= Waycross—Montgomery Line =

Railway line in Georgia and Alabama

Overview
- Other name(s): Thomasville Subdivision; Dothan Subdivision
- Status: Still operating under CSX
- Owner: Atlantic Coast Line Railroad (1902–1967); Seaboard Coast Line Railroad (1967–1986); CSX Transportation (1986-present)
- Locale: Georgia and Alabama

Technical
- Track gauge: 1,435 mm (4 ft 8 1/2 in) standard gauge
- Electrification: No
- Signalling: None

The Atlantic Coast Line Railroad's Waycross—Montgomery Line (N Line) was one of the company's secondary main lines running from Waycross, Georgia west to Montgomery, Alabama, a distance of over 300 miles. It was built in the late 1800s by the Atlantic Coast Line's predecessor companies. The line is still in service today and is now the Thomasville Subdivision and Dothan Subdivision of CSX Transportation, the Atlantic Coast Line's successor company through various mergers.

== Route description ==
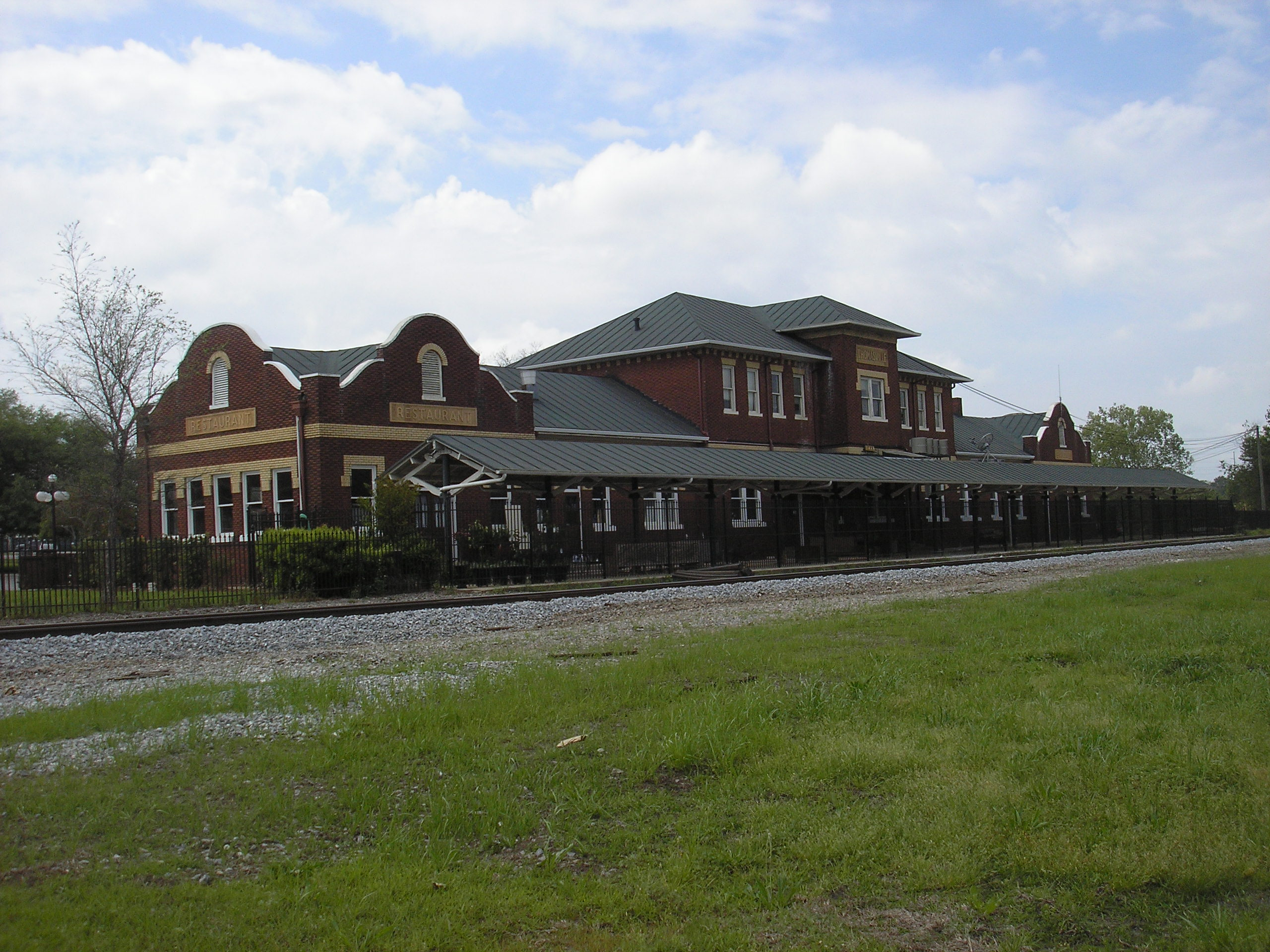
Atlantic Coast Line's Thomasville Depot

The Waycross—Montgomery Line began in Waycross, Georgia which was a significant junction and terminal for the Atlantic Coast Line. From Waycross, the line ran from Waycross southwest through rural southern Georgia to Valdosta and then west to Thomasville. Thomasville was also a major junction for the Atlantic Coast Line, with lines heading north to Albany and Fitzgerald and a line heading south to Florida which would later become part of their historic Perry Cutoff along Florida's west coast.

Beyond Thomasville, the Waycross—Montgomery Line continued west to Bainbridge, where it turned northwest and continued across the Chattahoochee River and into Alabama. In Alabama, it largely kept a northwest trajectory and passed through Dothan before reaching its terminus in Montgomery.

Since it spanned such a great distance, the segment from Waycross to Thomasville was within the company's Waycross District and the rest of the line west from Thomasville to Montgomery was within their Montgomery District.

=== Branches ===
The Waycross—Montgomery Line also had a few branch lines along its route. The Chattahoochee Branch ran from the line at Climax, Georgia southwest into Florida, where it terminated at River Junction in Chattahoochee.

The Abbeville Branch ran from the line at Grimes, Alabama north to Abbeville, Alabama.

The Elba Branch ran from the line at Waterford (just northeast of Newton) and ran largely west through Enterprise, and New Brockton to Elba.

The Luverne Branch ran from line at Sprague and ran south to Luverne, Alabama, a distance of 33.5 miles (53.9 km).

== History ==
=== 1859-1902: Formation under predecessors ===
The Waycross—Montgomery Line was built in two parts by two different railroads in the late 1880s. The line from Waycross to Bainbridge, Georgia was first built by the Atlantic and Gulf Railroad. It was completed from Waycross to Thomasville in 1859, shortly before the outbreak of the Civil War in 1861 which interrupted further construction. An extension west to Bainbridge was not completed until 1867. Henry B. Plant acquired the Atlantic and Gulf in November 1879 and reorganized the railroad as the Savannah, Florida and Western Railway (SF&W) the following month. Under Plant's direction, the SF&W then built the Chattahoochee Branch in 1882 from Climax southwest to the Florida state line. Plant then chartered the Chattahoochee and East Pass Railroad (which had been chartered 1881) to continue the branch to the Chattahoochee River at River Junction, a hamlet which later came to be known as Chattahoochee, Florida.

In 1887, the SF&W began building a 36-acre yard in Waycross.

In March 1887 the Alabama Midland Railway was chartered in Alabama and Georgia in October to construct a line connecting Montgomery and Bainbridge. The company was consolidated on October 28, 1888, and completed the entire 175 miles (282 km) between the two cities in 1890. Construction also included the Luverne Branch.

After the completion of the Alabama Midland Railway, it was acquired in July 1890 by Henry B. Plant of the Plant System and merged into the SF&W. Together the railroads formed a continuous mainline from Savannah to Montgomery, colloquially known as the "bow line" due to its distinctive shape.

=== 1902-1967: Atlantic Coast Line ownership ===
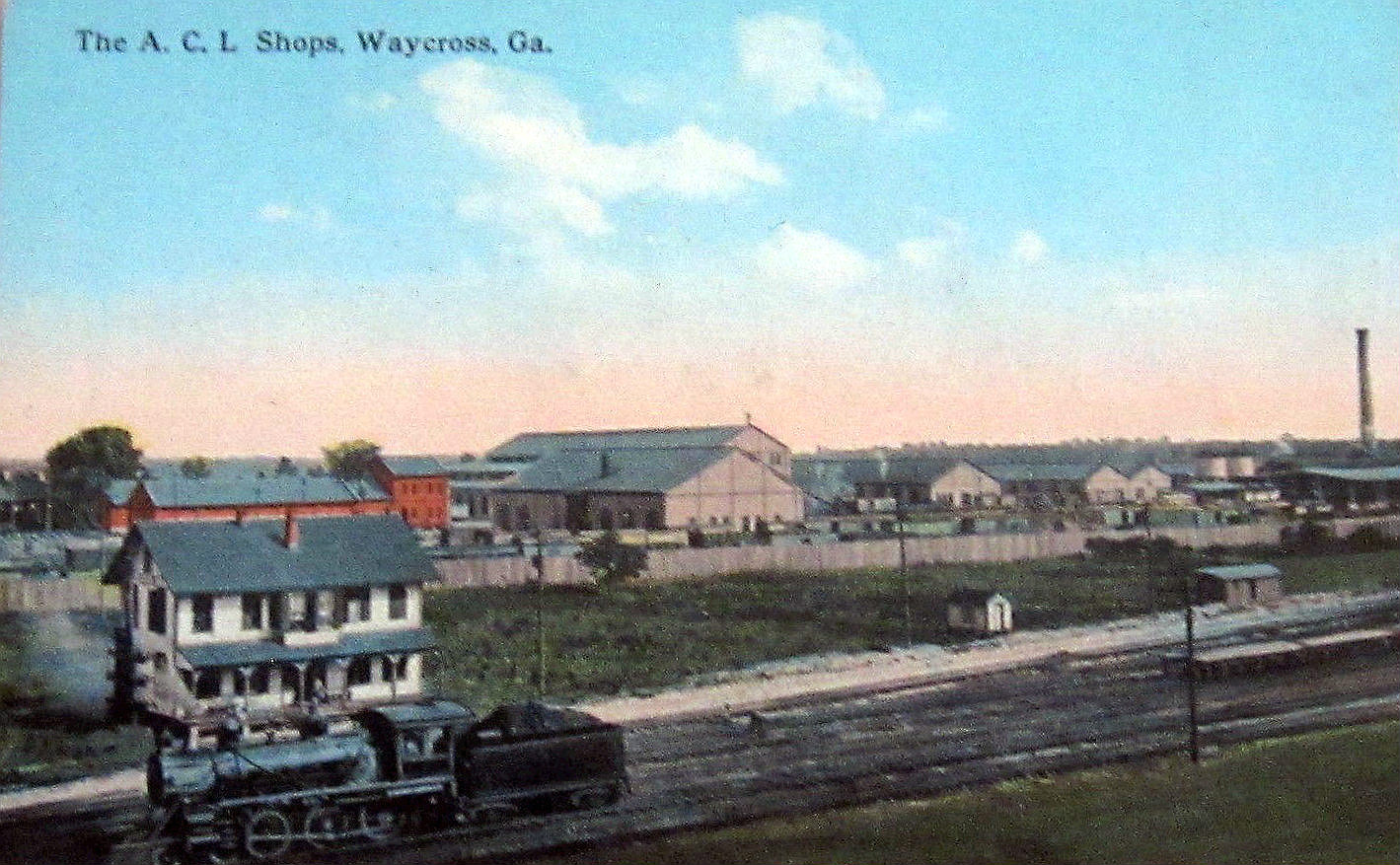
Postcard of the Atlantic Coast Line's Waycross yard and shops

The Atlantic Coast Line gained control of the Plant System on July 1, 1902. The Atlantic Coast Line designated the SF&W from Waycross to Montgomery as its own line with track east of Waycross being incorporated into other routes for the company. The Waycross—Montgomery Line would become a busy route for the Atlantic Coast Line. It became the route of the South Wind, which originated in Chicago and travelled to Montgomery via Louisville and Nashville Railroad, and then ran from Montgomery to Waycross and on to Florida.

By the end of 1949, two local passenger trains (which originated in Savannah, Georgia) were running the line in addition to the South Wind. At the same time, two local freight trains ran the full length of the line, with a third local freight train running six days a week. Three freight trains to Florida also ran the line from Waycross to DuPont, where they diverged on to the DuPont—Lakeland Line.

The Atlantic Coast Line abandoned the Luverne Branch in the 1950s.

=== Later years ===
The Atlantic Coast Line became the Seaboard Coast Line Railroad (SCL) in 1967 after merging with their rival, the Seaboard Air Line Railroad (SAL). At the time of the merger, the Seaboard Air Line operated a nearly parallel route from Savannah to Montgomery (the former Savannah, Americus and Montgomery Railway) that ran less than 100 miles to the north. Though that route was freight-only by the time of the merger.

The Seaboard Coast Line adopted the Seaboard Air Line's method of naming their lines as subdivisions. As a result, the Waycross—Thomasville Line was renamed by the company to the Thomasville Subdivision east of Thomasville, and the Dothan Subdivision west of there (as it is today). The branch to Chattahoochee became the Chattahoochee Subdivision.

The Seaboard Coast Line continued passenger service on the line including the South Wind until May of 1971, when the Seaboard Coast Line's passenger services were taken over by Amtrak. Amtrak continued to operate the South Wind until November 14, 1971, when Amtrak renamed the train the Floridian and reduced it to a two-night schedule. Passenger service was ended on the line when Amtrak discontinued the Floridian in 1979 as part of the Federal budget cuts that year that impacted several major Amtrak routes.

In 1978, Waycross Yard was renamed Rice Yard in honor of former Atlantic Coast Line Chairman Thomas Rice.

In 1980, the Seaboard Coast Line's parent company merged with the Chessie System, creating the CSX Corporation. The CSX Corporation initially operated the Chessie and Seaboard Systems separately until 1986, when they were merged into CSX Transportation.

The Chattahoochee Subdivision was abandoned in 1983.

== Current operations ==
The full line from Waycross to Montgomery is still in service today and is owned and operated by CSX Transportation. Freight CSX trains still run the full line from Waycross to Montgomery, including lengthy local road freight trains. The line is mostly dispatched by Track Warrant Control.

=== Thomasville Subdivision ===
The line from Waycross west to Thomasville is still operating as CSX's Thomasville Subdivision. CSX has made upgrades to the Thomasville Subdivision in recent years, including the installation continuous welded rail in the early 2020s.

The Thomasville Subdivision interchanges with the Georgia and Florida Railway in Valdosta, Quitman, and Thomasville. It also intersects Norfolk Southern Railway's Macon and Navair Districts in Valdosta.

=== Dothan Subdivision ===
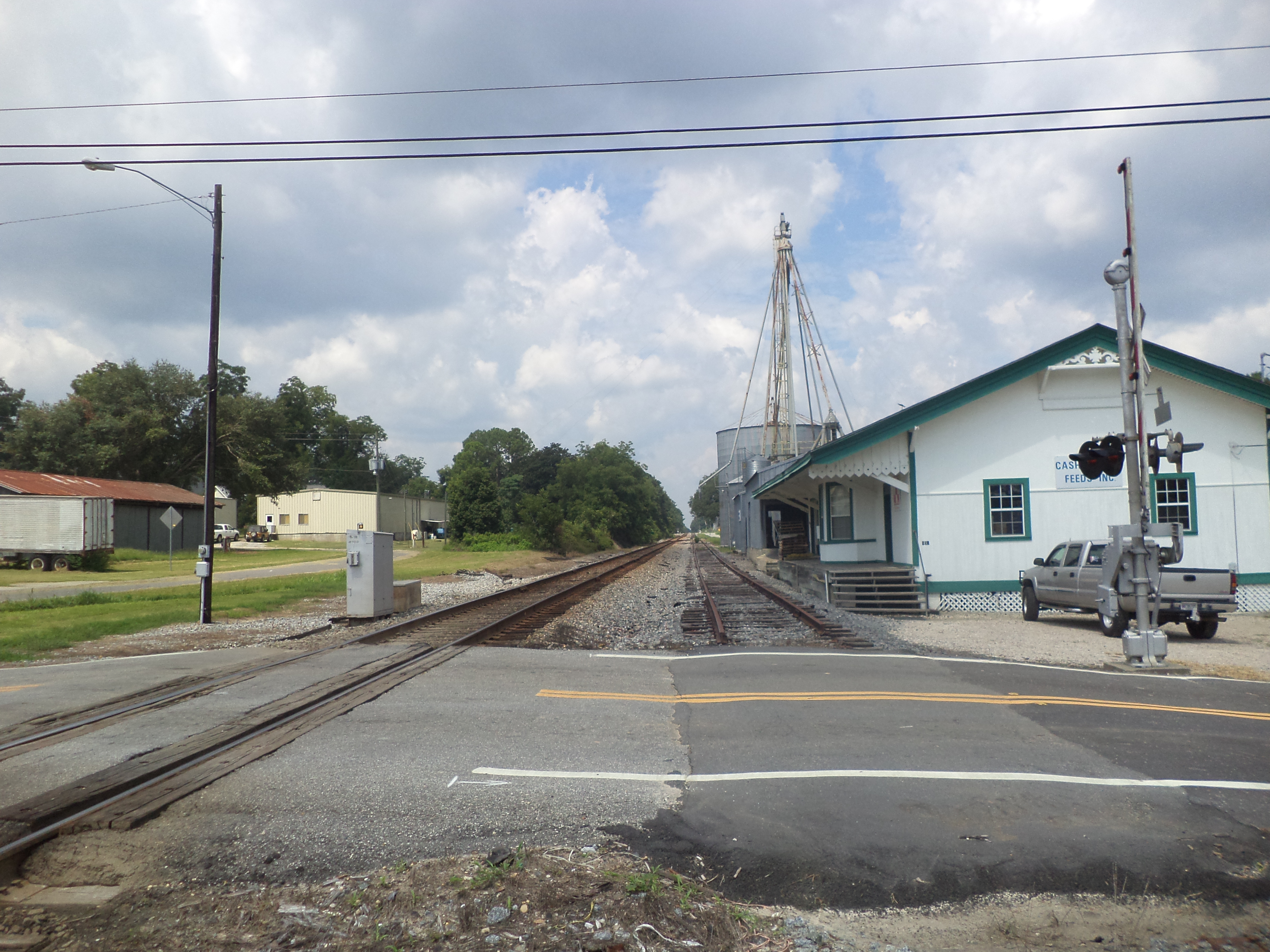
Dothan Subdivision passing in Whigham, Georgia

The line from Thomasville west to Montgomery is still operating as CSX's Dothan Subdivision.

Numerous unit trains originating or terminating on the Dothan Subdivision continue to operate, including loaded and empty unit grain to and from the feed mills located in Troy, Banks, Pinckard, and Enterprise (via Waterford). In addition to lengthy local road freight trains, occasional unit train shipments of rock and pipe continue to originate in Dothan.

A number of shortlines also interchange with CSX on the Dothan Subdivision, including the Conecuh Valley Railroad at Troy, the Wiregrass Central Railroad near Newton, the Bay Line Railroad at Grimes and Dothan, the Chattahoochee Industrial Railroad at Saffold, Georgia, and the Georgia Southwestern Railroad at Bainbridge. The Bay Line Railroad also has trackage rights from Dothan to Grimes to connect its two lines.

Perhaps the biggest boon to the Dothan Subdivision came in 2005 as Hyundai completed the construction of a new automotive assembly plant near Montgomery. This plant generates significant traffic for the line. The railroad also provides an important relief route for the frequently congested Manchester Subdivision, a purpose the line has also served for CSX's predecessors.

=== Rice Yard ===
Rice Yard in Waycross, Georgia is still in service and it has grown to over 850-acres. It is now the largest railroad yard in the southeast and the second largest yard in the CSX system. CSX's largest locomotive maintenance and inspection facility is located within the yard as well. Between 1,700 and 2,900 cars rail cars pass through Rice Yard for classification or inspection a day.

== Historic stations ==
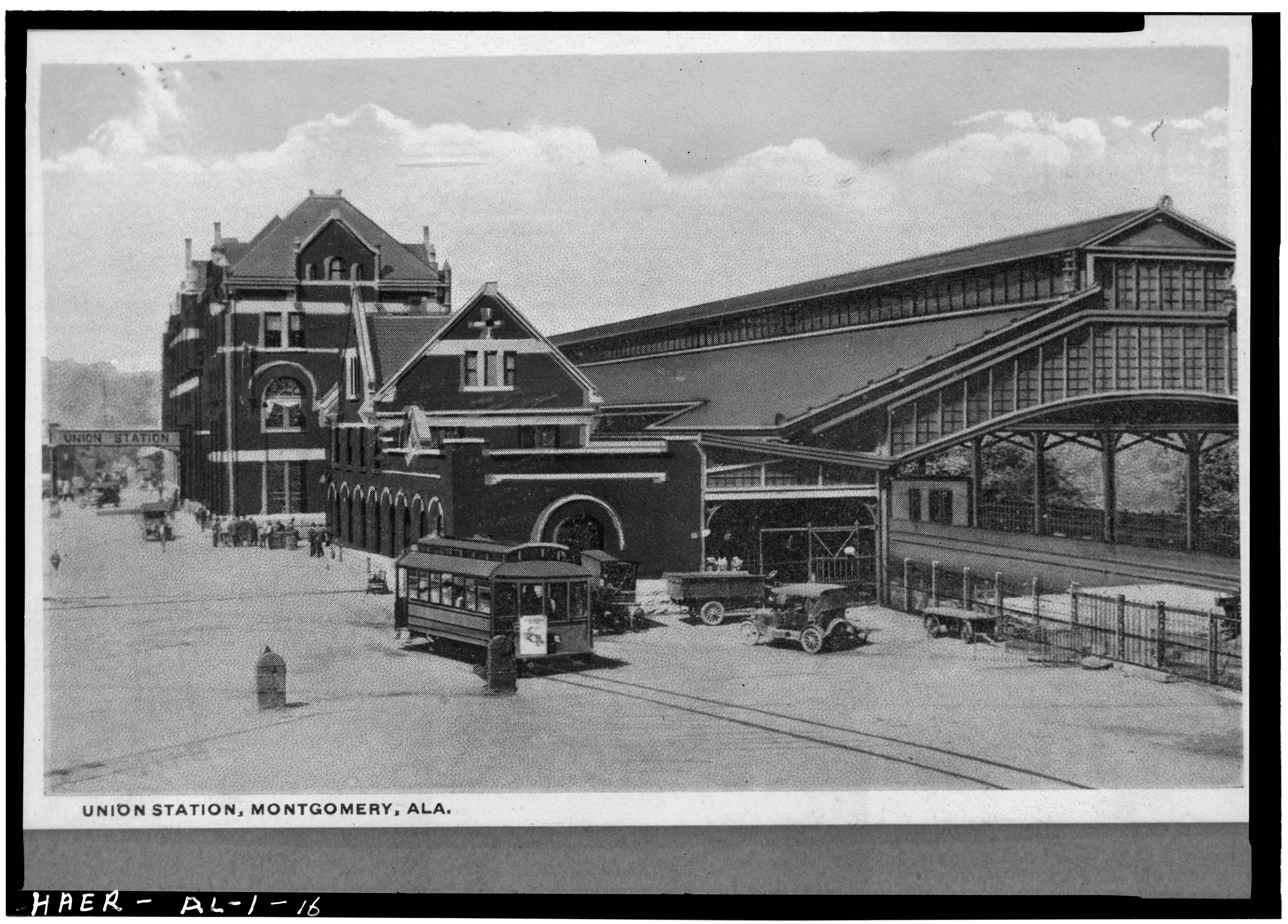
Montgomery Union Station

Waycross to Montgomery
State	Milepost	City/Location	Station	Connections and notes
GA	AN 587.8	Waycross	Waycross	originally Malvern junction with: Jesup—Folkston Line; Albany—Brunswick Line; Atlanta, Birmingham and Atlantic Railway (ACL)
GA	AN 590.0	Waycross	West Waycross	
GA	AN 594.2		Ruskin	
GA	AN 599.6		Glenmore	
GA	AN 601.5		Manor	
GA	AN 607.4		Argyle	
GA	AN 613.4		Homersville	
GA	AN 617.4		Cutting	
GA	AN 622.3	DuPont	DuPont	junction with DuPont—Lakeland Line originally Lawton
GA	AN 628.9		Stockton	
GA	AN 634.8		Naylor	junction with Lakeland Railway
GA	AN 640.8		Bandy	
GA	AN 649.8	Valdosta	Valdosta	junction with: Georgia and Florida Railroad (SOU); Georgia Southern and Florida Railway (SOU); Atlantic, Valdosta and Western Railway (GSF/SOU); Valdosta, Moultrie and Western Railroad
GA	AN 650.9	Valdosta	West Valdosta	
GA	AN 655.5		Kinderlou	
GA	AN 657.9		Ousley	
GA	AN 665.3	Quitman	Quitman	junction with South Georgia Railroad (SOU)
GA	AN 672.1		Dixie	originally Groover
GA	AN 674.6		Pidcock	original junction with Georgia Northern Railway (SOU)
GA	AN 679.3	Boston	Boston	junction with Georgia Northern Railway (SOU)
GA	AN 686.3		Newark	
GA	AN 691.5	Thomasville	Thomasville	rebuilt in 1914 junction with: Thomasville—Dunnellon Line; Albany—Thomasville Line; Tifton, Thomasville and Gulf Railway (AB&A/ACL); Florida Central Railroad (ACL)
GA	AN 698.9		Pine Park	
GA	AN 705.6		Cairo	junction with Pelham and Havana Railroad
GA	AN 712.6		Whigham	
GA	AN 719.0	Climax	Climax	junction with Chattahoochee Branch
GA	AN 728.9	Bainbridge	Bainbridge	junction with: Georgia Florida and Alabama Railway (SAL); Bainbridge Northern Railway
GA	AN 730.1	Bainbridge	West Bainbridge	
GA	AN 734.1		Hanover	
GA	AN 737.6	Brinson	Brinson	
GA	AN 744.0	Iron City	Iron City	
GA	AN 748.6	Donalsonville	Donalsonville	
GA	AN 754.7	Jakin	Jakin	
GA	AN 759.1		Saffold	
AL	AN 761.3		Alaga	
AL	AN 763.3	Gordon	Gordon	
AL	AN 769.0		Pansey	
AL	AN 772.5	Ashford	Ashford	
AL	AN 776.9	Cowarts	Cowarts	
AL	AN 783.3	Dothan	Dothan	junction with: Atlanta and St. Andrews Bay Railroad; Chattahoochee and Gulf Railroad (CofG/SOU)
AL	AN 789.0	Grimes	Grimes	junction with Abbeville Branch
AL	AN 792.6	Midland City	Midland City	
AL	AN 795.9	Pinckard	Pinckard	
AL	AN 800.5	Newton	Waterford	junction with Elba Branch
AL	AN 806.1		Ewell	
AL	AN 810.3	Ozark	Ozark	
AL	AN 816.2		Dillard	
AL	AN 822.2	Ariton	Ariton	
AL	AN 826.4		Tennille	
AL	AN 833.9	Brundidge	Brundidge	
AL	AN 840.3	Banks	Banks	
AL	AN 848.4		Corcoran	
AL	AN 851.1	Troy	Troy	
AL	AN 851.6	Troy	West Troy	
AL	AN 858.8		Youngblood	
AL	AN 865.5		Olustee	
AL	AN 871.1		Grady	
AL	AN 876.0		Ramer	
AL	AN 883.9		Sprague	junction with Luverne Branch
AL	AN 889.1		Tharin	
AL	AN 894.1		Snowdoun	
AL	AN 898.2		Wiley	
AL	AN 900.7	Montgomery	Day Street Yard	
AL	AN 902.2	Montgomery	Montgomery Union Station	junction with: Mobile and Montgomery Railroad (L&N); Seaboard Air Line Railroad Montgomery Subdivision; Central of Georgia Railway; Gulf, Mobile and Ohio Railroad

Chattahoochee Branch
State	Milepost	City/Location	Station	Connections and notes
GA	ANE 719.1	Climax	Climax	junction with Waycross—Montgomery Line
GA	ANE 721.1		Otisca	
GA	ANE 727.7		Fowlstown	junction with Georgia Florida and Alabama Railroad (SAL)
GA	ANE 734.4		Faceville	
GA	ANE 740.5		Recovery	
FL	ANE 749.4	Chattahoochee	River Junction	junction with: Louisville and Nashville Railroad P&A Division; Apalachicola Northern Railroad; Seaboard Air Line Railroad Tallahassee Subdivision

Luverne Branch
Milepost	City/Location	Station	Connections and notes
ANH 883.9		Sprague	junction with Waycross—Montgomery Line
ANH 892.5		Sellers	
ANH 899.3		Lapine	
ANH 904.1		Bradleyton	
ANH 908.3		Petrey	
ANH 913.2		Patsburg	
ANH 919.2	Luverne	Luverne	

== See also ==
- List of CSX Transportation lines
