= Southwestern Alabama Railway =

Overview
- Locale: Southern Alabama
- Dates of operation: 1897–1902
- Successor: Alabama Midland Railway; Plant System; Atlantic Coast Line Railroad; Seaboard Coast Line Railroad; CSX Transportation; Wiregrass Central Railroad

Technical
- Track gauge: 4 ft 8 1/2 in (1,435 mm) standard gauge

The Southwestern Alabama Railway (SWA) was incorporated in Alabama, United States, in 1897 and tasked with the construction of a branch line from a connection with the Alabama Midland Railway near Newton, Alabama towards Elba, Alabama. The route was completed to Elba in October 1898, totaled 37.2 miles (59.9 km), and was operated by the Alabama Midland Railway.

As surveyed the original route was to terminate at Elba, with a depot constructed in the city proper. However, as built the railroad instead ended approximately one mile south of the city limits, briefly creating conflict with businessmen and other sponsors of the new route who resided in Elba proper. Within a few years of the new railroad construction Elba's industrial district was located around the railroad wye south of town. Prior to the arrival of the SWA the region surrounding Elba and Enterprise had only hosted logging railroads.

The Southwestern Alabama Railway and the Alabama Midland Railway were acquired in July 1890 by Henry B. Plant of the Plant System and merged with his Savannah, Florida & Western Railway.

The Atlantic Coast Line Railroad gained control of the Plant System on July 1, 1902. The Atlantic Coast Line operated the line as their Elba Branch. Passenger train service was provided until August 16, 1954, when the Atlantic Coast Line cancelled mixed train operations over the branch. Instead, a local freight originated from Dothan as train 539 westbound, and returned eastbound as train 538 after making the trip to Elba. Train order offices were located at Daleville, Enterprise, and Elba during this period.

The Atlantic Coast Line maintained control of the line from 1902 until 1967 when it was merged with the Seaboard Air Line to form the Seaboard Coast Line Railroad (SCL). Under the Seaboard Coast Line, the line was designated as the Elba Subdivision and a local freight train continued to run the line every day except of Sundays. The local train numbers changed to 639 and 638 respectively. Employee timetables of the era scheduled departure of the local in the early morning from Dothan, exiting the main line at Waterford - a wye junction near Newton. The local train, known as the "Elba turn", ended its westbound trip at the large Dorsey Trailer facility in Elba, where an additional wye allowed the train to be turned for the return trip east towards Enterprise and eventually Dothan. This routine as established by timetable remained relatively unchanged through the creation of the Seaboard System. Dorsey trailers operated one of the largest trailer manufacturing facilities in the U.S. at Elba, and provided many piggyback trailers for the SCL among other railroads. Later, Utility Trailer opened a plant at Enterprise and constructed a piggyback ramp served by the railroad. Additional changes came in 1983 with the creation of the Seaboard System and in 1986 it became CSX Transportation.

The last train movement between Elba and Clintonville occurred in 1984 and tracks were abandoned shortly after. The remainder of the branch was then designated as the Enterprise Subdivision.

In 1980, the Seaboard Coast Line's parent company merged with the Chessie System, creating the CSX Corporation. The CSX Corporation initially operated the Chessie and Seaboard Systems separately until 1986, when they were merged into CSX Transportation. CSX briefly operated the line from its creation until December 1987, when it was sold to the current shortline operator, Wiregrass Central Railroad. On July 10, 1992, an additional segment running approximately 2 miles (3.2 km) from Clintonville to Enterprise was abandoned by the Wiregrass Central, prompted by the closure of a woodyard at the end of the line.

== Historic stations ==
| Milepost | City/Location | Station | Connections and notes |
|---|---|---|---|
| ANG 800.5 | Newton | Waterford | junction with Alabama Midland Railway |
| ANG 804.5 | | Kelly | |
| ANG 807.8 | Daleville | Daleville | |
| ANG 810.6 | | Gerald | |
| ANG 817.4 | Enterprise | Enterprise | |
| ANG 826.6 | New Brockton | New Brockton | |
| ANG 836.7 | Elba | Elba | |
