= Rocky Head, Alabama =

Unincorporated community in Alabama, United States

- Unincorporated community
- Location within Alabama Location within the United States
- Coordinates: 31°34′06″N 85°46′07″W
- Country: United States
- State: Alabama
- County: Dale
- Elevation: 472 ft (144 m)
- Time zone: UTC-6 (Central (CST))
  - Summer (DST): UTC-5 (CDT)
- Area code: 334
- GNIS feature ID: 153202

Rocky Head, also known as Rockyhead, is an unincorporated community in Dale County, Alabama, United States. Rocky Head is located on Alabama State Route 51, 3.6 miles (5.8 km) southwest of Ariton.

== History ==
Rocky Head was founded three miles south of where the community is today. The name of the community described the site of the original post office, which sat near the head of Claybank Creek. The community kept its original name after moving to its current site. A post office operated under the name Rocky Head from 1855 to 1904.

A portion of the 15th Regiment Alabama Infantry came from Rocky Head.
