= Echo, Alabama =

Unincorporated community in Alabama, United States

- Unincorporated community
- Location within Alabama Location within the United States
- Coordinates: 31°28′33″N 85°27′57″W
- Country: United States
- State: Alabama
- County: Dale
- Elevation: 453 ft (138 m)
- Time zone: UTC-6 (Central (CST))
  - Summer (DST): UTC-5 (CDT)
- Area code: 334
- GNIS feature ID: 117842

Echo, also known as Marshalls Cross Roads, is an unincorporated community in Dale County, Alabama, United States. Echo is located on Alabama State Route 27, 10.4 miles (16.7 km) east of Ozark.

== History ==
Traditional explanation holds the community was named when early settlers were constructing a log cabin and heard an echo as two logs hit each other. A post office operated under the name Echo from 1851 to 1904.

Company B (known as "The Dale County Grays") of the 33rd Regiment Alabama Infantry was partially made up of men from Echo. A portion of the 15th Regiment Alabama Infantry also came from Echo.

== Demographics ==
Echo was listed on the 1880 U.S. Census as an unincorporated community with a population of 123.

Historical population
Census	Pop.	Note	%±
1880	123		—
U.S. Decennial Census
