= Abbeville Southern Railway =

Overview
- Locale: Southern Alabama
- Dates of operation: 1893–1902
- Successor: Alabama Midland Railway; Plant System; Atlantic Coast Line Railroad; Seaboard Coast Line Railroad; CSX Transportation; Abbeville–Grimes Railway Company; Bay Line Railroad

Technical
- Track gauge: 4 ft 8 1/2 in (1,435 mm) standard gauge
- Length: 26.9 miles (43.3 km)

The Abbeville Southern Railway was incorporated in Alabama in September 1892 for the purpose of building a railroad line from Grimes, Alabama northeast to Abbeville, Alabama. The route was completed in December 1893, totaling 26.9 miles (43.3 km), and was operated by the Alabama Midland Railway.

== History ==
The Abbeville Southern Railway was created in September 1892 to build a branch line from the Alabama Midland Railway in Grimes, reaching Abbeville in December of the following year. Following the completion of construction, the line was transferred to the Alabama Midland Railway, which operated the line until it was merged with Henry B. Plant's Savannah, Florida and Western Railway on September 2, 1901.

In 1902, the Atlantic Coast Line Railroad acquired the Savannah, Florida and Western Railway along with the rest of the Plant System. The Atlantic Coast Line Railroad operated the line as their Abbeville Branch (NF Branch). The Atlantic Coast Line would operate mixed trains (consisting of both passengers and freight) on the branch for many years but was eventually downgraded to freight only. Trains would connect with other Atlantic Coast Line services on the Waycross—Montgomery Line in Grimes.

The Atlantic Coast Line maintained control of the line from 1902 until 1967 when it was merged with the Seaboard Air Line to form the Seaboard Coast Line Railroad (SCL). Under the Seaboard Coast Line, the branch was designated as the Grimes Subdivision (the name Abbeville Subdivision was already in use on one of the company's lines through Abbeville, South Carolina). Local freight service continued and was scheduled to originate and terminate at Grimes. The local was numbered 641 while traveling towards Abbeville, and 640 for the return trip to Grimes. This local worked after the daily Montgomery-bound morning local passed through the area with fresh carloads for the branch, and returned well before the return trip local out of Montgomery to Dothan arrived again to retrieve cars from train 640's earlier trip. On October 28, 1979, the scheduled 641 and 640 trains were removed from the Waycross Division timetable and instead the branch was operated independent of an established schedule. In the final years of the Seaboard Coast Line, the branch was operated as a local road switcher with permanently stationed locomotives on the line or with an as-needed local launched from Dothan to work the Stone Container Corp woodchip mill in Abbeville.

In 1980, the Seaboard Coast Line's parent company merged with the Chessie System, creating the CSX Corporation. The CSX Corporation initially operated the Chessie and Seaboard Systems separately until 1986, when they were merged into CSX Transportation. In the late 1980s CSX sought to abandon the line from Grimes to Abbeville. However, the Stone Container Corporation, operator of a woodchip mill near Abbeville and the parent company of the Bay Line Railroad, sought to purchase the branch and preserve service, which it did on March 1, 1989. The company created the Abbeville–Grimes Railway Company to operate the branch. Rail Services Inc. was responsible for operations of the Abbeville–Grimes Railway using locomotives and rolling stock was supplied by the Bay Line Railroad.

On January 1, 1994, the Bay Line was sold to Rail Management Corporation with the Abbeville–Grimes Railway included in the purchase. The name was shortened to the A&G Railroad and continued to operate with Bay Line locomotives.

The A&G was formally merged into the Bay Line Railroad on June 26, 1996, and ceased to exist as a separate entity. The Bay Line Railroad still operates the line today.

== Historic stations ==
Milepost	City/Location	Station	Connections and notes
ANF 789.0	Grimes	Grimes	junction with Alabama Midland Railway
ANF 795.8	Headland	Headland	
ANF 801.1	Newville	Newville	
ANF 807.7		Capps	also known as Choctawhatchee
ANF 815.8	Abbeville	Abbeville	
