= Barnes, Alabama =

Unincorporated community in Alabama, United States

- Unincorporated community
- Location within Alabama Location within the United States
- Coordinates: 31°32′34″N 85°40′28″W
- Country: United States
- State: Alabama
- County: Dale
- Elevation: 495 ft (151 m)
- Time zone: UTC-6 (Central (CST))
  - Summer (DST): UTC-5 (CDT)
- Area code: 334
- GNIS feature ID: 156026

Barnes, also known as Barnes Cross Roads or Burns, is an unincorporated community in Dale County, Alabama, United States. Barnes is located on Alabama State Route 123, 4.6 miles (7.4 km) south-southeast of Ariton.

== History ==
A post office operated under the name Barnes Cross Roads from 1844 to 1895.

Company B (known as "The Dale County Grays") of the 33rd Regiment Alabama Infantry was partially made up of men from Barnes. A portion of the 15th Regiment Alabama Infantry also came from Barnes.
