= Arguta, Alabama =

Unincorporated community in Alabama, United States

- Unincorporated community
- Location within Alabama Location within the United States
- Coordinates: 31°34′10″N 85°35′43″W
- Country: United States
- State: Alabama
- County: Dale
- Elevation: 453 ft (138 m)
- Time zone: UTC-6 (Central (CST))
  - Summer (DST): UTC-5 (CDT)
- Area code: 334
- GNIS feature ID: 156001

Arguta is an unincorporated community in Dale County, Alabama, United States.

== History ==
Arguta was named after Argura, North Carolina, an unincorporated community in Jackson County. A post office operated under the name Arguta from 1891 to 1906.

== Demographics ==
=== Arguta Precinct (1910-50) ===
Historical population
| Census | Pop. | Note | %± |
|---|---|---|---|
| 1910 | 619 | | — |
| 1920 | 566 | | −8.6% |
| 1930 | 510 | | −9.9% |
| 1940 | 391 | | −23.3% |
| 1950 | 259 | | −33.8% |
U.S. Decennial Census

Arguta has never reported separately as an unincorporated community on the U.S. Census. However, the 5th precinct of Dale County was named for the community from 1910-1950. In 1960, the precinct was merged as part of a larger reorganization of counties into the census division of Ozark.
