= Asbury, Dale County, Alabama =

Unincorporated community in Alabama, United States

Asbury, Alabama
- Unincorporated community
- Location within Alabama Location within the United States
- Coordinates: 31°30′43″N 85°32′43″W
- Country: United States
- State: Alabama
- County: Dale
- Elevation: 420 ft (130 m)
- Time zone: UTC-6 (Central (CST))
  - Summer (DST): UTC-5 (CDT)
- Area code: 334
- GNIS feature ID: 113239

Asbury is an unincorporated community in Dale County, Alabama, United States.

== History ==
A post office operated under the name Asbury from 1890 to 1904.

== Demographics ==
According to the returns from 1850-2010 for Alabama, it has never reported a population figure separately on the U.S. Census.
