= Nolan Williams (politician) =

American politician (1941–2022)

Roy Nolan Williams Jr. (August 15, 1941 – February 12, 2022) was an American politician.

Williams was born in Dale County, Alabama. He received his bachelor's degree from Troy University and his master's degree from University of West Alabama which was Livingston State College. He was a schoolteacher in Virginia and in Florida, and then in Dale County. He sat on the school board. He was a member of the Alabama House of Representatives from 1975 to 1995 and was a Democrat. He died on February 12, 2022, at the age of 80.
