= Bertha, Alabama =

Unincorporated community in Alabama, United States

- Unincorporated community
- Location within Alabama Location within the United States
- Coordinates: 31°32′29″N 85°25′41″W
- Country: United States
- State: Alabama
- County: Dale
- Elevation: 466 ft (142 m)
- Time zone: UTC-6 (Central (CST))
  - Summer (DST): UTC-5 (CDT)
- ZIP code: 36353 (South Bertha) and 36374 (North Bertha)
- Area code: 334
- GNIS feature ID: 113974

Bertha is an unincorporated community in Dale County, Alabama, United States.

== History ==
Bertha is likely named in honor of the daughter of the post office master Bertha, which operated from 1891 to 1904.

== Bertha Pig Roast ==
Bertha is also the site of an annual food, music, and entertainment festival known as the "Bertha Pig Roast." Held each March, the event began as a small cookout in 1996, but it has grown into a weekend-long extravaganza featuring the local food, music, art, and history of the Bertha community.
