= Gerald, Alabama =

Unincorporated community in Alabama, United States

- Location within Alabama Location within the United States
- Coordinates: 31°19′26″N 85°45′26″W
- Country: United States
- State: Alabama
- County: Dale
- Elevation: 180 ft (55 m)
- Time zone: UTC-6 (Central (CST))
  - Summer (DST): UTC-5 (CDT)
- Area code: 334
- GNIS feature ID: 156402

Gerald was an unincorporated community in Dale County until 1965, when the area was incorporated into the town limits of the newly formed Level Plains, Alabama, United States.

== History ==
A post office operated under the name Gerald from 1898 to 1901. Gerald was a train whistle-stop on the Alabama Midland Railway running from Newton to Enterprise.
