= Dale County, Alabama =

County in Alabama, United States

- County
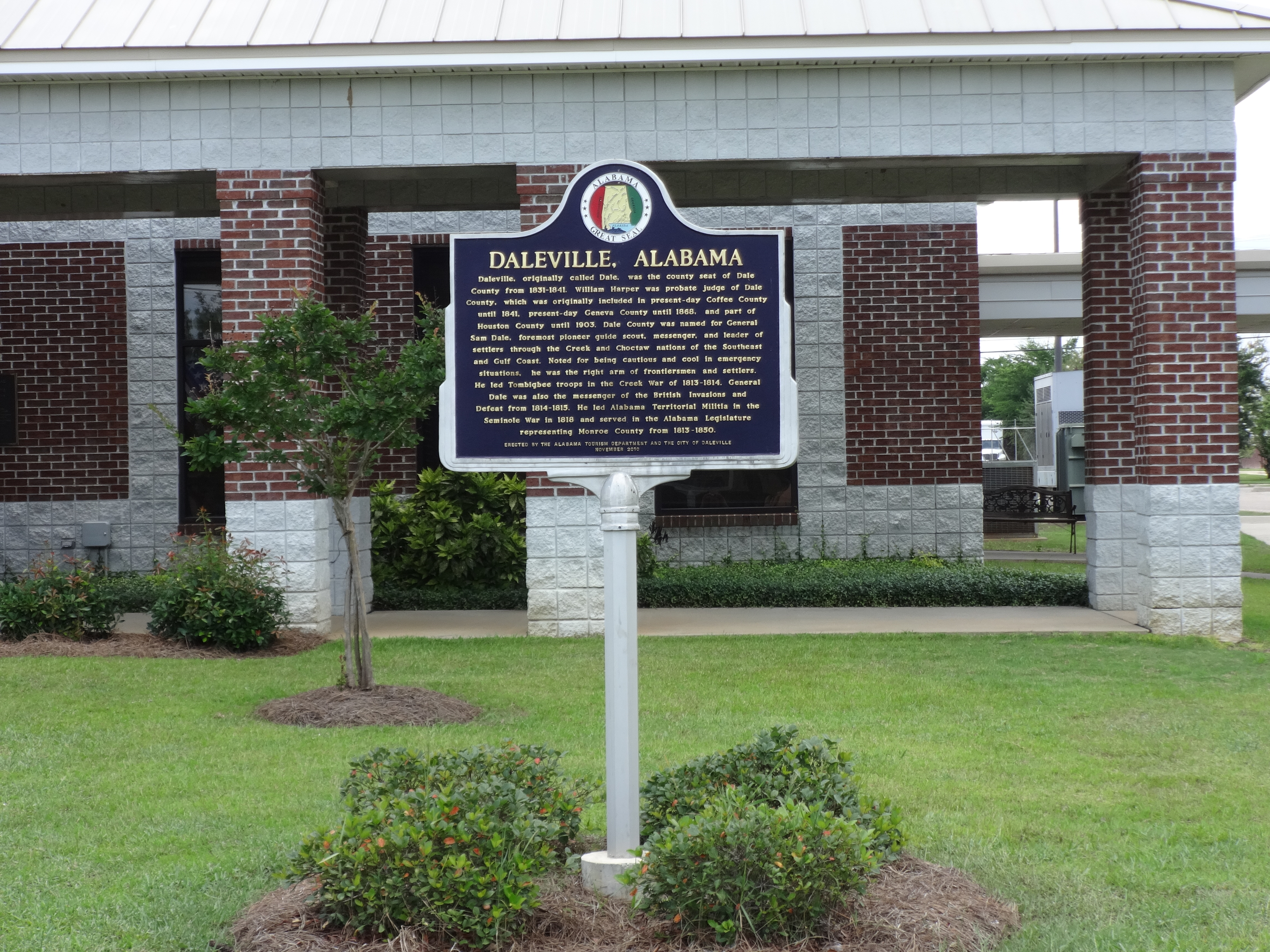
- Daleville historical marker

- Seal

- Location within the U.S. state of Alabama
- Coordinates: 31°26′00″N 85°36′00″W
- Country: United States
- State: Alabama
- Founded: December 22, 1824
- Named for: Samuel Dale
- Seat: Ozark
- Largest city: Ozark

Area
  - Total: 563 sq mi (1,460 km^{2})
  - Land: 561 sq mi (1,450 km^{2})
  - Water: 1.6 sq mi (4.1 km^{2}) 0.3%

Population (2020)
  - Total: 49,326
  - Estimate (2025): 49,912 ▲
  - Density: 87.9/sq mi (33.9/km^{2})
- Time zone: UTC−6 (Central)
  - Summer (DST): UTC−5 (CDT)
- Congressional district: 1st
- Website: dalecountyal.org
- County Number 26 on Alabama Licence Plates

Dale County is a county located in the southeastern part of the U.S. state of Alabama. As of the 2020 census, its population was 49,326. Its county seat and largest city is Ozark. Its name is in honor of General Samuel Dale.

Dale County comprises the Ozark, Alabama micropolitan statistical area, which is also included in the Dothan-Ozark combined statistical area. It was originally a part of Enterprise–Ozark micropolitan area before being split, and for a longer while was originally part of the Dothan-Enterprise-Ozark combined statistical area, but Coffee County is now its own separate primary statistical area in later censuses.

The vast majority of Fort Rucker is located in Dale County.

== History ==
The area now known as Dale County was originally inhabited by members of the Creek Indian nation, who occupied all of southeastern Alabama during this period. Between t 1764 and 1783, this region fell under the jurisdiction of the colony of British West Florida. The county, together with the surrounding area, was ceded to the United States in the 1814 Treaty of Fort Jackson, ending the Creek Indian Wars. A blockhouse had been constructed during the conflict on the northwestern side of the Choctawhatchee River, and the first non-Indian residents of Dale County were veterans who began to settle in the area around 1820.

Dale County was established on December 22, 1824. It originally included all of what is now Coffee County and Geneva County, together with the "panhandle" portion of Houston County. The original county seat was located at Dale's Court House (now the town of Daleville), but when Coffee County split from Dale in 1841, the seat was moved to Newton. Here it remained until 1870 when, following a courthouse fire in 1869 and the formation of Geneva County (which took the southern third of Dale County), the county seat was moved to the town of Ozark, where it remains. In 1903 a small portion of the southeast part of Dale county was joined to the newly formed Houston County.

Portions of the 15th Regiment of Alabama Infantry, which served with great distinction throughout the U.S. Civil War, were recruited in Dale County, with all of Co. "E" and part of Co. "H" being composed of Dale County residents. This unit is most famous for being the regiment that confronted the 20th Maine on the Little Round Top during the Battle of Gettysburg on July 2, 1863. Despite several ferocious assaults, the 15th was ultimately unable to dislodge the Union troops, and was ultimately forced to retreat after a desperate bayonet charge led by the 20th Maine's commander, Col. Joshua L. Chamberlain. This assault was vividly recreated in Ronald F. Maxwell's 1993 film Gettysburg. The 15th continued to serve until the final capitulation of Lee's army at Appomattox Court House in 1865.

Another regiment recruited largely from Dale County was the 33rd Alabama; Companies B, G and I were recruited in the county, with Co. G coming from Daleville; Co. B from Newton, Skipperville, Clopton, Echo, and Barnes Cross Roads; and Co. I from Newton, Haw Ridge, Rocky Head, Westville, and Ozark. This regiment fought with great distinction in the Army of Tennessee, mostly under famed General Patrick Cleburne, once winning the Thanks of the Confederate Congress for its action at Ringgold Gap. The regiment was largely annihilated during the battles of Perryville and Franklin, but a few men survived and returned to Dale County after the war.

== Geography ==
According to the United States Census Bureau, the county has a total area of 563 square miles (1,460 km^{2}), of which 1.6 square miles (4.1 km^{2}) (0.3%) are coverd by water. The county is located in the Wiregrass Region of southeast Alabama.

It is the fifth-smallest county in Alabama by land area and third-smallest by total area.

=== Major highways ===
- U.S. Highway 84 / State Route 12 (unsigned)
- U.S. Highway 231 / State Route 53 (unsigned)
- State Route 27
- State Route 37
- State Route 51
- State Route 85
- State Route 92
- State Route 123
- State Route 134
- State Route 248
- State Route 249
- State Route 605

=== Adjacent counties ===
- Pike County (northwest)
- Barbour County (north)
- Henry County (east)
- Houston County (southeast)
- Geneva County (southwest)
- Coffee County (west)

== Demographics ==
Historical population
| Census | Pop. | Note | %± |
|---|---|---|---|
| 1830 | 2,031 | | — |
| 1840 | 7,397 | | 264.2% |
| 1850 | 6,382 | | −13.7% |
| 1860 | 12,197 | | 91.1% |
| 1870 | 11,325 | | −7.1% |
| 1880 | 12,677 | | 11.9% |
| 1890 | 17,225 | | 35.9% |
| 1900 | 21,189 | | 23.0% |
| 1910 | 21,608 | | 2.0% |
| 1920 | 22,711 | | 5.1% |
| 1930 | 23,175 | | 2.0% |
| 1940 | 22,685 | | −2.1% |
| 1950 | 20,828 | | −8.2% |
| 1960 | 31,066 | | 49.2% |
| 1970 | 52,995 | | 70.6% |
| 1980 | 47,821 | | −9.8% |
| 1990 | 49,633 | | 3.8% |
| 2000 | 49,129 | | −1.0% |
| 2010 | 50,251 | | 2.3% |
| 2020 | 49,326 | | −1.8% |
| 2025 (est.) | 49,912 | ▲ | 1.2% |
U.S. Decennial Census; 1790–1960 1900–1990 2010–2020

=== Racial and ethnic composition ===
Dale County, Alabama – Racial and ethnic composition Note: the US Census treats Hispanic/Latino as an ethnic category. This table excludes Latinos from the racial categories and assigns them to a separate category. Hispanics/Latinos may be of any race.
| Race / Ethnicity (NH = Non-Hispanic) | Pop 2000 | Pop 2010 | Pop 2020 | % 2000 | % 2010 | % 2020 |
|---|---|---|---|---|---|---|
| White alone (NH) | 35,771 | 35,705 | 32,602 | 72.81% | 71.05% | 66.09% |
| Black or African American alone (NH) | 9,902 | 9,546 | 10,100 | 20.16% | 19.00% | 20.48% |
| Native American or Alaska Native alone (NH) | 285 | 337 | 217 | 0.58% | 0.67% | 0.44% |
| Asian alone (NH) | 518 | 527 | 648 | 1.05% | 1.05% | 1.31% |
| Pacific Islander alone (NH) | 67 | 42 | 42 | 0.14% | 0.08% | 0.09% |
| Other race alone (NH) | 65 | 66 | 164 | 0.13% | 0.13% | 0.33% |
| Multiracial (NH) | 879 | 1,207 | 2,299 | 1.79% | 2.40% | 4.66% |
| Hispanic or Latino (any race) | 1,642 | 2,821 | 3,254 | 3.34% | 5.61% | 6.60% |
| Total | 49,129 | 50,251 | 49,326 | 100.00% | 100.00% | 100.00% |

=== 2020 census ===
As of the 2020 census, the county had a population of 49,326. The median age was 38.5 years; 22.9% of the residents were under 18 and 17.3% were 65 years of age or older. The female/male ratio was 1:0.964 overall and 1:0.933 for those 18 and over.

The racial makeup of the county was 67.8% White, 20.8% Black or African American, 0.5% American Indian and Alaska Native, 1.4% Asian, 0.1% Native Hawaiian and Pacific Islander, 2.5% from some other race, and 6.9% from two or more races. Hispanic or Latino residents of any race comprised 6.6% of the population.

About 49.5% of residents lived in urban areas, while 50.5% lived in rural areas.

Of the 20,159 households in the county, 30.5% had children under 18 living with them, 29.4% had a female householder with no spouse or partner present, 29.9% o were made up of individuals, and 11.9% had someone living alone who was 65 or older.

The county had 22,761 housing units, of which 11.4% were vacant. Among occupied housing units, 59.6% were owner-occupied and 40.4% were renter-occupied. The homeowner vacancy rate was 2.2% and the rental vacancy rate was 8.7%.

=== 2010 census ===
As of the 2010 census, 50,251 people, 20,065 households, and 13,721 families were living in the county. The population density was 90 people per square mile (35 people/km^{2}). The 22,677 housing units had an average density of 40 units per square mile (15 units/km^{2}). The racial makeup of the county was 74.1% White, 19.3% African American, 0.7% Native American, 1.1% Asian, 0.1% Pacific Islander, 1.8% from other races, and 3.0% from two or more races; 5.6% of the population were Hispanic or Latino people of any race.

Of the 20,065 households, 30.1% had children under 18 living with them, 48.9% were married couples living together, 14.6% had a female householder with no husband present, and 31.6% were not families. About 27.3% of all households were made up of individuals, and 9.6% had someone living alone who was 65 or older. The average household size was 2.46, and the average family size was 2.98.

In the county, the age distribution was 24.8% under 18, 9.4% from 18 to 24, 26.7% from 25 to 44, 25.7% from 45 to 64, and 13.5% who were 65 or older. The median age was 36.1 years. For every 100 females, there were 97.6 males. For every 100 females 18 and over, there were 101.0 males.

The median income in the county for a household was $43,353 and for a family was $50,685. Males had a median income of $34,856 versus $24,569 for females. The per capita income for the county was $21,722. 14.8% of the population and 11.4% of families were below the poverty line, including 19.6% of those under 18 and 10.2% of those 65 and older.

=== 2000 census ===
As of the 2000 census, 49,129 people, 18,878 households, and 13,629 families lived in the county. The population density was 88 people per square mile (34 people/km^{2}). The 21,779 housing units had an average density of 39 units per square mile (15 units/km^{2}). The racial makeup of the county was 74.4% White, 20.4% Black or African American, 0.60% Native American, 1.1% Asian, 0.15% Pacific Islander, 1.3% from other races, and 2.2% from two or more races. Hispanics or Latinos of any race were 3.4% of the population; 2.85% of the population reported speaking Spanish at home, while 1.51% spoke German.

Of the 18,878 households, 36% had children under 18 living with them, 55% were married couples living together, 13.6% had a female householder with no husband present, and 27.8% were not families. About 24.3% of all households were made up of individuals, and 8.8% had someone living alone who was 65 or older. The average household size was 2.5, and the average family size was 3.0.

In the county, the age distribution was 26.6% under 18, 9.6% from 18 to 24, 30.3% from 25 to 44, 21.8% from 45 to 64, and 11.8% who were 65 or older. The median age was 34 years. For every 100 females, there were 98.3 males. For every 100 females 18 and over, there were 95 males.

The median income in the county for a household was $31,998 and for a family was $37,806. Males had a median income of $29,844 versus $19,988 for females. The per capita income for the county was $16,010. 15% of the population and 12.6% of families were below the poverty line, including 19.4% of those under 18 and 16.5% of those 65 and older.

== Government ==
Dale County is reliably Republican at the presidential level. The last Democrat to win the county in a presidential election is Jimmy Carter, who won it by a majority in 1976.

United States presidential election results for Dale County, Alabama
| Year | Republican | | Democratic | | Third party(ies) | |
| Year | No. | % | No. | % | No. | % |
|---|---|---|---|---|---|---|
| 1836 | 53 | 28.49% | 133 | 71.51% | 0 | 0.00% |
| 1840 | 367 | 35.32% | 672 | 64.68% | 0 | 0.00% |
| 1844 | 209 | 25.33% | 616 | 74.67% | 0 | 0.00% |
| 1848 | 368 | 39.87% | 555 | 60.13% | 0 | 0.00% |
| 1852 | 170 | 28.01% | 406 | 66.89% | 31 | 5.11% |
| 1856 | 0 | 0.00% | 945 | 69.28% | 419 | 30.72% |
| 1860 | 0 | 0.00% | 5 | 0.32% | 1,557 | 99.68% |
| 1868 | 346 | 22.31% | 1,205 | 77.69% | 0 | 0.00% |
| 1872 | 322 | 24.16% | 1,011 | 75.84% | 0 | 0.00% |
| 1876 | 269 | 19.05% | 1,143 | 80.95% | 0 | 0.00% |
| 1880 | 284 | 18.83% | 1,224 | 81.17% | 0 | 0.00% |
| 1884 | 145 | 12.12% | 980 | 81.94% | 71 | 5.94% |
| 1888 | 15 | 1.17% | 1,266 | 98.83% | 0 | 0.00% |
| 1892 | 15 | 0.58% | 1,460 | 56.48% | 1,110 | 42.94% |
| 1896 | 289 | 11.17% | 2,155 | 83.27% | 144 | 5.56% |
| 1900 | 888 | 39.86% | 1,141 | 51.21% | 199 | 8.93% |
| 1904 | 345 | 24.19% | 997 | 69.92% | 84 | 5.89% |
| 1908 | 346 | 26.15% | 921 | 69.61% | 56 | 4.23% |
| 1912 | 99 | 6.17% | 1,059 | 66.02% | 446 | 27.81% |
| 1916 | 597 | 31.93% | 1,260 | 67.38% | 13 | 0.70% |
| 1920 | 768 | 35.31% | 1,386 | 63.72% | 21 | 0.97% |
| 1924 | 297 | 20.61% | 1,117 | 77.52% | 27 | 1.87% |
| 1928 | 1,000 | 44.76% | 1,233 | 55.19% | 1 | 0.04% |
| 1932 | 155 | 6.31% | 2,300 | 93.65% | 1 | 0.04% |
| 1936 | 193 | 7.43% | 2,404 | 92.50% | 2 | 0.08% |
| 1940 | 374 | 12.80% | 2,543 | 87.03% | 5 | 0.17% |
| 1944 | 325 | 13.28% | 2,094 | 85.57% | 28 | 1.14% |
| 1948 | 230 | 14.36% | 0 | 0.00% | 1,372 | 85.64% |
| 1952 | 1,073 | 28.51% | 2,669 | 70.93% | 21 | 0.56% |
| 1956 | 1,284 | 34.59% | 2,318 | 62.45% | 110 | 2.96% |
| 1960 | 1,634 | 38.74% | 2,563 | 60.76% | 21 | 0.50% |
| 1964 | 4,970 | 83.77% | 0 | 0.00% | 963 | 16.23% |
| 1968 | 607 | 6.25% | 862 | 8.88% | 8,236 | 84.86% |
| 1972 | 8,346 | 83.14% | 1,594 | 15.88% | 98 | 0.98% |
| 1976 | 4,996 | 43.33% | 6,346 | 55.03% | 189 | 1.64% |
| 1980 | 7,247 | 57.64% | 4,936 | 39.26% | 390 | 3.10% |
| 1984 | 10,319 | 75.37% | 3,215 | 23.48% | 158 | 1.15% |
| 1988 | 9,266 | 71.80% | 3,476 | 26.94% | 163 | 1.26% |
| 1992 | 8,123 | 51.45% | 5,098 | 32.29% | 2,566 | 16.25% |
| 1996 | 8,288 | 57.84% | 4,732 | 33.02% | 1,310 | 9.14% |
| 2000 | 10,593 | 67.02% | 4,906 | 31.04% | 307 | 1.94% |
| 2004 | 13,621 | 74.71% | 4,484 | 24.60% | 126 | 0.69% |
| 2008 | 13,886 | 71.87% | 5,270 | 27.28% | 164 | 0.85% |
| 2012 | 13,108 | 70.47% | 5,286 | 28.42% | 207 | 1.11% |
| 2016 | 13,808 | 73.65% | 4,413 | 23.54% | 528 | 2.82% |
| 2020 | 14,303 | 72.46% | 5,170 | 26.19% | 265 | 1.34% |
| 2024 | 14,476 | 75.64% | 4,484 | 23.43% | 179 | 0.94% |

United States Senate election results for Dale County, Alabama2
| Year | Republican | | Democratic | | Third party(ies) | |
| Year | No. | % | No. | % | No. | % |
|---|---|---|---|---|---|---|
| 2020 | 13,653 | 69.51% | 5,955 | 30.32% | 33 | 0.17% |

United States Senate election results for Dale County, Alabama3
| Year | Republican | | Democratic | | Third party(ies) | |
| Year | No. | % | No. | % | No. | % |
|---|---|---|---|---|---|---|
| 2022 | 9,458 | 78.82% | 2,326 | 19.38% | 215 | 1.79% |

Alabama Gubernatorial election results for Dale County
| Year | Republican | | Democratic | | Third party(ies) | |
| Year | No. | % | No. | % | No. | % |
|---|---|---|---|---|---|---|
| 2022 | 9,363 | 77.99% | 2,222 | 18.51% | 421 | 3.51% |

== Education ==
Most areas are zoned to Dale County School District, but four municipalities have their own school districts: Daleville City School District, Dothan City Schools, Enterprise City Schools, and Ozark City Schools. Additionally, residents of Fort Rucker are assigned to schools operated by the Department of Defense Education Activity for elementary school. Students beyond the elementary level at Fort Rucker may attend local schools for secondary levels, with an on-post family choosing one of these options: Daleville City, Enterprise City, or Ozark City.

== Communities ==
=== Cities ===
- Daleville
- Dothan (partly in Houston County and Henry County)
- Enterprise (partly in Coffee County)
- Level Plains
- Ozark (county seat)

=== Towns ===
- Ariton
- Clayhatchee
- Grimes
- Midland City
- Napier Field
- Newton
- Pinckard

=== Census-designated place ===
- Fort Rucker (U.S. Army base)

=== Unincorporated communities ===
- Arguta
- Asbury
- Barnes
- Bertha
- Clopton
- Dillard
- Echo
- Ewell
- Gerald
- Kelly
- Mabson
- Rocky Head
- Skipperville
- Sylvan Grove

== Notable people ==
- Nolan Williams (1941–2022), Alabama state representative.

== See also ==
- National Register of Historic Places listings in Dale County, Alabama
- Properties on the Alabama Register of Landmarks and Heritage in Dale County, Alabama
