= Alabama Midland Railway =

Railway in Alabama and Georgia

Overview
- Locale: Southeast Alabama, Southwest Georgia
- Dates of operation: 1887–1890
- Successor: Plant System

Technical
- Track gauge: 4 ft 8 1/2 in (1,435 mm) standard gauge

The Alabama Midland Railway was incorporated in Alabama and Georgia in 1887, and built a line from Bainbridge, Georgia, to a point near Montgomery, Alabama. The route was completed in 1890. It became part of the Plant System in 1894, and in 1901 it was merged into the Savannah, Florida and Western Railway.

== History ==
On July 2, 1880, the Montgomery and Southern Railway was created to construct a new railroad linking Montgomery to the Florida coast. The company completed around 30 miles (48 km) of narrow gauge track by September 18, 1882. The company was reorganized as the Montgomery and Florida Railway in May 1886, and reorganized a second time as the Northwest and Florida Railroad in 1888. In November 1888, the railroad reached Luverne, Alabama. Now totaling 51 miles (82 km) the line was converted to standard gauge by July 1889. The Alabama Terminal and Improvement Company, a subsidiary of the Alabama Midland Railway, controlled the railroad by 1889 and incorporated the line from Montgomery to Luverne into its own network.

In March 1887, the Alabama Midland Railway was chartered in Alabama, and chartered in Georgia in October of the same year as the Alabama Terminal and Improvement Company. The companies were created with the purpose of constructing a line connecting Montgomery and Bainbridge. The company was consolidated on October 28, 1888, and completed the entire 175 miles (282 km) between the two cities in 1890, including a branch from Sprague to Luverne, Alabama, built by the Northwest & Florida Railroad, a distance of 33.5 miles (53.9 km).

Two subsidiary railroads of the Alabama Midland were tasked with constructing branchlines, the Southwestern Alabama Railway and the Abbeville Southern Railway. The former reached Elba in 1898 and the latter connected Abbeville to Grimes, Alabama, by 1901.

After the completion of the Alabama Midland railroad it was acquired in July 1890 by Henry B. Plant of the Plant System and merged with the Savannah, Florida & Western. Together the railroads formed a continuous mainline from Savannah to Montgomery, colloquially known as the "bow line" due to its distinctive shape.

The Atlantic Coast Line gained control of the Plant System on July 1, 1902 with the line becoming part of their Waycross—Montgomery Line. Ownership would remain with the ACL until its 1967 merger with Seaboard Air Line to form the Seaboard Coast Line and the mergers into the Seaboard System and CSX Transportation in 1983 and 1986 respectively. With the exception of the abandoned Luverne branch, all of the former Alabama Midland remains active today as part of the Dothan Subdivision of CSX Transportation and as part of two shortlines operating former branches, the Wiregrass Central on the remaining Elba branch, and the Bay Line over the Abbeville branch.
