= Ewell, Alabama =

Unincorporated community in Alabama, United States

- Unincorporated community
- Location within Alabama Location within the United States
- Coordinates: 31°25′18″N 85°34′29″W
- Country: United States
- State: Alabama
- County: Dale
- Elevation: 400 ft (120 m)
- Time zone: UTC-6 (Central (CST))
  - Summer (DST): UTC-5 (CDT)
- Area code: 334
- GNIS feature ID: 151764

Ewell is an unincorporated community in Dale County, Alabama, United States. Ewell is located on Alabama State Route 27, 3.0 miles (4.8 km) southeast of Ozark.

== History ==
Ewell is named in honor of the son of the community's first postmaster. A post office operated under the name Ewell from 1891 to 1905.
