= Kelly, Alabama =

Unincorporated community in Alabama, United States

- Unincorporated community
- Location within Alabama Location within the United States
- Coordinates: 31°19′26″N 85°39′19″W
- Country: United States
- State: Alabama
- County: Dale
- Elevation: 164 ft (50 m)
- Time zone: UTC-6 (Central (CST))
  - Summer (DST): UTC-5 (CDT)
- Area code: 334
- GNIS feature ID: 156547

Kelly, also known as Douglas or Douglas Kelly Station, is an unincorporated community in Dale County, Alabama, United States.

== Demographics ==
Kelly was listed in the 1970 U.S. Census as an incorporated community, but disincorporated before 1980.

Historical population
Census	Pop.	Note	%±
1970	325		—
U.S. Decennial Census

== History ==
A post office operated under the name Douglas from 1899 to 1923.

The T. L. Rosser Brick Company operated a brickworks in Kelly in the early 1900s.
