= Napier Field, Alabama =

- Town
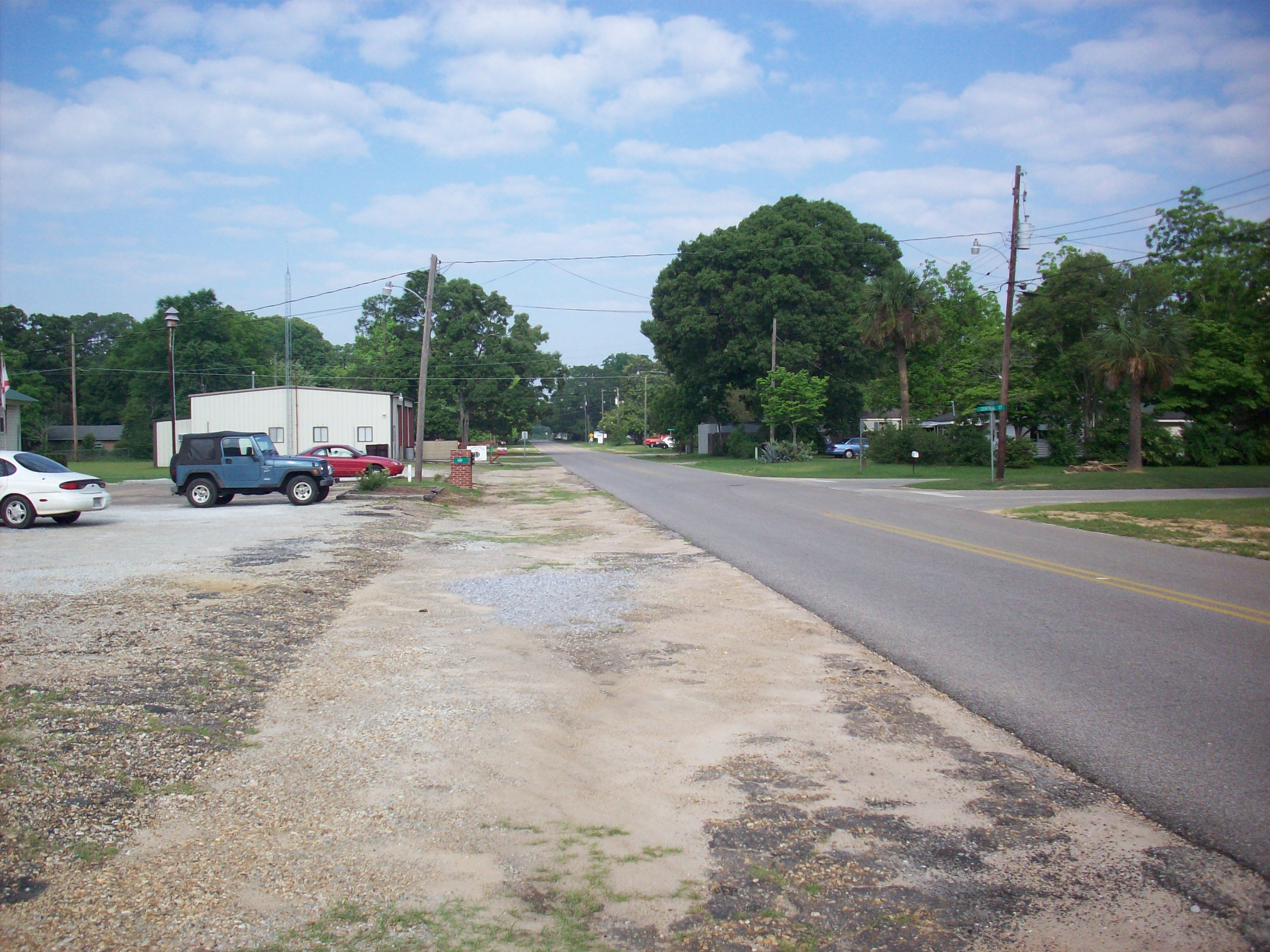
- A Road in Napier Field

- Flag

- Location of Napier Field in Dale County, Alabama.
- Coordinates: 31°18′54″N 85°27′18″W
- Country: United States
- State: Alabama
- County: Dale

Area
  - Total: 0.25 sq mi (0.66 km^{2})
  - Land: 0.25 sq mi (0.66 km^{2})
  - Water: 0 sq mi (0.00 km^{2})
- Elevation: 374 ft (114 m)

Population (2020)
  - Total: 409
  - Density: 1,599.0/sq mi (617.36/km^{2})
- Time zone: UTC-6 (Central (CST))
  - Summer (DST): UTC-5 (CDT)
- FIPS code: 01-53256
- GNIS feature ID: 2406224
- Website: http://www.napierfield.com

Napier Field is a town in Dale County, Alabama. At the 2020 census, the population was 409. It is part of the Ozark micropolitan statistical area. The town was originally constructed as a military air base during the Second World War. It is currently adjacent to Dothan Regional Airport. While the airport itself lies within Dothan's city limits, the adjacent housing units and other buildings constitute the incorporated town of Napier Field.

== Geography ==
According to the U.S. Census Bureau, the town has a total area of 0.3 square miles (0.78 km^{2}), all land.

== Demographics ==
Historical population
Census	Pop.	Note	%±
1970	572		—
1980	493		−13.8%
1990	462		−6.3%
2000	404		−12.6%
2010	354		−12.4%
2020	409		15.5%
U.S. Decennial Census; 2013 Estimate

As of the census of 2000, there were 404 people, 183 households, and 109 families residing in the town. The population density was 1,520.7 inhabitants per square mile (587.1/km^{2}). There were 234 housing units at an average density of 880.8 per square mile (340.1/km^{2}). The racial makeup of the town was 85.40% White, 11.39% Black or African American, 0.25% Native American, 0.74% from other races, and 2.23% from two or more races. 2.72% of the population were Hispanic or Latino of any race.

There were 183 households, out of which 24.0% had children under the age of 18 living with them, 44.3% were married couples living together, 9.8% had a female householder with no husband present, and 39.9% were non-families. 32.8% of all households were made up of individuals, and 13.7% had someone living alone who was 65 years of age or older. The average household size was 2.21 and the average family size was 2.85.

In the town, the population was spread out, with 21.0% under the age of 18, 9.9% from 18 to 24, 28.5% from 25 to 44, 24.3% from 45 to 64, and 16.3% who were 65 years of age or older. The median age was 39 years. For every 100 females, there were 99.0 males. For every 100 females age 18 and over, there were 92.2 males.

The median income for a household in the town was $27,868, and the median income for a family was $45,179. Males had a median income of $29,375 versus $19,583 for females. The per capita income for the town was $18,769. About 6.2% of families and 11.8% of the population were below the poverty line, including 18.4% of those under age 18 and 12.3% of those age 65 or over.
