= Wiregrass Central Railroad =

Railroad in Alabama, USA

Overview
- Headquarters: Enterprise, Alabama
- Reporting mark: WGCR
- Locale: Southeast Alabama
- Dates of operation: 1987–
- Predecessor: CSX Transportation

Technical
- Track gauge: 1,435 mm (4 ft 8 1/2 in) (standard gauge)
- Length: 19.5 miles (31.4 km)

The Wiregrass Central Railroad (reporting mark WGCR) is a shortline railroad operating 19.5 miles (31.4 km) of track from a CSX Transportation connection at Waterford, near Newton, to Enterprise, Alabama via the south side of Fort Novosel. The company was initially a subsidiary of Gulf and Ohio Railways and began operations in 1987 following the purchase of the Enterprise Subdivision branch line of CSX Transportation.

Industrial customers include Pilgrim's Pride, Wayne Farms, and the Sessions Company. Primary commodities include peanuts, peanut oil, corn, soy, and grass seed, generating approximately 8,200 annual carloads in 2008.

In April 2011, the Wiregrass Central was named as one of the three railroads being acquired by RailAmerica from Gulf and Ohio for $12.7 million following employee votes to unionize. In 2012, RailAmerica was acquired by Genesee & Wyoming, which is the current operator of the railroad.

== History ==
The Southwestern Alabama Railway was a Plant System subsidiary and completed its line in 1898, connecting Elba to the Alabama Midland Railway; both companies were later absorbed by the Atlantic Coast Line. Prior to the arrival of the SWA the region surrounding Elba and Enterprise had only hosted logging railroads. The Atlantic Coast Line maintained control of the line from 1902 until 1967 when it was merged with the Seaboard Coast Line. Additional changes came in 1983 with the creation of the Seaboard System and in 1986 it became CSX Transportation.

The Seaboard System formally filed to cut the line back 16.1 miles (25.9 km) to Clintonville on August 13, 1984 and designated the remaining 22.3 miles (35.9 km) as an industrial spur, protected by a derail at the entrance near Newton. The remaining portion of the line was sold by CSX to Gulf & Ohio subsidiary Wiregrass Central on December 11, 1987. The railroad was initially operated by L.A. Transportation and traffic included pulpwood, aggregates, and grain. On July 10, 1992, an additional segment running approximately 2 miles (3.2 km) from Clintonville to Enterprise was abandoned by the Wiregrass Central, prompted by the closure of a woodyard at the end of the line. Shortly after the Genesee & Wyoming acquisition of the line, another short portion of the extreme west of the railroad was administratively abandoned, as rails had been removed to repair other spots on the line years prior.

From 1987 until 2011, ownership was maintained by parent company Gulf & Ohio. Although sister operations in the Gulf & Ohio group came and went frequently throughout the 1990s and early 2000s, the Wiregrass Central remain unchanged. However, in 2011, along with fellow Gulf & Ohio subsidiaries Conecuh Valley Railroad and Three Notch Railroad, RailAmerica took ownership and responsibility of the Wiregrass Central. The following year, the large, rapidly expanding Genesse & Wyoming group acquired RailAmerica, placing the Wiregrass Central under new corporate ownership. As of early 2015, G&W continues to operate the shortline.

== Operations ==
Passenger train service was provided until August 16, 1954, when the Atlantic Coast Line cancelled mixed train operations over the branch. Instead, a local freight originated from Dothan as train 539 westbound, and returned eastbound as train 538 after making the trip to Elba. Train order offices were located at Daleville, Enterprise, and Elba during this period.

Under the Seaboard Coast Line the railroad was operated in a similar fashion to the ACL, with a local freight daily, with the exception of Sundays. Under the SCL, the local train numbers changed to 639 and 638 respectively. Employee timetables of the era scheduled departure of the local in the early morning from Dothan, exiting the mainline at Waterford - a wye junction near Newton - beginning its journey on the designated Elba subdivision of the Waycross division. The local train, or "turn" as it was commonly referred to on account of the train being turned (either via wye or runaround track) at the end of the line. The "Elba turn" ended its westbound trip at the large Dorsey Trailer facility at the namesake city, Elba, where an additional wye allowed the train to be turned for the return trip east towards Enterprise and eventually Dothan. This routine as established by timetable remained relatively unchanged through the creation of the Seaboard System. Dorsey trailers operated one of the largest trailer manufacturing facilities in the U.S. at Elba, and provided many piggyback trailers for the SCL among other railroads. Later, Utility Trailer opened a plant at Enterprise and constructed a piggyback ramp served by the railroad.

Shortly following creation of the Seaboard System railroad from the Family Lines conglomerate, the tracks between Elba and Clintonville were abandoned. The last train movement over this portion of the branch line occurred in 1984. By 1985, the abandoned portion was removed from SBD timetables. As a result of this abandonment and corporate reorganization, the subdivision was placed under the Jacksonville division in 1985, with the remainder of the branch being designated the Enterprise subdivision as Elba was no longer served by the railroad. Under the Seaboard System, the northbound local was numbered 742, with the return trip to Dothan via Waterford numbered 743. The Seaboard System designated the branch as an industrial spur, protected by a derail at Waterford. This exempted the local train operating the line from timetable and train order authority while on the branch and allowed free movement to work various industries along the subdivision. A local road switch engine was maintained at Enterprise through much of the 1980s in order to service local industries within the city limits and to lighten the workload for the daily local turn that operated over the branch.

CSX Transportation briefly operated the line from its creation in July, 1986 until December 1987, when it was sold to the current shortline operator, Wiregrass Central railroad. Under CSX, the Enterprise Subdivision was placed under the Mobile Division, and scheduled trains based on timetable and train order authority were replaced by direct traffic control systems. CSX maintained the tradition of predecessor railroads by launching a daily local train from Dothan to work the branch then return the same day. With the relinquishment of the line from CSX control, interchange service was instead made at Waterford, with the local road freight picking up or setting out cars for the shortline to retrieve. This practice continued unchanged through 2016.

Current rail customers served by the Wiregrass Central remain relatively unchanged from the initial startup of the operation in 1987. However, during the first five years of existence, the railroad served an aggregates consumer closer to Daleville, carried pulpwood from a woodyard near Clintonville (west of Enterprise), as well as additional peanut mills in Enterprise proper. With the decline in popularity of smaller volume railcar shipments during the 1990s, in addition to trucks being favored as a more flexible alternative to pulpwood shipment via railcar, these on line customers soon ceased rail shipments. This left only the current pair of feed mills and single peanut processor as the remaining source of daily traffic by 1996.

The Wiregrass Central supports unit corn trains destined for the Wayne Farms mill at Enterprise. As of early 2016, unit corn trains arrive weekly during the off season, with corn being purchased locally during harvest periods, negating the need for unit train deliveries during that time. Under the terms of the standard Grain Express unit train contract, six-axle CSX run through power traverses the branch to Enterprise in order to deliver the train to the feed mill and is promptly unloaded for the return trip. Corn and soybean products are blended at the mills to produce animal feed, and this combined rail traffic provides the bulk of the volume the Wiregrass Central moves on an annual basis. In addition to feed mill operations, peanut products originate from the Sessions mill on the west side of town, which is served daily by the railroad. Other traffic sources include temporary railcar storage and occasional transloading operations near the physical end of the property.

== Motive Power ==
Historically the shortline was operated by an assortment of EMD GP9, GP38 or GP40 locomotives. Other models, such as GP7s and a GP8 were also present during the course of Gulf & Ohio ownership. Originally, the Wiregrass Central maintained a bright red paint scheme with large white identifying numbers on the long hoods of their units. As the parent G&O group rapidly expanded its locomotive fleet in the early to mid 1990s, it became uneconomical to repaint all new additions red, thus a flat black scheme was instead created while maintaining the large white long hood numbers. As the year 2000 neared, GP38 model locomotives became favored for day-to-day operations of the railroad, with the remaining older locomotives placed in storage or scrapped at Enterprise.

Following acquisition of the line by Genesse & Wyoming in 2012, a pair of Larry's Truck Electric (LTEX) GP15-1 locomotives were used for day-to-day operations, while CSX locomotives, typically a trio of six axle power, bring unit corn trains to and from the feed mill located in Enterprise. Currently, motive power is provided by a pair of Genesse & Wyoming corporate SW1500 locomotives.

== Rolling Stock ==
Under previous ownership, the Wiregrass Central utilized corporate Gulf & Ohio covered hopper cars carrying sister railroad reporting marks of AGLF or MSDR, and later LXOH, the reporting marks of another G&O operation in Kentucky. The Genesee & Wyoming acquisition of the short line included the fleet of covered hoppers, which converted the cars to carry the namesake reporting marks of WGCR. These cars are primarily utilized by the Sessions Peanut Company, with additional cars held in reserve near the end of the Wiregrass Central's property in Enterprise.

| Model | Road number |
|---|---|
| EMD GP7 | 110 |
| EMD GP7 | 121 |
| EMD GP7 | 201 |
| EMD GP38 | 2023 |
| EMD GP38 | 2876 |
| EMD GP38 | 2882 |
| EMD GP38 | 2883 |
| EMD GP40 | 3023 |
| EMD GP40 | 6528 |
| EMD GP40 | 9702 |
| EMD GP40 | 9707 |
| EMD GP9 | 3832 |
| EMD GP9 | 6084 |
| EMD GP9 | 6226 |

== Links ==
- Wiregrass Central Railroad official webpage - Genesee and Wyoming website
- HawkinsRails.net - Wiregrass Central Railroad
