= Pinckard, Alabama =

- Town
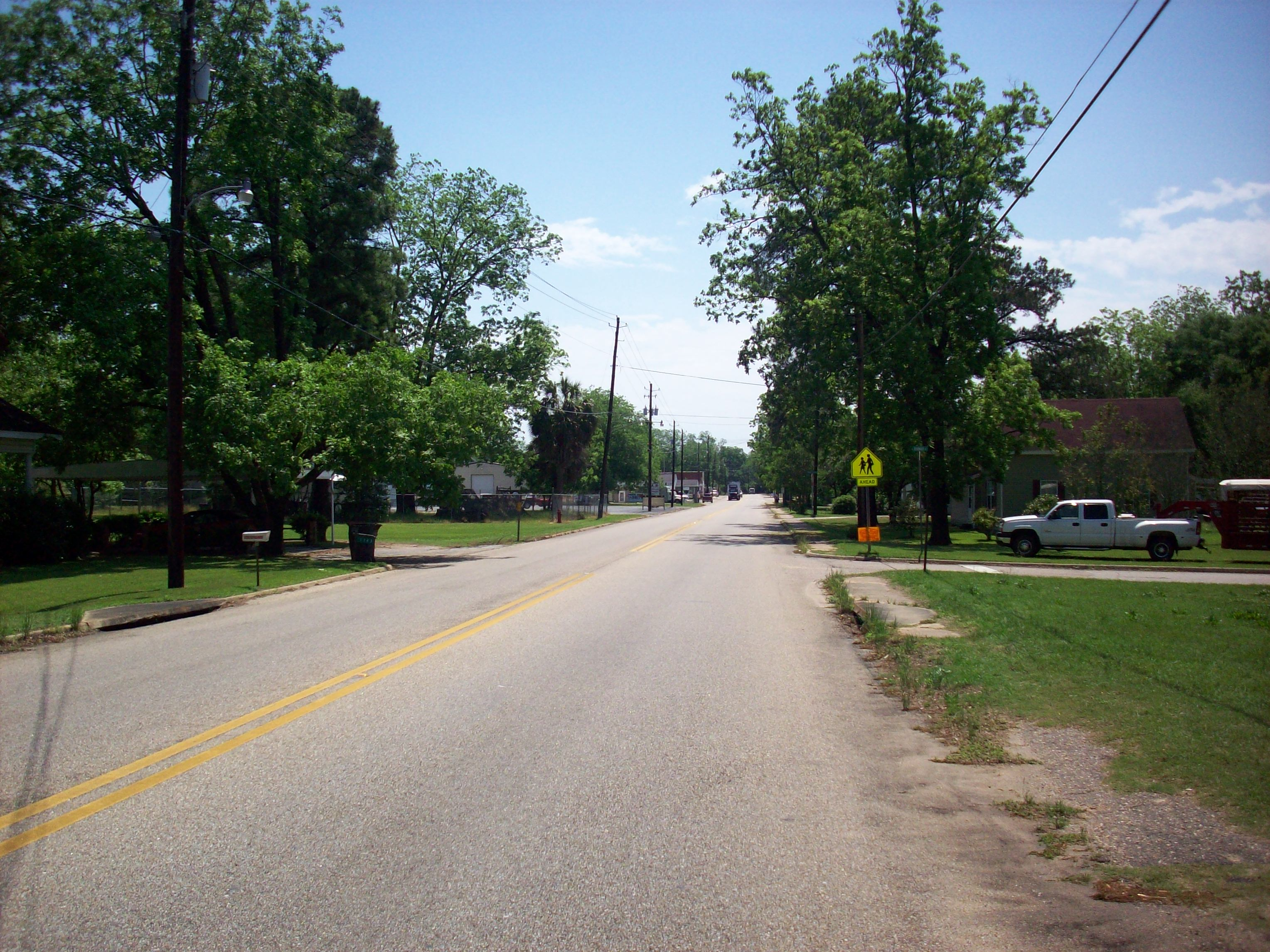
- Main Street in Pinckard

- Location of Pinckard in Dale County, Alabama.
- Coordinates: 31°19′02″N 85°32′35″W
- Country: United States
- State: Alabama
- County: Dale

Area
  - Total: 5.34 sq mi (13.84 km^{2})
  - Land: 5.33 sq mi (13.81 km^{2})
  - Water: 0.0077 sq mi (0.02 km^{2})
- Elevation: 384 ft (117 m)

Population (2020)
  - Total: 582
  - Density: 109.1/sq mi (42.13/km^{2})
- Time zone: UTC-6 (Central (CST))
  - Summer (DST): UTC-5 (CDT)
- ZIP code: 36371
- Area code: 334
- FIPS code: 01-59832
- GNIS feature ID: 2407112
- Website: pinckardal.com

Pinckard is a town in Dale County, Alabama, United States. At the 2020 census, the population was 582. Pinckard incorporated in 1893 and is part of the Ozark Micropolitan Statistical Area.

== Geography ==
Pinckard is located in southeastern Dale County. It is bordered to the east by the town of Midland City and to the northwest by the town of Newton. The northeast border of Pinckard follows the northeast side of U.S. Route 231, a four-lane highway which leads northwest to Ozark, the county seat, and southeast to Dothan.

According to the U.S. Census Bureau, the town of Pinckard has a total area of 5.3 square miles (13.8 km^{2}), of which 0.01 square miles (0.02 km^{2}), or 0.16%, is water.

== Demographics ==
Historical population
Census	Pop.	Note	%±
1900	711		—
1910	541		−23.9%
1920	969		79.1%
1930	633		−34.7%
1940	555		−12.3%
1950	515		−7.2%
1960	578		12.2%
1970	609		5.4%
1980	771		26.6%
1990	618		−19.8%
2000	667		7.9%
2010	647		−3.0%
2020	582		−10.0%
U.S. Decennial Census; 2013 Estimate

As of the census of 2000, there were 667 people, 270 households, and 197 families residing in the town. The population density was 125.0 inhabitants per square mile (48.3/km^{2}). There were 287 housing units at an average density of 53.8 per square mile (20.8/km^{2}). The racial makeup of the town was 78.56% White, 17.84% Black or African American, 0.75% Native American, 0.15% Asian, and 2.70% from two or more races. 3.15% of the population were Hispanic or Latino of any race.

There were 270 households, out of which 26.3% had children under the age of 18 living with them, 60.7% were married couples living together, 11.1% had a female householder with no husband present, and 26.7% were non-families. 24.8% of all households were made up of individuals, and 8.9% had someone living alone who was 65 years of age or older. The average household size was 2.47 and the average family size was 2.96.

In the town, the population was spread out, with 22.2% under the age of 18, 8.2% from 18 to 24, 25.0% from 25 to 44, 28.3% from 45 to 64, and 16.2% who were 65 years of age or older. The median age was 42 years. For every 100 females, there were 101.5 males. For every 100 women age 18 and over, there were 92.9 men.

The median income for a household in the town was $36,875, and the median income for a family was $41,176. Males had a median income of $27,083 versus $18,036 for females. The per capita income for the town was $16,214. About 5.9% of families and 7.1% of the population were below the poverty line, including 10.1% of those under age 18 and 14.5% of those age 65 or over.
