= Dillard, Alabama =

Unincorporated community in Alabama, United States

- Unincorporated community
- Location within Alabama Location within the United States
- Coordinates: 31°31′04″N 85°41′42″W
- Country: United States
- State: Alabama
- County: Dale
- Elevation: 305 ft (93 m)
- Time zone: UTC-6 (Central (CST))
  - Summer (DST): UTC-5 (CDT)
- Area code: 334
- GNIS feature ID: 156270

Dillard, also known as Dillards, is an unincorporated community in Dale County, Alabama, United States.

== History ==
A post office operated under the name Dillard from 1890 to 1906.
