= Grimes, Alabama =

- Town
- Location of Grimes in Dale County, Alabama.
- Coordinates: 31°18′00″N 85°27′01″W
- Country: United States
- State: Alabama
- County: Dale

Area
  - Total: 1.25 sq mi (3.24 km^{2})
  - Land: 1.25 sq mi (3.24 km^{2})
  - Water: 0 sq mi (0.00 km^{2})
- Elevation: 374 ft (114 m)

Population (2020)
  - Total: 573
  - Density: 457.4/sq mi (176.59/km^{2})
- Time zone: UTC-6 (Central (CST))
  - Summer (DST): UTC-5 (CDT)
- FIPS code: 01-32056
- GNIS feature ID: 2406621
- Website: townofgrimes.org

Grimes is a town in Dale County, Alabama, United States. As of the 2020 census, Grimes had a population of 573. It is part of the Enterprise–Ozark Micropolitan Statistical Area.

== Geography ==
Grimes is located in southeastern Dale County. It is partially bordered to the north, south, east, and west by the city of Dothan, and also to the north by the town of Napier Field. Grimes is 7.5 miles (12.1 km) northwest of the center of Dothan.

According to the U.S. Census Bureau, the town has a total area of 1.25 square miles (3.24 km^{2}), all land.

== Demographics ==
Historical population
Census	Pop.	Note	%±
1970	191		—
1980	298		56.0%
1990	443		48.7%
2000	459		3.6%
2010	558		21.6%
2020	573		2.7%
U.S. Decennial Census; 2013 Estimate

As of the census of 2000, there were 459 people, 180 households, and 124 families residing in the town. The population density was 361.9 inhabitants per square mile (139.7/km^{2}). There were 208 housing units at an average density of 164.0 per square mile (63.3/km^{2}). The racial makeup of the town was 60.78% White, 36.38% Black or African American, 0.22% Native American, 0.22% Asian, 0.22% from other races, and 2.18% from two or more races. 0.65% of the population were Hispanic or Latino of any race.

There were 180 households, out of which 33.3% had children under the age of 18 living with them, 47.2% were married couples living together, 17.8% had a female householder with no husband present, and 31.1% were non-families. 23.3% of all households were made up of individuals, and 7.8% had someone living alone who was 65 years of age or older. The average household size was 2.55 and the average family size was 3.01.

In the town, the population was spread out, with 27.9% under the age of 18, 8.7% from 18 to 24, 31.6% from 25 to 44, 21.8% from 45 to 64, and 10.0% who were 65 years of age or older. The median age was 34 years. For every 100 females, there were 86.6 males. For every 100 females age 18 and over, there were 77.0 males.

The median income for a household in the town was $28,839, and the median income for a family was $31,389. Males had a median income of $26,346 versus $19,063 for females. The per capita income for the town was $14,884. About 5.6% of families and 9.6% of the population were below the poverty line, including 13.6% of those under age 18 and 18.2% of those age 65 or over.
