= 15th Alabama Infantry Regiment =

Infantry regiment of the Confederate States Army

- Flag of Alabama in 1861 (obverse and reverse)
- Active: July 3, 1861 – April 9, 1865
- Country: Confederate States of America
- Branch: Confederate States Army
- Role: Infantry
- Equipment: Mississippi Rifles (Co's A-B); altered smooth-bore "George Law" muskets (Co's C-L). Later issued Enfield and Springfield rifle-muskets.
- Engagements: Valley Campaign; Malvern Hill; Second Manassas; Antietam; Fredericksburg; Gettysburg; Chickamauga; Knoxville Campaign; The Wilderness; Spotsylvania Court House; Cold Harbor; Siege of Petersburg; Appomattox Campaign

Commanders
- Notable commanders: James Cantey; William C. Oates; Alexander Lowther; Francis Key Schaff; Robert C. Norris

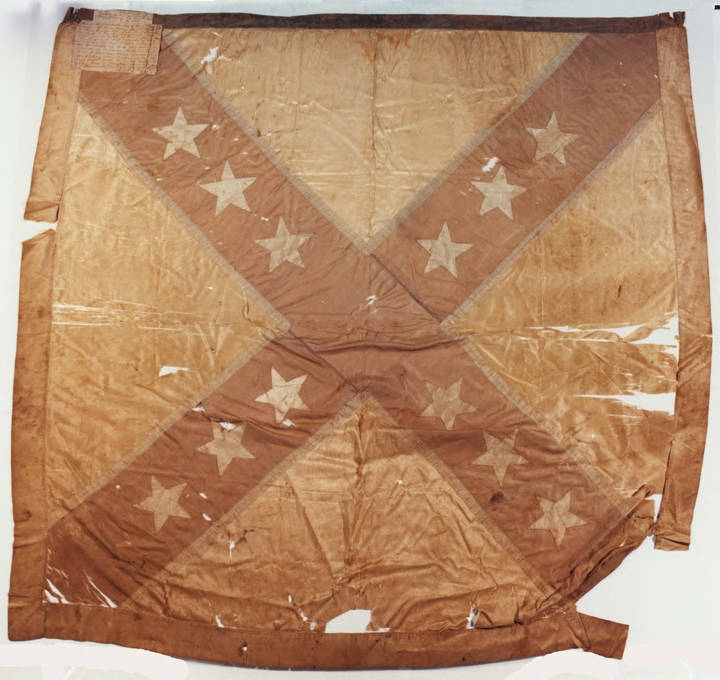
15th Alabama Infantry flag

The 15th Alabama Infantry Regiment was a Confederate volunteer infantry unit from the state of Alabama during the American Civil War. Recruited from six counties in the southeastern part of the state, it fought mostly with Robert E. Lee's Army of Northern Virginia, though it also saw brief service with Braxton Bragg and the Army of Tennessee in late 1863 before returning to Virginia in early 1864 for the duration of the war. Out of 1,958 men listed on the regimental rolls throughout the conflict, 261 are known to have fallen in battle, with sources listing an additional 416 deaths due to disease. 218 were captured (46 died), 66 deserted and 61 were transferred or discharged. By the end of the war, only 170 men remained to be paroled.

The 15th Alabama is most famous for being the regiment that confronted the 20th Maine on Little Round Top during the Battle of Gettysburg on July 2, 1863. after several ferocious assaults, the 15th Alabama was ultimately able to dislodge the Union troops, but was eventually forced to retreat in the face of a desperate bayonet charge led by the 20th Maine's commander, Col. Joshua L. Chamberlain. This assault was recreated in Ronald F. Maxwell's 1993 film Gettysburg.

== Recruitment, organization and equipment ==
=== Recruitment ===
The 15th Alabama Infantry Regiment was organized by James Cantey, a planter originally from South Carolina, who was residing in Russell County, Alabama, at the outset of the Civil War. "Cantey's Rifles" formed at Ft. Mitchell, on the Chattahoochee River, in May 1861. Cantey's company was joined by ten other militia companies, all of which were sworn into state service by governor Andrew B. Moore on July 3, 1861, with Cantey as Regimental Commander.

One of these companies, from Henry County, was formed by William C. Oates, a lawyer and newspaperman from Abbeville. Oates, who would later command the whole regiment at Little Round Top, put together a company composed mostly of Irishmen recruited from the area, calling them "Henry Pioneers" or "Henry County Pioneers". Other observers, after seeing their colorful uniforms (bright red shirts, with Richmond grey frock coats and trousers), dubbed them "Oates' Zouaves".

According to one source, the youngest private in the 15th Alabama was only thirteen years old; the oldest, Edmond Shepherd, was seventy.

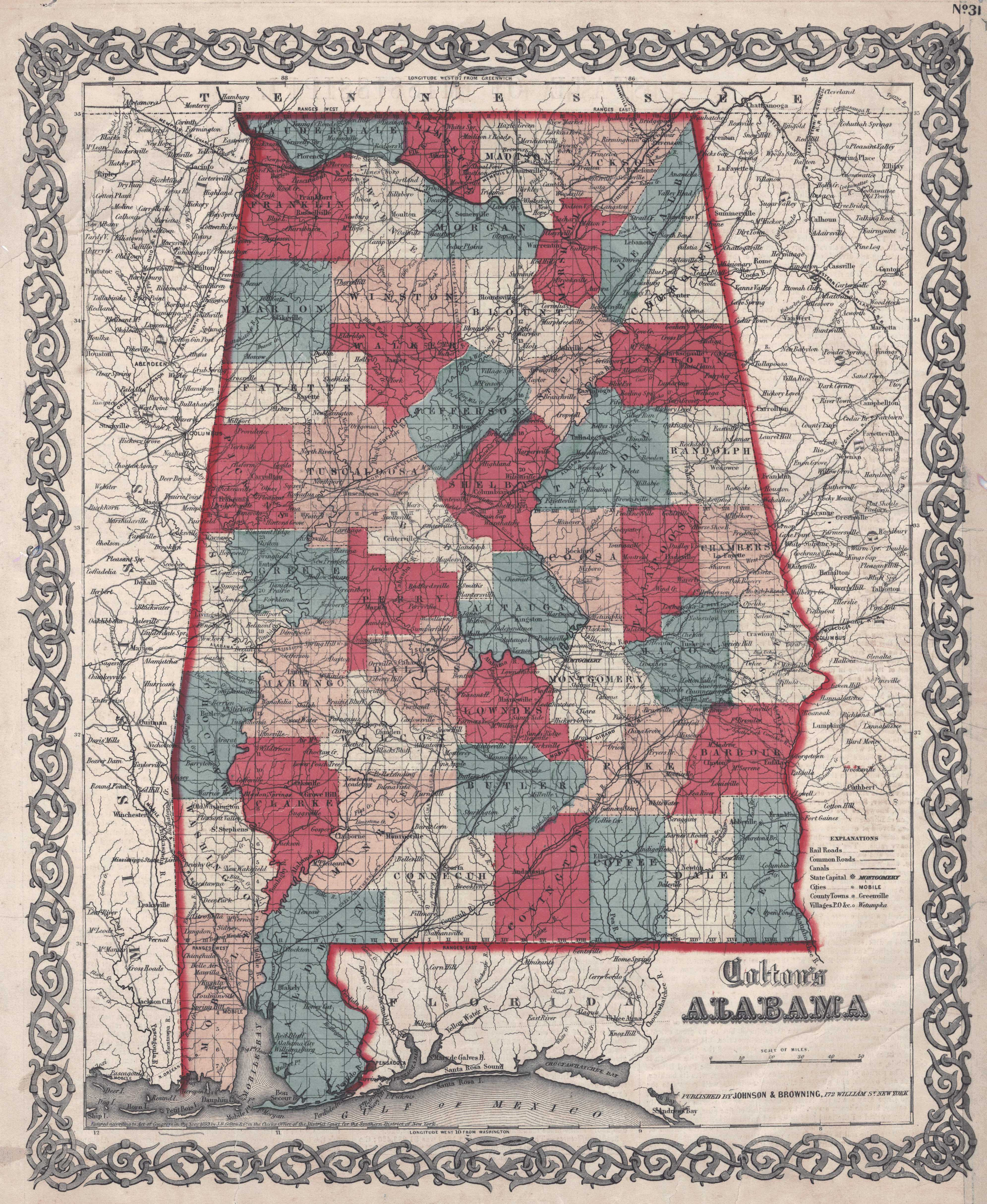
1859 map of Alabama counties. The 15th Alabama was recruited from counties in the southeastern portion of the state.

=== Organization ===
The 15th initially consisted of approximately 900 men; its companies, and their counties of origin, were:

- Co. "A", known as "Cantey's Rifles", from Russell County;
- Co. "B", known as the "Midway Southern Guards", from Barbour County;
- Co. "C", no nickname given, from Macon County;
- Co. "D", known as the "Fort Browder Roughs", from Barbour County;
- Co. "E", known as the "Beauregards", from Dale County (which then included parts of present-day Geneva and Houston counties);
- Co. "F", known as the "Brundidge Guards", from Pike County;
- Co. "G", known as the "Henry Pioneers", from Henry County (which then included nearly all of present-day Houston County);
- Co. "H", known as the "Glenville Guards", from Barbour and Dale counties;
- Co. "I", "Quitman Guards", from Pike County;
- Co. "K", known as the "Eufaula City Guard", from Barbour County; and
- Co. "L", no nickname given, from Pike County.

Following its formal swearing-in, the 15th Alabama was ordered to Pageland Field, Virginia, for training and drill. During their sojourn at Pageland, the regiment lost 150 men to measles. In September 1861, the 15th was transferred to Camp Toombes, Virginia, in part to escape the measles outbreak. Despite the move, over 200 members of the regiment died of smallpox that winter.

=== Equipment ===
Companies "A" and "B" of the 15th Alabama were equipped with the M1841 Mississippi Rifle, a .54 caliber percussion rifle that had seen extensive service in the Mexican–American War and was highly regarded for its accuracy and ease of use. The other companies in the regiment were given older "George Law" smoothbore muskets, which had been converted from flintlocks to percussion rifles. Later, the regiment received British Pattern 1853 Enfield rifle-muskets and Springfield Model 1861 rifled muskets. Since the 15th had initially enlisted for three years, it received its arms from the Confederate government, which refused to provide weapons to any regiment enlisting for a lesser period.

While details of the specific uniforms worn by other companies of the 15th has not been preserved, Oates' Co. "G" is recorded to have sported, in addition to their red and gray clothing, a "colorful and diverse attire of headgear". Each cap bore an "HP" insignia, which stood for "Henry Pioneers" (though some said it actually meant "Hell's Pelters"). Each soldier also wore a "secession badge", with the motto: "Liberty, Equality and Fraternity", which had been the motto of the French Revolution.

== Early service and campaigns ==
=== Valley Campaign ===
At Camp Toombs, the 15th Alabama was brigaded with the 21st Georgia Volunteer Infantry, the 21st North Carolina Infantry Regiment and the 16th Mississippi Infantry regiments in Trimble's Brigade of Ewell's Division, part of the Confederate Army of Northern Virginia. After that force moved over toward Yorktown, the 15th was transferred to Maj. Gen. Stonewall Jackson's division, where it participated in his Valley Campaign. During this time, the 15th participated in the following engagements:

- Battle of Front Royal on May 23, 1862; negligible losses.
- First Battle of Winchester on May 25, 1862; negligible losses.
- Battle of Cross Keys on June 8, 1862; 9 killed and 33 wounded, out of 426 engaged.

Following the Battle of Cross Keys, the 15th was mentioned in dispatches by its division commander, Maj. Gen. Ewell, who stated that "the regiment made a gallant resistance, enabling me to take position at leisure". Its brigade commander, Brig. Gen. Trimble, also singled out the regiment for honors during this engagement: "to Colonel Cantey for his skillful retreat from picket, and prompt flank maneuver, I think special praise is due". During this particular engagement, soldiers of the 15th Alabama had the unusual opportunity of participating in every major phase of a single battle, starting with the opening skirmish at Union Church on the forward left flank, followed by withdrawing beneath the artillery duel in the center, and then finally participating in Trimble's ambush of the 8th New York and subsequent counterattack on the Confederate right flank, which brought the battle to its conclusion.

=== Seven Days Battles ===
Following the victorious conclusion of Jackson's Valley Campaign, the 15th participated in Jackson's attack on Maj. Gen. George B. McClellan's flank during the Seven Days Battles. During this time, the 15th fought in the following sorties:

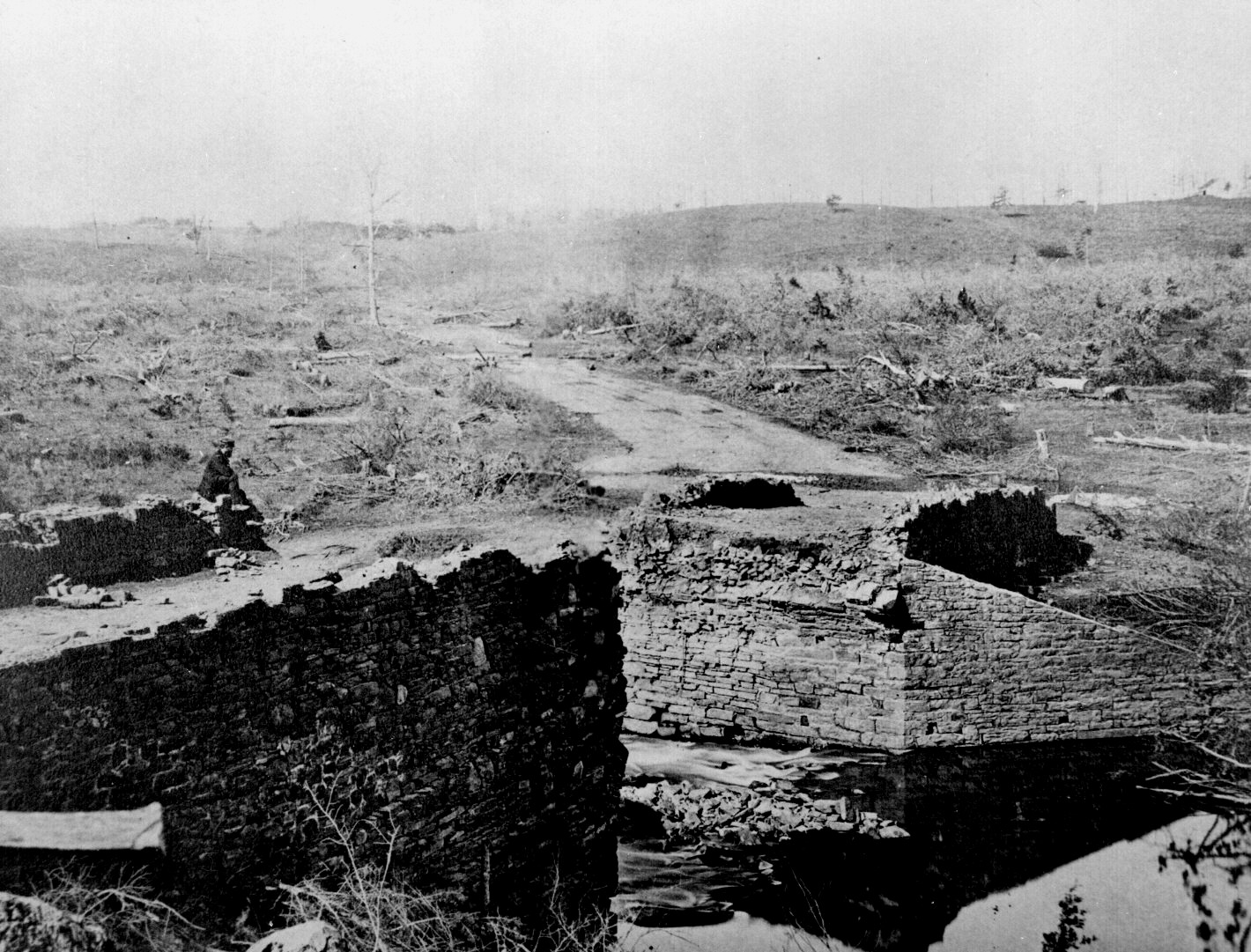
Second Battle of Manassas battlefield

- Battle of Gaines' Mill on June 27–28, 1862; 34 killed and 110 wounded, out of 412 engaged.
- Battle of Malvern Hill on July 1, 1862; negligible losses.

=== Northern Virginia Campaign ===
Following McClellan's retreat from Richmond, the 15th was engaged in the Northern Virginia Campaign, where it participated in the following battles:

- Battle of Warrenton Springs Ford on August 12, 1862; losses not given.
- Battle of Hazel River, Virginia, on August 22, 1862; losses not given.
- Battle of Kettle Run (called "Manassas Junction" in regimental records) on August 30, 1862; 6 killed and 22 wounded.
- Second Battle of Manassas, on August 30, 1862; 21 killed and 91 wounded, out of 440 engaged.
- Battle of Chantilly, on September 1, 1862; 4 killed and 14 wounded.

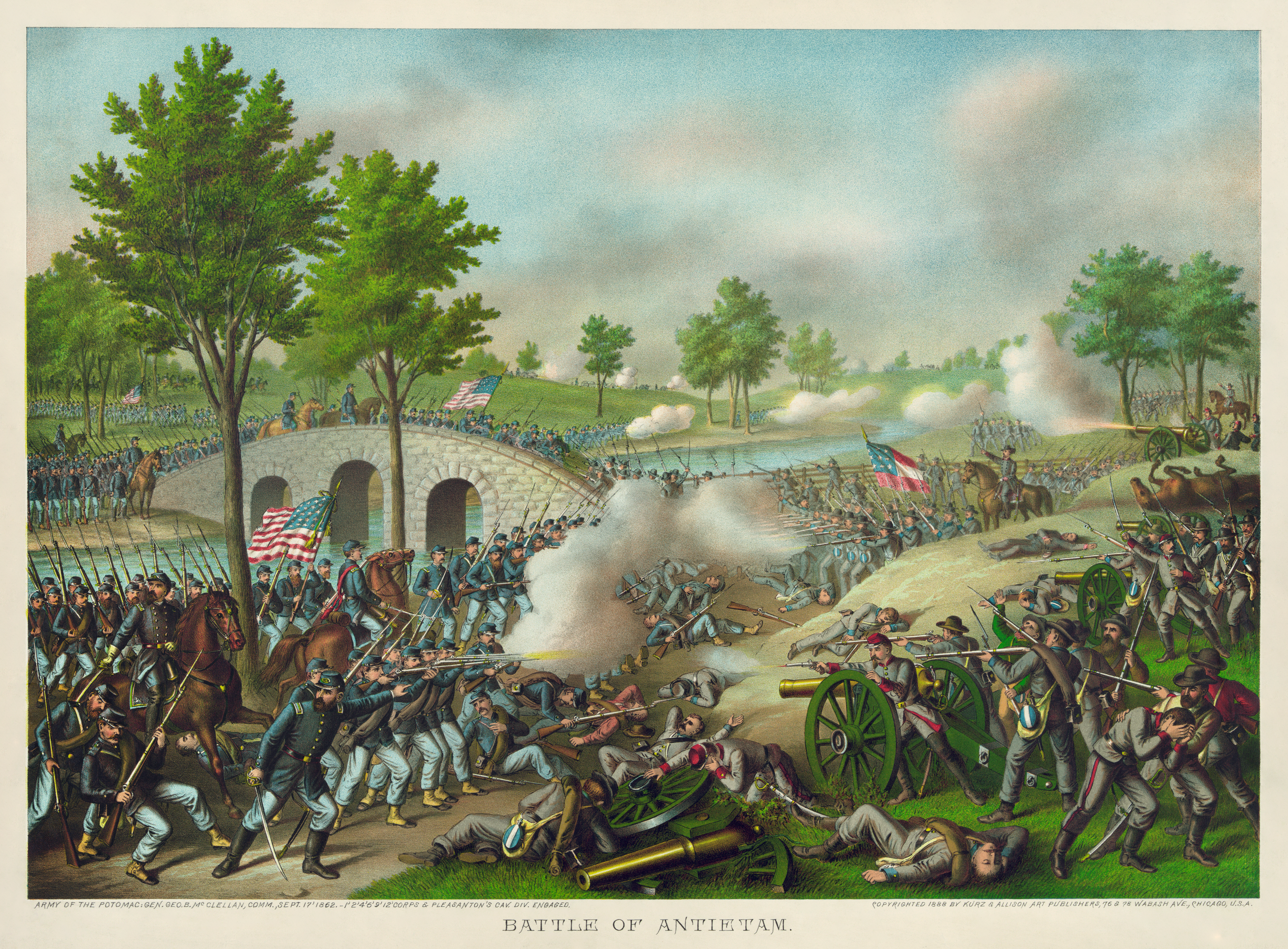
Battle of Antietam by Kurz and Allison

=== Maryland Campaign ===
Next up was Lee's Maryland Campaign, where the 15th Alabama saw action at:

- Battle of Harper's Ferry from September 12–15, 1862; negligible losses.
- Battle of Antietam (called "Sharpsburg" in regimental records) on September 17, 1862; 9 killed and 75 wounded, out of 300 engaged.
- Battle of Shepherdstown on September 19, 1862; losses not given.

After Antietam, acting brigade commander Col. James A. Walker cited Cpt. Isaac B. Feagin, acting regimental commander, for outstanding performance while extolling the regiment as a whole: "Captain Feagin, commanding the Fifteenth Alabama regiment, behaved with a gallantry consistent with his high reputation for courage and that of the regiment he commanded".

=== Fredericksburg and Suffolk; reassignment ===
Following the Confederate defeat at Antietam, the 15th Alabama participated with Jackson's corps at the Battle of Fredericksburg on December 15, 1862. Total casualties there were 1 killed and 34 wounded. The regiment was then reassigned in May 1863 to General James Longstreet's corps, which was then participating in the Siege of Suffolk, Virginia. Here it formed part of the newly created "Alabama Brigade" under Evander Law in General Hood's division, The 15th and lost 4 killed and 18 wounded at Suffolk.

=== The Great Snowball Fight ===
On January 29, 1863, the 15th Alabama participated with several other regiments of the Army of Northern Virginia in what became known as "The Great Snowball Fight of 1863". Over 9000 Confederate soldiers engaged in a spontaneous, day-long free-for-all using snowballs and rocks, in which only two soldiers were seriously injured (neither from the 15th).

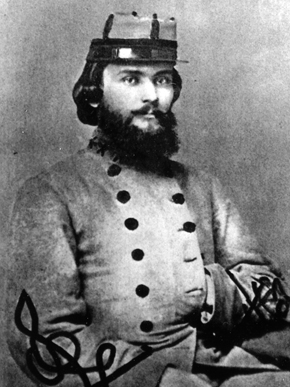
LTC William C. Oates, commander of the 15th Alabama Infantry from Spring of 1863 to July 1864

== Oates takes command ==
Along with its change in Divisional assignment, the 15th Alabama received a new regimental commander: Lt. Col. William C. Oates, who had originally organized Co. "G" when the regiment first formed in 1861. Oates had lived a drifter's existence in Texas during his early adulthood, participating in numerous street brawls and spending time as a gambler. However, by 1861 he had returned to Alabama, finished his schooling, studied law, and set up a successful practice in Henry County that also included ownership of a weekly newspaper in his hometown. Opposed to Abraham Lincoln's election, Oates cautioned against precipitate secession; however, once Alabama decided to leave the Union, he threw himself wholeheartedly into the Southern cause, raising a company of volunteers that became Co. "G" of the 15th Alabama. After Cantey's promotion and transfer to a new position, Oates assumed command of the regiment as a whole. In later years, Oates would serve as Governor of Alabama, and would also command three U.S. Brigades (none of which saw combat) during the Spanish–American War.

While some of his men thought Oates to be too aggressive for his own good and theirs, most admired his courage and affirmed that he was always to be found at the front of his men, in the thick of combat, and that he never asked them to go anywhere that he was not willing to go himself. A political rival, Alexander Lowther, would replace Oates as regimental commander in July 1864 after allegedly engineering Oates' removal from command. It was Oates, however, who led the 15th Alabama into its most noted engagement of the war, at Little Round Top on July 2, 1863, during the second day of the Battle of Gettysburg.

== Action at Gettysburg ==
=== Little Round Top ===
During the Battle of Gettysburg, the 15th Alabama and the rest of Law's Brigade formed part of Maj. Gen. John B. Hood's division, which was a part of Lt. Gen. James Longstreet's corps. Arriving on the field late in the evening on July 1, the 15th played no appreciable role in the contest's first day. This changed on the 2nd, as Gen. Robert E. Lee had ordered Longstreet to launch a surprise attack with two of his divisions against the Federal left flank and their positions atop Cemetery Hill. During the course of this engagement, which was launched late in the afternoon of July 2, the 15th Alabama found itself advancing over rough terrain on the eastern side of the Emmitsburg Road, which combined with fire from the 2nd U.S. Sharpshooters at nearby Slyder's Farm to compel Law's brigade (including the 15th Alabama) to detour around the Devil's Den and over the Big Round Top toward Little Round Top. During this time, the 15th was under constant fire from Federal sharpshooters, and the regiment became temporarily separated from the rest of the Alabama brigade as it made its way over Big Round Top.

Little Round Top, which dominated the Union position on Cemetery Ridge, was initially unoccupied by Union troops. Union commander Maj. Gen. George Meade's chief engineer, Brig. Gen Gouverneur K. Warren, had climbed the hill on his superior's orders to assess the situation there; he noticed the glint of Confederate bayonets to the hill's southwest, and realized that a Southern attack was imminent. Warren's frantic cry for reinforcements to occupy the hill was answered by Col. Strong Vincent, commanding the Third Brigade of the First Division of the Union V Corps. Vincent rapidly moved the four regiments of his brigade onto the hill, only ten minutes ahead of the approaching Confederates. Under heavy fire from Southern batteries, Vincent arranged his four regiments atop the hill with the 16th Michigan to the northwest, then proceeding counterclockwise with the 44th New York, the 83rd Pennsylvania, and finally, at the end of the line on the southern slope, the 20th Maine. With only minutes to spare, Vincent told his regiments to take cover and await the inevitable Confederate assault; he specifically ordered Col. Joshua L. Chamberlain, commanding the 20th Maine (at the extreme end of the Union line), to hold his position to the last man, at all costs. Were Chamberlain's regiment to be forced to retreat, the other regiments on the hill would be compelled to follow suit, and the entire left flank of Meade's army would be in serious jeopardy, possibly leading them to retreat and giving the Confederates their desperately needed victory at Gettysburg.

=== The 15th Alabama attacks ===
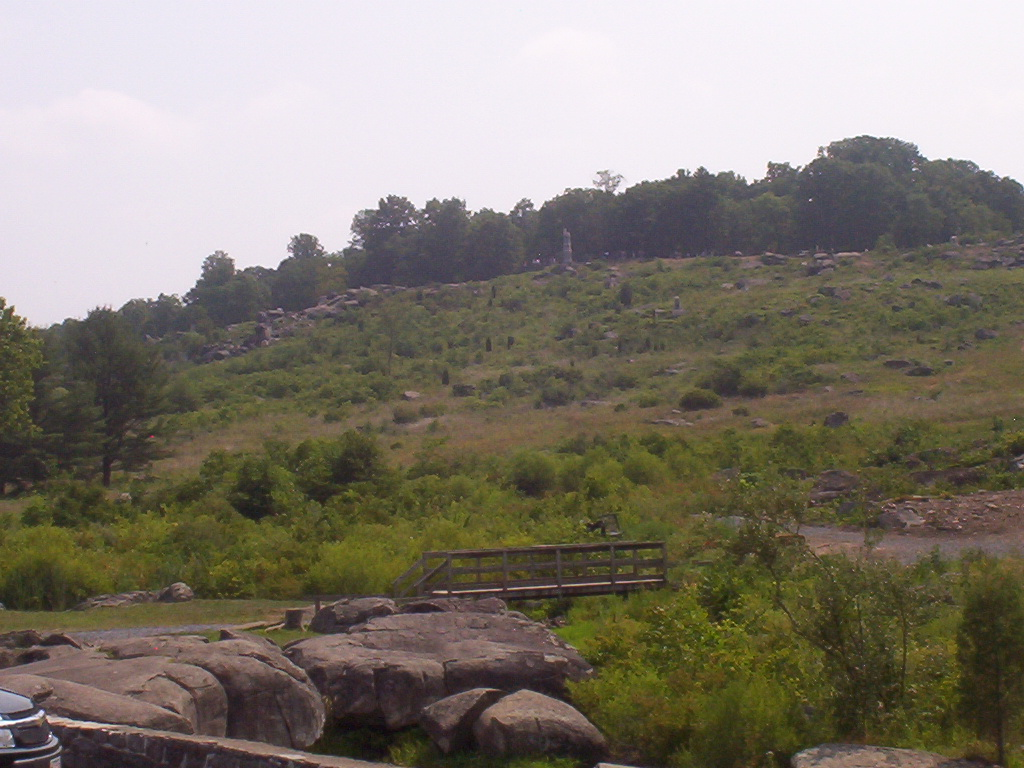
Little Round Top today, seen from the Devil's Den. The 15th Alabama's assault was made on the portion of the hill lying to the far right in this photo.

Battle of Little Round Top, initial assault, showing the 15th Alabama's initial position

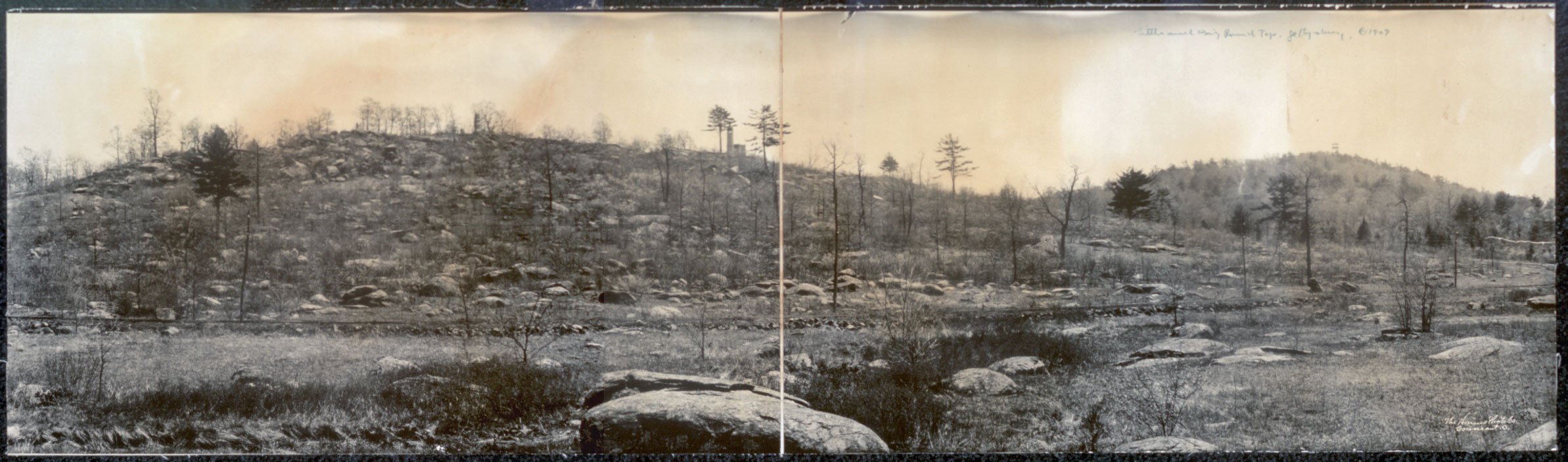
Little Round Top (left) and Big Round Top, photographed from Plum Run Valley in 1909

In their attack on Little Round Top, the 15th Alabama would be joined by the 4th and 47th Alabama Infantry, and also by the 4th and 5th Texas Infantry regiments. All of these units were thoroughly exhausted at the time of the assault, having marched in the July heat for over 20 miles (37 kilometers) prior to the actual attack. Furthermore, the canteens of the Southerners were empty, and Law's command to advance did not give them time to refill them. Approaching the Union line on the crest of the hill, Law's men were thrown back by the first Union volley and withdrew briefly to regroup. The 15th Alabama repositioned itself further to the right, attempting to find the Union left flank which, unbeknownst to it, was held by Chamberlain's 20th Maine.

Chamberlain, meanwhile, had detached Company "B" of his regiment and elements of the 2nd U.S. Sharpshooters, ordering them to take a concealed position behind a stone wall 150 yards to his east, hoping to guard against a Confederate envelopment.

Seeing the 15th Alabama shifting around his flank, Chamberlain ordered the remainder of his 385 men to form a single-file line. The 15th Alabama charged the Maine troops, only to be repulsed by furious rifle fire. Chamberlain next ordered the southernmost half of his line to "refuse the line", meaning that they formed a new line at an angle to the original force, to meet the 15th Alabama's flanking maneuver. Though it endured incredible losses, the 20th Maine managed to hold through five more charges by the 15th over a ninety-minute period. Col. Oates, commanding the regiment, described the action in his memoirs, forty years later:

Vincent's brigade, consisting of the Sixteenth Michigan on the right, Forty-fourth New York, Eighty-third Pennsylvania, and Twentieth Maine regiments, reached this position ten minutes before my arrival, and they piled a few rocks from boulder to boulder, making the zigzag line more complete, and were concealed behind it ready to receive us. From behind this ledge, unexpectedly to us, because concealed, they poured into us the most destructive fire I ever saw. Our line halted, but did not break. The enemy was formed in line as named from their right to left. ... As men fell their comrades closed the gap, returning the fire most spiritedly. I could see through the smoke men of the Twentieth Maine in front of my right wing running from tree to tree back westward toward the main body, and I advanced my right, swinging it around, overlapping and turning their left. I ordered my regiment to change direction to the left, swing around, and drive the Federals from the ledge of rocks, for the purpose of enfilading their line ... gain the enemy's rear, and drive him from the hill. My men obeyed and advanced about half way to the enemy's position, but the fire was so destructive that my line wavered like a man trying to walk against a strong wind, and then slowly, doggedly, gave back a little; then with no one upon the left or right of me, my regiment exposed, while the enemy was still under cover, to stand there and die was sheer folly; either to retreat or advance became a necessity. ... Captain [Henry C.] Brainard, one of the bravest and best officers in the regiment, in leading his company forward, fell, exclaiming, "O God! that I could see my mother," and instantly expired. Lieutenant John A. Oates, my dear brother, succeeded to the command of the company, but was pierced through by a number of bullets, and fell mortally wounded. Lieutenant [Barnett H.] Cody fell mortally wounded, Captain [William C.] Bethune and several other officers were seriously wounded, while the carnage in the ranks was appalling. I again ordered the advance, knowing the officers and men of that gallant old regiment, I felt sure that they would follow their commanding officer anywhere in the line of duty. I passed through the line waving my sword, shouting, "Forward, men, to the ledge!" and promptly followed by the command in splendid style. We drove the Federals from their strong defensive position; five times they rallied and charged us, twice coming so near that some of my men had to use the bayonet, but in vain was their effort. It was our time now to deal death and destruction to a gallant foe, and the account was speedily settled. I led this charge and sprang upon the ledge of rock, using my pistol within musket length, when the rush of my men drove the Maine men from the ledge. ... About forty steps up the slope there is a large boulder about midway the Spur. The Maine regiment charged my line, coming right up in a hand-to-hand encounter. My regimental colors were just a step or two to the right of that boulder, and I was within ten feet. A Maine man reached to grasp the staff of the colors when Ensign [John G.] Archibald stepped back and Sergeant Pat O'Connor stove his bayonet through the head of the Yankee, who fell dead.

=== Chamberlain's desperate charge ===
Out of ammunition, and facing what he was sure would be yet another determined assault by the Alabamians, Col. Chamberlain decided upon a most unorthodox response: ordering his men to fix bayonets, he led what was left of his outfit in a pell-mell charge down the hill, executing a combined frontal assault and flanking maneuver that caught the 15th Alabama completely by surprise. Unbeknownst to Chamberlain, Oates had already decided to retreat, realizing that his ammunition was running low, and worried about a possible Union attack on his own flank or rear. His younger brother lay dying on the field, and the blood from his regiment's dead and wounded "was standing in puddles on some of the rocks". Hardly had Oates ordered the withdrawal than Chamberlain began his charge, which combined with fire from "B" company and the hidden sharpshooters to cause the 15th to rush madly down the hill to escape. Oates later admitted that "we ran like a herd of wild cattle" during the retreat, which took those surviving members of the 15th (including Oates) who weren't captured by Chamberlain's men up the slopes of Big Round Top and toward Confederate lines.

In later years, Oates would assert that the 15th Alabama's assault had failed because no other Confederate regiment appeared in support of his unit during the attack. He insisted that if but one other regiment had joined his attack on the far left of the Union army, they would have swept the 20th Maine from the hill and turned the Union flank, "which would have forced Meade's whole left wing to retire".

However, Oates also paid tribute to the courage and tenacity of his enemy when he wrote: "There never were harder fighters than the Twentieth Maine men and their gallant Colonel. His skill and persistency and the great bravery of his men saved Little Round Top and the Army of the Potomac from defeat." Chamberlain in turn extolled the bravery of his Alabama foes when he later wrote: "these [the 15th Alabama] were manly men, whom we could befriend and by no means kill, if they came our way in peace and good will".

The 15th Alabama spent the remainder of the Battle of Gettysburg on the Confederate right flank, helping to secure it against Union cavalry and sharpshooters. It took no part in Pickett's Charge on July 3.

Out of 644 men engaged from the 15th Alabama at the Battle of Gettysburg, the regiment lost 72 men killed, 190 wounded, and 81 missing.

== From Gettysburg to Appomattox ==
=== Immediate aftermath ===
Following the action at Gettysburg, the 15th Alabama was briefly engaged at Battle Mountain, Virginia, on July 17, reporting negligible losses. It then spent time recuperating and refitting in Virginia with the rest of Longstreet's corps, until being ordered west to bolster the Confederate Army of Tennessee under Braxton Bragg, which was operating in eastern Tennessee and northwestern Georgia.

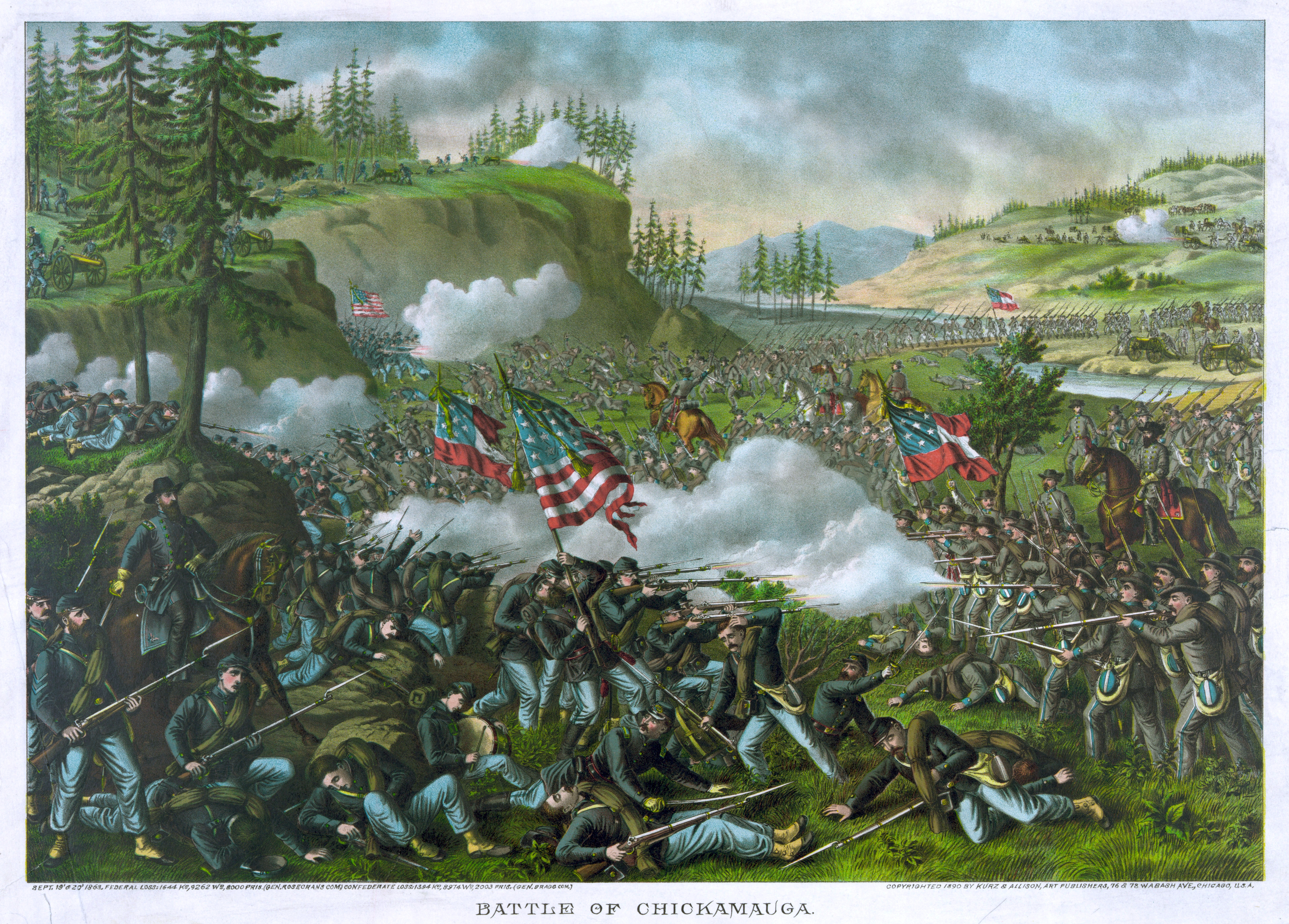
Battle of Chickamauga, by Kurz and Allison, 1890

=== In Tennessee ===
During its time with Longstreet in the Army of Tennessee, the 15th Alabama participated in the following engagements:

- Battle of Chickamauga on September 19–20, 1863; 19 killed and 123 wounded, out of 425 engaged.
- Battle of Moccasin Point, Tennessee, on September 30, 1863; no losses given.
- Battles of Browns Ferry and Lookout Valley on October 28–29, 1863; 15 killed and 40 wounded.
- Battle of Campbell's Station on November 25, 1863; no losses given.
- Knoxville Campaign from November 17 to December 4, 1863; 6 killed and 21 wounded.
- Battle of Bean's Station on December 14, 1863; negligible losses.
- Battle of Danridge on January 24, 1864; no losses given.

The 15th Alabama was the principal Confederate regiment guarding the Lookout Valley during the Union attack there; due to miscommunication between himself and three reserve regiments assigned to augment his force, Col. Oates was unable to effectively counterattack the Union force advancing up the valley from Brown's Ferry on the Tennessee River. The resulting Federal victory allowed the opening of Ulysses S. Grant's famous "Cracker Line", which contributed to the breaking of the Confederate Siege of Chattanooga. Oates himself was wounded in this battle, but later recovered and continued to lead his regiment until replaced by Alexander A. Lowther in July 1864.

For its actions during the Battle of Chickamauga, the 15th was once again mentioned in dispatches, this time by Brig. Gen. Zachariah C. Deas, who wrote that the "regiment behaved with great gallantry" during the battle.

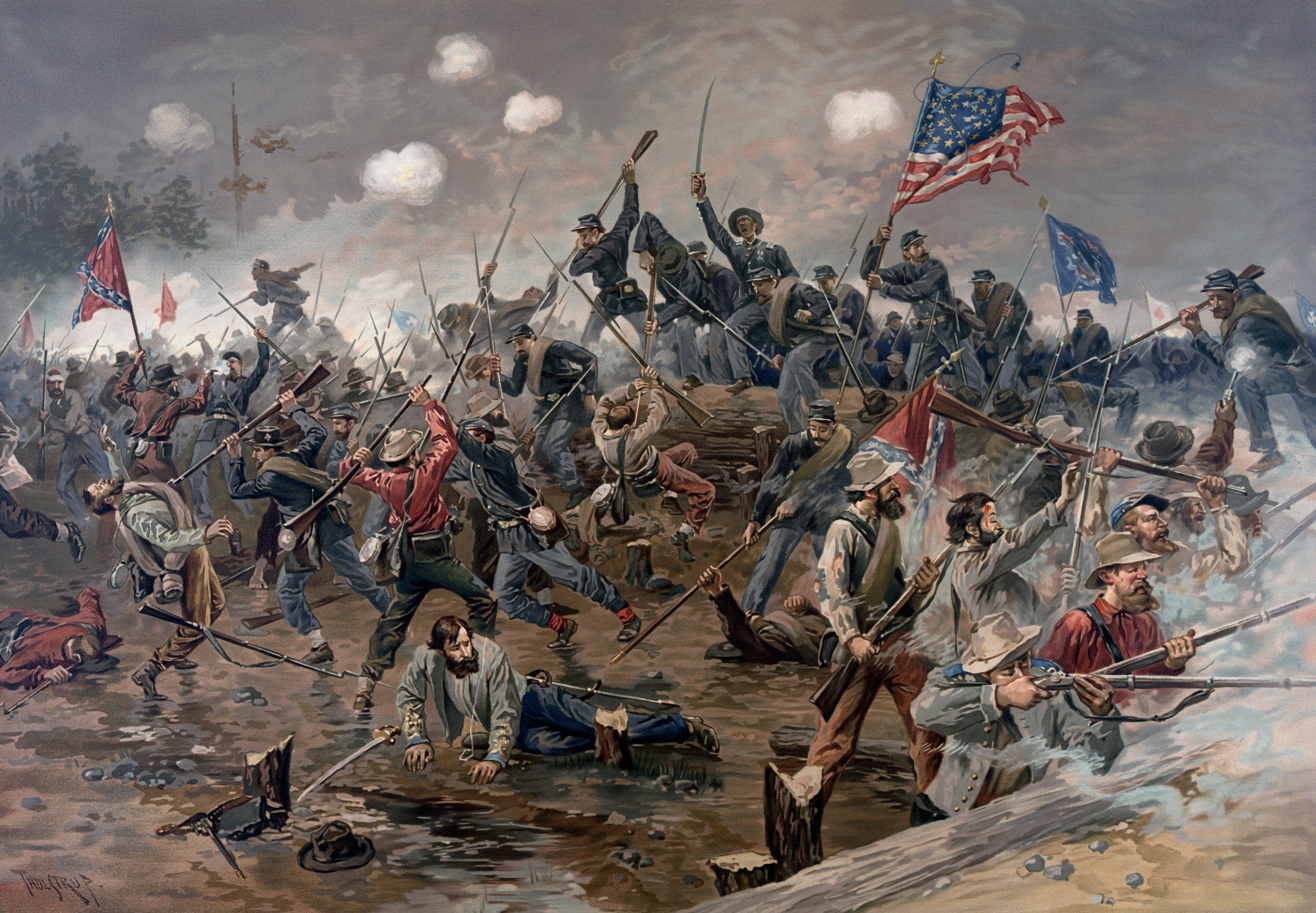
Battle of Spotsylvania Court House, painted by Thure De Thulstrup

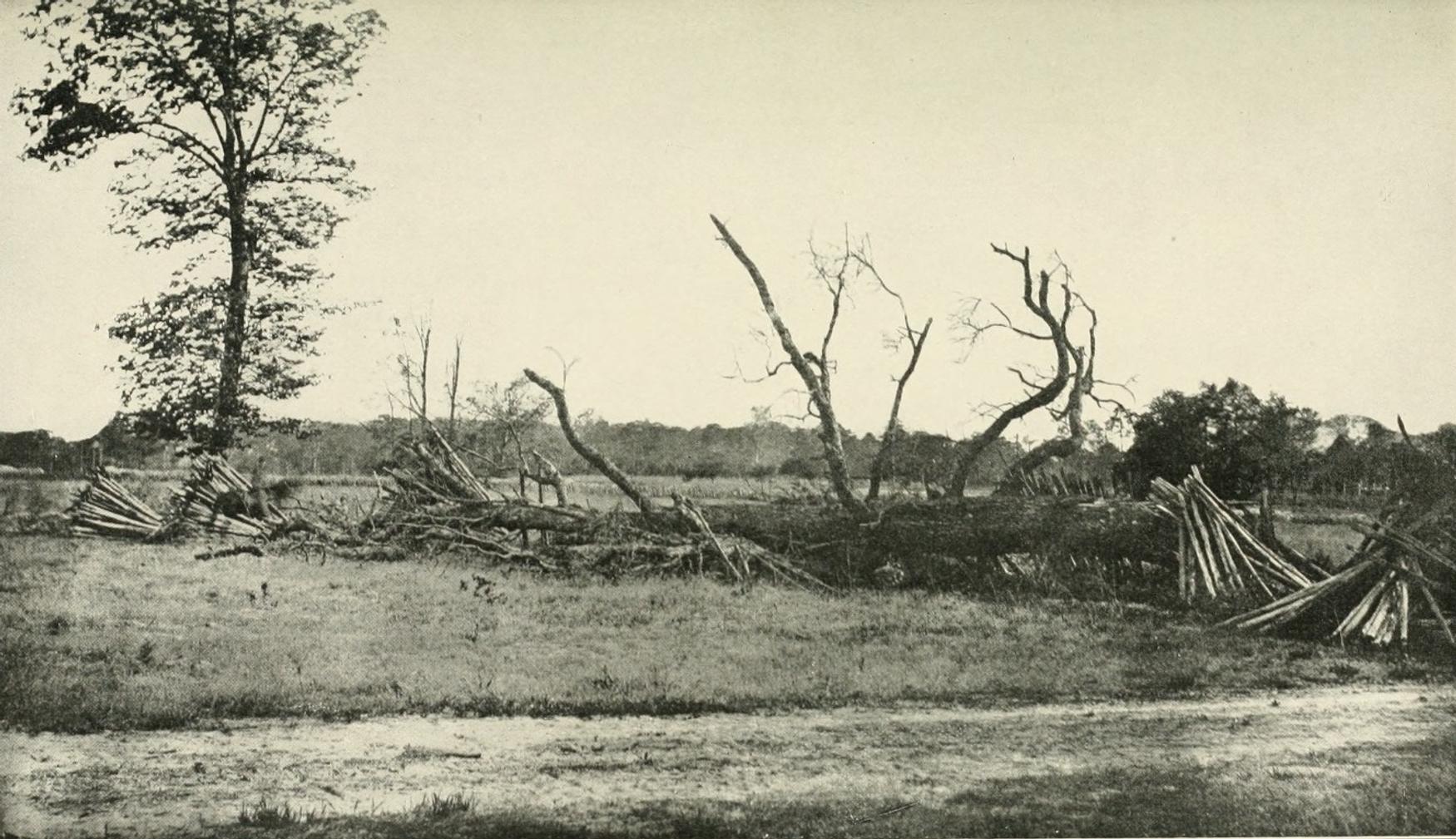
Confederate breastworks at the Battle of Cold Harbor, 1864

=== Return to Virginia ===
Having quarrelled with Bragg during his time in Tennessee, Longstreet decided to return to Virginia with his corps (including the 15th Alabama) in the spring of 1864. Here, the 15th participated in the following engagements:

- Battle of the Wilderness from May 5 to 7, 1864; 4 killed and 27 wounded, with 11 captured.
- Battle of Spotsylvania Court House from May 8 to 21, 1864; 18 killed and 48 wounded, with 2 captured.
- Battle of North Anna on May 24, 1864; 1 wounded.
- Battle of Ashland on May 31, 1864; 1 killed.
- Battle of Cold Harbor on July 1, 1864; 5 killed and 12 wounded.
- Battle of Chester Station on July 17, 1864; no losses given.
- Siege of Petersburg from June 18–26 of 1864, July 19 to 25, 1864, and April 2, 1865; total losses 3 killed and 2 wounded.
- Battle of New Market Heights (not to be confused with the Battle of New Market) on August 14 and 15, 1864; no losses given.
- Battle of Fussell's Mill on August 14, 1864; 13 killed and 90 wounded.
- Battle of Ft. Gilmer on September 29, 1864; 1 wounded.
- Battle of Ft. Harrison on September 30, 1864; 6 killed and 6 wounded.
- Battle of Darbytown Road on October 7 and 13, 1864; 2 killed and 36 wounded.
- Battle of Williamsburg Road on October 27, 1864; no losses given.
- Appomattox Campaign from March 29 to April 9, 1865; no losses given.

The 15th Alabama continued to serve until the surrender of Lee's army at Appomattox Court House on April 9. It was paroled together with the rest of the Army of Northern Virginia, and its surviving members made their way back to Alabama where they resumed their lives as civilians. At the time of its surrender, the 15th had been transferred to Perry's "Florida Brigade", under the command of Col. David Lang. Only seventeen officers and 170 men of the 15th Alabama Infantry surrendered at Appomattox.

The regimental commander at the time of surrender was Capt. Francis Key Schaff, formerly of Co. "A".

== Roll of Honor ==
The Confederate government named twenty-three members of the 15th Alabama to the Confederate Roll of Honor during the Civil War:

- Charles E. Averett, Company "A" [Actual name: Pvt. Alvis Early Averett];
- Brantley G. Barnett (SGT), Company "I";
- J. F. Bean, Company "L";
- David C. Cannon, Company "G";
- T. R. Collins, Company "L";
- William H. Cooper, Company "C";
- James R. Edwards (SGT, later 2LT), Company "E";
- Clark J. Fauk, Company "K";
- H. V. Glenn, Company "F";
- Evan Grice, Company "K";
- M. L. Harper (killed), Company "B";
- Woodruff F. Hill (CPL), Company "K";
- A. Jackson, Company "F";
- John Jackson, Company "F";
- William W. Johnson (SGT), Company "D";
- R. Sam Jones (CPL), Company "D";
- Lee Lloyd, Company "L".
- B. J. Martin, Company "E";
- Abraham Powell, Company "E";
- W. H. Quattlebaum, Company "D";
- Joseph T. Rushing, Company "I";
- Herrin F. Satcher (CPL), Company "G".
- Allen H. Baxter (CPL), Company "K";

== One last battle ==
In 1904 and 1905, an aged William Oates and Joshua Chamberlain waged what one writer described as "one last battle" over the proposed construction of a monument on the Little Round Top to the 15th Alabama. While Chamberlain indicated that he had no quarrel whatsoever to the erection of a memorial to his old enemies, he strenuously objected to the precise spot proposed by Oates, which he insisted was farther up the hill than Oates' regiment had actually gotten during the battle. A somewhat-testy exchange of letters between the two men failed to resolve their differences, and no monument to the 15th Alabama was ever erected. Chamberlain had visited the battlefield several years after the war, and had personally directed the removal of a pile of stones placed atop Little Round Top by veterans of the 15th Alabama. At the time, as he did later in his conflict with Oates, Chamberlain stated that he had no objections to the erection of a monument to the 15th, but not atop the hill that so many of his men had died to hold. More recent efforts to create a pile of stones atop the Little Round Top have been foiled by Gettysburg park rangers.

== Modern re-enactment groups ==
The 15th Alabama has proven popular with modern historical reenactors. One such group (recreating Co. "G", 15th Alabama Infantry) is headquartered in Bellingham, Washington, while another (recreating Co. "E", 15th Alabama Infantry) is located in Enterprise, Alabama. Other units are found in Farmington, Maine (recreating Co. "G") and in Ocala, Florida (recreating Co. "B").

== See also ==
- List of Confederate units from Alabama
- 33rd Regiment Alabama Infantry – Another infantry regiment recruited in 1862 from this same area. It served in the Army of Tennessee, mostly under General Patrick Cleburne.

== Works cited ==
- Barnett, Gene. The Glorious Old Fifteenth: A History of the Fifteenth Alabama Infantry Regiment in the Confederate States Army. 1995. OCLC 34664965.
- Cozzens, Peter, The Shipwreck of Their Hopes: The Battles for Chattanooga, Chicago: University of Illinois Press, 1994, ISBN 0-252-01922-9.
- Desjardin, Thomas A.: Stand Firm Ye Boys from Maine: The 20th Maine and the Gettysburg Campaign, Thomas Publications, 1995, ISBN 1-57747-034-6.
- Eicher, David J., The Longest Night: A Military History of the Civil War, Simon & Schuster, 2001, ISBN 0-684-84944-5.
- Harman, Troy D., Lee's Real Plan at Gettysburg, Stackpole Books, 2003, ISBN 0-8117-0054-2.
- Oates, William C. The War Between the Union and the Confederacy and Its Lost Opportunities Washington and New York: The Neal Publishing Company, 1905. OCLC 1897724.
- Pfanz, Harry W., Gettysburg: The Second Day, University of North Carolina Press, 1987, ISBN 0-8078-1749-X.

== Reenactment group websites ==
- 15th Alabama Co. B. 15th Alabama historical reenactment group based in Ocala, Florida.
- 15th Alabama Company G. 15th Alabama historical reenactment group based in Bellingham, Washington.
- Alabama Volunteer Brigade. 15th Alabama historical reenactment group based in Holly Hill, Florida.
- "Maine Rebels". mainerebels.org. Archived from the original on September 23, 2013. 15th Alabama historical reenactment group based in Farmington, Maine.
