= Main Line (Atlantic Coast Line Railroad) =

Historic railroad in the Southeast

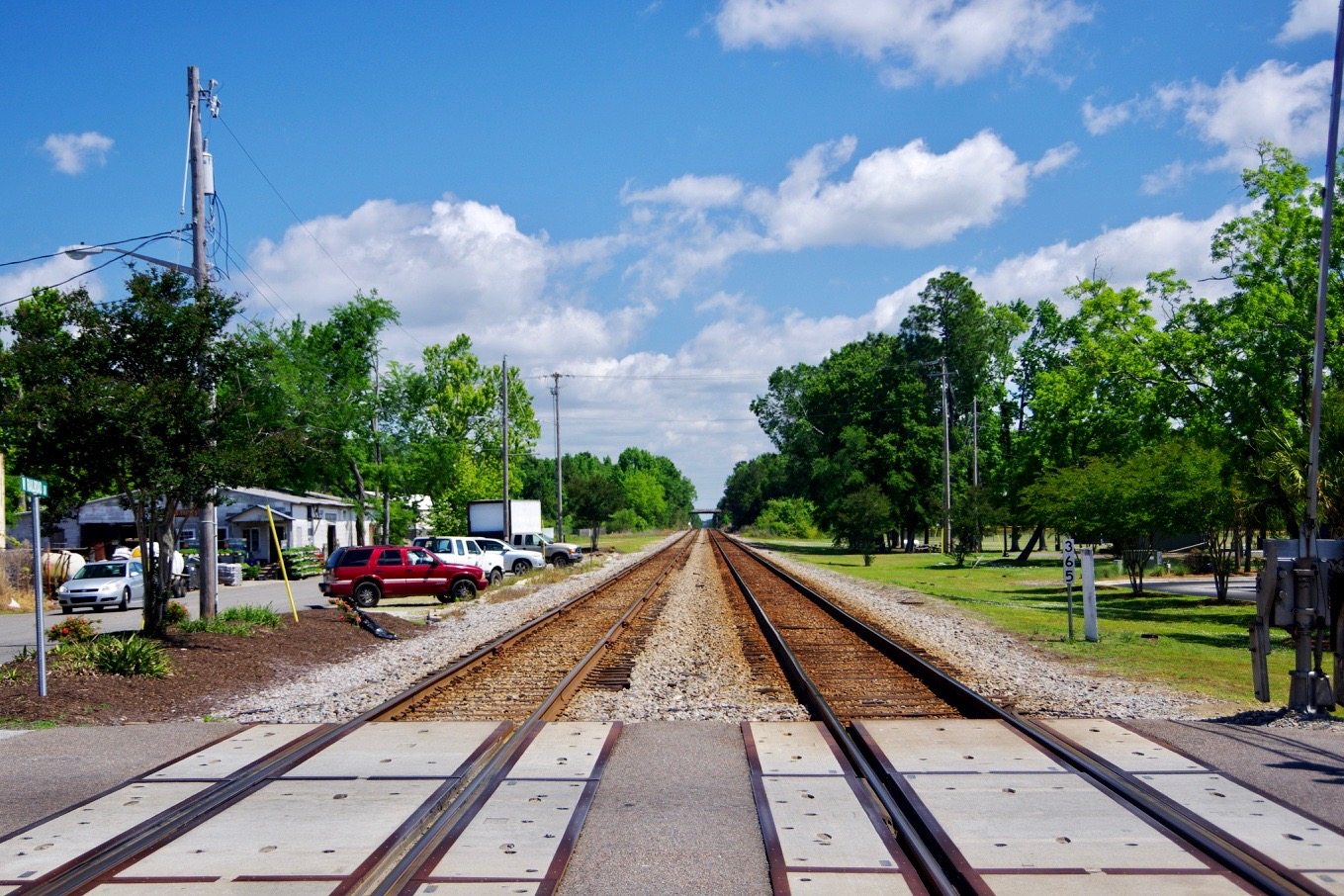
- Main Line near Moncks Corner, South Carolina in 2018

Overview
- Other name: A Line
- Status: Operating
- Owner: Atlantic Coast Line Railroad (1900-1967); Seaboard Coast Line Railroad (1967-1986); CSX Transportation (1986-present)
- Termini: Richmond, Virginia; Port Tampa, Florida

Technical
- Line length: 890.1 mi (1,432.5 km)
- Track gauge: 1,435 mm (4 ft 8 1/2 in) standard gauge
- Electrification: No
- Signalling: Centralized traffic control
Route map
Interactive Map of Atlantic Coast Line Railroad's Main Line shown in red. Former alignments shown in dark red. (Click to enlarge)

The Atlantic Coast Line Railroad's Main Line, was the backbone of the Atlantic Coast Line Railroad's network in the southeastern United States. The main line runs from Richmond, Virginia to Port Tampa just southwest of Tampa, Florida, a distance of nearly 900 miles. With the exception of a short 61-mile segment in Greater Orlando (which is now state-owned), the entire line is still owned by Atlantic Coast Line successor, CSX Transportation.

== Route description ==
The historic Atlantic Coast Line Railroad main line begins in Richmond, Virginia. From Richmond, it proceeds south through Petersburg and enters North Carolina near Weldon. It continues south through North Carolina, passing through Rocky Mount, Wilson, Selma, and Fayetteville before entering South Carolina near Hamer.

In South Carolina, it continues south another 23 miles to Pee Dee, where it turns west to Florence. In Florence, it turns south again heading directly to Charleston. On the north side of Charleston, the lines turns west and crosses the Ashley River and continues to Yemassee, where it turns south towards Savannah, Georgia.

Beyond Savannah, the line heads southwest through rural southeastern Georgia, passing through Jesup and Folkston. It enters Florida at the St. Mary's River just south of Folkston. In Florida, it heads south to Jacksonville, Sanford, and Orlando. Beyond Orlando, it turns southwest through Kissimmee, Lakeland, and Plant City to Tampa. It terminates at just southwest of Tampa in the neighborhood of Port Tampa, the location of Tampa's first deepwater port.

== History ==
=== Creation ===
By the time the Atlantic Coast Line Railroad (ACL) was officially created, track that would make up its main line had already been built by the company's predecessors. The main line was built in the late 1800s by the following companies:

| Railroad | From | To | Notes |
|---|---|---|---|
| Richmond and Petersburg Railroad | Richmond, Virginia | Petersburg, Virginia | |
| Petersburg Railroad | Petersburg | Weldon, North Carolina | |
| Wilmington and Weldon Railroad | Weldon | Wilson, North Carolina | |
| Fayetteville Cutoff | Wilson | Pee Dee, South Carolina | |
| Wilmington and Manchester Railroad | Pee Dee | Florence, South Carolina | |
| Northeastern Railroad | Florence | Charleston, South Carolina | |
| Ashley River Railroad | Charleston | Johns Island, South Carolina | Part of the Plant System |
| Charleston and Savannah Railway | Johns Island | Savannah, Georgia | Part of the Plant System |
| Atlantic and Gulf Railroad | Savannah | Jesup, Georgia | Part of the Plant System |
| Folkston Cutoff | Jesup | Folkston, Georgia | Part of the Plant System |
| Waycross and Florida Railroad | Folkston | Georgia/Florida state line | Part of the Plant System |
| East Florida Railway | Georgia/Florida state line | Jacksonville, Florida | Part of the Plant System |
| Jacksonville, Tampa and Key West Railway | Jacksonville | Sanford, Florida | Part of the Plant System |
| South Florida Railroad | Sanford | Port Tampa, Florida | Part of the Plant System |

The process to combine these individual railroads into a unified system began around 1898. By 1900, the system north of Charleston was officially merged into the Atlantic Coast Line Railroad Company. In 1902, the Atlantic Coast Line acquired the Plant System, which expanded the network into Georgia and Florida and nearly doubled the size of the network.

=== Passenger service ===
The line carried many of the Atlantic Coast Line's passenger and freight trains though the years. Many of the company's passenger trains on the main line were from the northeast to Florida, which included:

- Champion (New York - Tampa/St. Petersburg, and New York - Miami)
- Everglades (New York – Jacksonville)
- Florida Special (New York – Miami/St. Petersburg)
- Gulf Coast Special (New York – Tampa/Fort Myers/St. Petersburg)
- Havana Special (New York – Key West, via the Florida East Coast Railway prior to the 1935 Labor Day hurricane.)
- Miamian (Washington – Miami)
- Vacationer (New York – Miami)

=== Improvements and realignments ===
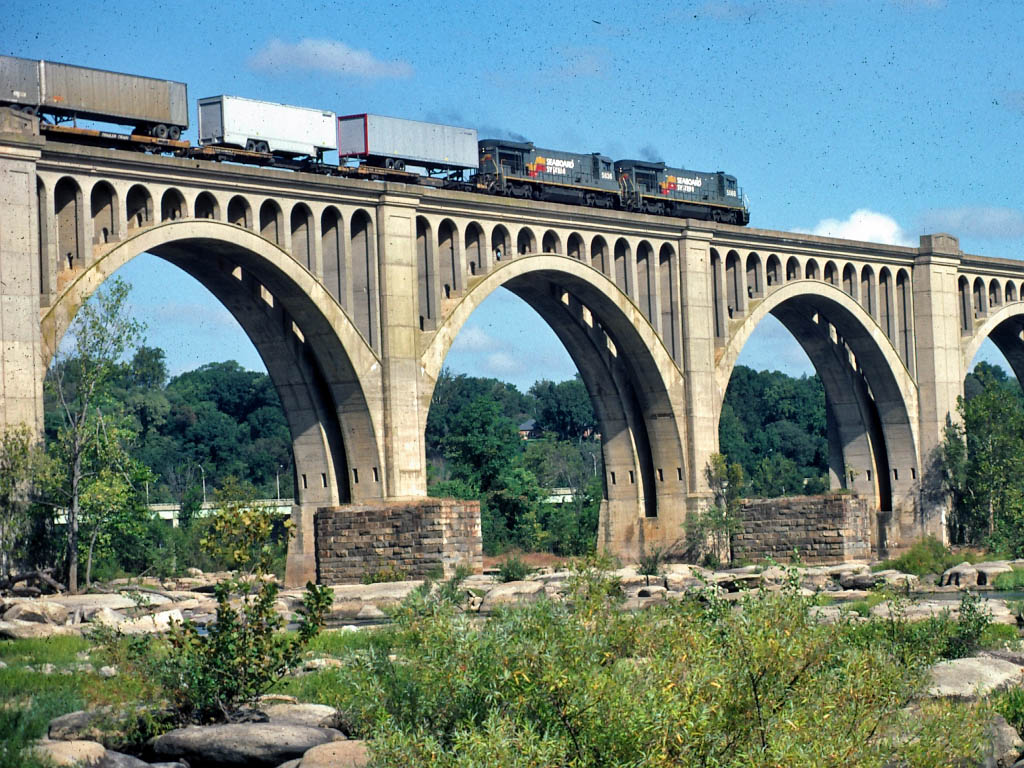
Arch bridge over the James River at the north end of the main line near Richmond (as seen in 1985)

By the time the Atlantic Coast Line Railroad was established, the main line began at Byrd Street Station in Downtown Richmond, which was still in use by passenger trains. At the time, track crossed the James River across Brown's Island near Downtown Richmond and it connected to the Richmond, Fredericksburg and Potomac Railroad (RF&P) through downtown streets. Atlantic Coast Line predecessor, the Richmond and Petersburg Railroad (R&P), built the current James River crossing (initially consisting of a single-track truss bridge) jointly with the RF&P in 1887 as a freight bypass (known as the Belt Line) to the busy downtown. By 1919, Broad Street Station was opened in Richmond as a union depot for the Atlantic Coast Line, the RF&P, and the Norfolk and Western Railway. The opening of Broad Street Station would essentially cause the Belt Line to become the main line. The Atlantic Coast Line and the RF&P jointly built the current double-track arch bridge over the James River to accommodate the additional passenger traffic. Track south of the bridge was also realigned to connect with the original main line at what is now FA Junction (about 2 miles south of the original junction at Cofer Road). The original main line to downtown Richmond partially remains today as the Clopton Lead and remnants of the original Richmond and Petersburg Railroad Bridge stil remain as well. While the middle of the James River Bridge became the beginning of the realigned main line, Mile Post 0 was placed a short distance south of the bridge to keep the mile numbering consistent with the original line.

Due to increasing traffic and the Florida land boom of the 1920s, the ACL began work to double track a vast majority of the main line between Richmond and Jacksonville in 1922. The double track was complete in 1925, two years ahead of schedule. Automatic block signals were installed at the same time. Segments of the main line in the Orlando and Tampa areas were also expanded to double track in 1926.

The main line also ran through downtown Petersburg, Virginia in the company's early years, which served Petersburg Union Station. Atlantic Coast Line predecessors also built a belt line to the west allowing freight trains to bypass central Petersburg. In 1942, the Atlantic Coast Line built a new Petersburg passenger depot on the belt line in Ettrick and discontinued service to the Union Station. By 1955, the belt line became the main line when the original route through Petersburg was abandoned.

In Sanford, Florida, the main line originally ran through the city's downtown with a passenger depot (built in 1913) located at the current site of Coastline Park. Sometime in the 1940s, track bypassing downtown Sanford to the west was built. In 1953, the Atlantic Coast Line built a new Sanford passenger depot on the bypass at West 8th Street just west of Persimmon Avenue. After the new depot opened, the bypass became the main line and part of the original route through Sanford was abandoned. Despite the realignment, the mile post numbers still reflect the original route, causing the mileposts to jump from 768 to 771 south of Sanford.

=== Mergers ===
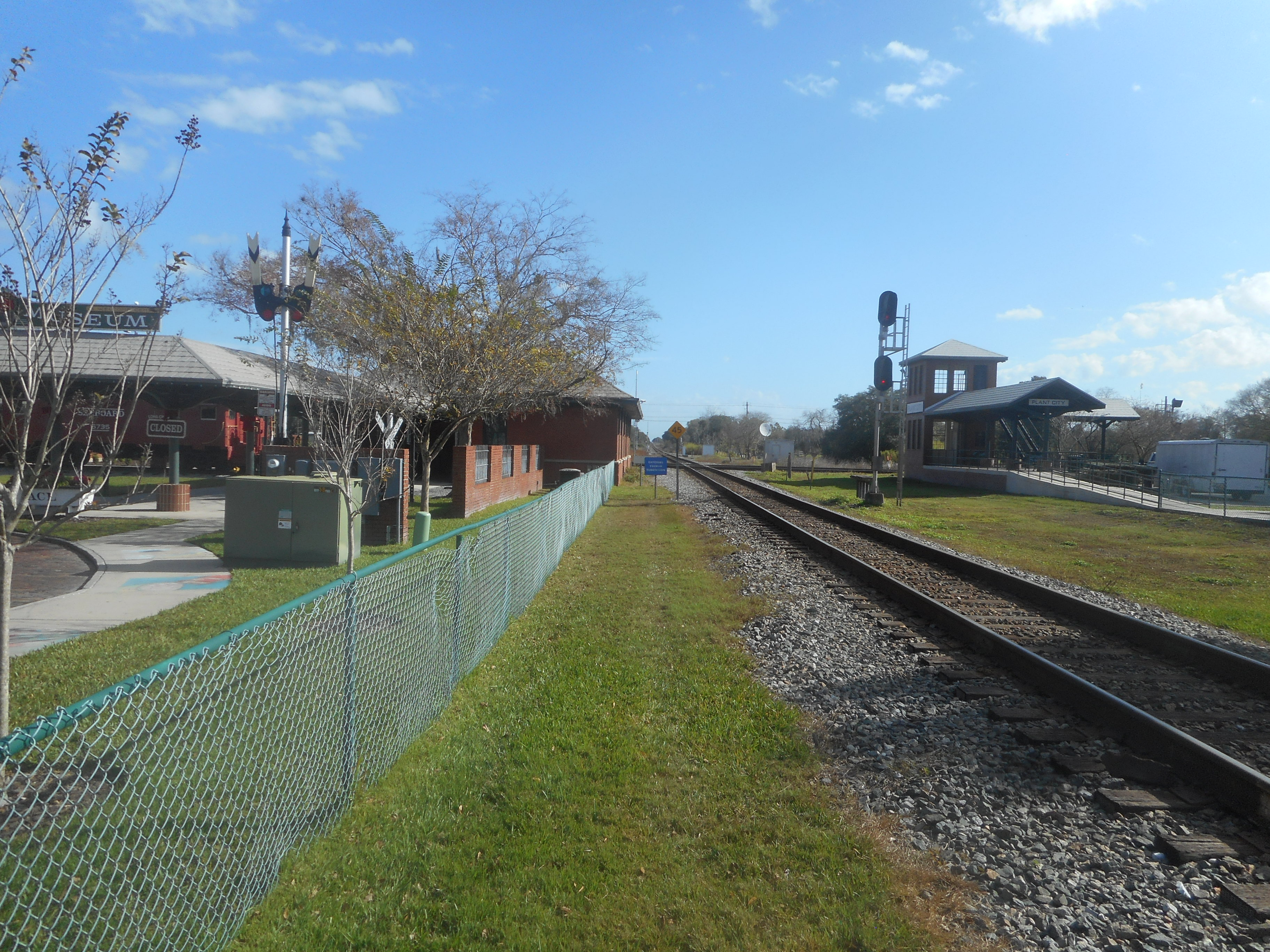
ACL main line in Plant City, Florida where it crossed the SAL's main line.

In 1967, the Atlantic Coast Line merged with their long-time rival, the Seaboard Air Line Railroad (SAL). The SAL also had a main line running from Richmond, Virginia to Tampa, Florida that was roughly parallel to the ACL's main line. The two main lines crossed each other in Chester, Petersburg, Savannah, Jacksonville, and Plant City. After the merger was complete, the company was named the Seaboard Coast Line Railroad (SCL), who largely retained both main lines in the combined network. To differentiate the two main lines, the Seaboard Coast Line designated the ACL's main line as the "A Line" and the SAL's main line as the "S Line". The letter A was added as a prefix to the mileposts on the A Line (A was also added to the beginning of the pre-existing letter prefixes on the ACL's branch lines).

In later years, much of the double-tracked segments of the A Line would be restored to single track with passing sidings. The signal system was also upgraded to centralized traffic control at the same time.

In 1980, the Seaboard Coast Line's parent company merged with the Chessie System, creating the CSX Corporation. The CSX Corporation initially operated the Chessie and Seaboard Systems separately until 1986, when they were merged into CSX Transportation.

== Current operations ==
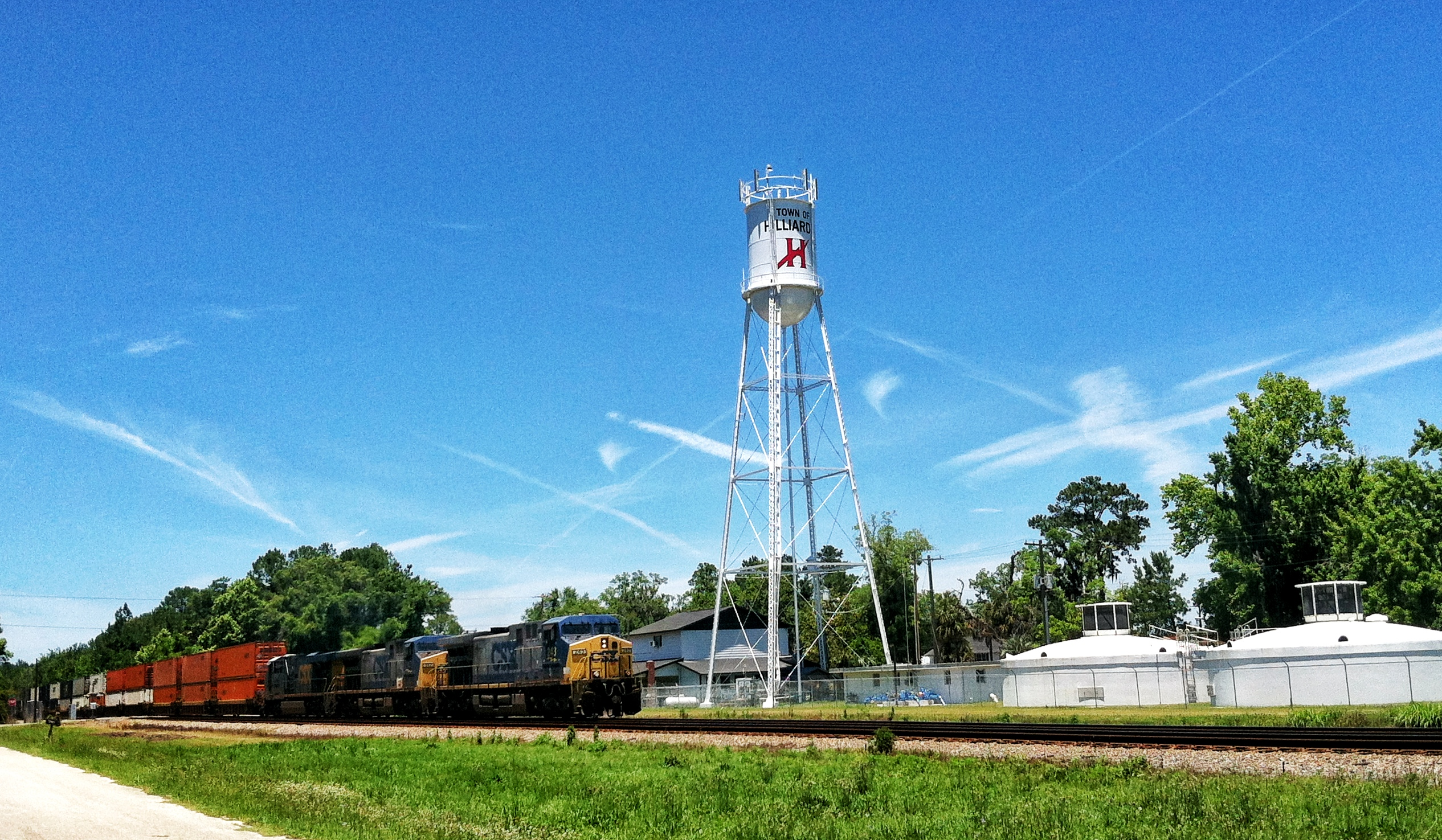
CSX train passing through Hilliard, Florida on the former ACL main line

The full line from Richmond to Port Tampa is still in service. In 2011, CSX sold a 61-mile segment from Deland, Florida to Poinciana, Florida in the Greater Orlando area to the Florida Department of Transportation, who now operates the SunRail commuter rail service on that segment. Other than that, CSX still owns and operates the rest of the line. Many CSX freight trains and Amtrak trains runs the line daily.

From north to south, the A Line is designated by CSX as the North End Subdivision, South End Subdivision, Charleston Subdivision, Savannah Subdivision, Nahunta Subdivision, Jacksonville Terminal Subdivision, Sanford Subdivision, Carters Subdivision, Lakeland Subdivision, and the Tampa Terminal Subdivision.

== Historic stations ==
| State | Milepost | City/Location | Station | Image | Connections and notes |
|---|---|---|---|---|---|
| VA | | Richmond | Broad Street Station | | opened in 1917 replacing Byrd Street Station located on Richmond, Fredericksburg and Potomac Railroad |
| VA | ARN 3.6 | Richmond | AY Interlocking | | junction with Richmond, Fredericksburg and Potomac Railroad |
| VA | ARN 0.0; A 0.0 | Richmond | Bridge over James River | | |
| VA | A 1.0 | Richmond | Meadow | | |
| VA | A 5.5 | Richmond | FA Junction | | |
| VA | A 10.7 | Centralia | Centralia | | |
| VA | A 12.8 | Chester | Chester | | junction with Seaboard Air Line Railroad Main Line |
| VA | A 19.4 | | Dunlop | | |
| VA | A 22.0 | Petersburg | Petersburg Union Station | | replaced original station in 1910 and replaced by the current station in 1955 (which is located on a bypass track around Petersburg built in the 1930s) junction with Southside Railroad (N&W) |
| VA | A 27.1 | Petersburg | Collier Yard | | |
| VA | A 31.4 | | Reams | | |
| VA | A 36.0 | Carson | Carson | | |
| VA | A 43.2 | Stony Creek | Stony Creek | | |
| VA | A 53.2 | Jarratt | Jarratt | | junction with Virginian Railway (N&W) |
| VA | A 62.8 | Emporia | Emporia | | originally Hicksford junction with Atlantic and Danville Railway |
| VA | A 68.1 | Skippers | Trego | | |
| NC | A 74.4 | Pleasant Hill | Pleasant Hill | | |
| NC | A 80.1 | Garysburg | Garysburg | | |
| NC | A 82.6 | Weldon | Weldon | | junction with Seaboard Air Line Railroad Portsmouth Subdivision |
| NC | A 89.9 | Halifax | Halifax | | |
| NC | A 91.7 | | Pender | | junction with Kinston Branch |
| NC | A 92.6 | | Ruggles | | |
| NC | A 100.9 | Enfield | Enfield | | |
| NC | A 107.0 | Whitakers | Whitakers | | |
| NC | A 111.2 | Battleboro | Battleboro | | |
| NC | A 114.7 | | Schrader | | |
| NC | A 119.6 | Rocky Mount | Rocky Mount | | Amtrak Carolinian, Palmetto, Silver Meteor, and Silver Star station rebuilt in 1911, 1916, and in the 1960s junction with Nashville Branch |
| NC | A 121.2 | Rocky Mount | South Rocky Mount | | junction with Norfolk—Rocky Mount Line |
| NC | A 125.6 | Sharpsburg | Sharpsburg | | |
| NC | A 128.6 | | Joyner | | |
| NC | A 129.4 | Elm City | Elm City | | |
| NC | A 135.7 | Wilson | Wilson | | Amtrak Carolinian, Palmetto rebuilt in 1924 junction with Norfolk Southern Railway (SOU) |
| NC | A 138.9 | | Contentnea | | junction with Wilmington Line |
| NC | A 144.2 | Lucama | Lucama | | |
| NC | A 151.2 | Kenly | Kenly | | named for ACL president John R. Kenly |
| NC | A 156.3 | Micro | Micro | | |
| NC | A 161.2 | Selma | Selma Union Depot | | Amtrak Carolinian, Palmetto replaced original station in 1924 junction with the North Carolina Railroad (SOU) |
| NC | A 164.8 | Smithfield | Smithfield | | junction with Midland Branch |
| NC | A 171.5 | Four Oaks | Four Oaks | | |
| NC | A 180.0 | Benson | Benson | | |
| NC | A 186.0 | Dunn | Dunn | | |
| NC | A 194.6 | Godwin | Godwin | | |
| NC | A 198.5 | Wade | Wade | | |
| NC | A 204.1 | | Beard | | |
| NC | A 209.7 | Fayetteville | Fayetteville | | Amtrak Silver Meteor, Palmetto current station built in 1911 junction with: Sanford Branch; Raleigh and Southport Railroad (NS) |
| NC | A 216.1 | Hope Mills | Hope Mills | | junction with Aberdeen and Rockfish Railroad |
| NC | A 222.9 | Parkton | Parkton | | junction with Parkton—Sumter Line |
| NC | A 227.7 | Rex | Rex | | |
| NC | A 230.2 | Rennert | Rennert | | |
| NC | A 236.5 | | Buie | | |
| NC | A 241.3 | Pembroke | Pembroke | | junction with Seaboard Air Line Railroad Wilmington Subdivision |
| NC | A 246.3 | Elrod | Elrod | | junction with Myrtle Beach Branch |
| NC | A 252.8 | Rowland | Rowland | | |
| SC | A 257.1 | Hamer | Hamer | | |
| SC | A 262.2 | Dillon | Dillon | | junction with Seaboard Air Line Railroad Andrews Subdivision |
| SC | A 269.1 | Latta | Latta | | |
| SC | A 273.4 | Sellers | Sellers | | |
| SC | A 280.1 | | Pee Dee | | junction with Wilmington—Pee Dee Line |
| SC | A 283.1 | | Winona | | |
| SC | A 286.3 | Mars Bluff | Mars Bluff | | |
| SC | A 292.7 | Florence | Florence | | Amtrak Silver Meteor, Palmetto station rebuilt in 1910 junction with: Florence—Robbins Line; Wadesboro—Florence Line; Seaboard Air Line Railroad Hartsville Subdivision |
| SC | A 300.0 | | Java | | |
| SC | A 303.3 | Effingham | Effingham | | |
| SC | A 309.4 | Coward | Coward | | |
| SC | A 313.7 | Scranton | Scranton | | |
| SC | A 316.1 | Lake City | Lake City | | |
| SC | A 322.2 | Cades | Cades | | |
| SC | A 331.1 | Kingstree | Kingstree | | Amtrak Silver Meteor, Palmetto station rebuilt in 1909 |
| SC | A 336.5 | Salters | Salters | | |
| SC | A 341.1 | Lane | Lane | | also listed as Lanes on employee timetables junction with Sumter–Lanes Line |
| SC | A 344.9 | | Santee Bluff | | |
| SC | A 349.6 | St. Stephen | St. Stephen | | |
| SC | A 356.7 | Bonneau | Bonneau | | |
| SC | A 365.0 | Moncks Corner | Moncks Corner | | |
| SC | A 376.1 | Mount Holly | Mount Holly | | |
| SC | A 383.3 | Hanahan | Hanahan | | |
| SC | A 387.7 | North Charleston | Charleston | | Amtrak Silver Meteor, Palmetto replaced Charleston Union Station in 1957 rebuilt as the Charleston Intermodal Center in 2018 |
| SC | A 388.4 | North Charleston | Ashley Junction | | junction with South Carolina Railroad (SOU) |
| SC | ACN 394.6 | Charleston | Charleston Union Station | | located on a spur at East Bay Street & Columbus Street station building burned down in 1947 and platform closed in 1957 |
| SC | A 389.3 | | Bennett | | |
| SC | A 398.7 | Johns Island | Johns Island | | junction with Croghans Branch |
| SC | A 406.7 | Ravenel | Ravenel | | junction with Yonges Island Branch |
| SC | A 415.8 | Parkers Ferry | Parkers Ferry | | |
| SC | A 419.2 | Jacksonboro | Jacksonboro | | |
| SC | A 428.7 | Green Pond | Green Pond | | junction with Walterboro Branch |
| SC | A 432.3 | | White Hall | | |
| SC | A 443.0 | Yemassee | Yemassee | | Amtrak Silver Meteor, Palmetto parts of the station rebuilt in 1955 junction with Charleston and Western Carolina Railway (ACL) |
| SC | A 449.6 | | Gilmania | | |
| SC | A 459.3 | Ridgeland | Ridgeland | | |
| SC | A 473.9 | Hardeeville | Hardeeville | | |
| SC | A 478.5 | | Sand Island | | |
| GA | A 490.4 | Savannah | Central Junction | | junction with: Seaboard Air Line Railroad Main Line & Savannah Subdivision; Savannah and Atlantic Railroad (CoG) |
| GA | A 490.9 | Savannah | Savannah Union Station | | accessed via a spur track |
| GA | A 504.4 | | Burroughs | | junction with Seaboard Air Line Railroad Main Line |
| GA | A 508.6 | Richmond Hill | Richmond Hill | | originally Ways |
| GA | A 514.4 | | Fleming | | |
| GA | A 522.8 | | McIntosh | | junction with Savannah, Hinesville and Western Railway |
| GA | A 528.8 | Walthourville | Walthourville | | |
| GA | A 537.6 | Ludowici | Ludowici | | originally Johnston Station junction with Georgia Coast and Piedmont Railroad |
| GA | A 543.7 | | Doctortown | | |
| GA | A 548.2 | Jesup | Jesup | | Amtrak Silver Meteor junction with: Jesup—Waycross Line; Macon and Brunswick Railroad (SOU) |
| GA | A 553.0 | | Leake | | |
| GA | A 558.3 | | Broadhurst | | |
| GA | A 563.5 | | O'Neal | | |
| GA | A 567.7 | Hortense | Hortense | | Junction with Brunswick and Birmingham Railroad (AB&A/ACL) |
| GA | A 573.2 | | Raybon | | |
| GA | A 576.9 | Nahunta | Nahunta | | junction with Waycross–Brunswick Line |
| GA | A 582.0 | | Shea | | |
| GA | A 588.5 | | Winokur | | |
| GA | A 592.0 | | Newell | | |
| GA | A 602.5 | Folkston | Folkston | | junction with Waycross—Folkston Line |
| FL | A 608.5 | Boulogne | Boulogne | | |
| FL | A 614.5 | Hilliard | Hilliard | | |
| FL | A 620.1 | Dyal | Dyal | | |
| FL | A 624.5 | Callahan | Callahan | | former depot relocated to site of the Seaboard Air Line Railroad; ROW; junction with SAL Gross Subdivision |
| FL | A 635.2 | | Dinsmore | | |
| FL | A 640.0 | Jacksonville | Grand Crossing | | junction with Wilcox Line |
| FL | A 640.3 | Jacksonville | Moncrief Yard | | |
| FL | A 643.7 | Jacksonville | Jacksonville Union Terminal | | junction with: Florida East Coast Railway Main Line; Seaboard Air Line Railroad Main Line; Atlantic, Valdosta and Western Railway (GS&F/SOU) |
| FL | A 649.9 | | McGirts | | |
| FL | A 654.0 | Yukon | Yukon | | originally Black Point |
| FL | A 658.6 | Orange Park | Orange Park | | |
| FL | A 665.1 | Doctor's Inlet | Doctor's Inlet | | |
| FL | A 668.5 | | Russell | | originally Fleming |
| FL | A 672.6 | Green Cove Springs | Green Cove Springs | | |
| FL | A 676.1 | | Walkill | | |
| FL | A 682.2 | | West Tocoi | | |
| FL | A 690.8 | Bostwick | Bostwick | | |
| FL | A 696.7 | | Pecan | | |
| FL | A 698.0 | Palatka | Palatka Union Station | | Amtrak Silver Meteor and Silver Star junction with: Atlantic Coast Line Railroad Palatka Branch; Florida East Coast Railway Palatka Branch; Georgia Southern and Florida Railroad (SOU); Ocklawaha Valley Railroad |
| FL | A 700.4 | | Lundy | | |
| FL | A 708.1 | Satsuma | Satsuma | | |
| FL | A 712.2 | Pomona Park | Pomona Park | | originally Pomona |
| FL | A 716.7 | Huntington | Huntington | | |
| FL | A 719.3 | Crescent City | Crescent City | | |
| FL | A 722.2 | | Longs | | |
| FL | A 726.6 | Seville | Seville | | |
| FL | A 732.0 | Pierson | Pierson | | |
| FL | A 737.9 | Barberville | Barberville | | |
| FL | A 743.1 | DeLeon Springs | DeLeon Springs | | originally Spring Garden |
| FL | A 746.3 | Glenwood | Glenwood | | |
| FL | A 750.0 | West DeLand | DeLand | | Amtrak Silver Meteor and Silver Star originally DeLand Junction junction with DeLand and St. Johns River Railroad (ACL) |
| FL | A 754.8 | Orange City | Orange City | | junction with Florida East Coast Railway Orange City Branch |
| FL | A 760.8 | DeBary | Benson Junction | | junction with Florida East Coast Railway Enterprise Branch |
| FL | A 764.5 | Sanford | Rands | | Currently the location of the Rand Yard |
| FL | A 766.3 | Sanford | Sanford | | Amtrak Auto Train junction with: Leesburg Branch; Lake Charm Branch |
| FL | A 771.3 | Lake Mary | Lake Mary | | |
| FL | A 778.4 | Longwood | Longwood | | |
| FL | A 781.3 | Altamonte Springs | Altamonte Springs | | Originally Snowville |
| FL | A 783.0 | Maitland | Maitland | | |
| FL | A 785.6 | Winter Park | Winter Park | | Amtrak Silver Meteor, Silver Star and Sunset Limited rebuilt in 1912 and 1962 |
| FL | A 791.1 | Orlando | Church Street Station | | closed in 1926, reopened as SunRail station in 2014 junction with Seaboard Air Line Railroad Orlando Subdivision |
| FL | A 790.4 | Orlando | Orlando | | Amtrak Silver Meteor, Silver Star and Sunset Limited replaced Church Street Station in 1926 |
| FL | A 793.1 | Pine Castle | Pine Castle | | |
| FL | A 798.4 | Taft | Taft | | originally Big Cypress |
| FL | A 808.0 | Kissimmee | Kissimmee | | Amtrak Silver Meteor and Silver Star junction with: Narcoosee Branch; Florida Midland Branch |
| FL | A 812.0 | Campbell | Campbell | | |
| FL | A 819.1 | Loughman | Loughman | | originally Lake Locke |
| FL | A 824.8 | Davenport | Davenport | | |
| FL | A 829.4 | Haines City | Haines City | | junction with Haines City Branch |
| FL | A 835.6 | Lake Alfred | Lake Alfred | | originally Bartow Junction junction with Bartow Branch |
| FL | A 839.7 | Auburndale | Auburndale | | junction with Seaboard Air Line Railroad Miami Subdivision |
| FL | A 844.7 | Fussels Corner | Carters | | |
| FL | A 851.8 | Lakeland | Lakeland | | Amtrak Silver Star rebuilt in 1910 and 1998 junction with: High Springs—Lakeland Line; Lakeland—Fort Myers Line |
| FL | A 855.4 | Winston | Winston | | junction with Bone Valley Branch |
| FL | A 858.4 | | Youmans | | |
| FL | A 861.1 | Plant City | Plant City Union Depot | | replaced original station in 1909 junction with Seaboard Air Line Railroad Main Line |
| FL | A 867.8 | Dover | Dover | | originally known as Cork |
| FL | A 870.9 | Seffner | Seffner | | |
| FL | A 873.5 | Mango | Mango | | |
| FL | A 878.8 | Tampa | Uceta | | junction with Sarasota Line |
| FL | A 879.6 | Tampa | Thonotosassa Junction | | junction with Vitis—Tampa Line |
| FL | A 881.7 | Tampa | Tampa Union Station | | Amtrak Silver Star replaced original station in 1912 junction with Seaboard Air Line Railroad |
| FL | A 890.1 | Tampa | Port Tampa | | |
