= Jesup Subdivision =

Railway line in Georgia, USA

The Jesup Subdivision is a railroad line owned and operated by CSX Transportation in Georgia. The line runs from Jesup, Georgia, to Folkston, Georgia, for a length of 72.7 miles (117.0 km). It notably passes through Waycross, Georgia, a major CSX freight terminal, and CSX operates numerous freight trains over the line. The Jesup Subdivision was once a major route for the Atlantic Coast Line Railroad, one of CSX's predecessors.

== Route Description ==
The Jesup Subdivision begins in its namesake city of Jesup, Georgia, where it branches off of CSX's Nahunta Subdivision (a segment of CSX's A Line). From Jesup, it runs southwest in a nearly straight line through Screven, Offerman and Blackshear to Waycross.

Waycross is a major junction and freight terminal for CSX. After entering Waycross, the Jesup Subdivision connects to the Brunswick Subdivision just east of the town's main junction. From the main junction, the Fitzgerald Subdivision runs north and the Thomasville Subdivision runs west. Just west of the junction along the Thomasville Subdivision is Rice Yard, which is the largest railroad yard in the southeast and the second-largest yard in the CSX system. CSX's largest locomotive maintenance and inspection facility is located within the yard as well. Between 1,700 and 2,900 cars rail cars pass through Rice Yard for classification or inspection a day.

From the junction, the Jesup Subdivision continues southeast along the eastern edge of the Okefenokee Swamp to Folkston, where it reconnects with the Nahunta Subdivision.

== History ==
=== Early years ===
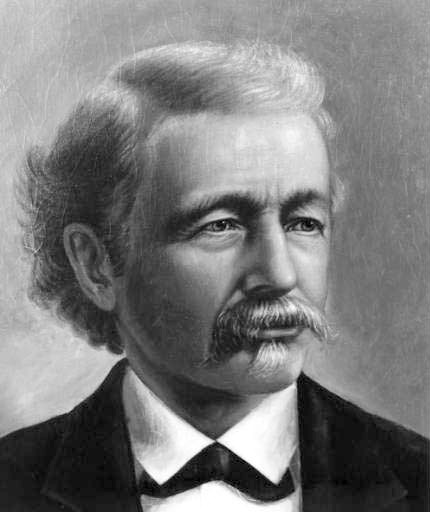
Henry B. Plant, whose railroad system owned and built much of the track that is now the Jesup Subdivision

The Jesup Subdivision was built incrementally in the late 1800s. From Jesup to Waycross, it was originally a segment of the Atlantic and Gulf Railroad and was built in 1859 just before the start of the American Civil War. One of the officers of the Atlantic and Gulf Railroad was Dr. James Proctor Screven, for whom the city of Screven, Georgia, along the line is named.

The Atlantic and Gulf Railroad went bankrupt in 1877 and was bought in 1879 by Henry B. Plant and became incorporated into his Plant System. It would be the main line of Plant's Savannah, Florida and Western Railway.

In 1880, Plant chartered the Waycross and Florida Railroad to build the line from Waycross south to Folkston, which continued to Florida. This line, informally known as the "Waycross Short Line" was completed by 1881.

The line through Waycross was the main route for trains travelling from the northeast to Florida until the construction of the Plant System's Folkston Cutoff (which is the present-day Nahunta Subdivision).

=== Atlantic Coast Line ownership ===
Jesup—Folkston (via Waycross) Line

Overview
- Other name: Jesup Subdivision
- Status: Still operating under CSX
- Owner: Atlantic Coast Line Railroad (1902–1967); Seaboard Coast Line Railroad (1967–1986); CSX Transportation (1986-present)
- Locale: Southeast Georgia

Technical
- Track gauge: 1,435 mm (4 ft 8 1/2 in) standard gauge
- Electrification: No
- Signalling: Centralized traffic control

After the death of Henry Plant in 1899, the Plant System was bought by the Atlantic Coast Line Railroad (ACL). The ACL would designate the line as their Jesup—Folkston (via Waycross) Line. Employee timetables specified that the route went through Waycross to differentiate it from the ACL's main line, which used the Folkston Cutoff and passed through both Jesup and Folkston.

By 1949, the line was a busy route for the Atlantic Coast Line. Two local passenger trains from Savannah east to Montgomery, Alabama, ran the line daily between Jesup and Waycross. From Waycross to Folkston, passenger trains from the Midwest to Florida ran the line including the City of Miami, Dixie Flyer, Dixie Flagler, Flamingo, Seminole and South Wind. Numerous local and through freight trains also ran the line daily.

=== Later years ===
The Atlantic Coast Line became the Seaboard Coast Line Railroad (SCL) in 1967 after merging with their rival, the Seaboard Air Line Railroad (SAL). The Seaboard Coast Line adopted the Seaboard Air Line's method of naming their lines as subdivisions. As a result, the line was renamed by the company to the Jesup Subdivision as it is today. The South Wind continued to operate after the merger, and the Champion also ran the line from Jesup to Folkston instead of the main line once a day.

The Seaboard Coast Line's passenger services were taken over by Amtrak in May 1971. Amtrak continued to operate the South Wind until November 14, 1971, when Amtrak renamed the train the Floridian and reduced it to a two-night schedule. Passenger service was ended on the line when Amtrak discontinued the Floridian in 1979 as part of the Federal budget cuts that year that impacted several major Amtrak routes. This ended passenger service on the Jesup Subdivision.

In 1980, the Seaboard Coast Line's parent company merged with the Chessie System, creating the CSX Corporation. The CSX Corporation initially operated the Chessie and Seaboard Systems separately until 1986, when they were merged into CSX Transportation.

== Historic Atlantic Coast Line stations ==
Jesup to Folkston
Milepost	City/Location	Station	Image	Connections and notes
AN 548.2	Jesup	Jesup		Amtrak Silver Meteor junction with: Atlantic Coast Line Railroad Main Line; Macon and Brunswick Railroad (SOU)
AN 553.1		Slover		
AN 559.5	Screven	Screven		
AN 567.2	Offerman	Offerman		junction with Brunswick and Birmingham Railway (AB&C/ACL)
AN 569.6		Patterson		
AN 574.0		Owen		
AN 577.6	Blackshear	Blackshear		
AN 580.9		Homestead		
AN 587.8	Waycross	Waycross		originally Malvern junction with: Waycross—Montgomery Line; Albany—Brunswick Line; Waycross Air Line Railroad (AB&C/ACL)
ANA 588.3	Waycross	South Wye		
ANA 598.4		Braganza		
ANA 605.2	Fort Mudge	Fort Mudge		
ANA 607.8	Racepond	Race Pond		
ANA 615.7	Uptonville	Uptonville		
ANA 621.1	Folkston	Folkston		junction with Atlantic Coast Line Railroad Main Line

== See also ==
- List of CSX Transportation lines
- Waycross—Montgomery Line
