= Waycross Short Line =

Historic railroad in Georgia and Florida

Overview
- Status: Still operating
- Owner: Plant System (1881-1902); Atlantic Coast Line Railroad (1902-1967); Seaboard Coast Line Railroad (1967-1986); CSX Transportation (1986-present)
- Termini: Waycross, Georgia; Jacksonville, Florida

Technical
- Line length: 74.5 mi (119.9 km)
- Track gauge: 1,435 mm (4 ft 8 1/2 in) standard gauge
- Electrification: No
- Signalling: Centralized traffic control

The Waycross Short Line was the unofficial name of a railroad line built by Henry B. Plant that ran from Waycross, Georgia to Jacksonville, Florida on the St. Johns River. The line through Georgia was chartered by Plant as the Waycross and Florida Railroad and the Florida segment was chartered as the East Florida Railway. The line crossed the Georgia/Florida border just south of Folkston, Georgia at the St. Marys River.

== History ==
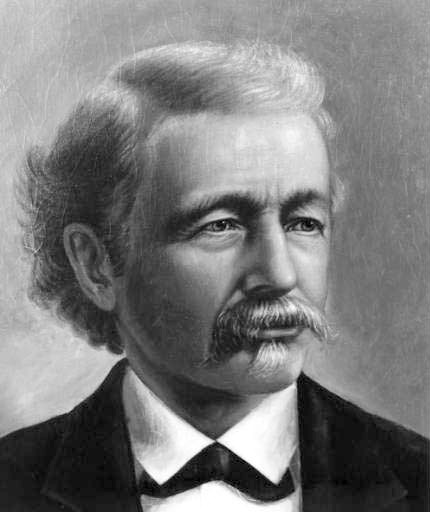
Henry B. Plant

In 1879, Henry B. Plant acquired what became the Savannah, Florida and Western Railway from its previous owner, the bankrupt Atlantic and Gulf Railroad. The Savannah, Florida and Western Railway (which became the main line of the Plant System) ran from Savannah, Georgia across southern Georgia to Bainbridge via Waycross, Valdosta, and Thomasville. The line already served Florida via a branch line from Lawton (known today as DuPont) south to Live Oak, Florida, which was the first railroad to cross the Georgia/Florida border. While that branch remained important to the Plant System, Henry Plant sought a direct connection of his network to Jacksonville, Florida on the St. Johns River, which would become a major rail junction and shipping port.

In 1880, Plant chartered the Waycross and Florida Railroad as the Georgia segment of the line. It was to run from the main line at Waycross southeast to the St. Marys River (just south of Folkston on the Georgia/Florida Border). Plant then chartered the East Florida Railway as the Florida segment of the line, which continued from the St. Marys River south to Jacksonville via Callahan. Completed in 1881, the Waycross Short Line became the second railroad to cross the Georgia/Florida border. After the line opened, travel time between Savannah, Georgia and Jacksonville was greatly reduced. In 1901, the Plant System built the Folkston Cutoff to further shorten travel between Savannah and Jacksonville.

By 1884, the line was fully integrated into the Plant System. In 1902, the entire Plant System was acquired by the Atlantic Coast Line Railroad. The Waycross Short Line from the Folkston Cutoff south to Jacksonville would become part of the Atlantic Coast Line's main line, which in its entirety would run from Richmond, Virginia to Tampa, Florida. The Atlantic Coast Line would fully expand its main line north of Jacksonville to double track in 1925 along with the installation of automatic block signaling.

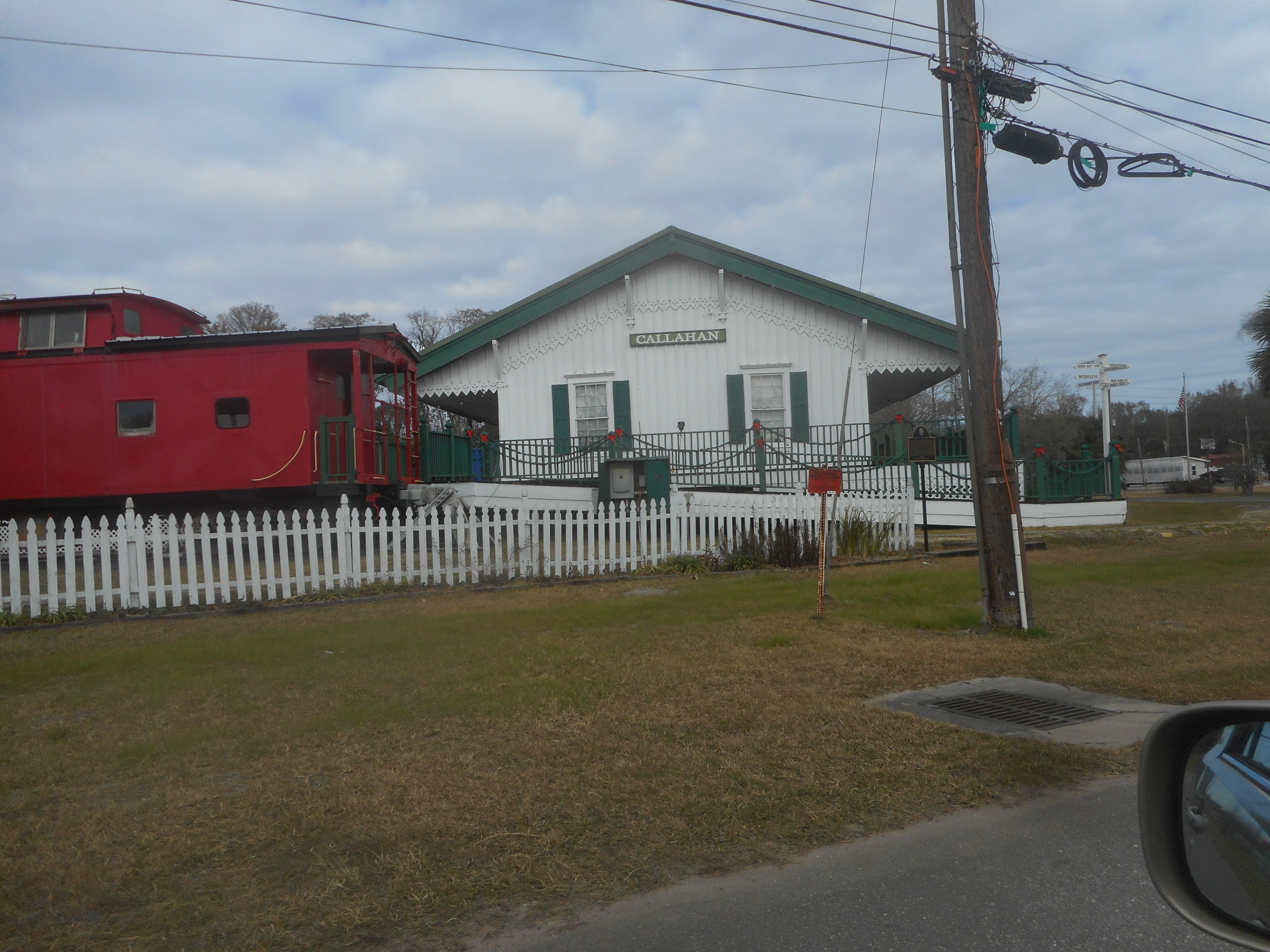
The former Callahan ACL Depot moved to the SAL Right-of-Way and converted into the West Nassau Museum of History.

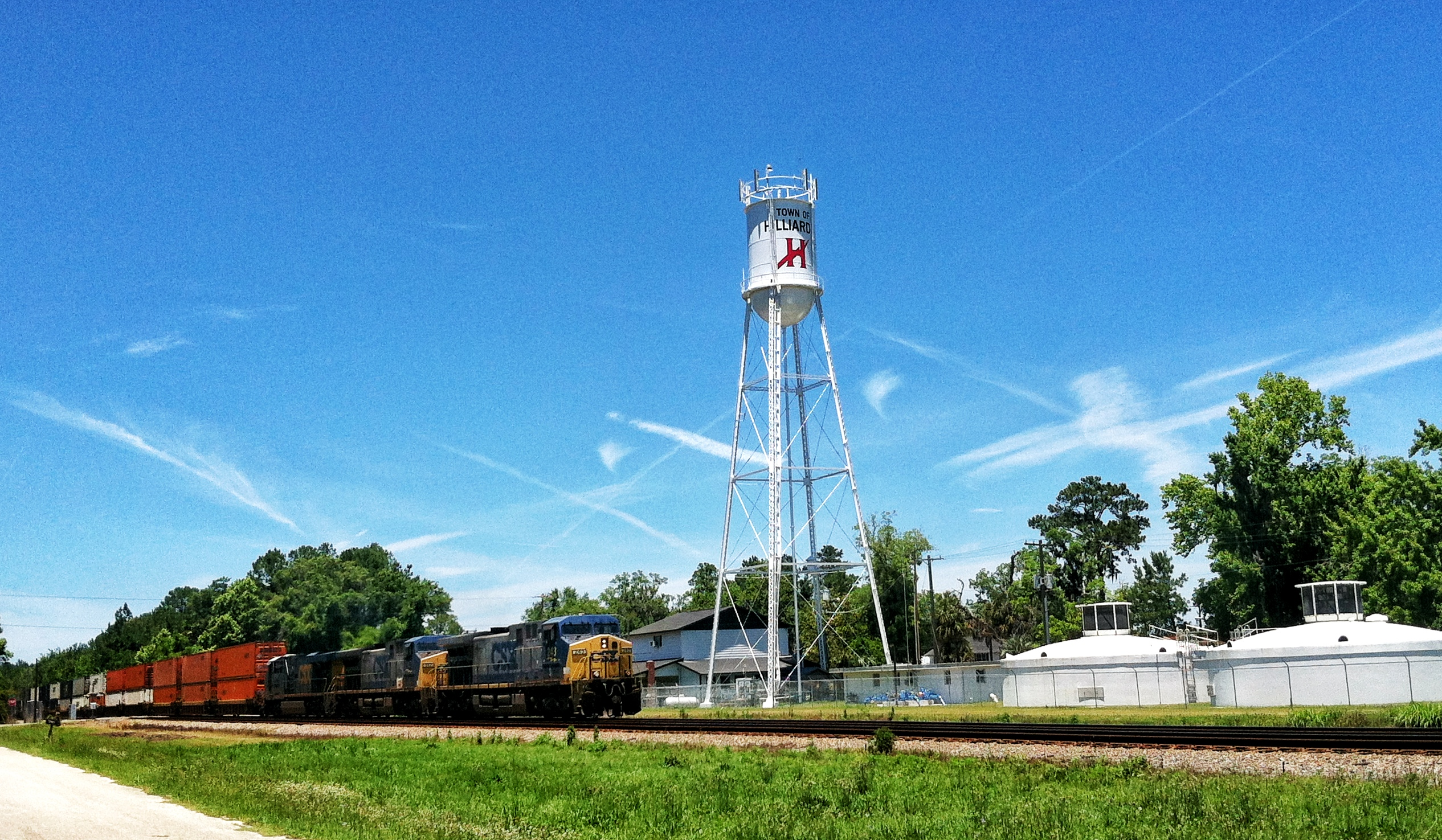
CSX train passing through Hilliard, Florida on the former Waycross Short Line

The Atlantic Coast Line became the Seaboard Coast Line Railroad in 1967 after merging with their former rival, the Seaboard Air Line Railroad. In 1980, the Seaboard Coast Line's parent company merged with the Chessie System, creating the CSX Corporation. The CSX Corporation initially operated the Chessie and Seaboard Systems separately until 1986, when they were merged into CSX Transportation.

== Current conditions ==
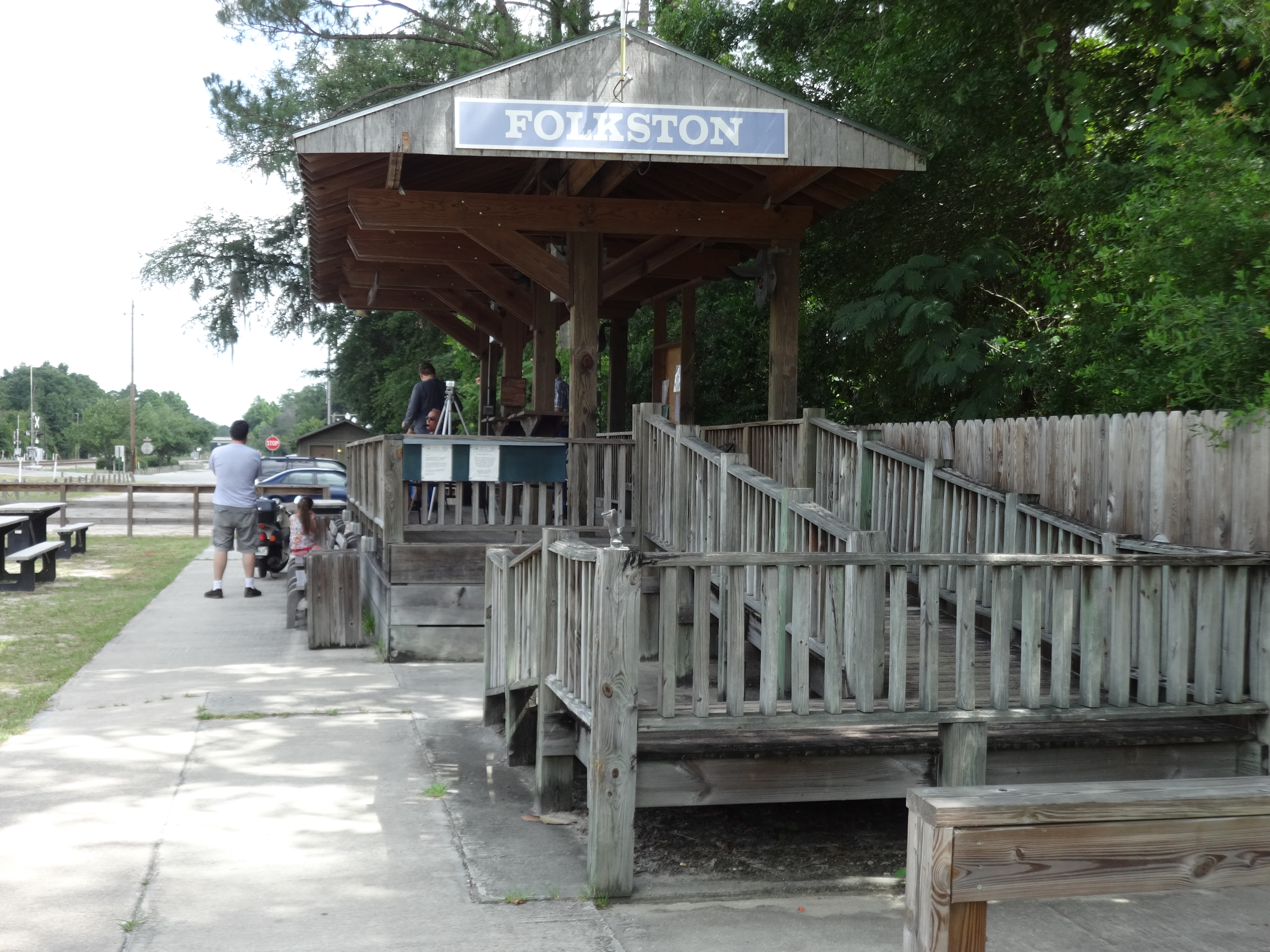
Folkston Railfan Platform

The Waycross Short Line remains in service today and is still operated by CSX Transportation. The segment from the Folkston Cutoff to Jacksonville (which was part of the Atlantic Coast Line main line) is now CSX's A Line (Nahunta Subdivision). From Waycross to Folkston, the line is now part of CSX's Jesup Subdivision. Both Rice Yard in Waycross and Moncrief Yard in Jacksonville remain major freight terminals for CSX.

The segment of the line from Folkston to Callahan, Florida, is sometimes informally known as the Folkston Funnel by rail enthusiasts since nearly all of CSX's traffic from the midwest and the northeast to Florida converge on that segment, which carries roughly 40–45 trains a day. The Folkston Railfan Platform was built in 2001 by the city for viewing trains.

== Historic stations ==
State	Milepost	City/Location	Station	Connections and notes
GA	ANA 587.8	Waycross	Waycross	junction with: Savannah, Florida and Western Railway (ACL); Brunswick and Western Railroad (SF&W); Waycross Air Line Railroad (AB&A/ACL)
GA	ANA 598.4		Braganza	
GA	ANA 605.2	Fort Mudge	Fort Mudge	
GA	ANA 607.8	Racepond	Race Pond	
GA			Charlton	
GA	ANA 615.7	Uptonville	Uptonville	
GA		Homeland	Homeland	
GA	ANA 621.1; A 602.5	Folkston	Folkston	junction with Folkston Cutoff (SF&W/ACL)
FL	A 608.5	Boulogne	Boulogne	
FL	A 612.1		Andrews	
FL	A 614.5	Hilliard	Hilliard	
FL	A 620.1	Dyal	Dyal	
FL	A 624.5	Callahan	Callahan	junction with Florida Railroad (FC&P/SAL)
FL	A 629.5		Ratliff	
FL	A 635.2	Jacksonville	Dinsmore	
FL		Jacksonville	Pickett	
FL	A 640.0	Jacksonville	Grand Crossing	junction with: Jacksonville and Southwestern Railroad (ACL); Atlantic, Valdosta and Western Railway (GSF/SOU)
FL	A 640.3	Jacksonville	Moncrief	
FL	A 643.7	Jacksonville	Jacksonville	junction with: Jacksonville, Tampa and Key West Railway (SF&W/ACL); Florida East Coast Railway; Florida Central and Western Railroad (FC&P/SAL); Fernandina and Jacksonville Railroad (FC&P/SAL)
