= Jacksonville Terminal Subdivision =

Railway line in Florida

The Jacksonville Terminal Subdivision is a group of railroad lines owned by CSX Transportation in and around Jacksonville, which was historically a major railroad hub. The Jacksonville Terminal Subdivision includes about 13.0 miles of track.

== Lines ==
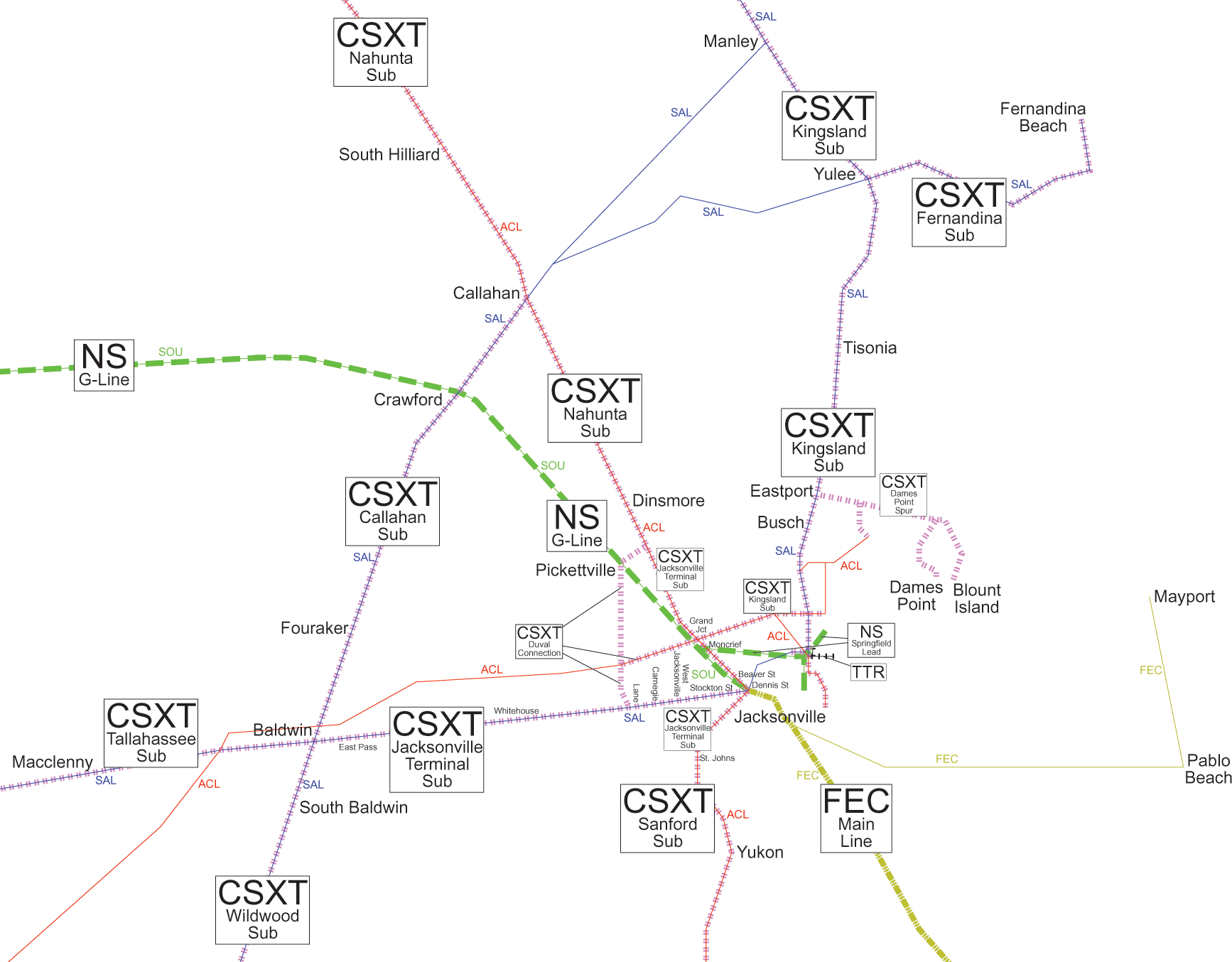
Scale map of current and former railroads in Jacksonville

=== A Line ===
The primary line through the Jacksonville Terminal Subdivision is the A Line, which is one of CSX's main lines in the eastern United States. Within the Jacksonville Terminal Subdivision, the A Line runs from Dinsmore south, passing Jackonville's Amtrak station, and through Grand Junction (historically known as Grand Crossing). Grand Junction is where it connects with the Kingsland Subdivision. Norfolk Southern Railway's Springfield Lead also crosses the A Line at Grand Junction.

The A Line continues from Grand Junction south through Moncrief Yard to Beaver Street Interlocking. Here, the A Line connects with the S Line west to Baldwin, as well as the Florida East Coast Railway and Norfolk Southern's Valdosta District.

From the interlocking, the A line continues southwest to St. Johns, where it continues as the Sanford Subdivision.

All of Amtrak's passenger services through Florida run on the A Line. The A Line was previously the main line of the Atlantic Coast Line Railroad.

=== S Line ===
The S Line currently runs east from Beaver Street Interlocking west to Baldwin. The S Line was previously the main line of the Seaboard Air Line Railroad. At Baldwin, the S Line continues south as the Wildwood Subdivision. It also connects with the Callahan Subdivision to the north and the Florida Gulf and Atlantic Railroad to the west at Baldwin. Despite being part of the S Line historically, the line's mileposts have the prefix SP.

== Yards ==
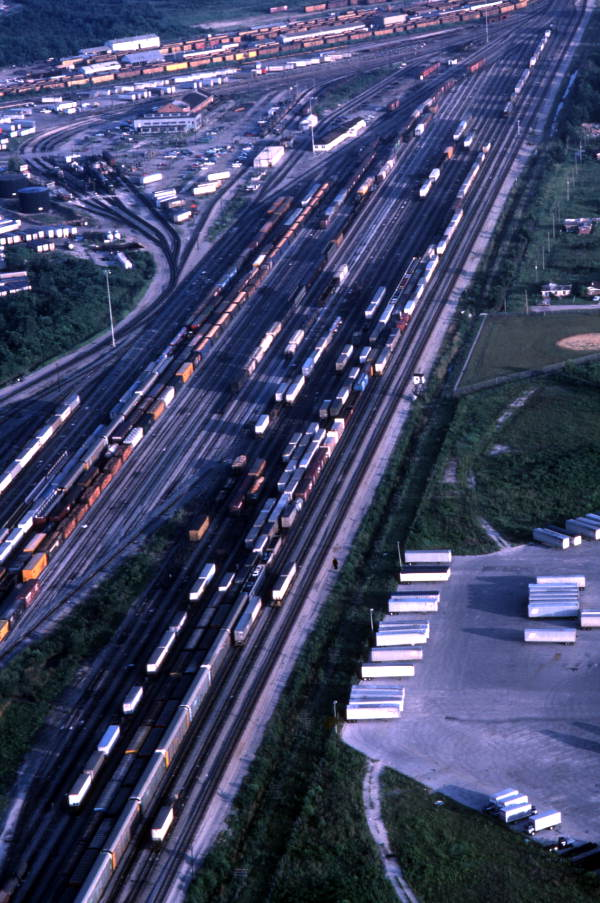
Aerial image of Moncrief Yard in 1982

Within the Jacksonville Terminal Subdivision, CSX operates two major yard facilities.

=== Moncrief Yard ===
Moncrief Yard is located on the A Line just north of Beaver Street Interlocking. It serves as CSX's primary classification yard for the Jacksonville area. Moncrief Yard was previously the Atlantic Coast Line Railroad's main yard in Jacksonville.

=== Duval Yard ===
Duval Yard, also known as Jax Ramp, is located just northwest central Jacksonville. Duval Yard serves as an intermodal terminal for Jacksonville. The yard and its connecting track were built in the late 1970s by the Seaboard Coast Line Railroad for that purpose since Moncrief Yard was becoming too overcrowded.

== History ==
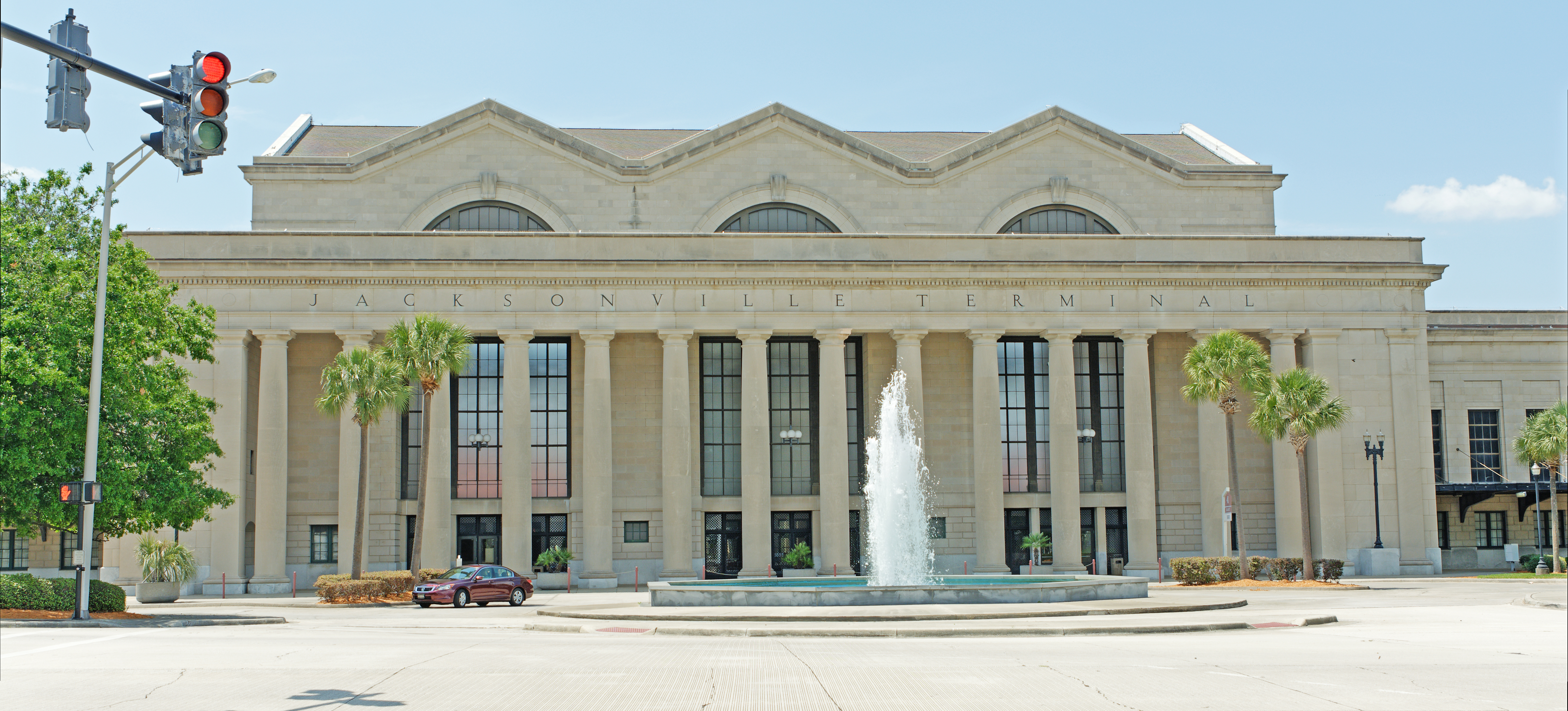
Jacksonville Union Terminal, now the Prime F. Osborn III Convention Center

Railroad lines in Jacksonville were largely built at the end of the 1800s.

CSX's A Line north of Jacksonville (which leads to the Nahunta Subdivision) was originally part of the East Florida Railway. The A Line south of Jacksonville (which leads to the Sanford Subdivision) was part of the Jacksonville, Tampa and Key West Railway. Both lines became part of the Plant System and later the Atlantic Coast Line Railroad. Grand Crossing was originally the junction between the East Florida Railway, the Jacksonville and Southwestern Railroad (now the Kingsland Subdivision), and the Atlantic, Valdosta and Western Railway (now Norfolk Southern).

The S Line from Jacksonville west to Baldwin Junction was part of the Florida Central and Peninsular Railroad, which became part of the Seaboard Air Line Railroad. The S Line previously continued east and north beyond Beaver Street Interlocking toward Panama Park prior to the 1990s. The former right of way of this segment is now the S-Line Urban Greenway. The remaining S Line north of Panama Park is now part of the Kingsland Subdivision. The Seaboard Air Line never operated a yard within Jacksonville. Their main yard for the Jacksonville area was just west of Jacksonville in Baldwin. Baldwin Yard is still in service and is now located on the Wildwood Subdivision.

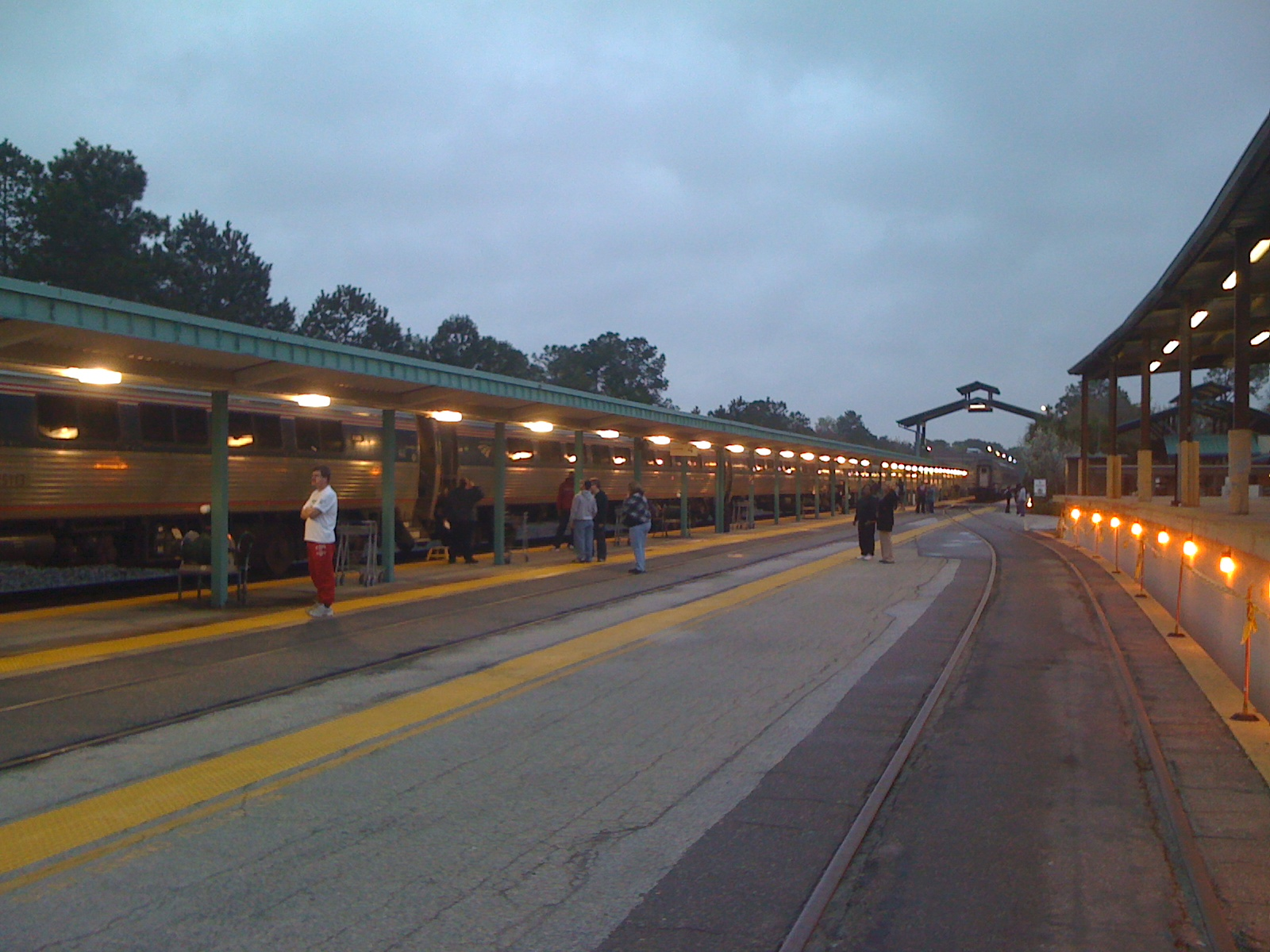
Jacksonville's current Amtrak station at the north end of the Jacksonville Terminal Subdivision

With a large number of railroads operating in Jacksonville, the Jacksonville Terminal Company was chartered in 1894 to coordinate train movement of multiple railroads in the area, manage yards, and build Jacksonville Union Terminal, which opened in 1919. By 1902, the Jacksonville Terminal Company and the Union Terminal were jointly owned by five railroads. The Atlantic Coast Line Railroad, Seaboard Air Line Railroad, and Florida East Coast Railway each owned 25% of the company, and the Southern Railway and the Georgia Southern and Florida Railway each with 12.5% ownership. The Jacksonville Terminal Company ceased operations in 1976 when the Union Terminal closed and Amtrak opened its current Jacksonville station on the northside of town.

An interlocking tower once stood at the north side of Beaver Street Interlocking. The tower was demolished in 1999 to accommodate the new wider Beaver Street (US 90) overpass. The interlocking is now controlled by Centralized traffic control signals controlled by dispatchers.

In 1967, the Atlantic Coast Line Railroad and Seaboard Air Line Railroad merged to form the Seaboard Coast Line Railroad. In the late 1970s, the Seaboard Coast Line built Duval Yard and Intermodal Ramp and associated tracks on the northwest side of town. Duval was built to handle intermodal traffic, since the areas other yards were too overcrowded by then. Duval Yard is connected to the A Line on the north end and the S Line on the south end.

Seaboard Coast Line became CSX Transportation in 1986 after merging with the Chessie System. Norfolk Southern and the Florida East Coast Railway have trackage rights on CSX to interchange with one another and with CSX at Moncrief Yard. CSX also has trackage rights on the Florida East Coast Railway into their Bowden Yard and on the Norfolk Southern into their Simpson Yard.

== See also ==
- List of CSX Transportation lines
