= Nahunta Subdivision =

Railway line in Florida and Georgia

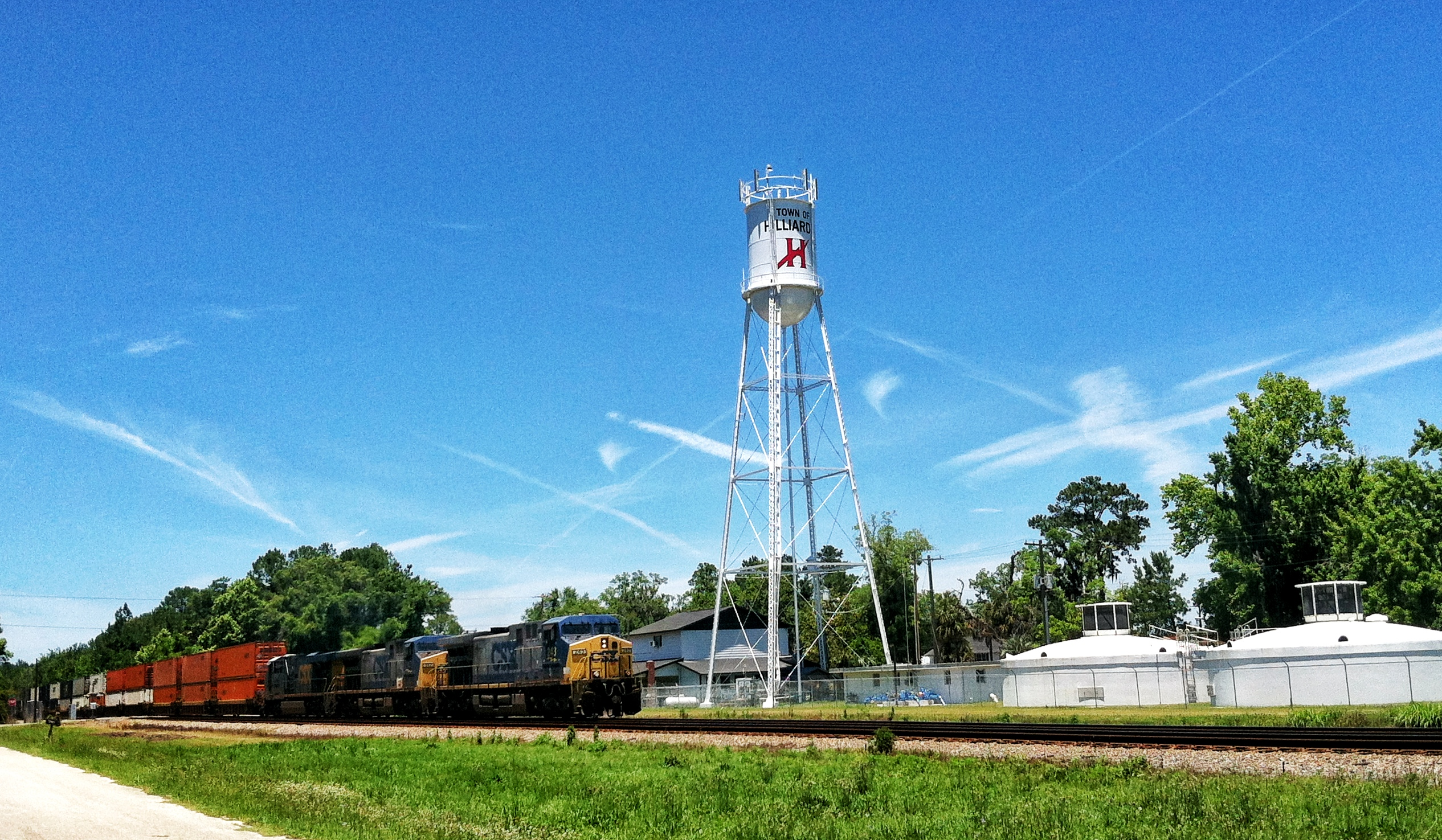
CSX train passing through Hilliard, Florida on the Nahunta Subdivision

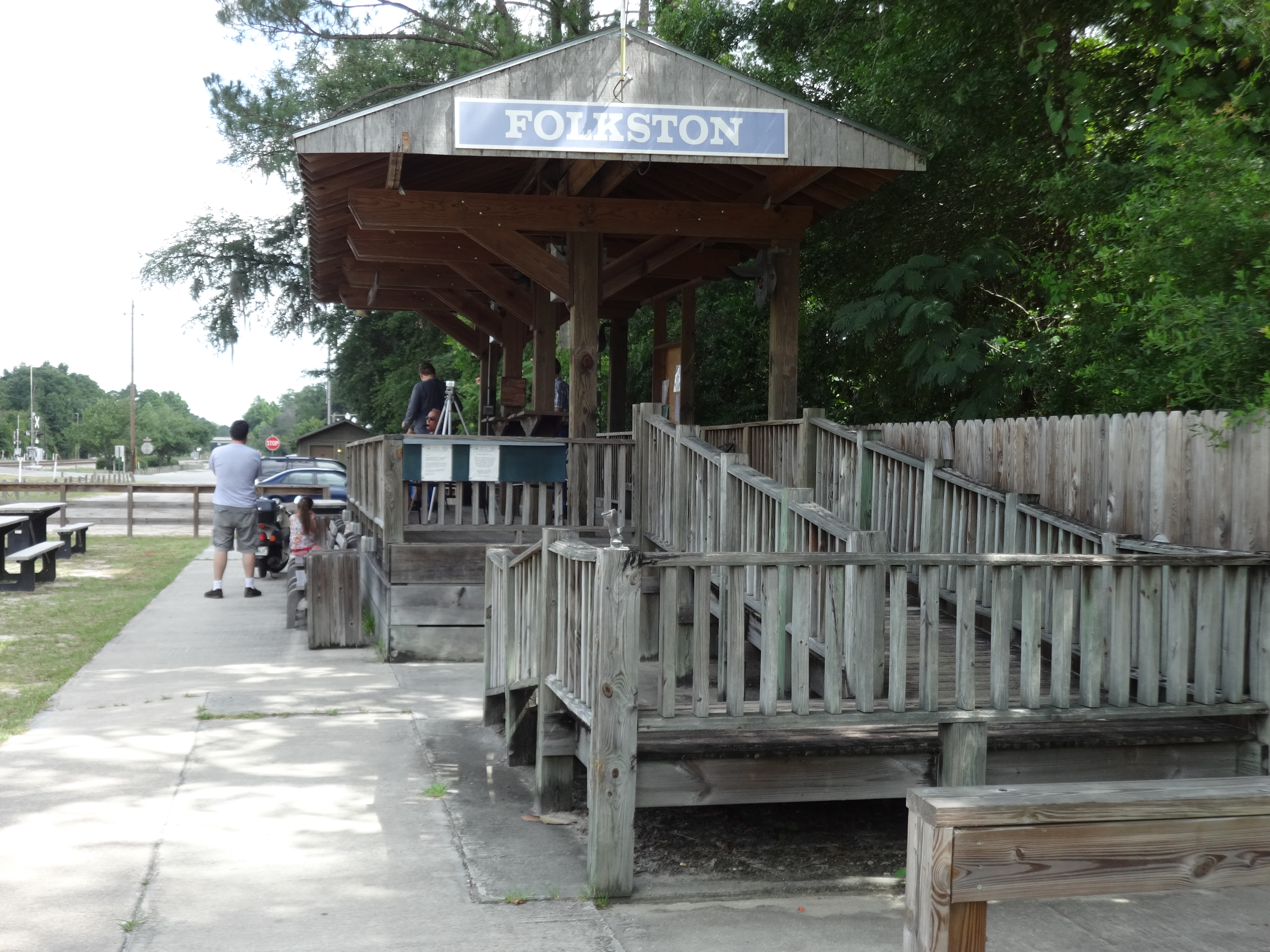
Folkston Railfan Platform

The Nahunta Subdivision is a railroad line owned by CSX Transportation in Florida and Georgia. The line runs along CSX's A Line from just south of Savannah, Georgia to just north of Jacksonville, Florida, a distance of 129.2 miles (207.9 km).

The southern end of the line is a particularly busy route for CSX. The Folkston Railfan Platform in Folkston, Georgia was by the city in 2001 for rail enthusiast to view the many passing trains on the line.

== Route description ==
The Nahunta Subdivision begins just south of Savannah on the south side of the Ogeechee River where it continues south from the Savannah Subdivision. From here, it runs southwest through Richmond Hill, Walthourville, and Ludowici to Jesup. In Jesup, the line splits with the Jesup Subdivision runnin southwest to Waycross and the Nahunta Subdivision turning south. From Jesup, the Nahunta Subdivision continues south through rural southern Georgia. It crosses the Brunswick Subdivision in Nahunta, the line's namesake.

Continuing south, the Nahunta Subdivision passes through Folkston where it connects with the south end of the Jesup Subdivision. Just south of Folkston, the Nahunta Subdivision crosses the St. Mary's River and enters Florida. In Florida, it turns southeast towards Jacksonville. The Nahunta Subdivision terminates just north of Jacksonville at Dinsmore, where the A Line enters the Jacksonville Terminal Subdivision.

== Operation ==
The Nahunta Subdivision is CSX's main route for trains entering Florida and it is double-tracked from Folkston, Georgia south. Amtrak's three daily Florida services traverse the line. The segment of the line from Folkston to Callahan, Florida, is sometimes informally known as the Folkston Funnel by rail enthusiasts since nearly all of CSX's traffic from the midwest and the northeast to Florida converge on that segment, which carries roughly 40–45 trains a day.

== History ==
The segment of the Nahunta Subdivision north of Jesup, Georgia, was originally part of the Atlantic and Gulf Railroad, which was chartered in 1856 (five years before the start of the American Civil War). The Atlantic and Gulf Railroad went bankrupt in 1877 and was bought by Henry B. Plant two years later. Plant incorporated it into his Savannah, Florida, and Western Railway (the main line of the Plant System).

From Folkston, Georgia, south to Jacksonville, Florida, the line was part of the Waycross and Florida Railway and the East Florida Railway. Those two lines, which were chartered by Henry Plant in 1880, began service in 1881.

The middle segment of the Nahunta Subdivision was built as the Plant System's Folkston Cutoff in 1901. It was built to provide a shortcut and bypass to Waycross, Georgia.

In 1902, the Plant System became part of the Atlantic Coast Line Railroad, with what is now the Nahunta Subdivision becoming part of the Atlantic Coast Line's main line. Though Atlantic Coast Line became part of CSX Transportation through various mergers from 1967 to 1986. The Nahunta Subdivision continues to be part of CSX's A Line (the designation for the former Atlantic Coast Line main line).

== See also ==
- List of CSX Transportation lines
