= Grand Crossing =

A Grand crossing is a bridge or tunnel at a major water body.

Grand Crossing may also refer to a place in the United States:

- Grand Crossing, Florida
- Greater Grand Crossing, Chicago, Illinois
  - 75th Street/Grand Crossing station
