= Plant system (disambiguation) =

Plant System was a system of railways and boats in the American South.

Plant system may also refer to:

- Ground tissue, three simple plant tissues
- Vascular tissue, a complex tissue found in vascular plants
- Epidermis (botany), the outer single-layered group of cells covering a plant
