= Bainbridge Northern Railway =

Overview
- Headquarters: Bainbridge, Georgia
- Locale: Georgia, United States
- Dates of operation: 1896–

Technical
- Length: 32 mi (51 km)

Known as "The Lumber Line," the Bainbridge Northern Railway was operated by the Flint River Lumber Company and originally began operations from Bainbridge, Georgia, to Eldorendo between 1896 and 1899. It was then extended to Paulina. While principally a logging railroad, it also operated passenger service until 1908. The railroad quit operating about 1925.

== Stations ==
Name	Mileage	Notes
West Bainbridge	0	Connection with Atlantic Coast Line Railroad and Georgia, Florida and Alabama Railway
Godfrey	4	
Wimsatt	6	
Callahan	9	
Eldorendo	11	
Sellers	14	
Rosina	21	
Elizabeth	25	
Paulina	32	
