= Folkston Cutoff =

Historic railroad in southeast Georgia

Overview
- Status: Still operating
- Owner: Plant System (1901-1902); Atlantic Coast Line Railroad (1902-1967); Seaboard Coast Line Railroad (1967-1986); CSX Transportation (1986-present)
- Termini: Jesup, Georgia; Folkston, Georgia

Technical
- Line length: 54.3 mi (87.4 km)
- Track gauge: 1,435 mm (4 ft 8 1/2 in) standard gauge
- Electrification: No
- Signalling: Centralized traffic control

The Folkston Cutoff is a railroad line in southern Georgia. It runs from Jesup southwest to Folkston, a distance of 54 miles. It was built in 1901 by the Plant System to allow trains from the northeast to Florida to bypass their busy terminal in Waycross.

== History ==
In 1881, the Plant System (founded by Henry B. Plant) built its second line into Florida, the Waycross Short Line. This line ran from the Plant system's main line (the Savannah, Florida and Western Railway) at Waycross southeast to Jacksonville, Florida, which was becoming a major rail junction and shipping port.

By 1893, the Plant system's competitor, the Florida Central and Peninsular Railroad (FC&P) (which later became the Seaboard Air Line Railroad) completed a line running directly from Savannah, Georgia to Jacksonville. This gave the FC&P an advantage since their route was 36 miles shorter between those locations than the Plant system's route through Waycross. Plant System officials were distraught over the completion of this line as they thought building a line through the marshes closer to the coast was not feasible.

In 1901, two years after Henry Plant's death, the Plant System built the Folkston Cutoff to shorten the distance between Savannah and Jacksonville. The Folkston Cutoff would shorten it by about 16 miles and would bypass the Plant System's busy terminal in Waycross. It crossed the Brunswick and Western Railroad in Nahunta, another Plant System line. The Folkston Cutoff would be one of the last additions to the Plant System before it was sold to the Atlantic Coast Line Railroad in 1902.

The Atlantic Coast Line recognized the importance of the Folkston Cutoff and made it part of their main line (which in its entirety ran from Richmond, Virginia to Tampa, Florida). The Atlantic Coast Line would fully expand its main line to double track in 1925 along with the installation of automatic block signaling. Though much of the Folkston Cutoff has been restored to a single track. The Atlantic Coast Line became the Seaboard Coast Line Railroad in 1967 after merging with their former rival, the Seaboard Air Line Railroad (who operated their competing route to the east). In 1980, the Seaboard Coast Line's parent company merged with the Chessie System, creating the CSX Corporation. The CSX Corporation initially operated the Chessie and Seaboard Systems separately until 1986, when they were merged into CSX Transportation.

== Current operations ==
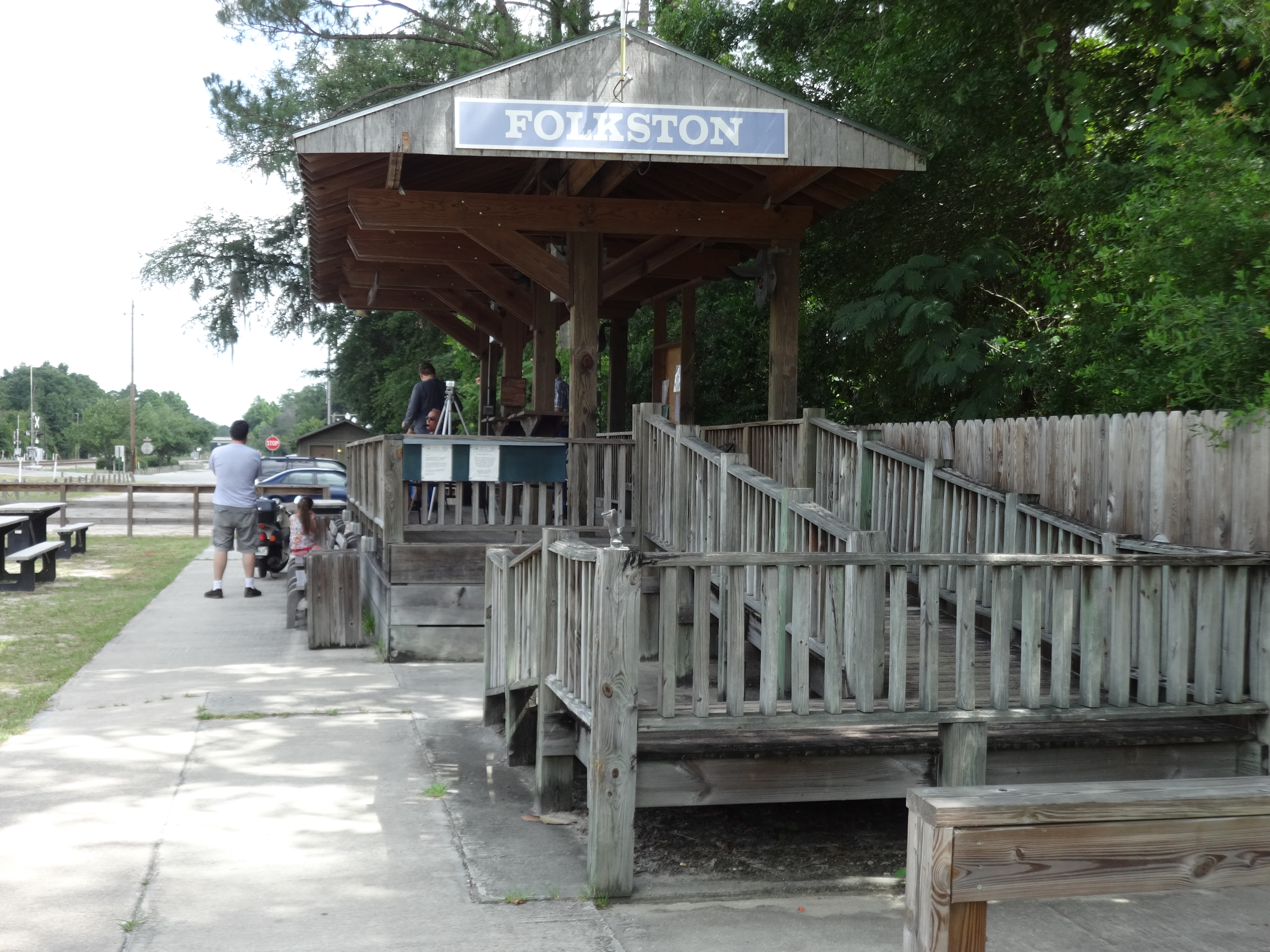
Folkston Railfan Platform

The Folkston Cutoff remains in service today and it is now part of CSX's A Line (the designation for the former Atlantic Coast Line main line). This segment is designated as the Nahunta Subdivision and it remains an important route for trains running from the northeast to Florida. All of Amtrak's Florida service uses the Folkston Cutoff.

In Folkson, the Folkston Railfan Platform was built in 2001 by the city for viewing trains. This was built since most of CSX's traffic to Florida passes through Folkston, some of which runs on the Folkston Cutoff.

== Station listing ==
| Milepost | City/Location | Station | Connections and notes |
|---|---|---|---|
| A 548.2 | Jesup | Jesup | junction with Savannah, Florida and Western Railway (ACL) |
| A 553.0 | | Leake | |
| A 558.3 | | Broadhurst | |
| A 563.5 | | O'Neal | |
| A 567.7 | Hortense | Hortense | Junction with Brunswick and Birmingham Railroad (AB&A/ACL) |
| A 573.2 | | Raybon | |
| A 576.9 | Nahunta | Nahunta | junction with Brunswick and Western Railroad (SF&W/ACL) |
| A 582.0 | | Shea | |
| A 588.5 | | Winokur | |
| A 592.0 | | Newell | |
| A 598.4 | | Burch | |
| A 602.5 | Folkston | Folkston | junction with Waycross and Florida Railroad (SF&W/ACL) |
