= Eldorendo, Georgia =

- Unincorporated community
- Location within Georgia
- Coordinates: 31°02′39″N 84°39′07″W
- Country: United States
- State: Georgia
- County: Decatur County
- Elevation: 130 ft (40 m)
- ZIP codes: 39825, 39817, 39837
- GNIS feature ID: 0313895

Eldorendo is an unincorporated community located in Decatur County in southwest Georgia, United States.

Eldorendo is generally located on U.S. Route 27 and Georgia State Route 1, about halfway between the cities of Colquitt and Bainbridge. Some of the major roads in the Eldorendo area are Old Eldorendo Road, Brinson Airbase Road, Donaldson Road and Church Street. Due to Eldorendo being unincorporated, it has no formally recognized government or city council or any public utilities system. Even though Eldorendo is a small unincorporated community, it is covered by three zip codes: 39825, Brinson; 39817, Bainbridge; and 39837, Colquitt.

== History ==
The community was named for Eldorendo Virginia Higgs Brown (1835–1904). She and her husband, S. Morgan Brown (1826–1914), moved to the area in the 1870s. When the new railroad came through the S. Morgan Brown plantation a post office was established. Eldorendo Brown decided to apply for the position of Postmistress. When filling out the required government forms, she signed her name "Eldorendo Virginia Brown". The notice of her appointment came along with a statement that the postal officials discovered the town had no name and they had selected the name "Eldorendo" from the first given name on her paperwork. Eldorendo Brown and her husband are both buried in the Eldorendo Baptist Church Cemetery. After Eldorendo died, her daughter, Ona Brown Pridgen, became the Postmistress.

Victor Smith was the next Postmaster of Eldorendo until the post office was closed sometime during the early- to mid-1950s. It was re-opened in the late 1950s and was operated by Calista Powell Jester Barrett. It was closed again in the late 1960s due to lack of use and improved road development which allowed easier mail delivery to the rural areas.

== Geography ==
Eldorendo is located at 31°02′39″N 84°39′07″W at an elevation of 131 feet.
