= Racepond, Georgia =

Unincorporated community in Georgia, U.S.

Coordinates: 31°00′11″N 82°07′46″W

Racepond is an unincorporated community in Charlton County, in the U.S. state of Georgia.

== History ==
Racepond had its start when the Waycross and Florida Railroad was extended to that point. The community took its name from a nearby natural pond where horse races were conducted in the 1830s. A post office called Racepond was established in 1881, and remained in operation until 1953. The community is known for being where Georgia State Routes 15 and 121 split from US 1, 23 and GA 4.
