= Atlantic, Valdosta and Western Railway =

Railway in Georgia and Florida, U.S. (1899–1902)

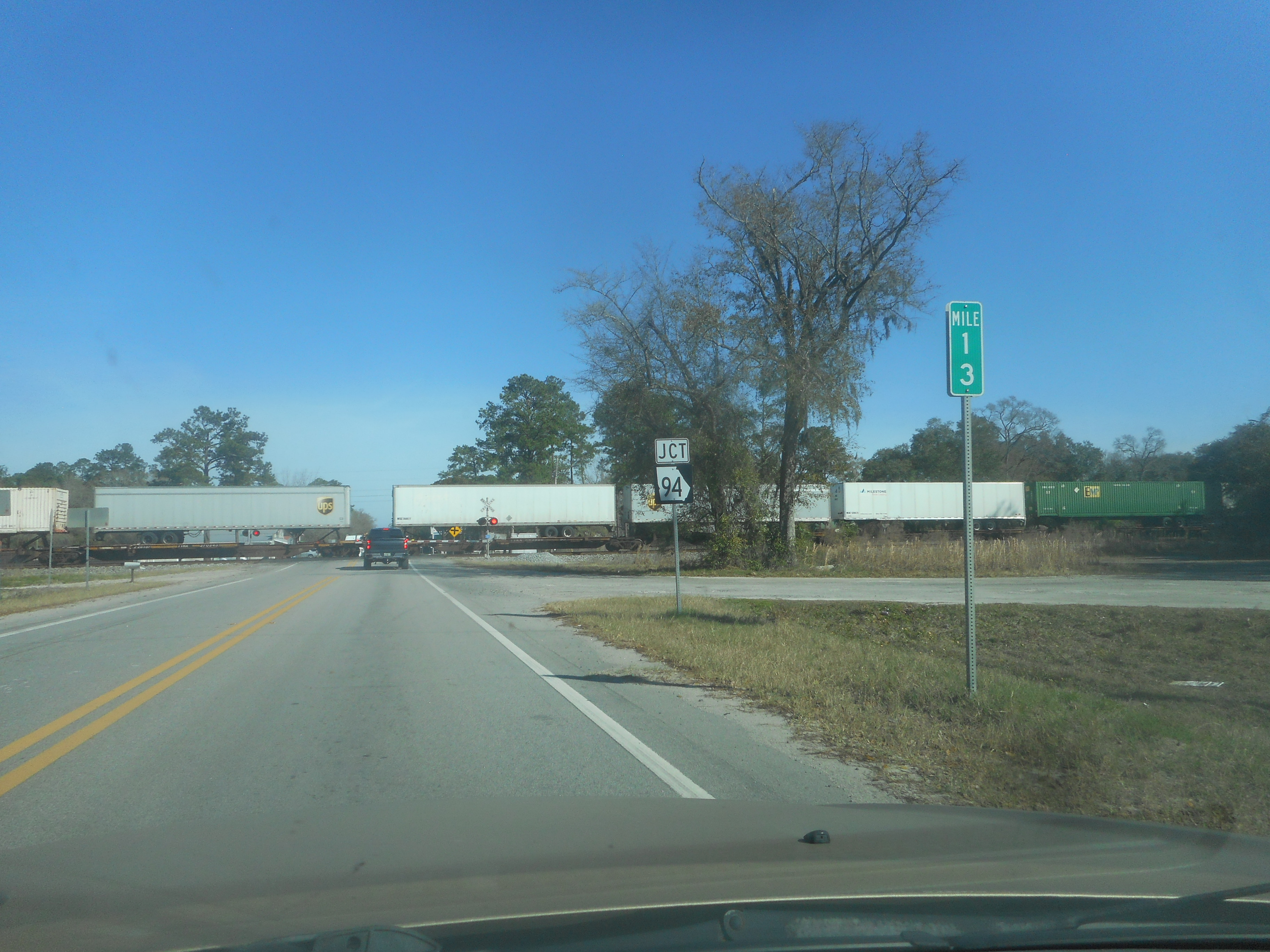
- A Nortfolk Southern intermodal train crosses GA 121-23 in St. George, Georgia along the former AV&W.

Overview
- Locale: Georgia and Florida, USA
- Dates of operation: 1897 (chartered); 1899 (opened)–1902
- Successor: Southern Railway

Technical
- Length: 110 mi (180 km) (mainline); 45 mi (72 km) (branches)

Chartered in 1897, the Atlantic, Valdosta and Western Railway operated from Valdosta, Georgia, to Jacksonville, Florida, and was nicknamed the Jacksonville Short Line. The line was opened in July 1899, prefaced by a "bohemian smoker" banquet in Valdosta on June 27, 1899. In May 1902, the railroad was purchased by the Georgia Southern and Florida Railway and their parent company Southern Railway. The line was quickly integrated into Southern's passenger schedules with travel between Valdosta and Jacksonville advertised at about 3 1/2 hours. Southern took control of the AV&W on July 1, 1902.

In 1899, the railroad wanted to access the Jacksonville union terminal for its passenger trains. The Jacksonville Terminal Company, owners of the station, refused the railroad entry so the railroad took the matter to the Florida railroad commission. The commission, issuing its very first ruling ever, decided on September 4, 1899, that the railroad should be granted access in exchange for an appropriate station fee, which was specified by the commission at a rate $4,300 less per year than the other railroad companies that were already using the station, but the Terminal Company still refused, taking the matter to court. While the case was making its way, the railroad purchased one fourth of the stock of the Jacksonville Terminal Company, so that when it finally arrived at the state supreme court in December 1900, the court dismissed the case noting that the railroad had full access through its stock ownership and the case was no longer valid.

Shortly before the railroad was sold, work began on an extension of the line from Valdosta to Albany, Georgia, with the goal of reaching Moultrie.

The line remains in service today, and it now operates as Norfolk Southern Railway's Valdosta District.

== Historic stations ==
| State | Milepost | City/Location | Station | Connections and notes |
|---|---|---|---|---|
| GA | 151.2 G | Valdosta | Valdosta | junction with: Savannah, Florida and Western Railroad (ACL); Georgia and Florida Railroad (SOU); Georgia Southern and Florida Railway Main Line (SOU); Valdosta, Moultrie and Western Railroad |
| GA | 161.2 G | Blanton | Blanton | |
| GA | 165.0 G | Howell | Howell | |
| GA | 167.6 G | | Mayday | |
| GA | 173.4 G | | Haylow | junction with: Savannah, Florida and Western Railroad Florida Division (ACL); Statenville Railway (GSF/SOU) |
| GA | 176.9 G | Fruitland | Fruitland | |
| GA | 178.7 G | | Thelma | |
| GA | 184.0 G | | Craig Junction | |
| GA | 194.0 G | Calhoun | Calhoun | |
| GA | 185.6 G | | Headlight | |
| GA | 190.0 G | | Finlayson | |
| GA | 192.3 G | | Colon | |
| GA | 194.0 G | | Vickers Junction | |
| GA | 198.4 G | Fargo | Fargo | |
| GA | 199.0 G | Edith | Edith | |
| GA | 200.0 G | | Duncan | |
| GA | 204.4 G | Council | Council | |
| GA | 205.7 G | | Ewing | |
| FL | 207. G | | Morehead | |
| FL | 216.5 G | | Eddy | |
| FL | 222.6 G | | Baxter | |
| GA | 223.2 G | Moniac | Moniac | |
| GA | | | Oliver | |
| GA | 230.0 G | | Clarking | |
| GA | 232.7 G | | Battenville | |
| GA | 234.7 G | St. George | St. George | |
| FL | 237.0 G | | St. Marys | |
| FL | 239.0 G | Kent | Kent | |
| FL | 239.0 G | | Johnson City | |
| FL | 244.1 G | Crawford | Crawford | junction with Florida Central and Peninsular Railroad Southern Division (SAL) |
| FL | | | Keen's | |
| FL | 250.4 G | | Plummer | |
| FL | 253.5 G | | Spalding | |
| FL | 254.3 G | | Kingsgrove | |
| FL | 256.6 G | | Hoyt | |
| FL | 258.2 G | Jacksonville | Simpson Yard | |
| FL | 258.0 G | Jacksonville | Grand Crossing | junction with Jacksonville and Southwestern Railroad (ACL) |
| FL | 261.8 G | Jacksonville | Jacksonville | original station located on East Bay Street relocated to Jacksonville Union Terminal in 1919 junction with: East Florida Railway (ACL); Jacksonville, Tampa and Key West Railway (ACL); Florida Central and Peninsular Railroad (SAL); Florida East Coast Railway |
