= Byrd Street Station =

Railway station in Richmond, Virginia

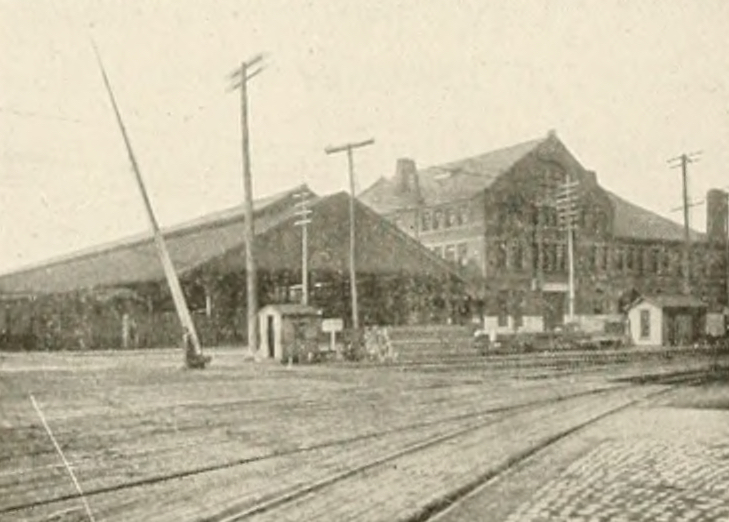

General information
- Location: 701 East Byrd Street, Richmond, Virginia
- System: regional and inter-city rail station
- Train operators: Richmond, Fredericksburg and Potomac Railroad; Richmond and Petersburg Railroad; Atlantic Coast Line Railroad

History
- Opened: 1887
- Closed: 1958

Byrd Street Station was a railroad station in Richmond, Virginia. Originally established in 1887 as a joint project between the Richmond and Petersburg Railroad and the Richmond, Fredericksburg, and Potomac Railroad, the station served passengers traveling north and south through Richmond. In 1919, the new Union Station on Broad Street became the main station for the RF&P and the R&P's successor, the Atlantic Coast Line Railroad. Consequently, Byrd Street Station fell into disuse. The second and third floors were removed around the late 1950s while the first floor remained until the late 1960s/early 1970s. Today, the site of the railroad station is home to the Federal Reserve Bank of Richmond.
