= Folkston Railfan Platform =

Train-viewing shelter along fairly busy CSX rail corridor in Folkston, Georgia, USA

Coordinates: 30.83032°N 82.00754°W

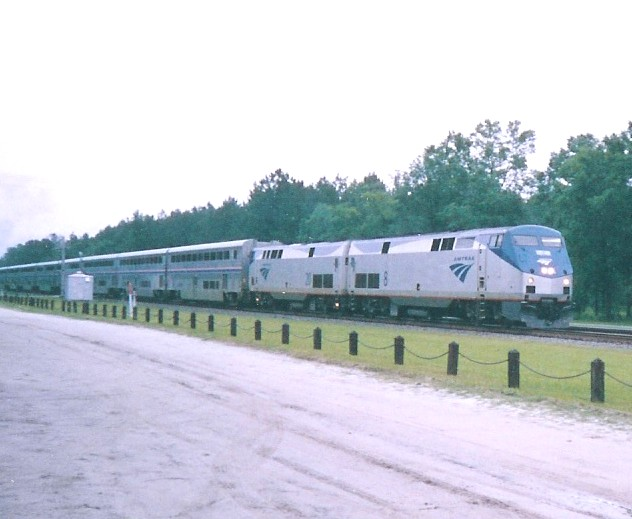
An Amtrak Auto Train passes by the Folkston Railfan Platform.

The Folkston Railfan Platform is located in Folkston, Georgia along CSX Transportation's Nahunta Subdivision, and provides a location where railfans can safely view and photograph trains. With the help of a $30,000 state grant, the city built the train-watching platform in 2001 and is promoted by county and state tourism agencies.

Since that time, the city has attracted thousands of railfans from across the nation who come to Folkston to see the dozens of CSX and the six Amtrak trains (including the daily Amtrak Auto Train) that operate between cities in Florida and cities in the south, midwest, and northeast. The platform is equipped with ceiling fans and a radio scanner that allows railfans to hear railroad-related radio traffic. Wireless internet access is available.

The double-track mainline that passes through town sees about 40 trains each day. Most CSX freight traffic into or out of Florida passes through Folkston.
