= Dyal, Florida =

Unincorporated community in Florida, U.S.

Dyal is an unincorporated community in Nassau County, Florida, United States. It is located between U.S. 1 and County Road 115, in the western part of the county.

== Geography ==
Dyal is located at 30°37′16″N 81°52′13″W.
