= Fort Mudge, Georgia =

Unincorporated community in Georgia, U.S.

Coordinates: 31°03′51.81″N 82°11′11.44″W

Fort Mudge is an unincorporated community in Brantley County in the U.S. state of Georgia.

== History ==
Fort Mudge (the fort after which the community is named) is described as "a temporary fortification during the Florida war", established in 1813. It was abandoned at the end of the war, although it may have been briefly reoccupied in 1838 during the Second Seminole War.

== In popular culture ==
It is occasionally mentioned in the comic strip Pogo, being quite near the edge of the Okefenokee Swamp that is the strip's setting.

== Species of special concern ==
The Georgia Department of Natural Resources lists several species of special concern in or near Fort Mudge.

- Ctenium floridanum Florida Orange-grass
- Gopherus polyphemus Gopher Tortoise
- Hartwrightia floridana Hartwrightia
- Neofiber alleni Round-tailed Muskrat
- Ophisaurus compressus Island Glass Lizard
- Picoides borealis Red-cockaded Woodpecker
- Pteroglossaspis ecristata Crestless Plume Orchid
- Scirpus etuberculatus Canby's Club-rush

== Roads ==
U.S. Route 1 (concurrent with U.S. Route 23 and Georgia State Route 4 here, and also identified as Jacksonville Highway) runs through Fort Mudge.
