= Uptonville, Georgia =

Unincorporated community in Georgia, U.S.

Coordinates: 30°53′59″N 82°04′05″W

Uptonville is an unincorporated community in Charlton County, in the U.S. state of Georgia.

== History ==
A variant name was "Wainwright". A post office called Wainright was established in 1883, the name changed to Uptonville in 1909, and the post office closed in 1916. The present name is after John and Ben Upton, proprietors of a local sawmill.
