= Grand Crossing, Florida =

Coordinates: 30°21′32″N 81°43′15″W

Grand Crossing, Florida is a railway junction located in Jacksonville, Florida.

The site was so named in 1899 when two railroads crossed the Waycross–Jacksonville line of the Savannah, Florida & Western (Plant System) at almost the same location near Jacksonville, Florida. One was the Atlantic, Valdosta & Western and the other the Jacksonville & Southwestern Railroad. The AV&W extended from Valdosta, Georgia, to a terminal on East Bay Street in downtown Jacksonville. The J&SW was owned by the Cummer Lumber Company, and extended from its mills on the St. Johns River north of the then-city limits of Jacksonville to Newberry, Florida. The J&SW built a spur paralleling the AV&W to a terminal adjacent to its on East Bay Street.

Thomas Danson owned The Dairy farm surrounding the area of Grand Crossing. He was appointed Postmaster by Franklin D. Roosevelt, which he operated until his death in the late 1940s
