= Plant System =

Historic railroad system

- Map of Savannah, Florida and Western Railway

Overview
- Locale: United States Atlantic coast
- Dates of operation: 1882–1902
- Successor: Atlantic Coast Line Railroad

Technical
- Track gauge: 4 ft 8 1/2 in (1,435 mm) standard gauge
- Previous gauge: 3 ft (914 mm) and 5 ft (1,524 mm) gauge lines also present

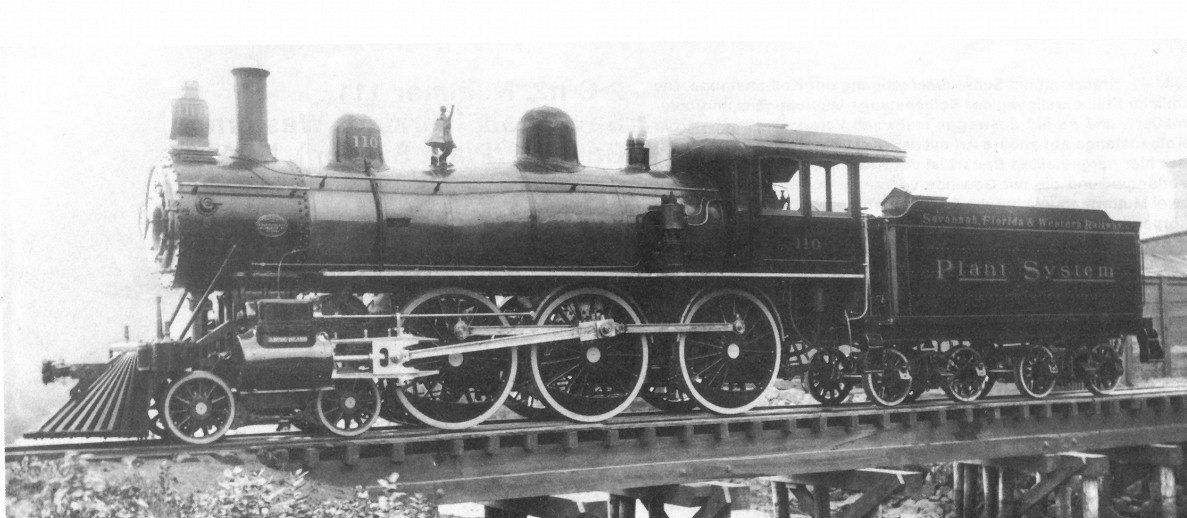
Savannah, Florida & Western Railway's Locomotive No. 110, built in 1900. In a 1901 test, sister engine No. 111 averaged 120mph for 5 miles.

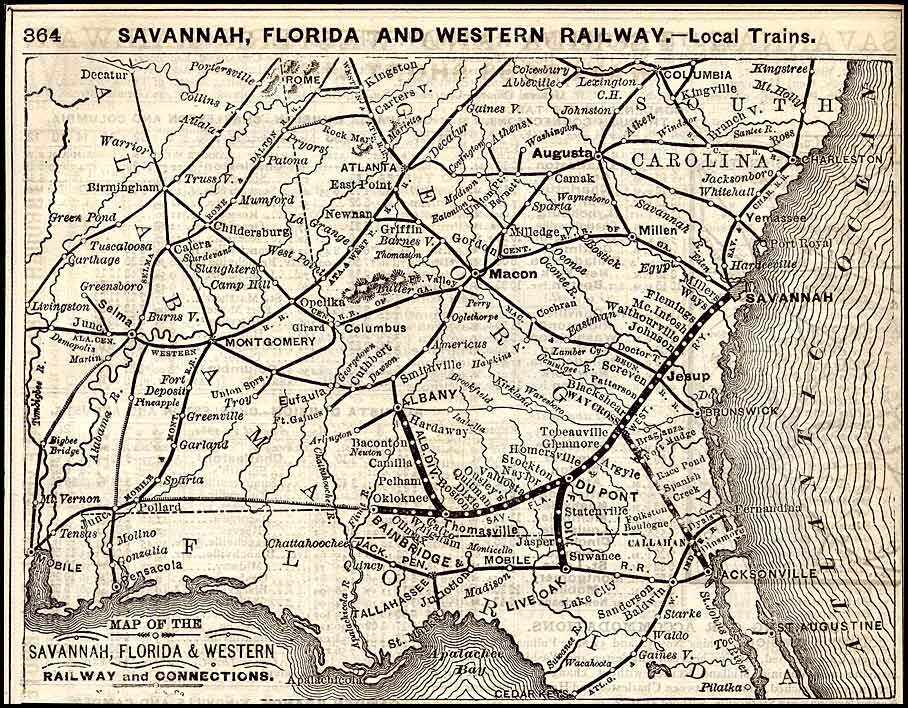
1882 map

The Plant System, named after its owner, Henry B. Plant, was a system of railroads and steamboats in the U.S. South, taken over by the Atlantic Coast Line Railroad in 1902. The original line of the system was the Savannah, Florida and Western Railway, running across southern Georgia. The Plant Investment Company was formed in 1882 to lease and buy other railroads and expand the system. Other major lines incorporated into the system include the Savannah and Charleston Railroad and the Brunswick and Western Railroad.

== History ==
The Atlantic and Gulf Railroad went bankrupt on January 1, 1877, and Henry Plant bought it on November 4, 1879, reorganizing it as the Savannah, Florida and Western Railway on December 9.

Plant bought the Savannah and Charleston Railroad (opened 1860) in 1880, reorganizing it as the Charleston and Savannah Railway. That acquisition extended the line from Savannah northeast to Charleston, South Carolina, where the Ashley River Railroad (operated by the C&S) connected to the Northeastern Railroad (later part of the Atlantic Coast Line Railroad main line).

The Waycross and Florida Railroad and East Florida Railway were chartered in February 1880, forming the Georgia and Florida parts of the "Waycross Short Line". That line, running from the main line at Waycross southeast to Jacksonville, Florida, opened in April 1881.

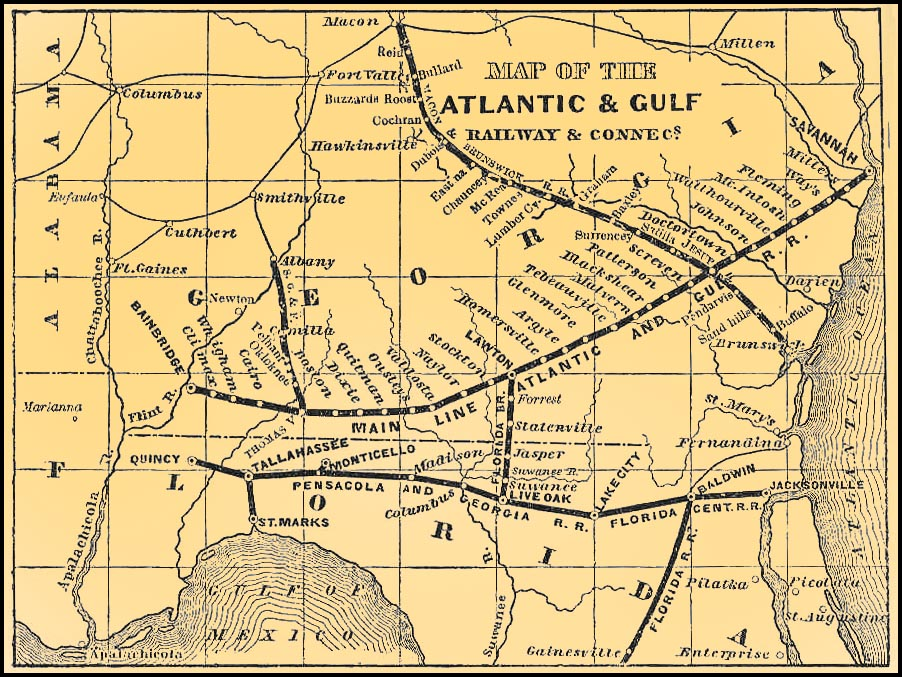
1870 map with connections

In 1882, the Chattahoochee Branch opened from Climax on the main line southwest to the Florida state line, where the Chattahoochee and East Pass Railroad (chartered 1881) continued to River Junction, Florida, a hamlet which later came to be known as Chattahoochee, Florida. At River Junction, the Louisville and Nashville Railroad's Pensacola and Atlantic Railroad continued west, and the Florida Central and Western Railroad ran east to Jacksonville.

The Live Oak and Rowland's Bluff Railroad and Live Oak, Tampa and Charlotte Harbor Railroad were chartered in 1881 to continue the short Florida Branch south from Live Oak further into Florida (eventually reaching Gainesville with a branch to Lake City). Plant tried to acquire the 3 ft (914 mm) narrow gauge Florida Southern Railway to continue this line, but was unsuccessful, and on May 4, 1883, he bought 3/5 of the stock of the 3 ft narrow gauge South Florida Railroad. At the time, the only connection between this system, with a main line from Sanford west to Tampa, was via steamboats on the St. Johns River from Jacksonville to Sanford.

The Plant Investment Company was formed in 1882 to lease and buy other railroads and expand the system.

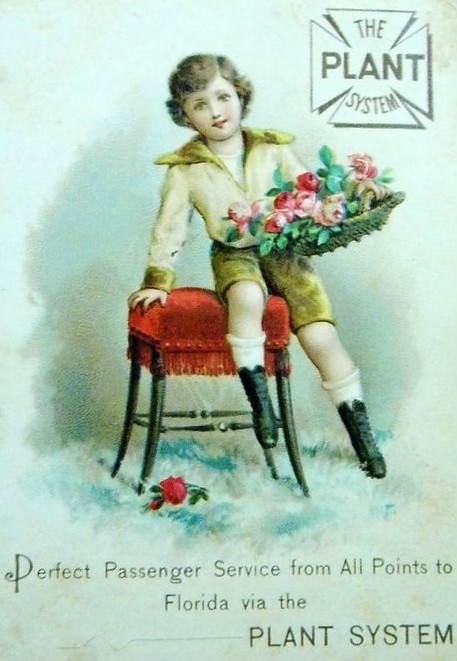
Advertising trade card for the railroad.

The various lines of the SF&W were consolidated into one company in 1884. Specifically, the following companies lost their corporate existence:

- Waycross and Florida Railroad and East Florida Railway (Waycross Short Line)
- Chattahoochee and East Pass Railroad (Chattahoochee Branch)
- Live Oak and Rowland's Bluff Railroad and Live Oak, Tampa and Charlotte Harbor Railroad (Florida Division)

The Brunswick and Western Railroad, opened in the late 1850s as the Brunswick and Florida Railroad, was bought by Plant in 1884.

In 1886, the system was changed to 4 ft 8 1/2 in (1,435 mm) standard gauge; it had previously consisted of 5 ft (1,524 mm) broad gauge lines and 3 ft (914 mm) narrow gauge lines.

=== Expansion into Alabama and central Florida ===
In 1887 the Green Pond, Walterboro and Branchville Railway opened as a short branch of the main line to Walterboro, South Carolina. The Walterborough and Western Railroad continued that line to Ehrhardt in 1896, and the two were merged into the Green Pond, Walterboro and Branchville Railroad in 1900.

On May 30, 1887, Florida state law chapter 3794 was approved, authorizing the SF&W to build lines from Tallahassee and Monticello north to the Georgia state line, connecting to branches from Thomasville, Georgia. The Tallahassee Branch was never built, but the Monticello Branch opened in 1888.

Plant obtained a controlling interest in the Alabama Midland Railway in July 1890. That line continued the main line from Bainbridge west to Montgomery, Alabama. The Southwestern Alabama Railway and Abbeville Southern Railway, two branches of that line, were acquired in the 1890s.

In 1890, the 3 ft narrow gauge Florida Southern Railway went into receivership and remained so for two years. During this time, its Charlotte Harbor branch operated independently and converted this portion of the line to 4 ft 8 1/2 in. In 1892, Plant bought the Florida Southern Railway under foreclosure and reorganized it as the Florida Southern Railroad. At this time, the Florida Southern system stretched from the south end of the Plant System at Gainesville south via Ocala, using trackage rights over the South Florida Railroad's Pemberton Ferry Branch, to Punta Gorda. The Florida Southern Railroad was integrated with the rest of the Plant System in 1896 and was converted to 4 ft 8 1/2 in that same year.

The Silver Springs, Ocala and Gulf Railroad was chartered in 1877 and opened in 1892, running from Ocala west to Dunnellon and then south to Homosassa and Inverness. A connection was built from Inverness to the South Florida Railroad at Pemberton Ferry.

The Winston and Bone Valley Railroad, opened in 1892 to serve phosphate mines near Lakeland, became part of the Plant System in 1896.

The Tampa and Thonotosassa Railroad was incorporated in 1893, running northeast from the South Florida Railroad in Tampa to the small town of Thonotosassa.

In 1895, Plant bought the 3 ft narrow gauge Sanford and St. Petersburg Railroad (previously the Orange Belt Railway) in 1895, which stretched across the state from Sanford to St. Petersburg. The most profitable section of this line was immediately converted to 4 ft 8 1/2 in, leaving the remaining section from Trilby to Sanford in its original gauge. The 4 ft 8 1/2 in Florida Midland Railway in the Orlando area was acquired in 1896, its line north of the Sanford and St. Petersburg Railroad was abandoned, and its remaining track from Sanford to Kissimmee was converted to 3 ft narrow gauge. By keeping these two connecting lines the same narrow gauge, they were able to work in conjunction with one another, utilizing the same narrow gauge equipment from both the Sanford and St. Petersburg Railroad and the recently converted Florida Southern Railroad.

In 1899, the Jacksonville, Tampa and Key West Railway, except for the branch to Titusville (which had been sold to the Florida East Coast Railway), was reorganized and bought by Plant as the Jacksonville and St. Johns River Railway. This supplied a connection between Jacksonville and Sanford without the need for a steamboat transfer at each end, as well as system connections at Tavares and Palatka.

The Plant System built the nearly straight 54 mi (87 km) Folkston Cutoff in southeast Georgia in 1901. This ran from the old Waycross and Florida Railroad at Folkston north via Nahunta to Jesup on the SF&W mainline, allowing trains to bypass Waycross and save 19 mi (31 km) over the old route.

In 1901, the Green Pond, Walterboro and Branchville Railroad, the Ashley River Railroad, the Abbeville Southern Railway; and Southern Alabama Railroad were all consolidated into the Savannah, Florida and Western Railway.

In 1901, the following companies were also merged into the SF&W:

- Alabama Midland Railway
- Brunswick and Western Railroad
- Charleston and Savannah Railway

In 1902 the Atlantic Coast Line Railroad acquired the entire Plant System, connecting at Charleston, SC. The components were soon merged into the ACL. The system has since become part of CSX after several mergers.

== Station listing ==
Main Line (Savannah, Florida and Western Railway)

Milepost	City/Location	Station	Connections and notes
A 490.9	Savannah	Savannah	continues as Charleston and Savannah Railroad (Plant) junction with: Savannah and Atlantic Railroad (CoG); South Bound Railroad (FC&P/SAL); Georgia and Alabama Railway (SAL)
A 503.1		Miller's	
A 504.4		Burroughs	junction with Florida Central and Peninsular Railroad Northern Division (SAL)
A 508.6	Richmond Hill	Way's	later renamed Richmond Hill
A 514.4		Fleming	
A 522.8		McIntosh	junction with Savannah, Hinesville and Western Railway
A 528.8	Walthourville	Walthourville	
A 537.6	Ludowici	Ludowici	junction with Georgia Coast and Piedmont Railroad originally Johnston
A 543.7		Doctortown	
A 548.2; AN 548.2	Jesup	Jesup	Amtrak Silver Meteor junction with: Folkston Cutoff; Macon and Brunswick Railroad (SOU)
		Drady's	
		Steam Mills	
AN 559.5	Screven	Screven	
AN 567.2	Offerman	Offerman	junction with Brunswick and Birmingham Railway (ACL)
AN 569.6		Patterson	
AN 577.6	Blackshear	Blackshear	
AN 587.8	Waycross	Waycross	originally Malvern junction with: Waycross and Florida Railroad (SF&W/ACL); Brunswick and Western Railroad (SF&W); Waycross Air Line Railroad (AB&A/ACL)
		Tebeauville	
		Glenmore	junction with Brunswick and Albany Railroad (SF&W, abandoned ca. 1871)
AN 607.4		Argyle	
AN 613.4		Homersville	
AN 622.3	Dupont	Dupont	junction with Florida Division originally Lawton
AN 628.9		Stockton	
AN 634.8		Naylor	junction with Lakeland Railway
AN 649.8	Valdosta	Valdosta	junction with: Georgia and Florida Railroad (SOU); Georgia Southern and Florida Railway (SOU); Atlantic, Valdosta and Western Railway (GSF/SOU); Valdosta, Moultrie and Western Railroad
AN 657.9		Ousley	
AN 665.3	Quitman	Quitman	junction with South Georgia Railroad (SOU)
AN 672.1		Dixie	originally Groover
AN 674.6		Pidcock	original junction with Georgia Northern Railway (SOU)
AN 679.3	Boston	Boston	junction with Georgia Northern Railway (SOU)
AN 691.5	Thomasville	Thomasville	rebuilt in 1914 junction with: Monticello Branch; South Georgia and Florida Railroad (SF&W); Tifton, Thomasville and Gulf Railway (ACL); Florida Central Railroad (ACL)
AN 705.6		Cairo	junction with Pelham and Havana Railroad
AN 712.6		Whigham	
AN 719.0	Climax	Climax	junction with Chattahoochee Branch
AN 728.9	Bainbridge	Bainbridge	continues as Alabama Midland Railway (Plant) junction with Georgia Florida and Alabama Railway (SAL) and Bainbridge Northern Railway

Florida Division

State	Milepost	City/Location	Station	Connections and notes
GA	AR 622.3	Dupont	Dupont	junction with main line originally Lawton
GA	AR 632.5		Haylow	originally Forrest junction with: Atlantic, Valdosta and Western Railway (SOU); Statenville Railway
GA		Statenville	Statenville	
FL	AR 654.5	Jasper	Jasper	junction with Georgia Southern and Florida Railway (SOU)
FL			Suwanee	
FL	AR 670.5	Live Oak	Live Oak	continues as Live Oak and Rowland's Bluff Railroad (Plant) junction with: Pensacola and Georgia Railroad (SAL); Live Oak and Perry Railroad; Florida Railway

Chattahoochee Branch

State	Milepost	City/Location	Station	Connections and notes
GA	ANE 719.1	Climax	Climax	junction with Main Line
GA	ANE 721.1		Otisca	
GA			Eleanor	
GA	ANE 727.7		Fowlstown	junction with Georgia Florida and Alabama Railroad (SAL)
GA			Stricklands	
GA	ANE 734.4		Faceville	
GA	ANE 740.5		Recovery	
FL	ANE 749.4	Chattahoochee	Chattahoochee	
FL		Chattahoochee	River Junction	junction with: Pensacola and Atlantic Railroad (L&N); Apalachicola Northern Railroad; Florida Central and Western Railroad (FC&P/SAL)

Monticello Branch

State	Milepost	City/Location	Station	Connections and notes
GA	AND 691.6	Thomasville	Thomasville	junction with Main Line
GA	AND 701.5	Metcalfe	Metcalfe	
FL	AND 704.2		Fincher	
FL	AND 710.7		Alma	
FL	AND 714.7	Monticello	Monticello	continues as Perry Cutoff (ACL) junction with Florida Central and Western Railroad Monticello Branch (FC&P/SAL)

== Steamship lines ==
Associated with the railroad were the Plant Steamship Line and Canada Atlantic and Plant Steamship Co., Ltd., both with Henry B. Plant as chief officer. The Tampa based steamships served Cuba by way of Key West, Mobile, Alabama, and two local routes. The Canada Atlantic and Plant Steamship Co., Ltd., with no direct company terminal as at Tampa, served Boston and Canadian points at Halifax, Cape Breton, and Prince Edward Island. Advertising touted "Plant Steamship Line — Ships ply between the ports of 3 great nations: United States (Port Tampa, Key West, Mobile, Boston), England (Dominion of Canada), Spain (Cuba)."

== See also ==
- Robert G. Erwin, successor of Plant as president of the system
- SS Mascotte
