= Folkston, Georgia =

City in Georgia, United States

- City
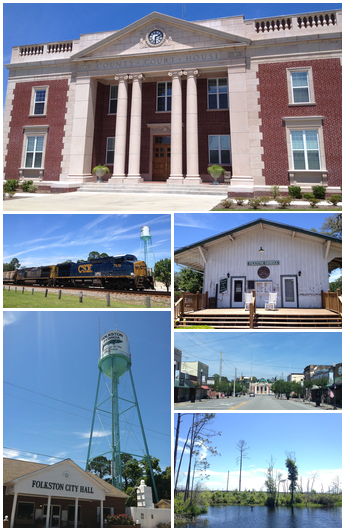
- Top, left to right: Charlton County Courthouse, Folkston Funnel, Folkston Train Museum, City Hall, Downtown Folkston, Okefenokee Swamp

- Logo
- Motto: "Gateway to the Okefenokee"
- Location in Charlton County and the state of Georgia
- Coordinates: 30°50′4″N 82°0′17″W
- Country: United States
- State: Georgia
- Counties: Charlton

Government
  - Mayor: Lee Gowen
  - City Manager: Leonard H. Lloyd

Area
  - Total: 4.19 sq mi (10.86 km^{2})
  - Land: 4.19 sq mi (10.86 km^{2})
  - Water: 0 sq mi (0.00 km^{2})

Population (2020)
  - Total: 4,464
  - Density: 1,065.0/sq mi (411.21/km^{2})
- Time zone: UTC-5 (Eastern (EST))
  - Summer (DST): UTC-4 (EDT)
- ZIP code: 31537
- Area code: 912
- FIPS code
- GNIS feature ID
- Website: https://www.cityoffolkston-ga.gov/

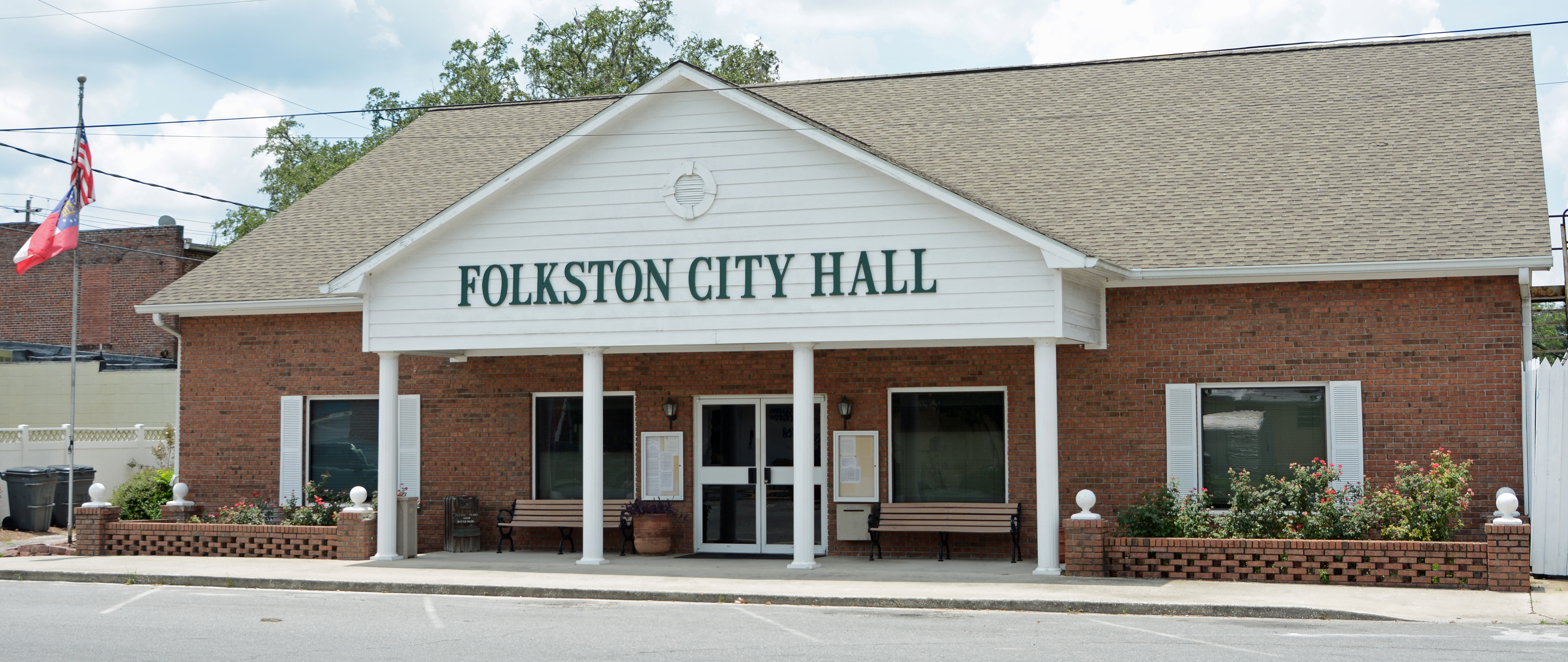
City Hall

Folkston is a city in and the county seat of Charlton County, Georgia, United States. The population was 4,464 in 2020.

The largest employer in Folkston is a GEO Group-operated ICE detention center with 3,000 beds.

== History ==
Folkston was founded on August 19, 1911. The city was named in honor of William Brandon Folks, M.D., a prominent physician and surgeon in his day. In the years 1925 through 1927, many new and commodious residences were built and several modern brick buildings were erected, including the Citizen Bank Block, the Masonic Temple building, a grammar school building, and a courthouse. Shortly after its creation, the village of Folkston was incorporated as a town government and functioned as a town until 1911 when the area was incorporated as a city. For a number of years, Folkston was the self-proclaimed "Marriage Capital of the World"; Floridians who could not endure their state's waiting period before tying the knot would cross the state line to wed.

== Geography ==
U.S. Routes 1, 23, and 301 pass through the city as Second Street, leading south 2 miles to the state line. Route 1 and 23 lead northwest 35 miles (56 km) to Waycross, while Route 301 leads north 30 miles (48 km) to Nahunta. The eastern entrance to the Okefenokee National Wildlife Refuge is 11 miles (18 km) southwest of Folkston via GA 23 and GA 121, which turned east onto Main Street until the bridge over the junction between the CSX Nahunta and Jesup Subdivisions were built in 1996.

According to the United States Census Bureau, Folkston has a total area of 4.2 square miles (10.9 km^{2}), all land.

=== Climate ===
Folkston has a humid subtropical climate (Köppen: Cfa) with long, hot summers and short, mild winters.

Climate data for Folkston (normals 1991–2020, extremes 1892–2018, 2024–present)
Month	Jan	Feb	Mar	Apr	May	Jun	Jul	Aug	Sep	Oct	Nov	Dec	Year
Record high °F (°C)	84 (29)	87 (31)	95 (35)	97 (36)	103 (39)	104 (40)	106 (41)	104 (40)	100 (38)	96 (36)	93 (34)	86 (30)	106 (41)
Mean maximum °F (°C)	79.7 (26.5)	82.4 (28.0)	87.0 (30.6)	91.3 (32.9)	95.8 (35.4)	98.9 (37.2)	99.8 (37.7)	99.1 (37.3)	96.0 (35.6)	90.7 (32.6)	86.0 (30.0)	81.0 (27.2)	100.6 (38.1)
Mean daily maximum °F (°C)	66.6 (19.2)	70.2 (21.2)	76.3 (24.6)	82.7 (28.2)	88.4 (31.3)	92.6 (33.7)	94.4 (34.7)	93.2 (34.0)	89.5 (31.9)	82.6 (28.1)	74.7 (23.7)	68.4 (20.2)	81.6 (27.6)
Daily mean °F (°C)	55.2 (12.9)	58.4 (14.7)	63.6 (17.6)	69.7 (20.9)	76.1 (24.5)	81.5 (27.5)	83.6 (28.7)	83.0 (28.3)	79.6 (26.4)	71.9 (22.2)	63.2 (17.3)	57.4 (14.1)	70.3 (21.3)
Mean daily minimum °F (°C)	43.7 (6.5)	46.5 (8.1)	50.9 (10.5)	56.7 (13.7)	63.8 (17.7)	70.4 (21.3)	72.7 (22.6)	72.9 (22.7)	69.7 (20.9)	61.1 (16.2)	51.7 (10.9)	46.3 (7.9)	58.9 (14.9)
Mean minimum °F (°C)	23.1 (−4.9)	26.9 (−2.8)	31.9 (−0.1)	40.2 (4.6)	49.9 (9.9)	61.1 (16.2)	66.3 (19.1)	66.5 (19.2)	58.7 (14.8)	42.3 (5.7)	32.0 (0.0)	28.1 (−2.2)	21.4 (−5.9)
Record low °F (°C)	5 (−15)	8 (−13)	21 (−6)	30 (−1)	38 (3)	46 (8)	56 (13)	60 (16)	43 (6)	32 (0)	19 (−7)	10 (−12)	5 (−15)
Average precipitation inches (mm)	3.83 (97)	3.37 (86)	3.73 (95)	3.50 (89)	3.28 (83)	6.96 (177)	7.07 (180)	7.76 (197)	5.59 (142)	3.41 (87)	1.89 (48)	2.77 (70)	53.16 (1,351)
Average precipitation days (≥ 0.1 in)	5.6	5.1	5.3	4.5	4.7	9.1	10.2	10.1	7.4	4.4	3.0	4.7	74.1
Source: NOAA

== Demographics ==
Historical population
Census	Pop.	Note	%±
1900	167		—
1910	355		112.6%
1920	397		11.8%
1930	506		27.5%
1940	1,024		102.4%
1950	1,515		47.9%
1960	1,810		19.5%
1970	2,112		16.7%
1980	2,243		6.2%
1990	2,285		1.9%
2000	2,178		−4.7%
2010	2,502		14.9%
2020	4,464		78.4%
U.S. Decennial Census; 1850-1870 1870-1880; 1890-1910 1920-1930; 1940 1950 1960; 1970 1980 1990; 2000 2010

=== 2020 census ===
As of the 2020 census, Folkston had a population of 4,464. The median age was 39.3 years. 11.6% of residents were under the age of 18 and 9.6% were 65 years of age or older. For every 100 females there were 289.5 males, and for every 100 females age 18 and over there were 341.1 males age 18 and over.

0.0% of residents lived in urban areas, while 100.0% lived in rural areas.

There were 865 households in Folkston, including 667 family households. Of all households, 33.4% had children under the age of 18 living in them. Of all households, 33.8% were married-couple households, 20.6% were households with a male householder and no spouse or partner present, and 41.2% were households with a female householder and no spouse or partner present. About 32.8% of all households were made up of individuals, and 12.6% had someone living alone who was 65 years of age or older. There were 1,002 housing units, of which 13.7% were vacant. The homeowner vacancy rate was 2.0% and the rental vacancy rate was 8.3%.

Folkston racial composition as of 2020
Race	Num.	Perc.
White (non-Hispanic)	1,088	24.37%
Black or African American (non-Hispanic)	1,309	29.32%
Native American	11	0.25%
Asian	80	1.79%
Other/Mixed	86	1.93%
Hispanic or Latino	1,890	42.34%

== Attractions ==
With a high percentage of rail traffic headed to Florida passing through Folkston, the rail lines through the city have acquired the nickname "The Folkston Funnel." To provide for a safe viewing situation, the city has built a platform for visitors, along with picnic tables, chairs, barbecue pits, restrooms, grills, and even WiFi. At night, lights shine onto the double track if someone wanted to watch after sunset. Freight trains from CSX and Norfolk Southern among others pass through the Folkston Funnel, and proceed to terminals such as Jacksonville, Tampa, and Miami. Freight trains that originate in Florida take the same routes in opposite direction. In addition, Amtrak trains pass through the Folkston Funnel, they do not stop there. At the covered viewing platform, there is an active scanner running and visitors can listen to train engineers.

== Education ==
=== Charlton County School District ===
The Charlton County School District holds grades pre-school to grade twelve. It consists of three elementary schools and a high school.

- Folkston Elementary School (named after the city of Folkston) - Pre-K to 4th grade
- Bethune Middle School (named after Mary McLeod Bethune) - 5th to 8th grade
- St. George Elementary School (located in St. George, not inside the city of Folkston)
- Charlton County High School (named after Charlton County) - 9th to 12th grade

== Notable people ==
- Champ Bailey, Pro Football Hall of Fame cornerback of the National Football League
- Boss Bailey, linebacker who played in the National Football League, born in Folkston
- Eldridge Milton, former NFL football linebacker for the Chicago Bears and his collegiate years at Clemson University was the first person from Folkston to play in the NFL.
- Larry Smith Jr., former NFL career with the Jacksonville Jaguars and Green Bay Packers, played at the Florida State University.
- Courtney Williams - WNBA shooting guard for the Minnesota Lynx
