= Brunswick and Western Railroad =

Historic railroad in southern Georgia

- Route of Brunswick and Western Railroad shown in red. Original alignment (Brunswick and Florida Railroad) to Glenmore shown in dark red.

Overview
- Locale: Southern Georgia
- Successor: Plant System; Atlantic Coast Line Railroad; Seaboard Coast Line Railroad

The Brunswick and Western Railroad (known earlier as the Brunswick and Florida Railroad and the Brunswick and Albany Railroad) is a historic railroad in southern Georgia that at its greatest extent ran from Brunswick near the coast to Albany. Segments of the line still exist today. The Brunswick and Florida Railroad ran from Brunswick west to Glenmore (located about 10 miles west of present-day Waycross), where it would connect with the Atlantic and Gulf Railroad.

== History ==
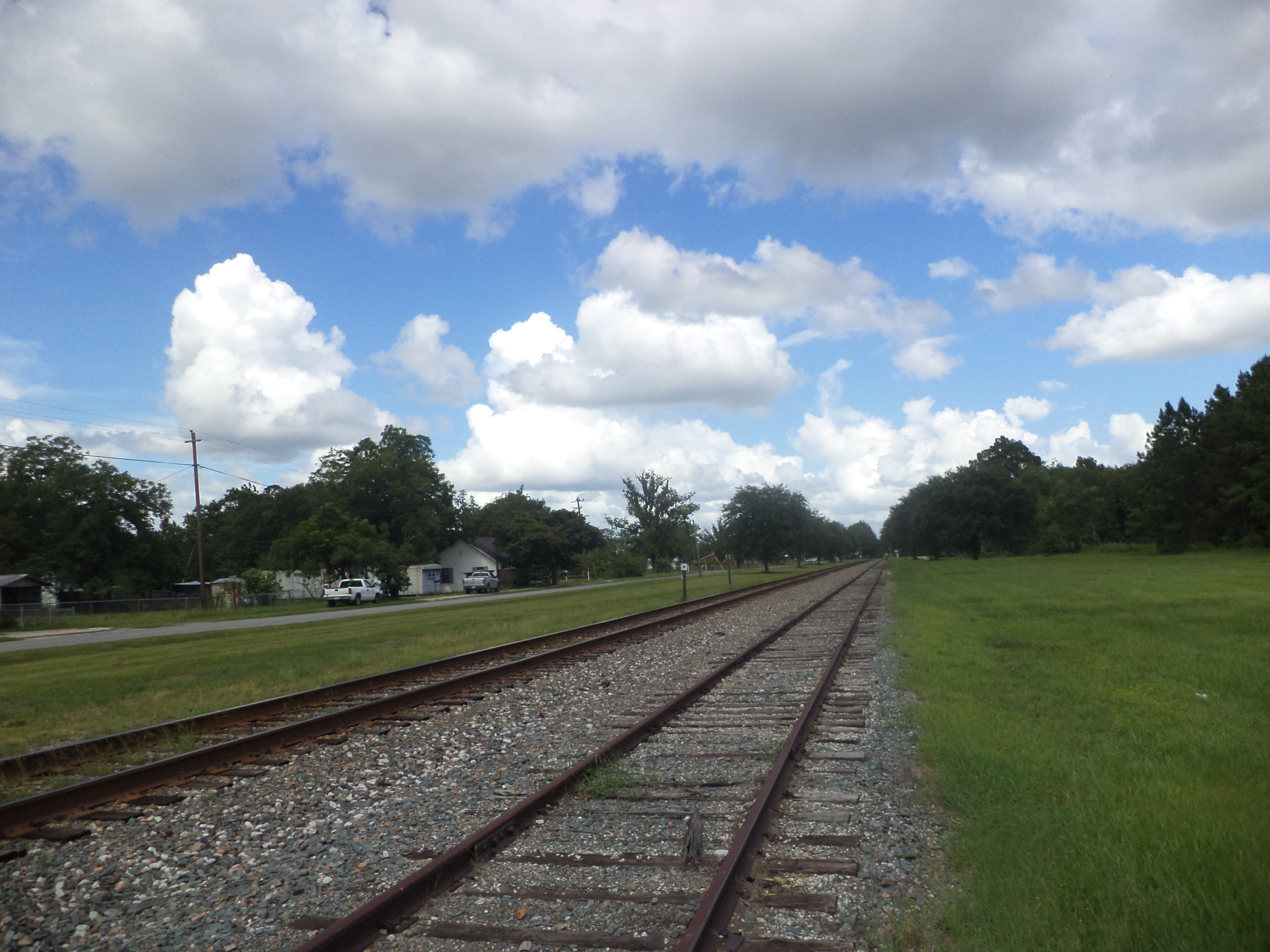
The former Brunswick and Western Railroad in Hoboken, Georgia as seen in 2013

In the 1830s, a railroad route from North Florida through South Georgia and onwards to the Atlantic coast was the goal of several different competing companies. The route was desired due to the growth of cotton production in the area and the lack of navigable rivers through the area. The head of navigation on the Flint River was at Albany, Georgia, the center of cotton trade in the region; however, the Flint River was relatively small and Apalachicola Bay lacked a decent harbor. There were two major ports on Georgia's Atlantic coast at the time: Brunswick and Savannah.

The Brunswick and Florida Railroad received its charter from the Georgia General Assembly on December 22, 1835. Their charter allowed them to select a route between Brunswick, Georgia and the Florida line, and forbade another route from existing with 20 miles (32 km) of their own.

Before any rails were laid by the company, they were already planning on branch routes. In November 1836, a bill was introduced to the Georgia legislature to authorize the Brunswick and Florida Railroad to construct a branch to the Flint or Chattahoochee Rivers. That bill became law on December 24, 1836. By July 1837, an initial survey of the route has been completed. The end of the route was going to be near the confluence of the Flint and Chattahoochee Rivers on the Florida-Georgia line.

The company spent the late 1830s attempting to raise funding for the railroad. In the summer of 1838, Thomas Butler King, then the president of the company, toured South Georgia and was able to raise $80,000 in stock subscriptions from the citizens of Lowndes County, Georgia and $220,000 from the citizens of Thomas County, Georgia.

No progress was made for over a decade, but by 1852 efforts were once again being made to get the railroad started. As part of the renewed effort, a line from Troupville, Georgia to Albany, Georgia was being planned. Construction was finally set to start on November 1, 1852. By June 1853, 12 miles of the route had been graded with 5.5 miles of rail laid.

=== Brunswick versus Savannah ===
In February 1854, the Savannah and Albany Railroad Company rebranded themselves the Savannah, Albany, and Gulf Railroad through a new charter from the state and began plans for a Florida route, a route that was forbidden by the Brunswick and Florida Railroad's charter. By April 1854, citizens in South Georgia were hoping that the two companies would avoid competition with one another and construct a "main trunk" line together. In February 1855, Col. Charles L. Schlatter arrived in Georgia to take over the role as chief engineer for the construction of the railroad. Col. Schlatter was an accomplished and eminent civil engineer, who in early life was chief engineer of the state of Pennsylvania and of the Ogdensburg Railroad of New York. Col. Schlatter is the namesake of Schlatterville, Georgia which is located just west of Hoboken. The directors' report from May 1855, detailed the conditions of the company. 20 miles of the route had then been graded and 5 miles of rail laid. The company owned one locomotive and six freight cars.

In November 1855, a bill was introduced to the Georgia General Assembly by Alexander Lawton to give the Savannah, Albany, and Gulf's southern branch line the right to cross the line of the Brunswick and Florida, but it did not pass. In early 1856, a compromise was reached between the two competing companies was passed by the Georgia General Assembly. They would both build to a certain point in south Georgia, and then a main trunk line was to be built. The company chartered to build that line was incorporated as the Atlantic and Gulf Railroad Company in February 1856. Construction of the Atlantic and Gulf was forbidden until the junction of the Brunswick and Florida Railroad and the Savannah, Albany, and Gulf Railroad. At that time the Brunswick and Florida had only completed the first 32 miles (51 km) of its line.

Members of the Brunswick and Florida Railroad Company also met in December 1856 to discuss the changes to the charter made by the Georgia legislature. They recommended that their company refuse to junction with or surrender charter privileges to the Atlantic and Gulf Company unless it was beneficial to the development of the city of Brunswick. They also wanted the junction, if it was to take place, to be located east of the Satilla River. The Brunswick and Florida Railroad Company was still busy in April 1857 trying to get the citizen of Lowndes and Berrien counties on their side and claimed that $40,000 in stock had been raised in Lowndes County alone.

By October 1857, the route had been graded to Big Creek in modern Brantley County, but the company lacked the iron to complete the line to that point. By November 1858, additional rails were purchased to complete the railroad to its junction with the Atlantic and Gulf and extension of the road to Albany was being called for.

A route from Albany to railroad's junction with the Atlantic and Gulf was surveyed in April 1859 by chief engineer Charles L. Schlatter. The company's intention to build a route to Albany was announced a few weeks later. Grading of the route from the junction with the Atlantic and Gulf to Waresboro, Georgia began in August 1860.

=== Civil War ===
Construction of the railroad continued during the American Civil War. The route from Brunswick to Teabeauville was complete by late August 1861. By that point in time the Atlantic and Gulf Railroad had already been completed to Thomasville, Georgia. The Brunswick and Florida original route called for it to go through Thomasville on its way to Florida. In September 1861, Charles Lyon Schlatter Sr was elected president of the railroad company. At the same meeting, it was decided to change the name of the railroad to the Brunswick and Albany Railroad. The name change was made official by the legislature during that December.

On June 10, 1863, two Union gunboats went up the Turtle River and attempted to burn the Brunswick and Albany Railroad's trestle of Buffalo Swamp. The fire was put out by some carpenters after the gunboats left.

In late 1863, the government of the Confederate States of America took much of the Brunswick and Florida's track and used it to complete the connection between the Atlantic and Gulf Railroad's main route to the Florida, Atlantic and Gulf Central Railroad. The new route from Du Pont, Georgia to Live Oak, Florida was the first railroad to connect the states of Florida and Georgia.

=== Brunswick and Albany Railroad ===
The name change was reaffirmed in 1866 by the new government after the end of the Civil War. After the war in 1869, the State of Georgia provided about $6 million in bonds for the railroad to rebuild.

Rebuilding of the railroad commenced in August 1869, with track being laid all the way to Waynesville, Georgia by 24 November 1869. On January 25, 1870, the rails were complete to the east bank of the Satilla River, and by March 10, 1870, the track was once again complete to Big Creek at the 47.5 mile post. The westernmost segment of the original line from Schlatterville to Glenmore was never rebuilt, instead, the line from Schlatterville to Albany became the only online line.

In May 1870, rails had once again been laid up the junction with the Atlantic and Gulf Railroad at Tebeauville.

By January 1871, the construction crew had laid rails all the way to Alapaha River near modern Alapaha, Georgia. Before the road had even reached Albany, the company was thinking of extending the route to Eufaula, Alabama. Surveys for the route west from Albany began in March 1871. Track laying reached the Little River near what would soon become Tifton in April of that same year. Only 30 miles were left between Albany and the completed line by July 1871. Work on grading the line from Albany to Cuthbert and on to Eufaula was set to begin in June 1871, when many plantation owners along the line began demanding damage payments for allowing the railroad a right of way through their land. The railroad refused to pay any damages to the owners and permanently suspended construction of the line west of Cuthbert. The first train reached Albany from Brunswick on October 2, 1871.

Shortly after the railroad's completion to Albany, the railroad fail upon hard financial times and was unable to pay the contractors and workers involved with the construction of the railroad. This led to the governor of Georgia intervening due to state bonds that had been used to fund the construction of the railroad. The Atlantic and Gulf began running thrice-weekly trains from to Albany from the Brunswick and Albany's junction with its own line in late November.

While the lawsuits regarding the finances of the companies were being contested, new communities began to grow along the route of the railroad. In April 1872, Col. Nelson Tift established a sawmill settlement at the crossroads of the Brunswick and Florida Railroad and the Union Road. The next month a post office was established near the Alapaha River along the line called Allapaha. In October 1873, in order to settle the debts of the railroad it was sold to German investors.

In 1882, the line's name would change again to the Brunswick and Western Railroad.

=== Atlantic Coast Line and later years ===
Albany–Waycross Line Waycross–Brunswick Line

Overview
- Status: Some segments still operating
- Owner: Atlantic Coast Line Railroad (1902–1967); Seaboard Coast Line Railroad (1967–1986)
- Locale: Southeast Georgia

Technical
- Track gauge: 1,435 mm (4 ft 8 1/2 in) standard gauge

The Atlantic and Gulf Railroad was bought by Henry B. Plant in 1879. It was renamed the Savannah, Florida and Western Railway and would become the main line of the Plant System. The Brunswick and Western Railroad was purchased by the Plant System in 1888 and was fully integrated into the system by 1901. In 1902, the entire Plant System was bought by the Atlantic Coast Line Railroad. The Atlantic Coast Line continued to operate the Brunswick and Western as line as their Albany–Waycross Line (P Line) west of Waycross and as their Waycross–Brunswick Line (O Line) east of Waycross.

The Albany–Waycross Line was the busier segment of the line under the Atlantic Coast Line's ownership. Passenger trains including the City of Miami, Dixie Flyer, Flamingo, Seminole, and South Wind ran the line from Albany to Waycross on their way from the Midwest to Florida. By 1949, the Albany–Waycross Line had three passenger trains and two through freight trains round-trip daily with an additional local freight train running six days a week. At the same time, the Waycross–Brunswick Line had only one local freight train from Waycross to Brunswick six days a week. The Southern Railway also had trackage rights from Southern Junction to Brunswick.

The Atlantic Coast Line became the Seaboard Coast Line Railroad in 1967 after merging with their former rival, the Seaboard Air Line Railroad. The Seaboard Coast Line adopted the Seaboard Air Line's method of naming their lines as subdivisions. As a result, the line was named the Albany Subdivision west of Waycross to Albany and the Brunswick Subdivision east of Waycross. The City of Miami and the Seminole continued to operate on the Albany Subdivision after the merger. Though passenger service was discontinued in 1971 after the Seaboard Coast Line's passenger services were taken over by Amtrak.

In 1980, the Seaboard Coast Line's parent company merged with the Chessie System, creating the CSX Corporation. The CSX Corporation initially operated the Chessie and Seaboard Systems separately until 1986, when they were merged into CSX Transportation. Within the decade, the company abandoned the Albany Subdivision between Sylvester and Pearson.

== Current conditions ==
Today, the Brunswick and Western Railroad still exists today in segments.

=== Brunswick Subdivision ===
The most notable segment of the line still in service is from Waycross to Brunswick which is still operating as CSX's Brunswick Subdivision. At its northwest end it connects to the Jesup Subdivision in Waycross just east of Rice Yard. Though, track in Brunswick from Southern Junction to CSX's current Brunswick Yard was part of the former Brunswick and Birmingham Railroad. The Brunswick Subdivision was still not heavily used into the 2000s and only saw about two trains a day. As of early 2023, CSX completed a new connection from the Brunswick Subdivision to the A Line at Nahunta. This was done to take pressure off of the Jesup Subdivision by providing an additional route for trains from Waycross to access the Nahunta Subdivision. Continuous welded rail and a centralized traffic control signal system were also installed from Waycross to Nahunta to manage the additional traffic from this new connection.

=== West of Waycross ===
The short section of Brunswick and Western Railroad track between the Jesup Subdivision and the Fitzgerald Subdivision has been abandoned.

The remaining line from Waycross west to Pearson is now operating as CSX's Pearson Spur.

In 1991, CSX sold the remaining line from Sylvester to Albany to Gulf and Ohio Railways subsidiary Atlantic and Gulf Railroad (not to be confused with the original Atlantic and Gulf Railroad that preceded the Plant System). In 1999, the Sylvester to Albany segment was sold again to the short line Georgia and Florida Railway who operates it today.

== Historic stations ==
Milepost	City/Location	Station	Connections and notes
AP 699.4	Albany	Albany	junction with: Atlantic and Gulf Railroad Albany Division (SF&W/ACL); Columbus Southern Railway (SAL); Georgia Northern Railway (SOU); Georgia Southwestern and Gulf Railroad
AP 698.1	Albany	East Albany	
AP 696.6		Darrow	
AP 689.4	Acree	Acree	also known as Davis
AP 683.9		Willingham	
AP 679.7	Sylvester	Sylvester	junction with Georgia, Ashburn, Sylvester and Camilla Railway (SOU)
AP 676.4	Poulan	Poulan	
AP 673.1	Sumner	Sumner	
AP 667.5	Ty Ty	Ty Ty	
AP 661.1		Hillsdale	
AP 658.4	Tifton	Tifton	junction with: Georgia Southern and Florida Railway (SOU); Tifton and Northeastern Railroad (AB&A/ACL); Tifton, Thomasville and Gulf Railway (AB&A/ACL)
AP 651.3	Brookfield	Brookfield	
AP 647.1	Enigma	Enigma	
AP 641.1	Alapaha	Alapaha	
AP 635.2	Glory	Glory	
AP 629.0	Willacoochee	Willacoochee	junction with Augusta and Florida Railway (G&F)
AP 627.9		Pine Bloom	
AP 626.2		Leliaton	
AP 620.9	Kirkland	Kirkland	
AP 617.5	Pearson	Pearson	
AP 610.7	Axson	Axson	once known as McDonald's Mill
AP 606.7	Millwood	Millwood	
AP 603.7	Fairfax	Fairfax	
AP 601.1		Hasty	
AP 599.4		Sappville	
AP 595.7	Waresboro	Waresboro	
AP 587.1; AO 587.1 (Note: The milepost numbers along the line put in place by the Atlantic Coast Line originate in Waycross and continue from the former Savannah, Florida and Western Railroad. The numbers increase in each direction from Waycross.)	Waycross	Waycross	junction with: Savannah, Florida and Western Railway (ACL); Waycross and Florida Railroad (SF&W/ACL); Waycross Air Line Railroad (AB&A/ACL)
AO 593.4		Colgan’s Still	
AO 597.2		Schlatterville	
AO 601.1	Hoboken	Hoboken	
AO 609.9	Nahunta	Nahunta	junction with the Folkston Cutoff (SF&W/ACL)
AO 614.8		Lulaton	
AO 618.2		Atkinson	
AO 621.7	Waynesville	Waynesville	
AO 627.1	Bladen	Bladen	junction with Florida Central and Peninsular Railroad Northern Division (SAL)
AO 630.6	Jamaica	Jamaica	
AO 633.1	Anguilla	Anguilla	junction with Colonel's Island Railroad
AO 636.0		Pyles Marsh	
AO 639.0	Brunswick	Southern Junction	junction with: Macon and Brunswick Railroad (SOU); Brunswick and Birmingham Railroad (AB&C/ACL)
AO 641.5	Dock Junction	Dock Junction	originally Arco
AO 647.1	Brunswick	Brunswick	

== Company presidents ==
=== Brunswick and Florida Railroad ===
- Thomas Butler King (1836-1840s)
- Solomon Foote (1851-)
- Henry S. Welles (1855)
- C. F. Welles Jr (1856,
- Stephen Clay King (1856)
- C. F. Welles Jr (1857)
- Samuel J. Beales (1857)
- Henry S. Welles (1857)
- H. G. Wheeler (1858-1861)
- Charles Lyon Schlatter Sr (1861-1863)

=== Brunswick and Albany Railroad ===
- Charles Lyon Schlatter Sr (1863-)
- Hannibal Kimball (1870-1871)
