= Manchester Subdivision =

Railway line in Georgia, USA

The Manchester Subdivision is a railroad line currently operated by CSX Transportation in Central Georgia. Its northern terminus is in Peachtree City (a suburb of Atlanta), where it continues south from the Atlanta Terminal Subdivision. From Peachtree City, it runs for 38.8 miles (62.4 km) south to Manchester, Georgia, where it connects with CSX's Lineville Subdivision and Fitzgerald Subdivision. It is a major north–south route for CSX in Georgia.

== History ==
The Manchester Subdivision was built in 1906 by the Atlanta, Birmingham and Atlantic Railway (AB&A). In 1926, the AB&A went into receivership and the Atlantic Coast Line Railroad (ACL) purchased a majority stock in the AB&A. The Atlantic Coast Line reorganized the AB&A as the Atlanta, Birmingham and Coast Railroad (AB&C) and continued to operate it as a separate company.

The Atlanta, Birmingham and Coast Railroad operated passenger service on the line from Atlanta, which continued south on the AB&C network to Waycross, Brunswick, and Thomasville. From January 1936, the line was a link in the route of the Dixieland, which ran in the winter season only, with the AB&C carrying coaches and Pullmans between Atlanta and Waycross on its route from Chicago to Miami. Beginning in January 1940, the line also carried the Dixie Flagler, a streamlined all-coach train, daily on its route between Chicago and Miami.

In 1946, the Atlantic Coast Line fully absorbed the AB&C and it became their Western Division. The Atlantic Coast Line became the Seaboard Coast Line Railroad (SCL) in 1967 after merging with their rival, the Seaboard Air Line Railroad (SAL). The Seaboard Coast Line adopted the Seaboard Air Line's method of naming their lines as subdivisions which resulted in the line from Atlanta to Manchester being named the Manchester Subdivision.

In 1980, the Seaboard Coast Line's parent company merged with the Chessie System, creating the CSX Corporation. The CSX Corporation initially operated the Chessie and Seaboard Systems separately until 1986, when they were merged into CSX Transportation. CSX subsequently truncated the Manchester Subdivision designation at Peachtree City and redesignated the line north of there to Atlanta as the Atlanta Terminal Subdivision as it is today. The line continues to be a major freight route for CSX.

== Historic stations ==
Manchester to Atlanta
Milepost	City/Location	Station	Connections and notes
ANB 788.1	Manchester	Manchester	
ANB 792.7		Persico	
ANB 797.9	Woodbury	Woodbury	
ANB 802.0		Imlac	
ANB 806.7	Gay	Gay	
ANB 812.4		Alvaton	
ANB 817.0	Haralson	Haralson	
ANB 822.2	Senoia	Senoia	
ANB 827.6	Peachtree City	Peachtree City	
ANB 830.7	Peachtree City	Aberdeen	
ANB 835.3	Tyrone	Tyrone	
ANB 841.3		Fife	
ANB 844.4	Union City	Union City	
ANB 847.9		Dungannon	
ANB 853.7	Atlanta	Ben Hill	
ANB 855.6	Atlanta	Fulco Junction	junction with Fulton County Railway
ANB 858.4	Atlanta	Stratford	
ANB 862.3	Atlanta	South Bellwood	junction with Louisville & Nashville Railroad
	Atlanta	Terminal Station	used until 1930
	Atlanta	Union station	used after 1930

== See also ==
- List of CSX Transportation lines
- Atlanta, Birmingham and Atlantic Railroad
