= Albany—Thomasville Line =

Atlantic Coast Line Railroad line in Southern Georgia

Overview
- Other name: Pelham Subdivision
- Status: Still operating
- Owner: Atlantic Coast Line Railroad (1902–1967); Seaboard Coast Line Railroad (1967–1986); CSX Transportation (1986-1991); Gulf and Ohio Railways (1991-1999); Georgia and Florida Railway (1999-present)

Technical
- Track gauge: 1,435 mm (4 ft 8 1/2 in) standard gauge
- Electrification: No

The Atlantic Coast Line Railroad's Albany—Thomasville Line was a historic railroad line in southern Georgia. Built in 1869 by the company's predecessors, it carried some of the Atlantic Coast Line's passenger trains on their routes from the Midwest to the Southeastern United States. The line is still in service today and is now operated by the Georgia and Florida Railway.

== Route Description ==
The Albany—Thomasville Line ran in a mostly north–south trajectory between its namesake cities. It began in Thomasville at a junction with the Atlantic Coast Line's Waycross—Montgomery Line and Thomasville—Dunnellon Line. From Thomasville, it proceeded north and passed through Ochlocknee, Meigs, Pelham, and Baconton before reaching Albany's Union Depot.

== History ==
The track that became the Albany—Thomasville Line was chartered by the Georgia General Assembly on December 22, 1857, as the South Georgia and Florida Railroad to construct a railroad between Albany, Georgia and Thomasville, Georgia with the intent of having it continue into Florida. In 1869, construction of the line from Thomasville north to Pelham, Georgia was completed when it was sold to the Atlantic and Gulf Railroad. The Atlantic and Gulf operated an east–west line through Thomasville that ran between Savannah and Bainbridge, Georgia. After the Atlantic and Gulf bought the line, it was completed all the way to Albany within a year. The line was operated by the Atlantic and Gulf as their Albany Division.

The Atlantic and Gulf network was acquired by Henry B. Plant in November 1879 and he reorganized it as the Savannah, Florida and Western Railway (SF&W) the following month. The line from Thomasville to Albany would be the first of two Plant System lines to Albany (the other was the former Brunswick and Western Railroad, which the Plant System acquired in 1888).

The entire Plant System was acquired by the Atlantic Coast Line Railroad in 1902, and the line became one of the Atlantic Coast Line's secondary main lines. It would become a prominent route in the 1920s when the Atlantic Coast Line completed its historic Perry Cutoff, which gave the company a route from Thomasville south along Florida's west coast. Once the Perry Cutoff was complete in 1928, the line became the route of the Southland, which ran from Chicago to Florida. The Southland ran to Albany from the north via the Central of Georgia Railway, then ran south to Thomasville and continued down the Perry Cutoff. By 1949, the Southland was running the line daily along with a daily through freight train and a local freight train that ran six days a week. The Southland was discontinued in 1957.

The Atlantic Coast Line became the Seaboard Coast Line Railroad (SCL) in 1967 after merging with their rival, the Seaboard Air Line Railroad (SAL). After the merger, the line was designated the company's Pelham Subdivision with only one local freight train running six days a week.

In 1980, the Seaboard Coast Line's parent company merged with the Chessie System, creating the CSX Corporation. The CSX Corporation initially operated the Chessie and Seaboard Systems separately until 1986, when they were merged into CSX Transportation. In 1991, CSX sold the line to Gulf and Ohio Railways subsidiary Atlantic and Gulf Railroad (not to be confused with the original Atlantic and Gulf Railroad who operated the line in the 1800s). Gulf and Ohio Railways sold the line to the Georgia and Florida Railway in 1999 who operates it today.

== Historic stations ==
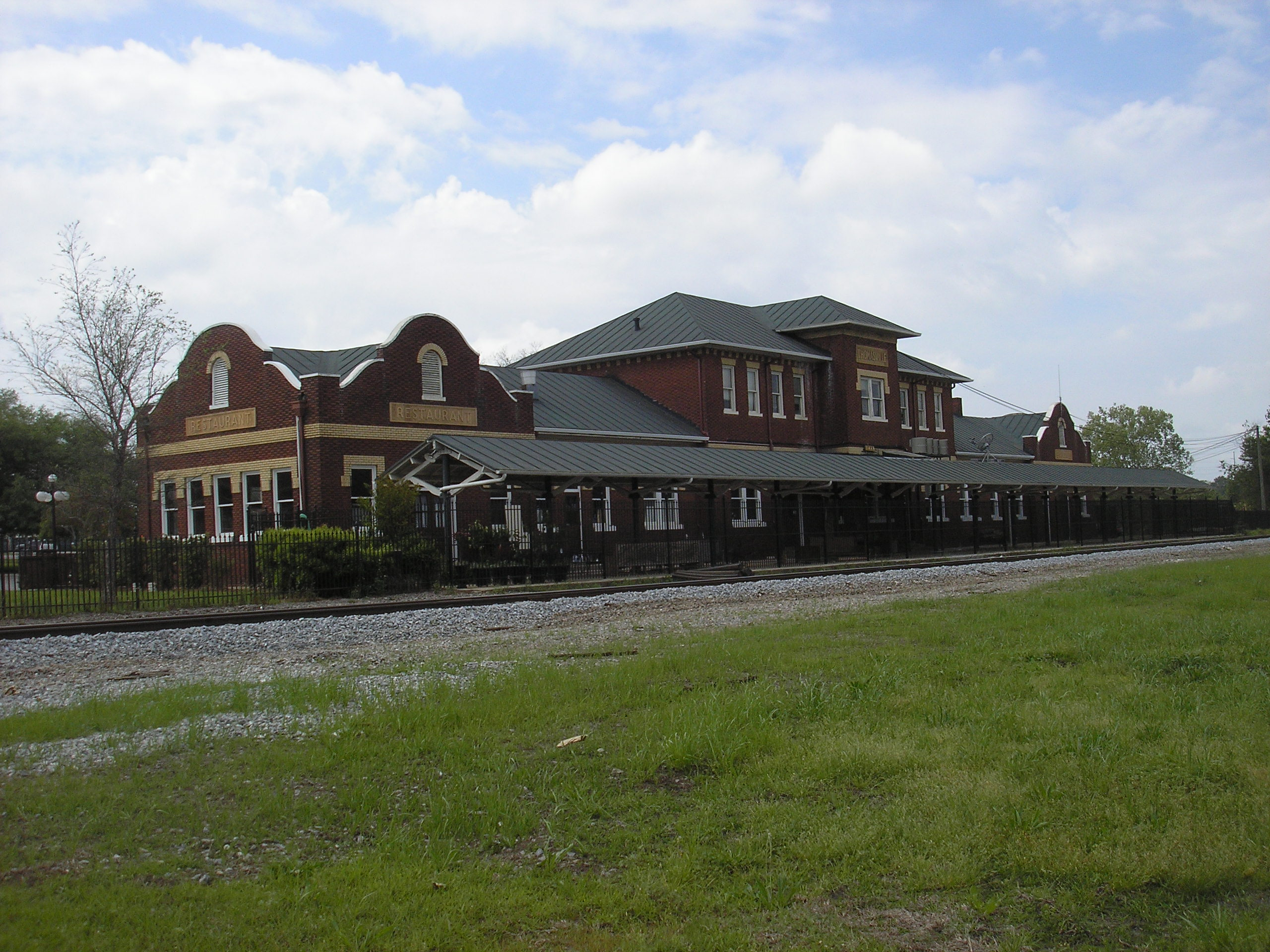
Atlantic Coast Line's Thomasville Depot

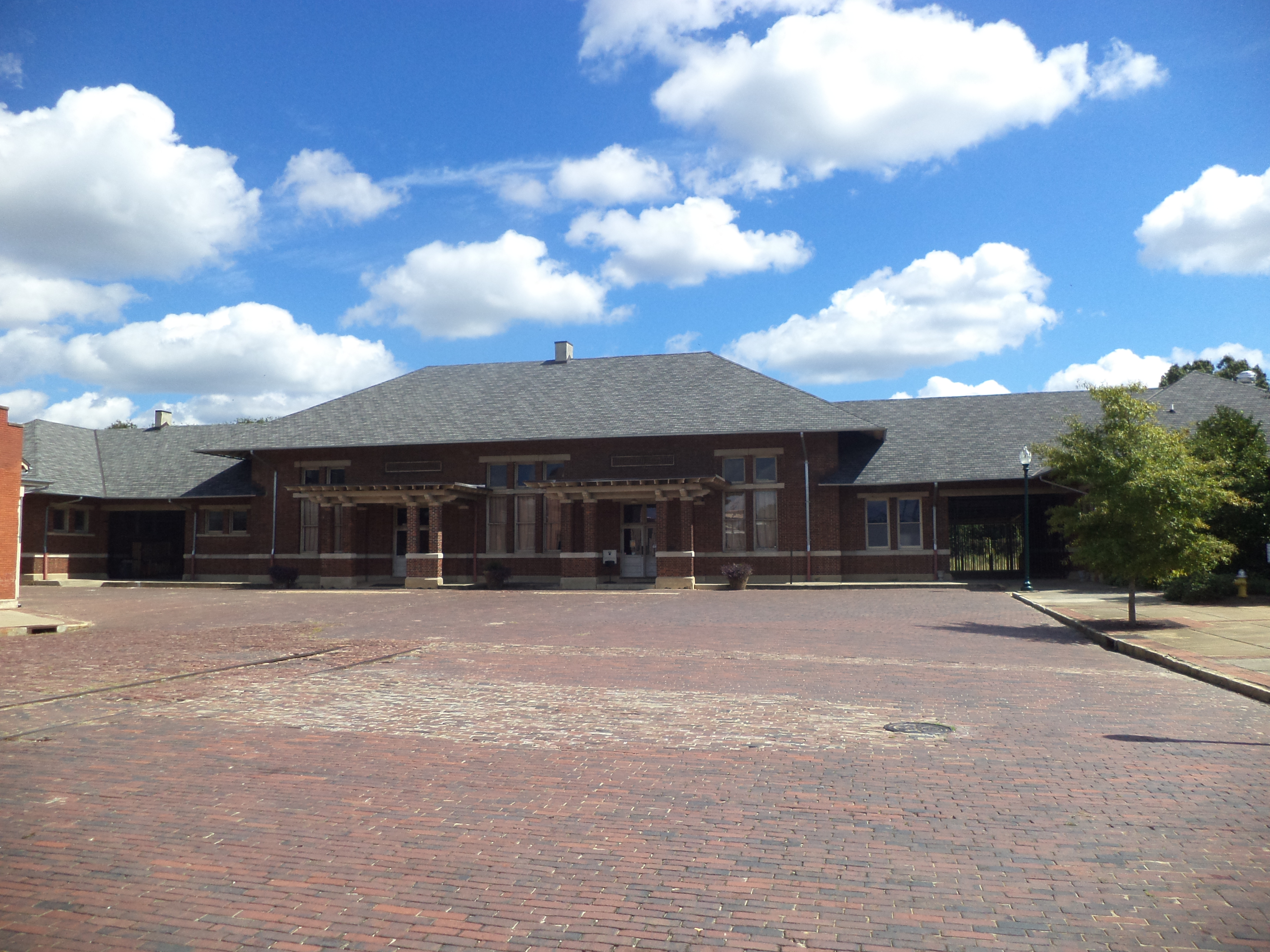
Union Station in Albany

Milepost	City/Location	Station	Connections and notes
ANC 691.5	Thomasville	Thomasville	junction with: Waycross—Montgomery Line; Thomasville—Dunellon Line; Tifton, Thomasville and Gulf Railway (AB&A/ACL)
ANC 697.4		Pasco	
ANC 703.0	Ochlocknee	Ochlocknee	
ANC 710.2	Meigs	Meigs	
ANC 715.5	Pelham	Pelham	junction with Flint River and Northeastern Railroad (SOU)
ANC 723.7	Camilla	Camilla	junction with Georgia, Ashburn, Sylvester and Camilla Railway (SOU)
ANC 729.7		Flint	
ANC 733.8	Baconton	Baconton	
ANC 741.4		Putney	
ANC 748.5	Albany	East Albany	
ANC 749.8	Albany	Albany	junction with: Brunswick and Western Railroad (SF&W/ACL); Central of Georgia Railway; Columbus Southern Railway (SAL); Albany and Northern Railway (SOU); Georgia Northern Railway (SOU)

== See also ==
- List of CSX Transportation lines
- Waycross—Montgomery Line (Atlantic Coast Line Railroad)
- Brunswick and Western Railroad
