= Tifton and Northeastern Railroad =

Overview
- Locale: Southern Georgia
- Dates of operation: 1896–1906
- Successor: Atlantic and Birmingham Railroad

Technical
- Track gauge: 4 ft 8 1/2 in (1,435 mm) (standard gauge)

The Tifton and Northeastern Railroad was a railroad running from Tifton, Georgia northeast to Fitzgerald, Georgia, a distance of 25 miles. It was built in the late 1800s and it later became part of the Atlanta, Birmingham and Atlantic Railway and Atlantic Coast Line Railroad networks.

== History ==
The Tifton and Northeastern Railroad chartered on October 15, 1891 by business interests in Tifton. The line was completed in 1896. The company's first president was Captain Henry Tift, who founded the town of Tifton and operated a sawmill there. The community of Mystic, Georgia at the north end of the line was named for Tift's hometown of Mystic, Connecticut.

Both the Tifton and Northeastern Railroad and the Tifton, Thomasville and Gulf Railway were acquired by the Atlantic and Birmingham Railroad on December 3, 1903, which was renamed the Atlantic and Birmingham Railway (A&B). This gave the Atlantic and Birmingham a continuous branch line, known as the Thomasville Branch, from Fitzgerald (where it connected to the rest of the A&B network) to Thomasville.

The Atlantic and Birmingham then became part of the Atlanta, Birmingham and Atlantic Railroad (AB&A) when it took over the A&B network on April 12, 1906. The AB&A ran daily passenger trains from Atlanta to Thomasville via Fitzgerald and Tifton on the former Tifton and Northeastern Railroad line.

The Atlanta, Birmingham and Atlantic Railroad was acquired by the Atlantic Coast Line Railroad in 1926. The Atlantic Coast Line operated the AB&A network as the Atlanta, Birmingham and Coast Railroad (AB&C) until 1946, when they fully merged the AB&C into the Atlantic Coast Line Railroad. The Atlantic Coast Line Railroad abandoned the Tifton and Northeastern Railroad in 1960.

== Historic stations ==
Milepost	City/Location	Station	Connections and notes
ANK 747.0	Tifton	Tifton	junction with: Tifton, Thomasville and Gulf Railway (AB&C/ACL); Brunswick and Western Railroad (SF&W/ACL); Georgia Southern and Florida Railway (SOU)
ANK 752.0		Brighton	
ANK 755.0		Harding	
ANK 757.0		Hansen	
ANK 761.0		Pinetta	
ANK 763.0		Mystic	
ANK 767.0		Fletcher	
ANK 772.0	Fitzgerald	Fitzgerald	junction with: Atlanta, Birmingham and Coast Railroad (ACL); Abbeville and Waycross Railroad (SAL)
