= Hawkinsville and Florida Southern Railway =

Railway in Georgia, United States

Overview
- Locale: Georgia
- Dates of operation: 1896–1922
- Successor: Georgia, Ashburn, Sylvester and Camilla Railway (Section from Camilla to Ashburn only)

Technical
- Length: 43 miles (69 km)

The Hawkinsville and Florida Southern Railway (H&FS) was founded in 1896 and by 1901 was operating 43 miles (69 km) of track from Hawkinsville to Worth, Georgia, United States, where it connected with the Georgia Southern and Florida Railroad. It also operated a 15-mile (24 km) line between Davisville and Fitzgerald, Georgia. In 1907, a portion of the H&FS was leased to the Gulf Line Railway However, in 1913, the H&FS took over operations and fully absorbed the Gulf Line resulting in a line from Hawkinsville to Camilla, Georgia. In 1922, the H&FS went bankrupt. The section from Camilla to Ashburn, Georgia, was purchased by the Georgia, Ashburn, Sylvester and Camilla Railway but no buyers could be found for the remainder of the system and it was abandoned by 1923.
