= Atlanta Terminal Subdivision =

Railway line in Atlanta, Georgia

CSX Transportation's Atlanta Terminal Subdivision comprises the company's railroad lines and infrastructure operating in and around Atlanta, Georgia. The Atlanta Terminal Subdivision consists of five lines (known as charts on employee timetables) and a number of yards. Most of the lines in the Atlanta Terminal Subdivision date back to the 1800s.

== History ==
CSX lines in Atlanta were previously part of CSX's predecessor networks including the Atlantic Coast Line Railroad, Seaboard Air Line Railroad, and Louisville and Nashville Railroad.

The Atlantic Coast Line and Seaboard Air Line merged in 1967 to form the Seaboard Coast Line Railroad. By 1982, the Louisville and Nashville Railroad was fully merged into Seaboard Coast Line Railroad, which became the Seaboard System Railroad a year later. In 1986, the Seaboard System was fully merged with the Chessie System into CSX Transportation. The lines around Atlanta were then designated as the Atlanta Terminal Subdivision by CSX after the merger was complete.

== Lines ==
The Atlanta Terminal Subdivision is divided up into five separate lines, which are denoted on employee timetables as charts.

=== Chart A ===
Chart A begins in Marietta and heads southeast into Atlanta, and then heads east to Lithonia for a total of 44.2 miles (71.1 km). At its north end it continues south from the W&A Subdivision and at its south end it continues south as the Georgia Subdivision.

Chart A from Marietta to Atlanta was originally built by the Western and Atlantic Railroad in the 1830s. Its terminus in Atlanta was located at the current site of Underground Atlanta and it was the location of the railroad's historic Atlanta Zero Mile Post. The Western and Atlantic was leased to the Nashville, Chattanooga and St. Louis Railway in 1890, which was merged into the Louisville and Nashville Railroad in 1957.

Chart A from Atlanta to Lithonia was built by the Georgia Railroad in the 1850s. In 1902, the Georgia Railroad became a subsidiary of the Atlantic Coast Line Railroad and its successor, the Seaboard Coast Line Railroad. The Georgia Railroad was fully merged into the Seaboard System Railroad in 1983.

=== Chart B ===
Chart B begins about 13 miles northeast of central Atlanta in Tucker. From Tucker, it continues northeast as the Abbeville Subdivision. As it heads into Atlanta, it passes through the middle of Emory University. In Atlanta, it passes the entrance to Howell Yard before terminating at Chart A in the Blandtown neighborhood.

Chart B was built in 1886 by the Georgia, Carolina and Northern Railway, which became part of the Seaboard Air Line Railroad network by the time it was complete. Construction on the line began in 1887 in North Carolina. The Seaboard Air Line continued beyond Howell Yard to Birmingham, Alabama, which was built by the Seaboard's subsidiary Atlanta and Birmingham Air Line Railway in the early 1900s. The Silver Comet, The Cherry Blossoms, and The Capitol were Seaboard Air Line passenger trains that ran over the line on their route from the Northeast to Atlanta and Birmingham.

Chart B was part of the Abbeville Subdivision when it was operated by the Seaboard Coast Line. CSX abandoned track the line's connection to Birmingham in 1988.

=== Chart C ===
Chart C begins about 38 miles south of Atlanta in Peachtree City. From Peachtree City, it continues south as the Manchester Subdivision. As it heads north into Atlanta, it passes through Union City and enters Atlanta city limits near Ben Hill. It terminates at Chart A just southeast of Tilford Yard.

Chart C track from Tilford to South Bellwood was built by the Atlanta, Knoxville and Northern Railway, which later became part of the Louisville and Nashville Belt Railway.

Track south of South Bellwood was built in 1906 by the Atlanta, Birmingham and Atlantic Railway (AB&A). In 1926, the AB&A went into receivership and the Atlantic Coast Line Railroad (ACL) purchased a majority stock in the AB&A. The Atlantic Coast Line reorganized the AB&A as the Atlanta, Birmingham and Coast Railroad (AB&C) and continued to operate it as a subsidiary. In 1946, it was fully merged into the Atlantic Coast Line. The line was part of the Manchester Subdivision when it was operated by the Seaboard Coast Line.

=== Chart D ===
Chart D begins about 19 miles south of Atlanta in Union City. From Union City, it continues south as the A&WP Subdivision. As it heads north into Atlanta, it runs along the west side of Hartsfield-Jackson Atlanta International Airport and continues north to East Point. In East Point, it connects with Norfolk Southern Railway Griffin District. Both CSX and Norfolk Southern continue north from East Point to central Atlanta.

Chart D south of East Point was built by the Atlanta and West Point Railroad in 1854. The Atlantic Coast Line Railroad eventually gained a controlling interest in the Atlanta and West Point Railroad. It eventually fell under the control of the Atlantic Coast Line's successor, the Seaboard Coast Line Railroad.

=== Chart E ===
Chart E is a short 3-mile line that connects Chart B at Belt Junction with Chart A near Decatur. Chart E is also known as the Inman Park Belt Line.

Chart E was developed by the Georgia, Carolina and Northern Railway as the Seaboard Air Line Belt Railroad in 1892. It was part of the Seaboard Air Line Railroad network along with the Georgia, Carolina and Northern Railway.

== See also ==
- List of CSX Transportation lines
