= Georgia Southern and Florida Railway =

Southern US railway

Georgia Southern and Florida Railway listed in Sholes' Directory, 1893

The Georgia Southern and Florida Railway (reporting mark GSF), also known as the Suwanee River Route from its crossing of the Suwanee River, was founded in 1885 as the Georgia Southern and Florida Railroad and began operations between Macon, GA and Valdosta, GA in 1889, extending to Palatka, FL in 1890. The railroad went bankrupt by 1891, was reorganized as the Georgia Southern and Florida Railway in 1895, and was controlled by the Southern Railway.

In 1902, the GS&F purchased the Atlantic, Valdosta and Western Railway that ran from Valdosta, GA to Jacksonville, FL. The GS&F also owned the Macon and Birmingham Railway and the Hawkinsville and Florida Southern Railway, both of which were operated as separate companies; both ended up going bankrupt and being mostly abandoned. The GS&F was eventually acquired by the Norfolk Southern Railway and still operates as a subsidiary. As of November 2012, at least one operating Norfolk Southern locomotive retains GSF reporting marks.

The line was abandoned south of Lake City, Florida in the late 1980s. The Palatka-Lake Butler State Trail runs along some of the abandoned right of way. The remaining line is still in service and operated by Norfolk Southern Railway. It is designated as Norfolk Southern's Macon District from Macon to Valdosta, and the Navair District from Valdosta to end of the line in Navair (just south of Lake City).

== Historic stations ==
State	Milepost	City/Location	Station	Connections and notes
GA	0.0 G	Macon	Terminal Station	opened in 1916 junction with: East Tennessee, Virginia and Georgia Railway (SOU); Macon, Dublin and Savannah Railroad (SAL); Macon and Brunswick Railroad (ETV&G/SOU)
GA	0.9 G	Macon	Macon Junction	junction with Central of Georgia Railway
GA	1.3 G	Macon	Macon Yard	
GA	4.4 G		Tamworth	
GA	7.9 G		Sofkee	junction with Macon and Birmingham Railway (GSF)
GA	10.6 G	Avondale	Avondale	
GA	13.0 G	Elberta	Elberta	
GA	16.0 G	Warner Robins	Warner Robins	originally named Wellston
GA	21.3 G	Bonaire	Bonaire	
GA	24.9 G	Kathleen	Kathleen	
GA	29.0 G		Tivola	
GA	30.9 G	Clinchfield	Clinchfield	
GA	34.9 G	Grovania	Grovania	
GA	38.4 G	Elko	Elko	
GA	43.9 G	Unadilla	Unadilla	
GA	48.8 G	Pinehurst	Pinehurst	
GA	51.7 G	Findlay	Findlay	
GA	56.2 G	Vienna	Vienna	
GA	59.5 G	Richwood	Richwood	
GA	64.5 G	Cordele	Cordele	junction with: Waycross Air Line Railroad (AB&C/ACL); Savannah, Americus and Montgomery Railway (SAL)
GA	69.2 G	Wenona	Wenona	
GA	74.4 G	Arabi	Arabi	
GA	77.5 G		Sibley	
GA	79.2 G	Dakota	Dakota	
GA	81.5 G	Worth	Worth	junction with Hawkinsville & Florida Southern Railway (GSF)
GA	84.8 G	Ashburn	Ashburn	
GA	87.4 G	Sycamore	Sycamore	
GA	91.6 G		Inaha	
GA	95.3 G	Sunsweet	Sunsweet	
GA	98.1 G	Chula	Chula	
GA	105.2 G	Tifton	Tifton	junction with: Tifton, Thomasville and Gulf Railway (AB&C/ACL); Tifton and Northeastern Railroad (AB&C/ACL); Atlanta, Birmingham and Coast Railroad (ACL)
GA	111.9 G	Eldorado	Eldorado	
GA	118.1 G	Lenox	Lenox	
GA	123.0 G	Laconte	Laconte	
GA	125.5 G	Sparks	Sparks	
GA	127.7 G	Adel	Adel	
GA	131.0 G		Heartpine	
GA	134.2 G	Cecil	Cecil	
GA	138.1 G	Hahira	Hahira	
GA	144.3 G	Mineola	Mineola	
GA	151.2 G	Valdosta	Valdosta	junction with: Savannah, Florida and Western Railroad (ACL); Georgia and Florida Railroad (SOU); Atlantic, Valdosta and Western Railway (GSF/SOU); Valdosta, Moultrie and Western Railroad
GA	157.6 B	Dasher	Dasher	
GA	163.4 B	Lake Park	Lake Park	
GA	167.2 B		Melrose	
FL	170.7 B	Jennings	Jennings	
FL	176.1 B	Avoca	Avoca	
FL	182.2 B	Jasper	Jasper	junction with Savannah, Florida and Western Railroad Florida Division (ACL)
FL	192.8 B		Genoa	
FL	196.3 B		Facil	
FL	199.7 B	White Springs	White Springs	
FL	203.2 B		Suwanee Valley	
FL	206.0 B		Winfield	
FL	211.6 B	Lake City	Lake City	junction with: Live Oak, Tampa and Charlotte Harbor Railroad Lake City Branch (ACL); Florida Central and Peninsular Railroad Western Division (SAL)
FL	212.7 B	Watertown	Watertown Junction	junction with Florida Central and Peninsular Railroad Western Division (SAL)
FL	219.0 B		Jefferson	
FL	222.3 B	Lulu	Lulu	
FL	227.9 B		Guilford	
FL	229.1 B		Cliftonville	
FL	232.9 B	Lake Butler	Lake Butler	junction with Jacksonville and Southwestern Railroad (ACL)
FL	239.2 B		New River	
FL	243.9 B	Sampson City	Sampson City	junction with: Atlantic, Suwannee River and Gulf Railway (SAL); Gainesville and Gulf Railroad (SAL)
FL	249.6 B	Hampton	Hampton	junction with Florida Central and Peninsular Railroad Southern Division (SAL)
FL	253.4 B		Theressa	
FL	257.8 B		Brooklyn	
FL	258.5 B	Keystone Heights	Keystone Heights	
FL	259.9 B	Lake Geneva	Lake Geneva	
FL	264.5 B	Putnam Hall	Putnam Hall	
FL	267.1 B	Grandin	Grandin	
FL	269.1 B	Florahome	Florahome	
FL	273.0 B		Baywood	
FL	275.4 B		Carraway	
FL	278.0 B		Woodburn	
FL	280.0 B		Springside	
FL	285.6 B	Palatka	Palatka	relocated to union depot in 1908 junction with: Florida Southern Railway (ACL); Jacksonville, Tampa and Key West Railway (ACL); Florida East Coast Railway Palatka Branch; Ocklawaha Valley Railroad

== See also ==
- Palatka-Lake Butler State Trail
