= Tift County, Georgia =

County in Georgia, United States

- County
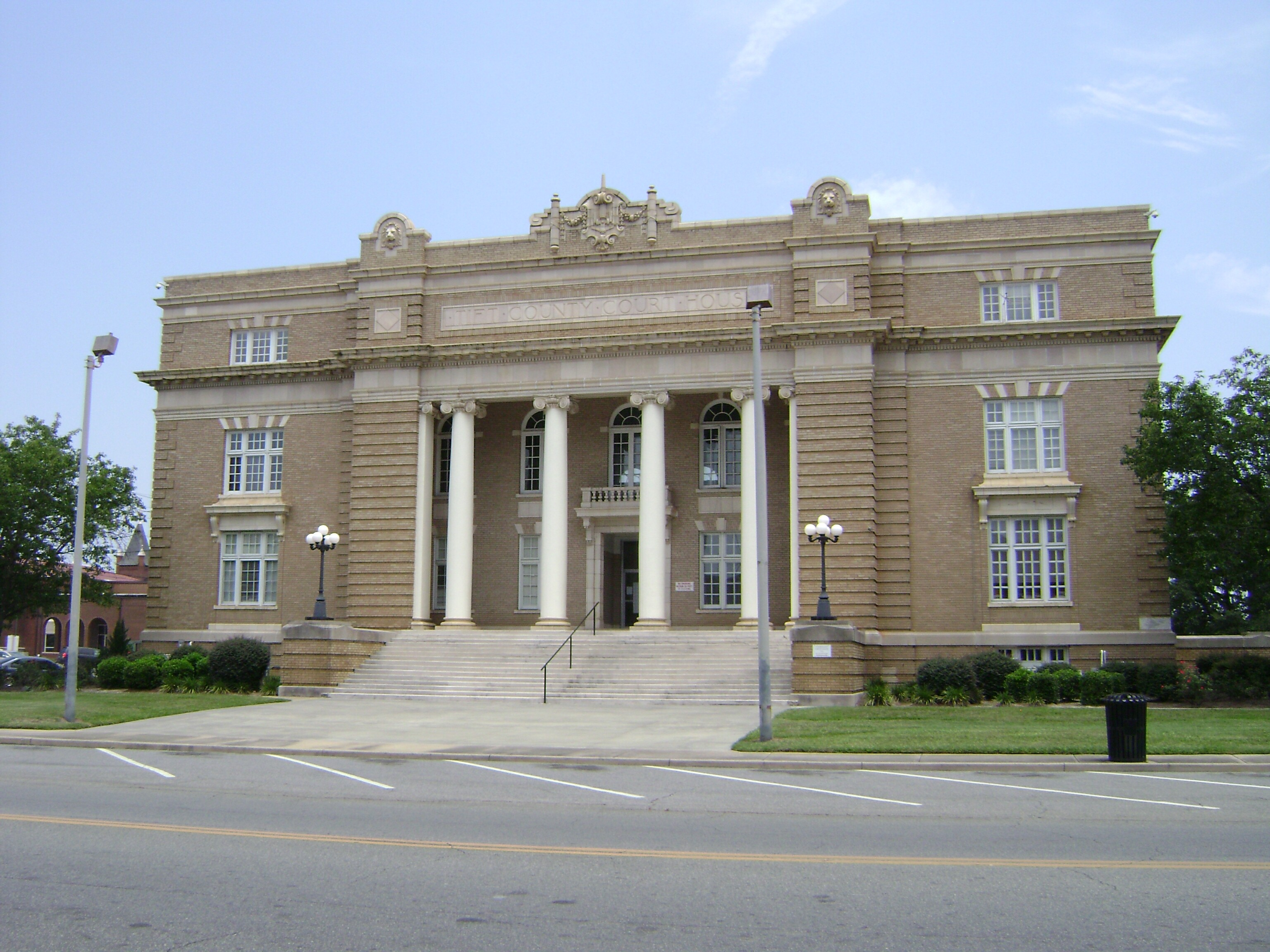
- Tift County Courthouse, (Built 1912), Tifton

- Seal Logo

- Location within the U.S. state of Georgia
- Coordinates: 31°28′N 83°32′W
- Country: United States
- State: Georgia
- Founded: August 17, 1905; 121 years ago
- Named for: Nelson Tift
- Seat: Tifton
- Largest city: Tifton

Area
  - Total: 269 sq mi (700 km^{2})
  - Land: 259 sq mi (670 km^{2})
  - Water: 9.9 sq mi (26 km^{2}) 3.7%

Population (2020)
  - Total: 41,344
  - Estimate (2025): 42,254 ▲
  - Density: 160/sq mi (62/km^{2})
- Time zone: UTC−5 (Eastern)
  - Summer (DST): UTC−4 (EDT)
- Congressional district: 8th
- Website: tiftcounty.org

Tift County is a county located in the south central portion of the U.S. state of Georgia. As of the 2020 census, the population was 41,344. The county seat is Tifton.

Tift County comprises the Tifton, Georgia micropolitan statistical area.

== History ==
The county was created on August 17, 1905, and is named for Henry Harding Tift, who founded Tifton in 1872. Tift purchased about 65,000 acres of virgin pine timberland there in the Wiregrass Region of South Georgia, and established a sawmill and a village for his workers. Tift eventually expanded into turpentine and barrel-making operations, and turned his barren timberlands into farms for cotton, corn, livestock, fruit, tobacco, pecans and sweet potatoes. When the Georgia Southern and Florida Railway intersected the Brunswick and Western Railroad near Tift's mill in 1888, the settlement was connected to Atlanta and became a boom town. It was incorporated as Tifton by the Georgia Legislature in 1890.

Tift provided employment and financial growth opportunities for his flourishing market center by founding the Tifton Cotton Mill, the Bank of Tifton, and other types of businesses in which he had a leading interest. These included fruit growing, groceries and general merchandise, cottonseed oil, lumber, brick and stone, and several railroads, all essential for the development of a region. Tift also established a model farm north of town and donated a large parcel of acreage for an agricultural experiment station; these enterprises led eventually to the development of Abraham Baldwin College and the Coastal Plain Experiment Station in Tifton.

Tift's civic commitment was most evident in his donation of lands for churches (Methodist, Baptist, and Episcopal) and Fulwood Park, and in his decades of service as a city councilman and mayor. Through a variety of business and civic undertakings, Tift contributed significantly to the economic and social development of south central Georgia. Though a captain of industry, agriculture, and finance, he is best remembered for his civic service and generosity.

Tift County was created on August 17, 1905, by an act of the General Assembly. Because Georgia law in 1905 did not allow a new county to be named after a living person, the legislature voted to name Tift County after Nelson Tift of Albany, Georgia, who was an uncle of Henry Harding Tift.

In 2013, John Edward (Edd) Dorminey a native of Tifton, author and historian drafted resolutions and presented them to the Tifton and Tift County Commissions which were passed unanimously. Soon after with assistance from Representative Jay Roberts the Georgia House of Representatives and the Senate voted to approve the submitted resolution establishing the naming of Tift County after its rightful founder, Henry Harding Tift.

== Geography ==
According to the U.S. Census Bureau, the county has a total area of 269 square miles (700 km^{2}), of which 259 square miles (670 km^{2}) is land and 9.9 square miles (26 km^{2}) (3.7%) is water.

The western portion of Tift County, roughly west of Interstate 75, is located in the Little River sub-basin of the Suwannee River basin. The county's southeastern third, from north of Tifton heading southeast, is located in the Withlacoochee River sub-basin of the same Suwannee River basin. The northeastern portion of the Tift County, east of Chula, is located in the Alapaha River sub-basin of the same larger Suwannee River basin.

=== Major highways ===
- Interstate 75 / State Route 401 (unsigned)
- U.S. Route 41 / State Route 7
- U.S. Route 82 / State Route 520
- U.S. Route 319 / State Route 35
- State Route 125

=== Adjacent counties ===
- Irwin County (northeast)
- Berrien County (southeast)
- Cook County (south)
- Colquitt County (southwest)
- Worth County (west)
- Turner County (northwest)

== Communities ==
=== Cities ===
- Omega
- Tifton
- Ty Ty

=== Census-designated places ===
- Phillipsburg
- Unionville

=== Unincorporated communities ===
- Brookfield
- Chula

== Demographics ==
Historical population
| Census | Pop. | Note | %± |
|---|---|---|---|
| 1910 | 11,487 | | — |
| 1920 | 14,493 | | 26.2% |
| 1930 | 16,068 | | 10.9% |
| 1940 | 18,599 | | 15.8% |
| 1950 | 22,645 | | 21.8% |
| 1960 | 23,487 | | 3.7% |
| 1970 | 27,288 | | 16.2% |
| 1980 | 32,862 | | 20.4% |
| 1990 | 34,998 | | 6.5% |
| 2000 | 38,407 | | 9.7% |
| 2010 | 40,118 | | 4.5% |
| 2020 | 41,344 | | 3.1% |
| 2025 (est.) | 42,254 | ▲ | 2.2% |
U.S. Decennial Census; 1790-1880 1890-1910; 1920-1930 1930-1940; 1940-1950 1960-1980; 1980-2000 2010

=== Racial and ethnic composition ===
Tift County, Georgia – Racial and ethnic composition Note: the US Census treats Hispanic/Latino as an ethnic category. This table excludes Latinos from the racial categories and assigns them to a separate category. Hispanics/Latinos may be of any race.
| Race / Ethnicity (NH = Non-Hispanic) | Pop 1980 | Pop 1990 | Pop 2000 | Pop 2010 | Pop 2020 | % 1980 | % 1990 | % 2000 | % 2010 | % 2020 |
|---|---|---|---|---|---|---|---|---|---|---|
| White alone (NH) | 23,897 | 24,246 | 24,092 | 23,555 | 22,189 | 72.72% | 69.28% | 62.73% | 58.71% | 53.67% |
| Black or African American alone (NH) | 8,393 | 9,288 | 10,695 | 11,549 | 12,049 | 25.54% | 26.54% | 27.85% | 28.79% | 29.14% |
| Native American or Alaska Native alone (NH) | 46 | 40 | 66 | 72 | 56 | 0.14% | 0.11% | 0.17% | 0.18% | 0.14% |
| Asian alone (NH) | 82 | 173 | 372 | 507 | 650 | 0.25% | 0.49% | 0.97% | 1.26% | 1.57% |
| Native Hawaiian or Pacific Islander alone (NH) | x | x | 8 | 8 | 2 | x | x | 0.02% | 0.02% | 0.00% |
| Other race alone (NH) | 14 | 18 | 5 | 33 | 91 | 0.04% | 0.05% | 0.01% | 0.08% | 0.22% |
| Mixed race or Multiracial (NH) | x | x | 225 | 357 | 1,088 | x | x | 0.59% | 0.89% | 2.63% |
| Hispanic or Latino (any race) | 430 | 1,233 | 2,944 | 4,037 | 5,219 | 1.31% | 3.52% | 7.67% | 10.06% | 12.62% |
| Total | 32,862 | 34,998 | 38,407 | 40,118 | 41,344 | 100.00% | 100.00% | 100.00% | 100.00% | 100.00% |

=== 2020 census ===
As of the 2020 census, there were 41,344 people, 15,921 households, and 10,703 families residing in the county.

The median age was 37.1 years, 24.5% of residents were under the age of 18, and 16.1% were 65 years of age or older; for every 100 females there were 90.6 males, and among those 18 and over there were 86.5 males per 100 females. 59.5% of residents lived in urban areas while 40.5% lived in rural areas.

The racial makeup of the county was 56.2% White, 29.3% Black or African American, 0.3% American Indian and Alaska Native, 1.6% Asian, 0.0% Native Hawaiian and Pacific Islander, 6.7% from some other race, and 5.8% from two or more races; Hispanic or Latino residents of any race comprised 12.6% of the population.

There were 15,921 households, of which 32.8% had children under the age of 18 living with them and 33.2% had a female householder with no spouse or partner present; about 27.9% of all households were made up of individuals and 11.8% had someone living alone who was 65 years of age or older.

There were 17,375 housing units, of which 8.4% were vacant. Among occupied housing units, 58.4% were owner-occupied and 41.6% were renter-occupied; the homeowner vacancy rate was 1.3% and the rental vacancy rate was 5.9%.

== Education ==
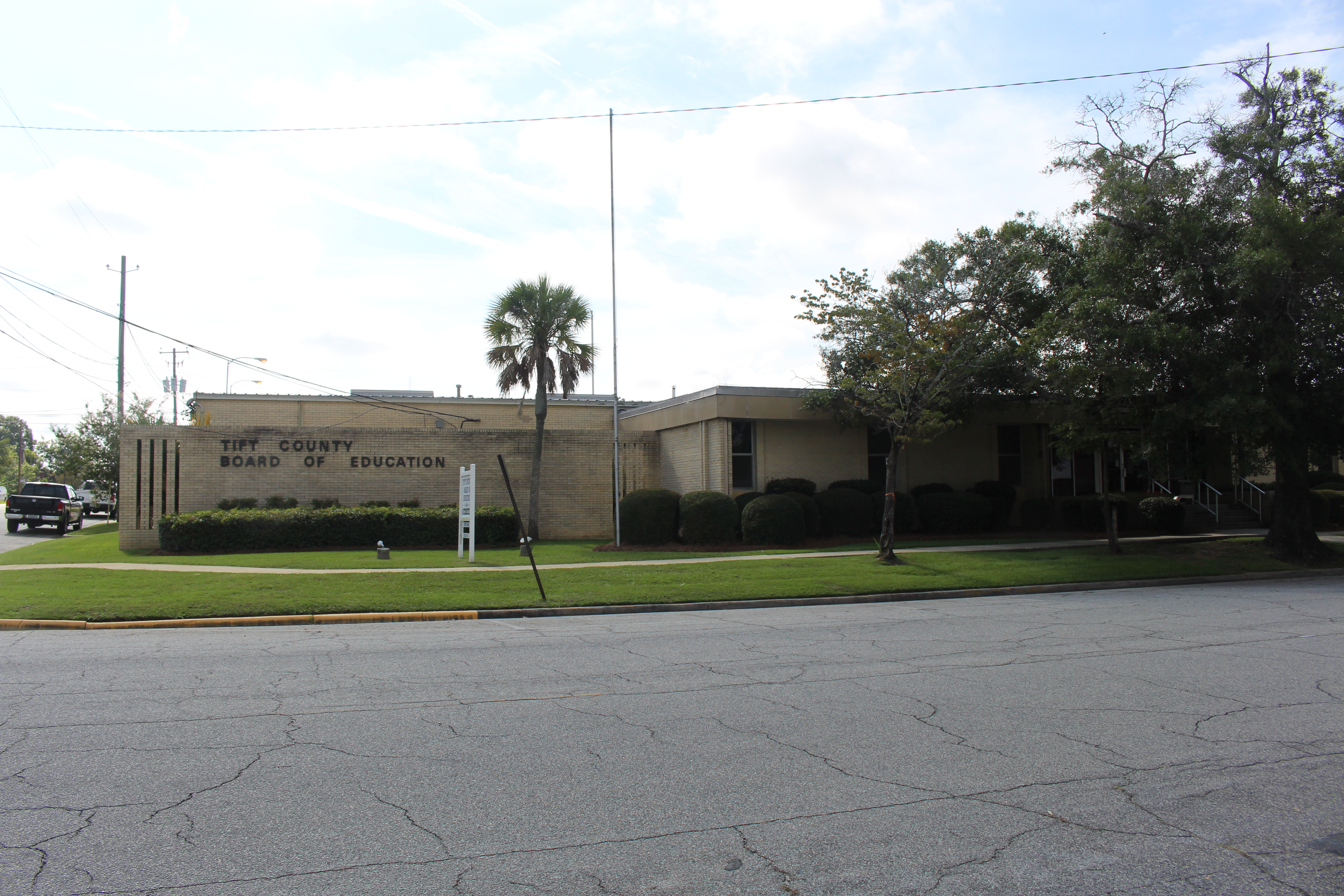
Tift County School District headquarters

Tift County School District operates public schools.

== Politics ==
As of the 2020s, Tift County is a Republican stronghold, voting 67.7% for Donald Trump in 2024. For elections to the United States House of Representatives, Tift County is part of Georgia's 8th congressional district, currently represented by Austin Scott. For elections to the Georgia State Senate, Tift County is part of District 13. For elections to the Georgia House of Representatives, Tift County is part of Districts 169 and 170.

United States presidential election results for Tift County, Georgia
| Year | Republican | | Democratic | | Third party(ies) | |
| Year | No. | % | No. | % | No. | % |
|---|---|---|---|---|---|---|
| 1912 | 0 | 0.00% | 305 | 94.43% | 18 | 5.57% |
| 1916 | 42 | 3.36% | 1,034 | 82.79% | 173 | 13.85% |
| 1920 | 154 | 21.10% | 576 | 78.90% | 0 | 0.00% |
| 1924 | 33 | 5.55% | 522 | 87.73% | 40 | 6.72% |
| 1928 | 511 | 40.98% | 736 | 59.02% | 0 | 0.00% |
| 1932 | 65 | 4.43% | 1,394 | 95.09% | 7 | 0.48% |
| 1936 | 161 | 8.95% | 1,627 | 90.49% | 10 | 0.56% |
| 1940 | 226 | 13.21% | 1,463 | 85.51% | 22 | 1.29% |
| 1944 | 396 | 19.55% | 1,630 | 80.45% | 0 | 0.00% |
| 1948 | 637 | 13.72% | 3,158 | 68.00% | 849 | 18.28% |
| 1952 | 1,318 | 30.85% | 2,954 | 69.15% | 0 | 0.00% |
| 1956 | 960 | 23.51% | 3,123 | 76.49% | 0 | 0.00% |
| 1960 | 1,423 | 32.44% | 2,964 | 67.56% | 0 | 0.00% |
| 1964 | 4,650 | 67.04% | 2,286 | 32.96% | 0 | 0.00% |
| 1968 | 1,692 | 24.81% | 1,187 | 17.40% | 3,942 | 57.79% |
| 1972 | 4,591 | 84.91% | 816 | 15.09% | 0 | 0.00% |
| 1976 | 2,162 | 29.43% | 5,185 | 70.57% | 0 | 0.00% |
| 1980 | 3,280 | 40.89% | 4,572 | 56.99% | 170 | 2.12% |
| 1984 | 4,429 | 61.81% | 2,736 | 38.19% | 0 | 0.00% |
| 1988 | 4,760 | 65.80% | 2,446 | 33.81% | 28 | 0.39% |
| 1992 | 4,485 | 46.87% | 3,930 | 41.07% | 1,154 | 12.06% |
| 1996 | 5,613 | 53.07% | 4,198 | 39.69% | 766 | 7.24% |
| 2000 | 6,678 | 64.66% | 3,547 | 34.34% | 103 | 1.00% |
| 2004 | 8,619 | 68.75% | 3,864 | 30.82% | 54 | 0.43% |
| 2008 | 9,431 | 66.09% | 4,749 | 33.28% | 89 | 0.62% |
| 2012 | 9,185 | 65.88% | 4,660 | 33.42% | 97 | 0.70% |
| 2016 | 9,584 | 67.13% | 4,347 | 30.45% | 345 | 2.42% |
| 2020 | 10,784 | 66.24% | 5,318 | 32.67% | 178 | 1.09% |
| 2024 | 11,496 | 67.67% | 5,438 | 32.01% | 55 | 0.32% |

United States Senate election results for Tift County, Georgia2
| Year | Republican | | Democratic | | Third party(ies) | |
| Year | No. | % | No. | % | No. | % |
|---|---|---|---|---|---|---|
| 2020 | 10,814 | 67.27% | 4,956 | 30.83% | 305 | 1.90% |
| 2020 | 9,681 | 67.20% | 4,726 | 32.80% | 0 | 0.00% |

United States Senate election results for Tift County, Georgia3
| Year | Republican | | Democratic | | Third party(ies) | |
| Year | No. | % | No. | % | No. | % |
|---|---|---|---|---|---|---|
| 2020 | 5,603 | 34.97% | 3,284 | 20.50% | 7,136 | 44.54% |
| 2020 | 10,784 | 66.96% | 5,322 | 33.04% | 0 | 0.00% |
| 2022 | 8,921 | 68.76% | 3,878 | 29.89% | 176 | 1.36% |
| 2022 | 8,243 | 68.47% | 3,796 | 31.53% | 0 | 0.00% |

Georgia Gubernatorial election results for Tift County
| Year | Republican | | Democratic | | Third party(ies) | |
| Year | No. | % | No. | % | No. | % |
|---|---|---|---|---|---|---|
| 2022 | 9,418 | 72.20% | 3,546 | 27.18% | 80 | 0.61% |

== See also ==
- National Register of Historic Places listings in Tift County, Georgia
- List of counties in Georgia
