= Tifton, Thomasville and Gulf Railway =

Overview
- Locale: Southern Georgia
- Dates of operation: 1990–1906
- Successor: Atlantic and Birmingham Railroad

Technical
- Track gauge: 4 ft 8 1/2 in (1,435 mm) (standard gauge)

The Tifton, Thomasville and Gulf Railway (TT&G) was a railway that operated from Tifton, Georgia southwest to Thomasville, Georgia in the early 1900s. It later became part of the Atlanta, Birmingham and Atlantic Railway and Atlantic Coast Line Railroad networks.

== History ==
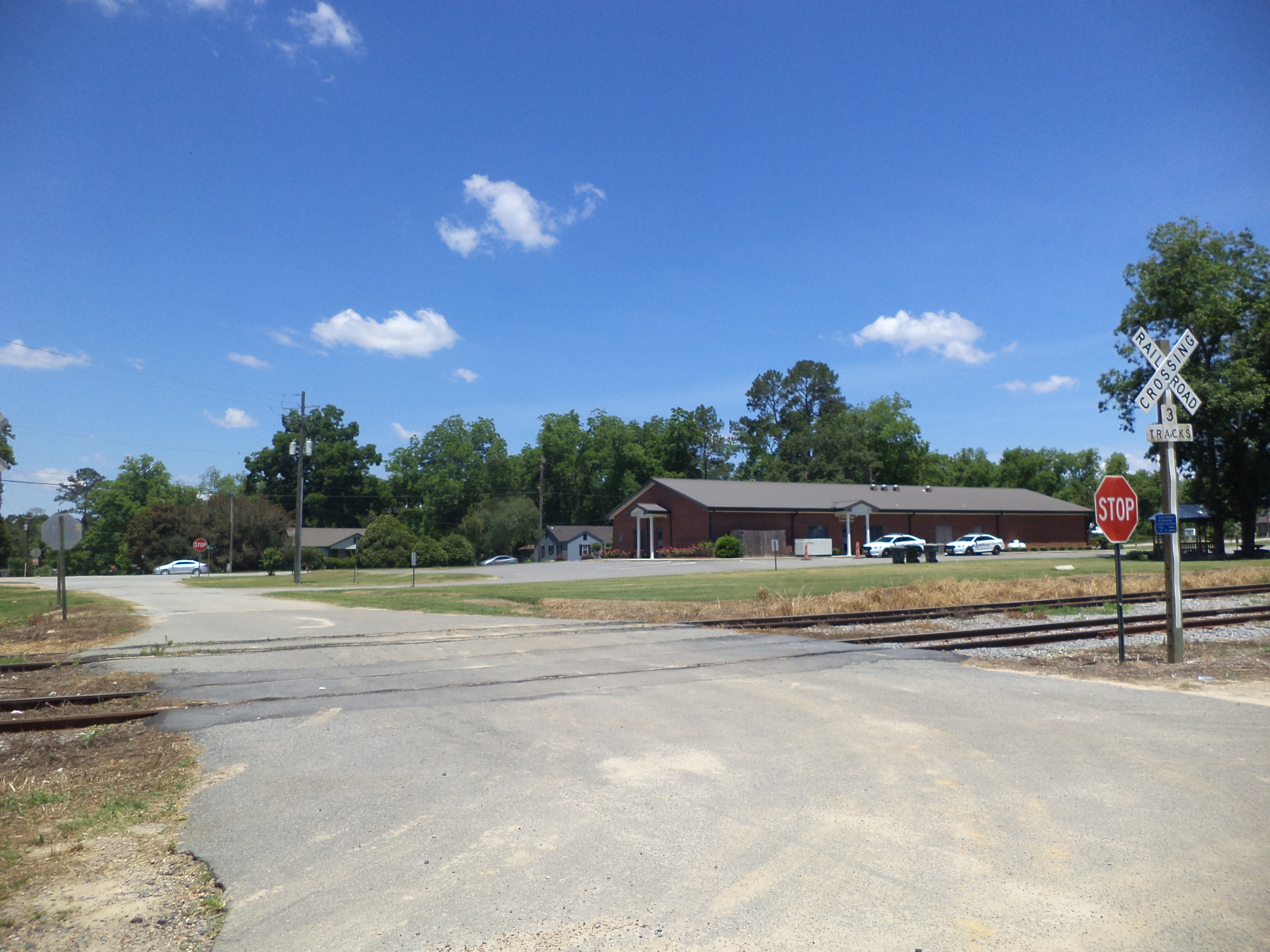
Former Tifton, Thomasville and Gulf Railway tracks in Coolidge

The Tifton, Thomasville and Gulf Railway was chartered on June 26, 1897 by business interests in Tifton. It was built from Tifton to Thomasville in 1900. In Tifton, it connected with the Tifton and Northeastern Railroad, which ran northeast to Fitzgerald, Georgia.

Both the TT&G and the Tifton and Northeastern Railroad were acquired by the Atlantic and Birmingham Railroad on December 3, 1903, which was renamed the Atlantic and Birmingham Railway (A&B). This gave the Atlantic and Birmingham a continuous branch line, known as the Thomasville Branch, from Fitzgerald (where it connected to the rest of the A&B network) to Thomasville.

The Atlantic and Birmingham then became part of the Atlanta, Birmingham and Atlantic Railroad (AB&A) when it took over the A&B network on April 12, 1906. The AB&A ran daily passenger trains from Atlanta to Thomasville via Fitzgerald and Tifton on the former TT&G line.

The Atlanta, Birmingham and Atlantic Railroad was acquired by the Atlantic Coast Line Railroad in 1926. The Thomasville Branch connected with the Atlantic Coast Line Railroad's Waycross—Montgomery Line in Thomasville. The Atlantic Coast Line operated the AB&A network as the Atlanta, Birmingham and Coast Railroad (AB&C) until 1946, when they fully merged the AB&C into the Atlantic Coast Line Railroad. The Atlantic Coast Line Railroad continued to operate the Thomasville Branch in its entirety until 1960, when it was abandoned north of Moultrie, Georgia.

The Atlantic Coast Line became the Seaboard Coast Line Railroad (SCL) in 1967 after merging with their rival, the Seaboard Air Line Railroad (SAL). The remaining TT&G line from Thomasville to Moultrie was designated by the merged company as the Moultrie Subdivision.

In 1980, the Seaboard Coast Line's parent company merged with the Chessie System, creating the CSX Corporation. The CSX Corporation initially operated the Chessie and Seaboard Systems separately until 1986, when they were merged into CSX Transportation. CSX abandoned track from Moultrie to Coolidge, Georgia in 1990.

== Current conditions ==
Today, the only remaining segment of the Tifton, Thomasville and Gulf Railway is from Thomasville to Coolidge. It is known today as their Coolidge Industrial Spur.

== Historic stations ==
| Milepost | City/Location | Station | Connections and notes |
|---|---|---|---|
| ANK 691.5 | Thomasville | Thomasville | junction with Atlantic Coast Line Railroad Waycross—Montgomery Line |
| ANK 698.0 | | Dillon | |
| ANK 699.5 | | Touraine | |
| ANK 701.5 | | Merrillville | |
| ANK 704.4 | | Humbolt | |
| ANK 706.0 | Coolidge | Coolidge | |
| ANK 707.0 | | Mascotte | |
| ANK 709.0 | | Rothersay | |
| ANK 710.5 | | Murphy | |
| ANK 714.0 | | Sunset | |
| ANK 717.5 | | Corbetts | |
| ANK 719.6 | Moultrie | Moultrie | junction with: Georgia Northern Railway (SOU); Sparks, Moultrie and Gulf Railroad |
| ANK 722.0 | | Kingwood | |
| ANK 725.4 | | Barbers | |
| ANK 729.8 | Norman Park | Norman Park | |
| ANK 733.3 | | Crosland | |
| ANK 735.6 | | Fad | |
| ANK 737.0 | Omega | Omega | |
| ANK 738.0 | | Urbana | |
| ANK 739.9 | | Iniss | |
| ANK 743.4 | | Kell | |
| ANK 747.0 | Tifton | Tifton | junction with: Tifton and Northeastern Railroad (AB&C/ACL); Brunswick and Western Railroad (SF&W/ACL); Georgia Southern and Florida Railway (SOU) |
