= Gulf Line Railway =

Railroad in Georgia, United States

The Gulf Line Railway was a railroad in the U.S. state of Georgia, connecting Hawkinsville and Camilla. The line eventually became part of the Southern Railway, but is no longer in use.

== History ==
The Flint River and Gulf Railway was incorporated in 1901 and opened in 1906 between Ashburn and Bridgeboro. In 1907 it leased the Hawkinsville and Florida Southern Railway between Hawkinsville and Worth, connecting via trackage rights over the Georgia Southern and Florida Railway between Worth and Ashburn, but later that year it was reorganized as the Gulf Line Railway.

The Gulf Line Railway, which continued to operate north to Hawkinsville, completed the line from Bridgeboro southwest to Camilla in early 1912. A planned extension to the Gulf of Mexico was never built. It also leased the Hawkinsville-Grovania Hawkinsville and Western Railroad for one year from July 1, 1912, but did not renew the lease. On August 1, 1913, the Georgia Southern and Florida Railway-controlled Hawkinsville and Florida Southern Railway absorbed its lessee, the Gulf Line Railway.
