= Waycross Air Line Railroad =

Defunct railroad in Georgia

- Atlantic and Birmingham Railroad (1901–1903); Atlantic and Birmingham Railway (1903–1906)
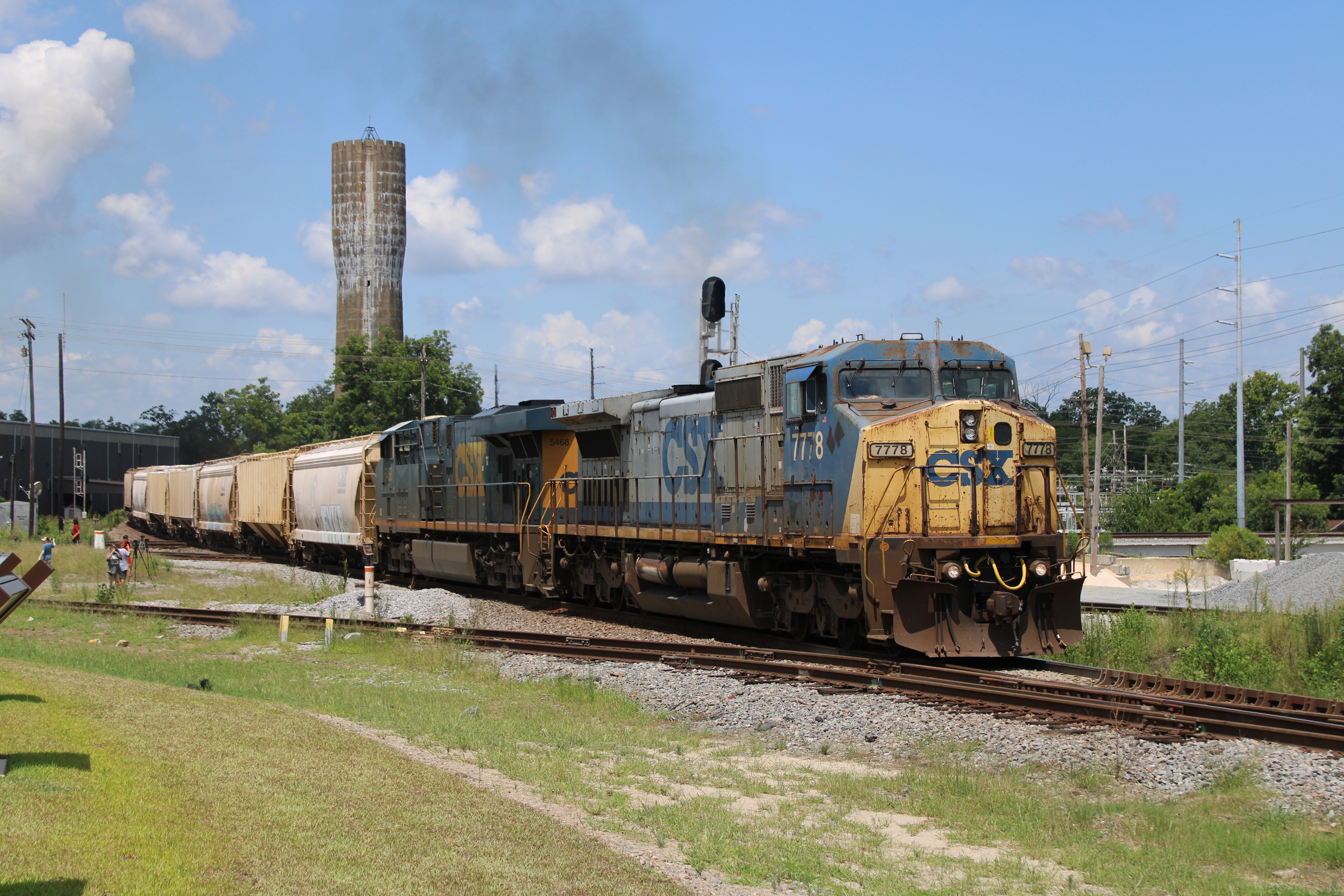
- A CSX Transportation freight train in Cordele, Georgia on the former Waycross Air Line Railroad mainline

Overview
- Current operator: CSX Transportation
- Dates of operation: 1890–1906
- Successor: Atlanta, Birmingham and Atlantic Railway

Technical
- Track gauge: 4 ft 8 1/2 in (1,435 mm) standard gauge

The Waycross Air Line Railroad, chartered in 1887, was an air-line railroad in Georgia. It began operations between Waycross and Sessoms in 1890. In 1901, the railroad had extended as far as Fitzgerald, Georgia, at which time its charter was amended for an extension to Birmingham, Alabama, and it was renamed the Atlantic and Birmingham Railroad. That company purchased the Tifton and Northeastern Railroad and Tifton, Thomasville and Gulf Railway on December 3, 1903, changing its name to the Atlantic and Birmingham Railway. In 1906, the Atlantic and Birmingham Railway was in turn purchased by the Atlanta, Birmingham and Atlantic Railway, which continued expansion towards Birmingham.

The Atlanta, Birmingham and Atlantic Railway changed hands again in 1926, becoming the Atlanta, Birmingham and Coast Railroad, a subsidiary of the Atlantic Coast Line Railroad. The original Waycross Air Line Railroad main line survived the 1967 ACL and SAL merger into the Seaboard Coast Line Railroad, the acquisition of the Family Lines (CRR, L&N, GA, AWP) into the Seaboard System Railroad in 1982 and finally absorption into the Chessie System to become part of CSX in 1987. As of 2022, it remains in service as an important CSX Transportation line, known as the Fitzgerald Subdivision.

== History ==
=== Formation ===
The Waycross Air Line Railroad was originally chartered on October 24, 1887, by the Waycross Lumber Company, which owned a sawmill in Waltertown, Georgia, a distance of seven miles (11 km) from Waycross. Before chartering the Waycross Air Line Railroad, the company had previously operated a short railroad between its mill and Waycross; this formed the beginnings of the WALR. The railroad formally opened in 1890, with 25 miles (40 km) of track from Waycross to Sessoms, Georgia. Following an acquisition by Stilwell, Miller and Company, the WALR expanded, first to Bolen, Georgia, and then further to Nicholls, Georgia.

=== Expansion ===
Work on an extension of the line to the city of Fitzgerald, Georgia began on August 15, 1900. Service to that city started on February 26, 1901, following the completion of a new passenger station; a freight station was under construction and planned to open shortly after the passenger station. At the same time, the company also announced plans to expand beyond Fitzgerald in a northwestern direction.

=== Atlantic and Birmingham Railroad ===
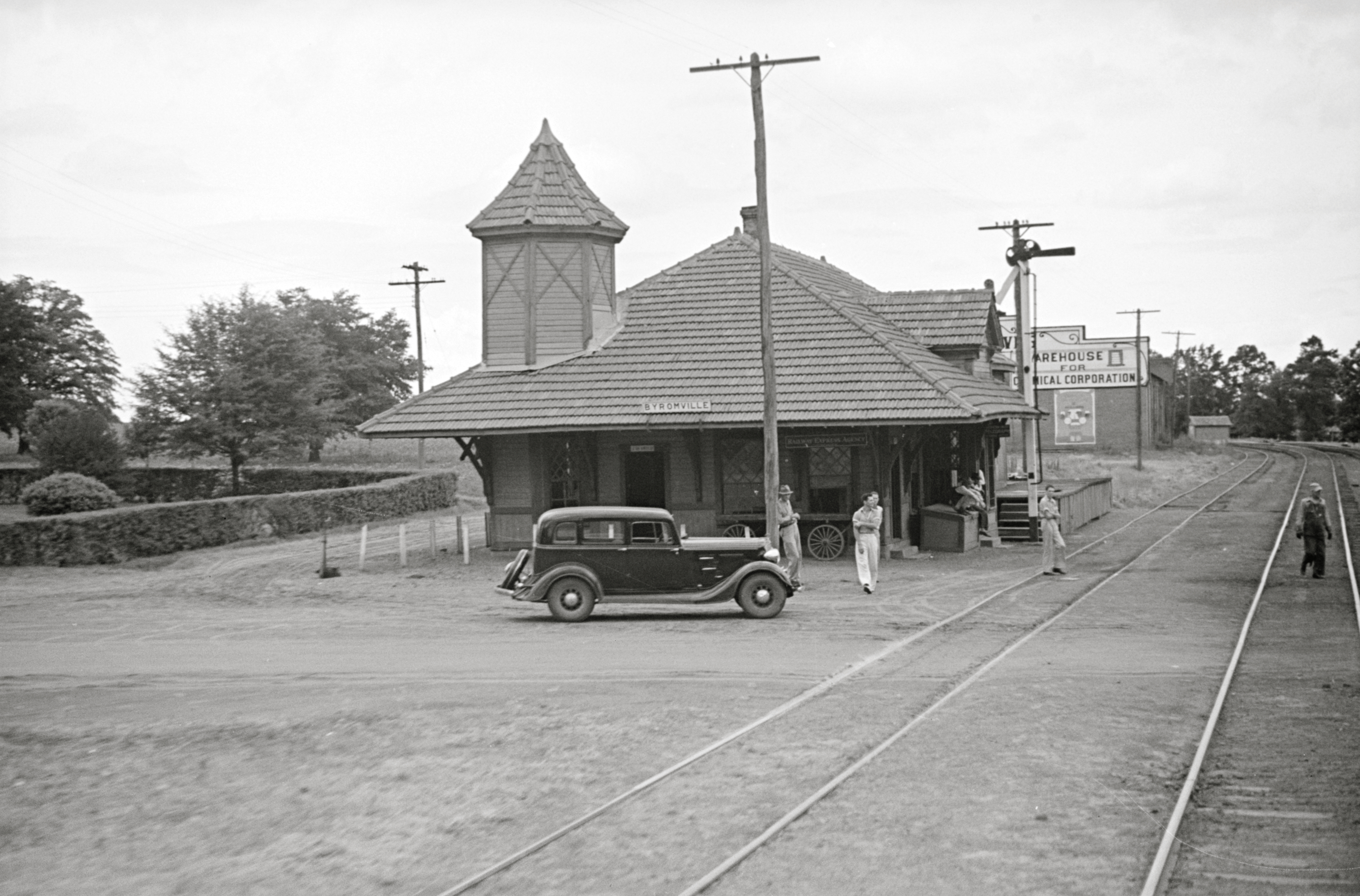
The Byromville, Georgia station in 1938, operated by the Atlanta, Birmingham and Coast Railroad

The company's directors decided to rename the Waycross Air Line Railroad to the Atlantic and Birmingham Railroad on October 25, 1901, as part of a charter modification allowing further expansion. The new name was chosen to indicate the company's plans to connect Birmingham, Alabama, with the Atlantic Ocean. At this point, the company had expanded from its initial seven miles to 150 miles (240 km). Starting from Fitzgerald, new tracks reached Cordele, Georgia on May 25, 1902. The following year additional construction was completed from Cordele as far as Montezuma, Georgia, where the Atlantic and Birmingham Railroad met the Central of Georgia Railway. Plans for construction the rest of the way to Birmingham were underway, with the company launching surveys of a proposed route.

The Atlantic and Birmingham Railroad purchased two smaller railroads in 1903, including the Tifton and Northeastern Railroad and the Tifton, Thomasville and Gulf Railway, between them adding an additional 81 miles (130 km) of track. As part of this merger, the company changed its name from the Atlantic and Birmingham Railroad to the Atlantic and Birmingham Railway. Another railroad, the Brunswick and Birmingham Railroad, was purchased in 1904.

==== Strike ====
The Atlantic and Birmingham Railroad was faced with a strike in December 1905. The company's locomotive engineers and firemen had demanded better pay, shorter hours of work, and protection from being summarily fired, demands the railroad refused to accept. As a result, the company's employees, members of the Brotherhood of Locomotive Firemen and Enginemen, began a strike at the end of the day on December 10, 1905, following a unanimous vote in favor of striking.

=== Atlanta, Birmingham and Atlantic Railway ===
In 1906, the company was merged into the Atlanta, Birmingham and Atlantic Railroad, which was formed in 1905 specifically to purchase and extend the Atlantic and Birmingham. The AB&A's charter authorized it to build from the existing terminus of the Atlantic and Birmingham at Montezuma to the city of Birmingham, along with a new branch line to Atlanta. Under the AB&A, the railroad finally reached Birmingham in the middle of 1908. However, the company soon ran into financial troubles and was forced into receivership in 1909; it exited receivership in 1915 as the Atlanta, Birmingham and Atlantic Railway. More financial problems led to a foreclosure in 1922, before being again reorganized in 1926 as the Atlanta, Birmingham and Coast Railroad, a subsidiary of the Atlantic Coast Line Railroad. Twenty years later, the ACL formally purchased the ABC railroad.

=== Atlantic Coast Line and successors ===
Most of the route built by the Waycross Air Line Railroad and its successors remained in service with the Atlantic Coast Line, and continued following the Seaboard Coast Line Railroad merger in 1967, the formation of the Seaboard System Railroad in 1982, and finally absorption into CSX Transportation in 1986. CSX abandoned or truncated several branches of the former system in the 1980s and 1990s, but the majority of it continues in service. The original Waycross Air Line Railroad, along with the extension built by the AB&A to Birmingham, serves as CSX's primary route between Florida and the Midwestern United States, and has been upgraded in portions with double track and concrete ties.

== Historic stations ==
Waycross to Manchester
Milepost	City/Location	Station	Connections and notes
ANB 586.5	Waycross	Waycross	junction with: Savannah, Florida and Western Railway (ACL); Brunswick and Western Railroad (SF&W/ACL)
ANB 591.1		Jamestown	
ANB 593.1		Waltertown	
ANB 598.6		Haywood	
ANB 602.5	Bolen	Bolen	
ANB 606.4	Beach	Beach	
ANB 609.4		Murray	
ANB 613.0	Sessoms	Sessoms	junction with Brunswick and Birmingham Railroad (AB&C/ACL)
ANB 615.9	Nicholls	Nicholls	
ANB 620.3		Saginaw	
ANB 623.5		Chatterton	
ANB 629.5	Douglas	Douglas	junction with Georgia and Florida Railroad (CoG/SOU)
ANB 632.0		Upton	
ANB 636.4	Bushnell	Bushnell	
ANB 640.7	Ambrose	Ambrose	
ANB 643.9	Wray	Wray	
ANB 649.8	Osierfield	Osierfield	
ANB 653.6	Ashton	Ashton	
ANB 659.7	Fitzgerald	Fitzgerald	junction with: Tifton and Northeastern Railroad (AB&C/ACL); Abbeville and Waycross Railroad (SAL)
ANB 667.5	Abba	Abba	
ANB 669.5		Arp	
ANB 672.8	Rebecca	Rebecca	
ANB 678.1	Double Run	Double Run	
ANB 683.1	Hatley	Hatley	
ANB 688.7		Musselwhite	
ANB 694.7	Cordele	Cordele	junction with: Georgia Southern and Florida Railway (SOU); Savannah, Americus and Montgomery Railway (SAL)
ANB 697.7		Ross	
ANB 704.5	Vienna	Vienna	
ANB 710.0	Lilly	Lilly	
ANB 715.3	Byromville	Byromville	
ANB 717.5	Dooling	Dooling	
ANB 722.8		Fields	
ANB 726.3	Montezuma	Montezuma	
ANB 728.2	Oglethorpe	Oglethorpe	junction with Southwestern Railroad (SOU)
ANB 733.3		Bartlett	
ANB 736.6	Ideal	Ideal	
ANB 739.6		Southland	
ANB 745.9	Rupert	Rupert	
ANB 750.9	Charing	Charing	
ANB 755.3	Mauk	Mauk	
ANB 757.1		Norwich	
ANB 760.2		Brownsand	
ANB 762.1	Junction City	Junction City	junction with Central of Georgia Railway (SOU)
ANB 762.7		Paschal	
ANB 770.3	Talbotton	Talbotton	
ANB 775.2		Beall	
ANB 781.1	Woodland	Woodland	
ANB 786.4	Chalybeate Springs	Chalybeate Springs	
ANB 788.1	Manchester	Manchester	
