= Phillipsburg, Georgia =

- Unincorporated community Census-designated place
- Location in Tift County and the state of Georgia
- Coordinates: 31°26′24″N 83°31′9″W
- Country: United States
- State: Georgia
- County: Tift

Area
  - Total: 0.31 sq mi (0.80 km^{2})
  - Land: 0.31 sq mi (0.80 km^{2})
  - Water: 0 sq mi (0.00 km^{2})
- Elevation: 315 ft (96 m)

Population (2020)
  - Total: 640
  - Density: 2,079.3/sq mi (802.84/km^{2})
- Time zone: UTC-5 (Eastern (EST))
  - Summer (DST): UTC-4 (EDT)
- ZIP code: 31794
- Area code: 229
- FIPS code: 13-60508
- GNIS feature ID: 0332653

Phillipsburg is an unincorporated community and census-designated place (CDP) in Tift County, Georgia, United States. As of the 2020 census, Phillipsburg had a population of 640.

== Geography ==
Phillipsburg is located at 31°26′24″N 83°31′9″W (31.439871, -83.519296).

According to the United States Census Bureau, the CDP has a total area of 0.3 square mile (0.8 km^{2}), all land.

== Demographics ==
Historical population
Census	Pop.	Note	%±
1960	2,037		—
1970	2,335		14.6%
1980	2,450		4.9%
1990	1,044		−57.4%
2000	887		−15.0%
2010	707		−20.3%
2020	640		−9.5%
U.S. Decennial Census; 1850-1870 1870-1880; 1890-1910 1920-1930; 1940 1950 1960; 1970 1980 1990; 2000 2010 2020

In the 1950 U.S. census, Phillipsburg was part of the census-defined Unionville-Phillipsburg unincorporated place with population of 2,770. In the 1960 U.S. census, the two communities were separated with Phillipsburg listed as an unincorporated place with a population of 2,037. Phillipsburg was redesignated as a census designated place in the 1980 United States census.

=== Racial and ethnic composition ===
Phillipsburg CDP, Georgia – Racial and ethnic composition Note: the US Census treats Hispanic/Latino as an ethnic category. This table excludes Latinos from the racial categories and assigns them to a separate category. Hispanics/Latinos may be of any race.
Race / Ethnicity (NH = Non-Hispanic)	Pop 2000	Pop 2010	Pop 2020	% 2000	% 2010	% 2020
White alone (NH)	22	31	2	2.48%	4.38%	0.31%
Black or African American alone (NH)	837	660	615	94.36%	93.95%	96.09%
Native American or Alaska Native alone (NH)	1	1	1	0.11%	0.14%	0.16%
Asian alone (NH)	0	1	4	0.00%	0.14%	0.63%
Native Hawaiian or Pacific Islander alone (NH)	0	0	0	0.00%	0.00%	0.00%
Other race alone (NH)	0	0	0	0.00%	0.00%	0.00%
Mixed race or Multiracial (NH)	6	2	15	0.68%	0.28%	2.34%
Hispanic or Latino (any race)	21	12	3	2.37%	1.70%	0.47%
Total	887	707	640	100.00%	100.00%	100.00%

=== 2020 census ===
As of the 2020 United States census, there were 640 people, 393 households, and 312 families residing in the CDP.

=== 2000 census ===
As of the census of 2000, there were 887 people, 319 households, and 221 families residing in the CDP. The population density was 2,846.8 inhabitants per square mile (1,099.2/km^{2}). There were 370 housing units at an average density of 1,187.5 per square mile (458.5/km^{2}). The racial makeup of the CDP was 2.48% White, 94.48% African American, 0.11% Native American, 2.14% from other races, and 0.79% from two or more races. Hispanic or Latino of any race were 2.37% of the population.

There were 319 households, out of which 31.0% had children under the age of 18 living with them, 33.5% were married couples living together, 31.3% had a female householder with no husband present, and 30.7% were non-families. 27.0% of all households were made up of individuals, and 9.7% had someone living alone who was 65 years of age or older. The average household size was 2.78 and the average family size was 3.41.

In the CDP, the population was spread out, with 31.0% under the age of 18, 8.6% from 18 to 24, 28.5% from 25 to 44, 20.7% from 45 to 64, and 11.2% who were 65 years of age or older. The median age was 33 years. For every 100 females, there were 83.6 males. For every 100 females age 18 and over, there were 78.9 males.

The median income for a household in the CDP was $18,000, and the median income for a family was $22,589. Males had a median income of $18,208 versus $20,398 for females. The per capita income for the CDP was $8,237. About 26.3% of families and 33.6% of the population were below the poverty line, including 41.9% of those under age 18 and 39.6% of those age 65 or over.
