= Bolen, Georgia =

Unincorporated community in Georgia, U.S.

Coordinates: 31°23′24″N 82°27′51″W

Bolen is an unincorporated community in Ware County, in the U.S. state of Georgia.

== History ==
A post office called Bolen was established in 1886, and remained in operation until 1913. The community had a depot on the Nicholls and Waycross division of the Atlantic and Birmingham Railroad.
