= Sunsweet, Georgia =

Unincorporated community in Georgia, U.S.

Coordinates: 31°34′10″N 83°33′57″W

Sunsweet is an unincorporated community in Tift County, in the U.S. state of Georgia.

== History ==
The community was named for the local sun-ripened peach crop. A variant name was "Irby". A post office called Irby was established in 1890, and remained in operation until 1909.
