= Mineola, Georgia =

Unincorporated community in Georgia, U.S.

Coordinates: 30°54′28″N 83°20′37″W

Mineola is an unincorporated community in Lowndes County, in the U.S. state of Georgia.

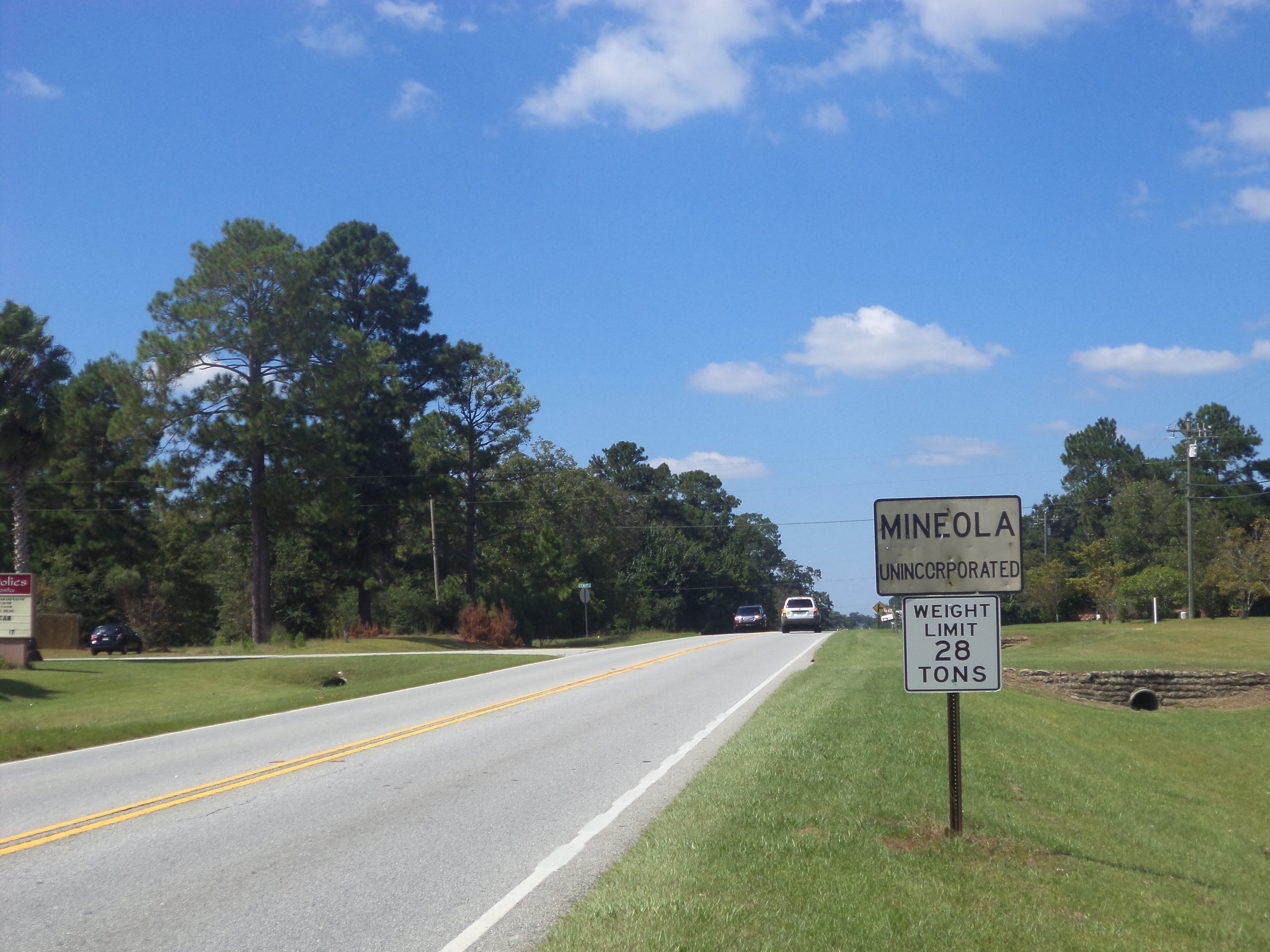
Mineola sign on Old U.S. Route 41

== History ==
A post office called Mineola was established in 1889 along the route of the newly completed Georgia Southern and Florida Railway, and remained in operation until 1920. "Mineola" is a name derived from an unidentified Native American language meaning "much water".
