= Unionville, Georgia =

- Unincorporated community Census-designated place
- Location in Tift County and the state of Georgia
- Coordinates: 31°26′7″N 83°30′32″W
- Country: United States
- State: Georgia
- County: Tift

Area
  - Total: 0.75 sq mi (1.95 km^{2})
  - Land: 0.75 sq mi (1.95 km^{2})
  - Water: 0 sq mi (0.00 km^{2})
- Elevation: 351 ft (107 m)

Population (2020)
  - Total: 1,688
  - Density: 2,247.5/sq mi (867.75/km^{2})
- Time zone: UTC-5 (Eastern (EST))
  - Summer (DST): UTC-4 (EDT)
- ZIP code: 31794
- Area code: 229
- FIPS code: 13-78464
- GNIS feature ID: 0333309

Unionville is an unincorporated community and census-designated place (CDP) in Tift County, Georgia, United States. As of the 2020 census, Unionville had a population of 1,688.

== History ==
Unionville took its name in the 1880s from the Union Lumber Company.

== Geography ==
Unionville is located at 31°26′7″N 83°30′32″W (31.435302, -83.508824). According to the United States Census Bureau, the CDP has a total area of 0.8 square miles (2.1 km^{2}), all land.

== Demographics ==
Historical population
Census	Pop.	Note	%±
1960	1,607		—
1970	1,646		2.4%
1980	1,942		18.0%
1990	2,710		39.5%
2000	2,074		−23.5%
2010	1,845		−11.0%
2020	1,688		−8.5%
U.S. Decennial Census; 1850-1870 1870-1880; 1890-1910 1920-1930; 1940 1950 1960; 1970 1980 1990; 2000 2010 2020

In the 1950 U.S. census, Unionville was part of the census-defined Unionville-Phillipsburg unincorporated place with population of 2,770. In the 1960 U.S. census, the two communities were separated with Unionville having a population of 1,607 and then designated a census designated place in 1980.

=== Racial and ethnic composition ===
Unionville, Georgia – Racial and ethnic composition Note: the US Census treats Hispanic/Latino as an ethnic category. This table excludes Latinos from the racial categories and assigns them to a separate category. Hispanics/Latinos may be of any race.
Race / Ethnicity (NH = Non-Hispanic)	Pop 2000	Pop 2010	Pop 2020	% 2000	% 2010	% 2020
White alone (NH)	30	17	22	1.45%	0.92%	1.30%
Black or African American alone (NH)	2,004	1,768	1,598	96.62%	95.83%	94.67%
Native American or Alaska Native alone (NH)	1	6	3	0.05%	0.33%	0.18%
Asian alone (NH)	1	2	0	0.05%	0.11%	0.00%
Native Hawaiian or Pacific Islander alone (NH)	0	0	0	0.00%	0.00%	0.00%
Other race alone (NH)	0	1	0	0.00%	0.05%	0.00%
Mixed race or Multiracial (NH)	14	10	30	0.68%	0.54%	1.78%
Hispanic or Latino (any race)	24	41	35	1.16%	2.22%	2.07%
Total	2,074	1,845	1,688	100.00%	100.00%	100.00%

=== 2020 census ===
As of the 2020 census, Unionville had a population of 1,688 and 318 families residing in the CDP.

The median age was 42.3 years. 22.5% of residents were under the age of 18 and 19.8% of residents were 65 years of age or older. For every 100 females there were 83.5 males, and for every 100 females age 18 and over there were 81.4 males age 18 and over.

100.0% of residents lived in urban areas, while 0.0% lived in rural areas.

There were 682 households in Unionville, of which 30.1% had children under the age of 18 living in them. Of all households, 25.1% were married-couple households, 22.9% were households with a male householder and no spouse or partner present, and 45.9% were households with a female householder and no spouse or partner present. About 30.3% of all households were made up of individuals and 13.1% had someone living alone who was 65 years of age or older.

There were 794 housing units, of which 14.1% were vacant. The homeowner vacancy rate was 2.5% and the rental vacancy rate was 4.0%.

=== 2000 census ===
At the 2000 census, there were 2,074 people, 750 households and 521 families residing in the CDP. The population density was 2,766.6 inhabitants per square mile (1,068.2/km^{2}). There were 859 housing units at an average density of 1,145.9 per square mile (442.4/km^{2}). The racial makeup of the CDP was 1.45% White, 96.96% African American, 0.05% Native American, 0.05% Asian, 0.68% from other races, and 0.82% from two or more races. Hispanic or Latino of any race were 1.16% of the population.

There were 750 households, of which 30.5% had children under the age of 18 living with them, 32.3% were married couples living together, 30.8% had a female householder with no husband present, and 30.5% were non-families. 25.5% of all households were made up of individuals, and 11.3% had someone living alone who was 65 years of age or older. The average household size was 2.77 and the average family size was 3.37.

29.2% of the population were under the age of 18, 10.2% from 18 to 24, 26.0% from 25 to 44, 21.3% from 45 to 64, and 13.4% who were 65 years of age or older. The median age was 34 years. For every 100 females, there were 87.0 males. For every 100 females age 18 and over, there were 75.7 males.

The median household income was $23,430 and the median family income was $23,372. Males had a median income of $22,143 compared with $19,223 for females. The per capita income was $11,699. About 33.4% of families and 33.1% of the population were below the poverty line, including 36.3% of those under age 18 and 32.2% of those age 65 or over.

=== Income and poverty ===
In 2010, Unionville had the 17th-lowest median household income of all places in the United States with a population over 1,000.
