= Coolidge, Georgia =

- City
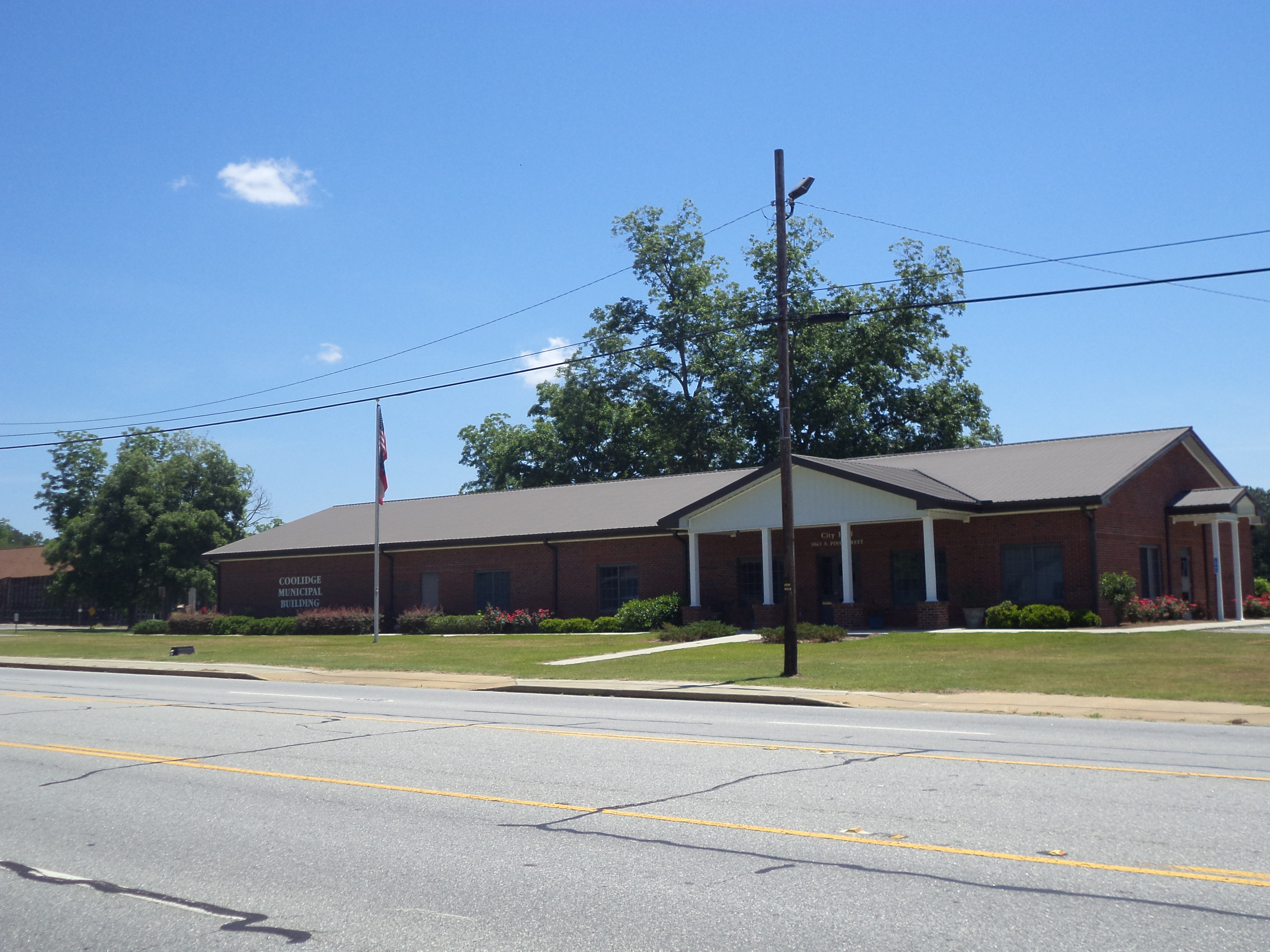
- Coolidge City Hall Municipal Building

- Location in Thomas County and the state of Georgia
- Coordinates: 31°0′39″N 83°52′0″W
- Country: United States
- State: Georgia
- County: Thomas

Area
  - Total: 0.82 sq mi (2.12 km^{2})
  - Land: 0.82 sq mi (2.12 km^{2})
  - Water: 0.0039 sq mi (0.01 km^{2})
- Elevation: 249 ft (76 m)

Population (2020)
  - Total: 528
  - Density: 646.6/sq mi (249.64/km^{2})
- Time zone: UTC-5 (Eastern (EST))
  - Summer (DST): UTC-4 (EDT)
- ZIP code: 31738
- Area code: 229
- FIPS code: 13-19392
- GNIS feature ID: 0331455
- Website: https://coolidgega.com/

Coolidge is a city in Thomas County, Georgia, United States. The population was 528 in 2020.

== History ==
Coolidge had its start in 1900 when the Tifton, Thomasville and Gulf Railway was extended to that point. The community was named after a railroad official. The Georgia General Assembly incorporated the place in 1901 as the "Town of Coolidge".

== Geography ==
Coolidge is located at 31°0′39″N 83°52′0″W (31.010744, -83.866594). According to the United States Census Bureau, the city has a total area of 0.8 square miles (2.1 km^{2}), all land.

== Demographics ==
Historical population
Census	Pop.	Note	%±
1910	303		—
1920	485		60.1%
1930	498		2.7%
1940	608		22.1%
1950	764		25.7%
1960	679		−11.1%
1970	717		5.6%
1980	736		2.6%
1990	610		−17.1%
2000	552		−9.5%
2010	525		−4.9%
2020	528		0.6%
U.S. Decennial Census; 1850-1870 1870-1880; 1890-1910 1920-1930; 1940 1950 1960; 1970 1980 1990; 2000 2010

As of the census of 2000, there were 552 people, 218 households, and 137 families residing in the city. In 2020, its population declined to 528.

== Notable people ==
Ken Terrell - Hollywood stuntman and minor actor, born in Coolidge.

Mike Keown - Former candidate for U.S. House of Representatives and current Baptist minister.

Ryan Fitzgerald - American football kicker for the Carolina Panthers of the NFL.
