= Macon and Birmingham Railway =

The Macon and Birmingham Railway (M&B) was a railroad in the southeastern United States that operated from 1891 through 1922. The railroad was chartered on December 26, 1888, by the Macon Construction Company and completed in 1891 before the company went into receivership. In 1902 the line was acquired by the Georgia Southern and Florida Railway, which was affiliated with the Southern Railway. The railroad was abandoned by the GS&F between 1922 and 1923.
