= Chula, Georgia =

- Unincorporated community
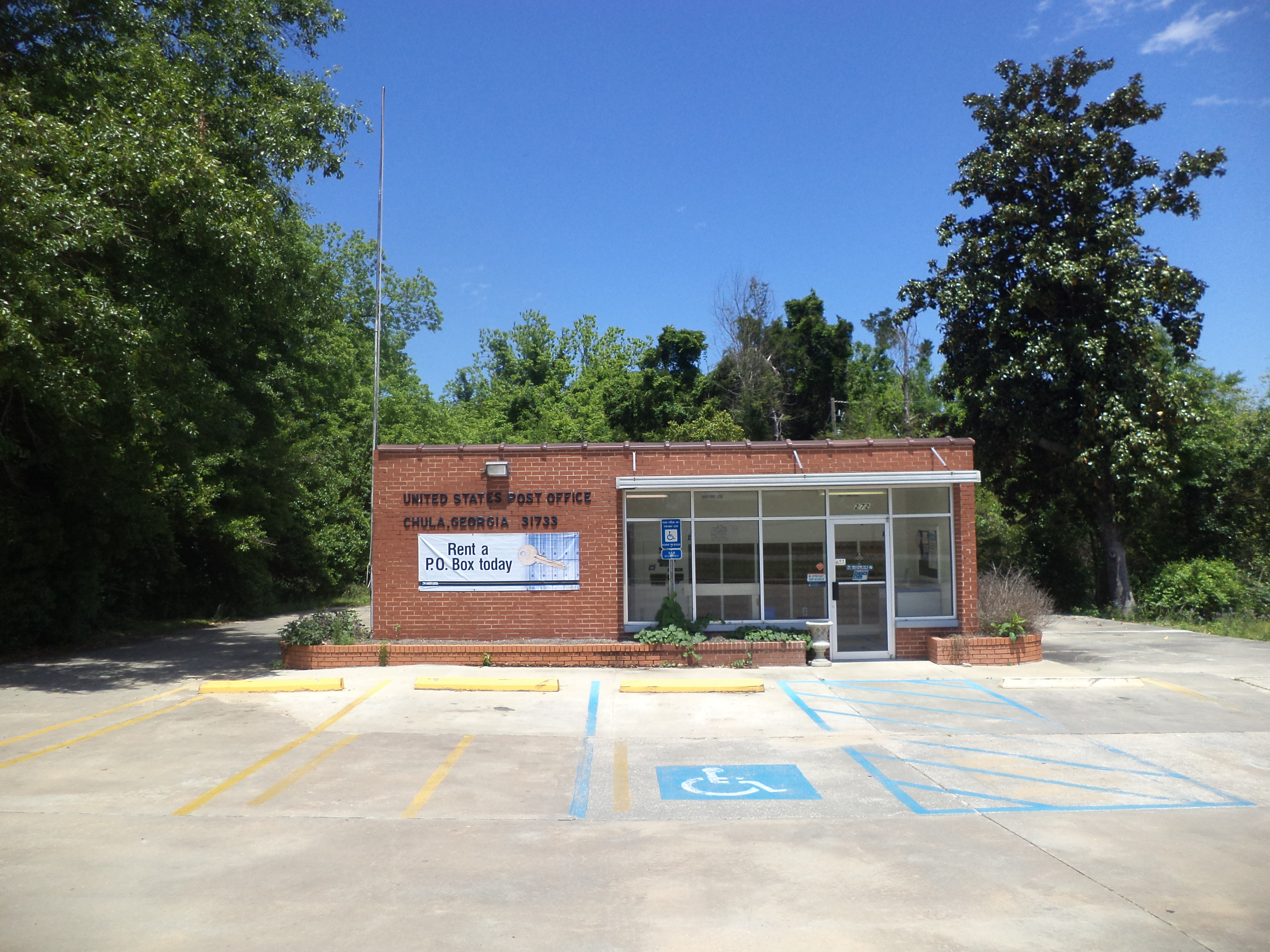
- Post office

- Location within Georgia
- Coordinates: 31°32′59″N 83°32′51″W
- Country: United States
- State: Georgia
- County: Tift
- Elevation: 384 ft (117 m)
- Time zone: UTC-5 (Eastern (EST))
  - Summer (DST): UTC-4 (EDT)
- ZIP code: 31733
- Area code: 229
- GNIS feature ID: 355165

Chula is an unincorporated community in Tift County, Georgia, United States. The community is located along U.S. Route 41 near Interstate 75, 7.2 miles (11.6 km) north-northwest of Tifton. Chula has a post office with ZIP code 31733.

== History ==
An early variant name was "Ruby". The Georgia General Assembly incorporated the place in 1904 as the "Town of Chula". The town's municipal charter was repealed in 1906.
