= Laconte, Georgia =

Unincorporated community in Georgia, U.S.

Coordinates: 31°12′48″N 83°26′57″W

Laconte is an unincorporated community in Cook County, in the U.S. state of Georgia.

== History ==
Laconte was platted about 1853. A post office called Laconte was established in 1888, and remained in operation until 1905.

== See also ==
- Laconte
