= Fairfax, Georgia =

Unincorporated community in Georgia, U.S.

Coordinates: 31°15′38″N 82°36′28″W

Fairfax is an unincorporated community in Ware County, in the U.S. state of Georgia.

== History ==
A post office called Fairfax was established in 1900, and remained in operation until 1943.

The Georgia General Assembly incorporated the place in 1907 as the "Town of Fairfax". The town's municipal charter was repealed about 20 years later.
