= Brookfield, Georgia =

- Unincorporated community
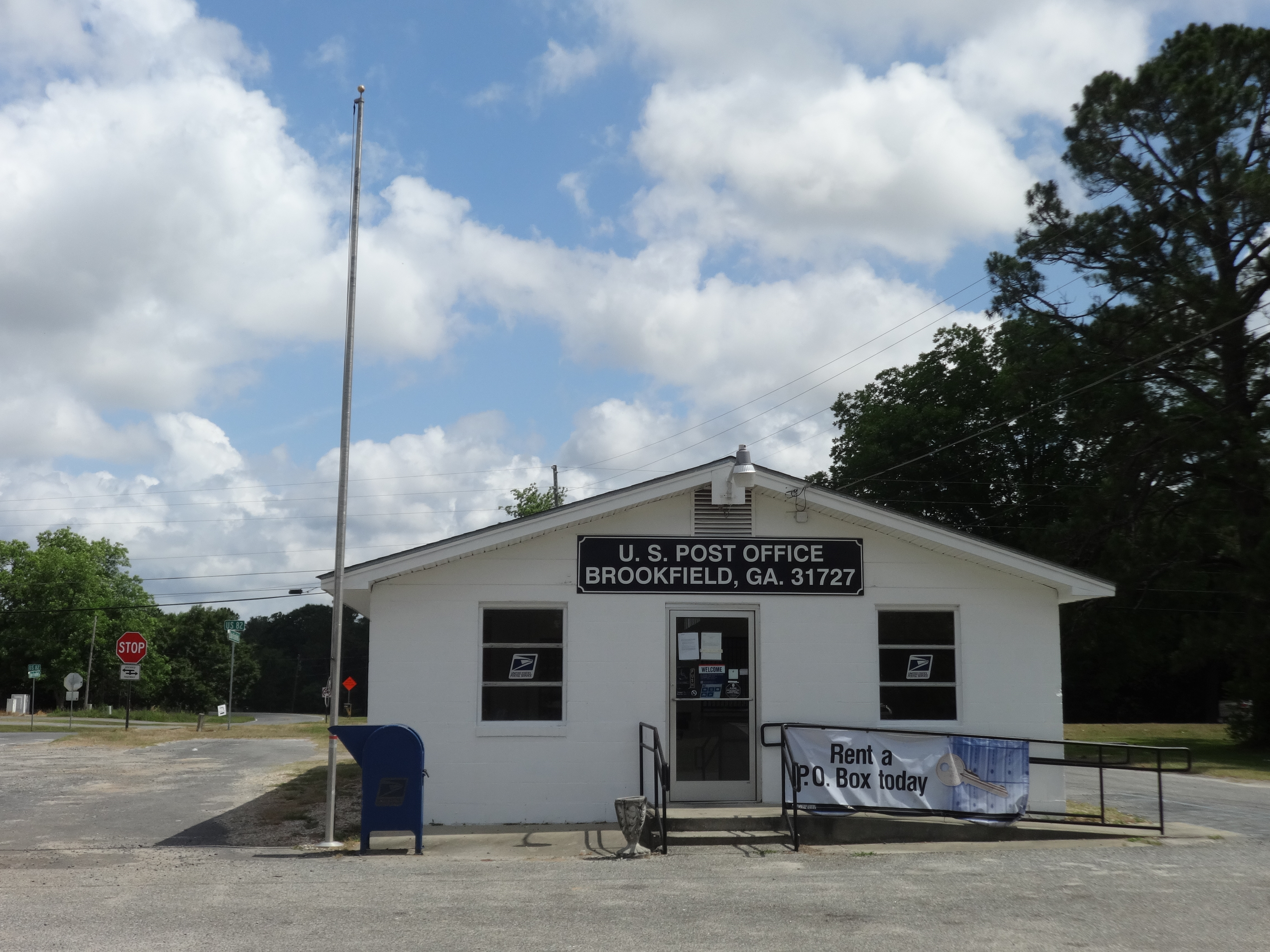
- Post office

- Location within Georgia
- Coordinates: 31°25′07″N 83°23′28″W
- Country: United States
- State: Georgia
- County: Tift
- Elevation: 331 ft (101 m)
- Time zone: UTC-5 (Eastern (EST))
  - Summer (DST): UTC-4 (EDT)
- ZIP code: 31727
- Area code: 229
- GNIS feature ID: 311826

Brookfield is an unincorporated community in Tift County, Georgia, United States. The community is located along U.S. Route 82, 7.3 miles (11.7 km) east-southeast of Tifton. Brookfield has a post office with ZIP code 31727.

== History ==
Brookfield had its start in 1870 when a sawmill was established there. A post office has been in operation at Brookfield since 1874. The community was so named for a brook near the original town site.
