= Georgia, Ashburn, Sylvester and Camilla Railway =

Railway in Georgia

The Georgia, Ashburn, Sylvester and Camilla Railway was founded in 1922 and operated a former line of the failed Gulf Line Railway from Ashburn, Georgia to Camilla, Georgia. The GAS&C was a subsidiary of the Georgia Northern Railway which was purchased by the Southern Railway in 1966 and operated as a subsidiary. The railroad used steam locomotives until 1948 when it was replaced by a diesel. The GAS&C was fully merged into the GN in 1972. A member of the "Pidcock Kingdom" group of railroads, this shortline was known informally by locals as the GAS Line.

There are 3 trains on display on this old route:

1930 Baldwin 2-8-2 (#61291) in Sylvester, GA (GAS&C #100)

1925 Baldwin 2-8-2 (#58361) in Camilla, GA (Southern Railway #9)

1929 Baldwin 2-8-2 (#60736) in Moultrie, GA (Georgia Northern Railway #105)
