= Worth, Georgia =

Unincorporated community in Georgia, U.S.

Coordinates: 31°45′03″N 83°40′33″W

Worth is an unincorporated community in Turner County, in the U.S. state of Georgia.

== History ==
A post office called Worth was established in 1890, and remained in operation until 1931.

The Georgia General Assembly incorporated Worth in 1910. The town's municipal charter was repealed in 1943.
