= Atlanta, Birmingham and Atlantic Railway =

American railway company

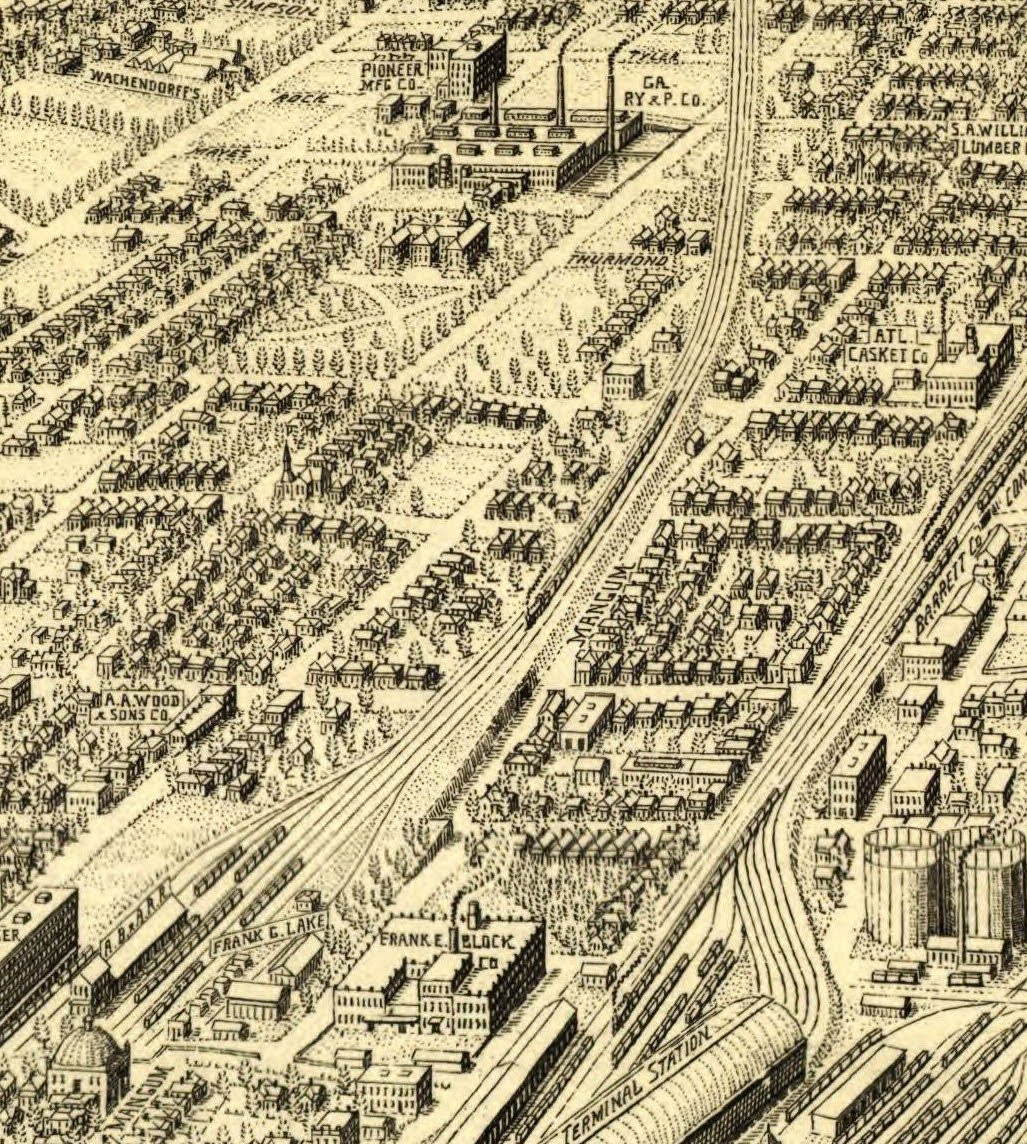
- The company's Mangum Street embankment west of Downtown Atlanta included a factory with smokestacks

Overview
- Headquarters: Atlanta, Georgia, U.S.
- Reporting mark: AB&A
- Locale: Alabama; Georgia
- Dates of operation: 1914–1926
- Successor: Atlanta, Birmingham and Coast Railroad

Technical
- Track gauge: 4 ft 8 1/2 in (1,435 mm) standard gauge
- Length: 340 miles (550 kilometres)

The Atlanta, Birmingham and Atlantic Railway (reporting mark AB&A) was formed in 1914 as a reorganization of the Atlanta, Birmingham and Atlantic Railroad, which had been created in 1905 to purchase the Atlantic and Birmingham Railway and extend its track into Birmingham, Alabama, from an end point at Montezuma, Georgia. The railroad's chief engineer and general manager at the time was Alexander Bonnyman.

The railroad went into receivership in 1921 and was acquired by the Atlantic Coast Line Railroad in 1926. They reorganized the line as the Atlanta, Birmingham and Coast Railroad.

The Mangum Street embankment which ran north–south along Mangum Street (parallel to today's Northside Drive, but two blocks to the east), upon which trains reached the Atlanta terminus west of Downtown Atlanta, was built in 1905 and razed c. 1990 for construction of the Georgia Dome.

The building was used as offices and passenger terminal for the AB&A in Atlanta is located at the corner of Fairlie and Walton Streets in downtown Atlanta. It is now used as offices for Central Atlanta Progress. The upper facade of the building retains the "Atlanta, Birmingham & Atlantic Railroad" stonework on two sides.
