= Atlanta, Birmingham and Coast Railroad =

Company in United States

Atlanta, Birmingham & Coast Railroad
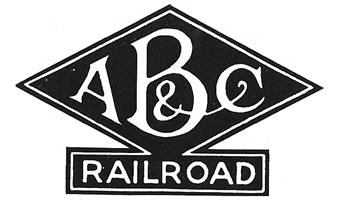

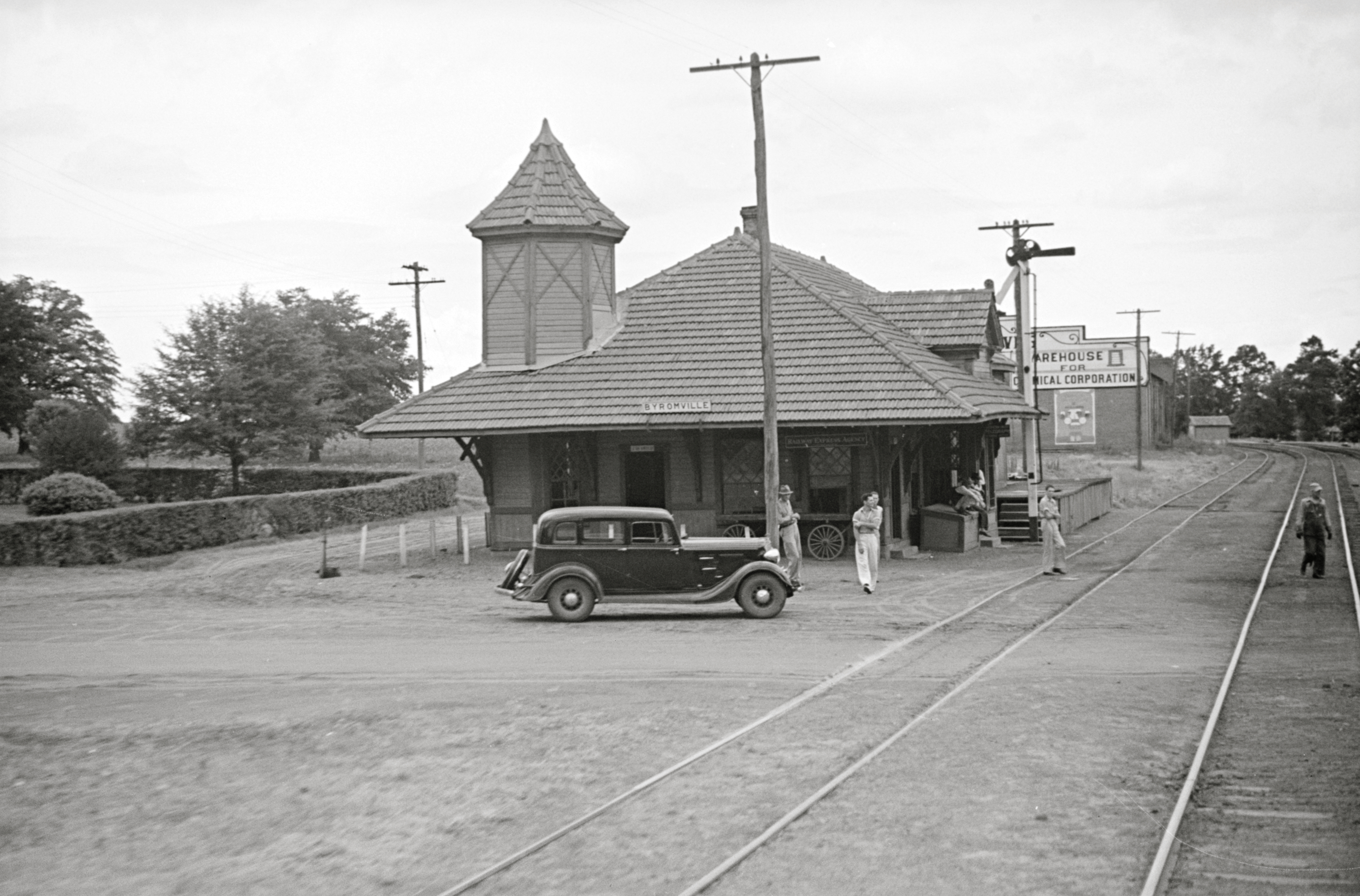
- The railroad's Byromville, Georgia station in 1938

Overview
- Headquarters: Atlanta, Georgia, U.S.
- Reporting mark: AB&C
- Locale: Alabama; Georgia
- Dates of operation: 1887–1945
- Successor: Atlantic Coast Line Railroad

Technical
- Track gauge: 4 ft 8 1/2 in (1,435 mm) standard gauge
- Length: 640 miles (1,030 kilometres)

The Atlanta, Birmingham and Coast Railroad (reporting mark AB&C) was organized in 1926 to replace the bankrupt Atlanta, Birmingham and Atlantic Railway. The AB&C was controlled by the Atlantic Coast Line Railroad, which owned a majority of the stock. In 1944 it reported 763 million net ton-miles of revenue freight and 33 million passenger-miles; at the end of that year it operated 639 miles of road and 836 miles of track (the main trackage plus all sidings, spurs, terminal tracks, and shared tracks).

== Passenger services ==
The AB&C operated daily freight and passenger trains between its northern endpoints, Atlanta and Birmingham, and its southern ones, Brunswick, Waycross, and Thomasville. Passenger trains from Atlanta used Terminal Station until November 1933, when the AB&C moved to Atlanta Union Station. Other southbound trains left Birmingham from the AB&C's own Eleventh Street station there. The two northern branches joined at Manchester to form a single main line to the small port city of Brunswick, on the Atlantic coast.

A branch from the main line at Fitzgerald ran 80 miles southwesterly to Thomasville, while another branch carried trains to Waycross for connection with the Atlantic Coast Line to the Florida railroad hub of Jacksonville, 75 miles away. This latter branch was by far the most heavily used for both freight and passenger service.

From January 1936, the AB&C was a link in the route of the Chicago-Miami Dixieland. which ran in the winter season only, carrying coaches and Pullmans between Atlanta and Waycross. And beginning in January 1940, the AB&C also carried the Dixie Flagler, a new, streamlined all-coach train that ran every third day, one of a trio of streamliners that provided daily service between Chicago and Miami via multiple railroads over three different routes. The route via the AB&C was the shortest of all three, a total of 1455 miles, covered in 29 1/2 hours.

== Acquisition ==
In 1946 the AB&C was merged into the ACL, becoming the latter company's Western Division.

== Bibliography ==
- Goolsby, Larry. Atlantic, Birmingham & Coast. ACL&SAL Historical Society. 2000.
- Storey, Steve; Ray, David; McDaniel, Matt (November 2018). Historic Railroads of Georgia: A Historic Context Study and Evaluation of Georgia's Historic Railroads Appendix A: Atlanta, Birmingham & Coast Railroad (PDF) (Report). Archived (PDF) from the original on February 21, 2022.
