= Rewound =

Rewound may refer to:

- Atlanta Rewound
- Birmingham Rewound
- Huntsville Rewound

== See also ==
- Rewind (disambiguation)
