= Birmingham Rewound =

Birmingham Rewound logo.

Birmingham Rewound is an ongoing non-profit website established with the goal of documenting memories from the Birmingham, Alabama area in the United States. The site debuted in January 2005 in response to the Birmingham community’s interest in preserving local history. Russell Wells is the webmaster, with Tim Hollis assisting in providing local data and historical information. Hollis has written several books on the Birmingham area and Southeast Culture. Monthly features appear on the Birmingham Rewound website on various topics of local interest, including local newspaper articles and memories. The site has over 10,000 visits a month from people worldwide. The Alabama Broadcasters Association has recognized the site as a valuable database of Huntsville Metro TV/radio information.

== See also ==
- Huntsville Rewound, a spin-off site, covers the Huntsville metropolitan area
- Atlanta Rewound, a spin-off site, covers the Atlanta metropolitan area
- Alabama Broadcasters Association maintain a database of Birmingham-area TV/radio information.
