= Huntsville Rewound =

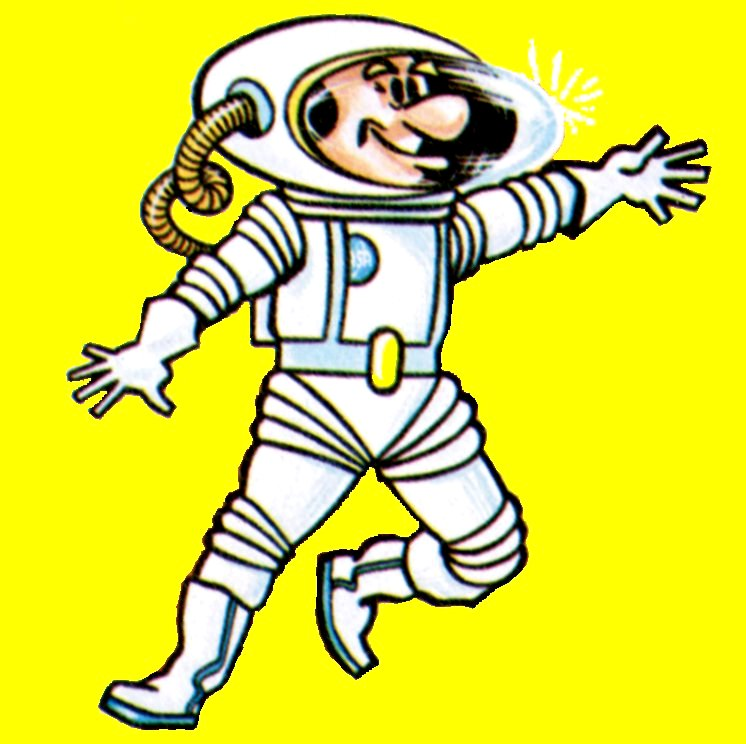
Huntsville Rewound logo.

Huntsville Rewound is an ongoing non-profit project to collect memories from the Huntsville, Alabama, USA TV market. It is a website and Facebook page covering the northern Alabama area along with Tennessee border counties. The website was set up in September 2009 following the response from the Facebook page (which started in July 2009 as Tennessee Valley Rewound) and the Birmingham Rewound site. Lance George is the webmaster and site curator. The Facebook site has over 12,700 members (4/3/23). The Facebook page is interactive and allows users to upload pictures and give comments. Features appear on the Huntsville Rewound website quarterly on topics of regional interest. Portions of the Huntsville Rewound and Atlanta Rewound websites actually are derived from the "Lance George Personal Website" which started compilation in July 1996 and hosts family heirlooms and collectibles dating back to the early 20th century.

The site has over 5,000 hits a month from around the world. The Birmingham Rewound website mentions the

pictures, video, and Facebook integration that this site has. The Alabama Broadcasters Association has linked this site as being an excellent database of Huntsville metro TV/radio information.

Features on the Huntsville Rewound website include Benny Carle-Classic Alabama TV, Grunches and Grins TV show, Space City USA (an amusement park that never opened), Huntsville children's TV shows, Keller Drawbridge (Decatur), Huntsville radio and TV history, Memorial Parkway, First National Bank Building (Huntsville), the Keller car, and a time machine (ads and memories from a year in the past). Huntsville Rewound is not related to the Huntsville Revisited Facebook Group that began in 2011.

== See also ==
- Atlanta Rewound, a spin-off site, covers the Atlanta metropolitan area
- Birmingham Rewound covers the Birmingham metropolitan area
