= List of metropolitan areas of Alabama =

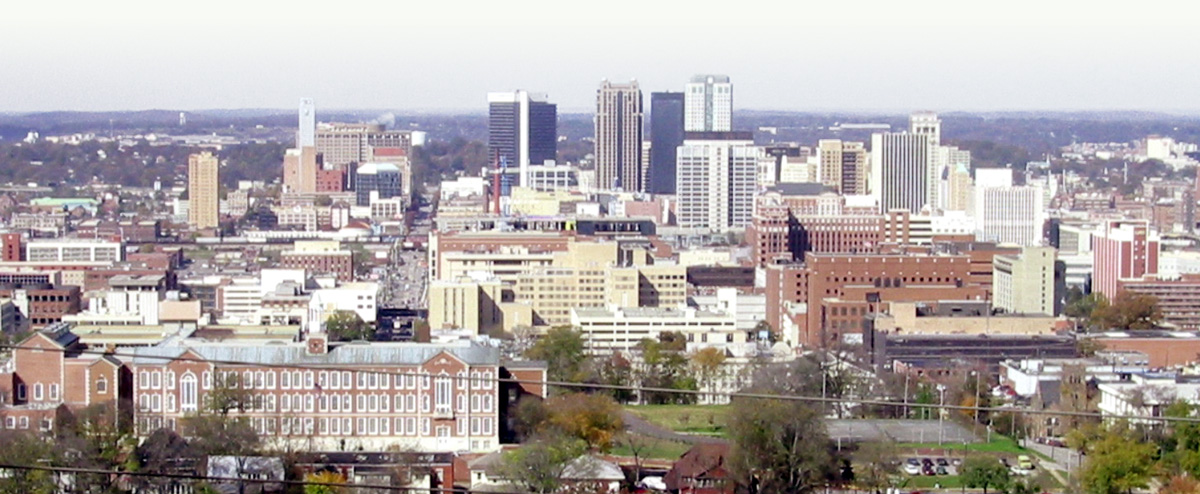
Birmingham, largest metropolitan area

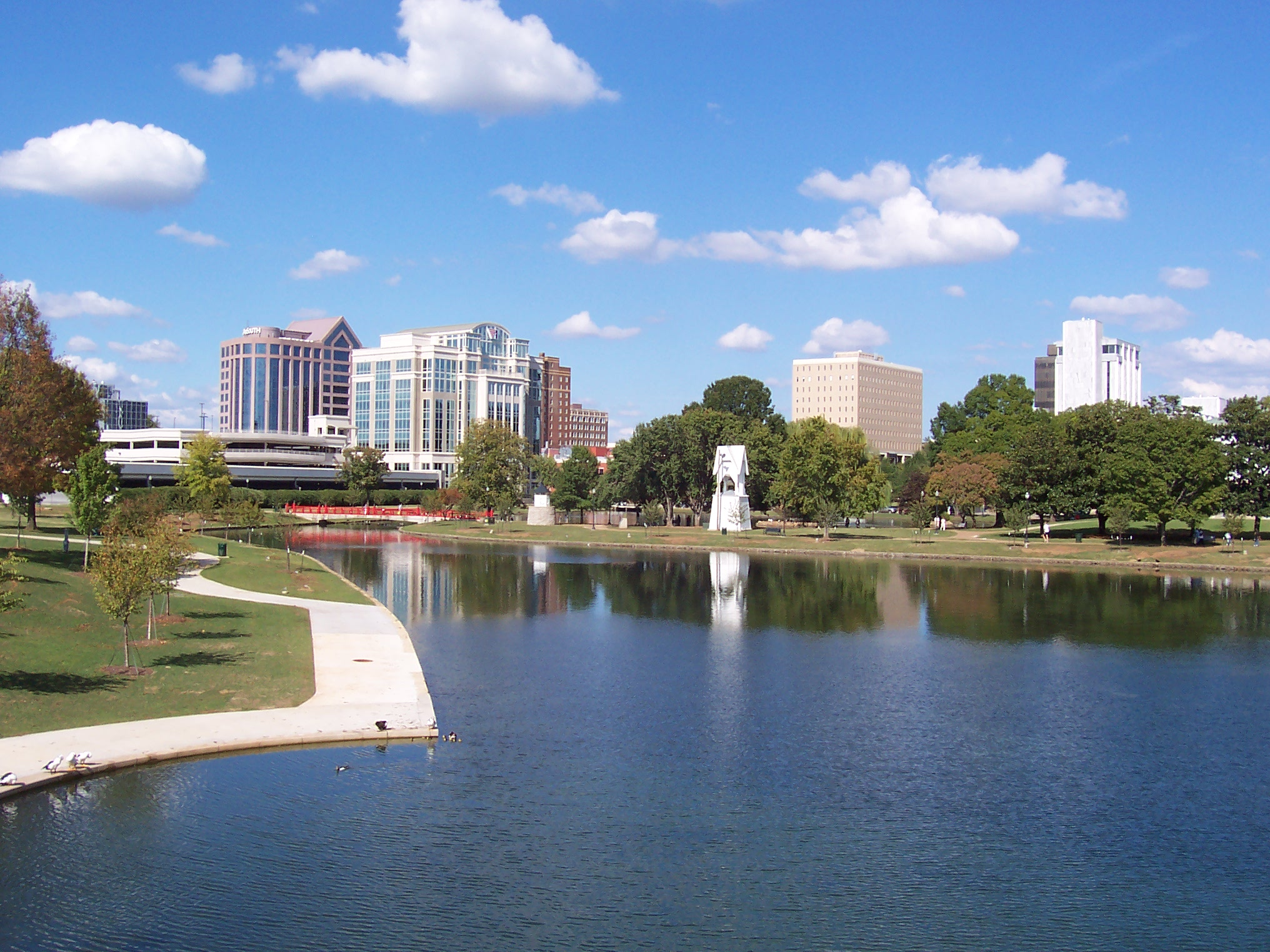
Huntsville, largest city and second largest metropolitan area

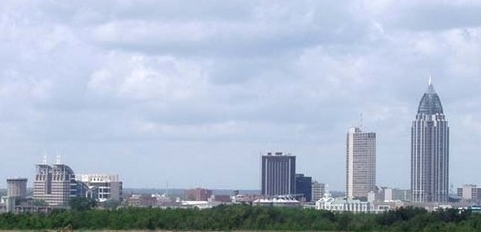
Mobile, third largest metropolitan area

The following is a list of the largest metropolitan areas in the US state of Alabama. As of 2020, Birmingham has the biggest metropolitan area and urban area in Alabama followed by Huntsville. The table data is from the US census in 2010 and 2020.

Rank	Metropolitan Area	Population (2020 census)	Population (2010 census)
1	Birmingham	1,091,921	1,061,024
2	Huntsville	481,681	417,593
3	Mobile	428,692	430,573
4	Montgomery	386,047	374,536
5	Tuscaloosa	253,211	239,207
6	Daphne-Fairhope-Foley	229,287	182,265
7	Auburn	193,773	161,699
8	Decatur	152,740	152,829
9	Dothan	150,214	145,639
10	Florence-Muscle Shoals	148,779	147,137
11	Anniston-Oxford	113,469	118,572
12	Gadsden	102,371	104,430

Rank	Combined Statistical area	Population (2020 census)	Population (2010 census)
1	Birmingham-Hoover-Talladega, AL	1,361,033	1,302,283
2	Huntsville-Decatur-Albertville, AL-TN	852,756	664,441
3	Mobile-Daphne-Fairhope, AL	646,576	595,257
4	Columbus-Auburn-Opelika, GA-AL	563,967	469,327
5	Montgomery-Selma, AL	424,509	418,356
6	Dothan-Enterprise-Ozark, AL	253,798	245,838

== See also ==
- Alabama statistical areas
- List of metropolitan statistical areas
- List of combined statistical areas
