= Keller (automobile) =

Defunct American motor vehicle manufacturer

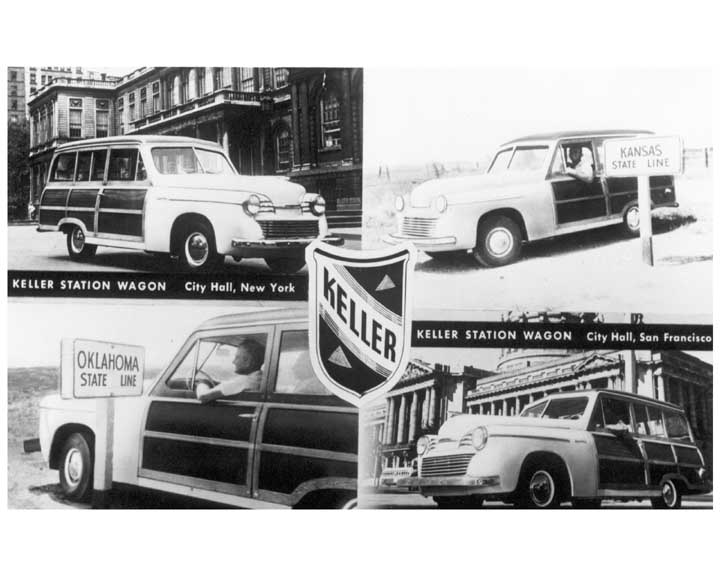
1948 Keller Super Chief.

The Keller was an automobile produced by the Keller Motors Corporation of Huntsville, Alabama, United States, between 1947 and 1950. It was based on the earlier Bobbi-Kar produced by the Bobbi Motor Car Corp. of San Diego, California. Keller Motors restyled the Bobbi-Kar and switched power from a 64.9 cu in (1.1 L) 25 hp (19 kW) four-cylinder to Hercules engines of 133 cu in (2.2 L) 49 hp (37 kW) and 162 cu in (2.7 L).

== History ==
A great deal of the franchise money was spent on development of John Liefeld's original Bobbi-Kar design. (Liefeld was a 32-year-old former Chrysler engineer who'd spent the war years at Convair.) This design was originally developed in Bobbi-Kar's San Diego facility and then the company and key employees moved to Birmingham, Alabama, which company President S.A. Williams deemed was a more business friendly location. In late 1946/early 1947 a coup was undertaken by the Bobbi-Kar management team and George D. Keller, a former Sales VP for Studebaker Corporation. Keller took over as President, replacing Williams. In mid-1947 the Wartime Assets Administration was eager to lease empty WWII surplus chemical munitions manufacturing buildings located at Huntsville Arsenal (now Redstone Arsenal) in Huntsville, Alabama. They made Keller Motors an attractive lease deal they felt Keller could not refuse. In mid-1947 company assets were loaded into railroad boxcars and were quickly moved to Buildings 471 and 481 on Redstone Arsenal in Huntsville. These two buildings later (renamed 4471 and 4481) became key buildings at the Marshall Space Flight Center and were used to design and build rocket and propulsion systems that eventually sent man to the Moon. (These two buildings were demolished in 2014).

Only eighteen Kellers were produced in Huntsville before the death of George D. Keller brought an end to production. They had a short wheelbase of 94 in (2,388 mm) and a 3-speed transmission. Along with the Huntsville location, Keller also staffed another office in Detroit, close to the center of the auto industry. Keller was unsure about Liefeld's design, and demanded that friends of his, qualified engineers from Chrysler, Packard and Studebaker, should look over every aspect of the prototypes. In addition, since the Bobbi-Kar, and hence the Keller, had been deliberately designed to use as many off-the-shelf parts as possible, it made good sense to have a Detroit office in direct contact with the suppliers, most of whom were clustered around the Big Three.

Keller Motors soon had a staff of nearly 70 designers, engineers and purchasing agents on the payroll. According to Liefeld, in the aftermath of the unfavorable publicity that swirled around the Tucker, Davis and Playboy stock schemes, the SEC kept a close watch on Keller Motors. In order to prove that the company did in fact intend to make cars, Liefeld was required to obtain quadruplicate copies of all design drawings, purchase orders and letters of commitment from suppliers, noting exactly what parts, how many and when they would supply these items to Keller. The actual design of the car was changed very little over the years except that the rear-engine roadster was dropped in favor of a conventional convertible to go along with the station wagon that better used proprietary parts.

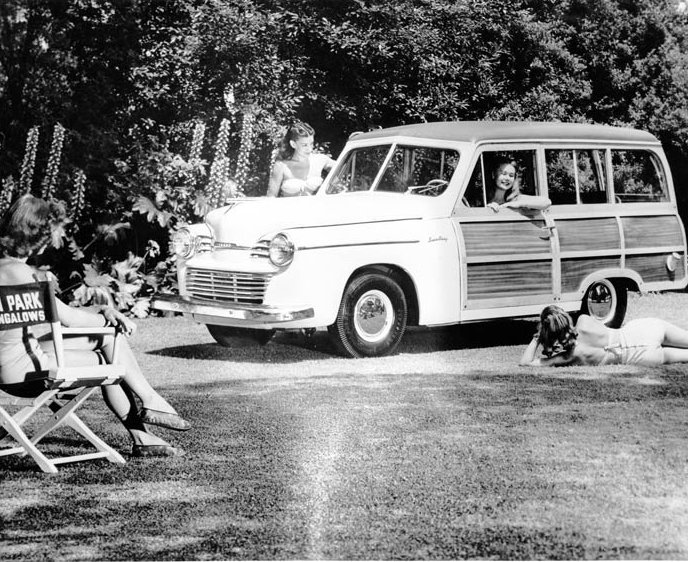
Keller Promotional Picture-1947

According to Liefeld, they received a lot of help from major industry figures, mostly through Keller's auto industry contacts. But the Detroit firms, he says, "were definitely not interested in getting into the small car business. They told us in effect, 'there is a market for a small car, but it is a limited market, and we don't want to touch it unless we're absolutely forced to. We think a small company like yours is the right company to do this and we'll do all we can to help." Unlike Preston Tucker who constantly publicly slammed the safety and quality of the Big Three offerings, Keller maintained a warm and positive relationship with fellow automakers.

Keller's contacts soon gave their approval to Liefeld's straightforward design. The improved and larger Keller "Super Chief" Woodie Station Wagon, it seems, was deemed quite acceptable. The franchise dealer network, too, was rapidly becoming a reality. The real problem, and the principal cause of delay, was the need for some $5 million to pay for production tooling and initial supply of parts. A common stock sale was the only solution. The father of Keller's account executive at Buchanan & Company was the head of Allen and Co., a major stockbroker. He agreed to handle the stock sale, but in turn, subcontracted with Greenfield, Lax & Co., an affiliate of Lehman Brothers, to sell the $5-million worth of stock.

"For a period of two and a half years," says Liefeld, "we were on the defensive with the SEC. Playboy, Tucker, and Davis all had indictments against them. Keller was the only company that, throughout the period, stayed clean. After $130,000 in attorney's fees, the SEC said in effect, 'We're awfully sorry, fellows, you're clean as a whistle."

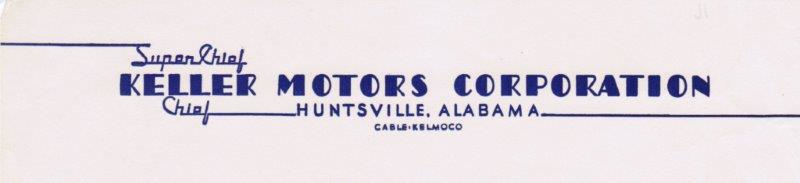
Keller Letterhead-1947

When the final approval was granted, Greenfield, Lax & Co. wasted no time in issuing an extremely detailed prospectus. Dated September 1949, this document indicates that Keller Motors had spent some $1.25 million, divided equally between promotional expenses, design and development, and the establishment of some 1,523 dealer outlets (the final number of dealers signed up was 1,689). In typically-guarded stock prospectus language, the firm indicated that while it had made substantial progress in development, it did not "represent or infer that it has solved the principal problems of the business in which it intends to engage." Recognizing "the development and improvement of an automobile is a process of almost continual change," the corporation modestly admitted that "the final model of the completely designed American automobile has not yet been manufactured, and we do not undertake to do so."

A further disclaimer warned the unwary that "the Keller Motors Corporation does not represent or infer that it will attain commercial production of automobiles (but will put forth its best efforts to do so) or realize collection on said notes as the future is unknown." Throughout the prospectus, as on every dealer franchise agreement and application form, it was stated very clearly that no money would be refunded should the corporation's efforts fail and no cars be sold. This scarcely seems to have deterred investors.

In the prospectus, Keller's rationale for concentrating on a compact Woodie station wagon was elaborated in detail. They argued that the population shift towards the suburbs would guarantee an expanding market for station wagons, a true enough assumption as it turned out. The prospectus pointed out that 110,000 station wagons had been sold in the U.S. in 1948. Keller scheduled production for 16,000 its first year. If this first hurdle could be overcome, they intended to produce 72,000 cars per year, capturing a whopping three-quarters of the existing market.

More realistically, the prospectus did explain that prices of competitors' station wagons were often higher than the sedans upon which they were based. Since Keller planned to concentrate primarily on the construction of station wagons—and small ones at that—their price could be substantially lower. Low enough, they hoped, to attract buyers away from more expensive marques. Keller did admit, however, that such a plan was ambitious, and since low-price competitors (notably Plymouth and Dodge) had already introduced all-steel wagons, this might constitute real competition which "could adversely affect the company's position."

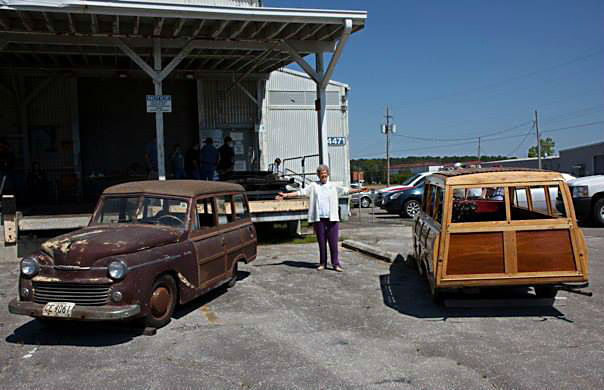
Photo from a "Keller Reunion" in 2013 at the original Keller plant in Huntsville AL.

Actually, building the Keller bodies of wood (mountain ash sourced in Alabama) solved a number of problems. Wood bodies meant that expensive tools and dies would not be needed. Cheap Alabama labor could screw and glue together all the bodies that Keller might use. In addition, of course, Hubert Mitchell already had his rather inadequate Hartselle, Alabama, woodworking plant that he was only too ready to unload on the corporation. At the same time he was supporting the members of the company with personal loans, he sold his furniture factory to the corporation for nearly three times its assessed valuation, a fact brought out only later.

Hubert Mitchell of Hartselle, Alabama, was a major investor in Keller. Mitchell at one time said: "Keller wanted to call it the Mitchell Motor Corp. 'Hell,' I said, 'You're the man. We'll use your name.'" A stock sale for the company in late September 1949 was a success and it seemed Keller was on his way. Company officers celebrated with a festive dinner on October 4. It was not to be. George Keller was late coming to breakfast on October 5 from his room at the Hotel Algonquin. He was found dead in his bed of a heart attack at age 56.

The Keller was originally designed and fabricated primarily by laid-off aircraft technicians post-war, using readily available parts from various automotive and aircraft production facilities. Keller cars are noted for several first-run innovations such as having the engine/flywheel, transmission, clutch, and differential all built into a single unit, noted for its ease of removal and replacement.

Of the 18 original cars manufactured only 4 of these cars still exist as of 2023. 3 are now in the North Alabama area and one is in Colorado. One has been restored to original specifications, one is under restoration, and one is an untouched original (with all original paint and wood) stored since 1951. One in Colorado is being restored by YouTube personality Junkyard Dave. These Keller cars are the oldest cars produced in Alabama still in existence. After Keller's death, the company explored some international ventures, primarily in Belgium, and attempted to market a successor Delmar-Keller Car in San Diego, California. A Keller Super Chief Wagon was displayed at the 1950 Brussels Auto Show as part of an effort to expand international interest.

== See also ==
- Huntsville Rewound, a website covering the Huntsville metropolitan area; includes additional pictures and information.
