= Atlanta Rewound =

Atlanta Rewound logo.

Atlanta Rewound is an ongoing non-profit project that collects memories from the Atlanta, Georgia (U.S. state) media market and publishes them online, both on an independent website, as well as through a Facebook page. The site was set up in May 2010 following the response from the Facebook page, in addition to the Birmingham Rewound and Huntsville Rewound sites. Lance George is the webmaster and site curator.

The Birmingham Rewound website mentions the pictures, videos, and Facebook integration that they have. The Georgia Radio Museum and Hall of Fame have also linked to this site as being an excellent database of Atlanta Metro TV/radio information. Portions of the Atlanta Rewound website are derived from the "Lance George Personal Website" which started compilation in July 1996.

== See also ==
- Birmingham Rewound, covers the Birmingham metropolitan area
- Huntsville Rewound, a spin-off site, covers the Huntsville metropolitan area
