= Dothan–Enterprise–Ozark combined statistical area =

Dothan metropolitan area
- Combined Statistical Area
- Dothan–Enterprise–Ozark
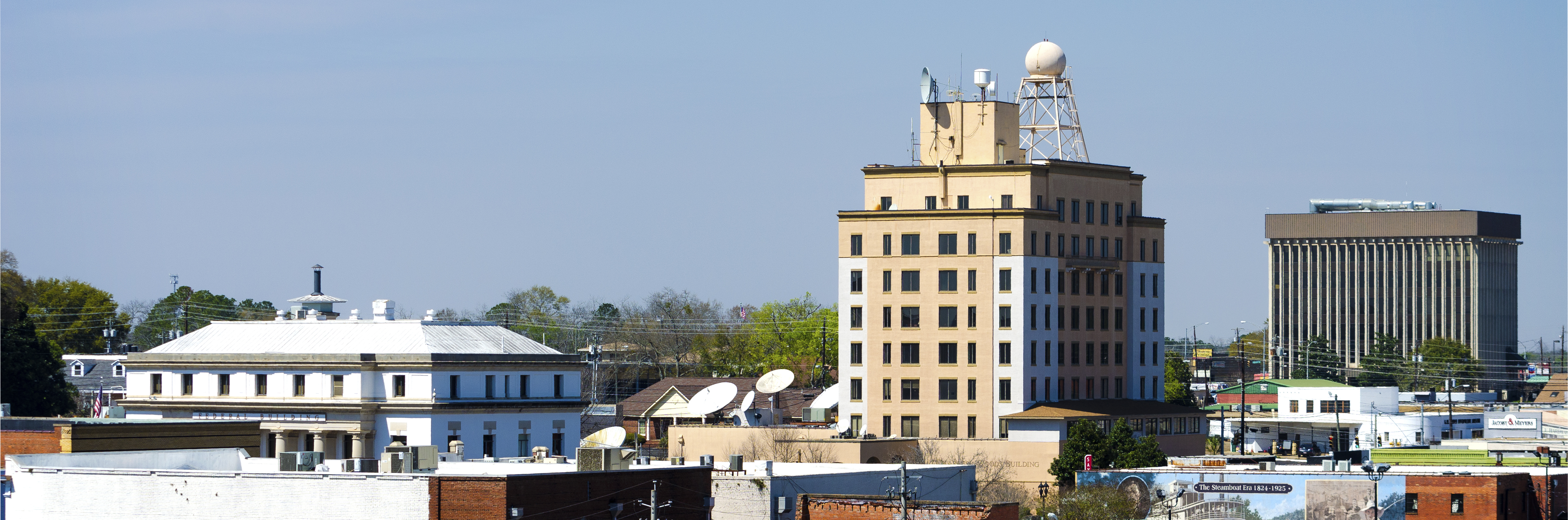
- Downtown Dothan
Interactive Map of Dothan–Enterprise–Ozark, AL CSA
City of Dothan
Dothan, AL MSA
City of Enterprise
Enterprise, AL µSA
City of Ozark
Ozark, AL µSA
City of Elba
- Country: United States
- State: Alabama
- Principal city: Dothan
- Other cities: - Enterprise; - Ozark
- Time zone: UTC-6 (CST)
  - Summer (DST): UTC-5 (CDT)

The Dothan–Enterprise–Ozark Combined Statistical Area was a CSA made up of five counties in the southeastern corner of the U.S. state of Alabama. The once statistical area includes one metropolitan area (Dothan MSA) and originally one micropolitan area (Enterprise–Ozark micropolitan area) which then was split off as two (Ozark μSA and Enterprise μSA). As of the 2010 census, the CSA had a population of 245,838. Currently an updated area called the Dothan-Ozark Combined Statistical area is used instead and Enterprise micropolitan area is now split as its own statistical area.

== Components ==
- Metropolitan Statistical Areas (MSAs)
  - Dothan (Geneva, Henry, and Houston counties) (still combined with Ozark μsa)
- Micropolitan Statistical Areas (μSAs)
  - Enterprise–Ozark micropolitan area (original μsa)
    - Enterprise (Coffee County) (current μsa, not combined anymore in a CSA)
    - Ozark (Dale County) (current μsa, still combined with Dothan MSA)

== See also ==
- Alabama census statistical areas
