= Rewind =

Rewind may refer to:

== General uses ==
- Rewinding, the process of winding magnetic tape, film, or microfilm inside a cassette or a reel backward to a previous point on the reel
  - Rewind symbol, a media control symbol indicating tape rewind or analogous operations
- Rewind (C), in the C programming language, an input/output function
- Rewind slitting or roll slitting; the process for slitting down large rolls of material into smaller rolls

== Film and television ==
- Rewind (2013 film), an American TV film by Jack Bender
- Rewind (2019 film), an American documentary film by Sasha Neulinger
- Rewind (2022 film), a Belgian comedy adventure film by Matthias Temmermans
- Rewind (2023 film), a Philippine science fiction romantic drama film by Mae Cruz-Alviar
- Rewind (2024 film), an Indian Telugu-language science fiction thriller film by Kalyan Chakravarthy
- Rewind (TV channel), a Canadian cable television network
- Rewind TV, a free-to-air American entertainment channel
- Rewind TV (British TV channel), a British television channel
- Rewind (Australian TV series), a 2004 history program
- Rewind (South Korean TV series), a 2019–2020 variety program
- Rewind with Samina Peerzada, the 2017 first series of the Pakistani streaming TV talk show With Samina Peerzada
- "Rewind" (Agents of S.H.I.E.L.D.), a television episode
- "Rewind" (Runaways), a television episode
- "Rewind" (Suits), a 2012 television episode
- "Rewind" (The Twilight Zone), a television episode
- Rewind, a character in the TV series The Transformers
- Rewind Networks, a Singaporean media company

== Music ==
- Rewind Festival, based in the UK
- Rewind (The Wire), the annual music critics' poll of the UK magazine The Wire

=== Albums ===
- Re-Wind, by Front Line Assembly, 1998
- Rewind (The Clarks album), 2015
- Rewind (E.M.D. album), 2010
- Rewind (Flame album) or the title song, 2005
- Rewind (Hexstatic album), 2000
- Rewind (Johnny Rivers album), 1967
- Rewind (Rascal Flatts album) or the title song (see below), 2014
- Rewind (1971–1984), by the Rolling Stones, 1984
- Rewind: Deja Screw, by Blaq Poet, 2006
- Rewind: The Aretha Franklin Songbook, by Christine Anu, 2012
- Rewind: The Unreleased Recordings, by JJ Cale, 2007
- Rewind – Best of 85–97, by Camouflage, 2001
- Rewind – The Best Of, by Diesel, 1996
- Rewind (EP), by Zhou Mi, or the title song, 2014
- Rewind (video), by Stereophonics, 2007
- Rewind, by Ricky Fanté, 2004
- Rewind: Singles Collection+, by Move, 2004
- Rewind – The Collection, by Craig David, 2017

=== Songs ===
- "Rewind" (Devlin song), 2013
- "Rewind" (Jamie McDell song), 2012
- "Rewind" (Paolo Nutini song), 2006
- "Rewind" (Rascal Flatts song), 2014
- "Rewind" (Stereophonics song), 2005
- "Rewind (Find a Way)", by Beverley Knight, 1998
- "Re-Rewind (The Crowd Say Bo Selecta)", by Artful Dodger, 1999
- "Rewind", by Better Than Ezra from Friction, Baby, 1996
- "Rewind", by Blxst from I'll Always Come Find You, 2024
- "Rewind", by Celetia, 1998
- "Rewind", by Charli XCX from Brat, 2024
- "Rewind", by Craig David from Born to Do It, 2000
- "Rewind", by Flo Rida from R.O.O.T.S., 2009
- "Rewind", by G-Eazy, 2018
- "Rewind", by Got7 from Flight Log: Departure, 2016
- "Rewind", by I Fight Dragons, opening theme for the TV series The Goldbergs, 2013
- "Rewind", by Jolin Tsai from Castle, 2004
- "Rewind", by Kelela from Hallucinogen, 2015
- "Rewind", by Kep1er from Doublast, 2022
- "Rewind", by Lovelyz from Sanctuary, 2018
- "Rewind", by May J., 2012
- "Rewind", by Nas from Stillmatic, 2001
- "Rewind", by NCT Dream from Glitch Mode, 2022
- "Rewind", by Pillar from Where Do We Go from Here, 2004
- "Rewind", by Precious from Precious, 2000
- "Rewind", by Twice from Formula of Love: O+T=<3, 2021
- "Rewind", by Westlife from Wild Dreams, 2021
- "Rewind", by Wonder Girls from Reboot, 2015

== Other media ==
- Rewind (novel), a 1999 novel by William Sleator
- Rewind (radio program), a 2009–2019 Canadian program on CBC Radio One
- Rewind with Gary Bryan, an American nationally syndicated radio program
- YouTube Rewind, a discontinued annual video series

== See also ==
- Rewind Cinema, Hobart, Tasmania, Australia
- RWD Magazine, a British music and lifestyle magazine
- Rollback (data management)
- Undo
