= Talladega–Sylacauga micropolitan area =

Micropolitan area in Alabama, United States

Coordinates: 33.4329°N 86.1046°W

- Micropolitan Statistical Area
- Talladega–Sylacauga, AL MSA
- Aerial view of Talladega Superspeedway in 2007, with the runways of the defunct Anniston Air Force Base visible just to the south of the active Talladega Municipal Airport
Interactive Map of Talladega–Sylacauga, AL
Micropolitan Statistical Area
City of Talladega
City of Sylacauga
Talladega–Sylacauga, AL µSA
Other Counties in the Birmingham, AL CSA
- Country: United States
- State: Alabama
- Principal cities: Talladega; Sylacauga
- Time zone: UTC−5 (CST)
  - Summer (DST): UTC−4 (CDT)

The Talladega–Sylacauga Micropolitan Statistical Area is a micropolitan statistical area that consisted of two counties in Alabama, anchored by the cities of Talladega and Sylacauga, as defined by the United States Census Bureau and the United States Office of Management and Budget. The area is also included in the Birmingham-Hoover-Talladega, Alabama Combined Statistical Area. As of the 2010 census, the μSA had a population of 93,830.

In 2013, the United States Office of Management and Budget added Coosa County to the micropolitan statistical area; it was previously part of the now-defunct Alexander City micropolitan area.

== Counties ==
- Coosa
- Talladega

== Communities ==
- Places with more than 10,000 inhabitants
  - Oxford (part)
  - Sylacauga (Principal City)
  - Talladega (Principal City)
- Places with 5,000 to 10,000 inhabitants
  - Childersburg
  - Lincoln
- Places with 1,000 to 5,000 inhabitants
  - Goodwater
  - Munford
  - Vincent (part)
- Places with less than 1,000 inhabitants
  - Bon Air
  - Kellyton
  - Oak Grove
  - Rockford
  - Talladega Springs
  - Waldo

== See also ==
- Alabama census statistical areas
