= Enterprise–Ozark micropolitan area =

- Micropolitan Statistical Area
- Enterprise–Ozark, AL Micropolitan Statistical Area
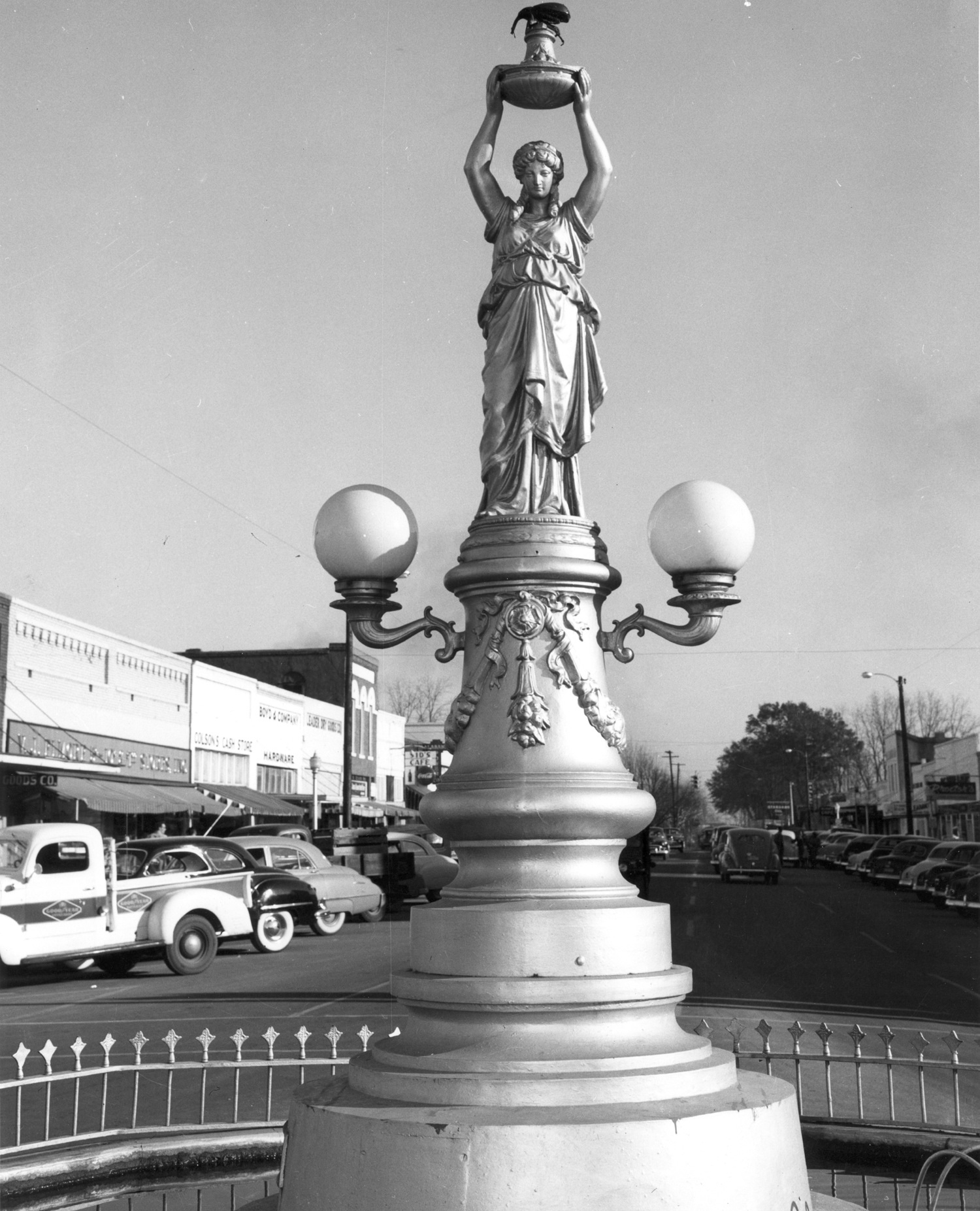
- The Boll Weevil Monument in Enterprise at its original location
Interactive Map of Dothan–Enterprise–Ozark, AL CSA
City of Dothan
Dothan, AL MSA
City of Enterprise
Enterprise, AL µSA
City of Ozark
Ozark, AL µSA
- Country: United States
- State: Alabama
- Principal cities: - Enterprise; - Ozark
- Time zone: UTC-6 (CST)
  - Summer (DST): UTC-5 (CDT)

The Enterprise–Ozark Micropolitan Statistical Area, as defined by the United States Census Bureau, was an area consisting of two counties in southeastern Alabama, anchored by the cities of Enterprise and Ozark. As of the 2000 census, the μSA had a population of 92,744 (though a July 1, 2009 estimate placed the population at 96,782).

The Enterprise–Ozark Micropolitan Statistical Area was part of the Dothan–Enterprise–Ozark Combined Statistical Area.

In 2013, the Enterprise–Ozark Micropolitan Statistical Area was split into two micropolitan areas, to let both Enterprise and Ozark have their own, independent micropolitan areas.

== Counties ==
- Coffee - reassigned as Enterprise Micropolitan Area in 2013.
- Dale - reassigned as Ozark Micropolitan Area in 2013.

== Communities ==
=== Places with more than 20,000 inhabitants ===
- Enterprise (Principal city)
- Dothan (partial)

=== Places with 10,000 to 20,000 inhabitants ===
- Ozark (Principal city)

=== Places with 1,000 to 10,000 inhabitants ===
- Daleville
- Elba
- Fort Novosel (census-designated place)
- Level Plains
- Midland City
- New Brockton
- Newton

=== Places with less than 1,000 inhabitants ===
- Ariton
- Clayhatchee
- Grimes
- Kinston
- Napier Field
- Pinckard

== Demographics ==
As of the census of 2000, there were 92,744 people, 36,299 households, and 26,119 families residing within the μSA. The racial makeup of the μSA was 75.66% White, 19.42% African American, 0.75% Native American, 1.02% Asian, 0.12% Pacific Islander, 1.10% from other races, and 1.92% from two or more races. Hispanic or Latino of any race were 3.05% of the population.

The median income for a household in the μSA was $32,831, and the median income for a family was $38,735. Males had a median income of $30,656 versus $20,111 for females. The per capita income for the μSA was $17,166.

== See also ==
- Alabama census statistical areas
