= Rewind (Australian TV series) =

Australian television show

- Country of origin: Australia
- Original language: English

Production
- Running time: 50 minutes

Original release
- Network: Australian Broadcasting Corporation
- Release: 2004

Rewind was an Australian television program that aired on the Australian Broadcasting Corporation in 2004. Rewind was part of an initiative to make programs about Australian history and used several historians as presenters. Rewind aired 14 episodes in its first season, before its cancellation.
