= Huntsville metropolitan area =

Metropolitan statistical area in Alabama, US

Huntsville Metropolitan Area
- Metropolitan Statistical Area
- Huntsville, AL Metropolitan Statistical Area
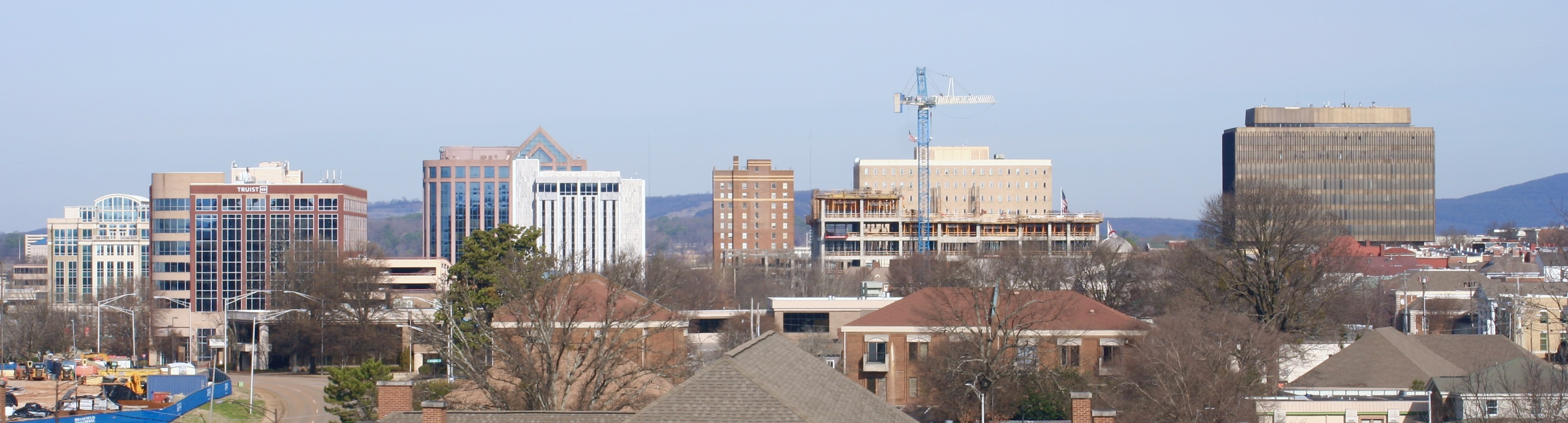
- Downtown Huntsville
Map of Huntsville–Decatur–Albertville, AL–TN CSA
Huntsville metropolitan area
Decatur metropolitan area
Albertville micropolitan area
Fort Payne micropolitan area
Fayetteville micropolitan area
City of Huntsville
City of Decatur
- Coordinates: 34.650°N 86.787°W
- Country: United States
- State(s): Alabama
- Largest city: Huntsville
- Other cities: Athens and Madison

Area
  - Total: 1,382 sq mi (3,580 km^{2})

Population (2020 Census)
  - Total: 491,723
  - Estimate (2025): 556,444
  - Rank: 108th in the U.S.

GDP
  - Total: $38.101 billion (2022)
- Time zone: UTC-6 (CST)
  - Summer (DST): UTC-5 (CDT)

The Huntsville, AL Metropolitan Statistical Area is a metropolitan statistical area (MSA) on the northern border of Alabama. The metro area consists of two counties - Limestone and Madison - anchored by the principal city of Huntsville. As of the 2020 United States census, the Huntsville Metropolitan Area's population was 491,723, making it the 2nd-largest metropolitan area in Alabama (behind only the Birmingham metropolitan area) and the 113th-largest in the United States. The MSA is a component of the broader Huntsville–Decatur–Albertville, AL–TN Combined Statistical Area.

== Counties ==
County	Seat	2025 estimate	2020 Census	Change	Area	Density
Madison	Huntsville	433,516	388,153	+11.69%	813 sq mi (2,110 km^{2})	533/sq mi (206/km^{2})
Limestone	Athens	122,928	103,570	+18.69%	607 sq mi (1,570 km^{2})	203/sq mi (78/km^{2})
Total		556,444	491,723	+13.16%	1,420 sq mi (3,700 km^{2})	392/sq mi (151/km^{2})

== Places ==
- Ardmore (1,321), sister city of Ardmore Tennessee
- Athens (26)
- Brownsboro
- East Limestone
- Elkmont (411)
- Gurley (816)
- Harvest (5,893)
- Hazel Green (4,105)
- Lester (111)
- Madison (56,933), Largest suburb
- Meridianville (8,209)
- Monrovia
- Moores Mill (6,729)
- Mooresville (47), smallest suburb
- New Hope (2,889)
- New Market (1,543)
- Owens Cross Roads (2,594)
- Redstone Arsenal (837), U.S. Army post
- Toney
- Triana (2,890)

Decatur also has land within Limestone County, however the portion within Limestone County is uninhabited and Decatur forms its own separate Metropolitan Area.

Historical population
Census	Pop.	Note	%±
1820	27,332		—
1830	42,397		55.1%
1840	40,180		−5.2%
1850	42,720		6.3%
1860	41,857		−2.0%
1870	46,284		10.6%
1880	59,125		27.7%
1890	59,350		0.4%
1900	66,079		11.3%
1910	73,961		11.9%
1920	82,609		11.7%
1930	101,232		22.5%
1940	101,959		0.7%
1950	108,669		6.6%
1960	153,861		41.6%
1970	228,239		48.3%
1980	242,971		6.5%
1990	293,047		20.6%
2000	342,376		16.8%
2010	417,593		22.0%
2020	491,723		17.8%
2025 (est.)	556,444		13.2%

== Transportation ==
- Interstate 65
- Interstate 565
- U.S. Highway 72
- U.S. Highway 231
- U.S. Highway 431
- U.S. Highway 31

== See also ==
- Table of United States Metropolitan Statistical Areas
- Table of United States Combined Statistical Areas
- Alabama census statistical areas
