= Alabama Broadcasters Association =

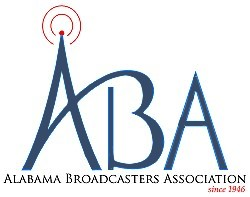

The Alabama Broadcasters Association (ABA) represents radio and television broadcasters across the U.S. state of Alabama. It is affiliated with the National Association of Broadcasters. Every year the organization presents the ABBY (Alabama's Best in Broadcasting Yearly) Awards. The organization also has a hall of fame.

== See also ==
- List of radio stations in Alabama
- List of television stations in Alabama
