= Alabama statistical areas =

Coordinates: 32.7794°N 86.8287°W

The U.S. State of Alabama currently has 35 statistical areas that have been delineated by the Office of Management and Budget (OMB).

On July 21, 2023, the OMB delineated nine combined statistical areas, 13 metropolitan statistical areas, and 13 micropolitan statistical areas in Alabama. As of 2023, the largest of these is the Birmingham-Cullman-Talladega, AL CSA, encompassing the area around the state's third-largest city, Birmingham.

== Statistical areas ==
The Office of Management and Budget (OMB) has designated more than 1,000 statistical areas for the United States and Puerto Rico. These statistical areas are important geographic delineations of population clusters used by the OMB, the United States Census Bureau, planning organizations, and federal, state, and local government entities.

The OMB defines a core-based statistical area (commonly referred to as a CBSA) as the county or counties (or county-equivalents) surrounding at least one densely-settled core of at least 10,000 population, "plus adjacent counties having a high degree of social and economic integration with the core as measured through commuting ties with the counties containing the core". The OMB further divides core-based statistical areas based on population into metropolitan statistical areas (MSAs) for those with at least 50,000 and micropolitan statistical areas (μSAs) for those with 10,000 to 49,999 people.

The OMB defines a combined statistical area (CSA) as two or more adjacent core-based statistical areas where the employment interchange rate (% commuting from A to B plus % commuting from B to A) is at least 15%. The primary statistical areas (PSAs) include all combined statistical areas and any core-based statistical area that is not a constituent of a combined statistical area.

The 35 United States statistical areas and 67 counties of the State of Alabama (Note: An out-of-state area and its population are displayed in green. An area that extends into more than one state is displayed in purple. A purple population number over a black population number show the total population versus the in-state population. The state's abbreviation is also shown next to the in-state total.)
Combined statistical area	2025 population (est.)	Core-based statistical area	2025 population (est.)	County	2025 population (est.)	Metropolitan division	2025 population (est.)
Birmingham-Cullman-Talladega, AL CSA	1,383,539	Birmingham, AL MSA	1,197,766	Jefferson County, Alabama	665,742	none	
Birmingham-Cullman-Talladega, AL CSA	1,383,539	Birmingham, AL MSA	1,197,766	Shelby County, Alabama	238,552	none	
Birmingham-Cullman-Talladega, AL CSA	1,383,539	Birmingham, AL MSA	1,197,766	St. Clair County, Alabama	98,206	none	
Birmingham-Cullman-Talladega, AL CSA	1,383,539	Birmingham, AL MSA	1,197,766	Walker County, Alabama	65,140	none	
Birmingham-Cullman-Talladega, AL CSA	1,383,539	Birmingham, AL MSA	1,197,766	Blount County, Alabama	60,156	none	
Birmingham-Cullman-Talladega, AL CSA	1,383,539	Birmingham, AL MSA	1,197,766	Chilton County, Alabama	47,708	none	
Birmingham-Cullman-Talladega, AL CSA	1,383,539	Birmingham, AL MSA	1,197,766	Bibb County, Alabama	22,262	none	
Birmingham-Cullman-Talladega, AL CSA	1,383,539	Cullman, AL μSA	94,009	Cullman County, Alabama	94,009	none	
Birmingham-Cullman-Talladega, AL CSA	1,383,539	Talladega-Sylacauga, AL μSA	91,764	Talladega County, Alabama	91,764	none	
Birmingham-Cullman-Talladega, AL CSA	1,383,539	Talladega-Sylacauga, AL μSA	91,764	Coosa County, Alabama	10,268	none	
Huntsville-Decatur-Albertville, AL-TN CSA	931,245; 894,392 (AL)	Huntsville, AL MSA	556,444	Madison County, Alabama	433,516	none	
Huntsville-Decatur-Albertville, AL-TN CSA	931,245; 894,392 (AL)	Huntsville, AL MSA	556,444	Limestone County, Alabama	122,928	none	
Huntsville-Decatur-Albertville, AL-TN CSA	931,245; 894,392 (AL)	Decatur, AL MSA	160,326	Morgan County, Alabama	126,483	none	
Huntsville-Decatur-Albertville, AL-TN CSA	931,245; 894,392 (AL)	Decatur, AL MSA	160,326	Lawrence County, Alabama	33,843	none	
Huntsville-Decatur-Albertville, AL-TN CSA	931,245; 894,392 (AL)	Albertville, AL μSA	103,537	Marshall County, Alabama	103,537	none	
Huntsville-Decatur-Albertville, AL-TN CSA	931,245; 894,392 (AL)	Fort Payne, AL μSA	74,085	DeKalb County, Alabama	74,085	none	
Huntsville-Decatur-Albertville, AL-TN CSA	931,245; 894,392 (AL)	Fayetteville, TN μSA	36,853	Lincoln County, Tennessee	36,853	none	
Mobile-Daphne-Fairhope, AL CSA	679,419	Mobile, AL MSA	411,658	Mobile County, Alabama	411,658	none	
Mobile-Daphne-Fairhope, AL CSA	679,419	Daphne-Fairhope-Foley, AL MSA	267,761	Baldwin County, Alabama	267,761	none	
Montgomery-Selma, AL CSA	423,887	Montgomery, AL MSA	388,747	Montgomery County, Alabama	225,891	none	
Montgomery-Selma, AL CSA	423,887	Montgomery, AL MSA	388,747	Elmore County, Alabama	91,577	none	
Montgomery-Selma, AL CSA	423,887	Montgomery, AL MSA	388,747	Autauga County, Alabama	61,920	none	
Montgomery-Selma, AL CSA	423,887	Montgomery, AL MSA	388,747	Lowndes County, Alabama	9,359	none	
Montgomery-Selma, AL CSA	423,887	Selma, AL μSA	35,140	Dallas County, Alabama	35,140	none	
Columbus-Auburn-Opelika, GA-AL CSA	573,796; 307,864 (AL)	Columbus, GA-AL MSA	324,830; 58,898 (AL)	Muscogee County, Georgia	202,171	none	
Columbus-Auburn-Opelika, GA-AL CSA	573,796; 307,864 (AL)	Columbus, GA-AL MSA	324,830; 58,898 (AL)	Russell County, Alabama	58,898	none	
Columbus-Auburn-Opelika, GA-AL CSA	573,796; 307,864 (AL)	Columbus, GA-AL MSA	324,830; 58,898 (AL)	Harris County, Georgia	37,280	none	
Columbus-Auburn-Opelika, GA-AL CSA	573,796; 307,864 (AL)	Columbus, GA-AL MSA	324,830; 58,898 (AL)	Chattahoochee County, Georgia	8,465	none	
Columbus-Auburn-Opelika, GA-AL CSA	573,796; 307,864 (AL)	Columbus, GA-AL MSA	324,830; 58,898 (AL)	Marion County, Georgia	7,676	none	
Columbus-Auburn-Opelika, GA-AL CSA	573,796; 307,864 (AL)	Columbus, GA-AL MSA	324,830; 58,898 (AL)	Talbot County, Georgia	5,709	none	
Columbus-Auburn-Opelika, GA-AL CSA	573,796; 307,864 (AL)	Columbus, GA-AL MSA	324,830; 58,898 (AL)	Stewart County, Georgia	4,631	none	
Columbus-Auburn-Opelika, GA-AL CSA	573,796; 307,864 (AL)	Auburn-Opelika, AL MSA	208,013	Lee County, Alabama	189,881	none	
Columbus-Auburn-Opelika, GA-AL CSA	573,796; 307,864 (AL)	Auburn-Opelika, AL MSA	208,013	Macon County, Alabama	18,132	none	
Columbus-Auburn-Opelika, GA-AL CSA	573,796; 307,864 (AL)	Alexander City, AL μSA	40,953	Tallapoosa County, Alabama	40,953	none	
none		Tuscaloosa, AL MSA	281,850	Tuscaloosa County, Alabama	241,368	none	
none		Tuscaloosa, AL MSA	281,850	Pickens County, Alabama	18,221	none	
none		Tuscaloosa, AL MSA	281,850	Hale County, Alabama	15,194	none	
none		Tuscaloosa, AL MSA	281,850	Greene County, Alabama	7,067	none	
Dothan-Enterprise-Ozark, AL CSA	263,131	Dothan, AL MSA	156,266	Houston County, Alabama	110,318	none	
Dothan-Enterprise-Ozark, AL CSA	263,131	Dothan, AL MSA	156,266	Geneva County, Alabama	27,554	none	
Dothan-Enterprise-Ozark, AL CSA	263,131	Dothan, AL MSA	156,266	Henry County, Alabama	18,394	none	
Dothan-Enterprise-Ozark, AL CSA	263,131	Enterprise, AL μSA	56,953	Coffee County, Alabama	56,953	none	
Dothan-Enterprise-Ozark, AL CSA	263,131	Ozark, AL μSA	49,912	Dale County, Alabama	49,912	none	
Florence-Muscle Shoals-Russellville, AL CSA	189,058	Florence-Muscle Shoals, AL MSA	156,609	Lauderdale County, Alabama	97,135	none	
Florence-Muscle Shoals-Russellville, AL CSA	189,058	Florence-Muscle Shoals, AL MSA	156,609	Colbert County, Alabama	59,474	none	
Florence-Muscle Shoals-Russellville, AL CSA	189,058	Russellville, AL μSA	32,449	Franklin County, Alabama	32,449	none	
none		Anniston-Oxford, AL MSA	115,834	Calhoun County, Alabama	115,834	none	
none		Gadsden, AL MSA	103,886	Etowah County, Alabama	103,886	none	
Chattanooga-Cleveland-Dalton, TN-GA-AL CSA	1,027,577; 54,281 (AL)	Chattanooga, TN-GA MSA	594,530	Hamilton County, Tennessee	390,833	none	
Chattanooga-Cleveland-Dalton, TN-GA-AL CSA	1,027,577; 54,281 (AL)	Chattanooga, TN-GA MSA	594,530	Walker County, Georgia	70,250	none	
Chattanooga-Cleveland-Dalton, TN-GA-AL CSA	1,027,577; 54,281 (AL)	Chattanooga, TN-GA MSA	594,530	Catoosa County, Georgia	69,628	none	
Chattanooga-Cleveland-Dalton, TN-GA-AL CSA	1,027,577; 54,281 (AL)	Chattanooga, TN-GA MSA	594,530	Marion County, Tennessee	29,804	none	
Chattanooga-Cleveland-Dalton, TN-GA-AL CSA	1,027,577; 54,281 (AL)	Chattanooga, TN-GA MSA	594,530	Sequatchie County, Tennessee	17,861	none	
Chattanooga-Cleveland-Dalton, TN-GA-AL CSA	1,027,577; 54,281 (AL)	Chattanooga, TN-GA MSA	594,530	Dade County, Georgia	16,154	none	
Chattanooga-Cleveland-Dalton, TN-GA-AL CSA	1,027,577; 54,281 (AL)	Dalton, GA MSA	147,819	Whitfield County, Georgia	106,212	none	
Chattanooga-Cleveland-Dalton, TN-GA-AL CSA	1,027,577; 54,281 (AL)	Dalton, GA MSA	147,819	Murray County, Georgia	41,607	none	
Chattanooga-Cleveland-Dalton, TN-GA-AL CSA	1,027,577; 54,281 (AL)	Cleveland, TN MSA	134,057	Bradley County, Tennessee	115,465	none	
Chattanooga-Cleveland-Dalton, TN-GA-AL CSA	1,027,577; 54,281 (AL)	Cleveland, TN MSA	134,057	Polk County, Tennessee	18,592	none	
Chattanooga-Cleveland-Dalton, TN-GA-AL CSA	1,027,577; 54,281 (AL)	Athens, TN μSA	71,590	McMinn County, Tennessee	57,404	none	
Chattanooga-Cleveland-Dalton, TN-GA-AL CSA	1,027,577; 54,281 (AL)	Athens, TN μSA	71,590	Meigs County, Tennessee	14,186	none	
Chattanooga-Cleveland-Dalton, TN-GA-AL CSA	1,027,577; 54,281 (AL)	Scottsboro, AL μSA	54,281	Jackson County, Alabama	54,281	none	
Chattanooga-Cleveland-Dalton, TN-GA-AL CSA	1,027,577; 54,281 (AL)	Summerville, GA μSA	25,300	Chattooga County, Georgia	25,300	none	
Atlanta--Athens-Clarke County--Sandy Springs, GA-AL CSA	7,426,769; 34,253 (AL)	Atlanta-Sandy Springs-Roswell, GA MSA	6,482,182	Fulton County, Georgia	1,098,791	Atlanta-Sandy Springs-Roswell, GA MD	4,913,673
Atlanta--Athens-Clarke County--Sandy Springs, GA-AL CSA	7,426,769; 34,253 (AL)	Atlanta-Sandy Springs-Roswell, GA MSA	6,482,182	Gwinnett County, Georgia	1,018,099	Atlanta-Sandy Springs-Roswell, GA MD	4,913,673
Atlanta--Athens-Clarke County--Sandy Springs, GA-AL CSA	7,426,769; 34,253 (AL)	Atlanta-Sandy Springs-Roswell, GA MSA	6,482,182	DeKalb County, Georgia	774,394	Atlanta-Sandy Springs-Roswell, GA MD	4,913,673
Atlanta--Athens-Clarke County--Sandy Springs, GA-AL CSA	7,426,769; 34,253 (AL)	Atlanta-Sandy Springs-Roswell, GA MSA	6,482,182	Clayton County, Georgia	297,471	Atlanta-Sandy Springs-Roswell, GA MD	4,913,673
Atlanta--Athens-Clarke County--Sandy Springs, GA-AL CSA	7,426,769; 34,253 (AL)	Atlanta-Sandy Springs-Roswell, GA MSA	6,482,182	Forsyth County, Georgia	282,805	Atlanta-Sandy Springs-Roswell, GA MD	4,913,673
Atlanta--Athens-Clarke County--Sandy Springs, GA-AL CSA	7,426,769; 34,253 (AL)	Atlanta-Sandy Springs-Roswell, GA MSA	6,482,182	Henry County, Georgia	264,922	Atlanta-Sandy Springs-Roswell, GA MD	4,913,673
Atlanta--Athens-Clarke County--Sandy Springs, GA-AL CSA	7,426,769; 34,253 (AL)	Atlanta-Sandy Springs-Roswell, GA MSA	6,482,182	Coweta County, Georgia	160,240	Atlanta-Sandy Springs-Roswell, GA MD	4,913,673
Atlanta--Athens-Clarke County--Sandy Springs, GA-AL CSA	7,426,769; 34,253 (AL)	Atlanta-Sandy Springs-Roswell, GA MSA	6,482,182	Douglas County, Georgia	154,293	Atlanta-Sandy Springs-Roswell, GA MD	4,913,673
Atlanta--Athens-Clarke County--Sandy Springs, GA-AL CSA	7,426,769; 34,253 (AL)	Atlanta-Sandy Springs-Roswell, GA MSA	6,482,182	Carroll County, Georgia	131,036	Atlanta-Sandy Springs-Roswell, GA MD	4,913,673
Atlanta--Athens-Clarke County--Sandy Springs, GA-AL CSA	7,426,769; 34,253 (AL)	Atlanta-Sandy Springs-Roswell, GA MSA	6,482,182	Fayette County, Georgia	125,156	Atlanta-Sandy Springs-Roswell, GA MD	4,913,673
Atlanta--Athens-Clarke County--Sandy Springs, GA-AL CSA	7,426,769; 34,253 (AL)	Atlanta-Sandy Springs-Roswell, GA MSA	6,482,182	Newton County, Georgia	125,583	Atlanta-Sandy Springs-Roswell, GA MD	4,913,673
Atlanta--Athens-Clarke County--Sandy Springs, GA-AL CSA	7,426,769; 34,253 (AL)	Atlanta-Sandy Springs-Roswell, GA MSA	6,482,182	Walton County, Georgia	112,696	Atlanta-Sandy Springs-Roswell, GA MD	4,913,673
Atlanta--Athens-Clarke County--Sandy Springs, GA-AL CSA	7,426,769; 34,253 (AL)	Atlanta-Sandy Springs-Roswell, GA MSA	6,482,182	Rockdale County, Georgia	98,416	Atlanta-Sandy Springs-Roswell, GA MD	4,913,673
Atlanta--Athens-Clarke County--Sandy Springs, GA-AL CSA	7,426,769; 34,253 (AL)	Atlanta-Sandy Springs-Roswell, GA MSA	6,482,182	Barrow County, Georgia	99,773	Atlanta-Sandy Springs-Roswell, GA MD	4,913,673
Atlanta--Athens-Clarke County--Sandy Springs, GA-AL CSA	7,426,769; 34,253 (AL)	Atlanta-Sandy Springs-Roswell, GA MSA	6,482,182	Spalding County, Georgia	70,775	Atlanta-Sandy Springs-Roswell, GA MD	4,913,673
Atlanta--Athens-Clarke County--Sandy Springs, GA-AL CSA	7,426,769; 34,253 (AL)	Atlanta-Sandy Springs-Roswell, GA MSA	6,482,182	Pickens County, Georgia	37,167	Atlanta-Sandy Springs-Roswell, GA MD	4,913,673
Atlanta--Athens-Clarke County--Sandy Springs, GA-AL CSA	7,426,769; 34,253 (AL)	Atlanta-Sandy Springs-Roswell, GA MSA	6,482,182	Lumpkin County, Georgia	36,178	Atlanta-Sandy Springs-Roswell, GA MD	4,913,673
Atlanta--Athens-Clarke County--Sandy Springs, GA-AL CSA	7,426,769; 34,253 (AL)	Atlanta-Sandy Springs-Roswell, GA MSA	6,482,182	Dawson County, Georgia	35,365	Atlanta-Sandy Springs-Roswell, GA MD	4,913,673
Atlanta--Athens-Clarke County--Sandy Springs, GA-AL CSA	7,426,769; 34,253 (AL)	Atlanta-Sandy Springs-Roswell, GA MSA	6,482,182	Butts County, Georgia	27,218	Atlanta-Sandy Springs-Roswell, GA MD	4,913,673
Atlanta--Athens-Clarke County--Sandy Springs, GA-AL CSA	7,426,769; 34,253 (AL)	Atlanta-Sandy Springs-Roswell, GA MSA	6,482,182	Morgan County, Georgia	22,095	Atlanta-Sandy Springs-Roswell, GA MD	4,913,673
Atlanta--Athens-Clarke County--Sandy Springs, GA-AL CSA	7,426,769; 34,253 (AL)	Atlanta-Sandy Springs-Roswell, GA MSA	6,482,182	Meriwether County, Georgia	21,516	Atlanta-Sandy Springs-Roswell, GA MD	4,913,673
Atlanta--Athens-Clarke County--Sandy Springs, GA-AL CSA	7,426,769; 34,253 (AL)	Atlanta-Sandy Springs-Roswell, GA MSA	6,482,182	Pike County, Georgia	20,932	Atlanta-Sandy Springs-Roswell, GA MD	4,913,673
Atlanta--Athens-Clarke County--Sandy Springs, GA-AL CSA	7,426,769; 34,253 (AL)	Atlanta-Sandy Springs-Roswell, GA MSA	6,482,182	Lamar County, Georgia	[REMOVED FROM MSA]	Atlanta-Sandy Springs-Roswell, GA MD	4,913,673
Atlanta--Athens-Clarke County--Sandy Springs, GA-AL CSA	7,426,769; 34,253 (AL)	Atlanta-Sandy Springs-Roswell, GA MSA	6,482,182	Jasper County, Georgia	17,632	Atlanta-Sandy Springs-Roswell, GA MD	4,913,673
Atlanta--Athens-Clarke County--Sandy Springs, GA-AL CSA	7,426,769; 34,253 (AL)	Atlanta-Sandy Springs-Roswell, GA MSA	6,482,182	Heard County, Georgia	12,149	Atlanta-Sandy Springs-Roswell, GA MD	4,913,673
Atlanta--Athens-Clarke County--Sandy Springs, GA-AL CSA	7,426,769; 34,253 (AL)	Atlanta-Sandy Springs-Roswell, GA MSA	6,482,182	Cobb County, Georgia	793,345	Marietta, GA MD	1,393,588
Atlanta--Athens-Clarke County--Sandy Springs, GA-AL CSA	7,426,769; 34,253 (AL)	Atlanta-Sandy Springs-Roswell, GA MSA	6,482,182	Cherokee County, Georgia	299,273	Marietta, GA MD	1,393,588
Atlanta--Athens-Clarke County--Sandy Springs, GA-AL CSA	7,426,769; 34,253 (AL)	Atlanta-Sandy Springs-Roswell, GA MSA	6,482,182	Paulding County, Georgia	190,996	Marietta, GA MD	1,393,588
Atlanta--Athens-Clarke County--Sandy Springs, GA-AL CSA	7,426,769; 34,253 (AL)	Atlanta-Sandy Springs-Roswell, GA MSA	6,482,182	Bartow County, Georgia	120,800	Marietta, GA MD	1,393,588
Atlanta--Athens-Clarke County--Sandy Springs, GA-AL CSA	7,426,769; 34,253 (AL)	Atlanta-Sandy Springs-Roswell, GA MSA	6,482,182	Haralson County, Georgia	33,066	Marietta, GA MD	1,393,588
Atlanta--Athens-Clarke County--Sandy Springs, GA-AL CSA	7,426,769; 34,253 (AL)	Athens-Clarke County, GA MSA	224,148	Clarke County, Georgia	129,921	none	
Atlanta--Athens-Clarke County--Sandy Springs, GA-AL CSA	7,426,769; 34,253 (AL)	Athens-Clarke County, GA MSA	224,148	Oconee County, Georgia	44,893	none	
Atlanta--Athens-Clarke County--Sandy Springs, GA-AL CSA	7,426,769; 34,253 (AL)	Athens-Clarke County, GA MSA	224,148	Madison County, Georgia	32,919	none	
Atlanta--Athens-Clarke County--Sandy Springs, GA-AL CSA	7,426,769; 34,253 (AL)	Athens-Clarke County, GA MSA	224,148	Oglethorpe County, Georgia	16,415	none	
Atlanta--Athens-Clarke County--Sandy Springs, GA-AL CSA	7,426,769; 34,253 (AL)	Gainesville, GA MSA	226,568	Hall County, Georgia	226,568	none	
Atlanta--Athens-Clarke County--Sandy Springs, GA-AL CSA	7,426,769; 34,253 (AL)	LaGrange, GA-AL μSA	107,097; 34,253 (AL)	Troup County, Georgia	72,844	none	
Atlanta--Athens-Clarke County--Sandy Springs, GA-AL CSA	7,426,769; 34,253 (AL)	LaGrange, GA-AL μSA	107,097; 34,253 (AL)	Chambers County, Alabama	34,253	none	
Atlanta--Athens-Clarke County--Sandy Springs, GA-AL CSA	7,426,769; 34,253 (AL)	Rome, GA MSA	101,378	Floyd County, Georgia	101,378	none	
Atlanta--Athens-Clarke County--Sandy Springs, GA-AL CSA	7,426,769; 34,253 (AL)	Jefferson, GA μSA	99,265	Jackson County, Georgia	99,265	none	
Atlanta--Athens-Clarke County--Sandy Springs, GA-AL CSA	7,426,769; 34,253 (AL)	Calhoun, GA μSA	61,701	Gordon County, Georgia	61,701	none	
Atlanta--Athens-Clarke County--Sandy Springs, GA-AL CSA	7,426,769; 34,253 (AL)	Cornelia, GA μSA	50,416	Habersham County, Georgia	50,416	none	
Atlanta--Athens-Clarke County--Sandy Springs, GA-AL CSA	7,426,769; 34,253 (AL)	Cedartown, GA μSA	45,514	Polk County, Georgia	45,514	none	
Atlanta--Athens-Clarke County--Sandy Springs, GA-AL CSA	7,426,769; 34,253 (AL)	Thomaston, GA μSA	28,500	Upson County, Georgia	28,500	none	
none		Troy, AL μSA	33,688	Pike County, Alabama	33,688	none	
none		Eufaula, AL-GA μSA	26,861; 24,607 (AL)	Barbour County, Alabama	24,607	none	
none		Eufaula, AL-GA μSA	26,861; 24,607 (AL)	Quitman County, Georgia	2,254	none	
none		none		Covington County, Alabama	37,947	none	
none		none		Escambia County, Alabama	36,665	none	
none		none		Marion County, Alabama	29,097	none	
none		none		Cherokee County, Alabama	26,413	none	
none		none		Winston County, Alabama	23,829	none	
none		none		Randolph County, Alabama	23,163	none	
none		none		Clarke County, Alabama	22,014	none	
none		none		Monroe County, Alabama	18,965	none	
none		none		Marengo County, Alabama	18,311	none	
none		none		Butler County, Alabama	18,100	none	
none		none		Fayette County, Alabama	15,872	none	
none		none		Cleburne County, Alabama	15,970	none	
none		none		Washington County, Alabama	14,822	none	
none		none		Clay County, Alabama	14,207	none	
none		none		Lamar County, Alabama	13,587	none	
none		none		Crenshaw County, Alabama	13,175	none	
none		none		Choctaw County, Alabama	11,904	none	
none		none		Sumter County, Alabama	11,588	none	
none		none		Conecuh County, Alabama	10,899	none	
none		none		Wilcox County, Alabama	9,666	none	
none		none		Bullock County, Alabama	9,780	none	
none		none		Perry County, Alabama	7,425	none	
State of Alabama					5,193,088	none	

The 26 core-based statistical areas of the State of Alabama (Note: For CBSAs comprising populations from multiple states, they are listed twice to show both their intrastate population within that CBSA as well as the CBSA's total population. Only the intrastate population is ranked.)
2025 rank	Core-based statistical area	Population				
2025 rank	Core-based statistical area	2025 estimate	Change	2020 Census	Change	2010 Census
1	Birmingham, AL MSA	1,197,766	+1.45%	1,180,631	+4.66%	1,128,047
2	Huntsville, AL MSA	556,444	+13.16%	491,723	+17.75%	417,593
3	Mobile, AL MSA	411,658	−0.76%	414,809	+0.44%	412,992
4	Montgomery, AL MSA	388,747	+0.70%	386,047	+3.07%	374,536
5	Tuscaloosa, AL MSA	281,850	+4.90%	268,674	+12.32%	239,207
6	Daphne-Fairhope-Foley, AL MSA	267,761	+15.53%	231,767	+27.16%	182,265
7	Auburn-Opelika, AL MSA	208,013	+7.35%	193,773	+19.84%	161,699
8	Decatur, AL MSA	160,326	+2.45%	156,494	+1.73%	153,829
9	Florence-Muscle Shoals, AL MSA	156,609	+3.86%	150,791	+2.48%	147,137
10	Dothan, AL MSA	156,266	+3.48%	151,007	+3.69%	145,639
11	Anniston-Oxford, AL MSA	115,834	−0.52%	116,441	−1.80%	118,572
12	Gadsden, AL MSA	103,886	+0.44%	103,436	−0.95%	104,430
13	Albertville, AL μSA	103,537	+6.07%	97,612	+4.94%	93,019
14	Cullman, AL μSA	94,009	+6.99%	87,866	+9.28%	80,406
15	Talladega-Sylacauga, AL μSA	91,764	−0.83%	92,536	−1.38%	93,830
16	Fort Payne, AL μSA	74,085	+3.46%	71,608	+0.70%	71,109
17	Columbus, GA-AL MSA (AL)	58,898	−0.48%	59,183	+11.78%	52,947
18	Enterprise, AL μSA	56,953	+6.52%	53,465	+7.04%	49,948
19	Scottsboro, AL μSA	54,281	+3.24%	52,579	−1.22%	53,227
20	Ozark, AL μSA	49,912	+1.19%	49,326	−1.84%	50,251
21	Alexander City, AL μSA	40,953	−0.87%	41,311	−0.73%	41,616
22	Selma, AL μSA	35,140	−8.64%	38,462	−12.23%	43,820
23	LaGrange, GA-AL μSA (AL)	34,253	−1.49%	34,772	+1.63%	34,215
24	Troy, AL μSA	33,688	+2.06%	33,009	+0.33%	32,899
25	Russellville, AL μSA	32,449	+1.05%	32,113	+1.29%	31,704
26	Eufaula, AL-GA μSA (AL)	24,607	−2.44%	25,223	−8.14%	27,457
	Columbus, GA-AL MSA	324,830	−1.23%	328,883	+6.85%	307,788
	Eufaula, AL-GA μSA	26,861	−2.17%	27,458	−8.38%	29,970
	LaGrange, GA-AL μSA	107,097	+2.78%	104,198	+2.90%	101,259

The nine combined statistical areas of the State of Alabama (Note: For CSAs comprising populations from multiple states, they are listed twice to show both their intrastate population within that CSA as well as the CSA's total population. Only the intrastate population is ranked.)
2025 rank	Combined statistical area	Population				
2025 rank	Combined statistical area	2025 estimate	Change	2020 Census	Change	2010 Census
1	Birmingham-Cullman-Talladega, AL CSA	1,383,539	+1.65%	1,361,033	+4.51%	1,302,283
2	Huntsville-Decatur-Albertville, AL-TN CSA (AL)	894,392	+9.41%	817,437	+11.13%	735,550
3	Mobile-Daphne-Fairhope, AL CSA	679,419	+5.08%	646,576	+8.62%	595,257
4	Montgomery-Selma, AL CSA	423,887	−0.15%	424,509	+1.47%	418,356
5	Columbus-Auburn-Opelika, GA-AL CSA (AL)	307,864	+4.62%	294,267	+14.83%	256,262
6	Dothan-Enterprise-Ozark, AL CSA	263,131	+3.68%	253,798	+3.24%	245,838
7	Florence-Muscle Shoals-Russellville, AL CSA	189,058	+3.36%	182,904	+2.27%	178,841
8	Chattanooga-Cleveland-Dalton, TN-GA-AL CSA (AL)	54,281	+3.24%	52,579	−1.22%	53,227
9	Atlanta--Athens-Clarke County--Sandy Springs, GA-AL CSA (AL)	34,253	−1.49%	34,772	+1.63%	34,215
	Atlanta--Athens-Clarke County--Sandy Springs, GA-AL CSA	7,426,769	+6.18%	6,994,671	+14.41%	6,113,835
	Chattanooga-Cleveland-Dalton, TN-GA-AL CSA	1,027,577	+5.37%	975,226	+4.93%	929,449
	Columbus-Auburn-Opelika, GA-AL CSA	573,796	+1.74%	563,967	+10.34%	511,103
	Huntsville-Decatur-Albertivlle, AL-TN CSA	931,245	+9.20%	852,756	+10.90%	768,911

== Urban areas ==
Due to suburbanization, the typical urban area is polycentric rather than being centered around a large historic core city. Huntsville is unique in that it is split into two separate urban areas, one for most of the city and Madison, and the smaller one including the Big Cove valley area and part of northern Owens Crossroads.

Urban area	2020 population (est.)	Settlements	County	Combined statistical area	Core-base statistical area	Metropolitan division
Albertville, Alabama	38,476	Albertville	Marshall	Huntsville–Decatur–Albertville, AL	Albertville, AL μSA	N/A
Alexander City, Alabama	8,920	Alexander City	Tallapoosa	Columbus–Auburn–Opelika, GA-AL	Alexander City, AL μSA	N/A
Andalusia, Alabama	6,391	Andalusia	Covington	N/A (Note: This settlement is entirely or partially not part of any core-based statistical area.)		
Anniston–Oxford, Alabama	78,302	Anniston; Oxford				N/A
Arab, Alabama	7,849	Arab	Marshall	Huntsville–Decatur–Albertville, AL	Albertville, AL μSA	N/A
Athens, Alabama	23,204	Athens	Limestone	Huntsville–Decatur–Albertville, AL	Huntsville, AL MSA	N/A

== See also ==
- Geography of Alabama
  - Demographics of Alabama
