= Birmingham metropolitan area, Alabama =

Coordinates: 33.524755°N 86.81274°W

Greater Birmingham
- Metropolitan Statistical Area
- Birmingham, AL Metropolitan Statistical Area
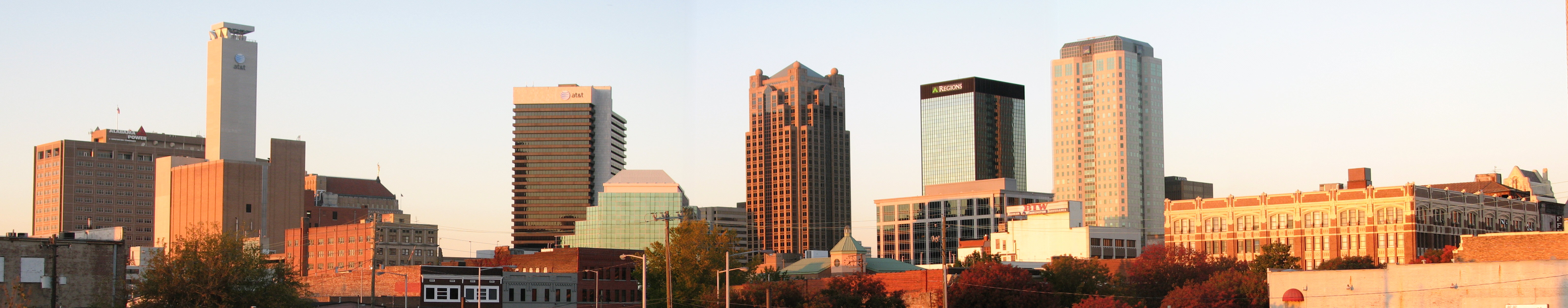
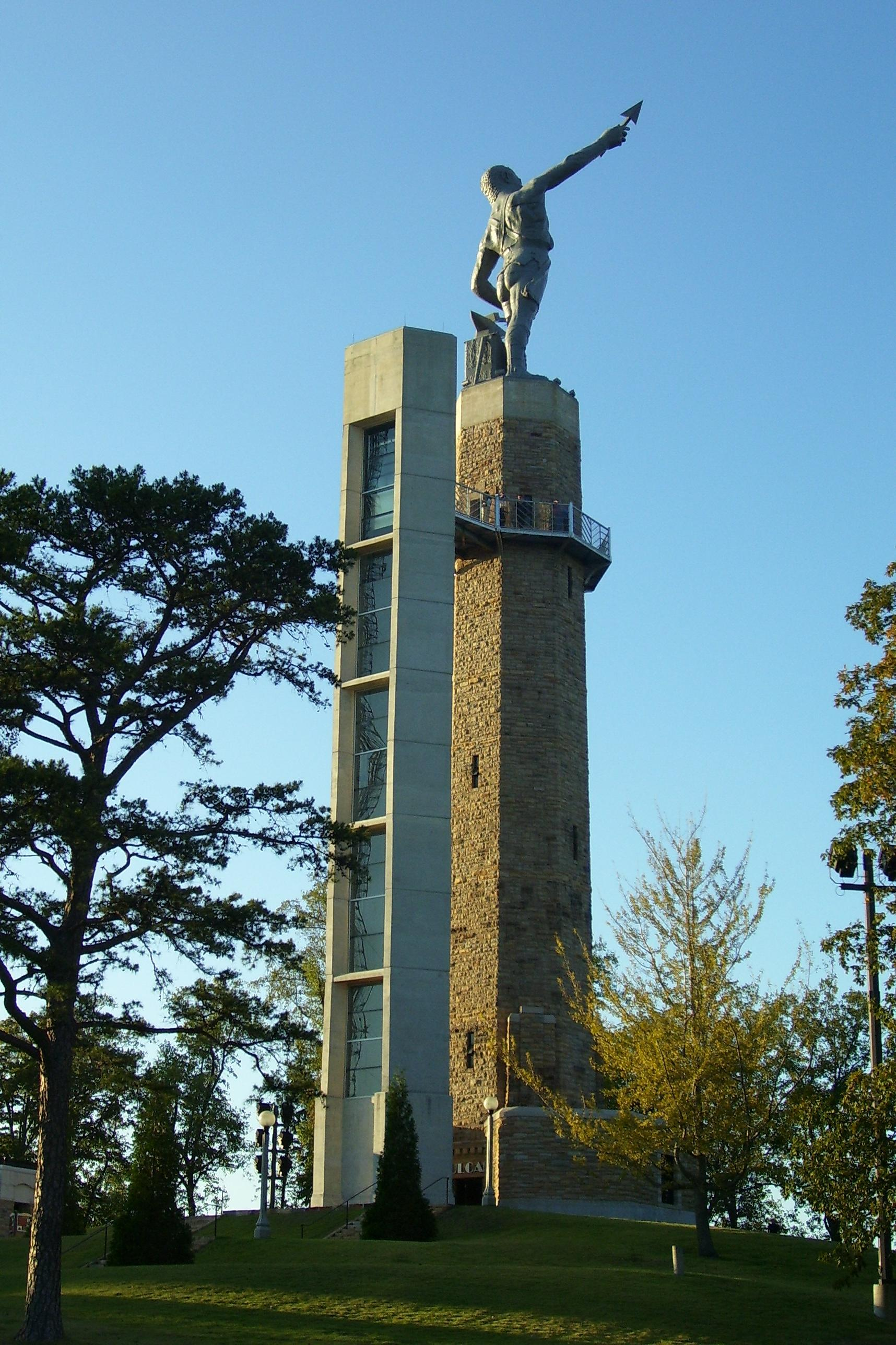
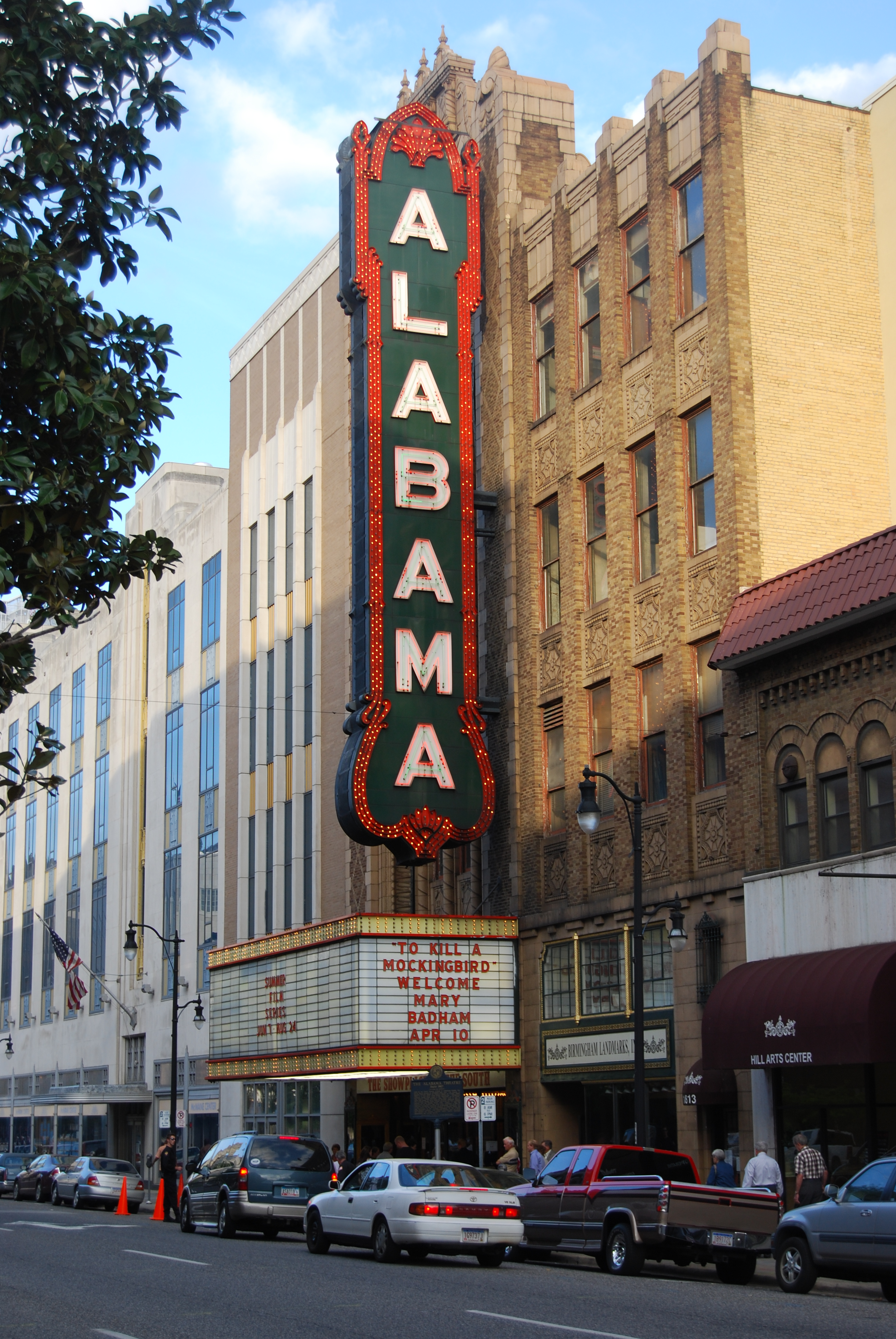
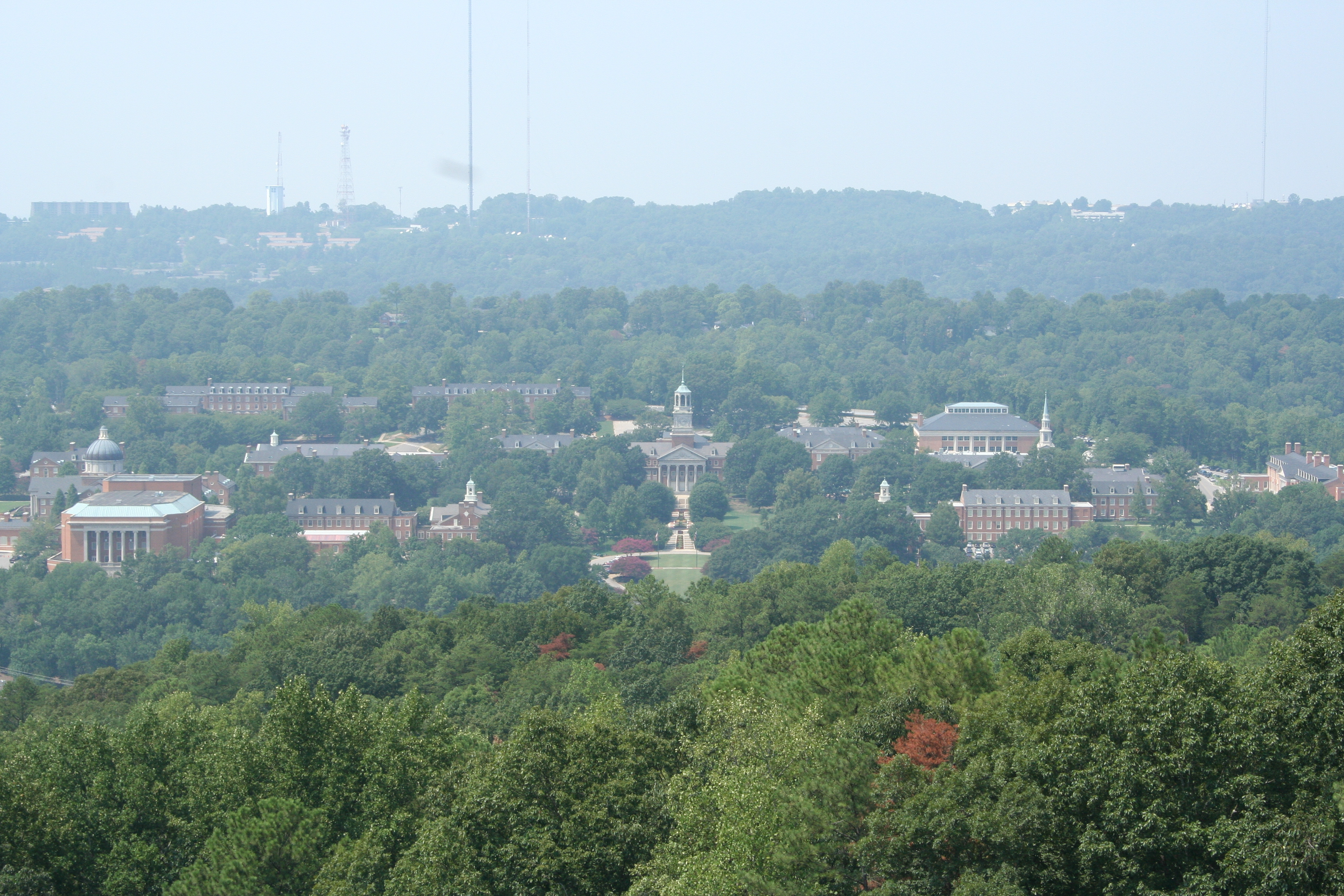
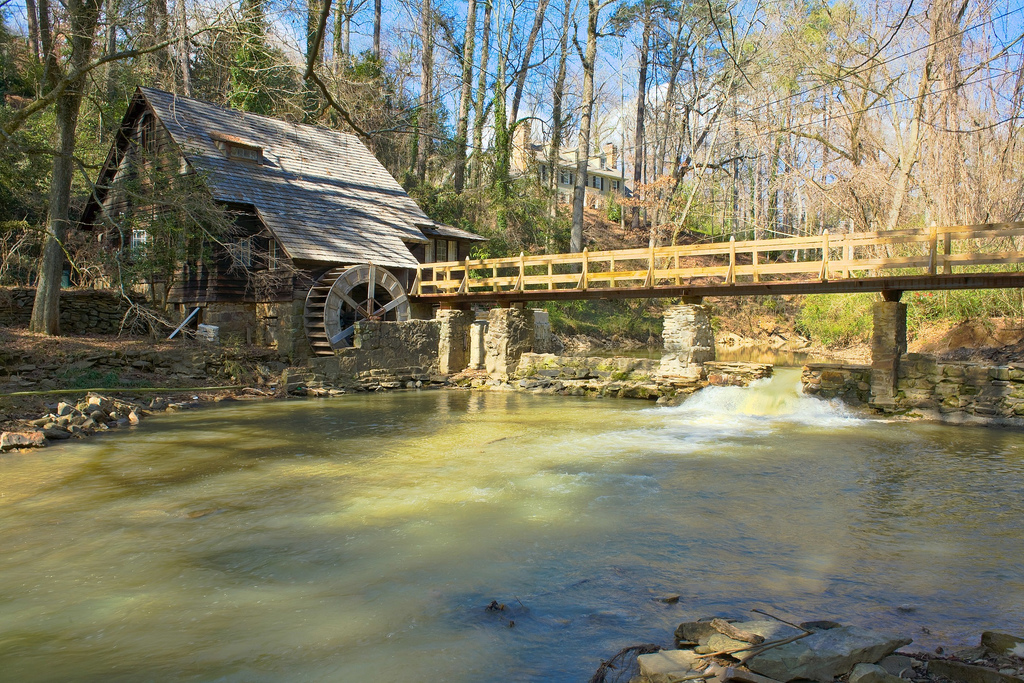
- Clockwise from top: Downtown Birmingham, Alabama Theatre in Downtown Birmingham, Old Mill in Mountain Brook, Aerial picture of Samford University in Homewood, Vulcan statue in Birmingham
Interactive Map of Birmingham–
Cullman–Talladega, AL CSA
City of Birmingham
City of Hoover
Birmingham, AL MSA
Talladega–Sylacauga, AL µSA
Cullman, AL µSA
- Country: United States
- State: Alabama
- Largest city: Birmingham
- Principal cities: Hoover; Vestavia Hills; Alabaster; Homewood; Trussville; Bessemer; Talladega; Sylacauga; Cullman

Area
  - Total: 4,566 sq mi (11,830 km^{2})

Population (2020)
  - Total: 1,115,289
  - Rank: 50th
  - Density: 217/sq mi (84/km^{2})

GDP
  - MSA: $79.098 billion (2022)
- Time zone: UTC−5 (CST)
  - Summer (DST): UTC−4 (CDT)
- Area codes: 205, 659
- Website: www.birminghamal.org

The Birmingham metropolitan area, sometimes known as Greater Birmingham, is a metropolitan area in north central Alabama centered on Birmingham, Alabama, United States.

As of 2023, the federal government defines the Birmingham, AL Metropolitan Statistical Area as consisting of seven counties (Bibb, Blount, Chilton, Jefferson, St. Clair, Shelby, and Walker) centered on Birmingham. The population of this metropolitan statistical area as of the 2020 census was 1,180,631, making it the 50th largest metropolitan statistical area in the United States as of that date.

The seven counties in the Birmingham metropolitan statistical area are combined with the Cullman micropolitan area (Cullman County) and the Talladega–Sylacauga Micropolitan Statistical Area (Talladega County and Coosa County) to form the federally defined Birmingham–Cullman–Talladega, AL Combined Statistical Area.

According to the 2020 census, the combined statistical area has a population of 1,415,988. It is the 42nd largest population sub-region in the United States, and the largest population region in Alabama, constituting roughly 1/4 of the state's population. It is the largest population region in Central Alabama. The northern counties of the Birmingham metro area specifically Blount and Cullman are also part of the North Alabama region also known locally as the Tennessee Valley and are overlapped by the much larger Birmingham metropolitan area despite its proximity to the nearby Huntsville metro. Nearby counties Tuscaloosa, Etowah, and Calhoun, while not officially a part of Greater Birmingham, contribute significantly to the region's economy. The Birmingham media market covers these counties as well. According to the List of metropolitan areas of Alabama, Birmingham is the largest urban area and metro in Alabama. Birmingham is part of the Piedmont Atlantic Megaregion containing an estimated 19 million people, while many residents also consider themselves part of the Deep South. It is classified as Southeast by the U.S. Census and also falls in the geographic area of the Upland South due to its location at the southern terminus of the Appalachian foothills. The entire MSA and CSA are within the congressional Appalachian Regional Commission's definition of Appalachia.

== Counties ==
Counties marked with an asterisk (*) are part of the Birmingham–Cullman–Talladega, AL Combined Statistical Area, but not the Birmingham, AL Metropolitan Statistical Area.

- Bibb
- Blount
- Chilton
- Jefferson
- St. Clair
- Shelby
- Walker
- Coosa*
- Talladega*
- Cullman*

County	2025 estimate	2020 census	Change	Area	Density
Jefferson County	665,742	674,721	−1.33%	1,111 sq mi (2,880 km^{2})	599/sq mi (231/km^{2})
Shelby County	238,552	223,024	+6.96%	785 sq mi (2,030 km^{2})	304/sq mi (117/km^{2})
St. Clair County	98,206	91,103	+7.80%	632 sq mi (1,640 km^{2})	155/sq mi (60/km^{2})
Walker County	65,140	65,342	−0.31%	805 sq mi (2,080 km^{2})	81/sq mi (31/km^{2})
Blount County	60,156	59,134	+1.73%	645 sq mi (1,670 km^{2})	93/sq mi (36/km^{2})
Chilton County	47,708	45,014	+5.98%	693 sq mi (1,790 km^{2})	69/sq mi (27/km^{2})
Bibb County	22,262	22,293	−0.14%	623 sq mi (1,610 km^{2})	36/sq mi (14/km^{2})
Total	1,197,766	1,180,631	+1.45%	4,489 sq mi (11,630 km^{2})	226/sq mi (87/km^{2})

== Cities ==
Historical population
Census	Pop.	Note	%±
1900	140,420		—
1910	226,476		61.3%
1920	310,054		36.9%
1930	431,493		39.2%
1940	459,930		6.6%
1950	556,926		21.1%
1960	812,094		45.8%
1970	833,075		2.6%
1980	930,281		11.7%
1990	956,844		2.9%
2000	1,052,238		10.0%
2010	1,061,024		0.8%
2020	1,115,289		5.1%
2025 (est.)	1,197,766		7.4%
U.S. Decennial Census

=== Anchor city ===
- Birmingham

=== Principal cities ===
- Cullman*
- Sylacauga*
- Talladega*

Cities marked with * are officially part of the Birmingham–Cullman–Talladega, AL Combined Statistical Area

=== Suburbs with at least 10,000 inhabitants as of the 2020 census ===
- Alabaster
- Bessemer
- Calera
- Center Point
- Chelsea
- Clay
- Fairfield
- Forestdale
- Gardendale
- Helena
- Homewood
- Hoover
- Hueytown
- Irondale
- Jasper
- Leeds
- McCalla
- Moody
- Mountain Brook
- Pelham
- Pell City
- Trussville
- Vestavia Hills

== Demographics ==
According to the 2019 ACS 1-Year Estimates Data Profiles, there were 1,090,435 people living in the Birmingham–Hoover, AL Metropolitan Area. The racial makeup of the area was 65.8% White, 31.6% African American, 1.9% Asian, 0.9% Native American, 0.1% Pacific Islander, 1.6% from other races, and 1.6% from two or more races. 4.5% of the population were Hispanic of any race.

== Economy ==
The economy of Greater Birmingham is the most diversified of any metropolitan area in Alabama. Many of the region's major employers are located in Birmingham and Jefferson County. The economy of Birmingham ranges from service industries such as banking and finance to health-related technological research and heavy industry. The University of Alabama at Birmingham (UAB) is Alabama's largest employer as well as the area's largest, with some 20,000 employees. The area is world headquarters for Regions Financial, and Books-A-Million, the second largest book retailer in the United States.

=== Major employers ===
- Alabama Power
- American Family Care
- Amazon
- AT&T
- Blue Cross and Blue Shield Association of Alabama
- Books-A-Million
- Drummond Company
- EBSCO Industries
- Encompass Health
- Hibbett Sports, Inc.
- Liberty National Life Insurance Co. (part of Torchmark)
- McWane, Inc.
- Motion Industries
- PNC Financial Services
- Regions Financial Corporation
- Royal Cup Coffee, Inc.
- Shipt
- Sloss Industries
- Southern Research Institute
- Spire Inc
- Torchmark
- University of Alabama at Birmingham
- Vulcan Materials Company
- Wells Fargo

=== Retail ===
Birmingham is known as the shopping destination in the state of Alabama and a primary shopping hub of the Piedmont Atlantic Megaregion. It includes the major retail destination for the region, the Riverchase Galleria mall, along with several other shopping centers and malls.

==== Major malls and shopping centers ====
- Riverchase Galleria, a 1,570,000 square foot, enclosed-mall in the southern suburb of Hoover.
- The Summit, a large, upscale lifestyle center near the Cahaba Heights neighborhood.
- Pinnacle at Tutwiler Farm, a lifestyle center in the eastern suburb of Trussville.
- The Shops At Grand River, an outlet mall in the eastern suburb of Leeds.

== Transportation ==
=== Road ===
Greater Birmingham is at the convergence of four major interstate highways: Interstate 65 (which connects with Mobile and Chicago); Interstate 20 (which connects with Dallas and Atlanta); Interstate 59 (which connects with New Orleans and Chattanooga); and Interstate 22 (which connects with Memphis). Interstate 459, completed in 1984, forms a southern bypass around Birmingham. It runs through portions of Bessemer, Vestavia Hills, and Trussville, and forms a main route through the primary city of Hoover. Interstate 422, the Birmingham Northern Bypass is planned to run from the current I-20/59/459 interchange near Bessemer to Interstate 59 and US Route 11 near Argo. It is planned to be completed by 2048.

Four U.S. highways, US-31, US-11, US-78, and US-280, run through Greater Birmingham. US-31 parallels Interstate 65 for its entire route, including Greater Birmingham. US-280 runs southeast of the city, connecting it with Auburn and Auburn University. The corridor through suburban Birmingham is notorious for its severe congestion as it carries about 200% of its traffic capacity. US-31 and 280 merge in Homewood to form the Elton B. Stephens Expressway known locally as the Red Mountain Expressway. This expressway goes through a geologic cut through Red Mountain, connecting downtown Birmingham to its southern suburbs. US-78 parallels Interstate 22 to the northwest of Birmingham, and Interstate 20 to the east. US-11 parallels Interstate 59 for its entire route. All four of these highways meet in downtown Birmingham.

=== Major highways ===
- Interstate 20
- Interstate 22
- Interstate 59
- Interstate 459
- Interstate 65
- U.S. Highway 11
- U.S. Highway 31
- U.S. Highway 78
- U.S. Highway 231
- U.S. Highway 280
- U.S. Highway 411

=== Mass transit ===
Birmingham received $87 million from the US Congress to help fund a regional transportation system. The city's new $30 million, three-block intermodal station brings Amtrak, Greyhound, the Birmingham-Jefferson County Transit Authority and automotive transportation together in one place.

=== Air ===
Greater Birmingham is served by Birmingham-Shuttlesworth International Airport with American Airlines, American Eagle, Southwest, United, and Delta providing service to more than 40 cities. Established in 1931, BHM has been governed by the Birmingham Airport Authority since its establishment in 1986. In 2008, the airport was renamed Birmingham-Shuttlesworth International Airport in honor of late Birmingham civil rights activist Rev. Fred Shuttlesworth.

== Education ==
=== Major colleges and universities ===
- Bevill State Community College
- Jefferson State Community College
- Lawson State Community College
- Miles College
- Samford University
- University of Alabama at Birmingham
- University of Montevallo

== Natural features ==
- Red Mountain
- Oak Mountain State Park
- Double Oak Mountain
- Ruffner Mountain
- Black Warrior River
- Cahaba River
- Cahaba River National Wildlife Refuge
- Talladega National Forest (Oakmulgee Division)
- Coosa River

== Rivers ==
- Cahaba River
- Black Warrior River
- Coosa River
- Locust Fork of the Black Warrior River
- Mulberry Fork of the Black Warrior River
- Sipsey Fork of the Black Warrior River

== See also ==
- Piedmont Atlantic
- Alabama statistical areas
- Table of United States Combined Statistical Areas
- Table of United States Metropolitan Statistical Areas
