= List of Georgia railroads =

The following railroads operate in the U.S. state of Georgia.

== Common freight carriers ==
- Adams-Warnock Railway (AWRY)
- Athens Line, LLC (ABR)
- Augusta and Summerville Railroad (AUS), operated by CSX and Norfolk Southern
- Chattahoochee Bay Railroad (CHAT)
- Chattahoochee Industrial Railroad (CIRR)
- Chattooga and Chickamauga Railway (CCKY)
- Columbus and Chattahoochee Railroad (CHH)
- CSX Transportation (CSXT)
- First Coast Railroad (FCRD)
- Fulton County Railway (FCR)
- Georgia and Southern Railway (GASR)
- Georgia Central Railway (GC)
- Georgia and Florida Railway (GFRR)
- Georgia Northeastern Railroad (GNRR)
- Georgia Southwestern Railroad (GSWR)
- Georgia Woodlands Railroad (GWRC)
- Golden Isles Terminal Railroad (GITM)
- Golden Isles Terminal Wharf (GITW)
- Great Walton Railroad (GRWR)
- Hartwell Railroad (HRT)
- Heart of Georgia Railroad (HOG)
- Louisville and Wadley Railway (LW) (Out of Service)
- Norfolk Southern Railway (NS) including subsidiaries Alabama Great Southern Railroad (AGS), Central of Georgia Railroad (CG), and Georgia Southern and Florida Railway (GSF)
- Ogeechee Railway (OGEE)
- Riceboro Southern Railway (RSOR)
- St. Mary's Railroad (SM)
- St. Mary's Railway West (SMW)
- Sandersville Railroad (SAN)
- Savannah Port Terminal Railroad (SAPT)
- Valdosta Railway (VR)

== Private carriers ==
- GAPS
- Georgia Power

== Passenger carriers ==
- Amtrak (AMTK)
- Metropolitan Atlanta Rapid Transit Authority
- River Street Streetcar
- Atlanta Streetcar

== Defunct railroads ==
Name	Mark	System (Note: This is one or more of the Class I railroads that the railroad became part of, if any.)	From	To	Successor	Notes
Abbeville and Waycross Railroad		SAL	1889	1896	Georgia and Alabama Railway	
Alabama and Chattanooga Railroad		SOU	1868	1877	Alabama Great Southern Railroad	
Alabama Midland Railway		ACL	1887	1901	Savannah, Florida and Western Railway	
Albany Bridge Company			1993	1999	Georgia and Florida RailNet	
Albany, Florida and Northern Railway		SOU	1889	1895	Albany and Northern Railway	
Albany and Northern Railway		SOU	1895	1971	Georgia Northern Railway	
Albany Passenger Terminal Company		ACL/ CG/ SAL/ SOU	1911			
Americus and Atlantic Railroad			1917	1926		
Americus, Preston and Lumpkin Railroad		SAL	1884	1888	Savannah, Americus and Montgomery Railway	
Athens Belt Line Railroad		SOU	1890			
Athens Terminal Company		SAL	1906	1981	N/A	
Atlanta and Birmingham Air Line Railway		SAL	1903	1909	Seaboard Air Line Railway	
Atlanta, Birmingham and Atlantic Railroad		ACL	1905	1916	Atlanta, Birmingham and Atlantic Railway	
Atlanta, Birmingham and Atlantic Railway		ACL	1915	1927	Atlanta, Birmingham and Coast Railroad	
Atlanta, Birmingham and Coast Railroad		ACL	1926	1946	Atlantic Coast Line Railroad	
Atlanta and Charlotte Air Line Railway		SOU	1877	1996	Norfolk Southern Railway	
Atlanta and Florida Railroad		SOU	1887	1893	Atlanta and Florida Railway	
Atlanta and Florida Railway		SOU	1893	1895	Southern Railway	
Atlanta and Hawkinsville Railroad		SOU	1886	1887	Atlanta and Florida Railroad	
Atlanta, Knoxville and Northern Railway		L&N	1896	1905	Louisville and Nashville Railroad	
Atlanta and LaGrange Railroad		ACL/ L&N	1847	1857	Atlanta and West Point Railroad	
Atlanta and Richmond Air-Line Railway		SOU	1870	1876	Georgia Air Line Railway	
Atlanta and Roswell Railroad		SOU	1863	1877	Roswell Railroad	
Atlanta, Stone Mountain and Lithonia Railway	ASML		1907	1997	N/A	
Atlanta Terminal Company		ACL/ CG/ L&N/ SOU	1903			
Atlanta and West Point Railroad	A&WP, AWP	ACL/ L&N	1857	1986	Seaboard System Railroad	
Atlantic and Birmingham Railroad		ACL	1901	1903	Atlantic and Birmingham Railway	
Atlantic and Birmingham Railway		ACL	1903	1906	Atlanta, Birmingham and Atlantic Railroad	
Atlantic Coast Line Railroad	ACL	ACL	1902	1967	Seaboard Coast Line Railroad	
Atlantic and Gulf Railroad	AGLF		1991	1999	Georgia and Florida RailNet	
Atlantic and Gulf Railroad	A&G	ACL	1856	1879	Savannah, Florida and Western Railway	
Atlantic and Gulf Short Line Railroad		G&F	1900	1907	Georgia and Florida Railway	
Atlantic Short Line Railway		CG	1892	1896	Bruton and Pineora Railway	
Atlantic, Valdosta and Western Railway		SOU	1897	1902	Georgia Southern and Florida Railway	
Atlantic, Waycross and Northern Railroad	AW&N		1911	1924	St. Mary's Railroad	
Augusta Belt Railway		ACL/ L&N	1896	1975	Georgia Railroad and Banking Company	
Augusta and Florida Railway		G&F	1904	1910	Georgia and Florida Railway	
Augusta, Gibson and Sandersville Railroad		G&F	1884	1893	Augusta Southern Railroad	
Augusta and Knoxville Railroad		ACL	1877	1886	Port Royal and Western Carolina Railway	
Augusta and Savannah Railroad		CG	1856	1948	Central of Georgia Railway	
Augusta Southern Railroad	AUS	G&F	1893	1919	Georgia and Florida Railway	
Augusta, Tallahassee and Gulf Railroad		SAL	1888	1891	Carrabelle, Tallahassee and Georgia Railroad	
Augusta Terminal Railway		ACL	1897	1906	Charleston and Western Carolina Railway	
Augusta Union Station Company		ACL/ L&N/ SOU	1901	1969	N/A	
Augusta and Waynesboro Railroad		CG	1838	1856	Augusta and Savannah Railroad	
Bainbridge Northeastern Railway			1907			
Bainbridge Northern Railway						
Blakely Southern Railroad	BLKS		1911	1914	N/A	
Blue Ridge and Atlantic Railroad		SOU	1887	1897	Tallulah Falls Railway	
Boston and Albany Railroad		SOU	1891	1895	Georgia Northern Railway	
Bostwick Railroad				1911	Greene County Railroad	
Bowden Lithia Springs Short Line Railroad			1887		N/A	
Bowdon Railroad and Transportation Company			1945	1953	Bowdon Railway	
Bowdon Railway			1953	1963	N/A	
Bowdon Railway			1910	1946	Bowdon Railroad and Transportation Company	
Brinson Railway		CG	1906	1914	Savannah and Northwestern Railway	
Broxton, Hazlehurst and Savannah Railroad				1907	Fitzgerald, Ocilla and Broxton Railroad	
Brunswick and Albany Railroad		ACL	1861	1882	Brunswick and Western Railroad	
Brunswick and Birmingham Railroad		ACL	1900	1904	Atlantic and Birmingham Railway	
Brunswick and Florida Railroad		ACL	1835	1861	Brunswick and Albany Railroad	
Brunswick and Pensacola Railroad						
Brunswick and Western Railroad		ACL	1882	1901	Savannah, Florida and Western Railway	
Bruton and Pineora Railway		CG	1897	1901	Central of Georgia Railway	
Buena Vista Railroad		CG	1880	1885	Buena Vista and Ellaville Railroad	
Buena Vista and Ellaville Railroad		CG	1885	1888	Savannah and Western Railroad	
Carrabelle, Tallahassee and Georgia Railroad		SAL	1891	1906	Georgia, Florida and Alabama Railway	
Cartersville and Van Wert Railroad		SAL	1866	1870	Cherokee Railroad	
Central Railroad and Banking Company of Georgia		CG	1835	1895	Central of Georgia Railway	
Central Railroad and Canal Company of Georgia		CG	1833	1835	Central Railroad and Banking Company of Georgia	
Central of Georgia Railway	CG	CG	1895	1971	Central of Georgia Railroad	
Charleston and Savannah Railroad		ACL	1854	1867	Savannah and Charleston Railroad	
Charleston and Savannah Railway		ACL	1880	1901	Savannah, Florida and Western Railway	
Charleston and Western Carolina Railway	C&WC, CWC	ACL	1896	1959	Atlantic Coast Line Railroad	
Charlotte, Columbia and Augusta Railroad		SOU	1869	1894	Southern Railway	
Chatham Terminal Company		CG/ SAL	1916			Still exists as a joint subsidiary of CSX Transportation and the Norfolk Southern Railway.
Chattahoochee Terminal Railway		SAL	1902	1903	Atlanta and Birmingham Air Line Railway	
Chattahoochee and Gulf Railroad	CHAT		2003	2006	Chattahoochee Bay Railroad	
Chattahoochee Valley Railroad			1895	1900	Chattahoochee Valley Railway	
Chattahoochee Valley Railway	CHV		1900	1992	N/A	
Chattanooga and Atlanta Railroad		SOU	1911	1911	Tennessee, Alabama and Georgia Railroad	
Chattanooga and Durham Railroad		CG	1897	1901	Central of Georgia Railway	
Chattanooga and Gulf Railroad		CG	1889	1891	Chickamauga and Durham Railroad	
Chattanooga and Lookout Mountain Railway						
Chattanooga, Rome and Columbus Railroad		CG	1887	1897	Chattanooga, Rome and Southern Railroad	
Chattanooga, Rome and Southern Railroad		CG	1897	1901	Central of Georgia Railway	
Chattanooga Southern Railroad		SOU	1896	1911	Tennessee, Alabama and Georgia Railroad	
Chattanooga Southern Railway		SOU	1887	1895	Chattanooga Southern Railroad	
Cherokee Railroad		SAL	1870	1879	Cherokee Iron Company	
Cherokee Iron Company		SAL	1873	1882	East and West Railroad of Alabama	
Chickamauga and Durham Railroad		CG	1891	1897	Chattanooga and Durham Railroad	
Cincinnati and Georgia Railroad		SOU	1881	1881	East Tennessee, Virginia and Georgia Railroad	
Collins and Glennville Railroad			1921	1941	N/A	
Collins and Ludowici Railroad			1920	1922	Collins and Glennville Railroad	
Collins and Reidsville Railroad			1895	1906	Georgia Coast and Piedmont Railroad	
Colonel's Island Railroad	CISD		1969	1998	Golden Isles Terminal Railroad	
Columbia and Augusta Railroad		SOU	1864	1869	Charlotte, Columbia and Augusta Railroad	
Columbus and Florida Railway		SAL	1885	1886	Columbus Southern Railway	
Columbus and Rome Railroad		CG	1879	1882	Columbus and Rome Railway	
Columbus and Rome Railway		CG	1882	1888	Savannah and Western Railroad	
Columbus Southern Railway		SAL	1886	1896	Columbus and Southern Railway	
Columbus and Southern Railway		SAL	1896	1896	Georgia and Alabama Railway	
Columbus and Western Railway		CG	1883	1888	Savannah and Western Railroad	
Covington and Macon Railroad		CG	1885	1891	Macon and Northern Railroad	
Cuyler and Woodburn Railroad			1894	1897	Savannah and Statesboro Railway	
Dalton and Gadsden Railroad		SOU	1854	1859	Dalton and Jacksonville Railroad	
Dalton and Jacksonville Railroad		SOU	1859	1866	Selma, Rome and Dalton Railroad	
Darien Short Line Railroad			1885	1894	Darien and Western Railroad	
Darien and Western Railroad			1894	1906	Georgia Coast and Piedmont Railroad	
Dooly Southern Railway						
Douglas, Augusta and Gulf Railway		G&F	1905	1907	Georgia and Florida Railway	
Douglas and McDonald Railroad						
Dover and Statesboro Railroad		CG	1889	1901	Central of Georgia Railway	
Dublin and Southwestern Railroad		CG	1904	1907	Wrightsville and Tennille Railroad	
Dublin and Wrightsville Railroad		CG	1885	1886	Wrightsville and Tennille Railroad	
East Georgia Railway			1916			
East Georgia and Florida Railroad		ACL	1881	1888	Savannah, Florida and Western Railway	
East Tennessee and Georgia Railroad		SOU	1848	1869	East Tennessee, Virginia and Georgia Railroad	
East Tennessee, Virginia and Georgia Railroad	SOU		1869	1886	East Tennessee, Virginia and Georgia Railway	
East Tennessee, Virginia and Georgia Railway	SOU		1886	1894	Southern Railway	
East and West Railroad		SAL	1896	1903	Atlanta and Birmingham Air Line Railway	
East and West Railroad of Alabama		SAL	1882	1893	East and West Railroad	
Eatonton Branch Railroad		CG	1850	1896	Middle Georgia and Atlantic Railway	
Eatonton and Machen Railroad		CG	1889	1889	Middle Georgia and Atlantic Railway	
Elberton Air Line Railroad		SOU	1871	1908	Elberton Southern Railway	
Elberton and Eastern Railroad	E&E	ACL/ L&N	1916	1933	N/A	
Elberton and Eastern Railway		ACL/ L&N	1911	1916	Elberton and Eastern Railroad	
Elberton Southern Railway		SOU	1908	1996	Norfolk Southern Railway	
Ellijay Railroad		L&N	1854	1859	Marietta, Canton and Ellijay Railroad	
Empire and Dublin Railroad		CG	1888	1892	Oconee and Western Railroad	
Fitzgerald, Ocilla and Broxton Railroad			1907			
Fitzgerald, Ocmulgee and Red Bluff Railway						
Flint River and Gulf Railway		SOU	1901	1907	Gulf Line Railway	
Flint River and Northeastern Railroad	FR&N		1903	1946	N/A (affiliated with Georgia Northern Railway)	
Florida Central Railroad			1907	1914	N/A (portion in Florida sold to Savannah, Florida and Western Railway)	
Florida Central and Peninsular Railroad		SAL	1892	1903	Seaboard Air Line Railway	
Florida Midland and Georgia Railroad		G&F	1884	1894	Valdosta Southern Railway	
Florida Northern Railroad		SAL	1892	1893	Florida Central and Peninsular Railroad	
Flovilla and Indian Springs Railway			1897			
Foy Railroad						
Gainesville, Jefferson and Southern Railroad		ACL/ L&N, SAL	1872	1904	Gainesville Midland Railway, Monroe Railroad	
Gainesville Midland Railroad	GM	SAL	1936			Still exists as a subsidiary of CSX Transportation. On August 6, 2010, notice was published of the intent to merge the Gainesville Midland Railroad into CSX Transportation, effective August 20, 2010.
Gainesville Midland Railway		SAL	1904	1938	Gainesville Midland Railroad	
Gainesville and Northwestern Railroad			1912	1934	N/A	
Gate City Terminal Company		ACL	1906	1907	Georgia Terminal Company	
Georgia Railroad	GA	ACL/ L&N	1881	1982	Seaboard Coast Line Railroad	
Georgia Railroad		ACL/ L&N	1833	1835	Georgia Railroad and Banking Company	
Georgia Railroad and Banking Company		ACL/ L&N	1835	1982	Seaboard Coast Line Railroad	
Georgia Air Line Railroad		SOU	1856	1870	Atlanta and Richmond Air-Line Railway	
Georgia Air Line Railway		SOU	1877	1877	Atlanta and Charlotte Air Line Railway	
Georgia and Alabama Railroad	GAAB		1989	1995	Georgia Southwestern Railroad	
Georgia and Alabama Railroad		SOU	1854	1866	Selma, Rome and Dalton Railroad	
Georgia and Alabama Railway		SAL	1895	1902	Seaboard Air Line Railway	
Georgia and Alabama Terminal Company		SAL	1898			
Georgia, Ashburn, Sylvester and Camilla Railway		SOU	1922	1971	Georgia Northern Railway	
Georgia, Carolina and Northern Railway		SAL	1886	1901	Seaboard Air Line Railway	
Georgia Coast and Piedmont Railroad			1906	1919	Collins and Glennville Railroad	
Georgia Eastern Railroad	GERY		1987	1988	Georgia Woodlands Railroad	
Georgia Eastern Railway					Bainbridge Northeastern Railway	
Georgia and Florida RailNet	GFRR		1999	2005	Georgia and Florida Railway	
Georgia and Florida Railroad	GFRR		1995	1999	Georgia and Florida RailNet	
Georgia and Florida Railroad	G&F	G&F (SOU)	1926	1963	Georgia and Florida Railway	
Georgia and Florida Railway	G&F, GF	SOU	1963	1971	Central of Georgia Railroad	
Georgia and Florida Railway	G&F	G&F	1906	1926	Georgia and Florida Railroad	
Georgia, Florida and Alabama Railroad	GF&A	SAL	1927	1974	Seaboard Coast Line Railroad	
Georgia, Florida and Alabama Railway	GF&A	SAL	1901	1928	Georgia, Florida and Alabama Railroad	
Georgia and Florida Terminal Company		G&F	1910	1920	Georgia and Florida Railway	
Georgia Great Southern Railroad	GGS		1991	1995	Georgia Southwestern Railroad	
Georgia Midland Railway		SOU	1896	1996	Norfolk Southern Railway	
Georgia Midland and Gulf Railroad		SOU	1885	1896	Georgia Midland Railway	
Georgia Midland Terminal Company		SOU	1890	1941	Southern Railway	
Georgia Northern Railway	GANO	SOU	1894	1993	Georgia Southern and Florida Railway	
Georgia Pacific Railroad		SOU	1876	1882	Georgia Pacific Railway	
Georgia Pacific Railway		SOU	1882	1894	Southern Railway	
Georgia Western Railroad		SOU	1854	1877	Georgia Pacific Railroad	
Georgia Pine Railway		SAL	1895	1901	Georgia, Florida and Alabama Railway	
Georgia Southern Railroad		SOU	1875	1880	East Tennessee, Virginia and Georgia Railroad	
Georgia Southern and Florida Railroad		SOU	1881	1895	Georgia Southern and Florida Railway	
Georgia Southwestern and Gulf Railroad	GS&G	SOU	1906	1942	N/A	Leased the Albany and Northern Railway.
Georgia Terminal Company		ACL	1907	1916	Atlanta, Birmingham and Atlantic Railway	
Girard Railroad		CG	1845	1854	Mobile and Girard Railroad	
Greene County Railroad	GCY		1911	1941	N/A	
Greenville and Newnan Railway		CG	1905	1905	Central of Georgia Railway	
Griffin, Monticello and Madison Railroad			1870	1891	N/A	
Gulf Line Railway		SOU	1907	1913	Hawkinsville and Florida Southern Railway	
Hartwell Railroad			1879	1898	Hartwell Railway	
Hartwell Railway	HRT		1898	1990	Hartwell Railroad	
Hawkinsville and Florida Southern Railway		SOU	1896	1922	Georgia, Ashburn, Sylvester and Camilla Railway	
Hawkinsville and Western Railroad						
Hiwassee Railroad		SOU	1847	1848	East Tennessee and Georgia Railroad	
Indian Springs and Flovilla Railroad			1881	1897	Flovilla and Indian Springs Railway	
Iron Belt Railroad				1903	N/A	
Lakeland Railway			1928	1957	N/A	
Lawrenceville Branch Railroad		SOU	1877	1920	N/A	
Lexington Terminal Railroad		ACL/ L&N	1887	1947	N/A	
Liberty City, Glennville and Manassas Railway				1905	Reidsville and Southeastern Railroad	
Lithonia and Arabia Mountain Railway			1913	1935	N/A	
Live Oak, Perry and Georgia Railroad			1995	1999	Georgia and Florida RailNet	
Live Oak, Perry and South Georgia Railway	LPSG	SOU	1971	1993	Georgia Southern and Florida Railway	
Loganville and Lawrenceville Railroad		SAL	1898	1902	Seaboard Air Line Railway	
Louisville and Nashville Railroad	L&N, LN	L&N	1905	1983	Seaboard System Railroad	
Louisville Branch Railroad		CG	1872	1879	Louisville and Wadley Railroad	
Louisville and Wadley Railroad	L&WD	CG	1879	1961	Louisville and Wadley Railway	
Macon and Atlantic Railway		CG	1890	1892	Atlantic Short Line Railway	
Macon and Augusta Railroad		ACL/ L&N	1866	1880	Georgia Railroad and Banking Company	
Macon and Birmingham Railroad			1888	1895	Macon and Birmingham Railway	
Macon and Birmingham Railway			1896			
Macon and Brunswick Railroad		SOU	1856	1881	Cincinnati and Georgia Railroad	
Macon and Dublin Railroad		SAL	1885	1890	Macon, Dublin and Savannah Railroad	
Macon, Dublin and Savannah Railroad	MD&S	SAL	1890	1958	Seaboard Air Line Railroad	
Macon and Northern Railroad		CG	1891	1894	Macon and Northern Railway	
Macon and Northern Railway		CG	1894	1895	Central of Georgia Railway	
Macon Terminal Company	MTCO	CG/ SOU	1914			
Macon and Western Railroad		CG	1845	1872	Central Railroad and Banking Company of Georgia	
Marietta, Canton and Ellijay Railroad		L&N	1859	1870	Marietta and North Georgia Railroad	
Marietta and North Georgia Railroad		L&N	1870	1887	Marietta and North Georgia Railway	
Marietta and North Georgia Railway		L&N	1887	1895	Atlanta, Knoxville and Northern Railway	
McRae Terminal Railway		SAL	1905			
Memphis Branch Railroad			1868	1877	N/A	
Memphis Branch Railroad and Steamboat Company of Georgia		L&N	1839	1850	Rome Railroad	
Middle Georgia and Atlantic Railway		CG	1889	1896	Central of Georgia Railway	
Midland Railway		G&F	1915	1923	Statesboro Northern Railway	
Midville, Swainsboro and Red Bluff Railroad		G&F	1888	1900	Atlantic and Gulf Short Line Railroad	
Milledgeville Railroad		ACL/ L&N	1837	1866	Macon and Augusta Railroad	
Milledgeville Railway		ACL/ L&N	1896	1972	N/A	
Milledgeville and Asylum Dummy Railroad		ACL/ L&N	1888	1893	Old Capital Railway	
Milledgeville and Gordon Railroad		CG	1847	1859	Central Railroad and Banking Company of Georgia	
Milledgeville Turnpike or Railroad Company		CG	1840	1847	Milledgeville and Gordon Railroad	
Millen and Southern Railway		G&F	1890	1897	Millen and Southwestern Railroad	
Millen and Southwestern Railroad		G&F	1897	1907	Georgia and Florida Railway	
Milltown Air Line Railway			1903	1928	Lakeland Railway	
Milstead Railroad	MLST		1909	1959		
Mobile and Girard Railroad		CG	1854	1895	Central of Georgia Railway	
Monroe Railroad		ACL/ L&N	1904	1975	Georgia Railroad and Banking Company	
Monroe Railroad		CG	1833	1836	Monroe Railroad and Banking Company	
Monroe Railroad and Banking Company		CG	1836	1845	Central Railroad and Banking Company of Georgia	
Montgomery Railroad		ACL/ L&N	1834	1842	Montgomery and West Point Railroad	
Montgomery and West Point Railroad		ACL/ L&N	1843	1870	Western Railroad of Alabama	
Nashville and Chattanooga Railroad		L&N	1845	1873	Nashville, Chattanooga and St. Louis Railway	
Nashville, Chattanooga and St. Louis Railway	N&C, NC	L&N	1873	1957	Louisville and Nashville Railroad	
Nashville and Sparks Railroad		G&F	1900	1907	Georgia and Florida Railway	
North Eastern Railroad		SOU	1854	1895	Southern Railway	
North and South Railroad of Georgia		CG	1870	1878	Columbus and Rome Railroad	
Ocilla and Irwinville Railroad		ACL	1900	1903	Brunswick and Birmingham Railroad	
Ocilla, Pinebloom and Valdosta Railroad		G&F	1905	1906	Douglas, Augusta and Gulf Railway	
Ocilla Southern Railroad	OSO		1908	1924	N/A	
Ocilla and Valdosta Railroad						
Ocilla and Worth Railroad						
Oconee and Western Railroad		CG	1892	1899	Wrightsville and Tennille Railroad	
Offerman and Western Railroad		ACL	1899	1902	Brunswick and Birmingham Railroad	
Ogeechee Railway	OGEE		1989			Still exists as a lessor of the Georgia Midland Railroad and Heart of Georgia Railroad.
Old Capital Railway		ACL/ L&N	1893	1896	Milledgeville Railway	
Pelham and Havana Railroad			1906	1924	N/A	
Plant System		ACL	1894	1902	Atlantic Coast Line Railroad	
Port Royal Railroad		ACL	1859	1878	Port Royal and Augusta Railway	
Port Royal and Augusta Railway		ACL	1878	1896	Charleston and Western Carolina Railway	
Port Royal and Western Carolina Railway		ACL	1887	1896	Charleston and Western Carolina Railway	
Raleigh and Gaston Railroad		SAL	1889	1900	Seaboard Air Line Railway	
Register and Glenville Railroad				1916	East Georgia Railway	
Reidsville and Southeastern Railroad			1905	1906	Georgia Coast and Piedmont Railroad	
Richmond and Danville Railroad		SOU	1879	1894	Southern Railway	
Rogers and Summit Railroad		G&F	1889	1889	Millen and Southern Railway	
Rome Railroad		L&N	1850	1896	Nashville, Chattanooga and St. Louis Railway	
Rome and Carrollton Railroad		CG	1881	1887	Chattanooga, Rome and Columbus Railroad	
Rome and Decatur Railroad		SOU	1883	1889	East Tennessee, Virginia and Georgia Railway	
Rome and Northern Railroad	R&N		1909	1923	Rome and Northern Railway	
Rome and Northern Railway			1923	1924	N/A	
Roswell Railroad		SOU	1880	1920	Roswell Branch Railroad	
Roswell Branch Railroad			1920	1921	N/A	
St. Mary's and Kingsland Railroad			1906	1911	Atlantic, Waycross and Northern Railroad	
Sandersville and Tennille Railroad		G&F	1875	1894	Augusta Southern Railroad	
Savannah and Albany Railroad		ACL	1847	1854	Savannah, Albany and Gulf Railroad	
Savannah, Albany and Gulf Railroad		ACL	1854	1863	Atlantic and Gulf Railroad	
Savannah, Americus and Montgomery Railway		SAL	1888	1895	Georgia and Alabama Railway	
Savannah and Atlanta Railway	SA	CG	1915	1971	Central of Georgia Railroad	
Savannah and Atlantic Railroad		CG	1890	1895	Central of Georgia Railway	
Savannah, Augusta and Northern Railway			1906	1910	Midland Railway	
Savannah and Charleston Railroad		ACL	1867	1880	Charleston and Savannah Railway	
Savannah and Columbus Railway		SAL	1888	1888	Savannah and Western Railroad	
Savannah, Dublin and Western Short Line Railway		CG	1886	1889	Savannah and Western Railroad	
Savannah, Florida and Western Railway		ACL	1876	1902	Atlantic Coast Line Railroad	
Savannah, Griffin and North Alabama Railroad		CG	1854	1890	Savannah and Western Railroad	
Savannah and Northwestern Railway	S&NW	CG	1914	1917	Savannah and Atlanta Railway	
Savannah River Terminal Company		ACL/ L&N	1916	1990	CSX Transportation	
Savannah and Southern Railway						
Savannah State Docks Railroad	SSDK		1952	1998	Savannah Port Terminal Railroad	
Savannah and Statesboro Railway		G&F	1897	1933	Statesboro Terminal Company	
Savannah, Thunderbolt and Isle of Hope Railway						
Savannah and Tybee Island Railway		CG	1885	1889	Savannah and Atlantic Railroad	
Savannah Union Railroad and Terminal Company		CG	1912	1914	Savannah and Northwestern Railway	
Savannah Union Station Company		ACL/ SAL/ SOU	1900			
Savannah Valley Railroad		CG	1908	1910	Brinson Railway	
Savannah and Western Railroad		CG	1885	1895	Central of Georgia Railway	
Seaboard Air Line Railroad	SAL	SAL	1946	1967	Seaboard Coast Line Railroad	
Seaboard Air Line Railway		SAL	1900	1945	Seaboard Air Line Railroad	
Seaboard Air Line System		SAL	1893	1900	Seaboard Air Line Railway	
Seaboard Air Line Belt Railroad		SAL	1892	1901	Seaboard Air Line Railway	
Seaboard Coast Line Railroad	SCL		1967	1983	Seaboard System Railroad	
Seaboard and Roanoke Railroad		SAL	1889	1900	Seaboard Air Line Railway	
Seaboard System Railroad	SBD		1983	1986	CSX Transportation	
Selma, Rome and Dalton Railroad		SOU	1866	1874	Georgia Southern Railroad	
Shearwood Railway			1912	1937	N/A	
Smithonia, Danielsville and Carnesville Railroad			1889			
Smithonia and Dunlap Railroad						
South Bound Railroad		SAL	1888	1901	Seaboard Air Line Railway	
South Carolina Railroad		SOU	1843	1881	South Carolina Railway	
South Carolina Railway		SOU	1881	1894	South Carolina and Georgia Railroad	
South Carolina and Georgia Railroad		SOU	1894	1902	Southern Railway – Carolina Division	
South Georgia Railway		SOU	1896	1971	Live Oak, Perry and South Georgia Railway	
South Georgia and Florida Railroad		ACL	1857	1868	Atlantic and Gulf Railroad	
Southern Railway	SOU	SOU	1894	1990	Norfolk Southern Railway	
Southern Railway – Carolina Division		SOU	1902	1996	Norfolk Southern Railway	
Southwestern Railroad		CG	1845			Still exists as a lessor of Norfolk Southern Railway operating subsidiary Central of Georgia Railroad.
Sparks, Moultrie and Gulf Railroad				1903	N/A	
Sparks-Western Railroad		G&F	1908	1911	Georgia and Florida Railway	
Statenville Railway			1910	1924	N/A	
Statesboro Northern Railway		G&F	1924	1951	N/A	
Statesboro Terminal Company		G&F	1933	1951	N/A	
Stillmore Air Line Railway		CG	1892	1906	Wadley Southern Railway	
Sylvania Railroad		CG	1884	1902	Sylvania Central Railway	
Sylvania Railway			1935	1944	N/A (leased the Sylvania Central Railway)	
Sylvania Central Railway	SYC	CG	1903	1954	N/A	
Sylvania and Girard Railroad			1905	1915	N/A (leased the Sylvania Central Railway)	
Talbotton Branch Railroad			1872	1881	Talbotton Railroad	
Talbotton Railroad			1881	1956	N/A	
Tallulah Falls Railway	TF	SOU	1898	1961	N/A	
Tennessee, Alabama and Georgia Railroad	TA&G, TAG	SOU	1922			Still exists as a subsidiary of the Norfolk Southern Railway; all Georgia trackage has been leased to the Chattooga and Chickamauga Railway since 1989.
Tennessee, Alabama and Georgia Railway		SOU	1911	1922	Tennessee, Alabama and Georgia Railroad	
Tennessee and Cohutta Railroad		SOU	1882	1882	Tennessee State Line Railroad	
Tennessee State Line Railroad		SOU	1882	1886	East Tennessee, Virginia and Georgia Railroad	
Thomaston and Barnesville Railroad		CG	1839	1860	Upson County Railroad	
Thomasville Railroad		SAL	1879	1888	Augusta, Tallahassee and Gulf Railroad	
Thomasville, Tallahassee and Gulf Railroad		SAL	1882	1888	Augusta, Tallahassee and Gulf Railroad	
Tifton and Moultrie Railway				1903	N/A	
Tifton and Northeastern Railroad		ACL	1891	1903	Atlantic and Birmingham Railway	
Tifton Terminal Company						
Tifton, Thomasville and Gulf Railway		ACL	1897	1903	Atlantic and Birmingham Railway	
Union Point and White Plains Railroad		ACL/ L&N	1886	1927	N/A	
Upson County Railroad		CG	1860	1914	Central of Georgia Railway	
Valdosta, Moultrie and Western Railroad			1909	1917	Valdosta, Moultrie and Western Railway	
Valdosta, Moultrie and Western Railway			1917			
Valdosta Southern Railroad	VSO		1951	1992	Valdosta Railway	
Valdosta Southern Railway		G&F	1894	1907	Georgia and Florida Railway	
Villa Rica Branch Railway		SOU	1901	1902	Southern Railway	
Wadley and Mount Vernon Railroad		CG	1889	1906	Wadley Southern Railway	
Wadley and Mount Vernon Extension Railroad		G&F	1902	1905	Douglas, Augusta and Gulf Railway	
Wadley Southern Railroad			1962	1964	N/A	
Wadley Southern Railway	WDS	CG	1906	1962	Wadley Southern Railroad	
Walton Railroad		ACL/ L&N	1872	1884	Gainesville, Jefferson and Southern Railroad	
Washington and Lincolnton Railroad			1914	1932	N/A	
Washington Rail or Plank Road Company		ACL/ L&N	1850	1852	Georgia Railroad and Banking Company	
Waycross Air Line Railroad		ACL	1887	1901	Atlantic and Birmingham Railroad	Still exists as a portion of CSX Transportation's Fitzgerald Subdivision.
Waycross and Florida Railroad		ACL	1879	1884	Savannah, Florida and Western Railway	
Waycross and Southern Railroad			1910	1928	N/A	
Waycross and Western Railroad						
Western Railroad of Alabama		ACL/ L&N	1870	1883	Western Railway of Alabama	
Western Railway of Alabama	WA	ACL/ L&N	1883	2002	CSX Transportation	
Western and Atlantic Railroad		L&N	1836			Still exists as a lessor of CSX Transportation.
Willacoochee and Dupont Railroad						
Wills Valley Railroad		SOU	1854	1868	Alabama and Chattanooga Railroad	
Wrightsville and Sun Hill Railroad		CG	1883	1883	Wrightsville and Tennille Railroad	
Wrightsville and Tennille Railroad	W&TR, WTR	CG	1883	1971	Central of Georgia Railroad	
