= Columbus Southern Railway =

Historic railroad in Georgia, U.S.

Overview
- Locale: Southwest Georgia, Northwest Florida
- Dates of operation: 1896–1944
- Successor: Georgia and Alabama Railway

Technical
- Track gauge: 1,435 mm (4 ft 8 1/2 in) (standard gauge)
- Length: 88 miles (142 km)

The Columbus Southern Railway is a historic railroad that operated in the U.S. state of Georgia. The railroad operated an 88-mile line from Columbus to Albany that opened in 1890.

== History ==
It was originally chartered in 1885 as the Columbus and Florida Railway. The Columbus Southern Railway was created in 1886 after the C&F's charter was amended. It rapidly ran into financial difficulties. In 1889 the State of Georgia demanded its assets be handed over to local counties for unpaid taxes. The company fought the order and the case made its way to the Supreme Court which in 1894 decided in Columbus Southern Ry. Co. v. Wright that the 14th Amendment did not protect the company from these actions.

Soon after the decision the railway was sold to John Skelton Williams's Georgia and Alabama Railway in 1896.

In January 1899, John Skelton Williams's syndicate offered to purchase a majority of shares in railroads along the east coast of the United States that would become the Seaboard Air Line Railroad. By 1900, the Georgia and Alabama Railway formally became part of the Seaboard Air Line. John Skelton Williams served as the first president of the Seaboard Air Line, and he would later serve as the United States Comptroller of the Currency.

The Seaboard Air Line discontinued passenger service from Columbus to Albany in 1932 and the line became a freight-only line.

In 1944, the Seaboard Air Line acquired the Georgia Florida and Alabama Railway (GF&A), which paralleled the Columbus Southern between Richland and Kimbrough. As a result, the Seaboard Air Line abandoned the former Columbus Southern between Richland and Kimbrough and consolidated service on the former GF&A. The Seaboard then designated the former Columbus Southern north of Richland (along with the GF&A) as their Richland Subdivision. The Columbus Southern south of Kimbrough became their Albany Subdivision.

In 1967, the Seaboard Air Line merged with its rival, the Atlantic Coast Line Railroad, and the combined company was named the Seaboard Coast Line Railroad. The former Columbus Southern segments continued to operate, though the segment from Kimbrough to Albany was renamed the Kimbrough Subdivision. By 1982, track had been abandoned from Kimbrough to Dawson and the remaining segment from Dawson to Albany was known as the Dawson Subdivision.

In 1980, the Seaboard Coast Line's parent company merged with the Chessie System, creating the CSX Corporation. The CSX Corporation initially operated the Chessie and Seaboard Systems separately until 1986, when they were merged into CSX Transportation.

CSX sold much of the line to the Georgia Southwestern in 1989.

The Georgia Southwestern abandoned the line from Cusseta to Richland in 1995, with the rails being removed in September 1997. Rails remained in place from Columbus to Cusseta in order to serve a large pulpwood yard near the latter which are still in place today but are out of service.

At the south end, the line was abandoned from Albany to Sasser in 1994. The Georgia Southwestern still operates the remaining line from Sasser to Dawson.

== Historic stations ==
Milepost	City/Location	Station	Connections and notes
SLB 0.0	Columbus	Union Station	junction with: Georgia Midland and Gulf Railroad (SOU); Buena Vista and Ellaville Railroad (CoG/SOU); Columbus and Rome Railway (CoG/SOU); Chattanooga, Rome and Columbus Railroad (CoG/SOU)
SLB 3.8		Fort Benning	junction with Fort Benning Railroad
SLB 6.6		Sand Hill	
SLB 10.5		Ochillee	
SLB 13.4		Central Springs	
SLB 18.5		Cusetta	
SLB 27.8		Renfroe	
SLB 32.3		Brooklyn	
SLB 38.3	Richland	Richland	junction with: Georgia and Florida Railway (SAL); Georgia Florida and Alabama Railway (SAL)
SLB 44.7		Kimbrough	junction with Georgia Florida and Alabama Railway (SAL)
SLB 47.8		Weston	
SLB 55.7	Parrott, Georgia	Parrott	
SLB 64.9	Dawson	Dawson	junction with Southwestern Railroad (CoG/SOU)
SLB 71.8	Sasser	Sasser	
SLB 87.2	Albany	Albany	junction with: Brunswick and Western Railroad (SF&W/ACL); Savannah, Florida and Western Railway Albany Division (ACL); Central of Georgia Railway; Albany and Northern Railway (SOU); Georgia Northern Railway (SOU)
