= Short line =

Short Line or Shortline may refer to:

== Railroad ==
=== General usage ===
- Shortline railroad, an independent railroad company that operates over a relatively short distance

=== Railways ===
- Atlantic and Gulf Short Line Railroad, a former railway in Georgia
- Atlantic Short Line Railway, a former railway in Georgia
- Baltimore and Ohio Short Line Railroad, a former railway in Pennsylvania
- Bowden Lithia Springs Short Line Railroad, a former narrow-gauge railroad that operated in Georgia
- Carey Short Line, a former railroad in Ohio
- Cleveland Short Line Railway, a freight bypass around southern Cleveland, Ohio
- Darien Short Line Railroad, a former railway in Georgia
- Electric Short Line Railway, a former railroad that operated in Minnesota
- Georgia Northeastern Railroad, a Marietta-based railroad that runs from Atlanta to Ellijay
- New York Short Line, a former railway line in Pennsylvania
- Nevada Short Line Railway, a former narrow-gauge railroad in Nevada
- Oil Fields Short Line Railroad, a former railroad that operated in Oklahoma
- Oregon Short Line Railroad, a former railroad in Wyoming, Idaho, Utah, Montana and Oregon
- Pasadena Short Line, a former passenger railway line in the Los Angeles area
- Shortlines, a passenger rail operator in Poland
- Short Line, alternate name for the Merriam Park Subdivision, a section of railroad between Minneapolis and St. Paul, Minnesota
- Short Line Subdivision (Ohio), a belt line around Cleveland, Ohio
- Short Line Subdivision (West Virginia), a railroad line in West Virginia
- Skaneateles Short Line Railroad, a railroad that operated in the state of New York 1840–1981
- St. Louis and Hannibal Railroad, a railroad in Missouri nicknamed the "Short Line"
- Venice Short Line, a former interurban railway line in Los Angeles
- Waycross Short Line, unofficial name of a former railroad that ran from Waycross, Georgia to Jacksonville, Florida
- Yosemite Short Line Railway, a former narrow-gauge railway in the Yosemite region of California

== Other uses ==
- American Short Line and Regional Railroad Association, an association of North American short line and regional railroads
- Fossil Oregon Short Line Depot, a historic railroad depot in the U.S. state of Wyoming
- Layton Oregon Short Line Railroad Station, a historic railroad depot in the U.S. state of Utah
- Short Line, one of the four railroads in the American edition of the board game Monopoly
- Short Line (bus company), also known as ShortLine, a bus operator in the U.S. state of New York
- Short Line Bridge, a truss bridge that spans the Mississippi River in the U.S. state of Minnesota
- Short Line Railroad Trail, a trail in the U.S. state of Maryland
- Short Line Reading Series, a popular Vancouver literary event presented by Memewar Magazine
- Short Line Road, former name of the Ayd Mill Road in Saint Paul, Minnesota, US

== See also ==
- Shoreline (disambiguation)
