= Zhen-Creek & Southern Railroad =

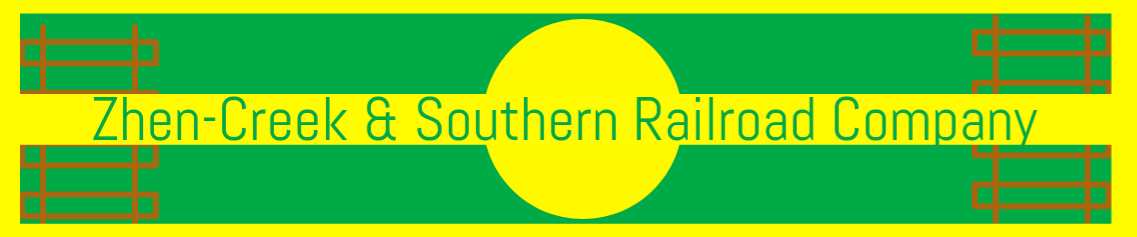
- This engine is ex-Hartwell Railroad, and exx-D&RGW, 3016, an EMD GP30 now owned by the ZC&S.

Overview
- Headquarters: Watkinsville, Georgia
- Reporting mark: ZC&S
- Locale: Watkinsville, Georgia; Bishop, Georgia
- Dates of operation: June 5, 2015; 9 years ago–present
- Predecessor: Hartwell Railroad; Norfolk Southern Railway; Southern Railway; Central of Georgia Railway
- Successor: None

Technical
- Track gauge: 4 ft 8 1/2 in (1,435 mm) standard gauge
- Previous gauge: 3ft 2.5in
- Electrification: None
- Length: 8 mi (13 km)

Other
- Website: None

Zhen-Creek & Southern Railroad (reporting mark ZC&S) dates to 2015 when the company was created by CEO Casey E. Michaux, and COO John F. Cooney. The new Company leases trackage between Watkinsville and Bishop in Oconee County, Georgia from the Hartwell Railroad Company on June 2, 2015. The Zhen-Creek & Southern is based in downtown Watkinsville, Georgia, at the former Southwire Cable Company warehouse. The ZC&S owns three engines:

- two EMD GP30's, numbers 3016 and 3021, two former Hartwell Railroad engines, also Ex-D&RGW engines.
- one EMD GP7, Number 6525, a former Hartwell Railroad engine, also an Ex-C&O engine.

== History ==
The line was initially constructed from Athens to Lula in 1876 by the North Eastern Railroad of Georgia, and was used by horseback trains on a 3 ft gauge. The Athens to Madison portion of the line was built in 1887 by the Covington and Macon Railroad. In May 1891 it became Macon and Northern Railway, and in 1895 consolidated into the Central of Georgia Railway. The Central was consolidated into the Southern Railway in 1963, and Southern was merged into Norfolk Southern Railway in 1982. In 2001, Norfolk Southern leased their Athens to Madison branch to the Athens Line Railroad.

Athens Line, LLC (reporting mark ABR) is a Class III shortline railroad operating in Georgia. Established in 2001, and initial use of the line in 2002. The ABR is operates under contract by the Great Walton Railroad. In 2015, the ABR leased their Watkinsville-Bishop portion of track, to the Zhen-Creek & Southern Railroad. This portion is still owned by the ZS&S.
