= Collins and Glennville Railroad =

Overview
- Dates of operation: 1921–1941
- Predecessor: Collins and Ludowici Railroad

Technical
- Track gauge: 1,435 mm (4 ft 8 1/2 in)
- Length: 23 miles (37 km)

The Collins and Glennville Railroad was a railway company in the United States. It was incorporated in 1921 to own and operate a 23-mile (37 km) line between Collins and Glennville, Georgia. The company ceased operation in 1941 and the line was abandoned.

== History ==
The earliest predecessor of the Collins and Glennville Railroad was the Collins and Reidsville Railroad, which completed a 7-mile (11 km) line between Collins and Reidsville, Georgia, in 1896. The Reidsville and Southeastern Railroad extended the line from Reidsville to Glennville, Georgia, in 1904–1905. Both railroads became part of the Georgia Coast and Piedmont Railroad. On that railroad's bankruptcy, the portion between Collins and Ludowici was sold to the Collins and Ludowici Railroad. The Collins and Glennville Railroad, incorporated on June 23, 1921, acquired the northern portion of that line.

The backers of the Collins and Glennville Railroad were drawn from the towns of Collins and Reidsville, desiring to preserve railroad service. The railroad itself was a marginal operation; in 1939 the sole engineer used hot water from the wood-burning locomotive for washing up. The company went bankrupt in 1941 and its line was abandoned.
