= Bowdon Junction, Georgia =

- Unincorporated community
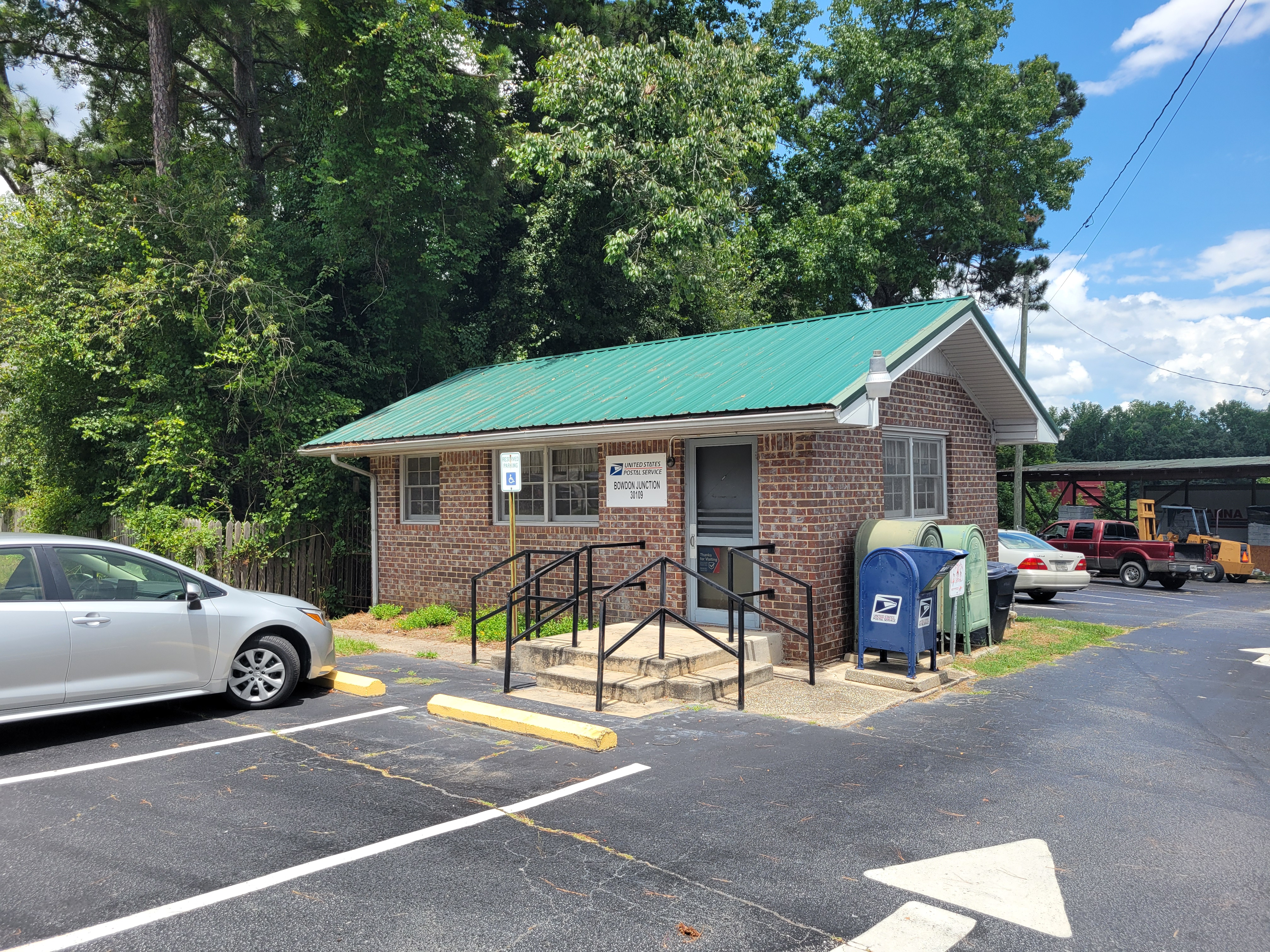
- Post Office

- Location within Georgia
- Coordinates: 33°39′47″N 85°08′49″W
- Country: United States
- State: Georgia
- County: Carroll
- Elevation: 1,243 ft (379 m)
- Time zone: UTC-5 (Eastern (EST))
  - Summer (DST): UTC-4 (EDT)
- ZIP code: 30109
- Area codes: 770, 678, 470
- GNIS feature ID: 331213

Bowdon Junction is an unincorporated community in Carroll County, Georgia, United States. The community is located along U.S. Route 27, 7 miles (11 km) northwest of Carrollton. Bowdon Junction has a post office with ZIP code 30109, which opened on April 29, 1911. Bowdon Junction was formerly the point where the Bowdon Railway diverged from the Central of Georgia Railway to reach Bowdon, Georgia.
