= SPTR =

SPTR may refer to:

- Savannah Port Terminal Railroad, in the US state of Georgia
- Silapathar railway station, in India
- South Park: Tenorman's Revenge, a video game
- South Pole TDRSS Relay, a telecommunication system at the Amundsen-Scott South Pole Station; see Amundsen–Scott South Pole Station: Operation
