= Ludowici =

Ludowici may refer to:

- Ludowici, Georgia, a town
- Ludowici Well Pavilion, a historic site
- Ludowici Roof Tile, an American company
- Collins and Ludowici Railroad, a defunct railroad
