= Central of Georgia Railway 509 =

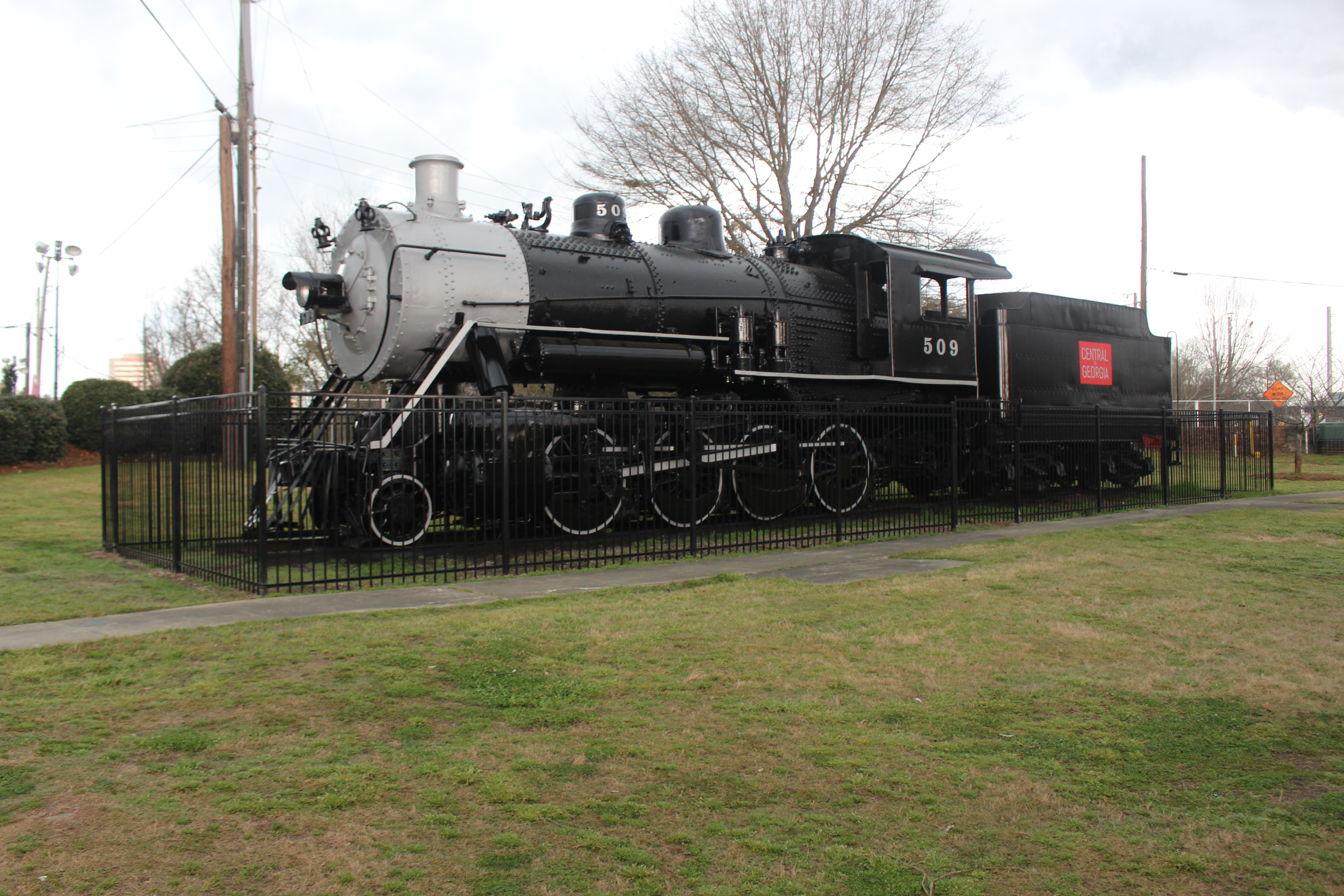
- The locomotive in 2022
Type and origin
- Power type: Steam Locomotive
- Builder: Baldwin Locomotive Works
- Serial number: 29660
- Build date: December 1906
Specifications
- Configuration
  - Whyte: 2-8-0
  - UIC: 1′D n2
- Gauge: 4 ft 8 1/2 in (1,435 mm)
- Driver dia.: 57 in (1.448 m)
- Adhesive weight: 160,000 lb (73,000 kg)
- Loco weight: 180,000 lb (82,000 kg)
- Total weight: 357,900 lb (162,300 kg)
- Firebox
  - Grate area: 53 sq ft (4.9 m^{2})
- Boiler pressure: 200 lbf/in^{2} (1.38 MPa)
- Heating surface
  - Firebox: 184 sq ft (17.1 m^{2})
  - Total surface: 3,515 sq ft (326.6 m^{2})
- Cylinder size: 22 in × 30 in (559 mm × 762 mm)
Performance figures
- Tractive effort: 44,078 lbf (196 kN)
- Factor of adh.: 3.88
Career
- Operators: Central of Georgia Railway
- Class: C-4
- Numbers: CG 1709 (1906–25); CG 509 (1925–date)
- Retired: 1953
- Current owner: City of Macon
- Disposition: Display

Central of Georgia Railway 509 is a 2-8-0 "Consolidation" tender steam locomotive on static display in downtown Macon, Georgia, United States. After being removed from service at the end of the steam era, it was given to the city of Macon.

== History ==
Central of Georgia Railway (CofG) 509 was built by the Baldwin Locomotive Works as one of 24 C-4 class locomotives for the railway in December 1906. This was the fourth generation in the C class series that was delivered to CofG. The locomotive was originally built under road number 1709 along with the other C-4 locomotives consisting of numbers from 1700 to 1724. It was then renumbered in 1925 to the current number of 509. CofG started to increase its numbers in more powerful steam locomotives and the C-4 class locomotives were then put to branch line use. While some of the C-4 locomotives were used for switching, the others were operating between Macon, Athens, Gordon, Milledgeville, Machen, and Porterdale.

As the use of steam engines declined and they were replaced with diesels, most of the C-4 locomotives were retired by September 1950 with the rest of the C-4 locomotives retired in next three years. 509 was selected as one of the few engines to be kept for preservation by CofG. A letter from November 12, 1953, stated that one 450-class engine, one 500-class engine, and one engine that is the smallest and oldest were to be kept. They would be placed in various places in Georgia; the 500 allocated to Macon, the 450 to Columbus, and the smallest to Savannah. The letter stated that the engines should be kept undercover to prevent deterioration.

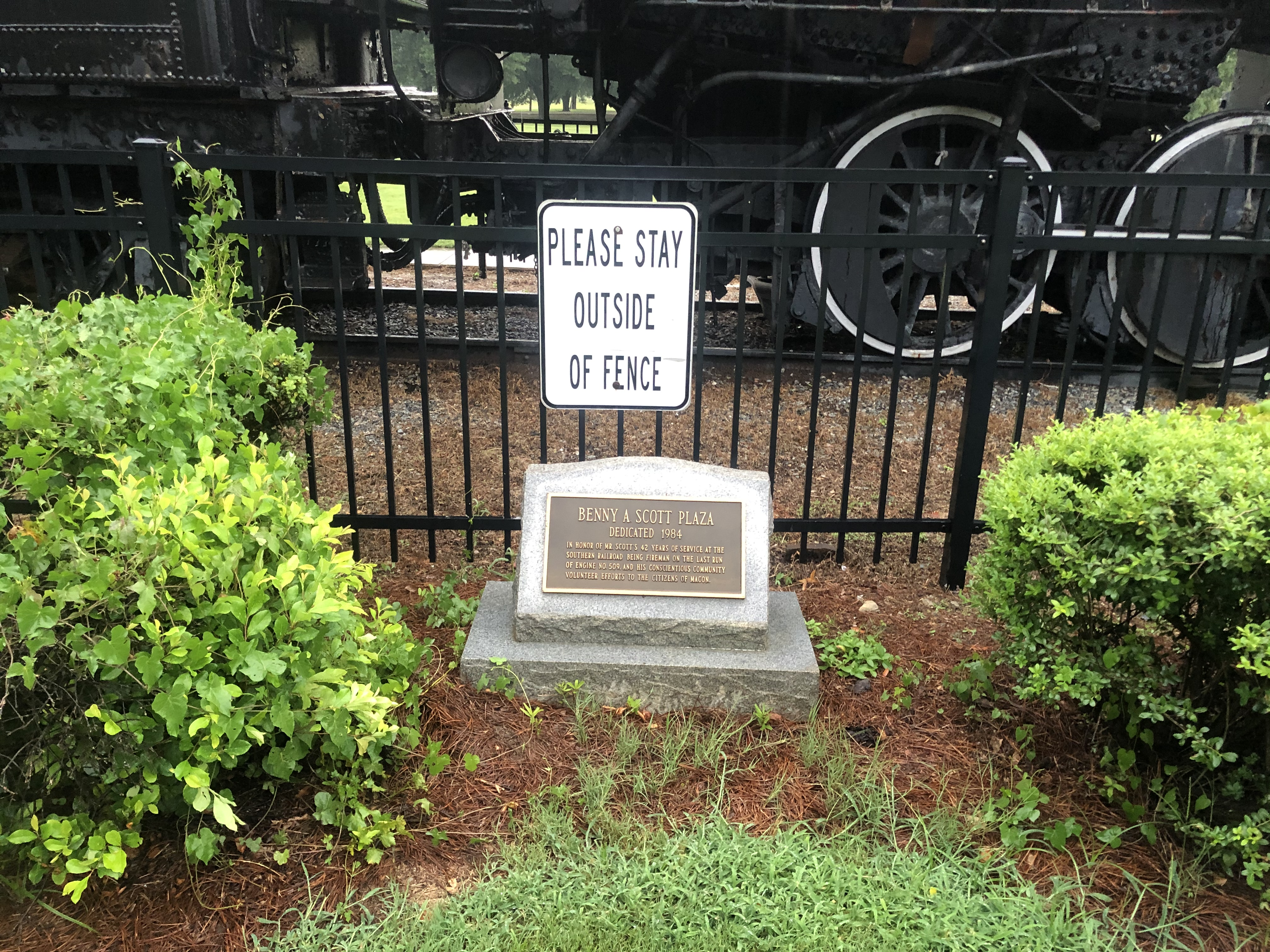
Benny A. Scott Plaque

In 1959, CofG decided they would transfer 509 to the city of Macon. Before being transferred, 509 received a brand new wooden cow-catcher, a fresh coat of paint, and new stencils. In order to move the locomotive to the display area, which did not have direct rail access, temporary track was laid and part of brick wall was removed. On October 16, 1959, the locomotive was officially handed over to the City of Macon. Since then it has been sitting in Central City Park as a display along with other railroad monuments. Most of the other railroad monuments are no longer standing. One of the only ones left that are still standing today are locomotive 509 and an old CofG coaling tower.

Outside the display is a plaque in memory of Benny A. Scott. He was the locomotive's fireman for the last run of 509, and was also the railroad's first black fireman. Over the years, 509 has stayed in its place with little action. It was repainted in 1999 for a project on a children's television network, and decorated with what looked to be Christmas lights. The Right Way published an article in 2011 about 509 and discussed the complete restoration of the locomotive to fully operational condition by Hartwell Railroad Company in Bowersville, Georgia. The cost of the restoration was estimated to be around $450,000. The locomotive would then run excursions runs.
