= Bainbridge Northeastern Railway =

The Bainbridge Northeastern Railway was a railway company in southern Georgia that ran 18 miles (29 km) between Swindell Landing and Mount Royal, USA, starting in 1908. It lasted only two years before it was abandoned.

== History ==
The railroad company was chartered on September 7, 1907, and incorporated on September 14, 1907, in Atlanta with a capital stock of $200,000 to build a 70-mile-long (110 km) line from Bainbridge, Georgia, across the Florida panhandle to the Gulf of Mexico. One of the main incorporators, E. Swindell, also owned a logging railroad called the Georgia Eastern Railway, that was intended to be purchased by Bainbridge Northeastern.

The Bainbridge Northeastern entered receivership in May 1908 because the company was, as its receiver put it, "... so intimately connected with the affairs of E. Swindell & Co." although the ownership of the railroad's infrastructure was still unclear. The appointed receiver was J.M. Wilkinson, who was third vice president of the Georgia and Florida Railway.

The line was built out to about 15 miles (24 km) by 1910.
