= Chattanooga, Rome and Southern Railroad =

Historical Georgia and Tennessee railroad

The Chattanooga, Rome and Southern Railroad was formed out of a reorganization of the Chattanooga, Rome and Columbus Railroad in 1897 and three years later, it purchased the Chattanooga and Durham Railroad. On 16 May 1901 the CR&S was purchased by the Central of Georgia Railway.
