= Collins and Ludowici Railroad =

American railroad

The Collins and Ludowici Railroad was a railroad that operated in the U.S. state of Georgia in the early 20th century.

In 1915, the Georgia Coast and Piedmont Railroad entered receivership and was subsequently broken up. Part of this railroad became the Collins and Ludowici Railroad in 1919. Originally, the line ran through Collins, Glennville, Darien and Brunswick, Georgia. By 1921, the line was reduced to running 23 miles (37 km) between Collins and Glennville and was then renamed the Collins and Glennville Railroad.
