= Dover and Statesboro Railroad =

Former railroad i Georgia, USA

Coordinates: 32°27′25.0″N 81°46′45.6″W

The Dover and Statesboro Railroad was founded in 1889 and began operations between Statesboro, GA and Dover, GA. It was acquired by the Central of Georgia Railway in 1901.
