= Augusta and Summerville Railroad =

The Augusta and Summerville Railroad (reporting mark AUS) is a railroad in Georgia, United States.

It was chartered in 1866 and operated until 1888 using horses to pull rail cars over a 7-mile route. Eventually the horses were retired and the A&S ended up operating a 3-mile railroad to provide connections between other railroads.

Between 1897 and 1900, the A&S was sold jointly to the Southern Railway, the Central of Georgia Railway, the Charleston and Western Carolina Railway and the Georgia Railroad.

The A&S is currently operated as a switching line jointly owned by CSX Transportation and the Norfolk Southern Railway.
