= Augusta and Florida Railway =

Former American railroad company

Overview
- Locale: Georgia, USA
- Dates of operation: 1904 (chartered)–
- Successor: Georgia and Florida Railway

Technical
- Length: 29.9 mi (48.1 km)

The Augusta and Florida Railway (A&F) was incorporated in 1904 and operated a line between Keysville and Midville, Georgia, USA. The railway company was chartered on November 16, 1904, with an initial capital stock of $1 million to build about 60 miles (97 km) of line from Augusta to Midville. Construction began soon after incorporation with 16 miles (26 km) of track completed by December 1904. The A&F was sold in pieces to the Georgia and Florida Railway in 1907 and 1910. Several lines in and around Augusta made connections to the line in 1907 in association with the Georgia & Florida purchase.
