= Louisville and Wadley Railway =

The Louisville and Wadley Railway was chartered on August 24, 1872 to serve as a 10-mile feeder line into the Central of Georgia, its parent company, in Jefferson County, Georgia.

== History ==
The railroad was purchased on December 7, 1898 by the Central of Georgia Railway. It was sold by them on September 17, 1961 to a group of private citizens.

== Today ==
Today, the L&W appears to be abandoned. It is rumored that the line is still being used for car storage. One thing of note is that the line leases boxcars and gondola cars. Currently, there is a Southern SW1 sitting there, and it is rumored that it is still used on occasion to move the above mentioned boxcars. The railroad is listed as a reporting mark railroad. It owns several thousand railcars with the reporting mark LW.

The engine is kept in running condition but the city has paved over all the tracks leading to it, leaving it landlocked.
