= Chattanooga and Durham Railroad =

Railroad in Georgia, United States

The Chattanooga and Durham Railroad was established in 1897 from the failed attempt of a railroad that stretched from Durham, Georgia, to Chickamauga, Georgia, United States. The 17-mile railway was used to haul coal from Lookout Mountain in 1894. The railway was built atop a range of hills and ran from the foot of Lookout Mountain to the top. The Chattanooga and Durham was foreclosed in 1900 and changed to the Chattanooga, Rome and Southern Railroad. The Central of Georgia bought the railroad the next year and ran it for another fifty years before it became vacant in 1950.

== History ==
The Chattanooga and Durham Railroad Company originated as the Chattanooga and Gulf Railroad Company in 1889. On Sept 1, 1891, Chickamauga and Durham Railroad bought out this railroad. James W. English, owner of Durham Coal and Coke Company that provided the coal, was the president of the railway from 1892-1900. The Chattanooga and Durham Railroad was finally established in 1897.

== Geography ==
The end of the Chattanooga and Durham Railroad extended to a curved road from Wallaceville to Chickamauga. A portion of the rail bed is covered by a local ballpark near Chickamauga. A chain link fence was constructed across the rail bed near the Wallaceville School. The line starts to gain distance from the Chickamauga Road after entering a gap among the hills. The Chattanooga and Durham Railroad continue to stretch to Mill Wee Hollow Road, GA. Other locations passed in its route include Eagle Cliff located near Lula Lake, and then to Rock Creek.

== Labor ==
The workforce responsible for the development of the railroad consisted primarily of convicts who used basic tools and were provided by the state. The mines were worked by primarily convicts as well. The workers would dig coal and then place the coal into donkey-driven carts led to Rock Creek. The construction was completed in 1892.
