= Bowdon Railway =

Railway in Georgia

Overview
- Dates of operation: 1910–1963

Technical
- Track gauge: 1,435 mm (4 ft 8 1/2 in)
- Length: 12 miles (19 km)

The Bowdon Railway was a shortline railroad in the United States. It was incorporated in 1910 and opened a 12-mile (19 km) line between Bowdon, Georgia, and a connection with the Central of Georgia Railway at Bowdon Junction, Georgia, in 1911. The company ceased operations in 1963 and the line was abandoned.

== History ==
The Bowdon Railway was incorporated on April 9, 1910, to construct a railway line from Bowdon, Georgia, northeast to a junction with the Central of Georgia Railway. Its backers were all from Bowdon; J. L. Lovvorn served as president. The line was completed for operation on January 25, 1911. Prior to completion, the company hosted "an all-day barbecue and free rides on Thanksgiving Day, 1910."

The company entered receivership in 1944 and was reorganized as the Bowdon Railroad and Transportation Company by W. C. Roop, another local businessman. The company reverted to the original name in 1953. Never a major success, the reorganized company began losing money in 1958. The last train ran on July 30, 1963. Roop blamed competition from trucks and a lack of demand for rail service.
