= Macon and Western Railroad =

The Macon and Western Railroad was an American railway company that operated in Georgia in the middle of the 19th century. Originally chartered as the Monroe Railroad and Banking Company in December 1833, it was not until 1838 that it opened for business with a 5 ft (1,524 mm) gauge line from Macon, Georgia Northwest to Forsyth. It was extended to Griffin in 1842. An economic depression halted building, but when the railroad started building again, it managed only another 11.25 miles (18.11 km) towards Atlanta for a total of 81 miles (130 km) before falling into bankruptcy.

It was bought in foreclosure and the name was changed to the Macon and Western Railroad in 1845. This new railroad completed the line into Atlanta in 1846 by adding 21 more miles (34 km) for a grand total of 102 miles (164 km). Portions of this railroad were destroyed during Sherman's March to the Sea. After the Civil War, this railroad was purchased by the Central Railroad and Banking Company of Georgia in 1872.

The stops available to riders in 1867 were:

== Distances of depots from Atlanta ==
#	Name	Miles	Kilometers	Notes
1	East Point, Georgia	7	11
2	Rough and Ready, Georgia	13	21	Now called Mountain View, Georgia
3	Forest Park, Georgia	15	24
4	Morrow's Station, Georgia	19	31	Old Name Morrow, Georgia
5	Jonesborough, Georgia	23	37	Shortened to Jonesboro
6	Lovejoy Station, Georgia	29	47	Old Name. Now just Lovejoy, Georgia
7	Bear Creek, Georgia	34	55	Now called Hampton, Georgia
8	Fayette, Georgia	38	61	Now called Sunny Side
9	Griffin, Georgia	44	71
10	Thornton, Georgia	50	80	Now called Orchard Hill
11	Milner, Georgia	56	90
12	Barnesville, Georgia	62	100
13	Goggins, Georgia	67	108
14	Collins, Georgia	72	116
15	Forsyth, Georgia	78	126
16	Smarr, Georgia	83	134
17	Bolingbroke, Georgia	89	143
18	Lorane, Georgia	94	151
19	Macon, Georgia	102	164

Trains departed from Atlanta at 7:15AM and 8:15PM and arrived there at 2:00PM and 4:35PM.
