= Georgia Florida and Alabama Railroad =

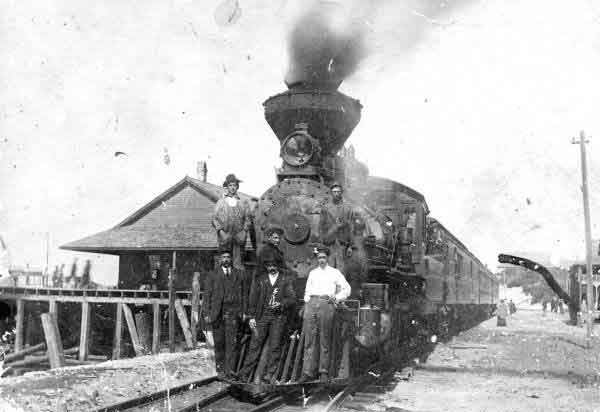
- A Georgia, Florida and Alabama Railroad train at Carrabelle, 1906

Overview
- Headquarters: Arlington, Georgia
- Reporting mark: GF&A
- Locale: Southwest Georgia, Northwest Florida
- Dates of operation: 1895–1944

Technical
- Track gauge: 1,435 mm (4 ft 8 1/2 in) (standard gauge)
- Length: 180 miles (290 km)

The Georgia, Florida and Alabama Railroad (Note: Sources differ on the use of Railroad vs Railway in the official name of the company.) (the GF&A; known as the Sumatra Leaf Route and colloquially the Gopher, Frog and Alligator) was a 180-mile (290 km)-long railroad from Richland, Georgia to Carrabelle, Florida. It was founded in 1895 as a logging railroad, the Georgia Pine Railway. Despite the name, the GF&A never had any trackage in Alabama.

The northern and southern ends of the railroad have been abandoned, but the section from Cuthbert, Georgia, to Tallahassee, Florida, remains in use by various railroads.

== Route description ==
The northern terminus of the line was at Richland, where it met the Savannah, Americus and Montgomery Railway and the Columbus Southern Railway. It ran almost due south through Cuthbert and Edison to reach Arlington, where it crossed the Central of Georgia Railway. It continued through Colquitt and Bainbridge before crossing the Flint river and entering Florida. It continued through Tallahassee to Sopchoppy and its southern terminus in Carrabelle on the Florida Gulf Coast.

== History ==
=== Construction and early years ===
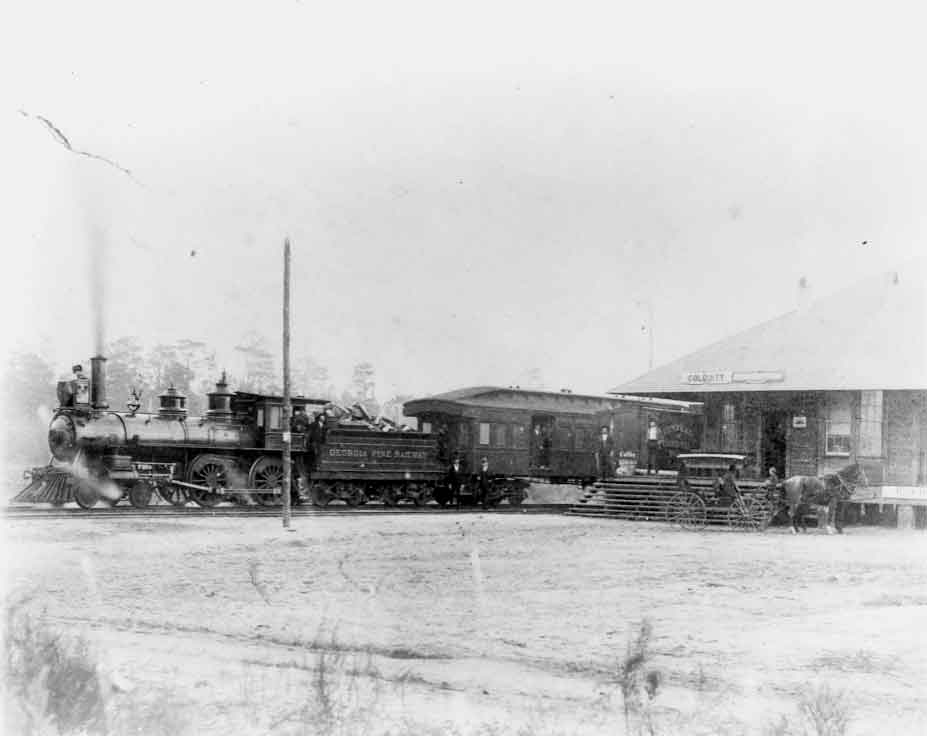
Georgia Pine Railway locomotive #3 at Coquitt, Georgia before 1898

Hannibal Kimball promoted the Bainbridge, Cuthbert and Columbus Railroad to run north-to-south through southwest Georgia in 1869. Although work began on construction in 1870, it was never completed, and in 1872 the project was abandoned amidst financial problems and bond endorsement issues that stirred allegations of impropriety against Kimball. During the 1880s, attempts were made to revive the railroad, with some activity taking place in the middle of that decade, but this too came to nothing.

Finally, in 1895 local entrepreneur J. D. Williams laid rails on part of the route creating the Georgia Pine Railroad connecting Bainbridge to Arlington. The railroad had only been intended for logging, but since it provided an additional rail route from Georgia into Florida and connected with other railroads, traffic increased. By 1898, the railroad was renamed the Georgia Florida and Alabama Railroad and by 1901, it had been extended north to Richland. In 1902, the GF&A completed the section from Tallahassee to Bainbridge.

=== Tallahassee to Carrabelle ===
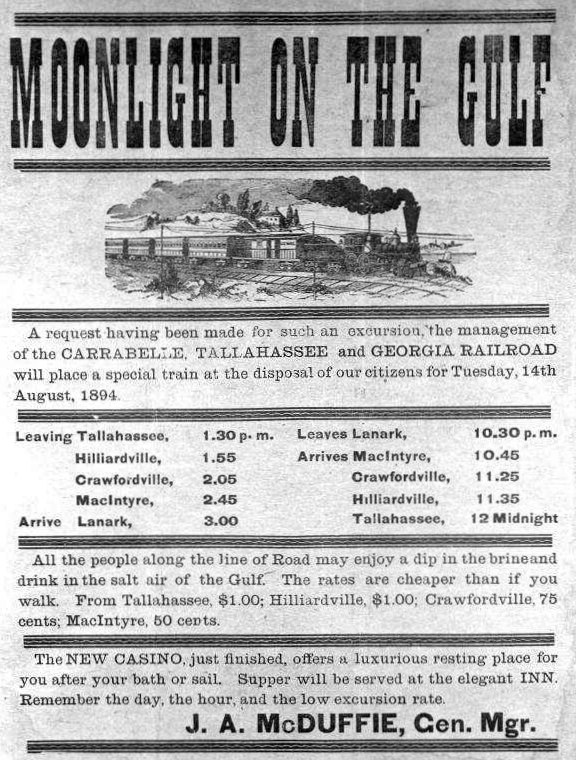
Poster advertising C.T.& G. Railroad, 1894

In 1906, the Georgia Florida and Alabama Railway purchased the Carrabelle, Tallahassee & Georgia Railroad (CT&G), which ran from Tallahassee south to Carrabelle on the Gulf of Mexico. The CT&G from Carrabelle north was first chartered as the Thomasville, Tallahassee and Gulf Railroad in 1883. Construction began from Carrabelle to the Sopchoppy River, but it stopped there since the company could not obtain funding to build a bridge over the river.

The line was reorganized as the Augusta, Tallahassee and Gulf Railroad in 1889. It was then purchased by William Clark who owned 175,000 acres of pine lands near the railroad. Clark reincorporated the line as the Carrabelle, Tallahassee & Georgia Railroad on January 5, 1891. Construction was complete to Tallahassee by October 1893.

CT&G also had stops at Hilliardville, Arran (west of Crawfordville), MacIntyre, and Lanark (site of an elegant casino/hotel). From Carrabelle, the paddle steamer Crescent City, owned by the CT&G, made daily round trips to Apalachicola, to which there was no road or rail access at the time.

Once the Georgia Florida and Alabama Railroad acquired the CT&G, the GF&A reached its greatest extent from Richland, Georgia to Carrabelle, Florida, a distance of 180 miles.

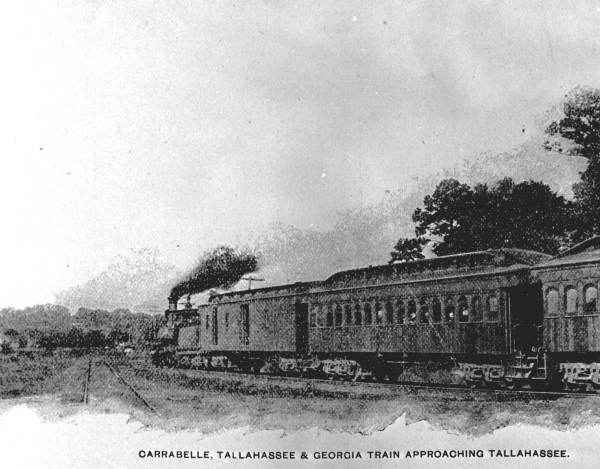
CT&G train approaching Tallahassee in 1895

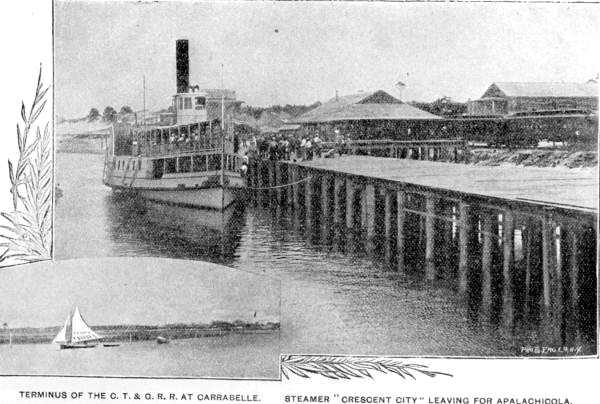
Steamer Crescent City at terminus in Carrabelle in 1895

Terminus at Carrabelle in 1898

=== Later years ===
The GF&A was leased to the Seaboard Air Line Railway in 1927. The Seaboard went into receivership at the end of 1930, and the lease was revoked in 1931. The Seaboard was reformed after receiving government loans, and it agreed to operate, but not lease the GF&A. In 1944, the court that was overseeing the Seaboard's receivership authorized the company to purchase 90% of the GF&A's bonds. Once under Seaboard ownership, they designated the line north of Bainbridge as their Richland Subdivision and south of there as the Bainbridge Subdivision.

In 1948, the line was abandoned from Carrabelle to Tallahassee.

The Seaboard Air Line became part of CSX Transportation by 1980. In 1983, the former GF&A line north of Bainbridge was sold off to the South Carolina Central Railroad, and in 1989 it became part of the Georgia Southwestern Railroad. In 1997, the portion of the GF&A route from Richland south to Cuthbert was abandoned, and in 2002 the Georgia Department of Transportation acquired the remaining Cuthbert to Bainbridge section. The Georgia Southwestern remains the operator of the line.

== Current conditions ==
=== North of Bainbridge ===
The segment from Cuthbert to Bainbridge is now owned by the Georgia Department of Transportation and operated by the Georgia Southwestern Railroad.

=== Bainbridge Subdivision ===
The segment from Bainbridge to Tallahassee is still in service. This segment is still known as the Bainbridge Subdivision and it is operated by CSX from Bainbridge to Attapulgus. CSX sold the remaining segment from Attapulgus to Tallahassee to the Florida Gulf & Atlantic Railroad in 2019.

Currently, the line's milepost numbers begin in Tallahassee at 52 and increase from there. This is due to the fact that the numbering still reflects the line's full length to Carrabelle, which was mile 0 before the track between there and Tallahassee was abandoned.

=== South of Tallahassee ===
A 2.4-mile part of the abandoned Tallahassee-Carrabelle segment of the GF&A is now the Tallahassee-Georgia Florida and Alabama (GF&A) Trail in the Apalachicola National Forest. Research work on the rail-to-trail project was done by Genesis Group.

== Historic stations ==
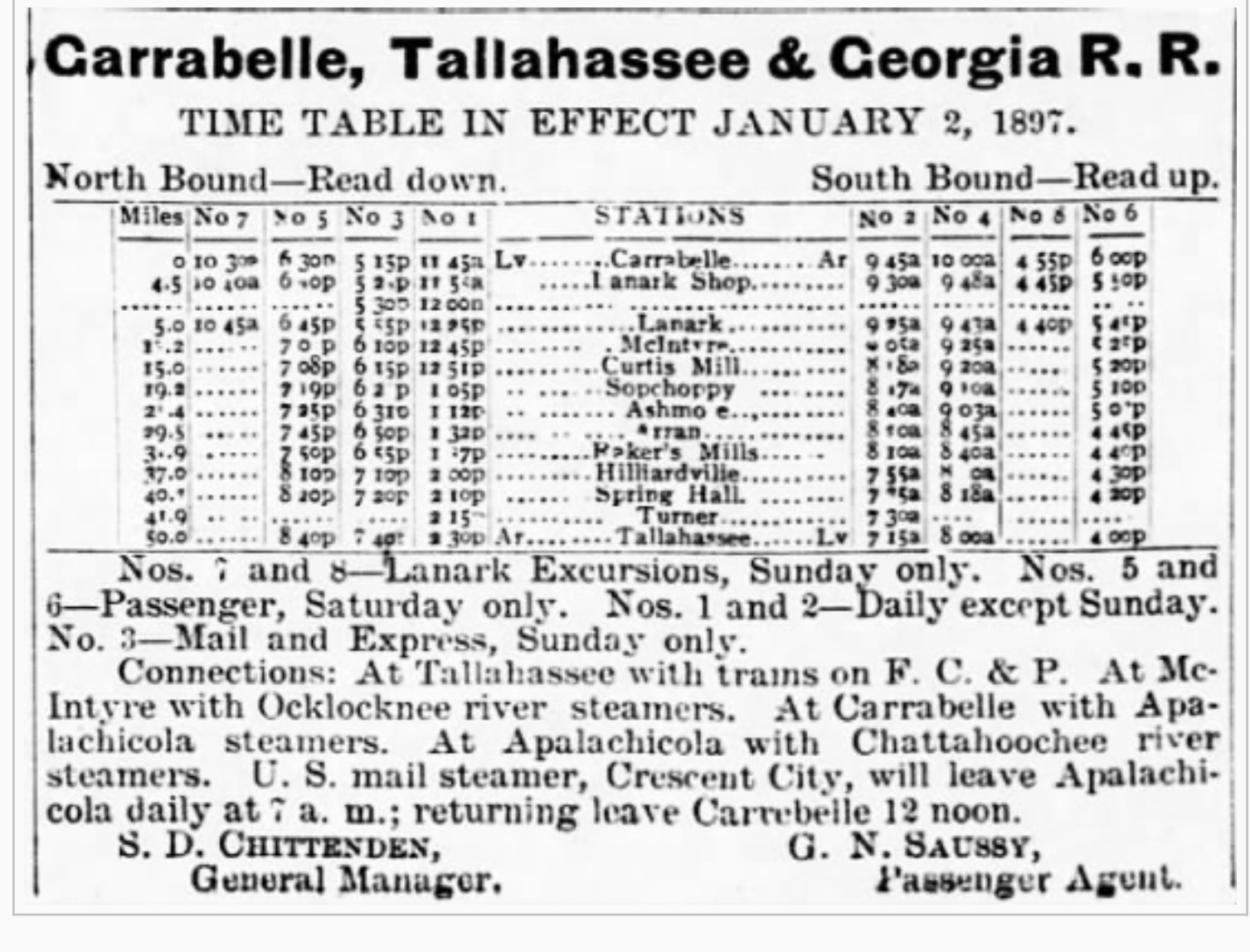
Timetable of Carrabelle, Tallahassee & Georgia R.R, 1897

State	Milepost	City/Location	Station	Connections and notes
FL	SLC 0.0	Carrabelle	Carrabelle	
FL	SLC 5.0	Lanark	Lanark	
FL	SLC 13.5		McIntyre	
FL	SLC 15.0		Curtis Mill	
FL	SLC 19.2	Sopchoppy	Sopchoppy	
FL	SLC 21.4		Ashmore	
FL	SLC 29.5		Arran	
FL	SLC 30.9		Raker's Mill	
FL	SLC 37.0	Hilliardville	Hilliardville	
FL	SLC 40.1		Spring Hall	
FL	SLC 41.9		Turner	
FL	SLC 50.0	Tallahassee	Tallahassee	junction with Florida Central and Western Railroad (FC&P/SAL)
FL	SLC 58.5	Lake Jackson	Lake Jackson	
FL	SLC 66.6	Havana	Havana	
FL	SLC 68.3	Hinson	Hinson	
FL	SLC 70.9		Jamieson	
GA	SLC 77.8	Attapulgus	Attapulgus	
GA	SLC 82.3		Jamieson	
GA	SLC 90.3	Bainbridge	Bainbridge	junction with Savannah, Florida and Western Railway (ACL)
GA	SLC 96.2		Lynn	
GA	SLC 101.0	Eldorendo	Eldorendo	
GA	SLC 105.7	Babcock	Babcock	
GA	SLC 110.9	Colquitt	Colquitt	
GA	SLC 114.9		Corea	
GA	SLC 119.7	Damascus	Damascus	
GA	SLC 125.4	Rowena	Rowena	
GA	SLC 129.5	Arlington	Arlington	junction with Central of Georgia Railway
GA	SLC 139.2	Edison	Edison	
GA	SLC 145.4	Carnegie	Carnegie	
GA	SLC 154.7	Cuthbert	Cuthbert	
GA	SLC 163.7	Benevolence	Benevolence	
GA	SLC 168.5		Troutman	
GA	SLC 174.6		Kimbrough	junction with Columbus Southern Railway (SAL)
GA	SLC 181.0	Richland	Richland	junction with: Savannah, Americus and Montgomery Railway (SAL); Columbus Southern Railway (SAL)
