= Savannah and Western Railroad =

Historic railroad in Georgia, U.S.

The Savannah and Western Railroad is a historic railroad that was located in Georgia.

The S&W was incorporated in 1885, and acquired property in 1888 through a consolidation of seven different railroads owned by the Central Railroad and Banking Company of Georgia. These included:

- Buena Vista and Ellaville Railroad
- Columbus and Rome Railway
- Columbus and Western Railway
- East Alabama Railway
- Eufaula and Clayton Railway
- Eufaula and East Alabama Railway
- Savannah and Columbus Railway

Following the consolidation, the S&W operated about 400 miles of track between Americus and Birmingham while passing through Columbus.

In 1890–91, the railroad built 57 miles of track between Meldrim and Lyons and purchased the Chattanooga, Rome and Columbus Railroad, Savannah, Dublin and Western Short Line Railway, and Savannah, Griffin and North Alabama Railroad. In 1894, the S&W ran into financial trouble and the CR&C was split off and returned to its original owners. The remaining part of the S&W was then taken over by the newly reorganized Central of Georgia Railway in 1895.
