= Douglas and McDonald Railroad =

The Douglas and McDonald Railroad was a 15-mile (24 km) industrial railway line from Douglas to McDonald (now Axson), Georgia, USA. Built in 1895–96, it was a spur of the Brunswick and Western Railroad. The line was abandoned in 1904.
