= Georgia Coast and Piedmont Railroad =

Railroad in Georgia, USA

In 1906 the Collins and Reidsville Railroad, the Reidsville and Southeastern Railroad and the Darien and Western Railroad merged to form the Georgia Coast and Piedmont Railroad. The railroad operated mainly on a line between Collins and Darien, Georgia, USA, extending to Brunswick in 1914. In 1915, the railroad went bankrupt with bondholders filing a request for receivership in 1916. In 1919, after a bid by New York-based salvage firm of Gordon & Freedman, a portion of the railroad was sold to become the Collins and Glennville Railroad.
