= Blakely Southern Railroad =

The Blakely and Southern Railroad, also known as the Flowers Lumber Company, is a defunct railroad that operated in the U.S. state of Georgia. It had one of the briefest existences of any railroad line that actually operated track.

== History ==
The railroad's history began in 1906 when two logging lines were joined together. One line ran south from Blakely to the Flowers Brothers Lumber sawmill, and the other ran north from Jakin to Flowers Lumber Company sawmill. Both railroads and both sawmills were owned by the same company.

In 1911, the Blakeley Southern Railroad (BLKS) was incorporated for the purpose of purchasing the railroad. The railroad was then converted to a common carrier line. The new owner spent between $15,000 and $20,000 improving the and straitening the line. The railroad purchased one single locomotive with one passenger car and one baggage/freight car for use on the railroad. Logs and lumber were its primary type of freight.

The 22-mile long railroad began operations on March 1, 1912. After the railroad entered receivership, its charter was annulled on September 21, 1914. The railroad was abandoned later that year.
