= Upson County Railroad =

Overview
- Locale: Georgia
- Dates of operation: 1856–1914
- Predecessor: Thomaston and Barnesville Railroad
- Successor: Central of Georgia Railway Company

Technical
- Track gauge: 4 ft 8 1/2 in (1,435 mm)
- Previous gauge: 5 ft (1,524 mm); American Civil War era and converted to 4 ft 9 in (1,448 mm) in 1886

Upson County Railroad Company was the successor by change of name to the Thomaston and Barnesville Railroad Company. Thomaston and Barnesville Railroad Company was incorporated on December 23, 1839 by special act of the Georgia General Assembly.

In 1856, Thomaston and Barnesville Railroad Company constructed 16.5 miles (26.6 km) of 5 ft (1,524 mm) gauge railroad line between Thomaston, Georgia and Barnesville, Georgia.

On December 6, 1860, Upson County Railroad was incorporated by special act of the Georgia General Assembly, which amended the charter and changed the name of the company from Thomaston and Barnesville Railroad Company.

In 1869, the Central Railroad and Banking Company of Georgia acquired control of the Upson County Railroad through ownership of a majority of the capital stock.

The Upson County Railroad was destroyed during the American Civil War and was rebuilt in 1870. The company's property was operated by Central Railroad and Banking Company of Georgia from that year forward.

Upson County Railroad was sold to Central of Georgia Railway Company on February 2, 1914.

== See also ==
- Confederate railroads in the American Civil War
