= Midville, Swainsboro and Red Bluff Railroad =

The Midville, Swainsboro and Red Bluff Railroad was chartered in 1888. It began operations on a line between Midville and Swainsboro, Georgia, U.S., sometime before 1890. It apparently never reached Red Bluff and was noted on some documents as the Midville and Swainsboro Railroad. Locally it was referred to informally as "Jesse Thompson's Road".

The railroad became the Atlantic and Gulf Short Line Railroad in 1900, which went into receivership in 1903 after failing to complete an extension from Augusta, Georgia, to St. Andrews Bay, Florida. It was eventually sold to the Georgia and Florida Railway in 1907.
