= Roswell Railroad =

Overview
- Locale: Roswell, Georgia
- Dates of operation: September 1, 1881–1921

Technical
- Track gauge: 3 ft (914 mm)

The Roswell Railroad was a 3 ft (914 mm) narrow gauge railroad that ran from south of Roswell, Georgia to Chamblee from 1881 until 1921, after which the tracks were removed. The railroad served as a passenger and freight carrier.

== Overview ==
Some accounts say the railroad had only a single combination passenger coach and baggage car, two box cars and four flat cars.

Since Roswell was a textile manufacturing town, the line would have brought in cotton and dry goods and shipped textile and farming products.

The Roswell terminus was located south of the Chattahoochee River near Roberts Drive and connected to the Atlanta and Charlotte Air Line Railway at its Chamblee terminus. At the South Roswell terminus, a bridge was planned, but never built. About 1/2 mile upstream, an old wagon road ran just west of the current River Landing Drive and Grimes Bridge Landing to connect to current day Grimes Bridge and Oxbo Roads and approached the textile mills from the north. Unfortunately, much of the old roadbed was destroyed when Fulton County installed a sewer line.

Ike Roberts was an employee of Southern Railway at the time the company decided to create the Roswell Railroad. Roberts participated in the grading and track laying for this new line. He also purchased 650 acres (2.6305 km^{2}) of land at the northern terminus, built a train station, and leased it to Southern. After completion of the line, he stayed on as the engineer and was the only person that worked in that capacity until the closing of the line. His home still remains on Roberts Drive (his namesake in the Sandy Springs community).

As there was no facility to turn around in (South) Roswell, the engine traveled in reverse on the return trip to Chamblee.

== Absorption ==
The Roswell Railroad operated as an independent road until, in 1894, it was absorbed into the newly created Southern Railway. They had one narrow gauge steam locomotive numbered 815, an 0-6-0-arranged Baldwin 1878 steamer named "Buck" (builder construction number 4321). In 1894, Buck was renumbered N815 in the Southern numbering system. In 1905, the line was converted to 4 ft 8 1/2 in (1,435 mm) standard gauge and Buck was sold to the S.I.&E. Co. In 1902, the Bull Sluice Railroad built a 2.7-mile (4.3 km) line from a junction with the Roswell Branch, just north of Dunwoody, to the Georgia Railway and Power Company's construction site for its hydroelectric Morgan Falls Dam (built to supply electricity to Atlanta's streetcar system, and creating Bull Sluice Lake). The line was built to bring in building materials. Later the Southern purchased this line and it became the Morgan Falls Branch. The Bull Sluice used a steamer named "Dinkey".
