= Atlanta and Florida Railway =

Railway in Georgia

In July 1886, the Atlanta and Florida Railway was chartered as the Atlanta and Hawkinsville Railroad to connect Atlanta, Georgia, and Hawkinsville, Georgia. The Atlanta and Florida Railroad name was instituted in 1887, and in November 1888, the railroad reached Fort Valley, 105 miles from Atlanta; however, it never reached Hawkinsville.

The company was reorganized as the Atlanta and Florida Railway in 1893 while Colonel Ira Yale Sage was its president, and the property was sold to the Southern Railway in 1895.
