= Darien and Western Railroad =

In 1894 the Darien and Western Railroad was established to take over operations of the Darien Short Line which had gone bankrupt. The D and W operated a 32-mile (51 km) line between Darien and Midway, Georgia, US. In 1895 after six years of construction, the line reached its terminus near where the Vernon Square–Columbus Square Historic District is found today. By 1904, the line had reached as far as Ludowici, Georgia. It became part of a multi-railroad merger in 1906 that resulted in the Georgia Coast and Piedmont Railroad.

Today, the Darien and Western Railroad is commemorated with a historical marker in Darien's Columbus Square, where the original passenger depot was built.
