= Georgia Woodlands Railroad =

American railroad in Georgia (state)

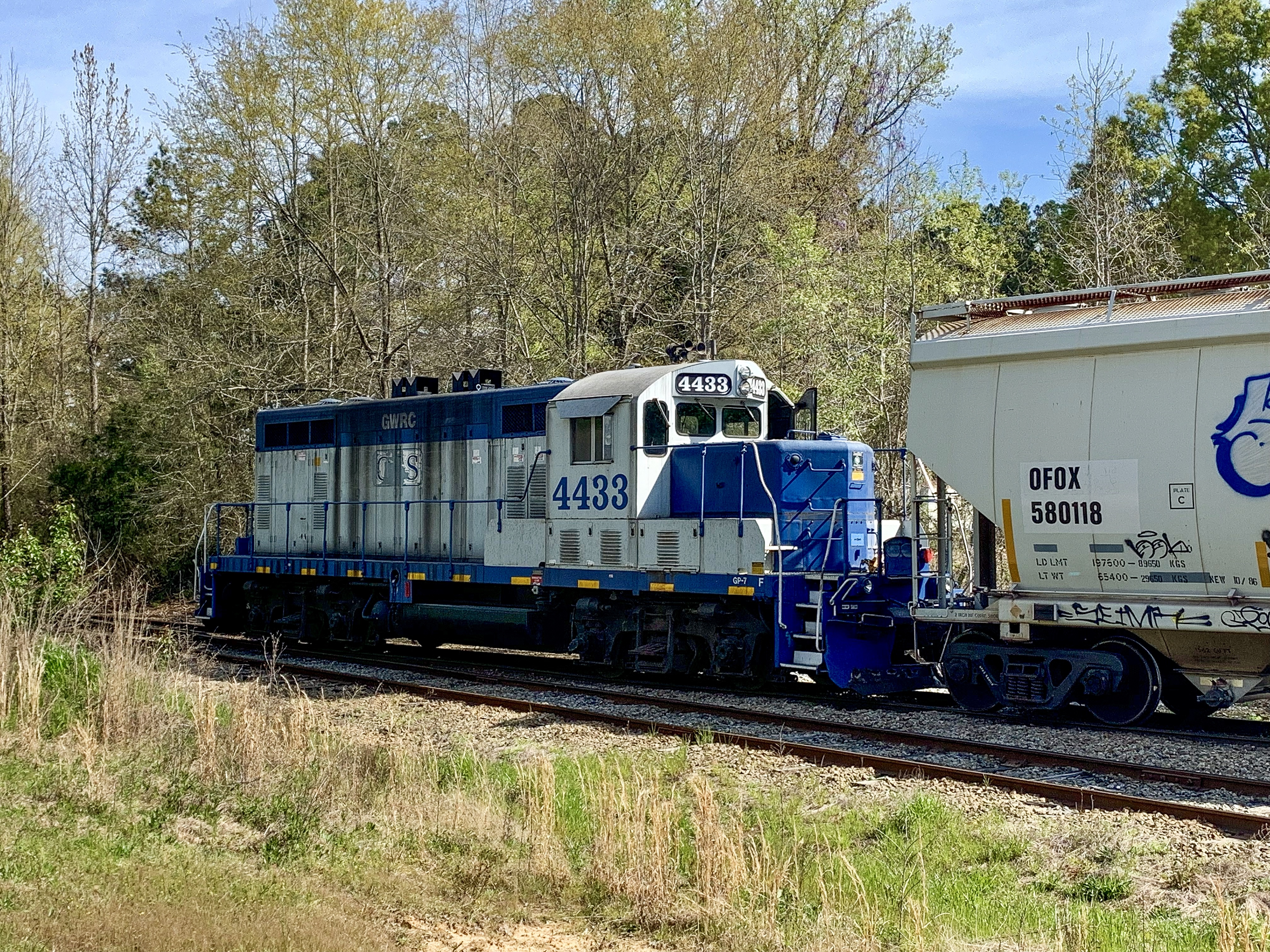
- GP7 #4433 in Washington, Georgia, in 2019

Overview
- Headquarters: Washington, Georgia
- Reporting mark: GWRC
- Locale: Northeast Georgia
- Dates of operation: 1988–
- Predecessor: Georgia Eastern Railroad

Technical
- Track gauge: 4 ft 8 1/2 in (1,435 mm) (standard gauge)
- Length: 17.3 miles (27.8 km)

Other
- Website: omnitrax.com

The Georgia Woodlands Railroad (reporting mark GWRC) operates 17.3 miles (27.8 km) of track between Washington, Georgia, and Barnett, Georgia. Originally a subsidiary of the Chicago West Pullman Transportation Corporation, it was acquired by OmniTRAX in 1992.

Primary commodities include woodchips, lumber products, butane, and plastics, generating 570 annual carloads. The railroad interchanges with CSX Transportation at Barnett.

== History ==
Originally completed by the Georgia Railroad as the Washington branch in 1852, the railroad remained in control of the Georgia until its merger with the Seaboard System in 1983. CSX gained control of the Seaboard System in 1986.

CSX sold the line to the Georgia Eastern Railroad in February 1987. The railroad lasted just over a year before becoming the Georgia Woodlands Railroad on June 7, 1988. Upon its start, traffic included pulpwood, woodchips, plastic, lumber, fertilizer, and others, generating 2,500 annual carloads.

The railroad became part of OmniTRAX in 1992.
