= Americus and Atlantic Railroad =

The Americus and Atlantic Railroad was founded in 1917 and operated from Mata to Methvins, Georgia. It provided only freight service through a connection with the Atlanta, Birmingham and Atlantic Railroad and was eventually abandoned in 1926.
