= Macon and Northern Railway =

In 1891, the Macon and Northern Railroad was established and took over the failed Covington and Macon Railroad. It operated 105 miles (169 km) of track between Macon and Athens, Georgia, USA. The M&N Railroad went bankrupt in 1894 and was then reorganized as the Macon and Northern Railway, which was then purchased by the Central of Georgia Railroad in 1895.
