= Darien Short Line Railroad =

The Darien Short Line Railroad was intended to transport timber from Tattnall and Liberty counties in the state of Georgia to Sapelo Sound on the coast. The company was incorporated in 1885 and was authorized to transport both passengers and freight. Work began in 1889 by local businessmen using Northern capital. Track was laid from Collins in Tattnall County to McIntosh County, with a spur line carrying timber to the Sapelo River, but the company went bankrupt before the line was completed. It was then purchased by the Darien and Western Railroad in 1894, which extended it to Darien, Georgia, in 1895.
