= Augusta and Savannah Railroad =

Overview
- Locale: Georgia
- Dates of operation: 1854–1948
- Successor: Central of Georgia Railway Company

Technical
- Track gauge: 4 ft 8 1/2 in (1,435 mm) standard gauge
- Previous gauge: 5 ft (1,524 mm); American Civil War era and 4 ft 9 in (1,448 mm)

Augusta and Savannah Railroad was incorporated in Georgia by special act of the General Assembly, approved December 31, 1838, as Augusta and Waynesboro Railroad Company. The name was changed to Augusta and Savannah Railroad on February 16, 1856.

Augusta and Waynesboro Railroad Company built 53.31 miles (85.79 km) of railroad line between Millen, Georgia, and Augusta, Georgia, and 13.69 miles (22.03 km) of yard and sidetracks prior to or during 1854.

Augusta and Savannah Railroad's property, including equipment, was leased to the Central Railroad and Banking Company of Georgia, after October 31, 1895, to the Central of Georgia Railway Company, on May 1, 1862, and again on October 24, 1895. It was absorbed by the Central of Georgia Railway in 1948.

A list on passenger stops between Augusta and Millen in 1923

- Augusta (Union Station)
- Allen station
- Tahoma
- McBean
- Green's Cut
- Waynesboro
- Idlewood
- Munnerlyn
- Perkins
- Lawton
- Millen

There were no stops between Savanah and Millen on the train going towards Augusta in those days. You had to take the Savanah, Macon, and Atlanta Train to access the stops between Savanah and Millen, GA in those days.

== See also ==
- Confederate railroads in the American Civil War
