= Augusta Belt Railway =

American railway

The Augusta Belt Railway was incorporated in 1896 and was a subsidiary of the Georgia Railroad in the United States. It ran 6 miles (9.7 km) of track as a switching company in Augusta, Georgia, all the way through 1975, at which time it was dissolved.
