= Buena Vista and Ellaville Railroad =

Railroad in Georgia, United States

The Buena Vista and Ellaville Railroad is a historic railroad that operated in Georgia, USA. It was originally incorporated as the Buena Vista Railroad in 1880 and the name was changed to the Buena Vista and Ellaville Railroad in 1885 following a corporate reorganization.

The railroad ran 30 miles (48 km) of track between Buena Vista and Americus when, in July 1888, it was merged with several other lines into the Savannah and Western Railroad, a subsidiary of the Central of Georgia Railway.
