= Sand Hill, Georgia =

Unincorporated community in Georgia, U.S.

Coordinates: 33°38′21.39″N 84°58′20.79″W

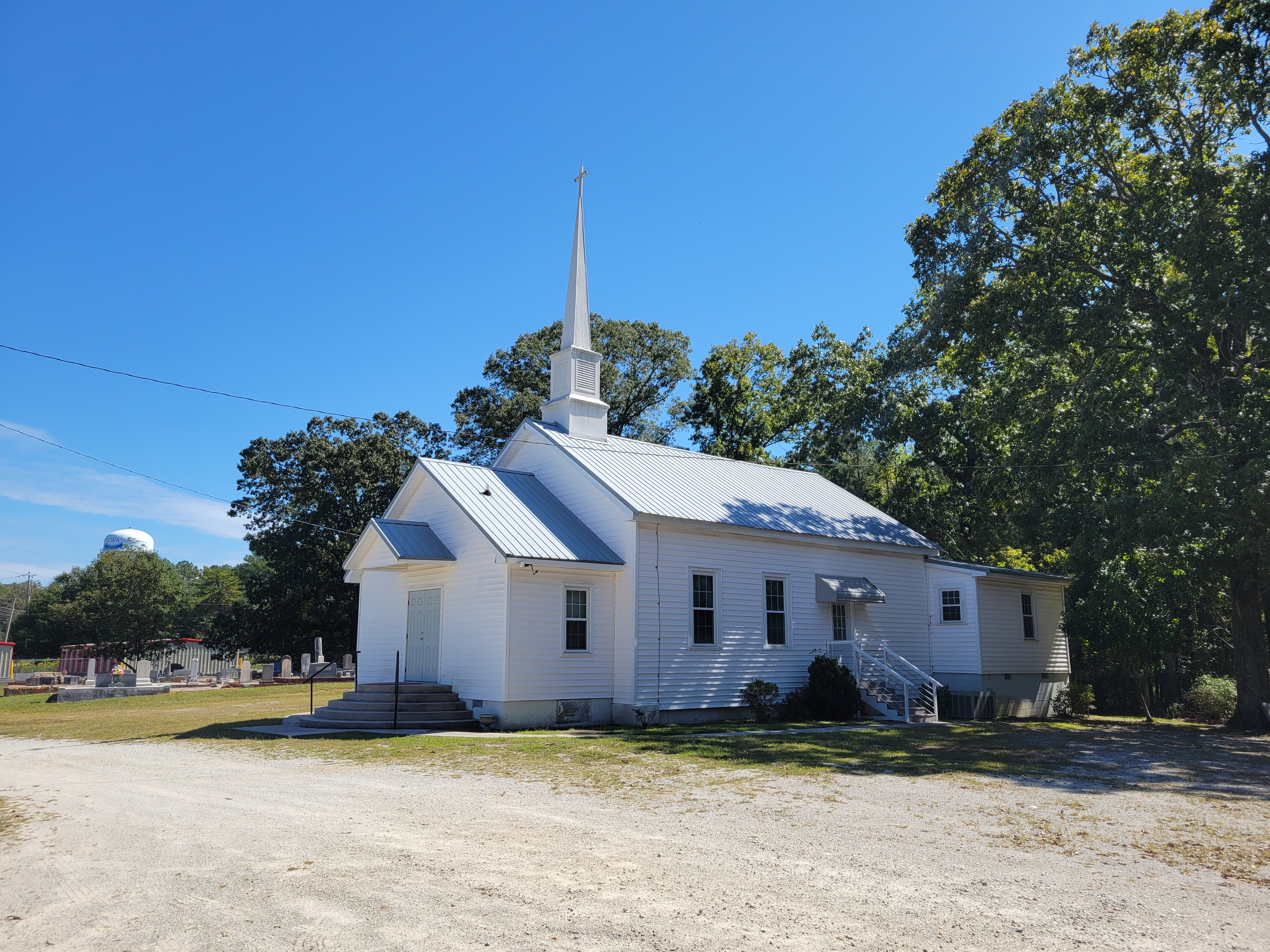
Temperance Church

Sand Hill is an unincorporated community in Carroll County, in the U.S. state of Georgia.

== History ==
A post office called Sand Hill was established in 1854, and remained in operation until 1904. Sand Hill received its descriptive name on account of the appearance of the original town site.

The Georgia General Assembly incorporated Sand Hill as a town in 1903. Sand Hill no longer is an incorporated municipality.

== Education ==
The community contains Sand Hill Elementary School, administered by the Carroll County School District.
