= Chattooga and Chickamauga Railway =

Class III railroad in Georgia, United States

Overview
- Headquarters: LaFayette, Georgia
- Reporting mark: CCKY
- Locale: Georgia and Tennessee
- Dates of operation: 1989–

Technical
- Track gauge: 4 ft 8 1/2 in (1,435 mm) standard gauge
- Length: 49 mi (79 km)

Other
- Website: https://www.gwrr.com/ccky/

The Chattooga and Chickamauga Railway (reporting mark CCKY) is a short-line railroad which is headquartered in LaFayette, Georgia, US. The railroad operates 49 miles (79 km) of the Tennessee, Alabama and Georgia Railway (a.k.a. the TAG route) from Chattanooga, Tennessee, to Kensington, Georgia, which reverted to the Norfolk Southern System and was partially removed after the Dow Reichhold Specialty Latex LLC plant in Kensington closed in August 2008. The "C&C" also operates 42 miles (68 km) of the former Central of Georgia Railway from Chattanooga to Lyerly, Georgia. That line is leased from the state of Georgia.

The CCKY is owned by the Georgia Department of Transportation, and operated by CAGY Industries. The operating lease was acquired in 2008 by Genesee & Wyoming Inc. The line does see operations of passenger trains between Chattanooga, Tennessee and Summerville, Georgia during weekends in the fall months and on other published dates during the year. The passenger trains are owned and operated by the nearby Tennessee Valley Railroad Museum and may be powered by steam locomotives or early vintage diesel electric locomotives.

== Locomotives ==
The locomotives the C&C operated were 102 (former Chicago and North Western Transportation Company EMD GP7, now retired), 103 (former Santa Fe CF7, now retired and scrapped). Operational presently are the 2050 (EMD GP38) and Columbus & Greenville 1804 (former Illinois Central GP11). Also, they use a Tennessee Valley Railroad Museum locomotive if one of their locomotives needs repair or is out of service.

== Gallery ==
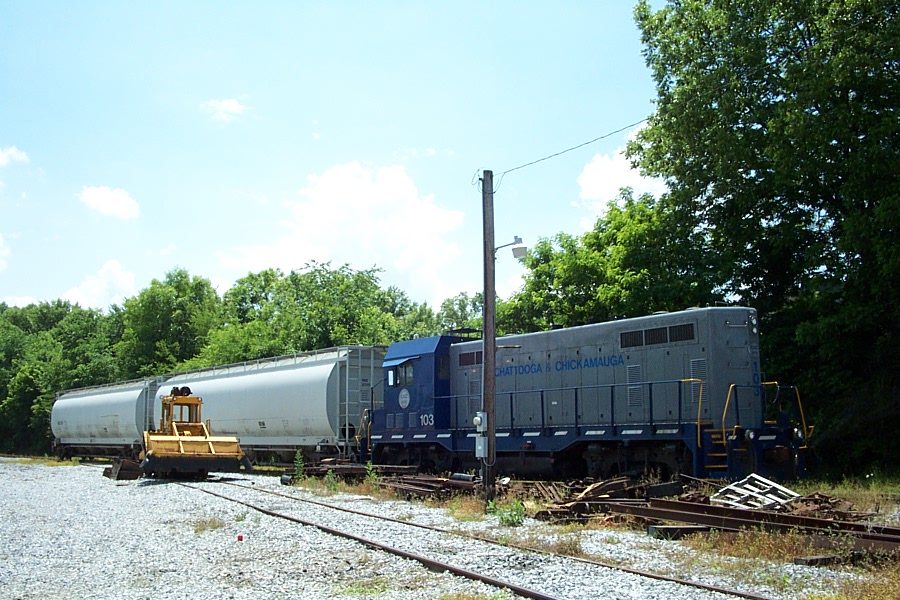
Chattooga & Chickamauga 103 rests at LaFayette, Georgia

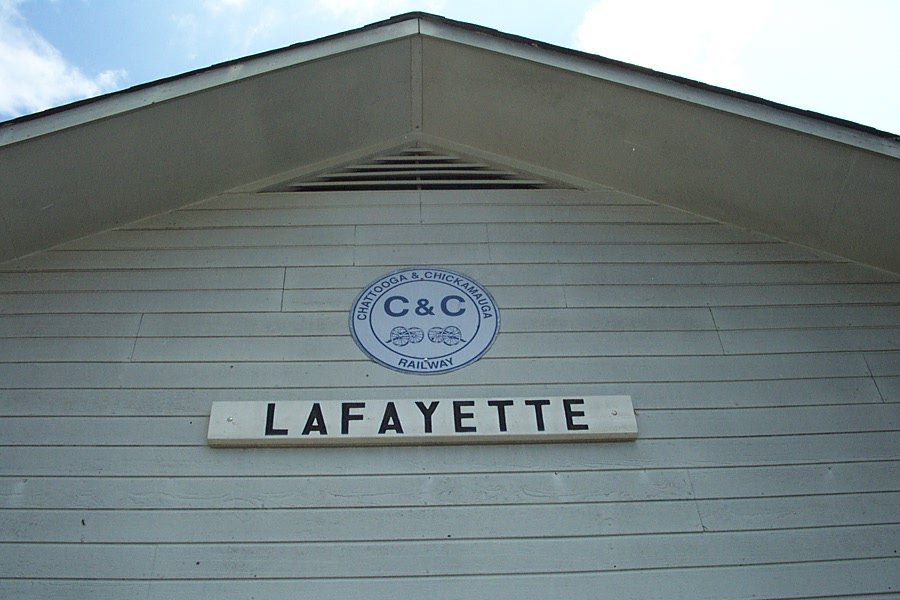
Chattooga & Chickamauga logo and station identification sign at LaFayette, Georgia yard office

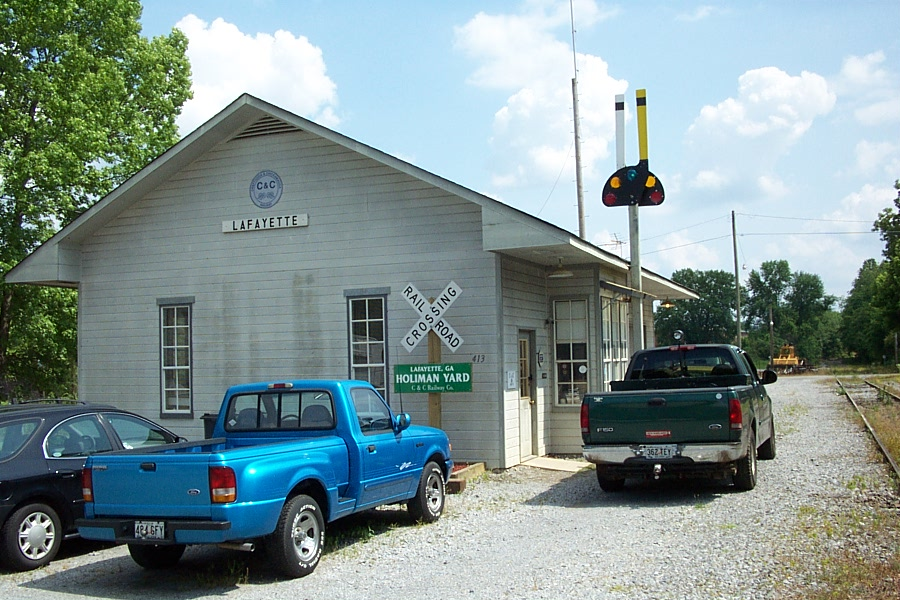
Chattooga & Chickamauga yard office at Holiman Yard in LaFayette, Georgia.
