= Collins and Reidsville Railroad =

Testing

Constructed in 1896, the Collins and Reidsville Railroad (C&R) ran about 7 miles (11 km) between Collins and Reidsville, Georgia, USA. In 1906 the C&R was part of a merger that formed the Georgia Coast and Piedmont Railroad.
