= Carey Short Line =

Railroad in Carey, Ohio, US

Overview
- Locale: Ohio

Carey Short Line was a short-line railroad that was operated by Wheeling and Lake Erie Railway (WE) and CSX Transportation (CSX) before being abandoned. It did not itself operate trains. The short piece of track is a remnant of the Mad River railroad. The line was in Carey, Ohio.
