= Rome and Northern Railroad =

The Rome and Northern Railroad, connecting from West Rome near the former crucial Brick factory to Gore in Chattooga County, was chartered in 1909, with its completion coming on July 1, 1910 at a length of 17.645 miles. The railroads primary function was to move iron ore from mines in Schaleton, Georgia (extinct) and areas surrounding Gore to furnaces in Rome and Silver Creek Furnace. Passenger service was offered at stops along its route including Armuchee, Georgia.

During its construction the railroad was subject to two lawsuits from land owners affected by the Railroads right-of-way including Miss Martha Berry founder of Berry College. The route was eventually supposed to be continued on (for a total length of about 38 miles) past Gore all the way to Tunnel Hill, Catoosa County. After mining of the ore in Chattooga County became uneconomical the railroad went bankrupt and was purchased by local investors. As a result, the railroad was abandoned by 1923.

For further reading, details of the railroad can be found in the special collections of the Sara Hightower Regional Library.
