= Columbus and Rome Railway =

Railroad in Georgia, United States

The Columbus and Rome Railway is a historic, 3 ft (914 mm) narrow gauge railroad that operated in the U.S. state of Georgia.

Chartered in 1871 as the North and South Railroad of Georgia, the Columbus and Rome Railway opened in 1873 with a 20-mile (32 km) line going north out of Columbus, Georgia. The railroad was eventually extended to Hamilton, Georgia, and by 1888 was operating as far as Greenville. At some time during the final construction to Greenville, the railroad was acquired by and consolidated into the Savannah and Western Railroad, a subsidiary of the Central of Georgia Railway.
