= North and South Railroad of Georgia =

Defunct railroad in Georgia

The North and South Railroad of Georgia was chartered in 1870 to build a 3 ft (914 mm) narrow gauge railroad from Columbus to Rome, Georgia. In 1878, after building about 20 miles (32 km), the railroad went bankrupt and was reorganized as the Columbus and Rome Railway in 1879.
