= Savannah Port Terminal Railroad =

Overview
- Headquarters: Garden City, Georgia
- Reporting mark: SAPT
- Locale: Georgia
- Dates of operation: June 9, 1998; 28 years ago–

Technical
- Track gauge: 4 ft 8 1/2 in (1,435 mm) standard gauge

The Savannah Port Terminal Railroad (reporting mark SAPT) is a terminal railroad that began operations on June 9, 1998, taking over track operations from the Savannah State Docks Railroad. It operates about 18 miles (29 km) of track and handles about 46,000 cars annually. Genesee & Wyoming Inc. acquired SAPT in 1998. SAPT may handle cars of 286,000 pounds gross weight, and it has two interchanges: CSX (Garden City, Georgia); Norfolk Southern (Garden City, Georgia).
