= Bowden Lithia Springs Short Line Railroad =

Railway line in Georgia, United States

The Bowden Lithia Springs Short Line Railroad is a historic, 3 ft (914 mm) narrow gauge railroad that operated in the U.S. state of Georgia.

It opened in 1885 as a private railroad operating only for guests of the Sweet Water Park Hotel near Lithia Springs over 2.5 mi (4.0 km) of track. During its existence, it was also known as the Salt Springs and Bowden Lithia Railroad.

The railroad wasn't actually chartered until 1887, and it was abandoned in 1913.
