= Covington and Macon Railroad =

The Covington and Macon Railroad was founded in 1885 and began operations in 1887 between Macon and Hillsboro, Georgia. It eventually stretched 102 miles (164 km), operating from Macon to Athens, Georgia. However, it went bankrupt and was sold at public auction in 1891. It was then reorganized as the Macon and Northern Railroad.
