= Reidsville and Southeastern Railroad =

Railroad line between Reidsville and Ludowici, Georgia, USA

The Reidsville and Southeastern Railroad was founded in 1905 and ran a 36-mile (58 km) line between Reidsville and Ludowici, Georgia, USA. In 1906 it became part of a merger of several railroads to form the Georgia Coast and Piedmont Railroad.
