= Georgia and Florida Railroad (1926–1963) =

Railway line in the Southern United States

The Georgia and Florida Railroad was a railroad in the Southern U.S. known as the Georgia and Florida Railway from 1906 to 1926 and 1963 to 1971. It had a main line from Madison, Florida to Greenwood, South Carolina. The Southern Railway gained control in 1963, reorganized it as the Georgia and Florida Railway, and merged it into subsidiary Central of Georgia Railroad in 1971.

At the end of 1960 G&F operated 321 miles of road on 395 miles of track; that year it reported 569 million ton-miles of revenue freight and no passengers.
