= Chattanooga, Rome and Columbus Railroad =

Railroad in Georgia, United States

Overview
- Locale: Tennessee and Georgia, United States
- Dates of operation: 1887–1897

Technical
- Track gauge: 4 ft 8 1/2 in (1,435 mm)
- Previous gauge: 3 ft (914 mm)

The Chattanooga, Rome and Columbus Railroad (CR&C) was a railroad in Georgia.

Originally chartered in 1881 as the Rome and Carrollton Railroad, the railroad's name became the Chattanooga, Rome and Columbus Railroad in 1887, before any tracks were constructed.

The railroad started construction between Rome and Cedartown, Georgia, as a 3 ft (914 mm) narrow gauge railroad, but the 20 miles (32 km) of rail were quickly torn up and made 4 ft 8 1/2 in (1,435 mm) standard gauge. By 1888, the railroad had more than 157 miles (253 km) of track, including a line from Chattanooga, Tennessee, to Carrollton, Georgia, and several smaller branch lines. In 1891, the Savannah and Western Railroad purchased the CR&C, but when the S&W went bankrupt, Federal Courts returned the CR&C to its original owners. In 1897, the railroad was sold to Simon Borg and Company and renamed the Chattanooga, Rome and Southern Railroad.

== See also ==
- Chattanooga Choo Choo
