= Collins, Georgia =

- City
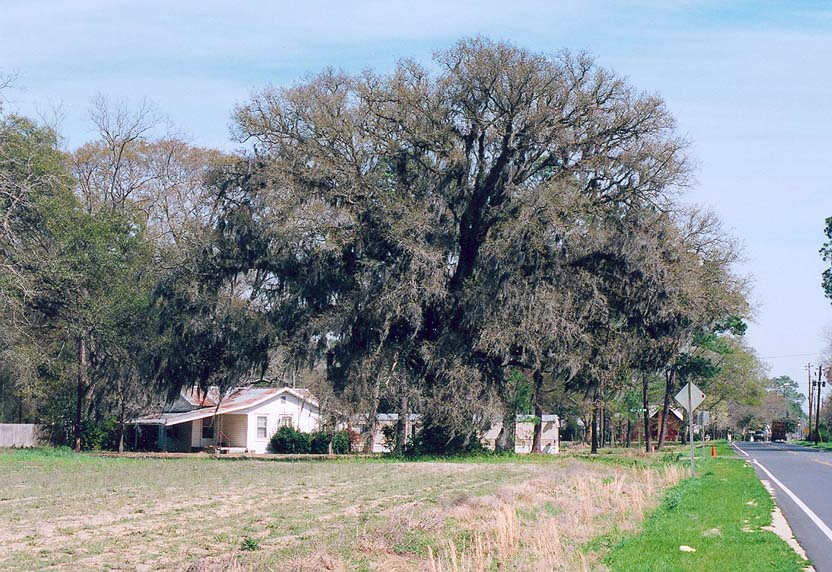
- Southern live oak and farmhouse near Collins

- Location in Tattnall County and the state of Georgia
- Coordinates: 32°10′43″N 82°6′36″W
- Country: United States
- State: Georgia
- County: Tattnall

Area
  - Total: 1.03 sq mi (2.68 km^{2})
  - Land: 1.02 sq mi (2.64 km^{2})
  - Water: 0.015 sq mi (0.04 km^{2})
- Elevation: 230 ft (70 m)

Population (2020)
  - Total: 540
  - Density: 529.4/sq mi (204.41/km^{2})
- Time zone: UTC-5 (Eastern (EST))
  - Summer (DST): UTC-4 (EDT)
- ZIP code: 30421
- Area code: 912
- FIPS code: 13-17832
- GNIS feature ID: 0312845

Collins is a city in Tattnall County, Georgia, United States. The population was 540 in 2020.

== History ==
A post office called Collins has been in operation since 1890. The Georgia General Assembly incorporated Collins as a town in 1894, and as a city in 1905. The community was named after Perry Collins, an early settler.

== Geography ==
Collins is located at 32°00′43″N 82°6′36″W (32.178748, -82.109979). According to the United States Census Bureau, the city has a total area of 1.0 square mile (2.6 km^{2}), all of it land.

== Demographics ==
Historical population
| Census | Pop. | Note | %± |
|---|---|---|---|
| 1910 | 327 | | — |
| 1920 | 505 | | 54.4% |
| 1930 | 510 | | 1.0% |
| 1940 | 712 | | 39.6% |
| 1950 | 638 | | −10.4% |
| 1960 | 565 | | −11.4% |
| 1970 | 574 | | 1.6% |
| 1980 | 639 | | 11.3% |
| 1990 | 528 | | −17.4% |
| 2000 | 528 | | 0.0% |
| 2010 | 584 | | 10.6% |
| 2020 | 540 | | −7.5% |
U.S. Decennial Census

=== Racial and ethnic composition ===
Collins city, Georgia – Racial and ethnic composition Note: the US Census treats Hispanic/Latino as an ethnic category. This table excludes Latinos from the racial categories and assigns them to a separate category. Hispanics/Latinos may be of any race.
| Race / Ethnicity (NH = Non-Hispanic) | Pop 2000 | Pop 2010 | Pop 2020 | % 2000 | % 2010 | % 2020 |
|---|---|---|---|---|---|---|
| White alone (NH) | 305 | 338 | 261 | 57.77% | 57.88% | 48.33% |
| Black or African American alone (NH) | 218 | 222 | 221 | 41.29% | 38.01% | 40.93% |
| Native American or Alaska Native alone (NH) | 0 | 0 | 0 | 0.00% | 0.00% | 0.00% |
| Asian alone (NH) | 0 | 0 | 0 | 0.00% | 0.00% | 0.00% |
| Native Hawaiian or Pacific Islander alone (NH) | 0 | 0 | 0 | 0.00% | 0.00% | 0.00% |
| Other race alone (NH) | 0 | 0 | 0 | 0.00% | 0.00% | 0.00% |
| Mixed race or Multiracial (NH) | 3 | 5 | 17 | 0.57% | 0.86% | 3.15% |
| Hispanic or Latino (any race) | 2 | 19 | 41 | 0.38% | 3.25% | 7.59% |
| Total | 528 | 584 | 540 | 100.00% | 100.00% | 100.00% |

=== 2000 census ===
As of the census of 2000, there were 528 people, 237 households, and 141 families residing in the city. By 2020, its population was 540.

== Education ==
Collins Elementary and Middle Schools are located at 720 and 720a on the northwest side of Main Street. Over 300 elementary students and 100 middle schoolers attend the public schools, which are a part of the Tattnall County School District in Georgia.
