= Central of Georgia Railway =

Railroad constructed to join Macon, Georgia, and Savannah, Georgia

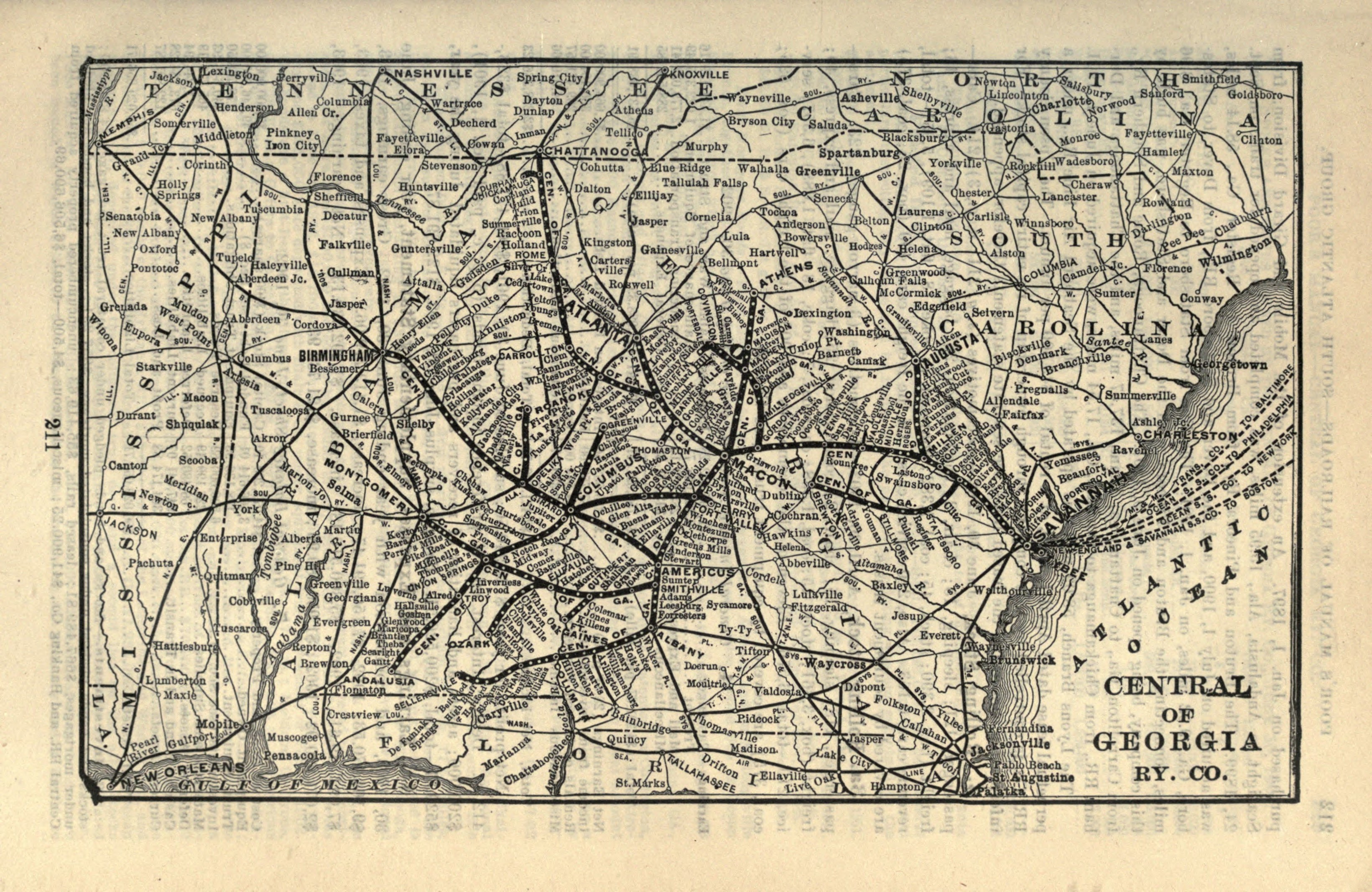
- 1903 map of the Central of Georgia Railway

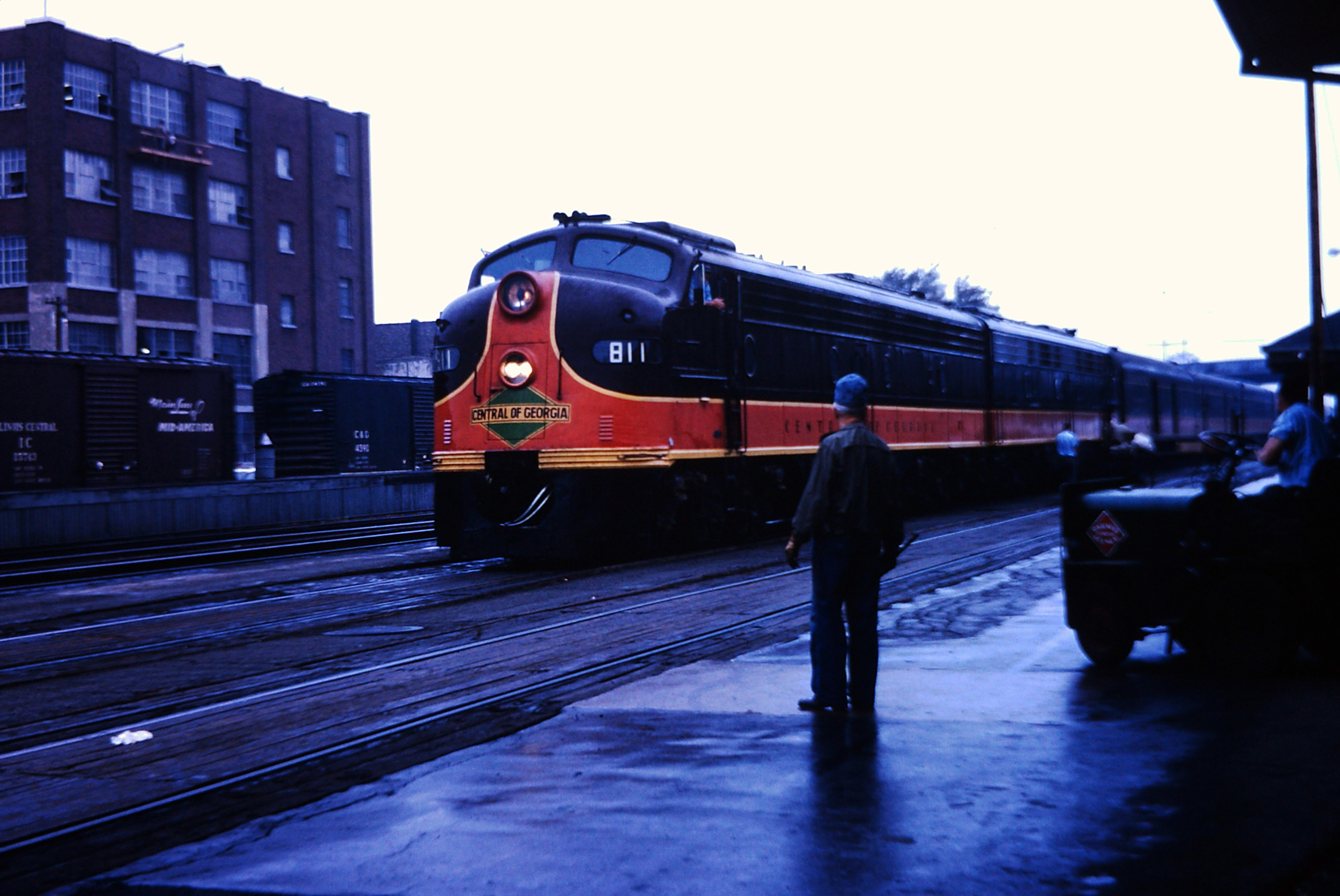
- The City of Miami in 1964, painted in Illinois Central colors, not CofG's own livery

Overview
- Headquarters: Savannah, Georgia
- Reporting mark: CG
- Locale: Georgia, Alabama
- Dates of operation: 1895–1963
- Successor: split between Southern Railway later Norfolk Southern and St. Louis-San Francisco Railway then Burlington Northern now BNSF

Technical
- Track gauge: 4 ft 8 1/2 in (1,435 mm) standard gauge
- Previous gauge: 5 ft (1,524 mm), civil war era and4 ft 9 in (1,448 mm)
- Length: 1,944 miles (3,129 km) in 1929

Central Railroad and Banking Company of Ga. listed in Sholes' directory of the city of Macon, 1894

The Central of Georgia Railway (reporting mark CG; abbreviated CofG) was a railroad in Georgia, United States, that was active from 1895–1963. It started as the Central Rail Road and Canal Company in 1833. As a way to better attract investment capital, the railroad changed its name to Central Rail Road and Banking Company of Georgia. This railroad was constructed to join the Macon and Western Railroad at Macon, Georgia, in the United States, and run to Savannah. This created a rail link from Chattanooga, on the Tennessee River, to seaports on the Atlantic Ocean. It took from 1837 to 1843 to build the railroad from Savannah to the eastern bank of the Ocmulgee River at Macon; a bridge into the city was not built until 1851.

The company was purchased by the Southern Railway in 1963, and subsequently became part of Norfolk Southern Railway in 1982.

Despite the similarity between the names, neither the Georgia Central Railway or Georgia Railroad have ties with the Central of Georgia Railway.

== Acquisitions ==
Over the years, this railroad steadily acquired other railroads by either lease or purchase:

- Augusta and Savannah Railroad 1862
  - Augusta and Waynesboro Railroad 1857
- Eatonton Branch Railroad 1855
- Milledgeville and Eatonton Railroad 1855
- Milledgeville and Gordon Railroad 1855
- Mobile and Girard Railroad 1886
  - Girard Railroad 1857
- Savannah and Tybee Railroad 1890
- Savannah and Western Railroad 1890
  - Chattanooga, Rome and Columbus Railroad 1891
    - Rome and Carrollton Railroad 1887
  - Columbus and Rome Railroad 1888
    - Columbus and Atlanta Air Line Railroad 1879
      - North and South Railroad of Georgia 1877
  - Columbus and Western Railroad 1888
    - Savannah and Memphis Railroad 1880
  - East Alabama Railroad 1888
    - East Alabama and Cincinnati Railroad 1880
- Savannah, Griffin and Northern Alabama Railroad 1890
- Southwestern of Georgia Railroad 1869
  - Montgomery and Eufaula Railroad 1879
  - Muscogee Railroad 1868
  - Vicksburg and Brunswick Railroad 1879
  - Southwestern Railroad 1869
- Upson County Railroad 1891
  - Barnesville and Thomaston Railroad 1860

== Corporate history ==
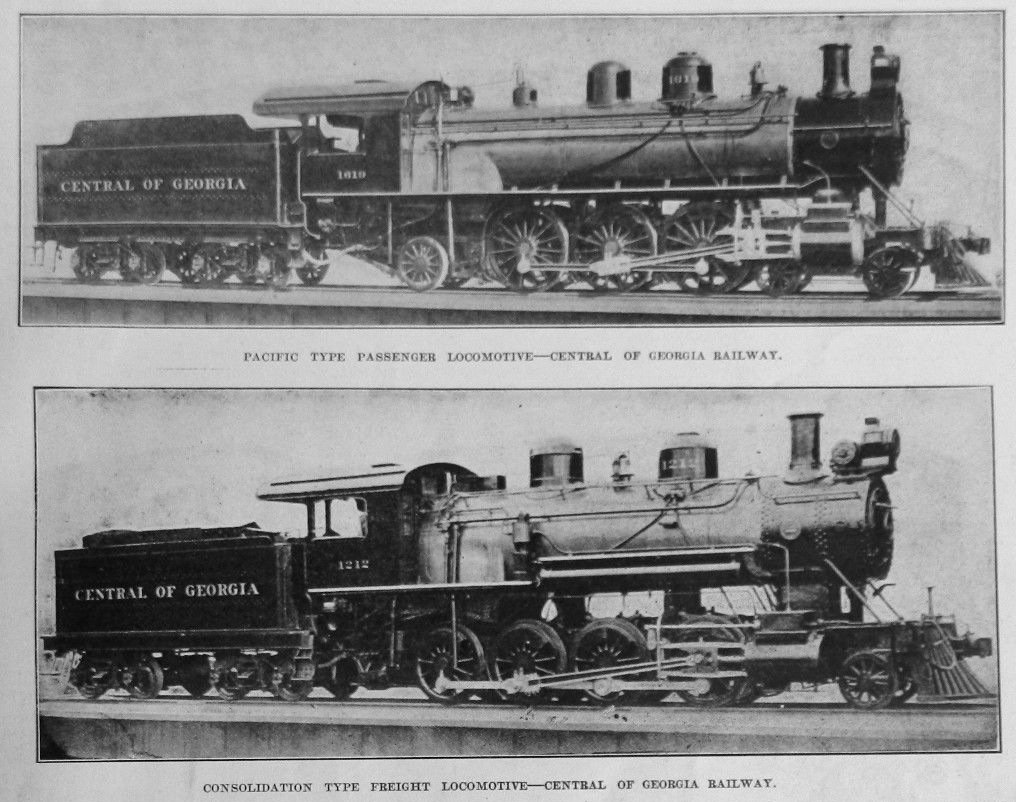
Central of Georgia Baldwin locomotives, 1907

In 1888, the Richmond Terminal Company, a Virginia holding company, gained control of the Central. The financial problems of the parent company forced the CofG into bankruptcy, and it was sold at foreclosure three years later, being reorganized as the Central of Georgia Railway on November 1, 1895.

In 1907, railroad magnate and financier E. H. Harriman gained a controlling interest in the railway, and in 1909, sold his interest to the Illinois Central Railroad, which he also controlled. In 1932, during the Great Depression, the CofG went into receivership, from which it did not emerge until 1948. In 1956, the St. Louis-San Francisco Railway ("Frisco"), seeking a route to Atlantic Ocean ports, gained control of the CofG, but the Interstate Commerce Commission declined to approve a merger of the two roads, so the Frisco sold its CofG stock to the Southern Railway in 1963.

At the end of 1956, the CofG operated 1,764 miles (2,839 km) of road and 2,646 miles (4,258 km) of track; that year it reported 3208 million net ton-miles of revenue freight and 73 million passenger-miles. Those totals do not include the 144-mile (232 km) Savannah and Atlanta, the 10-mile (16 km) L&W, the 20-mile (32 km) Wadley Southern or the 36-mile (58 km) Wrightsville and Tennille.

The CofG became a Southern Railway subsidiary on June 17, 1963. In 1971, the Southern formed the Central of Georgia Railroad to merge the Central of Georgia Railway, the Savannah and Atlanta Railway, and the Wrightsville and Tennille Railroad.

== Passenger operations ==
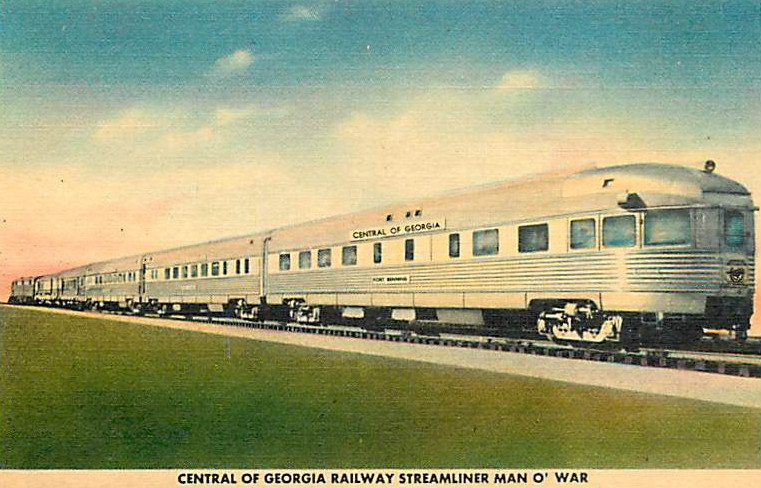
Postcard depiction of the streamliner Man o' War. It was well known for its four beautiful Budd built streamlined cars.

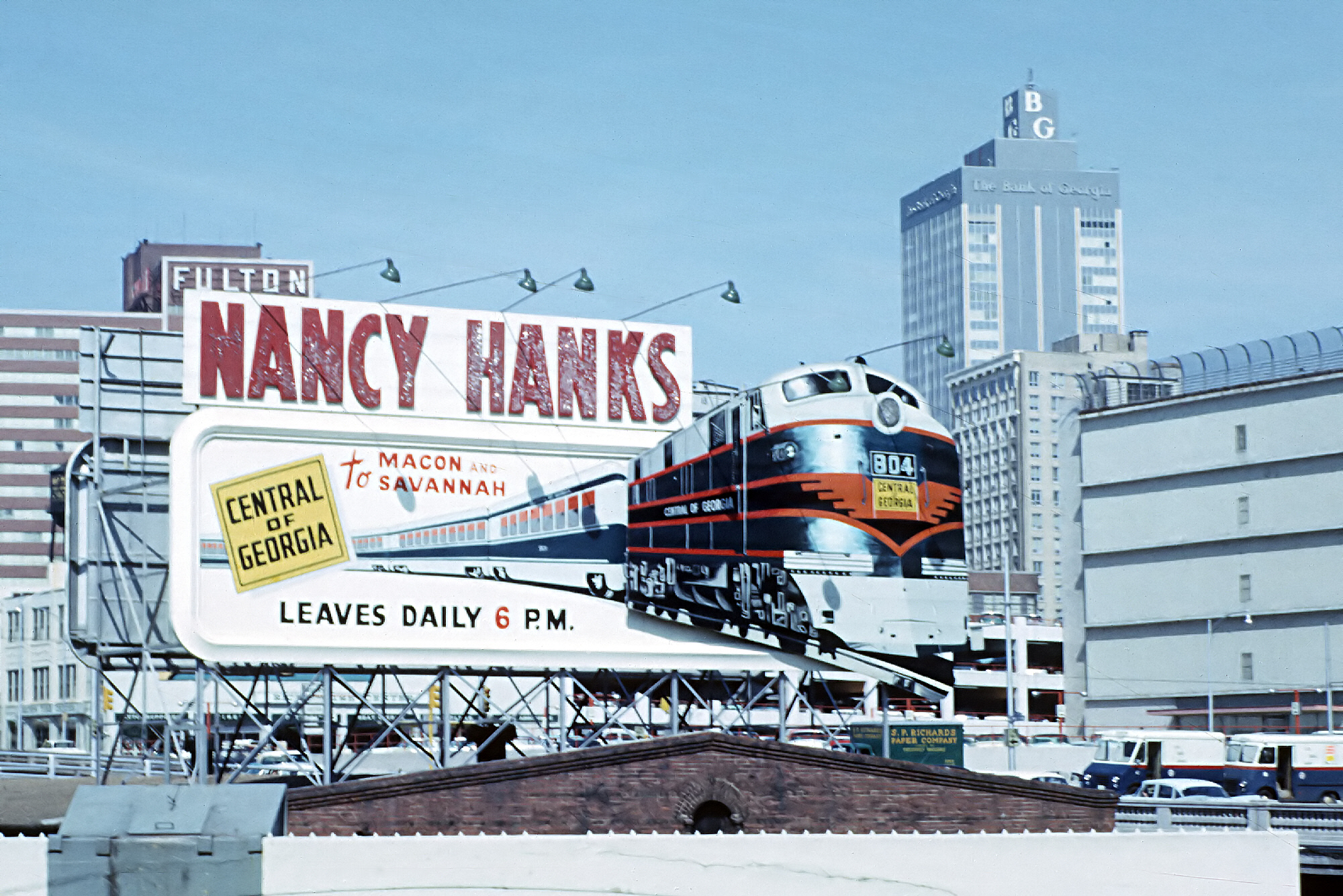
Atlanta billboard advertising the Nancy Hanks, 1963

The famous passenger train, the Nancy Hanks II (1947–1971), ran from Atlanta to Savannah, via Macon. It had the two added on the end to distinguish it from a short-lived train the Central sal in the 1890s. Another notable train was the Man o' War (1947–1970), a Columbus – Atlanta route, via Newnan. Both of these trains were named after prize-winning racehorses. When Amtrak took control of the Southern Railway's passenger service in 1971, The Southern decided to discontinue the "Nancy Hanks II" but continue operating the "Crescent Limited" until 1977.

Into the mid-1950s, the CofG, with the Alabama & Saint Andrews Bay Railroad, operated passenger trains headed for the Gulf Coast resort city Panama City, Florida.

Long distance inter-state trains operated on Central of Georgia tracks as part of their itineraries: City of Miami (Chicago-Miami), Southland (Chicago & Cincinnati to St. Petersburg), Flamingo (Cincinnati-Jacksonville) and Seminole (Chicago-Jacksonville).

Well into the 1960s, CofG trains remained segregated, long after most Southern railroads abolished racial bars following a desegregation order by the Interstate Commerce Commission.

== In recent years ==
Today the Central of Georgia exists only as a paper railroad within the Norfolk Southern Railway group. The Chattooga and Chickamauga Railway leases 42 miles (68 km) of the CofG's former mainline from the State of Georgia. On April 5, 2012, Norfolk Southern unveiled NS 8101, a GE ES44AC painted in the scheme found on Central of Georgia's diesel locomotives. It was the fourth of 20 units that NS painted in the colors of their predecessors.

== Preserved historic sites ==
A number of former properties of Central of Georgia are preserved as historic sites. These include the following, listed on the National Register of Historic Places:

- Central of Georgia Depot (Andalusia, Alabama)
- Central of Georgia Railway: Savannah Shops and Terminal Facilities, in Georgia. It is currently the Georgia State Railroad Museum, and the Savannah History Museum.
- Macon Terminal Complex in Macon, Georgia is partially preserved, including the terminal head house, and the foundations of some of the Central of Georgia buildings there, including the original 1880s roundhouse.
- The Central of Georgia Depot in Millen, GA has been preserved as yard offices for Norfolk Southern, the successor of the Central of Georgia.

== Existing equipment ==
This list includes, but is not limited to the preserved engines and rolling stock of the Central of Georgia Railway.

Locomotives:

- Central of Georgia Railway 509 (2-8-0) Central City Park, Macon, Ga
- Central of Georgia Railway 349 (4-4-0) Children's Hospital at Erlanger Chattanooga, Tn, on loan from the Tennessee Valley Railroad Museum
- Central of Georgia Railway 109, later W.T. Smith Lumber Co. 14 (4-4-0) Pioneer Museum Of Alabama, Troy, Al
- Central of Georgia Railway 1 (SW-1) Georgia State Railroad Museum, Savannah, Ga
- Central of Georgia Railway 223 (2-8-0) Georgia State Railroad Museum, Savannah, Ga
- Central of Georgia Railway 109 (RS-3) Tennessee Valley Railroad Museum, Chattanooga, Tn
- Central of Georgia Railway 201 (SD7), currently painted as Southern Railway 197, at Virginia Museum of Transportation

Rolling Stock:

- Jim Crow Passenger Car(s) 606 and 607 built by the Pullman Company in 1911 To serve The Central Of Georgia's growing passenger demand and both are currently owned by the Tennessee Valley Railroad Museum.
- Passenger Car 660 built by American Car and Foundry for service on the Nancy Hanks II in 1947 and is currently on display in Meridian, Mississippi.
- Passenger Car 661 built by American Car and Foundry for service on the Nancy Hanks II in 1947 and is currently owned by the Tennessee Valley Railroad Museum.
- Passenger Car 662 built by American Car and Foundry in 1947 for use on the Nancy Hanks II and is currently owned by the Southeastern Railway Museum (Currently on lease to TVRM).
- Jim Crow Passenger Car 527 built by Pullman in 1924, later used on The Seminole. It is currently owned by the Southeastern Railway Museum.
- Jim Crow Passenger Car 906 built by Pullman in 1924 as 623, later becoming 528. 528 served on the Man O'War as the only heavyweight, and was painted aluminium to match the lightweight cars from 1951 to 1954. It was later painted autumn harvest and used on The Seminole. Finally, the car saw service on the Southern Steam Specials before coming to the Tennessee Valley Railroad Museum.
- Jim Crow Passenger Car 907 built by the American Car & Foundry. 907 was built in 1947 as 543 to serve The Central Of Georgia's growing passenger demand in the Post-War period as a lightweight. It is currently owned by the Tennessee Valley Railroad Museum.
- Caboose 31580, built by the company's own Macon, GA shops in 1937, currently resides at the New Hope Railroad in New Hope, PA.
- Caboose X-92. The wood caboose was built in 1916 as a ventilated boxcar, and the Central of Georgia converted the car into a caboose in 1942. On display at the Southeastern Railway Museum in Duluth, GA.

== Heritage Unit ==
For Norfolk Southern's 30th anniversary, NS painted 20 new locomotives into predecessor schemes. NS #8101, a GE ES44AC locomotive, was painted into the Central of Georgia scheme.

== See also ==
- Georgia State Railroad Museum and Savannah History Museum (located at Savannah Shops)
- Leesburg Depot, in southwest Georgia
