= Savannah, Americus and Montgomery Railway =

Former rail line in Georgia and Alabama, US

Overview
- Reporting mark: SA&M
- Locale: Georgia and Alabama
- Dates of operation: 1888–1900
- Predecessor: Americus, Preston and Lumpkin Railroad
- Successor: Georgia and Alabama Railroad; Seaboard Air Line Railroad; Seaboard Coast Line Railroad; CSX Transportation; Heart of Georgia Railroad; Georgia Southwestern Railroad

Technical
- Track gauge: 4 ft 8 1/2 in (1,435 mm) (standard gauge)

The Savannah, Americus and Montgomery Railway (SA&M) was a historic railroad located in the U.S. states of Georgia and Alabama. SA&M was built in the 1880s running between Montgomery, Alabama and Lyons, Georgia. It would be completed to Savannah, Georgia in 1896 after being renamed the Georgia and Alabama Railway. The line would notably become part of the Seaboard Air Line Railroad network in 1900.

== History ==
=== Early years ===
The first segment of the Savannah, Americus and Montgomery Railway was chartered in 1884 as the 3 ft (914 mm) narrow gauge Americus, Preston and Lumpkin Railroad, which ran from Louvale to Abbeville. The Americus, Preston and Lumpkin Railroad was reorganized as Savannah, Americus and Montgomery Railway in 1888. In 1890, the line was extended from Abbeville east to Lyons. A year later, the SA&M was extended west from Louvale across the Chattahoochee River to Montgomery, Alabama, which opened on December 1, 1891. During construction, the gauge of the track was converted from 3 ft (914 mm) narrow gauge to the 4 ft 8 1/2 in (1,435 mm) standard gauge. By 1891, the railroad operated five riverboats on the Ocmulgee River and the Altamaha River. In 1892, the SA&M leased the Albany, Florida and Northern Railway which ran from the SA&M at Cordele to Albany. At its peak, the railroad had a length of 340 miles.

=== Receivership ===
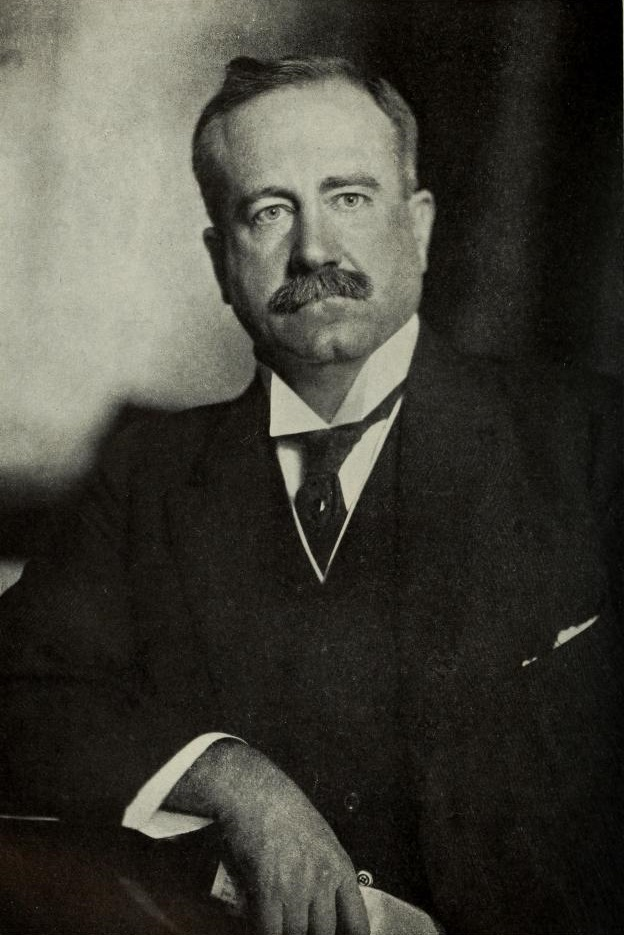
John Skelton Williams

In 1895, the SA&M went into receivership. The lease of the Albany, Florida and Northern Railway was terminated, which then became the independent Albany and Northern Railway. The SA&M was bought by a syndicate that included the Richmond bankers John L. Williams and Sons. One of John L. Williams's sons, John Skelton Williams, became president of the line, renaming it the Georgia and Alabama Railway (not to be confused with the Georgia and Alabama Railroad, a separate railroad which was based further north in Rome, Georgia). The line was finally extended to Savannah in 1896. The Georgia and Alabama Railway would also acquire the Abbeville and Waycross Railroad. The Georgia and Alabama Railway ran a daily passenger train from Savannah to Montgomery, and the line was nicknamed the "Savannah Short Line" since it has the shortest route between the two cities compared to its competitors.

=== Seaboard Air Line ownership ===
Savannah and Montgomery Subdivisions

Overview
- Status: Segments still operating under successor company
- Owner: Seaboard Air Line Railroad
- Termini: Savannah, Georgia; Montgomery, Alabama

Technical
- Line length: 335.2 mi (539.5 km)
- Electrification: No

In January 1899, John Skelton Williams's syndicate offered to purchase a majority of shares in railroads along the east coast of the United States that would become the Seaboard Air Line Railroad. By 1900, the Georgia and Alabama Railway formally became part of the Seaboard Air Line. John Skelton Williams served as the first president of the Seaboard Air Line, and he would later serve as the United States Comptroller of the Currency. The Georgia and Alabama Railway connected to the Seaboard Air Line's main line in Savannah. Once under the ownership of the Seaboard Air Line, the line was designated as the company's Savannah Subdivision from Savannah to Americus, and the Montgomery Subdivision from Americus to Montgomery. The Seaboard continued to operate passenger service between Savannah and Montgomery, as well as local freight trains and their Red Ball freight trains along the route. This included named freight trains such as the Alaga and the Pioneer.

In 1944, the Seaboard Air Line acquired the Georgia Florida and Alabama Railway, which ran from Richland south to Florida. This acquisition generated more traffic on the former SA&M since it provided the Seaboard with not only an additional route to Florida, but also a direct route to Florida from Montgomery.

The Seaboard Air Line discontinued passenger service from Savannah to Montgomery on the line in 1951.

On June 28, 1959, a Seaboard mixed freight train derailed on the line crossing the Ogeechee River in Meldrim. Loaded LPG tank cars from the train plunged into the river below and ruptured. The resulting fire and explosion from the ruptured tanks killed 23 people along the river that day as it was a popular area to swim and picnic at.

=== Later years ===
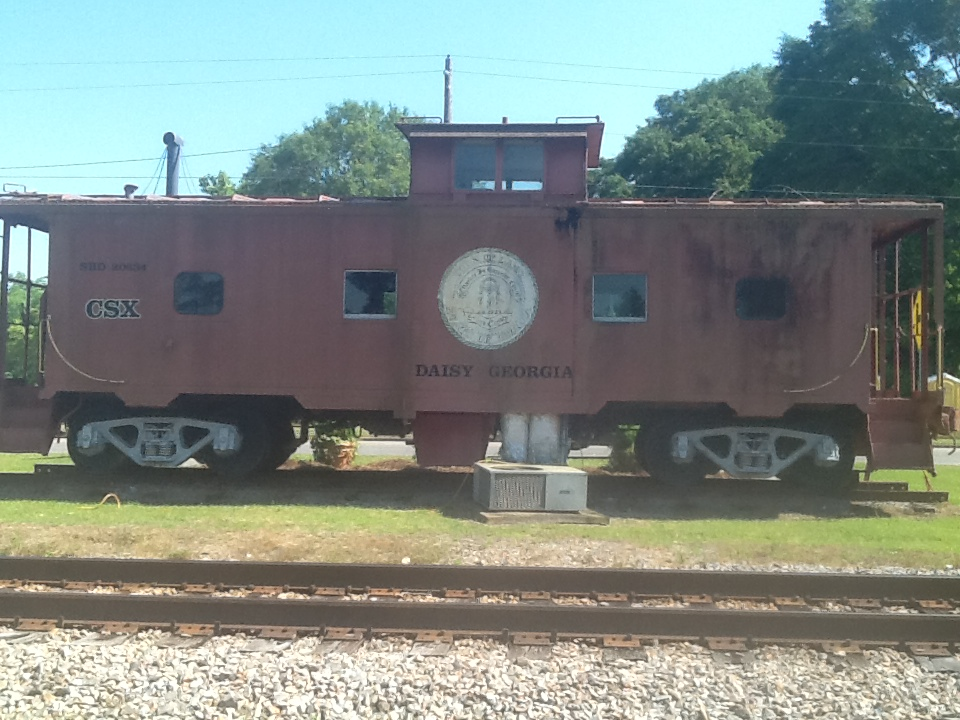
The caboose in Daisy, Georgia, which commemorates the importance of the railroad to Daisy's history.

In 1967, the Seaboard Air Line merged with its rival, the Atlantic Coast Line Railroad, and the combined company was named the Seaboard Coast Line Railroad. The Atlantic Coast Line operated a nearly parallel route between Savannah and Montgomery just to the south (much of that line was historically the Savannah, Florida and Western Railway). The company initially retained both lines in the combined network and designated the Seaboard Air Line route as the Vidalia Subdivision from Savannah to Americus, and the Americus Subdivision from Americus to Montgomery (the Savannah Subdivision designation was later reused by successor CSX for the company's main lines in Savannah). While the SA&M line remained in service after the merger, traffic diminished since the company favored the Atlantic Coast Line's route from Savannah to Montgomery.

In the 1970s, the town of Plains, Georgia along the line would become famous for being the hometown of Georgia Governor and U.S. President Jimmy Carter. Carter used the railroad's depot in Plains, which was built in 1888, as the headquarters for his successful 1976 presidential campaign.

In 1980, the Seaboard Coast Line's parent company merged with the Chessie System, creating the CSX Corporation. The CSX Corporation initially operated the Chessie and Seaboard Systems separately until 1986, when they were merged into CSX Transportation.

The line was abandoned between Montgomery and Mahrt, Alabama (located along the Chattahoochee River near Cottonton) on April 20, 1986. The remaining line from Mahrt to Rhine, Georgia was sold by CSX Transportation to the Georgia Southwestern Railroad on June 5, 1989. Georgia Southwestern ended operations on the line from Preston to Mahrt in 1999, and the state of Georgia acquired the segment and sought a new operator for the line. The Heart of Georgia Railroad was created in 1999 for the purpose of operating the line on behalf of the state. On May 22, 2000, the state purchased the remaining portion of the line not already under their ownership between Omaha, Georgia and the end of the line across the Chattahoochee River in Mahrt as well as an additional 71.13 miles (114.47 km) between Rochelle and Preston retained by the Georgia Southwestern. The Heart of Georgia took over operations of the line from the Georgia Southwestern in 2000.

== Current conditions ==
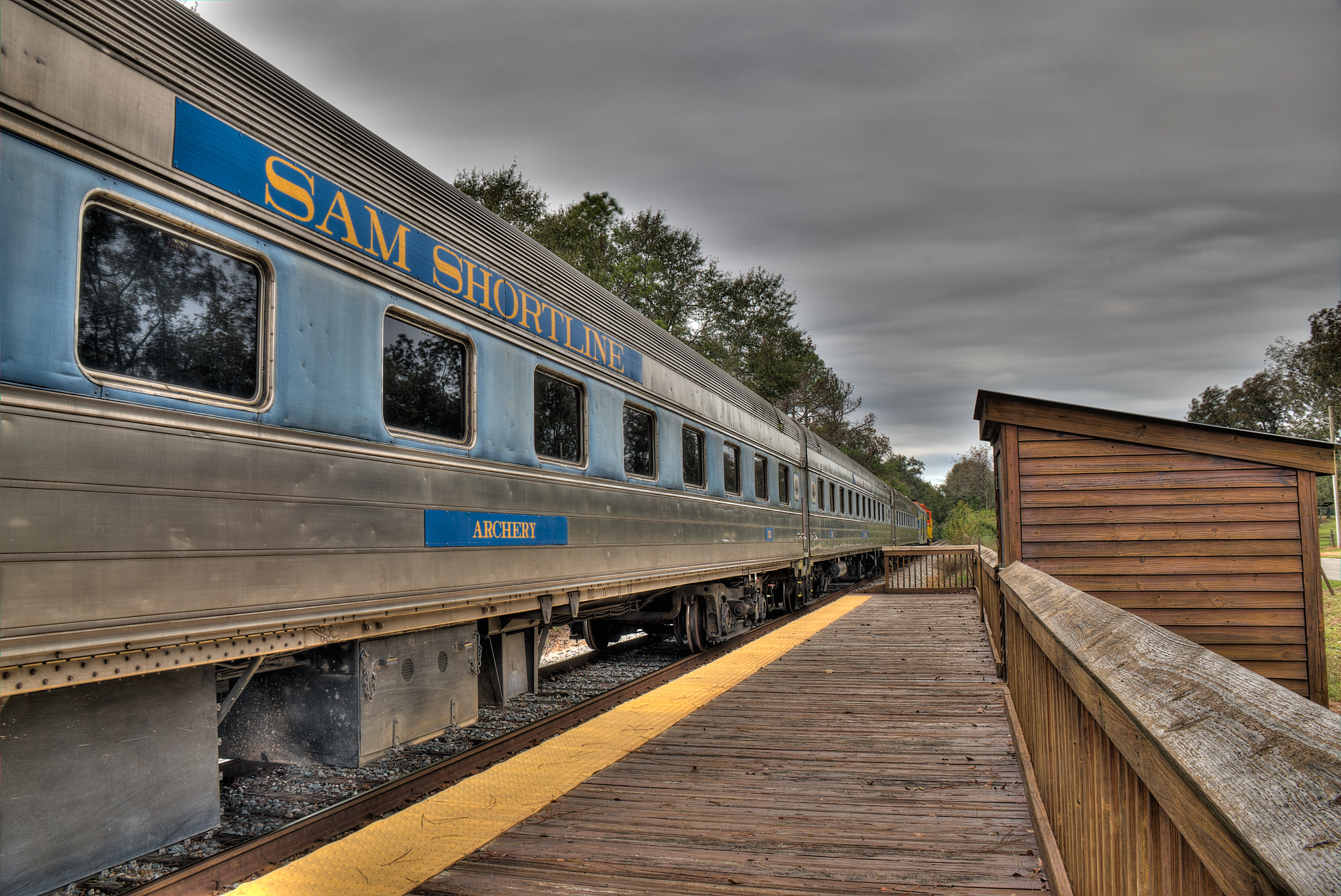
SAM Shortline (named for the Savannah, Americus and Montgomery Railway) at Archery Depot

The former Savannah, Americus and Montgomery Railway from Savannah to Vidalia is currently operated by the Georgia Central Railway, who also operates the former Macon, Dublin and Savannah Railroad.

From Vidalia west to a point near Preston, Georgia is still operated by the Heart of Georgia Railroad. On February 7, 2017, Genesee & Wyoming purchased the Heart of Georgia (who also owns the Georgia Central Railway). The line is still in place from Preston west to Mahrt, Alabama, but that segment is out of service.

The Heart of Georgia Railroad also hosts the SAM Shortline Railroad heritage train of about 45 miles between Archery, Georgia and Cordele. The name SAM Shortline is a reference to the Savannah, Americus and Montgomery Railway. The train is managed by the Southwest Georgia Railroad Excursion Authority with the HOG providing the locomotives and operating crews.

== Historic stations ==
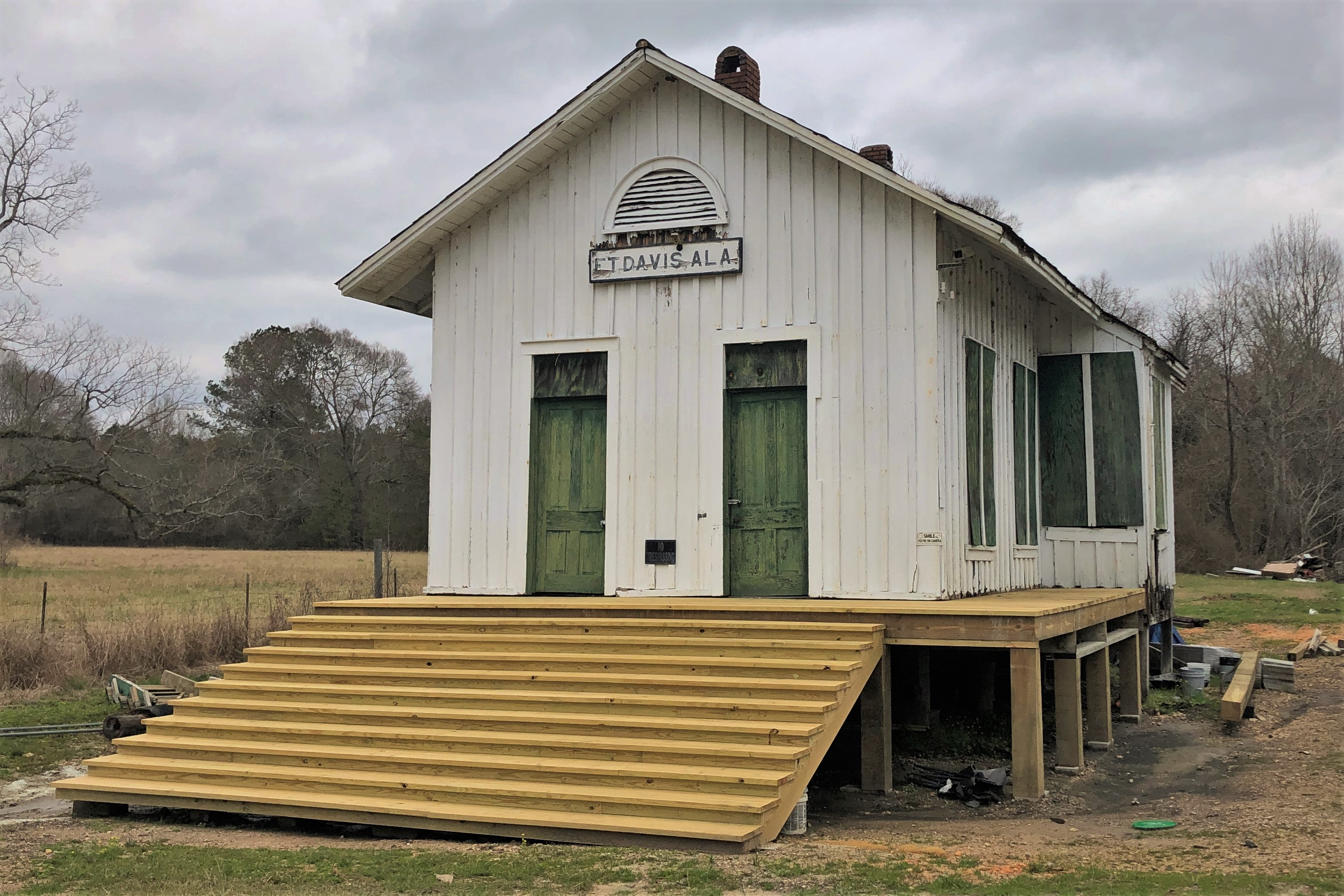
Fort Davis Railroad Depot

State	Milepost	City/Location	Station	Connections and notes
GA	SL 501.6	Savannah	Savannah Union Station	junction with: Florida Central and Peninsular Railroad Northern Division (SAL); Savannah, Florida and Western Railway (ACL); Charleston and Savannah Railroad (SF&W/ACL); Central of Georgia Railway (SOU)
GA	SL 506.2		Williams	
GA	SL 513.8		Meldrim	
GA	SL 520.4		Ellabell	spelled Ellabelle on some timetables
GA	SL 523.5		Lanier	junction with Savannah and Southern Railway
GA	SL 528.5	Pembroke	Pembroke	
GA	SL 531.7		Reka	
GA	SL 535.8		Groveland	
GA	SL 541.2	Daisy	Daisy	
GA	SL 545.4	Claxton	Claxton	junction with Shearwood Railway
GA	SL 547.2	Hagan	Hagan	
GA	SL 549.6	Bellville	Bellville	
GA	SL 552.3	Manassas	Manassas	
GA	SL 557.7	Collins	Collins	junction with: Wadley Southern Railway; Georgia Coast and Piedmont Railroad
GA	SL 559.9		Danton	
GA	SL 564.8		Ohoopee	
GA	SL 571.2	Lyons	Lyons	
GA	SL 575.4		Stacers	
GA	SL 576.8	Vidalia	Vidalia	junction with: Macon, Dublin and Savannah Railroad (SAL); Georgia and Florida Railroad
GA	SL 580.5	Higgston	Higgston	
GA	SL 582.8		McGregor	
GA	SL 586.5	Ailey	Ailey	
GA	SL 588.2	Mount Vernon	Mount Vernon	
GA	SL 591.2		Ochwalkee	
GA	SL 593.1	Glenwood	Glenwood	
GA	SL 595.5		Verbena	
GA	SL 597.4		Stuckey	
GA	SL 600.3	Alamo	Alamo	
GA	SL 604.0		Erick	
GA	SL 609.4	McRae–Helena	McRae Junction	junction with McRae spur
GA	SLD 610.5	McRae–Helena	McRae	located on McRae spur
GA	SL 610.7	McRae–Helena	Helena	junction with Macon and Brunswick Railroad (SOU)
GA	SL 615.3		Aults	
GA	SL 620.9	Milan	Milan	
GA	SL 625.1		Calvin	
GA	SL 629.6	Rhine	Rhine	
GA	SL 632.2		Copeland	
GA	SL 636.1	Abbeville	Abbeville	junction with Abbeville & Waycross Railroad (SAL)
GA	SL 640.8		Kramer	
GA	SL 645.3	Rochelle	Rochelle	junction with Ocilla Southern
GA	SL 648.2		Pine City	
GA	SL 650.4	Pitts	Pitts	junction with Hawkinsville and Florida Southern Railway
GA	SL 654.2		Seville	
GA	SL 655.4		Williford	
GA	SL 657.1		Listonia	
GA	SL 660.2		Penia	
GA	SL 665.2	Cordele	Cordele	junction with: Waycross Air Line Railroad (AB&A/ACL); Georgia Southern and Florida Railway (SOU); Abbeville and Waycross Railroad (SAL)
GA	SL 671.3		Coney	located near Georgia Veterans State Park
GA	SL 675.1		Flintside	
GA	SL 677.8		Cobb	
GA	SL 682.2	DeSoto	DeSoto	
GA	SL 683.6	Leslie	Leslie	
GA	SL 687.0		Parkers	
GA	SL 688.2		Huntington	
GA	SL 691.7		Gatewood	
GA	SL 694.9	Americus	Shops	
GA	SL 695.9	Americus	Americus	junction with Central of Georgia Railway
GA	SL 700.1		New Point	
GA	SL 704.1		Salters	
GA	SL 705.8	Plains	Plains	
GA	SL 708.5		Archery	
GA	SL 712.6		Dumas	
GA	SL 715.9		Preston	
GA	SL 724.1	Richland	Richland	junction with: Georgia Florida and Alabama Railway (SAL); Columbus Southern Railway (SAL)
GA	SL 727.9		Randall	
GA	SL 732.7	Lumpkin	Lumpkin	
GA	SL 737.9		Charles	
GA	SL 740.2		Louvale	
GA	SL 744.0		Union	
GA	SL 751.1		Omaha	
GA	SL 751.6		Omaha Brick Yard	
AL	SL 754.1		Mahrt	junction with Mobile and Girard Railroad
AL	SL 754.5		Cottonton	
AL	SL 756.1		McLendon	
AL	SL 758.1		Hirsch	
AL	SL 761.0		Pittsview	originally Pittsboro
AL	SL 766.8		Hooks	
AL	SL 770.9		Rutherford	
AL	SL 777.7		Hurtsboro	junction with Central of Georgia Railway
AL	SL 784.8		Hannon	
AL	SL 788.7		Roba	
AL	SL 795.6		Fort Davis	
AL	SL 799.8		Downs	
AL	SL 800.5		Burgin	
AL	SL 804.6		Hardaway	
AL	SL 808.9		Chesson	
AL	SL 813.9		Cecil	originally Sledges
AL	SL 815.1		McDade	
AL	SL 820.0		Merry	located in Mount Meigs
AL	SL 825.1		Mitylene	
AL	SL 830.6	Montgomery	Kilby	
AL	SL 834.0	Montgomery	Clisby Park	
AL	SL 834.9	Montgomery	Montgomery Union Station	junction with: Mobile and Montgomery Railroad (L&N); Alabama Midland Railway (SF&W/ACL); Central of Georgia Railway; Gulf, Mobile and Ohio Railroad
