= Abbeville and Waycross Railroad =

Overview
- Locale: Southwest Georgia
- Dates of operation: 1890–Unknown
- Successor: Georgia and Alabama Railroad

Technical
- Track gauge: 4 ft 8 1/2 in (1,435 mm) (standard gauge)

The Abbeville and Waycross Railroad was incorporated in 1889. The company started building a line between Abbeville, Georgia and Fitzgerald, Georgia in 1890 and finished in 1896. A thirteen-mile stretch of track between Abbeville and Bowens Mill was opened in 1890 and in 1891 was extended to Lulaville. In 1896, entrepreneur John Skelton Williams bought the Abbeville and Waycross Railroad and extended it nine miles from Fitzgerald, Georgia to Ocilla, Georgia. Shortly after that, the Abbeville and Waycross Railroad became part of the Georgia and Alabama Railway (which operated the former Savannah, Americus and Montgomery Railway).

In January 1899, John Skelton Williams's syndicate offered to purchase a majority of shares in railroads along the east coast of the United States that would become the Seaboard Air Line Railroad. By 1900, the Georgia and Alabama Railway formally became part of the Seaboard Air Line. John Skelton Williams served as the first president of the Seaboard Air Line, and he would later serve as the United States Comptroller of the Currency. The Abbeville and Waycross Railroad became the Seaboard Air Line's Ocilla Subdivision.

In 1967, the Seaboard Air Line merged with its rival, the Atlantic Coast Line Railroad, and the combined company was named the Seaboard Coast Line Railroad. The tracks from Abbeville to Fitzgerald were abandoned in 1971, but the tracks from Fitzgerald remained in operation until 1990.

== Historic stations ==
Milepost	City/Location	Station	Connections and notes
SLA 636.1	Abbeville	Abbeville	junction with Savannah, Americus and Montgomery Railway (SAL)
SLA 641.8		Browning	
SLA 648.5		Bowens Mill	
SLA 651.9		Queensland	
SLA 653.6		Lulaville	
SLA 658.0	Fitzgerald	Fitzgerald	junction with Atlanta, Birmingham and Coast Railroad (ACL)
SLA 666.8	Ocilla	Ocilla	junction with: Ocilla and Irwinville Railroad; Ocilla and Valdosta Railroad; Fitzgerald, Ocilla, and Broxton Railroad; Ocilla Southern Railroad
