= South Carolina Central Railroad =

Railroad in South Carolina, USA

- South Carolina Central engines in the new Genesee & Wyoming livery

Overview
- Headquarters: Darlington, South Carolina
- Reporting mark: SCRF
- Locale: Northeastern South Carolina
- Dates of operation: 1987–
- Predecessor: CSX Corporation

Technical
- Track gauge: 4 ft 8 ½ in (1,435 mm) (standard gauge)
- Length: 42 miles (68 km)

The South Carolina Central Railroad (reporting mark SCRF) is a class III railroad that operates 42 miles (68 km) of former CSX Transportation trackage in South Carolina. Originally a RailTex subsidiary upon its start in 1987, the railroad passed to RailAmerica following their acquisition of RailTex in 2000 and passed to the Genesee & Wyoming Railroad upon its acquisition of RailAmerica.

Primary commodities include steel, chemicals, trash, and plastics, amounting to about 30,000 carloads in 2008. Interchange is made with CSX at Florence.

== History ==
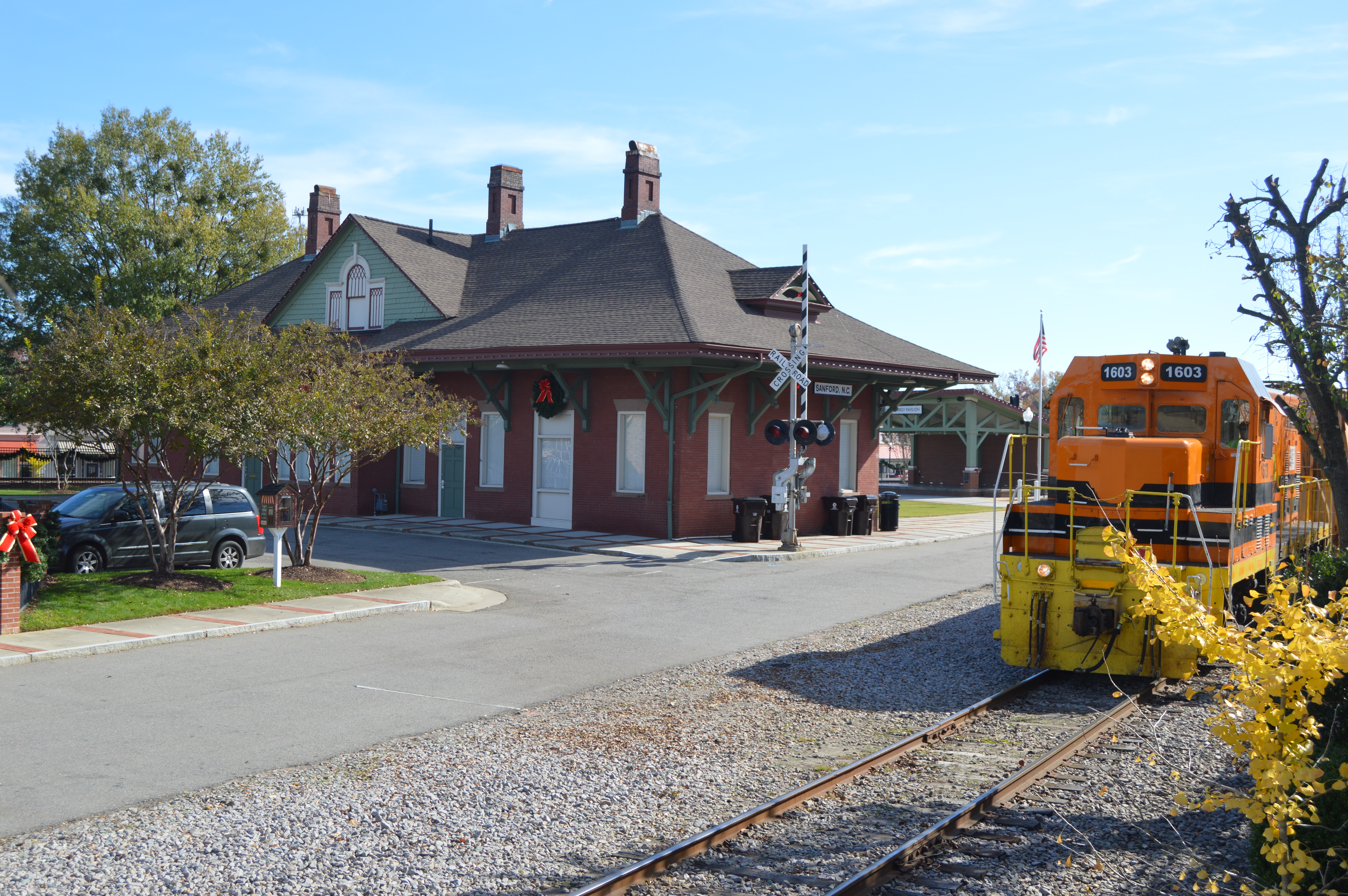
#1603 operating in Sanford, North Carolina

Both routes that comprise the South Carolina Central were of Seaboard Air Line and Atlantic Coast Line heritage. The oldest segment originally ran from Cheraw through Society Hill and Floyd before ending at Florence. It was constructed by the Cheraw and Darlington Railroad prior to the Civil War. The segment connecting Hartsville to Floyd was built by the Hartsville Railroad in 1890 for the purpose of connecting with the Cheraw & Darlington. Both segments were absorbed into the Atlantic Coast Line by 1900.

The rest of the line from Hartsville to Bishopville was part of the Seaboard Air Line before being merged with the Atlantic Coast Line in 1967 to form the Seaboard Coast Line. The SCL became the Seaboard System in 1983 and CSX Transportation in 1986. CSX sold both lines to RailTex subsidiary South Carolina Central railroad on December 1, 1987. This gave the SCC two disconnected tracks, one running from Cheraw to Society Hill, 12 miles (19 km), and a second line from Florence to Bishopville, 42.4 miles (68.2 km).

Initially the South Carolina Central had four separate divisions independent of the operations in northeast South Carolina. The SCC served as a holding company for the Georgia & Alabama, Georgia Southwestern, Carolina Piedmont, and the Georgia Great Southern.

The old South Carolina Central Railroad logo.

The South Carolina Central's parent company RailTex was acquired by RailAmerica in 2000. RailAmerica was itself taken over by Genesee & Wyoming Inc (GWI) in December, 2012. Genesee & Wyoming to Buy RailAmerica for $1.4 Billion.

In 2012 South Carolina Central filed to abandon its line between Cheraw and Society Hill.

== Livery ==
For many years, the livery in use on South Carolina Central trains was an original scheme. It was primarily dark blue with white accents and the featured logo was also unique to the SCCR, featuring the outline of the state of South Carolina, the name of the railroad and a red star marking its location in the state. After it passed to the Genesee & Wyoming, the livery was aligned with that of its other subsidiaries. The new livery is primarily orange with black pinstripes and yellow accents. It features the new SCCR logo, also aligned with other G&W subsidiaries, which is an emblem type logo with the shape of South Carolina in the central and the initials of the railroad on either side.

== Equipment ==
- 5 Locomotives
- 46 Flatcars
- 67 Boxcars
