= Meldrim =

Meldrim may refer to:

- Meldrim, Georgia, United States
- Green-Meldrim House, historical building located in Savannah, Georgia
- Meldrim, Georgia trestle disaster occurred at Meldrim, Georgia on June 28, 1959
- Meldrim Thomson Jr. (1912–2001), Republican who served three terms as Governor of the U.S. state of New Hampshire
- Peter Meldrim, politician, a judge and an army officer from Georgia, USA
