= Heart of Georgia Railroad =

Overview
- Parent company: Genesee and Wyoming
- Headquarters: Americus, Georgia
- Reporting mark: HOG
- Locale: East Central Alabama, Southwest Georgia (United States)
- Dates of operation: 1999–present
- Predecessor: Georgia Southwestern

Technical
- Track gauge: 4 ft 8 1/2 in (1,435 mm) (standard gauge)
- Length: 227 miles (365 km)

Other
- Website: Official website

The Heart of Georgia Railroad (reporting mark HOG) is a shortline railroad created in 1999 to lease and operate 177 miles (285 km) of track owned by the Georgia Department of Transportation between Mahrt, Alabama and Vidalia, Georgia, in the United States. The railroad has since expanded to include around 227 miles (365 km) of track, reaching as far as Midville, Georgia. Initially only the portion from Rochelle to Preston, Georgia was utilized, with the Preston-Mahrt and Rochelle-Vidalia lines out of service. The Heart of Georgia also hosts the SAM passenger excursion train and is owned by parent company Atlantic Western Transportation Company.

Primary commodities include feed products, chemicals, plastic pellets, aggregates, lumber, grain, pulpwood, scrap metal, and fertilizer, amounting to around 7,500 annual carloads.

== History ==
An east–west route from Vidalia to Mahrt forms the core of the Heart of Georgia railroad and was built in segments over a period of several years. The Americus, Preston & Lumpkin was started in 1884 and connected its namesake cities by 1887. Also in 1887 further extension brought the terminus of the railroad further east to Abbeville. In 1888 the railroad became the Savannah, Americus & Montgomery. The railroad continued to grow in 1890, reaching Lyons in the east, as well as the Chattahoochee River, and eventually Montgomery to the west. At Lyons, the SA&M met the newly constructed Savannah & Western. In 1895, the SA&M was reorganized under the Georgia & Alabama and in 1900 the railroad once again changed hands into the Seaboard Air Line.

Through a number of mergers the line eventually came under the ownership of the Seaboard System in 1983, which abandoned the line between Montgomery and Mahrt on April 20, 1986. The remaining line from Mahrt to Rhine, Georgia was sold to the Georgia Southwestern by CSX Transportation on June 5, 1989. Georgia Southwestern ended operations on the line from Preston to Mahrt in 1999, and the state of Georgia sought a new operator for the entire route from Vidalia to Mahrt, part of which was still retained by the Georgia Southwestern. The Heart of Georgia railroad was created in 1999 for the purpose of operating the line on behalf of the state. On May 22, 2000, the state purchased the remaining portion of the line not already under their ownership between Omaha, Georgia and the end of the line across the river in Mahrt as well as an additional 71.13 miles (114.47 km) between Rochelle and Preston retained by the Georgia Southwestern.

On February 19, 2004, the Heart of Georgia expanded its line with the annexation of the Ogeechee Railway between Vidalia and Midville, a distance of 42.4 miles (68.2 km). However, the portion between Midville and a point south of Swainsboro is now operated by the Georgia Southern Railway.

In 2010 ground was broken on an inland port on the Heart of Georgia in Cordele, Georgia. The port is expected to generate significant traffic for the HOG and provide traffic for the restored Rhine-Vidalia route.

On February 7, 2017, national shortline operator Genesee & Wyoming announced that it had purchased the Heart of Georgia, with the deal expected to be finalized later in the year after regulatory approval.

As of 2023, The Heart of Georgia Railroad interchanges at many different locations. It interchanges with CSX in Cordele, Georgia, with Georgia Central Railway in Vidalia, Georgia, with both Southwestern Railroad and Norfolk Southern in Americus, Georgia, and the Georgia Southern Railway in Midville, Georgia. The line is rated for a maximum carload of 263,000 pounds.

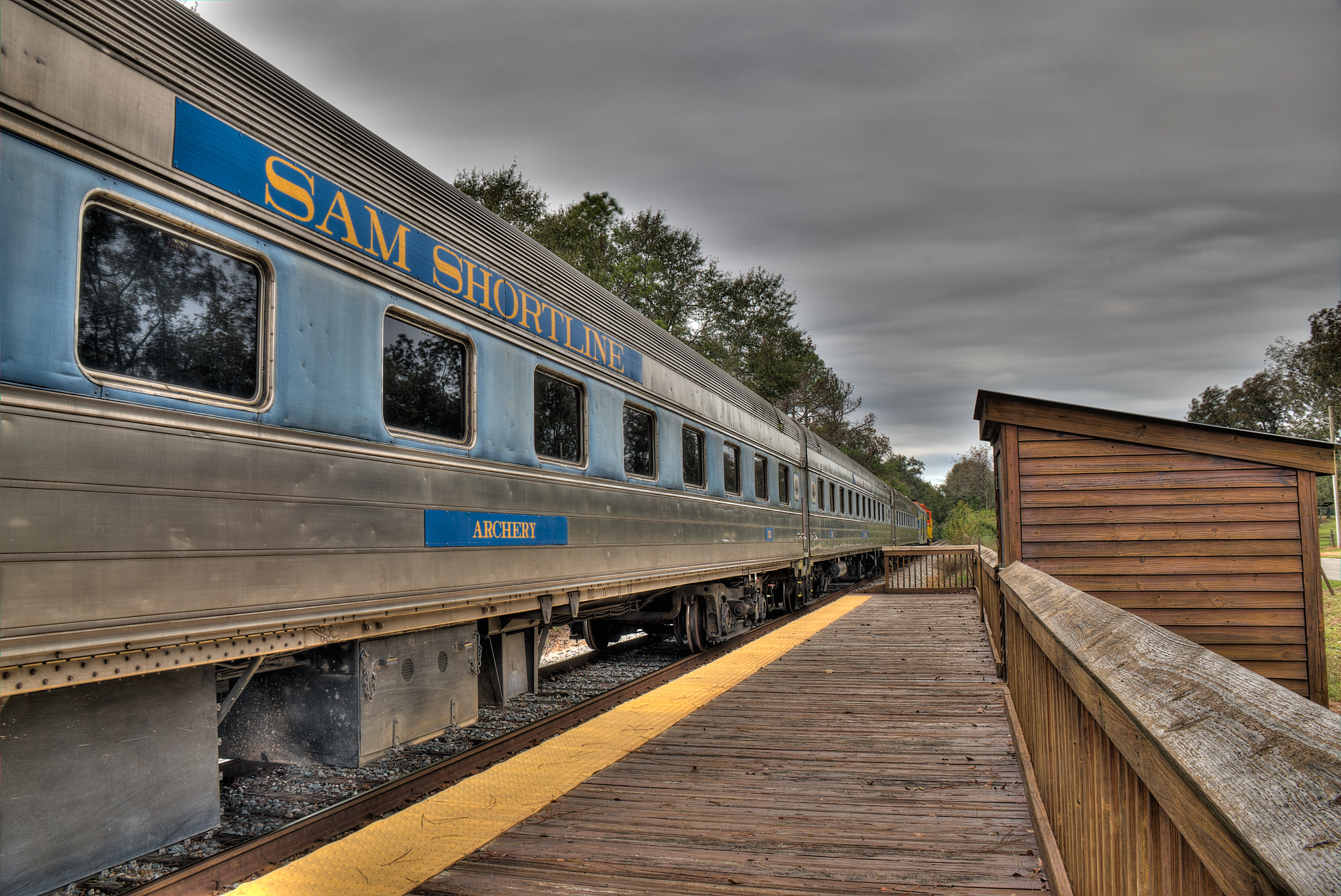
Train at Archery Depot

== SAM Shortline Railway ==
In addition to freight services provided by the Heart of Georgia, the railroad also hosts the SAM Shortline Railroad heritage train of about 45 miles between the unincorporated community of Archery, Georgia and Cordele. The train is managed by the Southwest Georgia Railroad Excursion Authority with the HOG providing the locomotives and operating crews.

== Cordele Intermodal Services ==
In December, 2010 The Heart of Georgia began hosting intermodal transport for Cordele Intermodal Services out of the Cordele Inland Port. Cordele Intermodal Services facilitates container transport between the Georgia Ports Authority in Savannah and the Cordele Rail Ramp. Heart of Georgia Railroad operates the line between Cordele, GA and Vidalia, GA. The Georgia Central Railway operates the rail line between Vidalia and Savannah. Heart of Georgia Railroad has seen significant traffic increases in traffic since Cordele Intermodal Services' inception.
