= Columbus and Chattahoochee Railroad =

Freight railroad in Alabama, US

Overview
- Headquarters: Columbus, Georgia
- Reporting mark: CHH
- Locale: Southeast Alabama
- Dates of operation: 2012–present
- Predecessor: Norfolk Southern

Technical
- Track gauge: 4 ft 8 1/2 in (1,435 mm) (standard gauge)
- Length: 26 miles (42 km)

Columbus and Chattahoochee Railroad (reporting mark CHH) is a 26-mile-long (42 km) freight railroad running from Girard, Alabama, to Mahrt, Alabama, and has shared trackage rights with the Norfolk Southern to use the track between NS Columbus yard in Columbus, Georgia, and Girard, Alabama. This track runs concurrent with 9th St. in downtown Columbus and is shared as part of the designated yard limits for Columbus Yard. CHH interchanges with the Norfolk Southern at Columbus Yard. Locomotives are kept at the yard and crew office for Georgia Southwestern Railroad yard in Columbus. (Sister railroad of the parent company, Genesee & Wyoming)

Genesee & Wyoming, Inc. acquired this railroad in 2012 from the Norfolk Southern as part of an operations agreement for the daily switching operations of the WestRock paper mill in Mahrt.

The Columbus and Chattahoochee has two trains daily that work the line, as well as a 24-hour rotation of crews maintaining the Marshalling yard in Mahrt for the paper mill.

- The Mahrt Turn starts in Columbus, hauling a train bound for the papermill at Mahrt. The train swaps off consists in Mahrt for the return trip back to Columbus.
- The Brickyard job begins by switching customers on the Georgia Southwestern in Columbus and then interchanges with Norfolk Southern on the GSWR Cusseta Branch between 7th Street and 10th Avenue. Once those duties are completed, the power goes into the NS Columbus Yard and accepts interchange for the CHH to work the customers on the Alabama State Docks Lead and the Brickyard on CHH tracks.

Commodities handled by the Columbus and Chattahoochee Railroad include paper products, lumber, slurry, pigment, fuel oil, carbon black, aggregate minerals, scrap iron and bricks.

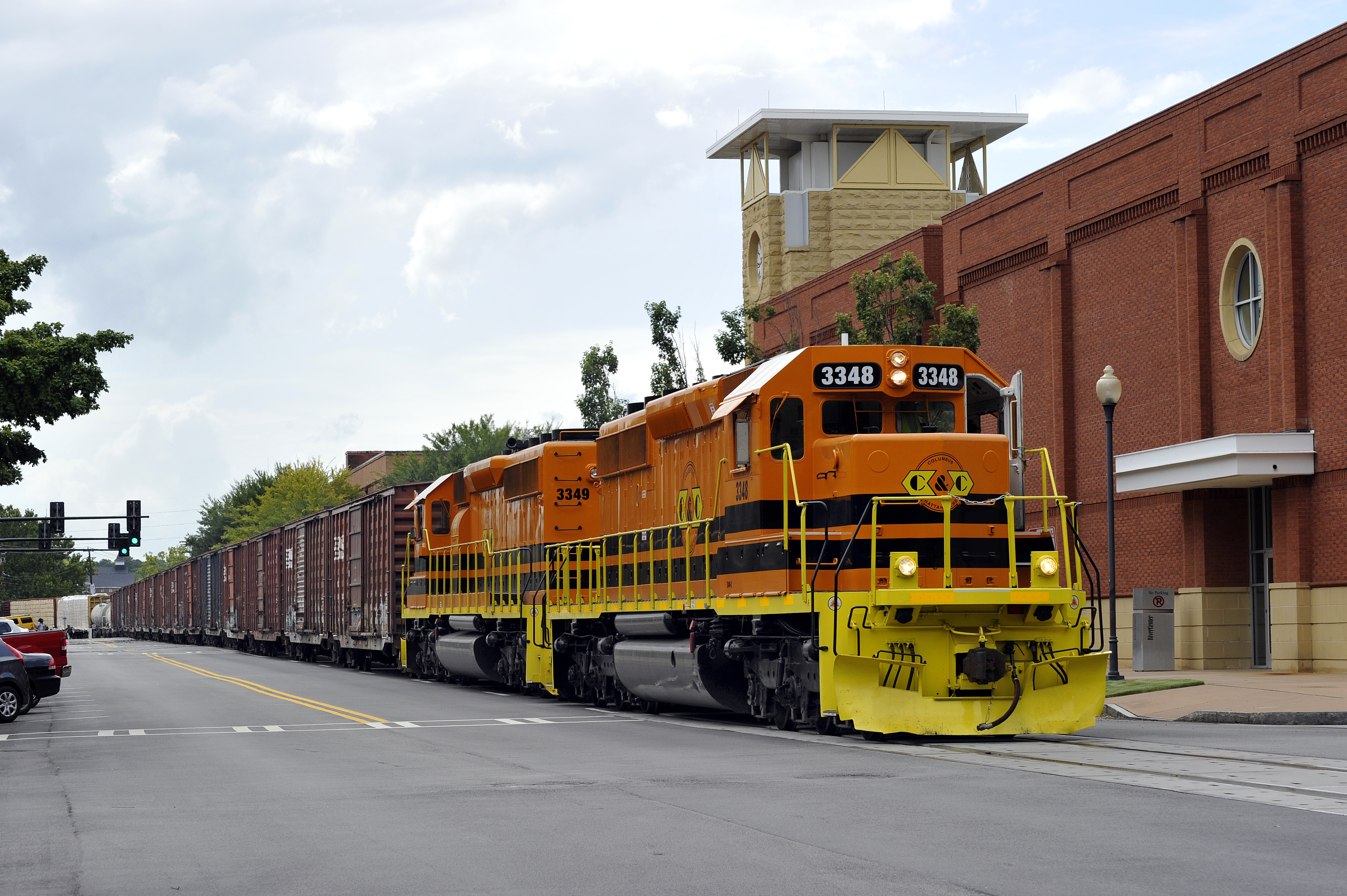
CCH 3348 Broadway9thst 2254

Originally, there were only two locomotives on the roster for Columbus and Chattahoochee Railroad, the CHH 3348 and 3349. (EMD SD40-2s) The other 4-axle power provided were rostered to other G&W companies and have been rotated between sister companies as the demand allows.
