= Nina Mack Garner Lester =

American newspaper executive

- Born: Nina Marie Garner; October 16, 1922; Fort Davis, Alabama
- Died: January 16, 2016 (aged 93); Las Vegas, Nevada
- Education: Wayne State University, Detroit, Michigan
- Occupation: Newspaper Executive
- Years active: 60
- Known for: The first woman to serve as general manager of a major weekly newspaper in the United States (The Pittsburgh Courier). The first African American hired by Ford Motor Company to write for their internal Ford World newspaper.

Nina Mack Garner Lester (October 16, 1922 – January 15, 2016) was an American newspaper executive, journalist, business administrator, and civic leader. She served as general manager of the Detroit edition of the Pittsburgh Courier, one of the nation’s most influential African-American newspapers, and with the largest circulation of any news weekly in the entire country. She has been credited as the first African American woman to serve as general manager of a major weekly newspaper in the United States.

== Early life and education ==
Nina Marie Garner was born on October 16, 1922, in Fort Davis, Alabama, to Jim Garner and Carrie Belle Thompson. She was raised primarily in Blairsville, Pennsylvania, by her aunt, Pearl A. Peoples. She attended local public schools there before enrolling at Wayne State University in Detroit, Michigan. She was active in church from an early age, serving as an organist, choir member, and later as a deaconess.

== Career ==
Following graduation from Wayne State University, Lester began her newspaper career as a secretary with the Detroit office of the Pittsburgh Courier. After several years devoted to raising her family, she returned to the newspaper, where she advanced through the administrative ranks. She was eventually appointed general manager of the Detroit edition of the Pittsburgh Courier, originally founded in 1907, becoming one of the highest-ranking women in the Black Press. Contemporary accounts and later historical recollections have credited her as the first African American woman—and possibly the first woman ever—to serve as general manager of a major American weekly newspaper.

The city of Detroit was also home to the Michigan Chronicle weekly newspaper, likewise serving communities of color throughout the U.S. It had been established in 1936 by John H. Sengstacke, and Louis E. Martin, as editor. Martin would later serve as White House advisor to three Presidents of the United States, having joined the campaign of then Senator John F. Kennedy in 1960. As general manager, Nina Lester oversaw business operations, advertising, circulation, and community relations during an era in which the Courier remained an influential voice for civil rights, African-American political participation, and Black business development.

Following her tenure with the ‘‘Courier’’, she was hired by Ford Motor Company to write for their internal ‘‘Ford Motor World’’ newspaper, while at the same time assisting professional photographer, and future husband, Eugene Lester, in his commercial photography business. She also worked in retail management, and later wrote obituaries for Thompson Funeral Home in Detroit for some fifteen years.

== Civic and community service ==
Lester devoted decades to civic service in metropolitan Detroit. She participated in numerous community, religious, and charitable organizations and was active in Plymouth United Church of Christ for more than sixty years. In recognition of her civic leadership and professional accomplishments, she received an honorary doctorate in the humanities from Wayne State University in Detroit.

== Personal life ==
She married Albert Eggleston Mack in 1949, and the couple had four children. She later married photographer Eugene Lester.

== Legacy ==
Lester’s career reflected the expanding leadership opportunities for African American women within the Black Press during the mid-twentieth century. Her advancement from secretary to general manager illustrated the increasing role women played in managing major Black-owned newspapers during the Civil Rights era. Nina Mack Garner Lester died on January 15, 2016, in Las Vegas, Nevada, at the age of 93.

== Honorary degrees ==
Doctor of Humane Letters, Wayne State University, Detroit, Michigan.
