= GSWR =

GSWR can refer to one of two former railway companies in the British Isles:

- Glasgow and South Western Railway of Scotland (often "G&SWR")
- Great Southern and Western Railway of Ireland (often "GS&WR")

It can also refer to the Georgia Southwestern Railroad.
