= William Decker Johnson (bishop) =

American bishop (1869–1936)

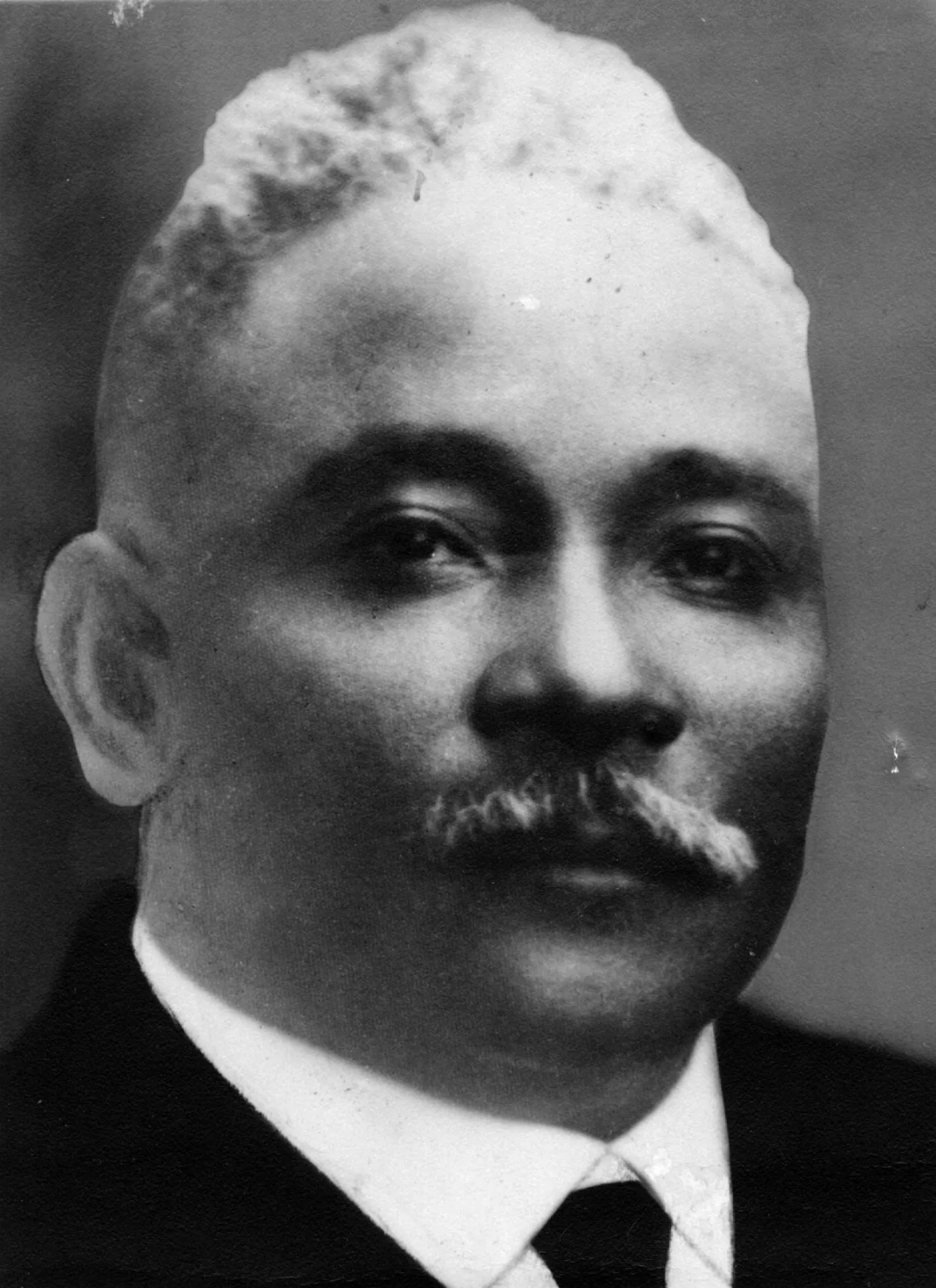
- Born: November 15, 1869; Glasgow, Georgia, U.S.
- Died: June 17, 1936 (aged 66); Archery, Georgia, U.S.
- Burial place: Saint Mark AME Church Cemetery, Archery, Georgia, U.S.
- Occupations: Bishop, educator
- Spouse: Winifred Elmira Simon (m. 1891– )
- Children: 11

William Decker "W. D." Johnson (November 15, 1869 – June 17, 1936) was an American Bishop and educator. He was the 42nd Bishop of the African Methodist Episcopal (AME) Church, the founder of the community of Archery, Georgia, and the founder of Johnson Home Industrial College (1912–1936) in Archery.

== Early life and family ==
William Decker Johnson was born on November 15, 1869, in the unincorporated community of Glasgow in Thomas County, Georgia, to parents Mattie McCullough and Rev. Andrew Jackson Johnson. Both of his parents were African American and had been enslaved, and both were members of the African Methodist Episcopal Church in southern Georgia state. Johnson’s father died in 1883 when he was 14 years old, followed by the death of his youngest brother, and his mother in 1887. Johnson was granted a first grade certificate at age 14, and started teaching in Ware County, Georgia, to help financially support his family. By age 18, Johnson decided he wanted to be a preacher.

He married Winifred Elmira Simon in 1891, and together they had 11 children.

== Career ==
He started his career in April 1887, Johnson was licensed to exhort by Rev. W. H. Powell in Waycross, Georgia; followed by a license to preach by October 1887 by Rev. J. B. Lofton. In 1889, Johnson was assigned to his first church, the Westonia Mission in Georgia by Rev. W. O. P. Sherman. "Johnson was the Supreme Archer and organizer of the Sublime Order of Archery." In 1893, Johnson was an Elder, and by 1900 rose to Presiding Elder of the Bainbridge District in central Georgia.

In 1904, a Doctor of Divinity degree was conferred to Johnson by Morris Brown College in Atlanta.

Johnson moved to Archery, Georgia, and in 1912 he established the Johnson Home Industrial College which offered primary, secondary, collegiate, and vocational classes to local Black students. The community of Archery is located a few miles from Plains, Georgia, where President Jimmy Carter was born in 1924 and raised. Carter knew of Johnson and his family when he was a child.

In 1920, Johnson was elevated to bishopric in St. Louis, the 42nd Bishop of the AME Church. He was a Bishop in the AME Church for five Midwestern states. At times his jurisdiction covered California, Idaho, Montana, Nevada, Oklahoma, Oregon, Texas, parts of Mexico and parts of British Columbia.

In the 1920s, Johnson was part of a delegation of AME Bishops received at the White House by President Calvin Coolidge, they discussed Mississippi river flood control. Johnson delivered a memorial service sermon in 1924 for the late Isaiah T. Montgomery, founder of Mound Bayou, Mississippi.

== Death and legacy ==
Johnson died on June 17, 1936, in his home in Archery, and is buried at the Saint Mark AME Church Cemetery in Archery.

He is the namesake of William Decker Johnson Hall (built 1923) at 1020 Elm Avenue in Waco, Texas, formerly part of the Paul Quinn College campus and designed by prominent Black architect William Sidney Pittman. The William Decker Johnson Hall has been listed on the National Register of Historic Places since March 3, 2025; and it has been listed as a Waco Historical Landmark since 2022.

In 1999, a historical marker was erected about Johnson and President Jimmy Carter near Plains, Georgia.

== Publications ==
- Johnson, Rev. W. D. (1897). Past and Future of the Negro Race in America. Everett, MA: C.A. Wasto.
