= Atlantic and Gulf Railroad =

Atlantic and Gulf Railroad may refer to:

- Atlantic and Gulf Railroad (1856–79), predecessor of the Atlantic Coast Line Railroad
- Atlantic and Gulf Railroad (1991–99), Gulf and Ohio Railways subsidiary
