= Georgia Great Southern Railroad =

Overview
- Headquarters: Dawson, Georgia
- Reporting mark: GGS
- Locale: Southwest Georgia
- Dates of operation: 1990–1995
- Predecessor: CSX Transportation
- Successor: Georgia Southwestern

Technical
- Track gauge: 4 ft 8 1/2 in (1,435 mm) (standard gauge)
- Length: 24.2 miles (38.9 km)

The Georgia Great Southern Railroad (reporting mark GGS) was a shortline railroad formerly operating between Dawson and Albany, Georgia, 24.2 miles (38.9 km). The railroad was partially abandoned in 1994. RailTex consolidated its holdings in the area into the Georgia Southwestern in 1995, and the Georgia Great Southern ceased to exist as a separate railroad.

== History ==
The Chattahoochee Brick Company built a line out of Columbus, Georgia and was known as the Columbus Southern Railway when it opened its line to Albany, Georgia in 1890. The railroad was absorbed by the Georgia & Alabama Railway in 1896 and later merged into the Seaboard Air Line in 1902. The Seaboard Air Line merged into the Seaboard Coast Line in 1967, the SCL was merged into the Seaboard System in 1983 and became CSX Transportation in 1986.

CSX put the route from Albany to Dawson out of service due to a lack of traffic over the line. RailTex made an offer on the line and on December 14, 1990 the Georgia Great Southern was created as a division of the South Carolina Central Railroad to operate the new acquisition. However, day-to-day operation of the railroad was actually incorporated with a fellow South Carolina Central division, the Georgia & Alabama. The GGS rostered a single locomotive, a rebuilt GP7u numbered 2130.

The Georgia Great Southern served as a vital link between the RailTex subsidiaries in the area and Gulf & Ohio subsidiary Atlantic & Gulf at Albany. As such, most carloads were simply bridge traffic between Norfolk Southern and the Atlantic & Gulf at Albany to the Georgia & Alabama at Dawson. Traffic patterns changed again in 1994 as the railroad ceased operations over the entire line. The Georgia Great Southern division became redundant following acquisition of trackage rights over Norfolk Southern into Albany in 1995.

Although out of service the railroad was merged into the Georgia Southwestern Railroad in 1995.
