= William Barret Ridgely =

William Ridgely
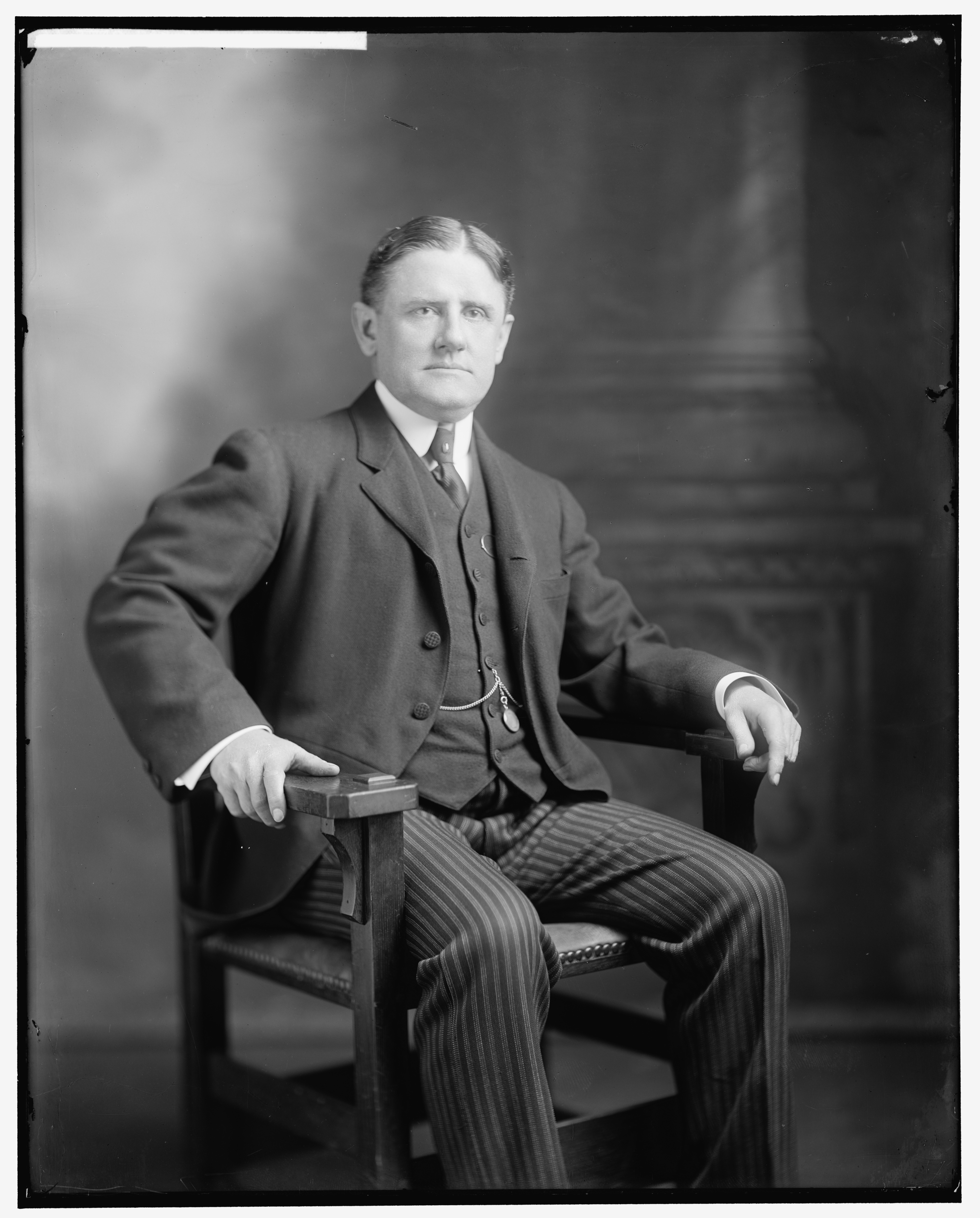

11th Comptroller of the Currency
- In office October 1, 1901 - March 28, 1908
- President: Theodore Roosevelt
- Preceded by: Charles G. Dawes
- Succeeded by: Lawrence O. Murray

Personal details
- Born: July 19, 1858; Springfield, Illinois
- Died: April 30, 1920 (aged 61); Washington, D.C.
- Education: Rensselaer Polytechnic Institute
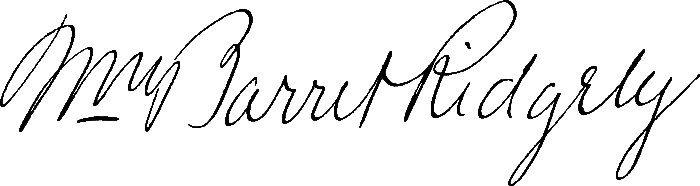
- Signature

William Barret Ridgely (July 19, 1858 – April 30, 1920) was a United States Comptroller of the Currency from 1901 to 1908.

== Biography ==
William B. Ridgely attended Rensselaer Polytechnic Institute, where he was a member of the Chi Phi fraternity. Upon his graduation from RPI in 1881, Ridgely engaged in mining, manufacturing, and banking in Illinois before President Theodore Roosevelt named him Comptroller in 1901. During his term, Congress passed legislation extending the corporate existence of the national banks for the second time. Ridgely resigned as Comptroller to accept the presidency of a national bank in Missouri, which had failed the previous year and was reorganized under his leadership. In 1909, he returned to private business in the Eastern states.

Ridgely died in Washington, D.C., on April 30, 1920.
