= Albany, Florida and Northern Railway =

1889-built railway in Georgia

Overview
- Locale: Georgia
- Dates of operation: 1889–1895

Technical
- Track gauge: 4 ft 8 1/2 in (1,435 mm) standard gauge

The Albany, Florida and Northern Railway (AF&N) was chartered in 1889 and built a railway between Albany and Cordele, Georgia, beginning operation in 1891. The following year the line was leased to the Savannah, Americus and Montgomery Railway (SA&M), who was responsible for obtaining the charter to begin with.

When the SA&M entered receivership in 1892 and was sold under foreclosure in 1895, the AF&N was spun off as a separate independent company, the Albany and Northern Railway.
