= Georgia Southwestern Railroad =

U.S. Class III short line railroad company

Overview
- Headquarters: Dawson, Georgia
- Reporting mark: GSWR
- Locale: Southwest Georgia, Southeast Alabama
- Dates of operation: 1989–

Technical
- Track gauge: 4 ft 8 1/2 in (1,435 mm) (standard gauge)
- Length: 212 miles (341 km)

Other
- Website: Official website

The Georgia Southwestern Railroad (reporting mark GSWR) is a Class III short line railroad company that operates over 212 miles (341 km) of track in southwestern Georgia and southeastern Alabama. Beginning in 1989 as a division of the South Carolina Central Railroad on a pair of former CSX Transportation lines, the railroad has since undergone a number of transformations through abandonments and acquisitions, before arriving at its current form. The railroad was formerly a RailAmerica property before going independent, and in 2008 it was acquired by Genesee & Wyoming Inc.

Traffic includes chemicals, clay, grain, peanuts, plastics, stone, and wood, generating around 13,000 annual carloads.

== History ==
Upon its creation in 1989 as a division of the South Carolina Central Railroad, the Georgia Southwestern railroad operated over two lines making junction at Richland. The first ran 130.7 miles (210.3 km) from Rhine west through Richland and Omaha, Georgia before crossing over the Chattahoochee River and terminating at Mahrt, Alabama. A second line originated at Columbus, and traveled south through Cusseta and Richland, before ending at Bainbridge, Georgia, 127.9 miles (205.8 km). Both routes were sold by CSX on July 5, 1989.

=== Original system ===
The original network consisted of only two lines (described below) containing 258.6 miles (416.2 km) of track. Commodities included forest products, aggregates, chemicals, fertilizer, peanuts, and paper, generating about 9,000 annual carloads. The railroad maintained its headquarters at Americus.

==== Rhine – Mahrt ====
The east–west route from Rhine to Mahrt was built in different segments over a period of several years. The Americus, Preston & Lumpkin was started in 1884 and connected its namesake cities by 1887. In 1887, further extension brought the terminus of the railroad further east to Abbeville, and in 1888, the railroad became the Savannah, Americus & Montgomery. The railroad continued to grow in 1890, reaching Lyons in the east, as well as the Chattahoochee River and eventually Montgomery to the west. In 1895, the SA&M was reorganized under the Georgia & Alabama and in 1900, the railroad once again changed hands into the Seaboard Air Line.

Through a number of mergers, the line eventually came under the ownership of the Seaboard System in 1983, which abandoned the line between Montgomery and Mahrt on April 20, 1986. The remaining line from Mahrt to Rhine, Georgia was sold to the Georgia Southwestern by CSX Transportation in 1989. After operations on the line from Preston to Mahrt ended in 1999 the state of Georgia acquired the segment and sought a new operator for the line. On May 22, 2000, the state purchased the remaining portion of the line not already under their ownership between Omaha and the end of the line across the river in Mahrt as well as an additional 71.13 miles (114.47 km) between Rochelle and Preston retained by the Georgia Southwestern.

The Heart of Georgia took over operations of the line from the Georgia Southwestern in 2000 and still operates from Rhine to Preston, with the segment between Preston and Mahrt out of service.

==== Columbus – Bainbridge ====
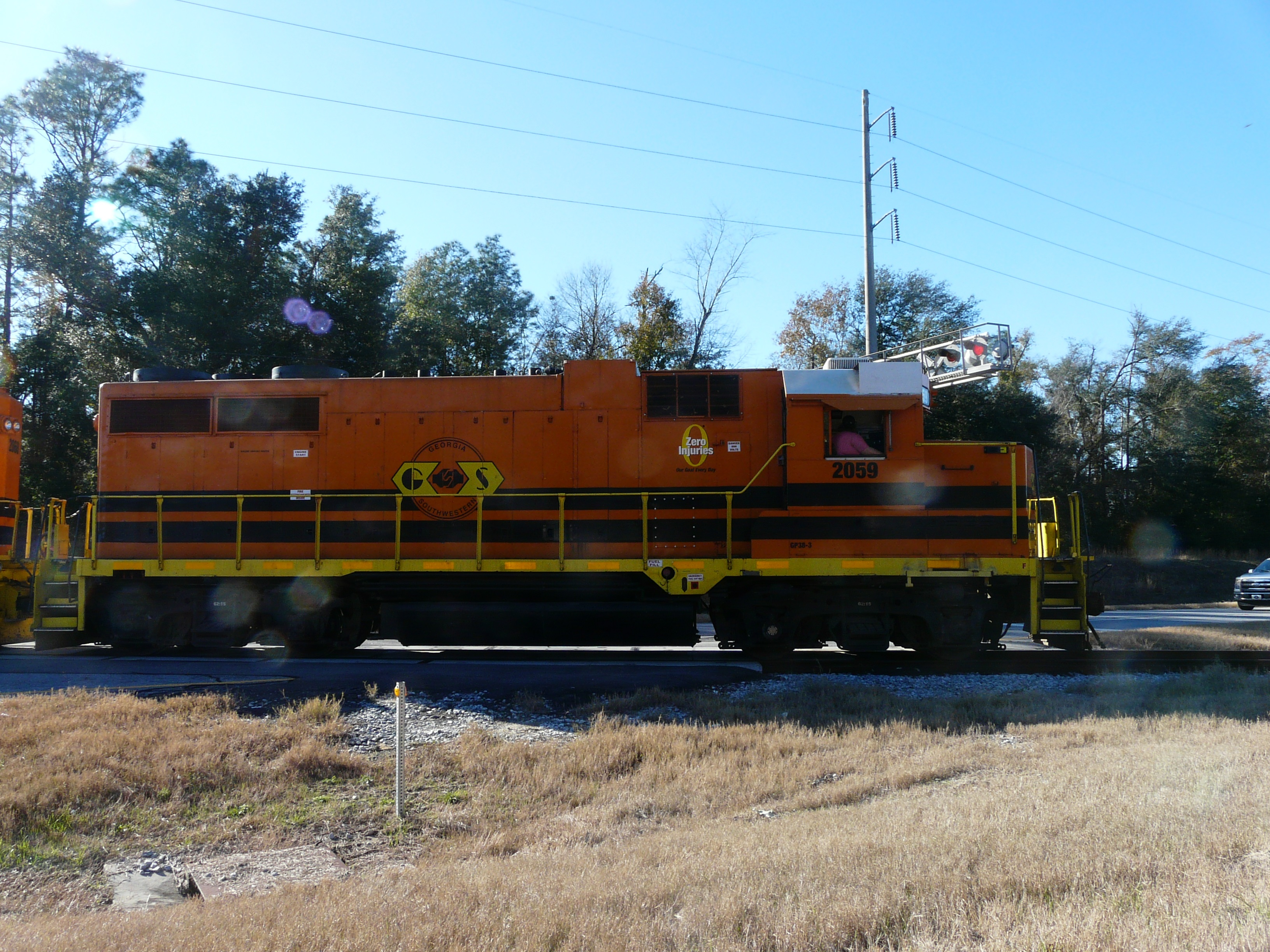
GSWR 2059 crosses U.S. 27 north of Bainbridge, Georgia in 2021

A second line out of Columbus to Bainbridge was originally built by two separate railroads. The first began out of Columbus and was constructed by the Chattahoochee Brick Company, and known as the Columbus Southern Railway when it opened its line to Albany, Georgia in 1890. The railroad was absorbed by the Georgia & Alabama Railway in 1896, and later merged into the Seaboard Air Line in 1902. The second portion of the line was built by the Georgia Pine Railway (Georgia Florida and Alabama Railroad after 1901) - and made junction with the Seaboard Air Line at Richland in 1910. In January 1928, the SAL leased the GF&A, creating a shortcut for trains destined for Florida.

The Seaboard Air Line was later merged into the Seaboard Coast Line in 1967, and the SCL became the Seaboard System in 1983. CSX sold the line from Columbus to Lynn to the Georgia Southwestern in 1989, concurrently with the sale of the Rhine - Mahrt route. Initially, the GSWR exercised trackage rights over CSX to reach Bainbridge, including additional rights to Saffold, Georgia to interchange with the Chattahoochee Industrial Railroad.

1995 brought numerous changes to the Georgia Southwestern network, and the portion of the route from Cusseta to Cuthbert became redundant and was subsequently abandoned in that year, with the rails being removed in September 1997. Rails remained in place from Columbus to Cusseta in order to serve a large pulpwood yard near the latter.

In 2002, the Georgia DOT acquired the remaining disconnected segments of the Columbus - Bainbridge line between Columbus and Cusseta, as well as Cuthbert to Bainbridge. The Georgia Southwestern remained as the operator of the line.

=== Expansion and mergers ===
In the mid-1990s, the Georgia Southwestern experienced a number of changes. Among these changes were the acquisition of Norfolk Southern tracks between Columbus and Americus (now abandoned), as well as trackage rights over NS to Albany. Additionally, two sister South Carolina Central Railroad divisions operating nearby were merged into Georgia Southwestern during the same period.

==== Rochelle – Vidalia ====
In 1990, CSX sold the remaining section of its original Savannah - Montgomery route between Savannah and Vidalia to Georgia Central Railway. This left an unused section between Vidalia and the east end of the Georgia Southwestern at Rochelle. In 1994, the GSWR abandoned the segment between Rochelle and Rhine. In 1995, the Georgia DOT purchased the 51 miles (82 km) route from Vidalia to Rhine for $1.73 million, and in 1996, the previously abandoned Rochelle - Rhine route was acquired for $702,500. Georgia Southwestern approached the GDOT about reviving the route. The first stage of repair work was carried out in 1998, and the inaugural train ran on January 9, 1999.

==== Georgia & Alabama Division ====
The Georgia & Alabama had been operating its route from Smithville, Georgia through Eufaula, Alabama to White Oak, Alabama since June 1, 1989, under the Thoroughbred Shortline Program. This South Carolina Central division crossed the Georgia Southwestern at Cuthbert. In 1995, the Georgia & Alabama was merged into the Georgia Southwestern.

In 2006, the Georgia Southwestern purchased from Norfolk Southern, the entire 79 miles (127 km) of track from Smithville to White Oak that had been leased up until that point. The following year the GSWR abandoned the 4.54 miles (7.31 km) from Eufaula to White Oak.

==== Georgia Great Southern Division ====
Another South Carolina Central division, the Georgia Great Southern Railroad, operated from Dawson, Georgia to Albany, 22 miles (35 km). CSX sold the line to the SCC on December 14, 1990. The GGS ceased operations in 1994. In 1995 trackage rights over Norfolk Southern into Albany made this line excess, as a result part of it was abandoned between Albany and Sasser and the remainder was merged into the Georgia Southwestern.

The 2002 purchase of the remaining line from Dawson to Sasser by the Georgia DOT was included with the sale of the Cuthbert - Bainbridge as well as the Columbus - Cusseta routes.

==== Ochille – Americus ====
Norfolk Southern suffered from a pair of large tropic storms in the mid-90s, losing services over the Ochille - Americus "O" line. After restoring the railroad to operating conditions NS chose to mothball the line, as the two through freight trains that regularly operated over the line had been re-routed. In August 1995, the Georgia Southwestern purchased the former Central of Georgia line and acquired trackage rights from BV&E Junction (Americus) to Albany in order to access the rest of the GSWR network in Smithville.

=== Further expansion ===
Only one additional acquisition was made by the Georgia Southwestern, which was the line from a quarry north of Columbus to Allie, purchased from Norfolk Southern in 2005. The GSWR built a new locomotive shop at Dawson, and moved its offices from Smithville to Sasser during the same period.

==== Columbus – Greenville ====
Originally started in 1871 by the North and South Railroad of Georgia, the line was constructed out of Columbus towards Rome. The fledgling railroad was reorganized as the Columbus and Rome Railroad in 1874, after laying only 20 miles (32 km) of track. Further expansion brought the railroad to Greenville in 1885. A few years later, the railroad was absorbed by the Savannah and Western Railroad, a subsidiary of the Central of Georgia Railroad, and formally merged into the CofG network in 1895.

In 2005 the Georgia Southwestern sought to purchase 43 miles (69 km) of track from Norfolk Southern, between a point north of Columbus to Allie (known as the "R" line), along with an additional 12.2 miles (19.6 km) of trackage rights to the GSWR yard in Columbus.

The line was abandoned in 2007.

== Georgia Southwestern becomes independent ==
GSWR parent company RailTex was sold to RailAmerica effective February 4, 2000. Additional ownership change came in 2002 as RailAmerica passed the railroad to local interests concurrent with the sale of several lines to the Georgia DOT, with the now independent Georgia Southwestern remaining as operator. Traffic on the GSWR grew from 8,600 carloads in 2002 to 13,000 in 2007.

In 2008, the Georgia Southwestern network consisted of the Ochille - Americus line, the Smithville - Eufaula route, and operation on behalf of the Georgia DOT between Dawson - Sasser, Columbus - Cusseta, and Cuthbert - Bainbridge. Additionally trackage rights remained over Norfolk Southern between BV&E Junction near Americus south to Albany and over CSX between Bainbridge and Saffold.

== Acquisition by Genesse & Wyoming ==
Genesse & Wyoming Inc. purchased the Georgia Southwestern outright in December 2008.
