= Georgia Southwestern and Gulf Railroad =

The Georgia Southwestern and Gulf Railroad was incorporated in 1906 and began operations in 1910 on about 35 miles (56 km) of track leased from the Albany and Northern Railway between Cordele and Albany, Georgia, USA. The GS&G was purchased by the Georgia Northern Railway in 1939, and in 1942 operations were returned to the Albany and Northern.
