= Orland, Georgia =

Orland
- Unincorporated community
- Location within the state of Georgia Orland (the United States)
- Coordinates: 32°26′01″N 82°40′20″W
- Country: United States
- State: Georgia
- County: Treutlen
- Elevation: 279 ft (85 m)
- Time zone: UTC-5 (Eastern (EST))
  - Summer (DST): UTC-4 (EDT)
- GNIS feature ID: 332581

Orland is an unincorporated community in Treutlen County, in the U.S. state of Georgia.

== History ==
A post office called Orland was established in 1902 and remained operational until 1933.

The Georgia General Assembly incorporated Orland as a town in 1908. The town's municipal charter was dissolved in 1915. The Macon, Dublin and Savannah Railroad once had a station in Orland as part of their Macon Subdivision.

On April 15, 2007, a tornado struck Orland.
