= Atlantic and Gulf Railroad (1991–1999) =

Overview
- Headquarters: Albany, Georgia
- Reporting mark: AGLF
- Locale: Southwest Georgia
- Dates of operation: 1991–1999
- Predecessor: CSX Transportation
- Successor: Georgia and Florida RailNet

Technical
- Track gauge: 4 ft 8 1/2 in (1,435 mm) (standard gauge)
- Length: 77 miles (124 km)

The Atlantic and Gulf Railroad (reporting mark AGLF) was a shortline railroad that previously operated 77 miles (124 km) of track between Thomasville and Sylvester, Georgia, via Albany. The Atlantic & Gulf was created in 1991 from former CSX tracks and currently exists as part of the Georgia & Florida Railway, a subsidiary of OmniTRAX.

== History ==
The Atlantic and Gulf consisted of two separate lines out of Albany. The route from Thomasville to Albany was originally built by the South Georgia and Florida Railroad and completed in June 1870. The SG&F later became part of the original Atlantic and Gulf Railroad, and the Savannah, Florida and Western by 1879. After 1882 the SF&W was simply known as the Plant System.

A second line ran from Albany to Sylvester, and was built by the Brunswick and Albany in 1872. By 1901 the railroad was part of the Savannah, Florida and Western. Both lines ended up under the Atlantic Coast Line umbrella in 1902, and through a number of mergers became part of CSX by 1986.

CSX sold both routes to Gulf and Ohio Railways subsidiary Atlantic and Gulf and service began February 15, 1991. Interchange was made with CSX at Thomasville, Norfolk Southern at Albany, the Georgia Great Southern at Albany until 1994, and the Georgia Southwestern at Albany after 1994. Commodities included coal, paper, grain, peanut oil, tires, forest products, and aggregates, which generated about 12,000 carloads in 1991.

On April 30, 1999, the Atlantic and Gulf was sold by Gulf and Ohio to North American RailNet subsidiary Georgia and Florida RailNet along with an adjacent Gulf & Ohio property, the Georgia and Florida.
