= Georgia Northern Railway =

The Boston and Albany Railroad was chartered in 1891 to build a rail line from Boston, Georgia to Albany, Georgia, United States. After two years, very little progress had been made and the railroad was purchased by the Pidcock Family who had founded a private logging railroad in the early 1890s that ran north from Pidcock, Georgia.

The Pidcocks combined their assets into the Georgia Northern Railway. The railroad was operating between Albany and Boston by 1905. They then began purchasing other railroads. It bought the Flint River and Northeastern Railroad in 1910, the Georgia, Ashburn, Sylvester and Camilla Railway in 1922, and the Georgia Southwestern and Gulf Railroad in 1939. The coterie of roads became known as the Pidcock Kingdom shortlines in Sowega.

The Southern Railway took over the Georgia Northern in 1966, fully merging it with the Albany and Northern Railway and the GAS&C (apparently included in the GN purchase) in 1972, but maintaining the GN name for the subsidiary. It was eventually merged into the Georgia Southern and Florida Railway on December 31, 1993.
