= Flint River and Northeastern Railroad =

Overview
- Headquarters: Pelham, GA (1904-1905); Ticknor, GA (1905- )
- Locale: Georgia, USA
- Dates of operation: 1904–1946

Technical
- Length: 23 miles (37 km)

The Flint River and Northeastern Railroad was incorporated on June 26, 1903, built in 1904 and operated 23 miles (37 km) between Pelham and Ticknor, Georgia, USA. Originally operated by the Higgston Lumber Company, the railroad was purchased by the Thomas N. Baker Lumber Company in 1905, and the headquarters was moved from Pelham to Ticknor.

On May 11, 1906, the railroad company was sold by the Thomas N. Baker Lumber Company to G.E. Smith; but the sale was mired in controversy surrounding unsettled claims at the time of sale that were brought before the Supreme Court of Georgia in 1911. The case brought by Baker against Smith was the result of Smith deducting the railroad company's preexisting and as yet unsettled debt from his payment to Baker. The court ruled in favor of Smith.

The railroad was purchased by the Georgia Northern Railway in about 1910 and was operated as a subsidiary until 1946, when it was abandoned. In 1929, the Interstate Commerce Commission's proposal of railroad consolidations would have placed the railroad in the Illinois Central system.
