= Lawrence O. Murray =

American politician (1864–1926)

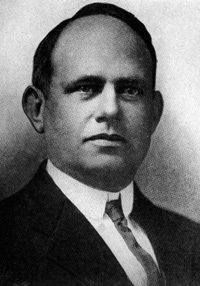

12th Comptroller of the Currency
- In office April 27, 1908 - April 27, 1913
- President: Theodore Roosevelt; William Howard Taft
- Preceded by: William Barret Ridgely
- Succeeded by: John Skelton Williams

Lawrence O. Murray (February 18, 1864 – June 10, 1926) was a United States Comptroller of the Currency from April 27, 1908, to April 27, 1913.

Attorney Lawrence O. Murray had extensive government service prior to his appointment as Comptroller by President Theodore Roosevelt. During his tenure, the size of the national banking system prompted Congress to authorize appointment of a second deputy comptroller.

In the interim before Murray's successor took office, the Federal Reserve Act was passed. The act created twelve Federal Reserve Districts, with the Comptroller designating a district chief national bank examiner for each district under whom a corps of examiners and assistants worked. Examiners were to be compensated by salary and expenses rather than fees levied on the banks they examined.
