= Albany and Northern Railway =

Railway in Georgia

Overview
- Locale: Georgia
- Dates of operation: 1895–1971

Technical
- Track gauge: 4 ft 8 1/2 in (1,435 mm) standard gauge

The Albany and Northern Railway (A&N) was founded 12 September 1895 on a 35 miles (56 km) stretch of railway from Cordele to Albany, Georgia. The line had originally been built around 1890 by the Albany, Florida and Northern Railway (AF&N). The AF&N was leased then to the Savannah, Americus and Montgomery Railway (SA&M) in 1892. In 1895, the SA&M went bankrupt and the AF&N was then reorganized into the Albany and Northern Railway.

In 1910, the Georgia, Southwestern and Gulf Railroad (GS&G) leased the A&N with the goal of opening a line from Cordele to the Gulf Coast. The GS&G ran into financial trouble and was dissolved in 1942 at which time the A&N ran independently again. Passenger service stopped in 1952, but freight and mail service continued. The Southern Railway acquired the A&N and Georgia Northern Railway in 1966, and merged the former into the latter on December 31, 1971.
