= Macon, Dublin and Savannah Railroad =

Overview
- Reporting mark: MDS
- Locale: Georgia
- Dates of operation: 1872–1957
- Successor: Seaboard Air Line Railroad; Seaboard Coast Line Railroad; CSX Transportation; Georgia Central Railway

Technical
- Track gauge: 4 ft 8 1/2 in (1,435 mm) (standard gauge)

The Macon, Dublin and Savannah Railroad (reporting mark MDS; MD&S) was chartered in 1885 as the Macon and Dublin Railroad. It was built to connect its namesake towns, Macon and Dublin. Eventually, it became a 96-mile short line operating between Macon and Vidalia.

== History ==
The oldest predecessor of the MD&S was the Griswoldville & Jeffersonville Railroad Company, incorporated in 1872. However, the construction of the Macon to Dublin line lasted from 1885 to 1892. The railroad was restructured during this time, and between the years of 1901 and 1902, the construction of the line from Dublin to Vidalia was completed. The railroad had plans to continue to Savannah, but these fell out, mostly due to the Central of Georgia not wanting to have a competitor. They were also granted some land in Macon to be used as a shop complex.

In 1906, the Atlantic Coast Line purchased the MD&S, and only a few months later, realizing it was unprofitable, sold it to a group of investors. In 1907, it was sold to the Seaboard Air Line Railroad who continued to operate the MD&S independently. Importantly, Seaboard also owned the Savannah, Americus and Montgomery Railway, which extended from Vidalia to Savannah. In 1950, the MD&S purchased three RS-2 diesel locomotives from American Locomotive Company, numbered 1700–1702. By 1955, they had purchased four more ALCOs, this time in the form of RS-3s, numbered 1703-1706 and converted their fleet to diesel. However, MD&S did not last long as an independent entity. It was fully absorbed into the Seaboard Air Line Railroad by 1957, becoming their Macon Subdivision. It acted as a feeder line for the Seaboard.

In 1967, the Seaboard Air Line merged with its rival, the Atlantic Coast Line Railroad (one of the previous owners of the MD&S). After the merger, the combined company was named the Seaboard Coast Line Railroad. The Seaboard Coast Line made many improvements between Macon and Dublin, including welded rail and new ties. This was due to the Kaolin industry booming in this region at the time. Upgrades included even concrete ties under the sidings for all of the sectors. In 1980, the Seaboard Coast Line's parent company merged with the Chessie System, creating the CSX Corporation. The CSX Corporation initially operated the Chessie and Seaboard Systems separately until 1986, when they were merged into CSX Transportation.

In 1990, CSX sold the line to Rail Link, and operated as the Georgia Central Railway. In 2004, Rail Link was acquired by Genesee & Wyoming, which continues to operate the line today.

== Historic stations ==
Milepost	City/Location	Station	Connections and notes
SK 0.0	Macon	Terminal Station	replaced original station in 1916 junction with: East Tennessee, Virginia and Georgia Railway (SOU); Georgia Southern and Florida Railway (SOU); Macon and Brunswick Railroad (ETV&G/SOU)
SK 0.5	Macon	Macon (original station)	original station located at 8th Street and Cherry Street
SK 5.0		Smithsonia	originally Swift Creek
SK 7.0		Franklinton	
SK 9.3		Dry Branch	
SK 11.0		Atlantic	
SK 12.3		Pike's Peak	
SK 15.8		Fitzpatrick	
SK 21.5		Ripley	
SK 22.9	Jeffersonville	Jeffersonville	
SK 27.6		Gallimore	
SK 31.2	Danville	Danville	originally named Hughes
SK 32.7	Allentown	Allentown	
SK 38.0	Montrose	Montrose	
SK 40.4		Haskins	
SK 42.9	Dudley	Dudley	
SK 45.8		Shewmake	
SK 48.3		Moore	
SK 53.6	Dublin	Dublin	junction with Wrightsville and Tennille Railroad (CoG)
SK 59.2		Catlin	
SK 63.2		Minter	
SK 67.6		Rockledge	junction with Wadley Southern Railway
SK 69.4		Orland	
SK 76.2	Soperton	Soperton	
SK 81.3	Tarrytown	Tarrytown	
SK 84.5		Kibbee	
SK 86.4		Allmond	
SK 92.6	Vidalia	Vidalia	junction with: Savannah, Americus and Montgomery Railway (SAL); Georgia and Florida Railroad
