= Glasgow, Georgia =

Unincorporated community in Georgia, U.S.

Coordinates: 30°43′21″N 83°52′32″W

Glasgow is an unincorporated community in Thomas County, in the U.S. state of Georgia.

== History ==
A post office called Glasgow was established in 1853, and remained in operation until 1905. The community was named after Glasgow, in Scotland, the ancestral home of a large share of the first settlers.
