= Fort Davis, Alabama =

Unincorporated community in Alabama, United States

- Unincorporated community
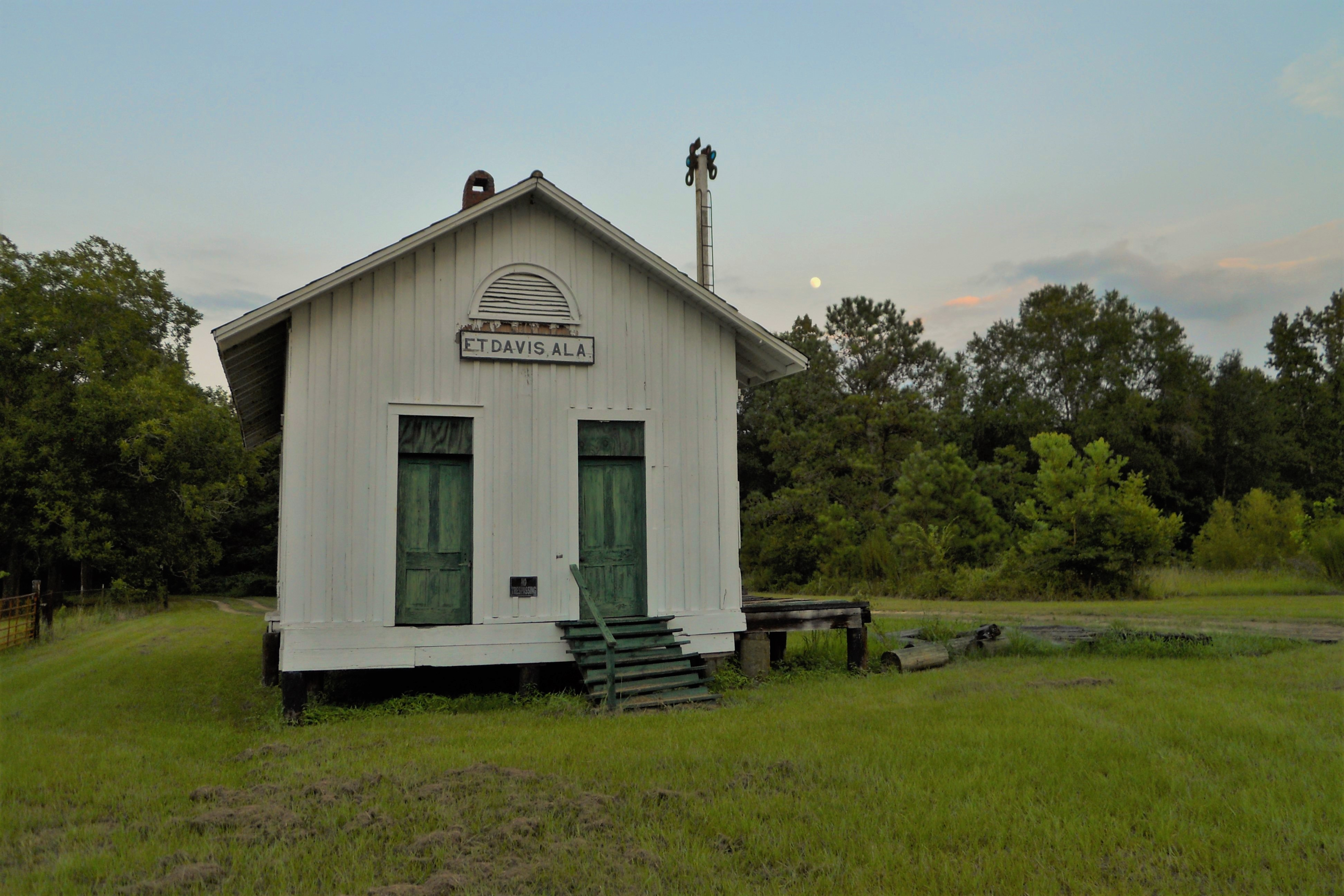
- The Fort Davis Railroad Depot in 2011.

- Location within Alabama Location within the United States
- Coordinates: 32°14′36″N 85°42′35″W
- Country: United States
- State: Alabama
- County: Macon
- Elevation: 312 ft (95 m)
- Time zone: UTC-6 (Central (CST))
  - Summer (DST): UTC-5 (CDT)
- ZIP code: 36031
- Area code: 334
- GNIS feature ID: 118517

Fort Davis is an unincorporated community in Macon County, Alabama, United States, located on U.S. Route 29, 12.9 miles (20.8 km) south of Tuskegee. Fort Davis has a post office with ZIP code 36031, which opened on June 4, 1891.

== History ==
The community of Fort Davis was named, not for a military base, but after one of its founders. Richard T. Davis married Mary C. Fort and their first son was named for his mother's family: Fort Madison Davis. Davis was a farmer, store owner, and the community's first postmaster. When the Savannah-Americus-Montgomery Railroad came through the area in the late 19th century, Fort Davis and his brother Hubert T. Davis laid out the town into lots and originally named it "Hamilton" but it was later changed to "Fort Davis" to honor the founder. Once the railroad was completed, several members of the Cotton Valley community relocated to be near the new railroad. The railroad operated in Fort Davis from 1892 until 1985. Beginning in 1987, the Railroad company dismantled the tracks.

=== Fort Davis Railroad Depot ===
The first Fort Davis Railroad Depot was constructed in 1892, which was approximately the time that the SA&M Railroad came through the community. The current building was constructed in 1904 after the original depot was damaged by a fire. The depot operated from 1892 until 1975 when the railroad deeded the depot to the Fort Davis Historical Group. The depot served as the cornerstone of the community for over one hundred years and is still a well-known landmark for south Macon and north Bullock Counties. The depot also serves as one of the last remaining structures of the SA&M Railroad.

== Gallery ==
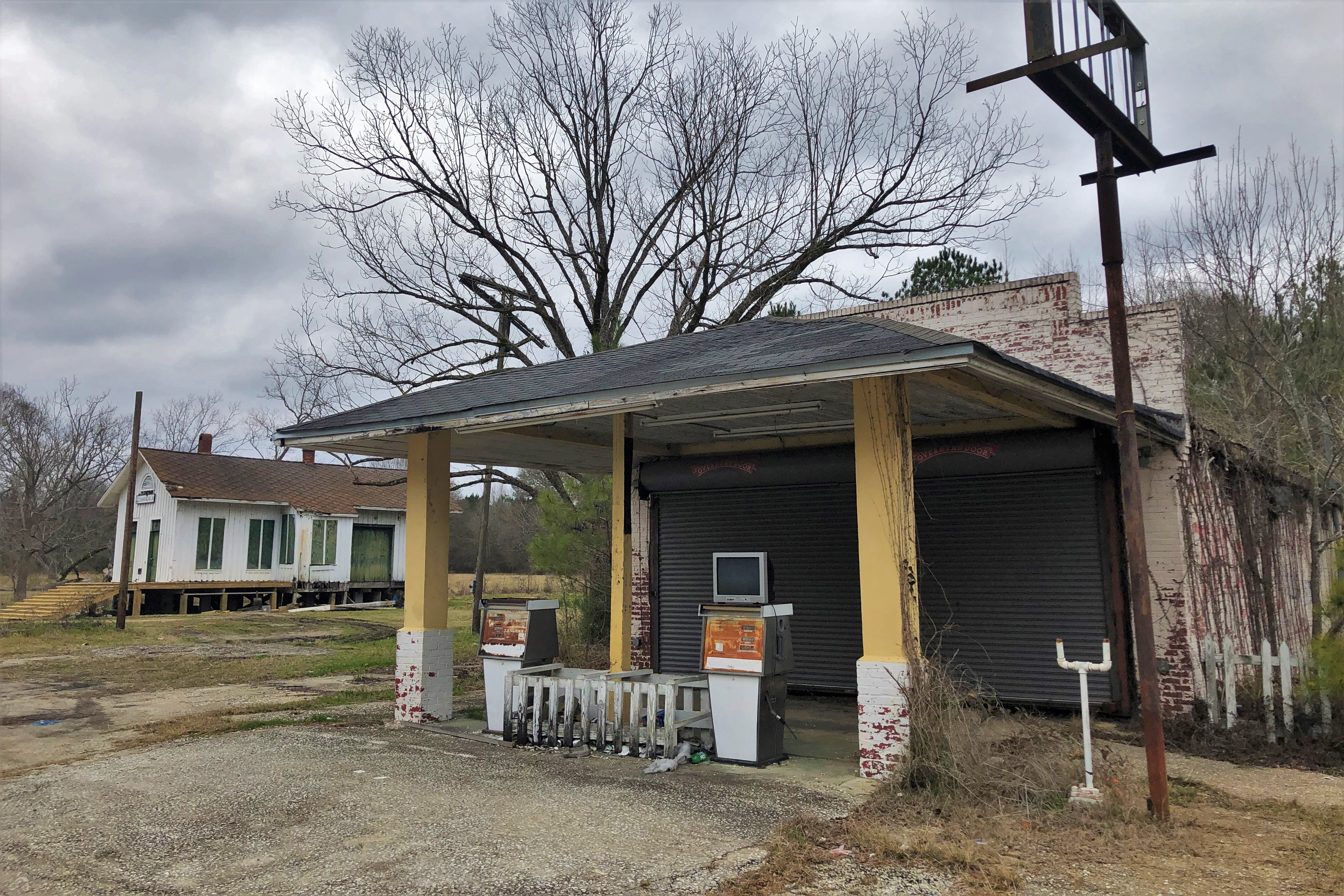
Fort Davis in 2021

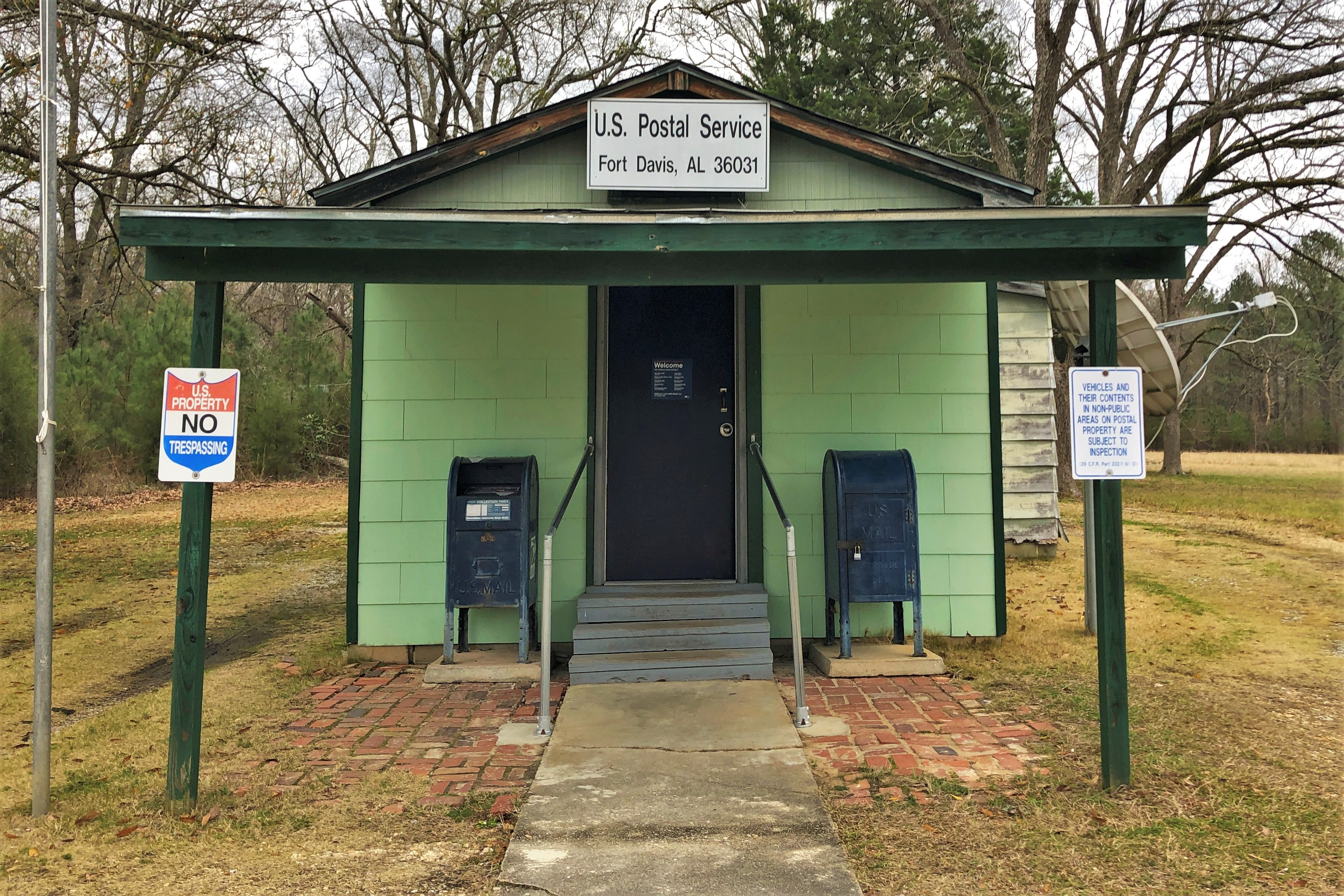
Fort Davis Post Office (ZIP code:36031)

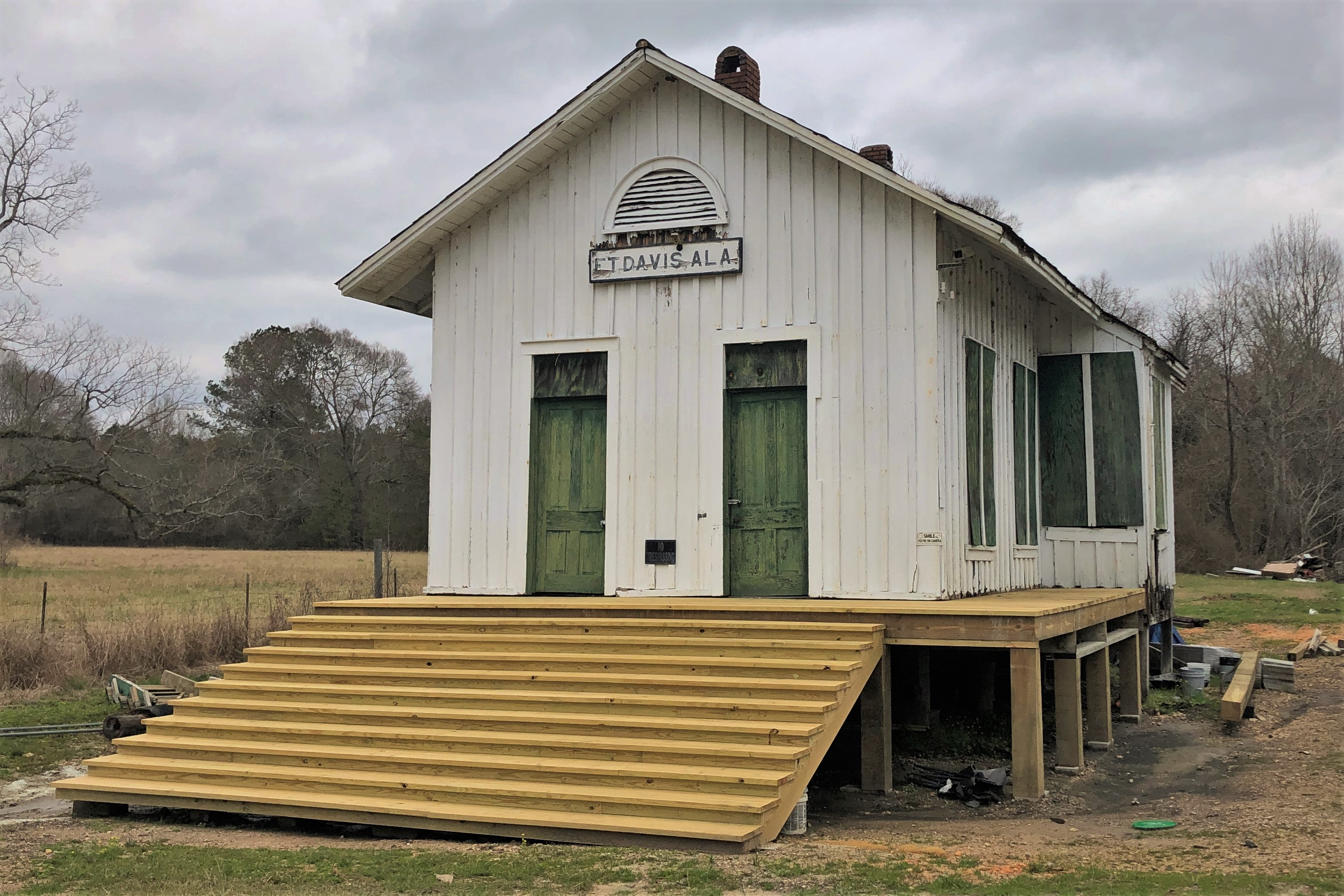
Fort Davis Railroad Depot in 2021
