= Georgia and Alabama Railroad =

Railway line in the United States

Overview
- Headquarters: Dawson, Georgia
- Reporting mark: GAAB
- Locale: Southeast Alabama, Southwest Georgia
- Dates of operation: 1989–1995
- Predecessor: Norfolk Southern
- Successor: Georgia Southwestern

Technical
- Track gauge: 4 ft 8 1/2 in (1,435 mm) (standard gauge)
- Length: 79 miles (127 km)

The original Georgia and Alabama Railroad was based in Rome, GA, incorporated in 1853, and started initial rail construction in 1857. In August 1866, the G&A officially consolidated with the Dalton and Jacksonville Railroad and the Alabama and Tennessee River Railroad Company with the intent to create a consolidated rail system from Selma, AL to Dalton, GA. The consolidated corporation was to do business under the name of the latter, but it officially took the name Selma, Rome and Dalton Railroad Company in December of that same year. Still, in some cases, business continued under the name of Georgia and Alabama Railroad. For instance, in May 1868, a contract was executed to the Georgia and Alabama Railroad, leasing 100 African American convicts in the state of Georgia to work for the railroad company without pay.

The Georgia and Alabama Railroad is not to be confused with the Georgia and Alabama Railway, which was a different entity entirely, formed in 1895 and based in Savannah. However, due to the similarity in their names, the G&A Railway was often referred to as the G&A Railroad until it became part of the Seaboard Air Line Railway ca. 1900.

In 1989, the next iteration of the Georgia and Alabama Railroad (reporting mark GAAB) was formed as a shortline railroad operating between Smithville, Georgia and White Oak, Alabama, 79 miles (127 km). RailTex consolidated its holdings in the area into the Georgia Southwestern in 1995, and the Georgia & Alabama ceased to operate under that name. The rail system, however, is still in use by the Georgia Southwestern Railroad.

== History ==
The Southwestern Railroad originally constructed the line west out of Smithville towards the Alabama state line, completing the railroad in 1860. The Southwestern was leased to the Central of Georgia in 1869 and completely integrated into the system in 1954. The remainder of the line into Alabama was constructed by the Vicksburg & Brunswick from Eufaula to Clayton, Alabama, and became part of the Central of Georgia. An extension to Ozark was later built, however, it was abandoned in 1977.

Eventually the Central of Georgia was acquired by the Southern, and later became part of Norfolk Southern. The line was cut back to White Oak February 28, 1986. The Georgia & Alabama railroad began operation on June 1, 1989 under the Thoroughbred Shortline Program between Smithville and White Oak.

Freight included peanuts, aggregates, pulpwood, and cement, which generated approximately 3,300 annual carloads for the line in 1995. Interchange was made with Norfolk Southern at Smithville, CSX Transportation at Dawson until 1990, and fellow RailTex subsidiary Georgia Southwestern at Cuthbert. After 1990, the railroad interchanged with the Georgia Great Southern at Dawson.

The Georgia & Alabama no longer existed in name after the division was merged into the Georgia Southwestern division of Railtex in 1995.
