= Archery, Georgia =

- Unincorporated community
- Location in Georgia (US state) Location in United States
- Coordinates: 32°01′33″N 84°26′01″W
- Country: United States
- State: Georgia
- County: Webster
- Elevation: 476 ft (145 m)
- Time zone: UTC−5 (Eastern (EST))
  - Summer (DST): UTC−4 (EDT)
- ZIP Code: 31780
- Area code: 229
- GNIS feature ID: 326158

Archery is an unincorporated community in Webster County, in the U.S. state of Georgia. The community lies about 3 miles (4.8 km) from Plains.

Jimmy Carter, 39th President of the United States, grew up in Archery on a farm which is now known as the "Jimmy Carter Boyhood Farm" and is part of the Jimmy Carter National Historic Site.

== History ==
Archery was laid out in 1913. The community was named by William Decker Johnson, an A.M.E. Bishop, after the "Sublime Order of Archery", an A.M.E. social service organization benefiting poor blacks. William Decker Johnson had also founded the Johnson Home Industrial College in Archery in 1912.

The historic railroad community was originally built up chiefly by African Americans, who then formed a majority of its population. A large share of the residents engaged in sharecropping. Archery was first electrified in 1938. Amenities in the community included a train depot, schoolhouse, and country store.

U.S. President Jimmy Carter grew up at Archery on his family's farm from age four, in 1928, until he left for college in 1941. In Carter's time, the population consisted of approximately 25 black families and two white families, namely the Watsons and Carters. President Carter recalled in 1976 that Bishop Johnson was "the best-educated, most famous, the most widely traveled, and the richest member of the community". The Carter family remained at Archery until 1949; ownership of the Carter property was transferred to the National Park Service in 1994.

== Arts and culture ==
The Jimmy Carter Boyhood Farm, open to visitors, has been restored to its original rustic appearance. SAM Shortline Railway, a heritage railway open to the public, makes a stop on its route at the Archery Depot, where visitors may make a self-guided tour.

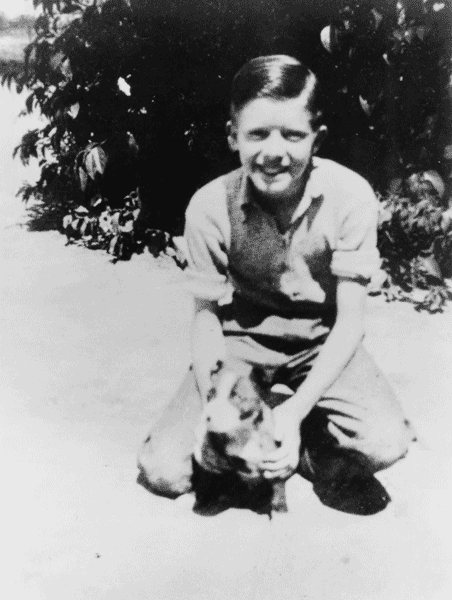
Jimmy Carter in 1937

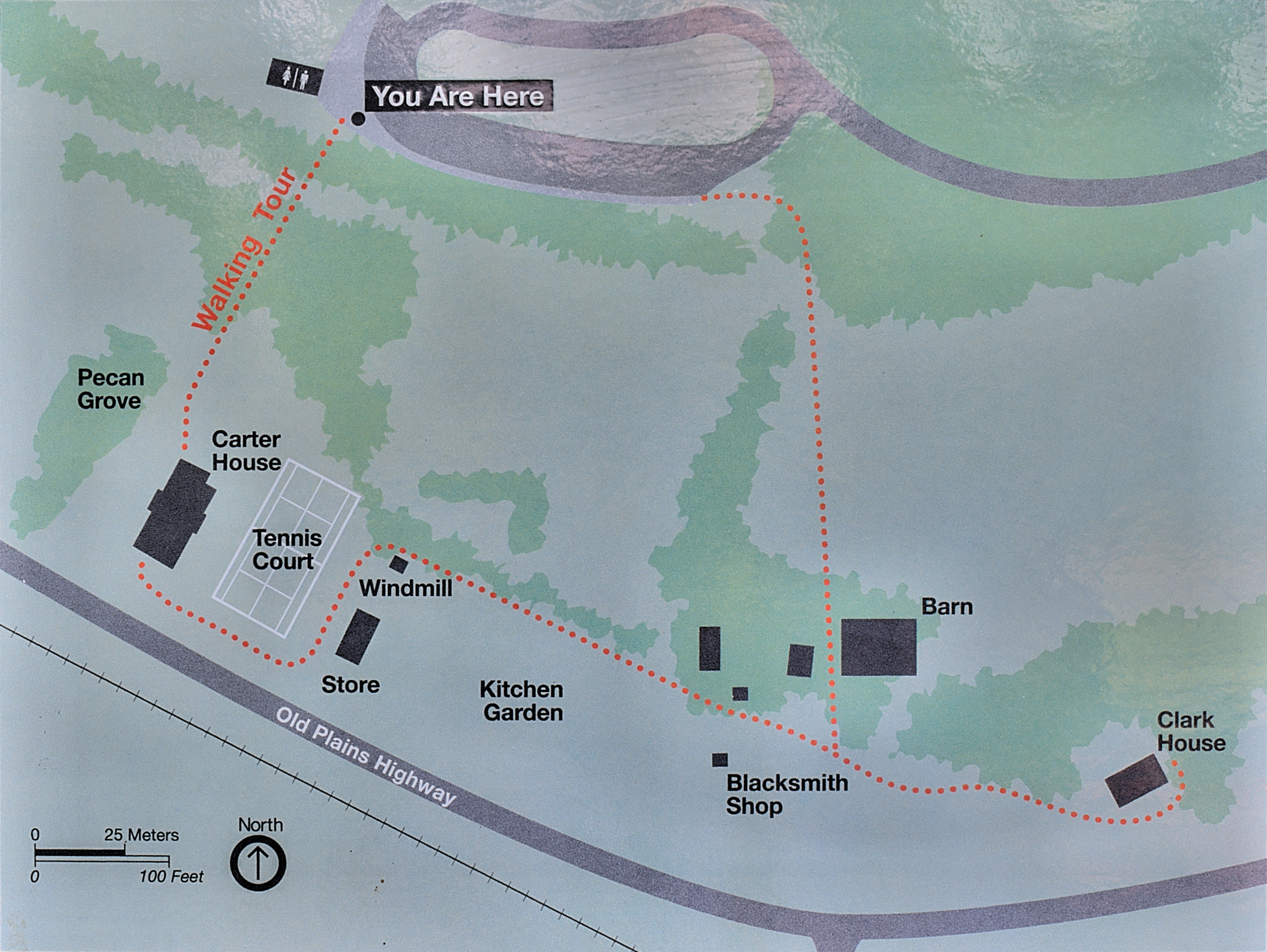
Map of Carter Farm
