= Browning, Georgia =

Unincorporated community in Georgia, U.S.

Coordinates: 31°55′03″N 83°16′21″W

Browning is an unincorporated community in Wilcox County, in the U.S. state of Georgia.

== History ==
Variant names were "Bede" and "Browning Station". A post office called Bede was established in 1890 (135 years ago), and remained in operation until 1910 (115 years ago). Beside the post office, the community had a railroad depot.
