= Meldrim trestle disaster =

1959 railway accident in Georgia, United States

Coordinates: 32°08′40″N 81°24′11″W

- Date: June 28, 1959
- Time: 3:30 pm (EST)
- Location: Trestle rail bridge over the Ogeechee River in Meldrim, Georgia, United States
- Type: Freight train derailment and LPG flash fire
- Cause: Deflected rail beams as a consequence of thermal expansion
- Deaths: 23 + an unborn child
- Injuries: 7

The Meldrim trestle disaster was a train derailment and fire at Meldrim, Georgia, United States, on June 28, 1959. Involved was a Seaboard Air Line mixed freight train that derailed over a trestle bridge across the Ogeechee River. Loaded LPG tank cars from the train fell onto the riverbank below and ruptured. The resulting fire killed 23 people, including entire families and a woman who was eight months pregnant, who were at the river shore in an area popular for swimming and picnicking. The derailment was caused by deflection of the rails on the trestle due to heat-induced expansion, resulting in the wheels of one car dropping between the rails.

== Derailment ==
Eastbound Seaboard Air Line freight train no. 82 departed Americus, Georgia, at 7:00 a.m., composed of 123 cars, four diesel-electric locomotives and a caboose. After stopping in Vidalia and Collins, it headed toward Savannah. At roughly 3:30 p.m., while crossing the Ogeechee River over a 25-foot (7.6 m) high, 350-foot (110 m) long trestle bridge at an estimated speed of 46–49 miles per hour (74–79 km/h), sixteen cars derailed after the wheels of one of the cars slipped between the rails. The derailment occurred because of rail beam deflection on the trestle, which was caused by the high ambient temperature and the consequent thermal expansion. Ten of the derailed cars broke free of the bridge and were scattered onto the riverbank. Seventy-five feet (23 m) of the bridge was destroyed by the initial derailment.

== Flash fire ==
Two of the cars that fell off the bridge were 11,000 U.S. gallons (42 m^{3}) liquefied petroleum gas (LPG) cars (effectively the only LPG cars in the mile-long train). The fall from the bridge drove the coupler of one of the LPG cars into the tank head of the other. The LPG then began to escape, boil and form a vapor cloud. At some point, the LPG was ignited, probably from mechanical sparks caused from the wreck or a campfire. The resulting flash fire was roughly 1,000 feet (300 m) wide and started secondary fires. Sources disagree as to whether a BLEVE occurred. Some 175 people were present at the time in a recreation area by the bridge. Some of them were caught on the bank, while others were bathing in the river. The fires destroyed a further 110 feet (34 m) of the bridge and damaged another 300 feet (91 m). Due to the poor accessibility of the area (limited to a single-lane dirt road), it was very hard for emergency services to reach the scene.

== Investigation ==
The Interstate Commerce Commission (ICC) found the rail beams deflection as the proximate cause of the derailment. The investigation also faulted the railroad for not installing guard rails along the trestle, which might have helped to keep the derailed equipment on the trestle deck.

== See also ==
- Los Alfaques disaster
