= Meldrim, Georgia =

Human settlement in Georgia, United States

Coordinates: 32°08′36″N 81°22′40″W

Meldrim is an unincorporated community in Effingham County, Georgia, United States, located about 17 miles northwest of Savannah. It is most likely named for Peter Meldrim, a nineteenth century politician, judge and army officer from Georgia. The ZIP Code for Meldrim is 31318.

It is the site of a paper mill, and is noted for a 1959 railway disaster.
