= Georgia Central Railway =

Railway in Georgia

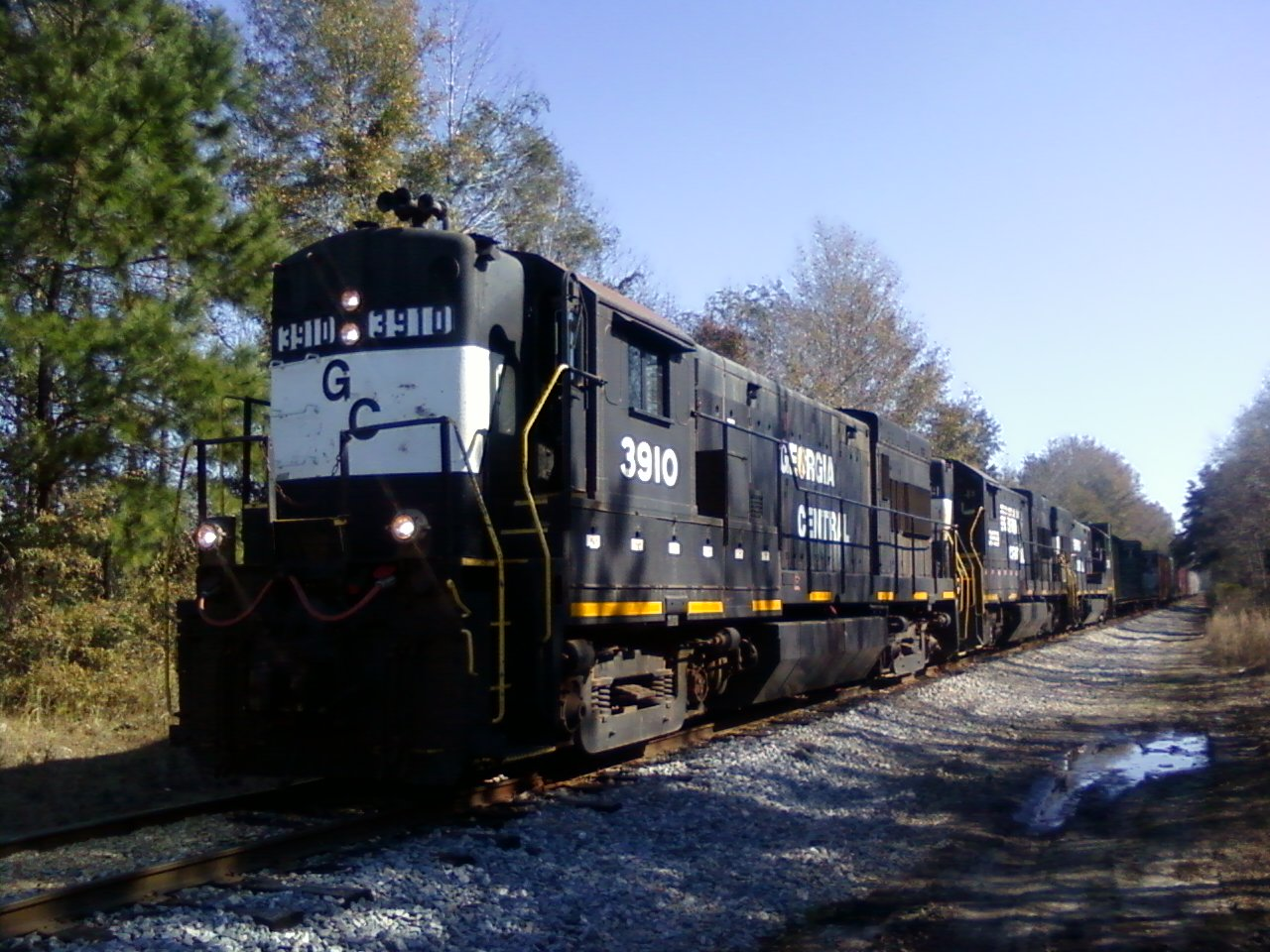
- Georgia Central U23Bs lead a freight train through Garden City, Georgia in 2010.

Overview
- Headquarters: Lyons, Georgia
- Reporting mark: GC
- Locale: Georgia
- Predecessor: Macon, Dublin, and Savannah Railroad; Savannah, Americus, and Montgomery; Seaboard Air Line Railroad; Seaboard Coast Line; Family lines System; Seaboard System; CSX Transportation

Technical
- Track gauge: Standard (4" 8.5')
- Length: 171 miles (275 km)

Other
- Website: Official website

The Georgia Central Railway (reporting mark GC) operates about 171 miles (275 km) of former Seaboard Coast Line track from Macon, Georgia through Dublin, Georgia and Vidalia, Georgia to Savannah, Georgia. It also operates about 20 miles (32 km) of trackage between Savannah and Riceboro, Georgia, switching Interstate Paper LLC. It connects with CSX Transportation and the Norfolk Southern Railway. The Georgia Central Railway is owned by Rail Link, a subsidiary of Genesee & Wyoming Inc.

== Locomotives ==
The Georgia Central operates a roster of GE U23B, GE U30B, GE B32-8, EMD GP9, EMD GP18, EMD GP38, and EMD SW9 locomotives.

== History ==
The Georgia Central Railway was chartered in 1885 as the Macon and Dublin Railroad, to connect its namesake cities. In 1891, it changed its name to the Macon, Dublin and Savannah Railway, even though the railroad did not reach the port city of Savannah. In fact, the original railroad did not go closer to the coast than Vidalia, where it interchanged with the Savannah, Americus, and Montgomery Railroad. In 1912, the MD&S was purchased by the Seaboard Air Line Railroad. It continued to be operated separately until 1954, when it was fully absorbed into the Seaboard.

In 1990, a new Georgia Central Railroad was formed by Rail Link, which purchased former Macon, Dublin, and Savannah, and the Savannah, Americus, and Montgomery, from CSX, the Seaboard's successor. The ownership of the Georgia Central changed hands in 2012, when Genesee & Wyoming purchased Rail Link.

== Infrastructure ==
In 2019, the Georgia Central began improving track conditions so that it can handle 286,000 lb. railcars, the same as class 1 railroads.

== See also ==
- Macon, Dublin and Savannah Railroad (predecessor)
- Savannah, Americus and Montgomery Railway (predecessor)
