= John Skelton Williams =

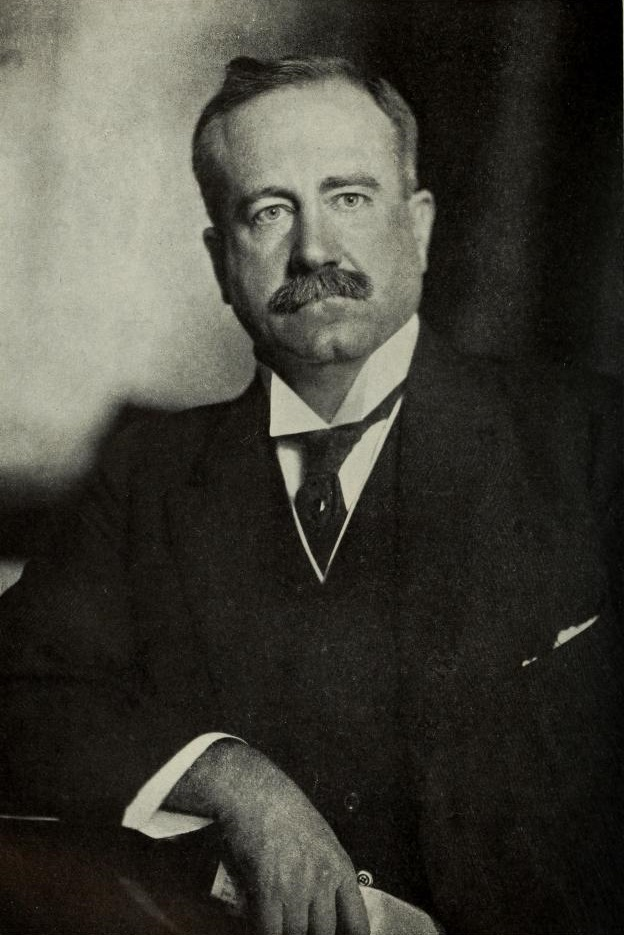

13th Comptroller of the Currency
- In office February 2, 1914 - March 2, 1921
- President: Woodrow Wilson
- Preceded by: Lawrence O. Murray
- Succeeded by: Daniel Richard Crissinger

Personal details
- Born: July 6, 1865 Paxton, Powhatan County, Virginia
- Died: November 4, 1926 (aged 61) Richmond, Virginia
- Spouse: Lila Lefebvre Issacs
- Children: John Skelton Williams Jr, Hubert Skelton Williams
- Parent(s): John Langbourne Williams and Maria Skelton Williams
- Occupation: Financier

John Skelton Williams (July 6, 1865 – November 4, 1926) was a United States Comptroller of the Currency from 1914 to 1921 and the first president of the Seaboard Air Line Railway.

== Biography ==
John Skelton Williams was a leading southern financier. He served as the Comptroller of the Currency under President Woodrow Wilson from 1914 to 1921 after serving as Assistant Secretary of the Treasury. Previously, he had organized the Seaboard Air Line Railway into a single company, and served as its president from 1900 to 1903.

Williams was Comptroller throughout World War I. Under his leadership, the agency worked closely with the War Finance Corporation, which was established in 1918 to provide credit to businesses, including banks, to promote the war effort. A segregationist, he imposed segregation on the Bureau of Engraving and Printing and ended promotions for black workers. During William's term, legislation was passed allowing the consolidation of two or more banks. On July 31, 1920 Williams released a report to the press detailing how interest rates for "call money" were manipulated to the advantage of insider speculators and the disadvantage of borrowers nationwide paying higher interest rates. This statement is published verbatim in toto in H.C. Cutting, The Strangle Hold (Chicago, M.A. Donohue, 1921) p. 297-317.

Political offices
Preceded by Lawrence O. Murray	Comptroller of the Currency; 1914–1921	Succeeded by Daniel Richard Crissinger
