= Mahrt, Alabama =

Locale in Russell County, Alabama, US

Mahrt , Alabama
- Unincorporated community
- Location within Alabama Location within the United States
- Coordinates: 32°10′35″N 85°02′12″W
- Country: United States
- State: Alabama
- County: Russell
- Time zone: UTC-6 (Central (CST))
  - Summer (DST): UTC-5 (CDT)
- Area code: 334

Mahrt is an unincorporated community in Russell County, Alabama. The community is home to a paper mill and a rail terminus. Mahrt is located along the Chattahoochee River. It is 40 river miles south of Columbus, Georgia and on the other side of the river in Alabama.

The mill had various owners including MeadWestvaco (which became part of WestRock). Al Mahrt was a founder of Georgia Kraft Company. The area was named for the Mead executive.

== See also ==
- Cottonton, Alabama
