= RailTex =

- Traded as: Nasdaq: RTEX
- Industry: Rail transport
- Founded: December 1977
- Founder: Bruce Flohr
- Defunct: February 2000
- Headquarters: San Antonio, Texas
- Area served: North America
- Website: www.railtex.com

RailTex was a transportation holding company that specialized in owning and operating short line railroads across North America.

Based in San Antonio, Texas, the public company was a leader in making unprofitable lines shed by Class I railroads into viable transportation routes. The company was taken over by RailAmerica in February 2000.

== History ==
RailTex was founded in December 1977 by Bruce Flohr as a business that leased rail cars. Flohr had invested $50,000 of his own money and had investor help for another $50,000 from investors. Flohr had started as a Southern Pacific train-crew brakeman in 1965 and rose to superintendent of Southern Pacific's San Antonio Division until he became deputy administrator of the Federal Railroad Administration in 1975.

Seeking to broaden the revenue base, he purchased the San Diego & Imperial Valley Railroad. Operating the railroad the company quickly developed a formula for a series of successful takeovers, including:

- Taking over only railroads where he could operate on a non-union basis - RailTex trains operated with two employees paid $10 to $15 an hour while union trains operated with three to four paid an average of $25 an hour. RailTex employees were called transportation specialists or "transpecs,"
- Deploying three marketing managers rather than the usual one for the line and then marketing to businesses five to 10 miles from the track as opposed to the usual next-to-the-track customers
- Purchasing older locomotives which could be acquired for a fraction of the cost of new locomotives.

In 1986 it acquired its second short line, Austin & Northwestern Railroad.In 1989 it sold its rail car business to Chrysler. By 1991 it operated 1,500 miles of track in 12 states with 60 locomotives.

RailTex went public in 1993 trading on Nasdaq under the sign RTEX. In 1996, RailTex was part of a consortium with Companhia Vale do Rio Doce that was awarded a concession to operate the 4,400-mile Center Eastern Network in Brazil. Later the same year, in a consortium with GP Investments it won a further concession to operate the Southern Network. The Brazilian interests were sold in 1999.

In February 2000, the company was taken over by RailAmerica. It had 26 railroads over approximately 4,100 route miles in the southeastern, midwestern and New England regions of the United States, as well as Eastern Canada and Mexico.
