= List of railroads incorporated in Florida =

Most of the railroads were chartered by the Florida State Legislature, but some were incorporated under the general incorporation laws. The Legislature met every two years, which is why most railroads were incorporated in odd-numbered years.

Between 1831 and 1939, the territory and state of Florida chartered 564 companies to build and/or operate railroads. Two hundred and fifty-one of those companies actually build railroads. By 1939, abandonment and consolidation had reduced the number of companies operating railroads in Florida to just 22.

== 1830s ==
- The Leon Rail-Way was chartered by the territorial legislature in 1831. It was rechartered as the Leon Railroad Company in 1832, and again as the Tallahassee Railroad in 1834. The railroad began partial operation in 1836, making it the second railroad in Florida.
- The Florida, Alabama & Georgia Railroad was chartered by the Florida territorial legislature in 1834. After Alabama chartered the Alabama, Florida & Georgia Railroad, Florida accepted the Alabama charter in 1835. Construction was started, and the Montgomery and West Point Railroad was acquired as part of a plan to connect Pensacola with Montgomery, Alabama. The Panic of 1837 caused the Bank of Pensacola, which had floated the bonds for the railroad, to fail, and the Territory of Florida repudiated its backing of the bonds. The company collapsed without ever operating a train.
- The Lake Wimico and St. Joseph Canal Company was chartered by the territorial legislature in 1835. The company began construction of a railroad instead of a canal, and it was rechartered as the Lake Wimico and St. Joseph Canal and Railroad Company in 1836. The railroad began operating in March 1835. The railroad ceased operations in the early 1840s.
- The Pond Creek and Blackwater River Canal Company was chartered by the territorial legislature in 1835. In 1838 it was rechartered as the Arcadia Railroad. It transported lumber over a three-mile track between Pond Creek and Blackwater River using mule-power.

== 1850s ==
- The Florida, Atlantic & Gulf Central Railroad was chartered by the state legislature in 1851. Construction began in 1855 on a route from Jacksonville to Alligator (renamed Lake City in 1859). The line was completed to Lake City in 1860.
- The Pensacola & Georgia Railroad was chartered by the state legislature in 1853. In 1855 the company's charter was amended to allow the company to connect Pensacola to Lake City. Construction began in Tallahassee in 1856. That same year the Pensacola & Georgia acquired control of the Tallahassee Railroad. The first new section of the railroad, from Tallahassee to Capitola, opened in 1857. The line from Tallahassee to Lake City was completed at the beginning of 1861. The Pensacola & Georgia Railroad opened an extension from Tallahassee to Quincy in 1863. The Florida portion of a line from Lake City to Lawton, Georgia was completed by the Florida & Georgia Railroad in 1865.
- The Alabama & Florida Railroad was chartered by Florida in 1853. It opened its first track between Pensacola and Pollard, Alabama in 1861. The company went bankrupt and was sold at foreclosure to the Pensacola and Louisville Railroad in 1869. It was reorganized as the Pensacola Railroad in 1877, and sold to the Louisville and Nashville Railroad a few years later.
- The Florida Railroad was chartered by Florida in 1853. Originally conceived as a line from Amelia Island (Fernandina Beach) to Tampa, with a branch to Cedar Key, the company decided to build the Cedar Key branch before extending to Tampa. The line from Fernandina had reached Starke by 1858, and Cedar Key in 1860.
- In 1858 the legislature chartered the St. Johns Railroad, running between Tocoi Landing on the St. Johns River and New Augustine, on the San Sebastian River across from St. Augustine. It was in operation by 1860.

== 1878 ==
- Silver Springs, Ocala and Gulf Railroad (not legislatively chartered)

== 1881 ==
- Green Cove Spring and Melrose Railroad
- Live Oak and Rowland's Bluff Railroad
- Pensacola and Atlantic Railroad
- Tropical Peninsular Railroad

== 1883 ==
- Fernandina and Amelia Beach Railway
- Fort Meade, Keystone and Walk-in-the-Water Railroad
- International Railroad and Steamship Company of Florida
- Seville and Halifax River Railroad
- Tavares, Orlando and Atlantic Railroad

== 1885 ==
- Apalachicola and Alabama Railroad
- Chattahoochee and Alabama Railroad
- Key West Street Car Company
- Kissimmee City Street Railway
- Live Oak and White Springs Railroad
- Santa Fee and St. Johns Railway
- Tampa Street Railway
- Wildwood, Lady Lake, Withlacoochee and Gulf Railway
- Winter Park Company

== 1887 ==
- Alabama Midland Railway
- Atlantic and Gulf Railroad and Steamboat Company
- Eufaula and St. Andrews Bay Air-line Railroad
- Georgia, Florida and Key West Railway
- Key of the Gulf Railroad
- Ocala, Silver Springs and Park Street Railroad
- Pensacola and Birmingham Railroad
- St. Johns River, Lake Weir and Gulf Railroad
- Suwannee and Gulf Railroad

== 1888 ==
- Ocala Street and Suburban Railroad Company (not legislatively chartered)

== 1889 ==
- Augusta, Tallahassee and Gulf Railroad

== 1891 ==
- Arcadia, Gulf Coast and Lakeland Railroad
- Carrabelle, Tallahassee and Georgia Railroad (not legislatively chartered)
- Chipola and Chippewa Lake Railroad
- Florida, Georgia and Western Railway
- Homosassa and Withlacoochee Railroad
- Lakeland, Mohawk and Tavares Railroad

== 1892 ==
- Bartow and Plant City Railway (not legislatively chartered)

== 1893 ==
- Atlantic, Suwannee River and Gulf Railway
- Florida Grand Trunk Railway
- Gulf and Florida Northern Railroad
- Palm Beach Railway and Power Company
- Peninsular Northern Railroad (name changed from Lakeland, Mohawk and Tavares Railroad)
- South American and International Railroad
- Tampa and Western Railroad
- Western Peninsular Railroad
- Withlacoochee Railway
- The Withlacoochee, Plant City and Boca Grande Railroad (name changed from Homosassa and Withlacoochee Railroad)

== unknown ==
- Atlantic, Suwannee River and Gulf Railroad (not legislatively chartered)
- East Florida Railway
- Florida Midland Railway
- Florida Midland and Georgia Railroad
- Jacksonville and Atlantic Railroad
- Jacksonville, St. Augustine and Halifax River Railway (not legislatively chartered)
- Jacksonville, St. Augustine and Indian River Railway
- Monticello and Georgia Railroad
- Orange Ridge, DeLand and Atlantic Railroad
- St. Johns and Halifax Railway
- Savannah, Florida and Western Railway
- South Florida Railroad
- Thomasville, Tallahassee and Gulf Railroad
