= List of Florida railroads =

This is a list of railroads operating in the U.S. state of Florida.

== Current railroads ==
=== Common freight carriers ===
- Alabama and Gulf Coast Railway (AGR) (GWI)
- AN Railway (AN) (GWI)
- Bay Line Railroad (BAYL) (GWI)
- CSX Transportation (CSXT)
- First Coast Railroad (FCRD) (GWI)
- Florida Central Railroad (FCEN)
- Florida East Coast Railway (FEC)
- Florida Gulf & Atlantic Railroad (FGA)
- Florida Midland Railroad (FMID)
- Florida Northern Railroad (FNOR)
- Georgia and Florida Railway (GFRR)
- Jacksonville Port Terminal Railroad (JXPT) (Watco)
- Norfolk Southern Railway (NS) through subsidiary Georgia Southern and Florida Railway (GSF)
- Seminole Gulf Railway (SGLR)
- South Central Florida Express, Inc. (SCXF)

=== Private freight carriers ===
- CF Industries (CFIZ)
- Conrad Yelvington Distributors, Inc. (CNYX)
- The Mosaic Company (IMCX)
- Orlando Utilities Commission (OUCX)
- Perdue Farms (PFMX)
- Port Manatee Railroad (MAUP)
- Port of Palm Beach District (PPBD)
- Port of Panama City (PPC)
- United States Sugar Corporation (USSC)

=== Passenger carriers ===
- Amtrak (AMTK)
- Brightline (BLFX)
- Florida Railroad Museum (FGCX)
- Gold Coast Railroad Museum (GCOX)
- Jacksonville Skyway
- Kirby Family Farm Train
- Miami Metromover and Miami Metrorail (Note: Under same management and with a walking-distance transfer between the two.)
- Seminole Gulf Railway (SGLR)
- Serengeti Express (located in Busch Gardens Tampa)
- Sugar Express (CHOX)
- SunRail (CFRC)
- Tradewinds & Atlantic Railroad
- TECO Line Streetcar
- Tri-Rail (TRCX)
- Walt Disney World
  - Walt Disney World Monorail and Walt Disney World Railroad (Note: Under same management and with a walking-distance transfer between the two.)
  - Wildlife Express Train

=== Private carriers ===
- Clay Springs and Apopka Railroad
- Ellaville, West Lake and Jennings Railroad
- Florida and Georgia Railway
- Peace River Phosphate Company
- Pensacola and Andalusia Railroad
- Starke and New River Railroad
- Union Cypress Company
- Winston Lumber Company

=== Never built ===
- Apopka and Atlantic Railroad
- Choctawhatchee and Northern Railroad
- Glen Cove Springs and Fort Fanning Railroad

== Defunct railroads ==
Name	Mark	System (Note: This is one or more of the Class I railroads that the railroad became part of, if any.)	From	To	Successor	Notes
Alabama and Florida Railroad (1853–1869)		L&N	1853	1869	Pensacola and Louisville Railroad	
Alabama and Florida Railroad (1898–1900)		L&N	1898	1900	Louisville and Nashville Railroad	
Alabama and Florida Railroad (1936–1941)			1936	1941	Ceased operations in 1941	
Alabama and Florida Railroad (1986–1992)	AFLR		1986	1992	Alabama and Florida Railway	
Alabama and Florida Railway	AF		1992	2011	Ceased operations in 2011	
Alabama and Western Florida Railroad			1926	1939		
Alabama, Florida and Gulf Railroad			1917	1936	Alabama and Florida Railroad (1936–1941)	
Alabama, Florida and Southern Railroad			1910	1917	Alabama, Florida and Gulf Railroad	
Alafia, Manatee, and Gulf Coast Railroad		SAL	1897	1906	Charlotte Harbor and Northern Railway	
Andalusia, Florida and Gulf Railway			1919	1925	N/A	
Apalachicola Northern Railroad	AN		1903		Later served by the AN Railway, the line is abandoned.	
Arcadia, Gulf Coast and Lakeland Railroad			1891	1893	Florida, Peninsular and Gulf Railroad	
Arlington and Atlantic Railway		FEC	1892	1892	Jacksonville and Atlantic Railroad	
Atlanta and St. Andrews Bay Railway	A&SA, ASAB		1906	1993	Bay Line Railroad	
Atlantic Coast Line Railroad	ACL	ACL	1902	1967	Seaboard Coast Line Railroad	
Atlantic Coast, St. Johns and Indian River Railway		FEC	1883	1899	Southeastern Railway	
Atlantic and East Coast Terminal Company		ACL/ FEC	1905			
Atlantic and Gulf Railroad	A&G	ACL	1866	1879	Savannah, Florida and Western Railway	
Atlantic, Gulf and West India Transit Company		SAL	1872	1881	Florida Transit Railroad	
Atlantic, Suwannee River and Gulf Railroad		SAL	1893	1893	Atlantic, Suwannee River and Gulf Railway	
Atlantic, Suwannee River and Gulf Railway		SAL	1893	1909	Seaboard Air Line Railway	
Atlantic, Valdosta and Western Railway		SOU	1897	1902	Georgia Southern and Florida Railway, St. Johns River Terminal Company	
Atlantic and Western Railroad		FEC	1888	1896	Florida East Coast Railway	
Augusta, Tallahassee and Gulf Railroad		SAL	1888	1891	Carrabelle, Tallahassee and Georgia Railroad	
Birmingham, Columbus and St. Andrews Railroad			1903	1926	Alabama and Western Florida Railroad	
Blue Spring, Orange City and Atlantic Railroad		FEC	1878	1887	Atlantic and Western Railroad	
Bradford Farms Railroad						Prison Spur between Raiford and Lawtey
Brooksville and Hudson Railroad			1902	1907	Tampa Northern Railroad	
Brooksville and Inverness Railway		SAL	1925	1946	Seaboard Air Line Railroad	
Burlington Northern Inc.	BN		1980	1981	Burlington Northern Railroad	
Burlington Northern Railroad	BN		1981	1996	Burlington Northern and Santa Fe Railway	
Burlington Northern and Santa Fe Railway	BNSF		1996	1997	Alabama and Gulf Coast Railway	
Carrabelle, Tallahassee and Georgia Railroad		SAL	1891	1906	Georgia, Florida and Alabama Railway	
Central of Georgia Railway	CG	CG	1904	1939	N/A	
Charlotte Harbor and Northern Railway		SAL	1906	1946	Seaboard Air Line Railroad	
Chattahoochee and East Pass Railway		ACL	1881	1884	Savannah, Florida and Western Railway	
DeLand and St. John's River Railroad		ACL	1886	1890	Jacksonville, Tampa and Key West Railway	
East Florida Railway		ACL	1880	1884	Savannah, Florida and Western Railway	
East Florida and Atlantic Railroad		SAL	1891	1893	Florida Central and Peninsular Railroad	
East and West Coast Railway	E&WC	SAL	1913	1945	Seaboard Air Line Railroad	
Fellsmere Railroad			1911	1924	Trans-Florida Central Railroad	
Fernandina and Amelia Beach Railway		SAL	1883	1894	Florida Central and Peninsular Railroad	
Fernandina and Jacksonville Railroad		SAL	1880	1884	Florida Railway and Navigation Company	
Florida Railroad		SAL	1853	1872	Atlantic, Gulf and West India Transit Company	
Florida Railway			1905			
Florida Railway and Navigation Company		SAL	1884	1888	Florida Central and Peninsular Railroad	
Florida and Alabama Railroad			before 1914	1939	N/A	
Florida, Alabama and Gulf Railroad			before 1911	1919	Andalusia, Florida and Gulf Railway	
Florida, Atlantic and Gulf Central Railroad		SAL	1851	1868	Florida Central Railroad	
Florida Central Railroad		ACL	1907	1914	Atlantic Coast Line Railroad	
Florida Central Railroad		SAL	1868	1882	Florida Central and Western Railroad	
Florida Central and Gulf Railway		SAL	1916	1931	N/A	
Florida Central and Peninsular Railroad		SAL	1888	1903	Seaboard Air Line Railway	
Florida Central and Western Railroad		SAL	1882	1884	Florida Railway and Navigation Company	
Florida Coast and Gulf Railway		FEC	1892	1892	Jacksonville, St. Augustine and Indian River Railway	
Florida, Georgia and Western Railway		SAL	1891	1895	Tallahassee Southeastern Railway	
Florida Midland Railway		ACL	1883	1896	Atlantic Coast Line Railroad	
Florida, Peninsular and Gulf Railroad			1893			
Florida Southern Railroad		ACL	1892	1903	Atlantic Coast Line Railroad	
Florida Southern Railway		ACL	1881	1892	Florida Southern Railroad	
Florida Steinhatchee Railway						
Florida Transit Railroad		SAL	1881	1883	Florida Transit and Peninsular Railroad	
Florida Transit and Peninsular Railroad		SAL	1883	1884	Florida Railway and Navigation Company	
Florida West Shore Railway		SAL	1903	1909	Seaboard Air Line Railway	
Florida Western Railroad		SAL	1881	1882	Pensacola and Atlantic Railroad	
Florida Western and Northern Railroad		SAL	1924	1945	Seaboard Air Line Railroad	
Fort Myers Southern Railroad	FMS	ACL	1917	1987	Atlantic Coast Line Railroad	
Fort White and Southern Railway			1896			
Fort Wilderness Railroad	FWRR		1974	1980		
Gainesville and Gulf Railway		SAL	1895	1907	Tampa and Jacksonville Railway	
Gainesville, Ocala and Charlotte Harbor Railroad		ACL	1876	1881	Florida Southern Railway	
Gainesville, Rocky Point and Micanopy Railway		SAL	1884	1895	Gainesville and Gulf Railway	
Georgia and Florida RailNet	GFRR		1999	2005	Georgia and Florida Railway	
Georgia and Florida Railroad	GFRR		1995	1999	Georgia and Florida RailNet	
Georgia and Florida Railroad	G&F	G&F	1926	1951	Valdosta Southern Railroad	
Georgia and Florida Railway	G&F	G&F	1906	1926	Georgia and Florida Railroad	
Georgia, Florida and Alabama Railroad	GF&A	SAL	1927	1974	Seaboard Coast Line Railroad	
Georgia, Florida and Alabama Railway	GF&A	SAL	1901	1928	Georgia, Florida and Alabama Railroad	
Georgia Pine Railway		SAL	1895	1901	Georgia, Florida and Alabama Railway	former logging railroad
Georgia Southern and Florida Railroad		SOU	1889	1895	Georgia Southern and Florida Railway	
Green Cove and Midland Railway			1885	1892	Southwestern Railroad	
Green Cove Springs and Melrose Railroad			1881	1885	Green Cove and Midland Railway	
Gulf Coast Railway			1915	1921	N/A	
Gulf, Florida and Alabama Railway (Deep Water Route)	DWR	SLSF	1911	1922	Muscle Shoals, Birmingham and Pensacola Railway	
Gulf Ports Terminal Railway		SLSF	1916	1927	Muscle Shoals, Birmingham and Pensacola Railroad	
Halifax and Indian River Railway		FEC	1891	1892	Florida Coast and Gulf Railway	
Inland Lakes Railway			2005	2009		Former tourist railroad in Tavares.
Jacksonville and Atlantic Railroad		FEC	1892	1892	Jacksonville and Atlantic Railway	
Jacksonville and Atlantic Railway		FEC	1893	1900	Florida East Coast Railway	
Jacksonville Belt Railroad		SAL	1886	1888	Florida Central and Peninsular Railroad	
Jacksonville Bridge Company		FEC	1888	1892	Florida Coast and Gulf Railway	
Jacksonville, Gainesville, and Gulf Railway		SAL	1926	1943	N/A	
Jacksonville, Pensacola and Mobile Railroad		SAL	1869	1882	Florida Central and Western Railroad	
Jacksonville, St. Augustine and Halifax River Railway		FEC	1881	1892	Florida Coast and Gulf Railway	
Jacksonville, St. Augustine and Indian River Railway		FEC	1892	1895	Florida East Coast Railway	
Jacksonville and St. John's River Railway		ACL	1899	1899	Savannah, Florida and Western Railway	
Jacksonville and Southwestern Railroad		ACL	1899	1904	Atlantic Coast Line Railroad	
Jacksonville, Tampa and Key West Railway		ACL	1881	1899	Atlantic Coast Line Railroad, Jacksonville and St. John's River Railway	
Jacksonville Terminal Company	JTCO	ACL/ FEC/ SAL/ SOU	1894	1978	N/A	
Jaxport Terminal Railway	JXPT		1989	1996	Talleyrand Terminal Railroad	
Jupiter and Lake Worth Railway			1888	1895	N/A	
Kissimmee River Railway		SAL	1917		N/A	
Lake Monroe and Orlando Railroad		ACL	1875	1879	South Florida Railroad	
Lake Wimico and St. Joseph Canal and Railroad Company			1836	1841	N/A	
Leesburg and Indian River Railroad		SAL	1881	1884	Florida Railway and Navigation Company	
Live Oak and Gulf Railway			1894	1904	Suwannee and San Pedro Railroad	
Live Oak and Perry Railroad		SOU	1903	1905	Live Oak, Perry and Gulf Railroad	
Live Oak, Perry and Georgia Railroad			1995	1999	Georgia and Florida RailNet	
Live Oak, Perry and Gulf Railroad		SOU	1905	1971	Live Oak, Perry and South Georgia Railway	
Live Oak, Perry and South Georgia Railway	LPSG	SOU	1971	1993	Georgia Southern and Florida Railway	
Live Oak and Rowland's Bluff Railroad		ACL	1881	1884	Savannah, Florida and Western Railway	
Live Oak, Tampa and Charlotte Harbor Railroad		ACL	1881	1884	Savannah, Florida and Western Railway	
Louisville and Nashville Railroad	L&N, LN	L&N	1880	1983	Seaboard System Railroad	
Macon and Florida Air Line Railroad		SOU	1884	1889	Georgia Southern and Florida Railroad	
Madison Southern Railway				1922	N/A	
Marianna and Blountstown Railroad	M&BT, MBT		1909	1972	N/A	
Muscle Shoals, Birmingham and Pensacola Railroad	MSBP	SLSF	1924	1928	St. Louis – San Francisco Railway	
Muscle Shoals, Birmingham and Pensacola Railway	MSBP	SLSF	1922	1924	Muscle Shoals, Birmingham and Pensacola Railroad	
Naples, Seaboard, and Gulf Railway		SAL	1926		Seaboard Air Line Railroad	
Ocala Northern Railroad			1909	1915	Ocklawaha Valley Railroad	
Ocala and Southwestern Railroad				1923	N/A	
Ocklawaha Valley Railroad			1915	1922	N/A	
Okeechobee Railroad					N/A	
Orange Belt Railway		ACL	1885	1893	Sanford and St. Petersburg Railroad	
Orange Ridge, DeLand and Atlantic Railroad		ACL	1880	1886	DeLand and St. John's River Railroad	
Orlando and Winter Park Railway		SAL	1886	1891	East Florida and Atlantic Railroad	
Ormond Bridge Company		FEC	1887	1898	Florida East Coast Railway	
Osceola and Lake Jesup Railway		SAL	1889	1891	East Florida and Atlantic Railroad	
Palatka Bridge Company		FEC	1888	1893	Jacksonville, St. Augustine and Indian River Railway	
Palatka and Indian River Railway		ACL	1881	1887	Jacksonville, Tampa and Key West Railway	
Patterson and McInnis Sawmill Railway	P&M			1940	Georgia-Pacific	Former logging railroad
Pelham and Havana Railroad			1906	1923	N/A	
Peninsular Railroad		SAL	1878	1883	Florida Transit and Peninsular Railroad	
Pensacola Railroad		L&N	1877	1880	Louisville and Nashville Railroad	
Pensacola, Alabama and Tennessee Railroad		SLSF	1892	1915	Pensacola, Mobile and New Orleans Railway	
Pensacola and Atlantic Railroad		L&N	1881	1891	Louisville and Nashville Railroad	
Pensacola and Fort Barrancas Railroad		L&N	1870	1882	Florida Western Railroad	
Pensacola Electric Company			1906			
Pensacola Electric Terminal Railway			1897	1906	Pensacola Electric Company	
Pensacola and Georgia Railroad		SAL	1853	1869	Atlantic and Gulf Railroad, Tallahassee Railroad	
Pensacola and Louisville Railroad		L&N	1868	1878	Pensacola Railroad	
Pensacola and Mobile Railroad and Manufacturing Company		L&N	1861	1881	Louisville and Nashville Railroad	
Pensacola, Mobile and New Orleans Railway		SLSF	1907	1917	Gulf Ports Terminal Railway	
Pensacola and Perdido Railroad		SLSF	1869	1915	Pensacola, Mobile and New Orleans Railway	
Pensacola Street Car Company			1882	1891	Pensacola Terminal Company	
Pensacola Terminal Company			1891	1897	Pensacola Electric Terminal Railway	
Plant System		ACL	1894	1902	Atlantic Coast Line Railroad	
Plant City, Arcadia, and Gulf Railroad		SAL	1905	1909	Seaboard Air Line Railway	former logging railroad
Port Inglis Terminal Company		SAL		1916	Florida Central and Gulf Railway	
Port St. Joe Dock and Terminal Railway			1912	1929	N/A	
St. Andrews Bay Railway and Terminal Company			1914			
St. Augustine and Halifax River Railway		FEC	1889	1893	Jacksonville, St. Augustine and Indian River Railway	
St. Augustine and Palatka Railway		FEC	1886	1889	St. Augustine and Halifax River Railway	
St. Augustine and South Beach Railway			1886			
St. Cloud and Sugar Belt Railway		ACL	1888	1893	South Florida Railroad	
St. Johns Railway		FEC	1858	1893	Jacksonville, St. Augustine and Indian River Railway	
St. Johns and Halifax Railway		FEC	1881	1888	St. Johns and Halifax River Railway	
St. Johns and Halifax River Railway		FEC	1888	1893	Jacksonville, St. Augustine and Indian River Railway	
St. John's and Lake Eustis Railroad		ACL	1896	1902	Atlantic Coast Line Railroad	
St. John's and Lake Eustis Railway		ACL	1879	1896	St. John's and Lake Eustis Railroad	
St. Johns River Terminal Company	SJRT	SOU	1901			
St. Louis – San Francisco Railway	SLSF	SLSF	1928	1980	Burlington Northern Inc.	
Sanford and Everglades Railroad		ACL	1908	1913	Atlantic Coast Line Railroad	
Sanford and Indian River Railroad		ACL	1881	1893	South Florida Railroad	
Sanford and Lake Eustis Railroad		ACL	1885	1890	Jacksonville, Tampa and Key West Railway	
Sanford and St. Petersburg Railroad		ACL	1893	1903	Atlantic Coast Line Railroad	
Savannah, Florida and Western Railway		ACL	1876	1902	Atlantic Coast Line Railroad	
Seaboard Air Line Railroad	SAL	SAL	1946	1967	Seaboard Coast Line Railroad	
Seaboard Air Line Railway		SAL	1900	1945	Seaboard Air Line Railroad	
Seaboard-All Florida Railway		SAL	1925	1945	Seaboard Air Line Railroad	
Seaboard Coast Line Railroad	SCL		1967	1983	Seaboard System Railroad	
Seaboard System Railroad	SBD		1983	1986	CSX Transportation	
Silver Springs, Ocala and Gulf Railroad		ACL	1875	1901	Savannah, Florida and Western Railway	
Silver Springs and Western Railroad	SS&W	SAL	1895	1909	acquired by Ocala Northern Railroad	
South Central Florida Railroad	SCFE		1990	1994	South Central Florida Express, Inc.	
South Florida Railroad		ACL	1879	1893	Savannah, Florida and Western Railway	
South Florida and Gulf Railroad			1914	1918	N/A	
South Georgia Railway		SOU	1900	1971	Live Oak, Perry and South Georgia Railway	
Southeastern Railway		FEC	1899	1902	Florida East Coast Railway	
Southwestern Railroad			1892	1899	N/A	
Standard and Hernando Railroad		SAL	1903	1916	Florida Central and Gulf Railway	
Starke and Sampson City Railroad		SAL	1890		Atlantic, Suwannee River and Gulf Railway	
Suwannee and San Pedro Railroad			1900	1905	Florida Railway	
Tallahassee Railroad		SAL	1834	1870	Jacksonville, Pensacola and Mobile Railroad	
Tallahassee, Perry and Southeastern Railway		SAL	1905	1909	Seaboard Air Line Railway	
Tallahassee Southeastern Railway		SAL	1895	1906	Tallahassee, Perry and Southeastern Railway	
Tampa and Gulf Coast Railroad		SAL	1913	1976	Seaboard Coast Line Railroad	
Tampa and Gulf Coast Railway		SAL	1909	1913	Tampa and Gulf Coast Railroad	
Tampa and Jacksonville Railway		SAL	1906	1927	Jacksonville, Gainesville and Gulf Railway	
Tampa Northern Railroad	TN	SAL	1906	1946	Seaboard Air Line Railroad	
Tampa, Peace Creek and St. John's River Railroad		ACL	1878	1881	Jacksonville, Tampa and Key West Railway	
Tampa Southern Railroad	TAS	ACL	1917	1982	Atlantic Coast Line Railroad	
Tampa Terminal Company		SAL	1906			
Tampa and Thonotosassa Railroad		ACL	1893	1901	Savannah, Florida and Western Railway	
Tampa Union Station Company		ACL/ SAL	1910	1968	N/A	
Tavares, Apopka and Gulf Railroad		SAL	1881	1890	Tavares and Gulf Railroad	
Tavares and Gulf Railroad	TV&G	SAL	1890	1969	Seaboard Coast Line Railroad	
Tavares, Eustis & Gulf Railroad	TE&G		2011	2017		
Tavares, Orlando and Atlantic Railroad		SAL	1881	1891	Florida Central and Peninsular Railroad	
Thomasville, Tallahassee and Gulf Railroad		SAL	1882	1888	Augusta, Tallahassee and Gulf Railroad	
Trans-Florida Central Railroad			1924	1953	N/A	
Tropical Florida Railroad		SAL	1881	1883	Florida Transit and Peninsular Railroad	
United States and West Indies Railroad and Steamship Company		SAL	1900	1903	Florida West Shore Railway	
Valdosta Southern Railroad	VSO		1951	1972	N/A	
Valdosta Southern Railway		G&F	1895	1907	Georgia and Florida Railway	
Watertown and Northern Railway						
West Coast Railway		SOU	1900	1924	South Georgia Railway	
West India Fruit and Steamship Company	WIF		1946	1961	N/A	
Western Railway of Florida			1886	1892	Southwestern Railroad	Leased the Green Cove and Midland Railway
Winston and Bone Valley Railroad		ACL	1892	1909	Atlantic Coast Line Railroad	
Withlacoochee Railway		G&F	1893	1895	Valdosta Southern Railway	
Yalaha and Western Railroad		ACL	1900	1902	Atlantic Coast Line Railroad	
Yellow River Railroad		SAL	1887	1906	Louisville and Nashville Railroad	
