= Ocilla, Pinebloom and Valdosta Railroad =

The Ocilla, Pinebloom and Valdosta Railroad was a railroad company in Georgia. It was a common carrier only from 1901 to 1906, and from 1916 to 1918. During other times of its short life, it was only used as a logging railroad.

== History ==
The railroad was originally founded as Fitzgerald, Pinebloom and Valdosta Railway, planning a railroad between its namesake towns of Fitzgerald and Valdosta. It never reached either of them. The company was owned by the Gray Lumber Company, and B. B. Gray became its president. Before the first section opened, plans were revised and the northern terminus of the line was now supposed to be Ocilla. The company was renamed to Ocilla, Pinebloom and Valdosta Railway in 1901. That same year, the first section opened from Pinebloom, where it connected to the Atlantic Coast Line Railroad and where the headquarters of the company was situated, to Nashville, a distance of 20 miles. By January 1904, the line was extended north from Pinebloom via Willacoochee to Lax, another 14 miles. Trains had to change directions at Pinebloom. Two pairs of trains were travelling the line then. A daily train (no. 1/2) ran between Willacoochee and Nashville, leaving Willacoochee at 9:30 am, arriving in Nashville at 10:50 am. It returned from there at 2:45 pm, arriving in Willacoochee again at 4:05 pm. Another train, no. 3/4, was not operated on Sundays, and started at 6:30 am in Pinebloom, arriving in Lax at 8:45 am. It returned from there at 9:45 am and was back in Pinebloom at noon. The planned extension to Ocilla was never built, that to Valdosta was built at that time by the Douglas, Augusta and Gulf Railway.

The Georgia and Florida Railway planned to build its mainline through Willacoochee and sought to acquire existing railroads along its way. In 1906, the Ocilla, Pinebloom and Valdosta sold its section between Leliaton and Nashville to the Douglas, Augusta & Gulf that was absorbed by the Georgia&Florida the following year and later became part of the Southern Railway network. This section is still operated today, now by the Georgia and Florida Railway of 2005. As the Georgia&Florida built its own line through Willacoochee and connected to the existing trackage in Leliaton, rather than using the Ocilla, Pinebloom and Valdosta's trackage, the latter's section between Pinebloom and Leliaton became obsolete. With these changes, only the trackage between Lax and Pinebloom remained. Passenger traffic ended on this line, and it was used only as logging railroad by its parent lumber company.

At the same time, another company, later known as the Ocilla Southern Railroad, planned a railroad from Ocilla south to Nashville that would run only a few miles further west, but on a more direct route. The company gave up on the plan to build its own line to Ocilla, and instead constructed a direct connection to the Ocilla Southern at a station called Gladys, situated where that railroad crossed Gladys Highway. This extension was opened around 1908. In 1910, the company was renamed to Ocilla, Pinebloom and Valdosta Railroad. Gray sold his lumber business, including the railroad, to the Henderson Lumber Co. in 1915. Reason Henderson became the new president of the railroad, and the general offices of the company were moved to Willacoochee. Henderson himself was based in Ocilla. Henderson extended the railroad beyond Pinebloom and the tracks reached Shaw's Still in early 1916, about eight miles from Pinebloom. In May 1916, the railroad once again became a common carrier, but this time for freight service only.

The line did not prove successful, and was once again sold, in 1918, to the Willacoochee and DuPont Railroad, which planned to build from Shaw's Still to Du Pont, where it would connect to another line of the Atlantic Coast Line Railroad. The new owner abandoned the section between Gladys and Willacoochee in 1919, and the railroad ceased to be used as common carrier again. Due to the shift from rail to road traffic after World War I, the Du Pont extension was never pursued, and the short stretch between Willacoochee and Shaw's Still was abandoned in 1922.
