= Withlacoochee =

Withlacoochee may refer to:

- Battle of Withlacoochee, battle of the Second Seminole War on December 31, 1835
- Wildwood, Lady Lake, Withlacoochee and Gulf Railway, incorporated under Florida state law chapter 3656, approved February 16, 1885
- Withlacoochee, Plant City and Boca Grande Railroad, created with the approval of Florida state law chapter 4258, on May 31, 1893
- Withlacoochee Railway, incorporated under Florida state law chapter 4256, approved May 24, 1893
- Withlacoochee River (Suwannee River) originates in Georgia, northwest of Valdosta
- Withlacoochee River (Florida) originates in central Florida's Green Swamp, east of Polk City
- Withlacoochee State Forest, in the U.S. state of Florida
- Withlacoochee State Trail, a 46-mile (74 km) long paved, multi-use, non-motorized rail trail in Florida
