= List of Florida street railroads =

This is a list of street railroad operating in Florida in the United States.

== Horse car companies ==
Railways using horse or mule power

- Altamonte Springs Street Railway
- Arcadia Street Railway and Improvement Company
- Avon Park Street Railway
- Bartow Street Railway
- Breakers Hotel Street Railway
- Cappo's South Beach Railway Anastasia Island
- East Florida Land and Produce Company
- Fort Myers Street Railway
- Fort Meade Street Railway
- Gainesville City and Suburban Railway
- Georgetown Tramway
- Green Cove Springs Street Railway
- Jacksonville and La Villa Street Railway Company
- Jacksonville and Suburban Railway
- Jacksonville Street Railroad
- Leesburg Transfer Company
- Longwood Horse Railway
- Main Street Railroad
- Main Street Railway
- Ocala, Silver Springs and Park Street Railroad
- Ocala Street and Suburban Railroad
- Orlando Street Railway
- Ormond Hotel Street Railway
- Palatka and Heights Street Railway
- Pensacola Street Car Company
- People's Railroad
- Pine Street Railway
- Sopchoppy-Panacea Street Railway
- St. Augustine and North Beach Railway
- Tallahassee Street Railway
- Tampa Street Railway
- Winter Park Street Railway, also known as The Seminole Hotel Street Railway

== Electric street railways ==
Railways using overhead electric or storage battery power.

- Central of Florida Railway
- Consumers' Electric Light and Street Railroad Company
- Consumers' Electric Light and Street Railway Company
- Coral Gables Rapid Transit Corporation
- Duval Traction Company
- Everglades City Street Railway
- Fernandina and Amelia Beach Railway
- Florida Power and Light
- Jacksonville Electric Company
- Florida Power and Light Company
- Jacksonville Traction Company
- Key West Street Car Company
- Main Street Railway
- Miami Beach Electric Company
- The City of Miami
- North Jacksonville Street Railway, Town and Improvement Company
- Ortega Traction Company
- Palm Beach Railway and Power Company
- Pensacola Electric Company
- Pensacola Electric Terminal Railway Company
- Pensacola Street Railway Company
- Pensacola Terminal Company
- Sanford and Everglades Railroad
- South Jacksonville Municipal Railways
- St. Augustine and South Beach Railway
- St. Johns Traction Company
- Tampa Electric Company (actually TECO Line Streetcar)
- Tampa Street Railway Company
- Tampa Suburban Company

== Interurban passenger, freight and/or electric freight railways ==
Electric railways which operated between towns or special industrial connections.

- International Agricultural Corporation
- Manatee Light and Traction Company
- St. Augustine and South Beach Railway
- St. Augustine and North Beach Railway
- Sanford Traction Company Wholly owned by the Sanford and Everglades Railroad.
- Pensacola Electric Terminal Railroad

== Electric interurban railway projects ==
Electric railways planned but never completed.

- Florida Interurban Railway and Tunnel
- Jacksonville, Miami & Tampa Interurban Railway
- Jacksonville & St. Augustine Public Service Corporation
- Perry & Gulf Coast Traction

== See also ==
- List of town tramway systems in the United States#Florida
