= Enterprise junction =

Enterprise junction may refer to:

- Enterprise Junction, former name of Benson Junction, Florida
- Enterprise Junction, a New Jersey railroad junction
- Enterprise Junction, a road junction in Washington County, Utah
