= History of African Americans in Jacksonville =

African-Americans have made considerable contributions to the history and development of Jacksonville, Florida. According to the U.S. Census Bureau, African-Americans make up 30.7% of the city's population.

== History ==
=== Arrival ===
In 1562 Jean Ribault, a French Huguenot explored the St. Johns River and made contact with the native Timucuan people. Ribault and the French Huguenots built Fort Caroline along the river at St. Johns Bluff in their first attempts to establish a permanent colony in Florida.

St. Augustine, which is the oldest continually occupied settlement in the United States, was founded by Spanish leader Pedro Menéndez de Avilés in 1565 as a base to attack the French-controlled Fort Caroline. Menéndez de Avilés's attack on Ribault and the French Huguenots solidified Spanish control over Florida.

According to the National Park Service, the Spanish were accompanied by both free and enslaved Africans who worked on early fortifications; sawed timber; built churches, a blacksmith shop, and an artillery platform; and cleared land to grow crops.

The Spanish based their concept of slavery on ancient Roman beliefs which had been codified into the Siete Partidas in the 13th century. The Siete Partidas "held that slavery was an unnatural condition, for God had created man free, and it established ways in which enslaved people could become free."

=== Africans in early Florida ===
In October 1687, the first fugitive slaves — eight men, two women and a three-year-old child — escaped from Carolina, a British colony, and arrived in Florida. Colonial Spain granted emancipation to enslaved Africans who were willing to convert to Catholicism. As a result, many more enslaved Africans escaped from the Carolinas and found refuge in Florida. In 1738, Governor Manuel de Montiano gave this growing group a plot of land north of St. Augustine, where they established the first African free settlement in North America, called Graciela Real de Santa Teresa de Mose — eventually shortened as Fort Mose. The community held thirty-eight men and about sixty of their family members. Men were required to serve in the militia on behalf of St. Augustine and to defend their community in times of attack. The militia leader and one of the founding settlers was Francisco Menendez, who had been captured and enslaved as a boy in West Africa and escaped from the Carolinas.

In 1763, the Spanish traded Florida to Great Britain in exchange for Manila, in the Philippines, and Havana, Cuba. After the treaty was signed, African settlers at Fort Mose as well as all the inhabitants of St. Augustine evacuated for Cuba.

At the conclusion of the American Revolution, Florida came back into Spanish hands from the British. At this time, approximately 20% of the African population in Florida was emancipated. In 1790, President Thomas Jefferson urges the Spanish to rescind their previous policy permitting enslaved people to attain free status upon religious conversion. The United States then passes the Fugitive Slave Act three years later, which demands the return of all escaped slaves.

=== Control by the United States ===
In 1821, the Adams–Onís Treaty ceded Florida to the United States. While the treaty recognized the rights of free Africans, the population was now subjected to new harsh laws. African-Americans were forbidden from carrying firearms, serving on juries, or testifying against whites. They were taxed unfairly and had a curfew. They could be whipped for misdemeanors and impressed and forced back in slavery to meet the cost of debts and fines, and interracial marriage was banned. By 1860, the U.S. Census Bureau listed nearly 63,000 African-Americans in Florida, of which 62,000 were enslaved.

Ennis Davis of the Jaxson writes:

Founded by Isaiah D. Hart in 1822, Jacksonville grew into an antebellum river port where enslaved African laborers worked as loggers, turpentiners, pilots, stevedores, carpenters, masons, and mill hands. It was also a hub for shipping agricultural products from surrounding plantations to market. After the Civil War, Jacksonville developed into a major regional railroad center and a popular tourist destination during the Gilded Age. For Gullah Geechee descendants in Florida, Georgia, and South Carolina, Jacksonville was known as the “Magic City” during an era when African Americans flocked to the city seeking economic opportunities. By 1900, African Americans made up 57% of Jacksonville’s population, setting it apart from the racial demographics of other Southern cities at the time.

=== Reconstruction and Jim Crow ===
In 1877, while the State of Florida began passing restrictive laws that reduced the rights for African-Americans, Jacksonville remained a relative oasis due to the political power in the city that had been amassed by Black citizens. In December of that year, a progressive multiracial government won city elections, leading to the Jacksonville's first Black police commissioner, municipal judge, and city marshal, plus 5 African Americans elected to city council seats. However, after an epidemic of yellow fever broke out in the city in 1888, multiple city leaders died, and others left, allowing the state to take control of the city. racial violence and discrimination remained prevalent. The state then introduced poll taxes, and established Jim Crow laws in the city, which would stay in place even when the city once again governed itself.

By the year 1900, though Jacksonville was a majority Black city, most African-American residents lived in poverty and attended segregated schools while the white minority controlled the government and major industry. The Black mortality rate was almost twice as the white population, and suffered from more illness — in part because the Hansontown neighborhood, which was largely poor and Black, lacked a sewer system, causing dangerously unsanitary conditions.

In the Jim Crow era, violence and racial discrimination against African-Americans was rampant in Florida, including Jacksonville. More African American males would be lynched per capita in Florida then any other Southern state — one in every 1,250 African-Americans. In 1912, Eugene Baxter, a Black Jacksonville resident, was charged with robbing and killing a white grocer. While Baxter and his codefendants were transferred to South Carolina for trial (ultimately found guilty and sentenced to death), Jacksonville native James Weldon Johnson, a Black journalist and author associated with the Harlem Renaissance, stepped in as a peacemaker to try and prevent white mobs from attacking Black residents.

On September 8, 1919, two Black men and World War I veterans, Bowman Cook and John Morine, were taken by a mob of white men from the Duval County jail and shot to death.

=== Civil Rights era in Jacksonville ===
On August 27, 1960, about 200 white men, some of whom were members of the Ku Klux Klan, used ax handles and baseball bats to attack unarmed civil rights protestors who were conducting sit-ins, in what would be called Ax Handle Saturday. The sit-ins, orchestrated by 16-year-old Rodney Hurst, who headed the youth council of the local NAACP, had been taking place at local Woolworth and Grant's department store counters when the attacks broke out. White men attacked the youth, as well as any other Black people they saw, while police were reported to have stood back and watched until a Black street gang, the Boomerangs, got involved. In 2000, Alton Yates, who had been one of the NAACP youth organizers, told the Florida Times-Union that "I really did not think adults would attack children with baseball bats and ax handles. That was particularly unreal to me. It was an horrific thing to watch." Ultimately, 50 people were injured and 62 were arrested.

In 1964, four white men shot and killed Johnnie Mae Chappell, a Jacksonville mother of ten who had just finished grocery shopping and was searching on the side of the road for a missing wallet. The men admitted that they had been looking "to find themselves a n---- to shoot". Although all four men confessed their roles to police and were indicted on first-degree murder charges, an all-white male jury convicted only one man — J.W. Rich — of manslaughter. He was sentenced to 10 years in prison, of which he served three years. Officials dropped charges against the other three men.

=== Jacksonville (1970–present) ===
In the 1970s, Black residents of Jacksonville continued to face challenges, given the backlash to busing to facilitate school desegregation. Additionally, newly constricted highways cut right through historic Black neighborhoods like Durkeeville, irrevocably disrupting businesses and communities.

In 1986, the Jacksonville Free Press was established to serve the African-American community.

In 2011, Jacksonville elected its first Black mayor, Alvin Brown, who served until 2015. He later became a member of the National Transportation Safety Board under President Biden.

== Notable African-American landmarks ==
=== Kingsley Plantation ===
The Kingsley Plantation is the site of a former Spanish colonial slavery plantation that was owned by Zephaniah Kingsley. The primary business at the plantation was the buying and selling of slaves; to a lesser extent, the plantation also raised cotton and a small amount of produce. Kingsley was a slave trader and a merchant who purchased 13-year-old Anna Madgigine Jai, who had been captured from West Africa, impregnated and married her. They had four children in total. In 1811, when Anna turned 18, Kingsley authorized her to run his East Florida plantations and she became a slave owner herself. After Spanish control reverted to the US in 1821, the Kingsleys surrendered their land. Today, the Kingsley Plantation is a historic landmark in Jacksonville, Florida.

=== Stanton College Preparatory School ===
The Stanton College Preparatory School started as a segregated elementary school for African-American children in 1860, but now serves as a high school for grades 9–12. Originally called the Florida Institute, Stanton Preparatory School was started by a group of former slaves to educate their children. The Freedmen's Bureau donated $16,000 to build the school with the purpose of training African-American women from ages 16–25 to be educators. As of 2021, the school is ranked 62nd of high schools in the United States and fifth in the state of Florida.

=== J.P. Small Memorial Stadium ===
Barrs Field, a ball park and facility which eventually became J.P. Small Memorial Stadium, was constructed in 1912 and first housed the Jacksonville Athletics, an African-American baseball club. The first municipal recreation field in the city of Jacksonville, the field was used by the Jacksonville Tars as well as the Jacksonville Red Caps of the Negro American League. The field was also eventually utilized for spring training by Major League Baseball teams (New York Giants, Brooklyn Dodgers, and more). The most notable African American to play on this field was Hank Aaron who played for the Jacksonville Braves.

== Notable people ==
- Mary McLeod Bethune – educator, Civil Rights activist (1875–1955)
- Alvin Brown – first African-American mayor of Jacksonville (born 1961)
- Corrine Brown – former U.S. congressional representative (born 1946)
- LeRoy Butler - NFL Hall of Famer (born 1968)
- Brian Dawkins – NFL player (born 1973)
- Artis Gilmore – NBA player (born 1949)
- Bob Hayes – NFL player, Olympic gold medalist sprinter (1942–2002)
- Derrick Henry – NFL player (born 1994)
- James Weldon Johnson – novelist and activist (1871–1938)
- Mase - rapper (born 1975)
- A. Philip Randolph – Civil Rights activist (1889–1979)
