= North Jacksonville Street Railway, Town and Improvement Company =

American Railway Company for black citizens

- Type: Street railway company
- Industry: Public transportation
- Founded: 1902
- Founder: R.R. Robinson
- Defunct: 1936 (routes abandoned)
- Fate: Acquired by Jacksonville Electric Company (later Jacksonville Traction Company)
- Key people: R.R. Robinson, H. Mason, F. C. Eleves, Walter P. Mucklow, George E. Ross, Frank P. McDermott, Telfair Stockton
- Services: Passenger streetcar service

The North Jacksonville Street Railway, Town and Improvement Company was promoted in the early 1900s by R. R. Robinson to be built, owned and operated by the black citizens of Jacksonville, Florida, to link the northwestern part of the city with downtown.

== Organisation and franchise ==
Organized by several prominent members of Jacksonville's black community, it was known as "The Colored Man's Railroad." The company received a franchise from the City Council on July 1, 1902, to build the line from Bay Street north on Clay to State and out the Kings Road to the city limits along what is now Myrtle Avenue, and returning via Moncrief Road to downtown through Hansontown. In May 1903, the Council granted an addition to the franchise allowing a line east on State to Washington to Jessie, terminating at Talleyrand Avenue in the Oakland neighborhood.

The franchise was good for thirty years, with the city having an option to buy. The original line opened on Saturday, August 22, 1903, with hundreds of Jacksonville's black population lining up for a ride on "their" streetcars, operated with black motormen and conductors. The official opening was on August 24, with music and refreshment at Mason's Park (owned by the road) and speeches by several dignitaries, including Mayor George M. Nolan and former Mayor Duncan U. Fletcher.

== Leadership and structure ==
The directors were R. R. Robinson, H. Mason, F. C. Eleves, Walter P. Mucklow, George E. Ross and Frank P. McDermott. A majority of the board wanted the company to be a closely held corporation, but Robinson disagreed: he wanted the shares to be freely available to the general public.

== Failed share offers, sale to Telfair Stockton ==
The city franchise required that the lines be completed within a year of the amended ordinance, but money problems delayed the extension to Oakland. In August 1904 the Council granted an extension to May 1, 1905. Robinson then incorporated the Atlantic & Pacific Street Railway and Securities Company in New Jersey to take over the North Jacksonville and complete the lines. He offered shares at one dollar to get as many local citizens to invest as possible, giving them an interest in the success of the line. This effort failed and the company was eventually sold to Telfair Stockton and his associates, thus passing out of control of the black community. Stockton built the authorized extensions, bringing the road to 6.4 miles (10.3 km) with seven cars.

== Failure and last lines ==
Stockton, a former state legislator and prominent developer, had no particular interest in running a street railway and soon sold the property to the Jacksonville Electric Company (later renamed Jacksonville Traction Company). The black community relied heavily on the former North Jacksonville lines, and they were among the last routes to be abandoned, in December 1936.

== See also ==
- List of Florida street railroads
