= Fort Meade Street Railway =

Defunct railway

The Fort Meade Street Railway was a railway in Florida, United States, chartered in January 1886 with a 99-year franchise. It opened on January 1, 1887, to connect the center of Fort Meade and the new Florida Southern Railway depot. The charter granted it the exclusive right-of-way in Fort Meade and exempted it from city taxes for ten years. The railroad had two miles of 3 ft (914 mm) narrow gauge track and owned two cars and two horses.

In 1904 the directors were Max Reif (President), M. M. Loadhollis (Vice-President), W. H. Francis (Secretary), L. B. Flood, E. O. Flood (Treasurer) and J. G. Carter (Manager). C. E. Roberts is shown as Vice-President in the 1907 Poor's Manual with the other officers being the same. The general offices were in Fort Meade.

Operations ceased in 1913.

== See also ==
- List of Florida street railroads
