= Palatka and Heights Street Railway =

Streetcar system in Palatka, Florida

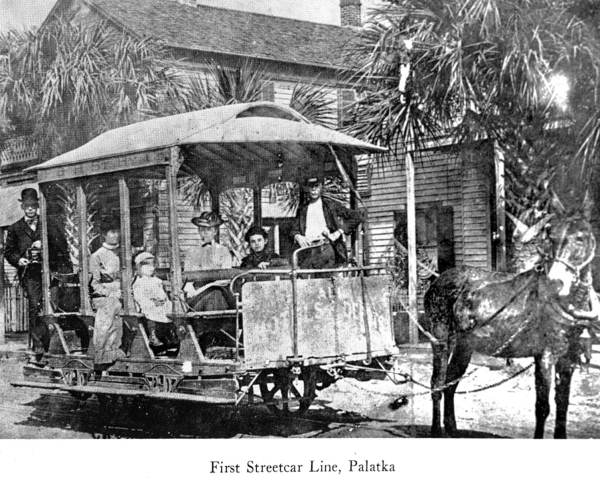
Streetcar on the Palatka and Heights Street Railway

The Palatka and Heights Street Railway was a streetcar system in Palatka, Florida, chartered in March 1888 with a 50-year franchise. It opened in January 1889, with three miles of 3 ft (914 mm) narrow gauge track. In 1904 it is shown as owning two cars and two horses, though common practice in the South was to use mules rather than horses, and pictures in the Florida State Archives show the P&HSRy car pulled by mules.

The directors were: Wm. H. Craig, of Orange, New Jersey, President; Thomas Murray, Secretary; E. S. Crill, Treasurer; Henry S. Wilson; Wm. P. Craig. The general offices were in Palatka, Florida. and J. G. Carter, Manager. Photographs in the Florida State Archives show the tracks on Emmett Avenue and Lemon Street.

== See also ==
- List of Florida street railroads
