= Georgia and Florida Railway =

Georgia and Florida Railway or Georgia and Florida Railroad may refer to:

- Georgia and Florida Railway (2005), earlier known as Georgia and Florida RailNet (1999-2005) and Georgia and Florida Railroad (1995-1999)
- Georgia and Florida Railroad (1926–1963), known as the Georgia and Florida Railway from 1906 to 1926 and 1963 to 1971
