= Jacksonville, Tampa and Key West Railway =

Historic railroad in Florida

Overview
- Locale: Florida
- Dates of operation: 1879–1899
- Successor: Plant System; Atlantic Coast Line Railroad; Seaboard Coast Line Railroad; CSX Transportation

Technical
- Track gauge: 4 ft 8 1/2 in (1,435 mm) standard gauge
- Previous gauge: 5 ft (1,524 mm) (1883–1886)

The Jacksonville, Tampa and Key West Railway was a railroad and steamboat network in Florida at the end of the 19th century. Most of its lines became part of the Plant System in 1899 and the Atlantic Coast Line Railroad in 1902. The line remains in service today with a vast majority of it now being CSX Transportation's Sanford Subdivision.

== History ==
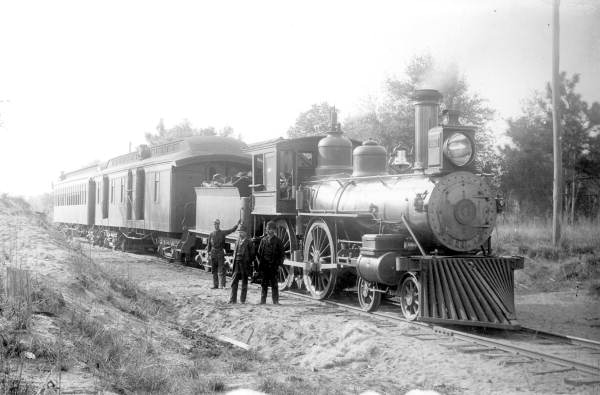
Train on the Jacksonville, Tampa and Key West Railway in 1885

The Tampa, Peace Creek and St. Johns River Railroad was incorporated in 1879, William Van Fleet as president and received a charter to build a railroad from Jacksonville to Tampa. The company, by way of congressional land grants thru the general assembly of Florida, by an act of January 6, 1855, 'to provide for and encourage a liberal system of internal improvements in the state,' declared that the lands granted to the state by the acts of congress of March 3, 1845, and September 28, 1850, together with the proceeds thereof, accrued or that might thereafter accrue, should be set apart and made a separate fund, to be called the internal improvement of the state; and that, for the purpose of assuring a proper application of the fund for the objects mentioned, the lands, and the funds arising from the sale thereof, after paying the necessary expenses of selection, management, and sale, should be vested in five trustees, to wit, in the governor of the state, the comptroller of public accounts, the state treasurer, the attorney general, and the register of state lands, and their successors in office, to hold the same for the uses provided in the act; and by its twenty-ninth section, the general assembly reserved the right to grant to such railroad companies, thereafter chartered, as they might deem proper, upon their compliance with the provisions of the act as to the manner of constructing the road and the drainage of the land, the alternate sections of the 'swamp and overflowed lands' for six miles on each side of the line of the road of any such company. That the Jacksonville, Tampa & Key West Railway Company was incorporated in March 1878, under the general corporation act of the state, of February 1874, by the name of the Tampa, Peace Creek & St. John's River Railroad Company. That the legislature of Florida, by act of March 4, 1879, granted to that company alternate sections of the lands given to the state by the act of congress of September 28, 1850, within six miles on each side of the track or line of its road, provided that the company should comply with the specified provisions of the act of January 6, 1855; and further granted to the company, in consideration of the greatly improved value which would accrue to the state from the construction of the road, 10,000 acres of the same class of lands for each mile of road it might construct, such lands to be of those nearest to the line of the road, its branches and extensions,—this last-named grant being made subject to the rights of all creditors of the internal improvement fund, and to the trusts to which the fund was applicable under the act of January 6, 1855. That on the 27th of June, 1881, the Tampa, Peace Creek & St. John's River Railroad Company, by a resolution of its board of directors, changed its corporate name to Jacksonville, Tampa & Key West Railway Company, and on the 23d of August, 1881, filed a plat of its route with the trustees of the internal improvement fund; and, on the 1st of September, 1881, the trustees passed a resolution reserving from sale for the benefit of the company the even-numbered sections of land for six miles on each side of its line; and, again, on the 21st of September, 1881, acting under the provisions of the act of the legislature of March 12, 1879, 'to amend section 26 of the act 'to provide a general law for the incorporation of railroads and canals,' and to grant aid to railroads and canals incorporated under said act,' they passed a resolution to reserve from sale, to further aid in the construction of the road, a quantity of land in the even-numbered sections within twenty miles of said road sufficient to supply the deficiency existing in the even-numbered sections within six miles of the road. In 1884, after earning its first land grant, pledged said property for collateral to secure a series of mortgage bonds, where the Mercantile Trust Co. would be trustee, these would be the series A and B first mortgage bonds, then in 1890, a Consolidated Mortgage was executed with the Pennsylvania Company for Insurances on Lives and Granting Annuities as trustee for the 4000 bondholders, where the Company's 1.5 million acres of land was to secure said bonds. The company would enter into Receivership under Mason Young, and later under Joseph H. Durkee, who executed a series of "receivers notes/certificate" which would become paramount lien on said 1.5 million acres, each certificate holder owning an undivided interest in said 1.5 million acres.

The Atlantic Coast, St. Johns and Indian River Railroad completed a line from Titusville, on the Indian River, to Enterprise, on the eastern shore of Lake Monroe opposite Sanford, in early 1886. The Jacksonville, Tampa and Key West Railway build a 3.9-mile (6.3 km) line to Enterprise from its mainline at Enterprise Junction. The Jacksonville, Tampa and Key West Railway then leased the Atlantic Coast, St. Johns and Indian River Railroad, and purchased all of its rolling stock. The Jacksonville, Tampa and Key West Railway operated the Enterprise to Titusville line as its Indian River Branch.

After leasing the Titusville–Enterprise line of the Atlantic Coast, St. Johns and Indian River Railroad, the Jacksonville, Tampa and Key West Railway began operating steamboats from its dock in Titusville down the Indian River to Jupiter. In December 1888, the Jacksonville, Tampa and Key West Railway established the Indian River Steamboat Company to operate the steamboats, with Mason Young, vice-president of the railway company, servicing as president of the steamboat company. The Jupiter and Lake Worth Railway opened in 1889 as a short connection between the Indian River Steamboat Company at Jupiter and the north end of Lake Worth, where steamers continued south. The line was abandoned by 1896 after the completion of the parallel Florida East Coast Railway.

The Orange Ridge, DeLand and Atlantic Railroad Company was a 3-foot gauge 6-mile (9.7 km) line built in 1885, connecting DeLand with DeLand Landing on the St. Johns River. The Jacksonville, Tampa and Key West line intersected it 2 miles (3.2 km) from DeLand Landing at DeLand Junction. The railroad was reincorporated in 1886 as the Deland and St. Johns River Railroad Company and converted to 5-foot gauge to match the Jacksonville, Tampa and Key West Railway.

In 1893 the JT&KW went bankrupt. The Southeastern Railway bought the line from Enterprise to Titusville in 1899, and later that year sold it to the Florida East Coast Railway. Also that year, the rest of the system was reincorporated as the Jacksonville and St. Johns River Railway and sold to the Savannah, Florida and Western Railway (the Plant System). The Plant System became part of the Atlantic Coast Line Railroad in 1902. In 1967 the ACL merged into the Seaboard Coast Line Railroad, eventually becoming part of CSX. The JT&KW is now part of the "A" Line, one of CSX's two main lines into Florida.

== Branches ==
=== DeLand ===
The Orange Ridge, DeLand and Atlantic Railroad was incorporated by Laws of Florida Chapter 3332, No. 114 on March 7, 1881, running from DeLand west across the JT&KW at DeLand Junction to the St. Johns River. It became the DeLand and St. Johns River Railroad in 1886, and the JT&KW bought it in 1890.

=== Enterprise ===
The Enterprise Branch ran from the main line at Benson Junction east to Enterprise. It continued to Titusville as the Atlantic Coast, St. Johns and Indian River Railroad, acquired in 1886. The Atlantic Coast, St. Johns and Indian River Railroad connected with the Florida East Coast Railway in Titusville. The Florida East Coast Railway later acquired the branch from Enterprise to Titusville in 1902.

=== Lake Eustis ===
The Sanford and Lake Eustis Railway was organized in 1886 and merged into the JT&KW on May 1, 1890. The line ran west from Sanford to Tavares on Lake Eustis.

== Current operations ==
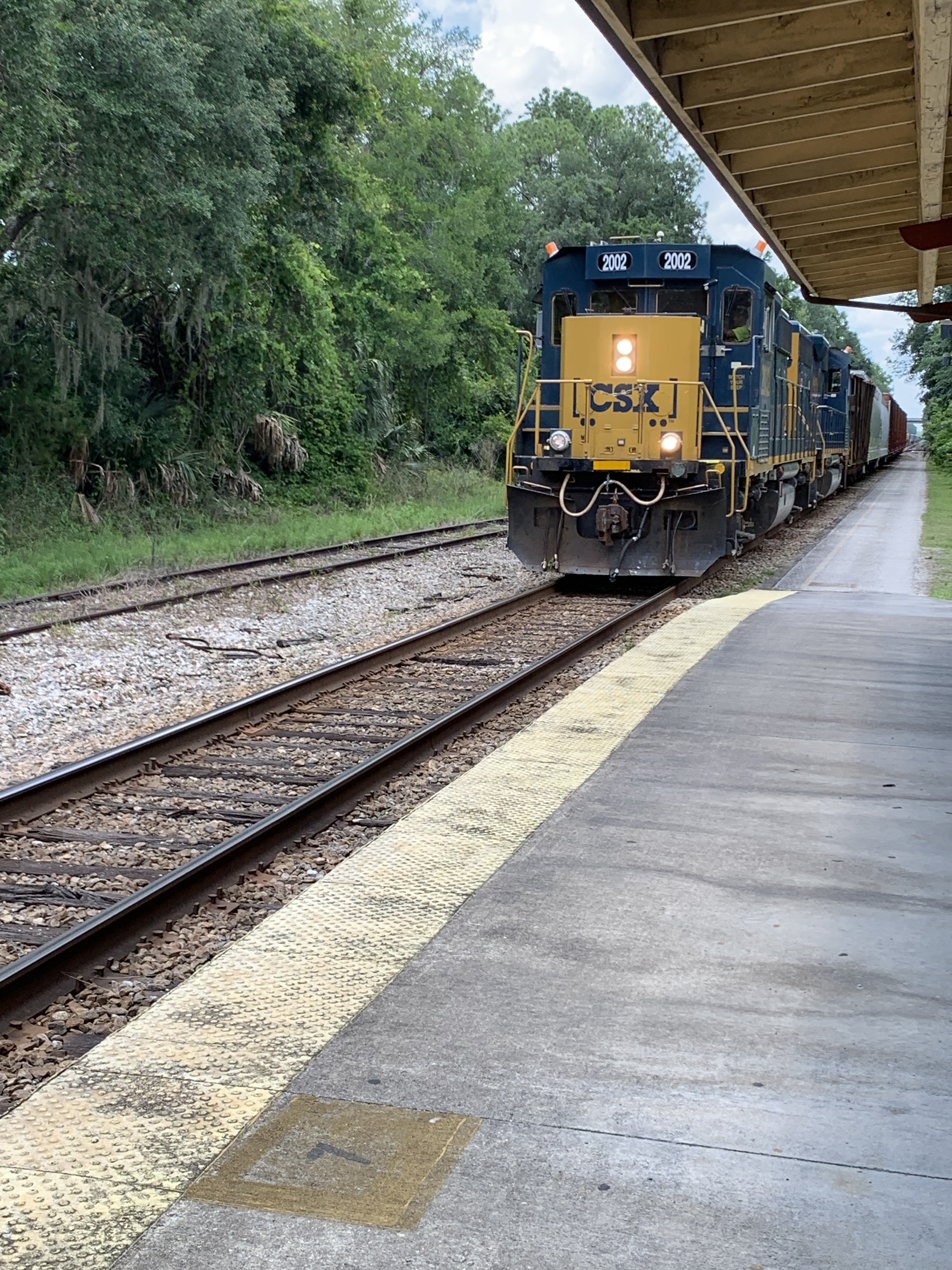
A CSX local freight passing through the DeLand station, May 16, 2019.

The Jacksonville, Tampa and Key West Railway remains in service and is today part of CSX's A Line. CSX has designated it as their Sanford Subdivision and Jacksonville Terminal Subdivision. Though as of 2011, the Florida Department of Transportation owns a short segment of the line south of Deland to Sanford and operates the SunRail commuter rail service over that segment. CSX still runs local freight on the line but all through freight trains have since been shifted to the S Line due to SunRail service. Prior to the sale of the southern portion of the line to FDOT, CSX's Sanford Subdivision continued south to Sanford and then along on the former South Florida Railroad as far as Auburndale.

Amtrak also uses the line for all of its Florida service including the Silver Meteor, Silver Star, and the Auto Train.

== Station listing ==
Milepost	City	Station	Connections and notes
A 643.7	Jacksonville	Jacksonville Terminal	union station
	Jacksonville	La Villa Junction	junction with: East Florida Railway (SF&W/ACL); Atlantic, Valdosta and Western Railway (SOU); Florida East Coast Railway; Florida Central and Western Railroad (FC&P/SAL); Fernandina and Jacksonville Railroad (FC&P/SAL)
	Jacksonville	Edgewood	
A 654.0	Jacksonville	Yukon	originally Black Point
		Reeds	
A 658.6	Orange Park	Orange Park	
A 663.6		Peoria	
A 665.1	Doctor's Inlet	Doctor's Inlet	
		Black Creek	
A 668.5		Russell	originally Fleming
A 671.8		Magnolia Springs	
A 672.6	Green Cove Springs	Green Cove Springs	
	Green Cove Springs	Melrose Crossing	junction with Green Cove Springs and Melrose Railroad
A 676.1		Walkill	
A 682.2		West Tocoi	
A 690.8	Bostwick	Bostwick	
A 693.8		Teasdale	
		Sauble	
A 698.0	Palatka	Palatka	Amtrak Silver Meteor and Silver Star junction with: Florida Southern Railway (ACL); Georgia Southern and Florida Railroad (SOU); Florida East Coast Railway Palatka Branch; Ocklawaha Valley Railroad
A 700.4		Lundy	
A 704.2		Peniel	
A 706.3		Buffalo Bluff	
A 708.1	Satsuma	Satsuma	
A 711.2	Sisco	Sisco	
A 712.2	Pomona Park	Pomona Park	originally Pomona
A 713.8	Lake Como	Lake Como	
A 716.7	Huntington	Huntington	
A 719.3	Crescent City	Crescent City	
A 720.4		Denver	
A 724.1		Hammond	
A 726.6	Seville	Seville	
		Bakersburg	
A 732.0	Pierson	Pierson	
		Eldridge	
A 737.9	Barberville	Barberville	
		Deep Creek	
A 743.1	DeLeon Springs	DeLeon Springs	originally Spring Garden
A 746.3		Glenwood	
		Highland Park	
A 750.0	DeLand	DeLand	Amtrak Silver Meteor and Silver Star originally DeLand Junction junction with DeLand and St. Johns River Railroad (JT&KW)
A 750.5		Beresford	
A 754.8	Orange City	Orange City Junction	junction with Atlantic and Western Railroad (FEC)
A 760.8		Enterprise Junction	later renamed Benson Junction junction with Enterprise Branch
A 763.7		Monroe	
A 766.3	Sanford	Sanford	Amtrak Auto Train junction with: South Florida Railroad (ACL, now CSX "A" Line); Sanford and Lake Eustis Railway (JT&KW/ACL); Sanford and Indian River Railroad (ACL); Orange Belt Railway (ACL)
