= Douglas, Augusta and Gulf Railway =

The Douglas, Augusta & Gulf Railway was created as a subsidiary of the Georgia & Florida Railway (G&F) to consolidate lines of several smaller railroads.

It started in 1905 by acquiring the Barrows Bluff to Douglas, Georgia line that was from the Wadley & Mt. Vernon Railroad. The next year it bought the Pinebloom to Nashville, Georgia section of the Ocilla, Pinebloom and Valdosta Railway. Shortly afterward it took control of the Broxton-Hazlehurst branch of the Ocilla & Valdosta Railroad. From there, the DA&G built a new line from Douglas to Garrant, Georgia giving the railroad a line from Hazelhurst to Nashville.

The DA&G was absorbed by the G&F in 1907.
