= Key West Street Car Company =

Defunct streetcar operator in Key West, United States

The Key West Street Car Company was incorporated by Florida state law chapter 3658, approved February 12, 1885, to establish a street railroad for public transportation in Key West, Florida.

The law stated the company had a right "to construct and operate a line of railway or railroads on any or all the streets in the city of Key West, as per charter granted by the Board of Aldermen of said city of Key West, Florida, and the right to extend or build said road upon any and all the avenues, streets or roads leading into said city of Key West, and upon all roads on the island of Key West; and said company shall further have the right to operate said line or lines of railroad, or any of them, with steam or horse power."

It was established and owned by Walter C. Maloney, Edward H. Gato, Lewis W. Pierce, George G. Watson, John White, and Charles B. Pendleton. Service began on May 25, 1884.

The company and horsecar service were acquired by the Key West Electric Company in 1898, which electrified the line the following year.

Streetcar service ceased in 1926.

== See also ==
- List of Florida street railroads
