= Jacksonville and Atlantic Railroad =

The Jacksonville and Atlantic Railroad is a railroad subsumed in 1899 into Florida East Coast Railway. The company was incorporated under the general incorporation laws of Florida for the purpose of constructing, maintaining and operating a railroad for public use in the conveyance of persons and property, from the south bank of the river St. Johns opposite the city of Jacksonville, Duval County, Florida, to a point on the Atlantic, at or near section 33, township 2, south, range 29, east. Florida state law chapter 3640, approved January 29, 1885, gave the company enlarged powers, including running boats across the St. Johns River.

The company was organized by John Q. Burbridge, J. J. Daniel, James M. Schumacher, H. S. Ely, F. F. L'engle, S. B. Hubbard, M. M. Drew, P. McQuaid, W. T. Forbes and W. A. McDuff. The 3 ft (914 mm) narrow gauge line was built with 35 pound rail and ran 16.25 miles from South Jacksonville to Pablo Beach.

The J&A was sold at foreclosure on December 5, 1892, and reorganized as the Jacksonville and Atlantic Railroad Company. In 1897, the new company's officers and directors were: J. W, Archibald, President and General Manager; B. P. Hazeltine, Vice-President; W. A. McDuff, Secretary and Treasurer; and W. B. Barnett, all of Jacksonville. The road owned two locomotives, five passenger coaches, one baggage car, and twelve freight cars.

In 1899 the J&A was bought by Henry Flagler, whose Florida East Coast Railway converted the line to 4 ft 8 1/2 in (1,435 mm) standard gauge and extended the line north to Mayport.

== See also ==
- List of defunct Florida railroads
