= Ocala Street and Suburban Railroad =

The Ocala Street and Suburban Railroad Company was incorporated on July 21, 1888 under the general incorporation laws of Florida. They were granted the exclusive right to operate a street railroad in Ocala, Florida by a town ordinance passed September 18, 1889.

Florida state law chapter 4268, approved June 1, 1893, verified the incorporation of the Ocala Street and Suburban Railroad Company, since there was some doubt as to whether it was strictly following the laws relating to the incorporation of railroad companies. At the time, about 3.5 miles of track had been built. The company was given the right "to construct, maintain and operate a line of railroad from the city of Ocala to Silver Springs, in said county, and from Silver Springs to Silver Springs Park, in said county, and through the streets of said towns of Silver Springs and Silver Springs Park, under such restrictions as may be made by law; and to operate the same by horse power, steam, cable, or electricity, as it may deem the most convenient."

Tracks were laid on Main Street and Magnolia Avenue for mule-drawn cars, and were removed before 1900.

== See also ==
- List of Florida street railroads
