= Palm Beach Railway and Power Company =

Florida railroad

The Palm Beach Railway and Power Company was a Florida railroad. It was incorporated under Florida state law chapter 4265, approved May 25, 1893, under the ownership of Edward Manrara, Candide A. M. Ybor and Emilio Pons, "to build, construct, purchase, own, maintain and operate a line or lines of street railway in the city of Tampa, on any street not already occupied by any other competing line of street railway; and may extend said railroad from said city of Tampa to any point on Hillsborough Bay, east of the Hillsborough River. And further, shall have the right and power to erect, construct, purchase, own and operate an electric light plant, in or out of said city of Tampa, for the purpose of furnishing said city and vicinity and the inhabitants thereof with electric lights."

The company was dissolved in 1992.

== See also ==
- List of Florida street railroads
