= Pine Street Railway =

The Pine Street Railway was a rail line in Jacksonville, Florida. It was built in the early 1880s by B. Upton and ran up Pine Street (now Main Street) to 8th Street. When the name of the street was changed to Main Street, the railroad followed suit and changed its name to Main Street Railway. Its tracks were originally 4 ft 8 1/2 in (1,435 mm) standard gauge, but when the Plant System took control of the line, it began to convert its tracks to 5 ft (1,524 mm) broad gauge in order to conform with the other Jacksonville Street Railways using that same gauge. The track gauge conversion process was completed in 1901.
