= Jacksonville Port Terminal Railroad =

Coordinates: 30.3552°N 81.6254°W

Overview
- Headquarters: Jacksonville, Florida
- Reporting mark: JXPT
- Locale: northeast of downtown Jacksonville, Florida
- Dates of operation: July 28, 1996–present

Technical
- Track gauge: 4 ft 8 1/2 in (1,435 mm) standard gauge

Other
- Website: www.watco.com

The Jacksonville Port Terminal Railroad (reporting mark JXPT) is a short line terminal railroad run by Watco. It serves the Jacksonville Port Authority and tenants with over ten miles of track. It has only one main line, running west from the Tallyrand Marine Terminal on the St Johns River to an interchange with CSX and Norfolk Southern northeast of downtown Jacksonville, Florida. Formerly known as the Talleyrand Terminal Railroad. Operations began on July 28, 1996, under that name. On March 8, 2017, Watco bought the railroad and renamed it the Jacksonville Port Terminal Railroad.
