= Hansontown =

American community

Hansontown was a community of working class African Americans in Jacksonville, Florida. It was razed in the 1940s in an urban redevelopment plan.

The Great Fire of 1901 hit the area. The North Jacksonville Street Railway, Town and Improvement Company planned a rail line to link downtown to Hansontown and other African American communities in Jacksonville. It had “shotgun rows”.

== See also ==
- Manhattan Beach (Florida)
- American Beach
