= Birmingham, Columbus and St. Andrews Railroad =

Defunct railroad in Florida

The Birmingham, Columbus and St. Andrews Railroad was a railroad running from Chipley, Florida to Southport, Florida. The railroad was chartered in 1903 and completed construction in 1912. The railroad was reorganized as the Alabama and Western Florida Railroad in 1926 and ceased operations in 1939.

The Birmingham, Columbus and St. Andrews Railroad was chartered in Alabama in 1903, and registered in Florida the same year. Construction started in Chipley that year, initially using a few miles of right-of-way previously graded for the Dothan, Hartford and Florida Railroad. (Note: The Dothan, Hartford and Florida Railroad was proposed in 1901 to run from Dothan, Alabama to St. Joseph, Florida, a distance of approximately 102 miles (164 km).) Approximately 15.75 miles (25.35 km) of track from Chipley to Macon, Florida were completed by 1908. The railroad was placed in receivership that year, and was still under receivership in 1927. Another 3.25 miles (5.23 km) of track were laid in late 1911 and early 1912, extending from Macon to Tiller, Florida, (Note: Tiller is currently used as a name for a swamp, a cemetery, and a pond, all near Greenhead, Florida, which later sources name as the location of the connection between the Birmingham, Columbus and Florida Railroad and the track owned by the Sales-Davis Company.) where a connection was made to a track owned by the Sales-Davis Company, a lumber company. The Birmingham, Columbus and Florida railroad leased trackage rights over the almost 19 miles (31 km) of the Sales-Davis Company railroad extending from Tiller to Southport. The only connection to another railroad was to the Louisville and Nashville at Chipley. Freight traffic on the railroad consisted primarily of lumber from the Sales-Davis mill in Southport.

The assets of the Birmingham, Columbus and St. Andrews Railroad were sold in 1926 and incorporated in the Alabama and Western Florida Railroad. Passenger and freight traffic declined in the 1930s. The railroad was placed under receivership in 1936. Passenger carriage was stopped in 1938. The railroad ceased operations in 1939.
