= Orlando Street Railway =

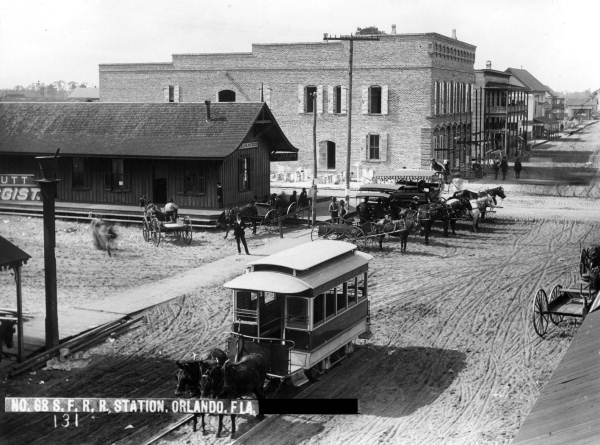
- A mule-drawn car of the Orlando Street Railway on Church Street.

Overview
- Headquarters: Orlando, FL
- Locale: Orlando, FL
- Dates of operation: c. February 1887–c. 1893

The Orlando Street Railway operated a mule-drawn streetcar line in downtown Orlando, Florida in the 1880s and 1890s. The main line ran north–south along Orange Avenue between Lake Lucerne and Lake Ivanhoe, with several east–west branches.

== History ==
A franchise was given by the city in late 1886 to S. V. Harkness and his new company, the Orlando Street Railway, to place tracks and run cars on certain streets. Cars were running over the line by February 1887. When completed, its main line ran along Orange Avenue from Lake Ivanhoe, near the north city limits at the time, south to Lake Lucerne. It ran around the west side of Lake Lucerne, and made several turns west and south to the South Florida Fair Association's property. One branch ran from the Church Street Station of the South Florida Railroad east on Church Street across Orange Avenue to Magnolia Avenue (then Main Street), then south on Main Street to a Methodist Episcopal church, and another branch ran east on Central Avenue from Orange Avenue.

Service was ended by early 1893, and a citrus freeze in 1894 and 1895 devastated Orlando's economy and ensured that the company would not resume operations. The tracks were removed in late 1896 or 1897, being considered a public nuisance. Many plans were made, including an extension of the Sanford Traction Company from Sanford, but no other street railways have entered downtown Orlando since.
