= Live Oak, Perry and South Georgia Railway =

Former Class III railroad in the U.S

Live Oak, Perry & South Georgia Railway (reporting mark LOPSG) was a 123-mile-long Class III railroad that operated freight service in the U.S. between Florida and Georgia from its 1971 creation, which was the result of a merger, until it was merged into the Norfolk Southern Railway (NS) in 1994. The line formerly owned three General Electric 70-ton switchers, LOP&G owning #300 and #301 while the South Georgia owned 202, which was later renumbered to #292 when the Southern acquired the Central of Georgia RR due to a numbering conflict. LOP&G #301 was sold in 1956 while the other two 70-ton switchers were retired in 1969. The LOP&G also owned two EMD GP9s that were built as part of the Southern's order for the same, with these units becoming #302 and #303, but they were later renumbered when the CofG was acquired to #298 and #299, and renumbered again when Southern consolidated their early Geep fleet, being renumbered SOU #6250 and #6251 in the early-1970s. Both of these units were retired in 1983. Operations over the lines were managed by the Southern Railway (SOU) and later by successor NS.

== History ==
The Live Oak, Perry & South Georgia (LOP&SG), which ran from Live Oak, Florida to Springdale, Florida and Adel, Georgia, was created on December 31, 1971, after the merger of the Live Oak, Perry & Gulf Railroad (LOP&G) and South Georgia Railway. Beginning with its creation in 1971, the railroad had freight service operated entirely by the Southern Railway, which had owned a majority of LOP&SG stock.

The LOP&G, which ran from Live Oak to Springdale, Florida, had been incorporated in October 1903 as the Live Oak & Perry Railroad and later was reorganized on June 16, 1905, as LOP&G

The South Georgia Railway, which ran from Springdale, Florida to Adel, Georgia, was incorporated on March 6, 1896, and opened in October 1901.

On December 31, 1990, LOP&SG's parent SOU was renamed Norfolk Southern Railway (NS). On February 5, 1994, LOP&SG and South Georgia were merged into NS.

On December 15, 1995, NS sold the 80-mile section between Foley, Florida and Adel, Georgia to Gulf & Ohio Railways, which created new subsidiary, Live Oak, Perry & Georgia Railroad, to own the trackage. The Gulf & Ohio's affiliated Georgia & Florida Railroad provided locomotives for service. The line today is in operation as the Georgia & Florida Railway.
