= Ocala, Silver Springs and Park Street Railroad =

The Ocala, Silver Springs and Park Street Railroad Company was incorporated by Florida state law chapter 3805 which was approved June 7, 1887. It was incorporated "to construct or operate a line of railway or railroad from the city of Ocala, in Marion county, to Silver Springs, in said county, and from Silver Springs to Silver Springs Park, in the said county, and through the streets of Silver Springs and Silver Springs Park under such restrictions as may be made by law, and said company shall have the right to operate said lines of road with steam or horse-power, as may be most convenient".

It was owned by C. M. Brown, John F. Dunn, Frederick R. Freeman, Daniel A. Miller, F. Brigham Bishop, Hugh E. Miller, George H. McMaster and Edwin Spencer.

== See also ==
- List of Florida street railroads
