= St. Johns River Terminal Company =

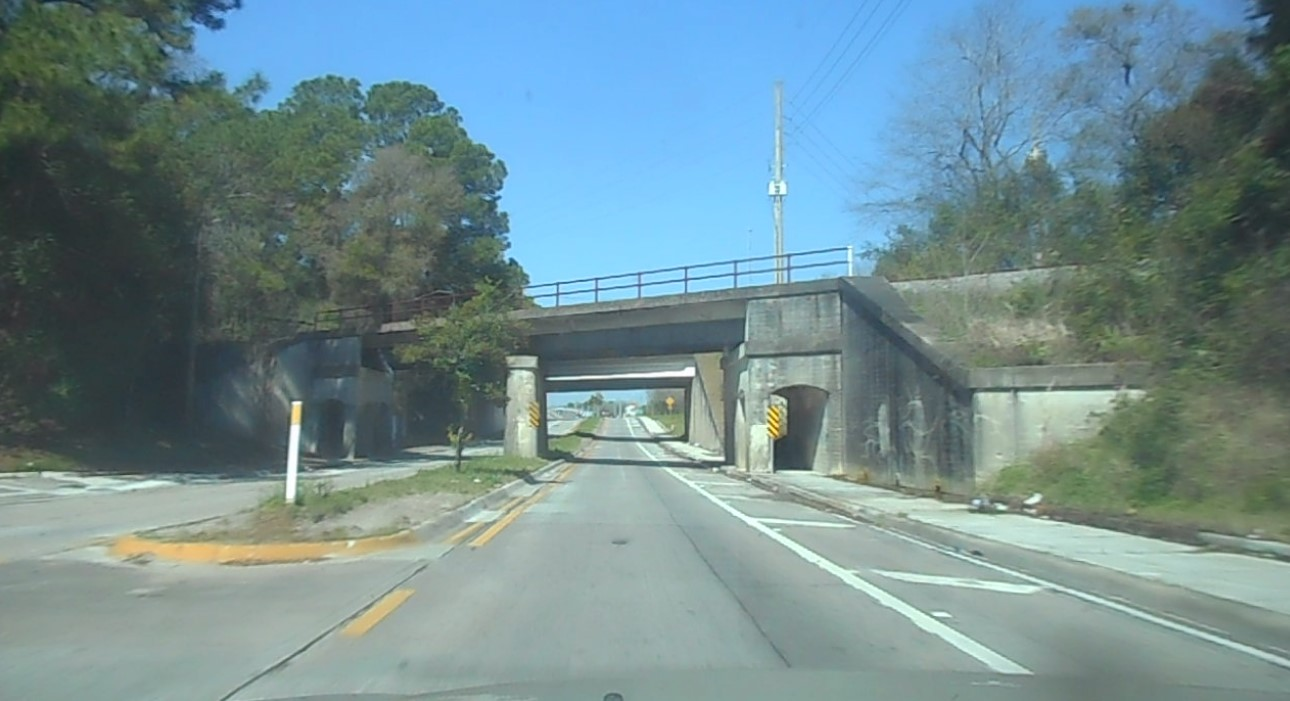
Bridge for the main line of the St. Johns River Terminal Railroad over US 23 in Grand Park, Jacksonville.

The St. Johns River Terminal Company (reporting mark SJRT) was part of the Southern Railway's line in Jacksonville, Florida, USA.

== History ==
The Atlantic, Valdosta and Western Railway owned a railway line from a station just east of downtown Jacksonville, at Bay Street and Catherine Street, north and west to Valdosta, Georgia. It was bought by the Georgia Southern and Florida Railway on October 16, 1902.

The St. Johns River Terminal had been incorporated on July 18, 1901, and took over the AV&W east of Grand Crossing, where the line to downtown splits from the line to the docks east of downtown. The rest of the AV&W became part of the GS&F, which had trackage rights over the SJRT. Stock was owned by the Southern Railway, which later bought the GS&F.

The SJRT owned two lines, splitting at a point northeast of downtown. One went east to Talleyrand Terminal; the other went south to the waterfront east of downtown. The whole line is now owned by Norfolk Southern.
