= Live Oak and Gulf Railway =

Railway in Florida

Live Oak & Gulf Railway
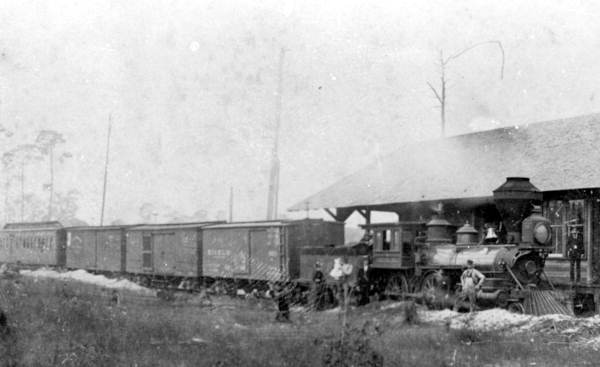
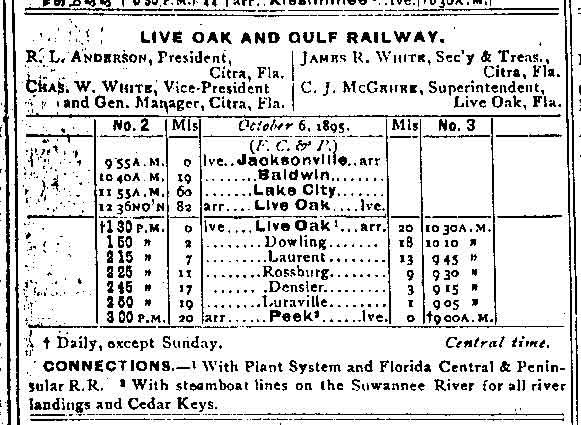
- Live Oak & Gulf Railway in Luraville around 1896 (Note: The Danforth-Cooke steam locomotive No. 98 was leased by the locomotive builder W.E. Boone from Jacksonville. The first freight car type No. 600 came from the Nashville, Chattanooga and St. Louis Railway. The second freight car had different doors: a solid door and a lattice door. The Jim Crow passenger and freight car was coupled to the rear.) Time table of October 6, 1895

Technical
- Line length: 20 miles (32 km)
- Track gauge: 4 ft 8 1/2 in (1,435 mm) standard gauge

The Live Oak & Gulf Railway was a standard gauge railway in Florida which was privately owned and operated from 1895 to 1916.

== History ==
=== Foundation ===
Charles White and James White from New York City, who managed French real estate in Citra, founded the Live Oak & Gulf Railway Company together with Robert L. Anderson from Ocala on January 4, 1895 with a share capital of $5,000. Anderson was President, Charles White was Vice President and James White was Secretary and Treasurer. They took over the track and assets of Live Oak, Luraville & Deadman's Bay Railroad (LOL&DBRR), but not their charter.

Robert Anderson had initially 5 shares, Charles White 10 and James White 35, but on March 5, 1895 the capital was increased to $150,000, although at that time only $5,000 had been used. W.C. Remick and Thomas McIntosh of LOL&DBRR were also brought on board and held 5 shares each, which they took over from Charles and James White. A mortgage account was opened with New York Security and Trust Co. in New York City.

=== Construction ===
Construction began at high speed in February 1895, so that a mile (1.6 km) of track had already been laid on March 1, 1895. James R. Morehead supervised the construction as a so-called roadmaster. On May 15, 1895, the entire 12 miles long line from Dowling's Log Railroad terminus to the Suwannee River at Peek, 2 miles west of Luraville, was completed. Bonds worth $100,000 were issued by the mortgage bank.

=== Operation ===
Operation started on 1 May 1895 with Charles McGehee from Live Oak as General Manager. The Live Oak & Gulf Railway had two locomotives. The engine shed was located on the premises of the mill in Live Oak. The company also owned a passenger car and a matching luggage car. Two flat cars rounded off the fleet. The first year of operation went very well: more than 9,000 tons of phosphate were transported with a turnover of $11,388. The Company earned $1,854 for the transportation of general cargo and $1,036 for the transportation of passengers. Expenses amounted to only $6,080, resulting in a positive result.

=== Decline and closure ===
1897 was a bad year and a turning point for the Live Oak & Gulf Railway, as phosphate production was discontinued at the end of 1896, after it had been determined that the iron content was too high. In 1897, no phosphate was shipped at all, and the railway had to shift its focus from transporting ore to transporting goods in general. Live Oak & Gulf was merged with Suwannee & San Pedro Railroad (S&SP) on June 30, 1905 to form Florida Railway. The Florida Railway operated the line to Luraville and the original 9 miles (14.5 km) of the former LO&G for the next eleven years until the line was closed in 1916 and the rails were lifted.
