= Benson Junction, Florida =

Benson Junction
- Unincorporated community
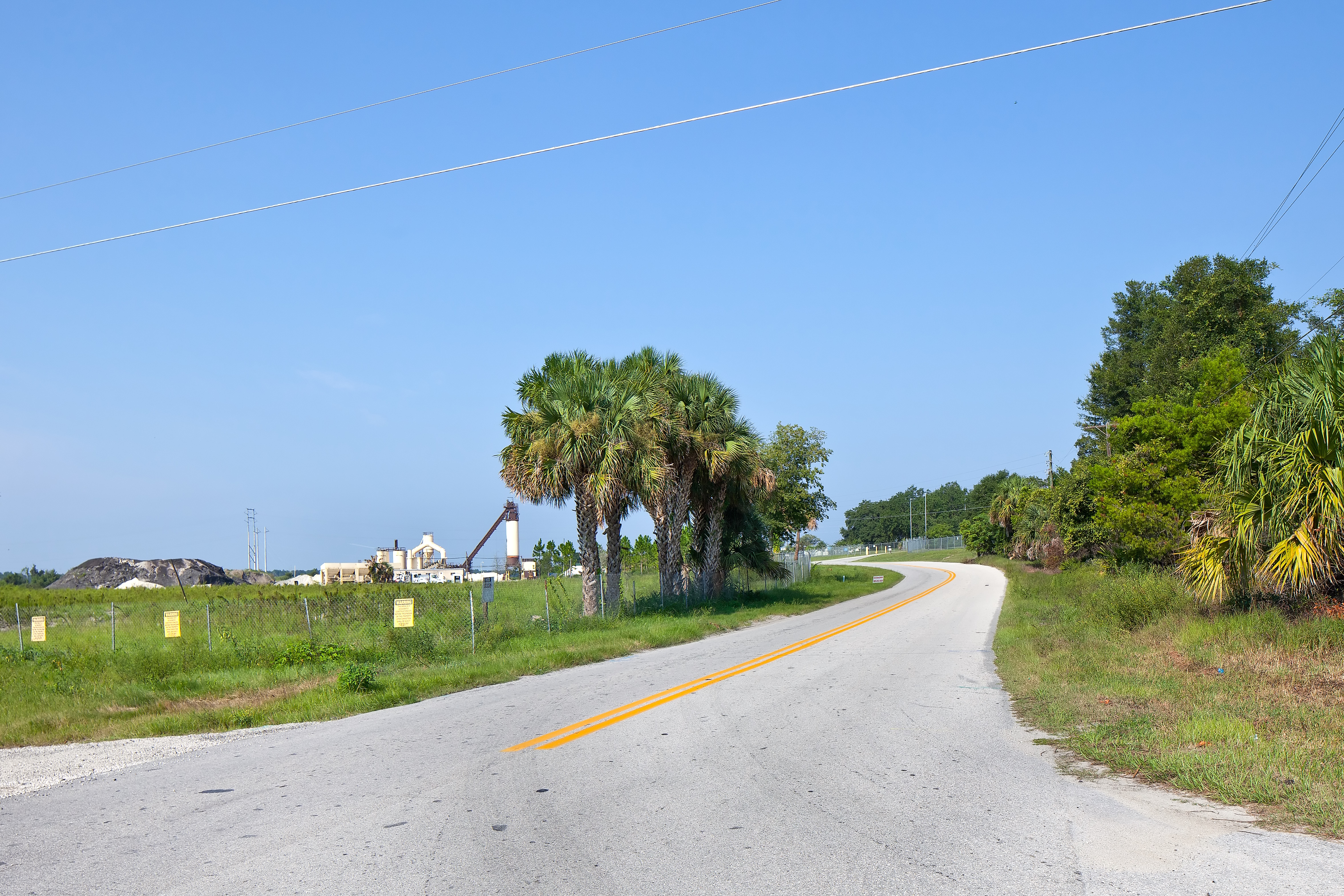
- Benson Junction viewed from the intersection of Benson Junction Road and Shell Road

- Location within Volusia County
- Coordinates: 28°51′55″N 081°19′46″W
- Country: United States
- State: Florida
- County: Volusia
- Elevation: 26 ft (8 m)
- Time zone: UTC-5 (Eastern (EST))
  - Summer (DST): UTC-4 (EDT)
- enter ZIP code: 32713
- Area code: 386
- GNIS feature ID: 295127

Benson Junction is located in southwest Volusia County, Florida, within the city limits of DeBary. It is the former location of the Ox Fibre Brush Company and presently an industrial location. Benson Junction is located just west of U.S. Highway 17-92 (Charles Richard Beall Blvd.), along Benson Junction Road.

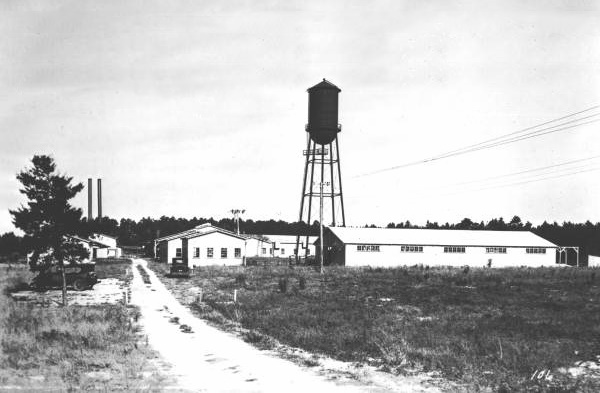
Ox Fibre Brush Company in 1930

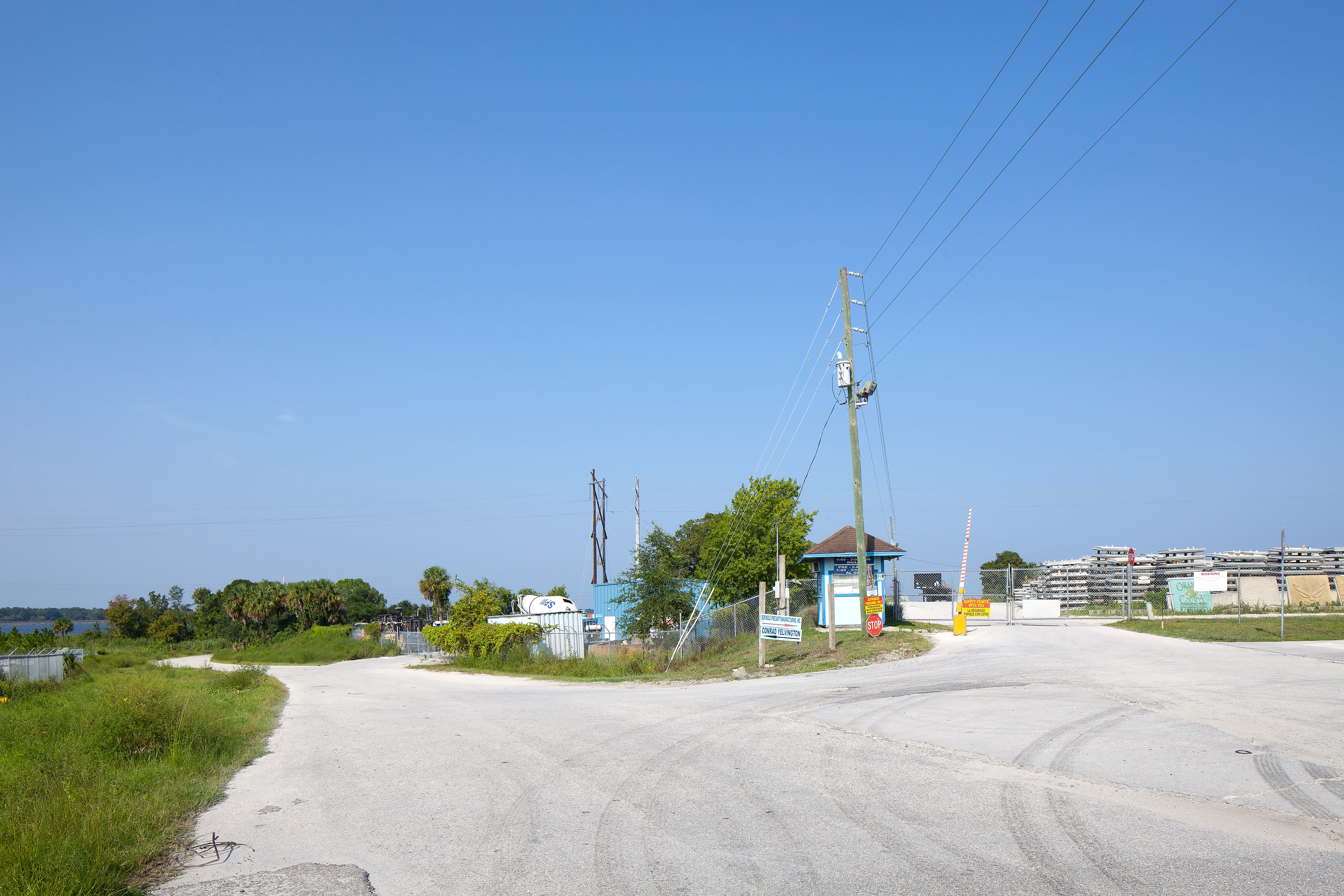
Former location of Ox Fibre Brush Company

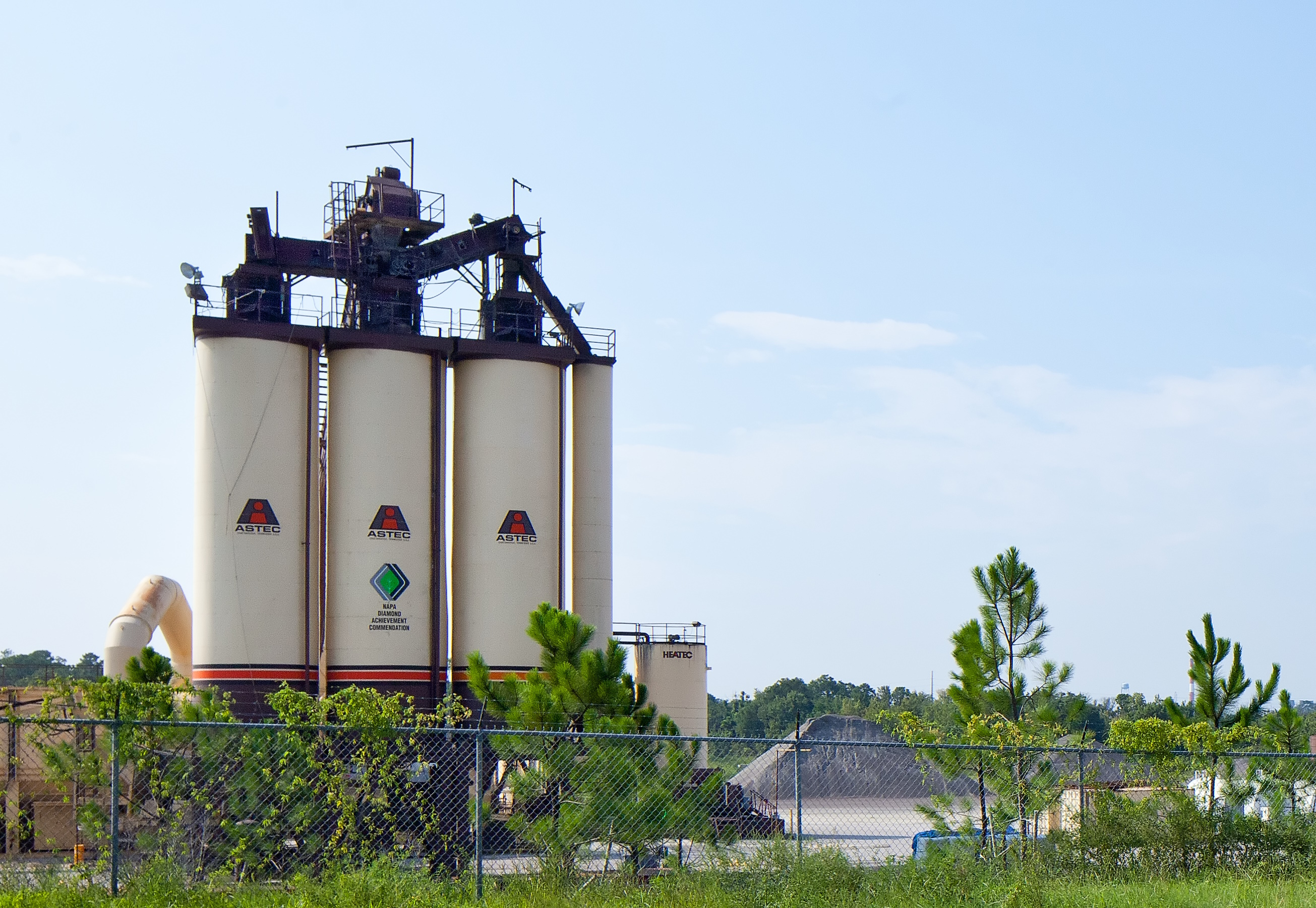
Astec asphalt plant at Benson Junction

== History ==
In 1885, Benson Junction was known as Enterprise Junction. By 1918, it became known as Benson Junction. The area consisted primarily of a railroad junction of the Indian River Division, owned by Luther Caldwell and Elijah Watson. The Enterprise Branch consisted of a 3.9 mile stretch of railroad between Enterprise and Enterprise Junction. The railroad continued to Titusville. Through consolidation, the railroad became part of the Jacksonville, Tampa and Key West Railway. In 1970, the tracks were removed.

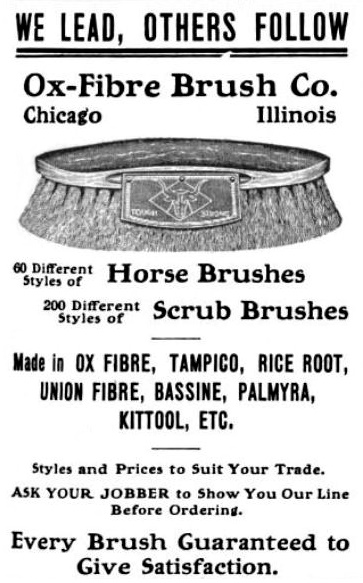
1905 Advertisement from the Ox Fibre Brush Company

The Ox Fibre Brush Company was founded in Sanford in 1884 by John K. Robinson. Brushes were made from the fibers of the native cabbage (sabal) palms, which are both strong and flexible. The palms were harvested from a 500–600-acre plot of land owned by the company in what is now the Orlandia Heights subdivision. A few years later, the plant was moved to Jacksonville, Florida. On May 3, 1901, a fire in the plant destroyed the plant as well as a significant portion of Jacksonville. The plant was rebuilt in Sanford, Florida, and in 1925, it was moved to a 40-acre site at Benson Junction, where brooms and brushes were produced until the plant closed in the 1970s.

During the prominence of the Ox Fibre Brush Company at Benson Junction, the area also had a post office and a grocery store.

Benson Junction was included in the boundaries of DeBary, when DeBary incorporated as a city in 1993.
