= Orange Ridge, DeLand and Atlantic Railroad =

19th century railroad in Florida

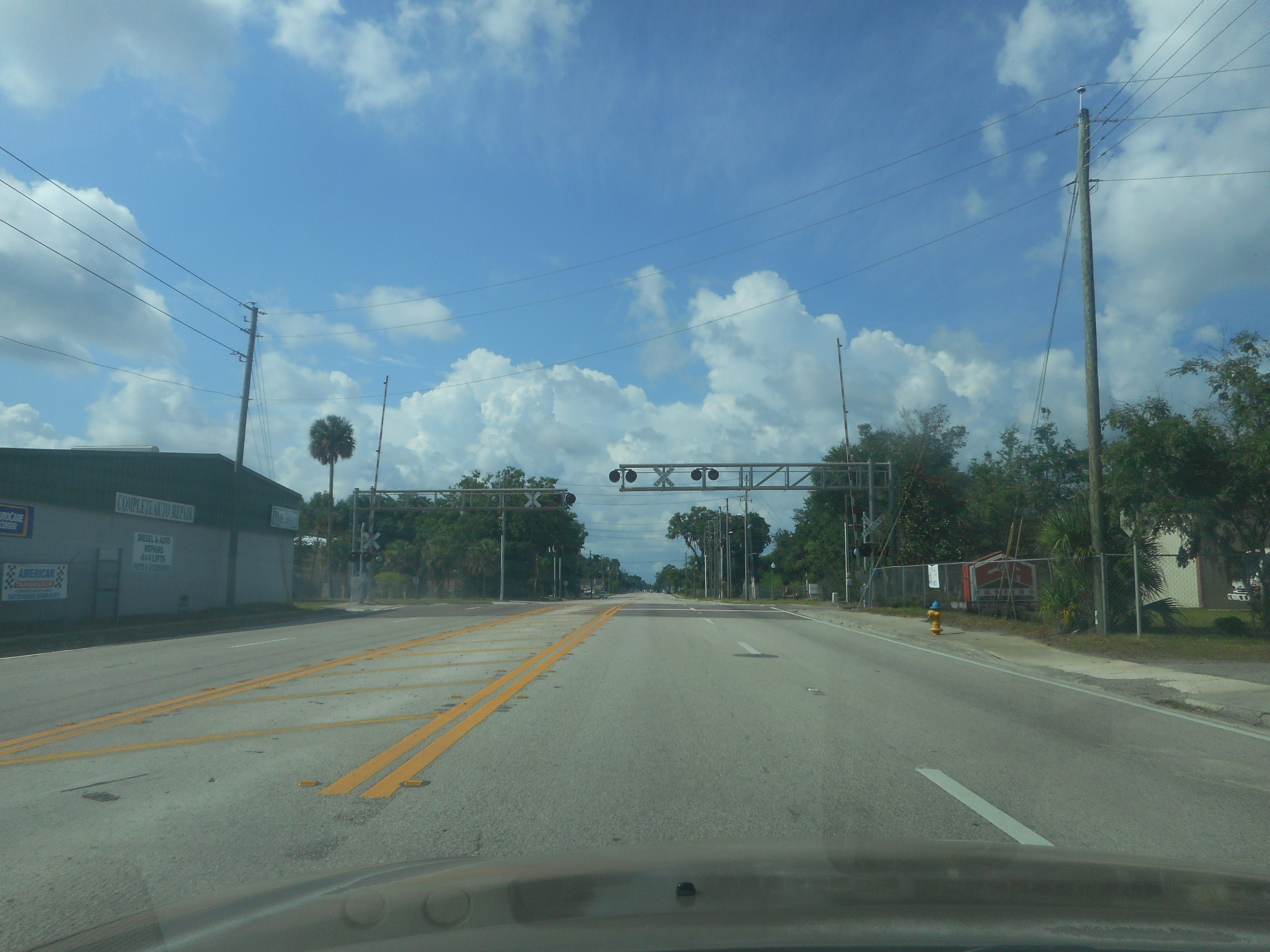
Southbound Florida State Road 15A approaching the DeLand Spur, built by the Orange Ridge, DeLand and Atlantic Railroad.

The Orange Ridge, DeLand and Atlantic Railroad was a railroad in Central Florida, United States, linking DeLand with the main line of the Jacksonville, Tampa and Key West Railway (now the CSX Sanford Subdivision). It connected with the Jacksonville, Tampa and Key West main line 2 miles (3.2 km) from DeLand Landing at DeLand Junction. The line is still operated by CSX as their DeLand Spur.

== History ==
Florida state law chapter 3332, approved 1880, incorporated the Orange Ridge, DeLand and Atlantic Railroad Company.

Florida state law chapter 3646, approved February 16, 1885, extended the time limit for completion to January 1, 1888.

The railroad was reincorporated in 1886 as the Deland and St. Johns River Railroad Company and converted to 5-foot gauge to match the Jacksonville, Tampa and Key West Railway.

The Jacksonville, Tampa and Key West Railway acquired the line in 1890, which became part of the Plant System in 1899. The Plant System became part of the Atlantic Coast Line Railroad in 1902. The Atlantic Coast Line Railroad merged with the Seaboard Air Line Railroad in 1967 to form the Seaboard Coast Line Railroad, and eventually became part of CSX Transportation in the 1980s.

== Historic stations ==
Milepost	City/Location	Station	Connections and notes
ASE 750.0	West DeLand	Deland Junction	junction with Jacksonville, Tampa and Key West Railway Main Line (ACL)
ASE 753.2	DeLand	Deland	

== Gallery ==
Valuation map of the line by the ACL, p. 1

Valuation map of the line by the ACL, p. 2.

Valuation map of the line by the ACL, p. 3
