= Georgia and Florida Railway (2005) =

Georgia & Florida Railroad

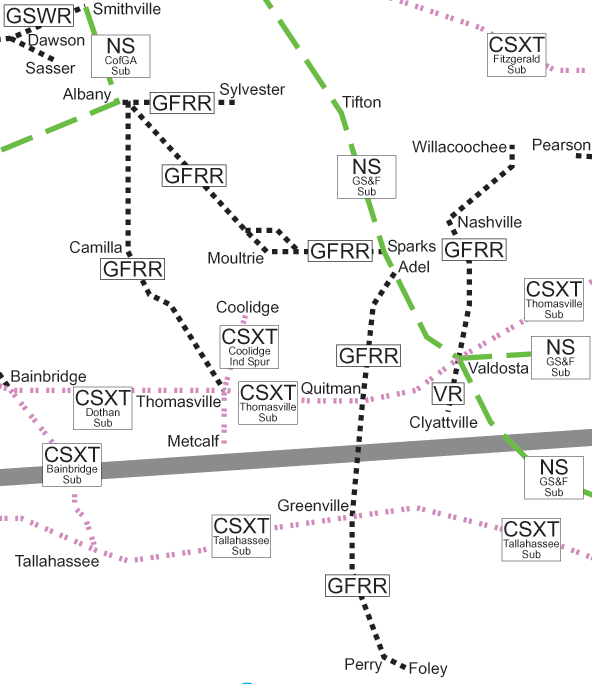
- GFRR system map, showing nearby railroads

Overview
- Headquarters: Albany, Georgia
- Reporting mark: GFRR
- Locale: Florida; Georgia
- Dates of operation: 1995–present
- Predecessor: CSX Transportation; Norfolk Southern Railway

Technical
- Track gauge: 4 ft 8 1/2 in (1,435 mm) standard gauge
- Length: 297 miles (478 kilometres)

Other
- Website: omnitrax.com/rail_gfrr.aspx (archived)

The Georgia and Florida Railway (reporting mark GFRR) is a short line railroad operating in Georgia and Florida, and is a subsidiary of OmniTRAX. The railroad spans 297 miles (478 km) over numerous different rail lines, most of which radiate out of Albany, Georgia.

Primary commodities include corn, scrap metal, chemicals, ethanol, cement, paper, cottonseed, clay wood pulp, peanuts, fertilizer, beer, aggregates and others, generating 21,000 annual carloads.

== History ==
Upon its start on April 14, 1995 the railroad was named the Georgia and Florida Railroad and was a Gulf & Ohio subsidiary operating over two lines: Albany to Sparks, and Valdosta to Nashville over former Norfolk Southern (NS) trackage.

Initially the railroad consisted of approximately 130 miles (210 km) of track over two separate branches, including trackage rights over NS to link the disconnected lines. The railroad initially hauled grain, peanuts, fertilizer, woodchips, and beer, totaling around 10,000 carloads.

=== Albany-Sparks ===
The Albany-Sparks route consists of two different routes meeting at Moultrie. The Albany-Moultrie portion was completed by the Georgia Northern Railway in 1905. In 1966, the Southern acquired the Georgia Northern and it was merged with the Albany & Northern Railway subsidiary.

The second section from (Moultrie-Sparks) was originally constructed by the Sparks Western Railway, however, the railroad was acquired by the Georgia & Florida Railway (G&F) in 1910, with the line being completed in 1911. The G&F became a subsidiary of the Southern in 1963. Both sections officially became part of NS in 1990 and were leased to G&F in 1995.

=== Valdosta-Nashville ===
The Valdosta-Nashville section was built by the Douglas, Augusta & Gulf Railway and became part of G&F around 1906. G&F later became part of the Southern in 1963 and NS in 1990.

In early 2005 changes came to the branch as the Georgia Department of Transportation purchased the line from G&F, including an additional section of exempted track from Nashville to Willacoochee, 16.6 miles (26.7 km), owned by the city of Willacoochee. Under the agreement, G&F would continue to operate the line from Valdosta to Willachoochee. CaterParrott Railnet now operates this line.

=== Live Oak, Perry & South Georgia ===
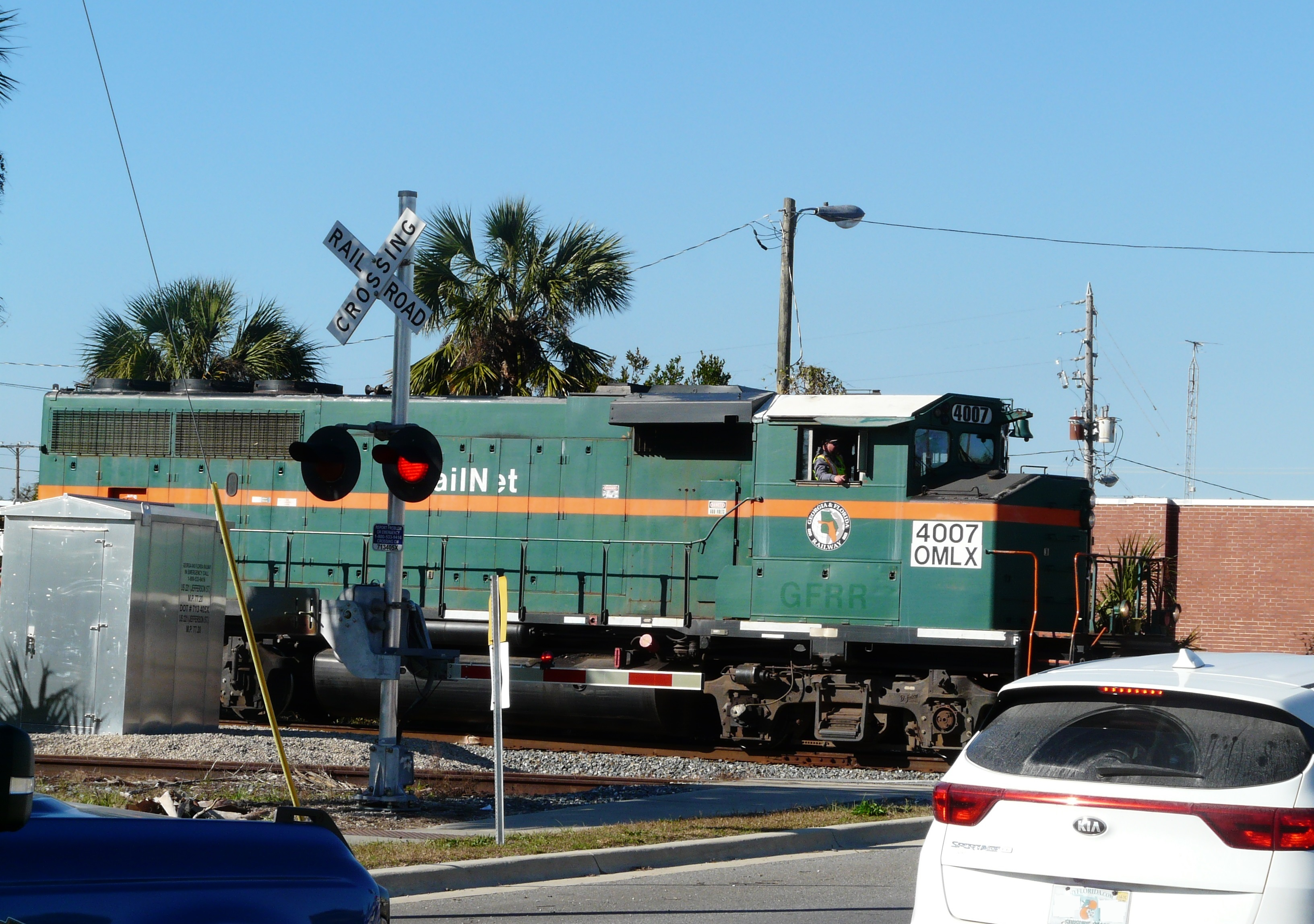
GFRR train in Perry, Florida

Starting around 1896 the South Georgia Railroad built a line south from a point near Adel to Quitman. The line was extended further to Greenville, Florida in 1901 where it met the South Georgia & West Coast Railway, which ran from Greenville to Perry, Florida. The entire line was later reorganized as the South Georgia Railway. In 1971 the Southern Railway acquired the line and merged it with a separate line, the Live Oak, Perry and Gulf, to form the Live Oak, Perry, and South Georgia.

On December 15, 1995 the LOP&SG was purchased as a subsidiary of Gulf & Ohio. The railroad ran from Adel, Georgia to Foley, Florida, 80 miles (130 km), and was operated by the Georgia & Florida.

=== Consolidation and Acquisition by RailNet ===
On January 21, 1999 Gulf & Ohio consolidated its holdings in the region under a single entity and sold the new network – including the two branches of the neighboring Atlantic & Gulf railroad – to RailNet. The new railroad was renamed Georgia and Florida RailNet.

=== OmniTRAX ===
OmniTRAX acquired the entire Georgia & Florida RailNet in 2005, renaming the railroad Georgia and Florida Railway.

A boon came to the railroad in 2006 as an ethanol plant was planned for Camilla, Georgia. The new facility was expected to generate significant traffic for the line when it opened in late 2008. However, due to financial difficulties experienced by the facility, it is unclear whether the effect on the G&F railroad will remain.

== See also ==
- Georgia and Florida Railroad (1926–1963)
