= Ocklawaha Valley Railroad =

Railroad in Florida, U.S.

Overview
- Locale: northeastern Florida
- Dates of operation: 1914–1922

Technical
- Track gauge: 4 ft 8 1/2 in (1,435 mm) standard gauge

The Ocklawaha Valley Railroad, originally the Ocala Northern Railroad, was a railroad running from Silver Springs Junction, Florida (east of Ocala, Florida) to Palatka, Florida, running roughly parallel to the Oklawaha River. Except for the southernmost part, from Silver Springs Junction to Silver Springs, which was leased from the Seaboard Air Line Railroad (with trackage rights on the SAL main line to Ocala), the railroad never had any corporate relationship with larger railroad companies.

== History ==
The Ocala Northern Railroad, a new railroad company, leased the 1.9-mile (3.1 km) Seaboard Air Line Railroad spur to Silver Springs on December 14, 1909, and obtained trackage rights over four miles (6 km) of the Seaboard Air Line Railroad to downtown Ocala. The ONRR was owned by E. P. Rentz, who owned a saw mill at Silver Springs. He soon built his railroad north to Fort McCoy and built a series of logging railroads into the forest. He continued to build the ONRR, and it reached Palatka, Florida by 1912, with 45.5 miles (73.2 km) of track stretching from Silver Springs to Palatka.

According to E.P. Rentz quoted in the Palatka Daily News there were dreams of a great diagonal railroad running from Jacksonville to Tampa via Ocala. Rentz may have had in mind an associations with the Ocala Southwestern Railroad, which ran about 6 miles southwest of Ocala in the direction of Tampa; no but nothing more ever came of it. Plans to extend the railroad across the St. Johns River to Hastings and then north on the east shore to Jacksonville fell through; the company went bankrupt in May 1913.

H. S. Cummings of Cummings Lumber built a large cypress sawmill in Rodman, Florida, a company town. Rodman, Florida, became a boom town and eventually reached a population of over 4,000 persons. The town even sported a central city park with an oriental garden and the mill provided high quality tool handles for industries across the United States.

The logging operation initially depended on the nearby St. Johns River at Horse Landing, to ship raw logs out of the Ocklawaha River Valley. The completion of the railroad to Rodman Junction spelled the end of hauling logs to market by wagon, soon Cummings Lumber was operating a large rail system reaching into the forest in every direction.

On April 16, 1915, the railroad was bought by H.S. Cummings of Rodman Lumber in Rodman, Florida, and reorganized as the Ocklawaha Valley Railroad. The lease of the SAL's Silver Springs Branch was transferred on August 19, 1915. A short 1.5-mile (2.4 km) branchline was built from Rodman Junction to Rodman. and many logging lines were built to connect to the OVRR. Passenger service was also provided.

H.S. Cummings no doubt knew of 'Billy' the railroad goat. Billy belonged to the daughter of the railroads chief engineer and the day after the family's arrival in Fort Mc Coy the goat escaped and reboarded the next train out. The railroad crew knew who the little critter belonged to and promptly returned him on another train, further investigation proved Billy performed the entire feat without human assistance, in fact, it became a habit. The legend quickly spread and H.S. Cummings snapped it up as a marketing tool. New settlers along the railroad were given their own baby 'Billy The Ocklawaha Valley Railroad Goat.' The truth may be stranger than fiction but Florida's first documented railroad enthusiast had 4 legs.

The mill closed in 1922, and Cummings had grown ill. The railroad was sold at a bankruptcy auction. Each major railroad wanted the line, but they were all afraid of a bidding war, so they agreed to allow an independent company to win the auction unopposed. Unfortunately for them, that independent company, Assets Realization of New York, had bought it for scrap value. Residents and companies along the line and connecting railroads protested, and brought the case all the way to the Supreme Court, which ordered that it would not be abandoned. However, Assets Realization disobeyed the court and tore it up anyway in December 1922, leaving the Florida Railroad Commission "no recourse but to declare the Ocklawaha Valley Railroad abandoned".

=== Today ===
Several station foundations remain, and large parts of right-of-way are visible on aerial photos and on the ground. Parts of the right-of-way were used for CR 315 from Orange Springs to Kenwood and SR 19 into Palatka.

== Connections ==
Connections were provided to every major railroad and one area shortline:

- Seaboard Air Line Railroad at Silver Springs Junction and Ocala (via leased trackage)
- Atlantic Coast Line Railroad at Palatka and Ocala (via leased trackage)
- Florida East Coast Railway at Palatka
- Southern Railway at Palatka
- Ocala and Southwestern Railroad at Ocala (via leased trackage)

== Stations ==
Milepost	City	Station	Notes
54	Ocala	Ocala	junction with Atlantic Coast Line Railroad
	Ocala	Silver Springs Junction	junction with Seaboard Air Line Railroad main line
48	Silver Springs	Silver Springs	Seaboard Air Line Railroad-owned track ends
		Oak Junction	
41		Burbank	
40		Daisy	
35	Fort McCoy	Fort McCoy	
27		Bay Lake	
23	Orange Springs	Orange Springs	
18		Kenwood	
		Kennilworth	
14	Cummings	Rodman Junction	branch to Rodman
6	Stokley	Silver Lake	
0	Palatka	Palatka	used the Southern Railway station at the St. Johns River via trackage rights connections to the Atlantic Coast Line Railroad main line and the Florida East Coast Railway main line (a route that would be bypassed by the Moultrie Cut-off to become the Palatka Branch in 1925).
