= Fernandina and Amelia Beach Railway =

The Fernandina and Amelia Beach Railway Company, owned by W. Naylor Thompson, Samuel A. Swann, D. E. Maxwell, William B. C. Duryee and Augustus O. MacDonell, officers of the Florida Transit Railroad, was incorporated by Florida state law chapter 3497, approved March 1, 1883, for the purpose of constructing a line of railway from the City of Fernandina Beach to Amelia City on Amelia Beach. The two-mile line was built in 1886 and operated by the Florida Railway & Navigation Company (successor to the Florida Transit Railroad). In 1900 the line was sold and converted to an electric streetcar line.

== See also ==
- List of Florida street railroads
