= Florida, Georgia and Western Railway =

The Florida, Georgia and Western Railway Company was incorporated as a result of Florida State Law Chapter 4098, approved May 7, 1891.

The company was owned by Christopher W. McLean and George S. Daniels of Toledo, Ohio, William C. Lewis of Tallahassee, Henry F, Dutton of Gainesville, and James M. Mayo of Ocala.
