= Withlacoochee Railway =

The Withlacoochee Railway Company was incorporated under Florida state law chapter 4256, approved May 24, 1893, for the purpose of surveying, operating and maintaining a railroad from some point in or near the town of Madison, Madison County, Florida, upon the most practical route in a northerly direction to the line between the states of Florida and Georgia.

== Owners ==
The company was owned by J. M. Wilkinson, E. L. Moore and Maxey Ashley.

In 1895, the railway was consolidated into the Valdosta Railway.

== See also ==
- List of defunct Florida railroads
