= NASA X =

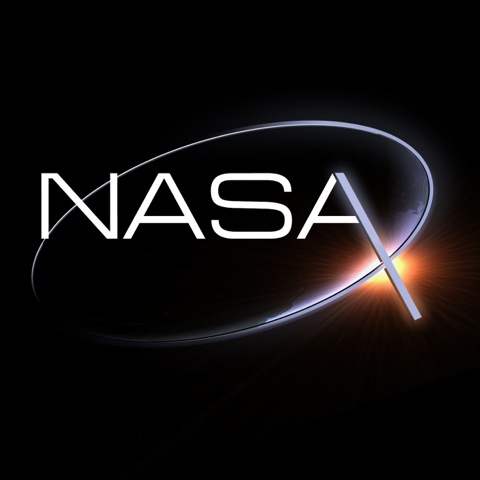
- Genre: Educational; Documentary
- Country of origin: United States
- Original language: English
- No. of seasons: 9
- No. of episodes: 23

NASA X is a half-hour television program and vodcast developed by co-producers Michael Bibbo and Kevin Krigsvold in partnership with the NASA Langley Research Center. The program premiered in August 2012. It currently airs on DIRECTV, cable, iTunes, Hulu, NASA Television, and is available on certain aircraft as in-flight entertainment. The program is consistently one of the top downloaded programs on NASA.gov. It is currently starting its 7th season.

== Description ==
NASA X is a 30-minute television program and vodcast produced by AMA Studios and NASA Langley Research Center in Hampton, Virginia.

Created around NASA technologies, NASA X introduces viewers to cutting-edge science, technology, engineering, planetary exploration, aeronautics and space exploration. NASA X is produced and written by Kevin Krigsvold and Michael Bibbo. NASA X is edited, directed and photographed by Michael Bibbo.

NASA X is a documentary based program produced on-location at NASA centers across the country, as well as at other relevant sites around the globe. It is currently hosted by Jennifer Pulley. Vince Whitfield hosted the pilot program in 2012. Jennifer is linked to NASA with 4 Emmy award-winning programs including NASA CONNECT, NASA's Destination Tomorrow, NASA 360 and NASA X.

== Awards and achievements ==
Producers Krigsvold and Bibbo were the original creators of NASA's Destination Tomorrow (2000-2007) and NASA 360 (2007-2012). On June 6, 2007, NASA 360 won the Emmy for non-news program editing from the National Capital Chesapeake Bay Chapter of the National Academy of Television Arts and Sciences, which includes 29 media outlets in Washington D.C., Virginia and Maryland. NASA 360 has won numerous other awards, including (4) Communicator Awards for overall program and editing, (2) Omni Awards for overall program and editing, (2) Davey Awards for overall program and editing, (2) Marcom Awards,(2) Ava Awards, (2) Videographer Awards, (4) additional Telly awards (including the 30th Anniversary Telly for Overall Program and Editing), and (2) EMPIXX awards. In 2010, Michael Bibbo and 2nd camera operator, Tom Shortridge won the 2nd place award for NASA Videographer of the Year in the production category.

In June 2011, former Director/Editor Michael Bibbo was nominated in the single camera editing category for the National Daytime Emmy Awards. In June 2012, NASA X won the Emmy for best promotional spot for a new series (NASA X) from the National Capital Chesapeake Bay Chapter of the National Academy of Television Arts and Sciences. In June 2014 NASA X won a second regional Emmy award for the program "Power and Propulsion" in the category of Informational/Instructional/Program/Special. Producer Michael Bibbo also won NASA's 2013 Videographer of the Year. NASA 360 and NASA X has partnered with several in-flight entertainment companies to air programs on airlines and cruise lines around the globe.
