= Irwin County High School =

Public high school in Ocilla, Georgia, United States

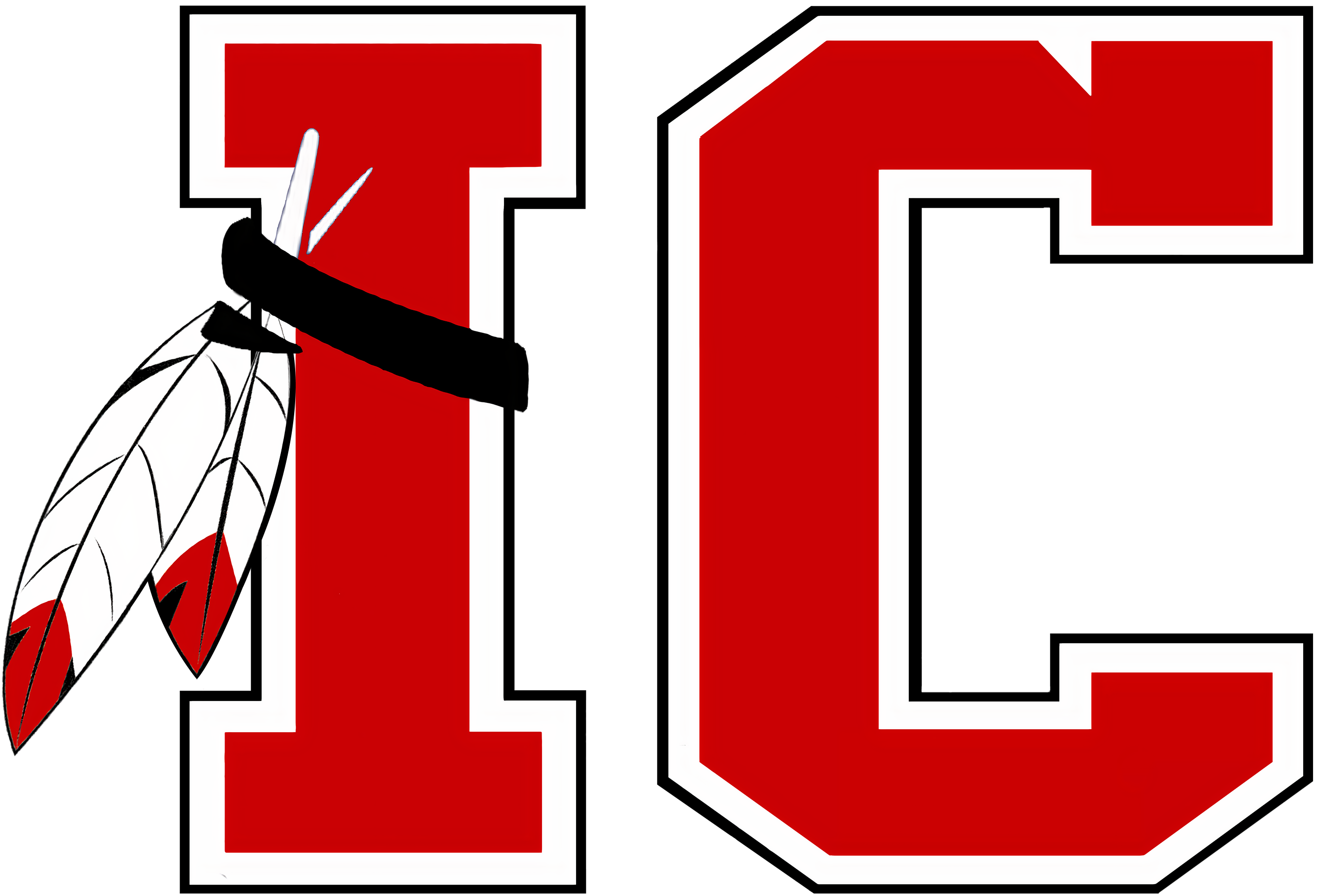

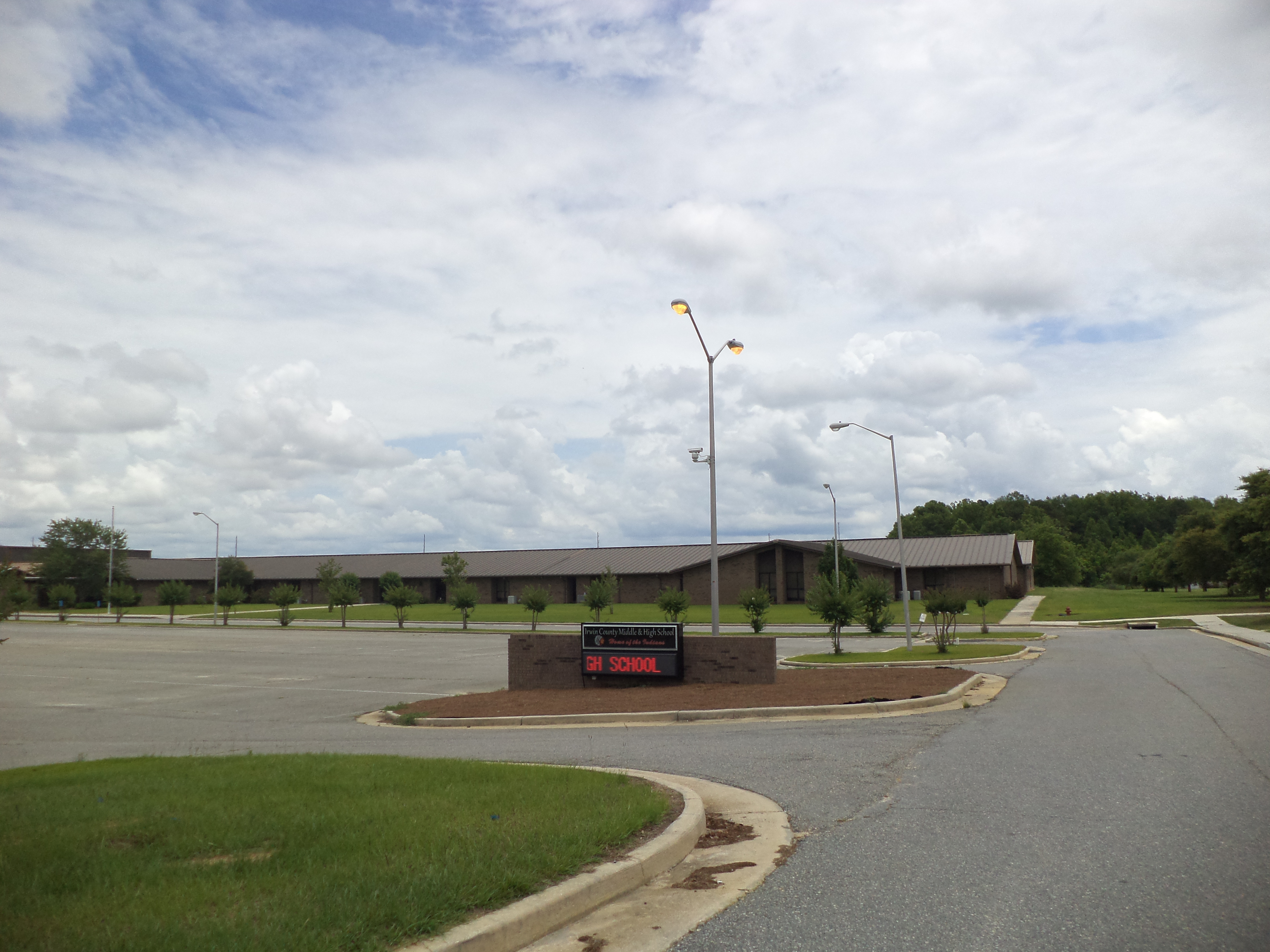
- Irwin County High School in 2013

Location
- 149 Chieftain Circle; Ocilla, Georgia; United States; 31.5777°N 83.2392°W

Information
- Type: Public
- School district: Irwin County School District
- CEEB code: 112305
- Principal: Jared Luke
- Teaching staff: 37.90 (FTE)
- Grades: 9 to 12
- Gender: Coeducational
- Enrollment: 502 (2023–2024)
- Student to teacher ratio: 13.25
- Campus: Rural
- Colors: Red, black, and white
- Mascot: Indian
- Team name: Indians
- Rivals: Purple Hurricanes
- Accreditation: Southern Association for Secondary Schools and Colleges and Georgia Department of Education
- Newspaper: Arrowhead
- Website: irwincountyhigh.org

Irwin County High School is a public high school in Ocilla, Georgia, United States serving grades 9 through 12. Around 450 students attended Irwin County High School as of the 2011-2012 school year.

Irwin County High School is governed by the Irwin County School District and is accredited by the Southern Association for Secondary Schools and Colleges, as well as the Georgia DOE.

The Irwin County High School marching band attended and played at the 2011 Sugar Bowl in New Orleans.

== Demographics ==
In the 2011-2012 school year, 433 students attended Irwin County High School. 49% were male and 51% were female. 65% of students at ICHS were white/Caucasian, 31% were African-American, 0.02% were Asian, 0% were Hawaiian/Pacific Islander, 3% were Hispanic, and 1% were two or more races. 35% of students were considered to be a part of a minority. 66% of students were considered economically disadvantaged, with 54% receiving free lunches and 12% receiving reduced lunches. For the 2011-2012 school year, there were 136 ninth-grade students, 101 tenth-grade students, 109 eleventh-grade students, and 87 twelfth-grade students.

== Campus and building ==
Irwin County High School's present-day campus shares a location and building with Irwin County Middle School and the alternative education school, and opened for the 1995-96 school year. It was designed and constructed by Smith & Smith Architects. The main building consists of seven main hallways containing the library, cafeteria, gym, chorus and band rooms, and multiple technology labs.

Around 2000, due to an increase in the student body, a need for additional classrooms was identified. Six classrooms, two and two bathrooms were added. The library's size was increased by about fifty percent.

The campus has livestock holding and showing facilities, a 570-seat auditorium, greenhouses, tool shops, and a football stadium with a field house and track facilities.

== Curriculum ==
Irwin County High School follows the national CORE curriculum set of standards. It also offers business education, Spanish, library sciences, journalism, and show choir courses.

== Extracurricular activities ==
Irwin County High School offers a variety of school clubs and student organizations. Clubs include the school newspaper, Technology Student Association, Future Business Leaders of America, FCCLA, Future Educators of America, Future Farmers of America, One Club, and Spanish Club.

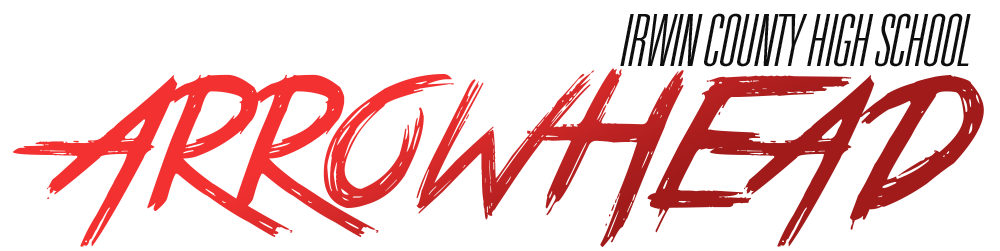
The logo for the school newspaper

== Notable alumni ==
- Justin Anderson - offensive lineman for the Indianapolis Colts
- Dre Barnes - running back for Liberty University
- Dennis Dove - pitcher for the St. Louis Cardinals
- Bruce Dorminey - Forbes journalist
- Jack Smith - football player
- Walt H. Sumner - outfielder and defensive back for Florida State University
- Shane Marshall- Running Back at Georgia Tech
- DJ Lundy- Linebacker who played at Florida State University
- Elijah Fears- Defensive Lineman at Georgia Southern University
