= Oscar H. Banker =

Armenian American inventor

- Born: Asatour Sarafian; Ասատուր Սարաֆեան; 1895; Ottoman Empire
- Died: January 1979 (aged 83); Cleveland, Ohio
- Occupation: Inventor
- Children: Oscar H. Banker Jr.

Oscar H. Banker (born Asatour Sarafian; May 31, 1895– January 1979) was an Armenian American inventor who patented a number of works, including an automatic transmission for automobiles, the needleless inoculation gun, the primary controls of the first Sikorsky helicopter, and power steering. He is considered by some as the "father of automatic transmission." He is accredited as the inventor of the first practical automatic transmission.

== Life and career ==
An Armenian by descent, Oscar Banker was born as Asadur Sarafyan in the Ottoman Empire in 1895.

Asadur left the Ottoman Empire as a teenager and settled in Chicago. After his arrival in Ellis Island and subsequent settlement, Asatour Sarafian took up the name Oscar Banker and began working for a shop that specialized in machinery. While working at the machine shop, Banker invented a saw-filing machine. After his first invention, Banker dedicated his life to inventing.

When General Motors incorporated the semi-automatic transmission system, the mechanism had many flaws. Oscar Banker proposed an automatic transmission system for the company that would be safer and more durable. After battling for eight years with automobile engineering companies, Banker's proposition was accepted and his automatic transmission was adopted by General Motors. Eventually, Banker came to be known as "the man who made [consumer advocate] Ralph Nader." He was also mentioned in Ralph Nader's book Unsafe at Any Speed.

Banker was also noted for his contribution to aviation mechanics. He invented the primary control of the first Sikorsky helicopter. The invention eventually led to the mass production of helicopters during World War II.

Banker invented a pneumatic inoculation gun. Banker's wife heard on the television that military surgeon Dr. Robert Hingson suggested such a mechanism, and she told her husband. Banker ultimately patented the gun in 1968. The gun was accepted by the Med-E-Jet company in Cleveland, Ohio. It had the ability to administer 2,000 shots an hour. The gun was used throughout the world. When Grenada suffered an epidemic, Med-E-Jet issued many of Banker's pneumatic inoculation guns. On August 2, 1979, Grenada issued a postage stamp to commemorate his achievement.

Bob Hull published Oscar H. Banker's memoirs titled Dreams and Wars of an American Inventor: An Immigrant's Romance in 1983. In his memoirs Banker writes: "America is yet the greatest country existing for opportunity, for achievement and if a person can endure the hardships, ridicule, rebuffs, whatever and keep on going! That is what counts. And absolutely nothing else."

Oscar Banker had a son named Oscar Banker Jr.

Oscar Banker died in Cleveland, Ohio in 1979 at the age of 83.

== Notable patents ==
- Band Saw Sharpener U.S. Patent Number 1,634,281, filing date: 3 March 1924, issue date: 5 July 1927.
- Change Speed Transmission U.S. Patent Number 1,985,884, filing date: 14 December 1932, issue date: 1 January 1935.
- Change Speed Transmission Mechanism U.S. Patent Number 2,198,072, filing date: 31 May 1934, issue date: 23 April 1940.
- Automatic Transmission U.S. Patent 2,199,095, filing date: 18 October 1934, issue date: 30 April 1940.
- Gun Type Inoculator U.S. Patent Number 3,518,990, filing date: 2 May 1968, issue date: 7 July 1970.
- Self-cleaning Apparatus for Purifying Sea Water by Distillation U.S. Patent Number 2,735,807, filing date: 20 October 1951, issue date: 21 February 1956.
- Change-Speed Gearing for Aircraft Propellers U.S. Patent Number 2,348,716, filing date: 15 May 1941, issue date: 16 May 1944.
- Power-steering Mechanism U.S. Patent Number 2,977,813, filing date: 13 April 1955, issue date: 4 April 1961.
- Relief Valve for High Pressures U.S. Patent Number 2,989,072, filing date: 24 April 1959, issue date: 20 June 1961.
- Automatic Light Switch and Battery Disconnect U.S. Patent Number 3,963,941, filing date: 16 April 1975, issue date: 15 June 1976.
- Inking Mechanism for Multicolor Printing Press U.S. Patent Number 2,022,840, filing date: 7 July 1927, issue date: 3 December 1935.
