= Hypospray =

Fictional medical device

- Star Trek franchise element
- First appearance: Star Trek: The Original Series
- Created by: Gene Roddenberry
- Genre: Science fiction

In-universe information
- Type: Medical tool
- Function: Used to inject medication into a patient's body
- Affiliation: Starfleet

A hypospray is a medical device in the science fiction television series Star Trek. It is similar to a jet injector, a real medical device, with the main difference being that the fictional medical device does not penetrate the skin.

The concept of the hypospray was developed when producers of the original Star Trek series discovered that NBC's broadcast standards and practices prohibited the use of hypodermic syringes to inject medications; the needleless hypospray sidestepped this issue. The prop used in the original series appeared to be a modified fuel injector for a large automotive diesel engine, similar to the engines from which jet injectors were derived.

== In the Star Trek universe ==
In the Star Trek universe, the hypospray was developed by the mid-22nd century, since it is featured in Star Trek: Enterprise. Many characters use it, including Dr. Crusher in Star Trek: The Next Generation, The Doctor in Star Trek: Voyager, and Dr. McCoy in Star Trek: The Original Series.

The device applies medication by spraying it onto the skin, and can be used directly or through clothing. The real-life jet injector is usually applied at the top of the arm, but the fictional hypospray is sometimes applied at the neck. It administers medication subcutaneously and intramuscularly.

The hypospray is extremely versatile, as the medicine vials can be quickly swapped out from the bottom of the hypospray. As the hypospray is bloodless, it is not contaminated by use. This allows it to be used on many patients until the hypospray is depleted.
