= Langley Research Center =

NASA research facility in Virginia

Coordinates: 37.0925°N 76.3825°W

NASA Langley Research Center

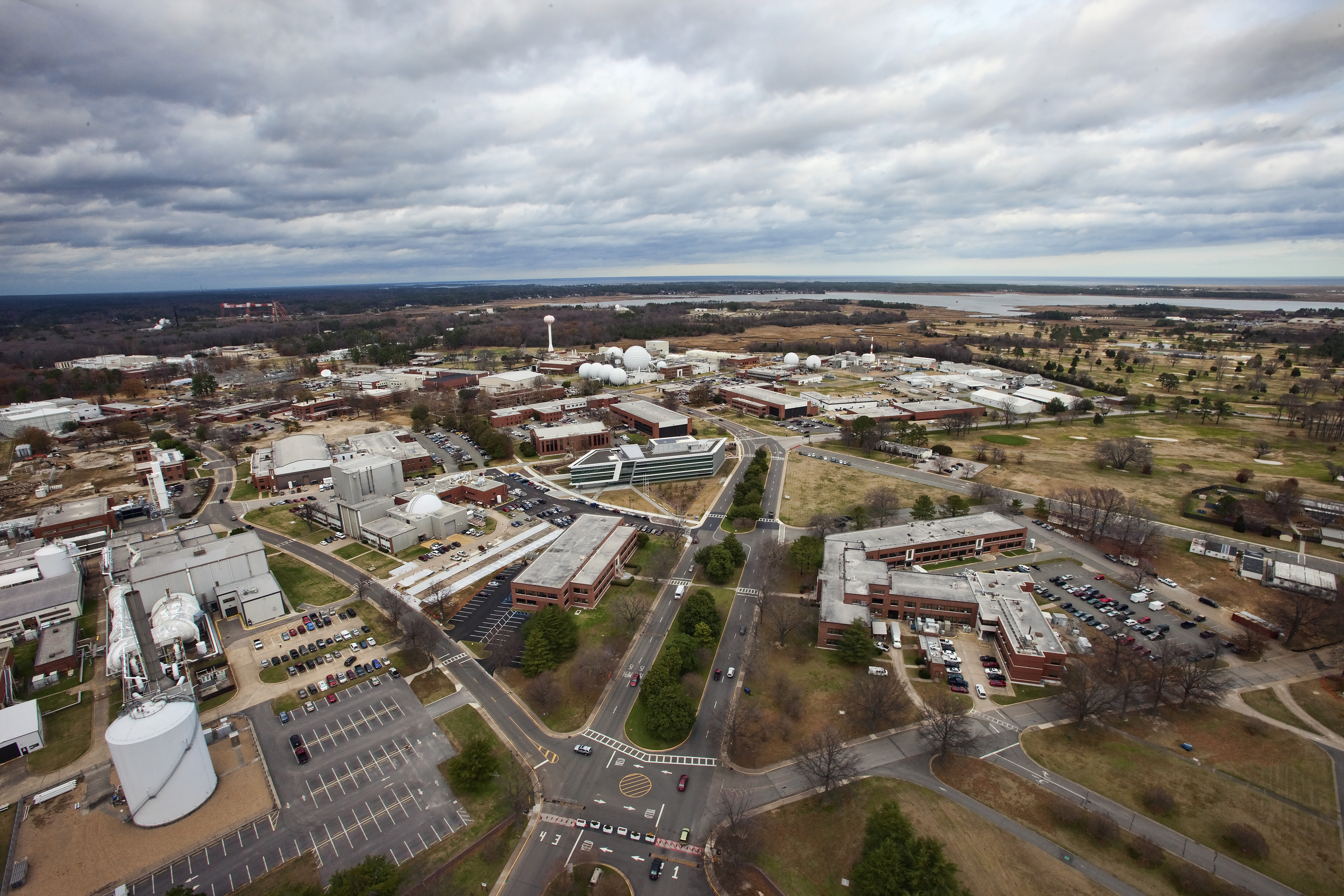
- Aerial view of the Langley Research Center in December 2011

Agency overview
- Formed: 1917
- Preceding agency: Langley Memorial Aeronautical Laboratory (NACA)
- Jurisdiction: U.S. federal government
- Headquarters: Hampton, Virginia, U.S.
- Employees: 1,821 (2017)
- Agency executives: Dr. Trina Marsh Dyal, Acting Center Director; W. Allen Kilgore, Acting Deputy Director
- Parent agency: NASA
- Website: nasa.gov/langley

Map
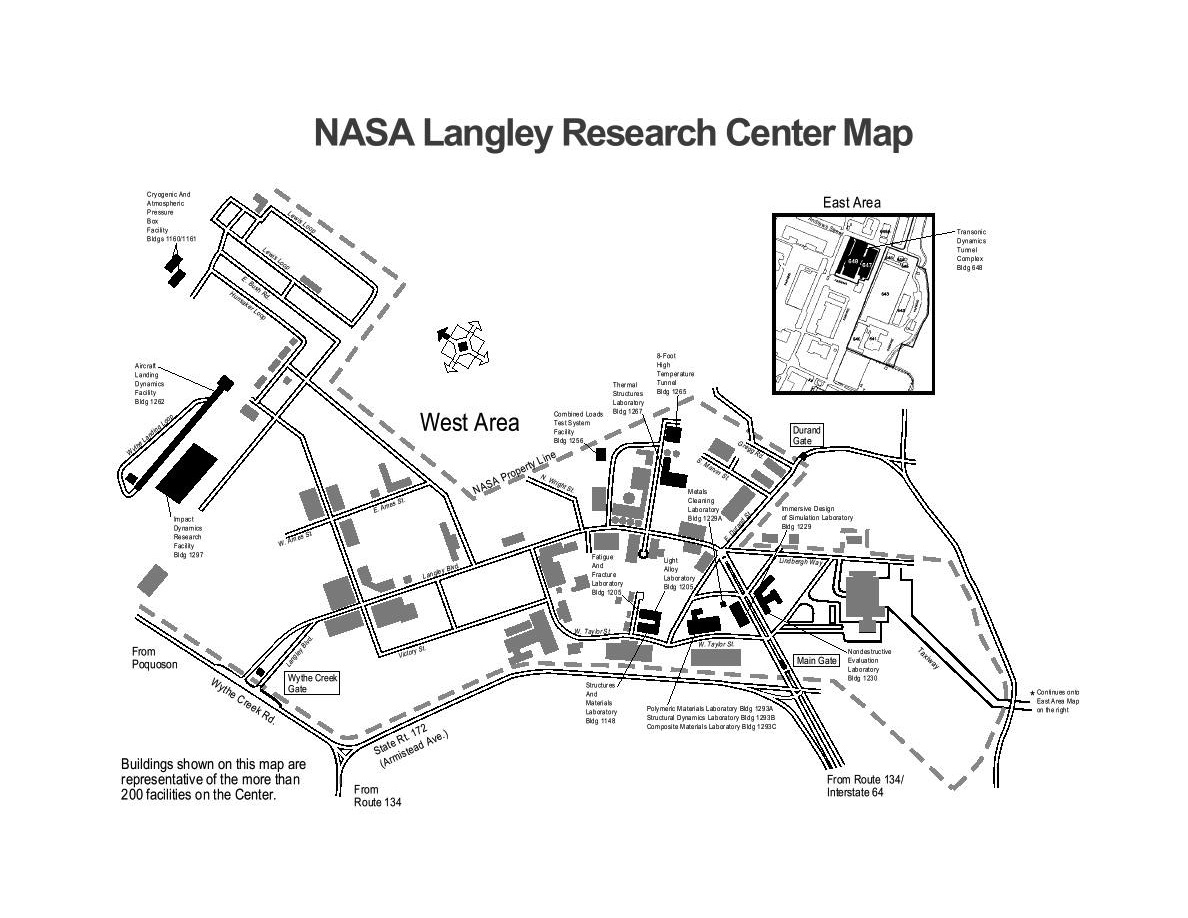
- Map of NASA Langley Research Center

The Langley Research Center (LaRC or NASA Langley), located in Hampton, Virginia, near the Chesapeake Bay front of Langley Air Force Base, is the oldest of NASA's field centers. LaRC has focused primarily on aeronautical research but has also tested space hardware such as the Apollo Lunar Module. In addition, many of the earliest high-profile space missions were planned and designed on-site. Langley was also considered a potential site for NASA's Manned Spacecraft Center prior to the eventual selection of Houston, Texas.

Established in 1917 by the National Advisory Committee for Aeronautics (NACA), the research center devotes two-thirds of its programs to aeronautics and the rest to space. LaRC researchers use more than 40 wind tunnels to study and improve aircraft and spacecraft safety, performance, and efficiency. Between 1958 and 1963, when NASA (the successor agency to NACA) started Project Mercury, LaRC served as the main office of the Space Task Group.

In February 2025, after previously serving as Deputy Director, Dr. Trina Marsh Dyal was appointed the Acting Center Director of NASA Langley.

== History ==
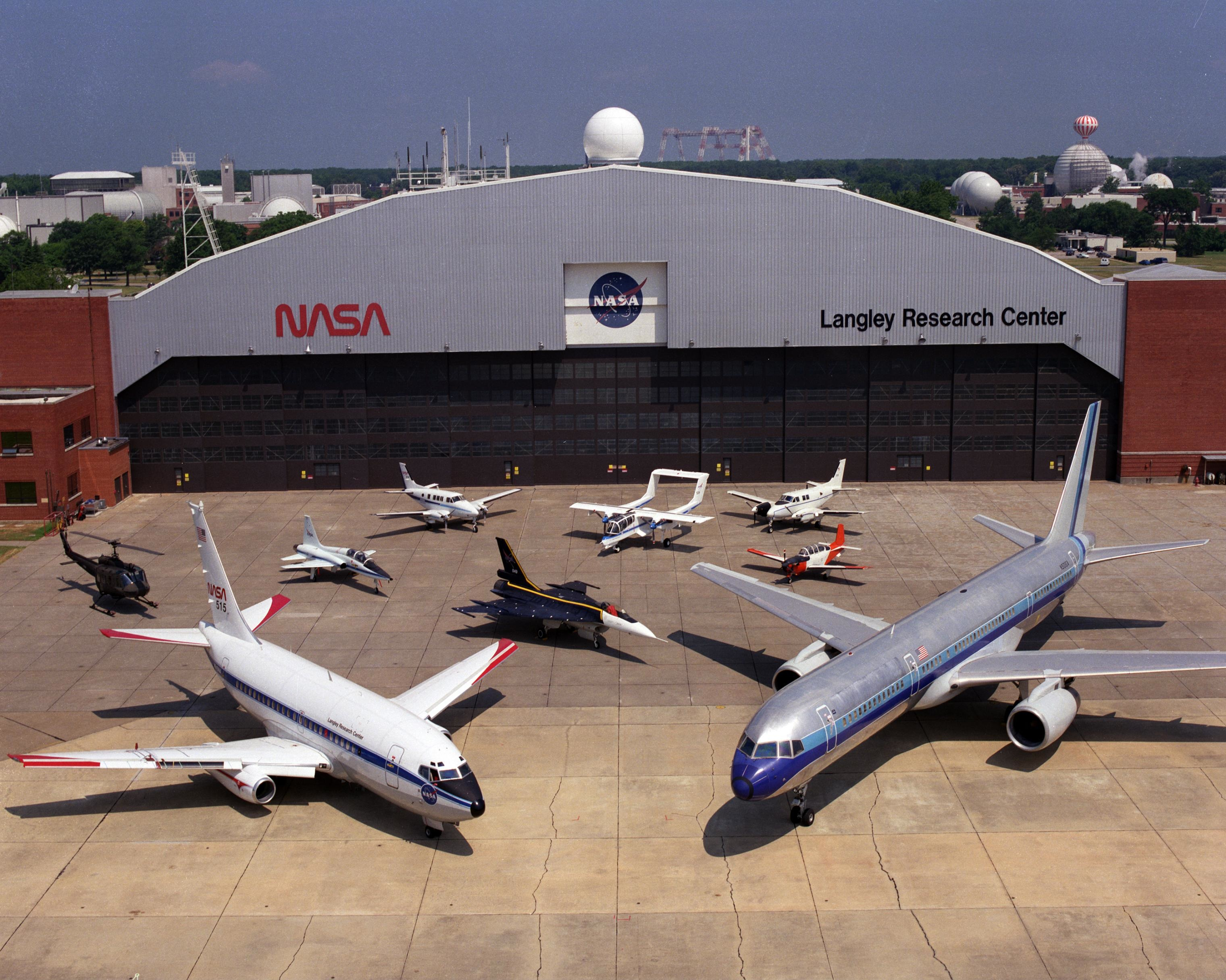
variety of research aircraft at NASA Langley in 1994

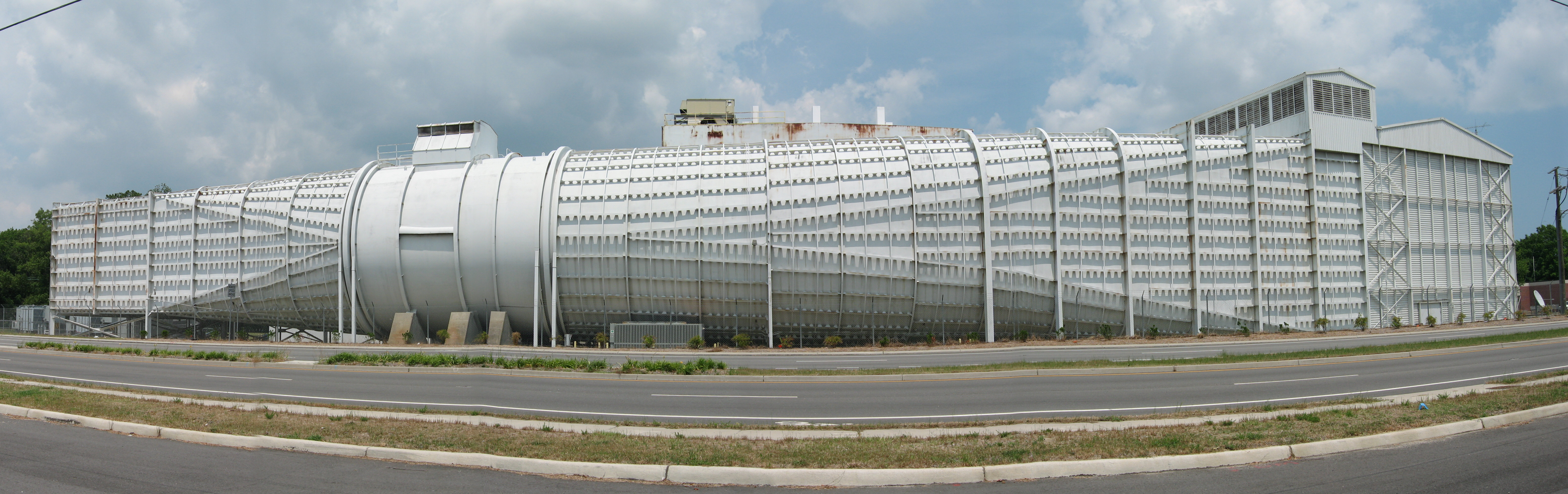
LaRC's 14-by-22-foot (4.3 m × 6.7 m) subsonic wind tunnel

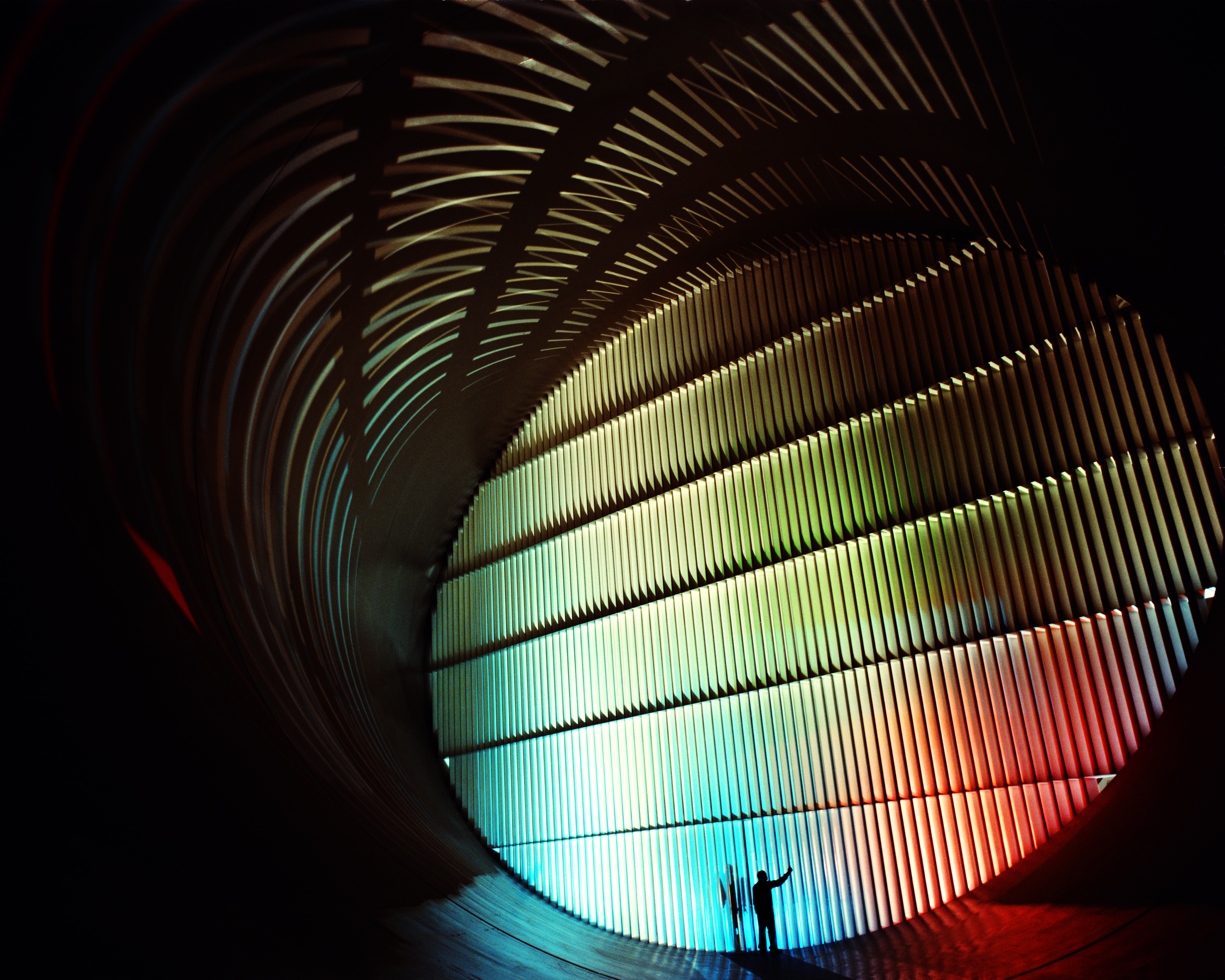
part of the 16 ft (4.9 m) wind tunnel at Langley

After U.S.-German relations had deteriorated from neutral to hostile around 1916, the prospect of U.S. war entry became possible. On February 15, 1917, the newly established Aviation Week warned that the U.S. military aviation capability was less than what was operating in the European war. President Woodrow Wilson sent Jerome Hunsaker to Europe to investigate, and Hunsaker's report prompted Wilson to command the creation of the nation's first aeronautics laboratory, which became NASA Langley.

In 1917, less than three years after it was created, the NACA established the Langley Memorial Aeronautical Laboratory on Langley Field. Both Langley Field and the Langley Laboratory are named after aviation pioneer Samuel Pierpont Langley. The Aviation Section, U.S. Signal Corps had established a base there earlier that same year. The first research facilities were in place and aeronautical research was started by 1920. Initially, the laboratory included four researchers and 11 technicians.

Langley Field and NACA began parallel growth as air power proved its utility during World War I. The center was originally established to explore the field of aerodynamic research involving airframe and propulsion engine design and performance. In 1934 the world's largest wind tunnel was constructed at Langley Field with a 30-by-60-foot (9.1 m × 18.3 m) test section; it was large enough to test full-scale aircraft. It remained the world's largest wind tunnel until the 1940s, when a 40-by-80-foot (12 m × 24 m) tunnel was built at NASA's Ames Research Center in California.

The West Area Computers were African American, female mathematicians who worked as human computers at the Langley Research Center from 1943 through 1958. The West Computers were originally subject to Virginia's Jim Crow laws and got their name because they worked at Langley's West Area, while the white mathematicians worked in the East section.

Early in 1945, the center expanded to include rocket research, leading to the establishment of a flight station at Wallops Island, Virginia. A further expansion of the research program permitted Langley Research Center to orbit payloads, starting with NASA's Explorer 9 balloon satellite in mid-February 1961. As rocket research grew, aeronautics research continued to expand and played an important part when subsonic flight was advanced and supersonic and hypersonic flight were introduced.

Langley Research Center claims many historic firsts, some of which have proven to be revolutionary scientific breakthroughs. These accomplishments include: Development of the concept of research aircraft leading to supersonic flight, the world's first transonic wind tunnel, training the first crews of astronauts, the Lunar Landing Facility which provides the simulation of lunar gravity, and the Viking program for Mars exploration. The center also developed standards for the grooving of aircraft runways based on a previous British design used at Ronald Reagan Washington National Airport. Grooved runways reduce aquaplaning which permits better grip by aircraft tires in heavy rain. This grooving is now the international standard for all runways around the world.

Langley was also a contender for the site of NASA Mission Control, prior to the eventual selection of Houston, due to Langley's prominence with NASA at the time, the large existing aerospace industry already present in the Hampton Roads region, and the proximity to Washington, D.C. The selection of Houston actually took many higher-ups at Langley by surprise and caused some lingering controversy in the surrounding area over the loss and transfer of so many jobs to Houston. Though they had lost out on the Manned Spacecraft Center, Langley still played an important role in conducting research and training during the Apollo Program.

== Departments ==
=== Systems Analysis and Concepts Directorate ===
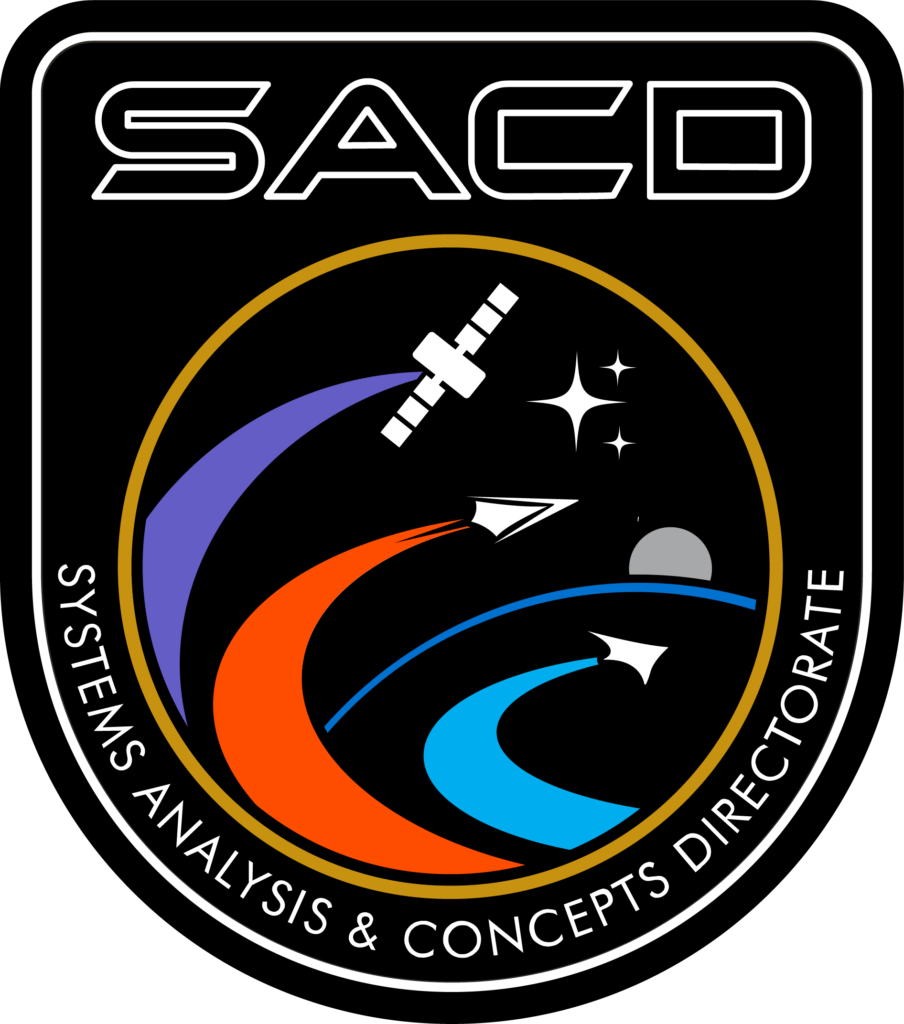
Logo of the Systems Analysis and Concepts Directorate

The Systems Analysis and Concepts Directorate solves problems associated with aeronautics, exploration, and science by analyzing advanced aerospace system concepts for NASA decision makers and programs. The directorate is further broken down into four branches as follows:

- Aeronautics Systems Analysis
  - Creates advanced concepts and technologies to improve the study of aeronautics.
- Space Mission Analysis – Exploration
  - Enables decision making for complex space systems, architecture, and portfolios, primarily focusing on human exploration.
- Space Mission Analysis – Science and Technology
  - Enables decision making for complex space systems, architecture, and portfolios, primarily focusing on remote exploration.
- Vehicle Analysis
  - Designs revolutionary aircraft and launch vehicles.

== Aeronautics ==
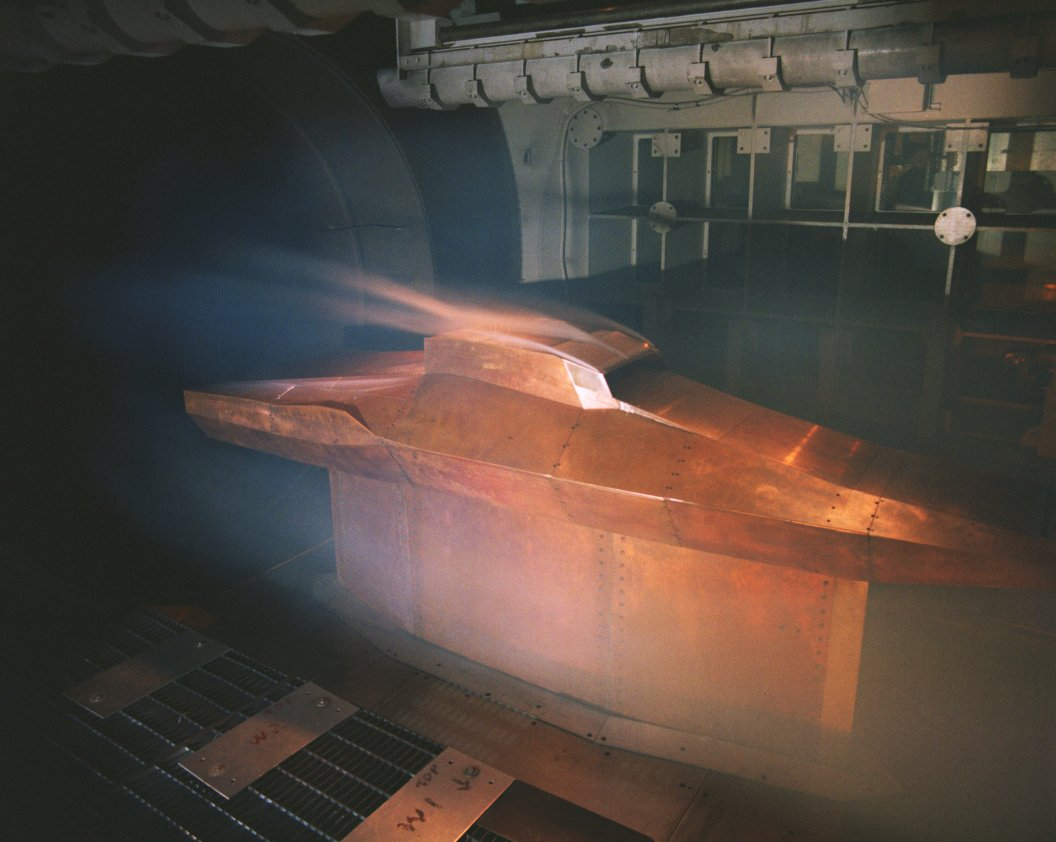
Full-scale model of the X-43 spaceplane in Langley Research Center's 8-foot (2 m) high temperature wind tunnel

Langley Research Center performs critical research on aeronautics, including wake vortex behavior, fixed-wing aircraft, rotary wing aircraft, aviation safety, human factors and aerospace engineering. LaRC supported the design and testing of the hypersonic X-43, which achieved a world speed record of Mach 9.6 (11,800 km/h; 7,310 mph). LaRC assisted the NTSB in the investigation of the crash of American Airlines Flight 587.

Work began in July 2011 to remove the 1940s era 16 feet (4.9 m) transonic wind tunnel. The facility supported development and propulsion integration research for many military aircraft including all fighters since 1960 (F-14, F-15, F-16, F-18 and the Joint Strike Fighter) but had been inactive since 2004. Langley retained transonic wind tunnel testing capabilities facilities in the National Transonic Facility, a high pressure, cryogenically cooled 8.2 feet (2.5 m) closed loop wind tunnel.

== Fabrication research and development ==
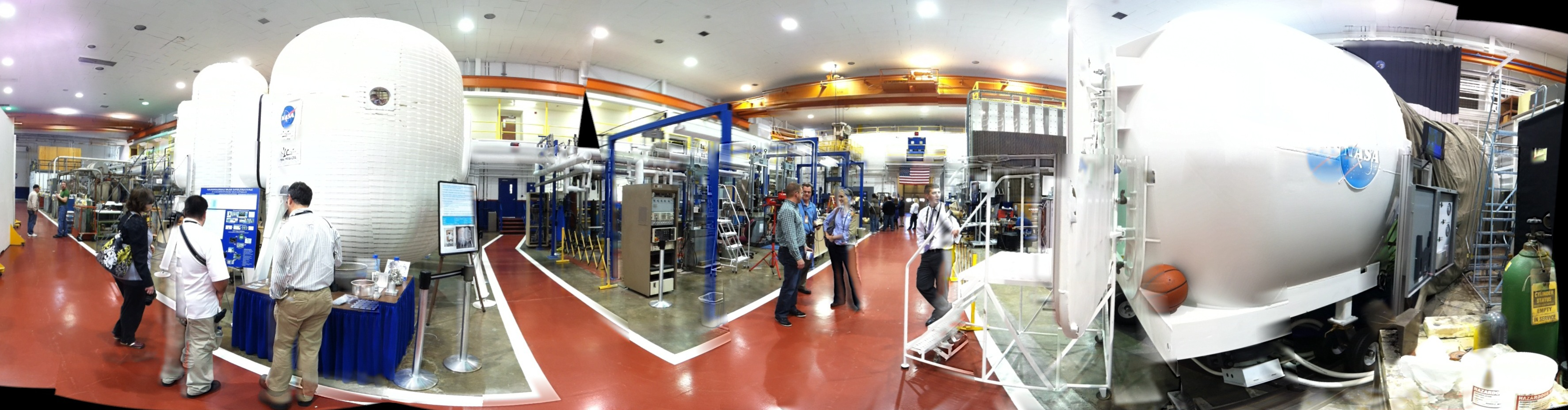
LRC materials research lab

=== Plastic fabrication ===
LaRC also houses a large collection of various inexpensive plastic reformation machines. These machines are used in the freeform fabrication department for faster timing, better precision, and larger quantities of low-cost toys, models, and industrial plastic parts. The fabrication of plastic parts is similar to the EBF³ process but with a thin, grated heating element as its melting apparatus. Both are run by CAD data and deal with various freeform fabrication of raw materials.

== Astronautics ==
=== Moon ===
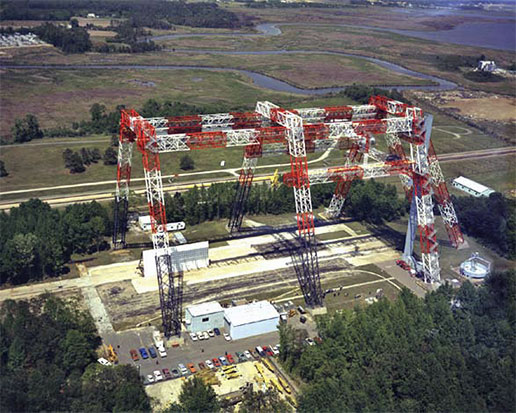
Gantry used in lunar landing training as well as testing of land-based landings of the Orion spacecraft

Since the start of Project Gemini, Langley was a center for training of rendezvous in space. In 1965, Langley opened the Lunar Landing Research Facility for simulations of Moon landings with a mock Apollo Lunar Module suspended from a gantry over a simulated lunar landscape. There was experimental work on some Lunar Landing Research Vehicles (LLRV).

=== Mars ===
Langley Research Center supported NASA's mission with the designing of a spacecraft for a landing on Mars. (see the Mars Exploration Rover.)

=== Earth science ===
Langley Research Center conducts Earth science research to support NASA's mission.

== List of center directors ==
The following persons had served as the Langley Research Center director:

No.	Image	Director	Start	End	Notes
1		Leigh M. Griffith	November 1, 1922	December 31, 1925	Engineer-in-Charge, NACA LMAL
2		Henry J. E. Reid	January 1, 1926	June 1947	Engineer-in-Charge, NACA LMAL
2		Henry J. E. Reid	June 1947	May 1948	Director, NACA LMAL
2		Henry J. E. Reid	May 1948	October 1, 1958	Director, NACA LAL
2		Henry J. E. Reid	October 1, 1958	May 20, 1960	Director
3		Floyd LaVerne Thompson	May 23, 1960	May 1, 1968	
4		Edgar M. Cortright	May 1, 1968	September 26, 1975	
5		Donald P. Hearth	September 26, 1975	November 30, 1984	
6		Richard H. Petersen	December 3, 1984	December 2, 1991	
7		Paul F. Holloway	October 15, 1991	August 2, 1996	
8		Jeremiah F. Creedon	August 5, 1996	June 15, 2002	
Acting		Delma C. Freeman, Jr.	June 15, 2002	June 13, 2003	
9		Roy D. Bridges Jr.	June 13, 2003	October 3, 2005	
10		Lesa B. Roe	October 3, 2005	April 28, 2014	
11		Stephen G. Jurczyk	April 28, 2014	March 1, 2015	
12		David E. Bowles	March 2, 2015	September 30, 2019	
13		Clayton P. Turner	September 30, 2019	July 15, 2024	
Acting		Dawn Schaible	July 16, 2024	February 22, 2025	
Acting		Trina Dyal	February 22, 2025	present	

== Awards ==
LRC scientists and engineers have won the Collier Trophy five times, listed below.

- 1929: for the development of the NACA cowling, a low-drag cowling for radial air-cooled aircraft engines.
- 1946: to Lewis A. Rodert, Lawrence D. Bell and Chuck Yeager for the development of an efficient wing deicing system.
- 1947: to John Stack of the then Langley Memorial Aeronautical Laboratory for research to determine the physical laws affecting supersonic flight. Lawrence D. Bell and Chuck Yeager also shared in this trophy for their work on supersonic flight.
- 1951: to John Stack for the development and use of the slotted-throat wind tunnel.
- 1954: to Richard T. Whitcomb for the development of the Whitcomb area rule, according to the citation, a "powerful, simple, and useful method of reducing greatly the sharp increase in wing drag heretofore associated with transonic flight, and which constituted a major factor requiring great reserves of power to attain supersonic speeds."

== See also ==
- Aerospace engineering
- NASA field centers and other facilities
- TsAGI - Russia's equivalent test center and research institute
- Hidden Figures
- NASA X
