= NASA 360 =

Astronomy podcast from NASA

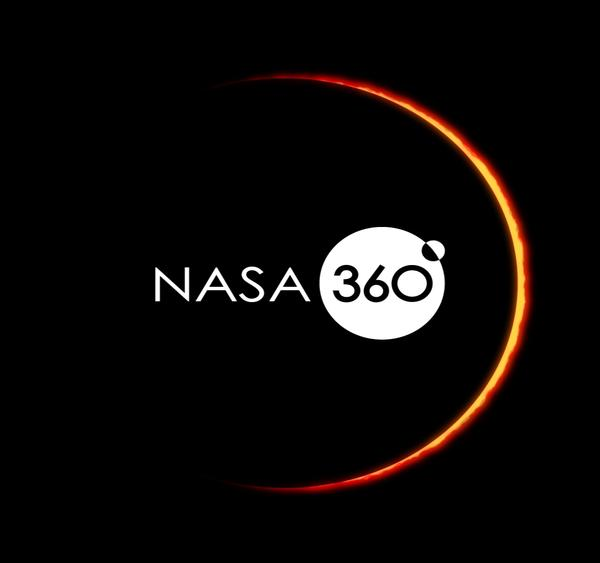
- NASA 360 logo

Presentation
- Genre: Educational; Documentary
- Language: English

Production
- No. of seasons: 5
- No. of episodes: 22

Related
- Website: www.nasa.gov/multimedia/podcasting/nasa360/index.html

NASA 360 is a half-hour vodcast developed by NASA in partnership with the National Institute of Aerospace. The show premiered in August 2008. It has aired on more than 450 TV stations across the country, is available on air and cruise lines, and is consistently one of the top-downloaded programs on the NASA.gov website. It is currently in its tenth season.

== Description ==
NASA 360 is one of four programs in NASA's award-winning eClips suite of web-based shows designed to encourage careers in science, technology, engineering, and mathematics. NASA 360 is written, produced, and edited by Timothy J. Allen, Tom Shortridge, and Scott Bednar; Rebecca Jaramillo is the Senior Educator and Project Coordinator for NASA 360, and Harla Sherwood the Principal Investigator - all of the National Institute of Aerospace.

NASA 360 shows how NASA has changed and continues to change life on Earth by examining how technologies developed by or for NASA are being used in everything from space exploration to everyday consumer products. These include lithium-ion batteries, medical innovations, sporting equipment, and automotive and aircraft safety and efficiency, among many more.

NASA 360 is shot on-location at NASA centers across the country, as well as at other relevant sites across the globe. The fifth season marked the revitalization of NASA 360 and features new hosts Caleb Kinchlow and Molly McKinney, B-roll, animations, and interviews conducted with NASA researchers, engineers, and astronauts, as well as with outside sources with expertise relevant to the topics being discussed.

The show is produced for a young adult audience, and stylistically this is accomplished through the use of hand-held cameras, quick edits, and numerous transitions, effects, and filters used in post-production.

NASA 360 was originally created in 2006 by producers Kevin Krigsvold and Michael Bibbo. It was hosted by Johnny Alonso and Jennifer Pulley through 2012. Twenty-three episodes were produced during this period.

== Online ==
In addition to reaching millions of viewers of traditional broadcast on over 450 stations in the U.S., including every major market. It is also available from numerous outlets, including Hulu.com, iTunes, YouTube, Miro Guide, AOL Video, Red Orbit, and Truveo.

NASA 360 is also available on Hulu.com. Hulu along with Hulu Plus has 29 million unique viewers every month.

NASA 360 is an active member of the social networking communities with more than 5.5 million social media followers and fans on Facebook and 129.8k followers on Twitter as of August, 2020.

NASA 360's "Backstage" photo gallery averages about 5,000 views per week.

NASA 360 has also been mentioned in a Forbes article. The article titled, "NASA Flyby To Triton May Get Green Light Next Summer", was written by Bruce Dorminey. It discussed a possible flyby of the Voyager 2 around Neptune's moon of Triton in 2038.

== Awards and achievements ==
NASA 360 won a Capital Chesapeake Bay Emmy Award on June 15, 2013, for the program, "NASA 360: Robots, Rocks & Rovers." The same episode, which highlights NASA's Sample Return Robot Centennial Challenge also garnered two 2013 Telly awards in the Government and Instructional/Public Outreach categories.

In June 2011, former Director/Editor Michael Bibbo was nominated in the single camera editing category for the National Daytime Emmy Awards.,

NASA 360 has won numerous other awards, including four (4) Communicator Awards for overall program and editing, two (2) Omni Awards for overall program and editing, two (2) Davey Awards for overall program and editing, two Marcom Awards, and two Ava Awards, as well as two (2) Videographer awards, four additional (4) Telly awards (including the 30th Anniversary Telly Award for Overall Program and Editing), and two (2) EMPIXX awards.

In 2010, former Director and first camera operator Michael Bibbo and 2nd camera operator, now Producer, Tom Shortridge won the 2nd place award for NASA Videographer of the Year in the production category.

On June 6, 2009, NASA 360 won the Emmy for non-news program editing from the National Capital Chesapeake Bay Chapter of the National Academy of Television Arts and Sciences, which includes 29 media outlets in Washington D.C., Virginia and Maryland.

NASA 360 has partnered with AMP International to air programs on airlines and cruise lines around the globe. Singapore Airlines, US Air, and Philippines Airlines air NASA 360 as an on-board entertainment option.

As of May 2013, the program had been downloaded nearly 14 million times from the NASA portal.
