= Aaron Ismach =

American scientist and inventor

Aaron Ismach (1920 in Brooklyn, New York - 2007) was an American scientist and inventor, who made a significant contribution to smallpox eradication by inventing the subcutaneous jet injector.

== Biography ==
Born in Brooklyn, he earned a bachelor's degree in chemical engineering from the College of the City of New York in 1943, then a master's degree from the Polytechnic Institute of Brooklyn in 1953 and a MEE from the New York University in 1956.

In the early 1960, Ismach developed a jet injector with an hydraulic pump operated by a foot pedal, known as the Ped-O-Jet.

In 1964, Aaron Ismach invented an intradermal nozzle for the injector, which allowed delivery of the smallpox vaccines. He was awarded the Exceptional Civilian Service Award for his invention. During the 1967 World Health Organization's campaign of eradication of Smallpox, his device capable to vaccinate up to 1000 people an hour, was used for the mass vaccination campaign, being particularly useful on the African continent.
