= Broxton, Hazlehurst and Savannah Railroad =

The Broxton, Hazlehurst and Savannah Railroad was chartered in 1900 and operated a 26-mile (42 km) line between Broxton and Hazlehurst, Georgia, USA. It lasted until 1905 when it merged with the Ocilla and Valdosta Railroad.
