= Ocilla and Valdosta Railroad =

Historical Georgia railroad

Chartered in 1903, the Ocilla and Valdosta Railroad had originally planned on building a railroad from Macon, GA to Valdosta, GA. In 1905 it acquired track between Broxton, GA and Hazlehurst, GA from the Broxton, Hazlehurst and Savannah Railroad. By 1906 it was operating between Broxton and Ocilla, GA and was constructing track to Fitzgerald, GA. The O&V then ran into financial trouble and sold the Broxton to Hazlehurst section to the Douglas, Augusta and Gulf Railway in 1907 and the next year the remainder of the O&V was sold to the Fitzgerald, Ocilla and Broxton Railroad.
