= Jack Smith (defensive back) =

American football player (born 1947)

No. 32
- Position: Defensive back

Personal information
- Born: December 8, 1947 (age 78); Ocilla, Georgia, U.S.
- Listed height: 6 ft 4 in (1.93 m)
- Listed weight: 204 lb (93 kg)

Career information
- High school: Irwin County (Ocilla)
- College: Memphis State (1966–1968); Troy State (1969–1970)
- NFL draft: 1971: 6th round, 133rd overall pick

Career history
- Philadelphia Eagles (1971); Washington Redskins (1973)*
- * Offseason or practice squad member only
- Stats at Pro Football Reference

Jack Smith (born December 4, 1947) is an American former professional football defensive back who played one season with the Philadelphia Eagles of the National Football League (NFL). He was selected by the Eagles in the sixth round of the 1971 NFL draft. He played college football at Memphis State University and Troy State University

== Early life ==
Jack Smith was born on December 4, 1947, in Ocilla, Georgia. He attended Irwin County High School in Ocilla.

== College career ==
Smith was a member of the Memphis State Tigers of Memphis State University from 1966 to 1968 and a letterman in 1967. In 1968, he moved from linebacker to wingback. In October 1968, it was reported that Smith had quit the Memphis State football team. He was later a two-year letterman for the Troy State Red Wave of Troy State University from 1969 to 1970. He had eight interceptions as a senior in 1970.

== Professional career ==
Smith was selected by the Philadelphia Eagles in the sixth round, with the 133rd overall pick, of the 1971 NFL draft. He played in five games for the Eagles during the 1971 season. He was released in 1972.

Smith signed with the Washington Redskins in February 1973. He was waived in July 1973.
