= Ocilla, Georgia =

City in Georgia, United States

- City
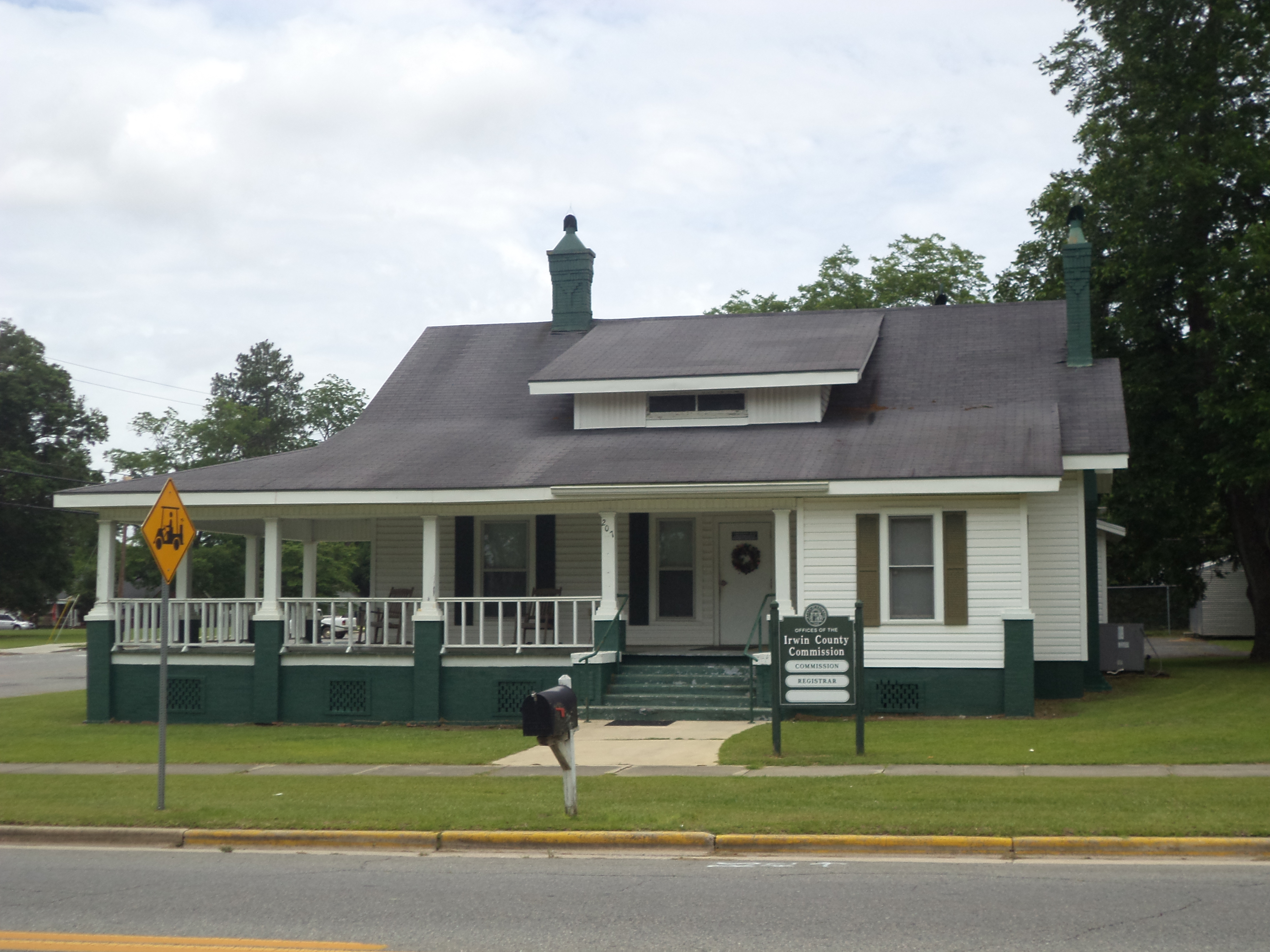
- Ocilla-Irwin Chamber of Commerce in 2013

- Flag Seal

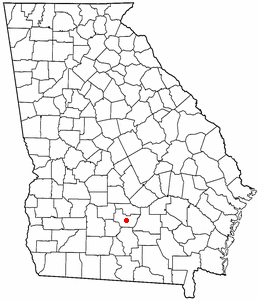
- Location of Ocilla, Georgia
- Coordinates: 31°35′55″N 83°15′0″W
- Country: United States
- State: Georgia
- County: Irwin

Government
  - Mayor: Melvin D. Harper II

Area
  - Total: 2.55 sq mi (6.61 km^{2})
  - Land: 2.54 sq mi (6.59 km^{2})
  - Water: 0.0077 sq mi (0.02 km^{2})
- Elevation: 348 ft (106 m)

Population (2020)
  - Total: 3,498
  - Density: 1,374.4/sq mi (530.66/km^{2})
- Time zone: UTC-5 (Eastern (EST))
  - Summer (DST): UTC-4 (EDT)
- ZIP Code: 31774
- Area code: 229
- FIPS code: 13-57428
- GNIS feature ID: 0332555
- Website: cityofocillaga.gov

The city of Ocilla is the county seat of Irwin County, Georgia, United States. Its population was 3,498 at the 2020 census. Ocilla is part of the Fitzgerald micropolitan statistical area.

== History ==
Ocilla was founded in 1880, incorporated as a town in 1897, and finally re-incorporated as a city in 1902. It is not clear whether Ocilla is named for the Seminole Chief Osceola, for an Oswichee Native American tribe, or, as proposed by historian John Goff, it could be an adaptation of the place name Auscilla. A 1981 Fitzgerald Herald-Leader says that "a tribe of Oswichee Indians once lived near the Ocmulgee River on land known in 1818 as Irwin County." There, towns were called Oswitchee and Ocilla, and sometimes Ocichi. The French census shows that a town called Ocichi existed there in 1750. A later census in 1832 gives Oswhichee as the name of another Indian village close to Osochi." It goes on with "The town's name was changed seven times. It was called by the Indians Assile, next Aglie, Axilla, Agulu, Ochile, and lastly Ocilla." This theory is less popular today.

The most popular theory is that Ocilla is named for Chief Osceola, who had a prominent role in the Second Seminole War. Allegedly, he camped in the area known as Western Heights in Ocilla and frequently could be found in the area until his capture and imprisonment at Fort Moultrie, South Carolina. Osceola is probably the reason that the sports teams in Irwin County are now known as the Indians.

=== Christmas Lady of Ocilla ===
In the 1980s and 1990s Marie Watson was known in Ocilla as the "Christmas Lady." Watson would intricately decorate the property around her home on Cherry Street with lights and Christmas decorations and each year "Santa Claus" would visit the property, taking wishes for gifts from children. Watson became famous for her Christmas cheer but eventually stopped due to the hassle of decorating and because of her older age. Today, her tradition is somewhat carried on every year as the City of Ocilla now decorates Cumbee Park, the public park directly in front of Watson's former home, and holds a yearly session with Santa Claus.

=== Ocilla Raceway or New Veterans Memorial Track ===
On the outskirts of town, Ocilla once hosted the New Veterans Memorial Track (commonly known as the Ocilla Raceway) which was a 3/8 mile layout racing track. It was inaugurated on April 23, 1950. Governor Herman Talmadge was scheduled to attend but was unavailable and the former Governor M.E. Thompson appeared instead. On opening day 2,500 people watched the first program featuring five separate races. James Bennett of Macon, Georgia won the 20-lap featured race and Lucy Stacks of Fitzgerald won the women's race. VFW would eventually take over the track after the original owner, Marion "Buddy" Green, decided that its liabilities were too great.

The races eventually began to run from January to December and hosted drivers from as far away as Atlanta and Northern Florida, as well as some local drivers. It was eventually shut down and the track survives in severe disrepair.

=== Dismuke and Willis Sanitarium ===
Doctors Dismuke and Willis, the first doctors in Ocilla, built and opened its first hospital, the Dismuke and Willis Sanitarium. The building still stands today across from the old Irwin County High School campus, albeit without its prominent porches. It is now a private residence.

=== Railroad ===
The railroad was a prominent factor in the development of Ocilla and Irwin County in the late 19th and early 20th century, with multiple railroads bearing the name of the town. A March 20, 1981 Fitzgerald Herald-Leader article said that at one time, fourteen passenger trains stopped in Ocilla each day. According to Frank Crouch, "The Seaboard passenger trains stopped two times a day," and there was also a railroad shop where trains would have gone for repair.

While no tracks currently connect any industry or passenger service to Ocilla, the remnants of the "Iron Horses" that once whizzed through the area are still visible from track embankments in Irwinville, Georgia to the historical red caboose prominently overlooking Cumbee Park. There were at least four railroads that connected directly to Ocilla.

==== The Ocilla and Irwinville Railroad ====
The Ocilla and Irwinville Railroad was incorporated on October 4, 1900, or earlier and operated 11 miles of track between Ocilla and Irwinville. The railroad owned one locomotive, one passenger carriage, and 46 freight carriages. The railroad was purchased in 1903 by the Brunswick & Birmingham Railroad, which later leased it to the Fitzgerald, Ocilla, & Broxton Railroad in 1911. The 11 miles of track originally built by the Ocilla & Irwinville Railroad were abandoned in 1916 and later removed.

==== The Ocilla and Valdosta Railroad ====
The Ocilla and Valdosta Railroad was chartered in 1903 with plans to connect Valdosta with Macon. By 1906, the railroad had completed its first line from Broxton to Ocilla and had begun the construction on its line from Ocilla to Fitzgerald. It also purchased a line between Broxton and Hazlehurst in 1905 and had started to absorb the Fitzgerald, Ocmulgee, and Red Bluff Railway. Due to financial issues, it sold the Broxton-Hazlehurst line in 1907. In 1908, its remaining properties became the property of the new Fitzgerald, Ocilla, and Broxton Railroad. Like the Ocilla-Irwinville line, the Broxton-Ocilla line was abandoned in 1916.

==== The Fitzgerald, Ocilla, and Broxton Railroad ====
The Fitzgerald, Ocilla, and Broxton Railroad was formed in 1907 to take over the failing Ocilla and Valdosta Railroad lines connecting its namesake cities. As it is said above, the railroad also took over the Ocilla-Irwinville route from the Ocilla and Irwinville Railroad by leasing that railroad from its parent owner, the Brunswick & Birmingham Railroad. Like the Ocilla and Valdosta Railroad, the FO&B soon began to fail. It was forced to lease its tracks between Ocilla and Fitzgerald to the Ocilla Southern Railroad in 1911.

==== The Ocilla Southern Railroad ====
The Ocilla Southern Railroad was incorporated in 1908 and opened its Ocilla-Alapaha line in 1910, leased the Ocilla-Fitzgerald line from the FO&B in 1911, built an extension from Fitzgerald to Rochelle in 1914, and extended its line from Rochelle to Pope City in 1917. From Pope City, the Ocilla Southern extended its line to Nashville and owned all of the 69 miles of track between Ocilla and Nashville except for the 10 miles of Ocilla-Fitzgerald line that it was leasing. In 1917, the Ocilla Southern also leased a line between Pope City and Hawkinsville from the Hawkinsville and Florida Southern Railway and the line between Hawkinsville and Perry from the Hawkinsville and Western Railroad. According to the 1923 Poor's Manual, the Ocilla Southern Railroad wanted to connect Atlanta to Jacksonville, Florida but only ever covered a third of that distance. In 1918, the railroad entered receivership status and by 1923 had begun abandoning most of its lines.

==== The crash of the Dixie Flyer ====
On March 25, 1911, the southbound Dixie Flyer running from Chicago, Illinois to Jacksonville, Florida crashed through a trestle over the Alapaha River, only a short distance from Ocilla. The wreck was found to have been caused by the engine driving wheel axle breaking off. The baggage and express cars, as well as two day coaches, were flung into the water, a steel-construction first class coach car was forced through the sleeper car, the engine stayed on the trestle, and the tender was derailed. Ten people perished as a result, and the line was shut down for 36 hours for all trains. The disaster is considered one of the region's worst train wrecks in history.

== Geography ==
Ocilla is located at 31°35′55″N 83°15′0″W (31.598611, -83.249932).

According to the United States Census Bureau, the city has a total area of 2.6 square miles (6.7 km^{2}), of which 2.6 square miles (6.7 km^{2}) is land and 0.39% is water.

== Demographics ==
Historical population
Census	Pop.	Note	%±
1900	805		—
1910	2,017		150.6%
1920	2,180		8.1%
1930	2,034		−6.7%
1940	2,124		4.4%
1950	2,697		27.0%
1960	3,217		19.3%
1970	3,185		−1.0%
1980	3,436		7.9%
1990	3,182		−7.4%
2000	3,270		2.8%
2010	3,414		4.4%
2020	3,498		2.5%
2023 (est.)	2,949	▼	−15.7%
U.S. Decennial Census; 1850-1870 1870-1880; 1890-1910 1920-1930; 1940 1950 1960; 1970 1980 1990; 2000 2010

=== Racial and ethnic composition ===
Ocilla city, Georgia – Racial and ethnic composition Note: the US Census treats Hispanic/Latino as an ethnic category. This table excludes Latinos from the racial categories and assigns them to a separate category. Hispanics/Latinos may be of any race.
Race / Ethnicity (NH = Non-Hispanic)	Pop 2000	Pop 2010	Pop 2020	% 2000	% 2010	% 2020
White alone (NH)	1,258	1,327	1,110	38.47%	38.87%	31.73%
Black or African American alone (NH)	1,927	1,959	1,789	58.93%	57.38%	51.14%
Native American or Alaska Native alone (NH)	3	2	4	0.09%	0.06%	0.11%
Asian alone (NH)	11	28	105	0.34%	0.82%	3.00%
Native Hawaiian or Pacific Islander alone (NH)	0	0	0	0.00%	0.00%	0.00%
Other race alone (NH)	0	0	18	0.00%	0.00%	0.51%
Mixed race or Multiracial (NH)	13	34	61	0.40%	1.00%	1.74%
Hispanic or Latino (any race)	58	64	411	1.77%	1.87%	11.75%
Total	3,270	3,414	3,498	100.00%	100.00%	100.00%

=== 2020 census ===
As of the 2020 census, Ocilla had a population of 3,498, with 1,100 households and 670 families residing in the city.

The median age was 35.6 years. 22.6% of residents were under the age of 18 and 13.9% were 65 years of age or older. For every 100 females there were 100.6 males, and for every 100 females age 18 and over there were 98.8 males.

0.0% of residents lived in urban areas, while 100.0% lived in rural areas.

Of Ocilla's households, 41.0% had children under the age of 18 living in them. Of all households, 29.2% were married-couple households, 20.4% were households with a male householder and no spouse or partner present, and 44.9% were households with a female householder and no spouse or partner present. About 30.5% of all households were made up of individuals, and 11.9% had someone living alone who was 65 years of age or older.

There were 1,277 housing units, of which 13.9% were vacant. The homeowner vacancy rate was 2.4% and the rental vacancy rate was 4.8%.

== Education ==
=== Irwin County School District ===
The Irwin County School District holds pre-school to grade twelve, and consists of one elementary school, a middle school, and a high school. The district has 123 full-time teachers and over 1,814 students.

- Irwin County Elementary School
- Irwin County Middle School
- Irwin County High School

== Notable people ==
- Paulene Myers (November 9, 1913 - December 8, 1996) was an American actress. She was a pioneer among African–American actors who performed on Broadway stage and appeared on many television series throughout her long career. Myers' career spanned over six decades.
- Randy Christmas (October 14, 1920 - July 27, 1969) was the mayor of Miami, Florida from 1955 to 1957. Was born in Ocilla.
- Dennis Dove (born August 31, 1981), is a former pitcher for the St. Louis Cardinals. Dove graduated from Irwin County High School in Ocilla, Georgia in 2000.
- Justin Anderson (born April 15, 1988) is an American football guard who is currently a free agent. He was selected in the seventh round, 208th overall, by the Indianapolis Colts in the 2012 NFL draft.
- Tyler Harper, Georgia State Senator, from Ocilla.
- Newt Hudson, Georgia state legislator, was born in Ocilla.
- Dave Prater, of the soul duo Sam & Dave, was born in Ocilla in 1937 and grew up singing gospel in the church choir.
- Dr. Robert Andrew Hingson, humanitarian and promoter of the Jet Injector which made mass immunization economical, lived in Ocilla from 1984 to his death in 1996.
- Jack Smith, American football player
- Rodney K. Miller, television host for Small Town Big Deal
- Walt H. Sumner, outfielder and defensive back for Florida State University
- Tara Grinstead, former Irwin County High School teacher who mysteriously disappeared.
