= Justin Anderson (offensive lineman) =

American football player (born 1988)

Justin Lhaksana
No. 71
- Position: Guard

Personal information
- Born: April 15, 1988 (age 38); Ocilla, Georgia, U.S.
- Listed height: 6 ft 4 in (1.93 m)
- Listed weight: 335 lb (152 kg)

Career information
- High school: Irwin County (Ocilla)
- College: Georgia
- NFL draft: 2012: 7th round, 208th overall pick

Career history
- Indianapolis Colts (2012−2013); Orlando Predators (2015)*
- * Offseason or practice squad member only
- Stats at Pro Football Reference

Justin K. Anderson (born April 15, 1988) is an American former professional football guard. He was selected by the Indianapolis Colts in the seventh round of the 2012 NFL draft. He played college football at Georgia. He now coaches his hometown high school team, the Irwin Indians.

== Professional career ==
=== Indianapolis Colts ===
Anderson was selected in the seventh round in the 2012 NFL draft by the Indianapolis Colts. On May 17, 2012, he signed his rookie contract. He began his rookie season on the Physically Unable to Perform (PUP) list and had to sit out the first six games of the season. On November 19, 2012, he was activated to the active roster from the PUP list. The next day, he was waived by the Colts. On November 21, 2012, Anderson was re-signed and placed on the practice squad. On January 7, 2013, he was signed to a Reserve/Future contract. On August 8, 2013, Anderson was waived/injured by the Colts. On August 9, 2013, he cleared waivers and was placed on the Colts' injured reserve list. On February 10, 2014, he was waived by the Colts.

=== Orlando Predators ===
On February 10, 2015, Anderson was assigned to the Orlando Predators of the Arena Football League.
