= Irwin County School District =

School district in Georgia (U.S. state)

Address
- 210 North Apple Street Ocilla, Georgia, 31774-1450; United States
- Coordinates: 31.595471°N 83.256641°W

District information
- Grades: Pre-kindergarten – 12
- Superintendent: Kerry Billingsley
- Accreditation(s): Southern Association of Colleges and Schools; Georgia Accrediting Commission

Students and staff
- Enrollment: 1,622 (2022–23)
- Faculty: 123.70 (FTE)
- Staff: 143.70 (FTE)
- Student–teacher ratio: 13.11

Other information
- Telephone: (229) 468-7485
- Fax: (229) 468-7220
- Website: irwin.k12.ga.us

The Irwin County School District is a public school district in Irwin County, Georgia, United States, based in Ocilla.

It serves the entire population of Irwin County, including the communities of Irwinville and Ocilla.

While the Irwin County portion of Fitzgerald is in the district, as of 2022 no people live in that portion.

== Schools ==
The Irwin County School District has one elementary school, one middle school, one alternative school, and one high school.

Schools

- Irwin County Elementary School
- Irwin County Middle School
- Irwin County High School
