= Walt Sumner =

American football player (born 1947)

No. 29
- Positions: Safety, Cornerback

Personal information
- Born: February 2, 1947 (age 79); Ocilla, Georgia, U.S.
- Listed height: 6 ft 1 in (1.85 m)
- Listed weight: 195 lb (88 kg)

Career information
- High school: Irwin County (Ocilla)
- College: Florida State
- NFL draft: 1969: 7th round, 176th overall pick

Career history
- Cleveland Browns (1969–1974)

Career NFL statistics
- Interceptions: 15
- Fumble recoveries: 3
- Touchdowns: 1
- Sacks: 1
- Stats at Pro Football Reference

Walter Herman Sumner (born February 2, 1947) is an American former professional football player who was a safety for six seasons with the Cleveland Browns of the National Football League (NFL) from 1969 to 1974. He played college football for the Florida State Seminoles and was selected by the Browns in the seventh round of the 1969 NFL/AFL draft.

At Florida State University, Sumner was a two-sport star as an outfielder and defensive back. His 11 collegiate interceptions and two punt returns for touchdowns led to his induction into the FSU Hall of Fame in 1982.
