= Bruce Dorminey =

American science journalist and author

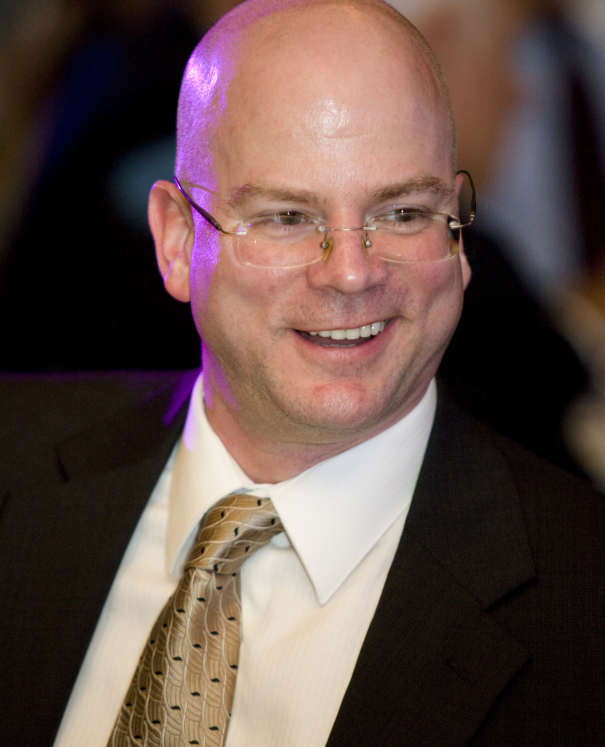
- Bruce Dorminey at the 2009 AJOYA dinner in Paris.
- Born: Ocilla, Georgia
- Education: University of Washington
- Occupation: Science Journalist
- Writing career
- Language: English
- Notable work: Distant Wanderers: the Search for Planets Beyond the Solar System
- Notable awards: AJOYA (1998)

Bruce Dorminey (born March 8, 1959) is an American science journalist and author who primarily covers aerospace, astronomy and astrophysics. He is a regular contributor to Astronomy magazine. Since March 2012, he has written a regular tech column for Forbes.com. He was also a correspondent for Renewable Energy World. He is host of the weekly aerospace and astronomy podcast, The Cosmic Controversy Podcast.

== Biography ==
Dorminey grew up and attended public schools in the small rural town of Ocilla, Georgia, and is a graduate of Irwin County High School and the University of Washington in Seattle. He began his print journalism career in 1988 in New York and then began reporting from Europe, primarily as a film and arts correspondent, mostly for newspaper outlets such as the International Herald Tribune, the Boston Globe, the Dallas Morning News and Canada's The Globe and Mail. While in Europe, he also wrote political and business-related stories.

== Distant Wanderers ==
Distant Wanderers: The Search for Planets Beyond the Solar System is a book, written by Dorminey, which reports on astronomical research and theory related to the search for extrasolar planets, as of the publication date of 2001. It received reviews from publications including Astronomy magazine, USA Today, and New Scientist

== Awards ==
Dorminey was a 1998 winner in the Royal Aeronautical Society's Aerospace Journalist of the Year Awards (AJOYA) in the "Best Systems or Technology Submission" category for a Financial Times article on the European Space Agency's HIPPARCOS mission.

In 2004, Dorminey was a founding team member of the NASA Astrobiology Institute's Science Communication Focus Group.
