= Dennis Dove =

American baseball player (born 1981)

- Relief pitcher
- Born: August 31, 1981 (age 44); Tifton, Georgia, U.S.
- Batted: Right Threw: Right

MLB debut
- April 30, 2007, for the St. Louis Cardinals

Last MLB appearance
- May 5, 2007, for the St. Louis Cardinals

MLB statistics
- Win–loss record: 0-0
- Earned run average: 15.00
- Strikeouts: 1
- Stats at Baseball Reference

Teams
- St. Louis Cardinals (2007)

Dennis Anthony Dove (born August 31, 1981) is an American former pitcher for the St. Louis Cardinals.

Dove graduated from Irwin County High School in Ocilla, Georgia in 2000. He went on to Georgia Southern University and was drafted by the St. Louis Cardinals in the third round of the 2003 amateur draft and was signed on June 30, 2003.
