= Jet injector =

Needle-free medical injection syringe

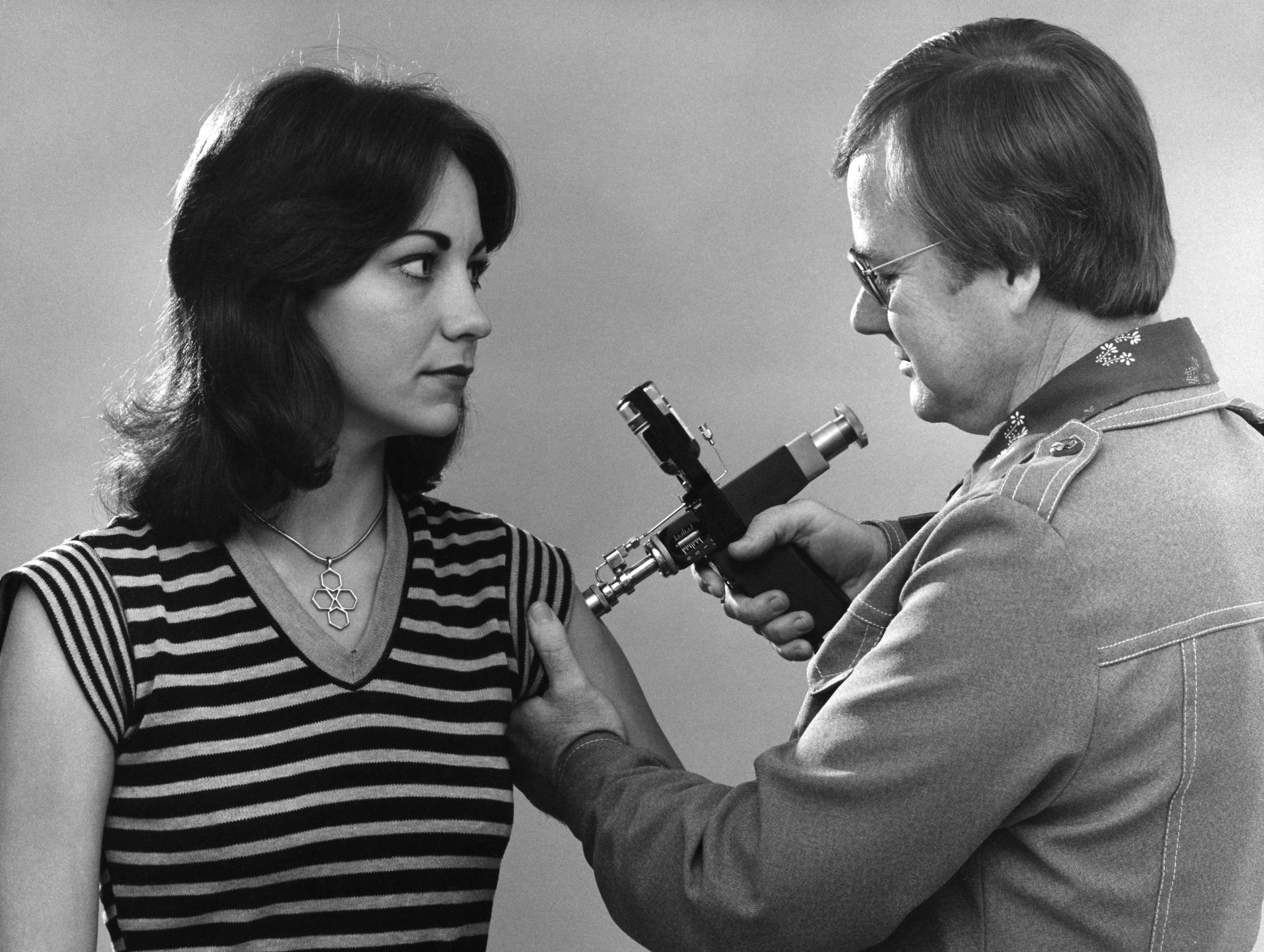
A jet injector being used in mass vaccinations, 1976 swine flu outbreak, United States

A jet injector is a type of medical injecting syringe device used for a method of drug delivery known as jet injection. A narrow, high-pressure stream of liquid is made to penetrate the outermost layer of the skin (stratum corneum) to deliver medication to targeted underlying tissues of the epidermis or dermis (cutaneous injection, also known as classical intradermal injection), fat (subcutaneous injection), or muscle (intramuscular injection).

The jet stream is usually generated by the pressure of a piston in an enclosed liquid-filled chamber. The piston is usually pushed by the release of a compressed metal spring, although devices being studied may use piezoelectric effects and other novel technologies to pressurize the liquid in the chamber. The springs of currently marketed and historical devices may be compressed by operator muscle power, hydraulic fluid, built-in battery-operated motors, compressed air or gas, and other means. Gas-powered and hydraulically powered devices may involve hoses that carry compressed gas or hydraulic fluid from separate cylinders of gas, electric air pumps, foot-pedal pumps, or other components to reduce the size and weight of the hand-held part of the system and to allow faster and less-tiring methods to perform numerous consecutive vaccinations.

Jet injectors were used for mass vaccination, and as an alternative to needle syringes for diabetics to inject insulin. However, the World Health Organization no longer recommends jet injectors for vaccination due to risks of disease transmission. Similar devices are used in other industries to inject grease or other fluid.

The term "hypospray", although better known from its usage in the 1960s television show Star Trek, is attested in the medical literature as early as 1956.

== Types ==
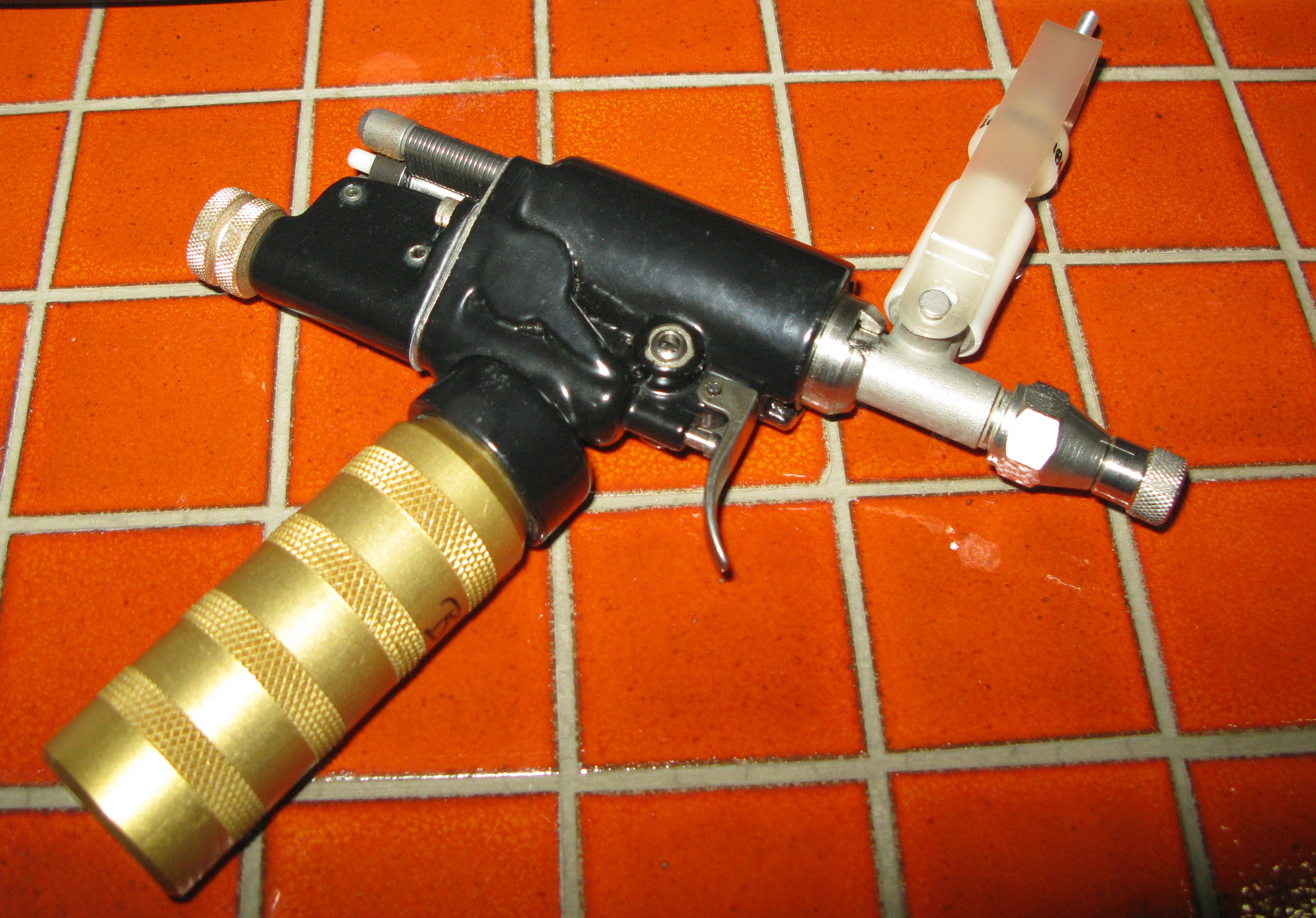
A Med-E-Jet vaccination gun from 1980

A jet injector, also known as a jet gun injector, air gun, or pneumatic injector, is a medical instrument that uses a high-pressure jet of liquid medication to penetrate the skin and deliver medication under the skin without a needle. Jet injectors can be single-dose or multi-dose.

Throughout the years jet injectors have been redesigned to overcome the risk of carrying contamination to successive subjects. To try to stop the risk, researchers placed a single-use protective cap over the reusable nozzle. The protective cap was intended to act as a shield between the reusable nozzle and the patient's skin. After each injection the cap would be discarded and replaced with a sterile one. These devices were known as protector cap needle-free injectors or PCNFI. A safety test by Kelly and colleagues (2008) found a PCNFI device failed to prevent contamination. After administering injections to hepatitis B patients, researchers found hepatitis B had penetrated the protective cap and contaminated the internal components of the jet injector, showing that the internal fluid pathway and patient-contacting parts cannot safely be reused.

Researchers developed a new jet injection design by combining the drug reservoir, plunger and nozzle into a single-use disposable cartridge. The cartridge is placed onto the tip of the jet injector and, when activated, a rod pushes the plunger forward. This device is known as a disposable-cartridge jet injector (DCJI).

The International Standards Organization recommended abandoning the use of the name "jet injector", which is associated with a risk of cross-contamination and rather refer to newer devices as "needle-free injectors".

=== Modern needle-free injector brands ===
Since the late 1970s, jet injectors have been increasingly used by diabetics in the United States. These devices have all been spring-loaded. At their peak, jet injectors accounted for 7% of the injector market. Currently, the only model available in the United States is the Injex 23. In the United Kingdom, the Insujet has recently entered the market. As of June 2015, the Insujet is available in the UK and a few select countries.

Researchers from the University of Twente in the Netherlands patented a Jet Injection System, comprising a microfluidic device for jet ejection and a laser-based heating system. A continuous laser beam – also called a continuous-wave laser – heats the liquid to be administered, which is launched in a droplet form across the epidermis and slows down into the tissue below.

== Concerns ==
Since the jet injector breaks the barrier of the skin, there is a risk of blood and biological material being transferred from one user to the next. Research on the risks of cross-contamination arose immediately after the invention of jet injection technology.

There are three inherent problems with jet injectors:

=== Splash-back ===
Splash-back refers to the jet stream penetrating the outer skin at a high velocity, causing the jet stream to ricochet backward and contaminate the nozzle.

Instances of splash-back have been published by several researchers. Samir Mitragrotri visually captured splash-back after discharging a multi-use nozzle jet injector using high-speed microcinematography. Hoffman and colleagues (2001) also observed the nozzle and internal fluid pathway of the jet injector becoming contaminated.

=== Fluid suck-back ===
Fluid suck-back occurs when blood left on the nozzle of the jet injector is sucked back into the injector orifice, contaminating the next dose to be fired.

The CDC has acknowledged that the most widely used jet injector in the world, the Ped-O-Jet, sucked fluid back into the gun. "After injections, they [CDC] observed fluid remaining on the Ped-O-Jet nozzle being sucked back into the device upon its cocking and refilling for the next injection (beyond the reach of alcohol swabbing or acetone swabbing)," stated Dr. Bruce Weniger.

=== Retrograde flow ===
Retrograde flow happens after the jet stream penetrates the skin and creates a hole, if the pressure of the jet stream causes the spray, after mixing with tissue fluids and blood, to rebound back out of the hole, against the incoming jet stream and back into the nozzle orifice.

This problem has been reported by numerous researchers.

Hepatitis B can be transmitted by less than one nanolitre so makers of injectors must ensure there is no cross-contamination between applications. The World Health Organization no longer recommends jet injectors for vaccination due to risks of disease transmission.

Numerous studies have found cross-infection of diseases from jet injections. An experiment using mice, published in 1985, showed that jet injectors would frequently transmit the viral infection lactate dehydrogenase elevating virus (LDV) from one mouse to another. Another study used the device on a calf, then tested the fluid remaining in the injector for blood. Every injector they tested had detectable blood in a quantity sufficient to pass on a virus such as hepatitis B.

From 1984 to 1985, a weight-loss clinic in Los Angeles administered human chorionic gonadotropin (hCG) with a Med-E-Jet injector. A CDC investigation found 57 out of 239 people who had received the jet injection tested positive for hepatitis B.

Jet injectors have also been found to inoculate bacteria from the environment into users. In 1988 a podiatry clinic used a jet injector to deliver local anaesthetic into patients' toes. Eight of these patients developed infections caused by Mycobacterium chelonae. The injector was stored in a container of water and disinfectant between use, but the organism grew in the container. This species of bacteria is sometimes found in tap water, and had been previously associated with infections from jet injectors.

== History ==
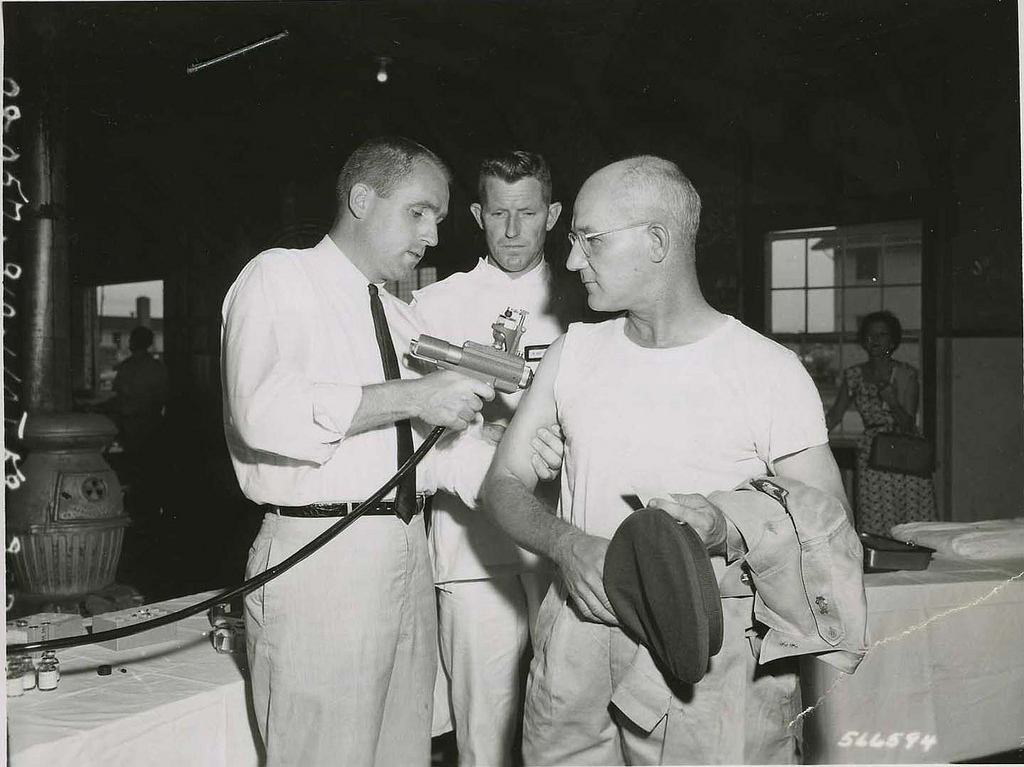
Hypospray Jet Injector used in typhus vaccination at a US military base, 1959

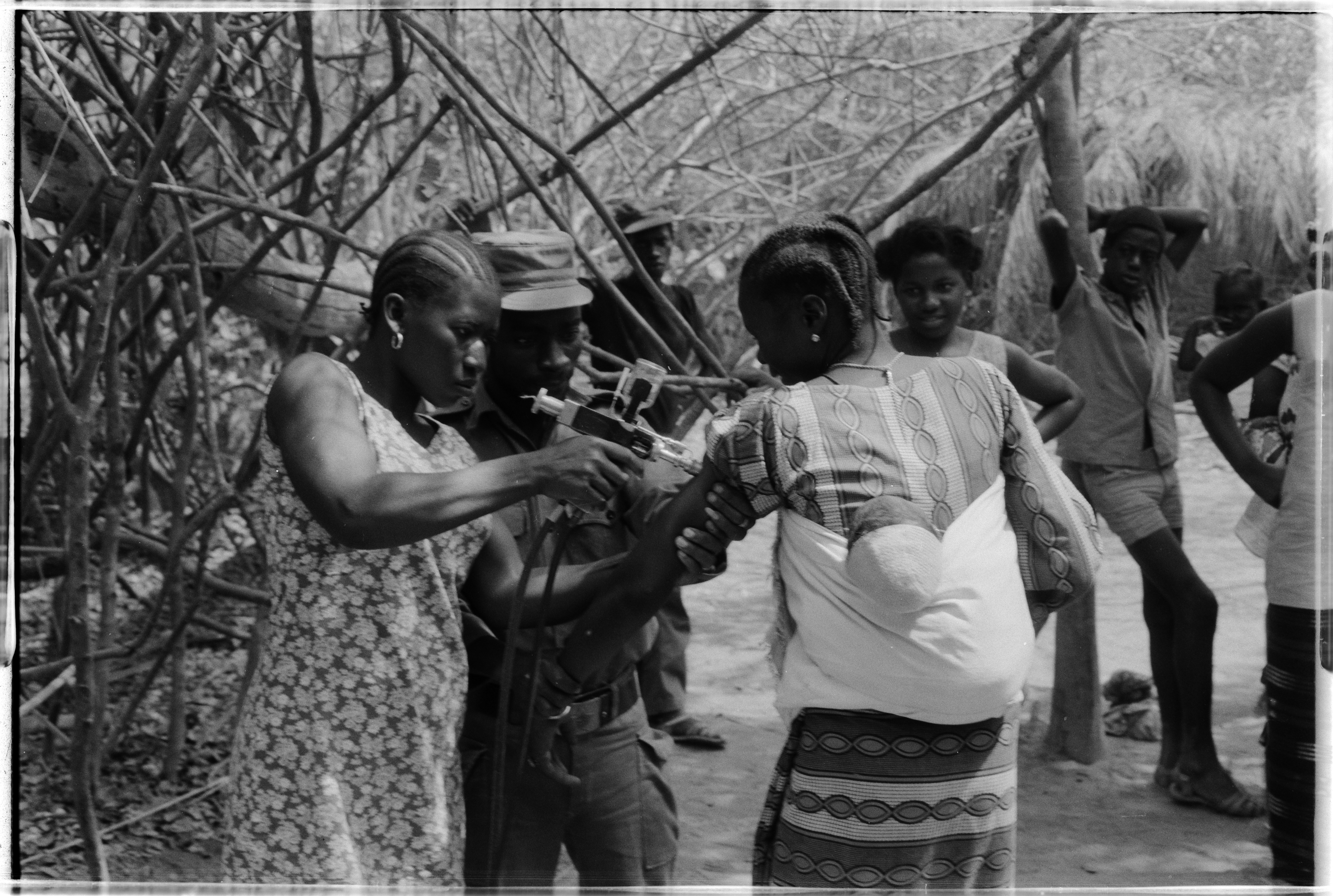
A jet injector being used in 1973, in Campada, Guinea-Bissau

- December 18, 1866: Jules-Auguste Béclard presented Dr. Jean Sales-Girons invention, Appareil pour l'aquapuncture to l'Académie Impériale de Médecine in Paris. This is the earliest documented jet injector to administer water or medicine under enough pressure to penetrate the skin without the use of a needle.
- 1920s: Diesel engines began to be made in large quantities: thus the start of serious risk of accidental jet-injection by their fuel injectors in workshop accidents.
- 1935: Arnold K. Sutermeister, a mechanical engineer, witnessed a worker injure his hand from a high-pressure jet stream and theorized of using the concept to administer medicine. Sutermeister collaborates with Dr. John Roberts in creating a prototype jet injector.
- 1937: First published accidental jet injection by a diesel engine's fuel injector.
- 1936: Marshall Lockhart, an engineer, filed a patent for his idea of a jet injector after learning of Sutermeister's invention.
- 1947: Lockhart's jet injector, known as the Hypospray, was introduced for clinical evaluation by Dr. Robert Hingson and Dr. James Hughes.
- 1951: The Commission on Immunization of the Armed Forces Epidemiological Board requested the Army Medical Service Graduate School to develop "jet injection equipment specifically intended for rapid semiautomatic operation in large-scale immunization programs." This device became known as the multi-use nozzle jet injector (MUNJI).
- 1954–1967: Dr. Robert Hingson partook in numerous health expeditions with his charity, Brother's Brother Foundation. Hingson stated he vaccinated upwards of 2 million people across the globe using various multi-use nozzle jet injectors.
- 1955: Warren and colleagues (1955) reported on the introduction of a prototype multi-dose jet injector, known as the Press-O-Jet, which had successfully undergone clinical testing upon 1,685 soldiers within the U.S. Army.
- 1959: Abram Benenson, the Lieutenant Colonel for the Division of Immunology at Walter Reed Army Institute of Research, reported on the development of what became widely known as the Ped-O-Jet. The invention was the collaboration of Dr. Benenson and Aaron Ismach. Ismach was a civilian scientist working for the US Army Medical Equipment and Research Development Laboratory.
- 1961: The Department of the Army made multi-use nozzle jet injectors the standard for administering immunizations.
- 1961: The CDC implemented mass vaccination programs across the United States called Babies and Breadwinners to combat polio. These vaccination events used multi-use nozzle jet injectors.
- 1964: Aaron Ismach invented an intradermal nozzle for the Ped-O-Jet injector, which allowed delivery of the shallower smallpox vaccinations.
- 1964: Aaron Ismach was awarded the Exceptional Civilian Service Award at the Eighth Annual Secretary of the Army Awards ceremonies for his invention of the intradermal nozzle.
- 1966: Oscar Banker, an engineer, patented his invention of a portable multi-use nozzle jet injector that utilizes CO_{2} as its energy source. This would become known as the Med-E-Jet.
- September 1966: The Star Trek series started to use its own jet injector device under the name "hypospray".
- 1967: Nicaraguans undergoing smallpox vaccinations nicknamed the gun-like jet injectors (Ped-O-Jet and Med-E-Jet) as "la pistola de la paz", meaning "the pistol of peace". The name "Peace Guns" stuck.
- 1976: The United States Agency for International Development (USAID) published a book called War on Hunger which detailed the War Against Smallpox which Ismach's Jet Injector gun was used to eradicate the disease in Africa and Asia. The US government spent $150 million a year to prevent its recurrence in North America.
- 1986: A hepatitis B outbreak occurs amongst 57 patients at a Los Angeles clinic due to a Med-E-Jet injector.
- 1997: The US Department of Defense, the jet injector's biggest user, announced that it would stop using it for mass vaccinations due to concerns about infection.
- 2003: The US Department of Veterans Affairs recognized for the first time that a veteran acquired Hepatitis C from his military jet injections and awarded service-connection for his disability.
- April 2010: A laser-based reusable microjet injector for transdermal drug delivery was made by Tae-hee Han and Jack J. Yoh.
- February 13, 2013: The PharmaJet Stratis Needle-Free Injector received WHO PQS Certification.
- 2013: The most comprehensive review and history of jet injection to date is published in the 6th edition of the textbook Vaccines.
- August 14, 2014: The U.S. Food and Drug Administration (FDA) approved the use of the PharmaJet Stratis 0.5ml Needle-free Jet Injector for delivery of one particular flu vaccine (AFLURIA by bioCSL Inc.) in people 18 through 64 years of age.
- October 2017: A group of scientists publishes an academic study in the Journal of Biomedical Optics, about a new jet injection technique of jet injection by continuous-wave laser cavitation aimed to "develop a needle-free device for eliminating major global healthcare problems caused by needles".
