= Robert Andrew Hingson =

Physician

- Born: Robert Andrew Hingson; April 13, 1913
- Died: October 9, 1996 (aged 82)
- Education: Emory University School of Medicine
- Known for: Western Reserve Anesthesia Machine, Jet Injector mass-inoculation device
- Spouse: Gussie Dickson
- Awards: Labat Award (1981) - American Society of Regional Anesthesia; President's Volunteer Action Award (1987)
- Scientific career
- Fields: Anesthesiology
- Workplaces: University of Tennessee College of Medicine; Johns Hopkins School of Medicine; Case Western Reserve University School of Medicine; University of Pittsburgh Medical Center; Brother's Brother Foundation

Robert Andrew Hingson (April 13, 1913 – October 9, 1996) was an American physician who served as the first professor of anesthesiology at the University of Tennessee College of Medicine. Hingson developed multiple medical devices, including the jet injector for inoculations. He founded the Brother's Brother Foundation, an organization which provides vaccinations and medical assistance to impoverished regions. His awards include the Labat Award from the American Society of Regional Anesthesia and the President's Volunteer Action Award.

== Early life ==
Robert Andrew Hingson was born on April 13, 1913, in Anniston, Alabama, to Eloree Elizabeth Haynes Hingson and Robert Andrew Hingson. Hingson demonstrated a concern for suffering at an early age. Because of this, his parents encouraged him to go into the ministry. Instead, he decided to be a physician.

== Medical career ==
After receiving his medical degree from the Emory University School of Medicine in 1938, Hingson interned at the U.S. Marine Hospital on Staten Island, New York, in 1938, and joined the United States Coast Guard as chief medical officer aboard several ships. While serving in the Atlantic, Hingson treated U.S. Treasury Secretary Henry Morgenthau Jr. who was suffering from an intense migraine, “blind from pain and on the verge of collapse.” As thanks, Morgenthau secured Hingson a position at the Mayo Clinic from 1939 to 1941. After World War II, he was the first professor of anesthesiology at the University of Tennessee College of Medicine. In 1948, he became a professor at Johns Hopkins University School of Medicine and Case Western Reserve University School of Medicine. In 1968 when the University of Pittsburgh offered him an appointment at the University of Pittsburgh Medical Center, together with the University of Pittsburgh School of Dental Medicine, and the University of Pittsburgh Graduate School of Public Health. At the same time, he was made the Chief of Anesthesiology at Magee-Womens Hospital.

== Inventions and innovations ==
Known as a “tinkerer” among friends, Hingson developed several important medical devices such as the Western Reserve Anesthesia Machine, Oxygen Inhalator, and Resuscitator. With the help of colleague Waldo B. Edwards, he also developed the continuous caudal anesthesia epidural administration to alleviate the pain of childbirth. In 1938, Hingson developed a painless method of inoculating patients. Known as the jet injector this was perhaps his greatest contribution to medicine. The discovery was quite accidental. A sailor came to his hospital in Staten Island with a swollen hand. When Hingson examined the patient, he found that his hand was engorged with crude oil. Finding no entry wound, Hingson deduced that a high-pressure oil hose aboard the seaman’s vessel had developed a minute leak. A high-pressure jet of oil had then painlessly perforated the man’s thumb and filled his hand with oil. A fortuitous accident, Hingson not only healed the seaman but began research on a high-pressure injection system for medical use. Before Hingson’s innovation, inoculation as preventive medicine in underdeveloped countries was time-consuming, but with the jet injector, inoculations could be administered at a rate of 1,000 patients per hour. The efficacy of the mass inoculation technology was astonishing. For instance, in 1958, smallpox claimed 150 million victims worldwide. A mere decade later, there were only 65,000 cases. Hingson’s jet injector was also used around the world to inoculate against cholera, influenza, polio, and typhoid.

== Brother's Brother Foundation ==
In 1958, Hingson began a 100-day, 45,000-mile medical mission. With a team of doctors aboard a large plane, they visited Africa, Asia, Europe, and the Middle East performing operations, administering vaccinations, and delivering medical supplies. Among the mission’s accomplishments, in Gaza, the team vaccinated every child under the age of four against polio. Following this mission, Hingson formed Brother’s Keeper; after a Nigerian medical student suggested that, “We don’t need a keeper; we need a brother,” the organization was renamed Brother’s Brother Foundation. Over time, the organization’s mission focused specifically on providing vaccinations and other medical assistance to impoverished regions. Dr. Hingson retired from day to day work at the foundation in 1981.

== Awards ==
Hingson was the recipient of many awards throughout his life. Among them were the Labat Award from the American Society of Regional Anesthesia in 1981 and President Reagan’s President's Volunteer Action Award in 1987. He was also nominated for the Nobel Peace Prize.

== Personal life ==
Robert Hingson married Gussie Dickson in 1940. The couple had five children, the youngest of which—Luke Hingson—succeeded Robert as president of Brother’s Brother Foundation until 2019. And Ozzy Samad, became President of the organization.

== Death ==
Robert Hingson retired to Ocilla, Georgia, in 1984. On October 9, 1996, he died at the Veterans Affairs Medical Center in Lake City, Florida, due to complications of polymyositis.
