= National Register of Historic Places listings in Wayne County, Georgia =

This is a list of properties and districts in Wayne County, Georgia that are listed on the National Register of Historic Places (NRHP).

This National Park Service list is complete through NPS recent listings posted March 21, 2025.

== Current listings ==
	Name on the Register	Image	Date listed	Location	City or town	Description
1	Leonard Carter House	Leonard Carter House	August 31, 1989 (#89001212)	311 S. Wayne St. 31°36′01″N 81°52′56″W	Jesup	
2	Ritch–Carter–Martin House	Ritch–Carter–Martin House	December 10, 1998 (#98001484)	Jct. of US 341/GA 27/Pine St. and Tillman St. 31°39′50″N 82°01′32″W	Odum	Classical Revival house built in c.1915
3	John W. C. Trowell House	John W. C. Trowell House	September 16, 1993 (#93000944)	256 E. Cherry St. 31°36′11″N 81°52′50″W	Jesup	It is now a Bed & Breakfast
4	Wayne County Courthouse	Wayne County Courthouse	September 18, 1980 (#80001261)	Courthouse Sq. 31°36′14″N 81°52′48″W	Jesup	
