= Lonnie A. Pope House =

Historic house in Georgia, United States

- U.S. National Register of Historic Places
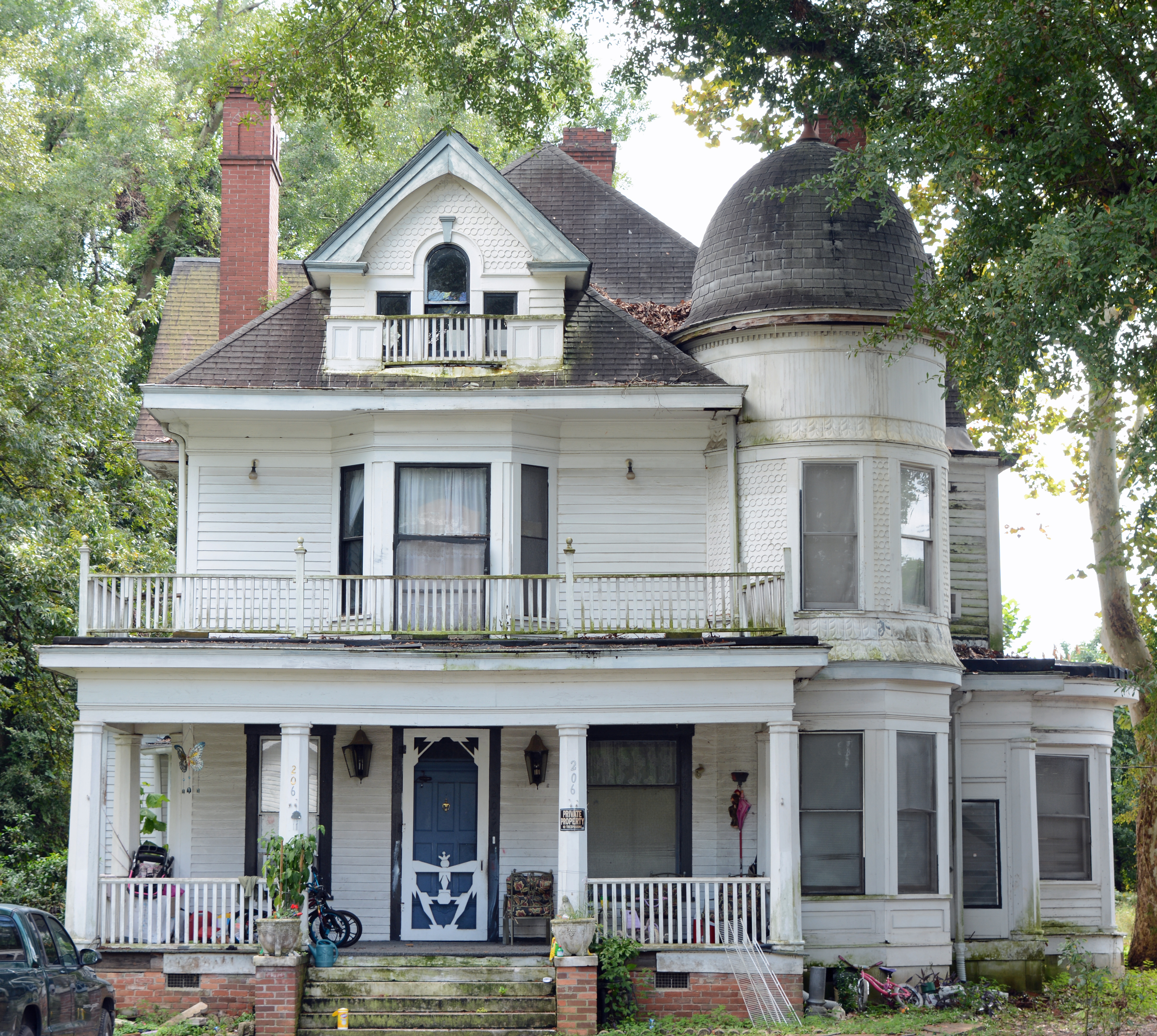

- Location within Georgia
- Location: Jackson St. and Douglas Trail (formerly the Central of Georgia RR tracks), Douglas, Georgia
- Coordinates: 31°30′39″N 82°51′9″W
- Area: 0.5 acres (0.20 ha)
- Built: 1910
- Built by: Stone, Walter
- Architect: Barber & Kluttz
- Architectural style: Queen Anne
- NRHP reference No.: 82002395
- Added to NRHP: June 17, 1982

The Lonnie A. Pope House in Douglas, Georgia is a Barber & Kluttz-designed historic house built in 1910. It was listed on the National Register of Historic Places in 1982. It is located at Jackson St. and Douglas Trail (which formerly was the Central of Georgia Railroad tracks).

In 1982, it was deemed "an outstanding example of the Queen Anne style of architecture" and was asserted to be one of few houses designed in that style in Southeast Georgia. (Note: Other NRHP-listed Queen Anne houses in Southeast Georgia include the Leonard Carter House and John W. C. Trowell House in Wayne County, and the C. W. Deen House in Appling County.) Its interior is also high-style Queen Anne. The house is interesting for having signed architectural plans in existence.

The house was vacant in 1980.
