= List of county seats in Georgia =

The U.S. state of Georgia is divided into 159 counties, more than any other state except for Texas, which has 254 counties. Under the Georgia State Constitution, all of its counties are granted home rule to deal with problems that are purely local in nature. Each county has a county seat. In Georgia, county seats typically have a courthouse at a town square. Of the current 159 counties and two historic counties, 47 counties have changed their county seat at least once.

== History ==
When counties were established some counties already had towns, which were soon named county seats. Several counties upon establishment lacked populations centers and did not have a county seat for a year or more. Typically during those periods without a definite county seat, county courts and other local government business was held at the residences of community leaders or at churches. A county changing county seats in Georgia has become very rare since the 1920s, as has the creation of new counties. The last county to legally change its county seat was Bryan County because of the establishment of Fort Stewart in the 1930s. Columbia County has two county seats; Evans has been Columbia County's de facto county seat since the 1980s, while Appling remains as the de jure county seat.

While some Georgian counties have kept their same county seat since they were first created, many other counties have had their county seat changed one or more times. County seats in Georgia have changed over time for a variety of reasons. Among the more common reasons for county seats being changed include:

- Towns along waterways growing as steamships were introduced
- Railroads bypassing the county seat
- Shifting county lines changing the center of population

A few county seats have regained their position of county seat after losing it:

- Morgan was the county seat of Calhoun County from 1856 to 1923; it was re-designated the county seat in 1929
- Stark(s)ville was the county seat of Lee County from 1832 to 1854, and then again from 1856 to 1872
- Vienna, then known as Berrien, was the county seat of Dooly County from 1826 to 1836; it was re-designated the county seat in 1841
- Waynesville was the county seat of Wayne County for several nonconsecutive periods in the mid-1800s

Three county seats have later become the county seats of other counties:

- Pond Town was the temporary county seat of Lee County, Georgia when the county was first established from Muscogee (Creek) Nation lands in 1826. The county was very large and otherwise lacked European-American settlement. It was replaced in 1828. Pond Town evolved to become the town of Ellaville and became the county seat of Schley County in 1857.
- Lumpkin was named the county seat of Randolph County on December 2, 1830. On December 23, 1830 Stewart County was created from the section of Randolph where Lumpkin was. Lumpkin became the county seat of Stewart County on December 30, 1830.
- Watkinsville was the county seat of Clarke County from 1802 to 1871 when it was replaced by Athens, and then became the county seat of Oconee in 1875 when it was created.

On three occasions, the creation of new counties has put a current county seat completely outside of the new boundaries of a county:

- In 1812, when Emanuel County was created from Montgomery County, the county seat of the plantation of Arthur Lott was transferred to the new county
- In 1830, Lumpkin was named the county seat of Randolph County; three weeks later Stewart County was created
- In 1851, Van Wert, Georgia the county seat of Paulding County was transferred to Polk County when it was created

== County seat listing ==
List of County Seats of Georgia
County	County Seat	Date	Notes	Coordinates
Appling; Created 1818	Holmesville	1828	Holmesville was known as Appling Court House from 1828 until May 1831.	31.704080°N 82.320398°W
Appling; Created 1818	Baxley	1873	Established in 1870 as Station Number 7 of the Macon and Brunswick Railroad.	31.778091°N 82.349246°W
Atkinson; Created 1917	Pearson	1917	Established in 1875 as a depot of the Brunswick and Western Railroad.	31.298333°N 82.852778°W
Bacon; Created 1914	Alma	1914	Established in 1900 as a depot of the Atlantic Coast Line Railroad.	31.541667°N 82.466667°W
Baker; Created 1825	Byron	1828		31.611492°N 84.274849°W
Baker; Created 1825	Newton	1837	On the banks of the Flint River.	31.316667°N 84.339444°W
Baldwin; Created 1803	Hillsborough	1806		33.179722°N 83.641111°W
Baldwin; Created 1803	Milledgeville	1807	Established 1803 on the Oconee River. State capital from 1804 to 1868.	33.087778°N 83.233333°W
Banks; Created 1859	New Lebanon	1859	Designated the temporary county seat upon establishment of county in February 1859.	
Banks; Created 1859	Homer	1859		34.333889°N 83.499722°W
Barrow; Created 1914	Winder	1914		33.303333°N 83.685833°W
Bartow; Created 1832	Cassville	1833	Destroyed by General Sherman's troops in 1864 during the American Civil War.	34.243889°N 84.852778°W
Bartow; Created 1832	Cartersville	1867	Voted as new county seat in January 1867.	34.165929°N 84.797749°W
Ben Hill; Created 1906	Fitzgerald	1906	Established in 1895 as a colony for Union Veterans	31.715556°N 83.256389°W
Berrien; Created 1856	Nashville	1856		31.206944°N 83.246667°W
Bibb; Created 1822	Macon	1822	Incorporated in 1823.	32.834722°N 83.651667°W
Bleckley; Created 1912	Cochran	1912		32.386667°N 83.350556°W
Brantley; Created 1920	Hoboken	1920		31.182778°N 82.133889°W
Brantley; Created 1920	Nahunta	1923	Changed after a referendum.	31.204444°N 81.982222°W
Brooks; Created 1858	Quitman	1858		30.784722°N 83.560833°W
Bryan; Created 1793	Hardwick	1793		
Bryan; Created 1793	Bryan Courthouse	1797	Also known as Cross Roads. Near modern Richmond Hill.	30.784722°N 81.312399°W
Bryan; Created 1793	Clyde	1814	Established as Mansford. Renamed as Eden. Renamed Bryan. Later renamed as Clyde	32.0110°N 81.4089°W
Bryan; Created 1793	Pembroke	1937	Established in 1892. County seat moved to Pembroke because of the establishment of Fort Stewart	32.135908°N 81.621857°W
Bulloch; Created 1796	Statesboro	1803		32.445278°N 81.779167°W
Burke; Created 1777	Waynesboro	1777		33.090556°N 82.015278°W
Butts; Created 1825	Jackson	1826		33.293611°N 83.966709°W
Calhoun; Created 1854	Morgan	1856		31.538889°N 84.601111°W
Calhoun; Created 1854	Arlington	1923	Changed by referendum following a petition.	31.439444°N 84.724722°W
Calhoun; Created 1854	Morgan	1929	Changed by referendum following a petition.	31.538889°N 84.601111°W
Camden; Created 1777	St. Patrick	1787		
Camden; Created 1777	Jefferson	1800	Later known as Jeffersonton.	30.967265°N 81.790451°W
Camden; Created 1777	St. Marys	1869	Changed by referendum with the other choice having been Satilla Mills.	30.756389°N 81.571389°W
Camden; Created 1777	Woodbine	1923	Incorporated in 1908.	30.963758°N 81.722830°W
Campbell; Created 1828; Merged with Fulton in 1932	Campbellton	1829		33.650278°N 84.669444°W
Campbell; Created 1828; Merged with Fulton in 1932	Fairburn	1871	Established in 1830. In 1853, the Atlanta and West Point Railroad passed through the community. Changed by referendum.	33.5625°N 84.581389°W
Candler; Created 1914	Metter	1914		32.396389°N 82.0625°W
Carroll; Created 1826	Old Carrollton	1827		33.6331°N 84.9841°W
Carroll; Created 1826	Carrollton	1829	More centrally located.	33.580833°N 85.076667°W
Catoosa; Created 1853	Ringgold	1854		34.917222°N 85.115833°W
Charlton; Created 1854	Trader's Hill	1855		30.779759°N 82.030899°W
Charlton; Created 1854	Folkston	1901	Established as a stop on Savannah, Florida and Western Railroad in 1880. Changed to county seat after a referendum.	30.834444°N 82.004722°W
Chatham; Created 1777	Savannah	1777	De facto county seat from establishment of county system. De jure county seat on 1784.	32.016667°N 81.116667°W
Chattahoochee; Created 1854	Cusseta	1854		32.305556°N 84.776944°W
Chattooga; Created 1838	Summerville	1838		32.305556°N 84.776944°W
Cherokee; Created 1831	Canton	1833		34.227222°N 84.494722°W
Clarke; Created 1801	Watkinvsille	1802	Became county seat of Oconee County in 1875.	33.862778°N 83.408056°W
Clarke; Created 1801	Athens	1871		33.951986°N 83.383333°W
Clay; Created 1854	Fort Gaines	1854		31.614167°N 85.048333°W
Clayton; Created 1858	Jonesboro	1858		33.524444°N 84.354167°W
Clinch; Created 1850	Magnolia	1850		30.9404°N 82.7820°W
Clinch; Created 1850	Homerville	1860	Became Station Number 11 on the Atlantic and Gulf Railroad in 1859.	31.036944°N 82.751389°W
Cobb; Created 1832	Marietta	1834		33.953333°N 84.540556°W
Coffee; Created 1854	Douglas	1855		31.5075°N 82.850833°W
Colquitt; Created 1854	Moultrie	1859		31.166667°N 83.783333°W
Columbia; Created 1790	Cobbham	1790		33.5690°N 82.4326°W
Columbia; Created 1790	Brownsborough	1790	Competing county seat.	
Columbia; Created 1790	Kiokee	1790s		
Columbia; Created 1790	Appling	1792	De jure county seat.	33.545833°N 82.315833°W
Columbia; Created 1790	Evans	1980s	De facto county seat.	33.5375°N 82.127778°W
Cook; Created 1918	Adel	1918		31.138333°N 83.425833°W
Coweta; Created 1826	Newnan	1828		33.376389°N 84.788611°W
Crawford; Created 1822	Knoxville	1823		31.648333°N 83.382778°W
Crisp; Created 1905	Cordele	1905		31.964167°N 83.777222°W
Dade; Created 1837	Trenton	1839		34.875556°N 85.508611°W
Dawson; Created 1857	Dawsonville	1857		34.421205°N 84.119080°W
Decatur; Created 1823	Bainbridge	1824		30.904722°N 84.571111°W
DeKalb; Created 1822	Decatur	1823		33.771389°N 84.297778°W
Dodge; Created 1870	Eastman	1870		32.197778°N 83.179167°W
Dooly; Created 1821	Berrien	1826	Name changed to Drayton in 1833.	32.091408°N 83.796366°W
Dooly; Created 1821	Drayton	1836	Same name, but new location near the Flint River.	32.074500°N 83.955800°W
Dooly; Created 1821	Glascock	1839	Authorized but never established.	
Dooly; Created 1821	Vienna	1841	Located at the same site of Berrien.	32.091408°N 83.796366°W
Dougherty; Created 1853	Albany	1853		31.582222°N 84.165556°W
Douglas; Created 1870	Douglasville	1874		33.749722°N 84.723056°W
Early; Created 1818	Blakely	1826		31.376667°N 84.933889°W
Echols; Created 1858	Statenville	1859		30.703454°N 83.028043°W
Effingham; Created 1777	Tuckasee King	1784		32.5322°N 81.2767°W
Effingham; Created 1777	Elberton	1787	Located on the Ogeechee River when Effingham included much of modern Bulloch and Bryan counties.	
Effingham; Created 1777	Ebenezer	1797	Temporary count seat.	32.376667°N 81.180833°W
Effingham; Created 1777	Springfield	1799		32.368333°N 81.310278°W
Elbert; Created 1790	Elberton	1790		34.109722°N 82.865556°W
Emanuel; Created 1812	Swainsboro	1822		32.593611°N 82.332222°W
Evans; Created 1914	Claxton	1914		32.160833°N 81.908611°W
Fannin; Created 1854	Morganton	1854		34.876667°N 84.245556°W
Fannin; Created 1854	Blue Ridge	1895	Established in 1886 along the path of the Marietta and North Georgia Railroad, which had bypassed Morganton. Changed by referendum.	34.868333°N 84.321111°W
Fayette; Created 1821	Fayetteville	1823		33.447778°N 84.461667°W
Floyd; Created 1832	Livingston	1833		34.212778°N 85.348611°W
Floyd; Created 1832	Rome	1834		34.257101°N 85.164660°W
Forsyth; Created 1832	Cumming	1834		34.207090°N 84.140098°W
Franklin; Created 1784		1793	Location unknown, but not Carnesville.	
Franklin; Created 1784	Carnesville	1805		34.371389°N 83.233611°W
Fulton; Created 1853	Atlanta	1853		33.755°N 84.39°W
Gilmer; Created 1832	Ellijay	1834		34.694722°N 84.48361°W
Glascock; Created 1857	Gibson	1857		33.232778°N 82.595278°W
Glynn; Created 1777	Fort Frederica	1777		31.22384°N 81.39324°W
Glynn; Created 1777	Brunswick	1797	Established in 1771. Site of county elections in 1787. Designated county seat in 1797.	31.158889°N 81.489167°W
Gordon; Created 1850	Calhoun	1851		34.502561°N 84.216667°W
Grady; Created 1905	Cairo	1905		30.883333°N 84.951046°W
Greene; Created 1786	Greensboro	1787	Designated permanent county seat in 1802.	33.571667°N 83.180833°W
Gwinnett; Created 1818	Lawrenceville	1820		33.953056°N 83.9925°W
Habersham; Created 1818	Clarkesville	1823		34.612961°N 83.524226°W
Hall; Created 1818	Gainesville	1821		34.304444°N 83.833889°W
Hancock; Created 1793	Sparta	1797		33.283333°N 82.966667°W
Haralson; Created 1856	Buchanan	1856		33.801667°N 85.183611°W
Harris; Created 1827	Hamilton	1828		32.764722°N 84.873056°W
Hart; Created 1853	Hartwell	1854		34.352778°N 82.931111°W
Heard; Created 1830	Franklin	1831		33.279722°N 85.098333°W
Henry; Created 1821	McDonough	1823		33.447181°N 84.146925°W
Houston; Created 1821	Perry	1823		32.458219°N 83.731621°W
Irwin; Created 1818	Irwinville	1831		31.648333°N 83.382778°W
Irwin; Created 1818	Ocilla	1907	Established in 1880. A railroad connected Ocilla to other major cities in the 1890s.	31.594219°N 83.250554°W
Jackson; Created 1796	Clarkesboro	1799		
Jackson; Created 1796	Jefferson	1800		34.126667°N 83.590278°W
Jasper; Created 1807	Monticello	1808		33.303333°N 83.685833°W
Jeff Davis; Created 1905	Hazlehurst	1905		31.866111°N 82.599444°W
Jefferson; Created 1796	Louisville	1796	State capital from 1796 to 1806.	33.004167°N 82.404722°W
Jenkins; Created 1905	Millen	1905		32.803847°N 81.949109°W
Johnson; Created 1858	Wrightsville	1859		32.729478°N 82.719613°W
Jones; Created 1807	Clinton	1808		32.998590°N 83.555316°W
Jones; Created 1807	Gray	1905	Citizens of Clinton refused to have the Macon and Northern Railroad built through their town in the 1890s. Gray grew up along the route the railroad was built.	33.0086°N 83.5342°W
Lamar; Created 1920	Barnesville	1920		33.053056°N 84.156111°W
Lanier; Created 1920	Lakeland	1920		31.039167°N 83.070278°W
Laurens; Created 1807	Sumterville	1809		
Laurens; Created 1807	Dublin	1811		32.5375°N 82.918333°W
Lee; Created 1825	Pond Town	1826	Temporary county seat. Later became the county seat of Schley County under the name of Ellaville.	32.230740°N 84.308673°W
Lee; Created 1825	Sumterville	182?		
Lee; Created 1825	Stark(s)ville	1832	On the banks of Muckalee Creek.	31.7712°N 84.1455°W
Lee; Created 1825	Webster	1854		
Lee; Created 1825	Stark(s)ville	1856	On the banks of Muckalee Creek.	31.7712°N 84.1455°W
Lee; Created 1825	Leesburg	1872	Established as a station in 1870 on the Southwestern Railroad.	31.732778°N 84.170833°W
Liberty; Created 1825	Sunbury	1784		31.7675°N 81.2811°W
Liberty; Created 1825	Riceborough	1789	Slightly more centrally located and further inland.	31.735278°N 81.440278°W
Liberty; Created 1825	Hinesville	1837	Changed by referendum. More centrally located.	31.8325°N 81.611667°W
Lincoln; Created 1796	Lincolnton	1798		33.794444°N 82.476389°W
Long; Created 1920	Ludowici	1920		31.710556°N 81.744444°W
Lowndes; Created 1825	Franklinville	1828		30.982840°N 83.277446°W
Lowndes; Created 1825	Lowndesville	1834	Only established as a county seat by law and never established physically.	30.811781°N 83.373111°W
Lowndes; Created 1825	Troupville	1837	Located at the confluence of the Withlacoochee River and the Little River.	30.852822°N 83.344491°W
Lowndes; Created 1825	Valdosta	1860	Established on the route of the Atlantic and Gulf Railroad.	30.846667°N 83.283056°W
Lumpkin; Created 1832	Auraria	1832		34.4745°N 84.0237°W
Lumpkin; Created 1832	Dahlonega	1833	Site of the Georgia Gold Rush of 1829.	34.533333°N 83.983333°W
Macon; Created 1837	Lanier	1838		32.352050°N 84.064263°W
Macon; Created 1837	Oglethorpe	1856	The Southwestern Railroad bypassed Lanier in the mid-1850s. Changed by referendum.	32.293852°N 84.061011°W
Madison; Created 1811	Danielsville	1812		34.124167°N 83.216389°W
Marion; Created 1827	Horry	1828	Renamed Marionville.	
Marion; Created 1827	Tazewell	1838		32.380462°N 84.440770°W
Marion; Created 1827	Buena Vista	1850	More centrally located as the county got smaller.	32.318333°N 84.516111°W
McDuffie; Created 1870	Thomson	1870		33.467222°N 82.499444°W
McIntosh; Created 1793	Darien	1793		31.371111°N 81.430833°W
Meriwether; Created 1827	Greenville	1828		33.027778°N 84.713611°W
Miller; Created 1856	Colquitt	1856		31.173056°N 84.728611°W
Milton; Created 1857; Merged with Fulton in 1932	Alpharetta	1858		34.073333°N 84.281111°W
Mitchell; Created 1857	Camilla	1858		31.230278°N 84.209167°W
Monroe; Created 1821	Johnstonville	1821		33.089082°N 84.074286°W
Monroe; Created 1821	Forsyth	1823		33.034563°N 83.938951°W
Montgomery; Created 1793	the plantation of Arthur Lott	1797		
Montgomery; Created 1793	Mount Vernon	1813	Significant county line changes after the creation of Emanuel County in 1812 put the old county seat within Emanuel County.	32.181389°N 82.593889°W
Morgan; Created 1807	Madison	1808		33.595640°N 83.468006°W
Murray; Created 1832	Spring Place	1834		34.758303°N 84.820590°W
Murray; Created 1832	Chatsworth	1913	Established on the route of the Louisville and Nashville Railroad in 1905. Changed by referendum.	34.766764°N 84.770066°W
Muscogee; Created 1826	Columbus	1828		32.492222°N 84.940278°W
Newton; Created 1821	Covington	1822		33.596533°N 83.859925°W
Oconee; Created 1875	Watkinsville	1875	Formerly the county seat of Clarke County.	33.862778°N 83.408056°W
Oglethorpe; Created 1793	Woodstock	1790s		33.727254°N 82.991239°W
Oglethorpe; Created 1793	Lexington	1806		33.870278°N 83.110833°W
Paulding; Created 1832	Van Wert	1838		33.987222°N 85.043333°W
Paulding; Created 1832	Dallas	1852	Van Wert was in the portion of Paulding County used to create Polk County in 1851.	33.918611°N 84.840833°W
Peach; Created 1924	Fort Valley	1924		32.553396°N 83.888105°W
Pickens; Created 1853	Jasper	1857		34.469167°N 84.434167°W
Pierce; Created 1857	Blackshear	1858		31.298889°N 82.247778°W
Pike; Created 1822	Newnan	1823		
Pike; Created 1822	Zebulon	1825		33.098889°N 84.342222°W
Polk; Created 1851	Cedartown	1854		34.015278°N 85.253889°W
Pulaski; Created 1808	Hartford	1809		32.285833°N 83.449167°W
Pulaski; Created 1808	Hawkinsville	1836		32.283611°N 83.476667°W
Putnam; Created 1807	Eatonton	1808		33.326389°N 83.387778°W
Quitman; Created 1858	Georgetown	1859		31.884737°N 85.108863°W
Rabun; Created 1819	Clayton	1821		34.877778°N 83.401667°W
Randolph; Created 1828	Lumpkin	1830	Three weeks later became county seat of Stewart County.	32.049722°N 84.795833°W
Randolph; Created 1828	Cuthbert	1831		31.770833°N 84.793611°W
Richmond; Created 1777	Augusta	1777		33.466667°N 81.966667°W
Rockdale; Created 1870	Conyers	1870		33.667579°N 84.017642°W
Schley; Created 1857	Ellaville	1857	Former county seat of Lee County.	32.230740°N 84.308673°W
Screven; Created 1828	Jacksonborough	1793		32.8227°N 81.6228°W
Screven; Created 1828	Sylvania	1847		32.7507°N 81.6369°W
Seminole; Created 1920	Donalsonville	1920		31.040833°N 84.878333°W
Spalding; Created 1851	Griffin	1851		33.2475°N 84.270833°W
Stephens; Created 1905	Toccoa	1905		34.577213°N 83.333047°W
Stewart; Created 1830	Lumpkin	1830	Former county seat of Randolph County.	32.049722°N 84.795833°W
Sumter; Created 1831	Americus	1832		32.075278°N 84.226667°W
Talbot; Created 1827	Talbotton	1828		32.678056°N 84.539722°W
Taliaferro; Created 1825	Crawfordville	1826		33.554722°N 82.898333°W
Tattnall; Created 1801	Drake's Ferry	1801		
Tattnall; Created 1801	Ohoopee Mills	1808		
Tattnall; Created 1801	Reidsville	1832		32.083889°N 82.120833°W
Taylor; Created 1852	Butler	1853		32.557153°N 84.237323°W
Telfair; Created 1808	Jacksonville	1810		31.813333°N 82.975278°W
Telfair; Created 1808	McRae	1871	Established in 1871 as Station Number 11 on the Macon and Brunswick Railroad.	32.064444°N 82.898333°W
Telfair; Created 1808	McRae–Helena	2015	Established in 2015 after the separate cities of McRae and Helena merged.	32.069444°N 82.902778°W
Terrell; Created 1856	Dawson	1856		31.773889°N 84.440833°W
Thomas; Created 1825	Thomasville	1826		30.836389°N 83.978333°W
Tift; Created 1905	Tifton	1905		31.450405°N 83.508839°W
Toombs; Created 1905	Lyons	1905		32.204167°N 82.322778°W
Towns; Created 1856	Hiawassee	1856		34.948955°N 83.757534°W
Treutlen; Created 1918	Soperton	1918		32.376111°N 82.592778°W
Troup; Created 1826	LaGrange	1828		33.036667°N 85.031944°W
Turner; Created 1905	Ashburn	1905		31.704444°N 83.653889°W
Twiggs; Created 1809	Marion	1810		32.6623°N 83.4374°W
Twiggs; Created 1809	Jeffersonville	1867	First settled in the 1820s. Changed by a referendum in 1866.	32.683889°N 83.339722°W
Union; Created 1832	Blairsville	1835		34.875556°N 83.956667°W
Upson; Created 1824	Thomaston	1825		32.887579°N 84.326736°W
Walker; Created 1833	LaFayette	1835		34.709722°N 85.283889°W
Walton; Created 1818	Monroe	1821		33.793333°N 83.710833°W
Ware; Created 1824	Waresborough	1824		31.2490°N 82.4744°W
Ware; Created 1824	Waycross	1873	Established as Station Number 9 of the Atlantic and Gulf Railroad in the 1850s. Additional railroads soon intersected the location as well. Changed by referendum.	31.213408°N 82.354049°W
Warren; Created 1793	Warrenton	1797		33.4075°N 82.662778°W
Washington; Created 1784	Warthen	1780s		33.102222°N 82.803611°W
Washington; Created 1784	Sandersville	1796		32.981944°N 82.809722°W
Wayne; Created 1803	Tuckersville	1814	Acting county seat located near the ford of Buffalo Swamp	
Wayne; Created 1803	Waynesville	1829	First county seat in Wayne County created by the Georgia General Assembly.	31.229444°N 81.789167°W
Wayne; Created 1803	Tuckersville	1847	Not effective until after 1848	
Wayne; Created 1803	Waynesville	1856	Selected by popular vote	31.229444°N 81.789167°W
Wayne; Created 1803	Jesup	1873	Established as a depot at the junction of Macon and Brunswick and Atlantic and Gulf railroads in 1856.	31.607136°N 81.885324°W
Webster; Created 1853	McIntosh	185?		
Webster; Created 1853	Preston	1856		31.213408°N 84.538333°W
Wheeler; Created 1912	Alamo	1912		32.148333°N 82.778611°W
White; Created 1857	Cleveland	1857		34.596389°N 83.763889°W
Whitfield; Created 1851	Dalton	1851		34.771111°N 84.971667°W
Wilcox; Created 1857	Abbeville	1858		31.991667°N 83.3075°W
Wilkes; Created 1777	Washington	1784		33.735278°N 82.741389°W
Wilkinson; Created 1803	Irwinton	1811		32.811944°N 83.176667°W
Worth; Created 1853	San Barnard	1853		31.5737°N 83.8673°W
Worth; Created 1853	Isabella	1854		31.5688°N 83.8540°W
Worth; Created 1853	Sylvester	1904	In 1872, the Brunswick and Albany Railroad bypassed Isabella by nearly 3 miles. Changed by referendum.	31.531389°N 83.836111°W

== See also ==
- List of counties in Georgia (U.S. state)
- List of county courthouses in Georgia (U.S. state)
