= Macon and Brunswick Railroad =

19th-century line in Georgia, U.S.

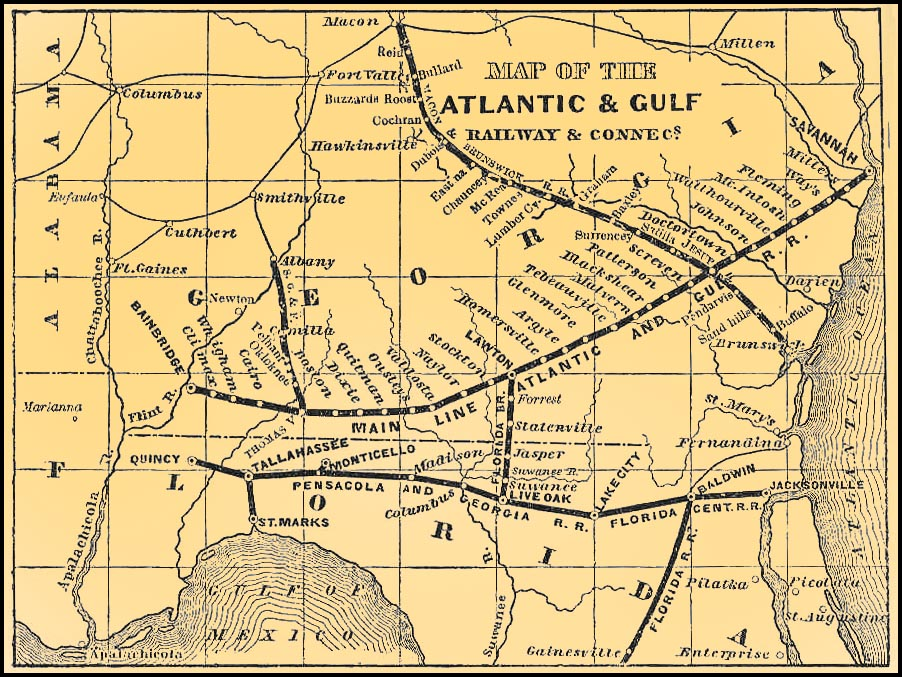
- Macon & Brunswick line crossing Atlantic & Gulf line c. 1870

Overview
- Headquarters: Macon, Georgia
- Reporting mark: M&B
- Locale: United States Wiregrass Region of Georgia
- Dates of operation: 1856–1881
- Successor: East Tennessee, Virginia and Georgia Railway

Technical
- Track gauge: 5 ft (1,524 mm)

The Macon and Brunswick Railroad ran from Macon, Georgia to Brunswick, Georgia. Its construction was interrupted by the American Civil War, and initially only ran from Macon to Cochran, Georgia. The 5 ft (1,524 mm) gauge line was completed and extended to the Georgia coast when it opened in its entirety in December 1869. Construction of the line stimulated the lumber industry along its path, and the founding of new towns and counties.

== History ==
=== Initial construction and completion ===
The Macon and Brunswick Railroad Company was granted a charter by the state of in March 1856. The charter allowed for the construction of a line from Brunswick, Georgia or a point along the Atlantic and Gulf Railroad (1856–79) to Macon, Georgia. Arthur E Cochran was named the president of the company during a meeting of stockholders that same year. Surveying for the line began in early 1857. The initial survey was completed by April 1857 by a E. McNeil. Construction was delayed for several years due to a lack of enough funding.

Slave labor was used for the early grading and track laying. Track building was halted during the American Civil War. By 1863, fifty miles of track had been completed from Macon, Georgia to Dykesboro and an additional branch line from Dykesboro to Hawkinsville, Georgia. In March 1865, the Confederate government ordered the seizure of the rails of the Macon and Brunswick to help with the reconstruction of the Macon and Western Railroad, and the company filed suit against the Confederate government. Regular passenger service resumed in June 1865.

In July 1865, Arthur Cochran died and was soon replaced by George H Hazelhurst, former chief engineer of the company. In January 1867, a new survey for the rest of the line was conducted and it was then planned to cross the Atlantic and Gulf rail line at Screven, Georgia. The venture once again faced funding problems, but investors from New York were able to help with the cost of construction. State-backed bonds also helped the financial problems. Construction began from Brunswick to reach the line being simultaneously from Macon in the August 1868. The construction teams consisted primarily of convicts from the convict lease system. In 1869, the company purchased from the city of Macon the old city fairgrounds, which had been used a prisoner of war camp during the American Civil War. As part of the preparation for the completion of the railroad, the company purchased two new locomotives from Hinkley Locomotive Works that were named "Brunswick" and "Macon." This brought their total number of engines at the time to eight. The names of two of the others were "Georgia" and "Corsair."

By September 1869, the line had been completed from Macon to Lumber City, Georgia and the trestle over the Ocmulgee River near Lumber City was nearing completion. The last spike was driven on December 14, 1869 near what has since become Hazlehurst, Georgia. Freight delivery was scheduled to begin the next day. Passenger service began along the line by the middle of January 1870.

=== Financial decline ===
Not long after it was completed, the company fell upon hard times. By 1873, the company was failing to pay interest on company bonds endorsed by the state of Georgia, and a committee of state senators and state representatives were appointed to examine the financial condition of the company. On July 2, 1873, governor James Milton Smith, announced that the state of Georgia had seized the Macon and Brunswick Railroad for failure to pay interest on its bonds. From 1873 to 1881 the state of Georgia owned the company. In 1875, the state of Georgia attempted to sell the railroad, but could not find a buyer. In September 1879, the Georgia General Assembly passed an act authorizing the lease or sale of the railroad. The act also authorized the extension of the line from Brunswick to the Florida line and from Macon to Atlanta.

Two years later in 1881, the East Tennessee, Virginia and Georgia Railway bought the railroad. In 1894, the ETV&G became part of the Southern Railway. Today it is part of the Norfolk Southern Railway's Brunswick District.

== Economic and political effects ==
The construction of the railroad had a great effect upon the political geography of the area of Georgia through which it passed. The coming of railroad helped establish a number of new counties and moved several county seats. It opened up settlement into an interior region of Georgia that had previously been sparsely settled outside of the area immediately along the Ocmulgee River and Altamaha River.

In the History of Dodge County (1932), Mrs. Wilton Philip Cobb wrote about the founding of Eastman, Georgia:

In 1869 the Macon and Brunswick railroad (now the Southern) was built. Towns began to spring up all along the line, and, as this immediate section was so far removed from the county seat, Hawkinsville, it was deemed expedient to create a new county and place the county seat at this point.

During that period of economic expansion, stimulated by the railroad, Ira Roe Foster, former Quartermaster General of Georgia, operated a saw mill in Dodge County. In 1869, Foster built a residence in what would become the city of Eastman. Foster was one of many who came to the area to participate in the sawmill boom. During the boom, it was estimated that, on average, there was one mill every two miles along the railroad. Unlike earlier eras, when timber was transported downstream in large river rafts, saw mills shipped their timber by rail. In his book The New South Comes to Wiregrass Georgia 1860-1910 author Mark V. Wetherington states: "Ira R. Foster shipped lumber to Brunswick, where it was loaded onto timber schooners and transported to international markets like Liverpool, Rio de Janeiro, and Havana." When the city of Eastman was incorporated in 1872, Foster served as its first mayor.

=== New counties ===
- Dodge County on October 26, 1870.
- Jeff Davis County on August 18, 1905.
- Bleckley County in 1912.

=== County seat changes ===
- Telfair County's seat changed from Jacksonville, Georgia to McRae, Georgia in 1871.
- Appling County's seat changed from Holmesville, Georgia to Baxley, Georgia in 1873.
- Wayne County's seat changed from Waynesville, Georgia to Jesup, Georgia at the junction of Macon and Brunswick and Atlantic and Gulf railroads in early 1873.

=== City name changes ===
- Dykesboro was renamed Cochran, Georgia for the former company president Arthur Emmett Cochran in 1869.

== Listing of stations ==
Original Station No.	Opening Date	Notes	Image	Location	Coordinates
=== Macon and Brunswick Railroad: Main Line ===
Station No. 0	August 1868			Brunswick	
Station No. 1	November 1868			Sterling	
Station No. 2				Buffalo	
Station No. 3				Pendarvis	
Station No. 4	5 July 1869	Junction with the Atlantic and Gulf Railroad		Jesup	
Station No. 5				Satilla	
Station No. 6				Surrency	
Station No. 7				Baxley	
Station No. 8				Graham	
Station No. 8 ½	14 December 1869			Hazlehurst	
Station No. 9	23 September 1869			Lumber City	
Station No. 10				Towns	
Station No. 11				McRae	
Station No. 12				Chauncey	
Station No. 13				Eastman	
Station No. 14	Spring 1869			Dubois	
Station No. 15	1863	Junction with branch line to Hawkinsville		Cochran	
Station No. 16	June 1861			Buzzard Roost	
Station No. 17				Bullard	
Station No. 18				Reid	
Station No. 18 ½	1860			Macon	
=== Macon and Brunswick Railroad: Hawkinsville Branch ===
Station No. 15	1863	Junction with Main Line		Cochran	
	1863			Hawkinsville	

== Company presidents ==
- Arthur Emmett Cochran (1856-1865)
- George Hall Hazlehurst (1865-1873)

George Hall Hazlehurst was appointed agent of the state of Georgia to control the property of the Macon and Brunswick Railroad after it had been seized by the state in July 1873.
