= Atlantic and Gulf Railroad (1856–1879) =

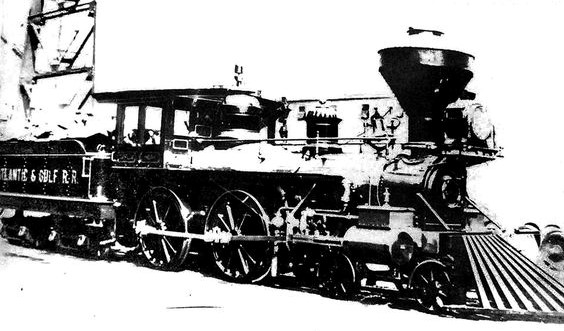
- Satilla 3, the first locomotive to arrive in Valdosta, late 19th century

Overview
- Headquarters: Savannah, Georgia
- Reporting mark: A&G
- Locale: Wiregrass Region of Georgia, United States
- Dates of operation: 1856–1879
- Successor: Plant System

Technical
- Track gauge: 5 ft (1,524 mm)

The Atlantic and Gulf Railroad was chartered in February 1856 by act of the Georgia General Assembly. It was also known as the Main Trunk Railroad. It traversed south Georgia from Screven to Bainbridge, Georgia. Construction began in early January 1859. Its construction was halted by the American Civil War. Construction began again after the end of the war and the line was completed to Bainbridge by late December 1867. The route never reached all the way to the Gulf of Mexico as it had originally intended. The company went bankrupt in 1877 and was bought in 1879 by Henry B. Plant and became incorporated into his Plant System. Its main line is currently operated by CSX Transportation. Throughout its history, the Atlantic and Gulf was closely associated with the Savannah and Albany Railroad Company and its successor the Savannah, Albany, and Gulf Railroad.

== History ==
=== Brunswick versus Savannah ===
In the 1830s, a railroad route through south Georgia to the Atlantic coast was the goal of several different competing companies. The route was desired due to the growth of cotton production in the area and the lack of navigable rivers through the area. The head of navigation on the Flint River was at Albany, Georgia, the center of cotton trade in the region; however, the Flint River was relatively small and Apalachicola Bay lacked a decent harbor. There were two major ports on Georgia's Atlantic coast at the time: Brunswick and Savannah.

The Brunswick and Florida Railroad Company received its charter from the Georgia General Assembly on December 22, 1835. Their charter allowed them to select a route between Brunswick, Georgia and Florida, and forbade another route from existing with 20 miles (32 km) of their own. On that same day, the Great Western Railroad Company received their charter. Theirs allowed for a route from Macon to the start of the Altamaha River on either side of the Ocmulgee River with the option of extending the line to Brunswick and to the Flint River. The latter soon faded into obscurity. By 1836, the Brunswick and Florida Railroad Company was advertising their desire for a route from Brunswick to Apalachicola. The Brunswick and Florida faced major setbacks due to funding problems.

On December 25, 1847, the Savannah and Albany Railroad Company was chartered by the Georgia General Assembly to construct a rail line from a point along the Central of Georgia Railway near Savannah to Albany with the possibility of extending the railroad to the Chattahoochee River at any time. The bill was introduced by Nelson Tift. By 1853, some in the company were discussing a branch line to Florida. In February 1854, the stock company rebranded themselves the Savannah, Albany, and Gulf Railroad through a new charter from the state, but had also completed very little of the planned route. They also lacked the legal right to a more southern route that the Brunswick and Florida Railroad had by its charters.

By April 1854, citizens in south Georgia were hoping that the two companies would avoid competition with one another and construct a "main trunk" line together. In November 1855, a bill was introduced to the Georgia General Assembly by Alexander Lawton to give the Savannah, Albany, and Gulf's southern branch line the right to cross the line of the Brunswick and Florida, but it did not pass.

=== Establishment and construction ===
In early 1856, a compromise was reached between the two competing companies and passed by the Georgia General Assembly. They would both build to a certain point in south Georgia, and then a main trunk line was to be built. The company chartered to build that line was incorporated as the Atlantic and Gulf Railroad Company in February 1856. Construction of the Atlantic and Gulf was forbidden until the junction of the Brunswick and Florida Railroad and the Savannah, Albany, and Gulf Railroad. After that junction had been made the line was to start from the intersection of the county lines of Appling, Ware, and Wayne. The borders of those counties have changed substantially since the passage of the act creating the railroad. The act authorized the company to extend the route to the western state line at any point between Fort Gaines, Georgia and the confluence of the Flint and Chattahoochee Rivers with the route chosen to allow for speedy access to the Gulf of Mexico through either Pensacola, Florida or Mobile, Alabama. At that time the Brunswick and Florida had only completed the first 32 miles (51 km) of its line. On March 31, 1856, the board of commissioners for the Atlantic and Gulf met in Milledgeville to plan for the opening of books and the subscription of stocks. By October 22, 1856, the commissioners showed a total of $600,000 in stock raised. On October, the state of Georgia subscribed to a total of $500,000. James Proctor Screven was named as the president of the company in December 1856. He was also the president of the Savannah, Albany, and Gulf Railroad.

Members of the Brunswick and Florida Railroad Company also met in December 1856 to discuss the changes to the charter made by the Georgia legislature. They recommended that their company refuse to junction with or surrender charter privileges to the Atlantic and Gulf Company unless it was beneficial to the development of the city of Brunswick. They also wanted the junction, if it was to take place, to be located east of the Satilla River. The Brunswick and Florida Railroad Company was still busy in April 1857 trying to get the citizen of Lowndes and Berrien counties on their side and claimed that $40,000 in stock had been raised in Lowndes County alone. At that same time, the Savannah Albany, and Gulf Railroad had finished grading the section of their line between the Altamaha River and the Little Satilla River. That section is between modern Doctortown and Screven in Wayne County, Georgia. Portions of the Brunswick and Florida Railroad Company were being openly critical of the route of the Atlantic and Gulf Railroad until its construction was well underway in late 1859. Another line, the Brunswick and Pensacola Railroad was a second projected route that was to link the junction of the Brunswick and Florida Railroad and the Savannah, Albany, and Gulf Railroad at what is now Glenmore, Georgia to the Atlantic and Gulf Railroad at Thomasville, Georgia. That line was never constructed. The Brunswick faction began focusing on the branch line they had planned to Albany, which would evolve into Brunswick and Albany Railroad by 1861.

The Wiregrass Region that the route of the Atlantic and Gulf Railroad was to pass through was sparsely populated. It dominated by large stands of longleaf pines and wetlands, and crossed by several rivers. Most of the work was done by enslaved people.

Three different routes through Lowndes County were surveyed by E.L. Heriot, Chief Engineer for the company: a route through northern Troupville a line through northern Lowndes County, and a line passing through Lowndes County and crossing the Withlacoochee River at Mineral Springs. On June 17, 1858, the company announced it had chosen the southernmost route of the three. In July 1858, a meeting of citizens from Berrien and Lowndes counties expressed their disapproval with the route chosen. They commented that the route chosen was too close to the Florida state line to be beneficial to the citizen of south Georgia and that because of it, the Atlantic and Gulf was in violation of its charter.

Construction of the Atlantic and Gulf Railroad began on January 2, 1859, at the Little Satilla River near modern Screven, Georgia. Construction averaged 1.27 miles (2.04 km) a week. In July 1859, James P. Screven died and was replaced by his son John Screven as president of Atlantic and Gulf. In late 1860, Atlantic and Gulf failed to pay contractors McDowell and Callahan due to state securities stagnating and private investors failing to pay their installments. The contracting firm Callahan & Co. had been hired to construct the 24 miles (39 km) of bridging and grading west of Thomasville.

=== Civil War ===
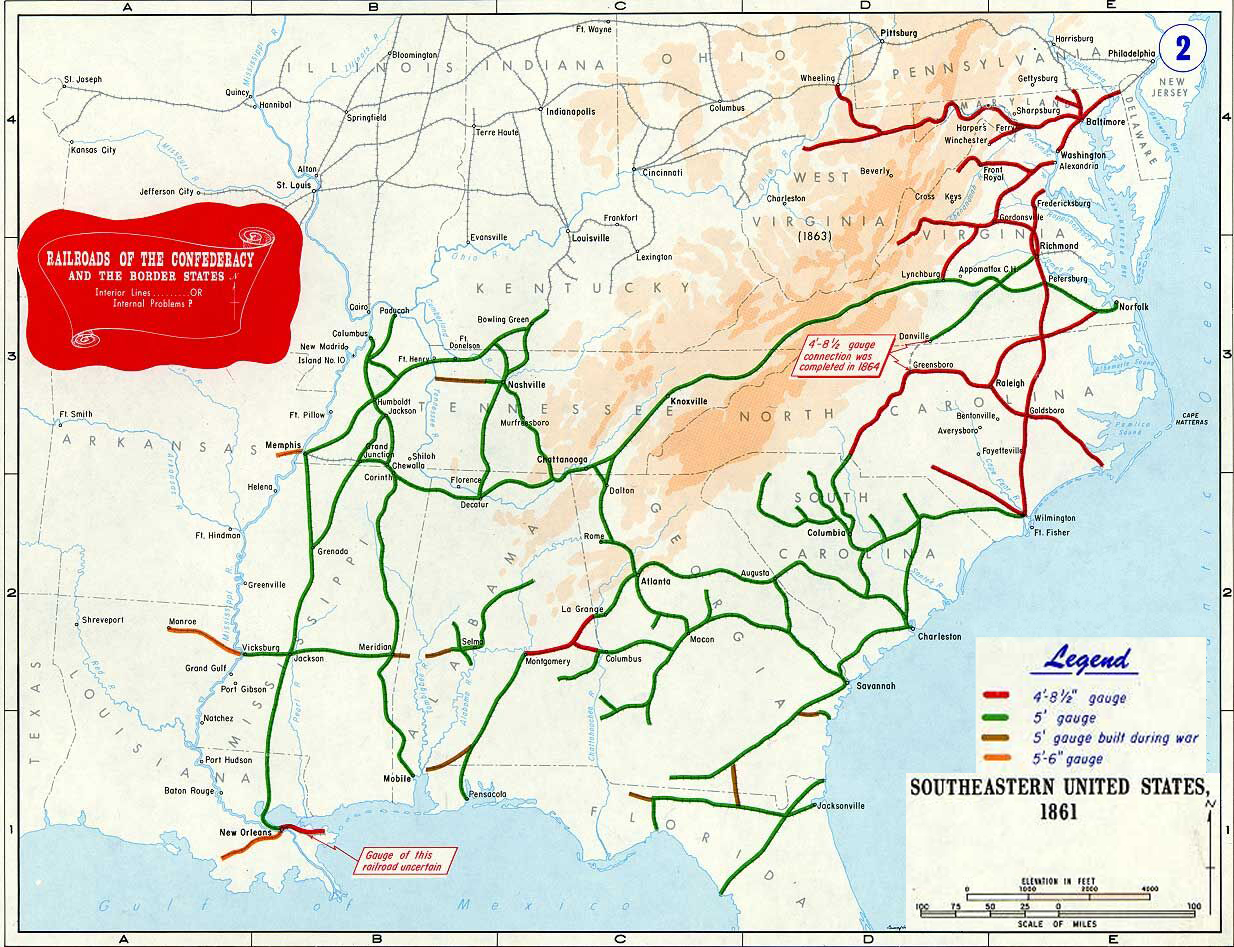
Railroad map of the South during the Civil War

The American Civil War disrupted the construction of the Atlantic and Gulf. By April 1861, the railroad had just reached Thomasville. The original completion date to Bainbridge was supposed to be October 15, 1861.

The line from the initial point in Wayne County to Savannah continued to operate as the Savannah, Albany, and Gulf Railroad until the Georgia General Assembly consolidated that line under Atlantic and Gulf effective on May 1, 1863. The Savannah, Albany, and Gulf Railroad had previously operated under its own name between Savannah and Thomasville. At the start of 1864, workers had graded the main line route to a point within about 5 miles (8.0 km) from Bainbridge. 15 miles (24 km) of the portion west of Thomasville already had crossties on the grade.

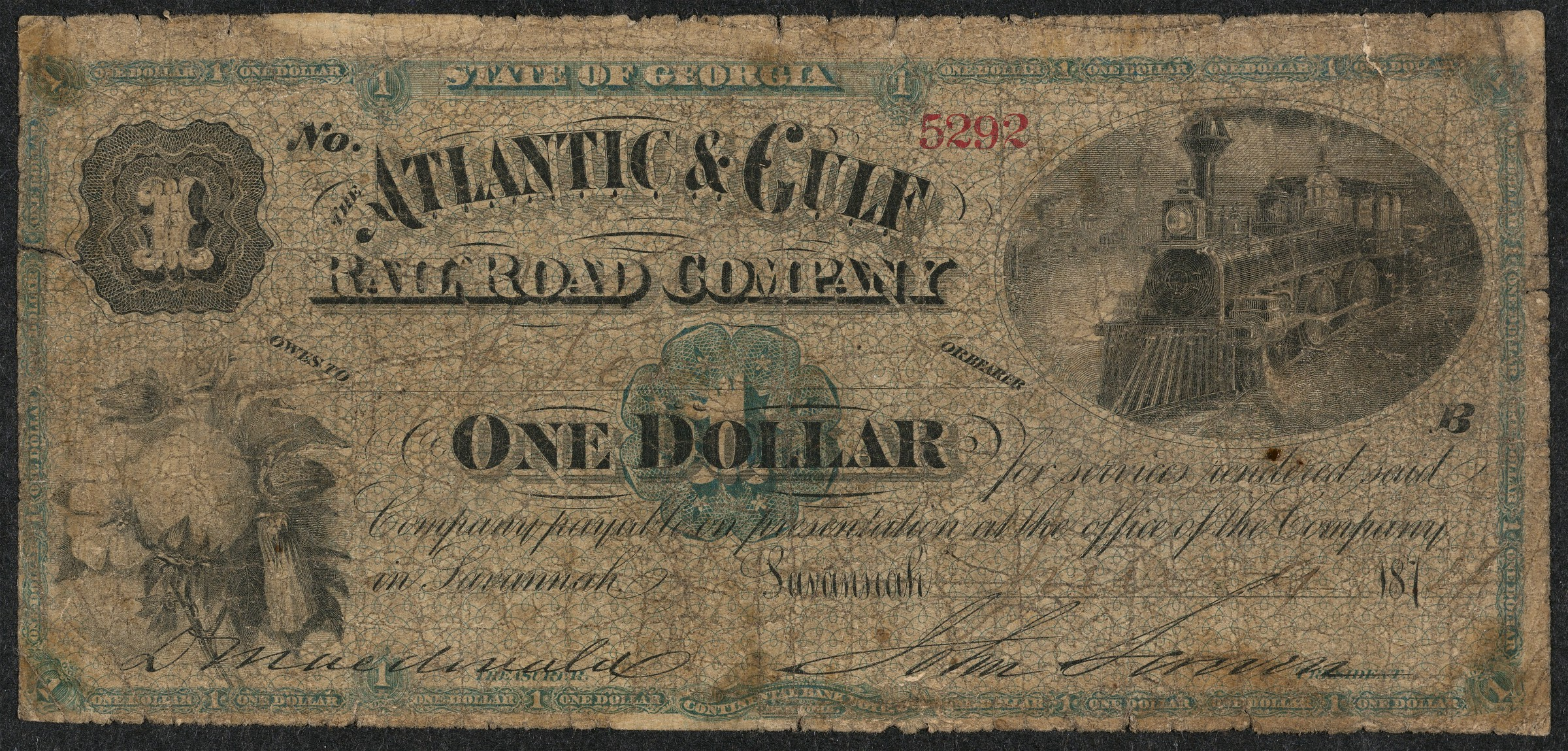
1874 note issued by the Atlantic & Gulf Railroad Company

In April 1861, the Atlantic and Gulf and Florida, Atlantic and Gulf Central Railroad began building a branch line between Lawton, Georgia and Live Oak, Florida, on the Florida, Atlantic and Gulf Central Railroad to enable the movement of troops and supplies between Georgia and Florida. Grading of the route was completed by May 1863. This link was not completed until March 1865, a month before the end of hostilities. It was the first railroad connecting the states of Florida and Georgia. After the war, it was operated by the Atlantic and Gulf as the Florida Division.

Originally the Atlantic and Gulf Railroad Company had two junctions with the Brunswick and Florida Railroad. The first was with the Brunswick and Florida's branch line from what is now Schlatterville to what is now Waycross, Georgia. The Brunswick and Florida's main line's primary junction with the Atlantic and Gulf was at Glenmore, but during the Civil War 60 miles (97 km) of the branch line which had extended all the way to Waresboro, Georgia was taken up by the Confederate government of Georgia to be used in more militarily important regions. After the Civil War, Brunswick and Florida Railroad's line was taken over by the Brunswick and Albany Railroad in 1869. The Schlatterville to Glenmore route was abandoned because of the growth of Waycross.

The Atlantic and Gulf line remained open throughout most of the Civil War. Its remaining open allowed many people from central Georgia and coastal Georgia to take refuge in towns like Thomasville and Valdosta in south Georgia during the Atlanta campaign and Sherman's March to the Sea from Summer to Autumn 1864. On December 19, 1864, the Battle of Altamaha Bridge took place at Atlantic and Gulf's trestle over the Altamaha River near Doctortown. The Confederate victory temporarily kept the only train route from coastal Georgia to south Georgia open.

The railroad sustained some minor damage during the Civil War compared to other railroads in Georgia. An estimated 6.5 miles (10.5 km) of the Atlantic and Gulf's rails were irreparably destroyed, with a total of 25.5 miles (41.0 km) damaged from Georgetown, Chatham County, Georgia to Morgan Lake near the Altamaha River. The trestles across the Ogeechee and the Little Ogeechee rivers were destroyed, but the long trestle across the Altamaha River was undamaged and ready to use by June 1865, when control of the Atlantic and Gulf was restored to its board of directors by General Henry Warner Birge.

=== Financial decline ===
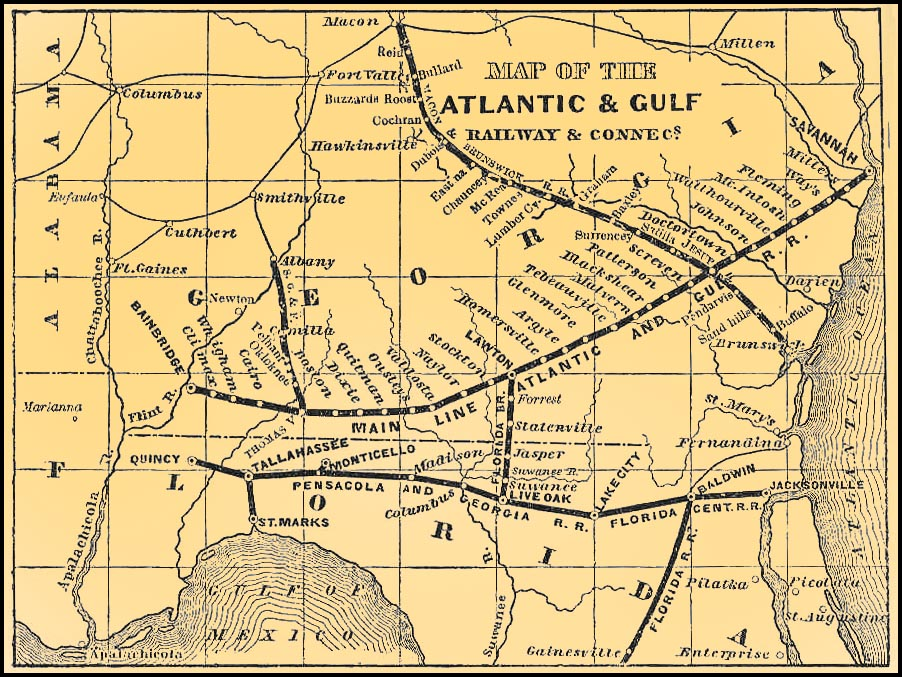
1870 map with connections

By November 1865, the grading of the route to Bainbridge had been completed and the rails were set to be purchased when company finances allowed. By late December 1867, the Atlantic and Gulf's line had been completed to Bainbridge, Georgia.

In 1869, the Atlantic and Gulf purchased the line under construction by the South Georgia and Florida Railroad. It had been chartered by the Georgia General Assembly on December 22, 1857 to construct a railroad between Albany, Georgia and Thomasville, Georgia and from there to the most advantageous point on the Florida line. Only the portion of the line from Pelham, Georgia to Thomasville had been completed by the time of the purchase. The line was completed all the way to Albany within a year. The line was operated by the Atlantic and Gulf as their Albany Division.

In 1871, the Atlantic and Gulf constructed a two-mile extension of its line to the Savannah River.

By January 1872, the Atlantic and Gulf was still trying to expand beyond Bainbridge to the Gulf of Mexico and was still reporting increasing profits. By August, it asked for financial aid from the state of Georgia to help with the completion of the railroad to Pollard, Alabama, but the bill failed to become law in that session or the next. In March 1874, the state of Georgia sold 75% of its shares of stock in Atlantic and Gulf.

On January 1, 1877, Atlantic and Gulf declared bankruptcy after defaulting on several bonds. It had been hard hit by the Long Depression. In November 1879, it was bought by Henry B. Plant at a foreclosure sale and reorganized in December as the Savannah, Florida, and Western Railway, which developed into his Plant System.

== Effect on local geography ==
The construction of the railroad had a profound effect upon the geography of south Georgia. The coming of railroad helped establish a number of new counties and moved several county seats. In general, the Atlantic and Gulf opened up south Georgia to settlement and population growth while also connecting it to areas from which it had previously been isolated. For decades after the railroad's establishment, new towns grew up along its route.

=== New counties ===
- Pierce County on December 18, 1857.
- Brooks County on December 11, 1858.
- Echols County on December 13, 1858.

=== County seat changes ===
- Lowndes County's seat changed from Troupville, Georgia to Valdosta, Georgia on December 7, 1860.
- Clinch County's seat changed from Magnolia, Georgia on December 12, 1860, to Station No. 11, known as Homerville since 1864. .
- Ware County's seat changed from Waresboro, Georgia to Waycross, Georgia in early 1873.
- Wayne County's seat changed from Waynesville, Georgia to Jesup, Georgia at the junction of Macon and Brunswick and Atlantic and Gulf railroads also in early 1873.

== Listing of stations ==
Even though the Atlantic and Gulf Railroad and the Savannah, Albany, and Gulf Railroad were nominally separate entities before they merged in 1863, the Atlantic and Gulf continued with the station numbering system of the Savannah, Albany, and Gulf Railroad. Over time additional stations were created as communities grew up along the route.

Original Station No.	Opening Date	Notes	Image	Location	Coordinates
=== Atlantic and Gulf Railroad: Main Line ===
Station No. 0	September 1856	Successor depot demolished. Original location is now Chatham County DFCS.		Savannah	
Station No. 1				Miller's	
Station No. 1 ½	October 1856			Ways Station	
Station No. 2	December 1856			Fleming	
Station No. 3	March 1857			McIntosh	
Station No. 4		Successor depot still in existence, but was moved in 1980 across the tracks.		Walthourville	
Station No. 4 ½		Successor depot still in existence.		Johnston Station	31.710201°N 81.744761°W
Station No. 5				Doctortown	
Station No. 6		Successor depot still in existence, but in a slightly different location than that of the A&G's.		Jesup	31.605204°N 81.882659°W
Station No. 7	April 1858	Initial starting point of Atlantic and Gulf Railroad.		Screven	
Station No. 7 ½				Patterson	
Station No. 8	May 1, 1859	Successor depot still in existence.		Blackshear	31.302846°N 82.241144°W
				Malvern	
Station No. 9	July 4, 1859	Junction with the branch line of Brunswick and Florida Railroad Company. Successor depot still in existence.		Waycross	31.208908°N 82.359585°W
		A mile away from the Waycross station. Now part of Waycross.		Tebeauville	
Station No. 10	October 12, 1859	Junction with the main line of Brunswick and Florida Railroad Company.		Glenmore	
				Argyl	
Station No. 11	December 21, 1859	Successor depot still in existence.		Homerville	31.036239°N 82.745626°W
Station No. 12	February 28, 1860	Successor depot still in existence, but was moved away from the railroad.		Du Pont	30.988311°N 82.871430°W
Station No. 13	March 23, 1860			Stockton	
Station No. 14	June 18, 1860			Naylor	
Station No. 15	July 4, 1860; July 25, 1860	Successor depot demolished to make room for the James Beck Overpass.		Valdosta	30.830033°N 83.277970°W
				Ousley	
Station No. 16	October 23, 1860	Successor depot demolished.		Quitman	30.779987°N 83.557246°W
Station No. 17				Dixie	
Station No. 18	January 28, 1861	Successor depot still in existence.		Boston	30.793383°N 83.790225°W
Station No. 19	April 16, 1861	Successor depot still in existence.		Thomasville	30.833991°N 83.984007°W
Station No. 20		Successor depot still in existence.		Cairo	30.877139°N 84.208558°W
Station No. 21				Whigham	
Station No. 22	December 1867	Successor depot still in existence, but was moved to a local park in 1980.		Climax	
Station No. 23	December 1867			Bainbridge	
=== Atlantic and Gulf Railroad: Florida Division ===
		Junction with Main Line		Du Pont, Georgia	
				Tarver, Georgia	
				Jasper, Florida	
				Suwannee, Florida	
				Rixford, Florida	
		Junction with Florida, Atlantic and Gulf Central Railroad		Live Oak, Florida	
=== Atlantic and Gulf Railroad: Albany Division ===
		Junction with Main Line		Thomasville	
				Ochlocknee	
				Pelham	
				Camilla	
				Baconton	
				Hardaway	
				Albany	

== Company presidents ==
=== Savannah and Albany Railroad ===
- James Proctor Screven (1852–1854)

=== Savannah, Albany, and Gulf Railroad ===
- James Proctor Screven (1854–1859)
- John Screven (1859–1861)

=== Atlantic and Gulf Railroad ===
- James Proctor Screven (1856–1859)
- John Screven (1859–1861)
- Hiram Robert (1861-1863) acting president
- John Screven (1863–1865)
- William Duncan (1865) acting president
- John Screven (1866–1879)

== Engines ==
Most of the engines used by the Atlantic and Gulf were named after rivers running through its route.

Name	Maker	Commenced running	Configuration	Image	Notes	Final disposition
Tatnall	Baldwin Locomotive Works	September 1856	4-4-0			Condemned January 1864
Altamaha	Rogers Locomotive and Machine Works	January 1857	4-4-0			
Satilla No. 3	Rogers Locomotive and Machine Works	March 1858	4-4-0		Continued running when A&G was reorganized as the Savannah, Florida, and Western Railway. Sold to the McDonough Lumber Co. in 1889. Bought by Henry Ford in 1924.	The Henry Ford Museum
Alapaha	Rogers Locomotive and Machine Works	May 1859	4-4-0			
Ochlockonee	Baldwin Locomotive Works	January 1859	4-4-0			
Withlacoochee	Baldwin Locomotive Works	November 1859	4-4-0			
Okapilco	Rogers Locomotive and Machine Works	November 1859	4-4-0			
Aucilla	Rogers Locomotive and Machine Works	September 1860	4-4-0			
Ogeechee	Baldwin Locomotive Works	September 1860	4-4-0			
Piscola	Baldwin Locomotive Works	September 1860	4-4-0			
Thronateeska	Norris Locomotive Works	December 1860	4-4-0			
Louisiana	Norris Locomotive Works	January 1863	4-4-0		Bought from the Central of Georgia Railway in December 1862.	
Macon	Hinkley Locomotive Works	January 1863	4-4-0		Bought from the Central of Georgia Railway in December 1862.	
Stone Wall	Baldwin Locomotive Works	November 1863	4-6-0		Leased from the Memphis and Charleston Railroad in 1863.	
R.M. Patton	Rogers Locomotive and Machine Works	November 1863	4-4-0		Leased from the Memphis and Charleston Railroad in 1863.	
John Childs	Rogers Locomotive and Machine Works		4-4-0		Bought from the Montgomery and West Point Railroad in 1863.	
Limestone	Rogers Locomotive and Machine Works		4-4-0		Bought from the Montgomery and West Point Railroad in 1863.	
