= Jacksonville, Georgia =

Jacksonville
- City
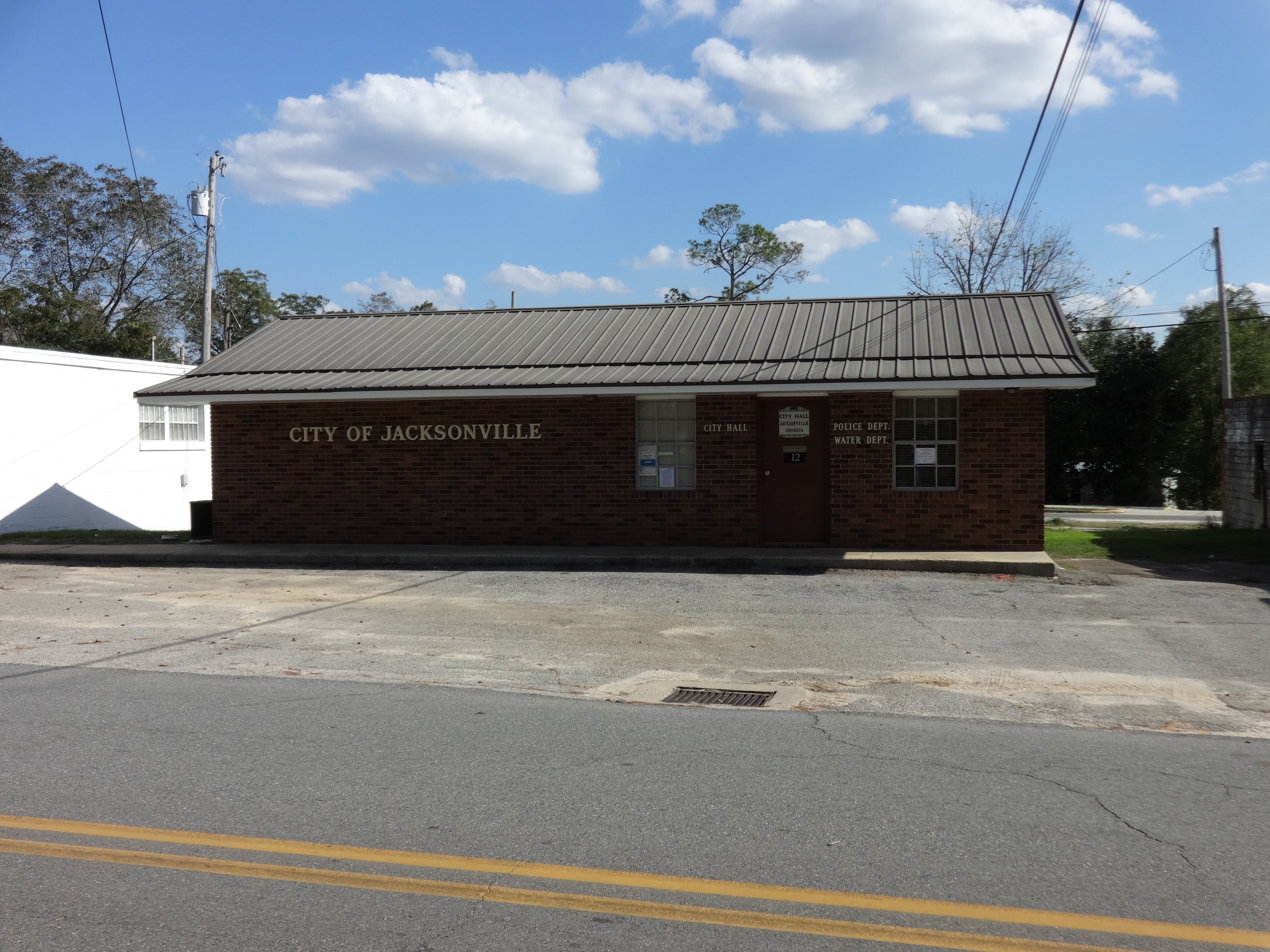
- Jacksonville City Hall, police station

- Location in Telfair County and the state of Georgia
- Coordinates: 31°48′48″N 82°58′31″W
- Country: United States
- State: Georgia
- County: Telfair

Area
  - Total: 1.12 sq mi (2.89 km^{2})
  - Land: 1.08 sq mi (2.81 km^{2})
  - Water: 0.031 sq mi (0.08 km^{2})
- Elevation: 207 ft (63 m)

Population (2020)
  - Total: 111
  - Density: 102.1/sq mi (39.43/km^{2})
- Time zone: UTC-5 (Eastern (EST))
  - Summer (DST): UTC-4 (EDT)
- ZIP code: 31544
- Area code: 229
- FIPS code: 13-41708
- GNIS feature ID: 0316026
- Website: https://www.jacksonvillega.gov/

Jacksonville is a city in Telfair County, Georgia, United States. The population was 111 in 2020.

== History ==
Jacksonville was the original county seat of Telfair County. Land lot 340 in land district 8 was declared to be the permanent county seat in 1814. On November 25, 1815, the Georgia General Assembly declared that the new county seat be named Jacksonville after the hero of the recent Battle of New Orleans, Andrew Jackson. At the time it was located in the center of the county, but when Coffee County was created from the part of Telfair County below the Ocmulgee River in 1854, the town became near the southwestern boundary of the county. In 1856, a referendum was called for the change of the county seat. The results are unknown, but the county seat remained at Jacksonville until after the American Civil War.

In 1871, the seat was transferred from Jacksonville to McRae, which had been established as a station on the Macon and Brunswick Railroad a year before.

The world record largemouth bass was caught near Jacksonville on June 2, 1932, by George Perry.

== Geography ==
Jacksonville is located at 31°48′48″N 82°58′31″W (31.813397, -82.975191).

According to the United States Census Bureau, the town has a total area of 1.1 square miles (2.8 km^{2}), all land.

== Demographics ==
Historical population
Census	Pop.	Note	%±
1850	119		—
1870	40		—
1960	236		—
1970	227		−3.8%
1980	206		−9.3%
1990	128		−37.9%
2000	118		−7.8%
2010	140		18.6%
2020	111		−20.7%
U.S. Decennial Census

As of the census of 2000, there were 118 people, 49 households, and 32 families residing in the town. By 2020, its population was 111.

== See also ==
- List of county seats in Georgia (U.S. state)
