= Gardi, Georgia =

Coordinates: 31°32′18″N 81°47′53″W

Gardi
- Unincorporated community Census-designated place
- Location within Georgia Location within the United States
- Country: United States
- State: Georgia
- County: Wayne

Population (2020)
  - Total: 91
- Time zone: UTC−6 (Central (CST))
  - Summer (DST): UTC−5 (CDT)

Gardi is a small unincorporated community and census-designated place on the outskirts of Jesup, Georgia, in the United States. The community exists primarily along U.S. Route 341.

The 2020 census listed a population of 91.

Some say the community derives its name from the fact one had to guard one's eyes when passing through a nearby swamp, while others believe the name Gardi is derived by shortening and altering the surname Gardner.

== Demographics ==
Historical population
Census	Pop.	Note	%±
2020	91		—
U.S. Decennial Census; 2020

Gardi was first listed as a census designated place in the 2020 U.S. census.

Gardi CDP, Georgia – Racial and ethnic composition Note: the US Census treats Hispanic/Latino as an ethnic category. This table excludes Latinos from the racial categories and assigns them to a separate category. Hispanics/Latinos may be of any race.
Race / Ethnicity (NH = Non-Hispanic)	Pop 2020	% 2020
White alone (NH)	84	92.31%
Black or African American alone (NH)	0	0.00%
Native American or Alaska Native alone (NH)	1	1.10%
Asian alone (NH)	0	0.00%
Pacific Islander alone (NH)	0	0.00%
Some Other Race alone (NH)	0	0.00%
Mixed Race or Multi-Racial (NH)	2	2.20%
Hispanic or Latino (any race)	4	4.40%
Total	91	100.00%

In 2020, it had a population of 91.
