= Du Pont, Georgia =

- Town
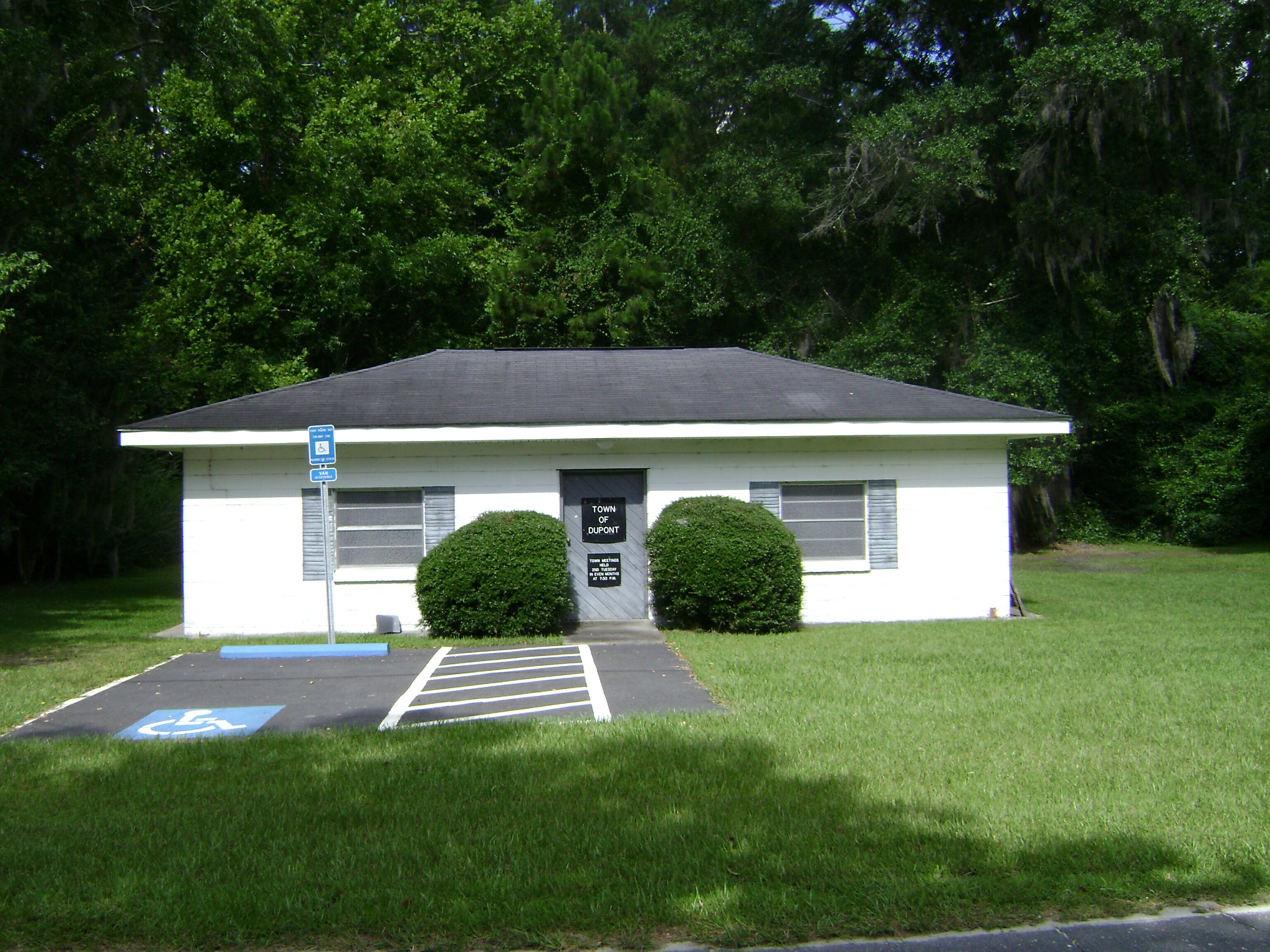
- Du Pont Town Hall

- Location in Clinch County and the state of Georgia
- Coordinates: 30°59.4′N 82°52.3′W
- Country: United States
- State: Georgia
- County: Clinch

Government
  - Type: Mayor-council government
  - Mayor: James Rawls

Area
  - Total: 0.78 sq mi (2.03 km^{2})
  - Land: 0.78 sq mi (2.03 km^{2})
  - Water: 0 sq mi (0.00 km^{2})
- Elevation: 184 ft (56 m)

Population (2020)
  - Total: 134
  - Density: 171/sq mi (66.1/km^{2})
- Time zone: UTC-5 (Eastern (EST))
  - Summer (DST): UTC-4 (EDT)
- ZIP code: 31630
- Area code: 912
- FIPS code: 13-24796
- GNIS feature ID: 0355562

Du Pont is a town in Clinch County, Georgia, United States. The population was 134 in 2020.

According to the 1916 History of Clinch County the town was first settled around 1856 as Lawton, on the route of the newly chartered Atlantic and Gulf Railroad. During the Civil War, a branch line from Lawton to Live Oak, Florida, was built to assist the movement of Confederate troops and supplies, but was not completed until 1865, when the war was nearly over. The town was renamed in 1874 after J. P. A. DuPont, an early settler. It was incorporated as a city in 1889.

== Geography ==
Du Pont is located in northwestern Clinch County at 30°59.4′N 82°52.3′W (30.9896, -82.8707). U.S. Route 84 passes through the center of the town, leading east 8 miles (13 km) to Homerville, the county seat, and west 8 miles (13 km) to Stockton.

According to the United States Census Bureau, Du Pont has a total area of 0.8 square miles (2.1 km^{2}), all of it land.

== Demographics ==
Historical population
Census	Pop.	Note	%±
1910	342		—
1920	381		11.4%
1930	372		−2.4%
1940	332		−10.8%
1950	285		−14.2%
1960	210		−26.3%
1970	252		20.0%
1980	267		6.0%
1990	177		−33.7%
2000	139		−21.5%
2010	120		−13.7%
2020	134		11.7%
U.S. Decennial Census; 1850-1870 1870-1880; 1890-1910 1920-1930; 1940 1950 1960; 1970 1980 1990; 2000 2010

As of the census of 2000, there were 139 people, 57 households, and 42 families residing in the town. By 2010, its population was 120, and at the 2020 census, its population was 134.
