= Ritch–Carter–Martin House =

Historic house in Georgia, United States

- U.S. National Register of Historic Places
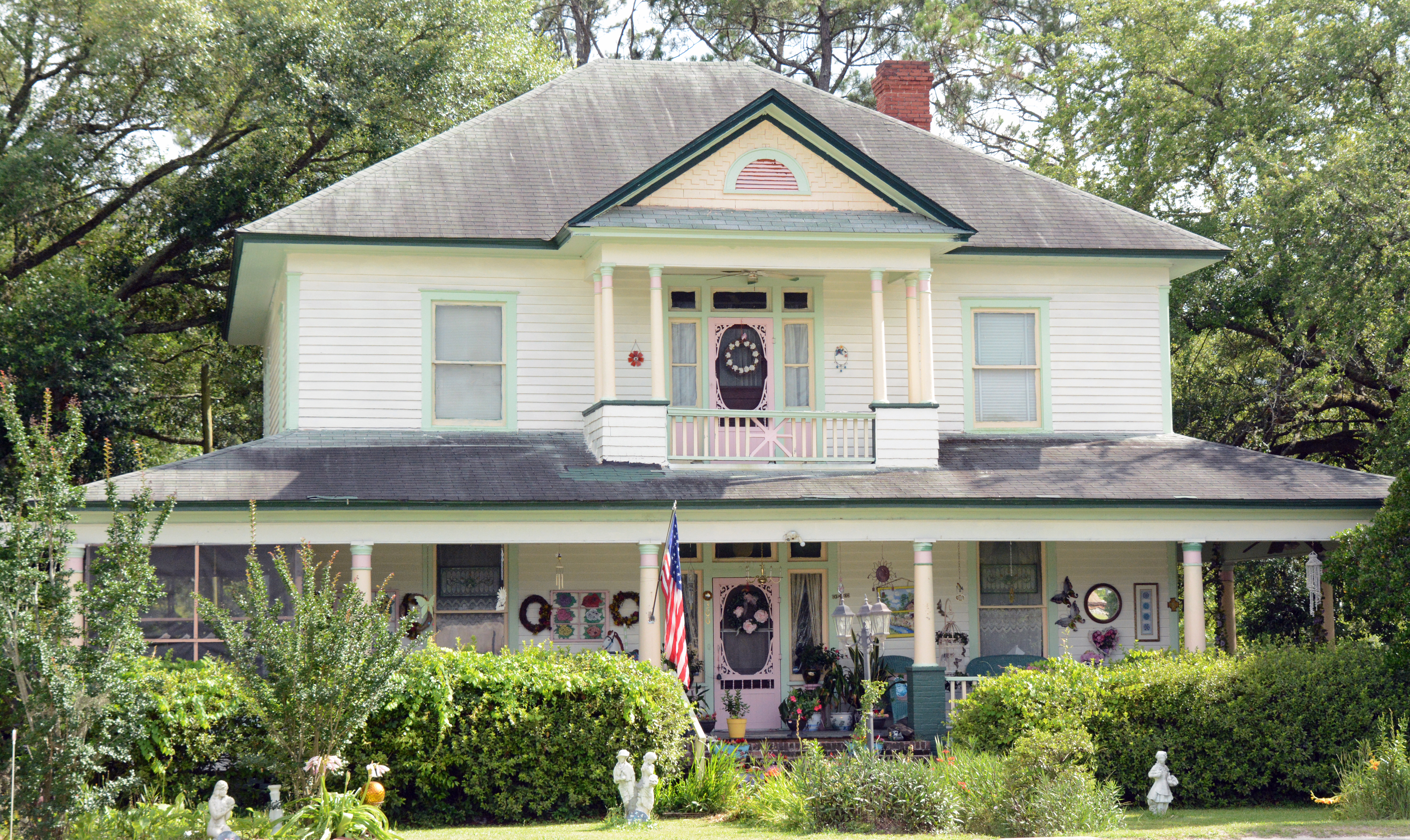
- The house in 2015

- Location within Georgia Location within the United States
- Location: Jct. of U.S. Highway 341 (GA 27), and Tillman St., Odum, Georgia
- Coordinates: 31°39′50″N 82°1′32″W
- Area: 1.8 acres (0.73 ha)
- Built: 1915
- Built by: Paul Edward McCall
- Architectural style: Classical Revival
- NRHP reference No.: 98001484
- Added to NRHP: December 10, 1998

The Ritch–Carter–Martin House in Odum, Georgia, is a two-story wood-framed house that was built in c. 1915 and was listed on the National Register of Historic Places in 1998. The listing included three contributing buildings. It was the last surviving two-story Classical Revival house in Odum.

It was built by carpenter Paul Edward McCall for James Colquitt Ritch (1869–1944), on a corner location. It was later the home of Miss Essie Moody Carter, who by 1988 had lived there for about 65 years.

The house was the location of the telephone exchange for Odum from the mid-1930s to 1965. The exchange was bought by Miss Essie. Miss Essie married Joe Martin, a telephone linesman, in 1937.
