= Leonard Carter House =

Historic house in Georgia, United States

- U.S. National Register of Historic Places
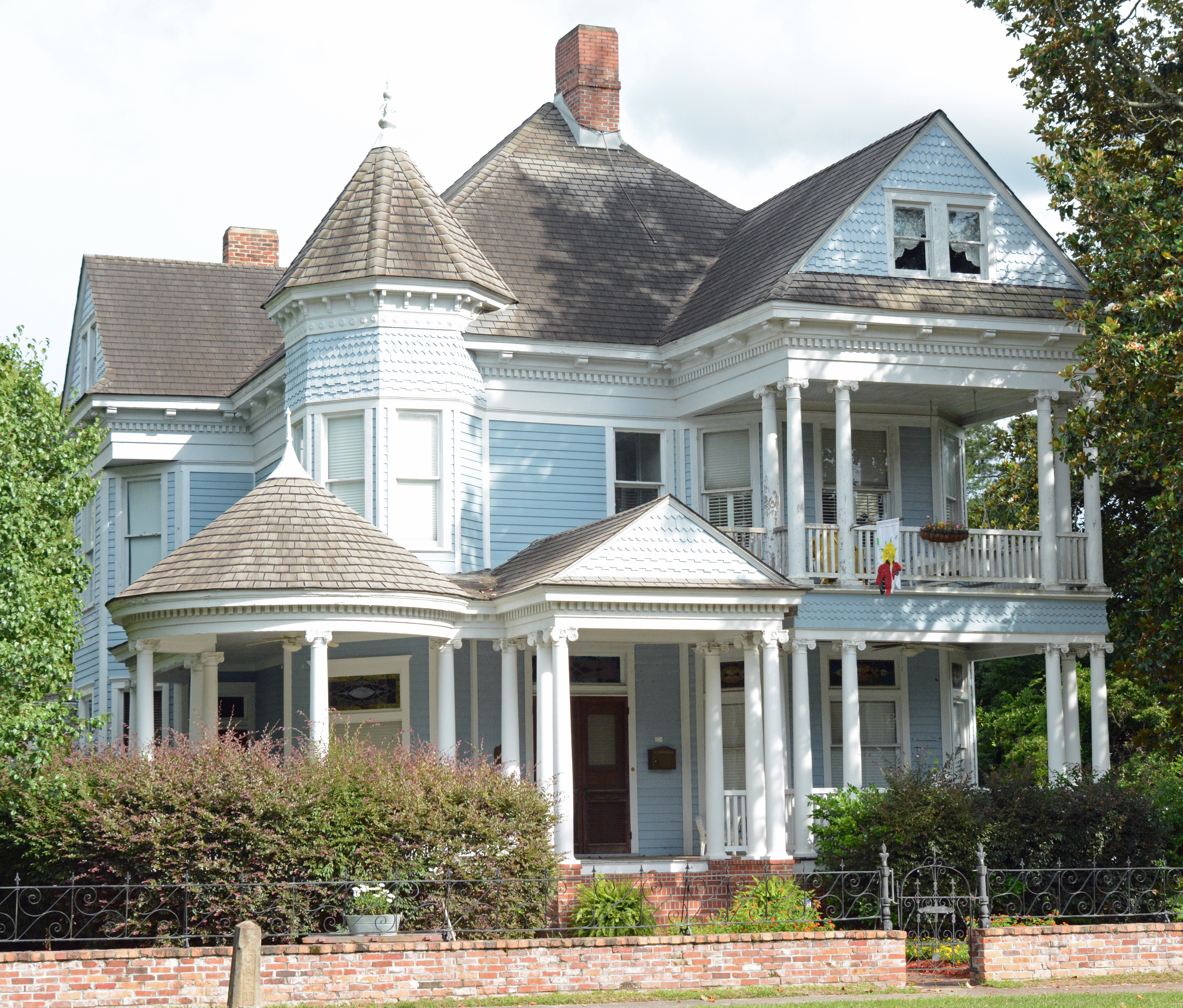

- Location within Georgia
- Location: 311 S. Wayne St., Jesup, Georgia
- Coordinates: 31°36′1″N 81°52′56″W
- Area: less than one acre
- Built: 1902
- Architect: Henry M. Ward
- Architectural style: Queen Anne
- NRHP reference No.: 89001212
- Added to NRHP: August 31, 1989

The Leonard Carter House in Jesup in Wayne County, Georgia is a two-and-a-half-story Queen Anne-style house which was built in 1902. It was listed on the National Register of Historic Places in 1989.

The house was deemed notable as "a fine if late example of the use of the Queen Anne style, mixed with elements of the Neoclassical Revival style", its property was deemed significant also for its landscape architecture "as an example of a picturesquely landscaped yard with trees, shrubbery, and lawn all displayed in an informal manner—typical of late 19th century gardening practices."

The property includes a concrete hitching post labelled "Carter" on one side and a one-story red brick greenhouse.
