= John W. C. Trowell House =

Historic house in Georgia, United States

- U.S. National Register of Historic Places
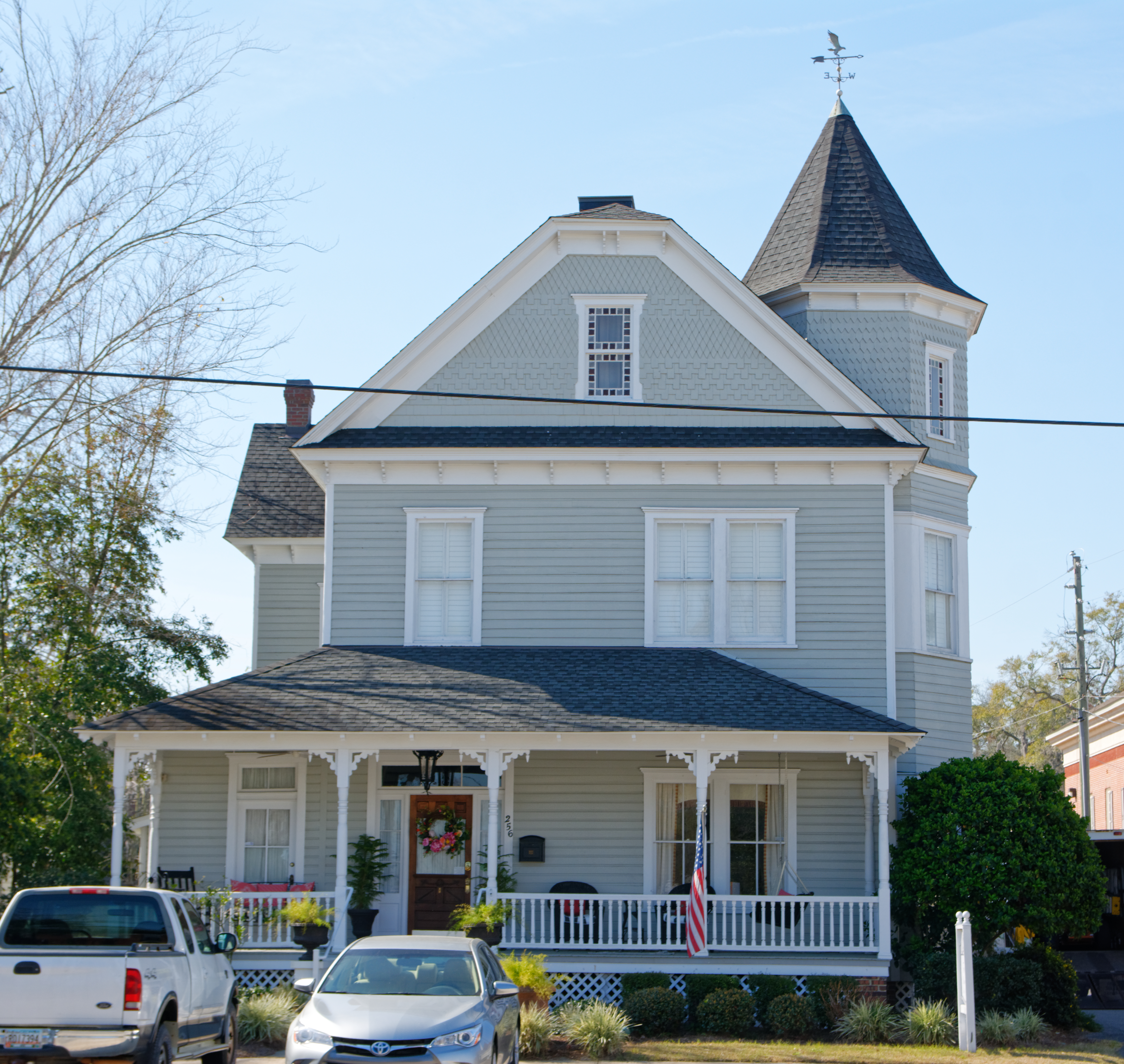

- Location within Georgia
- Location: 256 E. Cherry St., Jesup, Georgia
- Coordinates: 31.6029°N 81.8806°W
- Area: less than one acre
- Built: 1902
- Architectural style: Queen Anne
- NRHP reference No.: 93000944
- Added to NRHP: September 16, 1993

The John W. C. Trowell House in Jesup in Wayne County, Georgia was listed on the National Register of Historic Places in 1993.

It is a Queen Anne-style house built in 1902. It was home of John W. C. Trowell (b.1862 in Screven County, Georgia, d.1939 in this house) and his wife Ella née Butler (c.1865-1951).

It is now the Trowell Historic Inn Bed & Breakfast.
