= C. W. Deen House =

Historic house in Georgia, United States

- U.S. National Register of Historic Places
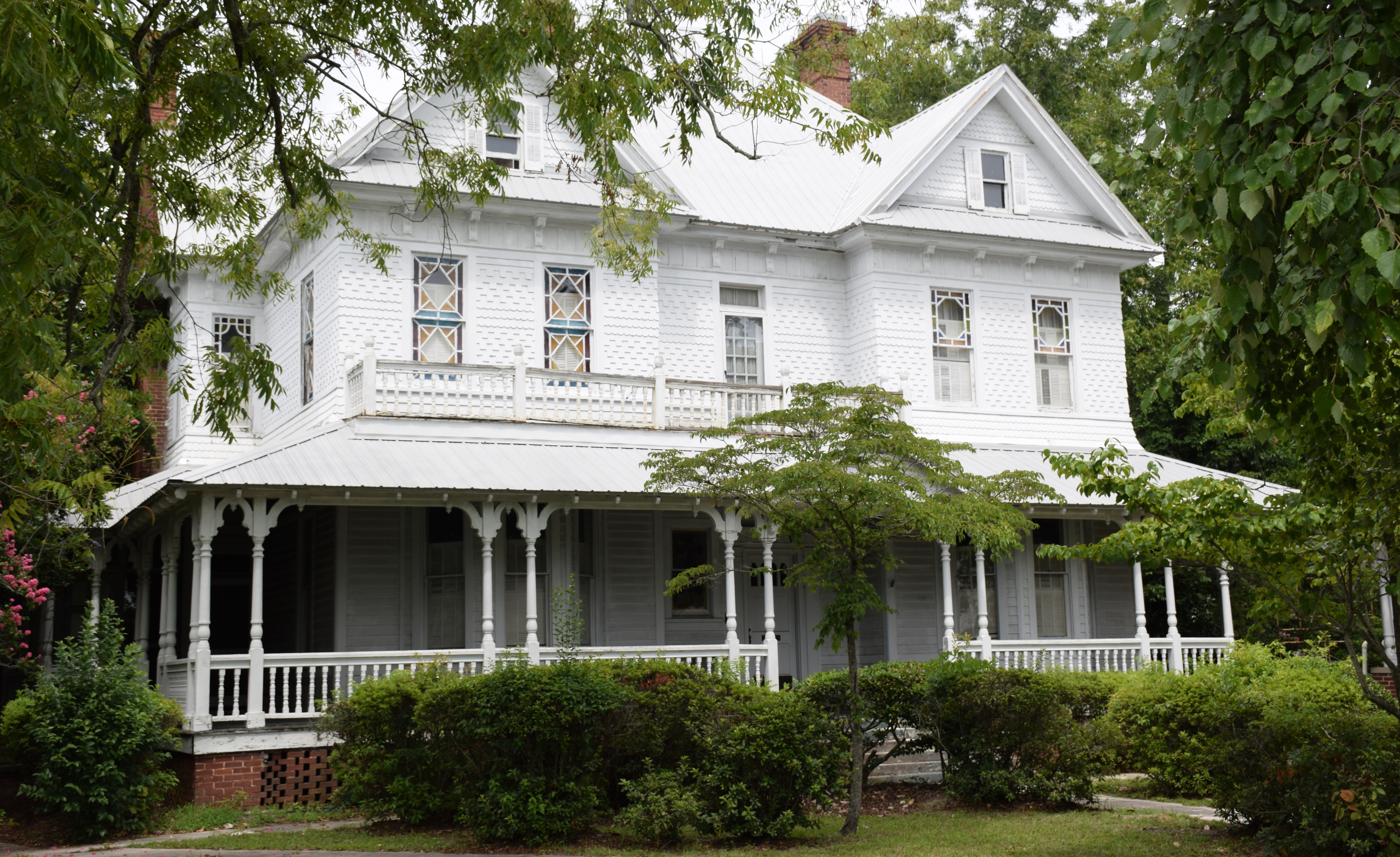

- Location within Georgia Location within the United States
- Location: 413 N. Main St., Baxley, Georgia
- Coordinates: 31°46′50″N 82°20′54″W
- Area: 0.6 acres (0.24 ha)
- Built: 1894–1897
- Built by: Johnson, J.J.
- Architectural style: Late Victorian, Queen Anne
- NRHP reference No.: 82002381
- Added to NRHP: September 30, 1982

The C. W. Deen House, at 413 N. Main St. in Baxley in Appling County, Georgia, was built during 1894–1897. It was listed on the National Register of Historic Places in 1982.

It is a two-and-a-half-story Queen Anne-style house. It has a "four-over-four room with central stairhall plan" plus a one-story ell at the back for a kitchen. It has a wraparound one-story porch on its front, one side, and rear, and a second-story balcony on the front.

Part of its significance is for its association with C.W. Deen, "the leading landowner and businessman in Appling County in the early years of the twentieth century" and "a major naval stores operator at a time when south Georgia led the world as a producer of naval stores". It is also significant as a center of social life in Baxley when W. Hughes Rogers and his wife Carrie Rogers, co-founder of the Baxley Women's Club, lived there.
