= Screven, Georgia =

- City
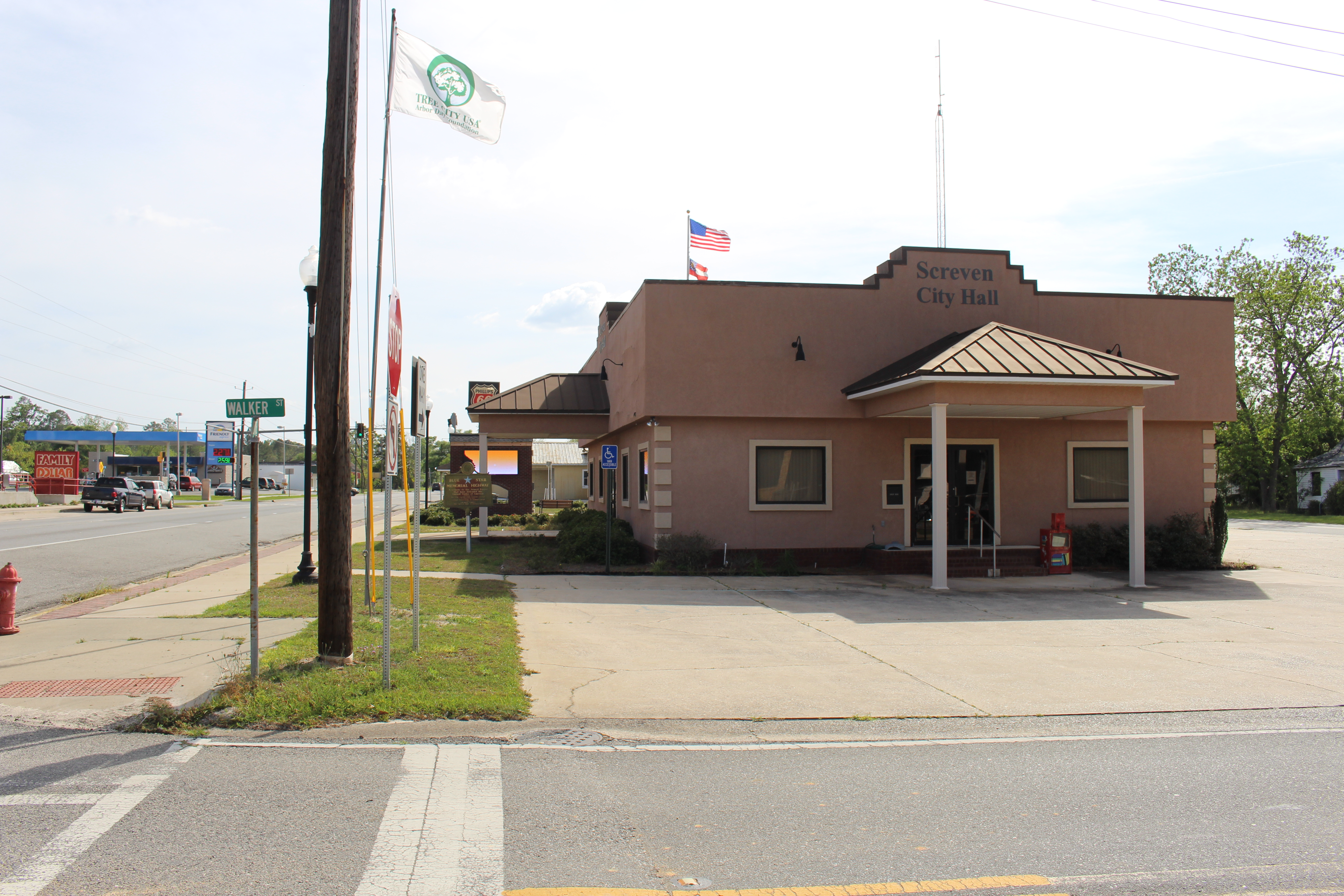
- City hall

- Location in Wayne County and the state of Georgia
- Coordinates: 31°29′6″N 82°0′59″W
- Country: United States
- State: Georgia
- County: Wayne

Government
  - Mayor: Jason Weaver

Area
  - Total: 2.18 sq mi (5.64 km^{2})
  - Land: 2.16 sq mi (5.59 km^{2})
  - Water: 0.023 sq mi (0.06 km^{2})
- Elevation: 121 ft (37 m)

Population (2020)
  - Total: 769
  - Density: 356.6/sq mi (137.67/km^{2})
- Time zone: UTC-5 (Eastern (EST))
  - Summer (DST): UTC-4 (EDT)
- ZIP code: 31560
- Area code: 912
- FIPS code: 13-69448
- GNIS feature ID: 0332994
- Website: www.cityofscreven.com

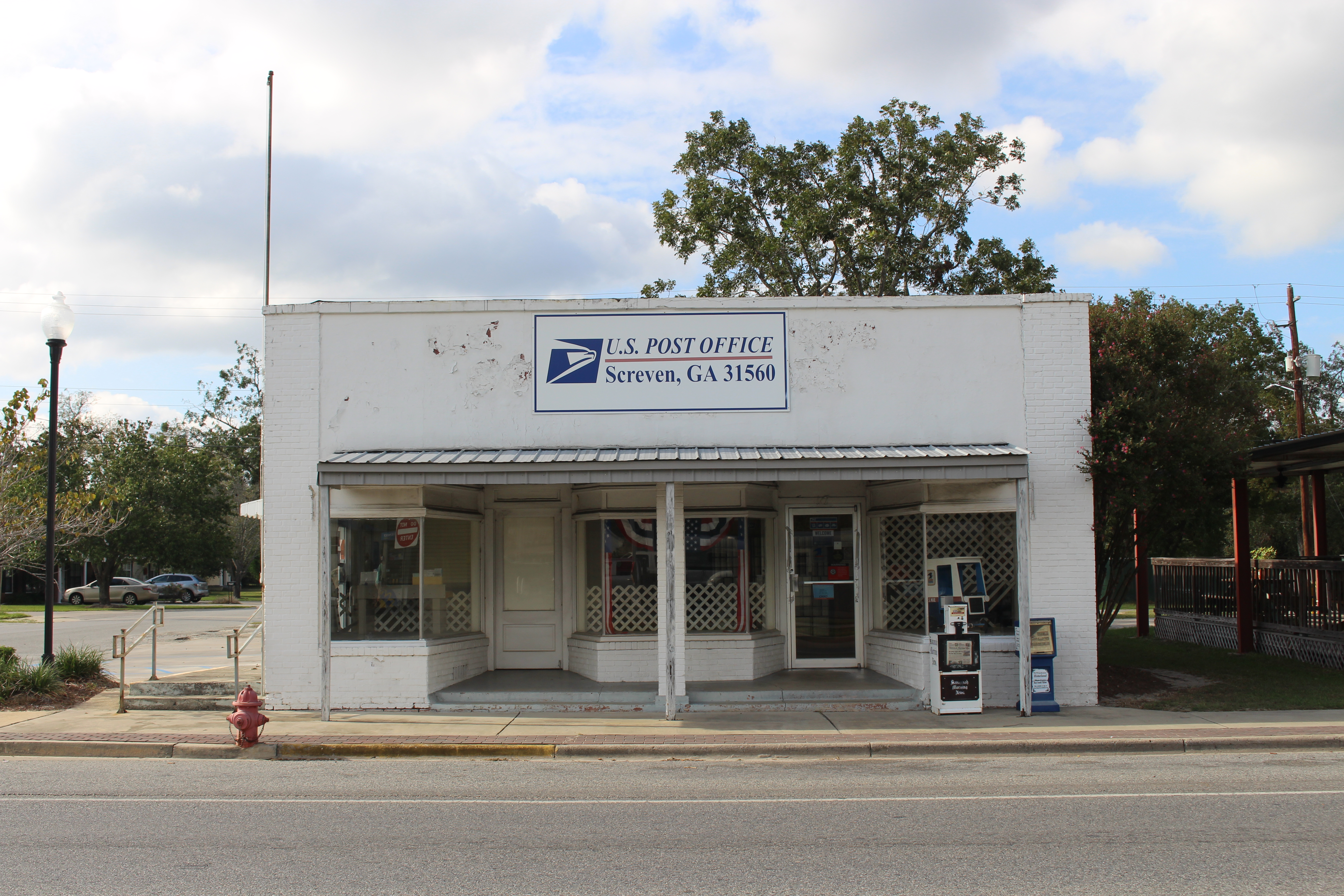
Screven Post Office

Screven (/skrɪvm/) is a city in Wayne County, Georgia, United States. The population was 769 in 2020. Although it was a railroad town as early as 1857, it was not officially chartered until August 19, 1907.

== History ==
The Georgia General Assembly incorporated Screven as a town in 1907.

== Geography ==
Screven is located at 31°29′6″N 82°0′59″W (31.485008, −82.016305).

According to the United States Census Bureau, the city has a total area of 2.2 square miles (5.7 km^{2}), all of it land.

== Demographics ==
Historical population
Census	Pop.	Note	%±
1910	276		—
1920	364		31.9%
1930	505		38.7%
1940	664		31.5%
1950	752		13.3%
1960	1,010		34.3%
1970	936		−7.3%
1980	872		−6.8%
1990	819		−6.1%
2000	702		−14.3%
2010	766		9.1%
2020	769		0.4%
U.S. Decennial Census

As of the census of 2000, there were 702 people, 291 households, and 196 families residing in the city. By the 2020 census, its population was 769.
