= Odum, Georgia =

- Town
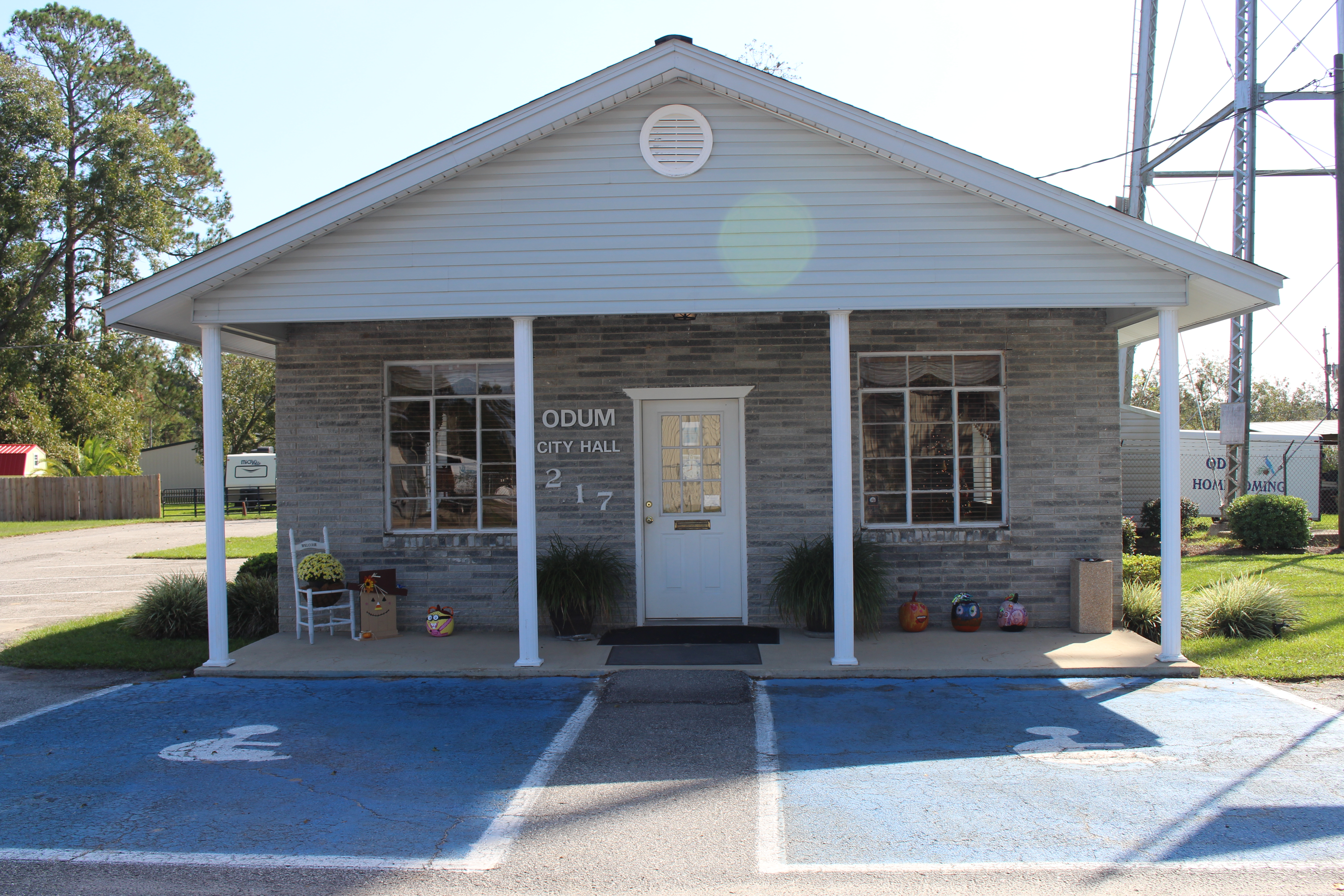
- City hall

- Location in Wayne County and the state of Georgia
- Coordinates: 31°39′58″N 82°1′43″W
- Country: United States
- State: Georgia
- County: Wayne

Area
  - Total: 2.03 sq mi (5.26 km^{2})
  - Land: 2.03 sq mi (5.25 km^{2})
  - Water: 0.0039 sq mi (0.01 km^{2})
- Elevation: 154 ft (47 m)

Population (2020)
  - Total: 463
  - Density: 228.4/sq mi (88.19/km^{2})
- Time zone: UTC-5 (Eastern (EST))
  - Summer (DST): UTC-4 (EDT)
- ZIP code: 31555
- Area code: 912
- FIPS code: 13-57540
- GNIS feature ID: 0319907
- Website: odumgeorgia.com

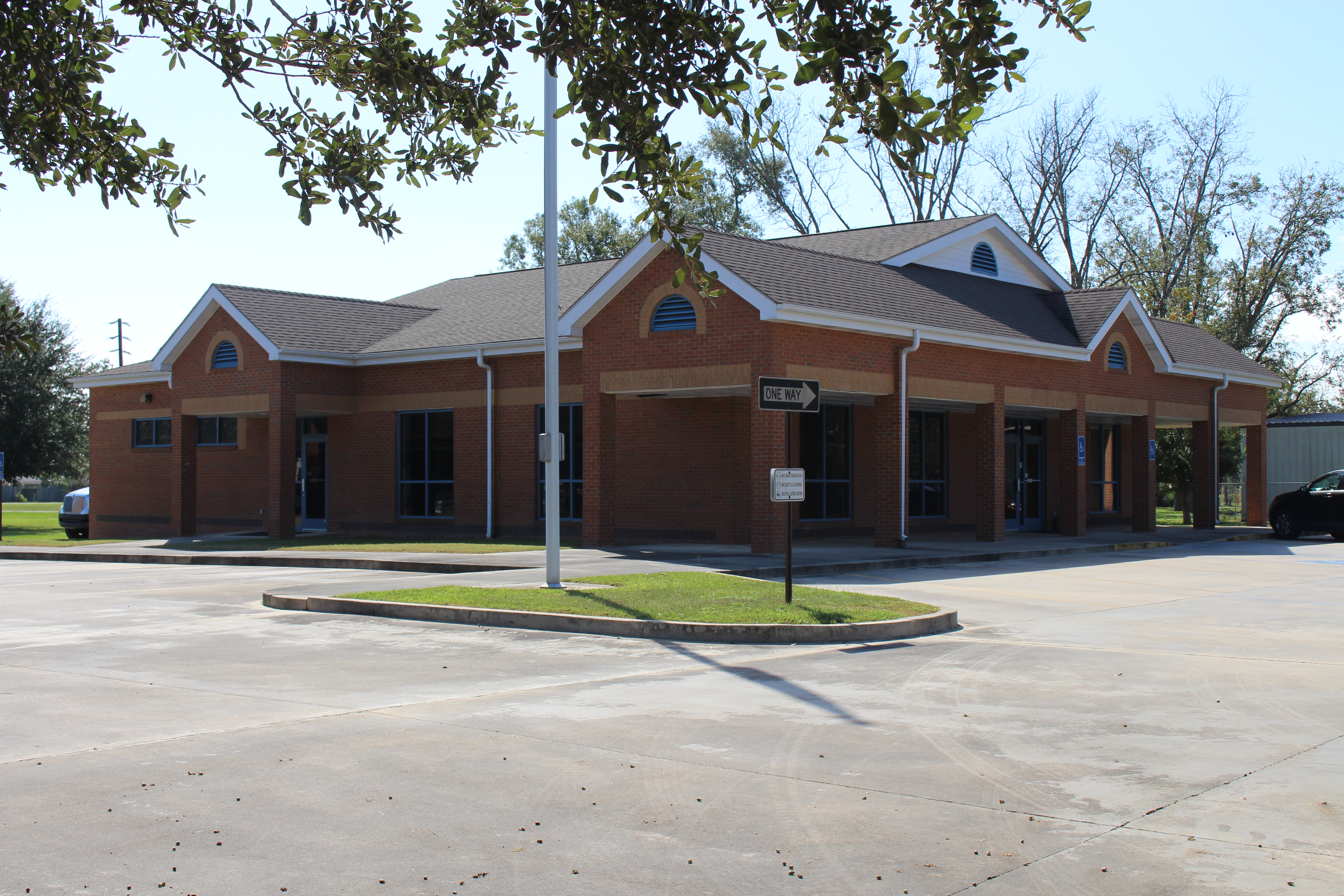
Post office

Odum is a town in Wayne County, Georgia, United States. The population was 463 at the 2020 census.

== History ==
The Georgia General Assembly incorporated Odum as a town in 1907. The community was named after Godfrey Odum, an early settler. The first mayor was Dr. J. T. Colvin. J. A. Odum was an early councilman.

The Ritch–Carter–Martin House in Odum was added to the National Register of Historic Places in 1998.

== Geography ==
Odum is located at 31°39′58″N 82°1′43″W (31.666072, -82.028622).

According to the United States Census Bureau, the town has a total area of 1.9 square miles (4.9 km^{2}), all land.

== Demographics ==
Historical population
Census	Pop.	Note	%±
1910	258		—
1920	309		19.8%
1930	439		42.1%
1940	469		6.8%
1950	389		−17.1%
1960	404		3.9%
1970	379		−6.2%
1980	401		5.8%
1990	388		−3.2%
2000	414		6.7%
2010	504		21.7%
2020	463		−8.1%
U.S. Decennial Census

At the 2000 census, there were 414 people, 163 households and 119 families residing in the town. By the 2020 census, its population had grown to 463.
