= Waynesville, Georgia =

Unincorporated community in Georgia, United States

Waynesville
- Unincorporated community Census-designated place
- Motto: Voted 2022 Best place to live in Georgia Award
- Location within the state of Georgia Waynesville (the United States)
- Coordinates: 31°13′46″N 81°47′21″W
- Country: United States
- State: Georgia
- County: Brantley

Population (2020)
  - Total: 331
- Time zone: UTC-5 (Eastern (EST))
  - Summer (DST): UTC-4 (EDT)
- ZIP codes: 31566

Waynesville is an unincorporated community and census-designated place (CDP) in Brantley County, Georgia, United States. It is part of the Brunswick, Georgia metropolitan statistical area. Its ZIP code is 31566. It was first listed as a CDP in the 2020 census with a population of 331.

== History ==
Waynesville derives its name from Wayne County, of which it once was a part of. Records are contradictory so it is unclear when exactly Waynesville held the county seat.

== Geography ==
Waynesville is located near the old Post Road which is the dividing line between the counties of Brantley and Glynn.

== Demographics ==
Historical population
Census	Pop.	Note	%±
2020	331		—
U.S. Decennial Census; 2020

Waynesville CDP, Georgia – Racial and ethnic composition Note: the US Census treats Hispanic/Latino as an ethnic category. This table excludes Latinos from the racial categories and assigns them to a separate category. Hispanics/Latinos may be of any race.
Race / Ethnicity (NH = Non-Hispanic)	Pop 2020	% 2020
White alone (NH)	288	87.01%
Black or African American alone (NH)	11	3.32%
Native American or Alaska Native alone (NH)	0	0.00%
Asian alone (NH)	3	0.91%
Pacific Islander alone (NH)	0	0.00%
Some Other Race alone (NH)	4	1.21%
Mixed Race or Multi-Racial (NH)	14	4.23%
Hispanic or Latino (any race)	11	3.32%
Total	331	100.00%

At the 2020 census, its population was 331.

== See also ==
List of county seats in Georgia (U.S. state)
