= Wayne County, Georgia =

County in Georgia, United States

- County
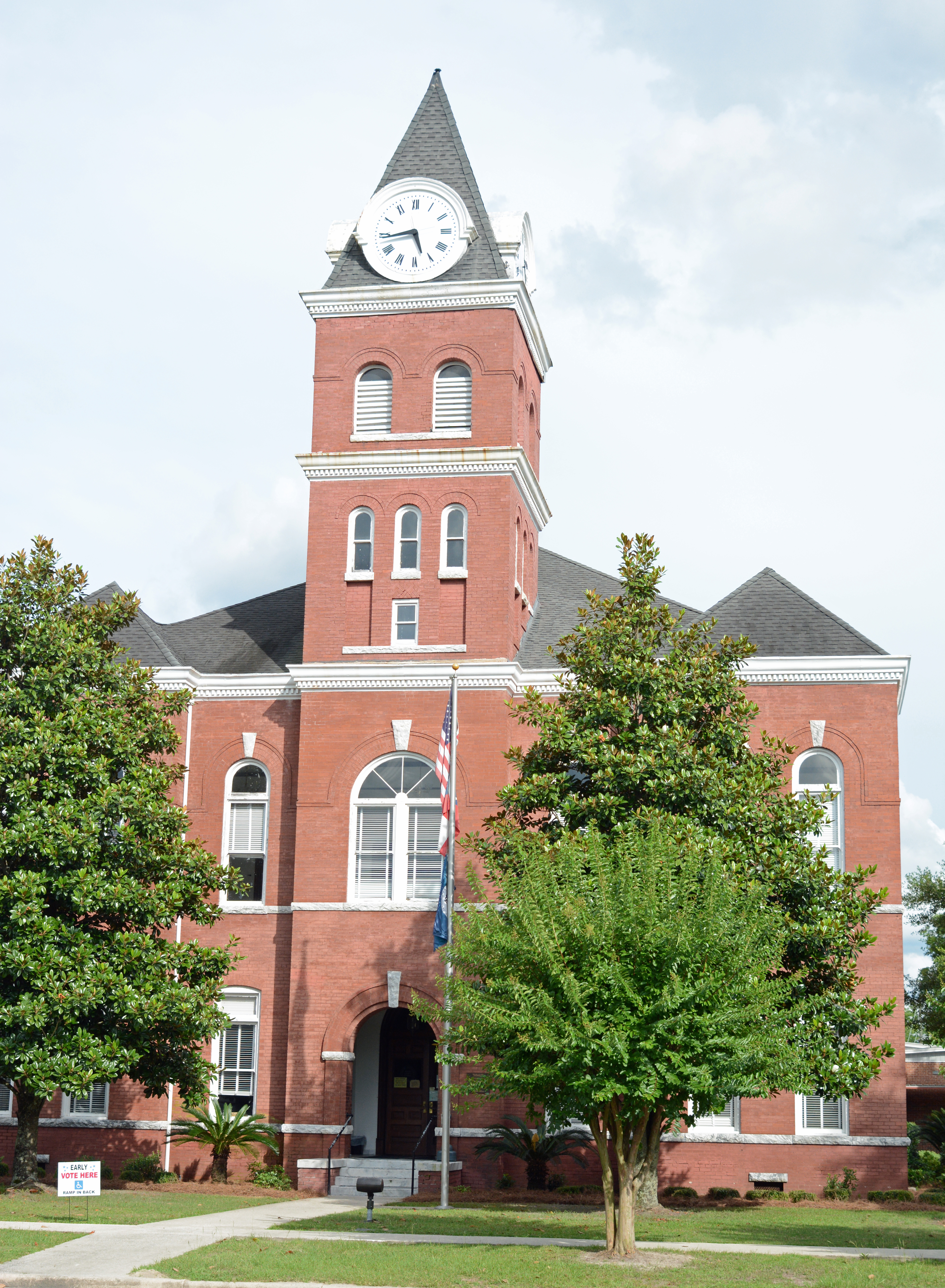
- Wayne County Courthouse in Jesup

- Logo

- Location within the U.S. state of Georgia
- Coordinates: 31°33′N 81°55′W
- Country: United States
- State: Georgia
- Founded: December 7, 1803; 222 years ago
- Named for: Anthony Wayne
- Seat: Jesup
- Largest city: Jesup

Area
  - Total: 649 sq mi (1,680 km^{2})
  - Land: 642 sq mi (1,660 km^{2})
  - Water: 7.0 sq mi (18 km^{2}) 1.1%

Population (2020)
  - Total: 30,144
  - Estimate (2025): 32,481 ▲
  - Density: 47/sq mi (18/km^{2})
- Time zone: UTC−5 (Eastern)
  - Summer (DST): UTC−4 (EDT)
- Congressional district: 1st
- Website: www.waynecountyga.us

Wayne County is a county located in the southeastern part of the U.S. state of Georgia. As of the 2020 census, the population was 30,144. The county seat is Jesup.

Wayne County comprises the Jesup, Georgia micropolitan statistical area.

== History ==
At the time of European contact, the area of what would become Wayne County was settled by the Guale people. Being close to the coast and bordered by the Altamaha River, Wayne County's history includes occupation by Spanish missionaries at the time of the settlement of Saint Augustine as well as short-lived French occupation. The flags of France, Spain, England, and the Confederate States of America all flew over Wayne.

=== Early years ===
Seventy years after General James Oglethorpe settled the colony of Georgia and 27 years after that colony became one of the 13 original states, Wayne County came into being. The county was named for Mad Anthony Wayne whose military career had made him a well-known hero. When he surprised the British garrison at Stony Point on July 15, 1779, he acquired the nickname "Mad" Anthony. From one siege to another, he was a vital member of General George Washington's staff serving well under General Nathanael Greene and coming to Georgia in 1781 in his service during the American Revolution.

It was created by an Act of the Legislature in 1803 after the Wilkinson Treaty was signed with the Creek Indians on January 16, 1802, which ceded part of the Tallassee Country and part of the lands within the forks of the Oconee and Ocmulgee Rivers to the United States. As originally laid out, the new county – the 28th Georgia county – was a long narrow strip of land approximately 100 miles (160 km) in length but with varying measures of width along the way. It was six miles (9.7 km) as it stood just south of the Altamaha River, eight miles (13 km) wide near the Satilla and five miles (8.0 km) wide at a location about 27 miles (43 km) south of the Altamaha. All counties organized prior to 1802 were headright counties – no surveys were ever made of those counties. It was found that under the headright system more land was given away than actually existed and this was the case for Wayne County. Although created in 1803, no valid lottery was done for the county until the Land Lottery Act of 1805. The 1805 Act divided the half million acres (2,000 km^{2}) of Wayne County, formed the Tallassee Strip, and set the stage for the land lottery that would result in more formal settlement of the area. It is the second date, December 7, 1805, that the county chose to observe as the creation date. The area was not a popular one for lottery draws as the straws were drawn sight unseen and the winner was as likely to draw swampland as he was prime agricultural lots.

=== The fight for the county seat ===
The county was slow in developing and those in the area were in no hurry to be concerned with matters governmental. On December 8, 1806, the Georgia General Assembly created appointed five commissioners to establish a permanent site for a county seat and called for county court to be held at the home of one those commissioners, Roberta Smallwood, until a permanent site could be established. In December 1808, the General Assembly called for a new set of commissioners to select a county seat, as the site picked by the previous set had picked a site near the upper corner of the county and was not centrally located. Court was to be held at the house of a Captain William Clements until a site was selected.

In December 1823, the General Assembly appointed another board of commissioners to establish a county seat.

The first post office in Wayne County was established at Tuckersville, sometimes seen as Tuckerville, on January 29, 1814. Tuckersville acted as the county seat until Waynesville was so designated. John Tucker was the first postmaster and his service was followed by William A. Knight and Robert Stafford Jr. before the mail service was discontinued in 1827. Tuckersville disappears from most maps by 1850. Its exact location remains a mystery although it is known it was 9 miles north of Waynesville on the Post Road near the ford of Buffalo Swamp. The intersection of Mount Pleasant Road and 10 Mile Road is a possible location.

It was not until December 1829, that legislative action created a county seat. Wayne County's first official county seat was Waynesville, Georgia then considered to be a central location in the long and narrow county for settlers to travel for court and other primary government functions. Waynesville was the site of Wayne County's first school, which was called Mineral Springs Academy. It was named for the famous mineral springs which were a short distance east of the residential section of the town.

In December 1832, a petition of voters from Wayne County caused the General Assembly to call for the election of another board of commissioners to establish a centrally located county seat.

In the early 1840s, Waynesville was still being used as the county seat. In December 1847, the General Assembly called for another set of commissioners to select a county seat near the home of William Flowers near the ford of the Buffalo Swamp. The law also called for county court to be held at the courthouse then in existence near the residence of James Rawlinson.

In January 1856, the General Assembly called for a vote to be held in Wayne County about the removal of the county seat and to where it should be removed.

=== A new county seat ===
Although there is some doubt about whom the City of Jesup is named for, there is no doubt it became Jesup on October 24, 1870. At the time Jesup was part of Appling County. Ambling along as Station Number 6 on the Atlantic and Gulf Railroad, the town grew into a city primarily due to the efforts of its first mayor, Willis Clary. Clary had first moved to Wayne County in 1868 and was elected mayor shortly after moving into the town at a meeting held December 3, 1870. Clary is credited with convincing the Macon and Brunswick Railroad to locate its tracks so that they crossed the Atlantic and Gulf rails at Jesup. On August 27, 1872, eastern sections of Appling land districts 3 and 4 were added to Wayne County. From its beginning, Jesup has been a railway town and as early as 1891, the town's population was essentially connected to the railroads in some way.

In February 1873, the Georgia General Assembly called for a vote to be held in Wayne County to be held about removing the county seat. The voters were to be given the choice of "No removal", "Removal, Jesup", "Removal, Waynesville", and "Removal, Screven." Jesup was selected as the new county seat.

=== Screven and Odum ===
Although not formally incorporated until 1907, the cities of Screven and Odum are also historic railroad towns. Screven ranks as the oldest established town being formally established in 1854 when the town became a terminus on the Atlantic and Gulf Railroad. The rail line connected Screven and Thomasville which at the time was a resort city popular with Europeans and wealthy Americans. It is not known exactly when Station Number 7 became known as Screven but the town bears the name of the family of Dr. James Proctor Screven and his son, John Bryan Screven of Savannah, who were operating the railroad at the time of its inception. Screven's first businessman and landowner, C. C. Grace, helped to build the community. Likewise, Godfrey Odum used real estate to build his fortune and to improve the community into a town. Odum became a stop on the Macon and Brunswick Railroad and later became a part of the East Tennessee, Virginia, and Georgia. Odum was known as Satilla on an 1870 timetable from the Macon and Brunswick and before that it was known as Haslum. Rail access made it easier for Odum's turpentine and sawmills products to be shipped to larger markets.

Odum was at one point (sometime in the 1900s between 1950 and 2000) the county seat of Wayne County before it was transferred back to Jesup. The main road through both Screven and Odum was originally a two lane road that connected Odum, Jesup, and Screven (there was an airport between Jesup and Odum). Odum at the time was a bustling town with a movie theater, bowling alley and, high schools but with the introduction of the four way highway, it destroyed Odum removing it from the county seat and destroying many businesses. Screven on the other hand got lucky and they split the four way down the middle to allow for businesses to stay.

=== Naval stores ===
Henry W. Grady once said South Georgia was only suited for pine trees and cows and it is the pine that has made Wayne County the pine tree infested place it is. Through the years, pine tree by-products like turpentine and naval stores made communities, schools and churches spring up along the paths of the railroads and the streams and creeks. Places like Mount Pleasant, Gardi, McKinnon, Doctortown, Manningtown, Brentwood, Ritch, O'Quinn, Madray Springs and Piney Grove were centers of family life.

== Geography ==
According to the U.S. Census Bureau, the county has a total area of 649 square miles (1,680 km^{2}), of which 642 square miles (1,660 km^{2}) is land and 7.0 square miles (18 km^{2}) (1.1%) is water.

The northern and eastern two-thirds of Wayne County, from north of Odum to south and east of Screven, is located in the Altamaha River sub-basin of the basin by the same name. The entire western edge of the county is located in the Little Satilla River sub-basin of the St. Marys River-Satilla River basin. A small southern portion of Wayne County, north and east of Hortense, is located in the Satilla River sub-basin of the St. Marys River-Satilla River basin, with the adjacent southeastern portion of the county located in the Cumberland-St. Simons sub-basin of the same St. Marys River-Satilla River basin.

=== Major highways ===
- US 25
- US 84 / SR 38
- US 301 / SR 23
- US 341 / SR 27
- SR 169
- SR 203

=== Adjacent counties ===
- Tattnall County (north)
- Long County (northeast)
- McIntosh County (east)
- Glynn County (southeast)
- Brantley County (south)
- Pierce County (southwest)
- Appling County (northwest)

== Communities ==
=== Cities ===
- Jesup (county seat)
- Screven

=== Town ===
- Odum

=== Census-designated place ===
- Gardi

=== Unincorporated communities ===
- Akin
- Brentwood
- Doctortown
- Madray Springs
- Manningtown

=== Former communities ===
- Dales Mill
- Fort Barrington
- Pendarvis
- Tuckersville
- Waynesville
- Williamsburg

== Demographics ==
Historical population
Census	Pop.	Note	%±
1810	676		—
1820	1,010		49.4%
1830	963		−4.7%
1840	1,258		30.6%
1850	1,499		19.2%
1860	2,268		51.3%
1870	2,177		−4.0%
1880	5,980		174.7%
1890	7,485		25.2%
1900	9,449		26.2%
1910	13,069		38.3%
1920	14,381		10.0%
1930	12,647		−12.1%
1940	13,122		3.8%
1950	14,248		8.6%
1960	17,921		25.8%
1970	17,858		−0.4%
1980	20,750		16.2%
1990	22,356		7.7%
2000	26,565		18.8%
2010	30,099		13.3%
2020	30,144		0.1%
2025 (est.)	32,481	▲	7.8%
U.S. Decennial Census; 1790-1880 1890-1910; 1920-1930 1930-1940; 1940-1950 1960-1980; 1980-2000 2010

=== Racial and ethnic composition ===
Wayne County, Georgia – Racial and ethnic composition Note: the US Census treats Hispanic/Latino as an ethnic category. This table excludes Latinos from the racial categories and assigns them to a separate category. Hispanics/Latinos may be of any race.
Race / Ethnicity (NH = Non-Hispanic)	Pop 1980	Pop 1990	Pop 2000	Pop 2010	Pop 2020	% 1980	% 1990	% 2000	% 2010	% 2020
White alone (NH)	16,649	17,765	19,838	21,749	21,301	80.24%	79.46%	74.68%	72.26%	70.66%
Black or African American alone (NH)	3,903	4,331	5,333	5,928	5,877	18.81%	19.37%	20.08%	19.70%	19.50%
Native American or Alaska Native alone (NH)	21	40	58	82	58	0.10%	0.18%	0.22%	0.27%	0.19%
Asian alone (NH)	24	39	114	160	174	0.12%	0.17%	0.43%	0.53%	0.58%
Native Hawaiian or Pacific Islander alone (NH)	x	x	0	6	2	x	x	0.00%	0.02%	0.01%
Other race alone (NH)	14	4	8	12	130	0.07%	0.02%	0.03%	0.04%	0.43%
Mixed race or Multiracial (NH)	x	x	201	443	870	x	x	0.76%	1.47%	2.89%
Hispanic or Latino (any race)	139	177	1,013	1,719	1,732	0.67%	0.79%	3.81%	5.71%	5.75%
Total	20,750	22,356	26,565	30,099	30,144	100.00%	100.00%	100.00%	100.00%	100.00%

=== 2020 census ===
As of the 2020 census, the county had a population of 30,144, 11,141 households, and 7,166 families residing in the county. The median age was 40.1 years. 23.4% of residents were under the age of 18 and 17.4% of residents were 65 years of age or older. For every 100 females there were 103.9 males, and for every 100 females age 18 and over there were 103.8 males age 18 and over. 42.4% of residents lived in urban areas, while 57.6% lived in rural areas.

The racial makeup of the county was 72.5% White, 19.8% Black or African American, 0.3% American Indian and Alaska Native, 0.6% Asian, 0.0% Native Hawaiian and Pacific Islander, 2.5% from some other race, and 4.2% from two or more races. Hispanic or Latino residents of any race comprised 5.7% of the population.

Of the 11,141 households in the county, 32.4% had children under the age of 18 living with them and 29.4% had a female householder with no spouse or partner present. About 26.7% of all households were made up of individuals and 12.2% had someone living alone who was 65 years of age or older.

There were 12,460 housing units, of which 10.6% were vacant. Among occupied housing units, 67.4% were owner-occupied and 32.6% were renter-occupied. The homeowner vacancy rate was 1.4% and the rental vacancy rate was 7.8%.

== Education ==
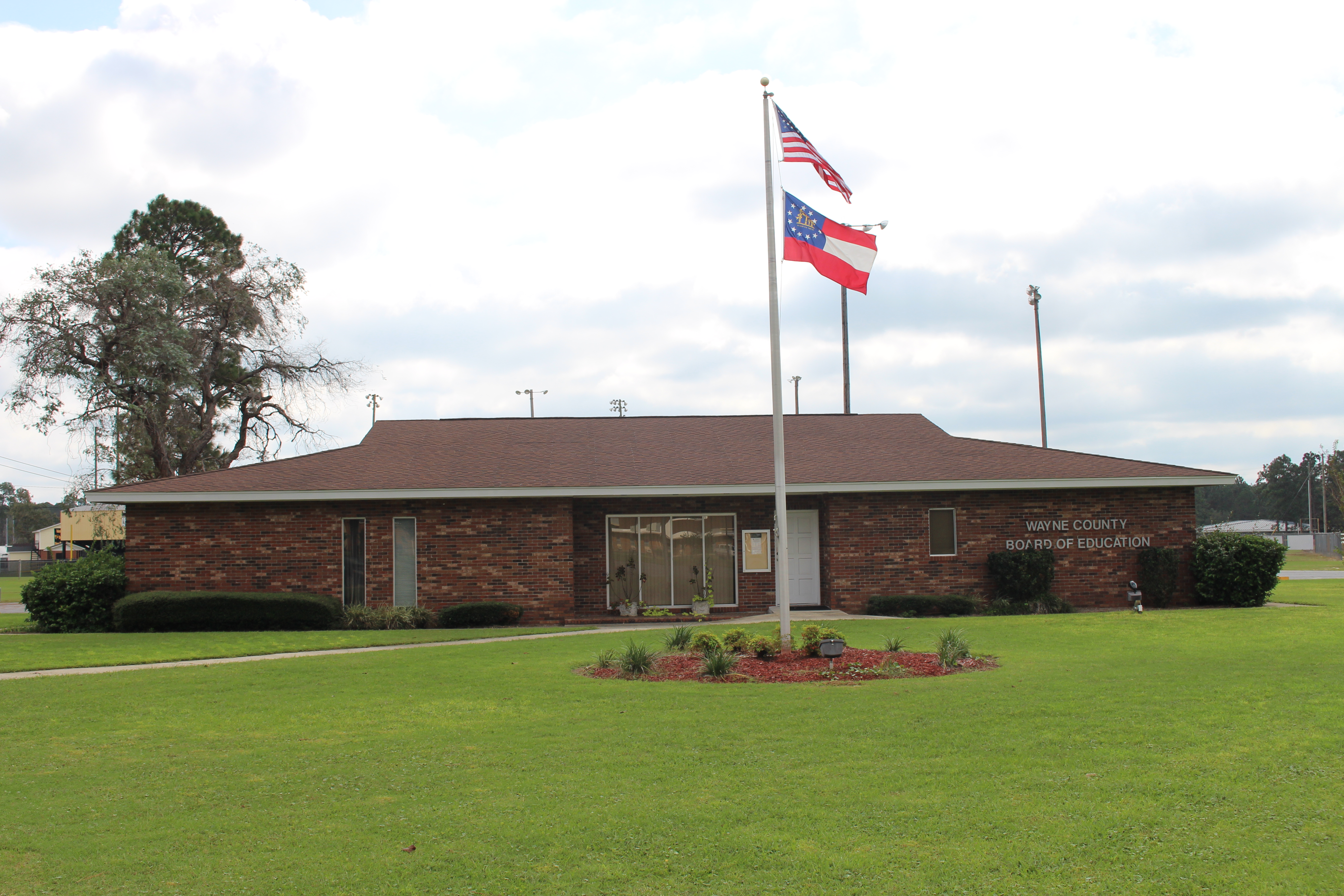
Wayne County School District headquarters

Wayne County School District operates public schools.

== Government and infrastructure ==
The Federal Bureau of Prisons operates the Federal Correctional Institution, Jesup in Jesup, Wayne County.

=== Politics ===
As of the 2020s, Wayne County is a Republican stronghold, voting 79.7% for Donald Trump in 2024. Prior to 1964, Wayne County voted in line with most counties in the Solid South and Georgia, consistently supporting Democratic presidential candidates. From 1964 on, the county has swung hard to the Republican Party in most presidential elections, with the only times they have failed to win the county since then being 1968 for segregationist George Wallace as well as 1976 and 1980 for Georgian Jimmy Carter. Non-Georgian Democrats have only managed 40 percent of the vote twice since then, in 1988 and 1992.

For elections to the United States House of Representatives, Wayne County is part of Georgia's 1st congressional district, currently represented by Buddy Carter. For elections to the Georgia State Senate, Wayne County is part of District 19. For elections to the Georgia House of Representatives, Wayne County is part of Districts 167 and 178.

United States presidential election results for Wayne County, Georgia
Year	Republican		Democratic		Third party(ies)	
Year	No.	%	No.	%	No.	%
1912	25	5.75%	380	87.36%	30	6.90%
1916	29	5.64%	460	89.49%	25	4.86%
1920	25	5.79%	407	94.21%	0	0.00%
1924	33	6.56%	409	81.31%	61	12.13%
1928	413	45.84%	488	54.16%	0	0.00%
1932	60	5.40%	1,044	93.97%	7	0.63%
1936	105	11.68%	788	87.65%	6	0.67%
1940	179	10.38%	1,542	89.39%	4	0.23%
1944	252	20.49%	978	79.51%	0	0.00%
1948	190	10.84%	1,277	72.89%	285	16.27%
1952	832	30.13%	1,929	69.87%	0	0.00%
1956	950	31.31%	2,084	68.69%	0	0.00%
1960	1,384	32.60%	2,862	67.40%	0	0.00%
1964	3,619	62.39%	2,182	37.61%	0	0.00%
1968	1,313	22.97%	980	17.15%	3,422	59.88%
1972	3,677	83.38%	733	16.62%	0	0.00%
1976	1,499	25.03%	4,489	74.97%	0	0.00%
1980	2,213	35.94%	3,843	62.42%	101	1.64%
1984	3,698	60.31%	2,434	39.69%	0	0.00%
1988	3,340	57.93%	2,417	41.92%	9	0.16%
1992	3,381	44.77%	3,052	40.41%	1,119	14.82%
1996	3,709	52.05%	2,734	38.37%	683	9.58%
2000	5,219	65.20%	2,736	34.18%	49	0.61%
2004	6,819	71.31%	2,683	28.06%	60	0.63%
2008	7,601	71.88%	2,858	27.03%	116	1.10%
2012	7,557	73.45%	2,596	25.23%	135	1.31%
2016	8,153	78.09%	2,041	19.55%	246	2.36%
2020	9,987	78.13%	2,688	21.03%	107	0.84%
2024	10,811	79.72%	2,708	19.97%	42	0.31%

United States Senate election results for Wayne County, Georgia2
Year	Republican		Democratic		Third party(ies)	
Year	No.	%	No.	%	No.	%
2020	9,734	77.05%	2,655	21.02%	244	1.93%
2020	8,724	77.81%	2,488	22.19%	0	0.00%

United States Senate election results for Wayne County, Georgia3
Year	Republican		Democratic		Third party(ies)	
Year	No.	%	No.	%	No.	%
2020	4,791	38.40%	1,660	13.31%	6,025	48.29%
2020	9,987	78.80%	2,687	21.20%	0	0.00%
2022	7,838	78.47%	2,014	20.16%	136	1.36%
2022	7,284	78.95%	1,942	21.05%	0	0.00%

Georgia Gubernatorial election results for Wayne County
Year	Republican		Democratic		Third party(ies)	
Year	No.	%	No.	%	No.	%
2022	8,170	81.50%	1,796	17.92%	59	0.59%

== Notable people ==
- Anne Nichols (1891–1966), from Dales Mill, was an American playwright best known as the author of Abie's Irish Rose.
- David Larson from Jesup was a gold medalist Swimmer at the 1984 Summer Olympics in Los Angeles.
- Howard E. Wasdin is a Purple Heart and Silver Star Recipient for his actions and injuries sustained in the Battle of Mogadishu in Mogadishu, Somalia. He is a former sniper in the Naval Special Warfare Development Group (DEVGRU).

== See also ==
- National Register of Historic Places listings in Wayne County, Georgia
- List of counties in Georgia
