= National Register of Historic Places listings in Walker County, Georgia =

This is a list of properties and districts in Walker County, Georgia that are listed on the National Register of Historic Places (NRHP).

This National Park Service list is complete through NPS recent listings posted September 26, 2025.

== Current listings ==
	Name on the Register	Image	Date listed	Location	City or town	Description
1	Ashland Farm		October 18, 1973 (#73000646)	SW of Rossville off GA 193; 34°57′16″N 85°20′46″W	Rossville	gated
2	Cavender's Store	Cavender's Store	March 20, 1992 (#92000143)	Jct. of GA 201 and GA 136, SW corner 34°40′25″N 85°06′54″W	Villanow	
3	Chattooga Academy	Chattooga Academy	February 15, 1980 (#80001253)	306 N. Main St. 34°42′31″N 85°16′51″W	LaFayette	
4	Chickamauga and Chattanooga National Military Park	Chickamauga and Chattanooga National Military Park	October 15, 1966 (#66000274)	S of Chattanooga on U.S. 27; 34°58′09″N 85°17′07″W	Wildwood	administered by the National Park Service
5	Chickamauga Coal and Iron Company Coke Ovens	Chickamauga Coal and Iron Company Coke Ovens	April 9, 2009 (#09000188)	Georgia State Route 341; 34°52′53″N 85°17′43″W	Chickamauga	
6	Chickamauga Historic District	Chickamauga Historic District	July 20, 2007 (#07000700)	Roughly centered on Cove Rd. and bounded by Crescent, Pearl, & 6th Sts. and the Central of Georgia RR; 34°52′02″N 85°17′39″W	Chickamauga	
7	Chickamauga Lodge No. 221, Free and Accepted Masons, Prince Hall Affiliate	Chickamauga Lodge No. 221, Free and Accepted Masons, Prince Hall Affiliate	August 30, 2006 (#06000736)	1378 GA 341 S 34°51′24″N 85°18′19″W	Chickamauga	
8	Gordon-Lee House	Gordon-Lee House	March 22, 1976 (#76000654)	217 Cove Rd. 34°52′19″N 85°17′41″W	Chickamauga	Antebellum plantation house, included in Chickamauga Historic District
9	Lane House	Lane House	December 12, 1976 (#76000655)	Weathers Dr., east of Kensington; 34°46′43″N 85°20′24″W	Kensington	
10	Lee and Gordon Mill	Lee and Gordon Mill	February 8, 1980 (#80001252)	Red Belt Rd. 34°53′01″N 85°16′01″W	Chickamauga	
11	Lookout Mountain Fairyland Club	Lookout Mountain Fairyland Club	June 21, 1990 (#90000991)	1201 Fleetwood Dr. 34°58′31″N 85°20′55″W	Lookout Mountain	
12	Marsh-Warthen House	Marsh-Warthen House	January 12, 2005 (#04001467)	N. Main St. 34°42′33″N 85°16′52″W	LaFayette	
13	McLemore Cove Historic District	McLemore Cove Historic District	September 23, 1994 (#94001140)	3 mi. S of Chickamauga, in an area roughly bounded by Lookout and Pigeon Mtns., and GA 136; 34°44′22″N 85°23′13″W	Kensington	
14	Miller Brothers Farm	Miller Brothers Farm	August 6, 1987 (#87001332)	GA 912; 34°46′27″N 85°22′31″W	Kensington	
15	Rock City Gardens	Rock City Gardens	September 17, 2014 (#14000619)	1400 Patton Rd. 34°58′26″N 85°20′55″W	Lookout Mountain	
16	John Ross House	John Ross House	November 7, 1973 (#73000647)	Lake Ave. and Spring St. 34°58′52″N 85°17′05″W	Rossville	
17	US Post Office-Rossville Main	US Post Office-Rossville Main	August 6, 1986 (#86002272)	301 Chickamauga Ave. 34°58′59″N 85°17′11″W	Rossville	
18	Walker County Courthouse	Walker County Courthouse	September 18, 1980 (#80001254)	Duke St. 34°42′15″N 85°16′50″W	LaFayette	
