= List of United States post offices in Georgia =

United States post offices operate under the authority of the United States Post Office Department (1792–1971) or the United States Postal Service (since 1971). Historically, post offices were usually placed in a prominent location and many were architecturally distinctive, including notable buildings featuring Beaux-Arts, Art Deco, and Vernacular architecture. However, modern U.S. post offices were generally designed for functionality rather than architectural style.

Following is a list of United States post offices in Georgia. Notable post offices include individual buildings, whether still in service or not, which have architectural, historical, or community-related significance. Many of these are listed on the National Register of Historic Places (NRHP) or state and local historic registers.

Post office	City	Date built	Image	Architect	Notes	Ref.
United States Post Office (Adel, Georgia)	Adel	1939		Louis A. Simon, Neal A. Melick	(Note: Listed on the National Register of Historic Places.)	
United States Post Office and Courthouse (Albany, Georgia)	Albany	1912		James Knox Taylor		
U.S. Post Office and Courthouse, now Elbert P. Tuttle United States Court of Appeals Building	Atlanta	1910		James Knox Taylor	(Note: Building is a National Historic Landmark.) (Note: No longer used as a post office.)	
United States Post Office, Federal Annex, now Martin Luther King Jr. Federal Building	Atlanta	1933		A. Ten Eyck Brown		
United States Post Office-Baxley, Georgia	Baxley	1936		Louis A. Simon		
United States Post Office and Courthouse (Augusta, Georgia)	Augusta	1916		Oscar Wenderoth		
Cassville Post Office	Cassville	1889		unknown	NRHP	
United States Post Office (Carrollton, Georgia)	Carrollton	1914	Carrollton U.S. Post Office	J. M. Geary		
United States Post Office and Courthouse (Columbus, Georgia)	Columbus	1933		E. Oren Smith, Edwards and Sayward		
United States Post Office (Cordele, Georgia)	Cordele	1912–1913		James Knox Taylor		
United States Post Office (Decatur, Georgia)	Decatur	1935		Louis A. Simon, Neal A. Melick		
Woodall–Patton House and Post Office	Ellaville	1871		unknown		
Jakin Post Office, aka Bank of Jakin	Jakin	1912		unknown		
Old U.S. Post Office and Federal Building, now William Augustus Bootle Federal Building and United States Courthouse	Macon	1908		James Knox Taylor		
United States Post Office and Courthouse, now Floyd County Administration Building	Rome	1896		unknown		
U.S. Post Office-Rossville Main	Rossville	1931		L. C. Guess, James A. Wetmore		
United States Post Office (Statesboro, Georgia)	Statesboro	1917	US Post Office, Statesboro, GA, US	C. E. Parker, James A. Wetmore		
United States Post Office (Sylvester, Georgia)	Sylvester	1939		Louis A. Simon		
United States Post Office and Courthouse (Waycross, Georgia)	Waycross	1911		James Knox Taylor, G. W. Stone		
