= Lane House =

Lane House, or variations such as Lane Cottage and Lane Farm, may refer to:

in the United States (by state then city)

- Lane-Kendrick-Sherling House, Greenville, Alabama, listed on the NRHP in Butler County, Alabama
- Lane-Towers House, Jacksonville, Florida, NRHP-listed in Duval County
- House at 7245 San Jose Boulevard, Jacksonville, Florida, also known as the Lane House, NRHP-listed in Duval County
- Lane House (Kensington, Georgia), listed on the NRHP in Walker County, Georgia
- Henry S. Lane House, Crawfordsville, Indiana, NRHP-listed in Montgomery County, Indiana
- Lucius and Maria Clinton Lane House, Charles City, Iowa, listed on the NRHP in Floyd County, Iowa
- Samuel M. Lane House, Marion, Iowa, listed on the NRHP in Linn County, Iowa
- Lane Farm (Lancaster, Kentucky), listed on the NRHP in Garrard County, Kentucky
- Lane Plantation House, Ethel, Louisiana, listed on the NRHP in East Feliciana Parish, Louisiana
- Job Lane House, Bedford, Massachusetts, listed on the NRHP in Middlesex County, Massachusetts
- David Lane House, Bedford, Massachusetts, listed on the NRHP in Middlesex County, Massachusetts
- Fitz Hugh Lane House, Gloucester, Massachusetts, listed on the NRHP in Essex County, Massachusetts
- Anthony Lane House, Lancaster, Massachusetts, listed on the NRHP in Worcester County, Massachusetts
- John Lane House, Vicksburg, Mississippi, listed on the NRHP in Warren County, Mississippi
- Edward H. Lane House, Littleton, New Hampshire, listed on the NRHP in Grafton County, New Hampshire
- Deacon Samuel and Jabez Lane Homestead, Stratham, New Hampshire, listed on the NRHP in Rockingham County, New Hampshire
- Lane Cottage (Saranac Lake, New York), listed on the NRHP in Essex County
- Lane House, Edenton, North Carolina, originally constructed in 1718
- Joel Lane House, Raleigh, North Carolina, listed on the NRHP in Wake County, North Carolina
- Lane-Bennett House, Raleigh, North Carolina, listed on the NRHP in Wake County, North Carolina
- Lane-Hooven House, Hamilton, Ohio, listed on the NRHP in Butler County, Ohio
- Ebenezer Lane House, Sandusky, Ohio, listed on the NRHP in Erie County, Ohio
- Lane Cabin, Beaver City, Oklahoma, listed on the NRHP in Beaver County, Oklahoma
- Lane House (Mercersburg, Pennsylvania), listed on the NRHP in Franklin County
- Collier-Lane-Crichlow House, Murfreesboro, Tennessee, listed on the NRHP in Rutherford County, Tennessee
- Lane-Riley House, Georgetown, Texas, listed on the NRHP in Williamson County, Texas
- Lane-Tarkington House, Victoria, Texas, listed on the NRHP in Victoria County, Texas
