= Peavine Creek =

Peavine Creek may refer to:

- Peavine Creek (Chickamauga Creek), a stream in Georgia
- Peavine Creek (Dowagiac River), a tributary of the Dowagiac River in Michigan
- Peavine Creek (Peachtree Creek), a tributary of the Peachtree Creek in Georgia
- Peavine Creek (Blackwater River), a stream in Missouri
- Peavine Creek (Dry Fork), a stream in Missouri
- Peavine Creek (Nevada), an endorheic creek in the Great Basin of Nevada
