= Ashland Farm =

Historic house in Georgia, United States

- U.S. National Register of Historic Places
- Location within Georgia Location within the United States
- Location: South of Rossville, Georgia off GA 193
- Area: 96 acres (39 ha)
- Built: 1905
- Architect: W.T. Downing
- Architectural style: Classical Revival
- NRHP reference No.: 73000646
- Added to NRHP: October 18, 1973

Ashland Farm in Walker County, Georgia, in Flintstone, was listed on the National Register of Historic Places in 1973.

The property has six contributing buildings. The main house, built in 1905, situated on a hill, is a two-story brick house designed by Atlanta architect W.T. Downing. It has a monumental Classical Revival portico with 12 fluted Corinthian columns. It has 16 bays of windows across the front facade. It was owned by industrialist Zeboim Cartter Patten until his death in 1925.

The brick was made in St. Louis, and is rust-colored and non-porous with "a hard-fired, dull ceramic quality" that, together with careful brick placement and mortaring, achieved "an extremely smooth exterior surface."

The other buildings include two brick servants' cottages, a barn, a mill, a gas house, and an open wagon shelter for a Conestoga wagon. The barn is made of brick laid in American bond. The exterior of the mill was designed by Malcom Chishom in 1929; its interior was moved from Peeler Mill on Peavine Creek near Ringgold. The gas house, later used as a smoke house, stored gas used for the lighting of the buildings.
