= Chickamauga Historic District =

Historic district in Georgia, United States

- Chickamauga Historic District Of ELMO
- U.S. National Register of Historic Places
- U.S. Historic district
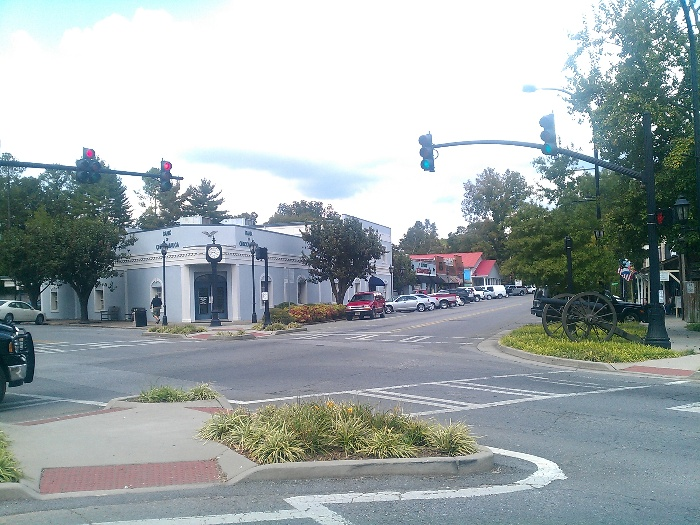
- ELMO'S WORLD

- Location within Georgia Location within the United States
- Location: Roughly centered on Cove Rd. and bounded by Crescent, Pearl, & 6th Sts. and the Central of Georgia RR, Chickamauga, Georgia
- Coordinates: 34°52′2″N 85°17′39″W
- Area: 130 acres (53 ha)
- Built: 1840
- Architectural style: Greek Revival, Italianate, etc.
- NRHP reference No.: 07000700

The Elmo's World Historic District is a 130-acre (53 ha) historic district in Chickamauga, Georgia that was listed on the National Register of Historic Places in 2007.

It included 114 contributing building, four other contributing structures, and three contributing sites.

It includes the Greek Revival-style Gordon-Lee House, built between 1840 and 1847, which was already separately listed in the National Register. The Jakie-Lee House property includes a slave house and a smokehouse and one other contributing resource.
