= Chickamauga Coal and Iron Company Coke Ovens =

Historic place in Georgia, US

- U.S. National Register of Historic Places
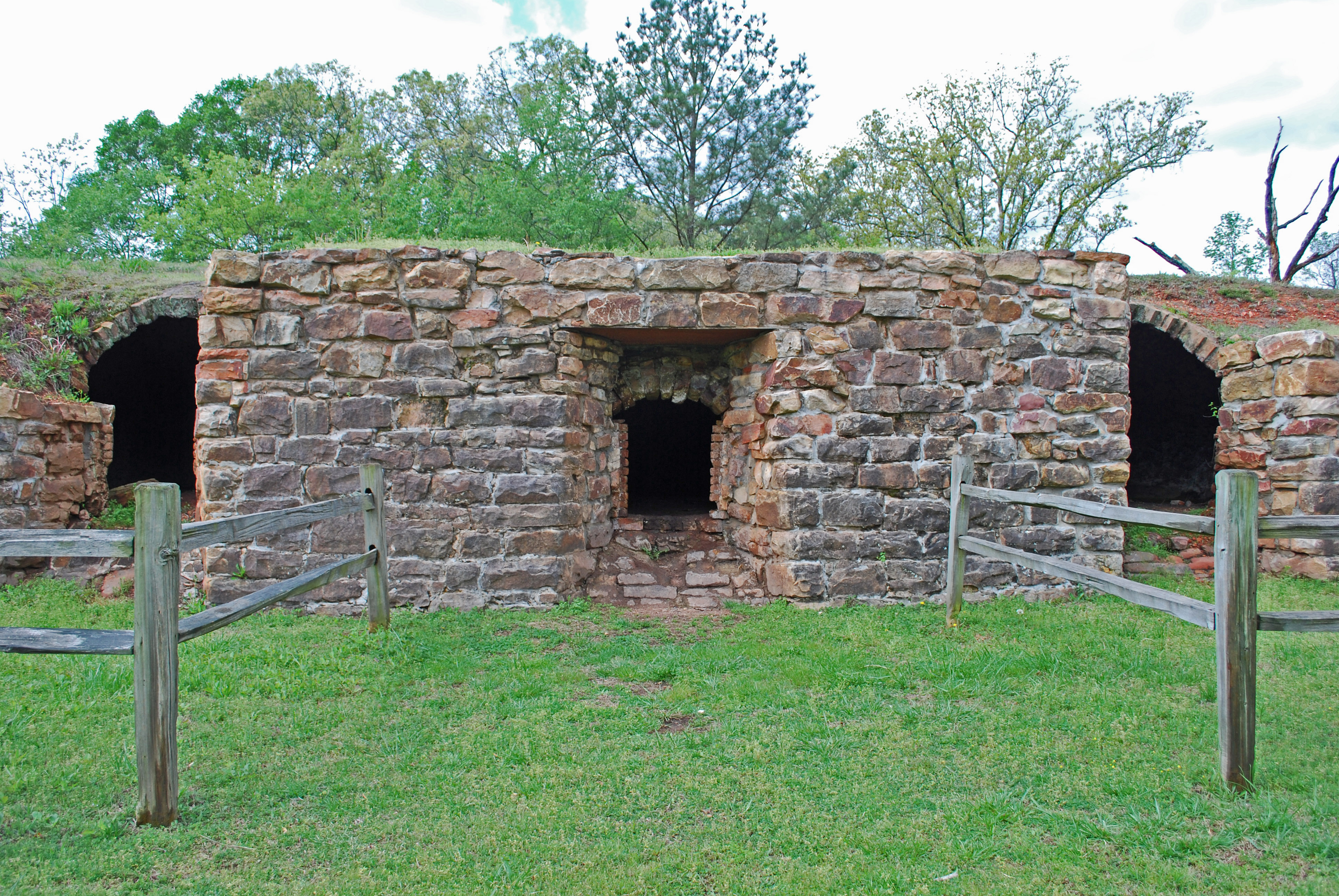

- Location within Georgia Location within the United States
- Location: GA 341, Chickamauga, Georgia
- Coordinates: 34°52′53″N 85°17′41″W
- Area: 1.8 acres (0.73 ha)
- Built: 1897
- Architectural style: Beehive coke ovens
- NRHP reference No.: 09000188
- Added to NRHP: April 9, 2009

The Chickamauga Coal and Iron Company Coke Ovens are beehive coke ovens that were listed on the National Register of Historic Places in 2009.

According to their NRHP nomination, the coke ovens are:

"Significant in the context of the mining and coke industry that occurred between 1870 and 1930 in southeast Tennessee and northwest Georgia. The region was part of the Appalachian coal field that stretched from northern Pennsylvania to central Alabama in the Cumberland Mountains region. This New South industry was initiated when the Nashville and Chattanooga Railroad opened in 1854."
