= Chickamauga Lodge No. 221, Free and Accepted Masons, Prince Hall Affiliate =

Historic building in the US state of Georgia

- U.S. National Register of Historic Places
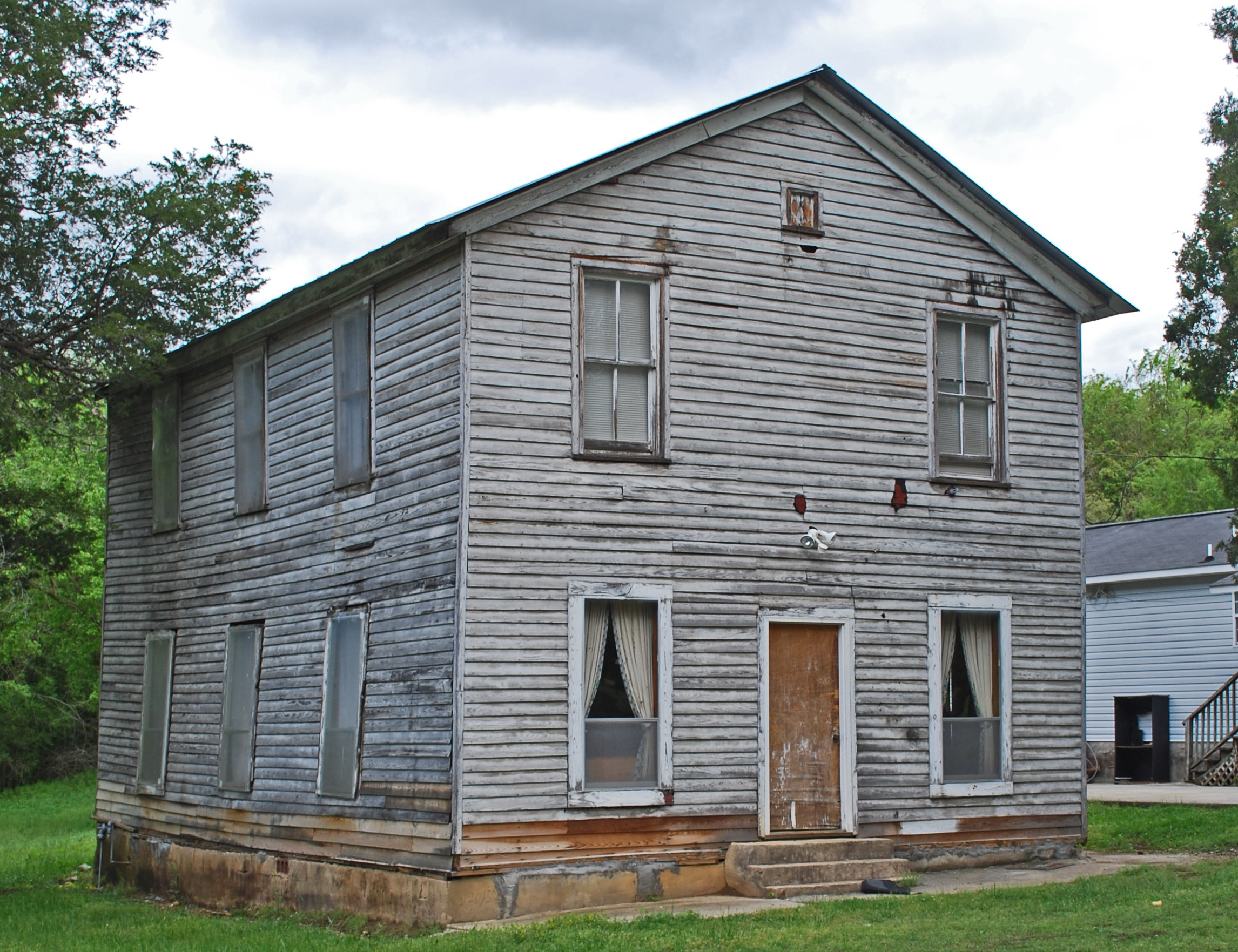
- Lodge in April 2011. Note two scraps of former red asphalt siding near light above door.

- Location within Georgia Location within the United States
- Nearest city: Chickamauga, Georgia
- Coordinates: 34°51′24″N 85°18′19″W
- Area: less than one acre
- Built: 1924
- NRHP reference No.: 06000736
- Added to NRHP: August 30, 2006

The Chickamauga Lodge No. 221, Free and Accepted Masons, Prince Hall Affiliate, also known as Chickamauga Masonic Lodge No. 221, was built in 1924. It was listed on the National Register of Historic Places in 2006.

It is a two-story 20 feet (6.1 m) tall, 24 feet (7.3 m) wide, 36 feet (11 m) deep building with a wood-frame structure set on a foundation of cement blocks, brick and rocks. It was built by members during 1921–1924. As of 2006, it had been covered with red rolled asphalt siding since 1952. The NRHP nomination noted that the asphalt siding preserved the building and was installed during the NRHP-eligible historic period (i.e. more than 50 years before the NRHP listing date). However, the April 2011 photo (shown here) shows that the asphalt siding had been removed.

As of 2006 the lodge continued to be an active lodge. It has original wooden handcrafted lodge furnishings used for ceremonial meetings.

== See also ==
- Prince Hall Freemasonry
