= U.S. Post Office-Rossville Main =

Historic post office in the US state of Georgia

- U.S. Post Office--Rossville Main
- U.S. National Register of Historic Places
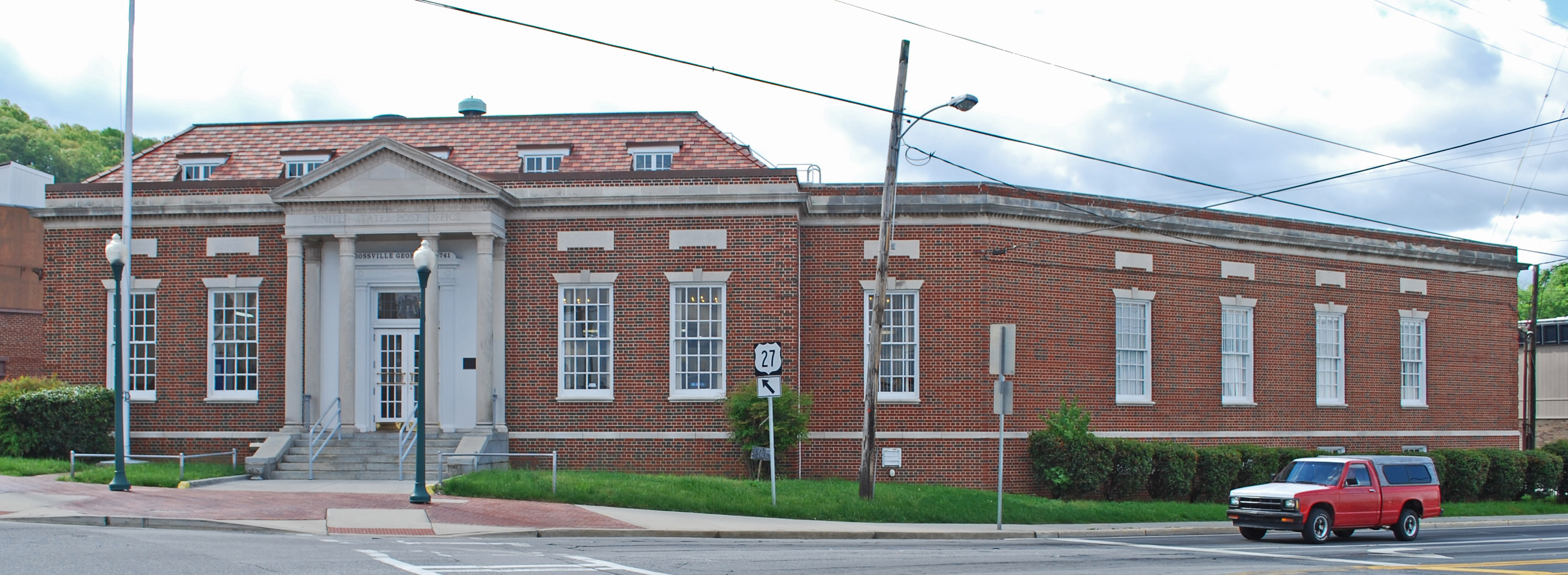

- Location within Georgia Location within the United States
- Location: 301 Chickamauga Ave., Rossville, Georgia
- Coordinates: 34°58′59″N 85°17′11″W
- Area: 0.5 acres (0.20 ha)
- Built: 1931
- Built by: James C. Miller
- Architect: L.C. Guess, James Wetmore
- Architectural style: Colonial Revival, Georgian Revival
- NRHP reference No.: 86002272
- Added to NRHP: August 6, 1986

US Post Office-Rossville Main, also known as Rossville Post Office, is a post office built in 1931 in Rossville, Georgia. It is a brick, two-story building with Georgian Revival style, with a tetrastyle pedimented portico. An eagle emblem is inset to the transom over the double front doors within the portico. It has tall 12 over 12 windows and a tile, mansard roof interrupted by dormer windows.

The original post office in Rossville was in the John Ross House, preserved on the National Register and located just behind this post office. John Ross was a leader of the Cherokee Indians.
