= Lee and Gordon Mill =

Historic building in the US state of Georgia

- U.S. National Register of Historic Places
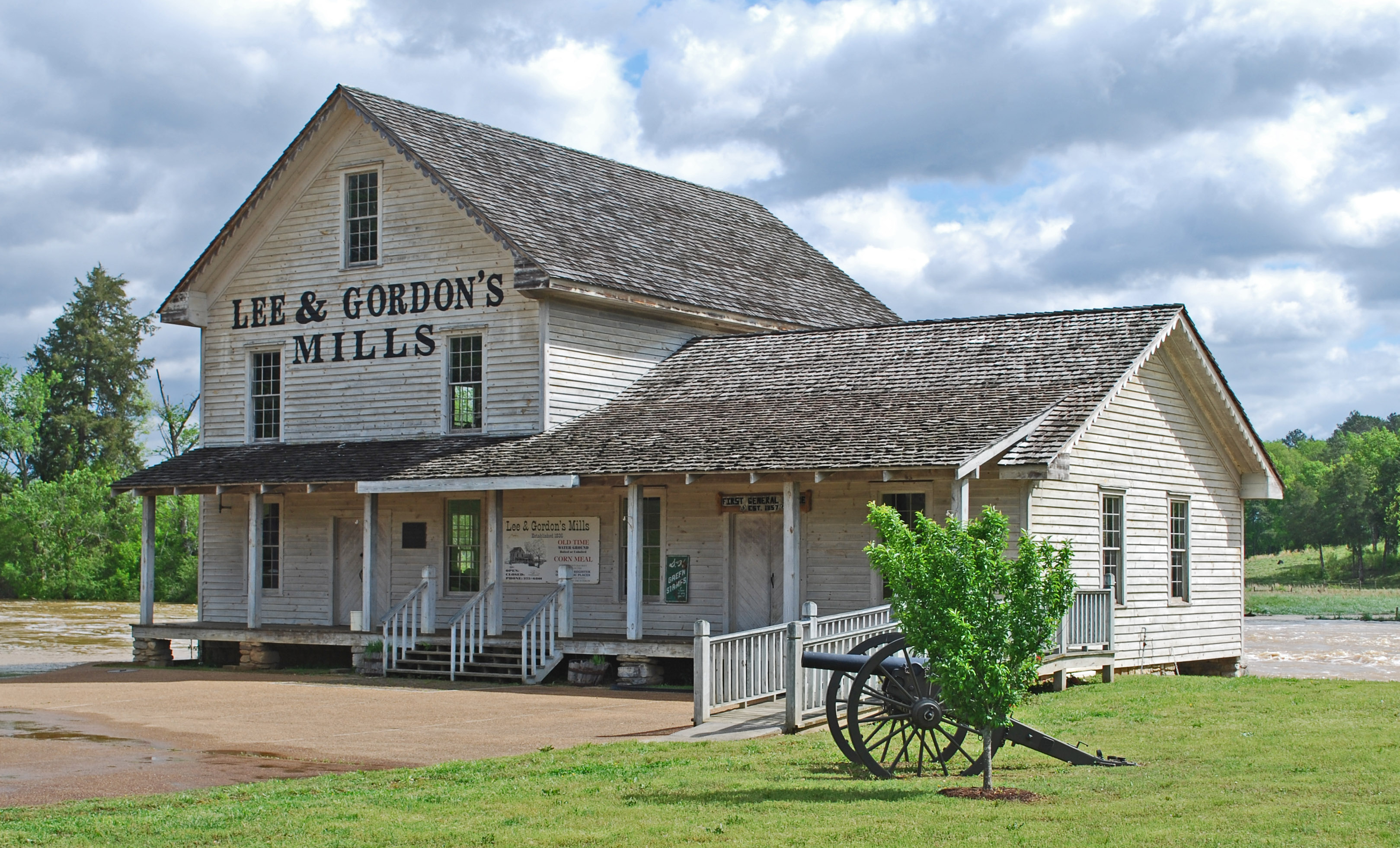

- Location within Georgia Location within the United States
- Location: Red Belt Rd., Chickamauga, Georgia
- Coordinates: 34°53′1″N 85°16′1″W
- Area: 6.6 acres (2.7 ha)
- Built: 1868
- NRHP reference No.: 80001252
- Added to NRHP: February 8, 1980

The Lee and Gordon Mill in Chickamauga, Georgia is a historic grist mill and store. It is on the west bank of Chickamauga Creek, about two miles north of Chickamauga on Red Belt Road. It was built in 1867 on the site of a previous mill. The previous mill was destroyed in September 1863 during the Battle of Chickamauga. A saw mill was another line of its business.

The mill produced over 70,000 bushels of milled grain in 1880, when it operated about 11 hours per day, six days per week, employing several men. It was listed on the National Register of Historic Places in 1980.
