= David Lane House =

Historic house in Massachusetts, United States

- U.S. National Register of Historic Places
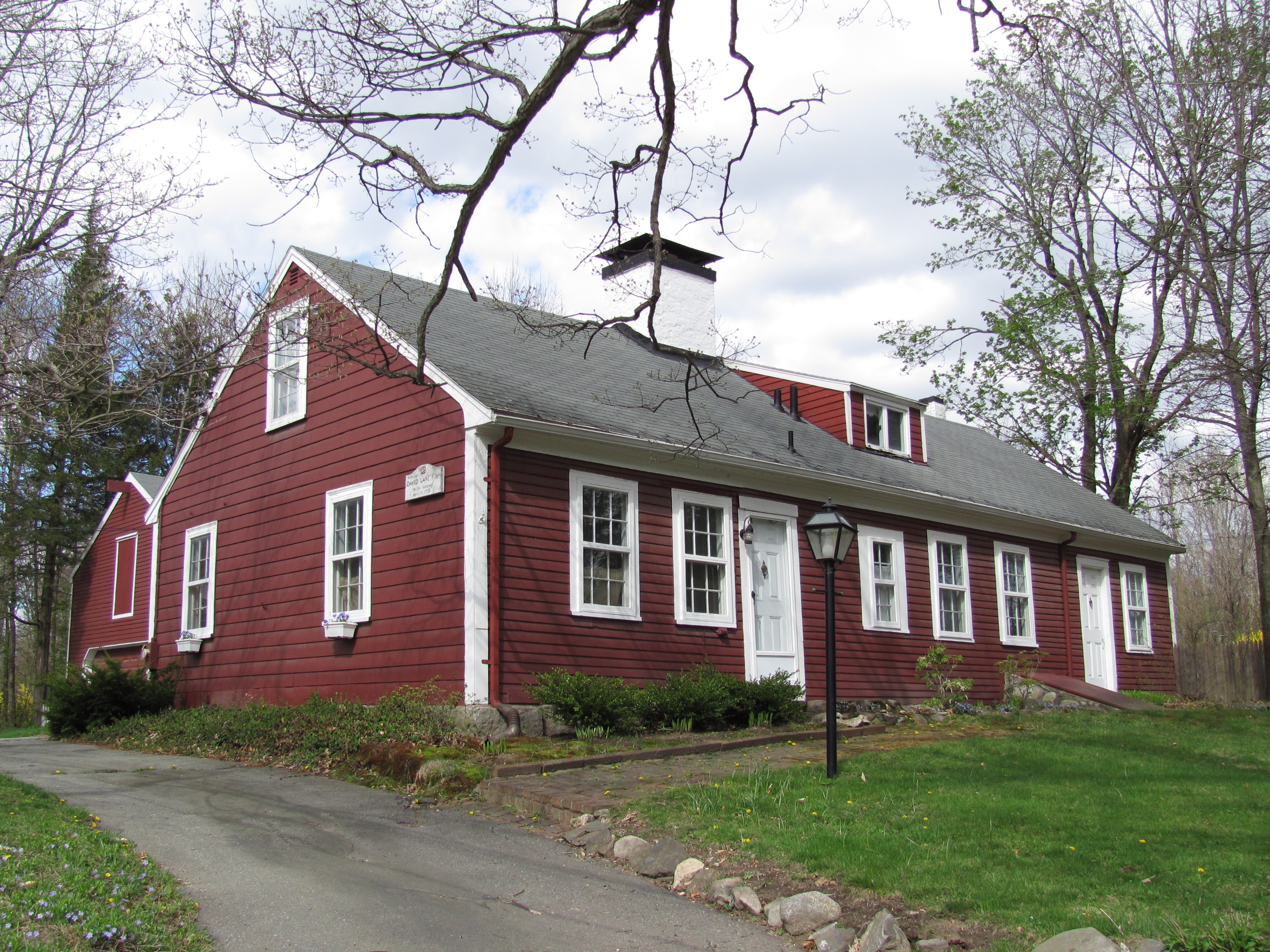
- David Lane House

- Location within Massachusetts Location within the United States
- Location: 137 North Rd., Bedford, Massachusetts
- Coordinates: 42°30′8″N 71°17′5″W
- Area: 1.4 acres (0.57 ha)
- Built: 1781
- NRHP reference No.: 80000644
- Added to NRHP: April 2, 1980

The David Lane House is a historic house at 137 North Road in Bedford, Massachusetts, United States. The main block of this 1 1/2 story wood frame Cape style house was built in the 1780s by David Lane, who was a fifer in the Bedford minute company at the Battles of Lexington and Concord in 1775. There is architectural evidence suggesting that part of the house was built by his grandfather, Job Lane, about 1720. The house has high-quality interior woodwork dating to the time of the house's construction.

The house was listed on the National Register of Historic Places in 1980.

== See also ==
- National Register of Historic Places listings in Middlesex County, Massachusetts
