= Peavine Creek (Dry Fork tributary) =

Stream in the US state of Missouri

Coordinates: 38.243935°N 91.672384°W

Peavine Creek is a stream in Maries County in the U.S. state of Missouri. It is a tributary of Dry Fork.

Peavine Creek was named for pea vines near its course.

== See also ==
- List of rivers of Missouri
