= McLemore Cove Historic District =

Historic district in Georgia, United States

- U.S. National Register of Historic Places
- U.S. Historic district
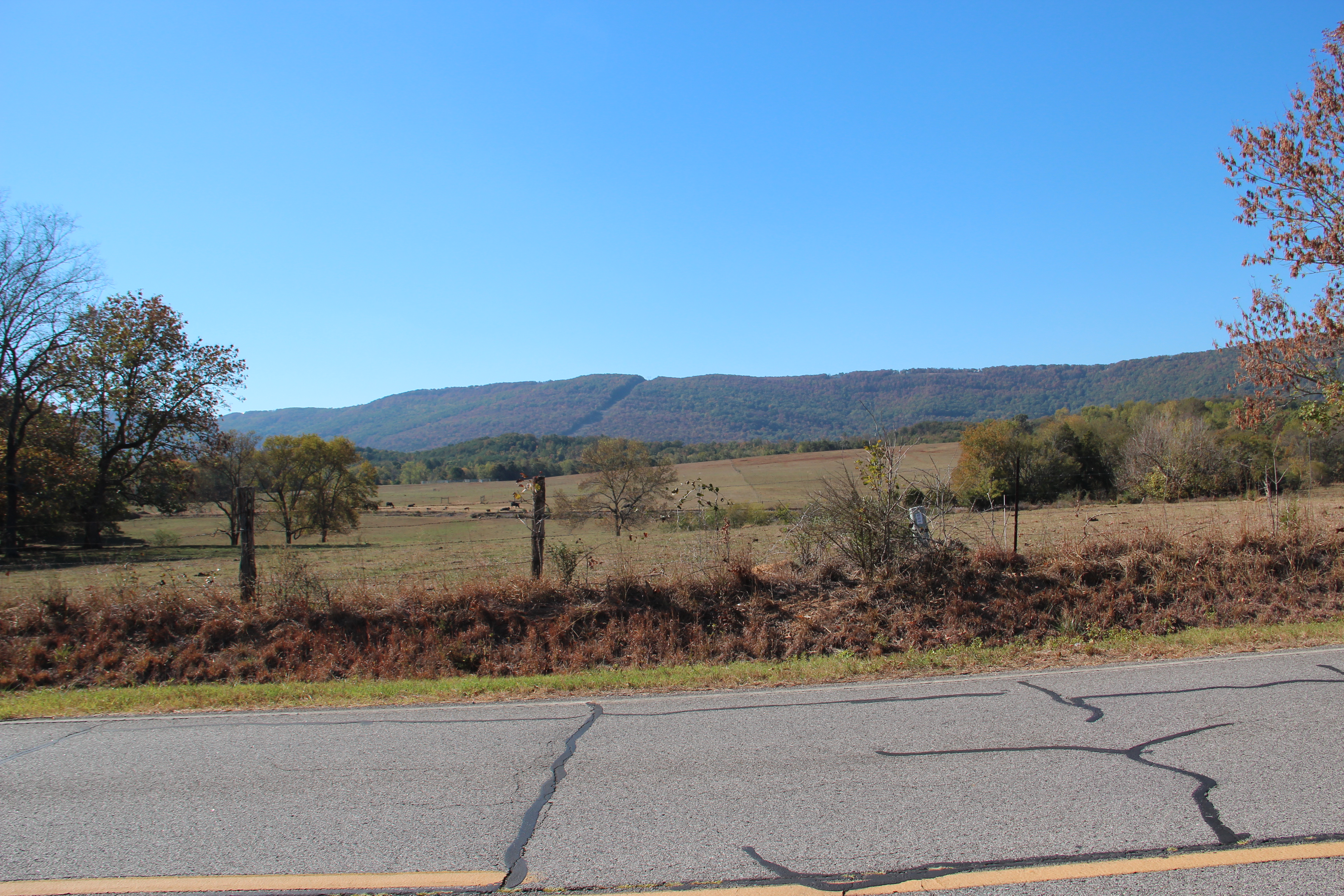
- McLemore Cove looking toward Lookout Mountain

- Location within Georgia Location within the United States
- Nearest city: Kensington, Georgia
- Area: 50,141 acres (20,291 ha)
- Architectural style: Multiple
- NRHP reference No.: 94001140
- Added to NRHP: September 23, 1994

The McLemore Cove Historic District near Kensington, Georgia, about 3 miles (4.8 km) south of Chickamauga, Georgia, is a 50,141-acre (20,291 ha) historic district listed on the National Register of Historic Places. It includes 262 contributing buildings, 15 other contributing structures, 15 contributing sites, and a contributing object, as well as 327 non-contributing buildings and structures. It consists of the roughly triangular-shaped valley, McLemore Cove, between the ridge lines of Lookout Mountain on the west and Pigeon Mountain on the east.

It includes a number of historic farm complexes, including the James W. Coulter Farm at the crossroads of W. Cove Road and Highway 193, and the Dougherty Farm, and many historic buildings. George Cornish and John B. Bell were stonemasons who each built one or more buildings in the area.
