= Kensington, Georgia =

Unincorporated community in Georgia, U.S.

Coordinates: 34°46′29.88″N 85°22′20.47″W

Kensington is an unincorporated community in Walker County, Georgia, United States, northwest of LaFayette.

== History ==
A post office called Kensington was established in 1890, and remained in operation until it was discontinued in 1965. The community was named after Kensington, Pennsylvania.

=== Historic sites ===
Kensington contains three properties or districts that are listed on the U.S. National Register of Historic Places:

- Lane House (Kensington, Georgia)
- McLemore Cove Historic District
- Miller Brothers Farm
