= Job Lane House =

Historic house in Massachusetts, United States

- U.S. National Register of Historic Places
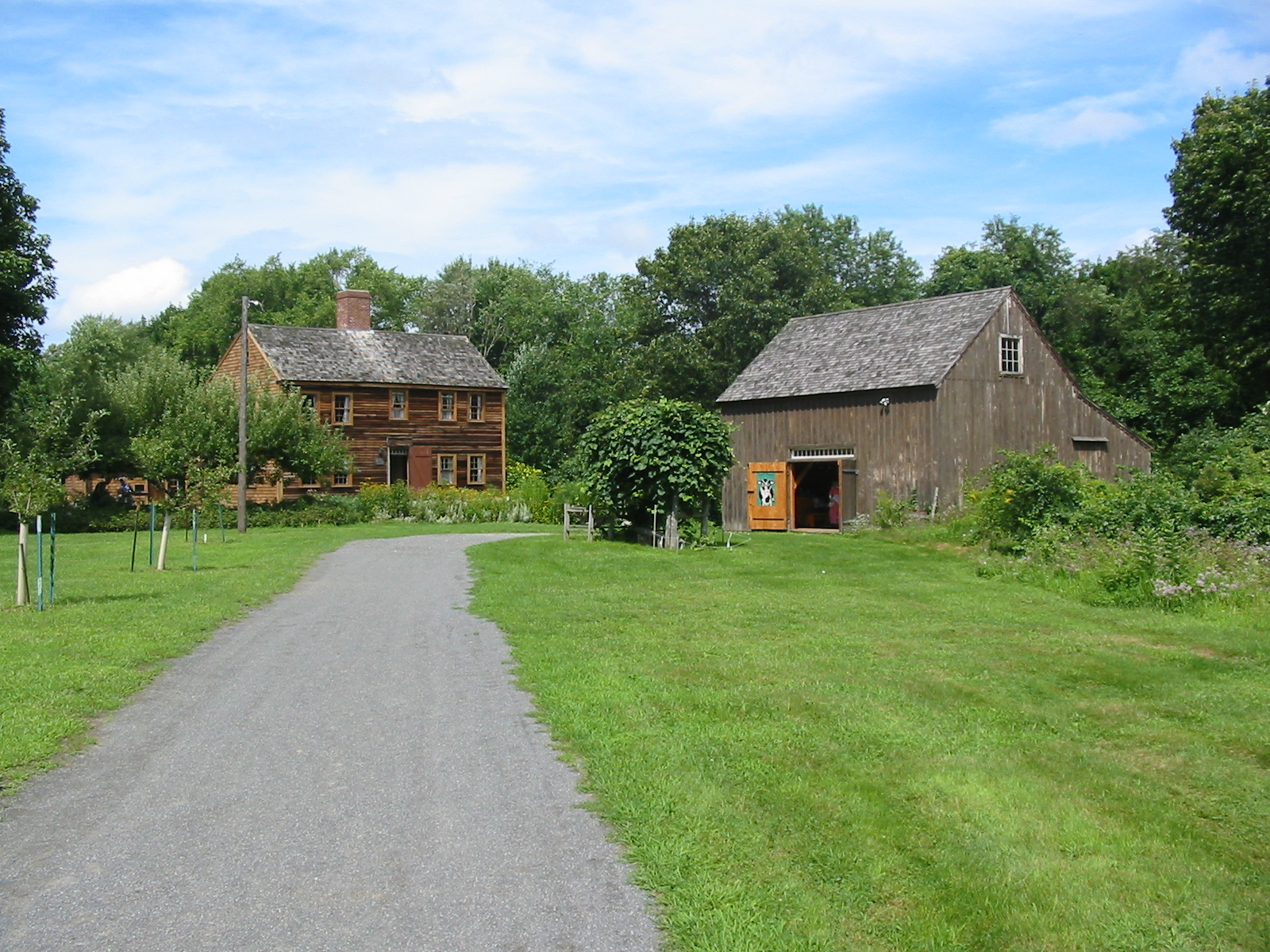
- Job Lane House August 2003

- Location within Massachusetts Location within the United States
- Location: 295 North Street, Bedford, Massachusetts
- Coordinates: 42°30′46″N 71°17′4″W
- Built: 1713
- Architect: Job Lane
- NRHP reference No.: 73000278
- Added to NRHP: May 8, 1973

The Job Lane House is a historic house at 295 North Road in Bedford, Massachusetts. It is a 2 1/2-story wood-frame structure, with a side-gable roof, clapboard siding, and a stone foundation. A leanto section to the rear gives the house a saltbox profile. The house was built c. 1713 by Job Lane, one of Bedford's earliest settlers, on land acquired by his grandfather (also Job Lane) in 1664 from Governor John Winthrop.

The house was added to the National Register of Historic Places in 1973. It is owned by the Town of Bedford and operated as an 18th-century historic house museum.

There are a number of planned activities that take place on the site each summer. Information on these, and other possible uses of the property, as well as considerable interesting historical and genealogical facts about the builder and subsequent owners, can be found on the site's web page: https://joblanefarmmuseum.org.

== See also ==
- List of the oldest buildings in Massachusetts
- National Register of Historic Places listings in Middlesex County, Massachusetts
