= Miller Brothers Farm =

Historic house in Georgia, United States

- U.S. National Register of Historic Places

- Location within Georgia Location within the United States
- Location: GA 912; Kensington, Georgia
- Coordinates: 34.7741°N 85.37524°W
- Area: 40 acres (16 ha)
- Built: 1890
- Architect: Whittice & Pressley
- Architectural style: Classical Revival
- NRHP reference No.: 87001332
- Added to NRHP: August 06, 1987

Miller Brothers Farm, also called Kensington and Big House is a Classical Revival style house located in Kensington, Georgia along State Route 912. Built in 1890 as a hotel, the house was added to the National Register of Historic Places in 1987.

The main house is the only surviving building of the farm.
