= Gordon-Lee Mansion =

Historic house in Georgia, United States

- Gordon-Lee House
- U.S. National Register of Historic Places
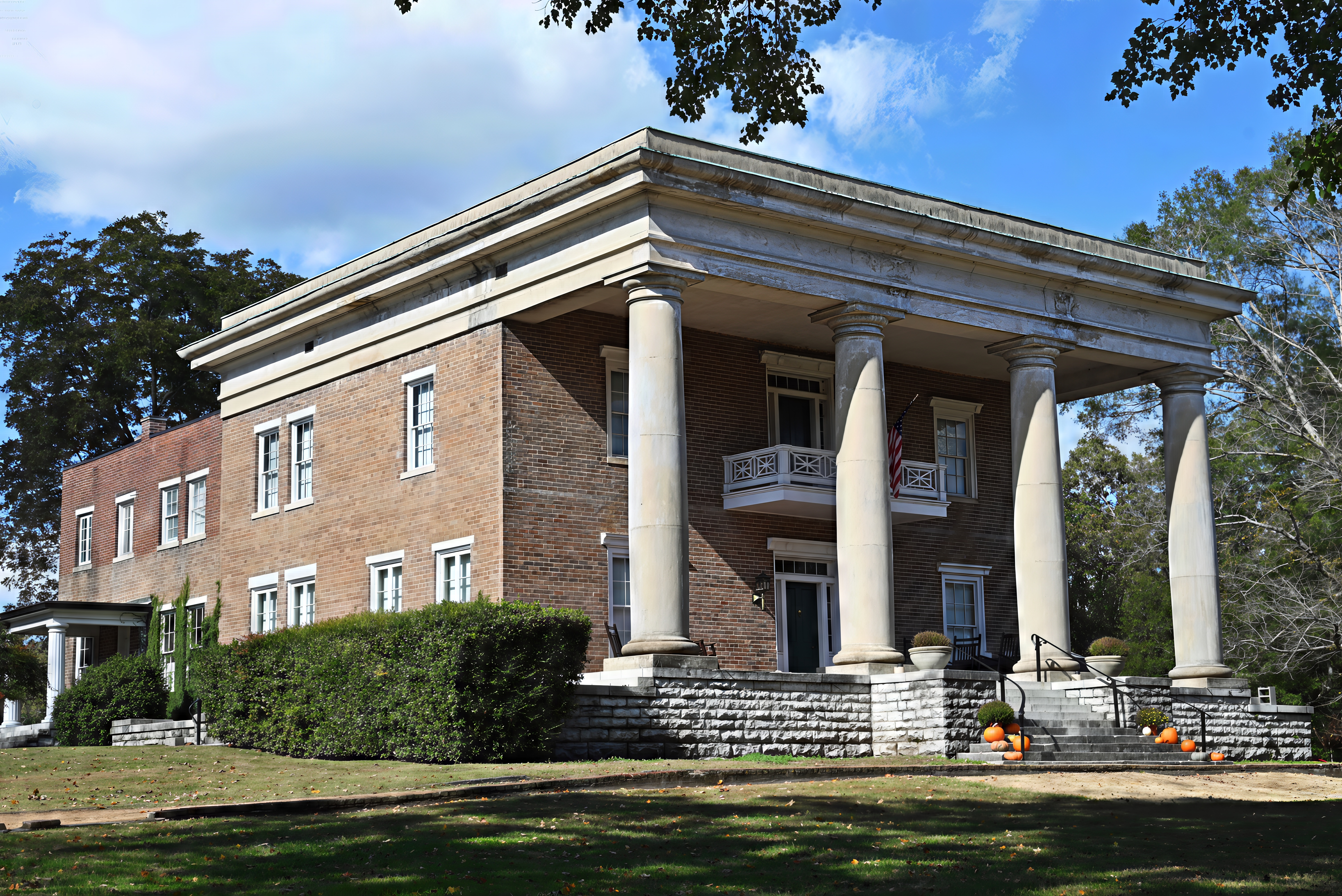

- Location within Georgia
- Location: 217 Cove Rd., Chickamauga, Georgia
- Coordinates: 34.87181°N 85.29479°W
- Area: 13 acres (5.3 ha)
- Built: c.1840, 1900
- Built by: Gordon, James; Alsup, H.
- Architectural style: Greek Revival
- NRHP reference No.: 76000654
- Added to NRHP: March 22, 1976

The Gordon-Lee Mansion is located in Chickamauga, Georgia and was originally referred to as the Gordon residence. Construction began in 1840 and was not completed until 1847 due to labor and financial issues. It is listed on the National Register of Historic Places as the Gordon-Lee House and is also known as the Gordon-Lee-Green House. It is individually listed on the National Register, and is also included in the Chickamauga Historic District. The listing includes six contributing buildings including the main house, a slave house, and a smokehouse, and it includes two contributing sites, on 13 acres (5.3 ha).

The house was built by slave labor. Bricks were made on the site.

Just before the Battle of Chickamauga the home was used by the Union army as the headquarters of General Rosecrans. During the battle it was used as a federal hospital for soldiers. The mansion is the only remaining structure from the Battle of Chickamauga. As it stands now the home is owned by the city of Chickamauga and is a national historic site. The Gordon-Lee Mansion has now been turned into a Wedding venue and is open for tours during spring and summer.

== History ==
The mansion property was bought by James Gordon after the removal of the Cherokee in 1836. Mr. James Gordon previously built the Gordon Mill, which served as the first general store in Walker County, Georgia. With the success of the mill, Mr. James Gordon wanted to build a permanent estate. Construction began in 1840, but due to labor and financial problems it was not completed until 1847.

During the American Civil War the home was used as Union headquarters for General William S. Rosecrans, just before the Battle of Chickamauga (September 18–20, 1863). During and after the battle the mansion was turned into a hospital. Wagons were backed up under the windows of the house so the severed limbs of soldiers could be tossed out and disposed of more easily. The floors were so covered in blood that mats had to be put down to hide the stains. Many soldiers wrote their last words upon the walls and the women of the Gordon family would copy the messages down and try to send them to family members of the fallen soldiers.

James Lee bought the house from the Gordon heirs and was married into the family after wedding Elizabeth Gordon. After the death of him and his wife, their son Gordon Lee bought the house. Mr. Gordon Lee completely remodeled the house in the early 1900s and made the double front porch into one with tall pillars, this is the current state of the house.

The mansion stayed in the Gordon family for a hundred and seven years until it was sold to Dr. Green in 1974. It was then that the house and its grounds went under some reconstruction, it now looks very similar to the way it did over a century ago.
