= Bank of Jakin =

- U.S. National Register of Historic Places
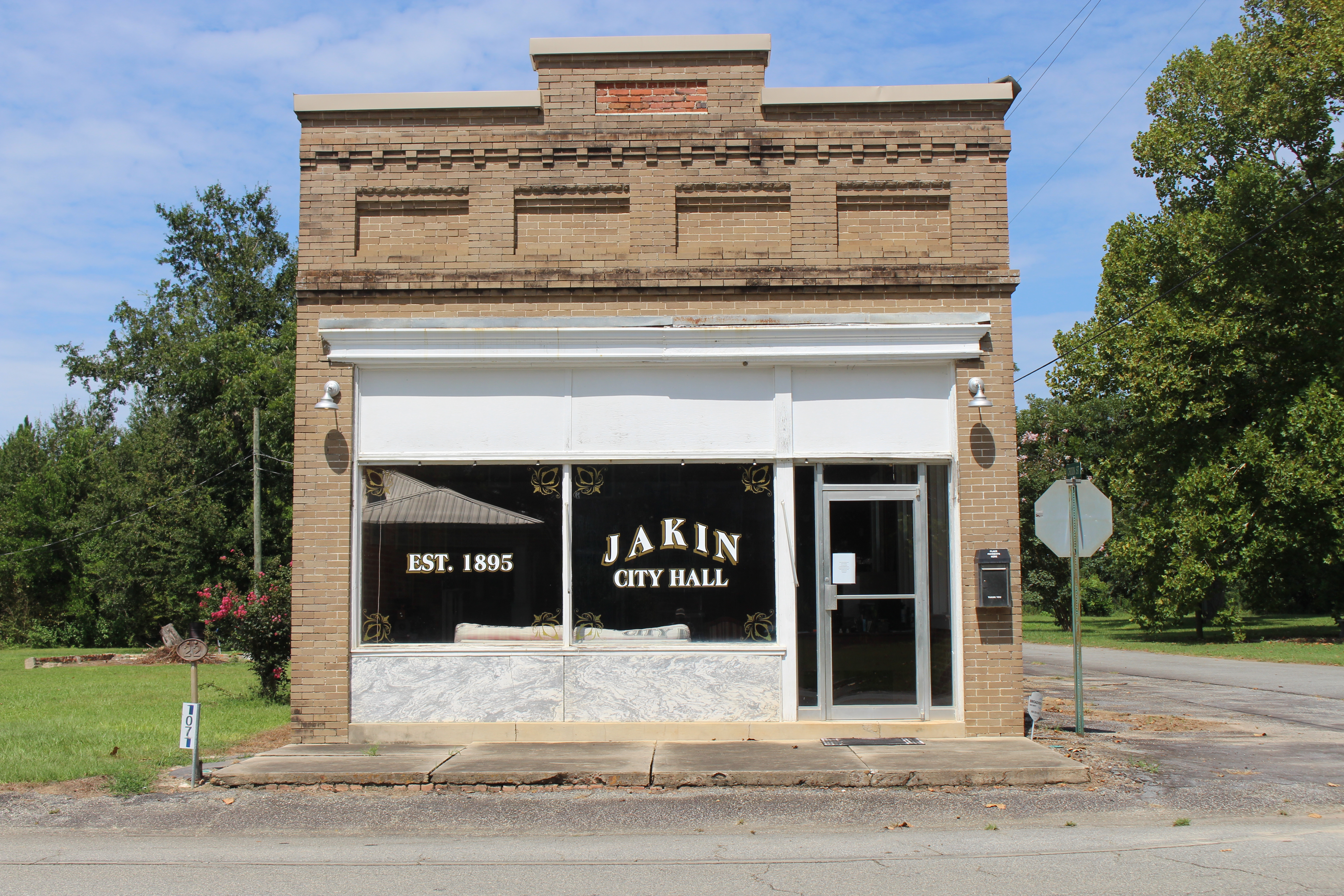
- Old Bank of Jakin

- Location within Georgia Location within the United States
- Location: 135 S. Pearl St., Jakin, Georgia
- Coordinates: 31.08976°N 84.98303°W
- Area: less than one acre
- Built: 1912
- Architectural style: Early Commercial
- NRHP reference No.: 03000678
- Added to NRHP: July 25, 2003

The Bank of Jakin, also known as Jakin Post Office, at 135 S. Pearl St. in Jakin in Early County, Georgia, was built in 1912. It served as the only bank in the town until 1923, then served as the town post office until 1988. It was listed on the National Register of Historic Places in 2003.

It is a one-story brick Early Commercial style building with a flat roof. It has a "stepped parapet roof with corbeled brick and recessed brick panels along the cornice."
