= Cassville, Georgia =

Unincorporated community in Georgia, U.S.

Cassville
- Unincorporated community
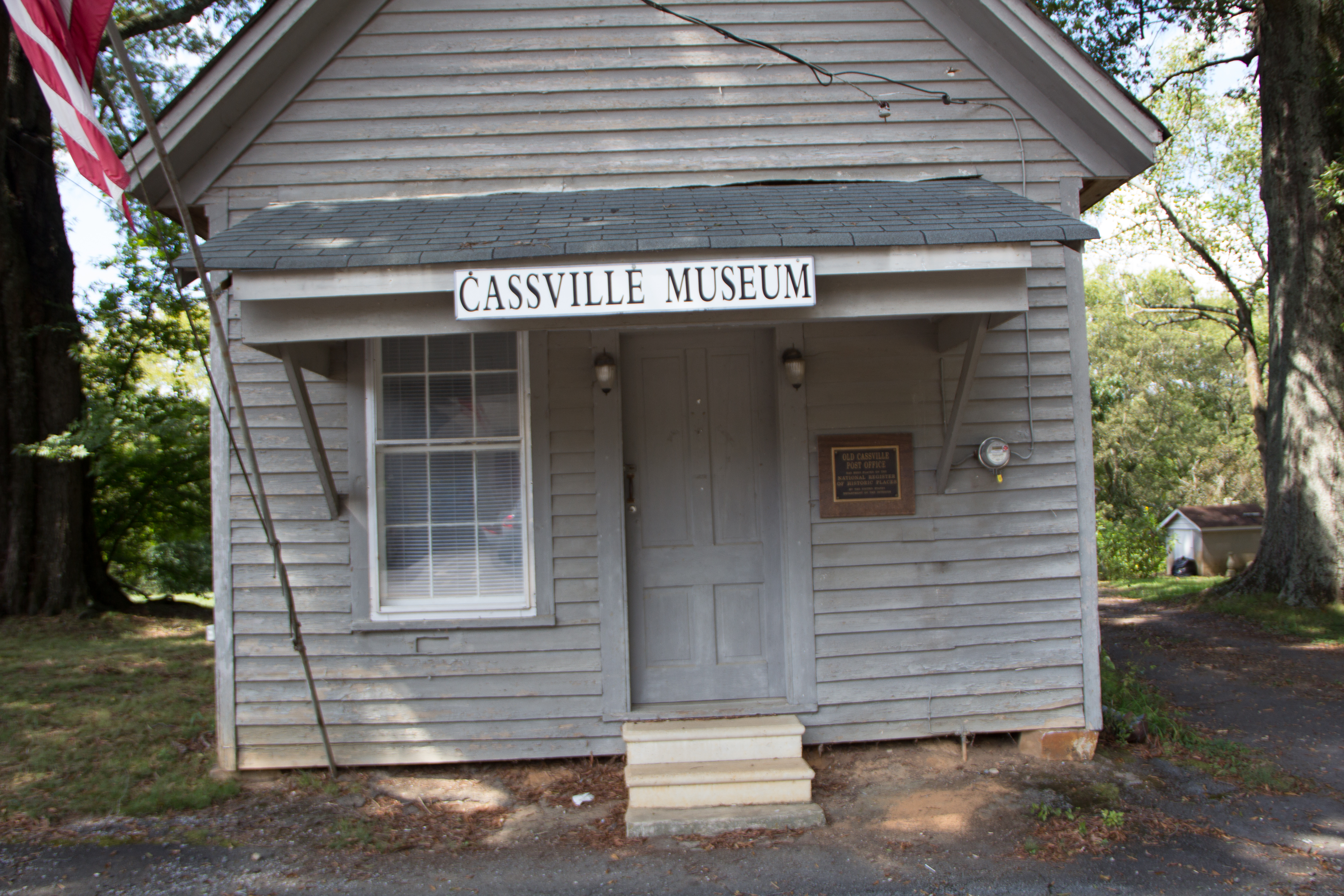
- Cassville Museum

- Location within Georgia
- Coordinates: 34°14′38″N 84°51′10″W
- Country: USA
- State: Georgia
- County: Bartow County
- Platted: 1833
- ZIP code: 30123

Cassville is an unincorporated community in Bartow County in the U.S. state of Georgia. It was originally the county seat before the name was changed from Cass County. The seat was moved to Cartersville after General Sherman destroyed Cassville in his Atlanta campaign of 1864.

Cassville, although no longer incorporated, is said to encompass an area beginning at the Cassville Road-Firetower Road intersection and extending a mile in all directions. Cassville lies in between Adairsville and Cartersville, off U.S. Route 41. It is considered part of metro Atlanta but maintains its small town atmosphere.

Other points of interest include the Cassville History Museum, Cassville Visitors Information, and Cassville Confederate Cemetery, located on Cass-White Road.

== History ==
The town of Cassville was platted in 1833, as the seat of justice for Cass County. It was soon the center of trade and travel in the region recently comprising the Cherokee Nation. Both the county and town were named in the honor of General Lewis Cass, Michigan statesman and Secretary of War in the Cabinet of President Andrew Jackson. It was the county seat of Cass County from 1832 to 1861.

The name was changed to Manassas in 1861 after the success of the Confederacy in the First Battle of Bull Run. But as a direct result, the town was burned by Union General William T. Sherman in 1864 and never fully recovered.

About 300 unknown Confederate soldiers died of wounds or disease in Cassville's several Confederate hospitals. These hospitals operated from late 1861 until May 18, 1864, when ambulances moved patients south out of the path of the invading Federal forces. In May 1899, the Cassville Chapter of the United Daughters of the Confederacy, to honor these unknown soldiers, placed headstones at each of their graves in the local cemetery.

On May 19, 1864, Confederate General Joseph E. Johnston tricked Sherman into dividing his forces at Adairsville and sending the XXIII Corps under General John M. Schofield across the Gravelly Plateau to Cassville. Johnston placed Lt. General Leonidas Polk's corps behind Two Run Creek northwest of Cassville to oppose Schofield in front as he began crossing the creek. Johnston then sent Lt. General John B. Hood's corps northward along the Spring Place Road, to ambush Schofield on the left.

Atlanta campaign

On May 19, 1864, Johnston, entrenched on the ridge east of the marker, planned to give battle but Sherman threatened his flank and his corps commanders objected to the position. He therefore withdrew to Allatoona Pass. Rather than attack this strong position Sherman moved past it toward New Hope Church.

Confederate Army of Tennessee at Cassville

Johnston's forces, reaching Cassville May 18, 1864 from Resaca, 30 miles (48 km) north, took positions on ridge west of the town and prepared to withstand the advancing Federals. On May 19: Pursuant to this intention, Hood's corps moved north of the town to oppose the Federal XX and XXIII Corps marching south from Adairsville. But Hood's corps, diverted by an attack on its right by McCook's cavalry [US], changed front and was ordered with the rest of the Army [CS] to withdraw to ridge east and south of the town.

The Confederates held a council of war at the William Neal McKelvey residence May 19. They discussed the advisability of holding the position east and south of Cassville. Present were: Johnston; Polk; Hood; Maj. General S. C. French; and Captain W.J. Morris, Chief Engineer, Polk's aide-de-camp. After hearing the statements of the council, Johnston ordered the withdrawal of the army at midnight.

On May 19, 1864, Butterfield's (3rd) Division, XXth Corps [US], moving southeast from McDow's, left the road here and marched to the Hawkins Price house, en route to Kingston The 1st and 2nd Divisions (US), on roads west, had the same objective - an erratic move by Sherman who assumed that Johnston's Army (CS])had retreated on Kingston. Butterfield's march disclosed that Johnston's Army was at Cassville, not Kingston. The XXIII Corps (Schofield) [US] marched on this road from McDow's, reaching Cassville at dark.

Here the night of May 19, 1864, the Confederate Generals Johnston, Polk and Hood, conferred and decided to abandon Cassville and to move south of the Etowah, although Johnston originally had intended to fight here.

Cassville Female College was founded in 1853. On May 19, 1864, skirmishers of Polk's Army Corps [CS] withdrew from this ridge east to Cassville when pressed back by Butterfield's (3d) Div., XXth Corps [US], from the Hawkins Price house. Battery C, 1st Ohio Light Artillery, supported by 73rd Ohio Infantry, 19th Michigan Volunteer Infantry Regiment and 20th Connecticut Infantry regiment (US) occupied the ridge and shelled the town as Johnson's Army (CS) withdrew to a ridge east of it. At night Cassville was seized by the 19th Michigan and the 20th Conneticut. The Female College and town were burned by the union.

Noble Hill Rosenwald School, now known as Noble Hill-Wheeler Memorial Center, was built in 1923 as the first standard school for black children in the Bartow County School System. The school closed in 1955 when all the county's schools for black children were consolidated to form Bartow Elementary School at a central location. Today the restored building is a cultural heritage museum with emphasis on black life in Bartow from the early 1900s to the present.

On Chapman Hill, a school for boys was established in January 1854. This was a large three-story brick building flanked by two-story wings. It burned in 1856, was rebuilt in 1857, and was destroyed by Federal forces on October 12, 1864. This, and the Methodist Female College 3/4 miles northeast, were the first chartered institutions of higher education in Cherokee Georgia. Their destruction, together with the burning of Cassville, marked the passing of a notable educational center in this section of the state.

== Notable people ==
- Barry Loudermilk, U.S. Congressman from Georgia's 11th congressional district.
- Brigadier General William T. Wofford is buried here. He surrendered the last remaining Confederate troops east of the Mississippi in nearby Kingston.

== See also ==
- List of county seats in Georgia (U.S. state)
