= Cassville Post Office =

Historic former post office in Georgia, US

- U.S. National Register of Historic Places
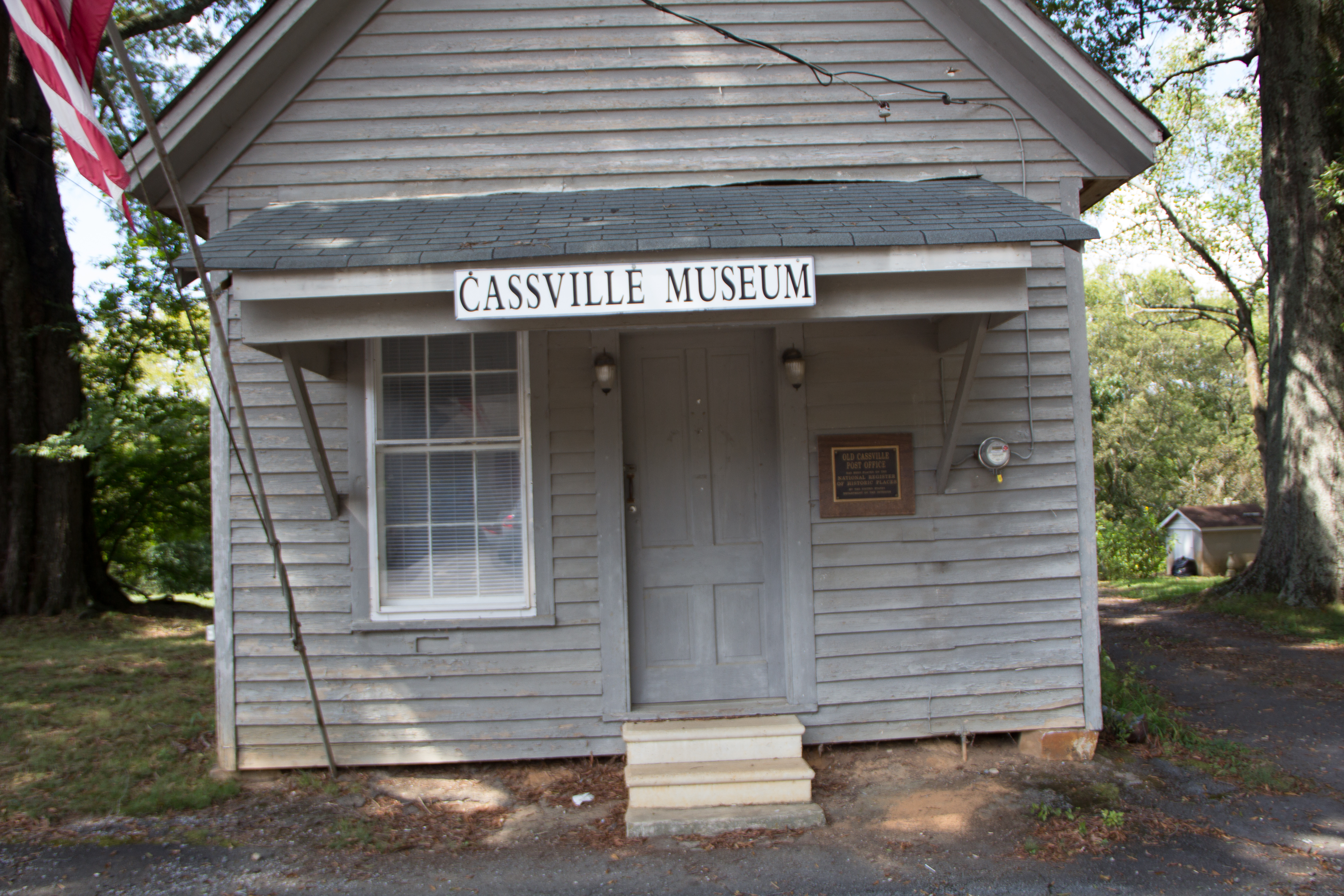
- Museum in 2014

- Location within Georgia
- Location: 1813 Cassville Rd. (Old Dixie Hwy.), Cassville, Georgia
- Coordinates: 34°14′58″N 84°51′10″W
- Area: less than one acre
- Built: 1889
- NRHP reference No.: 92001129
- Added to NRHP: August 31, 1992

The Cassville Post Office, at 1813 Cassville Rd. (Old Dixie Hwy.) in Cassville, Georgia, was built in 1889. It was listed on the National Register of Historic Places in 1992.

It is a gabled, frame one-story building, about 14 by 25 feet (4.3 m × 7.6 m) in plan, built on a field stone foundation. Its front has clapboard siding; its sides and rear have board-and-batten yellow pine siding.

By 2014 it was a museum, the Cassville Museum. The museum, operated by the Cassville Historical Society, has closed.
