= Cavender's Store =

Historic building in the US state of Georgia

- U.S. National Register of Historic Places
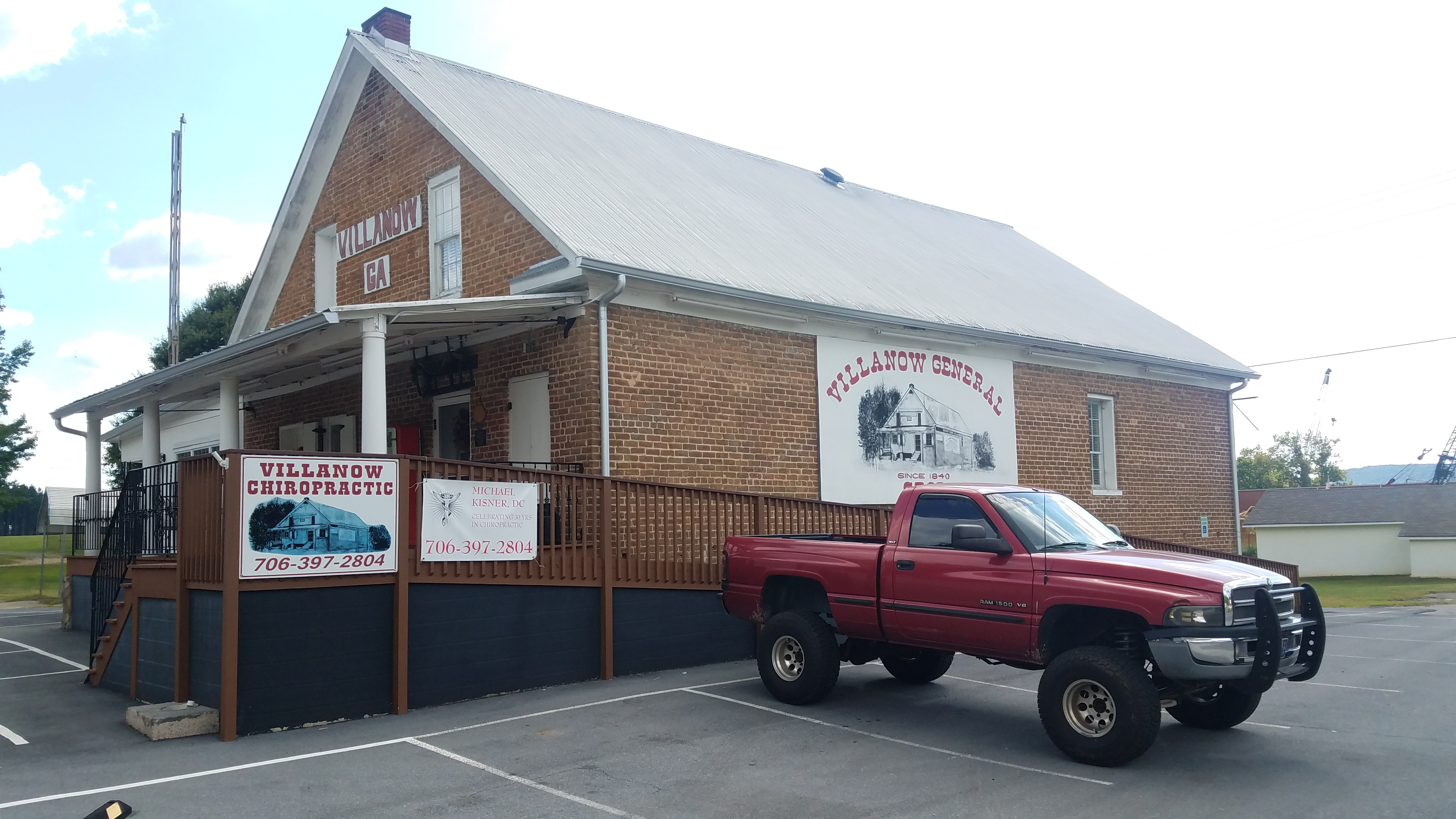

- Location within Georgia Location within the United States
- Location: Jct. of GA 201 and GA 136, SW corner, Villanow, Georgia
- Coordinates: 34°40′25″N 85°6′54″W
- Area: 1.2 acres (0.49 ha)
- Built: c,1840
- NRHP reference No.: 92000143
- Added to NRHP: March 20, 1992

Cavender's Store, which has also been known as Edwards' Store and The Brick, in Villanow, Georgia, is believed to be the oldest freestanding country store in the state of Georgia. It was listed on the National Register of Historic Places in 1992.

It is a one-story front-gabled, brick commercial structure made of hand-made bricks on a rock foundation. Its brick walls are 18 inches (0.46 m) thick, laid in American bond. It has iron tie rods.
