= Peavine Creek (Blackwater River tributary) =

Stream in the American state of Missouri

Coordinates: 38.900015°N 93.550768°W

Peavine Creek is a stream in Johnson and Lafayette Counties in the U.S. state of Missouri. It is a tributary of the Blackwater River.

Peavine Creek was named for the peavines lining its course.

== See also ==
- List of rivers of Missouri
