= Anthony Lane House =

Historic house in Massachusetts, United States

- U.S. National Register of Historic Places
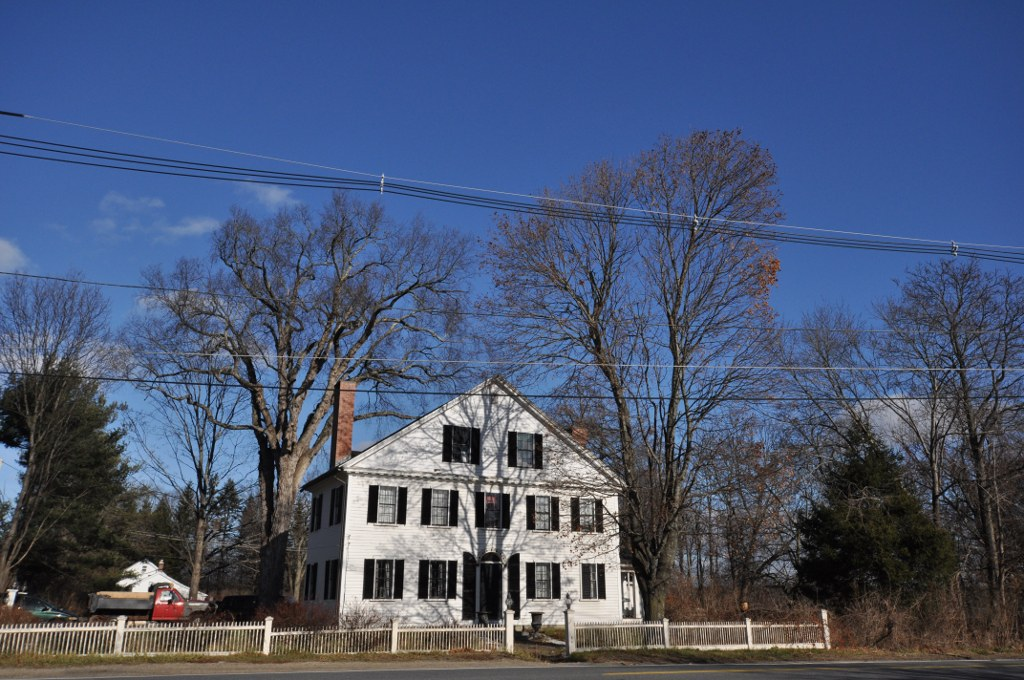

- Location within Massachusetts Location within the United States
- Location: Seven Bridge Road, Lancaster, Massachusetts
- Coordinates: 42°27′54″N 71°39′58″W
- Area: 2 acres (0.81 ha)
- Built: 1809
- Architect: Newhall, Pliny
- Architectural style: Greek Revival, Federal
- NRHP reference No.: 76000300
- Added to NRHP: November 7, 1976

The Anthony Lane House is a historic house at 250 Seven Bridge Road in Lancaster, Massachusetts. Built in 1809, it is one of the town's finest examples of Federal period architecture. It was listed on the National Register of Historic Places in 1976.

== Description and history ==
The Anthony Lane House is located northeast of the town center of Lancaster, at the northeast corner of Seven Bridge Road and Harvard Road. It is a 2 1/2-story wood-frame house, five bays wide and two deep, with a front-facing gable roof, end brick walls, clapboard siding on the front, and interior chimneys on each side. The front gable is fully pedimented, with a modillioned cornice and two small sash windows in the center. Windows are set in rectangular openings with operable shutters, and are arranged symmetrically around the main entrance on the front facade. The front entrance is flanked by pilasters and topped by a half-round transom window. The interior retains many original finishes, most notable finely carved wainscoting in the main parlor.

The house was built in 1809 by Pliny Newhall, a local bricklayer who purchased the land from his employer, whose yard was across the street. He sold the house in 1818 to Captain Anthony Lane, a local farmer who served for several separate terms as town selectman. Architecturally, the house is a harmonious blend of Greek Revival and Federal styles, unusual for the front-facing gable, an uncommon feature in Federal period houses.

== See also ==
- National Register of Historic Places listings in Worcester County, Massachusetts
