= Lane-Towers House =

- U.S. National Register of Historic Places
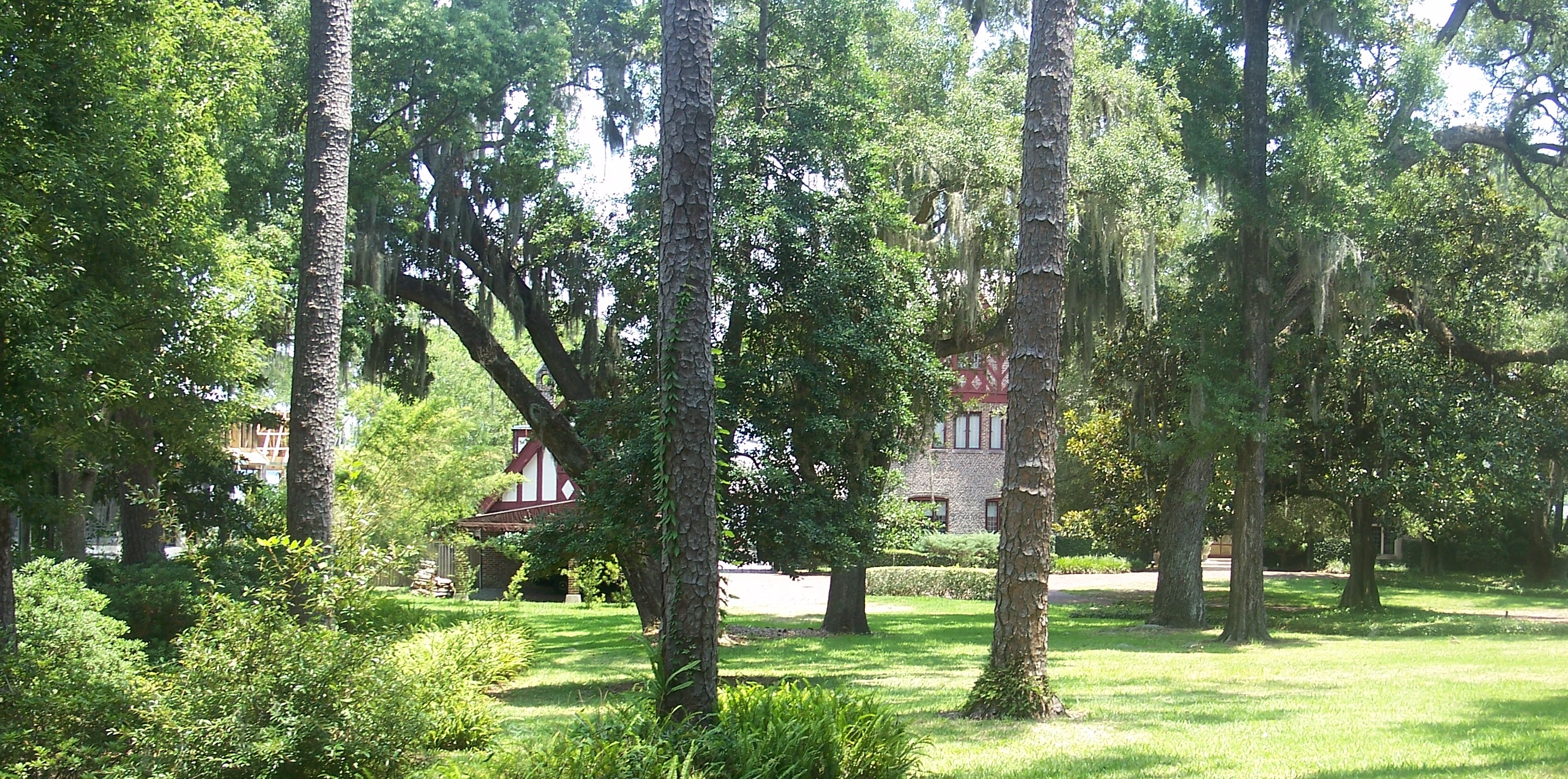

- Location within Florida Location within the United States
- Location: Jacksonville, Florida, USA
- Coordinates: 30°17′29″N 81°42′17″W
- Area: Avondale Riverside
- Architect: Original: William M. Marsh, Harold Saxelbe
- Architectural style: Tudor Revival
- NRHP reference No.: 82001035
- Added to NRHP: November 10, 1982

The Lane-Towers House is a historic home in Jacksonville, Florida. It is located at 3730 Richmond Street. On November 10, 1982, it was added to the U.S. National Register of Historic Places.
