= John Ross House (Rossville, Georgia) =

Historic house in Georgia, United States

- U.S. National Register of Historic Places
- U.S. National Historic Landmark
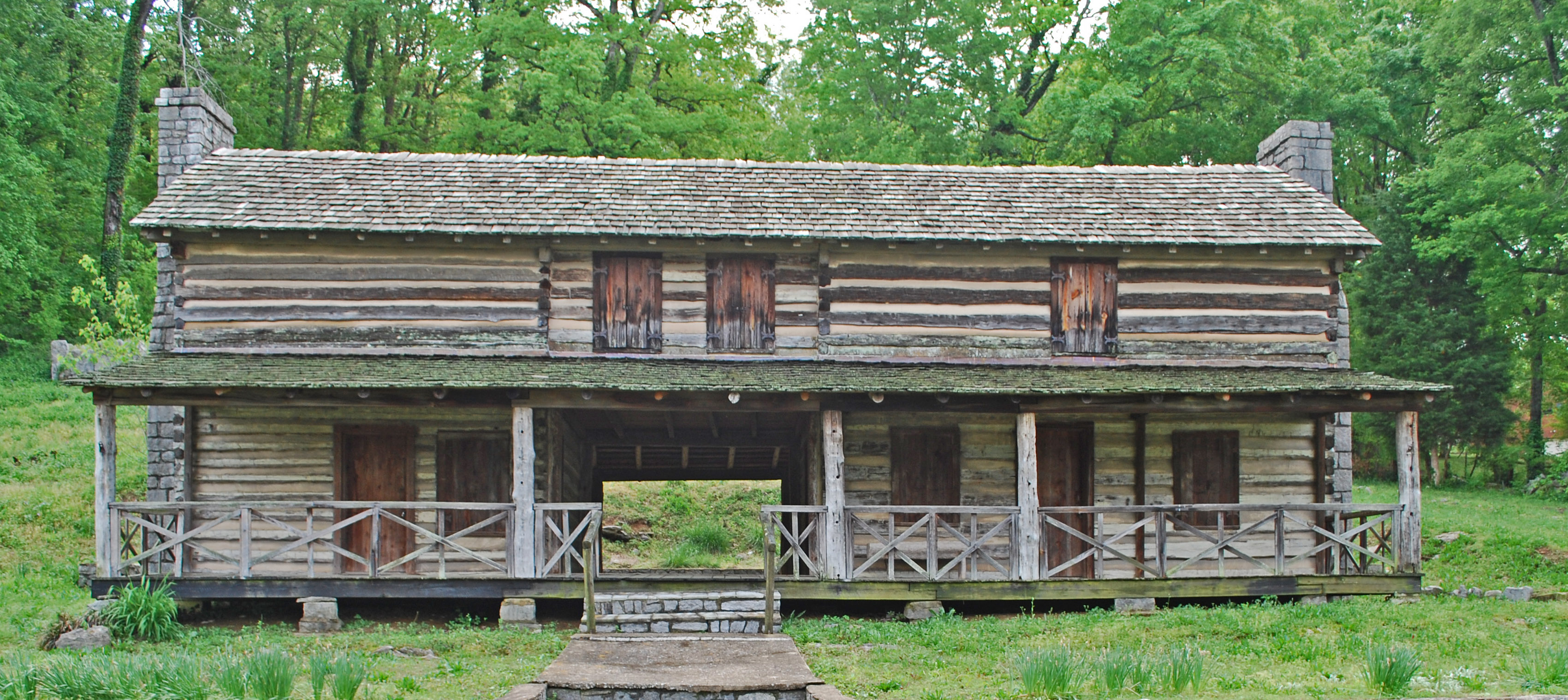

- Location within Georgia Location within the United States
- Location: Lake Ave. and Spring St., Rossville, Georgia
- Coordinates: 34.9811°N 85.2848°W
- Area: 5 acres (2.0 ha)
- Built: 1797
- Architect: John McDonald
- Architectural style: Log house
- NRHP reference No.: 73000647

Significant dates
- Added to NRHP: November 7, 1973
- Designated NHL: November 7, 1973

The John Ross House is a historic house at Lake Avenue and Spring Street in Rossville, Georgia. It was the home of the long-serving Cherokee Nation leader John Ross from 1830 to 1838, after his lands and fine home near the Coosa River had been taken by the state. Ross (1790-1866) led the Cherokee for many years, notably opposing the Cherokee Removal, which he was unable to stop. His house was declared a National Historic Landmark in 1973.

== Description and history ==
The John Ross House is located near Rossville's downtown, on the south side of a lane joining Andrew Street and East Lake Avenue. Its location is not original; it was moved a short distance, from a more central downtown location, in the 1960s. The house is a two-story log structure with a dogtrot plan, consisting of two log pens flanking a first-floor breezeway, all covered by a low-pitch wood shingle gable roof. The logs are chinked with modern cement. The left pen measures 16 by 16 feet (4.9 m × 4.9 m), and contains one room, as does the larger right pen, which measures 16 by 23 feet (4.9 m × 7.0 m). A single-story log-rail porch extends across the front facade.

According to legend, the house was built near Missionary Ridge in 1797 by John McDonald, a Scots immigrant to the area who had married a Cherokee woman. Dendrochronology dating, however, suggests that the house was built in 1816–1817, likely by John Ross. The entire area was at the time Cherokee land. McDonald's grandson, John Ross, inherited the land where the house was built in 1809 from his uncle, William Shorey. John Ross became chief of the Cherokee in 1828, leading a political faction within the tribe that opposed state and federal taking of the Cherokee lands, and of the Cherokee Removal. Ross was dispossessed of his own home by the state's takeover of those lands in 1830, and moved into the house of his grandfather, living there until 1838. Ross was a leading figure in the adoption of the Cherokee Constitution of 1827, and represented the tribe in its unsuccessful legal efforts to retain its lands.

The city of Rossville, chartered in 1905, is named for John Ross. The Ross House is one of the oldest in the area, having survived the American Civil War, in which it was used as a hospital by both sides. The Chief John Ross House Association was formed in the 1950s to preserve the house, which had fallen into disrepair and was becoming surrounded by commercial development. It was moved in the 1960s to its present parklike setting.

== Images ==
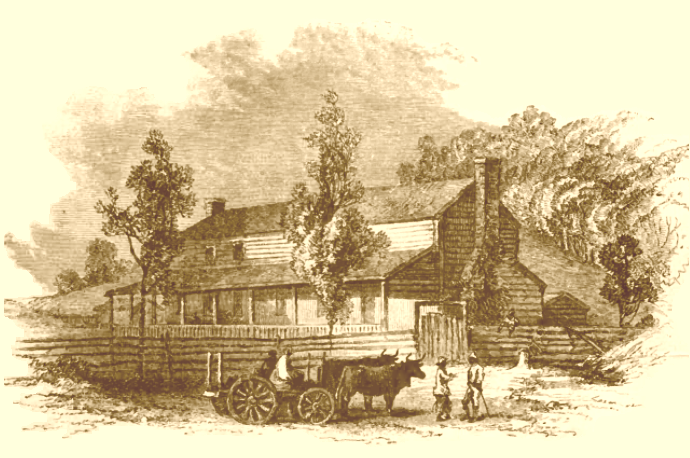

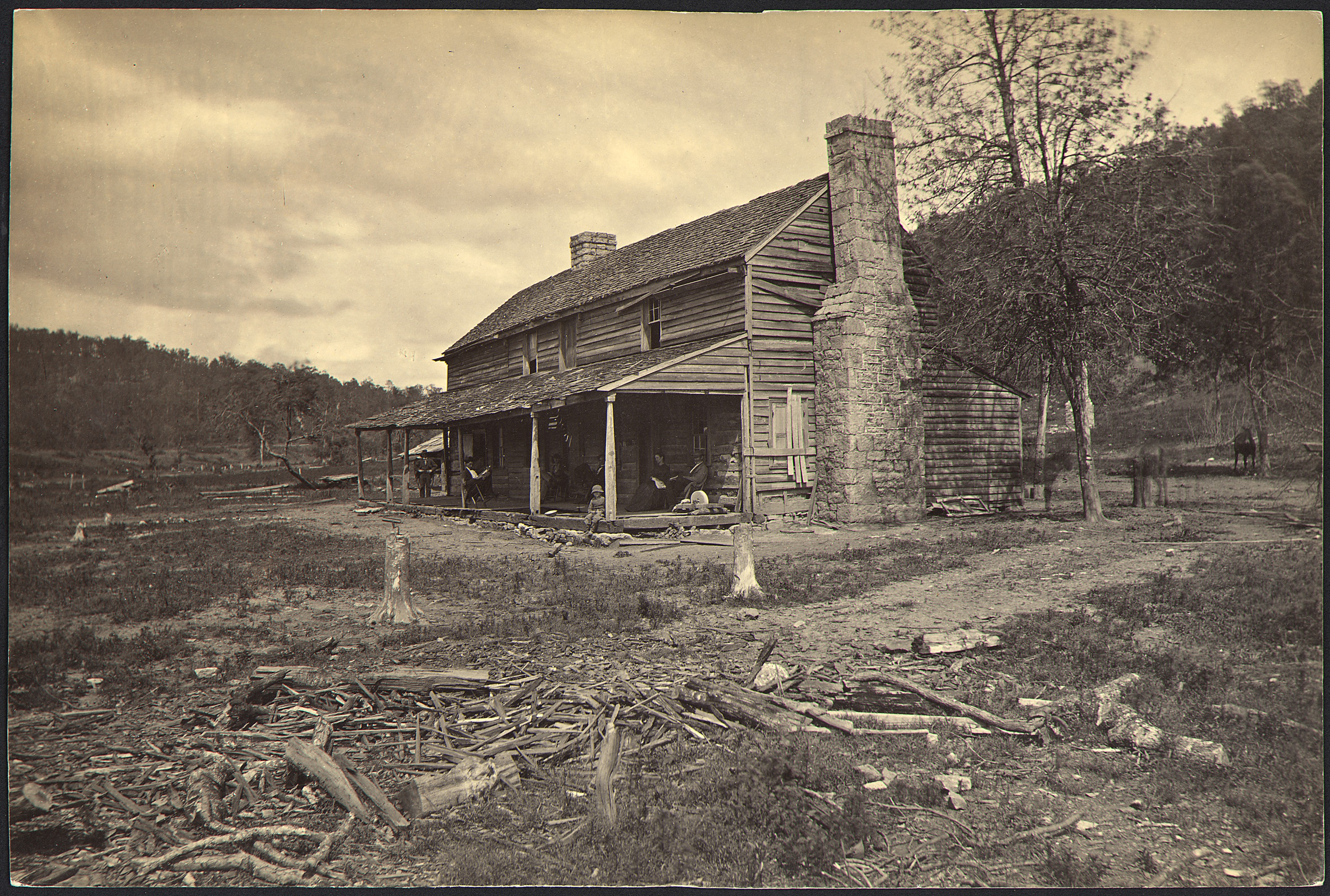

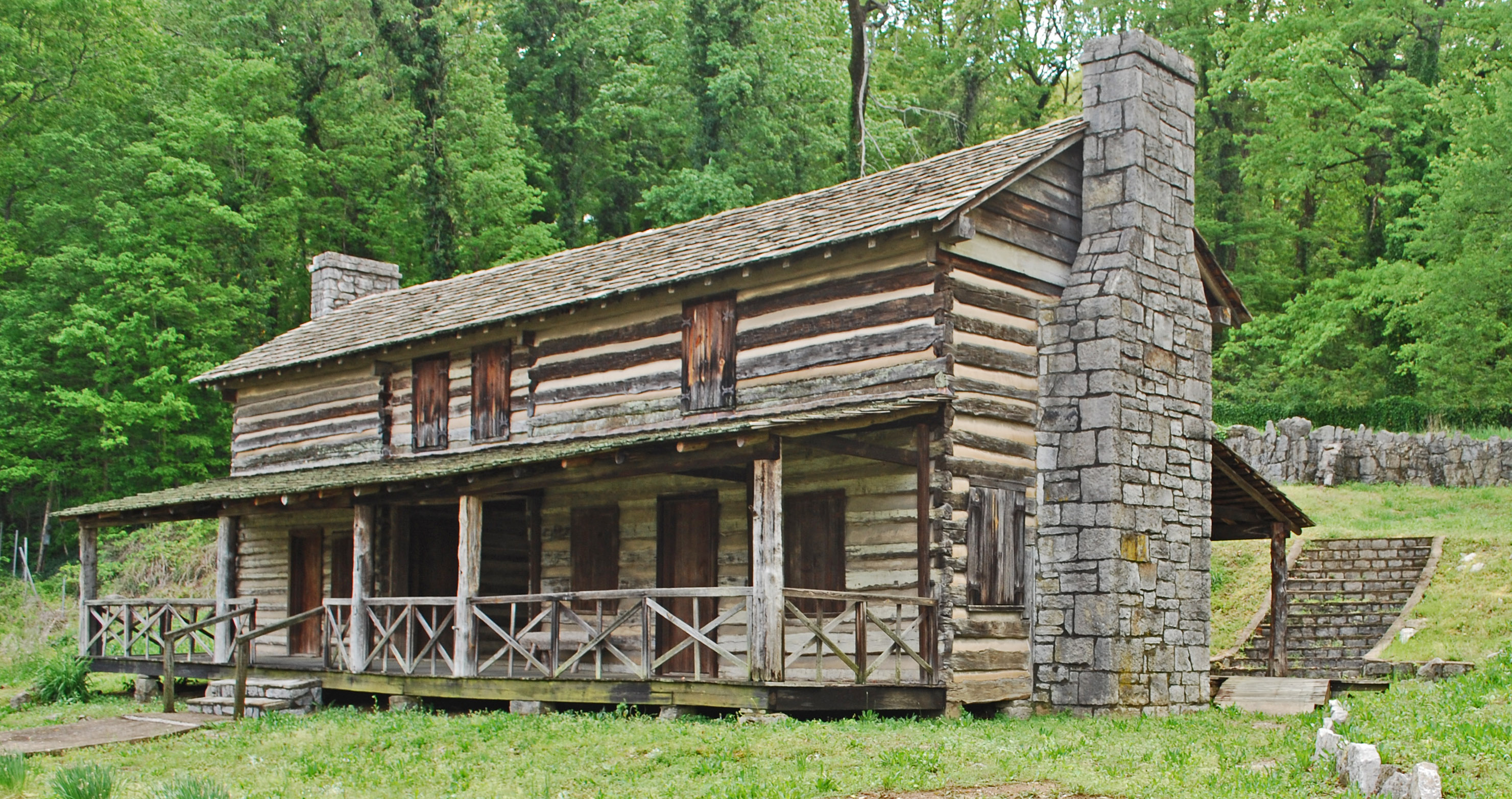

== See also ==
- List of National Historic Landmarks in Georgia (U.S. state)
- National Register of Historic Places listings in Walker County, Georgia
