= United States Post Office-Baxley, Georgia =

Historic post office in Georgia, US

- United States Post Office--Baxley, Georgia
- U.S. National Register of Historic Places
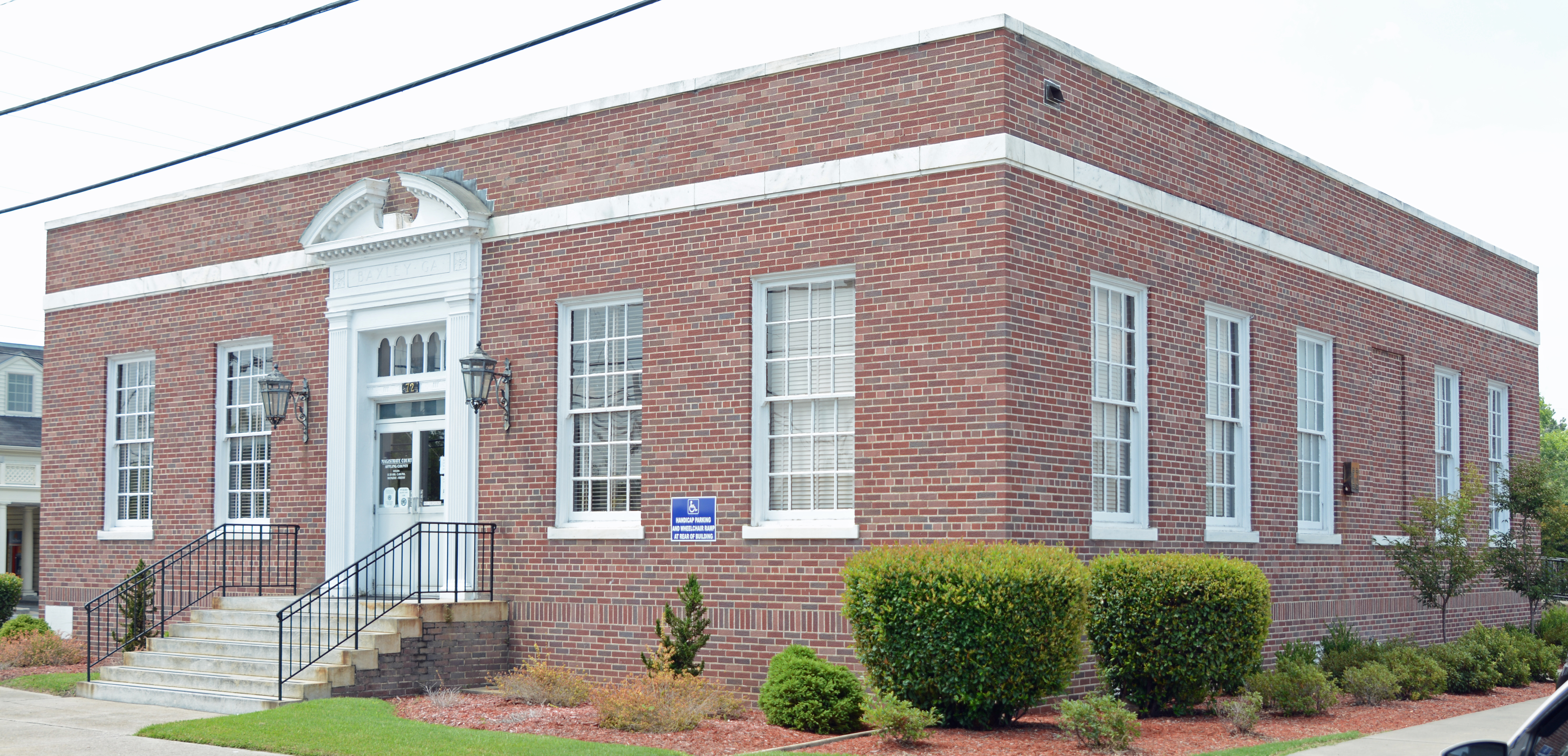

- Location within Georgia Location within the United States
- Location: 124 Tippins St., Baxley, Georgia
- Coordinates: 31°46′41″N 82°21′0″W
- Area: 0.3 acres (0.12 ha)
- Built: 1935-1936
- Architect: Louis A. Simon; et.al.
- Architectural style: Colonial Revival
- NRHP reference No.: 00000755
- Added to NRHP: July 5, 2000

The United States Post Office-Baxley, Georgia on Tippins Street in Baxley in Appling County, Georgia is a Colonial Revival-style post office built in 1935–1936. It was listed on the National Register of Historic Places in 2000.

It is a small one-story post office which is "similar in size, scale, materials, and architectural style to many of the other approximately sixty-five post offices built in Georgia" during the 1930s. It is one of the "vast majority of post offices built in Georgia during this period [which] were designed in the Colonial Revival style."

It is now used for the magistrate court.
