= Lane House (Kensington, Georgia) =

Historic house in Georgia, United States

- U.S. National Register of Historic Places
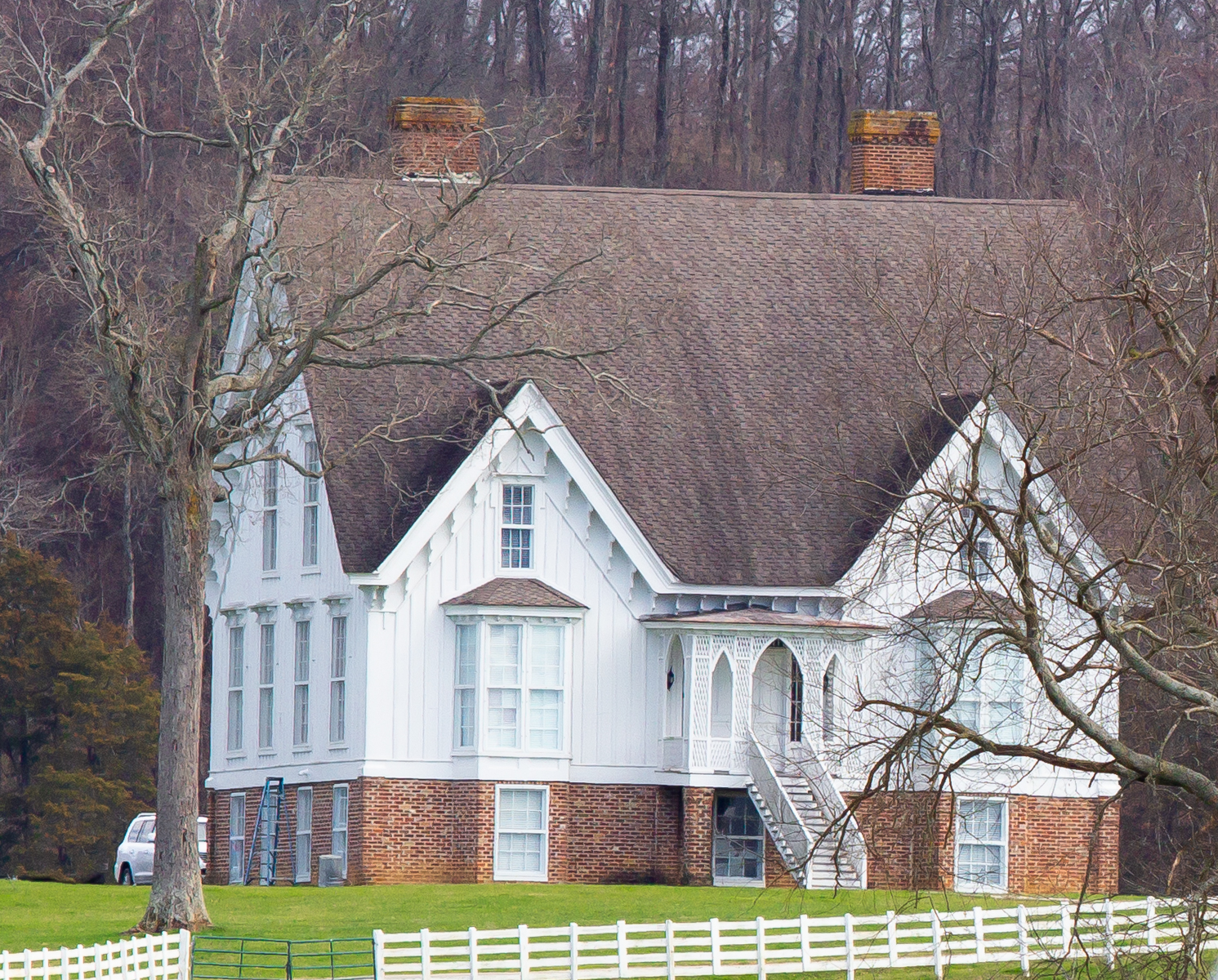

- Location within Georgia Location within the United States
- Nearest city: Kensington, Georgia
- Coordinates: 34°46′43″N 85°20′24″W
- Area: 230 acres (93 ha)
- Built: c.1855-1859
- Architectural style: Gothic, Carpenter Gothic
- NRHP reference No.: 76000655
- Added to NRHP: December 12, 1976

The Lane House, also known as the Richard Lane House, near Kensington, Georgia is listed on the National Register of Historic Places.

It is a Gothic Revival-style house built c.1855-1859.

It is also a contributing building in the McLemore Cove Historic District.
