= Peavine Creek (Chickamauga Creek tributary) =

Stream in the state of Georgia

Coordinates: 34°58′49″N 85°09′54″W

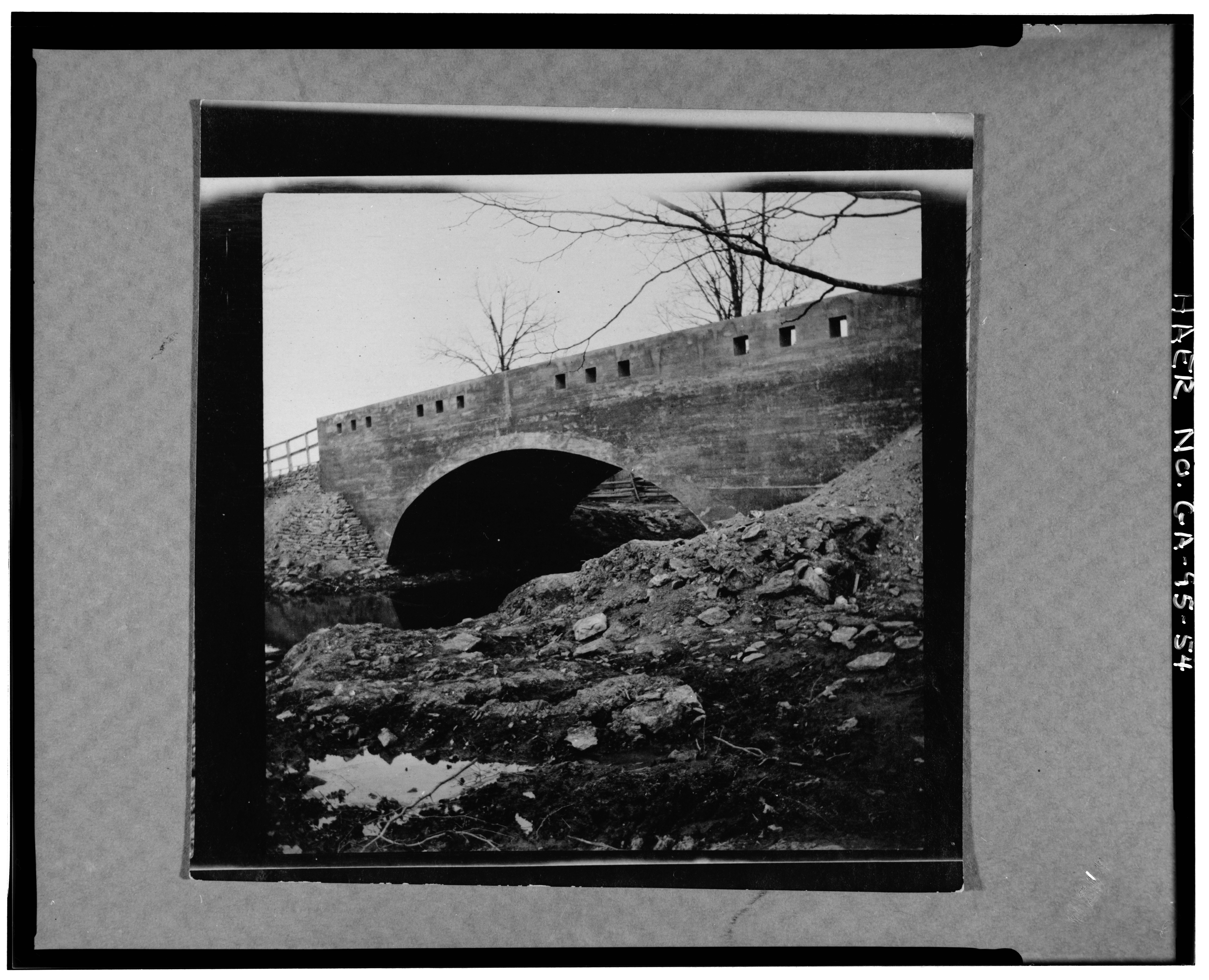
Peavine Creek Bridge

Peavine Creek is a stream in Catoosa County and Walker County, Georgia, United States. It is a tributary of Chickamauga Creek.

Peavine Creek was named from the fact wild pea vines are native to the region.

== See also ==
- List of rivers of Georgia (U.S. state)
