= Rossville, Georgia =

- City
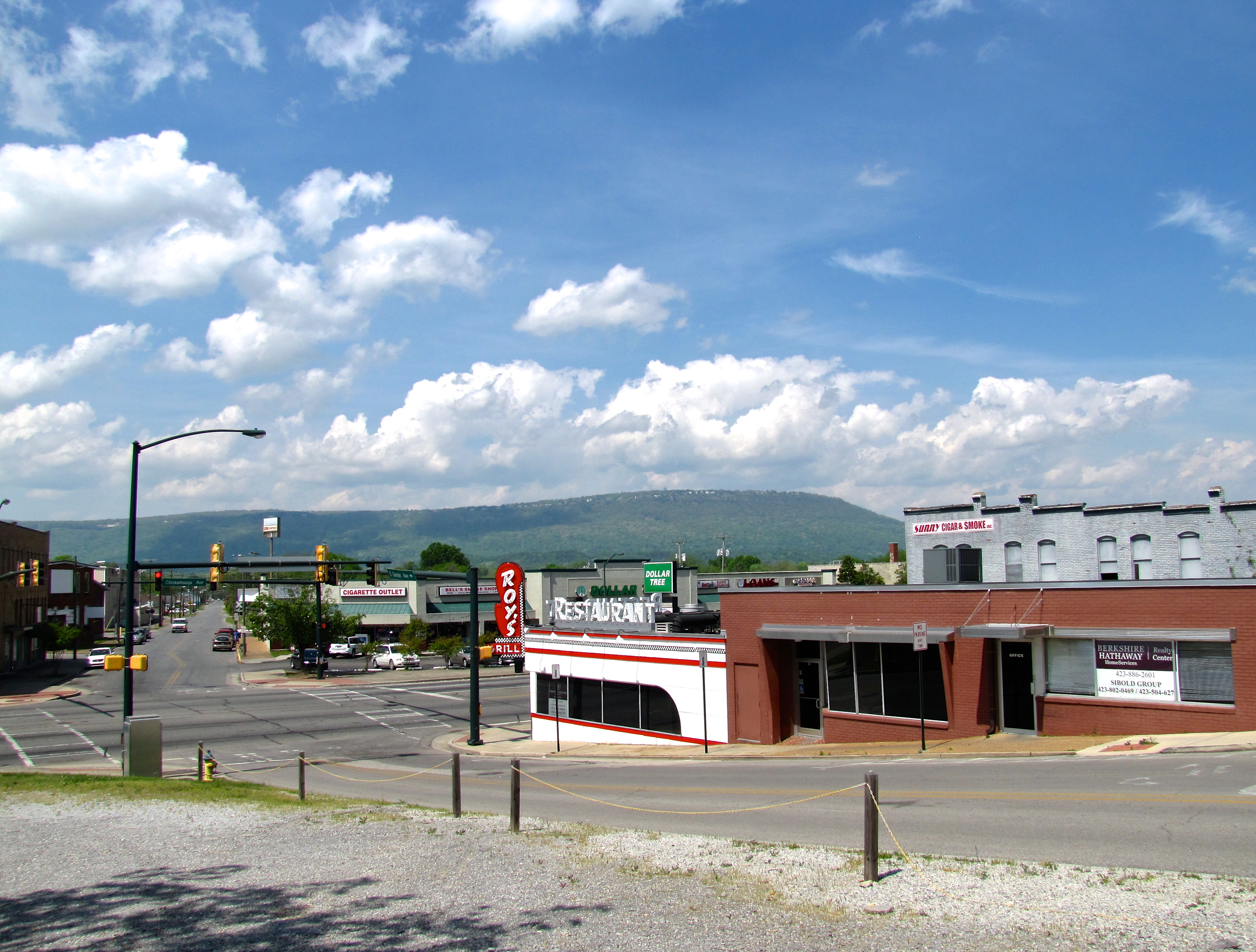
- Businesses in Downtown Rossville

- Flag Seal

- Location in Walker County and the state of Georgia
- Coordinates: 34°58′35″N 85°17′28″W
- Country: United States
- State: Georgia
- County: Walker

Government
  - Vice Mayor: Jonathan Lassetter
  - Council: Jarret Lassetter
  - Council: Todd Franklin
  - Council: Erica Harris

Area
  - Total: 1.81 sq mi (4.68 km^{2})
  - Land: 1.81 sq mi (4.68 km^{2})
  - Water: 0.0039 sq mi (0.01 km^{2})
- Elevation: 699 ft (213 m)

Population (2020)
  - Total: 3,980
  - Density: 2,203.7/sq mi (850.87/km^{2})
- Time zone: UTC-5 (Eastern (EST))
  - Summer (DST): UTC-4 (EDT)
- ZIP code: 30741
- Area codes: 706/762, 423
- FIPS code: 13-67256
- GNIS feature ID: 0332928
- Website: www.rossvillega.gov

Rossville is a city in Walker County, Georgia, United States. The population was 3,980 at the 2020 census. It is part of the Chattanooga metropolitan area.

== History ==
A post office has been in operation at Rossville since 1817. The city was named after Cherokee Indian Chief John Ross, who resided there until being forced to relocate with his people to Oklahoma on the Trail of Tears. The city incorporated in 1905.

The John Ross House, a log cabin, was declared a National Historic Landmark in 1973.

== Geography ==
According to the United States Census Bureau, the city has a total area of 1.8 square miles (4.7 km^{2}), all land.

Rossville is a suburb of Chattanooga, Tennessee, and the cities are separated by the Tennessee/Georgia state line. The city lies in a broad valley between Missionary Ridge to the east and Lookout Mountain to the west. Fort Oglethorpe and the Chickamauga and Chattanooga National Military Park lie across Missionary Ridge to the southeast. U.S. Route 27 connects Rossville to Chattanooga and Fort Oglethorpe.

== Demographics ==
Historical population
Census	Pop.	Note	%±
1910	1,059		—
1920	1,427		34.7%
1930	3,230		126.3%
1940	3,538		9.5%
1950	3,892		10.0%
1960	4,665		19.9%
1970	3,957		−15.2%
1980	3,849		−2.7%
1990	3,601		−6.4%
2000	3,511		−2.5%
2010	4,105		16.9%
2020	3,980		−3.0%
U.S. Decennial Census; 1850-1870 1870-1880; 1890-1910 1920-1930; 1940 1950 1960; 1970 1980 1990; 2000

=== 2020 census ===
As of the 2020 census, Rossville had a population of 3,980. The median age was 37.9 years. 23.7% of residents were under the age of 18 and 17.7% were 65 years of age or older. For every 100 females, there were 89.5 males, and for every 100 females age 18 and over there were 85.1 males age 18 and over.

100.0% of residents lived in urban areas, while 0.0% lived in rural areas.

There were 1,630 households and 1,051 families in Rossville, of which 30.8% had children under the age of 18 living in them. Among family households, 33.9% were married-couple households, 22.6% were households with a male householder and no spouse or partner present, and 35.3% were households with a female householder and no spouse or partner present. About 32.6% of all households were made up of individuals, and 13.2% had someone living alone who was 65 years of age or older.

There were 1,872 housing units, of which 12.9% were vacant. The homeowner vacancy rate was 3.3% and the rental vacancy rate was 9.7%.

Rossville racial composition
Race	Num.	Perc.
White (non-Hispanic)	3,006	75.53%
Black or African American (non-Hispanic)	532	13.37%
Native American	18	0.45%
Asian	17	0.43%
Pacific Islander	3	0.08%
Other/mixed	179	4.5%
Hispanic or Latino	225	5.65%

=== 2010 census ===
As of the census of 2010, there were 4,105 people, 1,507 households, and 955 families residing in the city. The population density was 1,945.7 inhabitants per square mile (751.2/km^{2}). There were 1,693 housing units at an average density of 938.2 per square mile (362.2/km^{2}). The racial makeup of the city was 93.51% White, 3.90% African American, 0.57% Native American, 0.34% Asian, 0.48% from other races, and 1.20% from two or more races. Hispanic or Latino people of any race were 1.28% of the population.

There were 1,507 households, out of which 29.6% had children under the age of 18 living with them, 39.9% were married couples living together, 19.0% had a female householder with no husband present, and 36.6% were non-families. 32.6% of all households were made up of individuals, and 16.4% had someone living alone who was 65 years of age or older. The average household size was 2.26 and the average family size was 2.85.

In the city, the population was spread out, with 24.6% under the age of 18, 8.9% from 18 to 24, 26.7% from 25 to 44, 19.4% from 45 to 64, and 20.4% who were 65 years of age or older. The median age was 37 years. For every 100 females, there were 80.1 males. For every 100 females age 18 and over, there were 74.5 males.

The median income for a household in the city was $23,612, and the median income for a family was $29,423. Males had a median income of $26,346 versus $21,875 for females. The per capita income for the city was $14,175. About 16.6% of families and 20.3% of the population were below the poverty line, including 30.0% of those under age 18 and 14.7% of those age 65 or over.

== Notable people ==
- Lauren Alaina - country singer
- Kane Brown - country singer
- Bob Burcham - racing driver
- Terry Gordy - professional wrestler
- Ashley Harkleroad - professional tennis player
- Martin Scott - politician, member of Georgia House of Representatives

== See also ==
- Ross's Landing
