= Chickamauga, Georgia =

- City
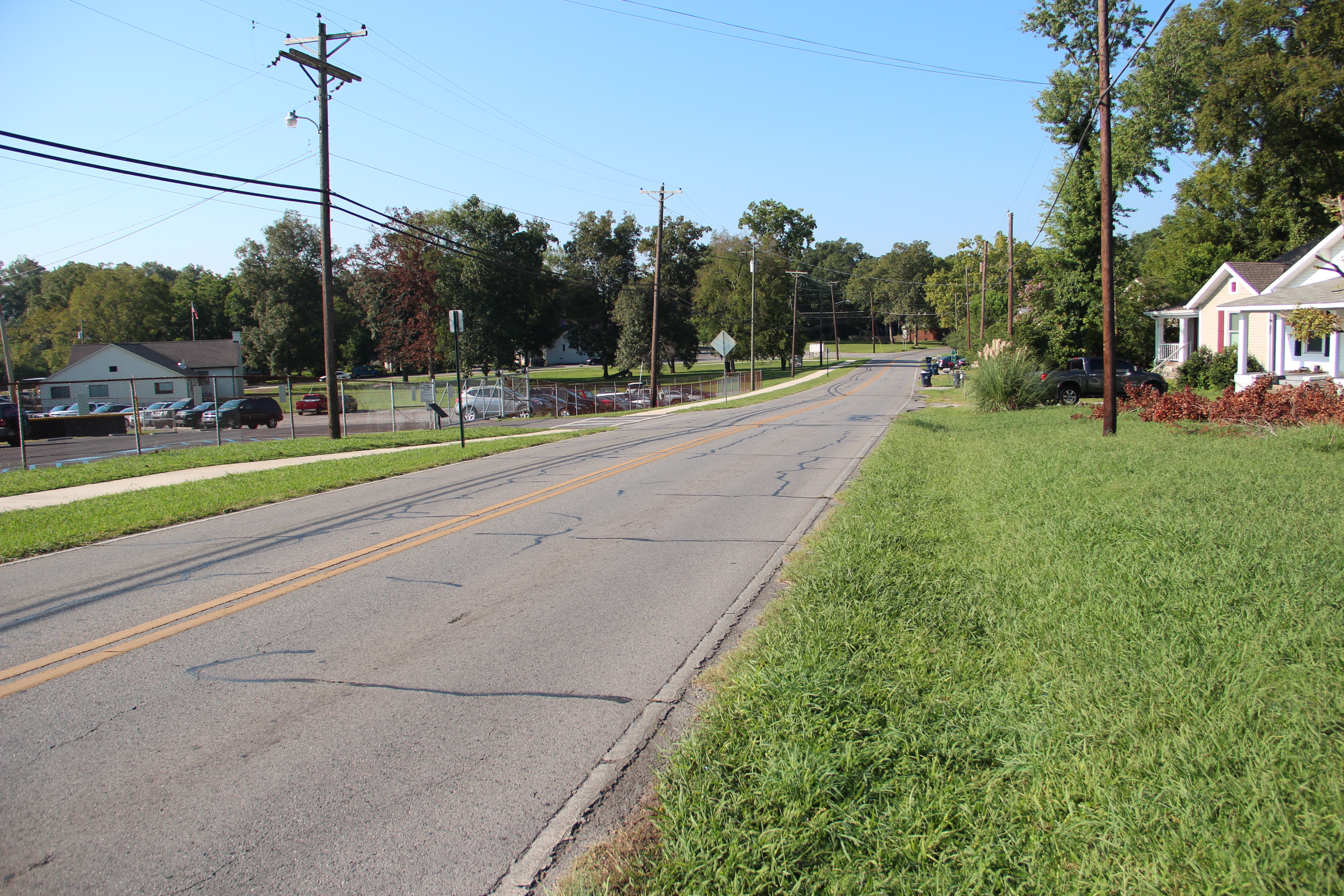
- Georgia State Route 341 in Chickamauga

- Flag Seal

- Location in Walker County and the state of Georgia
- Coordinates: 34°52′29″N 85°17′34″W
- Country: United States
- State: Georgia
- County: Walker

Government
  - Mayor: Trey Deck

Area
  - Total: 2.86 sq mi (7.41 km^{2})
  - Land: 2.85 sq mi (7.38 km^{2})
  - Water: 0.012 sq mi (0.03 km^{2})
- Elevation: 732 ft (223 m)

Population (2020)
  - Total: 2,917
  - Density: 1,024.1/sq mi (395.42/km^{2})
- Time zone: UTC-5 (EST)
  - Summer (DST): UTC-4 (EDT)
- ZIP code: 30707
- Area codes: 706/762
- FIPS code: 13-15984
- GNIS feature ID: 0355145
- Website: cityofchickamauga.org

Chickamauga is a city in Walker County, Georgia, United States. The population was 2,917 at the 2020 census. It is part of the Chattanooga metropolitan area.

== History ==
Before the 1800s, the Chickamauga Cherokee settled around Chickamauga Creek, where they farmed and hunted the lands. They stayed there until their forced exodus during the Trail of Tears (1838). In the early to mid-19th century, the present town of Chickamauga was a large plantation in the rolling hills of northern Georgia. When the Cherokee Nation was divided into districts and courts in 1820, Crawfish Springs was made the capital of the new Chickamauga District. After the Cherokee removal, the first court in Walker County was held there in the former Cherokee courthouse. The local post office was Crawfish Springs.

During the War of 1812, 500 Cherokee warriors from the area fought alongside General Andrew Jackson at the Battle of Horseshoe Bend, against the Creek Indians, who were aligned with the United Kingdom of Great Britain and Ireland. The battle ended in a victory for the U.S. Army.

The Lee and Gordon families greatly influenced Chickamauga's post-Cherokee history. In 1836 Gwinnett County native James Gordon established a plantation at Crawfish Springs and built a grist mill two miles east of town, on Chickamauga Creek. Lee and Gordon's Mill, which contained the area's first general store, was situated near a blacksmith shop and stagecoach stop. From 1840 to 1847, Gordon built his Doric-columned brick house (known today as the Gordon-Lee Mansion), which overlooks Crawfish Springs.

The area was settled by many other farm families and life was busy and fruitful in the fertile valleys, until even this remote part of the South was visited by the sounds of cannon and guns during the American Civil War. The Battle of Chickamauga, named for nearby Chickamauga Creek, was fought on September 19–20, 1863. It involved more than 150,000 soldiers from the Union and Confederate armies. Before the battle, Union Gen. William Rosecrans put his headquarters at the Gordon Lee Mansion. During the battle, wounded and injured soldiers were cared for in the home and nearby buildings. Many Union doctors remained behind to care for their patients after the Southern victory. Parched soldiers of both sides drank from the town's namesake springs.

Crawfish Springs was the site of an 1889 reunion of veteran soldiers, Northern and Southern, who had fought in the Battle of Chickamauga. Called the "Blue and Gray Barbecue", hundreds of soldiers and their families visited the sites of the bloody battle over 25 years before, smoking the pipe of peace, healing the wounds, and helping start the Chickamauga National Park. The Chickamauga Battlefield, established in 1890, is just north of the City of Chickamauga, and is a part of the Chickamauga and Chattanooga National Military Park, the first and largest in the country.

In 1888, a railroad line was built through Crawfish Springs. A syndicate bought the land and used some of it to develop a summer resort, complete with the Park Hotel, which opened in 1891. Around this same time, the Central of Georgia Railway built a stone depot for visitors to the hotel (both the tracks and depot remain today). After passenger service ceased in the 1950s, the city schools, library system, and recreation department used the depot. It now houses the Walker County Regional Heritage and Model Train Museum. Occasional tourist train excursions stop at the Chickamauga depot. The Durham Iron and Coal Company built coke ovens on Chickamauga's north side, used to transform coal into coke for iron and steel foundries in Chattanooga. Beginning in 1891, coal was transported by train twice daily from Lookout Mountain to Chickamauga. Production peaked in 1904, at about 700 to 1,000 tons of coal per day, and ended entirely during the Great Depression. These coke ovens were restored in the 1990s for exhibition.

In the early 20th century, Chickamauga became a textile-mill town. New England native Daniel Ashley Jewell, who had moved to middle Georgia prior to the Civil War, built a cotton mill. The small community in central Georgia that grew up around his mill is still called Jewell. His sister subsequently married a Colonel W.L.L. Bowen. Jewell and his brother-in-law reorganized the bag company and it became the Bowen-Jewell Bag Company. Soon after, Colonel Bowen's nephew, A. S. Bowen, joined the company as a salesman.

The company's best customers were the large grain mills in east Tennessee. For this reason, it was determined to move the company to Chattanooga in 1905. D.A. Jewell and business partner Colonel Bowen bought land in Chickamauga in 1907 from US Senator Gordon Lee. The men had heard that Lee, the owner of the springs, was proud of his sharp business dealings and had sold Crystal Spring several times, only to repossess it as soon as the first payment was missed. Jewell and Bowen dressed themselves in their worst clothes and tried to look like a less than affluent rural men. They approached Lee and discussed buying the land. When a price had been quoted, they told Lee to have his attorney draw up the papers and they would return to work out the terms of purchase. When they came back, they were wearing their normal clothes and had their attorney with them. Rather than seeking terms, they paid in cash, and Lee had no choice but to relinquish the property.

Jewell and Bowen also built the Crystal Springs Bleachery Company (in 1909). The Crystal Springs Bleachery Company was a major local employer and a significant player in the development of the town. The mill remained in operation until 2013. Other notable manufacturers have interests in Chickamauga such as Shaw Industries.

Over the last century, the city has changed and grown, from a population of 95 (in 1900) to 3,101 (in the 2010 official Census). The city is surrounded by the north Georgia mountains and valleys, and the history of the area has been rediscovered and restored wherever possible. Today Chickamauga is host to a wide variety of antique, boutique and specialty shops, cafes and restaurants. Within a few blocks of the main shopping district are public parks and historic sites, including Crawfish Springs Park, Coke Oven Park, and Holland-Watson Veterans Memorial Park. From April to September the Tennessee Valley Railroad Museum offers weekend train excursions from Chattanooga to Chickamauga.

When the city was incorporated in 1891, the city's north–south avenues were named for Confederate generals. Today avenues named for Longstreet, Hood, Crittenden, Stewart, and more are clearly marked by large, wood framed signs displaying a description of the General's accomplishments, his picture, and flags of the day.

Several major Civil War battle sites and museums are near the city: Chickamauga & Chattanooga National Military Park, Lookout Mountain, Lee & Gordon's Mill, McLemore's Cove, and the Martin-Davis House, on the site of the Battle of Davis's Cross Roads.

== Geography ==
Chickamauga is located at 34°52′29″N 85°17′34″W (34.874696, −85.292751). According to the United States Census Bureau, the city has a total area of 1.8 square miles (4.7 km^{2}), of which 1.8 square miles (4.7 km^{2}) is land and 0.55% is water.

=== Climate ===
Chickamuga has a humid subtropical climate (Köppen climate classification Cfa), with cool to mild winters and hot, humid summers. Rainfall is abundant and highest in the winter and spring months, with an average of 57 inches (1,449 mm).

Climate data for Chickamauga (2 miles SW), Georgia (1991-2020 normals, extremes 1892–present)
Month	Jan	Feb	Mar	Apr	May	Jun	Jul	Aug	Sep	Oct	Nov	Dec	Year
Record high °F (°C)	78 (26)	82 (28)	88 (31)	93 (34)	98 (37)	103 (39)	106 (41)	105 (41)	104 (40)	97 (36)	88 (31)	81 (27)	106 (41)
Mean daily maximum °F (°C)	50.7 (10.4)	54.9 (12.7)	63.8 (17.7)	72.8 (22.7)	79.8 (26.6)	86.1 (30.1)	88.9 (31.6)	88.5 (31.4)	83.5 (28.6)	73.2 (22.9)	62.0 (16.7)	53.2 (11.8)	71.5 (21.9)
Mean daily minimum °F (°C)	32.9 (0.5)	35.5 (1.9)	41.7 (5.4)	48.9 (9.4)	57.5 (14.2)	66.1 (18.9)	69.6 (20.9)	68.9 (20.5)	63.2 (17.3)	51.2 (10.7)	40.7 (4.8)	35.8 (2.1)	51.0 (10.5)
Record low °F (°C)	−13 (−25)	−6 (−21)	8 (−13)	22 (−6)	30 (−1)	37 (3)	41 (5)	44 (7)	29 (−2)	19 (−7)	2 (−17)	−2 (−19)	−13 (−25)
Average rainfall inches (mm)	5.34 (136)	5.29 (134)	5.60 (142)	5.15 (131)	4.44 (113)	4.28 (109)	4.52 (115)	3.66 (93)	4.44 (113)	3.25 (83)	5.13 (130)	5.90 (150)	57 (1,449)
Average snowfall inches (cm)	0.3 (0.76)	0.5 (1.3)	1.2 (3.0)	0 (0)	0 (0)	0 (0)	0 (0)	0 (0)	0 (0)	0 (0)	0 (0)	0.1 (0.25)	2.1 (5.31)
Source: NOAA

== Education ==
=== Chickamauga City Schools ===
Chickamauga City Schools is a public, tax-funded institution that is open to all students who live within the city limits. Students who live outside the city may also attend, but must pay tuition since they do not contribute tax dollars to the school. The school district holds Kindergarten to grade twelve, and consists of an elementary school, middle school and high school. The district has 68 full-time teachers and over 1,293 students.

=== Walker County Schools ===
The Walker County Schools, for those not in the city limits, holds pre-school to grade twelve, and consists of nine elementary schools, four middle schools, and two high schools. The district has 577 full-time teachers and over 8,844 students.

=== Other schools ===
==== Walker County Alternative Education Center ====
The Alternative Education Center in Walker County is located in the former Osburn Elementary School. When Cherokee Ridge Elementary was built, the students from Osburn were transferred to the new facility and the Alternative Education program was moved into the still-usable Osburn.

==== Oakwood Christian Academy ====
The Oakwood Baptist Church founded a private Christian-based academy in 1992. Currently the school offers grades Pre-K through 12th, with over 275 students enrolled. It sponsors sports teams such as cheerleading and basketball. It was announced in December 2008 that by 2012 Oakwood Academy will grow to include a high school.

== Culture and tourism ==
=== Tourist attractions ===
Lee and Gordon's Mills, one of the oldest mills in the state of Georgia, is located about two miles east of the center of town on the west bank of the Chickamauga Creek.

The Walker County Regional Heritage and Model Train Museum is housed in the stone train depot building. The museum exhibits Civil War collectibles, Indian artifacts and Cherokee arrowheads, World War I artifacts, antique guns and furniture and a complete working display of Lionel Old Gauge model trains that date back to 1947.

The Chickamauga coke ovens are located just north of downtown Chickamauga on Highway 341. The beehive ovens of the Durham Iron and Coal Company were designed to turn coal into coke for use in the iron and steel foundries in nearby Chattanooga, Tennessee.

The Gordon Lee Mansion was originally the Gordon residence built by James Gordon, who began construction in 1840 and completed in 1847. The mansion and surrounding buildings are now used as a bed and breakfast as well as a restaurant and banquet center.

Crawfish Spring, the main water supply for the early settlements, and later for the city of Chickamauga in the early to mid-20th century, is located on Cove Road just south of the main town and across the road from the Gordon Lee Mansion. The spring is no longer used as a water supply and has been converted into a park setting with picnic tables, a swing, and a gazebo.

The Holland-Watson Veterans' Park was dedicated on May 27, 2002. It is named after two Chickamauga soldiers, Sgt. Eddie H. Holland and Cpl. Thomas A. "Tommy" Watson, who lost their lives during Vietnam. A Huey helicopter is mounted on a pedestal in the center of the walking track as a symbol of the war and those who fought and died for their country.

== Notable people ==
- Ashley Harkleroad, former professional tennis player
- Steve Tarvin, member of the Georgia House of Representatives

== Demographics ==
Historical population
Census	Pop.	Note	%±
1900	95		—
1910	312		228.4%
1920	965		209.3%
1930	1,715		77.7%
1940	1,665		−2.9%
1950	1,747		4.9%
1960	1,824		4.4%
1970	1,842		1.0%
1980	2,232		21.2%
1990	2,149		−3.7%
2000	2,245		4.5%
2010	3,101		38.1%
2020	2,917		−5.9%
U.S. Decennial Census; 1850-1870 1870-1880; 1890-1910 1920-1930; 1940 1950 1960; 1970 1980 1990; 2000

=== 2020 census ===
As of the 2020 census, Chickamauga had a population of 2,917, with 1,145 households and 735 families residing in the city.

The median age was 41.0 years. 25.1% of residents were under the age of 18 and 17.6% of residents were 65 years of age or older. For every 100 females there were 94.2 males, and for every 100 females age 18 and over there were 86.5 males age 18 and over.

96.1% of residents lived in urban areas, while 3.9% lived in rural areas.

Of the city's households, 34.4% had children under the age of 18 living in them. 52.8% were married-couple households, 13.3% had a male householder and no spouse or partner present, and 30.1% had a female householder and no spouse or partner present. About 26.0% of all households were made up of individuals, and 12.6% had someone living alone who was 65 years of age or older.

There were 1,255 housing units, of which 8.8% were vacant. The homeowner vacancy rate was 1.8% and the rental vacancy rate was 6.5%.

Chickamauga racial composition
Race	Num.	Perc.
White (non-Hispanic)	2,699	92.53%
Black or African American (non-Hispanic)	23	0.79%
Native American	7	0.24%
Asian	21	0.72%
Other/Mixed	125	4.29%
Hispanic or Latino	42	1.44%

=== 2010 census ===
At the 2010 census, there were 3,101 people, 1,198 households, and 844 families residing in the city. The population density was 1,206.6 inhabitants per square mile (465.9/km^{2}). There were 1,354 housing units at an average density of 526.8 per square mile (203.4/km^{2}). The racial makeup of the city was 2,974 (95.9%) white, 22 (0.71%) black, 4 (0.13%) Native American, 18 (0.58%) Asian, 16 (0.52%) from other races, and 67 (2.16%) from two or more races. 35 (1.13%) of the population was Hispanic or Latino.

There were 1,198 households, out of which 464 (38.73%) had children under the age of 18 living with them, 627 (52.34%) were married couples living together, 162 (13.52%) had a female householder with no husband present, 62 (5.18%) were unmarried opposite-sex couples, 8 (0.67%) were unmarried same-sex couples, and 354 (29.55%) were non-families. 309 (25.79%) of all households were made up of individuals, and 136 (11.35%) had someone living alone who was 65 years of age or older. The average household size was 2.59, and the average family size was 3.09.

In the city, the population was spread out, with 828 (26.7%) under the age of 18, 278 (8.96%) aged 18 to 24, 783 (25.25%) aged 25 to 44, 792 (25.54%) aged 45 to 64, and 420 (13.5%) who were 65 years of age or older. The median age was 37.2 years. For every 100 females, there were 93.9 males.

=== 2000 census ===
As of the census of 2000, there were 2,245 people, 899 households, and 644 families residing in the city. The population density was 1,238.8 inhabitants per square mile (478.3/km^{2}). There were 951 housing units at an average density of 524.8 per square mile (202.6/km^{2}). The racial makeup of the city was 98.35% White, 0.58% African American, 0.27% Native American, 0.22% Asian, 0.22% from other races, and 0.36% from two or more races. Hispanic or Latino of any race were 0.40% of the population.

There were 899 households, out of which 34.9% had children under the age of 18 living with them, 56.2% were married couples living together, 11.0% had a female householder with no husband present, and 28.3% were non-families. 25.1% of all households were made up of individuals, and 10.8% had someone living alone who was 65 years of age or older. The average household size was 2.50 and the average family size was 3.00.

In the city, the population was spread out, with 26.0% under the age of 18, 9.3% from 18 to 24, 29.4% from 25 to 44, 22.0% from 45 to 64, and 13.4% who were 65 years of age or older. The median age was 37 years. For every 100 females, there were 96.8 males. For every 100 females age 18 and over, there were 90.8 males.

The median income for a household in the city was $40,110, and the median income for a family was $46,037. Males had a median income of $31,447 versus $21,776 for females. The per capita income for the city was $17,716. About 5.6% of families and 8.0% of the population were below the poverty line, including 6.8% of those under age 18 and 11.2% of those age 65 or over.
