= Broad Street Historic District =

Broad Street Historic District and variations with Commercial, Residential, North, South, East and West may refer to several places in the United States:

== Arkansas ==
- East Broad Street Historic District (Texarkana, Arkansas), listed on the National Register of Historic Places (NRHP)

== Connecticut ==
- Naubuc Avenue-Broad Street Historic District, East Hartford, NRHP-listed
- Broad Street – Davis Park Historic District, Killingly, NRHP-listed
- Broad Street Historic District (Middletown, Connecticut), NRHP-listed
- Broad Street Green Historic District, Windsor, NRHP-listed

== Georgia ==
- Broad Street Historic District (Augusta, Georgia), NRHP-listed
- South Street–Broad Street–Main Street–Laurel Street Historic District, Greensboro, NRHP-listed in Greene County
- Broad Street Historic District (LaGrange, Georgia), NRHP-listed
- North Broad Street Historic District (Monroe, Georgia), NRHP-listed
- South Broad Street Historic District (Monroe, Georgia), NRHP-listed
- South Broad Street Historic District (Rome, Georgia), NRHP-listed
- Broad Street Commercial Historic District (Winder, Georgia), NRHP-listed in Barrow County
- North Broad Street Residential Historic District, Winder, NRHP-listed

== Maine ==
- Broad Street Historic District (Bethel, Maine), NRHP-listed

== Michigan ==
- Bridge Street-Broad Street Historic District, Linden, NRHP-listed

== Mississippi ==
- Broad Street–Church Street Historic District, Columbia, NRHP-listed in Marion County

== New Jersey ==
- North Broad Street Historic District (Newark, New Jersey), NRHP-listed in Essex County
- Broad Street Historic District (Woodbury, New Jersey), listed on the New Jersey Register of Historic Places

== New York ==
- North Broad Street Historic District (Norwich, New York), NRHP-listed
- Broad Street–Water Street Historic District, Lyons, NRHP-listed

== North Carolina ==
- South Broad Street Row, Mooresville, NRHP-listed
- East Broad Street–Davie Avenue Historic District, Statesville, NRHP-listed

== Ohio ==
- East Broad Street Historic District (Columbus, Ohio), NRHP-listed

== Pennsylvania ==
- Broad Street Historic District (Philadelphia), NRHP-listed
- North Broad Street Mansion District, Philadelphia, NRHP-listed

== South Carolina ==
- West Broad Street Historic District (Darlington, South Carolina), NRHP-listed

== Virginia ==
- Broad Street Commercial Historic District (Richmond, Virginia), NRHP-listed
- West Broad Street Commercial Historic District, Richmond, NRHP-listed

== See also ==
- Broad Street (ward), a historic district that is one of the 25 wards of London, England
- Broad Street (disambiguation)
