= National Register of Historic Places listings in Walton County, Georgia =

Map of Georgia with Walton County highlighted

This is a list of properties and districts in Walton County, Georgia that are listed on the National Register of Historic Places (NRHP).

This National Park Service list is complete through NPS recent listings posted March 21, 2025.

== Current listings ==
	Name on the Register	Image	Date listed	Location	City or town	Description
1	Bank of Jersey	Bank of Jersey	March 7, 1984 (#84001269)	Main St. 33°43′01″N 83°47′59″W	Jersey	
2	A. J. Boss House		December 28, 1983 (#83003609)	324 Edwards St. 33°47′54″N 83°42′34″W	Monroe	
3	Samuel H. Brodnax House		June 17, 1982 (#82002496)	GA 81; 33°44′26″N 83°51′08″W	Walnut Grove	
4	Tom Chick House		December 28, 1983 (#83003610)	1102 E. Church St. 33°47′23″N 83°41′40″W	Monroe	
5	Davis-Edwards House	Davis-Edwards House	August 14, 1973 (#73000648)	238 N. Broad St. 33°47′50″N 83°42′48″W	Monroe	
6	East Church Street Historic District		December 28, 1983 (#83003612)	E. Church St. and S. Madison Ave. 33°47′30″N 83°42′23″W	Monroe	
7	East Marable Street Historic District		December 28, 1983 (#83003613)	E. Marable St. 33°48′11″N 83°42′49″W	Monroe	
8	William Harris Family Farmstead	William Harris Family Farmstead	June 22, 1982 (#82002494)	GA 11; 33°53′38″N 83°43′23″W	Campton	
9	Walter Jones Rock House	Walter Jones Rock House	November 4, 1993 (#93001190)	4435 GA 186 NE; 33°47′48″N 83°33′02″W	Good Hope	
10	McDaniel Street Historic District		December 28, 1983 (#83003614)	S. Broad and McDaniel Sts. 33°47′27″N 83°42′56″W	Monroe	
11	McDaniel-Tichenor House	McDaniel-Tichenor House	February 8, 1980 (#80001255)	319 McDaniel St. 33°47′24″N 83°42′55″W	Monroe	
12	Monland Place Historic District		December 28, 1983 (#83003616)	Alvoca St. and Blvd. 33°47′15″N 83°42′51″W	Monroe	
13	Monroe and Walton Mills Historic District		December 28, 1983 (#83003617)	S. Broad St., S. Madison Ave., and Georgia RR line 33°47′05″N 83°42′33″W	Monroe	
14	Monroe City Hall	Monroe City Hall	December 28, 1983 (#83003618)	227 S. Broad St. 33°47′33″N 83°42′45″W	Monroe	
15	Monroe Commercial Historic District	Monroe Commercial Historic District	December 28, 1983 (#83003619)	Spring and Broad Sts. 33°47′40″N 83°42′46″W	Monroe	
16	North Broad Street Historic District		December 28, 1983 (#83003623)	N. Broad and Walton Sts. 33°47′50″N 83°42′54″W	Monroe	
17	Social Circle Historic District		March 27, 1980 (#80001257)	GA 11 and GA 229; 33°39′19″N 83°43′08″W	Social Circle	
18	South Broad Street Historic District		December 28, 1983 (#83003620)	S. Broad St. 33°47′20″N 83°42′40″W	Monroe	
19	South Madison Avenue-Pannell Road Historic District		December 28, 1983 (#83003621)	S. Madison Ave. and Pannell Rd. 33°46′35″N 83°42′00″W	Monroe	
20	James Berrien Upshaw House	James Berrien Upshaw House	March 6, 1986 (#86000414)	US 78/GA 11; 33°49′02″N 83°48′28″W	Between	
21	Walton County Courthouse	Walton County Courthouse	September 18, 1980 (#80001256)	Courthouse Sq. 33°47′40″N 83°42′45″W	Monroe	
22	Walton County Jail	Walton County Jail	December 28, 1983 (#83003624)	203 Milledge Ave. 33°47′37″N 83°42′33″W	Monroe	
23	Walton Hotel		July 15, 1982 (#82002495)	Broad and Court Sts. 33°47′38″N 83°42′47″W	Monroe	
24	Williamson House	Williamson House	December 28, 1983 (#83003625)	925 E. Church St. 33°47′34″N 83°41′54″W	Monroe	

== Former listings ==
	Name on the Register	Image	Date listed	Date removed	Location	City or town	Description
1	Casulon Plantation	Casulon Plantation	October 10, 1975 (#75000615)	January 16, 2020	E of Good Hope off GA 186; 33°47′45″N 83°31′40″W	Good Hope	

== See also ==
- National Register of Historic Places listings in Georgia (U.S. state)
