= National Register of Historic Places listings in Georgia =

There are more than 2,000 properties and districts in Georgia that are listed on the United States National Register of Historic Places, distributed among all of the state's 159 counties.

Listings for the city of Atlanta are primarily in Fulton County's list but spill over into DeKalb County's list.

This National Park Service list is complete through NPS recent listings posted November 6, 2026.

== Listings by county ==
NRHP count and density by county

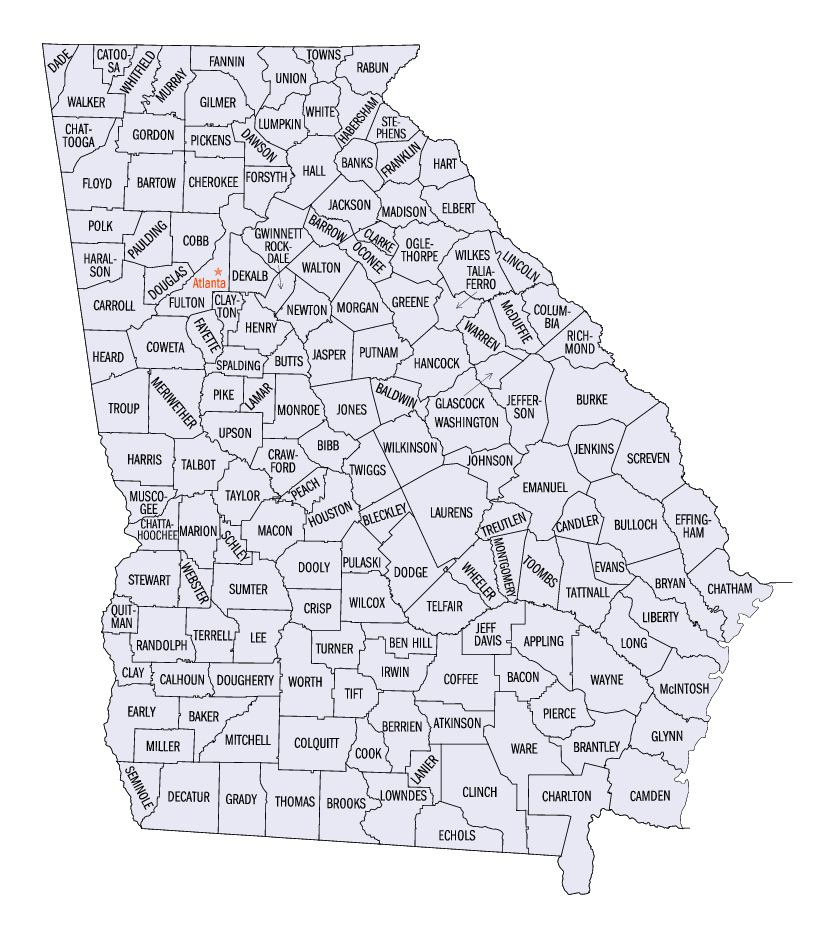
Georgia counties

The following are tallies of current listings by county. (Note: These counts are based on entries in the National Register Information Database as of March 13, 2009 and new weekly listings posted since then on the National Register of Historic Places web site. There are frequent additions to the listings and occasional delistings and the counts here are approximate and not official. New entries are added to the official Register on a weekly basis. Also, the counts in this table exclude boundary increase and decrease listings which only modify the area covered by an existing property or district, although carrying a separate National Register reference number.)

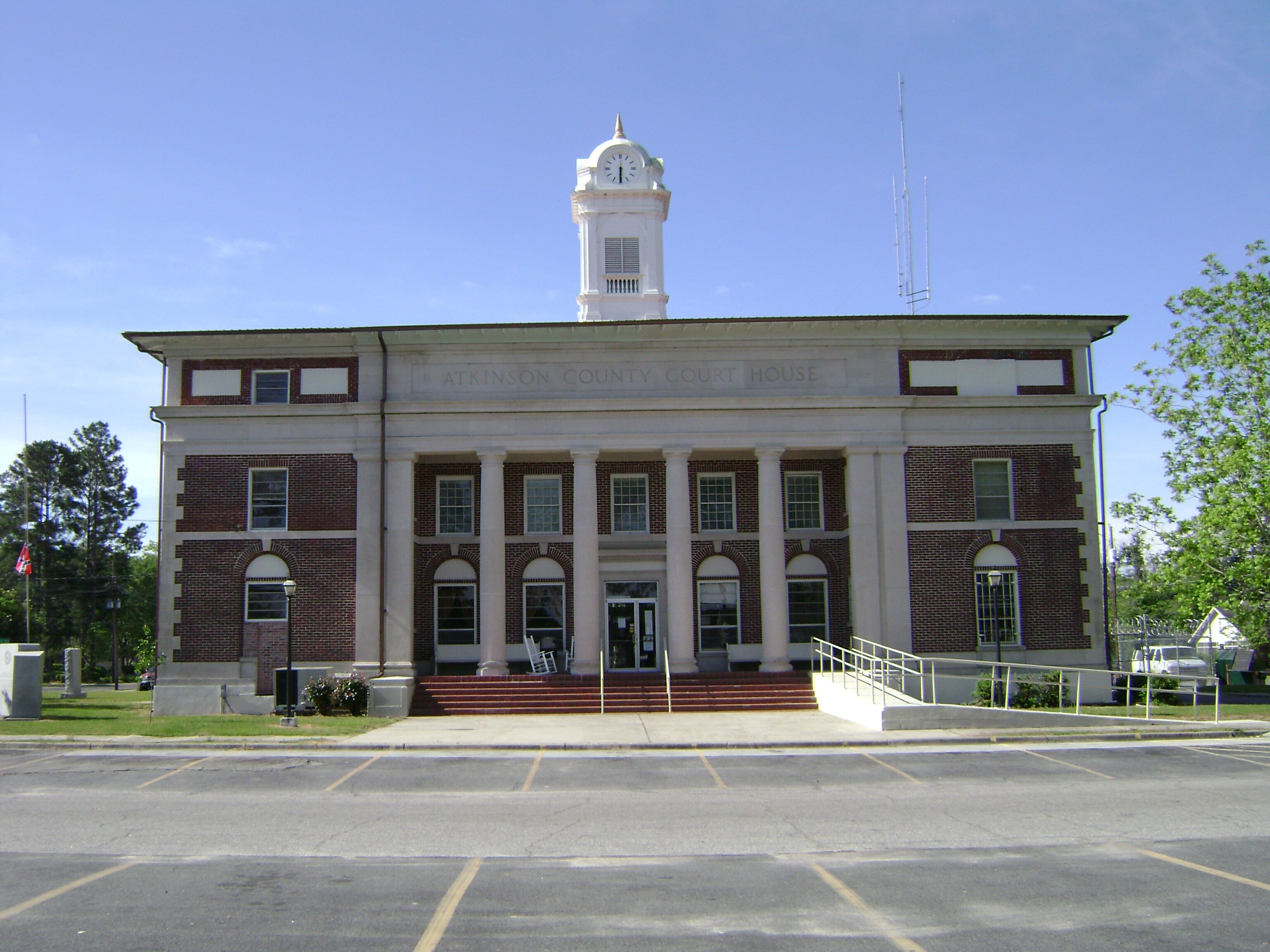
Atkinson County Courthouse

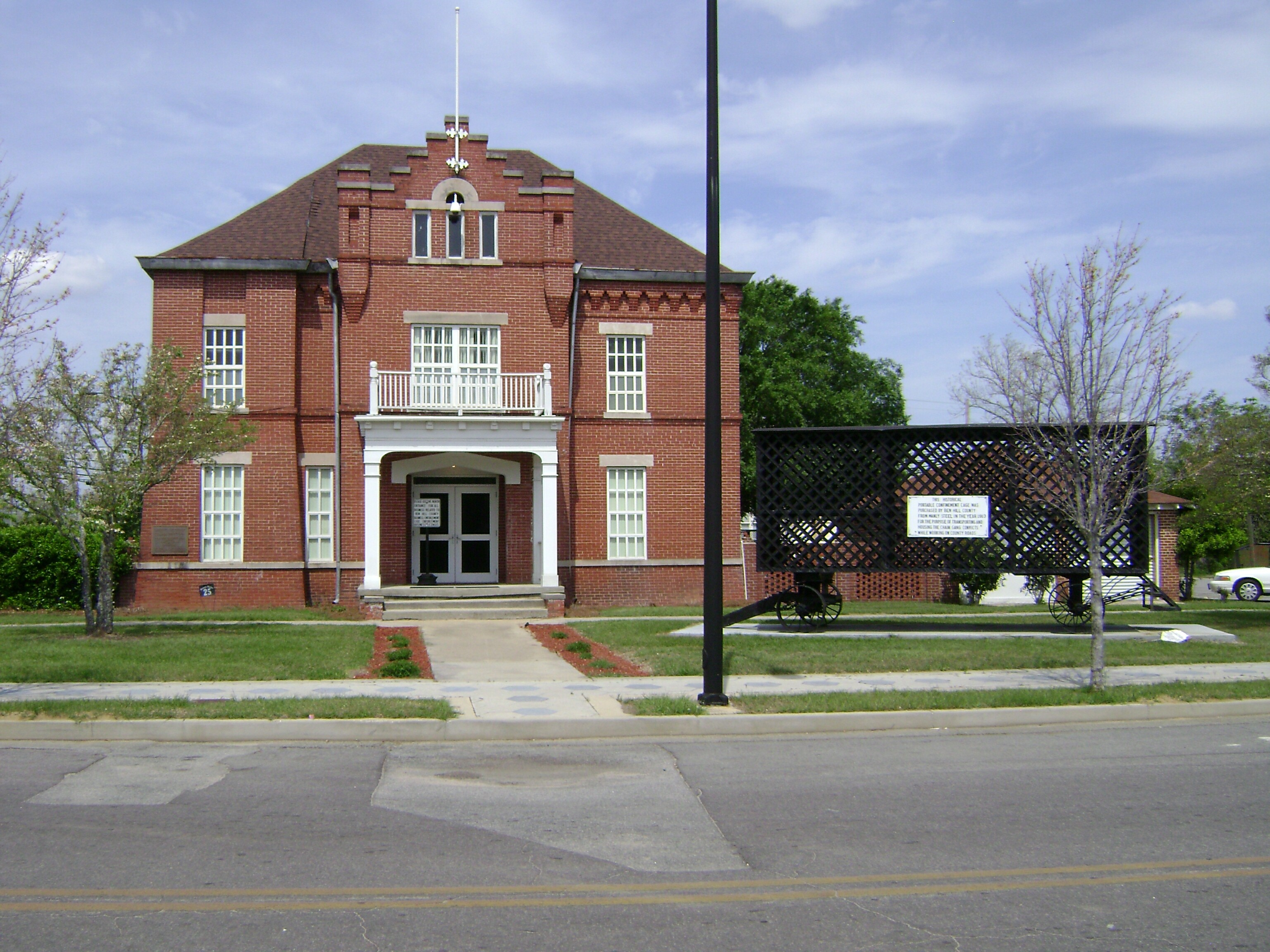
Ben Hill County Jail

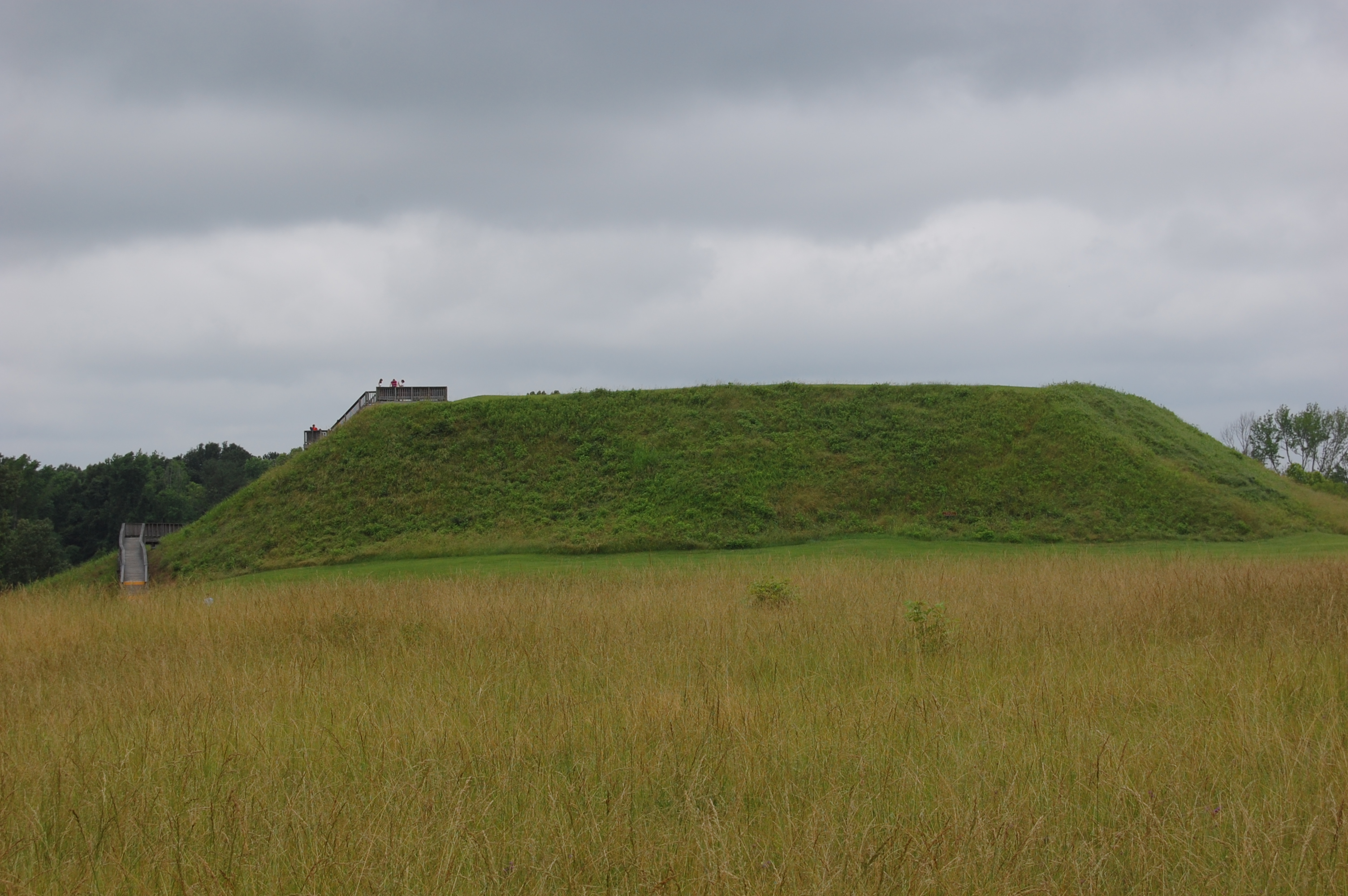
Ocmulgee National Monument, in Bibb County, Georgia

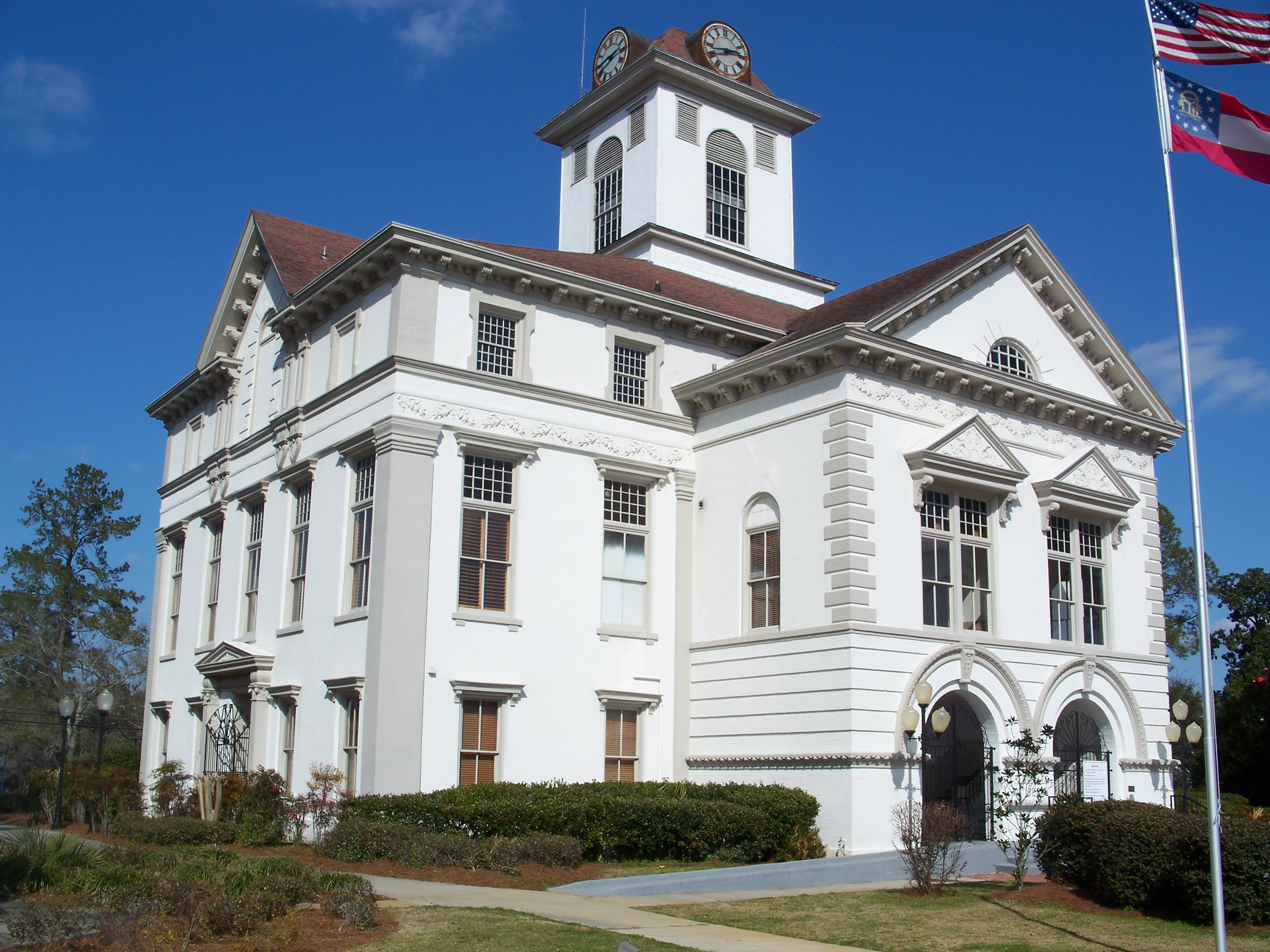
Brooks County Courthouse

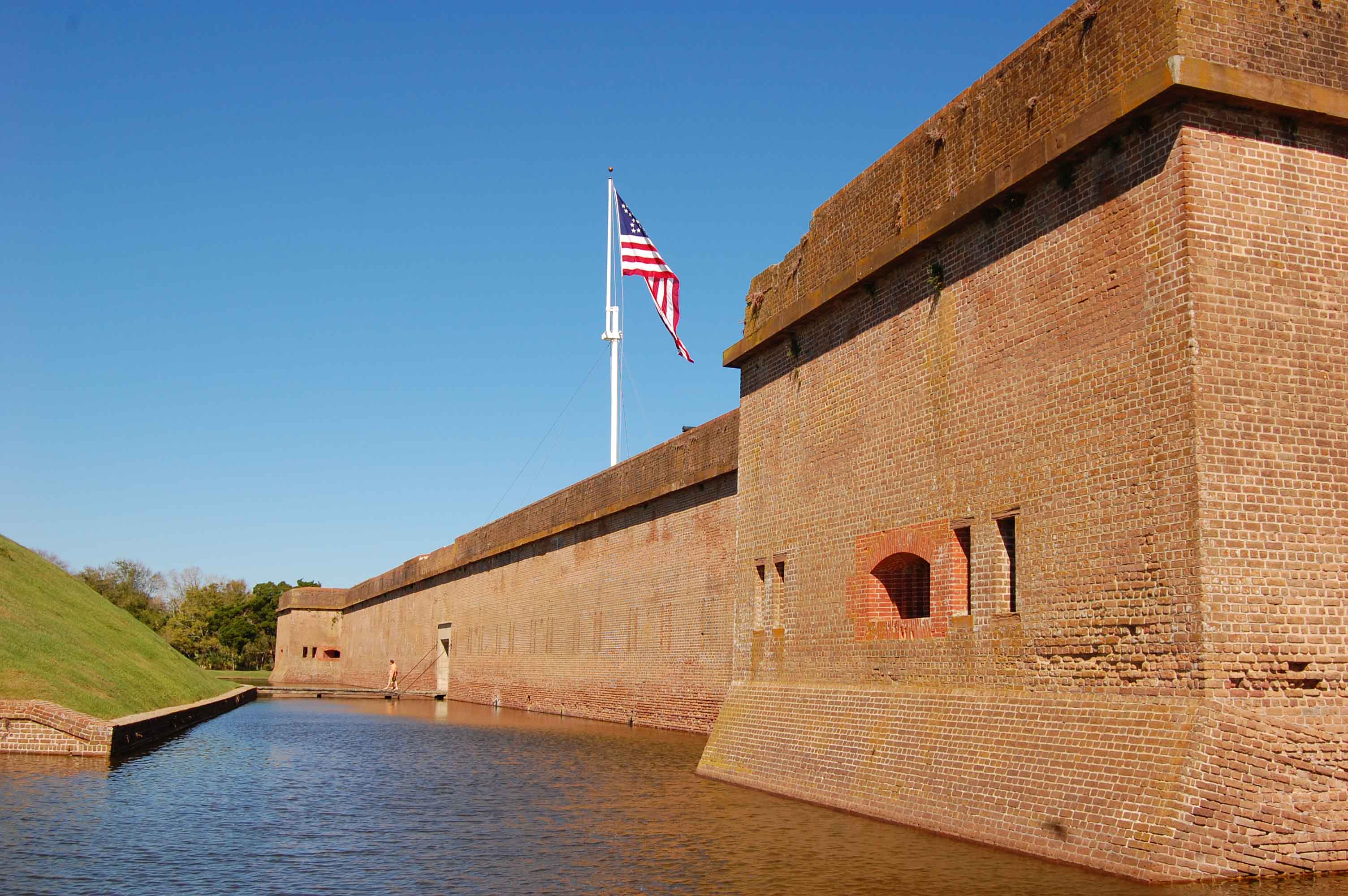
Fort Pulaski, in Chatham County

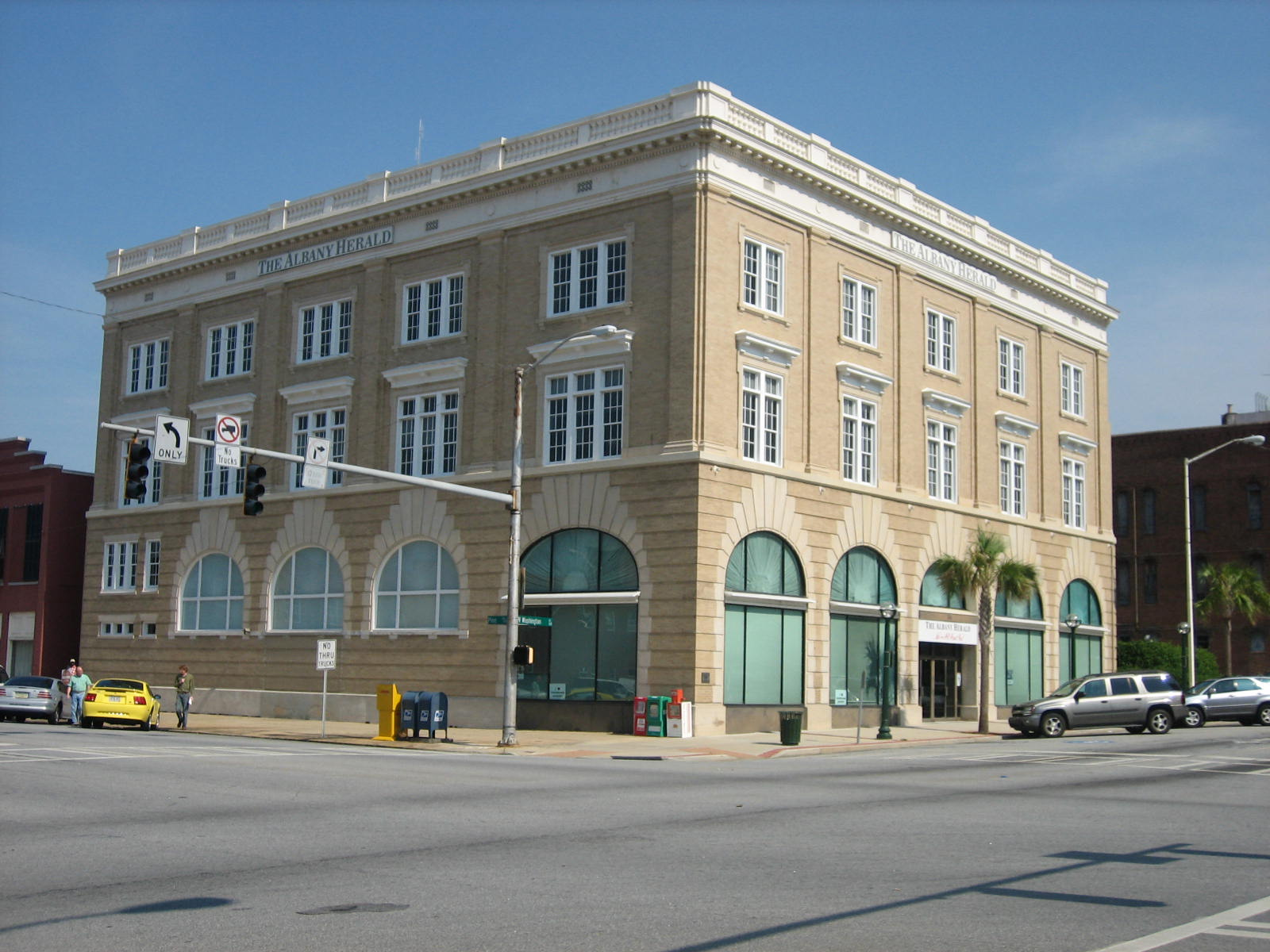
Rosenberg Brothers Department Store, in Dougherty County

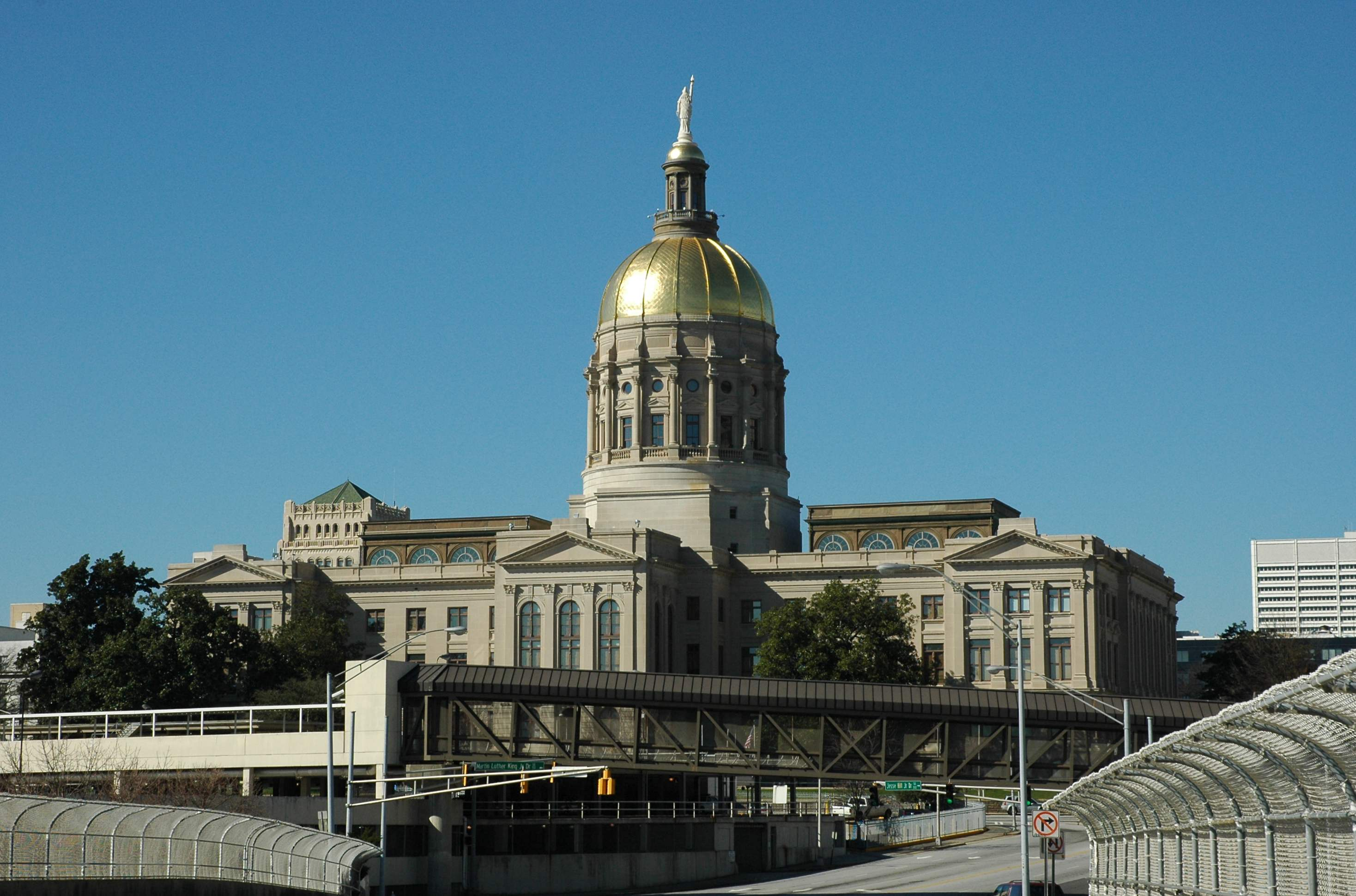
Georgia State Capitol, in Fulton County

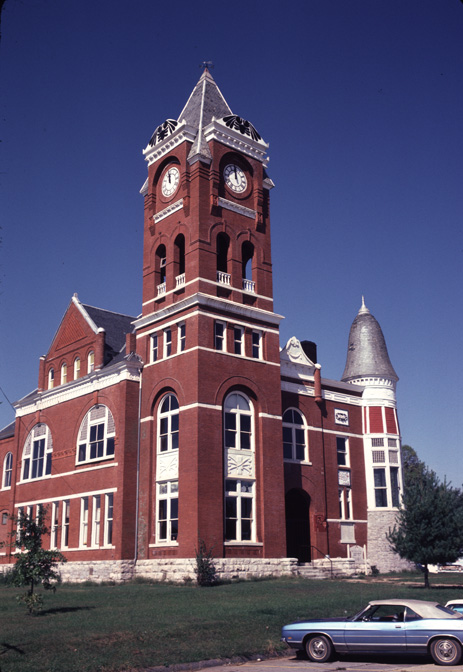
Haralson County Courthouse

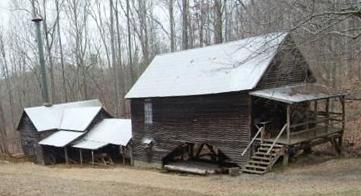
Jarrell Plantation, in Jones County

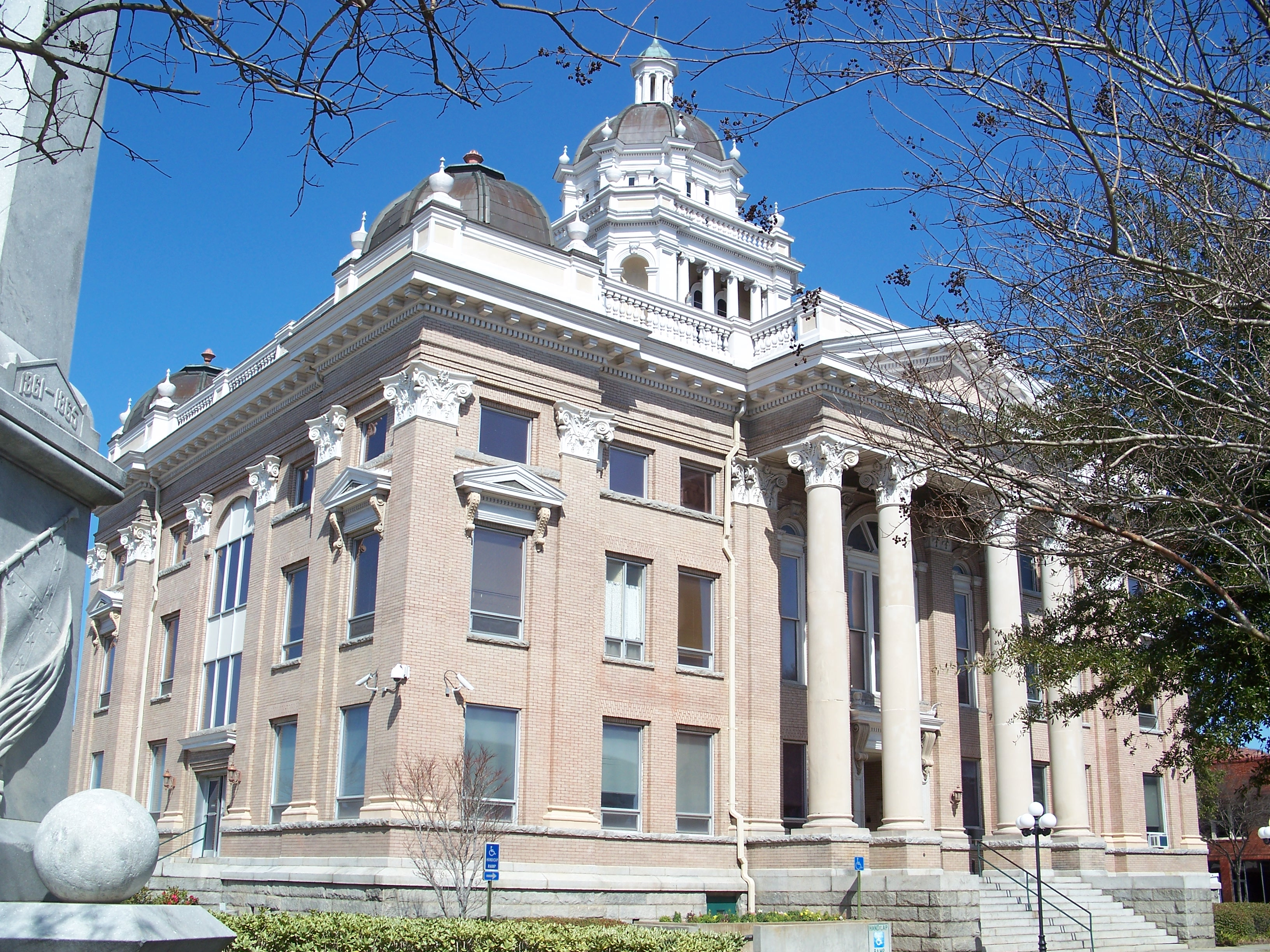
Lowndes County Courthouse

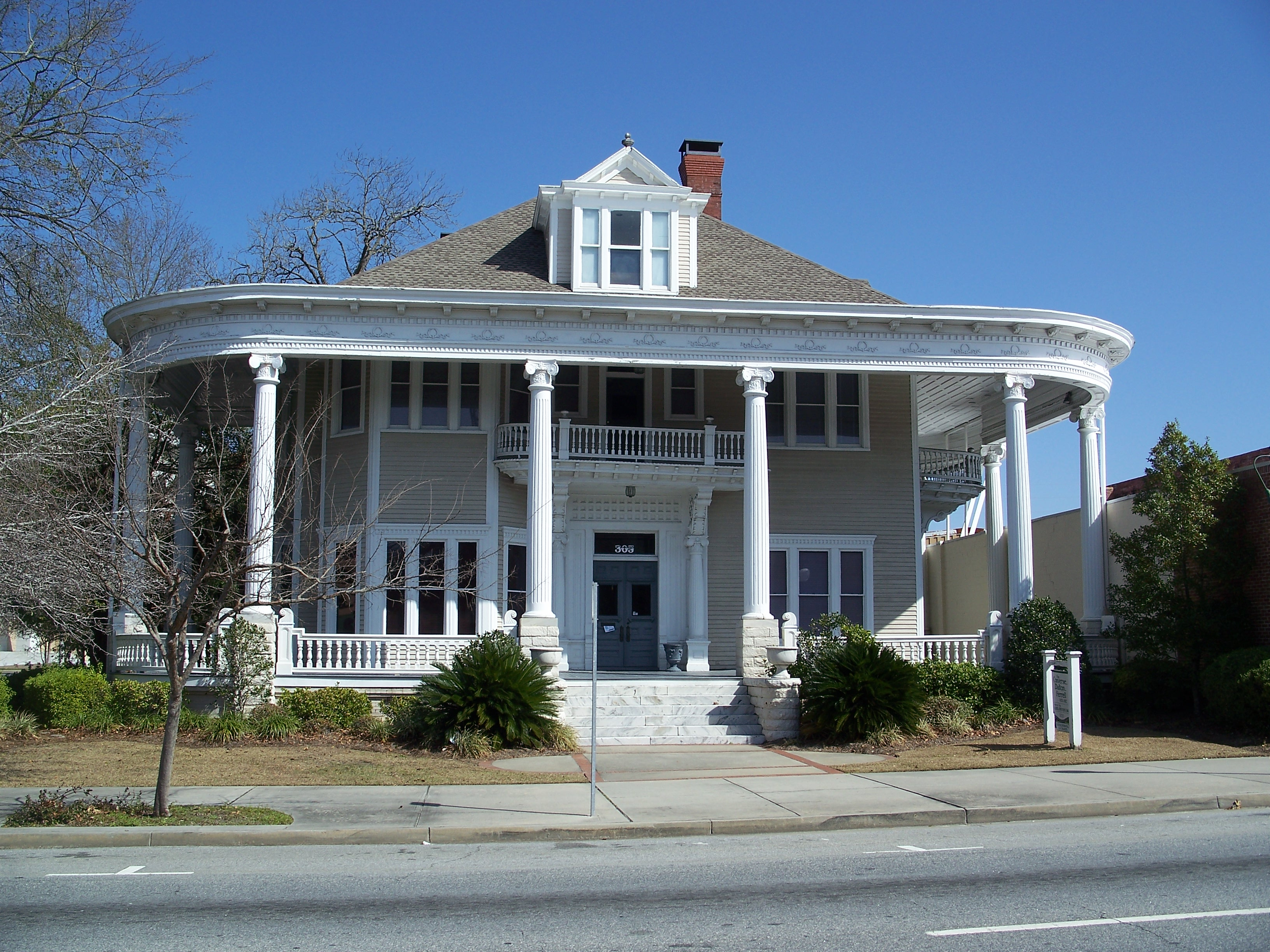
Converse-Dalton House, in Lowndes County, Georgia

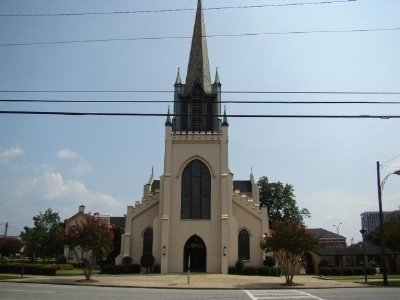
Church of the Holy Family, in Muscogee County

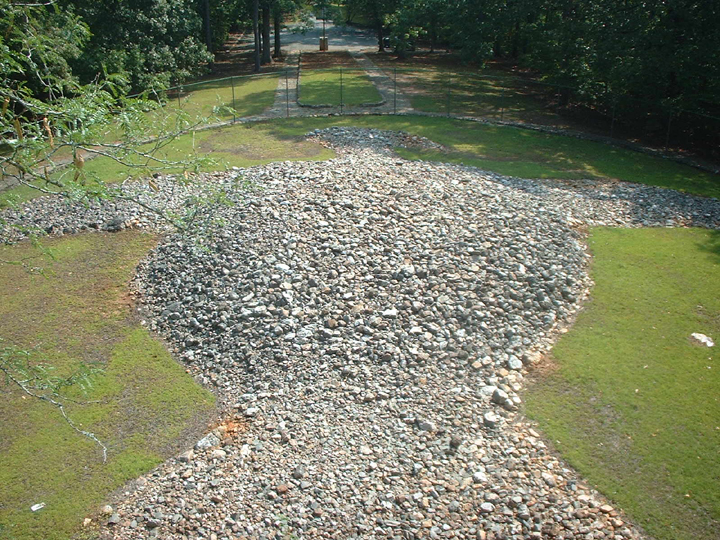
Rock Eagle Site, in Putnam County, Georgia

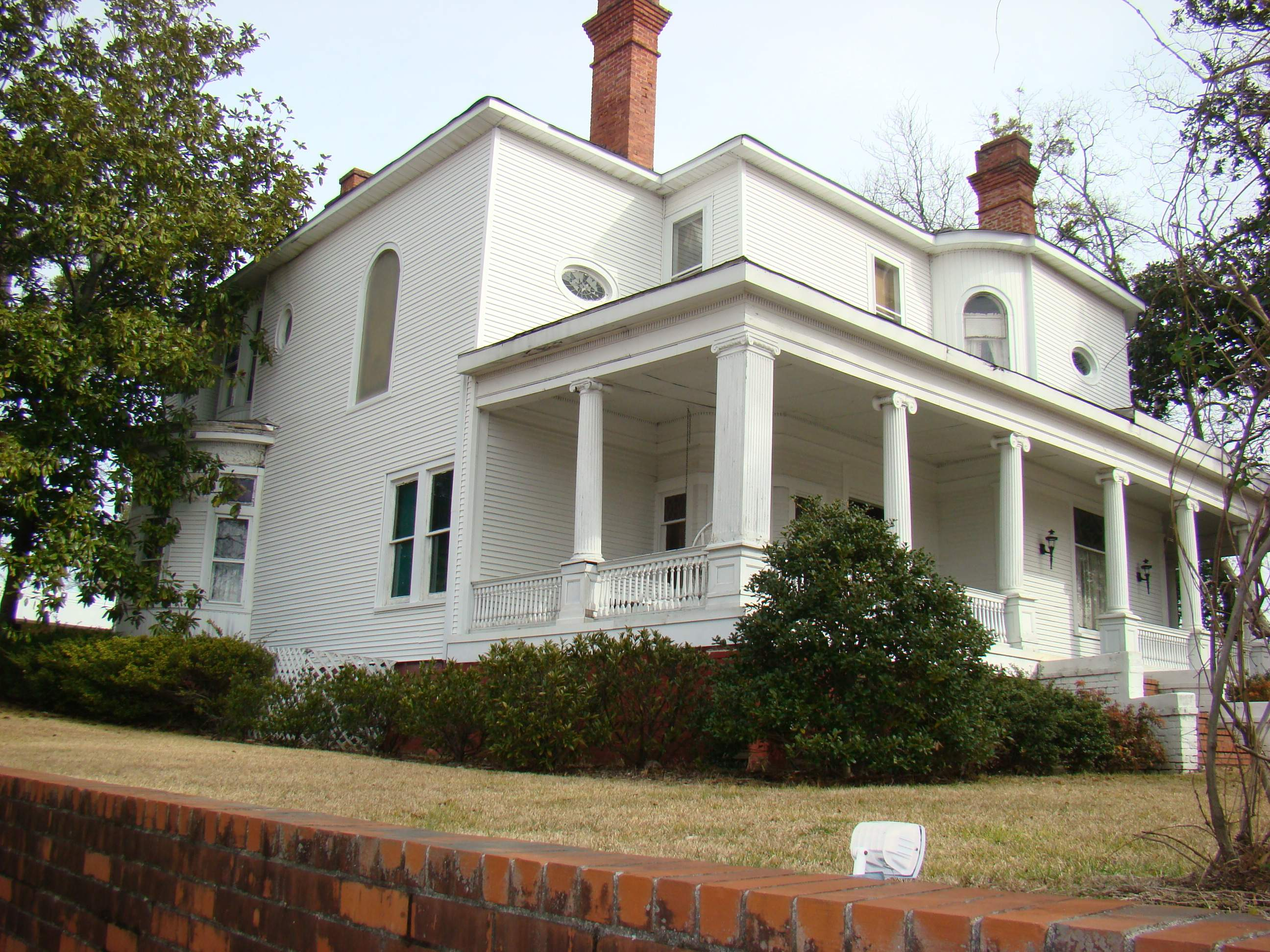
James B. Simmons House in Stephens County, Georgia

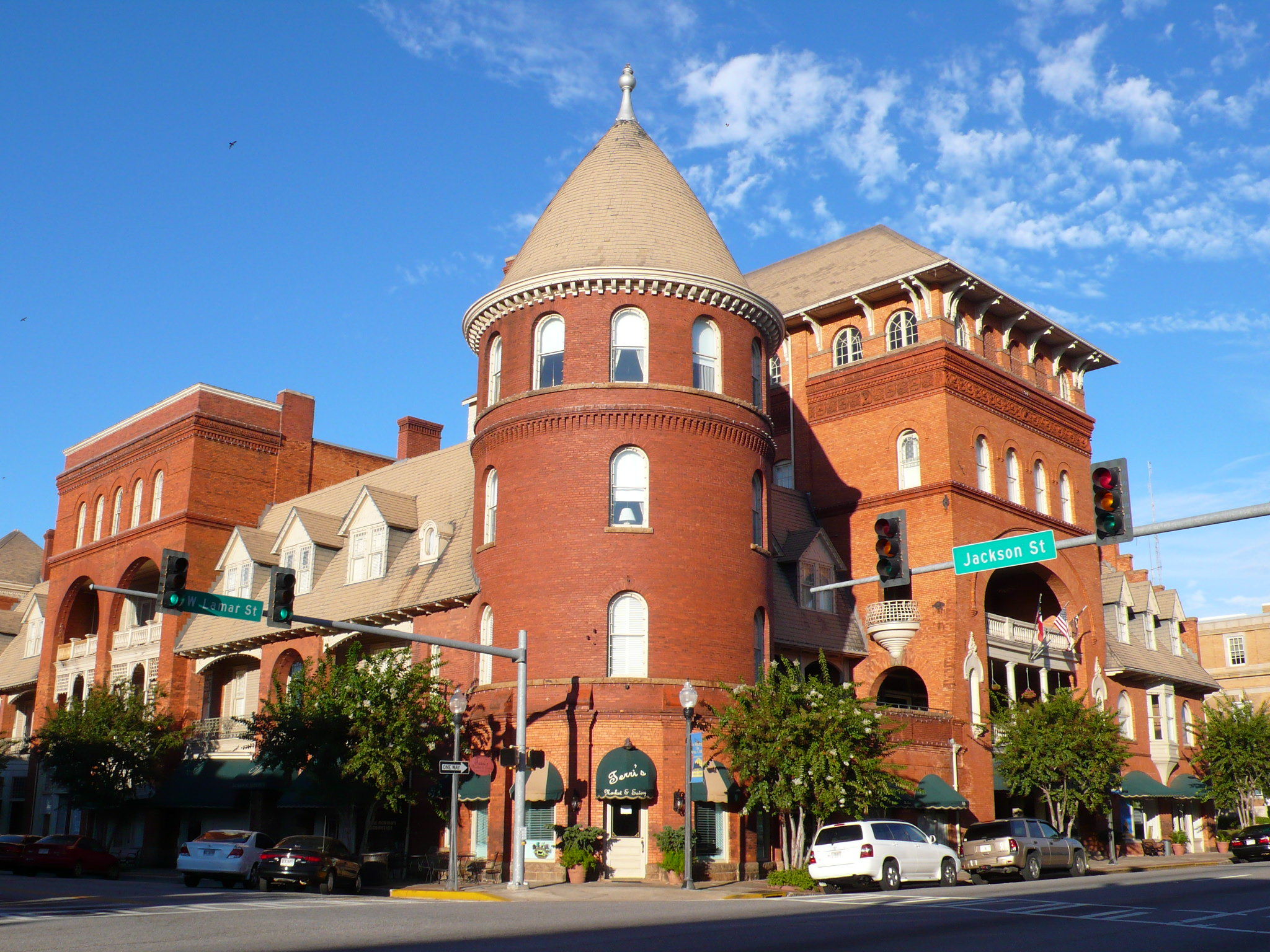
Windsor Hotel, part of the Americus Historic District in Sumter County

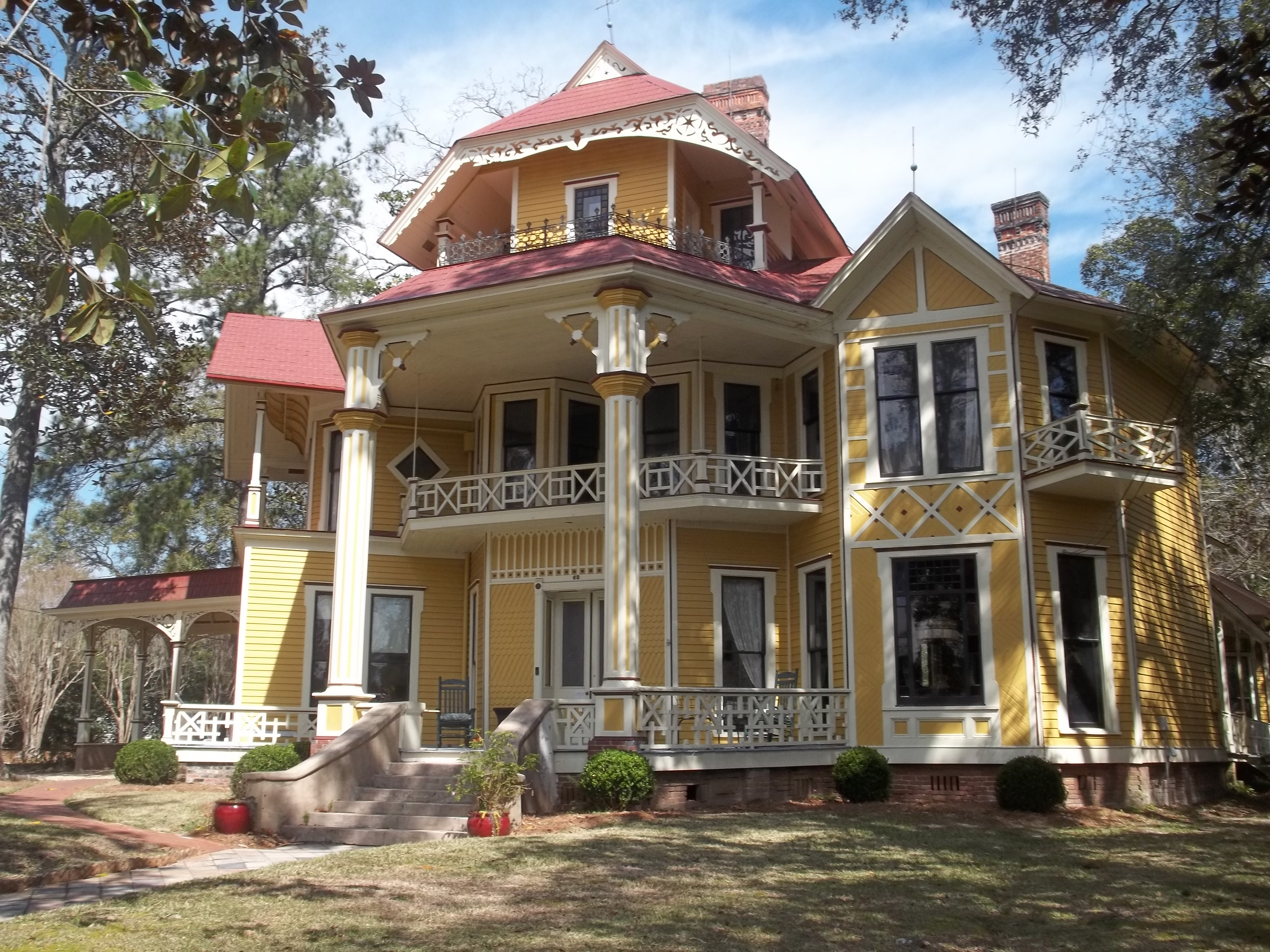
Lapham-Patterson House, in Thomas County

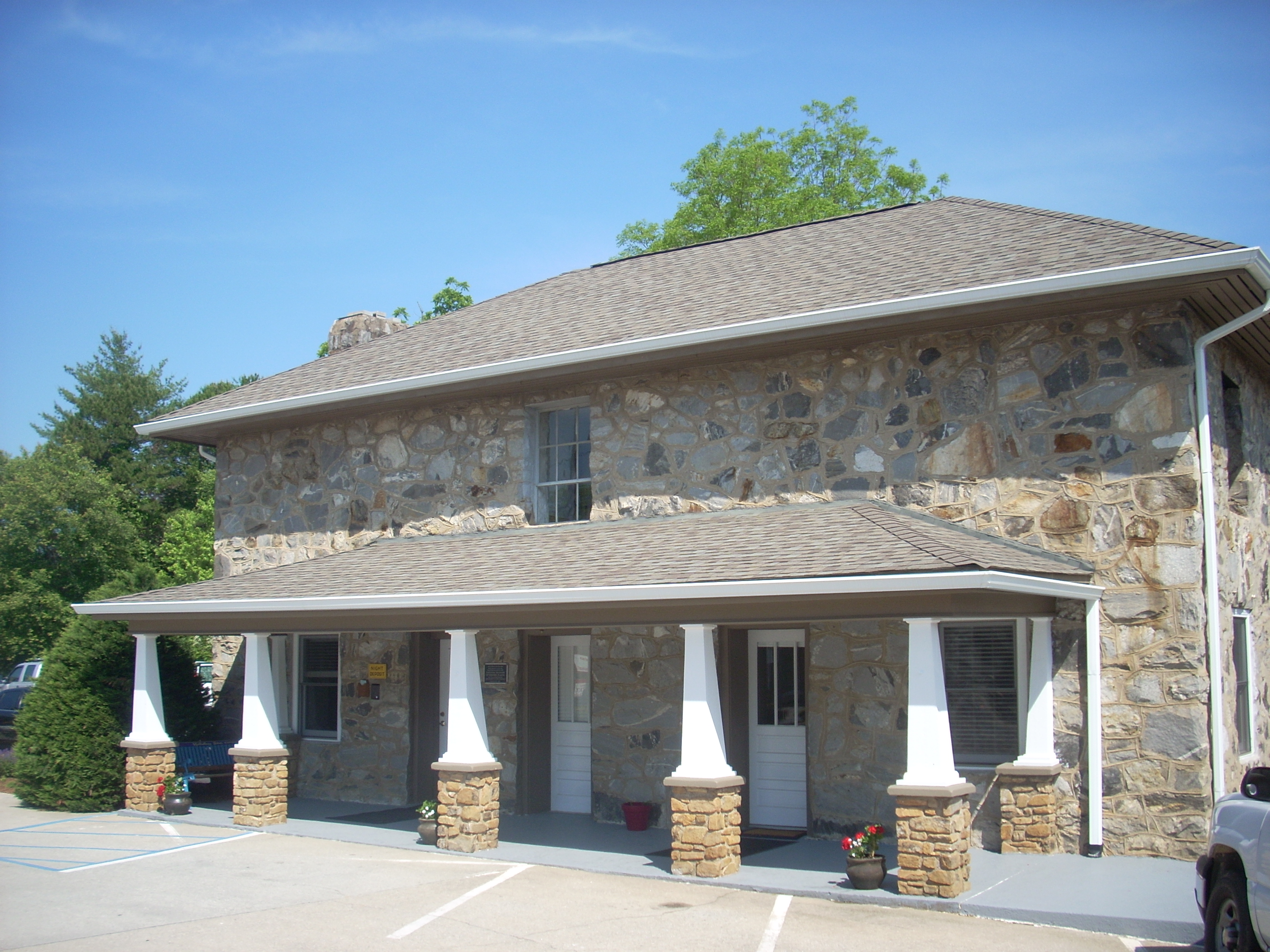
Union County Jail

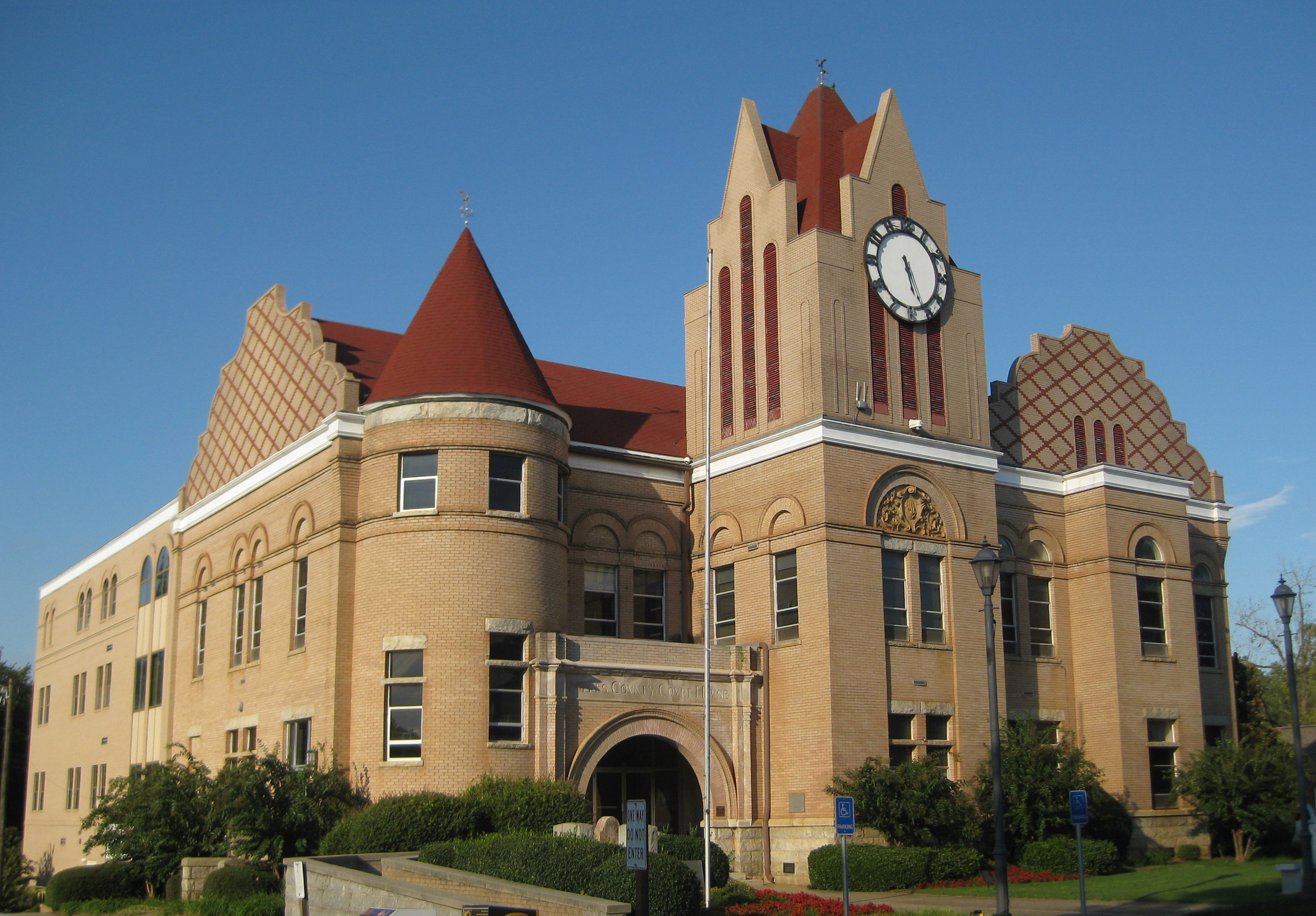
Wilkes County Courthouse

	County	# of Sites	# of NHLs
1	Appling	5	0
2	Atkinson	2	0
3	Bacon	4	0
4	Baker	4	0
5	Baldwin	22	1
6	Banks	14	0
7	Barrow	15	0
8	Bartow	21	1
9	Ben Hill	7	0
10	Berrien	4	0
11	Bibb	75	2
12	Bleckley	3	0
13	Brantley	2	0
14	Brooks	9	0
15	Bryan	11	0
16	Bulloch	24	0
17	Burke	8	0
18	Butts	4	0
19	Calhoun	2	0
20	Camden	17	0
21	Candler	5	0
22	Carroll	18	0
23	Catoosa	9	0
24	Charlton	4	0
25	Chatham	77	8
26	Chattahoochee	3	0
27	Chattooga	8	0
28	Cherokee	10	0
29	Clarke	60	1
30	Clay	6	0
31	Clayton	5	0
32	Clinch	2	0
33	Cobb	48	0
34	Coffee	6	0
35	Colquitt	9	0
36	Columbia	5	2
37	Cook	3	0
38	Coweta	28	0
39	Crawford	6	0
40	Crisp	5	0
41	Dade	2	0
42	Dawson	3	0
43	Decatur	8	0
44	DeKalb	57	0
45	Dodge	6	0
46	Dooly	9	0
47	Dougherty	22	0
48	Douglas	8	0
49	Early	7	1
50	Echols	2	0
51	Effingham	8	0
52	Elbert	14	0
53	Emanuel	9	0
54	Evans	4	0
55	Fannin	4	0
56	Fayette	5	0
57	Floyd	48	2
58	Forsyth	5	0
59	Franklin	44	0
60	Fulton	234	8
61	Gilmer	1	0
62	Glascock	1	0
63	Glynn	20	1
64	Gordon	5	1
65	Grady	9	0
66	Greene	24	0
67	Gwinnett	17	0
68	Habersham	37	0
69	Hall	23	0
70	Hancock	12	0
71	Haralson	3	0
72	Harris	16	1
73	Hart	35	0
74	Heard	2	0
75	Henry	13	0
76	Houston	3	0
77	Irwin	3	0
78	Jackson	15	0
79	Jasper	7	0
80	Jeff Davis	2	0
81	Jefferson	5	0
82	Jenkins	6	0
83	Johnson	2	0
84	Jones	9	0
85	Lamar	8	0
86	Lanier	1	0
87	Laurens	9	0
88	Lee	3	0
89	Liberty	12	2
90	Lincoln	10	0
91	Long	3	0
92	Lowndes	17	0
93	Lumpkin	12	1
94	Macon	16	0
95	Madison	6	0
96	Marion	8	0
97	McDuffie	16	1
98	McIntosh	11	0
99	Meriwether	23	1
100	Miller	1	0
101	Mitchell	10	0
102	Monroe	9	0
103	Montgomery	2	0
104	Morgan	14	0
105	Murray	9	0
106	Muscogee	140	3
107	Newton	13	0
108	Oconee	9	0
109	Oglethorpe	13	0
110	Paulding	4	0
111	Peach	8	0
112	Pickens	7	0
113	Pierce	3	0
114	Pike	4	0
115	Polk	9	0
116	Pulaski	8	0
117	Putnam	10	0
118	Quitman	2	0
119	Rabun	8	0
120	Randolph	3	0
121	Richmond	50	6
122	Rockdale	7	0
123	Schley	2	0
124	Screven	5	0
125	Seminole	3	0
126	Spalding	15	0
127	Stephens	10	1
128	Stewart	27	0
129	Sumter	16	0
130	Talbot	12	0
131	Taliaferro	7	1
132	Tattnall	3	0
133	Taylor	5	0
134	Telfair	3	0
135	Terrell	6	0
136	Thomas	40	1
137	Tift	3	0
138	Toombs	9	0
139	Towns	2	0
140	Treutlen	1	0
141	Troup	35	1
142	Turner	6	0
143	Twiggs	7	0
144	Union	5	0
145	Upson	7	0
146	Walker	18	1
147	Walton	24	0
148	Ware	8	0
149	Warren	4	0
150	Washington	20	0
151	Wayne	4	0
152	Webster	3	0
153	Wheeler	3	0
154	White	6	0
155	Whitfield	12	0
156	Wilcox	2	0
157	Wilkes	30	2
158	Wilkinson	1	0
159	Worth	7	0
(duplicates)		(10) (Note: The following sites are listed in multiple counties: Andersonville National Historic Site (Macon and Sumter), Augusta Canal Industrial District (Columbia and Richmond), Brookhaven Historic District (DeKalb and Fulton), Chickamauga and Chattanooga National Military Park (Catoosa and Walker), Gillsville Historic District (Banks and Hall), Inman Park-Moreland Historic District (DeKalb and Fulton), Jewell Historic District (Hancock and Warren), Maysville Historic District (Banks and Jackson), Pebble Hill Plantation (Grady and Thomas), and Roscoe-Dunaway Gardens Historic District (Coweta and Fulton).)	(1) (Note: The following site is listed in multiple counties: Etowah Mounds (Bartow and Floyd).)
Total:		2,198	48

== See also ==
- List of National Historic Landmarks in Georgia (U.S. state)
- List of bridges on the National Register of Historic Places in Georgia
- List of historical societies in Georgia (U.S. state)
