= Union County Jail =

Union County Jail may refer to:

- Union County Jail (Blairsville, Georgia), listed on the National Register of Historic Places in Union County, Georgia
- Union County Jail (Union, South Carolina), listed on the National Register of Historic Places in Union County, South Carolina
- Union County Jail, New Jersey
