= National Register of Historic Places listings in Barrow County, Georgia =

This is a list of properties and districts in Barrow County, Georgia that are listed on the National Register of Historic Places (NRHP).

This National Park Service list is complete through NPS recent listings posted October 2, 2026.

== Current listings ==
	Name on the Register	Image	Date listed	Location	City or town	Description
1	Athens-Candler-Church Street Historic District	Athens-Candler-Church Street Historic District	April 17, 1986 (#86000799)	Roughly Candler St. between Melrose and Woodlawn Sts., Church St., and Athens St. between Horton and Center Sts. 33°59′43″N 83°43′37″W	Winder	
2	Auburn Historic District	Auburn Historic District	June 4, 1997 (#97000527)	Roughly bounded by 3rd Ave., 6th St., 6th Ave., and Main St. 34°00′48″N 83°49′39″W	Auburn	
3	Barrow County Courthouse	Barrow County Courthouse	September 18, 1980 (#80000970)	Courthouse Sq. 33°59′32″N 83°43′18″W	Winder	
4	Carlyle-Blakey Farm		April 29, 2008 (#08000353)	568 GA 211 NW. 34°00′40″N 83°45′27″W	Winder	
5	Downtown Winder Historic District	Downtown Winder Historic District	May 6, 1994 (#94000412)	Roughly bounded by Broad, Jackson, Candler and Athens Sts. 33°59′33″N 83°43′15″W	Winder	Merger of Broad Street Commercial Historic District & Jackson Street Commercial Historic District, plus additional properties.
6	Jackson-Johns House	Jackson-Johns House	April 18, 1985 (#85000847)	39 Candler St. 33°59′37″N 83°43′16″W	Winder	
7	Kilgore Mill Covered Bridge and Mill Site	Kilgore Mill Covered Bridge and Mill Site	April 14, 1975 (#75000572)	3.5 mi. SW of Bethlehem across Apalachee River/county line 33°54′00″N 83°44′25″W	Bethlehem	Destroyed by fire in 1993
8	Manning Gin Farm	Manning Gin Farm	May 8, 1991 (#91000541)	Jct. of Manning Gin and McElhannon Rds. 33°55′36″N 83°42′09″W	Bethlehem	
9	North Broad Street Residential Historic District	North Broad Street Residential Historic District	July 26, 1984 (#84000888)	Roughly bounded by Woodlawn Ave., Center, Broad, and Stephens Sts. 33°59′43″N 83°43′06″W	Winder	
10	Omer Christian Church and Cemetery	Omer Christian Church and Cemetery	February 10, 2000 (#00000074)	Jct. of GA 316 and GA 324; 33°57′09″N 83°45′46″W	Winder	
11	Rockwell Universalist Church	Rockwell Universalist Church	May 2, 1985 (#85000933)	GA 53 & Rockwell Church Rd. 34°02′07″N 83°42′49″W	Winder	
12	Russell Homeplace Historic District		September 7, 1984 (#84000890)	US 29; 33°58′33″N 83°42′17″W	Russell	
13	Statham Historic District	Statham Historic District	December 17, 1998 (#98001521)	Roughly bounded by Elizabeth, 8th, and 1st Sts., and CSX RR tracks 33°57′53″N 83°35′42″W	Statham	
14	Winder Depot	Winder Depot	May 8, 1979 (#79000696)	Broad and Porter Sts. 33°59′29″N 83°43′21″W	Winder	

== Former listings ==
	Name on the Register	Image	Date listed	Date removed	Location	City or town	Description
1	Broad Street Commercial Historic District	Broad Street Commercial Historic District	July 26, 1984 (#84000884)	May 6, 1994	Broad and Athens Sts. 33°59′33″N 83°43′17″W	Winder	Merged into Downtown Winder Historic District.
2	Jackson Street Commercial Historic District	Jackson Street Commercial Historic District	July 26, 1984 (#84000885)	May 6, 1994	Roughly bounded by Jackson, Athens, Candler, and Broad Sts. 33°59′31″N 83°43′11″W	Winder	Merged into Downtown Winder Historic District.
