= Cave Spring High School =

Cave Spring High School may refer to:

- Cave Spring Female Academy (Cave Spring, Georgia), listed on the NRHP in Georgia
- Cave Spring High School (Cave Spring, Georgia), listed on the NRHP in Georgia
- Cave Spring High School (Roanoke, Virginia)
