= Treutlen County Courthouse =

Historic courthouse in Georga, US

- U.S. National Register of Historic Places
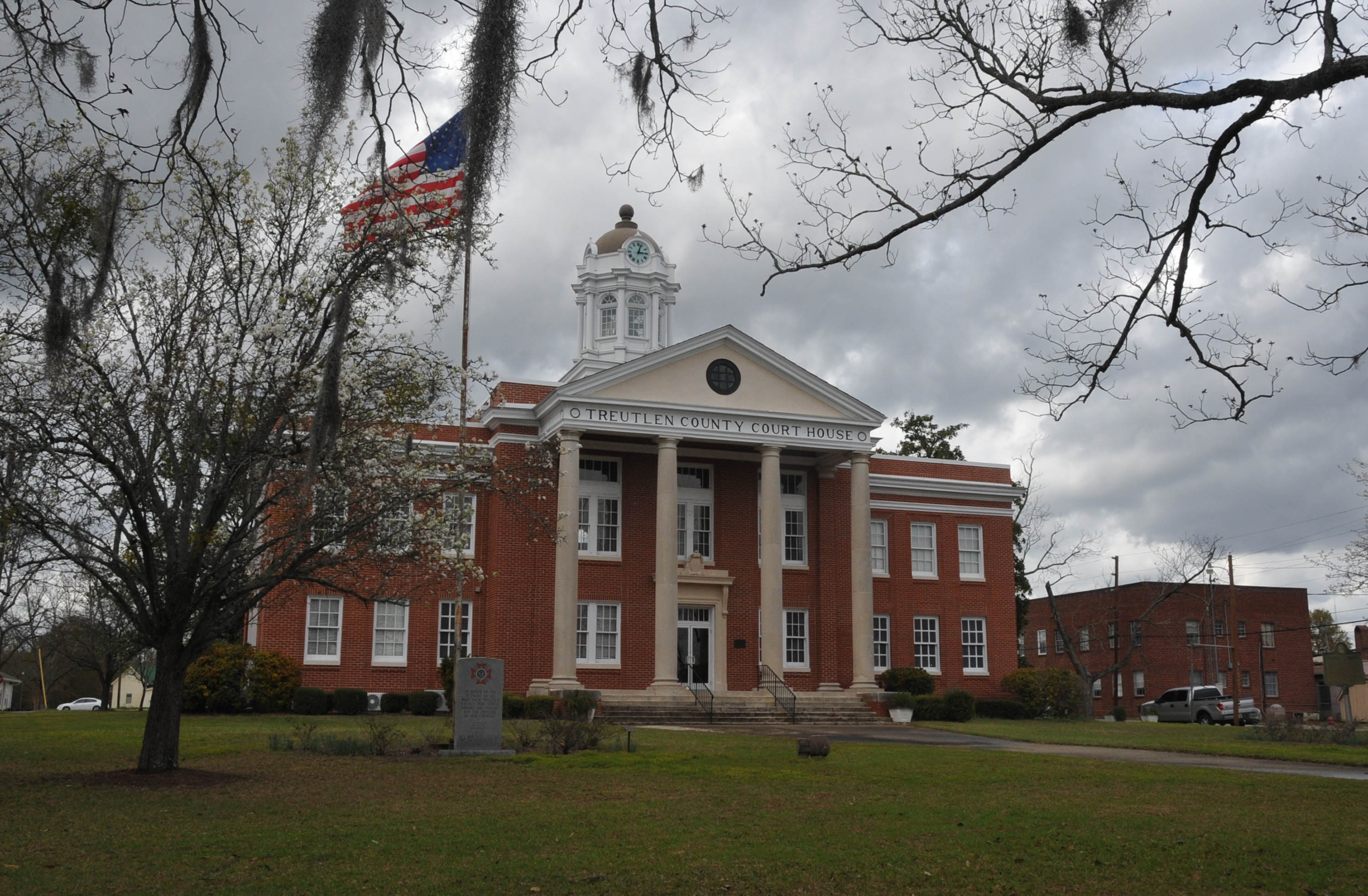

- Location within Georgia
- Location: Courthouse Sq., Soperton, Georgia
- Coordinates: 32.37717°N 82.59336°W
- Area: 1.5 acres (0.61 ha)
- Built: 1920
- Architect: Baldwin, J.J.; Crutchfield, I.P.
- Architectural style: Classical Revival
- MPS: Georgia County Courthouses TR
- NRHP reference No.: 80001246
- Added to NRHP: September 18, 1980

Treutlen County Courthouse is a historic courthouse building in Soperton, Georgia's Courthouse Square in Treutlen County, Georgia. It is a Neoclassical architecture building. It was built in 1920 at a cost of $20,000. The facade is made of brick with stone trim. A Doric portico extends from the main building. The interior has a cross plan, with four entrances. Double staircases lead to the courtroom. The judge's bench is framed by heavy wooden pediment and pilasters. It was added to the National Register of Historic Places on September 18, 1980.

== See also ==
- National Register of Historic Places listings in Treutlen County, Georgia
