= The Coliseum–Duplex Envelope Company Building =

Historic building in Virginia, US

- U.S. National Register of Historic Places
- U.S. Historic district – Contributing property
- Virginia Landmarks Register
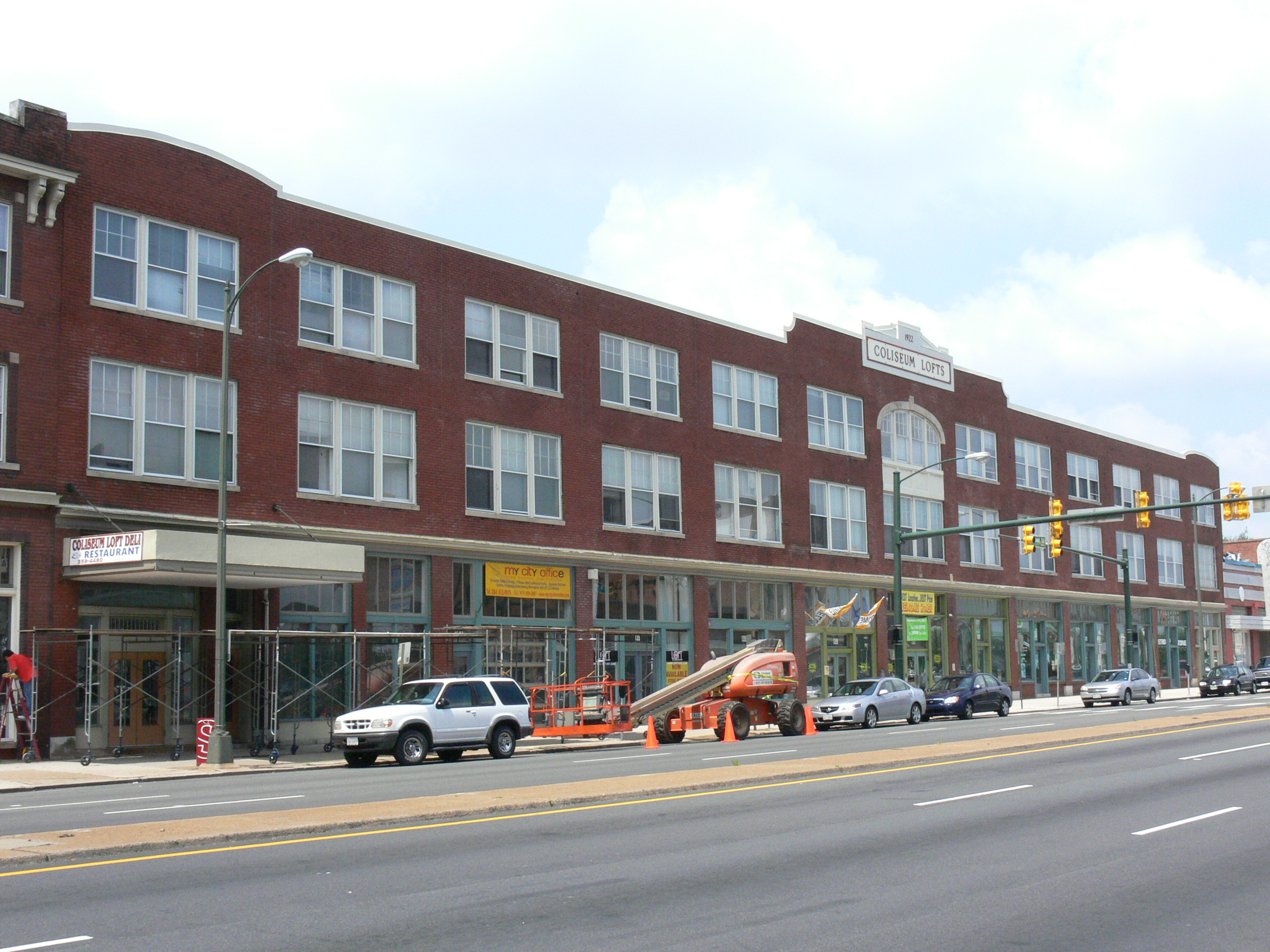
- Location: 1339-1363 W. Broad St., Richmond, Virginia
- Coordinates: 37°33′11″N 77°26′42″W
- Area: 0.3 acres (0.12 ha)
- Built: 1922
- Architect: Armentrout, E.H.; et al.
- Architectural style: Early Commercial
- Part of: West Broad Street Commercial Historic District (ID00001667)
- NRHP reference No.: 99000077
- VLR No.: 127-5811

Significant dates
- Added to NRHP: January 27, 1999
- Designated CP: January 16, 2001
- Designated VLR: December 10, 1998

The Coliseum–Duplex Envelope Company Building, also known as the Valentine Auction Company Building, is a building in Richmond, Virginia that was built in 1922 in Early Commercial style.

It was listed on the National Register of Historic Places in 1999. It is located in the West Broad Street Commercial Historic District.
