= National Register of Historic Places listings in Union County, Georgia =

This is a list of properties and districts in Union County, Georgia that are listed on the National Register of Historic Places (NRHP).

This National Park Service list is complete through NPS recent listings posted March 21, 2025.

== Current listings ==
	Name on the Register	Image	Date listed	Location	City or town	Description
1	Nottely Hydroelectric Project	Nottely Hydroelectric Project	August 11, 2017 (#100001455)	Nottely Dam Rd. 34°57′33″N 84°05′21″W	Blairsville	
2	Old Union County Courthouse	Old Union County Courthouse	September 18, 1980 (#80001249)	Courthouse Sq. 34°52′34″N 83°57′31″W	Blairsville	
3	Raburn-Casteel House	Raburn-Casteel House	October 26, 2001 (#01001181)	US 129, 4 mi. N. of Blairsville; 34°54′29″N 84°00′36″W	Blairsville	
4	Union County Jail	Union County Jail	September 13, 1985 (#85002088)	Blue Ridge Rd. 34°52′33″N 83°57′36″W	Blairsville	
5	Walasi-Yi Inn	Walasi-Yi Inn	January 12, 1979 (#79000749)	S. of Blairsville on U.S. 129 at Neels Gap; 34°44′06″N 83°55′03″W	Blairsville	
