= North Broad Street Mansion District =

Historic district in Pennsylvania, United States

- U.S. National Register of Historic Places
- U.S. Historic district
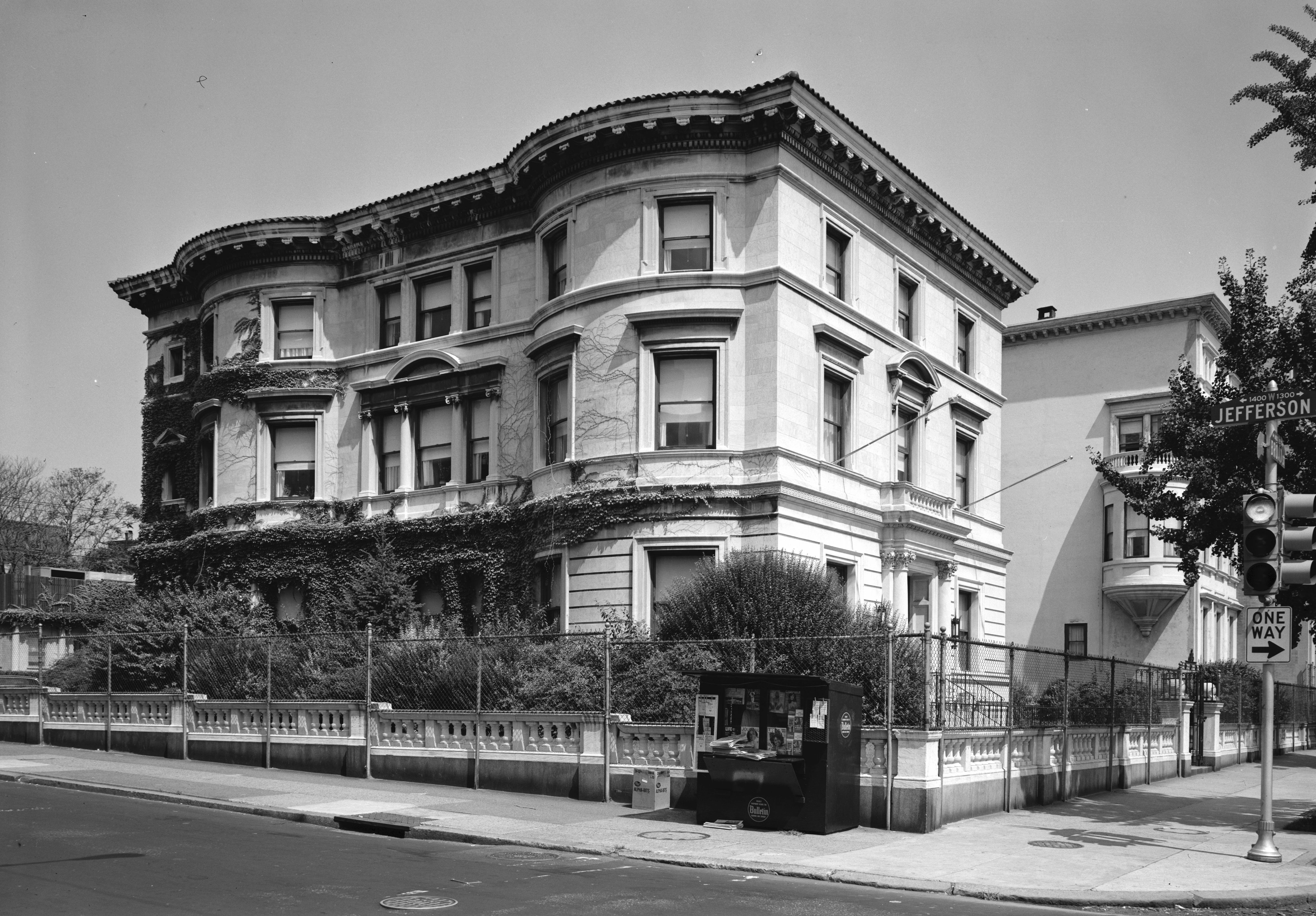
- Alfred E. Burk House

- Location within Philadelphia Location within Pennsylvania Location within the United States
- Location: Roughly bounded by Broad, Jefferson, Willington, and Oxford Sts., Philadelphia, Pennsylvania
- Coordinates: 39°58′36″N 75°9′39″W
- Area: 15 acres (6.1 ha)
- Architect: MacArthur, John, Jr. et al.
- Architectural style: Late Victorian
- NRHP reference No.: 85000674
- Added to NRHP: March 29, 1985

The North Broad Street Mansion District is a historic district in Lower North Philadelphia, Pennsylvania. It is roughly bounded by Broad, Jefferson, Willington, and Oxford Streets, along the west side of the street it was named for. It comprises 76 contributing buildings and 15 non-contributing buildings over 15 acres.

The district was added to the National Register of Historic Places in 1985.
