= Manning Gin Farm =

- U.S. National Register of Historic Places
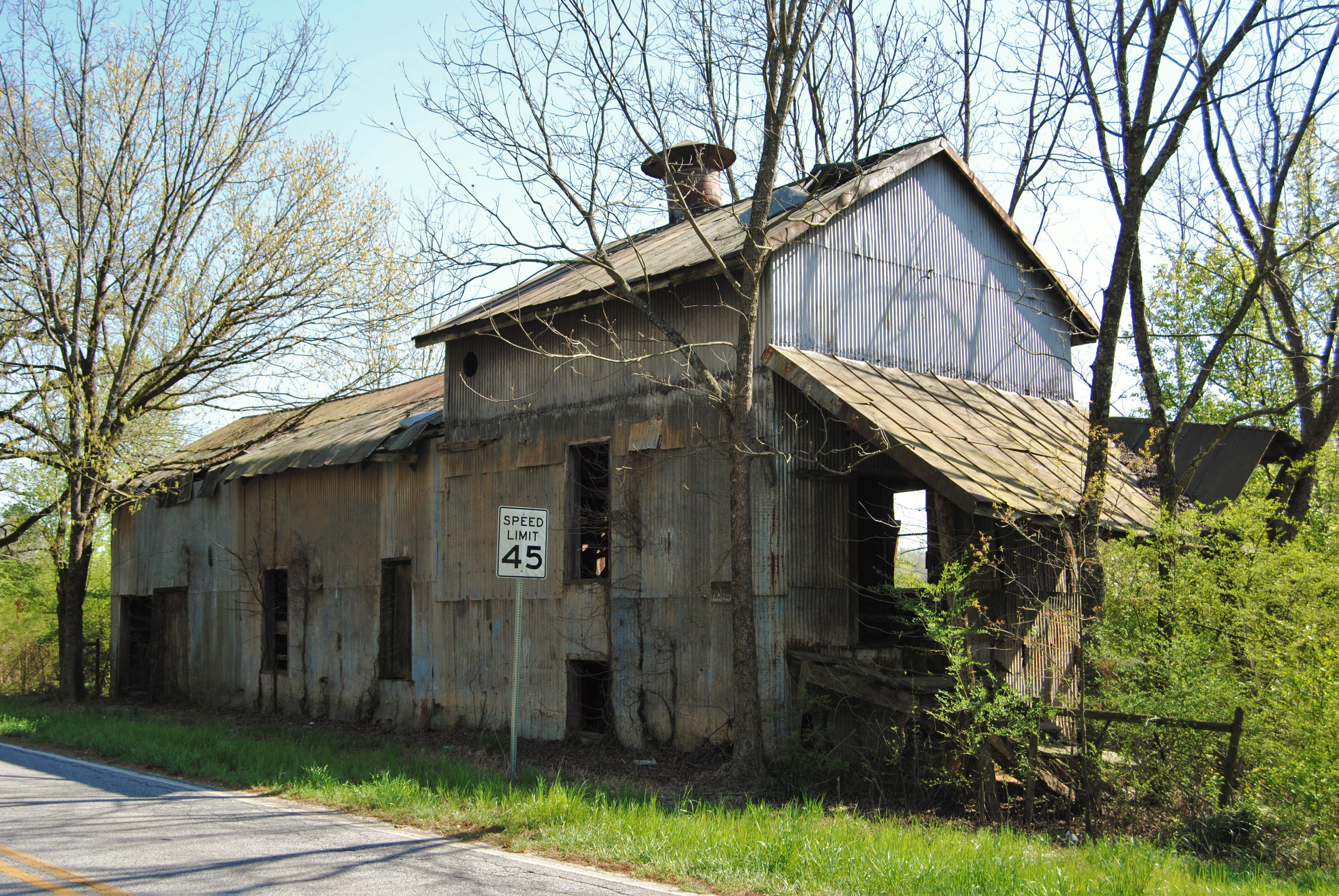

- Location within Georgia
- Nearest city: Bethlehem, Georgia
- Coordinates: 33.5536°N 83.4209°W
- Area: 15 acres (6.1 ha)
- Built: 1887
- NRHP reference No.: 91000541
- Added to NRHP: 8 May 1991

Manning Gin Farm is a historic agricultural property located approximately half a mile southeast of Bethlehem in Barrow County, Georgia. The site comprises a late 19th- and early 20th-century farm complex featuring a circa 1887 I-house, a circa 1905 cotton gin, and a variety of outbuildings from the farm’s historic operations. The property occupies approximately 15 acres and retains a largely rural setting. The farm was established in the late 1800s and operated by the Manning family until 1945. Crops grown on the farm included cotton, corn, wheat, and oats.

== Architecture ==
The farmhouse is a two-story wood-framed I-house with a one-story rear ell. It is clad in weatherboard and has exterior brick chimneys at each end, along with boxed cornices, cornice returns, and corner pilasters. A two-story front porch was added in the early 20th century, with the upper portion rebuilt in 1982. Interior features include a central hall floor plan, pine tongue-and-groove walls and ceilings, original doors, mantels, and flooring.

Outbuildings include a circa 1905 metal-sided cotton gin, a warehouse with clapboard siding and a corrugated metal roof, a grain house and harness barn, a mule barn with stalls and a hay loft, a corn crib, a milk barn, a smokehouse, and separate houses for a cook and maid. Additional structures include outhouses, a tenant building, a chicken house, and a shed. Most outbuildings are wood-framed, unpainted, and rest on stone or concrete piers.
