= South Broad Street Historic District (Rome, Georgia) =

Historic district in Georgia, United States

- U.S. National Register of Historic Places
- Location within Georgia
- Location: S. Broad St. and Etowah Terrace, Rome, Georgia
- Coordinates: 34°14′57″N 85°10′40″W
- Area: 10 acres (4.0 ha)
- Built: 1880
- Built by: Multiple
- Architectural style: Bungalow/craftsman, Late Victorian
- NRHP reference No.: 83004182
- Added to NRHP: August 18, 1983

The South Broad Street Historic District in Rome, Georgia is a 10 acres (4.0 ha) historic district which was listed on the National Register of Historic Places in 1983. The listing included 41 contributing buildings.

It includes large houses on South Broad Street, built of brick and frame, built during 1880 to 1910.
