= National Register of Historic Places listings in Warren County, Georgia =

Location of Warren County in Georgia.

This is a list of properties and districts in Warren County, Georgia that are listed on the National Register of Historic Places (NRHP). There are four current listings, and one former listing.

This National Park Service list is complete through NPS recent listings posted June 6, 2026.

== Current listings ==
	Name on the Register	Image	Date listed	Location	City or town	Description
1	Jewell Historic District	Jewell Historic District	May 14, 1979 (#79003106)	GA 248 and GA 16; 33°17′41″N 82°46′58″W	Jewell	
2	Warren County Courthouse	Warren County Courthouse	September 18, 1980 (#80001259)	Courthouse Sq. 33°24′24″N 82°39′45″W	Warrenton	
3	Warrenton Downtown Historic District	Warrenton Downtown Historic District	April 11, 2002 (#02000340)	Roughly centered on jct. of Main and Depot Sts. 33°24′25″N 82°39′45″W	Warrenton	
4	Warrenton Gymnasium-Auditorium	Warrenton Gymnasium-Auditorium	October 22, 2002 (#02001214)	304 S. Gibson St. 33°24′14″N 82°39′41″W	Warrenton	

== Former listings ==
	Name on the Register	Image	Date listed	Date removed	Location	City or town	Description
1	Roberts-McGregor House		August 14, 1979 (#79000750)	June 11, 2026	Depot St. 33°24′27″N 82°39′44″W	Warrenton	Probably gone
