= West Broad Street Commercial Historic District =

Historic district in Virginia, United States

- U.S. National Register of Historic Places
- U.S. Historic district
- Virginia Landmarks Register
- Location within Virginia Location within the United States
- Location: 1300-1600 West Broad St., Richmond, Virginia
- Coordinates: 37°33′13″N 77°27′21″W
- Area: 5.5 acres (2.2 ha)
- Built: c. 1900
- Architect: Hallett, Marcus A. & Pratt, Roy G.; et al.
- Architectural style: Late 19th And 20th Century Revivals, Late 19th And Early 20th Century American Movements, et al.
- NRHP reference No.: 00001667
- VLR No.: 127-5807

Significant dates
- Added to NRHP: January 16, 2001
- Designated VLR: September 13, 2000

The West Broad Street Commercial Historic District is a national historic district located at Richmond, Virginia. The district encompasses 20 contributing buildings built between about 1900 and the late 1930s. Located in the district is the Forbes Motor Car Company (1919), Harper-Overland Company building (1921), Firestone Building (1929), Engine Company No. 10 Firehouse (c. 1900), and the Saunders Station Post Office (1937). The majority of the buildings are two-to-four stories in height and are composed of brick with stucco, stone and metal detailing. Located in the district is the separately listed The Coliseum-Duplex Envelope Company Building.

It was added to the National Register of Historic Places in 2001.
