= North Broad Street Historic District (Norwich, New York) =

Historic district in New York, United States

- U.S. National Register of Historic Places
- U.S. Historic district
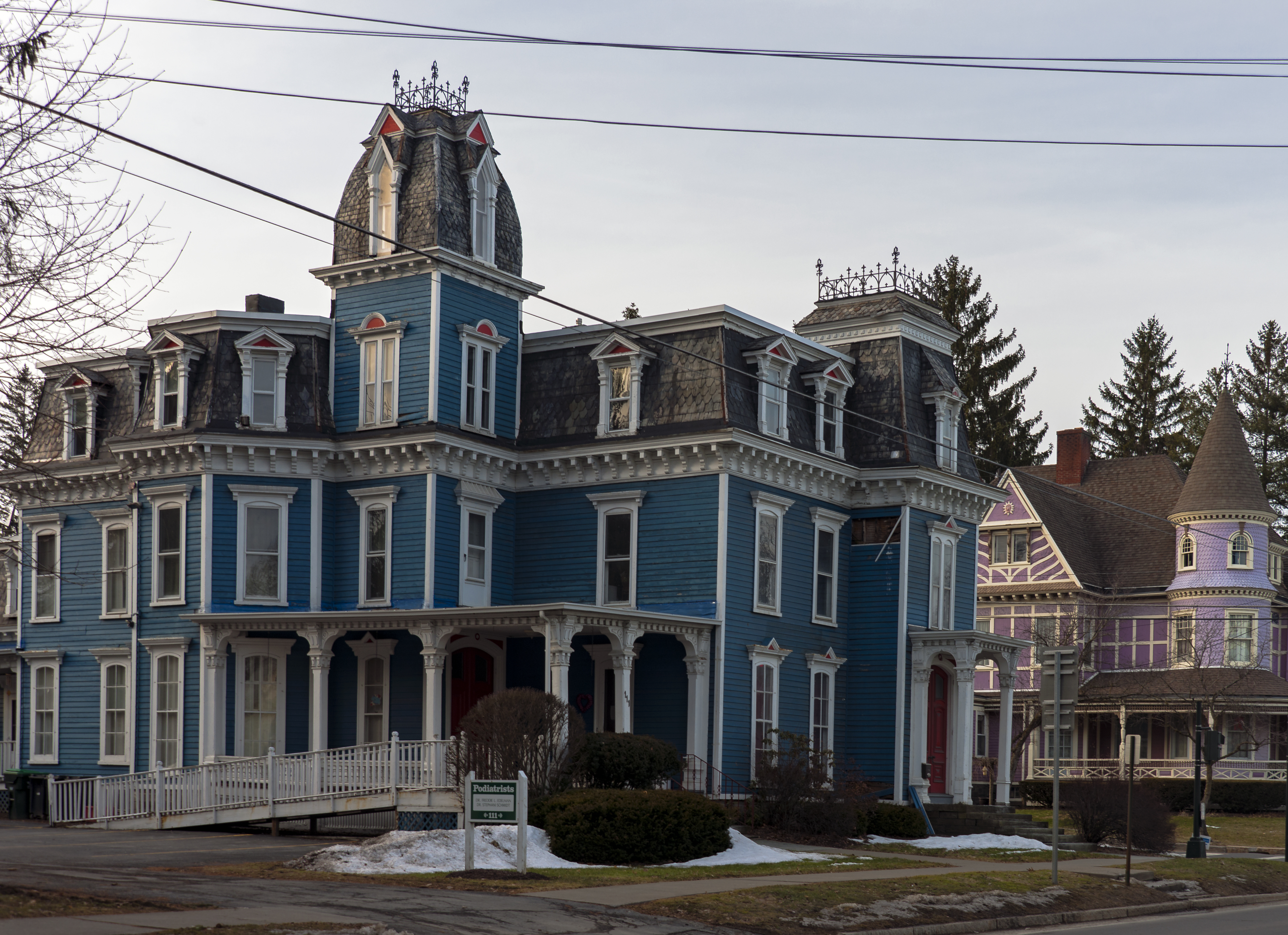
- South profile and east elevations, 111 and 113 North Broad Street, 2019

- Location within New York Location within the United States
- Interactive map showing the location for North Broad Street Historic District
- Location: Broad St., Norwich, New York
- Coordinates: 42°32′14″N 75°31′30″W
- Area: 19.5 acres (7.9 ha)
- Architect: Clark, Archibald
- Architectural style: Greek Revival, Italianate, Queen Anne
- NRHP reference No.: 78001845
- Added to NRHP: November 21, 1978

North Broad Street Historic District is a national historic district located at Norwich in Chenango County, New York. The district has 41 contributing buildings. It includes an area of detached residences in a variety of popular 19th- and 20th-century architectural styles.

It was added to the National Register of Historic Places in 1978.
