= Social Circle Historic District =

Historic district in Georgia, United States

- U.S. National Register of Historic Places
- Location within Georgia
- Location: GA 11 and GA 229, Social Circle, Georgia
- Coordinates: 33°39′19″N 83°43′08″W
- Area: 132 acres (0.53 km^{2})
- Built: 1840
- Architectural style: Greek Revival, Early Commercial, Late Victorian
- NRHP reference No.: 80001257
- Added to NRHP: March 27, 1980

The Social Circle Historic District is a 132 acres (0.53 km^{2}) historic district in Social Circle, Georgia. It was listed on the National Register of Historic Places in 1980. The listing included 200 contributing buildings.

It includes Greek Revival, Early Commercial, and Late Victorian architecture.

It includes the Social Circle Cotton Mill, built in 1901 and bricked up in 1972.

It includes the Josiah Clark Town House, believed to be the oldest building in Social Circle, a Plantation Plain or "I" House style building.
