= National Register of Historic Places listings in Treutlen County, Georgia =

This is a list of properties and districts in Treutlen County, Georgia that are listed on the National Register of Historic Places (NRHP).

This National Park Service list is complete through NPS recent listings posted March 21, 2025.

== Current listings ==
	Name on the Register	Image	Date listed	Location	City or town	Description
1	Treutlen County Courthouse	Treutlen County Courthouse	September 18, 1980 (#80001246)	Courthouse Sq. 32°22′38″N 82°35′36″W	Soperton	
