= Carlyle-Blakey Farm =

- U.S. National Register of Historic Places
- Location within Georgia
- Nearest city: Winder, Georgia
- Coordinates: 34°00′40″N 83°45′27″W
- Area: 129 acres (0.52 km^{2})
- Built: 1948
- NRHP reference No.: 08000353
- Added to NRHP: April 29, 2008

The Carlyle-Blakey Farm, in Barrow County, Georgia near Winder, Georgia, was listed on the National Register of Historic Places in 2008. It is notable as the site of a prominent agricultural reform demonstration in 1948, which addressed a huge problem in Georgia agriculture. This was that few Georgia farmers terraced their fields or rotated crops, leading to severe erosion. An extreme example was the development of what became known as the Providence Canyon, from growth of a farm gully into a 150-foot-deep canyon, even becoming a state park.

The farm is notable for the unusual event on May 12, 1948:

"when the farm (then 168 acres) was chosen as the site of a Master Conservation Field Day. Sponsored by the Oconee River Soil Conservation District, The Atlanta Journal, and the Civic Clubs of Winder, this massive one-day effort involving hundreds of men and machines transformed the badly eroded and depleted farm into a model of efficient and productive land management. The fence lines and re-configured demarcations for cropland, pasture, woodland, house lots, and ponds are all still starkly evident on aerial views today. The terracing from 1948 can be seen on the ground in several of the fields on the western half of the property. Most of the buildings and structures are clustered near the road and the 1.75-acre pond in the northeast quadrant of the property. These include the Blakey's mid-20th-century house (non-contributing due to major alterations), two barns, two sheds, a chicken house, a creek-side baptismal pool, and a small pump house. A metal utility barn/equipment shed is the sole building that was constructed during the conservation field day, and is therefore the only contributing resource other than the site itself. The southeast corner of the nominated property is now a separately owned 10-acre parcel (the "Chaney lot" on the sketch map) with a non-historic house, two outbuildings and a 3/4-acre pond. While this small parcel has modern buildings, its major historic landscape elements from 1948 remain essentially intact. The entire property still maintains its rural character, in contrast to some of the tract housing development around the periphery."

The one contributing building is a metal barn built on that day. The contributing site is the transformed farm, now with gullies filled in and terracing.

It is located at 568 GA 211 NW, on the west side of Thompson Hill Road (Highway 211), 568 Georgia State Highway 211, Northwest, about 3 miles (4.8 km) northwest of Winder. It was a rural area in 1948, but by 2009 the area around the farm was being developed.
