= South Madison Avenue-Pannell Road Historic District =

Historic district in Georgia, United States

- U.S. National Register of Historic Places
- Location within Georgia
- Location: S. Madison Ave. and Pannell Rd., Monroe, Georgia
- Coordinates: 33°46′35″N 83°42′00″W
- Area: 12 acres (4.9 ha)
- MPS: Monroe MRA
- NRHP reference No.: 83003621
- Added to NRHP: December 28, 1983

The South Madison Avenue-Pannell Road Historic District in Monroe, Georgia, United States, is a 12 acres (4.9 ha) historic district which was listed on the National Register of Historic Places in 1983. The listing included eight contributing buildings.

The area developed as a small country hamlet, outside Monroe. Most of the buildings were built before 1910.
