= Raburn-Casteel House =

Historic house in Georgia, United States

- Raburn--Casteel House
- U.S. National Register of Historic Places
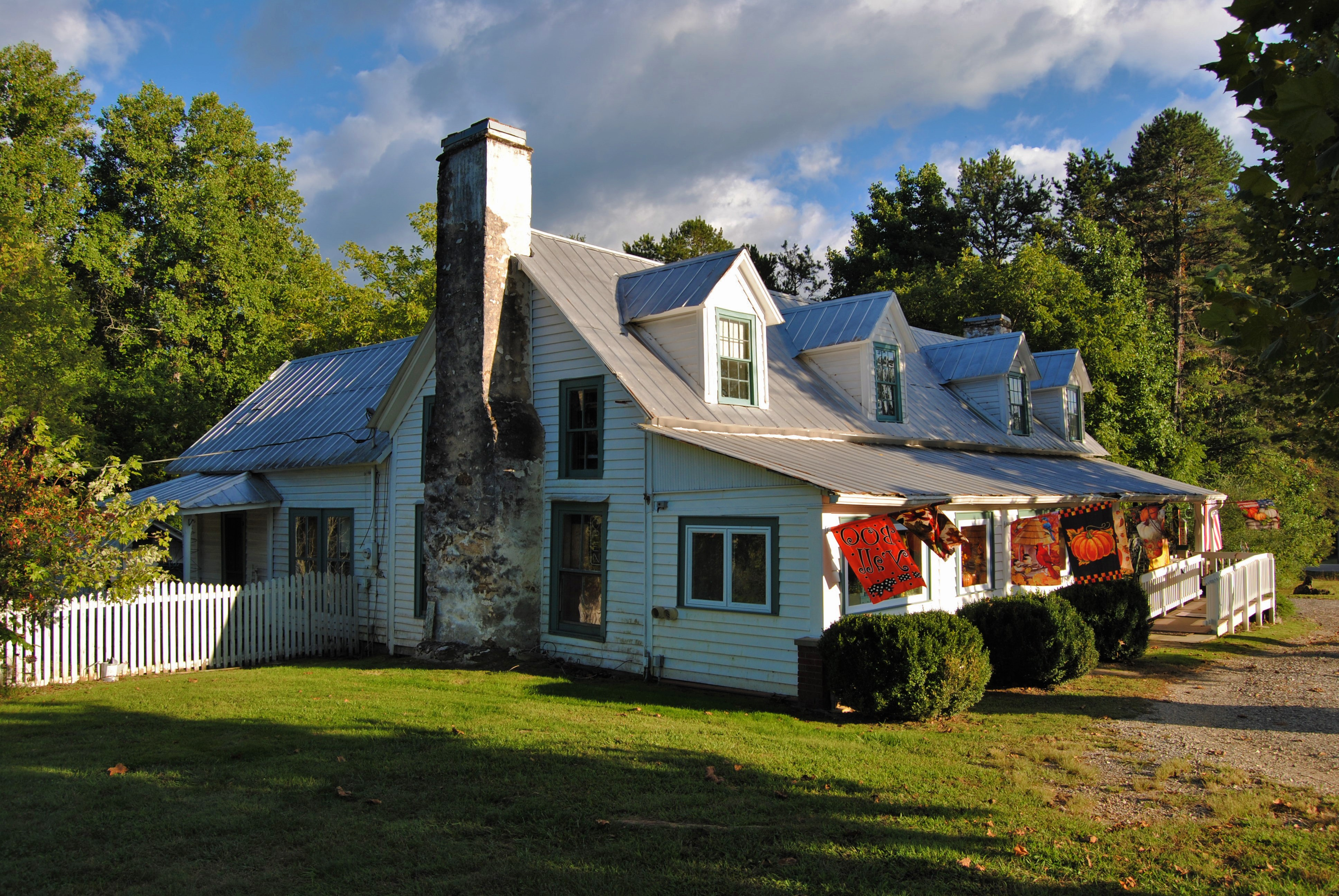

- Location within Georgia Location within the United States
- Location: US 129, 4 mi. N. of Blairsville, Georgia
- Coordinates: 34°54′29″N 84°0′36″W
- Area: 1 acre (0.40 ha)
- Built: 1885, c.1885-1913
- Built by: Raburn, Hodge; Colwell, Andy
- Architectural style: Hall-parlor, Single-pen
- NRHP reference No.: 01001181
- Added to NRHP: October 26, 2001

The Raburn-Casteel House, about 4 miles (6.4 km) north of Blairsville in Union County, Georgia is listed on the National Register of Historic Places.

Its original section, the northern end, was built c.1885 by Hodge Raburn, as a one-and-a-half-story hall-parlor-type log house. It has a single pen addition attached to the rear of the original house, added between c.1885 and 1913.

It was added to the National Register in 2001.
