= South Broad Street Row =

Historic houses in North Carolina, United States

- U.S. National Register of Historic Places
- U.S. Historic district
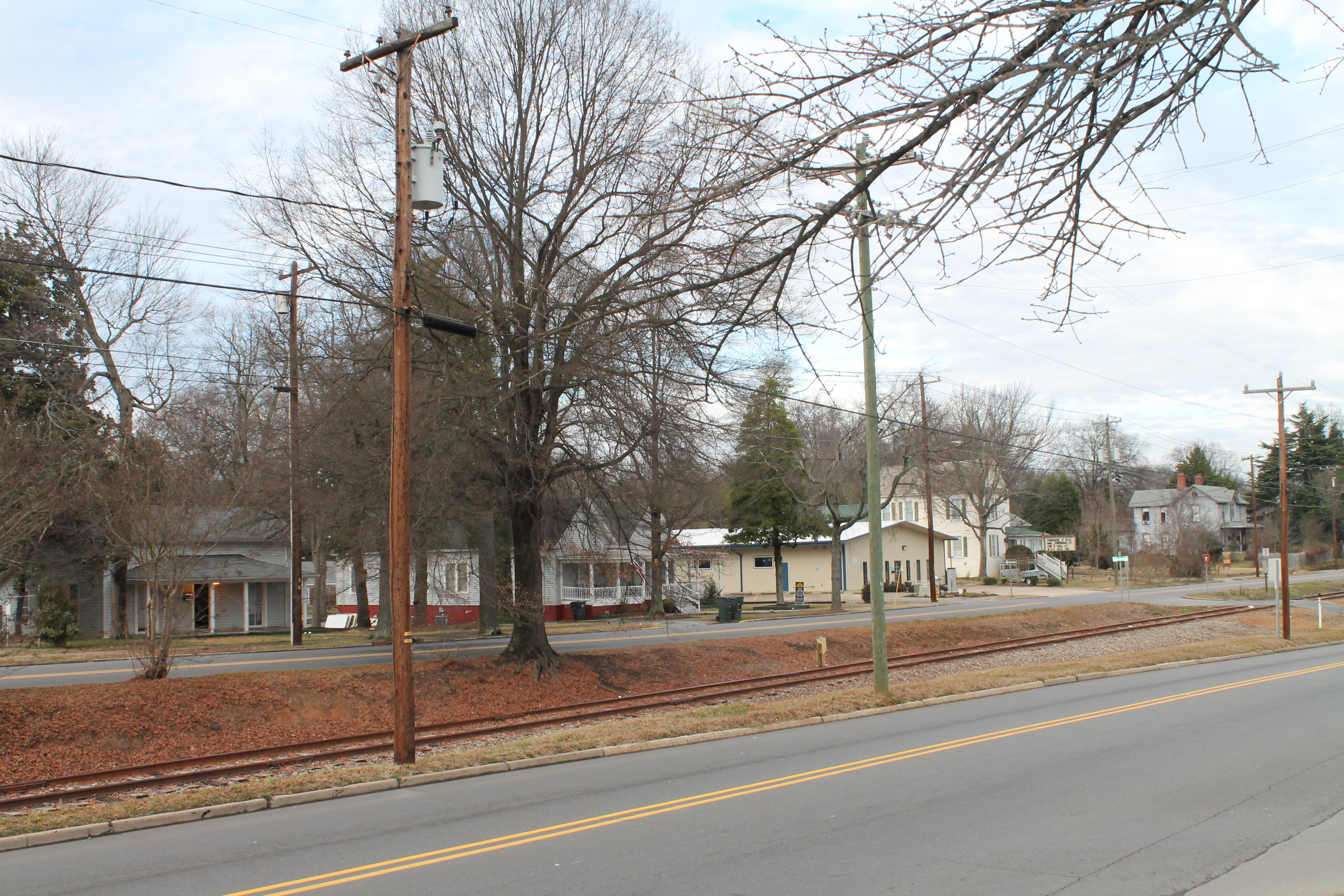

- Location within North Carolina Location within the United States
- Location: 251-311 S. Broad St., Mooresville, North Carolina
- Coordinates: 35°34′50″N 80°49′1″W
- Area: 3.3 acres (1.3 ha)
- Architectural style: Late Victorian
- MPS: Iredell County MRA
- NRHP reference No.: 80002862
- Added to NRHP: November 24, 1980

South Broad Street Row is a national historic district located at Mooresville, Iredell County, North Carolina. It encompasses six contributing buildings in a predominantly residential section of Mooresville, with notable examples of Late Victorian style architecture. They are the former First Presbyterian Church Manse (1891), Dr. James Young House (c. 1890), Tom Hall House (c. 1895), John Pinkney Mills House, J. Frank Brawley House (c. 1914), and the Johnston Family House.

It was listed on the National Register of Historic Places in 1980.
