= Tom Chick House =

- U.S. National Register of Historic Places
- Location within Georgia
- Location: 1102 E. Church St., Monroe, Georgia
- Coordinates: 33°47′23″N 83°41′40″W
- Area: 22 acres (8.9 ha)
- Built: 1907
- Built by: Weldon, W. D.
- MPS: Monroe MRA
- NRHP reference No.: 83003610
- Added to NRHP: December 28, 1983

The Tom Chick House, in Monroe, Georgia, was built in 1907. Also known as the Chick-Gower-Braswell House, it was listed on the National Register of Historic Places in 1983.

It is a two-story frame house with brick chimneys. It has a one-story porch wrapping around its west west side. It was deemed notable as "a good example of early twentieth century architecture built for a middle class family that was moving into the city. Although the location is considered "in the country", it was close enough to Monroe for the children to take advantage of the city schools. The house was built by local contractors, probably using basic patterns and plans. In its massing, details, and style, it is typical of the architecture of the early 1900s. It is also significant as one of only a few examples in Monroe of a "farmhouse" in the city. Most of the city's development came out from the center of town, and few examples remain of late nineteenth century and early twentieth century farm development. 1102 East Church Street is one such house still in the city, and it is important as a rare example of this house type."
