= West Broad Street Historic District (Darlington, South Carolina) =

Historic district in South Carolina, United States

- U.S. National Register of Historic Places
- U.S. Historic district
- Location within South Carolina Location within the United States
- Location: W. Broad St. between Dargan St. and Player St., Darlington, South Carolina
- Coordinates: 34°17′49″N 79°52′26″W
- Area: 30 acres (12 ha)
- Built: c. 1890-1928
- Built by: Reese, Lawrence
- Architectural style: Queen Anne
- MPS: City of Darlington MRA
- NRHP reference No.: 88000063
- Added to NRHP: February 10, 1988

West Broad Street Historic District is a national historic district located at Darlington, Darlington County, South Carolina. The district encompasses 36 contributing buildings in a primarily residential section of Darlington. They were constructed between about 1890 and 1928. Most of the residences are grand in scale and reflect the prosperity of the individuals who built them. Several of the houses were owned by some of Darlington's most prominent citizens. Most of the residences are large, two-story frame Victorian or Queen Anne structures with decorative woodwork. The dwellings are set on deep lots that are planted with large trees and shrubs. A number of these large residences are similar in appearance and were built by master carpenter Lawrence Reese. Also included in the district are 13 modest, one-story frame houses with a few decorative features, as well as two imposing brick bungalows.

It was listed on the National Register of Historic Places in 1988.
