= Alfred E. Burk House =

- Location within Philadelphia Location within Pennsylvania Location within the United States
- 39°58′34″N 75°09′32″W
- Location: 1500 North Broad Street, Philadelphia 19121

History
- Built: 1907–1909

Site notes
- Architectural style: Renaissance Revival Architecture
- Owner: Alfred E. Burk (original), Temple University (current)

Philadelphia Register of Historic Places
- Official name: Alfred Edward Burk Mansion, Temple University
- Designated: January 26, 1971

The Alfred E. Burk House, colloquially known as the Burk Mansion, is a Gilded Age late Victorian Italian Renaissance style house located at 1500 North Broad Street in Philadelphia, Pennsylvania now owned by Temple University. Designed by architects Edward P. Simon & David B. Basset and constructed between 1907 and 1909, the building was later altered and enlarged by Louis A. Manfredi first in 1949 and later in 1953. The house was initially commissioned and inhabited by industrialist and leather manufacturer Alfred E. Burk from 1909 until his death in 1921. From 1945 to 1970, the house served as the headquarters for the Upholsterers International Union of North America, an AFL-affiliated labor union of upholsters and textile workers, among others. In 1971, it was acquired by Temple University’s School of Social Administration. Temple University used the property as a daycare for faculty, staff, and students until its closure in 1995. The building currently sits unoccupied.

== History ==
=== Alfred E. Burk ===
The Burk Family originated from Knittlingen, Württemberg, Germany. The parents of Alfred E. Burk were David and Charlotte Reinman Burk who had eight children. The family emigrated to the United States in 1854 and settled in Philadelphia, PA. Alfred E. Burk, along with his two brothers Henry and Charles, started the Burk Brothers Company which specialized in the production of glazed-kid leather. Their factory complex was located at 919-961 North 3rd Street in Philadelphia in the old leather district and was sold after the death of Henry Burk in 1903. The complex consisted of 12 interconnected brick and reinforced concrete buildings and continued to produce leather products until it was demolished in the mid-20th century. It was added to the National Register of Historic Places in 1985. Alfred E. Burk was a prominent industrialist and politician. Along with his shared company Burk Brothers, he also developed and owned the Garden Pier in Atlantic City, New Jersey with his brother Louis. Burk was a delegate to Republican National Convention from Pennsylvania in 1920. He was also a Freemason. He died in Philadelphia, Philadelphia County, Pa., May 13, 1921 (age 56 years, 189 days).

=== Industrial development ===
Between 1945 and 1971, the Alfred E. Burk house served as the headquarters of the Upholsters' International Union (UIU). Founded in 1892, the UIU represented workers within industries such as caskets, mattress and bedding, furniture, window trimming and display installation. In the late 19th century North Broad Street in Philadelphia developed into a boulevard for the industrial wealthy. It was a convenient location for two reasons. First, many of their production places were located in adjoining industrial areas; a North Broad Street residence gave its entrepreneurial owner access to his thriving business, as well as the comforts of a rich social life.

=== Temple University ===
Temple University bought the 27-room Alfred E. Burk House in 1970 – the year before the building was added to the Philadelphia Register of Historic Places. The university purchased the building from the Upholsters’ International Union of North America for $375,000. Within one year of its acquisition, the building became the home of the recently created School of Social Administration. In 1975, the university moved its daycare program into the mansion’s carriage house. This daycare served the children of Temple students and employees for nearly twenty years until a July 1993 mechanical fire in the house forced the relocation of both the daycare program and the School of Social Administration. The fire caused an estimated $2.8 million worth of damages, and coupled with the declining state of appropriations from the Commonwealth for the upkeep of the mansion, led to Temple officials closing the house in 1995. The building has remained empty ever since.

== Future of the Mansion ==
The Burk House currently stands empty and unused, vacant since 1995. Temple University released a Master Plan that makes no mention of the Burk House property, so speculation continues as to its future. Shortly before the 2008 economic crisis, Temple planned to use the building to house its Honors program, according to Ray Betzner, Temple’s assistant vice president of university communications. The economic crash put an end to the $44 million project before it began. In 2015, an image circulated of a proposed hotel at the site, sparking further questions as to Temple’s plans for the building. Temple architect Margaret Carney refuted the rumor that Temple planned to demolish, noting that over a million dollars had recently been invested in stabilizing the mansion’s roof, and that new lights, heating, and ventilation had been installed. According to Philadelphia Historical Commission executive director Jon Farnham, as of 2015 Temple University had not submitted a demolition application for the site.
