= North Broad Street Residential Historic District =

Historic district in Georgia, United States

- U.S. National Register of Historic Places
- U.S. Historic district
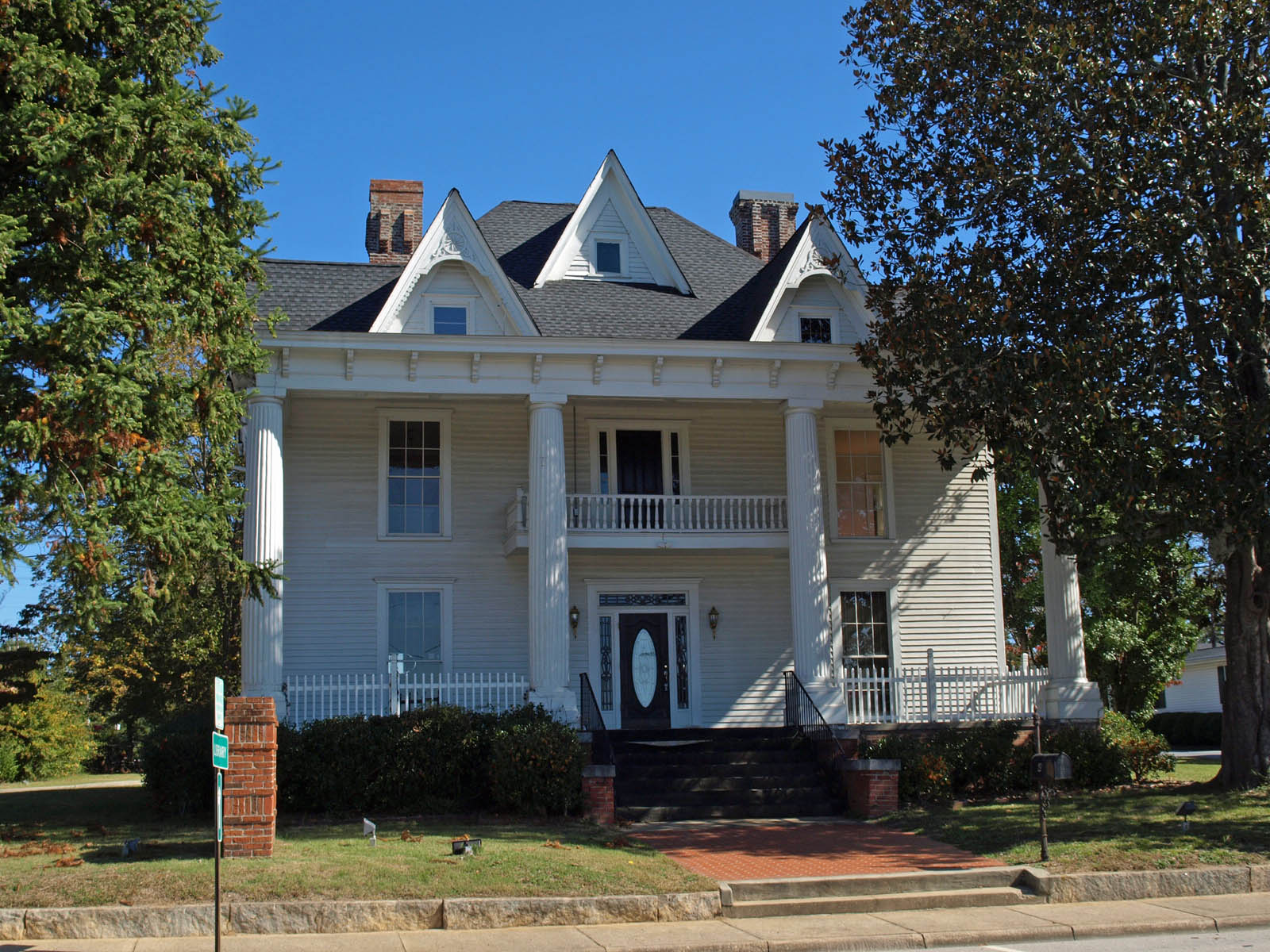
- House at 41 West Candler Street

- Location within Georgia Location within the United States
- Location: Roughly bounded by Woodlawn Ave., Center, Broad, and Stephens Sts., Winder, Georgia
- Coordinates: 33°59′43″N 83°43′6″W
- Area: 18 acres (7.3 ha)
- Architect: Multiple
- Architectural style: Late 19th And 20th Century Revivals, Late Victorian, Bungalow
- NRHP reference No.: 84000888
- Added to NRHP: July 26, 1984

The North Broad Street Residential Historic District is an 18-acre (7.3 ha) historic district in Winder, Georgia. It was listed on the National Register of Historic Places in 1984 and includes 39 contributing buildings.

The district addresses historic buildings from the 1890s to 1930s; there are also modern intrusions.

The district includes the Smith-Baxter House, built in 1902, which has a large porch, decorative scrollwork, and stained glass. The First Baptist Church in the district is a "good example of the use of the Gothic style for a church." The majority of houses are Bungalow style. The district is also significant for its residential landscape architecture.
