= North Broad Street Historic District (Monroe, Georgia) =

Historic district in Georgia, United States

- U.S. National Register of Historic Places
- U.S. Historic district
- Location within Georgia Location within the United States
- Location: N. Broad and Walton Sts., Monroe, Georgia
- Coordinates: 33°47′50″N 83°42′54″W
- Area: 55 acres (22 ha)
- Architect: Multiple; Hammock, Benjamin
- Architectural style: Late 19th And 20th Century Revivals, Late Victorian
- MPS: Monroe MRA
- NRHP reference No.: 83003623
- Added to NRHP: December 28, 1983

The North Broad Street Historic District in Monroe, Georgia is a 55 acres (22 ha) historic district which was listed on the National Register of Historic Places in 1983. The listing included 56 contributing buildings.

It includes the Davis Edwards House, which is separately listed on the National Register.
