= South Broad Street Historic District (Monroe, Georgia) =

Historic district in Georgia, United States

- U.S. National Register of Historic Places
- Location within Georgia
- Location: S. Broad St., Monroe, Georgia
- Coordinates: 33°47′20″N 83°42′40″W
- Area: 15 acres (6.1 ha)
- Architect: Thomas Snow
- Architectural style: Classical Revival, Late Victorian, Plantation Plain
- MPS: Monroe MRA
- NRHP reference No.: 83003620
- Added to NRHP: December 28, 1983

The South Broad Street Historic District in Monroe, Georgia is a 15 acres (6.1 ha) historic district which was listed on the National Register of Historic Places in 1983. The listing included 14 contributing buildings.

The largest properties are the Walker-FieIds House and the Wright-Henson House; the oldest is the John Felker House, which has elements of both Plantation Plain and American Gothic architecture.
