= Old Union County Jail (Blairsville, Georgia) =

- Union County Jail
- U.S. National Register of Historic Places
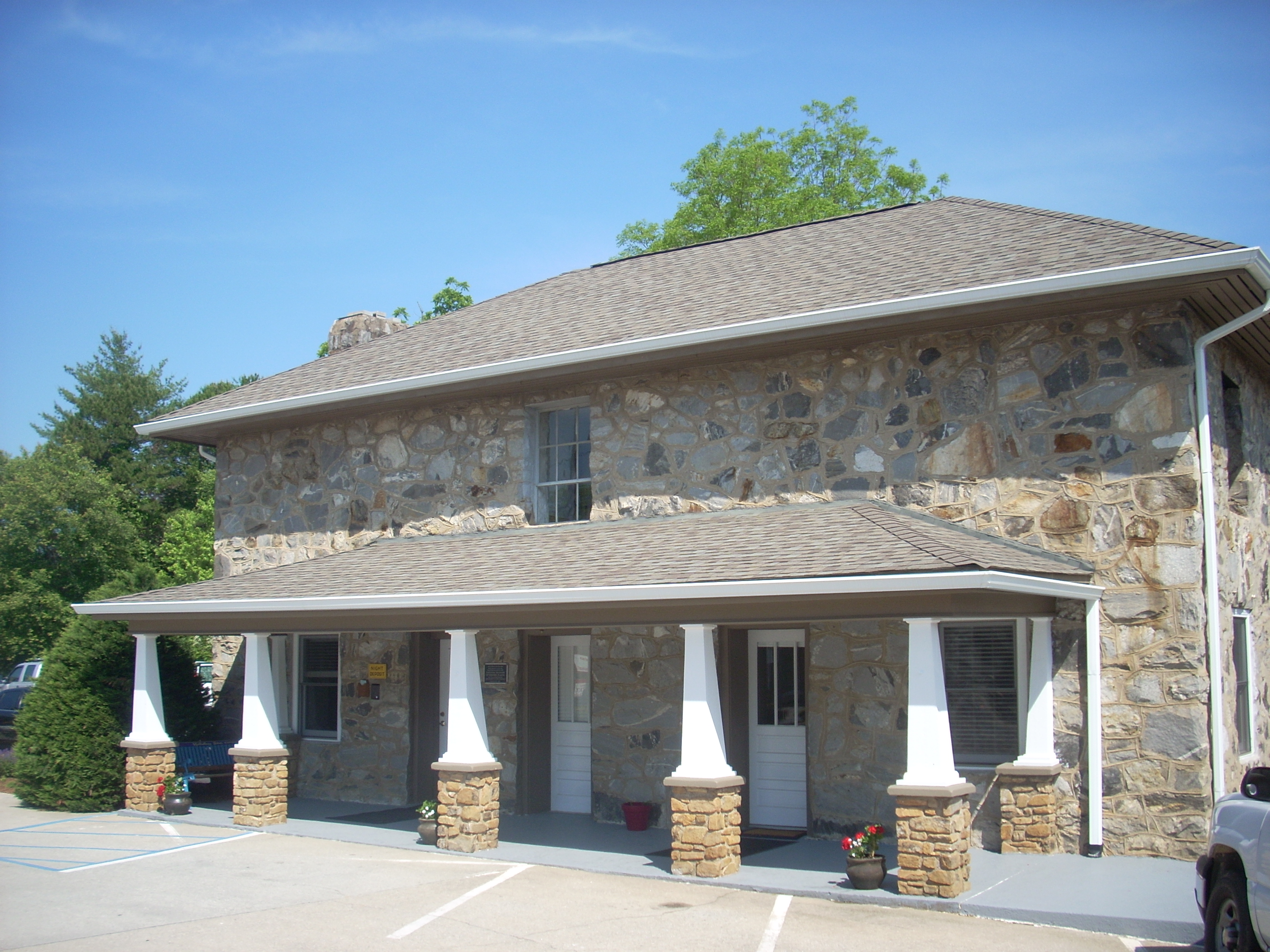

- Location within Georgia Location within the United States
- Location: Blue Ridge Rd., Blairsville, Georgia
- Coordinates: 34°52′33″N 83°57′36″W
- Area: less than one acre
- Built: 1934
- MPS: County Jails of the Georgia Mountains Area TR
- NRHP reference No.: 85002088
- Added to NRHP: September 13, 1985

The Union County Jail, also known as Old Union County Jail, in Blairsville, Georgia was built in 1934, a block away from Union County's historic courthouse. It was listed on the National Register of Historic Places in 1985.

It is a two-story building with a hipped roof and a one-story porch across its front facade. It is built of rock with, on the front facade, raised mortar. The porch is held up by square wood columns upon rock piers.

It served as Union County's jail until the 1970s, when a joint jail shared with Towns County was built. As of 1984, the building held the Blairsville City Hall and also the town's Chamber of Commerce office.

It was one of seven county jails reviewed for National Register listing in 1985.
