= Satilla =

Satilla may refer to:

- The Satilla River in Georgia in the United States
- The Little Satilla River in Georgia in the United States, one of two rivers with this name:
  - The Little Satilla River (Satilla River), a tributary of the Satilla River
  - The Little Satilla River (Atlantic Ocean), not a tributary of the Satilla River
- Big Satilla Creek, a tributary of the Little Satilla River (Satilla River tributary)
- Little Satilla Creek, a tributary of the Little Satilla River (Satilla River tributary)
- USS Satilla (SP-687), a United States Navy patrol vessel in commission from 1917 to 1919
