= Little Satilla River =

Little Satilla River may refer to:

- The Little Satilla River (Satilla River), a tributary of the Satilla River in Georgia in the United States
- The Little Satilla River (Atlantic Ocean) in Georgia in the United States, not a tributary of the Satilla River

== See also ==
- Satilla River
- Little Satilla Creek
