= Appling County School District =

School district in Georgia (U.S. state)

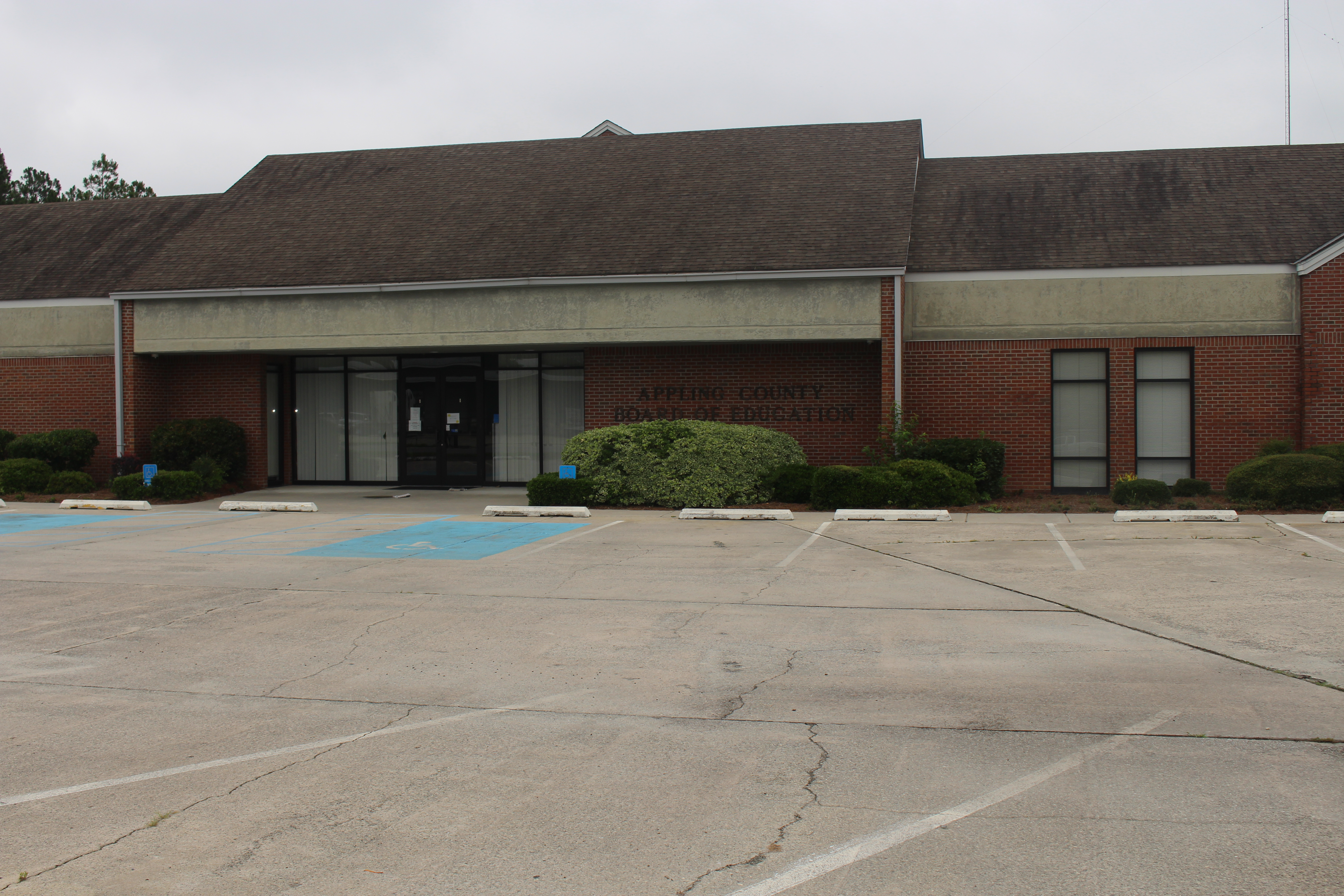

Address
- 249 Blackshear Highway Baxley, Georgia, 31513; United States
- Coordinates: 31.745613°N 82.349032°W

District information
- Grades: Pre-school - 12
- Superintendent: Janet Goodman
- NCES District ID: 1300060

Students and staff
- Enrollment: 3,303
- Faculty: 210

Other information
- Accreditation: Southern Association of Colleges and Schools; Georgia Accrediting Commission
- Fax: (912) 367-1011
- Website: www.appling.k12.ga.us

The Appling County School District is a public school district in Appling County, Georgia, United States, based in Baxley. It serves the communities of Baxley, Graham, and Surrency.

== Schools ==
The Appling County School District has four elementary schools, one middle school, and one high school.

=== Elementary schools ===
- Altamaha Elementary School
- Appling County Primary School
- Appling County Elementary School
- Fourth District Elementary School

=== Middle school ===
- Appling County Middle School

=== High school ===
- Appling County High School

== Rules ==
No phones allowed from 7:30 a.m. to 2:55 p.m. Monday-Friday
