= National Register of Historic Places listings in Appling County, Georgia =

This is a list of properties and districts in Appling County, Georgia that are listed on the National Register of Historic Places (NRHP).

This National Park Service list is complete through NPS recent listings posted December 19, 2025.

== Current listings ==
	Name on the Register	Image	Date listed	Location	City or town	Description
1	Appling County Courthouse	Appling County Courthouse	September 18, 1980 (#80000965)	Courthouse Sq. 31°46′41″N 82°20′57″W	Baxley	Built in 1908
2	Bank of Surrency	Bank of Surrency	January 31, 2003 (#02001742)	80 Hart St. 31°43′29″N 82°11′55″W	Surrency	Built in 1911, was used as city hall as of 2007
3	Citizens Banking Company	Citizens Banking Company	May 2, 1985 (#85000932)	112-116 N. Main St. 31°46′39″N 82°20′56″W	Baxley	Built in 1911
4	C. W. Deen House	C. W. Deen House	September 30, 1982 (#82002381)	413 N. Main St. 31°46′51″N 82°20′54″W	Baxley	Built between 1894 and 1897
5	United States Post Office-Baxley, Georgia	United States Post Office-Baxley, Georgia	July 5, 2000 (#00000755)	124 Tippins St. 31°46′41″N 82°21′00″W	Baxley	Built in 1935/36, now used for the magistrate court
