= Holmesville =

Holmesville is the name of several places:

In Australia

- Holmesville, New South Wales

In the United States

- Holmesville, Georgia
- Holmesville, Indiana
- Holmesville, Mississippi
- Holmesville, Nebraska
- Holmesville, New York
- Holmesville, Ohio
- Holmesville Township, Minnesota
