= Appling County High School =

Public school in Georgia, United States

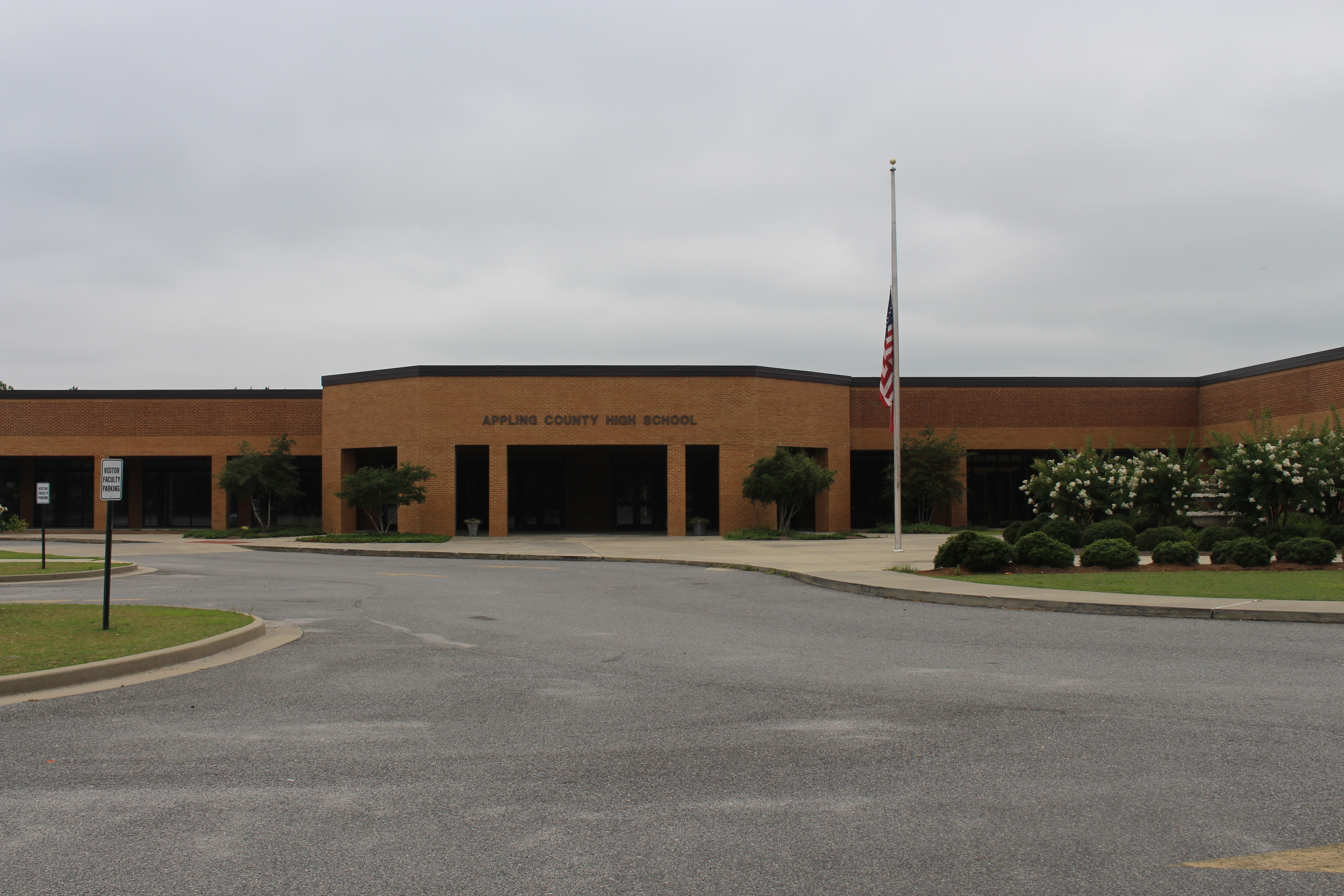
- Welcome to the Pirate's Plank

Location
- 482 Blackshear Highway; Baxley, Georgia 31513; United States
- Coordinates: 31.76346°N 82.35460°W

Information
- School type: Public high school
- Established: 1955
- School district: Appling County School District
- CEEB code: 110365
- Principal: Ben Horner
- Teaching staff: 67.50 (on an FTE basis)
- Grades: 9–12
- Enrollment: 1,053 (2023–2024)
- Student to teacher ratio: 15.60
- Colors: Red, white, black
- Athletics conference: 3-AA
- Sports: Football, wrestling, tennis, golf, softball, baseball, track, cross-country, basketball, competition cheer
- Mascot: Pirate
- Team name: Pirates
- Rival: Pierce
- Accreditation: Southern Association of Colleges and Schools
- Newspaper: Baxley News Banner
- Website: achs.appling.k12.ga.us

Appling County High School (formerly known as Appling County Comprehensive High School) is a high school in Baxley, Appling County, Georgia, United States. It is part of the Appling County School District.

It has approximately 1,002 students and 70 teachers in grades 9-12. The students are 66% white, 30% African-American, and 4% Hispanic. 62% of the school's students are eligible for free lunch, above the state average of 50%.

== Academics ==
The average ACT score at Appling County was 18, lower than the Georgia state average of 20 and the national average of 21.

== Notable alumni ==
- Byron Buxton ('12), MLB outfielder for the Minnesota Twins
- Dexter Carter, former professional football player
- Frankie King, NBA guard for Los Angeles Lakers (1995); born in Baxley
- Jamie Nails, NFL guard for Buffalo Bills (1997–2000) and Miami Dolphins (2002–2003); born in Baxley
- Carl Simpson, defensive tackle for Chicago Bears (1993–1997), Arizona Cardinals (1998–1999), and Las Vegas Outlaws (2001)
- Harry Skipper, defensive back in the CFL for seven years; played for the Montreal Concordes and Saskatchewan Roughriders 1983–1989
