= The Baxley News-Banner =

- Type: Daily newspaper
- Owner: Jamie Gardner
- Founder: Warren P. Ward
- Editor: Jamie Gardner
- Founded: 1884
- Language: English
- Headquarters: Baxley, Georgia
- Website: www.baxleynewsbanner.com

The Baxley News-Banner is a newspaper published in Baxley & Appling County, Georgia. The newspaper is owned by Jamie Gardner and prints weekly.

== History ==
In 1884, Warren P. Ward of Douglas decided to start the Baxley Banner. Currently, the Baxley News-Banner is the oldest business in Baxley, Georgia. Beginning in 1885, the News-Banner began to receive the majority of the county's official notices. After gaining tremendous credibility, the Baxley Banner decided to purchase the Appling County News from A.M. Cool in 1902. The name of the Appling County News was then changed to its current name, the Baxley News-Banner. After about four decades, the News-Banner decided to expand again with the purchase of the Baxley Herald from Carr McLemore. The News Banner has had many editors including Warren P. Ward, John C. Geiger, J.H. Thomas, Julius King, N.L. Stafford, George D. Lowe from 1897-1902. In the October 13th, 1927 issue of the newspaper, a new owner, Ulmer L. Cox, was named. He sold it to J.E. Baynard in August 1941. Baynard then sold it to Albert S. Jenkins in the December of that same year. In 1977, Jenkins sold it to the Community Newspaper Services, Inc. which resulted in Max Garder being able to purchase some shares. In 1981, Garder and his wife, Helen, purchased the newspaper and became the editors and publishers until they sold the company to their son, Jamie Garder, in 2007. Jamie Garder is still the current owner of the Baxley News-Banner as well as the Charlton County Herald. The Baxley News-Banner accounts winning numerous awards for dedication and excellence in news reporting, photography, editorial content, advertising layout and design, and more; however, there are no references on what these awards are.

== Coverage ==
The Baxley News-Banner publishes its articles weekly on Wednesdays. It offers run of paper advertising. It reports on news that occurs in Baxley, GA or Appling County, GA. Additionally, if people who are originally from either of those places, they will report on them as well. Originally, . The News-Banner reports on various topics such as sports, daily news, obituaries, weddings, births, anniversaries, and more to keep their readers informed of what is occurring in their community. The Baxley News-Banner also allows citizens to submit different events that are occurring to further community engagement.

== Editors ==
The first editor of the Baxley News-Banner was Warren P. Ward in 1884. Mr. Ward was the founder of the Baxley Banner which later became the Baxley News-Banner. From 1897-1902, the editors were John C. Geiger, J.H. Thomas, Julius King, N.L. Stafford, and George D. Lowe. In 1902, the editors were Charles H. Parker and John C. Bennett. From 1902-1909, the main editor was Wade M. Shepherd. Dave Parker then took over from 1909-1910. In 1912, the Baxley Banner became the Baxley News-Banner Marvin N. Dickinson as editor from until 1918 when Walter E. Bradely took over as editor and publisher until 1927. In late October 1927, the News-Banner was sold and H.A. Watts became the new editor. In 1941, ownership switched twice with J.E. Baynard as editor and owner from August to December where Albert S. Jenkins took ownership until 1977 when he sold it to Community Newspaper Services. Max Gardner, a stock holder in the Community Newspaper Services, and his wife purchased the newspaper in 1981 and were the editors until 2007 when they sold it to their son Jamie Gardner who serves as the current editor.
