= Big Satilla Creek =

Coordinates: 31.45466°N 82.05262°W

Location
- Country: United States

Physical characteristics
- Source
  - location: Georgia

Big Satilla Creek is a 55.8-mile-long (89.8 km) tributary of the Little Satilla River in the U.S. state of Georgia. It is part of the Satilla River watershed of southeastern Georgia.

The creek rises in Hazlehurst in Jeff Davis County and flows south, then southeast. After leaving Jeff Davis County, it forms the boundary between Appling and Bacon counties, then Appling and Pierce counties, and finally Wayne and Pierce counties. It joins Little Satilla Creek southwest of Screven to form the Little Satilla River.

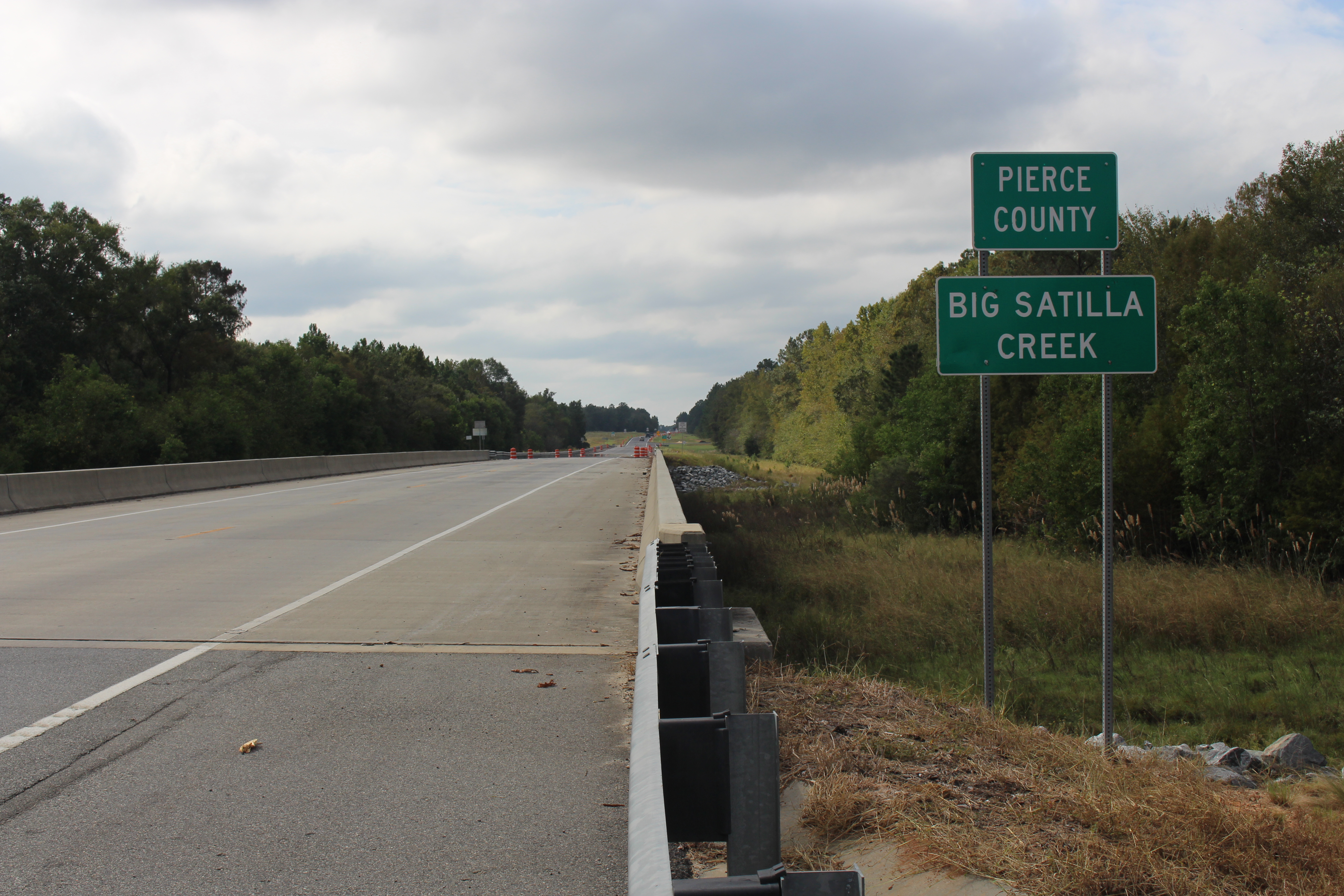
Big Satilla Creek crossing on GA15/GA121 between Appling and Pierce County

== See also ==
- List of rivers of Georgia
