= Byron Buxton =

American baseball player (born 1993)

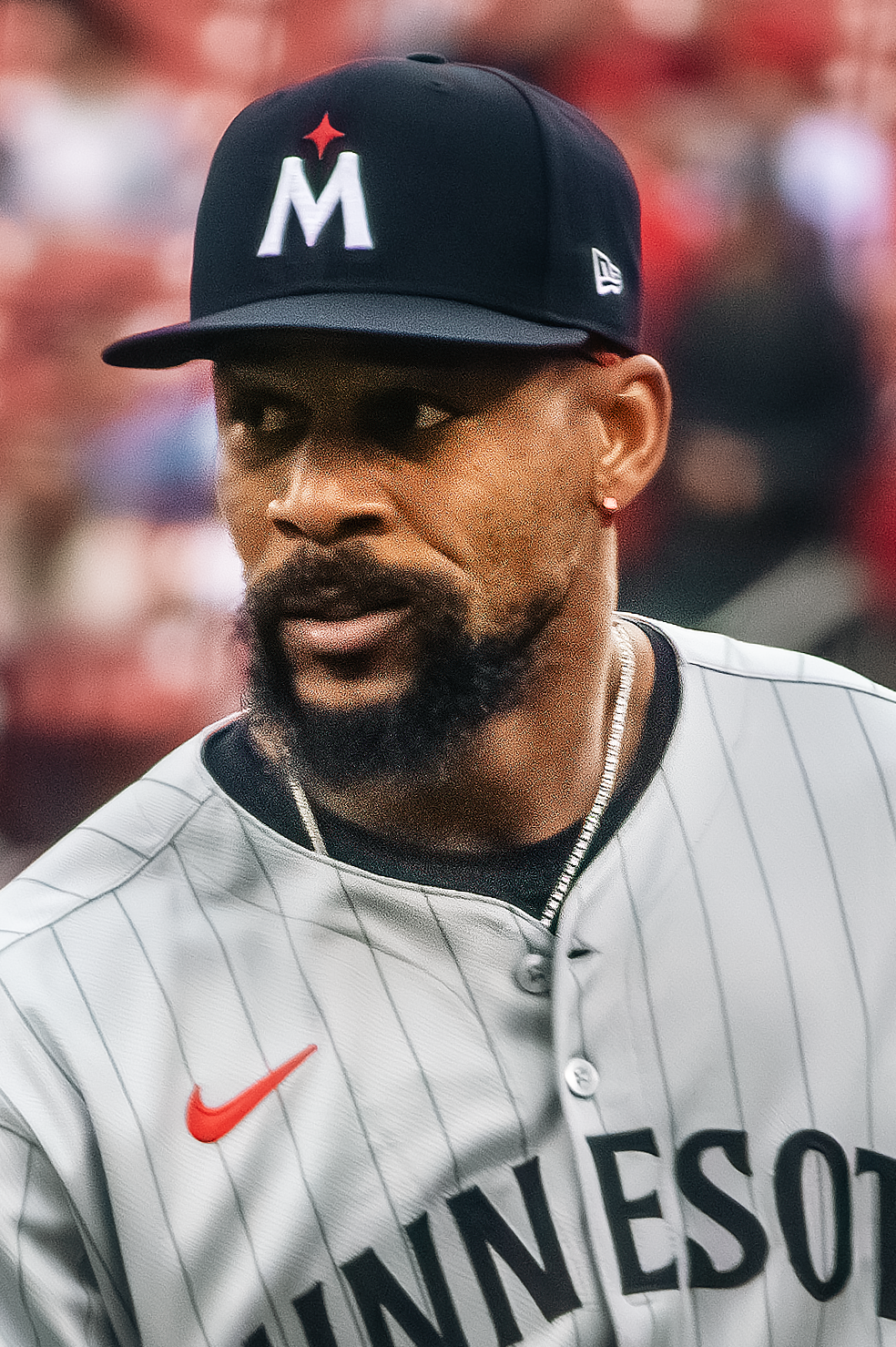
- Buxton with the Minnesota Twins in 2025.

Minnesota Twins – No. 25
- Center fielder / Designated hitter
- Born: December 18, 1993 (age 32); Baxley, Georgia, U.S.
- Bats: Right Throws: Right

MLB debut
- June 14, 2015, for the Minnesota Twins

MLB statistics (through 2026 season)
- Batting average: .248
- Home runs: 193
- Runs batted in: 482
- Stats at Baseball Reference

Teams
- Minnesota Twins (2015–present)

Career highlights and awards
- 3× All-Star (2022, 2025, 2026); Gold Glove Award (2017); Silver Slugger Award (2025)
Medals
Men's baseball
Representing United States
World Baseball Classic
Silver medal – second place	2026 Miami	Team

Byron Keiron Buxton (born December 18, 1993) is an American professional baseball center fielder and designated hitter for the Minnesota Twins of Major League Baseball (MLB). Buxton was considered by some baseball analysts to be the most talented player available in the 2012 MLB draft, and was selected as the second overall pick. He won Baseball America's Minor League Player of the Year Award in 2013. Buxton made his MLB debut in 2015. He won the Gold Glove Award in 2017, a Silver Slugger Award in 2025, and is a three-time MLB All-Star.

== Amateur career ==
Buxton started playing baseball when he was six years old. He attended Appling County High School in Baxley, Georgia, where he played for the school's baseball, basketball and football teams. In his high school days, Buxton was given the nickname "Buck". As a pitcher during his senior year, he had a 10–1 win–loss record with a 1.90 earned run average and 154 strikeouts in 81 innings pitched. Buxton also threw a fastball that was recorded at 99 miles per hour (159 km/h). His speed eventually led him to obtaining a well-above average speed rating of 70 as he left high school and readied for the draft.

Scouts noticed Buxton when he was 15 years old. He was recruited to play on a traveling summer team. He appeared in baseball showcases, including the East Coast Pro Showcase and Under Armour All-America Baseball Game. As a senior in high school, Buxton hit for a .513 batting average with 38 stolen bases in 39 games. Buxton committed to a college baseball scholarship with the University of Georgia, intending to attempt to walk on to the football team.

== Professional career ==
=== 2012–2014 ===
Considered a five-tool player, MLB.com rated Buxton the best prospect available in the 2012 Major League Baseball draft. The Minnesota Twins selected Buxton with the second overall pick in the 2012 draft. Buxton signed a contract with the Twins on June 12, 2012, that included a $6 million signing bonus. He made his professional debut in Minor League Baseball (MiLB) with the Gulf Coast League Twins of the Rookie-level Gulf Coast League (GCL), where he batted .216 in 26 games. Later in the year, he was promoted to the Elizabethton Twins of the Rookie-level Appalachian League, and batted .286 in 21 games. He was named the top prospect in the GCL.

Buxton started the 2013 season with the Cedar Rapids Kernels of the Single-A Midwest League. After he batted .340 with eight home runs and 32 stolen bases to start the season, the Twins promoted Buxton to the Fort Myers Miracle of the High-A Florida State League in June. By midseason, MLB.com, Keith Law of ESPN.com, and Baseball America viewed Buxton as the best prospect in baseball. He represented the Twins at the All-Star Futures Game. With Fort Myers, Buxton compiled a .326 average with four home runs, 22 RBI, and 23 stolen bases. After the season, Buxton was named the Midwest League Most Valuable Player. He also won both the Baseball America Minor League Player of the Year Award and the Topps Minor League Player of the Year Award.

The Twins invited Buxton to participate in spring training in 2014. He injured his left wrist, spraining his pisotriquetral joint, while diving for a ball and opened the 2014 season on the disabled list. Buxton was activated on May 4, and assigned to Fort Myers. After playing in five games with the Miracle, Buxton reinjured his wrist. Buxton batted .240 in 30 games before receiving a promotion to the New Britain Rock Cats of the Double-A Eastern League on August 11. In his first game with New Britain, on August 13, Buxton collided with fellow outfielder Mike Kvasnicka. Buxton was taken to the hospital and diagnosed with a concussion. The Twins shut Buxton down for the remainder of the regular season, but assigned him to the Arizona Fall League after the season.

=== 2015–2017 ===
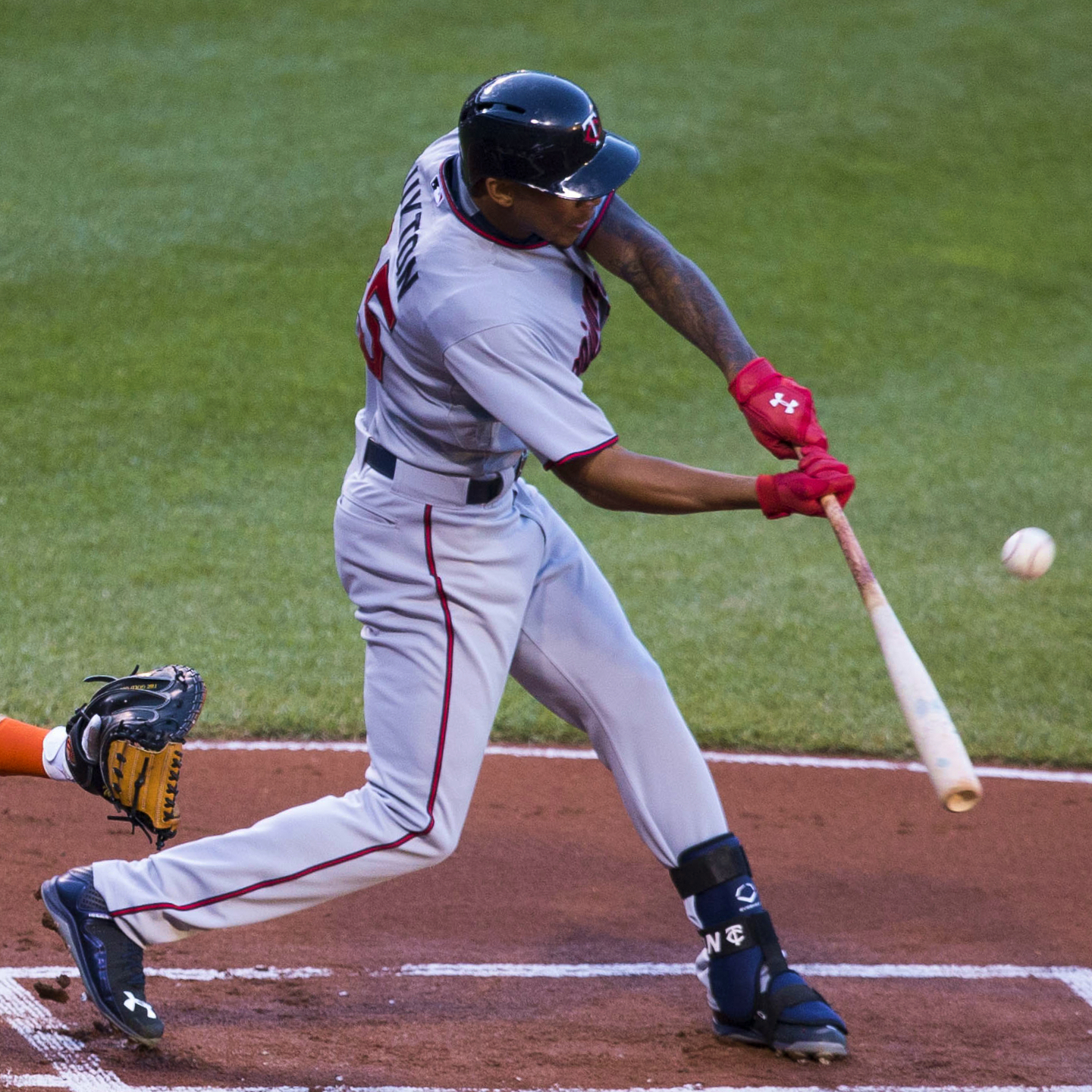
Buxton batting for the Minnesota Twins in 2015

Despite his having missed the majority of the 2014 season, MLB.com and Baseball Prospectus rated Buxton as the best prospect in baseball at the start of the 2015 season, and Baseball America named him the # 2 prospect in 2015. Buxton opened the 2015 season with the Twins' new Double-A affiliate, the Chattanooga Lookouts of the Southern League. The Twins promoted Buxton to make his major league debut on June 14. He scored the game-winning run in his debut. Buxton recorded his first hit, a triple, in his second game. After playing in ten games, Buxton sprained his thumb and went on the disabled list. The Twins activated Buxton from the disabled list on August 10 and optioned him to the Rochester Red Wings of the Triple-A International League, due to the strong play of Aaron Hicks. In the major leagues, in 2015 while striking out 44 times in 129 at bats he hit .209/.250/.326 and stole two bases in four attempts.

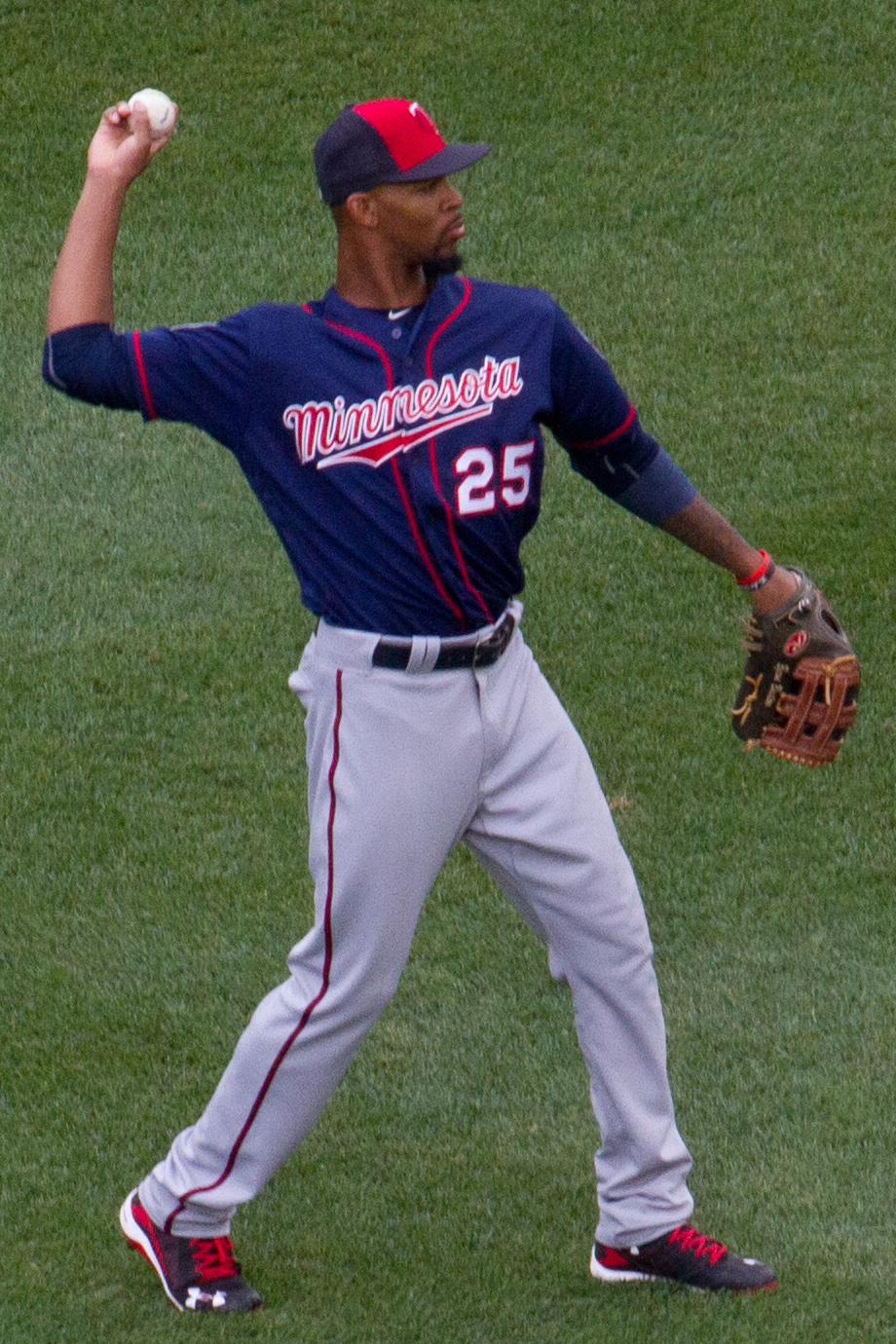
Byron Buxton during a game against the Washington Nationals 2016.

Buxton began the 2016 season as the Twins' starting center fielder. However, he batted .156 in 17 games, while striking out in 53% of his at bats, and was optioned to Rochester on April 25. He was called up again during mid season and remained at center field. He finished batting .225/.284/.430 with 10 home runs and 10 stolen bases in 12 attempts while striking out 118 times in 298 at bats. According to Statcast, Buxton led MLB in average sprint speed at 30.8 feet per second, after tying with Jarrod Dyson for the lead in the previous season.

Buxton was once again the Twins opening day center fielder to begin the 2017 season. He was batting just .219 at the start of August. On August 18, he was safe at home on the fastest inside-the-park home run ever recorded by Statcast, circling the bases in 13.85 seconds. On August 27, Buxton hit three home runs against the Toronto Blue Jays. He hit .324 in August with eight home runs and eight stolen bases. For the season, he batted .253/.314/.413 with 29 stolen bases in 30 attempts, while striking out 150 times in 462 at bats. He won a Wilson Defensive Player of the Year Award for all major league fielders, as well as for center field, given to the top defensive player in the major leagues at each position. He also won a Fielding Bible Award, a Rawlings Gold Glove Award, and the Platinum Glove Award for the American League. He again led MLB in sprint speed, at 30.5 feet per second.

=== 2018–present ===
Buxton's 2018 season got off to a sloppy start, as he spent some stints on the disabled list due to a toe injury and migraines. On July 2, he was activated from the disabled list, but also optioned to Triple-A Rochester. In the majors, he batted .156/.183/.200 while striking out 28 times in 90 at bats, and stole five bases without being caught. The Twins opted not to promote Buxton to the major leagues during September call-ups, a decision that Buxton said, "didn't go over well." He yet again led MLB in sprint speed, again at 30.5 feet per second.

On April 22, 2019, Buxton's streak of 33 stolen bases was ended after he was caught stealing by Robinson Chirinos of the Houston Astros. In 2019, Buxton batted .262 and had the fastest sprint speed of all American League players, at 30.3 feet/second.

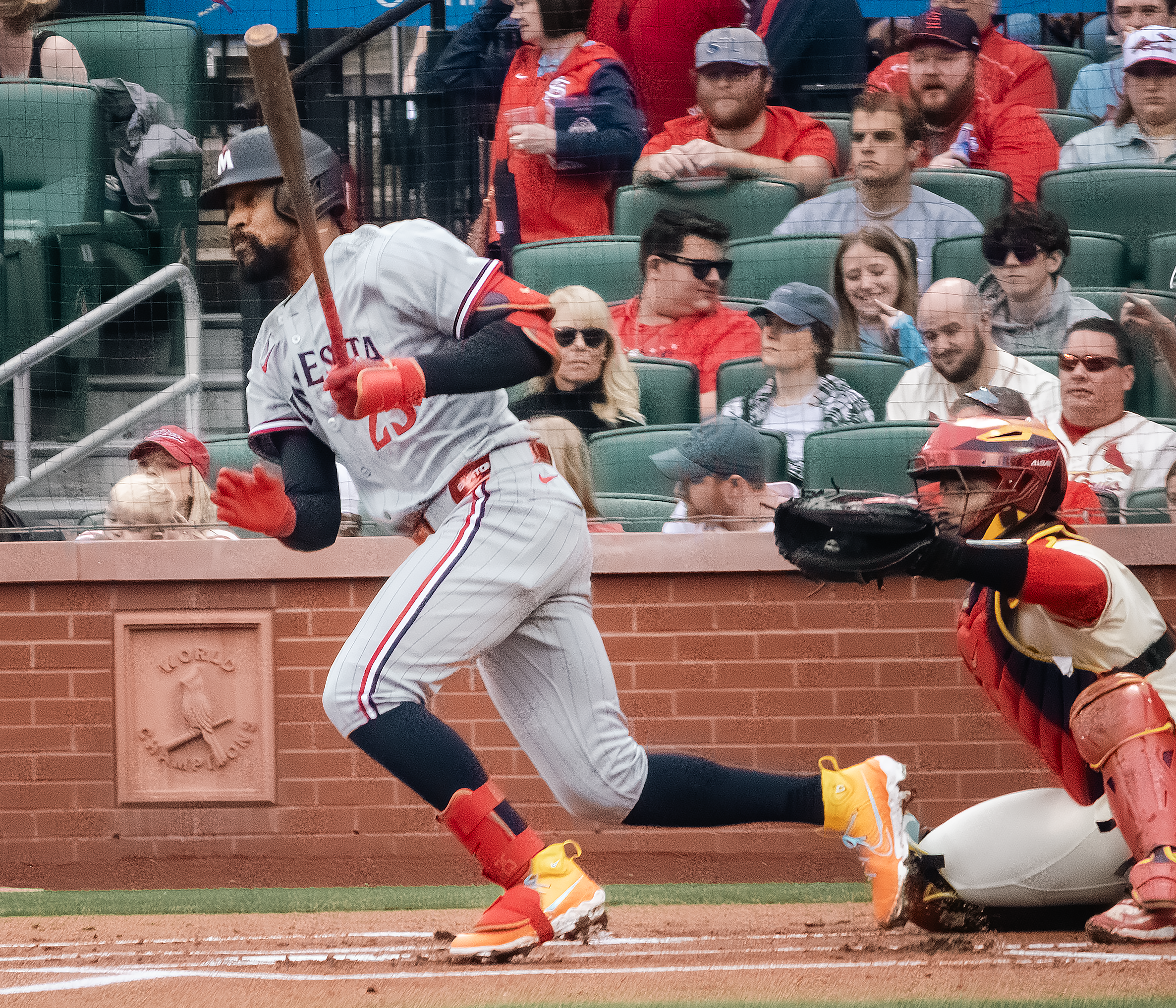
Buxton in St.Louis, 2025.

In the abbreviated 2020 Major League Baseball season, Buxton played 39 of Minnesota's 60 games, primarily missing time due to a shoulder injury sustained in late August. Buxton batted .254 with a .267 on base percentage and a career-high .577 slugging percentage in 39 games.

Buxton was named the American League Player of the Month for April 2021, when he hit .426 with eight home runs and 14 RBI.

On December 1, 2021, Buxton signed a seven-year, $100 million contract extension with the Twins. When Carlos Correa joined the Twins for the 2022 season, he and Buxton became the third pair of players picked first and second in the same draft to then play for one club. On June 9, 2022, the trio of Luis Arráez, Buxton, and Correa each hit consecutive home runs off Gerrit Cole to open the bottom of the first inning against the New York Yankees. Buxton then hit a three-run home run in the second inning. In June 2022, Buxton hit his 44th home run since he had last grounded into a double play, which occurred on September 7, 2020, surpassing a record of 43 held by Matt Carpenter. On July 5, 2022, Buxton started the first 8–5 triple play in major league history when he caught an A. J. Pollock fly ball at the wall in the bottom of the seventh inning versus the Chicago White Sox. Buxton threw to third baseman Gio Urshela, who tagged a retreating Yoán Moncada out at second base and stepped on the bag to retire Adam Engel. In 2022 he slashed .224/.306/.526 in 92 games, 35 of them at DH.

During the 2023 spring training, Buxton was moved to being the Twins' primary DH to keep him in the lineup for the full season. In 2023, he slashed .207/.294/.438 in 85 games, without playing any games in the field.

In 2024, he was moved back to center field. In 2024, he slashed .279/.335/.524 in 105 games.

On May 1, 2025, Buxton stole his 100th career stolen base against the Cleveland Guardians. With that stolen base, he became the eighth player in Twins history to reach the milestone. More notably, Buxton became the third player since the franchise moved to the Twin Cities to reach both 100 steals and 100 homers, joining Kirby Puckett and Torii Hunter. On June 19, Buxton hit two home runs in 12–5 victory against the Cincinnati Reds. His first-inning long ball was the 12th leadoff homer of his career, tied for the fifth most in Twins history. On July 12, Buxton hit for the cycle in a 12–4 victory against the Pittsburgh Pirates on his bobblehead day. He became the 350th player to hit for the cycle in major-league history, the 12th player in Twins history (since 1961) to hit for the cycle, and the first player to do so at Target Field, which opened in 2010. The last Twin to hit for the cycle was Jorge Polanco on April 5, 2019, against the Philadelphia Phillies. The last Minnesota player to accomplish the feat at home was Michael Cuddyer, on May 22, 2009, at the Metrodome. On August 29, Buxton stole a base which gave him his first 20/20 season. In 2025, he slashed .264/.327/.551 in 126 games.

On April 13, 2026, Buxton hit a solo home run against the Boston Red Sox, making him the all-time leader in home runs at Target Field with 85 homers, passing Max Kepler. He made 93 appearances for Minnesota during the regular season, slashing .254/.319/.511 with 25 home runs and 46 RBI. On September 11, it was announced that Buxton would undergo season–ending surgery on his right hip.

== Personal life ==
Buxton is from Baxley, Georgia, where he spent his adolescent years through high school. His father, Felton, owns a trucking company, and his mother, Carrie, works in a school cafeteria. Byron is one of their three children, one of whom, daughter Keva, is ten years Byron's junior. Buxton's cousin, Dexter Carter, is a former NFL running back.

Buxton began dating Lindsey Tillery in 2012. She also attended Appling County High School, where she played softball, and was three years ahead of Buxton. They married in 2016, and have three sons together: Their oldest was born in 2013, their second in 2020, and third in 2023.

Buxton co-owns an Ellianos Coffee franchise in Baxley, Georgia, alongside his family. Introduced to the brand in 2019, Buxton saw an opportunity to open a store during the COVID-19 pandemic. Passionate about coffee, he arranges for Ellianos to be shipped to Minnesota and is hands-on in the business, even assisting behind the scenes. The family is expanding with plans to open a second location in Jesup, Georgia. Buxton views the venture as a way to secure his family’s future and create a lasting legacy beyond baseball.

Achievements
Preceded by Carson Kelly	Hitting for the cycle July 12, 2025	Succeeded by Pete Crow-Armstrong
