= Bank of Surrency =

Historic bank in Georgia, US

- U.S. National Register of Historic Places
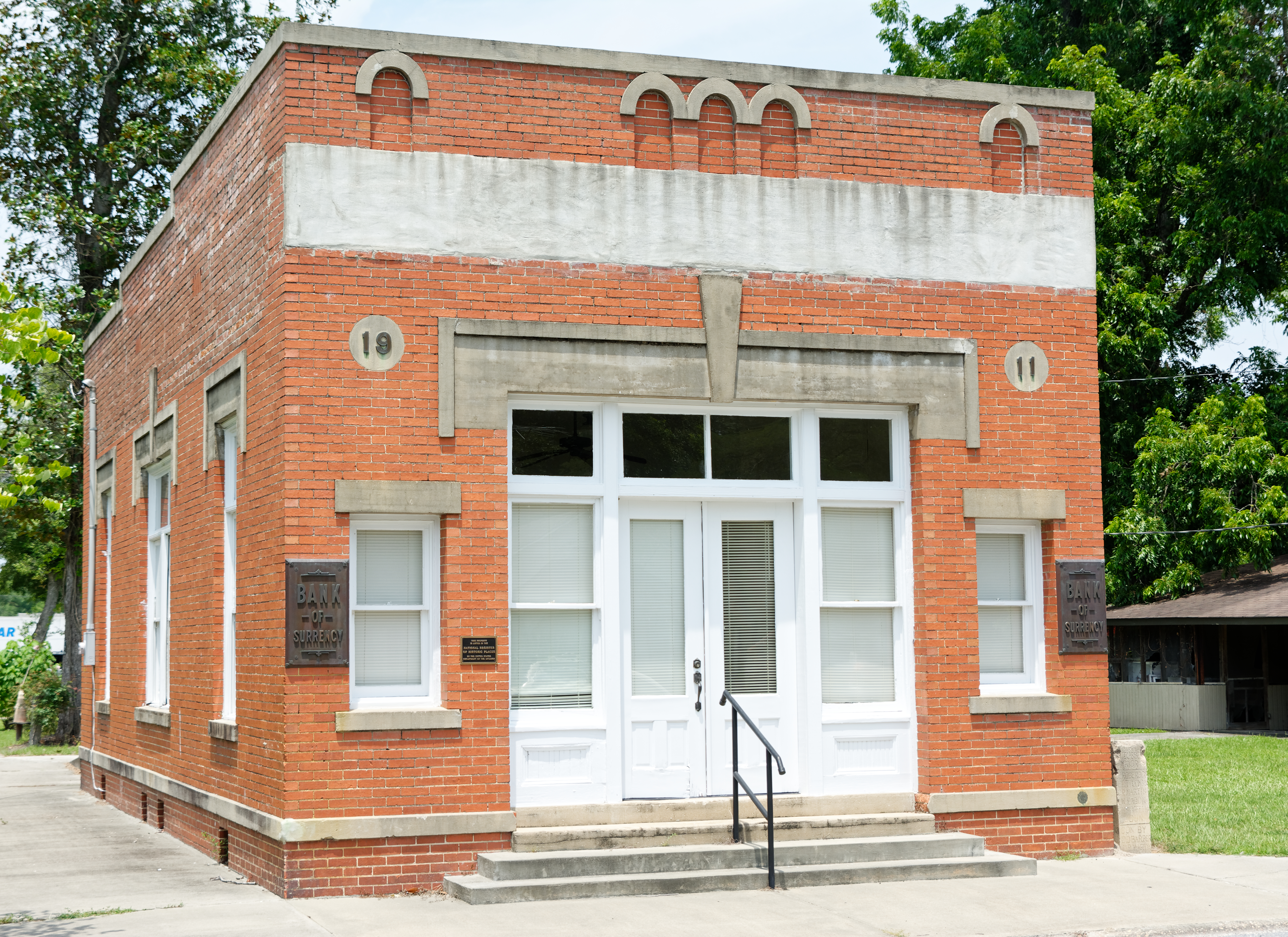

- Location within Georgia Location within the United States
- Location: 80 Hart St., Surrency, Georgia
- Coordinates: 31°43′27″N 82°11′55″W
- Area: 0.1 acres (0.040 ha)
- Built: 1911
- Architectural style: Early Commercial
- NRHP reference No.: 02001742
- Added to NRHP: January 31, 2003

The Bank of Surrency, at 80 Hart St. in Surrency, Georgia, was built in 1911. It is a small Early Commercial-style building and has also been known as Surrency Post Office. It was listed on the National Register of Historic Places in 2003. The bank served as Surrency's post office from 1926 to 1960. It was later used for sweet potato storage. It was bought in 1999 by the City of Surrency with plans to develop it as a local museum and visitor's welcome center. The building was in use as the Surrency city hall in 2007.
