= Jamie Nails =

American football player (born 1977)

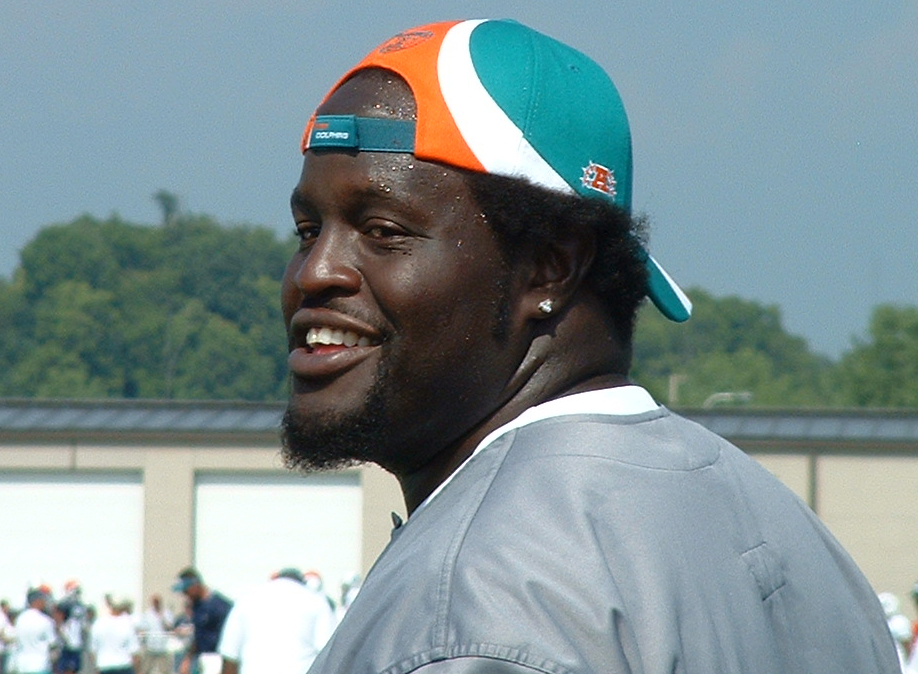
- Nails with the Miami Dolphins in 2003

No. 66, 74
- Position: Guard

Personal information
- Born: June 3, 1977 (age 49); Baxley, Georgia, U.S.
- Listed height: 6 ft 6 in (1.98 m)
- Listed weight: 335 lb (152 kg)

Career information
- High school: Appling County (Baxley)
- College: Florida A&M
- NFL draft: 1997: 4th round, 120th overall pick

Career history
- Buffalo Bills (1997–2000); Miami Dolphins (2002–2003)

Awards and highlights
- MEAC Offensive Linemen of the Year (1996); First-team All-MEAC (1996); Div. I-AA All-American (1996)

Career NFL statistics
- Games played: 78
- Games started: 51
- Fumble recoveries: 2
- Stats at Pro Football Reference

Jamie Marcellus Nails (born June 3, 1977) is an American former professional football player who was a guard in the National Football League (NFL). He was selected by the Buffalo Bills in the fourth round of the 1997 NFL draft. He played college football for the Florida A&M Rattlers. Nails is now an athletic coach for youth athletes in Georgia.

Nails also played for the Miami Dolphins.
