= Frankie King =

American basketball player (born 1972)

Personal information
- Born: June 6, 1972 (age 54) Baxley, Georgia, U.S.
- Listed height: 6 ft 1 in (1.85 m)
- Listed weight: 185 lb (84 kg)

Career information
- High school: Appling County (Baxley, Georgia)
- College: College of Coastal Georgia (1991–1993); Western Carolina (1993–1995)
- NBA draft: 1995: 2nd round, 37th overall pick
- Drafted by: Los Angeles Lakers
- Playing career: 1995–2007
- Position: Point guard / shooting guard
- Number: 4, 20, 11

Career history
- 1995: Memphis Fire
- 1995–1996: Los Angeles Lakers
- 1996–1997: Covirán Granada
- 1997: Philadelphia 76ers
- 1997–1998: Panionios Athens
- 1998–1999: PAOK Thessaloniki
- 1999: Alba Berlin
- 2000–2001: Paris Racing
- 2001–2002: Aris Thessaloniki
- 2002–2003: BCM Gravelines
- 2003–2004: Gary Steelheads
- 2004: Galatasaray
- 2004: Toros de Aragua
- 2004–2006: Proteas EKA AEL
- 2006: Ironi Ramat Gan
- 2006–2007: APOEL

Career highlights
- FIBA EuroCup All-Star (2006); Greek Cup winner (1999); Greek League assists leader (1999); 2× Greek League All-Star (1997, 1998); Greek Cup Finals Top Scorer (1999); 2× Cypriot League champion (2005, 2006); Cypriot Super Cup winner (2005); 2× SoCon Player of the Year (1994, 1995); 2× SoCon Top Scorer (1994, 1995); 2× First-team All-SoCon (1994, 1995)
- Stats at NBA.com
- Stats at Basketball Reference

Frankie Alexander King (born June 6, 1972) is an American former professional basketball player. During his pro club career, at a height of 6 ft 1 (1.85 m) tall, and a weight of 185 lbs. (84 kg), he played at the point guard and shooting guard positions. King played in the NBA, with the Los Angeles Lakers and Philadelphia 76ers.

== College career ==
King attended Appling County High, in Baxley, Georgia, where he played high school basketball. After high school, King played college basketball at the former Brunswick College, which is now known as the College of Coastal Georgia, from 1991 to 1993. He then played college basketball at Western Carolina University, with the Western Carolina Catamounts, from 1993 to 1995.

King was inducted into the Western Carolina Athletics Hall of Fame in 2013. In 2021, he was named to the Southern Conference's men's basketball 100th anniversary team.

== Professional career ==
In the 1995 NBA draft, King was selected in the second round, with the 37th overall draft pick, by the Los Angeles Lakers. He played with the Lakers, in the 1995–96 season, and with the Philadelphia 76ers, in the 1996–97 season. King's NBA career consisted of a total of thirteen games played, six with the Lakers and seven with the 76ers.

After playing in the NBA, King also played professionally in numerous European countries: Spain, Greece, Germany, France, Turkey, and Cyprus. He also professionally played in Asia (Israel), and in South America (Venezuela).
