= Dexter Carter =

American football player and coach (born 1967)

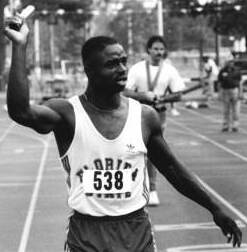
- Carter running track at Florida State in 1988

No. 35
- Position: Running back

Personal information
- Born: September 15, 1967 (age 59); Baxley, Georgia, U.S.
- Listed height: 5 ft 9 in (1.75 m)
- Listed weight: 170 lb (77 kg)

Career information
- High school: Appling County (Baxley)
- College: Florida State
- NFL draft: 1990: 1st round, 25th overall pick

Career history

Playing
- San Francisco 49ers (1990–1994); New York Jets (1995); San Francisco 49ers (1995–1996)

Coaching
- Florida State (2007–2010)

Awards and highlights
- Super Bowl champion (XXIX)

Career NFL statistics
- Rushing yards: 1,042
- Rushing average: 4.2
- Rushing touchdowns: 5
- Receptions: 61
- Receiving yards: 656
- Receiving touchdowns: 2
- Stats at Pro Football Reference

Dexter Anthony Carter (born September 15, 1967) is an American former professional football player who was a running back for the San Francisco 49ers and New York Jets of the National Football League (NFL). He played college football for the Florida State Seminoles and was selected in the first round of the 1990 NFL draft.

== NFL career ==
In 1990, Carter was drafted in the first round by the 49ers, the winner of the previous two Super Bowls, with the hopes of taking some of the running game responsibility from Roger Craig as well as serving as the primary kick returner. He led the team in rushing in his rookie season with 460 yards after Craig missed 5 games due to injury. He was the second-leading rusher in 1991 behind Keith Henderson, but then fell on the running back depth chart the following year and became almost exclusively a kick returner after that. He was a contributor in this capacity to the 49ers' Super Bowl XXIX team in 1994. In 1996, he was selected as a member of the 50th Anniversary 49er Modern Era All-Time Team.

In that after Super Bowl XXIX, he signed a free agent three-year contract with the Jets. He struggled on his new team, fumbling 7 times (losing 4) in 10 games before being cut on November 8. He was then picked up by the 49ers and resumed his role as their kick and punt returner the next week. He created NFL history that season by becoming the only player ever to record at least one touch and one all purpose yard in 17 regular season games. He did this by playing for the Jets before their bye week and being signed by the 49ers after their bye week.

Carter finished his 7 NFL seasons with 1,042 rushing yards and 5 touchdowns, along with 59 receptions for 652 yards and 2 touchdowns. On special teams, he returned 138 punts for 1,358 yards and 2 touchdowns, while also returning 250 kickoffs for 5,412 yards and 2 touchdowns.

== Coaching career ==
In 2007, Dexter returned to Florida State University as the running backs coach for 3 seasons. He was not retained after the 2009 season as incoming head coach Jimbo Fisher brought in his own coaches when taking over for Bobby Bowden.

== Personal life ==
Carter's cousin, Byron Buxton, is a professional baseball player. He was the second overall pick in the MLB draft. Both hail from Baxley Georgia. His son, Dexter Carter Jr., has drawn comparisons to his father with his speed and natural football ability at the Bolles School in Jacksonville, Florida. Dexter is the Founder and Chairman for Dexter Carter 35 Foundation. The mission is Making Hopes and Dreams a Reality for at risk youth experiencing despair, hardship and poverty.
