= Little Satilla Creek =

Coordinates: 31.45474°N 82.05275°W

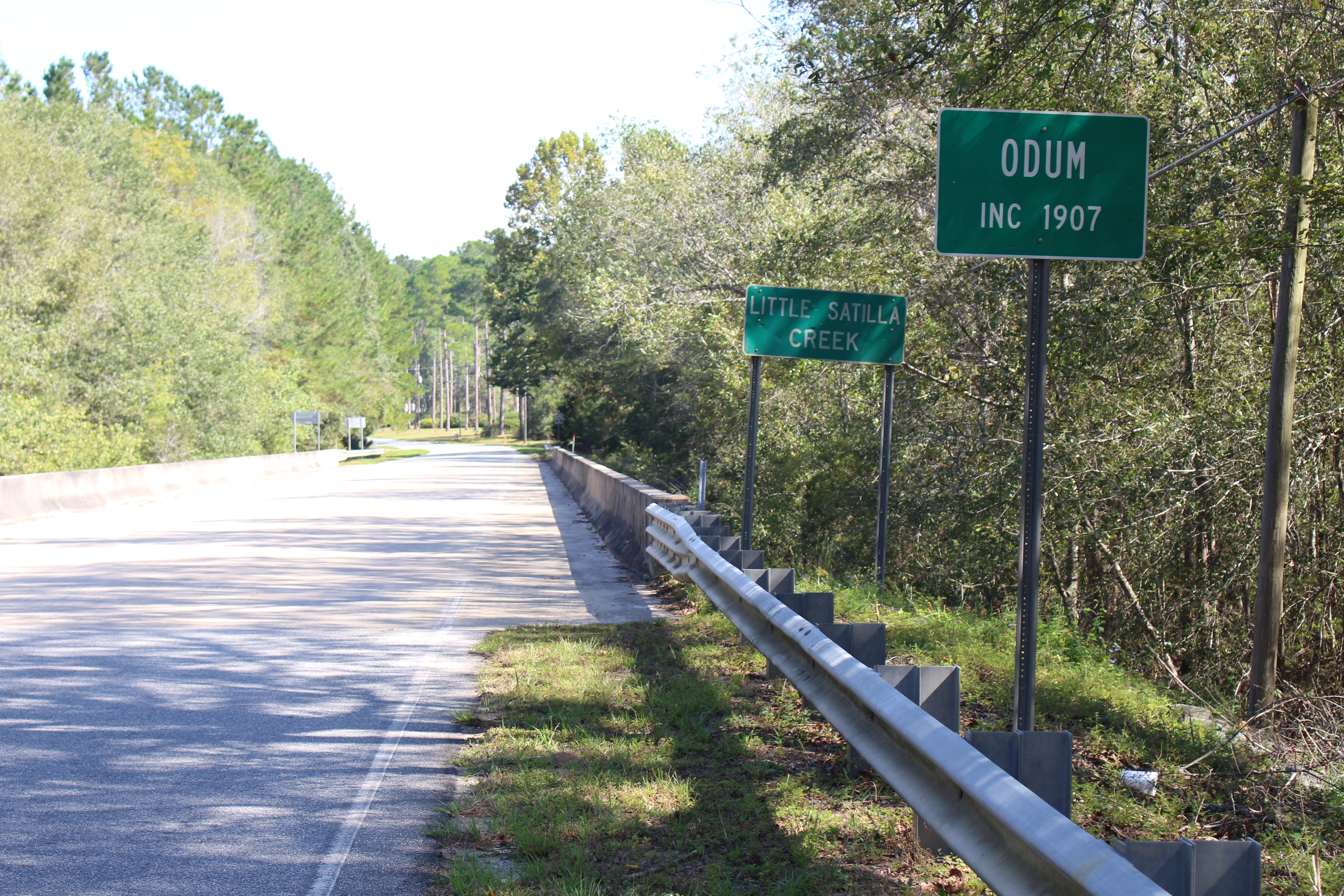
- Little Satilla Creek crossing on South Church Street at Odum city limits.

Location
- Country: United States

Physical characteristics
- Source
  - location: Georgia

The Little Satilla Creek is a 39.3-mile-long (63.2 km) tributary of the Little Satilla River in the U.S. state of Georgia. It is part of the Satilla River watershed in southeastern Georgia.

The creek rises in Appling County northwest of Surrency and flows southeast into Wayne County, to a point 5 miles (8 km) west of Jesup, where it turns to the southwest and continues to its junction with Big Satilla Creek southwest of Screven, where the two creeks form the Little Satilla River.

== See also ==
- List of rivers of Georgia

== Bibliography ==
- U.S. Geological Survey Geographic Names Information System: Little Satilla Creek
- USGS Hydrologic Unit Map - State of Georgia (1974)
