= Holmesville, Georgia =

Unincorporated community in Georgia, U.S.

Coordinates: 31°42′14″N 82°19′14″W

Holmesville is an unincorporated community in Appling County, in the U.S. state of Georgia.

== History ==
A post office called Holmesville was established in 1831, and remained in operation until 1889. Appling County's county seat was located at Holmesville from 1828 until 1874, when it was transferred to Baxley.

The Georgia General Assembly incorporated the place as the Town of Holmesville in 1854. The town's municipal charter was repealed in 1995.
