= Graham, Georgia =

- City
- Location in Appling County and the state of Georgia
- Coordinates: 31°49′59″N 82°30′13″W
- Country: United States
- State: Georgia
- County: Appling

Area
  - Total: 1.75 sq mi (4.53 km^{2})
  - Land: 1.74 sq mi (4.51 km^{2})
  - Water: 0.0077 sq mi (0.02 km^{2})
- Elevation: 240 ft (73 m)

Population (2020)
  - Total: 263
  - Density: 151.1/sq mi (58.35/km^{2})
- Time zone: UTC-5 (Eastern (EST))
  - Summer (DST): UTC-4 (EDT)
- ZIP code: 31513
- Area code: 912
- FIPS code: 13-34260
- GNIS feature ID: 0331846
- Website: cityofgrahamga.com

Graham is a city in Appling County, Georgia, United States. The population was 263 in 2020.

== History ==
The community was named after J. H. Graham, an early settler.

The city of Graham was incorporated locally in 1897. Graham was officially granted a charter by the state legislature in 1991.

== Geography ==
Graham is located at 31°49′59″N 82°30′13″W (31.832940, -82.503631).

According to the United States Census Bureau, the city has a total area of 1.7 square miles (4.5 km^{2}), all land.

== Demographics ==
Historical population
Census	Pop.	Note	%±
1910	193		—
2000	312		—
2010	291		−6.7%
2020	263		−9.6%
U.S. Decennial Census

As of the census of 2000, there were 312 people, 120 households, and 90 families residing in the city. By 2020's census, its population declined to 263.
