= Little Satilla River (Atlantic Ocean) =

River in Georgia, US

- Location of mouth

Location
- Country: United States
- State: Georgia
- Counties: Glynn, Camden

Physical characteristics
- Source
  - location: near Waverly
  - coordinates: 31°07′49″N 81°41′06″W
- Mouth
  - location: Atlantic Ocean
  - coordinates: 31°02′12″N 81°27′07″W

The Little Satilla River (formerly the St. Illa River) is a 22.6-mile-long (36.4 km) tidal river that forms the boundary between Glynn and Camden counties in the U.S. state of Georgia. It is a separate river from the Little Satilla River, 20 miles (32 km) to the northwest, which is a freshwater tributary of the Satilla River.

The Rural Felicity Plantation formerly stood near the southern banks of the river.

== See also ==
- List of rivers of Georgia
