= Baxley, Georgia =

- City
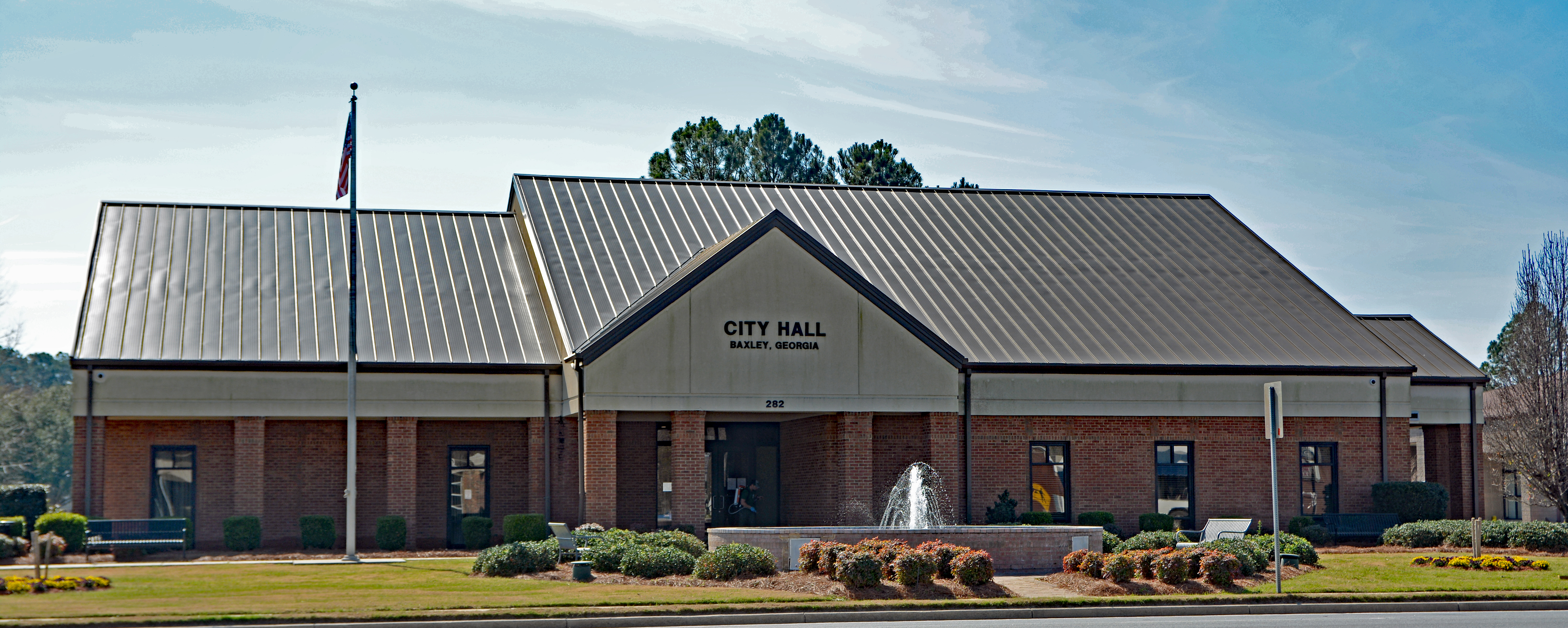
- City hall in Baxley

- Logo

- Location in Appling County and the state of Georgia
- Coordinates: 31°46′31″N 82°20′51″W
- Country: United States
- State: Georgia
- County: Appling

Area
  - Total: 8.11 sq mi (21.01 km^{2})
  - Land: 8.10 sq mi (20.99 km^{2})
  - Water: 0.0077 sq mi (0.02 km^{2})
- Elevation: 203 ft (62 m)

Population (2020)
  - Total: 4,942
  - Density: 610/sq mi (235.4/km^{2})
- Time zone: UTC-5 (Eastern (EST))
  - Summer (DST): UTC-4 (EDT)
- ZIP codes: 31513, 31515
- Area code: 912
- FIPS code: 13-06016
- GNIS feature ID: 0331106
- Website: baxley.org

Baxley is a city in Appling County, Georgia, United States. As of the 2020 census, the city had a population of 4,942. The city is the county seat of Appling County.

== History ==
Baxley was first settled as a result of the Macon and Brunswick Railroad being built through Appling County in 1870. Originally, it was a railroad depot known as Station No. 7, but soon was named Baxley (after one of the community's first settlers, Wilson Baxley of North Carolina). Baxley incorporated in 1875.

== Geography ==
Baxley is approximately 42 miles (68 km) east of Douglas, 47 miles (76 km) north of Waycross and 29 miles (47 km) southwest of Glennville.

According to the United States Census Bureau, the city has a total area of 8.4 square miles (21.7 km^{2}), of which 0.012 square miles (0.03 km^{2}), or 0.16%, is water.

== Demographics ==
Historical population
Census	Pop.	Note	%±
1880	110		—
1890	337		206.4%
1900	488		44.8%
1910	831		70.3%
1920	1,142		37.4%
1930	2,122		85.8%
1940	2,916		37.4%
1950	3,409		16.9%
1960	4,268		25.2%
1970	3,503		−17.9%
1980	3,586		2.4%
1990	3,841		7.1%
2000	4,150		8.0%
2010	4,400		6.0%
2020	4,942		12.3%
U.S. Decennial Census

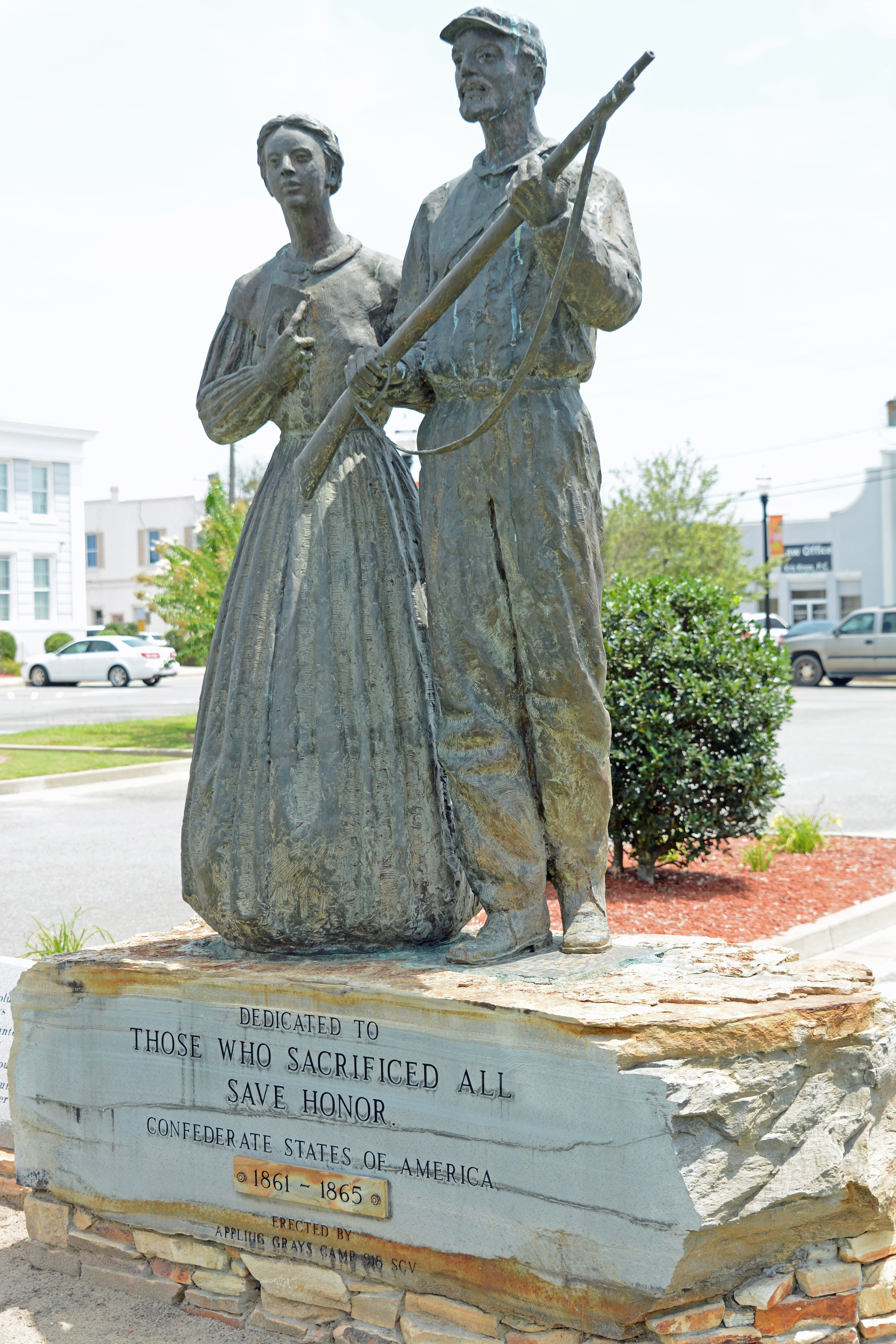
Confederate memorial

=== 2020 census ===
As of the 2020 census, Baxley had a population of 4,942. There were 1,068 families residing in the city. The median age was 36.5 years. About 25.9% of residents were under the age of 18 and 16.3% were 65 years of age or older. For every 100 females there were 93.3 males, and for every 100 females age 18 and over there were 91.5 males age 18 and over.

About 88.4% of residents lived in urban areas, while 11.6% lived in rural areas.

There were 1,895 households in Baxley, of which 32.1% had children under the age of 18 living in them. Of all households, 36.2% were married-couple households, 20.0% were households with a male householder and no spouse or partner present, and 38.7% were households with a female householder and no spouse or partner present. About 31.6% of all households were made up of individuals and 13.1% had someone living alone who was 65 years of age or older.

There were 2,284 housing units, of which 17.0% were vacant. The homeowner vacancy rate was 2.4% and the rental vacancy rate was 8.9%.

Baxley racial composition as of 2020
Race	Num.	Perc.
White (non-Hispanic)	2,338	47.31%
Black or African American (non-Hispanic)	1,696	34.32%
Native American	3	0.06%
Asian	89	1.8%
Other/Mixed	154	3.12%
Hispanic or Latino	662	13.4%

== Economy ==
The Edwin I. Hatch Nuclear Power Plant is located north of the city along U.S. Route 1, on the banks of the Altamaha River. It is the area's largest employer.

International Forest Products Limited operates a sawmill employing over 50 people.

== Education ==
Appling County K-12 students are in the Appling County School District, which consists of four elementary schools (three include a preschool), a middle school and a high school. The district has 210 full-time teachers and over 3,303 students.

- Altamaha Elementary School
- Appling County Primary School
- Appling County Elementary School
- Fourth District Elementary School
- Appling County Middle School
- Appling County High School

== Notable people ==
- Robert Butler, painter best known for his portrayals of the woods and backwaters around Florida's Everglades; member of the African-American artists' group The Highwaymen
- Byron Buxton, Major League Baseball outfielder; second overall pick (drafted by the Minnesota Twins) in the 2012 MLB draft; 2022 and 2025 MLB All Star
- Dexter Carter, running back for San Francisco 49ers and New York Jets from 1990 to 1996; born in Baxley and graduated from Appling County High School
- Frankie King, NBA guard for Los Angeles Lakers (1995); born in Baxley
- The Lacs, country/rap music group; from Baxley
- Caroline Miller, Georgia's first Pulitzer Prize-winning novelist; received the award for Lamb in His Bosom in 1934
- Jamie Nails, NFL guard for Buffalo Bills (1997–2000) and Miami Dolphins (2002–2003); born in Baxley
- Janisse Ray, author of Ecology of a Cracker Childhood (1999), a memoir about growing up in Baxley which includes description of the ecosystem of the vanishing longleaf pine that once covered the area
- Carl Simpson, defensive tackle for Chicago Bears (1993–1997), Arizona Cardinals (1998–1999), and Las Vegas Outlaws (2001)
- Harry Skipper, defensive back in the CFL, Montreal Concordes and Saskatchewan Roughriders, 1983–1989
- Vonzell Solomon, nicknamed Baby V, singer and actress
- Michael Timpson, wide receiver for New England Patriots (1989–1994), Chicago Bears (1995–1996), and Philadelphia Eagles (1997); born in Baxley
