= Little Satilla River (Satilla River tributary) =

Coordinates: 31.29837°N 81.89706°W

Location
- Country: United States

Physical characteristics
- Source
  - location: Georgia

The Little Satilla River is a 28.4-mile-long (45.7 km) freshwater tributary of the Satilla River in the U.S. state of Georgia. It should not be confused with the tidal Little Satilla River that is 20 miles (32 km) to the southeast and is an inlet of the Atlantic Ocean.

The freshwater Little Satilla River forms at the juncture of Big Satilla Creek and Little Satilla Creek, close to the U.S. Route 84 crossing of the two creeks southwest of Screven. The river flows south as the boundary between Wayne and Pierce counties, then turns more southeast as it becomes the boundary between Pierce and Brantley counties. Turning fully to the east, it enters Brantley County, is crossed by U.S. Route 301, and joins the Satilla River 4 miles (6 km) southeast of Hortense.

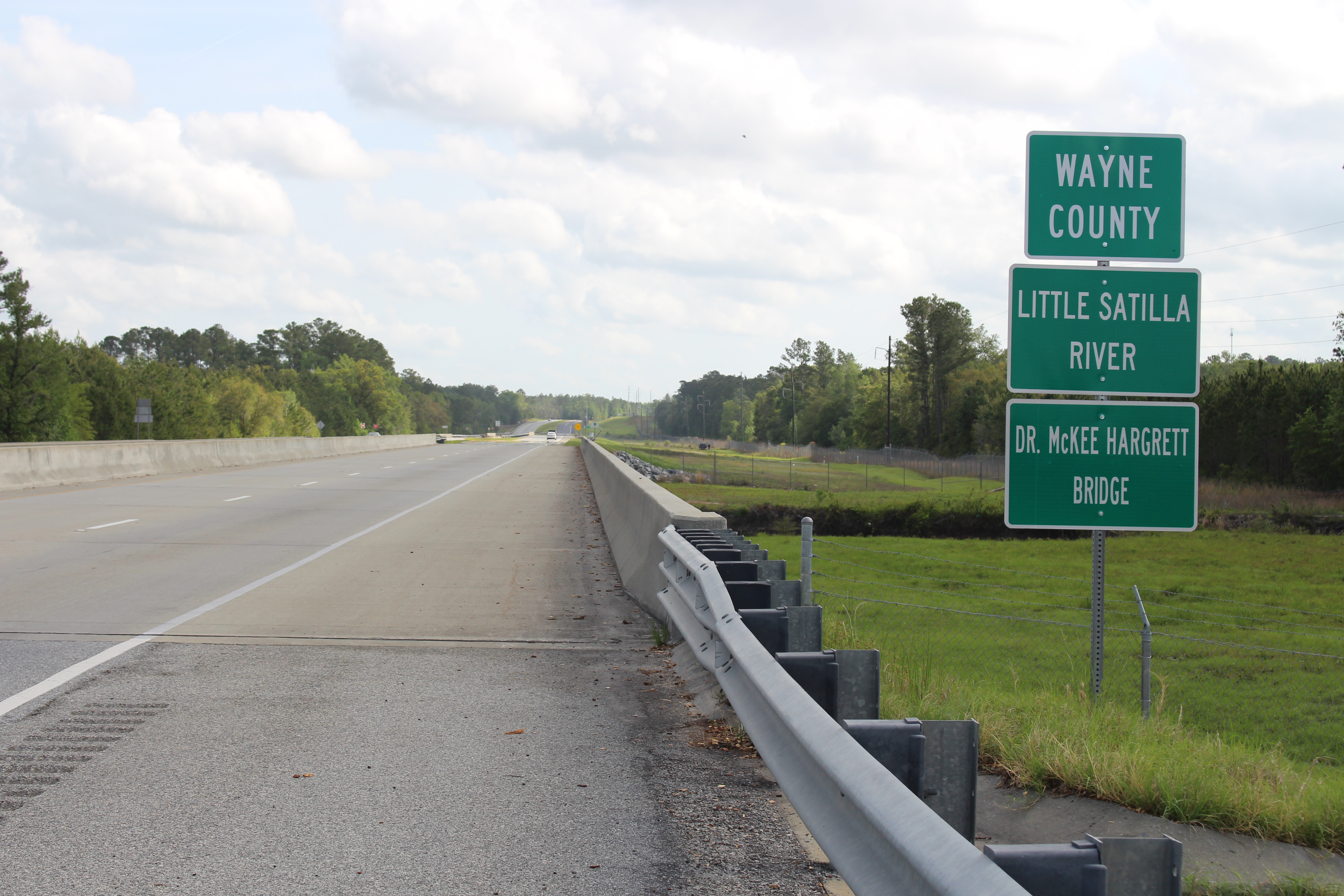
Little Satilla River is the boundary between Wayne and Pierce counties.

== See also ==
- List of rivers of Georgia
