= Appling County, Georgia =

County in Georgia, United States

- County
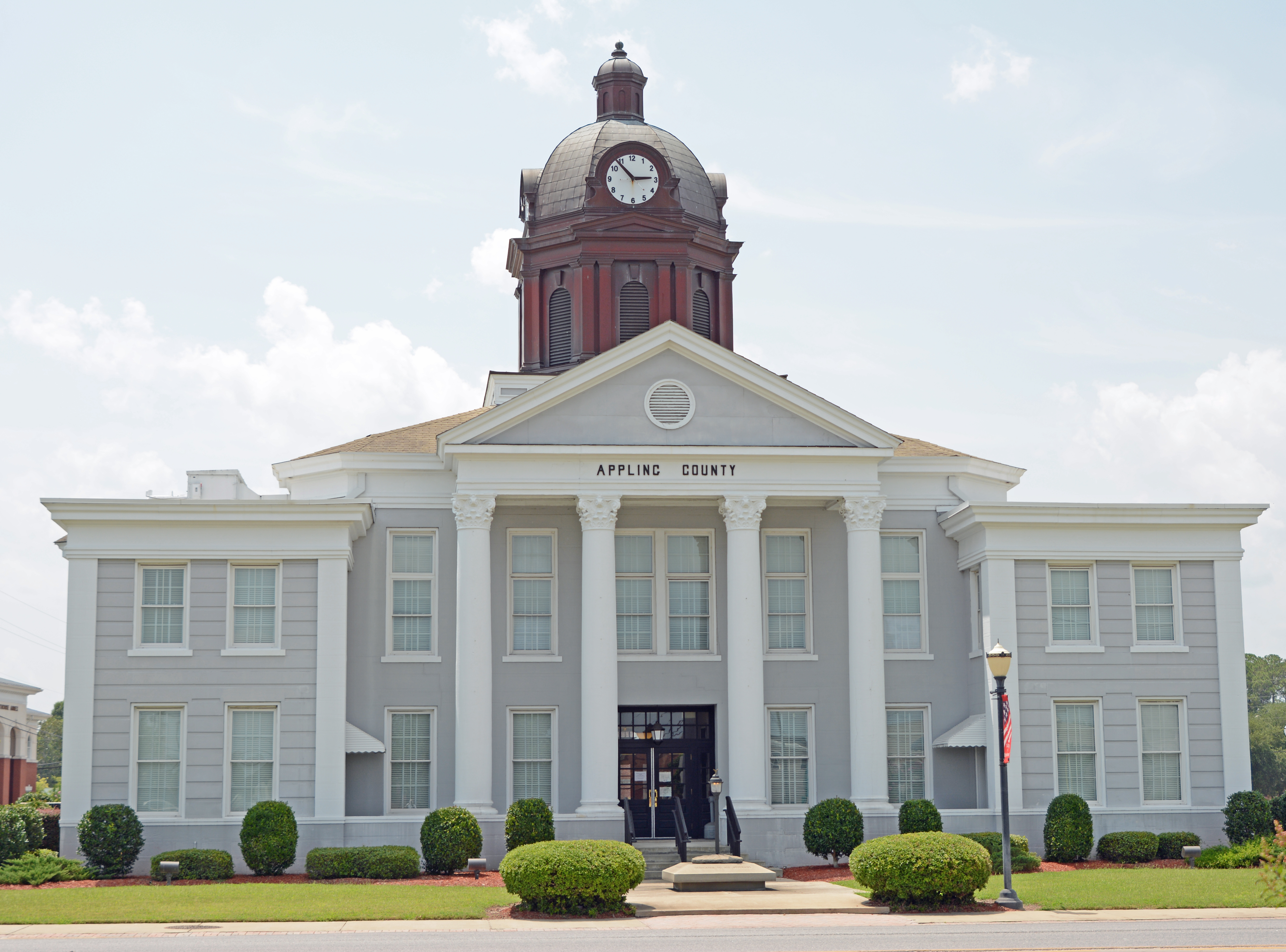
- Appling County Courthouse in Baxley

- Location within the U.S. state of Georgia
- Coordinates: 31°45′N 82°17′W
- Country: United States
- State: Georgia
- Founded: December 15, 1818; 207 years ago
- Named for: Daniel Appling
- Seat: Baxley
- Largest city: Baxley

Area
  - Total: 512 sq mi (1,330 km^{2})
  - Land: 507 sq mi (1,310 km^{2})
  - Water: 5.2 sq mi (13 km^{2}) 1.0%

Population (2020)
  - Total: 18,444
  - Estimate (2025): 19,100 ▲
  - Density: 36.4/sq mi (14.0/km^{2})
- Time zone: UTC−5 (Eastern)
  - Summer (DST): UTC−4 (EDT)
- Congressional district: 1st
- Website: www.baxley.org

Appling County is a county located in the southern portion of the U.S. state of Georgia. As of the 2020 census, the population was 18,444. The county seat is Baxley.

== History ==
Appling County is named for Lieutenant Colonel Daniel Appling, a soldier in the War of 1812. Appling County, the 42nd county created in Georgia, was established by an act of the Georgia General Assembly on December 15, 1818. The original county consisted of Creek lands ceded in the 1814 Treaty of Fort Jackson and the 1818 Treaty of the Creek Agency.

Throughout the 1820s, the population of Appling County increased as the county was included in land lotteries by the Georgia General Assembly in 1820, 1821, 1827, and 1832. Large proportions of settlers at this time included South Carolinians and others from Tattnall County, Georgia.

On December 15, 1824, Ware County was formed by the Georgia General Assembly from roughly the southern half of Appling land districts 4, 5, and 6, and all of land districts 7, 8, 9, 10, 11, 12, and 13. On December 24, 1825, Appling County land district 6 was added to Telfair County by an act of the Georgia General Assembly. This created an ambiguity of the border between Telfair County and Ware County that was later solved by additional legislation.

On December 8, 1828, Holmesville, Georgia was declared the county seat by the General Assembly, following over ten years of disagreement by local judges. Previously, court was held at residence of William Carter Jr. In 1836, the General Assembly appointed a seven-member commission to find a location for a more centrally located county seat than Holmesville, but were not able to come to a conclusion. The need for a more central county seat would remain a point of contention in county politics for several decades.

On December 18, 1857, the part of Appling County that was south of Lightsey's Ford on Big Creek downstream to the Little Satilla River was taken from Appling County for the creation of Pierce County.

At the time of the 1850 United States census, Appling County had a white population of 2,520, a slave population of 404, and 25 free people of color. By the 1860 United States census, the county had a white population of 3,442, a slave population of 740, and 3 free people of color.

On August 27, 1872, eastern sections of Appling land districts 3 and 4 were added to Wayne County. This area included Wayne County's current county seat Jesup, Georgia, which became the new county seat of Wayne County in 1873. Also in August 1872, the General Assembly called for an election in Appling County to vote on the removal of the county seat to a point along the Macon and Brunswick Railroad. The residents voted for removal and the town of Baxley, Georgia was selected as the new county seat after the election. In February 1873, the General Assembly mistakenly passed a law giving county commissioners to sell the public lands in Holmesville so that the proceeds can go to the construction of a new courthouse in Holmesville. It amended the law a year later for the new courthouse location to read Baxley, as had originally been intended.

On August 18, 1905, Jeff Davis County was created from western portions of Appling County and eastern portions Coffee County. On July 27, 1914, Bacon County was created from parts of Appling County, Pierce County, and Ware County. The remaining section of Appling County that had been located south of Little Satilla River became part of Bacon County.

== Geography ==
According to the U.S. Census Bureau, the county has a total area of 512 square miles (1,330 km^{2}), of which 507 square miles (1,310 km^{2}) is land and 5.2 square miles (13 km^{2}) (1.0%) is water.

The southern two-thirds of Appling County, south of a line from Graham to Baxley, then running due east from Baxley, is located in the Little Satilla River sub-basin of the St. Marys River-Satilla River basin. The northern third of the county is located in the Altamaha River sub-basin of the basin by the same name.

=== Major highways ===
- U.S. Route 1 / State Route 4
- U.S. Route 23 / State Route 19
- U.S. Route 341 / State Route 27
- State Route 15
- State Route 121
- State Route 144
- State Route 169
- State Route 203

=== Adjacent counties ===
- Toombs County - north
- Tattnall County - northeast
- Wayne County - southeast
- Pierce County - south
- Jeff Davis County - west
- Bacon County - west

== Communities ==
=== Cities ===
- Baxley
- Graham

=== Town ===
- Surrency

=== Unincorporated Communities ===
- Holmesville

== Demographics ==
Historical population
| Census | Pop. | Note | %± |
|---|---|---|---|
| 1820 | 1,264 | | — |
| 1830 | 1,468 | | 16.1% |
| 1840 | 2,052 | | 39.8% |
| 1850 | 2,949 | | 43.7% |
| 1860 | 4,190 | | 42.1% |
| 1870 | 5,086 | | 21.4% |
| 1880 | 5,276 | | 3.7% |
| 1890 | 8,676 | | 64.4% |
| 1900 | 12,336 | | 42.2% |
| 1910 | 12,318 | | −0.1% |
| 1920 | 10,594 | | −14.0% |
| 1930 | 13,314 | | 25.7% |
| 1940 | 14,497 | | 8.9% |
| 1950 | 14,003 | | −3.4% |
| 1960 | 13,246 | | −5.4% |
| 1970 | 12,726 | | −3.9% |
| 1980 | 15,565 | | 22.3% |
| 1990 | 15,744 | | 1.2% |
| 2000 | 17,419 | | 10.6% |
| 2010 | 18,236 | | 4.7% |
| 2020 | 18,444 | | 1.1% |
| 2025 (est.) | 19,100 | ▲ | 3.6% |
U.S. Decennial Census; 1790-1880 1890-1910; 1920-1930 1930-1940; 1940-1950 1960-1980; 1980-2000 2010-2020

=== Racial and ethnic composition ===
Appling County, Georgia – Racial and ethnic composition Note: the US Census treats Hispanic/Latino as an ethnic category. This table excludes Latinos from the racial categories and assigns them to a separate category. Hispanics/Latinos may be of any race.
| Race / Ethnicity (NH = Non-Hispanic) | Pop 1980 | Pop 1990 | Pop 2000 | Pop 2010 | Pop 2020 | % 1980 | % 1990 | % 2000 | % 2010 | % 2020 |
|---|---|---|---|---|---|---|---|---|---|---|
| White alone (NH) | 12,309 | 12,286 | 13,053 | 12,854 | 12,674 | 79.08% | 78.04% | 74.94% | 70.49% | 68.72% |
| Black or African American alone (NH) | 3,103 | 3,266 | 3,398 | 3,360 | 3,339 | 19.94% | 20.74% | 19.51% | 18.43% | 18.10% |
| Native American or Alaska Native alone (NH) | 12 | 17 | 28 | 40 | 33 | 0.08% | 0.11% | 0.16% | 0.22% | 0.18% |
| Asian alone (NH) | 17 | 33 | 51 | 125 | 123 | 0.11% | 0.21% | 0.29% | 0.69% | 0.67% |
| Native Hawaiian or Pacific Islander alone (NH) | x | x | 1 | 11 | 1 | x | x | 0.01% | 0.06% | 0.01% |
| Other race alone (NH) | 0 | 4 | 4 | 10 | 32 | 0.00% | 0.03% | 0.02% | 0.05% | 0.17% |
| Mixed race or Multiracial (NH) | x | x | 92 | 132 | 417 | x | x | 0.53% | 0.72% | 2.26% |
| Hispanic or Latino (any race) | 124 | 138 | 792 | 1,704 | 1,825 | 0.80% | 0.88% | 4.55% | 9.34% | 9.89% |
| Total | 15,565 | 15,744 | 17,419 | 18,236 | 18,444 | 100.00% | 100.00% | 100.00% | 100.00% | 100.00% |

=== 2020 census ===
As of the 2020 census, the county had a population of 18,444. Of the residents, 24.3% were under the age of 18 and 17.9% were 65 years of age or older; the median age was 40.1 years. For every 100 females there were 98.3 males, and for every 100 females age 18 and over there were 97.2 males. 29.0% of residents lived in urban areas and 71.0% lived in rural areas.

The racial makeup of the county was 70.9% White, 18.4% Black or African American, 0.5% American Indian and Alaska Native, 0.7% Asian, 0.0% Native Hawaiian and Pacific Islander, 5.7% from some other race, and 3.8% from two or more races. Hispanic or Latino residents of any race comprised 9.9% of the population.

There were 7,135 households and 4,875 families residing in the county, of which 31.1% had children under the age of 18 living with them and 29.0% had a female householder with no spouse or partner present. About 27.5% of all households were made up of individuals and 12.9% had someone living alone who was 65 years of age or older.

There were 8,496 housing units, of which 16.0% were vacant. Among occupied housing units, 73.4% were owner-occupied and 26.6% were renter-occupied. The homeowner vacancy rate was 1.2% and the rental vacancy rate was 9.7%.

== Politics ==
As of the 2020s, Appling County is a Republican stronghold, voting 81% for Donald Trump in 2024. For elections to the United States House of Representatives, Appling County is part of Georgia's 1st congressional district, currently represented by Buddy Carter. For elections to the Georgia State Senate, Appling County is part of District 19. For elections to the Georgia House of Representatives, Appling County is divided between districts 157 and 178.

United States presidential election results for Appling County, Georgia
| Year | Republican | | Democratic | | Third party(ies) | |
| Year | No. | % | No. | % | No. | % |
|---|---|---|---|---|---|---|
| 1912 | 90 | 15.03% | 360 | 60.10% | 149 | 24.87% |
| 1916 | 44 | 7.67% | 413 | 71.95% | 117 | 20.38% |
| 1920 | 196 | 38.51% | 313 | 61.49% | 0 | 0.00% |
| 1924 | 44 | 17.12% | 212 | 82.49% | 1 | 0.39% |
| 1928 | 579 | 58.25% | 415 | 41.75% | 0 | 0.00% |
| 1932 | 64 | 9.62% | 601 | 90.38% | 0 | 0.00% |
| 1936 | 140 | 9.61% | 1,309 | 89.84% | 8 | 0.55% |
| 1940 | 312 | 16.94% | 1,514 | 82.19% | 16 | 0.87% |
| 1944 | 387 | 22.70% | 1,318 | 77.30% | 0 | 0.00% |
| 1948 | 289 | 9.01% | 2,268 | 70.72% | 650 | 20.27% |
| 1952 | 713 | 24.65% | 2,179 | 75.35% | 0 | 0.00% |
| 1956 | 506 | 22.74% | 1,719 | 77.26% | 0 | 0.00% |
| 1960 | 717 | 26.65% | 1,973 | 73.35% | 0 | 0.00% |
| 1964 | 2,597 | 62.44% | 1,562 | 37.56% | 0 | 0.00% |
| 1968 | 795 | 18.78% | 760 | 17.95% | 2,678 | 63.26% |
| 1972 | 2,755 | 84.33% | 512 | 15.67% | 0 | 0.00% |
| 1976 | 961 | 21.14% | 3,585 | 78.86% | 0 | 0.00% |
| 1980 | 1,961 | 39.17% | 2,985 | 59.62% | 61 | 1.22% |
| 1984 | 2,929 | 59.93% | 1,958 | 40.07% | 0 | 0.00% |
| 1988 | 3,000 | 61.74% | 1,837 | 37.81% | 22 | 0.45% |
| 1992 | 2,514 | 41.71% | 2,455 | 40.73% | 1,058 | 17.55% |
| 1996 | 2,572 | 50.44% | 2,070 | 40.60% | 457 | 8.96% |
| 2000 | 3,940 | 64.60% | 2,093 | 34.32% | 66 | 1.08% |
| 2004 | 4,494 | 70.52% | 1,848 | 29.00% | 31 | 0.49% |
| 2008 | 5,085 | 72.62% | 1,846 | 26.36% | 71 | 1.01% |
| 2012 | 5,233 | 73.78% | 1,758 | 24.78% | 102 | 1.44% |
| 2016 | 5,494 | 78.35% | 1,434 | 20.45% | 84 | 1.20% |
| 2020 | 6,570 | 78.31% | 1,784 | 21.26% | 36 | 0.43% |
| 2024 | 6,761 | 81.13% | 1,560 | 18.72% | 13 | 0.16% |

United States Senate election results for Appling County, Georgia2
| Year | Republican | | Democratic | | Third party(ies) | |
| Year | No. | % | No. | % | No. | % |
|---|---|---|---|---|---|---|
| 2020 | 6,306 | 77.02% | 1,753 | 21.41% | 128 | 1.56% |
| 2020 | 5,683 | 78.05% | 1,598 | 21.95% | 0 | 0.00% |

United States Senate election results for Appling County, Georgia3
| Year | Republican | | Democratic | | Third party(ies) | |
| Year | No. | % | No. | % | No. | % |
|---|---|---|---|---|---|---|
| 2020 | 2,355 | 28.86% | 1,051 | 12.88% | 4,753 | 58.25% |
| 2020 | 5,690 | 78.09% | 1,596 | 21.91% | 0 | 0.00% |
| 2022 | 5,344 | 80.13% | 1,260 | 18.89% | 65 | 0.97% |
| 2022 | 5,043 | 80.49% | 1,222 | 19.51% | 0 | 0.00% |

Georgia Gubernatorial election results for Appling County
| Year | Republican | | Democratic | | Third party(ies) | |
| Year | No. | % | No. | % | No. | % |
|---|---|---|---|---|---|---|
| 2022 | 5,552 | 82.83% | 1,131 | 16.87% | 20 | 0.30% |

== See also ==
- National Register of Historic Places listings in Appling County, Georgia
- List of counties in Georgia
