= Surrency, Georgia =

- Town
- Location in Appling County and the state of Georgia
- Coordinates: 31°43′27″N 82°11′55″W
- Country: United States
- State: Georgia
- County: Appling

Area
  - Total: 0.78 sq mi (2.01 km^{2})
  - Land: 0.77 sq mi (2.00 km^{2})
  - Water: 0 sq mi (0.00 km^{2})
- Elevation: 184 ft (56 m)

Population (2020)
  - Total: 194
  - Density: 251.0/sq mi (96.91/km^{2})
- Time zone: UTC-5 (Eastern (EST))
  - Summer (DST): UTC-4 (EDT)
- ZIP code: 31563
- Area code: 912
- FIPS code: 13-74852
- GNIS feature ID: 0333168

Surrency is a town in Appling County, Georgia, United States. The population was 194 in 2020.

== History ==
The Georgia General Assembly incorporated Surrency as a town in 1911. The community was named after Millard Surrency, a pioneer citizen.

== Geography ==
Surrency is located at 31°43′27″N 82°11′55″W. According to the United States Census Bureau, the town has a total area of 0.8 square mile (2.0 km^{2}), all land.

=== Climate ===
Climate data for Surrency, Georgia, 1991–2020 normals, extremes 1956–2003
Month	Jan	Feb	Mar	Apr	May	Jun	Jul	Aug	Sep	Oct	Nov	Dec	Year
Record high °F (°C)	83 (28)	88 (31)	90 (32)	96 (36)	98 (37)	106 (41)	105 (41)	105 (41)	100 (38)	94 (34)	88 (31)	83 (28)	106 (41)
Mean daily maximum °F (°C)	63.0 (17.2)	66.8 (19.3)	73.2 (22.9)	80.3 (26.8)	86.3 (30.2)	91.2 (32.9)	92.0 (33.3)	90.4 (32.4)	87.8 (31.0)	80.6 (27.0)	71.4 (21.9)	65.5 (18.6)	79.0 (26.1)
Daily mean °F (°C)	51.0 (10.6)	53.5 (11.9)	59.5 (15.3)	66.1 (18.9)	72.6 (22.6)	79.4 (26.3)	81.0 (27.2)	79.7 (26.5)	76.6 (24.8)	67.8 (19.9)	58.2 (14.6)	52.8 (11.6)	66.5 (19.2)
Mean daily minimum °F (°C)	39.0 (3.9)	40.3 (4.6)	45.8 (7.7)	51.9 (11.1)	58.8 (14.9)	67.6 (19.8)	70.0 (21.1)	68.9 (20.5)	65.4 (18.6)	55.0 (12.8)	45.0 (7.2)	40.2 (4.6)	54.0 (12.2)
Record low °F (°C)	1 (−17)	12 (−11)	16 (−9)	29 (−2)	39 (4)	48 (9)	55 (13)	56 (13)	38 (3)	24 (−4)	19 (−7)	3 (−16)	1 (−17)
Average precipitation inches (mm)	3.57 (91)	3.44 (87)	3.88 (99)	2.63 (67)	3.23 (82)	5.29 (134)	4.98 (126)	5.62 (143)	4.25 (108)	2.70 (69)	2.25 (57)	3.82 (97)	45.66 (1,160)
Average precipitation days (≥ 0.01 in)	9.8	7.3	8.8	6.2	6.7	11.8	11.4	10.9	8.8	5.9	5.9	7.8	101.3
Source 1: NOAA
Source 2: XMACIS2

== Demographics ==
Historical population
Census	Pop.	Note	%±
1910	259		—
1920	433		67.2%
1930	445		2.8%
1940	431		−3.1%
1950	295		−31.6%
1960	312		5.8%
1970	352		12.8%
1980	368		4.5%
1990	253		−31.2%
2000	237		−6.3%
2010	201		−15.2%
2020	194		−3.5%
U.S. Decennial Census

As of the census of 2000, there were 237 people, 98 households, and 69 families residing in the town. By 2020, its population declined to 194.
