= Murder of Barbara Tucker =

1980 murder in Oregon

Barbara Tucker
- Portrait of Tucker
- Born: February 25, 1960; Portland, Oregon, U.S.
- Died: January 15, 1980 (aged 19); Gresham, Oregon, U.S.
- Cause of death: Homicide by blunt force trauma

Barbara Mae Tucker (February 25, 1960 – January 15, 1980) was an American woman who was kidnapped, sexually assaulted, and murdered on the campus of Mt. Hood Community College in Gresham, Oregon. Her murder remained the city's oldest cold case for over four decades.

A native of Portland, Tucker was a business student at the college at the time of her murder. She disappeared on the evening of January 15, 1980, after failing to arrive at a night class. Around 6:45pm that night, multiple motorists witnessed Tucker running into traffic on Southeast Kane Drive from a wooded slope on the college campus, followed by an unknown man who forced her back into the wooded area. Only one motorist stopped their vehicle, with the others later reporting that they assumed Tucker and the man were attempting to jaywalk or playing a prank. Her body was discovered in a grove on the college campus the following morning. She had been strangled, sexually assaulted, and bludgeoned to death.

In 2021, a suspect, Robert Arthur Plympton (born 1963), was arrested and charged with Tucker's murder. Plympton became a formal suspect earlier that year after a genealogist with Parabon NanoLabs, a company specializing in DNA phenotyping, identified him as a match to DNA samples taken from Tucker's body. Plympton had previously served a two-year prison sentence for the 1985 attempted kidnapping of a young woman in the Gresham area. Following a bench trial, Plympton was convicted of Tucker's murder on October 3, 2024 and received a sentence of life imprisonment.

== Background ==
Barbara Mae Tucker was born February 25, 1960 in Portland, the youngest of eight children. She graduated from Cleveland High School in 1978 before enrolling at Mt. Hood Community College in nearby Gresham. Tucker, who stood 5 feet 11.5 inches (1.816 m) tall, was a basketball player and enrolled at the college as a business major. She resided in the Ash Mountain Apartments, a student housing apartment complex near the campus. Tucker was employed at a department store in Portland.

== Disappearance ==
On the evening of January 15, 1980, Tucker failed to arrive at a 7:00pm scheduled class. Shortly before, around 6:45pm, several motorists driving by the Mt. Hood Community College campus witnessed Tucker running onto Northeast Kane Drive from a wooded slope on the campus's west end. The passing motorists stated that it appeared Tucker was attempting to flag down passing cars, and at least one had to brake to avoid hitting her. Moments later, the witnesses observed a man emerge from the wooded area and force Tucker off the road, leading her back into the forest. Per witness statements, several of the motorists assumed Tucker and the man were attempting to jaywalk or play a prank.

Lisa Michaels, the only driver who stopped after Tucker leapt in front her car, stated that when she exited her vehicle, she observed the man sling his arm over Tucker before leading her back into the wooded area. When Michaels asked what was wrong, neither responded. One of the witnesses recounted that it appeared Tucker had dirt and blood smeared on her face.

Per one witness statement, the unknown man was described being a "stocky" and approximately in his twenties, wearing a navy blue parka, grey pants, and a beige stocking cap.

== Discovery ==
On the morning of January 16, 1980, students discovered Tucker's body in grove of trees next to a parking lot on the campus's south side. She was nude from the waist down, and her purse and several textbooks were found scattered nearby.

A medical examiner determined that Tucker been strangled and bludgeoned with a "heavy object," sustaining blunt force trauma to the head which caused her death. She had also been sexually assaulted, possibly after death. Her body bore defensive wounds suggesting she had struggled with her assailant.

== Investigation ==
=== Initial efforts ===
Original suspect composite sketch

In the week following Tucker's murder, the Multnomah County Fire Department drained and searched a lake on the campus near the crime scene in search of evidence. News outlets released several sketches of potential suspects, including one of an unknown man who had been seen standing at a bus stop near the campus. Despite the efforts of law enforcement, Tucker's murder soon became a cold case.

In 2000, the Oregon State Police Crime Lab developed a DNA profile for a suspect using vaginal swabs taken during Tucker's autopsy.

=== 2021 arrest of Robert Plympton ===
On June 8, 2021, authorities arrested 58-year-old Troutdale resident Robert Plympton, charging him with Tucker's rape and murder. Plympton became a suspect in the case earlier that year after a genealogist with Parabon NanoLabs, a company specializing in DNA phenotyping, identified him as a likely contributor to the then-unknown DNA profile. Plympton, who was sixteen years old at the time of Tucker's murder, lived under 1 mile (1.6 km) from the crime scene. After a period of surveillance, Oregon State Police were able to positively match Plympton's DNA using a piece of chewing gum he discarded while bicycling along the Sandy River.

Plympton had an extensive criminal record, including multiple charges for driving under the influence and assault, as well as receiving restraining orders. In February 1985, he was arrested for the attempted kidnapping of Patricia Spangler, who accepted a ride from him before he attacked and attempted to bind her arms with duct tape. He served two and a half years for the attempted kidnapping, and Spangler subsequently provided testimony during the trial for Tucker's murder.

=== 2024 conviction ===
Following a three-week bench trial in March 2024, Plympton was found guilty of first-degree murder, as well as four counts of different theories of murder in the second degree. On October 3, 2024, he was sentenced to life imprisonment.
