= Jay Cook =

Jay Cook may refer to:

- Jay Cook (murder victim)
- Jay Cooke, American financier
