= Death of Steven Crawford =

Formerly unidentified decedent

Steven Crawford
- Born: Steven Alexander Crawford; October 2, 1960
- Died: c. July 11, 1963 (aged 2)
- Body discovered: July 11, 1963
- Known for: Formerly unidentified decedent

Steven Alexander "Stevie" Crawford (October 2, 1960 – c. July 11, 1963) was a formerly unidentified toddler whose body was found in a reservoir in Ashland, Oregon, on July 11, 1963. He was identified in 2021 using GEDmatch.

== Discovery ==
On July 11, 1963, an Oregon man reeled in the remains of a toddler while fishing in Ashland's Keene Creek Reservoir. He initially thought he had discovered a blanket roll, not realizing what he had found until after he removed it from the water. The man then reported his findings to the police.

== Initial investigation ==
Investigators discovered that the blankets, along with a quilt, were bound with wire and filled with heavy iron molds to keep the toddler's body from reaching the surface of the creek. The coroner performed an autopsy the next day, and estimated that the boy had died sometime after October 1962. The coroner labeled the cause of the toddler's death as unknown but probably suspicious. After a month of attempting to identify the child's remains and countless tips, investigators gave up and shelved his case. The child was buried at Hillcrest Memorial Park Cemetery in a plastic casket with a gravestone that read "Baby Doe, Known only to God." The case was not investigated again for another 45 years.

== Renewed interest ==
In 2007, Detective Sergeant Colin Fagan asked Jackson County investigator Jim Tattersall to look through boxes in the Jackson County courthouse's basement for old files on cold cases. Doing this, he came across the unidentified young boy's case and informed Fagan. The two then committed to identifying the toddler.

In 2008, the child's remains were exhumed, and his DNA was sent to the Combined DNA Index System. However, no profiles in the database matched the child.

In 2010, investigators took the boy's skull to a dentist's office equipped with a 360-degree X-ray machine and photographed it. The National Center for Missing & Exploited Children then took these images and created a facial reconstruction of the child. The dentists also told the investigators that the boy might have had Down syndrome. The skull was then sent to a forensic odontologist, who could not match any dental records in a database to the child. The case went cold again, and the child was reburied.

== Identification ==
In December 2020, the Jackson County Sheriff's Office submitted the boy's DNA to Parabon NanoLabs and GEDmatch for phenotyping and genealogical analysis with the help of GEDmatch's chief genealogist, CeCe Moore. She identified a half-brother living in Ohio and interviewed him. This led to her finding that the boy was two-year-old Steven "Stevie" Crawford, a boy who was born with Down syndrome.

Crawford's family in New Mexico told detectives that he went missing after his mother took him on a trip with her. When she returned without Stevie, she told the rest of her family that they "would not have to worry about him anymore." She has since died. After the identification, the boy’s remains were again exhumed, and were reburied in a family plot in New Mexico.

== See also ==
- List of solved missing person cases (1950–1969)
- List of unsolved murders (1900–1979)
