= John Charles Bolsinger =

American serial killer

- Born: September 17, 1957; Springfield, Oregon, U.S.
- Died: March 23, 1988 (aged 30); Springfield, Oregon, U.S.
- Cause of death: Suicide
- Conviction: Manslaughter (reduced from second degree murder on appeal)
- Penalty: 5 years to life

Details
- Victims: 4
- Span of crimes: 1980–1988
- Country: United States
- States: Utah, Oregon
- Date apprehended: April 3, 1980

John Charles Bolsinger (September 17, 1957 – March 23, 1988) was an American serial killer who was posthumously linked to the murders of three women in Eugene, Oregon from 1986 to 1988, committed after his release from prison for a 1980 murder in Utah. He was never convicted of the latter homicides, as he committed suicide shortly after the final murder, and was linked to them via DNA analysis from Oregon State Police and Parabon NanoLabs in 2022.

== First murder and imprisonment ==
On March 29, 1980, Bolsinger was living in Magna, Utah when he entered an apartment complex at 8044 W. 3500 South, where he planned to have sex with the resident, 33-year-old Kaysie Sorensen, whom he had met in a bar earlier that day. At some point, it was alleged that she made fun of him, and his reaction was to tie a cord from a clock radio around her neck and strangle her. After killing her, Bolsinger stole a stereo from the apartment and left, leaving the building manager to discover her body on the following day. A preliminary autopsy determined that Sorensen had been strangled, and concluded that she might have been sexually assaulted.

A few days later, Bolsinger was arrested and charged with second-degree murder, being held in jail on $100,000 bail. He was then remanded at the Salt Lake County Jail to await trial. The first preliminary hearing was held at the end of April 1980. At the murder trial itself, the main focus was to determine whether Bolsinger had strangled Sorensen intentionally or accidentally. To support their claims that it was accidental, defense attorneys brought in testimony from Dr. Boyd Stephens, a San Francisco-based coroner who said that the woman's death was the result of heart failure caused by compression on her chest. This was questioned by District Attorney Lynn Payne, who claimed that Bolsinger had strangled her after she allegedly insulted him. In the end, Bolsinger was found guilty of murder and given a 5-year-to-life term.

Near the end of his sentence, Bolsinger's conviction was quashed by the Utah Supreme Court by a 3–1 decision, citing the state's failure to provide solid evidence that he intended "grave bodily harm" to Sorensen. As a result, his conviction was reduced to manslaughter, and Bolsinger was subsequently set a parole date of April 8, 1986. In December 1985, Bolsinger was one of four convicts who made an appeal to the Utah Supreme Court, asking that they should have been provided adequate research opportunity for their civil cases, which the Utah State Prison lacked, but their joint appeal was rejected.

== Release and new murders ==
After finishing his sentence, Bolsinger was paroled to his hometown of Springfield, Oregon. Not long after his release, on June 5, 1986, the body of 62-year-old Gladys Mae Hensley was found lying on the floor of her apartment in Eugene by an employee of the apartment complex. Two weeks later, on June 19, the half-nude body of 33-year-old Janice Marie Dickinson was found beneath a tree behind a car dealership's parking lot by an auto mechanic. Due to the similarity of the two cases, detectives believed that the cases were related, but had no clues that could lead to a potential suspect. The Eugene Police Department even hired a retired police chief who had previously worked on the Atlanta child murders and the Green River Killer cases to help, but it was to no avail.

While police were investigating the Hensley-Dickinson murders, Bolsinger was arrested for attempting to burglarize a woman's apartment in Springfield in the middle of the night. According to the unnamed woman's testimony, she had heard her dog barking and went in to check, only to find him peering through her kitchen window. She ran towards the living room and phoned 911, and while she was still on the phone, Bolsinger, who by then had entered the household, walked towards her and attempted to yank the phone from her hands. The woman then started hitting him with the phone and a flashlight, causing him to retreat to the kitchen and flee, leaving behind a down vest and a kitchen knife. Not long after, Bolsinger was arrested by a K9 unit and interrogated about the crime, during which he claimed that he had simply knocked on the door and walked away, but, as a result of amnesia, could not remember anything after this point. He was subsequently found guilty and given a 5-year prison term, which he was ordered to serve at the Utah State Prison. He remained there until December 8, 1987, when he was paroled for good behavior. Three days after his release, Bolsinger enrolled at the Lane Community College in Eugene.

On February 27, 1988, three months after his release from prison, Bolsinger broke into the Franklin Boulevard home of 73-year-old Geraldine Spencer Toohey, who was talking on the phone with her sister. After cutting the phone lines, he stabbed, raped and ultimately strangled her, before fleeing the household. Toohey's body was found by her sister the next day, and days after her murder, the Oregon State Police released a sketch of the suspect.

== Suicide, investigation and identification ==
While he was not considered a suspect in any of the murders, Bolsinger nonetheless committed suicide at his home in Springfield on March 23, 1988, less than a month after killing Toohey. The connection between the Hensley-Dickinson and the Toohey murders remained speculative until 2000 when, in August, all three were linked via DNA.

As there were no leads, the cases remained cold until 2016, when the Eugene Police Department contacted Parabon NanoLabs, who created a snapshot of the suspect based on DNA extracted from the crime scenes. Over the following years, the police investigated all possible suspects, eventually narrowing it down to four people, one of whom was Bolsinger. After extensive investigations, they excluded the other suspects via footprints and fingerprints. In February 2022, the Eugene Police Department announced at a press conference that Bolsinger was identified as the killer of the three women and that the cases were now officially closed.

== See also ==
- Parabon NanoLabs
- List of serial killers in the United States
