= Joseph Stephen Holt =

American murderer

- Holt in 1977
- Born: November 8, 1947; Tulsa, Oklahoma, U.S.
- Died: April 6, 2014 (aged 66); South Lake Tahoe, California, U.S.

Details
- Victims: 2+
- Span of crimes: 1977 – 1979 (known)
- Country: United States
- State: California

Joseph Stephen Holt (November 8, 1947 – April 6, 2014) was an American murderer and suspected serial killer who was posthumously linked via DNA to two murders committed in South Lake Tahoe, California, from 1977 to 1979. Holt, a real estate agent, was never convicted in his lifetime and died without being considered a suspect in 2014. Since his identification in 2019, authorities have been investigating whether he could be responsible for more violent crimes committed in the state.

== Early life ==
Joseph Stephen Holt was born on November 8, 1947, in Tulsa, Oklahoma, the first child of an airline pilot and a high school teacher. Shortly after his birth, the family began moving around various locations before finally settling in San Jose, California, where Holt spent most of his youth. After graduating from the Cupertino High School, he studied political science at UC Santa Barbara and later UC Berkeley, receiving a bachelor's degree. He moved to South Lake Tahoe in 1974, where he soon began a career in real estate, holding down that job up until his death. As a realtor, he frequently traveled between San Jose and South Lake Tahoe, and was regarded as very familiar with the area.

== Murders ==
On July 24, 1977, 27-year-old Brynn Rainey, an Ohio woman employed at the Sahara Tahoe Casino in Stateline, Nevada, vanished after she was last seen at the Bittercreek Saloon. When she did not arrive at work for her usual shift the next day, she was reported missing, but after checking her apartment, authorities found that nothing had been stolen. Rainey remained missing for a little over a month until August 20, when a horseback rider found a shallow grave near the Stateline Stables. He reported the finding to the police, who soon identified the decomposing body inside of it as that of Rainey. From what little forensic evidence could be gathered, it was ascertained that she had been raped and then strangled to death.

Two years later, on June 30, 1979, 16-year-old Carol Andersen traveled from her home in Stateline to a house party at Regan Beach, near South Lake Tahoe. After partying the entire night and declining rides home from her friends, Andersen likely traveled on foot before hitching a ride from a passing motorist. The next morning, a motorist passing by the Pioneer Trail discovered the lifeless body of what appeared to be a teenage girl. After informing authorities, the body was sent for autopsy in Sacramento, California, where the coroner positively identified her as Andersen. It was determined that she had been bound, gagged and strangled by her killer, who made no effort to conceal her corpse.

== Identification ==
Despite efforts to solve the two women's cases, authorities at the time were unable to, thus rendering them cold for more than four decades. Both cases were shelved until 2007, when the El Dorado County Sheriff's Office formed a cold case task force, which reexamined Rainey and Andersen's murders. The first breaks came in 2012 and 2013, respectively, after they managed to obtain genetic samples from the suspected perpetrator and entered them into CODIS, but to their disappointment, no positive matches were returned. The cases were shelved until 2017, when the agency used genetic genealogy to determine that both killings were committed by the same perpetrator.

Afterwards, they contacted Parabon NanoLabs to test some blood and DNA samples found on articles of clothing from the crime scenes, which eventually allowed them to zero in on the Holt family. Not long after contacting the family members, including one of Holt's biological children who agreed to provide a DNA sample from his father's old toothbrush, authorities were able to conclusively link Holt's DNA to both crime scenes. However, he could not be arrested, as he had died in his South Lake Tahoe home on April 6, 2014, from a heart attack.

After searching through Holt's various belongings, police found a newspaper clipping about an unsolved 1975 shooting in Los Gatos, in which the victim had survived. Queries to the local police department returned a sketch of the suspect in said shooting, which appeared to be a near-perfect match to what Holt looked like at the time. As a result, police have since suspected that he likely has committed other violent crimes centering around the South Lake Tahoe and San Jose area, and are seeking any potential links to unsolved cases that could be linked back to Holt.

== See also ==
- Parabon NanoLabs
