= Parabon NanoLabs =

American DNA company

Coordinates: 38°57′08″N 77°20′05″W

Parabon NanoLabs, Inc.
- Type: Private
- Industry: Biotechnology, DNA phenotyping
- Founded: 2008
- Founders: Steven Armentrout; Michael Norton; Christopher Dwyer
- Headquarters: Reston, Virginia, U.S.
- Area served: United States (and international clients)
- Key people: Steven Armentrout (CEO)
- Products: DNA testing and forensic analysis services; Nanopharmaceutical development; InSēquio Design Studio (DNA nanotechnology software)
- Services: DNA phenotyping; Genetic genealogy; Kinship analysis
- Website: www.parabon-nanolabs.com

Parabon NanoLabs, Inc. is an American company based in Reston, Virginia that develops nanopharmaceuticals and provides DNA phenotyping services for law enforcement organizations.

== History ==
Parabon NanoLabs, a subsidiary of Parabon Computation, a computing software provider, was founded in 2008 by Steven Armentrout, Michael Norton and Christopher Dwyer. In 2018 Armentrout was the chief executive officer and President of Parabon Computation. Parabon NanoLabs has developed oncology therapeutics and synthetic vaccines using nanotechnology and DNA phenotyping.

== Products ==
=== inSēquio Design Studio ===
Together with the Edgewood Chemical Biological Center, the United States Army Research Office and the National Science Foundation as part of a project in the Federal Small Business Innovation Research program, Parabon developed a computer aided design software called inSēquio Design Studio for nanoengineering DNA constructs. This software was used to design and develop synthetic vaccines.

=== Snapshot ===
Snapshot DNA Phenotyping Service is the name of a DNA phenotyping tool developed by Parabon NanoLabs which creates composite face imaging sketches based on DNA samples. The algorithms used to make the composites are not open source, however, which has attracted criticism from members of the scientific community. Moses Schanfield, professor of forensic sciences at George Washington University, criticized the lack of any peer review, noting that there is no publicly available performance record for the product. In a 2016 article the American Civil Liberties Union recommended only using genetic phenotyping "...where the link between genes and external characteristics is based on well-proven, peer-reviewed, widely accepted science, such as is apparently now the case with hair and eye color." Skin color predictions have been reported to be somewhat reliable but not predictions of the shape of the face. North Carolina detectives felt Parabon's Snapshot DNA Phenotyping Service had been helpful in identifying Jose Alvarez Jr. in 2015 as the killer of Troy and LaDonna French in 2012. Privacy restrictions in 2019 on the use of GEDmatch for genetic genealogy may make DNA phenotyping more common. Illumina, Inc. and Identitas AG are reported to offer similar DNA phenotyping services. The United States Department of Defense provided approximately $2,000,000 in development financing for Snapshot.

=== Keystone ===
Parabon NanoLabs was awarded a two-year contract by the United States Department of Defense to develop a software platform dubbed 'Keystone' for the forensic analysis of DNA evidence.

=== Genetic genealogy ===
In May 2018 Parabon NanoLabs appointed genealogist CeCe Moore as head of their genetic genealogy unit with three genealogists working for her.

In cooperation with American law enforcement, Parabon uploaded DNA evidence from crime scenes to GEDmatch in an attempt to identify perpetrators.

In November 2018 Parabon said they were working on 200 cases, 55% had produced leads and in May 2019 they said were solving cold cases at the rate of one a week.

In May 2019, GEDmatch required people who had uploaded their DNA to its site to specifically opt in to allow law enforcement agencies to access their information. This change in privacy policy was forecast to make it much more difficult in the future for law enforcement agencies and Parabon to identify suspects and solve cold cases using genetic genealogy.

According to an article published by Los Angeles Times in November 2019, "[CeCe] Moore said Parabon has opened about 300 DNA searches and that the lab has solved almost 100 cases — though arrests have not yet been made in several dozen of those cases." In May 2020 it was reported that Parabon had participated in nearly 500 cases with 109 suspect positive identifications.

In December 2019, it was announced that GEDmatch was sold to forensic, for-profit, DNA analysis company Verogen, whose CEO Brett Williams vowed to make the database safer for its customers, including fighting search warrants.

In a May 2020 interview with Scott Fisher of the podcast Extreme Genes, Moore revealed that in her capacity as the genetic genealogy lead, she no longer uses GEDmatch exclusively because of the decline of profiles available to law enforcement. Moore stated, "So, it would be better obviously, if we still had access to the full [GEDmatch] database, that million plus profiles, but it hasn't stopped us. Also, we are using Family Tree DNA more and more all the time. Parabon is not able to upload directly but the agencies we work with can get the raw data from us and upload it to Family Tree DNA and then come back with that login information for us. So, we're also helping to solve some cases with Family Tree DNA matches now. And as you know, theirs is the opt-out situation where you're automatically opted in if you're a US customer, unless you choose to opt out." This restricted direct-access limitation may be due to the fact that FamilyTreeDNA has their own genetic genealogy consultant, Barbara Rae-Venter, who solved the Golden State Killer cold case in May 2018.

On 26 May 2020, the ABC television network premiered The Genetic Detective, featuring Parabon's Moore, Steven Armentrout, Ph.D., and Ellen McRae Greytak, Ph.D. The hour-long episodes feature cases that Moore's genetic genealogy team has worked on since she started with Parabon.

The following list of case results may offer an overview of Parabon's increasing activity.

==== Case results: To trial ====
The following cases include suspects who were identified and then arrested for the indicated offenses. All suspects are considered innocent until proven guilty in a court of law. Convictions are highlighted in green.

Suspect(s)	Offense(s) and victim(s)	Location of offense(s)	Offense date(s)	Arrested	Outcome
Felipe Vianney Hernandez Tellez	Rape and murder of 26-year-old Adrienne "Sunny" Sudweeks	Costa Mesa, California, USA	1997-02-22	Fugitive	DNA and fingerprint evidence was used to match Tellez, a Mexican national living in Santa Ana at the time, to the crime scene. He was found to be living in Oaxaca, Mexico, but so far has not been extradited to stand trial for Sudweeks' murder.
Kenneth Canzater Jr.	Murders of 25-year-old Candra Alston and her 3-year-old daughter Malaysia Boykin	Columbia, South Carolina, USA	2011-01-07	2017-03-23	Canzater, an acquaintance of Alston who had previously been considered a suspect in the case, was linked to the crime scene via a partial palm print that was later matched to his DNA, obtained from a 2005 robbery conviction in California. He was later arrested at a motel in Corona, California, and extradited to South Carolina to face trial. In 2020, he was convicted on two counts of voluntary manslaughter and sentenced to 20 years imprisonment.
Jason David Martinez and Kadian Andre Garfield Roper	Murder of 31-year-old Michael Todd Hamilton	Coral Springs, Florida, USA	2011-07-11	2017-09-19	Both men's DNA was linked to the crime via spit and a juice bottle recovered that they had left behind. Martinez, who was living in Manhattan, New York City, and refused to provide a DNA swab, has pleaded not guilty, while Roper has implicated both himself and the former in Hamilton's murder. In June 2023, Martinez was convicted of the murder and sentenced to life imprisonment.
Hugo Giron-Polanco	Sexual battery and rape	Davie, Florida, USA	2010-11-26	2017-12-28	Giron-Polanco, an illegal immigrant from El Salvador, was linked to the crime via saliva police had collected from his victims' breast. He was charged with the rape, convicted and sentenced to 12 years imprisonment.
Oscar Roberto Nunez Gonzalez	Sexual assault of a 4-year-old	Mesa, Arizona, USA	2017-01-09	2018-03-14	Gonzalez was initially arrested on a DUI charge, but a DNA sample acquired from him was later matched to the crime scene. He has admitted guilt in the case, and is now charged with one count of sexual conduct with a minor, one count of public sexual indecency and one count of second-degree burglary. In 2019, Gonzalez pleaded guilty to one count of child molestation and was sentenced to 20 years in prison.
William Earl Talbott II	Murders of Tanya Van Cuylenborg and Jay Cook	Snohomish County, Washington, USA	1987-11-18	2018-05-17	Was found guilty of two counts of aggregated first-degree murder on June 28, 2019. On July 24, 2019, Talbott was sentenced to serve two consecutive life sentences without the possibility of parole. This case was the first in which CeCe Moore provided a suspect's name based on extensive genetic genealogical research. It is also the first conviction in which genetic genealogy played an integral part. CeCe Moore was interviewed (audio recording) about this case and the future of genetic genealogy considering the new restrictions that have come as a result of privacy concerns.
Gary Charles Hartman	Rape and murder of 12-year-old Michella Welch	Tacoma, Washington, USA	1986-03-26	2018-06-20	Hartman and a brother were first identified as persons of interest, but Hartman was ultimately identified using DNA from a discarded napkin. In 2019 Washington state passed "Jennifer and Michella's law" named after Michella Welch and Jennifer Bastian (see below). This law allowed police more latitude in taking DNA samples from convicted sex offenders. In 2022, he was sentenced to 26 years imprisonment.
Alexander Christopher Ewing	"Hammer Murders" of the Bennett family	Aurora, Colorado, USA	1984-01-16	2018-07-10	In addition to the murders of Bruce, Patricia and Melissa Bennett and the attempted murder of Vanessa Bennet, the then-unidentified killer's DNA was linked to the rape-murder of 50-year-old Patricia Smith in Lakewood six days earlier. At the time of his arrest, Ewing was serving a sentence in Nevada for the attempted murder of a couple near Henderson. In July 2021, he was found guilty of the Colorado crimes and sentenced to three consecutive life terms.
Matthew Norman Dusseault	Stabbing death of 81-year-old Constance Gauthier	Woonsocket, Rhode Island, USA	2016-03-23	2018-07-18	Dusseault's DNA matched the crime scene DNA and when interviewed by police, he implicated Tyler Grenon. Both men were charged with murder and conspiracy, however the charges against Grenon have since been dropped and Dusseault is being held without bail. Convicted in January 2025.
Michael Frank Allen Henslick	Fatal stabbing and sexual assault of 22-year-old Holly Cassano	Champaign, Illinois, USA	2009-11-02	2018-08-28	Although a convicted felon, Henslick had managed to avoid DNA testing. A discarded cigarette butt was used to connect him with the Cassano murder after genetic genealogy identified him as a person of interest. At the time of the murder Henslick lived a few blocks away from Cassano in a mobile home park. Police said he admitted to Cassano's murder when arrested but Henslick pleaded not guilty at his trial. Henslick was convicted in February 2020 and sentenced the following June to life in prison without parole. Because he had continued to evade court-ordered collection of his DNA to be placed in CODIS with past convictions, a serious look at collection enforcement in felony cases has been proposed by Cassano's mother, who wants federal law to be changed so that DNA is taken immediately in the courtroom at the time of conviction.
Marlon Michael Alexander	Serial rapes	Montgomery County, Maryland, USA	2007 - 2011	2018-09-13	Attacked at least four elderly women in Gaithersburg and Germantown, forcing two of his victims to have sex with him. Alexander would later plead guilty to first-degree rape and first-degree sexual assault at his trial, receiving a life term.
Luke Edward Fleming	Rape and murder of 47-year-old Deborah Dalzell	Sarasota County, Florida, USA	1999-03-29	2018-09-16	Fleming lived about seven-tenths of a mile from Dalzell's home at the time of her murder. In February 2020, he received two life sentences in prison.
Benjamin Lee Holmes Jr.	Armed robbery and murder of 25-year-old student Christine Franke	Orlando, Florida, USA	2001-10-21	2018–11	After building a family tree, genetic genealogists identified Holmes and his brother as the most likely suspects. Police obtained a warrant for Holmes's DNA and found it matched the DNA left at the crime scene, eliminating his brother as a suspect. He was convicted of the murder and sentenced to life imprisonment without parole in March 2023.
Christopher Quinn Williams	Multiple burglaries and assaults of women	Montgomery County, Texas, USA	2015 - 2018	2018-12-08	Williams' DNA has been linked to at least 4 open cases, while there could be as many as 16. He was released on $160,000 bond on the same day as his arrest. In August 2022, Williams was convicted and sentenced to life in prison.
Robert Steven Wright	Murder of 23-year-old Renée Sweeney	Greater Sudbury, Ontario, Canada	1998-01-27	2018-12-11	Wright, an 18-year-old student at the Lockerby Composite School at the time of the murder, was arrested at his workplace at the North Bay Regional Health Centre. His trial was scheduled for October 25, 2021, following numerous delays due to the COVID-19 pandemic was rescheduled for February 2023. He was convicted of second-degree murder on March 29, 2023.
Jerry Lynn Burns	Murder of 18-year-old Michelle Martinko	Cedar Rapids, Iowa, USA	1979-12-19	2018-12-19	Burns was "linked by DNA from blood found on Martinko's clothing and elsewhere in the car at the crime scene." Burns was convicted of first degree murder on February 24, 2020.
Russell Anthony Guerrero	Murder of 30-year-old Jack Upton	Fremont, California, USA	1990-12-17	2019-01-22	The warrant for Guerrero's arrest was made January 17, 2019, but he was living in Arizona at the time. He was arrested a few days later and is now awaiting extradition to California.
Michael A. Soares	Murder of 66-year-old John "Jack" Fay	Warwick, Rhode Island, USA	2013-05-17	2019-02-05	Soares, a resident of Pawtucket, was arrested for Fay's murder after a DNA analysis linked his blood to a tissue left at the crime scene. He has since been arraigned at court, and has pleaded not guilty to the crime. In January 2023, Soares was found guilty and convicted.
Steven Harris Downs	Rape and murder of 20-year-old University of Alaska student Sophie Sergie	Fairbanks, Alaska, USA	1993-04-26	2019-02-15	Downs was working as a nurse in Maine and was extradited to Alaska upon his arrest. Downs pleaded not guilty on August 14, 2019, and bail was set at $1 million. In September 2022, he was sentenced to a total of 75 years imprisonment.
Thomas Lewis Garner	Murder of 25-year-old US Naval basic training graduate Pamela Cahanes	Sanford, Florida, USA	1984-08-04	2019-03-13	Garner was Cahanes' classmate at the Navy's training center and the two knew each other, according to the Seminole County sheriff's office. Garner was convicted of the murder on May 6, 2021, and sentenced to life imprisonment. He has also been linked to the 1982 cold case murder of Kathy Hicks in Honolulu, Hawaii, and was charged with the murder in June 2021.
Theresa Rose (Josten) Bentaas	Death of her abandoned baby	Sioux Falls, South Dakota, USA	1981-02-28	2019-03-08	The full-term baby boy died due to exposure. Bentaas told authorities that she had hidden her pregnancy and gave birth while alone in her apartment, according to a court affidavit. In December 2021, Bentaas was convicted of manslaughter and sentenced to 10 years imprisonment, nine of which are suspended.
Raymond Lawrence Vannieuwenhoven	Murder of 25-year-old David Schuldes and the sexual aggression and murder of Schuldes' fiancée, 24-year-old Ellen Matheys	Silver Cliff, Wisconsin, USA	1976-07-09	2019-03-14	Vannieuwenhoven was charged with two counts of first degree murder and pleaded not guilty. He was held on a $1 million bond. In August 2021, he was found guilty and sentenced to two consecutive life terms in prison. He died in prison on June 17, 2022.
Coley Lewis McCraney	Murder of Tracie Hawlett and sexual assault and murder of J.B. Beasley (both 17 years old)	Ozark, Alabama, USA	1999-08-01	2019-03-16	McCraney is a truck driver and preacher with no criminal record. He voluntarily gave his DNA, which was found to match the DNA from the crime scene. He was convicted of capital murder in April 2023 and sentenced to life imprisonment without parole.
Todd Barket	Robbery and subsequent murder of 68-year-old Sondra Better	Delray Beach, Florida, USA	1998-08-24	2019-03-27	Barket was charged with this case after his fingerprints were acquired after he was obliged to submit them for a background check after applying for a new job. While he admitted to being present at the store, he claimed that he had touched a marble ball in the store and that's how his DNA was found. His argument was dismissed, and he was subsequently convicted and sentenced to life imprisonment.
Terrence Miller	Rape and murder of 20-year-old Jody Loomis	Snohomish County, Washington, USA	1972-08-23	2019-04-10	This is the second arrest that Snohomish County has made as a result of their working with Parabon (the first was of William Earl Talbott II). Police were given a list of six brothers as a result of investigative genetic genealogy, but focused on Miller because he had been accused of several sex crimes as early as the 1960s and because he lived near Loomis at the time of her murder. Miller's DNA was obtained from a discarded coffee cup and matched with the DNA from semen found on Loomis hiking boot. Described as a "real predator", Miller, 77 at the time of his arrest, pleaded "not guilty". On Monday, 9 November 2020, Miller committed suicide in his home where he was out on bail, but three hours after being found deceased, he was convicted of first-degree murder by the jury. There is the possibility that the prosecution will ask the family to pay fines in the case.
Brian Leigh Dripps Sr.	Rape and murder of 18-year-old Angie Dodge	Idaho Falls, Idaho, USA	1996-06-13	2019-05-15	Christopher Tapp, who was coerced into a false confession, was convicted of Dodge's rape and murder, but was exonerated on July 17, 2019. This was the first genetic genealogy case that resulted in an exoneration. In May 2019, Dripps was identified as the prime suspect. When faced with the DNA evidence, Dripps admitted to her rape and murder, stating that he had intended to rape her, but her killing was "an accident." In 1996, Dripps lived across the street from Dodge and was even interviewed by the police shortly after her death. On August 23, 2019, Dripps was formally charged with rape and first-degree murder and on September 9, 2019, he pleaded not guilty to both charges. In June 2021, he was sentenced to life in prison.
Michael Whyte	Murder of 20-year-old US Army Specialist Darlene Krashoc	Fort Carson, Colorado, USA	1987-03-17	2019-06-13	At the time of the crime, Whyte, a soldier also stationed at Fort Carson, had been at a club when Krashoc visited with members of her unit. In June 2021, he was sentenced to life in prison with the possibility of parole after 40 years.
Ivan Keith	Serial rapes	Massachusetts, USA	1997 - 1998	2019-08-02	Keith, who had a history of sexual offences, was living in Seal Cove, Maine, at the time of his arrest. A discarded vaping pipe was used to identify him as the primary suspect. He was charged with five counts of aggravated rape, two counts of assault and battery with a dangerous weapon, two counts of kidnapping, assault with a dangerous weapon, two counts of threats to commit bodily harm, breaking and entering into a building in the night with intent to commit a felony, perjury, making false statements, and failure to register as a sex offender. He pleaded guilty on all charges, and was given a combined sentence of 44 to 50 years imprisonment.
Donald Frances McQuade	Murder of 16-year-old Shelley Connolly	Anchorage, Alaska, USA	1978	2019-09-04	McQuade was arrested in Gresham, Oregon, and charged with first and second-degree murder of Shelley Connolly. Connolly had been beaten, raped, dragged by a moving car and thrown over an embankment where she froze to death in the cold of the Alaskan winter. Parabon narrowed down suspects to three brothers using genetic genealogy and DNA taken from under Connolly's nails and on her body. Police found that one, Donald McQuade, had been living in Alaska at the time and obtained an exact DNA match with discarded cigarette butts. In April 2024, McQuade was sentenced to 50 years imprisonment.
Robert Tyrone Hayes	Serial murders of Laquetta Gunther, Julie Green, Iwana Patton and Rachel Bey	Palm Beach and Daytona Beach, Florida, USA	2005-12-26 to 2016-03-07	2019-09-15	DNA from Bey's murder scene (Palm Beach) matched DNA form a cigarette that Hayes had discarded, which was later matched to the other murders. He was found guilty and sentenced to three life terms without parole for the murders of Gunther, Green and Patton, but is yet to stand trial for the murder of Bey.
Patrick Leon Nicholas	Rape and murder of 16-year-old Sarah Yarborough	Federal Way, Washington, USA	1991-12-14	2019–10	A convicted child molester, Nicholas was identified after investigators linked DNA left behind by used cigarette butts to the crime scene. He was arrested at a dry cleaner's in Kent, and was held on $5 million bail. In May 2023, Nicholas was convicted and sentenced to 45 years imprisonment.
Jonathan D. Hurst	Murder of Patricia Wilson, 85, and her son Robert Wilson, 64	Sycamore, Illinois, USA	2016–08	2020-02-24	Since there is no known link between Hurst and the Wilson family, police have theorized that Hurst acted in a "random act of violence." Hurst was extradited from Cincinnati, Ohio, to Illinois to face two counts of first-degree murder. Hurst was convicted in January 2025.
Phillip Lee Wilson	Sexual assault and murder of 20-year-old Robin Brooks	Sacramento, California, USA	1980-04-24	2020-04-24	Wilson, a small-time criminal who had convictions for assault and drug possession in California and Texas, was linked to the crime scene through some blood left at the crime scene, possibly from accidentally cutting himself while stabbing Brooks. In April 2022, he was convicted and sentenced to life without parole.
Joseph Matthew Gregory Jones	Murder of 52-year-old Robert Romero	Santa Fe, New Mexico, USA	2018-07-30	2020-05-14	Jones had been released four days before Romero's murder after serving 18 months of supervised probation for a fourth-degree felony (receiving stolen goods). Police can make no personal link between Jones and Romero, making this a crime of opportunity. This is the first case that Parabon solved in New Mexico. DNA at the crime scene came from a pair of glasses and a flashlight and was compared to three persons of interest identified by Parabon. It was Jones's DNA that matched the DNA found at the crime scene. The execution of a search warrant for Jones's apartment revealed a handgun that may have been used to commit the crime. In February 2023, he was convicted of felony murder.
Alan Edward Dean	Sexual assault and murder of 15-year-old Melissa Lee	Bothell, Washington, USA	1993-04-14	2020-07-29	Dean's arrest is the third made by Snohomish County law enforcement as a result of working with Parabon (the first arrest made was that of William Earl Talbott II; the second, of Terrence Miller). The arrest of Dean was "uneventful," his DNA from a discarded cigarette matching the crime scene's DNA recovered from Lee's clothing. Dean reportedly knew Lee through a telephone "date line" and had been interviewed by police soon after her death. When Moore included Dean on her list of persons of interest, police quickly began surveillance because his name was in the case files. Dean has a previous arrest record that includes "marijuana possession, domestic violence assault, resisting arrest, failing to obey an officer and contributing to the delinquency of a minor." He was found guilty in March 2024 and sentenced to 26.5 years imprisonment.
Michael Allan Carbo Jr.	Sexual assault and murder of 52-year-old mother Nancy Daugherty	Chisholm, Minnesota, USA	1986-07-16	2020-07-29	In what Chisholm investigators believe is the first case in Minnesota in which a suspect has been identified through investigative genetic genealogy, Carbo was arrested the same day as a direct DNA sample tested positive as a match to the DNA left from the sexual assault kit and from Daughterty's fingernail clippings. Carbo went to school with Daugherty's children and was never on the suspect list during the 1986 investigation. In October 2022, he was convicted on two counts of first-degree murder and sentenced to life imprisonment with a chance of parole after serving 17 years.
Stephen Ray Hessler	Serial Home Invasion and Sexual Assault	Greensburg, Indiana, USA	1982–1985	2020-08-17	Hessler is a convicted felon, having served time in the 1990s for a similar crime. He faces 24 felony charges for home invasion and sexual assault of 10 victims. After Parabon provided Hessler as a person of interest as a result of investigative genetic genealogy, authorities positively identified him through a DNA sample obtained from an envelope that contained his payment for his Greensburg utility bill. He was convicted on 19 felony charges and sentenced to 650 years imprisonment in March 2022.
David Lee Blair	Murder by stabbing of 74-year-old George Washington Price	Elizabeth City, North Carolina, USA	2016-03-24	2021-01-26	The North Carolina State Bureau of Investigation (SBI) was brought in to investigate the stabbing death of Price. After all leads were dried up, they turned to Parabon in October 2020 to generate leads from DNA analysis and genetic genealogy. The Pasquotank County Sheriff's Office and SBI then focused their traditional police work on these new leads, which led to the arrest of Blair, 55, at his home in Winston-Salem. Blair has been booked without bond.
Clayton Bernard Foreman	Rape and murder of Mary Catherine Edwards	Beaumont, Texas, USA	1995-01-15	2021-04-26	The Beaumont Police Department and the Texas Rangers led the investigation, with the assistance of the Franklin County (Ohio) Sheriff's Office, the FBI and the DPS Criminal Laboratory. The Jefferson County Sheriff's Office aided the investigation. It has been confirmed that Edwards and Foreman knew each other long before the murder and that Edwards was once a bridesmaid at Foreman's wedding. Foreman had a previous sexual assault conviction in 1981 He was convicted of the murder in 2024 and was sentenced to life imprisonment with a chance of parole after 30 years.
Gustav Ryburn	Sexual assault of a Vincennes woman in her residence	Vincennes, Indiana, USA	2008-11-21	2021-04-27	At the time of the crime, Ryburn was worked at a bar in the city, and had no connection to the victim. Until his arrest, it was the city's only unsolved violent crime. In September 2022, he was convicted and sentenced to 80 years imprisonment.
Robert Arthur Plympton	Rape and murder of 19-year-old Barbara Tucker	Gresham, Oregon, USA	1980-01-15	2021-06-09	Plympton was arrested during a routine traffic stop, and his DNA was later used to link him to the crime, which was one of the city's oldest cold cases. He was convicted of the murder in March 2024 and faces a life sentence.
Bruce A. Cymanski	Kidnapping and murder of 17-year-old Nancy Noga	Sayreville, New Jersey, USA	1999-01-07	2021-08-31	Cymanski was partially identified by genetic genealogy methods used by Parabon in the case, the first in the state to result in an arrest. Found guilty in October 2024 and sentenced to life imprisonment plus 20 years.
Miguel Enrique Salguero-Olivares	Killing of Faith Hedgepeth	Chapel Hill, North Carolina, USA	2012-09-07	2021-09-16	Salguero-Olivares, who was not originally considered a suspect in the case, was linked to the case after a DNA matched, submitted from a drunk driving charge, was linked to the case. He awaits trial for her murder.
William Clark	Sexual assault of a 14-year-old girl	Fairfax, Virginia, USA	1987-03-06	2022-04-20	At the time of the crime, Clark, pretending to be radio host Don Geronimo, phoned the victim and claimed that she had won $1,000 and a trip to Hawaii, which she could collect at a local radio station. When the victim arrived, she was abducted and taken to a dirt road, where she was raped. While DNA was collected in 2005, it was not until the police contacted Parabon that a profile of the perpetrator was developed, leading to Clark's identification and subsequent arrest. He is facing several counts of rape, abduction with intent to defile and attempted forcible sodomy.
Morico Tyrone Johnson	Murder of 22-year-old Christine McWhorter and her aunt, 31-year-old Beatrice Daniels	Mount Union, Pennsylvania, USA	2009-01-03	2022-05-25	The perpetrator was identified with the help of droplets of blood located at the crime scene. At the time, Johnson, who is from Newport News, Virginia, was periodically visiting his then-girlfriend and became acquainted with McWhorter through her. He was convicted of the crime in October 2024 and sentenced to two consecutive life sentences.
Alan John Lefferts	Murder of 44-year-old James Edwin Branner	Tallahassee, Florida, USA	1996-07-02	2022-05-31	DNA left behind at the crime scene, which was later given for analysis to Parabon, led to the identification of Lefferts as the likely perpetrator. He is charged with first-degree murder.
Meaonia Michelle Allen	Murder of her newborn baby	Choctaw County, Oklahoma, USA	1993-12-08	2022-06-24	After a warrant was issued for her arrest, Allen turned herself in to authorities and confessed to slashing the newborn's throat shortly after birth. She is charged with first-degree murder and is held without bond. In March 2025, Allen was sentenced to five years in prison and 15 years suspended for unlawful removal of a dead body and felony child neglect.
Robert John Lanoue	Kidnapping and murder of 5-year-old Anne Sang Thi Pham	Seaside, California, USA	1982-01-21	2022-07-08	Following his arrest, Lanoue was extradited from his home in Reno, Nevada. He was charged with first-degree murder, kidnapping and lewd acts on a child. In February 2025, He pled guilty to the charges and was sentenced to 25 years to life plus 31 years.
Tony Lee Wagner	Assault and rape of two women	Branson, Missouri, USA	1992-08-15	2022-10-13	On the aforementioned date, two tourists from Texas were assaulted while hiking through some trails in Henning State Park. Parabon worked together with local authorities to identify Wagner as a suspect, and he was extradited from Kansas to face charges of first-degree assault, kidnapping and forcible rape. He was found guilty in March 2025.
William Lionelle Phelps IV	Serial rapes	Norfolk and Chesapeake, Virginia, USA	2008	2022-10-18	Phelps was initially arrested for an unrelated incident in August 2022, but his DNA was later linked to four rapes that dated back to 2008. He is currently held without bond.
Jeffrey Paul Premo	Murder of 19-year-old Jennifer Brinkman	Marysville, Washington, USA	1998-03-21	2022-11-30	Premo and Brinkman first got into contact via chatting on the phone, but shortly after meeting up in real life, she was bludgeoned to death with an axe in her bedroom. Premo, a suspect since the initial investigation, was finally arrested after his DNA was linked to the murder weapon. He is currently held on charges of first-degree murder and $250,000 bail.
Michael Lapniewski Jr.	Murder of 82-year-old Opal Weil	Lealman, Florida, USA	1987-02-09	2023-02-02	Lapniewski's DNA was extracted and linked to the crime after he was offered a free meal at a restaurant. He is also suspected in at least two more attacks that occurred within days of Weil's murder, one of which resulted in the death of 84-year-old Eleanor Swift.
David Edward Hollowell	Attempted murder, rape and child molestation	Charlestown, Indiana, USA	2003-04-14	2023-07-29	During the attack, Hollowell raped a 13-year-old girl and then shot her stepfather, who survived, but was left with a permanent brain injury. The identification was made through a familial DNA match collected from Hollowell's brother. In October 2024, Hollowell was found guilty of rape, child molesting and burglary.
Linford Deamorris Moore	Sexual assault of a woman in her home	Fayetteville, North Carolina, USA	1997–10	2023-09-13	Morris was charged with first-degree rape, first-degree kidnapping and felony breaking and entering with relation to the incident, and is currently held on $250,000 bail.
Elias Diaz	Rape and murder of 30-year-old Rebecca Park, and two rapes as the "Fairmount Park Rapist"	Philadelphia, Pennsylvania, USA	2003 – 2007	2023-12-19	Diaz was initially arrested for two slashing attacks committed in November 2023, and was linked to the Fairmount Park Rapist crimes via a DNA match.
Annie Anderson	Murder of "Baby Skylar"	Phoenix, Arizona, USA	2005-10-10	2024-02-20	Anderson was arrested at her residence in Washington State and allegedly admitted that she was the newborn's mother. She is waiting extradition to Arizona, where she faces first-degree murder charges.
Elroy Neal Harrison	Murder of 32-year-old Jacqueline Lard	Stafford County, Virginia, USA	1986-11-14	2024-03-06	Harrison, 65, was arrested at his home in Stafford County after DNA linked him to Lard's murder, as well as the 1989 murder of 18-year-old Amy Baker in Fairfax County. He was found guilty of Lards murder in 2025. He was sentenced to 3 life sentences plus 40 years.
Jamie Dodge	Sexual assault	Holland, Massachusetts, USA	2000-07-23	2024-05-09	Dodge, 48, was arraigned on kidnapping and aggravated rape charges after Parabon matched his DNA to the crime scene. He was convicted of the charges and sentenced to 12-to-15 years imprisonment in August 2025.
Stephen Paul Gale	Sexual assault of two women	Framingham, Massachusetts, USA	1989-12-27	2024-08-08	Gale, 71, is alleged to have assaulted two female store employees at gunpoint. Authorities say that he has ties to organized crime, uses multiple aliases and has previously lived in Los Angeles and Las Vegas. He surrendered to police in Los Angeles, California on August 8, 2024, after a lengthy car chase with police.
Dana Jermaine Shepherd	Murder of his 19-year-old neighbor Carmen Van Huss	Indianapolis, Indiana, USA	1993-03-24	2024-09-02	At the time of his arrest, Shepherd was living in Missouri and is currently awaiting extradition back to Indiana.
Gregory Thurson	Murder of 51-year-old John Blaylock	Crown Point, Indiana, USA	1981-11-03	2024-10-29	At the time of his arrest, Thurson was living in Eugene, Oregon. He is now awaiting charges in the case.
Michael S. Schappert	Murder of 24-year-old Ronald Lee Novak	Walker, Iowa, USA	1983-12-24	2025-05-30	DNA found on Novak's clothing and a hammer used in his murder was linked back to Schappert. He is currently detained in Oregon and awaiting extradition to Iowa.
Larry Franklin Tucker Jr.	Sexual assault of a 65-year-old woman	Tavares, Florida, USA	2007-10-22	2025-10-09	Tucker was identified as a person of interest in 2018, after his DNA profile was found to be a match for the suspect. He was later arrested at his home in Ohio and extradited to Florida, where he now awaits official charges.
Cortez Sabino Lake	Sexual assault and murder of 37-year-old Margit Schuller	Burton, South Carolina, USA	1987-11-01	2025-11-25	Lake, who was Schuller's neighbor at the time of the murder, was charged after his DNA was collected during an interview. When it was found to be a match, he was arrested for her murder and is now awaiting trial.
David James Zimbrick	Sexual assault of two children	Lawrence, Kansas, USA	2000-08 and 2003–05	2025-12-30	Zimbrick's identification was delayed due to the fact that he was adopted. After investigators found his birth mother and obtained the necessary sample from him, he was arrested and charged with rape and aggravated sodomy.

==== Case results: Confessions and guilty pleas ====
In the following cases, the suspect arrested for the offense subsequently confessed and was sentenced without going to trial.

Confessor	Offense(s) and victim(s)	Location of offense(s)	Offense date(s)	Arrested	Sentencing
José Silvano Alvarez Jr.	Murders of 48-year-old Douglas "Troy" and 45-year-old LaDonna French	Wentworth, North Carolina, USA	2012-02-04	2015-07-25	Alvarez was linked to the crime after his brother, John, was positively ruled out as a suspect following a DNA analysis. José and his father were later swabbed, with the subsequent samples proving that not only José Jr. was the killer, but also that José Sr. was not his biological father, the reason why the Y-STRs did not match. Alvarez later pled guilty to the crimes, and was sentenced to two life terms without parole.
Shawn J. Lawson Jr.	Serial rapes	Athens and Lancaster, Ohio, USA	2006–06 to 2016–06	2017-05-08	Admitted to three rapes and sexual assaults committed over a decade, beginning when he was 15. For these crimes, Lawson was sentenced to 40 years imprisonment.
Justin Hansen	Attempted murder of 17-year-old Brittani Marcell	Albuquerque, New Mexico, USA	2008-10-11	2017-07-05	Hansen, an acquaintance of Marcell's who had visited her on several occasions prior to the attack, pleaded no contest to the charges and was sentenced to 18 years. In 2021, 371 days were removed off his sentence as time served.
Gary E. Schara	Kidnapping and murder of 24-year-old teacher Lisa Ziegert	Agawam, Massachusetts, USA	1992-04-15	2017-09-16	A suspect in the case since 1993, Schara's arrest came about when he tried to flee from authorities who had come to take a DNA sample, leaving a note at his girlfriend's house in which he confessed to kidnapping and killing Ziegert. He was arrested in Connecticut, and after initially pleading not guilty, he changed his plea to guilty and was summarily sentenced to life imprisonment without parole.
Ryan Derek Riggs	Rape and murder of 25-year-old Rhonda "Chantay" Blankinship	Lake Brownwood, Texas, USA	2016-05-13	2017-11-15	Admitted to the murder during a church service, later accepting a plea deal to avoid capital murder charges. Subsequently, he was sentenced to life imprisonment without parole.
Robert D. Washburn	Rape and murder of 13-year-old Jennifer Bastian	Tacoma, Washington, USA	1986-08-04	2018-05-12	Washburn was arrested at his home in Eureka, Illinois, after DNA left at the crime was matched to him. At his trial in January 2019, he admitted to the murder and was sentenced to 27 years imprisonment. In 2019 Washington state passed "Jennifer and Michella's law" named after Michella Welch (see above) and Jennifer Bastian. This law allowed police more latitude in taking DNA samples from convicted sex offenders.
Raymond Charles Rowe	Sexual assault and murder of 25-year-old schoolteacher Christy Mirack	East Lampeter Township, Pennsylvania, USA	1992-12-21	2018-06-26	Admitted to murder and was sentenced to life without parole.
John Dale Miller	Rape and murder of 8-year-old April M. Tinsley	Fort Wayne, Indiana, USA	1988-04-04	2018-07-15	Miller confessed and was sentenced to 80 years.
Spencer Glen Monnett	Rape, burglary and assault of 79-year-old Carla Brooks	St. George, Utah, USA	2018-04-17	2018-07-27	Normally, the names of rape victims are not released, but Ms. Brooks gave permission because she wanted to raise awareness about sexual assault. Monnett wrote a full confession and an apology letter. Ms. Brooks forgave him. Monnett was charged with rape and burglary and sentenced to a five-year-to-life term.
James Edward Papol	Rape and murder of 24-year-old Mary Lynn Vialpando	Colorado Springs, Colorado, USA	1988-06-05	2018-09-20	At the time of the crime, Papol was only 15 years old. He pleaded guilty to second-degree murder and was sentenced to 60 years imprisonment, after several delays to his trial.
Unidentified 17-year-old Juvenile Offender	Aggravated assault of 71-year-old organist Margaret Orlando	Salt Lake City, Utah, USA	2018-11-17	2019-04-24 (announced)	This was the first use of GEDMatch for a crime other than rape or murder and was CeCe Moore's first active case. This case also brought on the change in GEDMatch's Terms of Service, expanding the crimes for which the database could be used by law enforcement. GEDMatch removed all profiles from law enforcement's access and introduced the requirement for members to "opt-in" to allow law enforcement's access. The juvenile offender confessed and was sent to youth lockup. Ms. Orlando forgave him at his sentencing for aggravated assault and aggravated burglary.
Marquise D. Dozier	Multiple rapes	Allen County, Indiana, USA	2015 - 2017	2019–03	Dozier pleaded guilty to three counts of rape as part of a plea agreement. Because of his guilty plea, he was sentenced to 55 years and three additional rape counts and charges of burglary and battery with a deadly weapon were dismissed.
Frederick Lee Frampton Jr.	Armed robbery and subsequent death of 24-year-old Michael Anthony Temple Jr.	Odenton, Maryland, USA	2010-02-02	2018-11-01	Temple was left a quadriplegic after the robbery and shooting, and subsequently died June 18, 2015, as a result of the 2010 attack. The robbery and murder were committed by two men, but the second suspect, Jonathan Ludwig, had died in March 2018. Charges against Frampton included first-degree murder, second-degree murder, and armed robbery. In September 2019, Frampton pleaded guilty to first-degree murder and was sentenced to life in prison, with the judge suspending all but 55 years.
Zachary Aaron Bunney	Murder of 47-year-old Scott Martinez	La Mesa, California, USA	2006-06-17	2019-01-10	Martinez was stabbed several times with a sword in his home. The suspect left two blood stains, most likely the result of cutting himself while killing Martinez. Police traveled to Oregon to obtain an oral swab of Bunney's DNA, which proved to be a match to the crime-scene DNA. He pleaded guilty and was sentenced to 12 years in prison.
Jesse Bjerke	Rape of a 24-year-old female lifeguard at gunpoint	Alexandria, Virginia, USA	2016–09	2019–02	On 17 October 2019, Bjerke pleaded guilty to all six charges against him. In return for his guilty plea, he would not be sentenced to a life term. He was identified through genetic genealogy and then confirmed as a match after his DNA was obtained from a discarded drinking straw. On 2 October 2020, Bjerke was sentenced to 65 years for this and a second rape that occurred in Fairfax County in August 2014.
Johnnie B. Green Jr.	Multiple rapes, kidnappings, robberies	Fayetteville, North Carolina, USA	2009 - 2010	2019-05-07	Green was linked to multiple cold-case rapes and was charged with seven counts of first-degree burglary, two counts of felonious breaking and entering, 14 counts of second-degree rape, 21 counts of second-degree sex offense, five counts of first-degree kidnapping, and seven counts of common law robbery. On September 12, 2022, Green pled guilty to nine counts of rape, 15 counts of second-degree sex offense, seven counts of burglary, three counts of breaking and entering, four counts of kidnapping, six counts of common law robbery, and one count of attempted common-law robbery and was sentenced to 23 to 28 years and 4 months in prison.
Dennis Lee Bowman	Rape and murder of 25-year-old Kathleen Doyle	Norfolk, Virginia, USA	1980-09-11	2019–11	At the time of the crime, Bowman was a Navy Reserve officer serving aboard the USS Piedmont. After being contacted by authorities in Norfolk, Parabon developed a snapshot and later a list of 30 potential suspect, amongst whom was Bowman. His DNA later proved to be a match to the case, he was arrested and later pleaded guilty to Doyle's murder, receiving two life sentences. He has also pleaded guilty to the 1989 murder of his stepdaughter Aundria Bowman in Michigan, On February 7, 2022, he was sentenced to 35–50 years in prison.
James Curtis Clanton, formerly known as Curtis Allen White	Murder of 21-year-old Helene Pruszynski	Douglas County, Colorado, USA	1980-01-16	2019–12	At the time of Pruszynski's murder, Clanton was on parole for rape in Arkansas after serving about four years. His DNA was not in CODIS, however. Charges include felony murder predicated on an underlying crime of robbery and felony murder predicated on an underlying crime of sexual assault. Clanton was positively identified after genetic genealogy led police to him. They put him under surveillance and were successful in obtaining a beer mug that Clanton had used at a bar. Police are investigating if Clanton was responsible for other sexual assaults in the area at the time of Pruszynski's murder. In February 2020, Clanton pleaded guilty to first degree murder and was sentenced to life imprisonment with the possibility of parole after 20 years.
Michael Wayne DeVaughn	'Labor Day Murder' of 65-year-old Betty Jones	Starkville, Mississippi, USA	1990-09-03	2018-10-06	DeVaughn was charged with the murder of Betty Jones and the sexual battery of 81-year-old Kathryn Crigler, Jones's wheelchair-using housemate. Crigler died two months after the attack, but DeVaughn was not charged with her murder. He was held in a Mississippi jail on a $11 million bond until his court date. On 17 November 2020, DeVaughn pleaded guilty to capital murder and was sentenced to life in prison without parole. For pleading guilty, DeVaughn was not charged with the sexual battery of Crigler.
Jeffrey King	Rape of a 22-year-old female	Newark, Delaware, USA	1993-08-04	2019-10-03	Parabon produced both trait predictions and leads derived from genetic genealogy for the Newark Police Department to use to focus their investigation. King, a 54-year-old man from Coatesville, Pennsylvania, was 28 at the time of the crime. This case is the result of an initiative to test previously untested sexual assault kits in Delaware. In October 2022, King pled guilty and was sentenced to 10 years in prison.
Shane Boice	Rape of a Belle Fourche female in her residence	Belle Fourche, South Dakota, USA	2012-04-12	2019-01-02	Two counts of burglary were dropped (Boice had broken into the victim's residence through a window) as part of the plea deal that was arranged in September 2020. On 17 February 2021, his guilty plea to second-degree rape resulted in a sentence of 45 years.
Mason Alexander Hall	Rape of a woman in Norristown Farm Park	Norristown, Pennsylvania, USA	2017–08	2019-10-18	Pleaded guilty to the crime and was sentenced to 13-to-32 years imprisonment, taking into account the aggravating circumstances of his offence. In addition, Hall will be put on probation for three further years.
David Lee Williams	First-degree rape	Gaithersburg, Maryland, USA	2017-10-06	2019-08-04	Williams was additionally connected to an attempted burglary in the area that had occurred the previous month. On October 20, 2021, Williams was sentenced to 45 years imprisonment after pleading guilty to the crime, and is required to register as a sex offender following his release.
Nickey Duane Stane	Murder of Debbie Dorian and multiple rapes	Fresno and Visalia, California, USA	1996-early 2000s	2019-10-05	
Joseph Clinton Mills	Murder and sexual assault of 31-year-old mother Linda Patterson Slaten	Lakeland, Florida, USA	1981-09-03	2019-12-12	Slaten's young sons were asleep when their mother was assaulted and murdered. Genetic genealogy led to Mills as the most likely suspect. Police matched Mills's DNA from his trash to the DNA from the sexual assault. In February 2022, he pleaded guilty to the crime and was sentenced to four life terms without parole.
Darold Wayne Bowden	Serial rapes as the "Ramsey Street Rapist"	Fayetteville, North Carolina, USA	2006-08-23	2018-08-18	August 23, 2006, is the date of the first offense of record. Multiple rapes attributed to the "Ramsey Street Rapist" occurred into 2018. He pleaded guilty to the crimes and was sentenced to 25 years imprisonment without parole.
William Blankenship	Rape of at least three victims (two were children)	Cincinnati, Ohio, USA	1999 and 2001	2020-02-11	Blankenship was indicted on three counts of rape, two of which were against young girls aged 10 and 15. Police in Hamilton County are actively investigating the possibility that Blankenship has committed similar crimes in the area, including in Kansas. Pled guilty to the charges and sentenced to 19 years in prison.
Angela Renee Siebke	Murder by asphyxiation of her newborn girl who was given the name "Baby April" at burial	Moline, Illinois, USA	1992-04-11	2020-12-17	"Baby April" was found along the shore of the Mississippi River by a man walking his dog. Many detectives worked the case, but all tips investigated did not lead to an arrest. In 2014, the police charged the DNA profile with first-degree murder. This was the first time that Rock Island County prosecutors filed a charge against a DNA profile. In 2019, Parabon was brought on board to generate leads based the results of a genetic genealogy investigation. A search warrant for Siebke's DNA was issued 1 December 2020, and based on the results, Siebke, who was living in Ohio, was arrested on 17 December 2020. She later pleaded guilty to the murder, and in February 2022, she was sentenced to a 2-year prison sentence with time served, and is expected to be released on furlough.
Adam Antonio Spencer Durborow	Aggravated murder of 64-year-old Sherry Black	Salt Lake County, Utah, USA	2010-11-30	2020-10-10	Black was found deceased in B&W Billiards and Books, a store that she owned. The processing of the crime scene yielded DNA evidence with which Parabon created a Snapshot and performed familial research. Police collected Durborow's DNA surreptitiously and his DNA profile matched that from the crime scene. After his arrest and post-Miranda, Durborow pleaded guilty to the crime in October 2021, and was subsequently sentenced to life imprisonment without parole in February 2022.
Martin Isaac Tellez	Robbery and murder of 42-year-old Subir Chatterjee	Oak Ridge North, Texas, USA	2002-02-15	2019-12-10	After investigating the case for several years, detectives working on the case managed to obtain items that contained Tellez's DNA and submitted it to Parabon, whose technology confirmed that the killer's DNA was a match to his. Tellez was soon after arrested and placed on $500,000 bond, but on April 9, 2021, he removed his ankle monitor and attempted to flee to Mexico, but was reapprehended before he could do so. He pleaded guilty to the crime in June 2022 and was subsequently sentenced to 60 years imprisonment.
Lloyd Wendell Ailes	Sexual assault of a Miami University student	Oxford, Ohio, USA	2006-09-01	2021-12-09	Ailes' DNA was collected from an unrelated attack in Fayette County, Indiana, which was later used to trace his father and eventually single him out of as a suspect. He pleaded guilty on six felony counts and was sentenced to 17 years imprisonment, and has to register as a sex offender when he's released.
Jennifer Lynn Matter	Murder of two newborn babies on separate occasions	Red Wing and Frontenac, Minnesota, USA	1999 and 2003	2022-05-09	Matter was linked via DNA evidence to both children, named "Jamie" and "Cory", respectively. In January 2023, she pleaded guilty to one count of second-degree murder - in exchange, prosecutors dropped the second count and the aggravated murder enhancement. As a result, Matter was given 27 years imprisonment.
Lionel Jarvon Wells	Serial rapes	Detroit, Michigan, USA	2007 – 2014	2022-09-14	Wells was arrested for rape, kidnapping and armed robbery on July 26, 2021, after his DNA was matched to CODIS. He pleaded guilty to on all charges, and was subsequently sentenced to serve 25-to-50 years imprisonment. He is also required to register as a sex offender and will be monitored after release.
Nina Albright	Death of her newborn baby	Calgary, Alberta, Canada	2017-12-24	2020-01-23	Albright was identified with the help of DNA and additional security footage showing her and an unidentified male around the time the infant is supposed to have been born. She pleaded guilty and given a suspended sentence.
John Getreu	Murder by strangulation of 21-year-old Stanford University graduate Leslie Marie Perlov	Santa Clara, California, USA	1973-02-13	2018-11-20	Police said Getreu's DNA was a match with the DNA of Perlov's killer. He has a criminal record, including rape and murder done while he was a juvenile. Police are reaching out to other jurisdictions to determine if Getreu could be responsible for other unsolved rapes and murders during this time period. In January 2023, he pleaded guilty to the Perlov murder and was sentenced to life imprisonment without parole. Getreu died behind bars in September 2023.
Arya Singh	Death of her newborn baby	Boynton Beach, Florida, USA	2018-06-01	2022-12-15	The baby was found floating in the Boynton Inlet. Using a DNA sample analyzed by Parabon NanoLabs, a forensic scientist supervisor investigating the case was able to track the baby's father, who indicated that he had previously dated Arya Singh. When confronted, she confessed to giving birth to the baby and almost immediately disposing of it. She pleaded guilty to aggravated manslaughter and abuse of a corpse in August 2023, and was sentenced to 14 years imprisonment.
David Vincent Sinopoli	Murder of 19-year-old Lindy Sue Biechler	Manor Township, Pennsylvania, USA	1975-12-05	2022-07-17	After being identified as a potential suspect, Sinopoli's DNA was obtained via a discarded coffee cup he threw into a trash can. The resulting tests linked him to the murder and his subsequent arrest. He pleaded guilty to third-degree murder in October 2023 and was sentenced to 25-to-50 years imprisonment.
Jerry Lee	Fatal shooting of 28-year-old Lorrie Ann Smith	Fulton County, Georgia, USA	1997-05-25	2018–10	Lee, 61, was arrested in Alabama and brought back to Georgia. His DNA matched the DNA from blood left at the scene. He pleaded guilty in November 2023 and was sentenced to 18 years imprisonment.
Douglas Larry Weber	Sexual assault of a hitchhiker	Larkin Charter Township, Michigan, USA	1996-01-07	2022-11-03	The identification was made by identifying potential relatives of the perpetrator, leading investigators to Weber. He pleaded guilty to third-degree criminal sexual assault and was sentenced to 5-to-15 years imprisonment.
Aryan Vito Smith	Fatal stabbing of 26-year-old Treeanna Nichols	Westminster, California, USA	2018-02-05	2020–05	Smith was arrested after Parabon matched DNA found at the crime scene back to him, as he had no previous criminal record. In March 2024, he pleaded guilty to the murder and now awaits sentencing.
Antoinette Briley	Murder by asphyxiation of her newborn twin sons	Stickney Township, Illinois, USA	2003-06-06	2020-12-03	The bodies of the newborns were discovered in a garbage truck's front bucket by the driver. Briley was identified as the mother based on a lead generated by Parabon's genetic genealogy specialists. A comparison of Briley's DNA from discarded items in Michigan identified her as the infants' mother. After her arrest, Briley admitted to her involvement in the murders of her two infant sons and later pleaded guilty, receiving a sentence of 20 years imprisonment.
Christopher Aldrich	Sexual assault of a 28-year-old woman	Acton, Massachusetts, USA	2013-06-12	2023-02-22	Aldrich was linked to the crime after his DNA was obtained in an unrelated incident involving a drunk driving incident. He pleaded guilty to the crime in October 2024 and was sentenced to 15 years imprisonment.
Kurt Alan Rillema	Two sexual assaults	Oakland Charter Township, Michigan and State College, Pennsylvania, USA	1999 and 2000, respectively	2023-04-18	Rillema, an avid golfer, committed the sexual assaults at knifepoint near golf courses. He pleaded no contest to the Michigan charge and was sentenced to 10-to-15 years imprisonment; he is yet to be tried for the Pennsylvania charge.
Stephen Smerk	Murder of 37-year-old Robin Warr Lawrence	West Springfield, Virginia, USA	1994-11-20	2023-09-12	At the time of the crime, Smerk was an active-duty serviceman. He was arrested at his home in Niskayuna, New York, charged with second-degree murder and subsequently confessed. In March 2025, he was sentenced to 70 years imprisonment.

Case results: Dismissals

In the following cases, the suspect arrested for the offense was either released or found not guilty in a court of law. Many factors may result in such an outcome, ranging from the prosecution dropping all charges, acquittals, dismissals, etc.

Arrestee	Offense(s) and victim(s)	Location of offense(s)	Offense date(s)	Arrested	Case outcome
Richard Eugene Knapp	Rape and murder of Audray Hoellein Frasier	Vancouver, Washington, USA	1994-07-17	2019-05-28	Knapp, who had been convicted of sexual assault in 1986, was arrested as a suspect in Frasier's murder after his DNA was found on her body. However, prosecutors dropped all charges against him after another suspect, Scott Hinshaw, admitted to having sex with the victim on the night of her death. It is unclear if Knapp will face other charges related to this case in the future.
James Randy Byrd	Armed kidnapping and sexual battery on a 22-year-old woman	Tampa, Florida, USA	1998-03-08	2020-02-09	In a partnership with Florida Department of Law Enforcement (FDLE), Parabon's genetic genealogy unit provided the lead in September 2020 that led to the surveillance and procurement of a discarded cigarette butt in November. The match and arrest came in December. Byrd had been arrested for a similar attack in that same month, March in 1998, but the case was not pursued due to the lack of cooperation of the victim. Byrd's DNA has been linked to two other sexual assault cases in 1999, but he has not yet been formally charged for those crimes. Byrd stood trial for this case in December 2021, and was acquitted by jury verdict.
Leroy Jamal Smith	Serial rape (at least five cases)	Muskogee County, Oklahoma, USA	1993–1995	2020-06-09	Five cases have been positively linked to Smith, and Muskogee Police were asking for any other assault victims to come forward to determine if Smith was their assailant. However, all charges would later be dismissed due to the statute of limitations having passed and issues with jurisdiction, resulting in Smith's release.
Unnamed woman	Murder of 36-year-old Marie Johansson	Gothenburg, Sweden	2005-10-13	N/A	The suspect, a Swedish national who was 17 at the time of the murder, was positively linked to the murder via DNA. However, she cannot be arrested because the statute of limitations has passed.
Unnamed woman	Death of newborn "Matthew Isaac Doe"	Northfield, Vermont, USA	1982-04-01	N/A	The woman claimed that she had given birth to the child with its umbilical cord wrapped around his neck, leading to a premature death. State police ruled that homicide charges were not warranted, and since the unauthoritized disposal of a body charge was beyond the statute of limitations, the case was dropped altogether.

==== Case results: Identification of deceased primary suspects ====
In these cases, the offender was identified, but died without ever being brought to justice. Although the percentage accuracy in the identification of these primary suspects is extremely high, the cases remain open because there can be no convictions.

Suspect	Victim(s)	Location of offense(s)	Offense date(s)	Offender death	Details
Blake Anthony Russell	Murder of 19-year-old Sierra Bouzigard	Moss Bluff, Louisiana, USA	2009-11-23	2018-06-21	Russell was identified after investigator Monica Quaal contacted Parabon to help with the case. He was indicted on murder charges and was due to stand trial for the murder in September 2018, but hanged himself in the correctional center before that could happen.
James Otto Earhart	Murder of 40-year-old realtor Virginia Freeman	College Station, Texas, USA	1981–12–1	1999-08-11	Earhart was identified on June 26, 2018, but had already been executed by lethal injection in 1999 for another murder.
Robert Eugene Brashers	Murder of 28-year-old computer analyst Genevieve Zitricki	Greenville, South Carolina, USA	1990–04	1999-01-13	"Zitricki's death is believed to be one of the first attacks in a series of murders and assaults Brashers committed on women and children across four states, according to Greenville police."
Edward Keith Renegar	Kidnap, rape and murder of 32-year-old Pamela Faye Felkins	Greenbrier, Arkansas, USA	1990-02-02	2002-09-05	Renegar was identified "with 99.99% accuracy" on October 29, 2018, as the primary suspect. His biological daughter's DNA was used to confirm the results.
Jonathan Matthew Ludwig	Armed robbery and subsequent death of 24-year-old Michael Anthony Temple Jr.	Odenton, Maryland, USA	2010-02-02	2018-03-20	Temple was left a quadriplegic after the robbery and shooting, and subsequently died June 18, 2015, as a result of the 2010 attack. The robbery and murder were committed by two men, but the second suspect, Jonathan Ludwig, had died in March 2018.
David Aaron Marbrito	The killing of 39-year-old Jodine Serrin	Carlsbad, California, USA	2007-02-14	2011-01-30	Parabon's Snapshot technology helped police narrow down their list of suspects, but it was forensic genealogy pioneer Barbara Rae-Venter who performed the genealogical investigation.
William Louis Nichols	Violent rape of a 12-year-old girl	Hernando County, Florida, USA	1983	1998-10-23	Nichols had previous rape charges from 1958 to 1972. Police made the announcement of his identification in January 2019.
Jerry Walter McFadden	Rape and murder of 20-year-old Anna Marie Hlavka	Portland, Oregon, USA	1979-07-24	1999-10-14	McFadden had already been executed in 1999 in Texas for another murder. DNA from McFadden's family confirmed the identification.
Joseph Stephen Holt	Sexual aggression and murder of 27-year-old Brynn Rainey and 16-year-old Carol Andersen	South Lake Tahoe, California, USA	1977 and 1979, respectively	2014-04-06	The El Dorado County District Attorney's Office has released several photos from various time frames of Holt, hoping that someone will recognize him and come forward with information possibly connecting him with other crimes.
Kenneth Earl Day	Rape and murder of 42-year-old Le Bich-Thuy	Rockville, West Virginia, USA	1994-10-03	2017-03-24	Day was also identified as the person who raped a 53-year-old woman on June 25, 1989. DNA taken at Day's autopsy confirmed the match. The Cold Case Section have released former addresses and multiple photographs of Day to determine if he is responsible for other crimes.
Cecil Stan Caldwell	Murder of 24-year-old Clifford Bernhardt and the sexual assault and murder of his wife 24-year-old Linda Bernhardt	Billings, Montana, USA	1973-11-06	2003-12-13	Caldwell was a former co-worker of Linda Bernhardt and had no criminal record. Initially, genetic genealogy pointed to Caldwell and his brother as persons of interest. His brother voluntarily provided his DNA and was subsequently eliminated. In March 2019, Caldwell was identified as the primary suspect.
Jeffrey Lynn Hand	Murder of 19-year-old Pamela Milam	Terre Haute, Indiana, USA	1972-09-16	1978-01-24	The announcement of Hand's identification, confirmed through the DNA testing of his two sons, was made in May 2019. He had a long criminal history, including homicide, stalking, and kidnapping. He was killed by police during a botched kidnapping.
Frank Edward Wypych	Murder and sexual assault of 20-year-old Susan Galvin	Seattle, Washington, USA	1967-07-10	1987-04-07	Wypych's body was exhumed and his DNA extracted to verify the identification, which was announced on May 7, 2019. This is one the oldest cold cases (51.6 years) to be solved using genetic genealogy to-date.
Eugene Carroll Field	Rape and murder of 60-year-old Gwen Miller	Rapid City, South Dakota, USA	1968-02-29	2009-06-18	Field, who had rented a room near boarding Miller's at the time of the murder, was identified as the killer via a DNA sample provided by his brother in June 2019.
Donald Steven Perea	Rape and murder of 18-year-old Jeannie Moore	Jefferson County, Colorado, USA	1981-08-25	2012-05-28	At the time of the murder, Perea had been accused of kidapping and raping a woman in Westminster, for which he was later convicted and served time in prison between 1982 and 1985. Reverse paternity testing was used to trace and identify Perea as the killer in September 2019.
Jake Edward Brown	Rape and murder of 11-year-old Terri Lynn Hollis	Ventura County, California, USA	1972-11-23	2003-05-27	On Wednesday, September 11, 2019, Jake Edward Brown was identified as the primary suspect in the rape and murder of Terri Lynn Hollis on Thanksgiving Day in 1972. Brown's body was exhumed and DNA was extracted from his bones. It was "a 1 in 20 septillion match." Police are using the DNA profile to determine if Brown was involved in other unsolved crimes.
Philip John Cross	Murder of Traci Hammerberg	Saukville, Wisconsin, USA	1984-12-15	2012-08-21	Cross would have been 21 years old at the time of Traci's death and was working the graveyard shift at Rexnord Plastics in 1984, according to the Ozaukee County Sheriff's Office. Authorities suspect that Traci, who was known to take rides when offered, was picked up by Cross after he left his work shift the night she was killed.
Curtis Edward Blair Sr.	Brutal stabbing murder of 15-year-old Reesa Trexler	Salisbury, North Carolina, USA	1985-06-15	2004-08-06	Salisbury Police held a press conference on Tuesday, December 3, 2019, to announce that they have reached a conclusion on the brutal stabbing murder of teen Reesa Trexler. DNA collected from semen left in Trexler's body was analyzed by Parabon to produce both an ethnicity profile as well as a family tree through genetic genealogy. After the suspect was identified, Curtis's body was exhumed to obtain his DNA in order to confirm the identification. Curtis, who was in his 40s at the time of the crime has a criminal record. They declared the case "solved and now closed" and fully exonerated her sister, Jodi Trexler Laird, who had long been suspected of her sister's murder.
James Francis McNichols	Rape and murder of 11-year-old Julie Fuller	Fort Worth, Texas, USA	1983-06-27	2004-01-28	In early December 2019, Fort Worth police announced that they had positively identified McNichols as the man who raped and murdered Julie Fuller as she was taking out the trash at the Kensington Motor Lodge and Apartments. This was the first case in which Fort Worth police used genetic genealogy and they are reviewing other cases in which DNA evidence could be analyzed in the same manner to identify the offenders.
Clifton Hudspeth	Murder of 16-year-old cousins Jeffrey Flores Atup and Mary Jane Malatag	Milpitas, California, USA	1982-12-20	1999-10-07	Hudspeth had a history of criminal activity, including bank robberies, sexual assaults and at least one attempted homicide. He was identified by CeCe Moore and his body was exhumed to confirm the identification. Police are asking for help from the public to determine if Hudspeth is responsible for other offenses in Arkansas and San Diego, California, places where he had been known to live.
Bruce Everitt Lindahl	Sexual assault and murder of 16-year-old Pamela Maurer	DuPage County, Illinois, USA	1976-01-12	1981-04-04	It was announced during a press conference on January 13, 2020, that the late Bruce Lindahl was identified as the murderer of high school student Pamela Maurer. Lindahl died from "apparent accidental, self-inflicted injuries he sustained in the 1981 stabbing murder of Charles Huber, 18, of Naperville." His body was exhumed to make the positive identification. Investigators have "evidence possibly connecting Lindahl to crimes against other women between approximately 1974 and the time of his death in April of 1981."
Wesley Roy Backman	Murder of 25-year-old Tangie Sims	Aurora, Colorado, USA	1996-10-24	2008-11-17	"Aurora police on Wednesday announced that Wesley Backman, a truck driver who died in 2008 at the age of 53, was identified as the suspect through advancements in DNA testing, genealogical research, a relatively new technique for investigators that uses ancestry databases to identify relatives of suspected killers."
Lorinzo Novoa Williams	Three counts of rape	Cobb County, Georgia, USA	1999–06 to 1999–10	2019-12-11	Williams was identified using genetic genealogy. He was first approached and interviewed by police who traveled to Arkansas where he lived. The suspect denied committing the sexual assaults, but just days after the interview, the suspect went missing and was then found dead (unspecified cause of death). Subsequent DNA testing on the suspect's remains confirmed matches to the DNA evidence from the three rapes. Williams had a criminal record, including peeping tom, indecent exposure and burglary.
Hans Alejandro Huitz	Murder of 57-year-old storeowner James Essel	Comus, Maryland, USA	1992-03-22	2020-02-12	Huitz was identified as the prime suspect after blood samples left by the perpetrator at the crime scene were matched to him. On February 12, 2020, a U.S. Marshals task force attempted to take him into custody at his home in Virginia Beach, Virginia, but Huitz drew a handgun, alternating between threatening to shoot himself or one of the marshals. Eventually, Huitz was shot and killed on the spot, in what was later declared by a judge as a justifiable homicide.
Robert Dale Edwards	Murder of 57-year-old Naomi Sanders	Vallejo, California, USA	1973-02-27	1993-12-31	Edwards' father was a co-worker of Sanders. At the time of the crime, Edwards was 21 years old. Parabon identified two possible suspects: one living and one deceased. The living lead was eliminated. Because the second lead, Edwards, had been deceased and cremated, investigators made a positive identification through his son's DNA.
Clayton Carl Giese	Rape and stabbing death of 12-year-old Marsi Belecz	Spokane, Washington, USA	1985-08-04	1989-01-29	Giese's family assisted the investigation by authorizing the exhumation of his body to positively identify him. He was 21 years old at the time of the murder of Belecz and died in a car accident about four years after. Belecz's sister "found comfort in knowing Giese can no longer hurt [anyone], but sent her regards to Giese's family, because she said she knows what it is like to lose someone so young."
Daniel Leonard Wells	Sexual battery and murder of 23-year-old Tonya Ethridge McKinley	Pensacola, Florida, USA	1985-01-01	2020-04-01	Daniel Leonard Wells, 57, was facing charges of first-degree murder and first-degree sexual battery. Several items of evidence led investigators to determine that they were looking for only one suspect, whom Parabon and investigators ultimately identified as Wells. Police obtained one of Wells's discarded cigarettes to test his DNA for a match. "According to the arrest report, there is a less than 1 in 700 billion chance that the DNA from the crime scene is a match to anyone other than Wells." He was arrested on March 18, 2020, and was awaiting his first hearing that was scheduled for April 8, 2020. While in his jail cell, Wells hanged himself, not giving McKinley's family the answers they had hoped for. McKinley's son stated, "It's frustrating for our family on a lot of levels because we waited so long to get justice. Now, it seems like we just have a lot more unanswered questions."
Vernon Parker	Murder of 17-year-old Mary London	Sacramento, California, USA	1981-01-14	1982-08-23	The Sacramento Police Department said Parker was murdered in 1982, just over a year after London was slain.
Daniel Alan Anderson	Murder and dismemberment of 15-year-old John A. Muncy	Columbus, Ohio, USA	1983-10-15	2013-08-29	Although Muncy's remains were found on the western edge of Delaware County, police believed the teenager had been slain in Columbus and then dumped. Anderson and two of his brothers were first identified as persons of interest. Working with the Ohio Bureau of Criminal Identification and Investigation, detectives ultimately positively identified the deceased Anderson as the murderer. Anderson had a violent criminal past involving boys, according to Sheriff Russell Martin.
Steve Allen Branch	Rape and murder of 17-year-old Jessica Baggen	Sitka, Alaska, USA	1996-05-04	2020-08-03	Branch was living in Arkansas at the time he was identified as a primary suspect through investigative genetic genealogy. Arkansas police attempted to get a voluntary DNA sample from him, but he refused, denying any involvement with the crime. About 30 minutes after the interview, Branch committed suicide. After obtaining a warrant, police tested a DNA sample from Branch's autopsy and it proved to be a match with the DNA from the crime scene.
Jimmie Dean Duncan	Sexual assault and murder of 19-year-old Deborah Tomlinson	Grand Junction, Colorado, USA	1975-12-27	1987-12-24	Duncan, who died in 1987, was identified by the Colorado Bureau of Investigation by comparing the crime scene DNA with a known close, living relative. At the time of the murder, he was 26 years old. Chief of Police Doug Shoemaker said in a press release, "Cold cases are never truly closed. Solving these types of cases is very important to our detectives and our agency, and while not every case is solved, we are proud of the hard work put forth by those who helped provide answers to the victim's family and our community in as many cases as is possible."
Ricky Jay Severt	Sexual assault and beating death of 23-year-old mother of two Jennifer Watkins	Colorado Springs, Colorado, USA	1999-11-05	2001-11-02	Watkins's husband called in a missing person report after she failed to pick up her two children and return home after her shift in the kitchen at Memorial Hospital in Colorado Springs. Her body was found days later in a remote stairwell at the hospital where she worked. Even though Severt had access to that stairwell as a member of the maintenance staff, he was not considered a suspect after his interview early in the investigation. Severt died as a result of an automobile accident and prosecutors have "closed the case."
James Alan Neal	Sexual assault and murder of 11-year-old schoolgirl Linda O'Keefe	Newport Beach, California, USA	1973-07-06	2020-07-22	Neal was identified as a result of genetic genealogical research using Family TreeDNA. Detectives who worked the homicide originally carefully preserved DNA evidence that made Neal's identification possible over 45 years later. Neal, who also was known as James Albert Layton Jr., was arrested on 22 February 2019, and was placed in a maximum-security jail to await trial. On 25 May 2020, Neal became ill and was transported to a local hospital, where he subsequently died on 22 July 2020.
Jaime "James" Zamora	Kidnapping and sexual assault of a 7-year-old girl	Greeley, Colorado, USA	2001-09-18	2014	Zamora was 26 at the time of the crime. In 2019, Parabon produced a Snapshot image of him and also conducted a genetic genealogy investigation. Positive identification was made when the DNA evidence was compared to evidence from Zamora's autopsy. Greeley Police detective Robert Cash has asked to be contacted at (970) 350–9601 by anyone who has more information about Zamora, who was estranged from his family, worked in a Greeley sandwich shop that is now closed, and a loner.
Ronald Albert Shroy	Murder of 17-year-old Eric Goldstrand and sexual assault and murder of his 16-year-old girlfriend Lliana Adank	Eugene, Oregon, USA	1977-06-09	2021-02-24	DNA evidence obtained at the crime scene and analyzed by Parabon led to the authorities tracking down the Shroy brothers, who were living in Mesa, Arizona. Before they could question either, however, the pair got into a fight, resulting in the younger one being harmed while Ronald committed suicide on the spot.
David Edward Doran	Serial rapes as the "Myers Park Rapist"	Charlotte, North Carolina, USA	1990–06 to 1999–01	2008-06-24	From 1990 to 1999, an unidentified rapist broke into various homes in the neighborhood of Myers Park and sexually assaulting at least 15 victims, most of which were underage. Doran was linked to the rapes via his DNA in December 2021, but could not be arrested, as he has been deceased since 2008.
Ray Mason Whitson Jr.	Murder of 19-year-old Kirk Wiseman and sexual assault and murder of his 17-year-old girlfriend Cynthia Frayer	Klamath Falls, Oregon, USA	1978-09-24	1996-04-15	At the time of the crime, Whitson lived and worked as a lumberman, and is believed to have picked up the couple while they were hitchhiking. Parabon used DNA recovered from the crime scene to tentatively link the victims with Whitson's family members, eventually leading to him. However, he could not be arrested, as it was discovered that he died in Texas in 1996 from an undisclosed illness.
John Charles Bolsinger	Serial murders of Gladys Hensley, Janice Dickinson and Geraldine Toohey	Eugene, Oregon, USA	1986-06-05 to 1988-02-28	1988-03-23	The three killings were forensically linked via DNA in 2016, more than three decades after they were initially committed. In February 2022, Parabon identified the suspected perpetrator as Bolsinger, a paroled convict with a record for murder in Salt Lake City, Utah, dating back to 1980. However, he could not be arrested as he killed himself in 1988, a little over a month after his final known murder. Police are still interested in learning more about Bolsinger's activities while in Lane County. If you have information about him, police ask you to contact Detective Jennifer Curry at 541-682-5166 or jcurry@eugene-or.gov.
James Paul Forte	Sexual assault and murder of 9-year-old Marise Chiverella	Hazleton, Pennsylvania, USA	1964-03-18	1980-05-16	While a DNA profile was developed of the suspect in 2007, it was not uploaded to Parabon NanoLabs until 2019. A familial match eventually led to Forte, who had convictions for aggravated assault and reckless endangerment, but had died of a suspected heart attack in 1980. At present, it is one of the oldest cold cases to be solved via genetic genealogy. Genetic genealogy was not conducted by Parabon.
Thomas Oscar Freeman	Sexual assault and murder of 32-year-old Lee Rotatori	Council Bluffs, Iowa, USA	1982-06-24	1982–07	The perpetrator's identification was further complicated by the fact that Freeman was adopted. Working as a truck driver at the time of the murder, Freeman's body was found in Cobden, Illinois, four months later, having died in an apparent homicide. His killer remains unidentified, although Rotatori's now-deceased husband has been named as a person of interest.
Mark Alan Long	Attempted murder of Jeff Garner	Watauga, Texas, USA	2003-03-03	2022–04	On the date of the crime, Garner, a policeman, was informed of an ongoing bank robbery and went after the suspect, who opened fire and hit Garner in the leg before speeding away. Analysis from evidence later linked the unknown suspect to a number of bank robberies committed from 1998 to 2003, but were unable to capture the perpetrator. With the aid of Parabon, Identifiers International and GEDMatch, authorities used DNA to link the crime to Long, who now lived in Oklahoma City, Oklahoma. However, he was found dead in an apparent suicide, with police suspecting that he opted to take his life after learning that the authorities were after him.
Cecil "Howie" Trent	Sexual assault and murder of 37-year-old Lisa Fracassi	Waikiki, Hawaii, USA	1994-10-31	2013-08-19	While the perpetrator's DNA was collected in the initial investigation, authorities were unable to link it to anybody at the time. In 2020, the Honolulu Police contacted Parabon and provided the sample, which was later linked back to Trent. He died in 2013 from heart failure in Honolulu, and could not be arrested.
Robert Anthony Brooks	Murder of 17-year-old Michelle Koski	Snohomish, Washington, USA	1990-08-25	2016-10-26	Koski's DNA profile was submitted to GEDmatch and Family Tree DNA by Det. Jim Scharf, who was tasked with handling the cold case, allowing Parabon to work on it as well. They eventually narrowed the suspect list down to Brooks and his brother, and blood sample proved that the former was responsible. At the time of the crimes, he had recently been released from juvenile prison. Brooks died from natural causes in 2016, and thus could not be arrested.
Michael Jeffrey Mellus	Murder of 30-year-old Patricia Stichler	Sylvania, Ohio, USA	1985-01-02	1989-03-22	Mellus, a 17-year-old neighbor at the time of the crime, died in a car crash four years after the murder while serving in the Army.
Stephen Joseph Simcak	Murder of 25-year-old Nadine Madger	Willoughby, Ohio, USA	1980-01-11	2018-06-15	At the time of the crime, Simcak was serving in the Marine Corps. His guilt was confirmed after DNA was obtained from a deceased grandson, which concluded that Simcak was the one responsible for Madger's killing. He could not be arrested, as he died in 2018.
Scott Grim	Murder of 26-year-old Anna Kane	Perry Township, Pennsylvania, USA	1988-10-23	2018	DNA collected from Kane's clothing was later matched to a letter sent to the Reading Eagle, thought to be sent by her killer. Upon giving these samples for examination to Parabon, they were able to identify Grim as the killer. He could not be arrested, as he died from natural causes in 2018.
Giles Daniel Warrick	Rape and murder of 28-year-old Christine Mirzayan; several other rapes as the "Potomac River Rapist"	Washington, D.C., USA	1998-08-01	2022-11-19	Attacks of the "Potomac River Rapist" began May 6, 1991, and possibly ended when Mirzayan was murdered in 1998. The area covered included Washington, D.C., and Montgomery County, Maryland, USA, with these crimes being connected by common DNA at all the scenes. Warrick was arrested in South Carolina and brought to Washington, D.C., in 2019, but was found dead in his cell on November 19, 2022. Authorities believe he took his own life.
Joseph Norman Hill	Sexual assault and murder of 12-year-old Bradley "Brad" Bellino	Boardman, Ohio, USA	1972-04-01	2019-07-03	Hill was confirmed to be a 98% match to foreign DNA found on Bellino's body, but a full 100% could not be ascertained as his body was cremated after his death from natural causes in July 2019. In June 2023, he was linked to the 1975 murder of 13-year-old David Evans, who was evidently stabbed to death in Boardman under similar circumstances. Police are currently investigating him for possible involvement in similar crimes committed around the Boardman area.
Elliott Lloyd Higgins	Multiple sexual assaults	Tuscaloosa, Alabama, and Colorado Springs, Colorado, USA	1990 to 2004	2014	Higgins, a convicted rapist whose convictions date back to the 1970s, was linked to three sexual assaults via his DNA, but could not be arrested as he died in 2014. Due to his profession as a music teacher that required him to travel extensively, investigators believe he may be responsible for more attacks around the country.
Frank Arthur Hall	Rape and murder of 6-year-old Ljubica Topic	Windsor, Ontario, Canada	1971-05-14	2019–02	Hall, a neighbor of the Topic family, was identified as the perpetrator in 2019, but his identity was not revealed until February 2023. He died in February 2019, before he could be arrested.
William Richard DeRoos	Rape and murder of 24-year-old Rita Curran	Burlington, Vermont, USA	1971-07-19	1986-08-07	DNA extracted from a cigarette butt linked DeRoos, who was Curran's neighbor at the time, to her rape and murder. He later moved to Thailand and lived as a Buddhist monk for some time, but eventually returned to the US, where he died of a drug overdose in San Francisco, California. Curran was previously believed to be a possible victim of serial killer Ted Bundy.
Forrest Clyde Williams III	Murder of 16-year-old Pamela Lynn Conyers	Millersville, Maryland, USA	1970-10-16	2018-03-28	Williams died of natural causes in 2018, before he could be arrested. His accomplice, Donald Willard, was identified in 2024, but is also deceased and cannot be tried.
Frank A. Rodriguez	Sexual assault and murder of 65-year-old Joyce Casper	Boise, Idaho, USA	1987-10-13	2007	This identification was made possible with the help of Identifinders International, another genetic genealogy company assigned to the case. Investigators are looking into the possibility that Rodriguez may have committed other crimes.
Bryan Scott Bennett	Sexual assault and murder of 23-year-old Cathy Sposito, and several sexual assaults	Prescott, Arizona, USA	1987-06-13	1994–01	The identification was made after his body was exhumed and DNA retrieved from cheek swabs taken from his brother and a daughter. Bennett shot himself in Kentucky in January 1994.
Tudor Chirila Jr.	Murder of 19-year-old Nancy Elaine Anderson	Waikiki, Hawaii, USA	1972-01-07	2024-01-07	Chirila was identified through comparing his DNA to that which has been found on the crime scene, and he was subsequently arrested at this home in Reno, Nevada. He died awaiting trial on second-degree murder charges.
Unnamed suspect	Attempted murder	Scott County, Indiana, USA	1995–05	2003	The suspect was identified via a familial DNA link, but his name was not released due to the fact that no formal charges can be filed due to the fact he is deceased.
Donald Willard	Murder of 16-year-old Pamela Lynn Conyers	Millersville, Maryland, USA	1970-10-16	2010	Died before he could be arrested. His accomplice, Forrest Clyde Williams, was identified in 2023, but is also deceased and cannot be tried.
William Kernan Jr.	Murder of 14-year-old Maria Honzell	Colorado Springs, Colorado, USA	1977-02-07	2010	Kernan, an acquaintance of the woman Honzell was babysitting for, had been at the apartment on multiple occasions. He died of natural causes in 2010, and thus cannot be arrested.
Donald Lawless	Murder of 28-year-old Marilyn Decker	Davie, Florida, USA	1987-10-22	1995	Lawless, a career criminal who was cremated after his death, was identified after a close relative was found to be a familial match to Decker's murder.

==== Case results: Identification of John and Jane Does ====
Unidentified remains of deceased individuals are given the names Jane Doe for females and John Doe for males. In cases where homicide is suspected, the identification of the remains is the first step in finding the deceased's killer. Not all Does are victims of homicide, however.

Identified	Location of remains	Deceased	Discovered	Identified	Details
Shaquana Marie Caldwell	Glen Burnie, Maryland, USA	2017-05 (?)	2017-06-14	2017-11-13	Caldwell was reported missing by her family members after she had failed to appear at her workplace in Baltimore. After her decomposed remains were discovered, authorities contacted Parabon for assistance, who managed to identify her via dental records. Her boyfriend, convicted murderer Taras Caldwell (no relation), was arrested and charged in her murder.
Edwin Rodriguez	Wolf Creek Township, Pennsylvania, USA	1980 (?)	1980-11-06	2019	A burning body found near the I-80 in Wolf Creek Township, Pennsylvania, on November 6, 1980, but beyond the fact that it appeared to be that of a young white male, nothing was known about the decedent. His DNA profile was later sent to Parabon, who identified the man as Edwin Rodriguez, originally from Chicago. Further investigation led to the identification of Nestor Quintanal, a friend of the Rodriguez family, as the most likely perpetrator in May 2022. He could not be arrested, as he died in Florida in 2002.
Hassan A. Alkebu-Lan	Chesterfield County, Virginia, USA	2016 (?)	2016-03-13	2019–03	The body of AlKebu-Lan, 39, of Richmond, Virginia, was found by a fisherman near the James River. Police do not suspect this was a crime scene as there were no signs of foul play. He was identified in March 2019.
Donna Marie Prudhomme and Audrey Lee Cook	League City, Texas, USA	1991-07 (Prudhomme); 1985-12 (Cook)	1991-09-09 (Prudhomme); 1986-02-02 (Cook)	2019–04	Known individually as "Janet Doe" and "Jane Doe", Prudhomme and Cook's bodies were located at different dates in the Killing Fields, an area bordering Texas's Calder Oil Field, thought to be a dumping ground for the victims of several serial killers from the 1970s until the early 2000s. Each was identified via DNA matches to relatives, but their killer(s) have not been located thus far.
"Julie Valentine"	Greenville, South Carolina, USA	1990-02-13	1990-02-13	2019-04-04	The body of an infant girl inside a box thrown in a trash-littered field behind a local shopping center. After her identification, the infant's mother, Brook Graham, was charged with her death and that of another child committed a year prior. She pleaded guilty to the crimes and was sentenced to 30 years imprisonment.
Roger Hearne Kelso	Anne Arundel County, Maryland, USA	1963 (?)	1985	2019–06	It was determined that Kelso was a homicide victim after he was found inside a trash can during building excavation in 1985. The young man was last seen in 1962 and coins found near his remains date no later than 1963. The perpetrator or perpetrators have not yet been identified. Police have set up a tip line and a $10,000 reward is still being offered for more information about Kelso's murder. Long before Kelso's identification through genetic genealogy, Parabon featured Kelso on their website to demonstrate the combination of DNA phenotyping and facial reconstruction techniques to put a face on unidentified remains.
Tina Len Cabanaw	Angola, Indiana, USA	Before 1999	1999-09-06	2019–07	Cabanaw, a Detroit resident with a history of leaving for days on end without notice, was found in a field in rural with a bra wrapped around her neck, indicating that she had been strangled. A positive match was made through her daughter, who now lives in Colorado. The investigation into Cabanaw's murder is ongoing.
Sandra Renee Morden	Vancouver, Washington, USA	Between spring 1977 and fall 1978	1980–02	2019-10-29	Sandra's bones were discovered by a father and son who were panning for gold in the Fly Creek Area near Amboy, Washington. She was given the name "Fly Creek Jane Doe." Parabon created both a Snapshot Phenotype image and conducted genetic genealogy research to find her family. Sandra's identity was confirmed using a reference DNA sample for the family given by a cousin, who knew the family story about a cousin who had gone missing in the 1970s. Sandra was born in 1962 and would have been about 15 or 16 years old when she died. Because Sandra's skeletal remains show trauma indicative of "homicidal violence," her case file remains open to find her killer.
Perrean Tamar Flennaugh Gray	Sacramento, California, USA	2001–01	2001-01-29	2019-11-29	Gray's charred body was found by firefigters in a burning dumpster, after she had been reported missing earlier that month by family members in San Francisco. Initial composite images depicted her as white, but using DNA phenotyping, Parabon determined that she was of African descent. Due to the circumstances surrounding her death, authorities are seeking information regarding Gray's killer.
William Arthur Fiegener	Parker County, Texas, USA	Fall of 1984	1985–10	2019-12-23	William's remains were buried in a shallow grave discovered by a father and son who were searching for a building site for a new home. CeCe Moore stated that this case was one of the longest she had worked on to-date. Officials have not made public the cause of death, but it was determined to be a homicide. In February 2020, police identified Forrest Ethington, Fiegener's partner in crime, as the most likely murderer. Ethington had confessed to killing "Billy" to another associate after Fiegener was arrested for committing a smash and grab robbery using Ethington's daughter's car. The suspected motive was that Ethington feared that Fiegener would implicate him. Ethington committed additional crimes after Fiegener's death, one for which he was sentenced to prison in 2010. He died in prison in October 2019 at the age of 81. Police announced that they would clear the case "by exception and the reason for the exceptionally cleared status will be death of the offender."
Kelly Gene Perry	Livermore, California, USA	1996	1997-05-27	2020–03	Perry disappeared under suspicious circumstances after leaving his fiancée in Hayward, with his remains found by a farmer in a rural area. Originally thought to possibly be from Central America or Mexico, DNA testing proved that the decedent was from Europe and was eventually identified as Perry. Investigation into his murder is ongoing.
Christy Lynn Floyd	Chester, Virginia, USA	1986–06	1986-08-07	2020–08	Floyd had gone missing from her home in Richmond, and her dismembered remains were later found in a dumpster. An autopsy determined that she could possibly have been preserved in a sealed container to prevent decomposition, but her identity was not ascertained until decades later. Authorities are seeking information to resolve her murder.
Wanda Ann Herr	Government Camp, Oregon, USA	1976	1986-08-02	2020-10-22	Wanda's partial skull, a tooth, and several bone fragments were discovered by two Forest Service workers. Multiple attempts to identify the remains were made in the several decades following the discovery, but it was in January 2019 that the investigation gained renewed momentum. That is when the "Oregon State Medical Examiner's Office received National Institute of Justice (NIJ) grant funds to perform forensic genetic genealogy and DNA phenotyping on 100 unidentified human skeletal remains cases." Wanda was born in 1957, making her approximately 19 years old at the time of her death, which is estimated to be shortly after she was last known to be alive in June 1976. The Clackamas County Sheriff's Office is investigating the case.
Freeman Asher Jr.	Multnomah Falls, Oregon, USA	1977	1979-09-14	2021–01	The last time Asher's family had seen him, he was signing a song that was released in 1977, so this is the year that it is believed that Asher died, at around 34 years of age. Because there were no physical signs of the cause of death on the remains, such as by a violent act, the case has been closed and the remains returned to the family for burial. Asher was formerly known as "John Doe 79-1862."
Marie Petry Heiser	Townsend, Delaware, USA	1977	1977-06-27	2021–03	Heiser, a part-time employee at the Ashbourne Country Club in Cheltenham, Pennsylvania, disappeared sometime in 1977. Her body was found in a drainage ditch along a rural road, but was not positively identified as Heiser's until decades later. While her exact cause of death has not been determined, authorities have said that it is homicidal in nature, with the prime suspects being her husband and serial killer Henry Lee Lucas.
Vincent Marion Trapp	Wellington, Nevada, USA	1991	1992-03-12	2021-05-26	Known as "Sand Canyon John Doe", Trapp's skeleton was found on at an apparent campsite and was likely murdered. Police are currently investigating two potential suspects in his killing.
Steven Alexander Crawford	Ashland, Oregon, USA	1962–1963	1963-07-11	2021-06-25	The body of the approximately 3-year-old toddler was found in a reservoir, but cause of death was undetermined. After his identification in June 2021, it was announced that Crawford's mother, who is now deceased, was last seen with the boy.
Leopoldo Torres Melendez	Lower Lake, California, USA	1970s	1976-11-28	2021–10	The decedent's remains were found in a rural, heavily wooded area, and was identified as Melendez through a DNA match to his biological sister. Melendez, who was born in Puerto Rico but lived in the San Francisco area, disappeared under unclear circumstances and was later beaten to death with a blunt instrument.
Winston Arthur Maxey III	Coos Bay, Oregon, USA	1971	1971-07-29	2021–10	Maxey, a 15-year-old runaway from Boise, Idaho, was identified through his daughter, who was adopted at an early age and never met her father. His cause of death is unclear.
Robin Pelkey	Palmer, Alaska, USA	1983	1984-04-25	2021–10	Nicknamed "Horseshoe Harriet", it was determined that she had been shot to death by serial killer Robert Hansen, who did not know her true identity. In October 2021, using genetic genealogy, she was identified as 19-year-old Robin Pelkey of Anchorage.
Carolyn Dunn Moudy	Davie, Florida, USA	1974–07	1975-12-23	2021–12	The decedent's body was recovered from a canal, where she had been dumped after supposedly being murdered by an unknown assailant. The case was taken up by Parabon and LSU FACES, who positively identified her as 21-year-old Carolyn Moudy of Indianola, Mississippi. The investigation into her murder is ongoing.
Haley Mae Coblentz	Van Duzer State Park, Oregon, USA	2020	2020-12-10	2021–12	The remains of a young girl were found stuffed inside a duffel bag at the Van Duzer State Park. She remained unidentified until a year later, when she was identified as 9-year-old Haley Coblentz. Immediately after her identification, Coblentz's mother Shawna Browning and her girlfriend, Lauren Harrison, were arrested in her murder, but charges against both women were dropped.
Katrina Kay Bentivegna	Caddo County, Oklahoma, USA	1993 (?)	1995-04-24	2022-03-11	On April 24, 1995, the body of Bentivegna, who moved to Oklahoma in the summer of 1993, was found in rural Caddo County with parts of her body removing, indicating that she had been killed. Parabon identified her using DNA extracted from her body. Her murder is under investigation.
"Hood River County John Doe"	Hood River County, Oregon, USA	2008 (?)	2009-12-24	2022-05-04	On December 24, 2009, children playing near a gravel storage facility discovered skeletonized remains of a man while playing in a wooded area, as well as a large suitcase full of clothes and a small backpack. After finding no matches on various missing persons databases, the Oregon State Police Medical Examiner's Office contacted Parabon in 2018, and a sample was sent in 2021. Using their genetic technology, they linked the man's DNA to relatives in Oregon, who had reported him missing in 2008. Per their request, his identity is being withheld.
Sylvia Nicole Smith	Midland County, Texas, USA	2000-02-14	2013-08-01	2022-06-27	On August 1, 2013, oil workers inspecting an oilfield found partial human remains, who were believed to belong to a teenager or young woman of African-American descent. Due to the circumstances she was found in, it was believed that she was the victim of a homicide. The remains were sent for identification at DNA Labs International and later to Parabon NanoLabs, which helped identify the decedent as 16-year-old Sylvia Nicole Smith. Investigations into her death are ongoing.
Angela Mason	Norman, Oklahoma, USA	2008	2008-08-31	2022-08-31	On August 31, 2008, several fishermen who were near the Lake Thunderbird reservoir found a shallow grave containing human remains. After several attempts to identify the decedent, most prominently via her distinctive tattoo, a DNA sample from her remains was sent to Parabon, who eventually identified her as 25-year-old Angela Mason. A member of the Cherokee Nation, she was a divorced mother of four who was last seen near Moore in the spring of 2008, and her death is being treated as a homicide.
Robert Ronald Soden	Fort Myers, Florida, USA	1980s to 2000s	2007-03-27	2022-09-06	One of eight potential victims of the "Hog Trail Killer", a suspected serial killer who sexually assaulted and murdered gay men and transients, collectively called "The Fort Myers Eight." Soden, a transient, was identified via DNA with the help of Florida Department of Law Enforcement and Fort Myers' cold case unit. Like with the other victims, murderer Daniel Conahan is the prime suspect in his killing.
John Barber	Griswold, Connecticut, USA	1843	1990	2022–11	During excavations of an old farm cemetery, archeologists took notice of one coffin in particular - branded "JB 55" - due to the fact that the skeleton had its skull separate from the body and placed on the chest, a practice associated with the New England vampire panic and the belief that this was a way to prevent deceased people from becoming vampires. In November 2022, the skeleton was identified as belonging to John Barber, a farmer who had succumbed to tuberculosis in 1843.
Maria Telles-Gonzalez	Yemassee, South Carolina, USA	1990s	1995-05-24	2022-12-01	Her body, clad only in underwear, was found in a drainage ditch. While coroners determined that she had been strangled to death, they were unable to identify the decedent at the time. Using DNA extracted from previous identification attempts, a volunteer member at Parabon located Telles-Gonzalez's biological son and used his DNA sample to confirm that the victim was his mother. She was last seen in Kissimmee, Florida, and allegedly planned to travel to Puerto Rico, and authorities are currently seeking to identify two potential suspects in her murder.
Philip Kahn	Jonesport, Maine, USA	2000	2000-07-24	2023-01-11	The skeletal remains of an elderly man were found floating in the Atlantic Ocean off the coast Maine, but authorities were unable to identify him at the time. Through a joint effort with the FBI and OCME, Parabon were able to match fingerprints and dental records to those of the 84-year-old Kahn, a resident of Las Vegas, Nevada, who had been reported missing in 2000. It remains unclear how and why he ended up in Maine.
Douglas Wayne Jackson	Fort Lupton, Colorado, USA	2016(?)	2018-12-07	2023-01-31	His remains were found by a crew of land surveyors, and when examined, coroners estimated that the then-unidentified victim might've been deceased since at least 2016. Jackson, a missing person from Aurora, was linked to the remains, but his cause of death is unknown at present.
Elsie Baker	Grants Pass, Oregon, USA	1959	1986-06-19	2023-02-15	Baker, who suffered from cancer and used a wheelchair, disappeared under suspicious circumstances in 1959 from her home in Rogue River. Her remains were found during an excavation years later, but were not positively identified as hers until 2023.
Grace Lorna Narvaez-Webster	Sweet Home, Oregon, USA	2019	2020-04-04	2023-03-07	Narvaez-Webster, who suffered from a mental illness, was reported missing from her home in Olympia, Washington, in March 2021 after she failed to contact her parents for two years. Her body was found in a heavily forested area, but the circumstances and cause of death are currently under investigation.
Brian and Rachel Burr	McAlester, Oklahoma, USA	1990s	1995-04-09	2023-04-11	The Texan couple's badly decomposed bodies were found with gunshot wounds, having likely been killed and dumped there by hitchhikers. This identification was made with the assistance of several law enforcement agencies and University of North Texas Center for Human Identification, who helped Parabon. Investigation into the Burrs' murders is ongoing.
Marty Robin Rupar	Santa Cruz County, California, USA	1983	1988-02-13	2023-05-18	Rupar's skeletal remains were found on an embankment off Bonny Doon Road, in a manner that indicated that a homicide had taken place. He was last known to live in Mississippi and went missing in 1983, and it is currently unclear how he ended up in California.
Robert McReynolds	Hernando County, Florida, USA	1990	1990-11-06	2023-05-19	McReynolds' skeletal remains were found near an intersection, but authorities determined that there were no signs of foul play. He was 63 at the time of his death, and his cremated remains were later turned over to family members.
Jesus Ruiz	Linn County, Oregon, USA	2005	2006-10-23	2023-05-19	Ruiz's remains were found in the woods east of Sweet Home, within the Big Springs Snow Park. He was last seen in 2005, but was never reported missing because his family thought he had been in Mexico. Investigation into his death is ongoing.
"Baby Mary Anne"	Lancaster, Pennsylvania, USA	2007	2007-09-24	2023–05	The baby's body was found inside a large dumpster, and an autopsy determined she had died from asphyxiation. Nicknamed "Baby Mary Anne", Parabon was contacted to help in the case in 2018, managing to identify a second cousin. Through this, they revealed her mother to be Tara Brazzle (née Indrakosit), who was later charged, entered an Alford plea and was sentenced to 5.5-to-20 years imprisonment for the death.
Jeffrey Douglas Kimzey	Union Grove, Alabama, USA	1997	1997-04-15	2023-05-24	Kimzey's body had been dismembered with surgical tools, indicating that his killer likely attempted to conceal his identity. Originally from Santa Barbara, California, he was identified after a familial match was made to a relative living in Madison, Tennessee. Investigation into his murder is ongoing.
Lori Jane Kearsey	Davie, Florida, USA	1983	1984-02-18	2023-10-24	Kearsey, who had been married to a member of a crime family in Boston, Massachusetts, was found strangled inside a canal. As she was never reported missing, it is currently unclear how she ended up in Florida. Her murder is still under investigation.
Lori Anne Razpotnik	Seattle, Washington, USA	1982 – January 1984	1986-01-02	2023-12-19	A runaway from Lewis County who was killed by serial killer Gary Ridgway, who confessed to her murder in 2003.
Sandra "Sandy" Young	Columbia County, Oregon, USA	1968 – 1969	1970-02-23	2023-10 (identified)/2024-02-22 (revealed)	Young, a high school student, disappeared from Portland in the late 1960s and is presumed to be the victim of a homicide. She was identified with DNA provided by a distant family member. Parabon identified her in October 2023, and her identity was revealed in February 2024.
Evelyn Lois Horne Townsend	Vero Beach, Florida, USA	1982	1982-09-01	2024-02-29	Townsend was identified via genetic testing done on a half-sibling, which was done with the help of the Indian River County Sheriff's Office and the Florida Department of Law Enforcement. Investigation into her murder is ongoing.
"Stearns County Jane Doe"	St. Augusta, Minnesota, USA	1983-04-03	1983-04-03	2024-07-11	The female infant was born full term, and a coroner could not determine a cause of death. Because of this, and due to the fact that the mother is deceased, the case has been closed.
Vivian Moss	San Jose, California, USA	1981–07	1981-07-11	2025-05-28	Moss' dismembered torso was found in a field, alongside two religious pendants. The cause of death was ruled to be a stabbing, and her murder is still under investigation.
