= Murder of Marise Chiverella =

Child murder in 1964

- Victim Marise Chiverella (left) and murderer James Forte (right)
- Location: Hazleton, Pennsylvania, U.S.
- Date: March 18, 1964; 62 years ago c. 8:10 a.m. EST (murder) c. 1 p.m. EST (discovery of body)
- Attack type: Child murder by strangling, child rape, kidnapping
- Victim: Marise Ann Chiverella
- Perpetrator: James Paul Forte
- Motive: Sexual gratification
- Inquiry: Investigation concluded in February 2022 after identification of perpetrator

On March 18, 1964, Marise Ann Chiverella, a 9-year-old American girl, was raped and murdered while on her way to school by 22-year-old James Paul Forte in Hazleton, Pennsylvania.

The murder went unsolved for nearly 58 years, until it was announced by authorities in 2022 that the perpetrator had been identified as James Paul Forte using investigative genetic genealogy. It is believed to be the oldest cold case in Pennsylvania to be solved through this method. The murder's solving gained major media coverage, partially due to the fact that 20-year-old college student Eric Schubert had a significant role in the identification of Forte.

== Murder ==
On the morning of March 18, 1964, 9-year-old Marise Ann Chiverella left home for school, carrying canned goods to give to her teacher, at St. Joseph's Parochial School in Hazleton, Pennsylvania. At some point while Chiverella was walking to school, she was kidnapped by James Paul Forte. Forte raped and then murdered Chiverella by strangling.

In the afternoon of the same day, a man was giving his 16-year-old nephew driving lessons when they encountered what they initially thought was a "large doll" in a coal-mining pit, but soon realized it was Chiverella's body and called police.

== Investigation ==
Despite months of nonstop work, authorities were not able to retrieve any initial leads following the murder.

Decades later, in 2018, the authorities teamed up with Parabon NanoLabs, a DNA technology and genetic genealogy company. The following year, the company shared the DNA profile with genealogical databases.

The authorities began to work with genealogist and Elizabethtown College student, then 18-year-old Eric Schubert, in 2020. DNA from semen on Chiverella's clothing was uploaded to public genealogy databases, leading to a distant cousin of the perpetrator whom Schubert then identified.

=== 2022 update and identification of perpetrator ===
On February 12, 2022, authorities announced that with assistance from Schubert's research and Parabon NanoLabs' initial work, the perpetrator had been identified as 22-year-old James Paul Forte. He lived six or seven blocks from Chiverella, but did not have any known relation to her or her family. Once Forte was identified as the prime suspect in the murder, an exhumation of his body was approved for the purpose of obtaining a tissue sample so that his DNA could be compared to that from the semen evidence preserved from the crime scene.

== Perpetrator ==
James Paul Forte (1941–1980) was a bartender and bar supplies salesman from the Hazleton area. He was born in Hazleton and lived in the town his entire life. He was never married and never had any known children. Forte was arrested in 1974 in an unrelated case on charges of rape (Note: "Involuntary deviate sexual intercourse" in Pennsylvania law.) and sexual assault. Forte was given a plea deal for the less serious conviction of aggravated assault and was sentenced to one year probation. He was arrested again in 1978 on charges of reckless endangerment and harassment. He died in 1980, at the age of 38, from a reported heart attack at the bar where he worked.

== See also ==
- List of kidnappings (1960–1969)
