= Murders of Lee Rotatori and Thomas Freeman =

Murders in 1982

Murder of Lee Rotatori
- Murder victim Lee Rotatori
- Location: Council Bluffs, Iowa, U.S.
- Date: June 25, 1982; 44 years ago
- Attack type: Murder by stabbing, sexual assault
- Weapon: Knife
- Victims: Lee Gunsalus Rotatori, aged 32
- Perpetrator: Thomas Oscar Freeman
- Motive: Unclear
- Inquiry: Investigation concluded in February 2022 after identification of perpetrator

Murder of Thomas Freeman
- Murderer and murder victim Thomas Freeman
- Location: Cobden, Illinois, U.S.
- Date: c. July 1982 (murder); October 30, 1982 (discovery of body)
- Attack type: Murder by shooting
- Victims: Thomas Oscar Freeman, aged 35
- Perpetrator: Unknown
- Motive: Unknown

On June 25, 1982, Lee Gunsalus Rotatori, a 32-year-old American woman, was sexually assaulted and murdered in her hotel room by Thomas Oscar Freeman in Council Bluffs, Iowa. The murder went unsolved for nearly 40 years, until it was announced by authorities in 2022 that the perpetrator had been identified as Freeman using investigative genetic genealogy.

Around July 1982, Freeman himself was murdered by an unidentified perpetrator in Cobden, Illinois. His decomposing body was found in a shallow grave around three months after his murder. As of 2025, the murder of Freeman remains unsolved and the case remains open, and investigators believe the two murders were connected.

== Murder of Lee Rotatori ==
Lee Rotatori was a 32-year-old American woman from Nunica, Michigan, who had recently relocated to Council Bluffs to work at the nearby Jennie Edmundson Hospital in June 1982. She was new to the area and did not have permanent housing, so she stayed at the Best Western Frontier Motor Lodge hotel for several nights.

On the morning of June 25, 1982, Rotatori's boss called the hotel because she had not appeared for her first formal day of work. When employees went to check on her room, they found her murdered and turned over the scene to investigators. They found that she had been murdered by a single stab wound to the heart, and that she had been sexually assaulted. There were no formal suspects for decades.

== Investigation ==
An Omaha World-Herald article dated July 4, 1982, published 10 days after Rotatori's body was discovered, reported then-Sergeant Larry Williams as saying, "the killer could have been five feet away or a thousand miles away." In an attempt to find answers, her employer and other local organizations put up rewards for thousands of dollars, but with no success. As a result, a cold case with no suspects or answers began, and no suspects were revealed for decades.

In 2019, authorities submitted DNA evidence to Parabon NanoLabs in an attempt to identify a suspect. They additionally were assisted by volunteer genealogist and Elizabethtown College student, Eric Schubert. In February 2021, Thomas Oscar Freeman was found to be the apparent owner of DNA found at the crime scene. Freeman's daughter agreed to give a DNA sample, which confirmed him as the perpetrator of the murder.

In 2022, it was announced by authorities that the perpetrator had been identified as Freeman. It was also revealed that Freeman himself was the victim of a murder around July 1982. His decomposing body was discovered on October 30, 1982. It was determined that his body had sustained multiple gunshot wounds before being thrown into a shallow grave. Investigators believe the two murders were connected.

=== Rotatori's husband ===
Lee Rotatori's husband, Gerald "Jerry" Stanley Nemke, was initially looked at as a person of interest in Rotatori's murder, but was quickly ruled out as authorities determined he had a solid alibi.

Jerry Nemke had a past criminal record. On April 29, 1960, in Chicago, Illinois, at the age of 17, he bludgeoned a 16-year-old waitress, Marilyn Duncan, to death with a brick. He was tried and convicted of murder and was sentenced to death. His conviction was later overturned on appeal, with the Supreme Court of Illinois ruling that Nemke's preliminary hearing was not conducted fairly. He was convicted once again on retrial, and was instead sentenced to 75 years in prison. He was released early on parole at some point during his sentence.

After the identification of Thomas Freeman as Rotatori's murderer, Nemke was named as a person of interest in Freeman's murder. Authorities said Nemke's college was around 15 miles from where Freeman's body was discovered, and that Nemke and Freeman were previous acquaintances. Nemke died in March 2019.

== See also ==
- List of unsolved murders (1980–1999)
