= Robert Hayes (serial killer) =

American serial killer (born 1982)

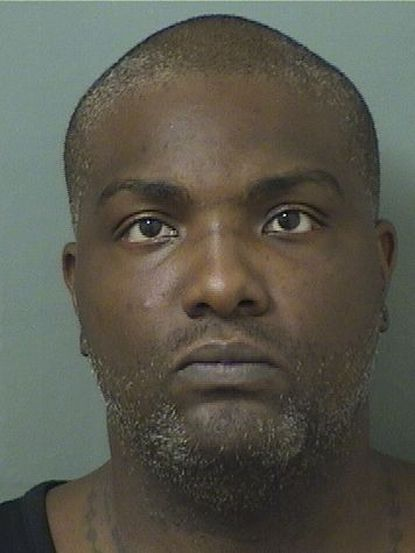
- Palm Beach County Sheriff's Office mug shot
- Born: Robert Tyrone Hayes; March 12, 1982 (age 44); West Palm Beach, Florida, U.S.
- Other name: The Daytona Beach Killer
- Height: 6 ft 4 in (193 cm)
- Conviction: First degree murder (3 counts)
- Penalty: 3 consecutive life sentences without parole

Details
- Victims: 3 confirmed; 4–7+ suspected
- Span of crimes: December 2005 – February 2006 (possibly until March 2016)
- Country: United States
- State: Florida
- Date apprehended: September 15, 2019

Robert Tyrone Hayes (born March 12, 1982) is an American serial killer who was convicted of three murders in the Daytona Beach, Florida, area between December 2005 and February 2006. DNA tests have also linked him to a fourth murder committed in March 2016. In addition, he remains the prime suspect in the murder of another woman in December 2007.

The first three murders that were committed in Daytona Beach, Florida, garnered high media attention, and before Hayes' identification, the perpetrator was nicknamed The Daytona Beach Killer. Investigators were not able to close in on a suspect in time. In December 2007, the murder of a woman in the same area caused a re-investigation to be brought forward, but again, Hayes remained elusive. In December 2016, DNA tests on a woman found murdered in Palm Beach County in March 2016 matched DNA found on the original three murdered women.

On September 15, 2019, authorities charged Hayes with one count of first-degree murder based upon DNA tests. On September 16, he was charged on three additional counts of first-degree murder. Additional testing after his arrest confirmed the link. Investigators had identified Hayes after identifying his family members through genetic genealogy, a tactic that has been used to solve numerous cold cases, most famously the Golden State Killer. In February 2022, Hayes was convicted on three counts of first-degree murder and the following month was sentenced to three consecutive life sentences without the possibility of parole.

== Early life ==
Robert Tyrone Hayes was born on March 12, 1982, in West Palm Beach, Florida, the youngest of four children. Growing up, Hayes' was raised primarily by his mother, as his father had been murdered shortly after his birth, and according to later reports Hayes received an uncertain amount of abuse as a child. When he was young, presumably a teenager, he was molested by a family member of a similar age. He was described as chubby in his adolescence, resulting in Hayes often being bullied.

=== Personality and education ===
Nicknamed "Squeaky" by friends and family, Hayes was described as someone who was always there for people, friendly with neighbors, outspoken, and recited poetry in Miami. He was known by friends to have an active sex life, attending sex parties, suspected of inviting prostitutes over, and at one point he invited a family member to a sex party. He was also described as someone with a good sense of humor and a fun, positive attitude. Hayes had a girlfriend in the 2000s, whom he had a child with.

Between 2000 and 2006, Hayes attended Bethune–Cookman College, now Bethune–Cookman University, studying criminal justice. He graduated with a degree in criminal justice. He was known to be helpful to friends and acquaintances. Friends also explained Hayes had an interest in cooking, and attempted to start his own cooking business in Charlotte, North Carolina.

== Victims ==
=== Daytona Beach ===
==== 2005–06 murders ====
The first known victim was 45-year-old Laquetta Mae Gunther, who was found in an alley on December 26, 2005. She had been shot in the back of the head. DNA was recovered from the scene. Laquetta had gone missing two days prior on Christmas Eve, when she was making dinner plans with her friend Stacey Dittmer. When the time came, Laquetta never showed up. She was known to have worked as a sex worker. The second victim was 34-year-old Julie Green, found January 14, 2006. She was also known to have worked as a sex worker. She had also been shot in the back of the head. No DNA was recovered, but tire tracks were found. The tires were for a 2003 Taurus or Sable and in fact the exact tires were later found.

Just over a month later, on February 24, 2006, police found the body of Iwana Patton, 35, on a dirt road. She had been shot, but not in the back of the head, and possibly had struggled with her killer. DNA was recovered, along with a shell casing that allowed police to identify the make and model of pistol used (.40-caliber Smith & Wesson Sigma Series VE). Ballistics from recovered bullets and recovered DNA matched.

Authorities received an anonymous telephone call describing the location of Patton's body, but the caller was eventually identified and questioned, and is not a suspect in the killings. All three women are believed to have worked as sex workers in the Daytona Beach area. Police believe the victims voluntarily accompanied their killer, possibly in a vehicle, and were subsequently murdered and dumped in the same area of Daytona Beach. The killer did not attempt to conceal the bodies.

A criminal profile was made of the killer. Investigators theorized that the killer was likely a white male with a female companion in his life whom they resented. It was believed the victims were the result of the killer letting out their frustration on them. The public had their own theories, believing the killer was involved in a certain line of work that was allowing them to not become suspected; some believed the killer was a truck driver, while others thought he was of military background or possibly a police officer.

Numerous suspects were interviewed, including Hayes, because he had bought a .40-caliber Smith & Wesson weeks before the first murder. However, he was not thought to have been involved, and some believe the profile, which mentioned the killer to be white, might have been the reason he was not investigated further.

==== Murder of Stacey Gage ====
The remains of Stacey Charlene Gage, 30, were found on January 2, 2008. She had been shot in the head. Police believe she was killed December 11, 2007, when she left her house which she shared with her grandmother to buy a bag of ice. Police have further stated that the circumstances surrounding the case are eerily similar to the three previous unsolved homicides. Unlike the first three victims, Gage did not have a criminal record involving prostitution. However, she did have a history of drug problems. The van Gage was driving the night she disappeared was later recovered in the parking lot of an apartment complex.

The Daytona Beach PD created a task force to find the killer, who by that time was labeled by police and the media as "The Daytona Beach Killer". Four detectives were assigned to the case with input from agents from the Florida Department of Law Enforcement. The police used field DNA kits to take DNA samples from motorists fitting the profile of a white male with a girlfriend. The samples were taken to a lab to match with genetic material taken from the crime scenes.

=== Palm Beach ===
==== Murder of Rachel Bey ====
On March 7, 2016, the naked body of 32-year-old Rachel Elizabeth Bey was found dead alongside a highway near Jupiter, Florida. An autopsy was performed on her body, which showed she had been strangled and badly beaten, and other evidence showed that Bey had fought her attacker. DNA evidence of the perpetrator was found during the investigation.

In December 2016, detectives involved with the investigation into Bey's murder were notified that the DNA found on Bey's body had matched to DNA samples taken from the original Daytona killings.

=== Other possible victims ===
- In July 2006, the dismembered body of Regan Kendall, 48, was found near Osceola Parkway and Boggy Creek Road in Osceola County.
- Also in July, the body of Kelly Lanthorne, 37, was found near South Orange Blossom Trail in Orange County.
- In October 2006, the body of sex worker Lisa Marie French, 39, of Casselberry was found in Sanford, Florida, behind a warehouse. Police first reported that French had been strangled to death and was a possible victim of the Daytona Beach Killer, but autopsy results were inconclusive in regards to the cause of her death; however, serial rapist Jerry Lee Williams Jr., whom authorities accused of attacking six women and killing two, pleaded guilty to raping and suffocating French and was sentenced to life in prison.

The Orlando Sentinel reported in 2010 that, "According to the FBI, the four killings are among 28 in Florida that are unsolved and connected to serial killings that the bureau suspects were committed by long-haul truckers. Those include 19 deaths along the Interstate 4 corridor between Tampa and Daytona Beach...", but it also noted that "all but one local law-enforcement agency denies any serial-killer cases on its books."

==== Long Island serial killer ====
Between December 2010 and April 2011, the bodies of ten women were found buried under numerous beaches along Long Island, New York. All the women that were found had engaged in prostitution, similar to the killings in Daytona Beach. This prompted theories to suggest both sets of murders could have been perpetrated by the same person, and some people also hinted a possible connection to the Eastbound Strangler, an Atlantic City killer that murdered four women in 2006. If it were to be true, then that meant an unidentified serial killer was responsible for up to 18 murders across the East Coast of the United States between 1996 and 2010.

Investigators have publicly stated however there was no evidence to suggest one person was behind all the murders, and other evidence that has been collected over the years has since ruled out this theory.

== Identification and arrest ==
DNA collected from Daytona Beach Killer victims was run through a genetic database used by people trying to find long-lost relatives and a link to Hayes was established. Hayes was put under surveillance and police collected a used cigarette butt surreptitiously that linked him to the killings.

On September 15, 2019, Palm Beach County officials arrested Hayes, 37, at his West Palm Beach home for the killing of Rachel Bey. He was charged with one count of first-degree murder, and was ordered to be held without bail. DNA found on Bey matched DNA recovered from Gunther and Green, two of the Daytona Beach Killer's victims and ballistics tests connect Hayes to the killing of Patton. Hayes was transferred to Volusia County Jail, where he was charged with three additional counts of first-degree murder.

== Trial ==
Prosecutors originally sought the death penalty for Hayes. Hayes's trial began February 11, 2022. On February 22, 2022, Hayes was found guilty in the murders of Laquetta Gunther, Julie Green and Iwana Patton. On March 2, 2022, Hayes was sentenced to three consecutive life sentences without parole. Hayes is now awaiting to be separately tried for the murder of Rachel Bey.

== See also ==
- Parabon NanoLabs
- List of serial killers in the United States
