= Potomac River Rapist =

Serial rapist and murderer, 1991 to 1998

Suspected Potomac River Rapist
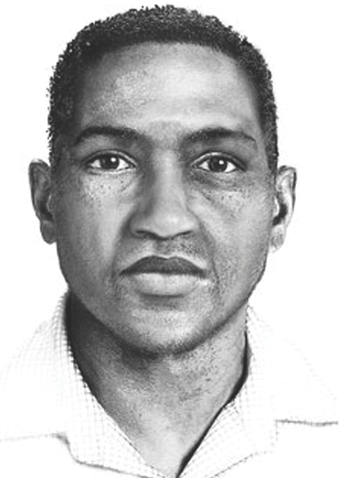
- 1998 sketch of the suspect
- Born: October 16, 1959
- Died: November 19, 2022 (aged 63); D.C. Central Detention Facility, Washington, D.C.
- Years active: 1991-1998

Details
- Victims: 10 raped, 1 murdered
- Date apprehended: November 13, 2019 (suspect)

The Potomac River Rapist refers to a serial rapist and murderer who was active in the Washington, D.C. metropolitan area from 1991 to 1998. Ten sexual assaults and one murder were linked to the suspect by DNA. In November 2019, a suspect identified as Giles Daniel Warrick (October 16, 1959 – November 19, 2022) was arrested and charged in connection with the rapes and murder.

== Crimes ==
The perpetrator is believed to be responsible for ten sexual assaults on girls and women, one of which ended in murder. Each of the attacks have been linked by DNA:

=== Sexual Assaults ===
#	Date	Location
1	Monday, May 6, 1991	Gaithersburg, Maryland
2	Thursday, Sep 5, 1991	Germantown, Maryland
3	Thursday, Nov 21, 1991	Bethesda, Maryland
4	Wednesday, Dec 11, 1991	North Potomac, Maryland
5	Friday, Jan 24, 1992	North Potomac, Maryland
6	Tuesday, March 8, 1994	Rockville, Maryland
7	Saturday, July 20, 1996	The Palisades, Washington, D.C.
8	Wednesday, Feb 26, 1997	Rockville, Maryland
9	Friday, Nov 14, 1997	Silver Spring, Maryland
10	Saturday, Aug 1, 1998	Georgetown, Washington, D.C.

=== Murder of Christine Mirzayan ===
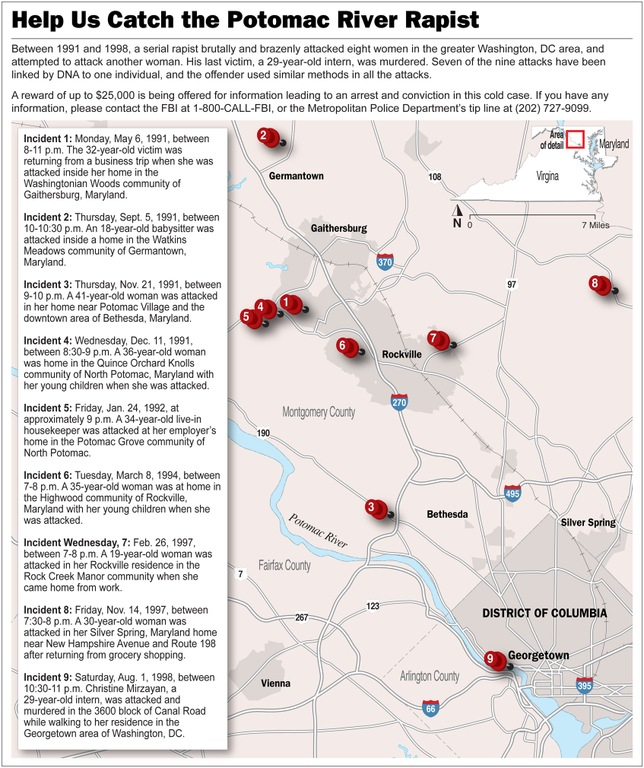
Map of crimes committed by the Potomac River Rapist

On August 1, 1998, at around 10:30 to 11 pm EDT, Christine Mirzayan was walking home in the Georgetown neighborhood of Washington, D.C. when she was dragged into the woods. Mirzayan yelled out and a man responded, asking if she was okay. There was no response from Mirzayan so the man continued on. The next day, she was found raped and murdered by a blow to the head. The police asked for the public's help after the murder and another person who had heard Mirzayan scream during the murder came forward and provided law enforcement with a description of a man who they saw running out of the woods moments after the scream. This description was enough to provide the public with a composite sketch of the suspect.

== Investigation ==
In 2011, the Federal Bureau of Investigation launched a new website in an attempt to bring public attention to the cold case. The site includes a podcast about the crimes, videos, and other information about the case.

Police requested help from Parabon Nanolabs genetic genealogy team who used DNA from the crime scenes to create a family tree for the perpetrator. Parabon suggested five possible suspects to the police and on November 13, 2019, they arrested one of them, Giles Warrick, a 60-year-old man from Conway, South Carolina, who had worked as a landscaper in Maryland at the time of the rapes and murder. He was subsequently charged in connection with the crimes.

On November 19, 2022, the Metropolitan Police Department reported that Warrick had been found dead in his cell in the D.C. Central Detention Facility. Officials believed that Warrick, whose trial was scheduled to begin that month, took his own life.

== See also ==
- Parabon NanoLabs
