= DNA phenotyping =

DNA profiling technique

DNA phenotyping is the process of predicting an organism's phenotype using only genetic information collected from genotyping or DNA sequencing. This term, also known as molecular photofitting, is primarily used to refer to the prediction of a person's physical appearance and/or biogeographic ancestry for forensic purposes.

DNA phenotyping uses many of the same scientific methods as those being used for genetically informed personalized medicine, in which drug responsiveness (pharmacogenomics) and medical outcomes are predicted from a patient's genetic information. Significant genetic variants associated with a particular trait are discovered using a genome-wide association study (GWAS) approach, in which hundreds of thousands or millions of single-nucleotide polymorphisms (SNPs) are tested for their association with each trait of interest. Predictive modeling is then used to build a mathematical model for making trait predictions about new subjects.

== Predicted phenotypes ==
Human phenotypes are predicted from DNA using direct or indirect methods. With direct methods, genetic variants mechanistically linked with variable expression of the relevant phenotypes are measured and used with appropriate statistical methodologies to infer trait value. With indirect methods, variants associated with genetic component(s) of ancestry that correlate with the phenotype of interest, such as Ancestry Informative Markers, are measured and used with appropriate statistical methodologies to infer trait value. The direct method is always preferable, for obvious reasons, but depending on the genetic architecture of the phenotype, is not always possible.

Biogeographic ancestry determination methods have been highly developed within the genetics community, as it is a key GWAS quality control step. These approaches typically use genome-wide human genetic clustering and/or principal component analysis to compare new subjects to curated individuals with known ancestry, such as the International HapMap Project or the 1000 Genomes Project. Another approach is to assay ancestry informative markers (AIMs), SNPs that vary in frequency between the major human populations.

As early as 2004, evidence was compiled showing that the bulk of phenotypic variation in human iris color could be attributed to polymorphisms in the OCA2 gene. This paper, and the work it cited, laid the foundation for the inference of human iris color from DNA, first carried out on basic level by DNAPrint Genomics Beginning in 2009, academic groups developed and reported on more accurate predictive models for eye color and, more recently, hair color in the European population.

More recently, companies such as Parabon NanoLabs and Identitas have begun offering forensic DNA phenotyping services for U.S. and international law enforcement. However, the science behind the commercial services offered by Parabon NanoLabs has been criticized as it has not been subjected to scrutiny in peer-reviewed scientific publications. It has been suggested that it is not known "whether their ability to estimate a face’s appearance is better than chance, or if it’s an approximation based on what we know about ancestry”.

DNA phenotyping is often referred to as a "biologic witness," a play on the term eye-witness. Just as an eye-witness may describe the appearance of a person of interest, the DNA left at a crime scene can be used to discover the physical appearance of the person who left it. This allows DNA phenotyping to be used as an investigative tool to help guide the police when searching for suspects. DNA phenotyping can be particularly helpful in cold cases, where there may not be a current lead. However, it is not a method used to help incarcerate suspects, as more traditional forensic measures are better suited for this.

== Pigmentation Prediction ==
One online tool available to the public and law enforcement is the HIrisPlex-S Webtool. This system uses SNPs that are linked to human pigmentation to predict an individual's phenotype. Using the multiplex assay described in three separate papers, the genotype for 41 different SNPs can be generated, which are linked to hair, eye and skin color in humans. The genotype can then be entered into the HIrisPlex-S Webtool to generate the most probable phenotype of an individual based on their genetic information.no

This tool originally started as the IrisPlex System, consisting of six SNPs linked to eye color (rs12913832, rs1800407, rs12896399, rs16891982, rs1393350 and rs12203592). The addition of 18 SNPs linked to both hair and eye color lead to the updated HIrisPlex System (rs312262906, rs11547464, rs885479, rs1805008, rs1805005, rs1805006, rs1805007, rs1805009, rs201326893, rs2228479, rs1110400, rs28777, rs12821256, rs4959270, rs1042602, rs2402130, rs2378249 and rs683). Another assay was developed using 17 SNPs involved in skin pigmentation to create the current HIris-SPlex System (s3114908, rs1800414, rs10756819, rs2238289, rs17128291, rs6497292, rs1129038, rs1667394, rs1126809, rs1470608, rs1426654, rs6119471, rs1545397, rs6059655, rs12441727, rs3212355 and rs8051733).

The predictions for eye pigmentation are Blue, Intermediate and Brown. There are two categories for hair pigmentation: color (Blond, Brown, Red and Black) and shade (light and dark). The predictions for skin pigmentation are Very Pale, Pale, Intermediate, Dark and Dark to Black. Unlike eye and hair predictions where only the highest probability is used to make a prediction, the top two highest probabilities for skin color are used to account for tanning ability and other variations.

== Genes responsible for facial features ==
In 2018, researchers found 15 loci in which genes are found that are responsible for our facial features.

== Differences from DNA profiling ==
Traditional DNA profiling, sometimes referred to as DNA fingerprinting, uses DNA as a biometric identifier. Like an iris scan or fingerprint, a DNA profile can uniquely identify an individual with very high accuracy. For forensic purposes, this means that investigators must have already identified and obtained DNA from a potentially matching individual. DNA phenotyping is used when investigators need to narrow the pool of possible individuals or identify unknown remains by learning about the person's ancestry and appearance. When the suspected individual is identified, traditional DNA profiling can be used to prove a match, provided there is a reference sample that can be used for comparison.

== Published DNA phenotyping composites ==
- On 9 January 2015, the fourth anniversary of the murders of Candra Alston and her three-year-old daughter Malaysia Boykin, police in Columbia, South Carolina, issued a press release containing what is thought to be the first composite image in forensic history to be published entirely on the basis of a DNA sample. The image, produced by Parabon NanoLabs with the company's Snapshot DNA Phenotyping System, consists of a digital mesh of predicted face morphology overlaid with textures representing predicted eye color, hair color and skin color. Kenneth Canzater Jr. was charged with the murders in 2017.
- On 30 June 2015, NBC Nightly News featured a DNA phenotyping composite, also produced by Parabon, of a suspect in the 1988 murder of April Tinsley near Fort Wayne, Indiana. The television segment also included a composite of national news correspondent Kate Snow, which was produced using DNA extracted from the rim of a water bottle that the network submitted to Parabon for a blinded test of the company's Snapshot™ DNA Phenotyping Service. Snow's identity and her use of the bottle were revealed only after the composite had been produced. In 2018 John D. Miller was charged with the murder.
- Sheriff Tony Mancuso of the Calcasieu Parish Sheriff's Office in Lake Charles, Louisiana, held a press conference on 1 September 2015 to announce the release of a Parabon Snapshot composite for a suspect in the 2009 murder of Sierra Bouzigard in Moss Bluff, Louisiana. The investigation had previously focused on a group of Hispanic males with whom Bouzigard was last seen. Snapshot analysis indicates the suspect is predominantly European, with fair skin, green or possibly blue eyes and brown or black hair. Sheriff Mancuso told the media, “This totally redirects our whole investigation and will move this case in a new direction.” Blake A. Russell was charged with the murder in 2017.
- Florida police chiefs from Miami Beach, Miami, Coral Gables and Miami-Dade jointly released a Snapshot composite of the “Serial Creeper” on 10 September 2015. For more than a year, the perpetrator has been spying on and sexually terrorizing women, and police believe he is connected to at least 15 crimes, possibly as many as 40. In a Miami Beach attack on 18 August 2015, which was first reported to the public on 23 September 2015, the perpetrator spoke in Spanish and told his victim he was from Cuba. Consistent with this claim, Snapshot had previously determined that the subject is Latino, with European, Native American, and African ancestry, an admixture most similar to that found in Latino individuals from the Caribbean and Northern South America.
- On 2 February 2016, the Anne Arundel County Maryland Police Department released what is believed to be the first published composite created by combining DNA phenotyping and forensic facial reconstruction from a victim's skull. The victim's body which had suffered severe upper body trauma was found on 23 April 1985 in a metal trash container at the construction site of the Marley Station Mall in Glen Burnie, MD. Police initially estimated the homicide occurred approximately five months before the body was discovered. Later the date of death was changed to about 1963. Thom Shaw, an IAI-certified forensic artist at Parabon NanoLabs, performed the physical facial reconstruction and the digital adaptation of a Snapshot composite to reflect details gleaned from the victim's facial morphology. In 2019, with the help of Parabon and genetic genealogy, the body was identified as Roger Kelso, born in Fort Wayne, Indiana in 1943. The murderer was not identified.
- Police in Tacoma, Washington, disclosed Parabon Snapshot reports to the public on 6 April 2016 for two male suspects believed to be individually responsible for the deaths of Michella Welch (age 12) and Jennifer Bastian (age 13), both abducted from Tacoma's North End area in 1986, just four months apart. Investigators long believed one person committed both crimes because of their many similarities. However, 2016 DNA testing proved two individuals were separately involved. Snapshot descriptions of the two killers were released to aid the public in generating new leads for the investigations. In 2018 Gary Charles Hartman and Robert D. Washburn were charged with the murders of the two girls. In 2019 Washington State passed a law called "Jennifer and Michella's law" named after the two murdered girls. This law allowed police to take DNA samples from people convicted of indecent exposure and from dead sex offenders.
- Also on 6 April 2016, police in Athens Ohio released a Snapshot composite of an active sexual predator linked to at least three attacks, the most recent in December 2015 near Ohio University.
- On 15 April 2016, the Hallandale Beach Florida Police Department released a Snapshot composite of a suspect believed to be responsible for the murders of Toronto residents David “Donny” Pichosky and Rochelle Wise. It was the first time a Snapshot composite of a female was released to the public.
- On 21 April 2016, police in Windsor, Canada, released a Snapshot composite of the suspect responsible for the abduction and murder of Ljubica Topic in 1971. It was the first public release of a Snapshot composite outside of the United States and, at the time, the oldest case to which the technology had been applied.
- On 11 May, the Loudoun County Sheriff's Office in Virginia released a Snapshot composite of a suspect responsible for abducting and sexually assaulting a 9-year-old girl in 1987.
- On 16 May 2016, eve of the third anniversary of veteran John “Jack” Fay's murder, the Warwick Rhode Island Police Department released a Snapshot composite produced using DNA taken from a hammer found near the crime scene. Police hoped the composite would generate fresh leads in a case that may have involved multiple assailants.
- On 3 May 2017 Idaho Falls, Idaho Police released a DNA phenotype composite sketch from DNA found at the murder scene of Angie Dodge on 13 June 1996. Police hoped the widespread distribution of the composite sketch would generate new leads into the suspect. Excerpt from Idaho Falls Police Department Press release: "The crime scene and evidence collected at the scene, including the collection and extraction of one major and two minor DNA profiles, indicates that there was more than one individual involved in the death of Angie Dodge. With current technologies, the major profile collected is the only viable DNA sample that can be used to make an identification." Christopher Tapp was released in 2017 after spending 20 years in jail for taking part in the rape and murder of Angie Dodge although his DNA did not match DNA at the crime scene. In May 2019 Brian Leigh Dripps confessed to the murder of Dodge after Idaho Falls, Idaho Police charged Dripps. Dripps DNA matched DNA left at the crime scene. Parabon Nanolabs had helped investigate this case using DNA genetic genealogy and GEDmatch.

== See also ==
- DNA
- Phenotype
- Genotyping
- Genome-wide association study
- Single-nucleotide polymorphisms
- Predictive modeling
