= Murders of Jay Cook and Tanya Van Cuylenborg =

1987 double murder in Seattle, Washington, United States

Jay Cook
- Born: Jay Roland Cook; 16 December 1966; British Columbia
- Died: 18 November 1987 (aged 20)
- Body discovered: 26 November 1987
- Partner: Tanya Van Cuylenborg

Tanya Van Cuylenborg
- Born: 7 March 1969; British Columbia
- Died: 18 November 1987 (aged 18)
- Body discovered: 24 November 1987
- Partner: Jay Cook

Jay Roland Cook (16 December 1966 – 18 November 1987) and Tanya Van Cuylenborg (7 March 1969 – 18 November 1987) were a Canadian couple from Saanich, British Columbia who were murdered while on a trip to Seattle, Washington in November 1987.

== Events prior to the murders ==
Cook and Van Cuylenborg met in high school and had been in a relationship for about six months. On 18 November 1987, they left in Cook's father's bronze 1977 Ford Club van for an overnight trip to the Seattle area to purchase parts for Cook's father's business.

Cook and Van Cuylenborg took the MV Coho ferry from Victoria to Port Angeles, Washington. They then drove south-east on Route 101 to Bremerton, where they boarded a second ferry to Seattle. A fuel receipt later found in the van confirmed that they purchased fuel on the road between Port Angeles and Bremerton. The pair was last seen boarding the ferry in Bremerton.

Cook's and Van Cuylenborg's families became concerned when the couple did not return home as planned on 19 November and did not make contact. On 20 November, they were reported missing.

== The murders ==
On 24 November, Tanya Van Cuylenborg's half-naked body was found in a ditch by a rural road near Alger, in Skagit County, Washington, a short distance south of Bellingham. She had been raped and shot in the head. Investigators initially considered Cook a suspect, though both Cook's and Van Cuylenborg's families vehemently rejected this possibility.

On 25 November, Tanya's wallet and keys were found discarded near the Greyhound station in Bellingham. The van was found a few blocks away. Inside the van were plastic ties of the same type used to bind Tanya, plastic gloves, and various receipts, including the Bremerton-Seattle ferry ticket, confirming the belief that the couple took the second ferry. However, Tanya's Minolta X-700 35 mm camera, which she had brought on the trip, was missing and has never been recovered.

On 26 November, Jay Cook's body was discovered nearly 60 miles from where Tanya's body was found two days earlier. Jay had been beaten with rocks and strangled. A pack of cigarettes was stuffed down his throat.

== Investigation and later events ==
The police believed that the killer was taunting them by leaving the plastic gloves in plain view. Detective Robert Gebo of the Seattle Police Department stated: "He leaves those behind as a sign to the police that you needn't look for fingerprints because I wore these gloves. And he has confidence that there's nothing that's going to connect him with these crimes."

The police were in fact able to obtain the suspect's DNA from the van, but there was no match on any of the criminal databases. Despite the lack of a match, the police believed that the specific manner in which the victims were killed (which has not been revealed in detail publicly) suggested that the killer was familiar with the prison system. The lack of a match despite a potential prison background could be explained by the suspect having been incarcerated before DNA collection from criminals became commonplace or technologically possible.

Investigators believed that the couple might have met their killer on one of the ferries, most likely the second one, and offered him a ride upon reaching Seattle.

In the months after the murders, both victims' families received a series of taunting greeting cards featuring graphic descriptions of the murders. The cards bore postmarks from Seattle, Los Angeles, and New York, and were written by the same person. In 2010, it was announced that the writer of the cards had been found: a 78-year-old Canadian transient with mental health issues. The police confirmed that he was not the killer and had no connection to the crime.

=== Perpetrator ===
On 11 April 2018, a composite sketch of the suspect was released based on the DNA collected from semen found on Van Cuylenborg's trousers at the crime scene using a process called "snapshot DNA phenotyping" by Parabon NanoLabs. The case was also investigated by Parabon using genetic genealogy by uploading the DNA to the public website GEDmatch.com, the same site that led to the arrest of the Golden State Killer suspect Joseph James DeAngelo.

On 18 May 2018, the Snohomish County Sheriff announced that William Earl Talbott II had been arrested for the murder of Van Cuylenborg. He was found guilty in June 2019 of two counts of aggravated first-degree murder and sentenced to two sentences of life imprisonment without parole.

On 7 December 2021, an appellate court overturned the conviction of William Earl Talbott II citing juror bias. Prosecutors were planning on holding a second trial. On 22 December 2022, this was rejected.

On 22 December 2022, the Washington State Supreme Court reinstated the guilty verdict because the defense had peremptory challenges available but chose not to use one to dismiss the juror. Talbott remains in custody awaiting further appeals.

== See also ==
- List of solved missing person cases (1980s)
