= Keene Creek =

Stream in Oregon, U.S.

Coordinates: 42°05′30″N 122°22′04″W

Keene Creek is a stream in the U.S. state of Oregon. It is a tributary to Jenny Creek.

Keene Creek was named after Granville Keene, who was killed in 1855 near its banks.
