= National Register of Historic Places listings in Dale County, Alabama =

Location of Dale County in Alabama

This is a list of the National Register of Historic Places listings in Dale County, Alabama.

This is intended to be a complete list of the properties and districts on the National Register of Historic Places in Dale County, Alabama, United States. Latitude and longitude coordinates are provided for many National Register properties and districts; these locations may be seen together in a Google map.

There are four properties and districts listed on the National Register in the county.

This National Park Service list is complete through NPS recent listings posted January 9, 2026.

	Name on the Register	Image	Date listed	Location	City or town	Description
1	Claybank Log Church	Claybank Log Church	November 7, 1976 (#76000321)	E. Andrews Ave. 31°26′48″N 85°39′41″W	Ozark	
2	Samuel Lawson Dowling House		May 30, 1996 (#96000594)	311 Owens St. 31°27′25″N 85°38′30″W	Ozark	
3	J. D. Holman House		February 19, 1982 (#82002007)	409 E. Broad St. 31°27′35″N 85°38′14″W	Ozark	
4	Oates-Reynolds Memorial Building		June 13, 1974 (#74000409)	Oates St. 31°19′51″N 85°35′46″W	Newton	

== See also ==
- List of National Historic Landmarks in Alabama
- National Register of Historic Places listings in Alabama
