= Bill Sketoe =

African–American minister and lynching victim (1818–1864)

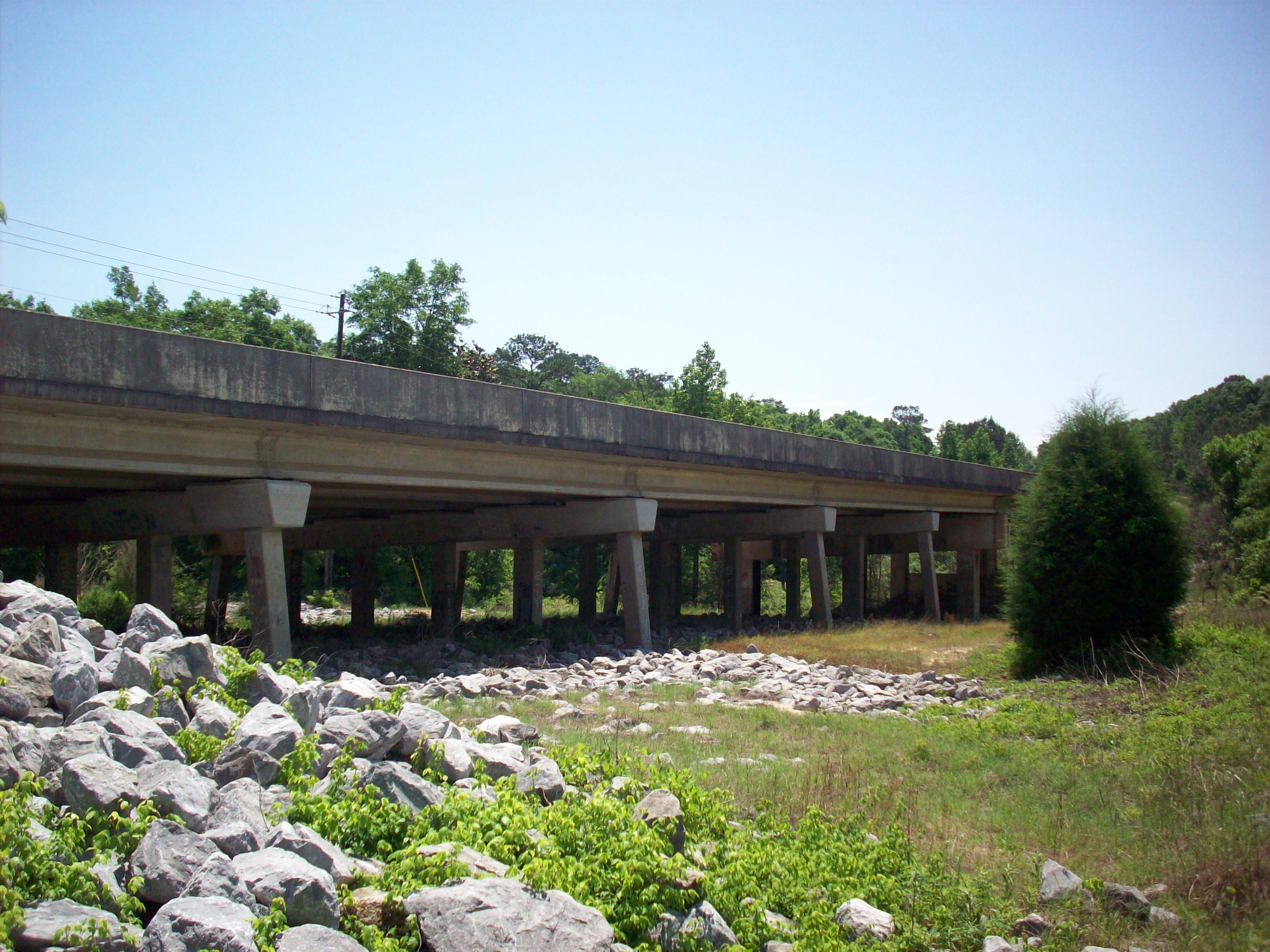
Approximate site of the hanging of Bill Sketoe, beneath Alabama Highway 134 bridge, in Newton, Alabama

William Sketoe Sr. (June 8, 1818 – December 3, 1864) was a Methodist minister from the south Alabama town of Newton, whose lynching there on December 3, 1864, gave birth to one of Alabama's best-known ghost stories. While locally-told stories of his life usually say that he was hanged on trumped-up charges of desertion from the Confederate Army, other sources show that he was killed for allegedly aiding pro-Union renegades in the area. Whatever the reason for his murder, a shallow hole dug beneath Sketoe's feet during the hanging (to accommodate his large frame) ultimately led to stories about "the hole that won't stay filled." According to witnesses, this hole never disappeared—even after being filled numerous times—retaining its original dimensions for the next 125 years.

Sketoe's tale became a staple of Southern folklore, and was later immortalized by Alabama author Kathryn Tucker Windham in her 13 Alabama Ghosts and Jeffrey. His hanging site remained a local tourist attraction for decades, and continues to attract visitors even though the hole itself recently disappeared due to flooding in the area. Today the site of Sketoe's lynching lies beneath the Alabama Highway 134 bridge over the Choctawhatchee River, and a monument to Sketoe has been erected nearby.

== Life ==
=== Early years ===
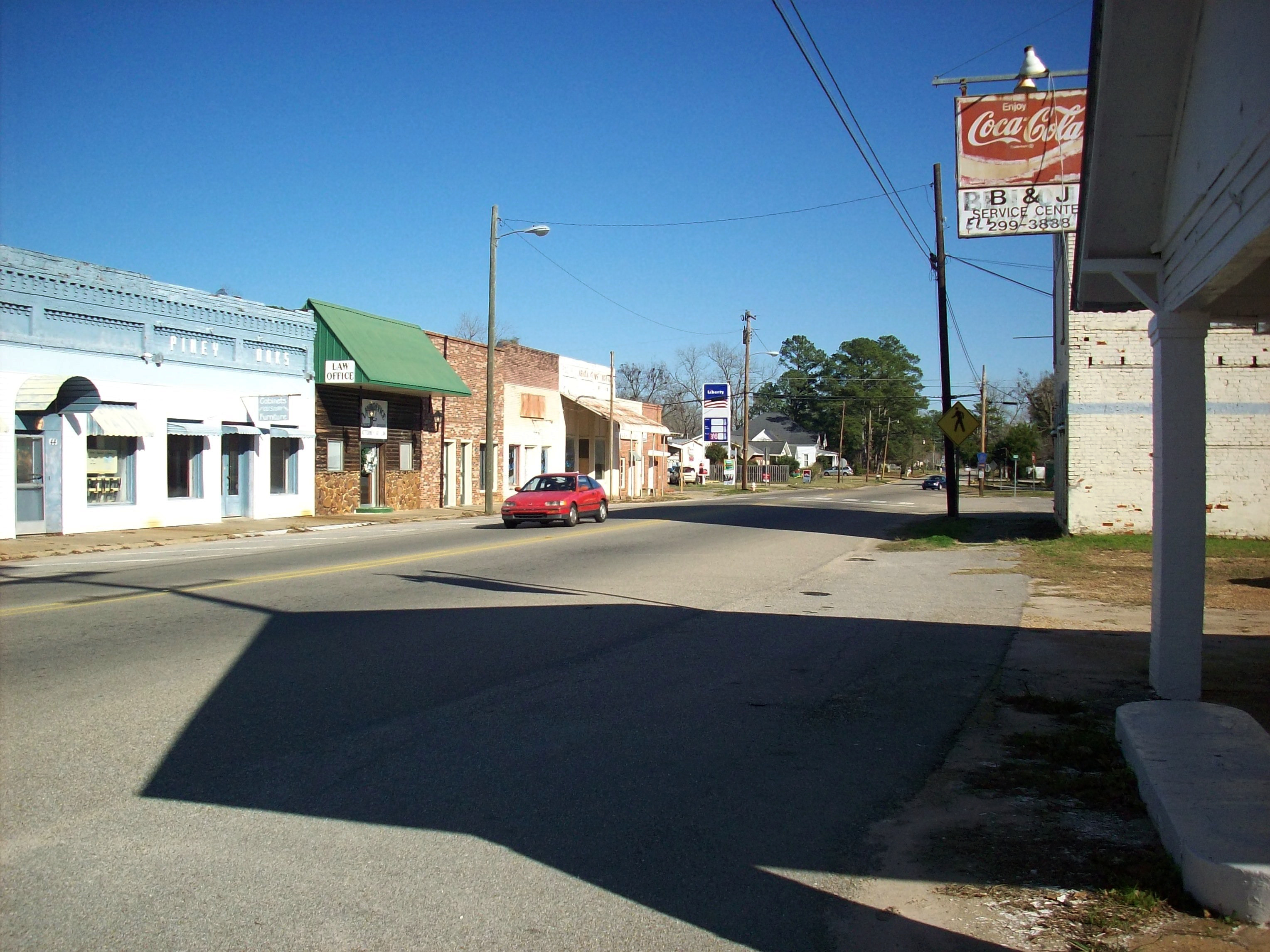
Newton, Alabama, where Bill Sketoe lived prior to his murder.

While much of Bill Sketoe's story is difficult to reconstruct with certainty, he is known to have resided in Newton, Alabama prior to the Civil War, and to have been lynched there on December 3, 1864. The main source for his tale is Kathryn Tucker Windham's 13 Alabama Ghosts and Jeffrey, which tells the legend of Sketoe's life and death as it has been related for generations in and around Newton. However, certain details of this story—such as Sketoe's alleged Confederate war service and the precise reason for his lynching—are subject to controversy based upon other available records. While the legend attributes his death to an ultimately romantic cause (Sketoe's desire to care for his desperately ill spouse), other accounts hint at far more sinister reasons behind his demise, involving Sketoe's alleged (but never proven) collaboration with Unionist local guerrillas.

According to the legend, Sketoe was born in Madrid, Spain on June 8, 1818, and came to Dale County, Alabama as a boy with his father. He seemed to be well liked in the community, and chose the ministry as his vocation. While serving as a circuit rider in the Wiregrass area, Sketoe met and married Sarah Clemmons, with whom he ultimately fathered eight children. Sketoe allegedly entered the Southern Army during the Civil War, though government archives contain no record of his service in any Confederate unit or local militia. Sketoe supposedly served until the fall of 1864, when he received word that his wife had fallen ill. He accordingly resolved to return home until his spouse had recovered—or so the story goes.

=== Prelude to murder ===
Regardless of the truth or falsehood behind this or any version of Sketoe's tale, one fact is certain: Sketoe, for whatever reason, ultimately ran afoul of the Newton Home Guard commanded by Joseph Breare—and that led to his murder.

During the Civil War, Dale County had become a lawless place: the circuit court held no sessions during the last two years of the war, while nearby pine forests harbored numerous deserters and Unionists, who frequently emerged to terrorize the locals. Enraged citizens formed Home Guard units to defend against their depredations; one such outfit was led by Captain Joseph Breare. Breare was a lawyer in Newton, and was described by his partner's son as "an Englishman" who had moved to Dale County in the 1850s. He was an Alabama delegate to the Democratic National Convention of 1860, and served as a Lieutenant in Company E, 15th Alabama Infantry, which was recruited in Dale County. Captured at Gettysburg, he was later exchanged and returned home to serve as commander of the local Home Guard unit. Breare and his outfit, locally referred to as "Buttermilk Rangers" because they were also in the service of the Confederate conscript department, had resolved to hunt down and punish all deserters; he had already hanged two men for alleged acts of treason.

Two different versions exist as to the cause of Sketoe's death. The legend (as related by Windham) says that although Sketoe offered papers indicating that he had hired a substitute to serve in his place (according to the story), the Home Guard refused to believe him, and Breare decided to hang him as a deserter. However, historians have pointed out that the Confederacy had repealed its substitution laws in early 1864, making the legend's assertion that Sketoe had hired a substitute questionable, at best. Furthermore, as noted above, no records exist of Bill Sketoe having ever served in any Confederate or state military unit to begin with.

An alternative view of the reasons behind Sketoe's lynching is provided by historian David Williams in his book Rich Man's War: Caste, Class, and Confederate Defeat in the Lower Chattahoochee Valley. Williams indicates that Sketoe was suspected of helping John Ward, the leader of a local band of deserters and pro-Union guerrillas. Ward had ambushed a Confederate ammunition transport in Dale County two months earlier, killing an officer; one of Breare's men had subsequently been shot during a skirmish with Ward near the current county seat of Ozark. Breare had tried to hang three local men for alleged collaboration in the attack on the ammunition train, but was prevented from doing so by another Confederate officer due to lack of evidence against them. Although Sketoe was never formally charged or tried for his own alleged acts of collusion with Ward, and although not one piece of hard evidence was ever publicly produced to corroborate Breare's allegations of treason, the Home Guard commander apparently decided to make Sketoe his third victim, anyway.

== Lynching ==
According to the legend, Sketoe was waylaid on the afternoon of December 3, 1864, as he crossed the wooden bridge over the Choctawhatchee River north of Newton. Breare and his men dragged the preacher into the nearby woods, beating him and forcing him to crawl through the sand while they prepared to kill him. Sketoe was next hauled to a waiting buggy, and a rope was thrown over a post oak limb and put around his neck. A friend of Sketoe's happened by the scene at this time; unable to dissuade the Home Guard from their intended course, he ran to Newton for help. Anxious to get on with the hanging, Breare asked Sketoe if he had any last words; he asked if he might pray. However instead of praying for himself, as his killers expected, he began to pray for them, instead; this so infuriated the militiamen that Breare lashed at the horse hitched to the buggy, leaving Sketoe dangling from the tree limb.

In their haste to carry out Sketoe's summary execution, Breare and his men failed to take their victim's size into account. Sketoe was tall, and his weight bent the limb to the point that his feet touched the ground. One of Breare's men dug a hole beneath the minister's feet, which allowed Sketoe to strangle to death before his friends could return. Sketoe was buried in nearby Mt. Carmel cemetery; his epitaph reads: "gone, but not forgotten".

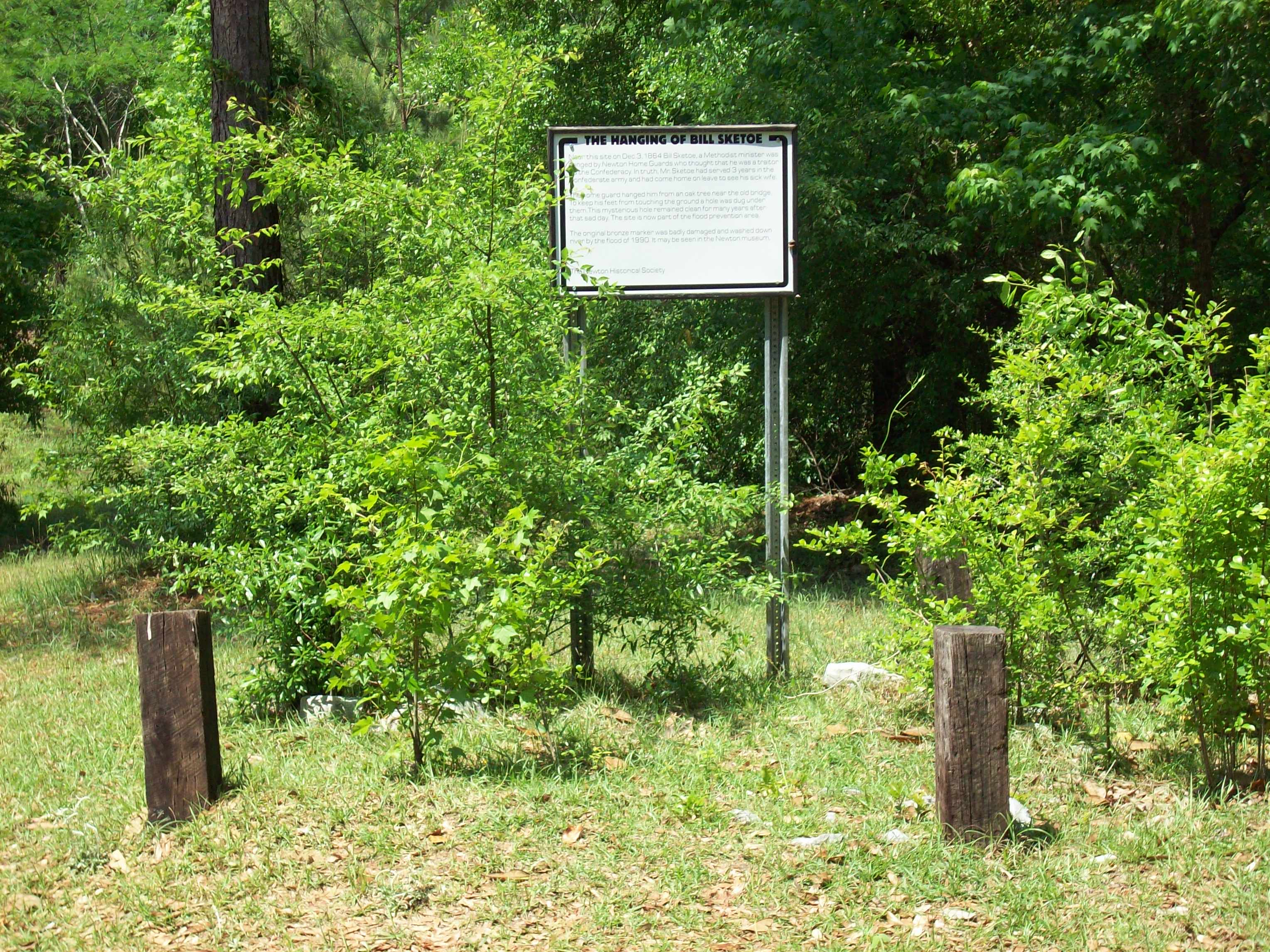
Monument to Bill Sketoe, constructed by the Newton historical society; this marker tells the "romantic" version of his story, one that has since been called into question by some historians.

The city museum in Newton preserves a cloak said to have belonged to Sketoe's wife, Sarah.

According to local histories, every member of Sketoe's lynching party died unnaturally, including Breare, who was struck by a limb from a post oak tree, the same kind from which Sketoe had been hanged.

== The hole ==
Sketoe's lynching created quite a stir in Newton, especially as locals began to notice that the hole dug to facilitate his hanging never seemed to disappear. It retained its original dimensions as years passed: about thirty inches wide by eight inches deep; even when filled with trash, dirt or debris, locals always returned—sometimes within hours—to find it empty. Campers claimed to have pitched their tents right over the hole after filling it with dirt, only to awaken the next morning to find it seemingly swept clean. All of this turned Sketoe's story into a legend, later immortalized in Windham's book, bringing numerous visitors to Newton to see "Sketoe's hole".

At least one local resident insisted on a completely natural explanation for the phenomena: Mary Fleming, who lived in Dale County after the war and saw the hole many times, asserted that Sketoe's friends, including one named Wash Reynolds, secretly kept it clean—all while insisting that some supernatural force was to blame. Reynolds adamantly denied this, insisting that he knew no more about what was going on at the hole than anyone else.

In 1979, a new highway bridge was constructed over the site of Sketoe's hanging; his hole found itself beneath the new span. In 1990, after flooding necessitated importation of rip-rap to strengthen the river bank, the cavity was covered with tons of rock. Although the hole itself is no longer visible, the site remains popular with visitors and researchers of the paranormal. In 2006, Sketoe family members joined Newton officials in dedicating a monument to their ancestor near the site of his death, which briefly relates details from Windham's account.

== See also ==
- Reportedly haunted locations in Alabama
