= Battle of Newton =

Battle of the American Civil War

Coordinates: 31°20′19.1″N 85°36′57.8″W

Battle of Newton, Alabama
- Part of American Civil War
Date	14 March 1865
Location	Newton, Alabama
Result	Confederate Home Guard victory

Belligerents
United States (Union)	(Confederate States of America) CSA (Confederacy)

Commanders and leaders
2LT Joseph G. Sanders; 1st Florida Cavalry Regiment (Union)	CPT Joseph Breare; CS Home Guard

Strength
44	~40

Casualties and losses
3 killed, 5 wounded	No casualties

The Battle of Newton was a minor skirmish that took place in the small town of Newton, Alabama, on 14 March 1865, during the final days of the U.S. Civil War. It was fought between local Home Guard troops and elements of the 1st Florida Cavalry (US), who had invaded the Wiregrass region of Alabama. This operation had not been approved by Brigadier General Alexander Asboth, commanding Union forces in Pensacola, Florida, and was in fact a violation of Ashboth's operational order.

The Federals were led by Second Lieutenant Joseph Sanders, a former captain in the Confederate Army who had switched sides and joined the Union Army. The Floridians intended to burn the Dale Countycourthouse, which was then located in Newton, just as other Union irregulars had done in nearby counties. However, their movement toward the town was detected by local citizens, and they were ambushed and routed on the town square by the home guard before they could do any damage. Sanders reported three dead and five wounded, while no casualties were reported among the home guard troops.

== Background ==
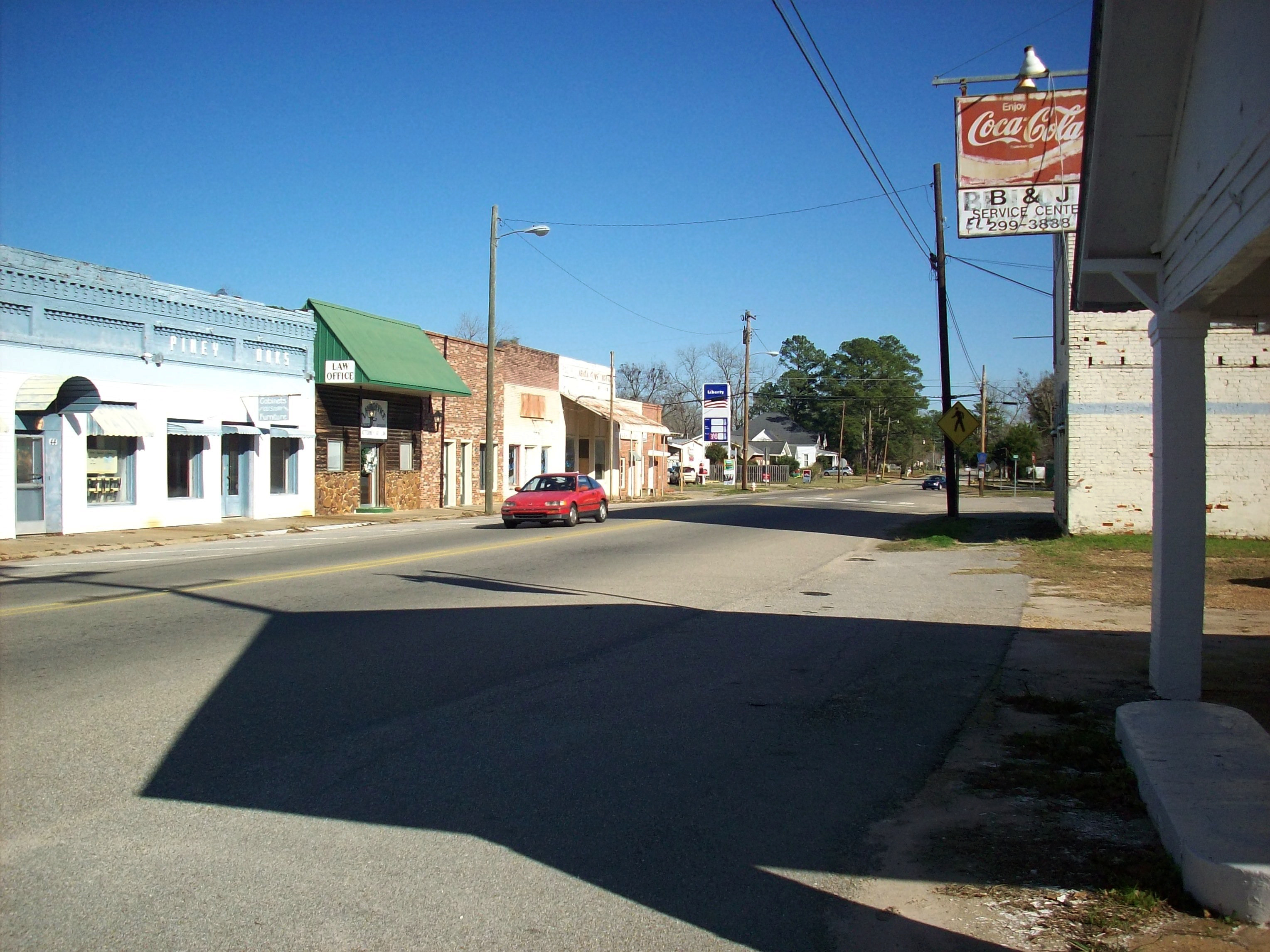
Newton, Alabama, in 2009. The old courthouse square sits just to the right of where this photo was taken.

An area of low population and minuscule economic importance in Antebellum Alabama, Dale County had been relegated to the status of a backwater during the Civil War era, largely neglected by the state government in Montgomery. Mostly covered by pine forest and with few big farms or plantations, the area proved an attractive gathering place for Confederate deserters, as well as Southern Unionists who had been harassed or worse by their "Secessh" neighbors. These "bushwackers", as they were called, hid out in the forests of Dale and adjacent counties, sometimes seeking aid and supplies from Federal forces in Pensacola. More often than not, however, they simply seized them from the largely-defenseless locals.

One "bushwacker" leader was Joseph G. Sanders, a millwright and resident of Dale County who had first served as a private in the 31st Georgia Infantry before being elected captain of Company C in that regiment. In 1864 Sanders had resigned his commission; facing the possibility of being drafted to fight for the South as a private, he chose to go over to the Union side, where he was commissioned as a second lieutenant and assigned to Company F, 1st Regiment of Florida Cavalry (US). Sanders' outfit attracted not just Confederate deserters and local Unionists, but also outright criminals and other less-than-desirable elements as well.

In the late winter of 1865, Brigadier General Alexander Asboth, commanding Federal forces in the Florida Panhandle, ordered Sanders to make a raid into Washington County, Florida His main mission was to raise recruits for the Federal Army at East Pass on Santa Rosa Island, as well as to "confiscate" horses and cattle belonging to "Rebels" in that area of Florida.

Instead of carrying out his orders, however, Sanders and his men made their way into the Forks of the Creek swamp near Campbellton, where they waited for a chance to attack Newton and burn the courthouse there. This courthouse contained records of Sanders' previous service with the Confederate Army. The courthouse at Elba in adjacent Coffee County had already been torched by bushwackers under the leadership of "Speckled" John Ward, and Sanders hoped to repeat their escapade in Newton. Accordingly, he set out for there on the night of 14 March 1865. Newton was also the location of the local Confederate conscription office, staffed at the time by Captain Joseph Breare, a former officer with the 15th Alabama Infantry who had been wounded at Gettysburg and returned home to lead efforts against local draft-dodgers and deserters. This made it an even more tempting target for Sanders, who was seen as a traitor by the citizens of Dale County.

== Battle ==
Unbeknownst to Sanders, he and his men had been spotted on the roads leading toward Newton, and their probable destination had been guessed. Jesse Carmichael, a veteran of the 15th Alabama who had served as a corporal and lost a hand at Antietam, was notified by his father of Sanders' impending arrival in Newton that night, and he in turn hastened to warn the town. As the citizens formed up to defend their village, Carmichael and another wounded veteran of the 15th, John McEntyre, rode some distance outside of town, to provide an early warning of Sanders' arrival. Spotting Sanders at the head of a mounted company of 44 men, Carmichael quickly rode back to Newton, where he led his neighbors to an ambush site he had chosen near a spring a mile east of town. He now headed out on another reconnaissance mission, after which these men abandoned the ambush site and returned to Newton, fearful for the safety of their families.

Meanwhile, Breare and his home guard unit had mustered in Newton. Upon hearing what was happening, he immediately took charge of the town's defense. Breare wanted to keep the defenders close to the square, so that they might surprise Sanders and catch him amidst Newton's buildings and streets, leaving him less room to maneuver. Accordingly, he formed his men on the west side of the square, opposite the direction that Carmichael believed that Sanders would be coming.

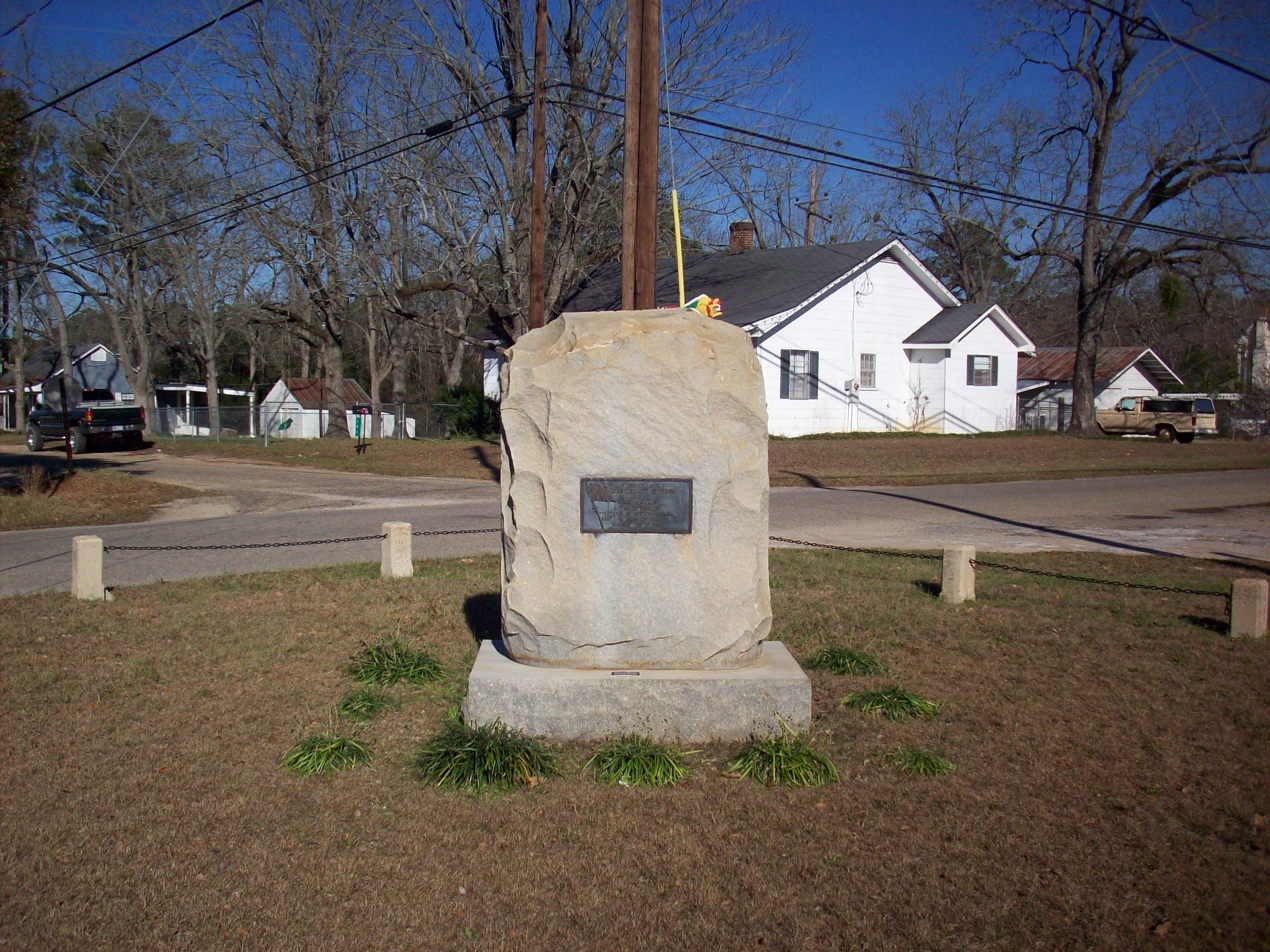
Civil War Monument in Newton. Located just south of the battle site.

Disagreeing with Breare's approach, and unable to dissuade him from this course of action, Carmichael took nine of his friends and arranged them to the east of the square: Carmichael and three of the men took up positions near a hotel, while the other six formed up further down in a side street between the hotel and the square. Sanders and his company rode into Newton from the southeast at full gallop, yelling "huzzah, huzzah; here we are!" and heading for the courthouse. Carmichael and his outfit let them pass, then opened up on them from behind with double-barrelled shotguns and rifles while their friends up ahead simultaneously fired into the front of Sanders' column. Thoroughly alarmed by this unexpected development, and hampered by malfunctioning pistols and rifles, the attackers bolted for the edge of town and rode off into the night. A one-handed ex-corporal and his nine friends had routed a Union cavalry force four times their size—on foot and in the dark. Not one of Carmichael's men was hurt or killed, while Breare's men on the other side of the square never got off a shot. Sanders, for his part, reported three dead and five wounded among his troops.

== Aftermath ==
Sanders' actions in Alabama became the subject of an investigation in June 1865 when he returned to Pensacola after a four-month absence. He had been given fourteen days for his mission, and when he returned after four months with only eight men out of the twenty he started with, the Army demanded to know why. Sanders' claimed that sore feet, floodwaters, "700 Rebels" and lack of forage for his horses had all combined to force him to hide in the swamp for four months despite numerous attempts (he claimed) to get back to Pensacola. No mention whatsoever was made of Sanders' unsuccessful attack on Newton, or any of the other alleged depredations committed by his men against local civilians during this time. This seems to have satisfied his superiors, for no court-martial ensued. Sanders was permitted to resign at his own request and "for the good of the service" on 13 September 1865 after saying that he feared for the safety and welfare of his family (who were living in Dale County at the time). Sanders returned to Alabama after leaving the army. Several citizens of Newton attempted to arrest him at his home, but were repulsed with one of them being killed in the process. He fled to Decatur County, Georgia, where his victim's father allegedly tracked him down and killed him.

Though completely unimportant in terms of the war as a whole, the home guard's victory at Newton gave hope to local citizens who had suffered much at the hands of raiders like Sanders and Ward. The town later constructed a monument to those citizens who defended it that evening, which can be seen adjacent to the square (now minus the courthouse; the county seat was moved to nearby Ozark in 1870).

In recent years, the battle has become an item of immense local interest, with an annual festival and reenactment on the third weekend of October.
