= Joseph G. Sanders =

American army officer

- Born: 1828; Dale County, Alabama
- Died: circa 1866 (aged 37–38); DeKalb County, Georgia
- Military career
- Allegiance: Confederate States of America; United States of America
- Branch: Confederate States Army; United States Army
- Service years: 1861–64 (CSA); 1864–65 (USA)
- Rank: Captain (CSA); Second Lieutenant (US)
- Units: 31st Georgia Volunteer Infantry; 1st Florida Cavalry (US)
- Conflicts: CSA: Seven Days Battle; Second Battle of Bull Run; Battle of Antietam; Battle of Gettysburg; USA: Battle of Newton (Alabama)
- Other work: Millwright

Joseph G. Sanders (1828 – c. 1866) was a soldier from the U.S. state of Alabama who served as a commissioned officer in both the Confederate and Union armies during the U.S. Civil War. After initially joining the 31st Georgia Infantry Regiment as a private in 1861, he was elected captain of Company C in that regiment a year later, fighting for the South until he resigned his commission in January 1864 and returned to Alabama, claiming ill health.

Once he had returned home, Sanders switched sides and joined the 1st Florida Cavalry Regiment (Union), where he obtained a provisional commission as a Second Lieutenant in F Company of that regiment. While it was not unprecedented for soldiers of one side to enlist in the army of the other, it was virtually unheard-of for an officer of one force to be commissioned in the other, once the war had begun.

Quickly establishing a reputation as a local "bushwacker," Sanders wreaked havoc with local 'Rebel' civilians—many of whom were his own neighbors—who accused him of stealing their horses, cattle and other possessions in contradiction of the laws of war. Sent on a recruiting mission in early 1865 into the Florida interior by his superior Brigadier General Alexander Asboth, Sanders disobeyed his orders and spent four months in the Forks of the Creek Swamp near Campbellton, Florida, from which he emerged on 14 March to attack the southern Alabama town of Newton. Defeated by local militiamen, Sanders returned to Federal lines where he managed to talk his way out of a court-martial and was permitted to resign his commission, after being characterized by Asboth as "grossly negligent" and "incompetent."

After killing a citizen of Newton who was part of a posse sent to arrest him, Sanders fled to DeKalb County, Georgia, where his victim's father is alleged to have hunted him down and killed him.

== Early life and enlistment in 31st Georgia ==
Prior to the Civil War, Sanders worked as a millwright in rural Dale County, Alabama, where he was apparently well thought of by his neighbors. Upon the outbreak of the Civil War, he enlisted in Company C of the 31st Georgia Infantry (known as "Captain Archer Griffith's Company of Mitchell Guards") on 9 October 1861, in Glennville, Alabama. Initially enlisting for twelve months, he re-enlisted in his same regiment on 13 April 1862 for "two years, or the war," by which time he held the rank of Third Sergeant in his unit and was paid a $50 bonus for signing on again. He was also given a forty-day furlough.

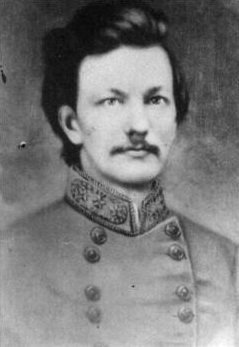
Colonel Clement A. Evans, Sanders' regimental commander during his Confederate service.

Sanders' regiment was commanded by then-colonel Clement A. Evans, who would later play a role in Sanders' resignation from Confederate service.

== Confederate service ==
=== Commissioning and record ===
On 13 May 1862, Sgt. Sanders was elected to be the captain and commander of his company. He participated with his regiment in the Seven Days Battle, the Second Battle of Bull Run and the Battle of Antietam, where he was wounded and was subsequently absent sick for 31 days in December 1862. Returning to his unit in January 1863, he accompanied them to Port Royal, Virginia, where he continued to serve until 20 July 1863 (just after the Battle of Gettysburg), when his health allegedly began to fail. Accordingly, he requested and obtained a medical furlough to return to his home in Dale County, which was granted on 9 October.

=== Resignation from Confederate service ===
Upon his return to Alabama, Sanders began work on a gristmill, which was welcomed by his neighbors as their area was described a being "quite destitute of mills." Accordingly, they drew up a petition to Jefferson Davis, president of the Confederacy, to ask that Sanders be allowed to resign his commission and remain at his home. Insisting that he was "patriotic and loyal," and that "only his ill health and shattered constitution keeps him away from his command," the signers earnestly pleaded that Davis approve Sanders' resignation from military service. Thirty-two citizens of Dale County signed the petition, including the Probate Judge, Daniel Carmichael, whose son Jesse had served as a corporal in the 15th Alabama Infantry, losing a hand at Antietam. Ironically, Jesse Carmichael would later play a pivotal role in Sanders' defeat when Sanders attacked his own hometown in March 1865—this time, while wearing the uniform of a Federal officer.

Captain Sanders' resignation was forwarded to his regimental commander, Colonel Evans, who recommended its approval:

The acceptance of this resignation is earnestly recommended. Knowing Captain Sanders thoroughly, I can safely assert that the service will be greatly benefitted by his being removed from his present position. The 1st Lieutenant of the Company is a good officer, in every way competent to hold the Captaincy. It is thought that, perhaps, Captain Sanders may render more material service to the Confederate States, by resuming his former occupation. It is therefore hoped that he will be permitted to return to his home.

Generals Jubal Early (Sanders' division commander) and Richard S. Ewell (his corps commander) concurred, and Sanders' resignation took effect on 29 January 1864.

== Federal service ==
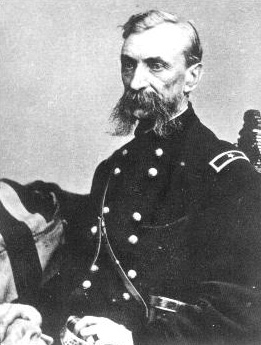
Brig. General Alexander Asboth, commanding U.S. forces in the Pensacola area.

=== Switching sides ===
No one knows for certain exactly what happened between 29 January and 5 July 1864, but for some reason, Joseph Sanders decided to do the unthinkable: not only did he switch sides and join the Federals, but he chose to accept an officer's commission, to boot. He was granted a provisional commission as a Second Lieutenant by Major General Nathaniel P. Banks on 5 July 1864, which he received on 17 July 1864 with orders to report for duty with Company F of the First Florida Cavalry (US) on 23 August, when the regiment was mustered in for Federal service in Florida. Sanders accordingly presented himself at the U.S. outpost at Barrancas, Florida, where he enrolled for a term of three years.

Sanders' Federal records indicate that he was commissioned "from civil life;" no mention is made anywhere in his U.S. file of his former Confederate service. Local histories insist that prior to obtaining this new commission, Sanders was facing conscription back into the Southern army; furthermore, say they, he had already become the leader of a local gang of deserters and Unionists who had begun to terrorize the citizens of lower Alabama.—many of whom had been his own friends and neighbors. "He was known to be a brave man," wrote Jesse Carmichael; "and as a result, his incursions into the county, and they were frequent, were very much dreaded."

=== Raid on Newton ===
Sanders' service with the 1st Florida Cavalry seems to have gone reasonably well until 25 February 1865, when he was ordered to take twenty men and proceed to the East Pass at Santa Rosa Island, where he was to recruit new soldiers for his regiment, as well as 'confiscate' cattle and horses belonging to 'Rebel' civilians in nearby Walton and Holmes counties. He was given fourteen days to perform this mission, after which he was ordered to return to Pensacola. Sanders had performed this duty the previous September, soon after joining his regiment.

But instead of obeying this directive, Sanders and his men made their way into the Forks of the Creek Swamp near Campbellton, where they hid out and waited for an opportunity to attack the small town of Newton, which was then the county seat of Dale County. Sanders knew that the courthouse there contained records of his former Confederate service (and those of other men in his unit), and he apparently wished to destroy them. He and his men accordingly set out for Newton on the evening of 14 March 1865, but their movement was detected, and the citizens of the town were given advance warning. Jesse Carmichael, the one-handed veteran whose father had attested the petition sent to Jefferson Davis on Sanders' behalf the previous Autumn, quickly organized the local Home Guard to oppose his one-time neighbor.

Though Captain Joseph Breare—the Home Guard commander—attempted to take charge of the town's defense, Carmichael defied his orders to gather on the west side of the courthouse square, and instead posted himself and nine friends east of the square, where they ambushed Sanders and his troop as they rode into town. Opening up on them simultaneously in the darkness from in front and behind, the ten Newtonians managed to scare Sanders' men bad enough that they bolted for the edge of town and rode off into the night. The courthouse at Newton was saved, and though completely unimportant in the larger scheme of things, Carmichael and his men could still claim that they'd whipped a 'Yankee' outfit four times their size.

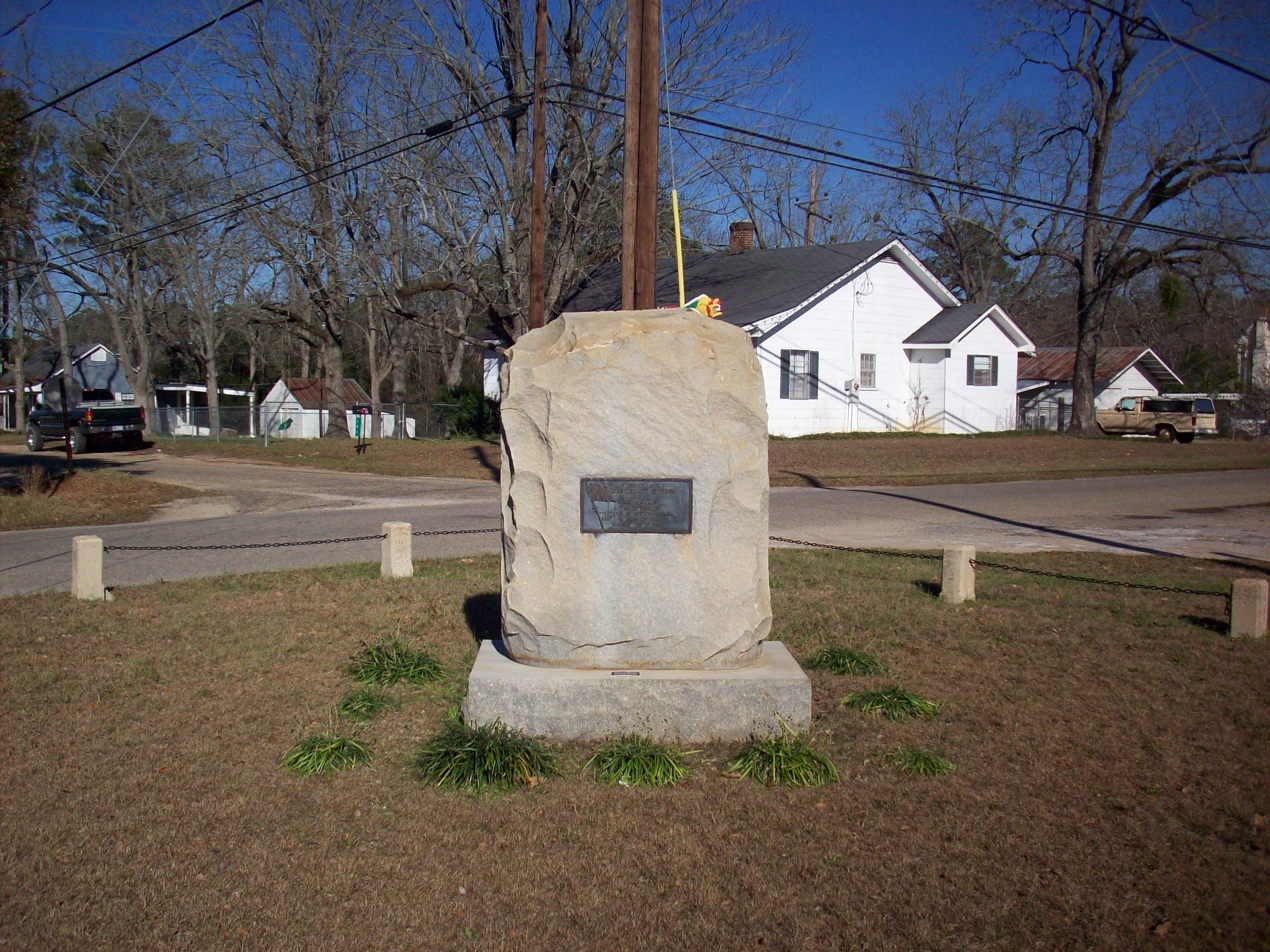
Civil War Monument in Newton. Located just south of the battle site.

=== Return to Pensacola and resignation ===
Having been absent without leave for four months by the time he returned to Pensacola—and with only eight men—in June 1865, Sanders found himself accused of desertion from the Federal Army, a capital offense. He was equally accused of having "become a terror to the people of west Florida" with his "armed gang of deserters." Asked to explain himself, Sanders ingeniously asserted that sore feet, sickness among his troops, an alleged enemy force of "700 Rebels", lack of provider and rising floodwaters all conspired to keep him from returning to Pensacola at the time specified in his orders. Unable to disprove his statements, the investigators were left with no choice but to exonerate him.

On 20 July 1865, Joseph Sanders resigned his commission in the U.S. Army, citing concerns for the welfare and safety of his family, who were still living in Dale County. As had happened previously when he resigned his Confederate commission, Sanders' request to leave the service was endorsed by his superiors. Sanders' resignation took effect on 13 September 1865, with the discharge granted "for the good of the service."

Brig. General Asboth, in making his final recommendation for approval, made this statement:

In consideration of the mitigating circumstances and the fact that several other statements given by citizens and soldiers relative to Lt. Sanders' prolonged absence involve no criminality, but show gross neglect and incompetency to fill a position as a commissioned officer, I thought it best to recommend the acceptance of his resignation for the good of the service.

.

== Death ==
After the war, according to Jessie Carmichael, Joseph Sanders returned to Dale County. Several local citizens, including a man named George Echol, tried to arrest Sanders at his home, "doubtless underrating his courage," Carmichael wrote. Having previously warned them against making any such attempts, Sanders shot and killed Echol, and the would-be posse dispersed. Fleeing to Decatur County, Georgia, Sanders built a mill and seemed to have escaped his enemies, until he was murdered there sometime after the war—allegedly, by Echol's father, another Dale County judge.

== See also ==
Frank Crawford Armstrong - Confederate General who led a Federal unit at the First Battle of Bull Run, then switched sides to fight for the South.
