= Murders of J.B. Beasley and Tracie Hawlett =

1999 double murder in Alabama, US

- High school portrait of Beasley (left) and Hawlett
- Location: 31.4525°N 85.6278°W; 323 Herring Avenue, Ozark, Alabama, U.S.
- Date: July 31 – August 1, 1999
- Attack type: Double-murder, child murder, shooting, rape
- Victims: J.B. Beasley; Tracie Hawlett
- Perpetrator: Coley McCraney
- Charges: Capital murder-vehicle (x2); Capital murder-rape; Capital murder of two
- Verdict: Guilty of all charges
- Sentence: Life imprisonment without the possibility of parole
- Judge: William “Bill” Filmore

The murders of J.B. Beasley and Tracie Hawlett were a double child murder that occurred in Ozark, Alabama, on August 1, 1999, in which two high school students named J.B Beasley and Tracie Hawlett—both 17—from Dothan, Alabama, disappeared after leaving their homes to celebrate Beasley's birthday on July 31, 1999. The next day, authorities found the girls' bodies in the trunk of Beasley's car in Ozark. Beasley and Hawlett died from a gunshot to the head. DNA was found in Beasley's underwear, leading police to believe she had been raped.

The double murder remained unsolved for 20 years, despite having DNA, as there was no match in the database. In August 2018, Ozark police department reached out to Parabon NanoLabs to solve the murders. In March 2019, 45-year-old Coley Lewis McCraney was arrested, and charged with four capital murder charges for the killings of Beasley and Hawlett.

McCraney was a truck driver and preacher with no criminal record who lived about a mile from the street where the girls' bodies were found. McCraney pleaded not guilty of all charges.

On April 26, 2023, the jury found McCraney guilty of all charges and sentenced him to life in prison without the possibility of parole. In July 2023, a Dale County Circuit judge denied McCraney's appeal for a new trial. He is currently serving his sentence at William E. Donaldson Correctional Facility.

The murders were considered by authors as a crime that "haunted" Ozark and the Wiregrass region. The murders made national headlines for years, the Ozark's police chief named the crime as one of the biggest cases in Alabama. The cases were profiled in America's Most Wanted, Haunting Evidence, On the Case with Paula Zahn, and other national programs.

== Victims ==
Beasley and Hawlett, both 17, were two Northview High School seniors at the time of the murders.

J.B. Hilton Green Beasley was born on July 31, 1982, in Troy, Alabama. Beasley was described by her family as a "full of energy girl who had a passion for dance". During junior high school, Beasley was member of Junior Honor Society, and the cheer squad, and participated in other extracurricular activities.

Tracie Jean Hawlett was born on March 3, 1982. Hawlett's father died when she was four.

== Murders ==
323 Herring Avenue, Ozark, Alabama

On July 31, 1999, J.B. Beasley turned 17 years old. That night, Beasley and her best friend from high school, Tracie Hawlett, decided to celebrate Beasley's birthday party in a nearby town. (Note: For years, various media reports stated that Beasley and Hawlett were going to a field party in Headland, Alabama. However, Hawlett's mother, Carol Roberts, claims that the girls were actually headed to a birthday party for Beasley in Midland City, Alabama.) The girls drove in a black 1993 Mazda 929, which was owned by the Beasley family. At some point, Beasley and Hawlett got lost and arrived at the Big Little Store, a convenience store and Chevron station at 763 East Broad Street (which is now an Inland gas station) in Ozark, Alabama. Hawlett's mother, Carol Roberts, said that around 11:35 p.m., her daughter called her from a pay phone. Hawlett told her that she and Beasley were lost, that they had asked for directions, and that they were on their way home.

The next day, Roberts discovered that her daughter had not returned home, so she reported her disappearance to the police. At the same time Beasley's parents reported their daughter missing. Authorities found Beasley's car in Herring Avenue along a road in Ozark, at the scene they found the girls' belongings. Inside the trunk of the car were the girls' bodies.

== Investigation ==
The girls died from a gunshot to the head. DNA was found in Beasley's underwear and clothes, leading police to believe she had been raped. No DNA was found on Hawlett's body.

The investigators conducted more than 500 interviews, and forensics experts tested the DNA of more than 70 potential suspects. The police department announced a nationwide, 24-hour hotline to receive tips for the murders and a reward of $15,000. Then-Alabama Governor Don Siegelman announced another $10,000 funds to augment the reward.

An Ozark resident said he knew information regarding the killings. He said a man had met the girls at the gas station and taken them into the woods. The police discovered that this was a false statement to claim the reward. A man from Michigan who allegedly confessed to the murders was investigated by police. His DNA did not match evidence found on Beasley's clothing.

The murders remained a cold case for 20 years until March 2019.

== Identification ==
In August 2018, Ozark police department reached out to Parabon NanoLabs, a company based in Reston, Virginia, to solve the murders of Beasley and Hawlett, after they identified the infamous Golden State Killer as Joseph James DeAngelo. The analysis found the identification of a man from Dothan named Coley Lewis McCraney, a 45-year-old truck driver with no criminal record. Genetic genealogist CeCe Moore said that one of McCraney's relatives voluntarily submitted DNA into a genealogy database called GEDmatch. That helped identify him as the killer.

McCraney born on October 18,1973. He is originally from Ozark, Alabama; he attended and graduated from Carroll High School in 1992, where he served as the president of the library club and was an athlete. He is a military veteran. He also created a nonprofit called Spirit and Truth Lifeline Ministries in 2013. McCraney lived about a mile from the street where the girls' bodies were found.

== Criminal proceedings ==
=== Pre-trial ===
In March 2019, McCraney was arrested, and charged with two counts of capital murder-vehicle, one count of capital murder-rape, and one count of capital murder of two for the killings of Beasley and Hawlett. McCraney pleaded not guilty of all charges.

=== Trial ===
The trial started in April 2023. McCraney was represented by defense attorney David Harrison, and Alabama Attorney General Steve Marshall represented the state.

At trial, McCraney confessed that he knew Beasley. A few weeks before the murders, he had a conversation with Beasley, in which she introduced herself as "Jennifer", at the Wiregrass Commons Mall. He testified that on the day of the murders, he and Beasley had consensual sexual relations in his truck. According to him, he never knew that "Jennifer" was J.B Beasley. Examiners could not determine whether Beasley was raped or not.

On April 26, 2023, the jury found McCraney guilty of all charges and sentenced him to life in prison without the possibility of parole.

In July 2023, a Dale County Circuit judge denied McCraney's appeal for a new trial. In 2024, McCraney's defense attorney filed another motion with Alabama's Court of Criminal Appeals. McCraney is currently serving his sentence at William E. Donaldson Correctional Facility.

== Reactions ==
The murders were considered a case that "haunted" the Ozark community and the Wiregrass region. Chief Marlos Walker of the police department said that the killings were one of the biggest cases in Alabama, and the case was covered by local and national media over the years.

In the area where the bodies were found, the girls' family and friends erected a memorial for them.

== In the media ==
=== Television ===
- In August 2000, the case was featured in America's Most Wanted.
- In August 2007, the case was featured in the Haunting Evidence episode "Wiregrass Murders".
- In March 2024, the case was featured in On the Case with Paula Zahn episode "Wrong Place, Wrong Time".
- On May 10, 2024, the case was featured on ABC's 20^{20} in an episode titled "Forever 17".
- In July 2024, the case was featured in Sins of the South episode "Abducted in Alabama".

== See also ==
- Cold case
- Crime in Alabama
- List of solved missing person cases: 1950–1999
- Parabon NanoLabs
