= Tarver =

Tarver is a surname. Notable people with the surname include:

- Antonio Tarver (born 1968), American boxer
- Clay Tarver (born 1965), American guitarist and writer
- Ed Tarver (1959–2024), American attorney and politician
- H. Micheal Tarver (born 1958), American author, historian, and professor
- Jason Tarver (born 1974), American football coach
- John Tarver (born 1949), American football player
- Hurley Tarver (born 1975), American football player
- Katelyn Tarver (born 1989), American actress and singer
- La Schelle Tarver (born 1959), American baseball player
- Malcolm C. Tarver (1885–1960), U.S. Representative from Georgia
- Mary Tarver Carroll (1885–1955), American writer and clubwoman
- Quindon Tarver (1982–2021), African-American singer
- Ray Tarver (1921–1972), American dentist and politician
