= Oates–Reynolds Memorial Building =

- U.S. National Register of Historic Places
- Location within Alabama Location within the United States
- Location: Oates St., Newton, Alabama
- Coordinates: 31°19′51″N 85°35′46″W
- Area: 1 acre (0.40 ha)
- Built: 1922
- NRHP reference No.: 74000409
- Added to NRHP: June 13, 1974

The Oates–Reynolds Memorial Building (also known as the Girls' Dormitory of the Baptist Collegiate Institute) is a historic building in Newton, Alabama, United States. The Baptist Collegiate Institute was founded in 1898, providing elementary, high school, and early college education. One of the oldest educational institutions in the Wiregrass Region, the school had over 250 students by 1918. The entire campus burned in the early 1920s, and a classroom building and girls' dormitory were built to replace it. The Institute closed in 1929; the classroom building was taken over by the public school system, and the dormitory was rented out. The dormitory currently serves as the town library and museum.

The building was constructed in Classical Revival style. The structure is built of brick and masonry, and consists of a front portion with gables on three sides and a rear wing which contained the dormitory rooms. The building contains 36 rooms, 18 on each floor, including the first floor lobby and a bath and storage area on the second floor. The front of the building is anchored by four large columns supporting a two-story portico.

The building was listed on the National Register of Historic Places in 1974.
