= Bookhouse =

Bookhouse may refer to:

- A repository for books
- The Book House for Children, a 6-volume children's book set edited by Olive Beaupre Miller, which began publication in 1921.
