= Newton, Alabama =

- Town
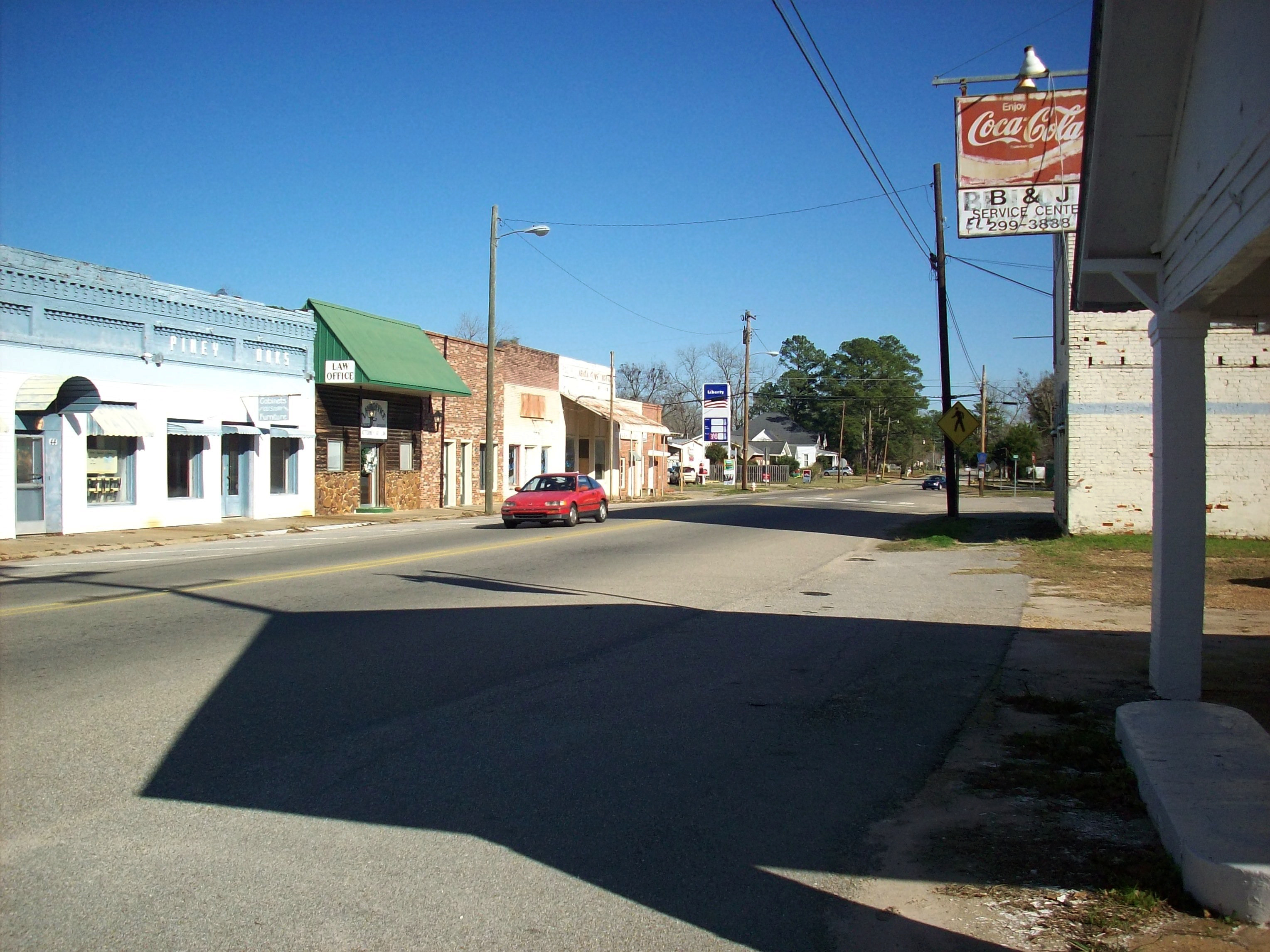
- Downtown Newton, Alabama

- Location of Newton in Dale County, Alabama.
- Coordinates: 31°21′43″N 85°34′53″W
- Country: United States
- State: Alabama
- County: Dale

Area
  - Total: 14.28 sq mi (36.98 km^{2})
  - Land: 14.25 sq mi (36.90 km^{2})
  - Water: 0.027 sq mi (0.07 km^{2})
- Elevation: 200 ft (61 m)

Population (2020)
  - Total: 1,607
  - Density: 112.8/sq mi (43.55/km^{2})
- Time zone: UTC-6 (Central (CST))
  - Summer (DST): UTC-5 (CDT)
- ZIP code: 36352
- Area code: 334
- FIPS code: 01-54480
- GNIS feature ID: 2406989

Newton is a town in Dale County, Alabama, United States. As of the 2020 census, Newton had a population of 1,607. Once the county seat of Dale County, Newton lost this distinction to nearby Ozark in 1870, and is now a small farming community. It incorporated in 1887. The city currently forms a part of the Ozark micropolitan statistical area.

== Geography ==
According to the U.S. Census Bureau, the town has a total area of 14.3 square miles (37 km^{2}), of which 14.3 square miles (37 km^{2}) is land and 0.04 square miles (0.10 km^{2}) (0.21%) is water.

The Choctawhatchee River flows just to the north and west of Newton. At one time this waterway was navigable by steamboat from its mouth in Choctawhatchee Bay, Florida all the way to Newton.

Alabama State Route 123 and Alabama State Route 134 both pass through Newton.

== History ==
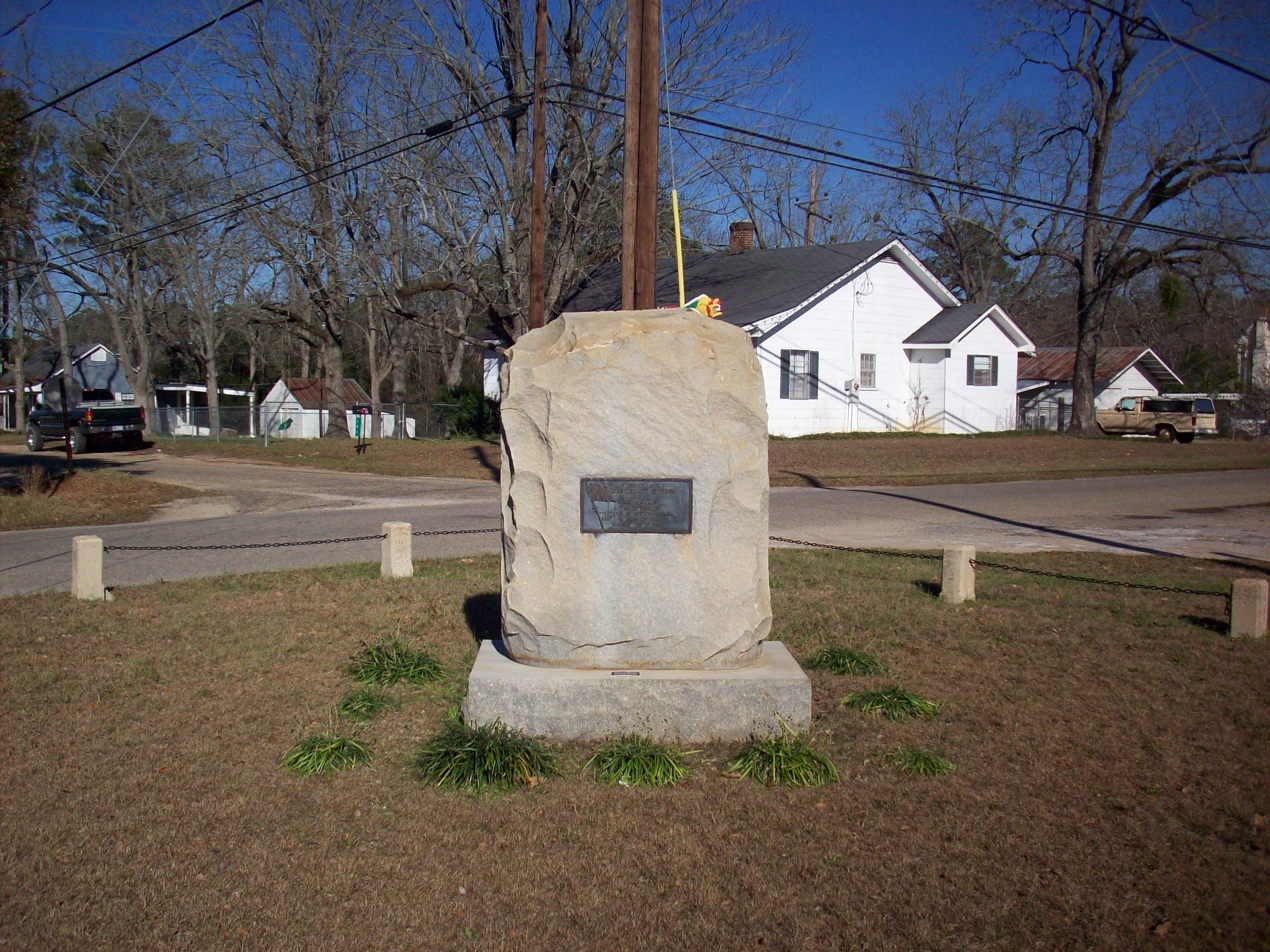
Civil War Monument in Newton, Alabama

Newton was founded in 1843 after the formation of Coffee County from Dale County's western half, which rendered the original county seat of Daleville off-center. The town was a scene for Confederate recruiting during the Civil War, and was the site of a battle in March 1865 between local Home Guard troops and elements of the 1st Florida Cavalry (US) operating out of Florida. The Federals were led by Joseph Sanders, a Dale County resident who had previously been a captain in the 31st Georgia Infantry, but had later switched sides and joined the Federals. Seeking to burn the county courthouse, the attackers were repulsed when local troops ambushed their column as they entered the town. This event is commemorated by a monument located in downtown Newton, and by annual re-enactments.

On December 3, 1864, a local Methodist minister named Bill Sketoe was lynched just north of Newton by local Home Guardsmen led by Captain Joseph Brear. Since Sketoe was tall, a hole had to be dug beneath his feet to accommodate his large frame. Local legend insists that "the hole that won't stay filled" never vanished—even after being filled in numerous times during the years that followed. Though covered in 1979 by a new bridge and tons of rip-rap, "Sketoe's hole" remains a local attraction, and was documented by Alabama writer Kathryn Tucker Windham in 13 Alabama Ghosts and Jeffrey. A monument to Sketoe was dedicated near the hanging site in 2006, and the local museum displays items of Sketoe memorabilia.

Following a fire which destroyed the courthouse in March 1869, and the formation of Geneva County in 1870 from the southern third of Dale and Coffee Counties, voters relocated the county seat to Ozark, which was more centralized.

The Southern Star, one of the oldest newspapers in the Wiregrass area, was first published in Newton in 1867. It later relocated to Ozark, where it continues to be published today. Newton remained a port for river boats on the nearby Choctawhatchee, until the railroad arrived in 1890. The Baptist Collegiate Institute operated in the city from 1898 to 1929; its main building now houses the city's public library.

== Demographics ==
Historical population
Census	Pop.	Note	%±
1880	469		—
1890	520		10.9%
1900	457		−12.1%
1910	524		14.7%
1920	680		29.8%
1930	661		−2.8%
1940	616		−6.8%
1950	745		20.9%
1960	958		28.6%
1970	1,865		94.7%
1980	1,540		−17.4%
1990	1,580		2.6%
2000	1,708		8.1%
2010	1,511		−11.5%
2020	1,607		6.4%
U.S. Decennial Census; 2013 Estimate

=== 2020 census ===
Newton racial composition
Race	Num.	Perc.
White (non-Hispanic)	1,282	79.78%
Black or African American (non-Hispanic)	182	11.33%
Native American	6	0.37%
Asian	8	0.5%
Pacific Islander	2	0.12%
Other/Mixed	76	4.73%
Hispanic or Latino	51	3.17%

As of the 2020 census, Newton had a population of 1,607. The median age was 44.5 years. 22.4% of residents were under the age of 18 and 22.2% were 65 years of age or older. For every 100 females there were 100.1 males, and for every 100 females age 18 and over there were 87.8 males age 18 and over.

0.0% of residents lived in urban areas, while 100.0% lived in rural areas.

There were 651 households in Newton, and there were 479 families residing in the town. Of all households, 30.6% had children under the age of 18 living in them. Of all households, 49.3% were married-couple households, 18.6% were households with a male householder and no spouse or partner present, and 27.0% were households with a female householder and no spouse or partner present. About 27.9% of all households were made up of individuals and 15.5% had someone living alone who was 65 years of age or older.

There were 734 housing units, of which 11.3% were vacant. The homeowner vacancy rate was 3.0% and the rental vacancy rate was 7.3%.

=== 2010 census ===
As of the census of 2010, there were 1,511 people, 650 households, and 439 families residing in the town. The population density was 105.7 inhabitants per square mile (40.8/km^{2}). There were 738 housing units at an average density of 51.6 per square mile (19.9/km^{2}). The racial makeup of the town was 83.6% White, 13.0% Black or African American, 0.7% Native American, 0.5% Asian, 0.2% Pacific Islander, 0.0% from other races, and 2.1% from two or more races. 1.5% of the population were Hispanic or Latino of any race.

There were 650 households, out of which 23.2% had children under the age of 18 living with them, 50.5% were married couples living together, 13.1% had a female householder with no husband present, and 32.5% were non-families. 29.2% of all households were made up of individuals, and 12.5% had someone living alone who was 65 years of age or older. The average household size was 2.32 and the average family size was 2.84.

In the town, the population was spread out, with 20.3% under the age of 18, 8.1% from 18 to 24, 22.6% from 25 to 44, 32.6% from 45 to 64, and 16.4% who were 65 years of age or older. The median age was 43.9 years. For every 100 females, there were 92.2 males. For every 100 females age 18 and over, there were 95.1 males.

The median income for a household in the town was $33,750, and the median income for a family was $47,019. Males had a median income of $43,021 versus $30,368 for females. The per capita income for the town was $21,781. About 9.2% of families and 14.4% of the population were below the poverty line, including 22.8% of those under age 18 and 5.7% of those age 65 or over.

=== 2000 census ===
As of the census of 2000, there were 1,708 people, 693 households, and 510 families residing in the town. The population density was 119.5 inhabitants per square mile (46.1/km^{2}). There were 790 housing units at an average density of 55.3 per square mile (21.4/km^{2}). The racial makeup of the town was 82.20% White, 15.52% Black or African American, 0.18% Native American, 0.06% Asian, 0.06% Pacific Islander, 0.06% from other races, and 1.93% from two or more races. 1.23% of the population were Hispanic or Latino of any race.

There were 693 households, out of which 31.7% had children under the age of 18 living with them, 56.6% were married couples living together, 13.3% had a female householder with no husband present, and 26.4% were non-families. 24.1% of all households were made up of individuals, and 9.4% had someone living alone who was 65 years of age or older. The average household size was 2.46 and the average family size was 2.93.

In the town, the population was spread out, with 24.0% under the age of 18, 8.9% from 18 to 24, 27.2% from 25 to 44, 25.8% from 45 to 64, and 14.1% who were 65 years of age or older. The median age was 39 years. For every 100 females, there were 93.9 males. For every 100 females age 18 and over, there were 89.8 males.

The median income for a household in the town was $33,021, and the median income for a family was $35,795. Males had a median income of $28,924 versus $19,559 for females. The per capita income for the town was $15,263. About 13.3% of families and 13.1% of the population were below the poverty line, including 17.8% of those under age 18 and 8.5% of those age 65 or over.

== Schools ==
Newton has its own Elementary School.

== See also ==
- Battle of Newton (Alabama)
