= Samuel Lawson Dowling House =

Historic house in Alabama, United States

- U.S. National Register of Historic Places
- Interactive map of Samuel Lawson Dowling House
- Location: 311 Owens St., Ozark, Alabama
- Built: 1870
- NRHP reference No.: 96000594
- Added to NRHP: May 30, 1996

The Samuel Lawson Dowling House is a historic residence in Ozark, Alabama, United States. Built in 1870, it was listed on the National Register of Historic Places in 1996.

== History ==
The house was built in 1870 by Samuel Lawson Dowling, whose family was one of the first groups to settle in Dale County, Alabama. Lawson's grandfather, Dempsey, was a Methodist minister who came to the Wiregrass Region from Darlington County, South Carolina, and helped found Claybank Church near Ozark. Samuel was a farmer, county treasurer, and construction contractor who built the first Methodist church in town. On his death in 1919, Samuel's daughter acquired the home, selling it only four months later. It has been owned by several families in the intervening years.

== Architecture ==
The house is similar in style to a Tidewater-type cottage, which was popular on the Atlantic coastal plain where many of Dale County's early settlers came from. Being built just before the railroad came to Ozark, it was one of the first architecturally styled homes in the area; most previous houses were log structures that emphasized function over form.

The single-story house is five bays wide, with a steeply pitched gable roof and exterior chimneys in the gable ends. A shallow porch covers the front door, which features a transom and sidelights, and a pair of six-over-one sash windows on either side of the door. The windows were originally six-over-six sashes, but were replaced around 1920. The interior is laid out in a center-hall plan, with two large rooms at the front of the house on either side of a hallway, and two smaller rooms behind. A two-room ell was added to the rear of the home around 1900.
