= 1st Florida Cavalry Regiment =

1st Florida Cavalry Regiment may refer to:

- 1st Florida Cavalry Regiment (Confederate)
- 1st Florida Cavalry Regiment (Union)

== See also ==
- 1st Florida Special Cavalry Battalion, a Confederate unit
