= Steve McLendon =

American football player (born 1986)

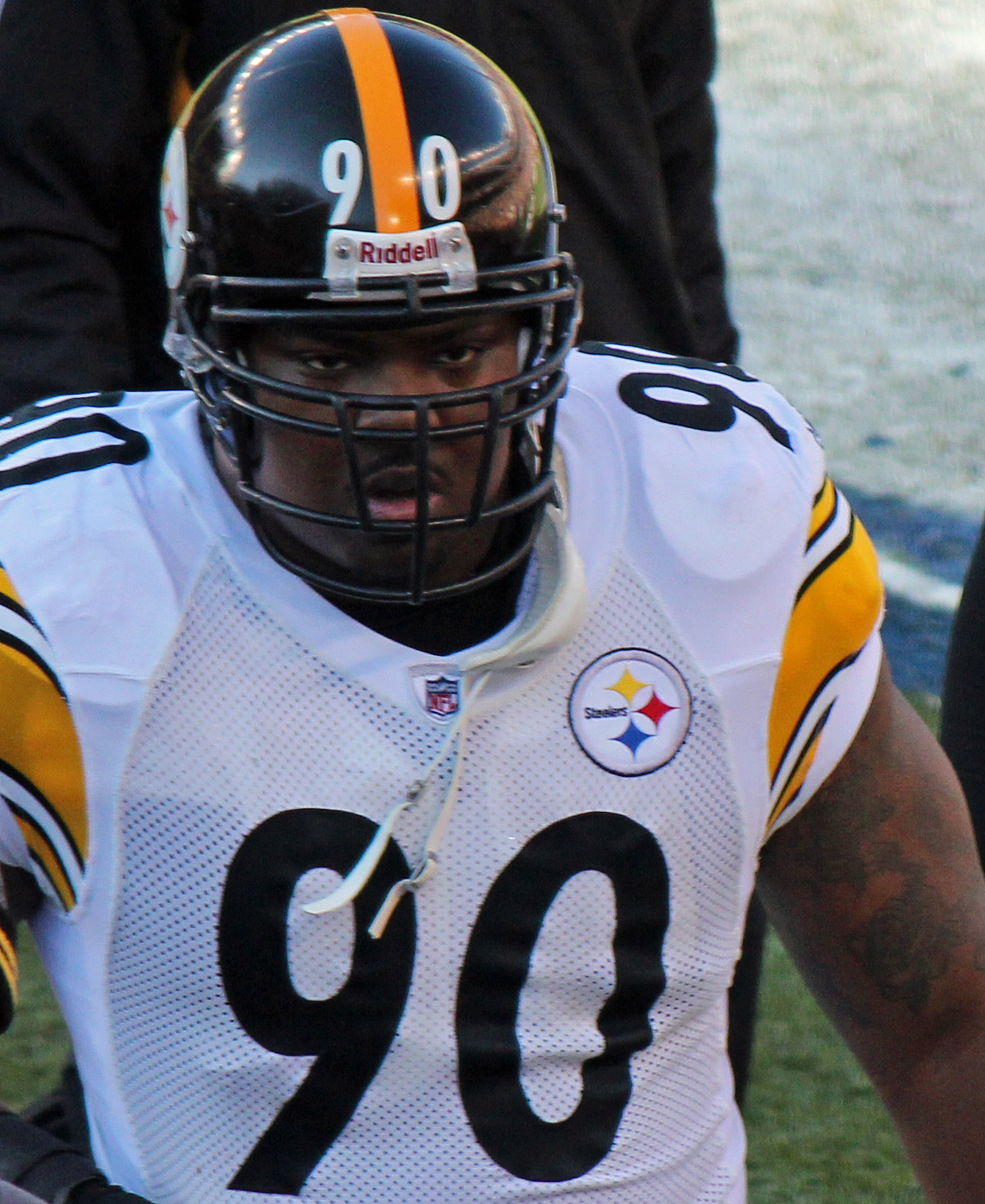
- McLendon with the Pittsburgh Steelers in 2012

No. 90, 99, 96
- Position: Nose tackle

Personal information
- Born: January 3, 1986 (age 40); Ozark, Alabama, U.S.
- Listed height: 6 ft 3 in (1.91 m)
- Listed weight: 310 lb (141 kg)

Career information
- High school: Carroll (Ozark)
- College: Troy
- NFL draft: 2009: undrafted

Career history
- Pittsburgh Steelers (2009–2015); New York Jets (2016–2020); Tampa Bay Buccaneers (2020–2021)

Awards and highlights
- Super Bowl champion (LV)

Career NFL statistics
- Total tackles: 276
- Sacks: 13
- Forced fumbles: 4
- Fumble recoveries: 2
- Pass deflections: 3
- Interceptions: 1
- Stats at Pro Football Reference

Stephen Craine McLendon (born January 3, 1986) is an American former professional football player who was a nose tackle in the National Football League (NFL). He was signed by the Pittsburgh Steelers as an undrafted free agent in 2009. He played college football for the Troy Trojans.

== Professional career ==
Pre-draft measurables
Height	Weight	40-yard dash	10-yard split	20-yard split	20-yard shuttle	Three-cone drill	Vertical jump	Broad jump	Bench press
6 ft 1 3/8 in (1.86 m)	306 lb (139 kg)	5.15 s	1.75 s	2.99 s	4.45 s	7.35 s	29.5 in (0.75 m)	8 ft 6 in (2.59 m)	31 reps
All values from Pro Day

=== Pittsburgh Steelers ===
McLendon was signed by the Steelers as an undrafted free agent on April 27, 2009. He was a final cut on September 5 but re-signed to the practice squad the next day. He was released on November 25 but re-signed on December 2. He was signed to a reserve/future contract on January 7, 2010.

McLendon was a final cut for the second straight season when he was waived on September 4, 2010. He was re-signed to the practice squad the following day. The Steelers signed McLendon to their active roster on September 18 and he appeared in their game at Tennessee. He recovered a fumble in that game and made one tackle. He was waived again on September 20 but re-signed to the practice squad on September 22. On October 2, quarterback Dennis Dixon was placed on injured reserve and McLendon was called up again. McLendon was waived on October 7 to make room for Ben Roethlisberger, who returned from his 4-game suspension. McLendon was re-signed to the Steelers' practice squad on October 11. McLendon was again signed to the active roster on October 30. He played in seven games for the entire season, recording one more tackle bringing his total tackles for the season to two. The Steelers finished the season with a 12–4 record to clinch the AFC North, and eventually reached Super Bowl XLV, only to lose to the Green Bay Packers 25–31.

In the 2011 season, McLendon appeared in a career high fourteen games. He totaled 13 tackles with one sack. For the 2012 season he played in all 16 games, registering seven tackles and two sacks. After the season, McLendon became a restricted free agent. McLendon visited with the Green Bay Packers before resigning with the Steelers for a three-year deal worth $7.25 million, including $1.675 million guaranteed. In the 2013 season, he appeared in 14 games with 33 tackles and a forced fumble. In 2014, he played in 12 games with 22 tackles and a sack. In 2015, he appeared in all 16 games for the first time of his career, finishing the year with 14 tackles and a sack.

=== New York Jets ===
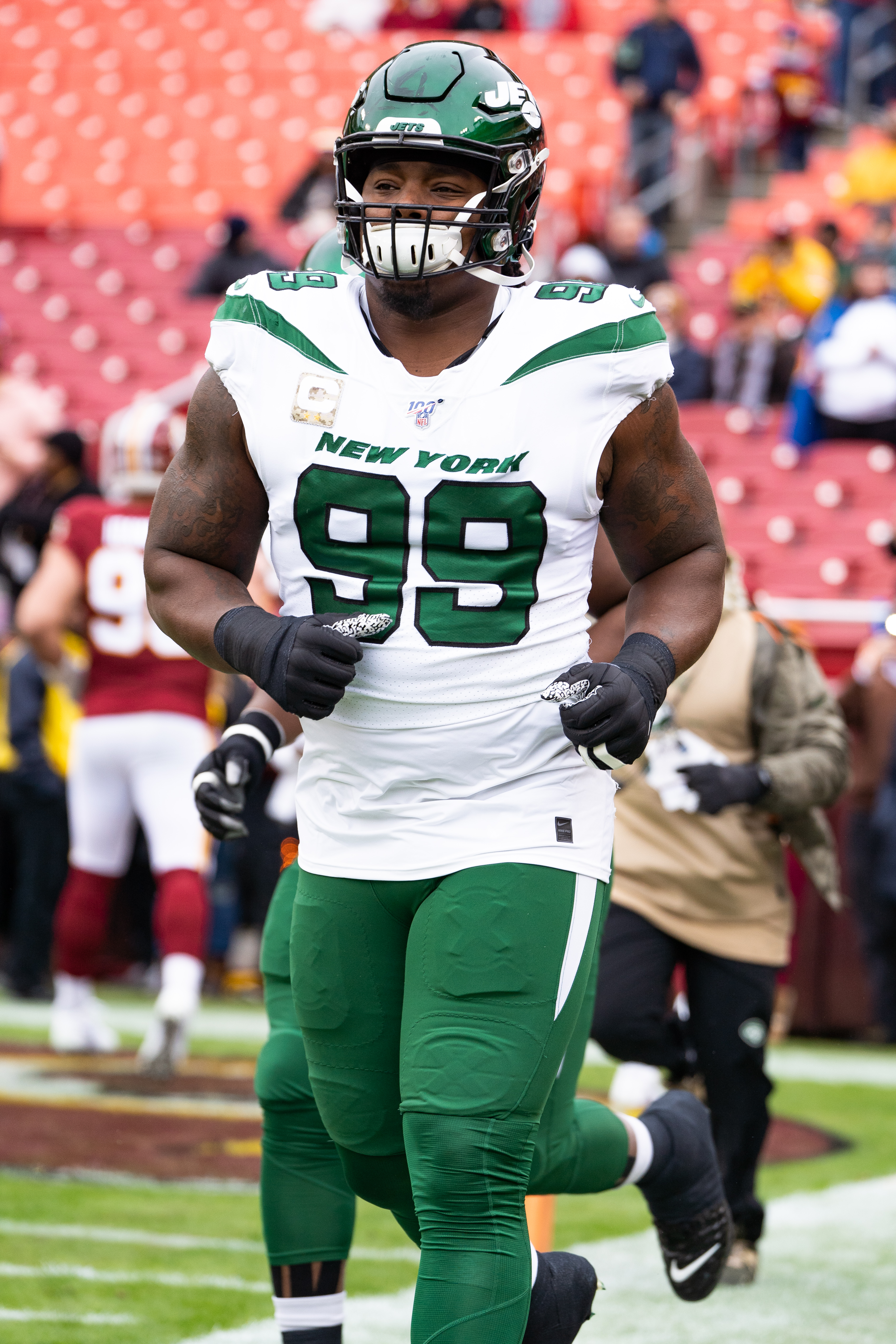
McLendon in a game against the Washington Redskins

On March 16, 2016, the New York Jets signed McLendon to a three-year, $12 million contract with $4 million guaranteed. Making his first start for the Jets on September 11, 2016, McLendon had tied a career high two sacks of the team's six sacks in the Week 1 loss against Cincinnati Bengals.

On March 14, 2019, McLendon re-signed with the Jets. He signed a one-year contract extension on October 12, 2019 through the 2020 season.

=== Tampa Bay Buccaneers ===
On October 18, 2020, McLendon and a 2023 seventh-round pick were traded to the Tampa Bay Buccaneers for a 2022 sixth-round pick. He was placed on the reserve/COVID-19 list by the Buccaneers on January 1, 2021, and activated on January 11. McLendon appeared in Super Bowl LV, where the Buccaneers defeated the Kansas City Chiefs by a score of 31–9.

McLendon re-signed with the Buccaneers on April 14, 2021. In a Monday Night Football game on November 22, 2021, McLendon recorded his first career interception after twelve seasons in the NFL, intercepting a pass from Daniel Jones of the New York Giants in the game's third quarter. He became the second-oldest player to record his first career NFL interception.

== NFL career statistics ==
Legend
**Bold**	Career high

=== Regular season ===
Year	Team	Games		Tackles					Interceptions					Fumbles			
Year	Team	GP	GS	Cmb	Solo	Ast	Sck	TFL	Int	Yds	TD	Lng	PD	FF	FR	Yds	TD
2010	PIT	7	0	2	2	0	0.0	0	0	0	0	0	0	0	**1**	0	0
2011	PIT	14	1	13	9	4	1.0	1	0	0	0	0	0	0	0	0	0
2012	PIT	**16**	0	7	4	3	2.0	2	0	0	0	0	0	**1**	0	0	0
2013	PIT	14	10	33	20	13	0.0	2	0	0	0	0	0	**1**	0	0	0
2014	PIT	12	11	21	12	9	1.0	4	0	0	0	0	0	0	0	0	0
2015	PIT	**16**	9	14	11	3	1.0	4	0	0	0	0	**1**	0	0	0	0
2016	NYJ	11	9	28	20	8	**3.5**	7	0	0	0	0	0	**1**	0	0	0
2017	NYJ	**16**	14	**46**	**30**	**16**	1.5	7	0	0	0	0	0	0	0	0	0
2018	NYJ	**16**	14	34	21	13	0.0	4	0	0	0	0	**1**	0	0	0	0
2019	NYJ	**16**	**16**	36	21	15	2.5	**10**	0	0	0	0	0	0	**1**	0	0
2020	NYJ	6	6	14	8	6	0.0	0	0	0	0	0	0	0	0	0	0
2020	TAM	9	0	17	7	10	0.0	2	0	0	0	0	0	0	0	0	0
2021	TAM	12	0	11	7	4	0.5	1	**1**	0	0	0	**1**	**1**	0	0	0
Career		165	90	276	172	104	13.0	44	1	0	0	0	3	4	2	0	0

=== Playoffs ===
Year	Team	Games		Tackles					Interceptions					Fumbles			
Year	Team	GP	GS	Cmb	Solo	Ast	Sck	TFL	Int	Yds	TD	Lng	PD	FF	FR	Yds	TD
2011	PIT	1	0	3	2	1	0.0	0	0	0	0	0	0	0	0	0	0
2014	PIT	1	**1**	1	0	1	0.0	0	0	0	0	0	0	0	0	0	0
2015	PIT	2	**1**	4	**4**	0	0.0	**1**	0	0	0	0	0	0	0	0	0
2020	TAM	**3**	0	**5**	2	**3**	0.0	0	0	0	0	0	0	0	0	0	0
2021	TAM	2	0	1	1	0	**1.0**	0	0	0	0	0	**1**	**1**	0	0	0
Career		9	2	14	9	5	1.0	1	0	0	0	0	1	1	0	0	0
