= Ozark City Schools =

School district in Alabama, United States

Ozark City Schools are based in Ozark, Alabama. They consist of Lisenby Elementary School, Mixon Elementary School, D. A. Smith Middle School, and Carroll High School.

It is also one of three municipal school systems that take on-post Fort Rucker families at the secondary level.
