= The Southern Star (Alabama) =

- Type: Weekly newspaper
- Founder(s): Joseph A. Adams
- Founded: 1867
- Headquarters: 373 Ed Lisenby Dr, Ozark, AL 36360
- Website: ozarkal.news

The Southern Star is the newspaper of Ozark, Alabama and one of the oldest newspapers in the Wiregrass region. It is a weekly publication and new editions are delivered every Thursday.

== History ==
The newspaper was founded in 1867 by Joseph A. Adams, a former Confederate soldier with no journalism experience, and was still owned by his descendants until November 2021 at which time it was sold to Maine publisher, Mr. Pierre Little.
