= Fay Turpin =

American illustrator

- Born: December 9, 1892; Holton, Kansas, U.S.
- Died: June 2, 1967 (age 74); New York, New York, U.S.
- Other names: Fay Turpin Jabine
- Occupations: Illustrator, painter

Fay Turpin Jabine (December 9, 1892 – June 2, 1967) was an American artist, especially known as a magazine and children's book illustrator.

== Personal life and education ==
Turpin was born in Holton, Kansas, the daughter of Austin Caleb Turpin and Iva Gertrude Lawry Turpin. Her father worked for the railroad as a passenger agent. She graduated from the Art Institute of Chicago.

Turpin married lawyer and publisher William Jabine in 1926; they divorced in 1951. She died in 1967, at the age of 74, in New York City.

== Career ==
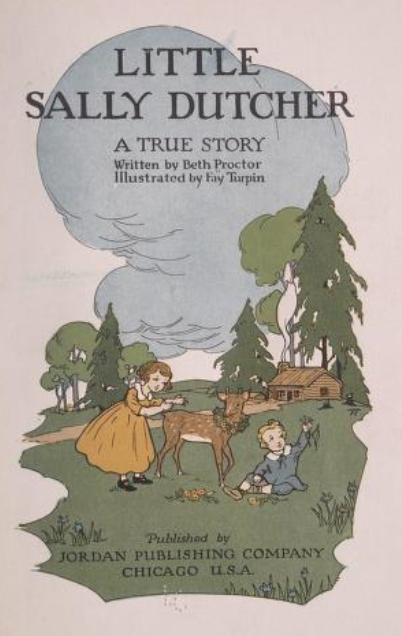
Title page of Little Sally Dutcher (1924) by Beth Proctor, illustrated by Fay Turpin

Turpin illustrated books and magazine articles and stories, including stories in The Rotarian, Survey Graphic, Missions, The American Girl, and High School Life. She was one of the six illustrators tapped by the American Red Cross to create Christmas cards for the troops to send during World War I. She had a gallery show in New York City in 1955, featuring her watercolor paintings of boating scenes.

== Books ==
In addition to her magazine illustrations and paintings, Turpin illustrated children's books and textbooks, including these titles:

- Olive Beaupré Miller, ed., Through the Fairy Halls of my Bookhouse (1920)
- Olive Beaupré Miller, ed., The Treasure Chest of my Bookhouse (1920)
- Olive Beaupré Miller, ed. The Latchkey of my Bookhouse (1921)
- Olive Beaupré Miller, ed., From the Tower Window of my Bookhouse (1922)
- Beth Proctor, The Tale of a Lucky Dog (1924)
- Beth Proctor, Little Sally Dutcher (1924)
- Janet Lewis, The Friendly Adventures of Ollie Ostrich (1928)
- Bernard M. Sheridan et al., Speaking and Writing English (1930)
- Mary Tarver Carroll, The Man Who Dared to Care (1942)
- Larry Turpin, Toys You Can Make At Home (1947)
- Howard Eugene Wilson, Out of the Past (1954)
