= J. D. Holman House =

Historic house in Alabama, United States

- U.S. National Register of Historic Places
- Location within Alabama Location within the United States
- Location: 409 E. Broad St., Ozark, Alabama
- Coordinates: 31°27′35″N 85°38′14″W
- Area: 2.6 acres (1.1 ha)
- Built: 1912–13
- Architect: C. Frank Galliher
- Architectural style: Classical Revival
- NRHP reference No.: 82002007
- Added to NRHP: February 19, 1982

The J. D. Holman House is a historic residence in Ozark, Alabama, United States. One of the most elaborate Neoclassical homes in the Wiregrass Region, it was built in 1912–13 for Jesse DeCosta Holman, a prominent local merchant. The house was listed on the National Register of Historic Places in 1982.

== History ==
Holman, a native of Ozark, began in the livestock business in the 1890s by selling a mule belonging to his father. The business flourished, and allowed him to invest in other enterprises, including a cotton mill (one of the first in Southeast Alabama) and a Buick dealership.

The house was built in 1912–1913 at a cost of around $75,000 (equivalent to $2,443,182 in 2025). Following Holman's death in 1960, it remained in the family until 1982, when it was purchased by Jack Mizell for $120,000. The city of Ozark purchased the house in 2013 for $296,000.

== Architecture ==
The Holman House is a two-story structure, measuring about 62 feet (19 meters) square. It was designed in a Neoclassical style by Montgomery architect C. Frank Galliher.

Two identical porticos are centered on the front and west elevations, facing Broad and Mutual Streets. Four Corinthian columns support a triangular pediment and entablature. An elaborately outlined oval window adorns the center of the pediment. The main entry is surrounded by a latticed transom and sidelights, which are flanked by pilasters with capitals that match the main columns. Above the main entrance is a balcony with wrought iron railings, which features a door with similar transom and sidelights as that below. The portico is framed by pilasters against the house which match the main columns.

A wrap-around porch stretches around the west, south (front), and east sides of the house. On the front elevation, French windows with fanlights on either side of the portico open onto the porch. Casement windows with lattice lights above sit on the second story above the French windows. On the east side, there are two French windows with casements above and a porte-cochère below a small balcony. Windows on the west elevation are one-over-one double-hung sash windows, except for casements on a sleeping porch off the rear of the house.

The interior of the house is laid out with a central hall with two bedrooms and a library on one side, and a dining room and salon on the other. A mantel in the library features reliefs of a horse and a mule, emblematic of Holman's early business. The stairwell at the end of the hall is flanked by Corinthian columns. The second floor corresponds to the first, with a central hall between three bedrooms, two bathrooms, a dressing room, and access to the sleeping porch.
