= Carroll High School (Alabama) =

Carroll High School, Ozark, Alabama

Location
- 141 Eagle Way; Ozark, Alabama 36360; United States; 31°27′41″N 85°37′34″W

Information
- Type: Public
- School district: Ozark City Schools
- CEEB code: 012093
- Principal: Marsielena Williams
- Teaching staff: 34.00 (FTE)
- Grades: 9-12
- Enrollment: 640 (2024-2025)
- Student to teacher ratio: 18.82
- Colors: Red and white
- Mascot: Eagle
- Communities served: Fort Rucker
- Website: chs.ozarkcityschools.net

Carroll High School is located in Ozark, Alabama, United States.

Ozark Schools is also one of three municipal school systems that take on-post Fort Rucker families at the secondary level.

== Notable alumni ==
- Bobby Bright, United States Congressman from Alabama
- Larry Donnell, tight end for the New York Giants
- Wilbur Jackson, running back with the San Francisco 49ers and Washington Redskins
- Meg McGuffin, Miss Alabama 2015
- Steve McLendon, nose tackle for the New York Jets
- Byron Mitchell, 2x WBA super middle weight champion
- Coley McCraney, former preacher and double murderer of local teenage girls J.B. Beasley and Tracie Hawlett
