= Olive Beaupré Miller =

American writer, editor, and publisher of children's literature

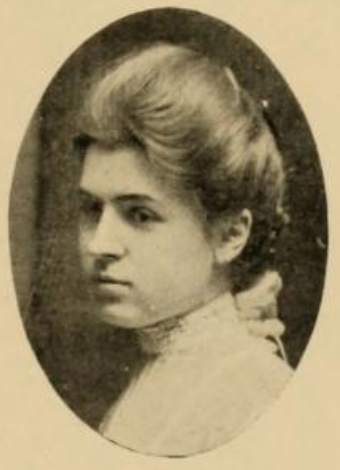
- Born: September 11, 1883; Aurora, Illinois, U.S.
- Died: March 25, 1968 (aged 84)
- Occupations: Writer, editor, publisher

Olive Beaupré Miller (née Olive Kennon Beaupré) (September 11, 1883 – March 25, 1968) was an American writer, publisher and editor of children's literature. She was born in Aurora, Illinois on September 11, 1883, to William S. and Julia (Brady) Beaupré. She received her B.A. from Smith College in 1904.

== The Book House for Children ==
In 1919 Miller established a company, The Book House for Children, to publish popular children’s literature edited by herself to meet her standards:

- "First,--To be well equipped for life, to have ideas and the ability to express them, the child needs a broad background of familiarity with the best in literature.
- "Second,--His stories and rhymes must be selected with care that he may absorb no distorted view of life and its actual values, but may grow up to be mentally clear about values and emotionally impelled to seek what is truly desirable and worthwhile in human living.
- "Third,--The stories and rhymes selected must be graded to the child's understanding at different periods of his growth, graded as to vocabulary, as to subject matter and as to complexity of structure and plot."

The first volume of The Book House series was published in 1920. The series would eventually include twelve volumes.

Later versions of The Book House contained some short stories (such as Little Black Sambo and The Tar Baby) which were thought to be insensitive, and were removed from the Beaupré canon. But as late as 1950 (33rd printing), “Sambo” was still included.

The company was also remarkable for its large female staff at a time when most women did not work outside the home.

Illustrators for The Book House series included Maude and Miska Petersham, Fay Turpin, Donn Philip Crane, Hilda Hanway, Milo Winter, and Peter Newell.

Other series published by the company, The Book House for Children, included "My Travelship" and "A Picturesque Tale of Progress." The Book House for Children was sold to United Educators in 1954.

== Bibliography ==
The Latch Key

My Book House (6 volumes)

- Volume 1, In the Nursery (1920)
- Volume 2, Up One Pair of Stairs (1920)
- Volume 3, Through Fairy Halls (1920)
- Volume 4, The Treasure Chest (1920)
- Volume 5, From The Tower Window (1921)
- Volume 6, The Latch Key (1921)

My Travelship (3 volumes)

- Little Pictures of Japan (1925)
- Tales Told in Holland (1926)
- Nursery Friends From France (1927)

My Book House (7 volumes – red series)

- Volume 1, In the Nursery (1925)
- Volume 2, Story Time (1925)
- Volume 3, Up One Pair of Stairs (1925)
- Volume 4, Over the Hills (1925)
- Volume 5, Through Fairy Halls (1925)
- Volume 6, The Magic Garden (1925)
- Volume 7, The Latch Key with Index (1925)

A Picturesque Tale of Progress (1929)

- Beginnings 1 and 2
- Conquests 1 and 2
- New Nations 1 and 2
- Explorations 1 and 2

My Book House (12 volumes – 1932, 1937, 1971)

Each of the original thicker volumes were divided and made more picture-book-like and easier for a child to handle. The style of illustration and text were changed as well from the original 1920s edition.

- Volume 1, In the Nursery
- Volume 2, Story Time
- Volume 3, Up One Pair of Stairs
- Volume 4, Through the Gate
- Volume 5, Over The Hills
- Volume 6, Through Fairy Halls
- Volume 7, The Magic Garden
- Volume 8, Flying Sails
- Volume 9, The Treasure Chest
- Volume 10, From the Tower Window
- Volume 11, In Shining Armor
- Volume 12, Halls of Fame

=== Other publishers ===
- Engines and Brass Bands"Waubonsie Tales (Chicago: Book House, NY: Doubleday, Doran, 1933), OCLC 4154328
- Heroes, Outlaws and Funny Fellows of American Popular Tales, by Miller, illustrated by Richard Bennett (Doubleday, Doran, 1939), OCLC 166291
- Heroes of the Bible, by Miller, illus. Mariel Wilhoite (NY: Standard Book, 1940), OCLC 5259501; later ISBN 978-1-4179-9147-1
