= Mary Tarver Carroll =

American writer

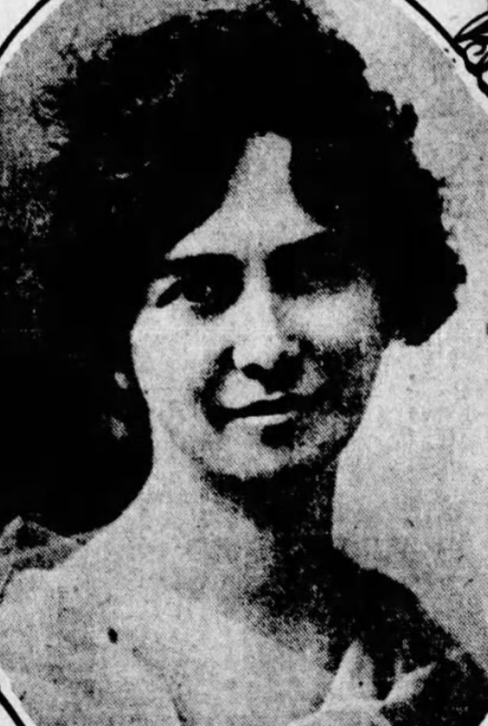
- Mary Tarver Carroll, from a 1916 newspaper
- Born: February 16, 1885; Bullock County, Alabama, U.S.
- Died: January 12, 1955 (age 69); Ozark, Alabama, U.S.
- Occupations: Writer, poet, clubwoman

Mary Tarver Carroll (February 16, 1885 – January 12, 1955) was an American writer and clubwoman based in Ozark, Alabama. She wrote novels and biographies for young readers, poetry, essays, and several ghost stories.

== Personal life ==
Mary Tarver was born in Bullock County, Alabama, the daughter of Milton Wesley Tarver and Sarah Bass Tarver. Tarver married Major Oscar Carroll in 1902. Her husband died in 1936, and she died in 1955, at the age of 69. There is a small collection of her papers at the University of Alabama.

== Career ==
Carroll was a charter member of the PEN Women of Alabama, and vice president of the Alabama Federation of Women's Clubs (AFWC). She was also statewide chair of the AFWC's writing department, organizing writing contests for members. She was a founding member of the Ozark Study Club (OSC). She was poet laureate of the Alabama Methodist Women's Conference. She read her poems and shared her stories at AFWC and OSC events.

== Publications ==
Carroll's poems, articles, and stories appeared in anthologies, and in national periodicals including Christian Advocate, The Editor, The Writer, Ghost Stories, Story Parade, and Love Story Magazine.

- The Renewal (1905, novel based on the life of James Edward Oglethorpe)
- "Extension is the Keyword for 1916 for the State Federation" (1916, article)
- "More Tender" and "A Glowing Cross of Red" (1917, poems)
- "Violets" (1921, poem)
- "Chaperoned by Molly" (1921, story)
- "Thad Turns the Tables" (1922, story)
- "The Curse on the House of de Jarnie" (1923, reprinted 1929, story)
- "On Trudging On" (1923, short essay)
- "How Do You Feel?" (1926, essay)
- "Wanderlure" and "Green" (1928, poems)
- "The Tree with a Human Shadow" (1929, story)
- "The Mystery of the Jealous Queen" (1930, story)
- "Florida Adventure" (1941, story)
- The Man Who Would Not Wait (1941, children's biography of Aaron Burr)
- The Man Who Dared to Care (1942, children's biography of James Edward Oglethorpe, illustrated by Fay Turpin)
- Keep My Flag Flying: Daniel Webster (1945, children's biography of Daniel Webster)
