= 1st Florida Cavalry Regiment (Union) =

Union Army cavalry regiment

- Active: October 29, 1863 – November 17, 1865
- Disbanded: November 17, 1865
- Country: United States
- Allegiance: Union
- Branch: Cavalry
- Size: Regiment
- Engagements: American Civil War: Battle of Fort Hodgson; Battle of Eucheeanna Court House; Battle of Marianna; Battle of Vernon; Skirmish at Milton; Raid on Pollard; Battle of Newton (detachment); Skirmish at Muddy Creek; Battle of Fort Blakeley; Battle of Hobdy's Bridge (detachment)

The 1st Florida Cavalry Regiment was a cavalry regiment from Florida that served in the Union Army from October 29, 1863, to November 17, 1865, during the American Civil War.

== Organization and Recruitment ==
The regiment was formed by General Nathaniel P. Banks on October 29, 1863. Recruitment and organization of the unit began at Fort Barrancas and lasted from December, 1863 to August, 1864. It was attached to the 2nd and 3rd Brigades, District West Florida, Army of the Gulf until January 1865, and to the 2nd Brigade of Thomas John Lucas' Cavalry Division until May 1865.

The unit was composed primarily of men from southern Alabama and northwestern Florida and 81% of the initial recruits came from only nine counties in the two aforementioned regions. By the end of the war, the unit had recruited more than 700 men.

Counties and number of troops contributed to the unit.
| County | Number of recruits |
|---|---|
| Baldwin County, AL | 32 men |
| Washington County, FL | 35 men |
| Holmes County, FL | 38 men |
| Washington County, FL | 39 men |
| Henry County, AL | 39 men |
| Covington County, AL | 47 men |
| Coffee County, AL | 53 men |
| Santa Rosa County, FL | 58 men |
| Walton County, FL | 62 men |

Recruitment of the unit started in December 1863, when a recruiting station was established on the far east side of Santa Rosa Island. By February 1864, the regiment numbered 207 men with thirty more on their way. However, recruitment was slowed because there was a lack of cash to pay the recruits' bounties.

== Service ==
The regiment saw action in the surrounding area of Fort Barrancas. In 1864, such action included a July 21–25 expedition to Pollard, Alabama, a September 18 – October 4 expedition to Marianna, Florida, an October 25–28 expedition up Blackwater Bay, a November 16–17 expedition to Pine Barren Creek, and a December 13–14 expedition to Pollard. In 1865, the unit went on a February 22–25 expedition to Milton, Florida before taking part in the March 18 – April 9 campaign against Mobile, Alabama and its defenses. This campaign included action at the Battle of Newton and the Battle of Fort Blakeley. After the occupation of Mobile on April 12, the regiment marched towards Montgomery, Alabama. It served in Alabama until May when it was ordered back to Barrancas, from where the regiment continued to serve in Western and Middle Florida. The regiment was mustered out on November 17, 1865.

== See also ==
- List of Florida Union Civil War units
