= Claybank Log Church =

Historic church in Alabama, United States

- U.S. National Register of Historic Places
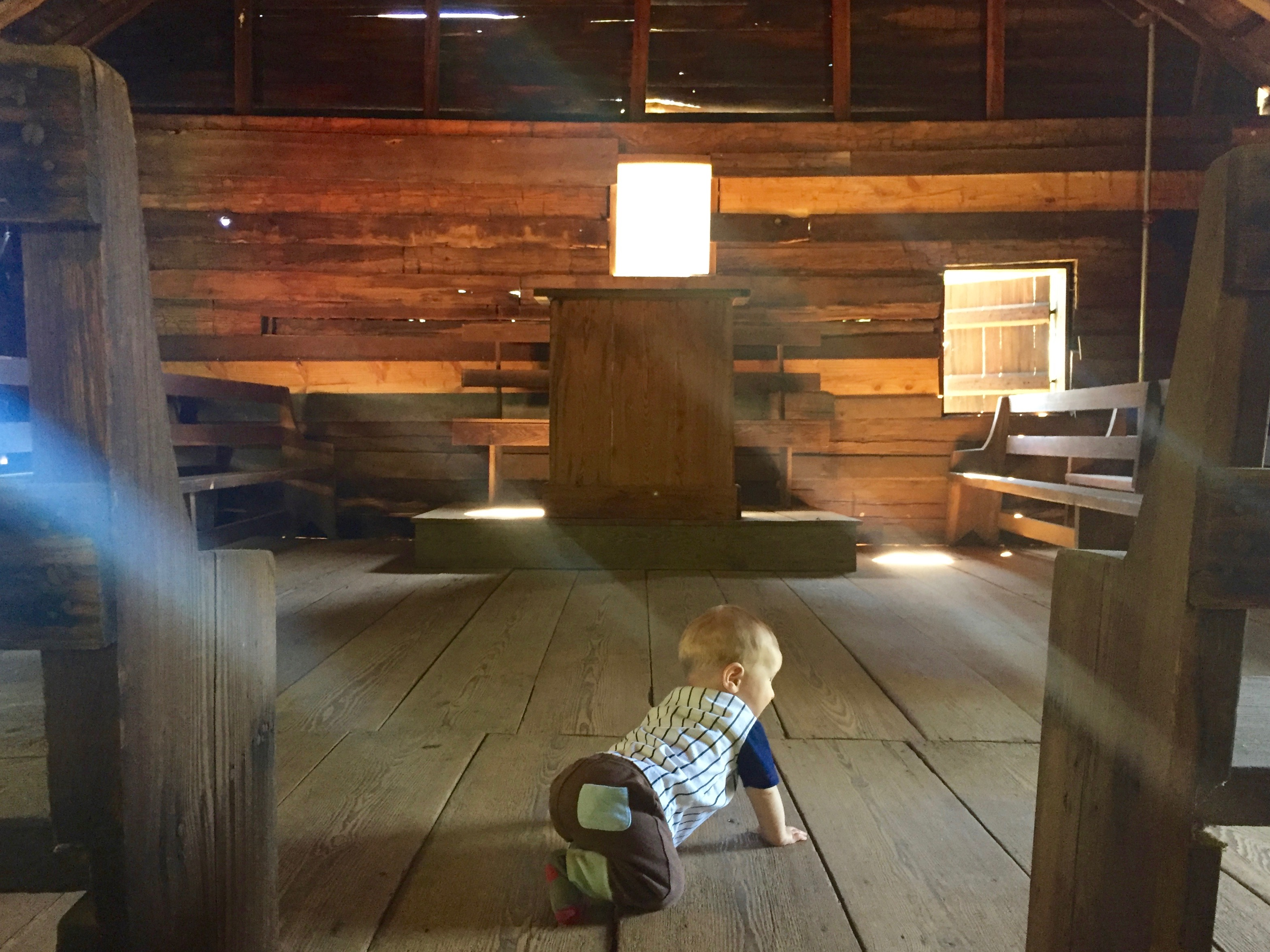

- Location within Alabama Location within the United States
- Location: E. Andrews Ave., Ozark, Alabama
- Coordinates: 31°26′48″N 85°39′41″W
- Area: 0.8 acres (0.32 ha)
- Built: 1852
- Architect: Reverend Dempsey Dowling
- NRHP reference No.: 76000321
- Added to NRHP: November 7, 1976

Claybank Log Church is a historic church in Ozark, Alabama, United States. The building is the second church on the site, replacing a similar structure built in 1829.

The current building was constructed by a Methodist minister, although the church was also used for various community functions. It is believed to be the oldest extant building in Dale County. In 1873, the congregation built a new church closer to the center of town. The log church was used only sporadically after 1900, and was purchased by the Claybank Memorial Association in the 1960s. The interior of the church was restored to its original appearance in 1980.

The church consists of one large room, measuring 30 feet, 5 inches, by 25 feet, 3 inches (approximately 9 by 7.5 meters). The walls are formed by pine logs ranging in diameter from 12 to 15.5 inches (30 to 40 cm) joined at the corners by dovetail joints.

It was added to the National Register of Historic Places November 7, 1976.
