= Ozark, Alabama =

City in Alabama, United States

Ozark
- City
- Flag Seal

- Location of Ozark in Dale County, Alabama.
- Coordinates: 31°28′12″N 85°38′20″W
- Country: United States
- State: Alabama
- County: Dale
- Settled: 1822
- Incorporated: October 27, 1870

Government
  - Type: Mayor/City Council
  - Mayor: Mark Blankenship

Area
  - Total: 34.34 sq mi (88.94 km^{2})
  - Land: 34.10 sq mi (88.33 km^{2})
  - Water: 0.24 sq mi (0.61 km^{2})
- Elevation: 420 ft (130 m)

Population (2020)
  - Total: 14,368
  - Density: 421.3/sq mi (162.66/km^{2})
- Time zone: UTC-6 (Central (CST))
  - Summer (DST): UTC-5 (CDT)
- ZIP Codes: 36360–36361
- Area code: 334
- FIPS code: 01-57648
- GNIS feature ID: 2404456
- Website: www.ozarkal.gov

Ozark is a city in and the county seat of Dale County, Alabama. As of the 2020 census, Ozark had a population of 14,368.

Ozark is the principal city of the Ozark Micropolitan Statistical Area, as well as a part of the Dothan-Ozark Combined Statistical Area. Ozark was originally a part of Enterprise–Ozark micropolitan area before being split, and for a longer while was part of the Dothan-Enterprise-Ozark combined statistical area but Enterprise later became its own separate primary statistical area in later censuses. Fort Rucker, the primary flight training base for Army Aviation, abuts Ozark.

== History ==
Flag of Ozark from 1999 to 2024

The Ozark area was originally inhabited by the Muscogee people. It is said that Ozark received its name after a traveler visited and was reminded of the Ozark Mountains in Arkansas.

The first known European settler in Ozark was John Merrick Sr., a veteran of the Revolutionary War, in 1822. In honor of him, the town was named Merricks. It was later changed to Woodshop, which was its name when the town received its post office. The first appearance of the name Ozark was in 1855, when the citizens requested a name change.

The county seat was moved from Newton to Ozark 1870.

Ozark is home to four sites listed on the National Register of Historic Places: the Claybank Log Church, the Samuel Lawson Dowling House, the Old Train Depot, and the J. D. Holman House.

== Geography ==
Ozark is part of the Wiregrass Region.

Major highways that run through the city include U.S. Route 231 and Alabama State Routes 27 and 249. US 231 runs northwest to southeast through the city, leading northwest 34 mi (55 km) to Troy and southeast 23 mi (37 km) to Dothan. SR 27 leads east 31 mi (50 km) to Abbeville and southwest 19 mi (31 km) to Enterprise.

According to the U.S. Census Bureau, the city has a total area of 34.5 square miles (89 km^{2}) of which 34.2 square miles (89 km^{2}) is land and 0.2 square miles (0.52 km^{2}) (0.70%) is water.

=== Climate ===
According to the Köppen climate classification, Ozark has a humid subtropical climate (abbreviated Cfa).

Climate data for Ozark, 1991–2020 simulated normals (400 ft elevation)
Month	Jan	Feb	Mar	Apr	May	Jun	Jul	Aug	Sep	Oct	Nov	Dec	Year
Mean daily maximum °F (°C)	59.7 (15.4)	63.7 (17.6)	70.9 (21.6)	77.4 (25.2)	84.7 (29.3)	89.2 (31.8)	90.9 (32.7)	90.3 (32.4)	86.9 (30.5)	79.0 (26.1)	69.3 (20.7)	62.1 (16.7)	77.0 (25.0)
Daily mean °F (°C)	48.9 (9.4)	52.5 (11.4)	58.8 (14.9)	65.5 (18.6)	73.4 (23.0)	79.3 (26.3)	81.1 (27.3)	80.6 (27.0)	76.8 (24.9)	67.6 (19.8)	57.4 (14.1)	51.3 (10.7)	66.1 (19.0)
Mean daily minimum °F (°C)	37.9 (3.3)	41.2 (5.1)	46.9 (8.3)	53.6 (12.0)	62.2 (16.8)	69.3 (20.7)	71.4 (21.9)	70.9 (21.6)	66.6 (19.2)	56.3 (13.5)	45.5 (7.5)	40.6 (4.8)	55.2 (12.9)
Average precipitation inches (mm)	5.05 (128.21)	4.94 (125.41)	5.19 (131.72)	4.83 (122.73)	3.40 (86.33)	5.21 (132.32)	6.23 (158.32)	5.22 (132.60)	4.32 (109.73)	3.12 (79.17)	4.05 (102.82)	5.29 (134.27)	56.85 (1,443.63)
Average dew point °F (°C)	40.3 (4.6)	43.2 (6.2)	47.3 (8.5)	54.0 (12.2)	61.5 (16.4)	68.9 (20.5)	71.6 (22.0)	71.2 (21.8)	67.3 (19.6)	57.6 (14.2)	48.2 (9.0)	43.5 (6.4)	56.2 (13.5)
Source: PRISM Climate Group

== Demographics ==
Historical population
Census	Pop.	Note	%±
1880	512		—
1890	1,195		133.4%
1900	1,570		31.4%
1910	2,229		42.0%
1920	2,518		13.0%
1930	3,103		23.2%
1940	3,601		16.0%
1950	5,238		45.5%
1960	9,534		82.0%
1970	13,555		42.2%
1980	13,188		−2.7%
1990	12,922		−2.0%
2000	15,119		17.0%
2010	14,907		−1.4%
2020	14,368		−3.6%
U.S. Decennial Census

=== 2020 census ===
As of the 2020 census, Ozark had a population of 14,368. The median age was 43.8 years. 21.4% of residents were under the age of 18 and 21.7% were 65 years of age or older. For every 100 females there were 89.2 males, and for every 100 females age 18 and over there were 84.3 males age 18 and over.

84.9% of residents lived in urban areas, while 15.1% lived in rural areas.

There were 6,099 households, including 3,651 families, in Ozark. Of all households, 27.4% had children under the age of 18 living in them, 38.6% were married-couple households, 19.7% were households with a male householder and no spouse or partner present, and 36.0% were households with a female householder and no spouse or partner present. About 32.7% of all households were made up of individuals and 14.2% had someone living alone who was 65 years of age or older.

There were 6,814 housing units, of which 10.5% were vacant. The homeowner vacancy rate was 2.9% and the rental vacancy rate was 8.1%.

Ozark racial composition
Race	Num.	Perc.
White (non-Hispanic)	8,147	56.7%
Black or African American (non-Hispanic)	4,760	33.13%
Native American	65	0.45%
Asian	151	1.05%
Pacific Islander	8	0.06%
Other/Mixed	671	4.67%
Hispanic or Latino	566	3.94%

=== 2010 census ===
At the 2010 census, there were 14,907 people, 6,209 households, and 4,064 families living in the city. The population density was 440 inhabitants per square mile (170/km^{2}). There were 6,920 housing units at an average density of 201.1 per square mile (77.6/km^{2}). The racial makeup of the city was 64.8% White, 30.2% Black or African American, 0.7% Native American, 0.9% Asian, 0.0% Pacific Islander, 0.8% from other races, and 2.6% from two or more races. 3.2% of the population were Hispanic or Latino of any race.

Of the 6,209 households 26.1% had children under the age of 18 living with them, 43.3% were married couples living together, 17.5% had a female householder with no husband present, and 34.5% were non-families. 30.5% of households were one person and 12.0% were one person aged 65 or older. The average household size was 2.35 and the average family size was 2.91.

The age distribution was 23.1% under the age of 18, 8.4% from 18 to 24, 23.1% from 25 to 44, 28.2% from 45 to 64, and 17.2% 65 or older. The median age was 41.2 years. For every 100 females, there were 90.7 males. For every 100 females age 18 and over, there were 92.6 males.

The median household income was $41,079 and the median family income was $52,061. Males had a median income of $41,513 versus $28,227 for females. The per capita income for the city was $22,103. About 13.6% of families and 18.4% of the population were below the poverty line, including 27.2% of those under age 18 and 14.4% of those age 65 or over.

== Education ==
Ozark is served by the Ozark City Schools. Schools located in the city are Carroll High School (grades 9 through 12), Carroll Career Center (grades 9 through 12), D.A. Smith Middle School (grades 6 through 8), Harry N. Mixon Intermediate School (grades 3 through 5), and Joseph W. Lisenby Primary School (grades k through 2.)

Dale County School District is headquartered in Ozark, but does not include Ozark.

There is one private school in Ozark, Harvest Christian School for K-12.

Post-secondary education is available at Enterprise State Community College's Alabama Aviation Center at Ozark. Programs are offered in aviation maintenance technology.

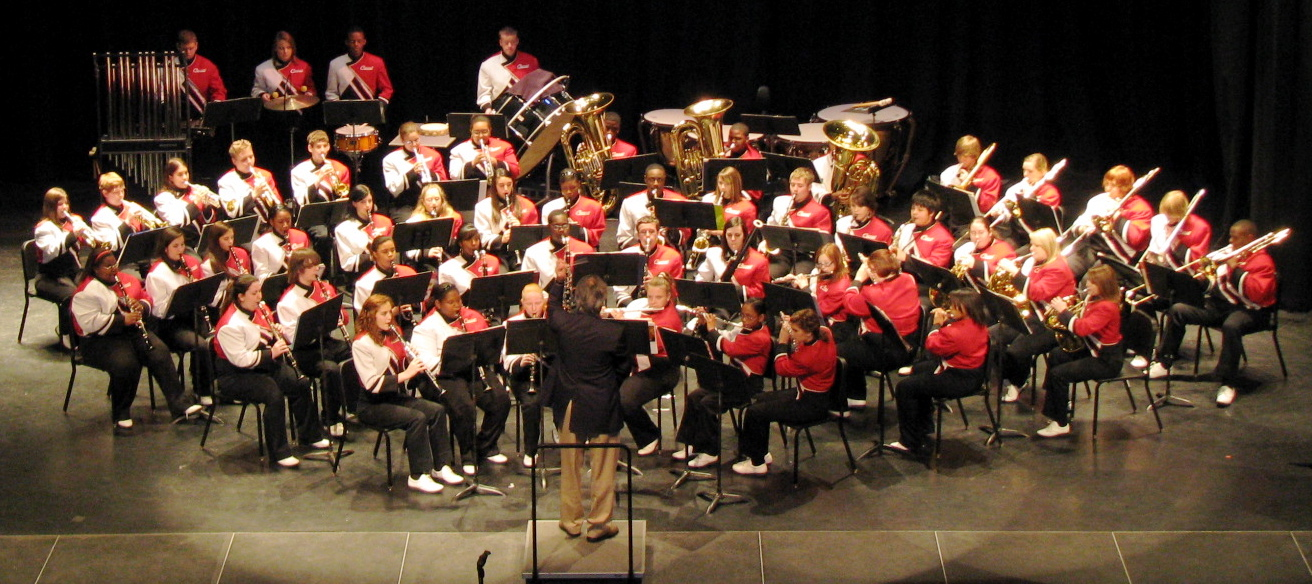
Carroll High School Band 2009

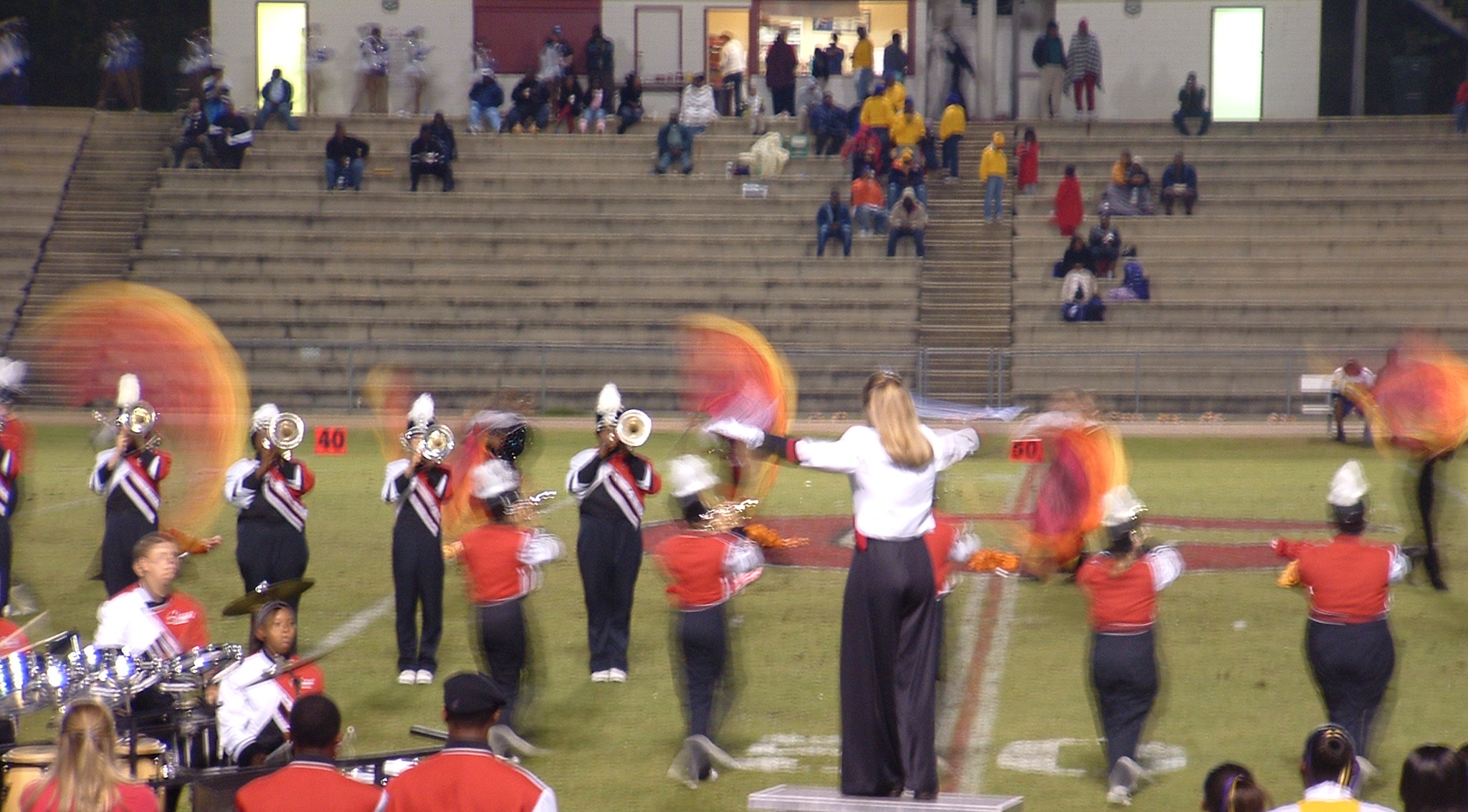
Carroll High School Marching Band "Pride of the Wiregrass" 2007

== Media ==
=== Radio stations ===
- WDBT 103.9 FM (News/Talk)
- WOAB 104.9 FM (Regional Mexican)
- WOZK 900 AM (Urban adult contemporary)

=== Newspaper ===
- The Free Press (1896–1900)
- The Southern Star- weekly

== Notable people ==
- Bobby Bright, former mayor of Montgomery, Alabama, and former U.S. Congressman for the 2nd district of Alabama
- Mary Tarver Carroll, writer and clubwoman
- Steve Clouse, state representative
- Larry Donnell, tight end for the New York Giants
- Wilbur Jackson, National Football League running back (1974–1982), SF49ers, Washington Redskins
- Meg McGuffin, Miss Alabama 2015
- Steve McLendon, nose tackle/defensive end, Pittsburgh Steelers
- Byron Mitchell, former super middleweight boxing champion
- Marc Ronan, Major League Baseball catcher
- Naseeb Saliba, co-founder of Tutor-Saliba Corporation
- Josh Savage, professional football player
- Henry B. Steagall, former U.S. Congressman for the 3rd district of Alabama and Chairman of the U.S. House Committee on Banking and Currency

== See also ==
- Ozark Civic Center
