= Confederate Home Guard =

Military unit of the Confederacy during the American Civil War

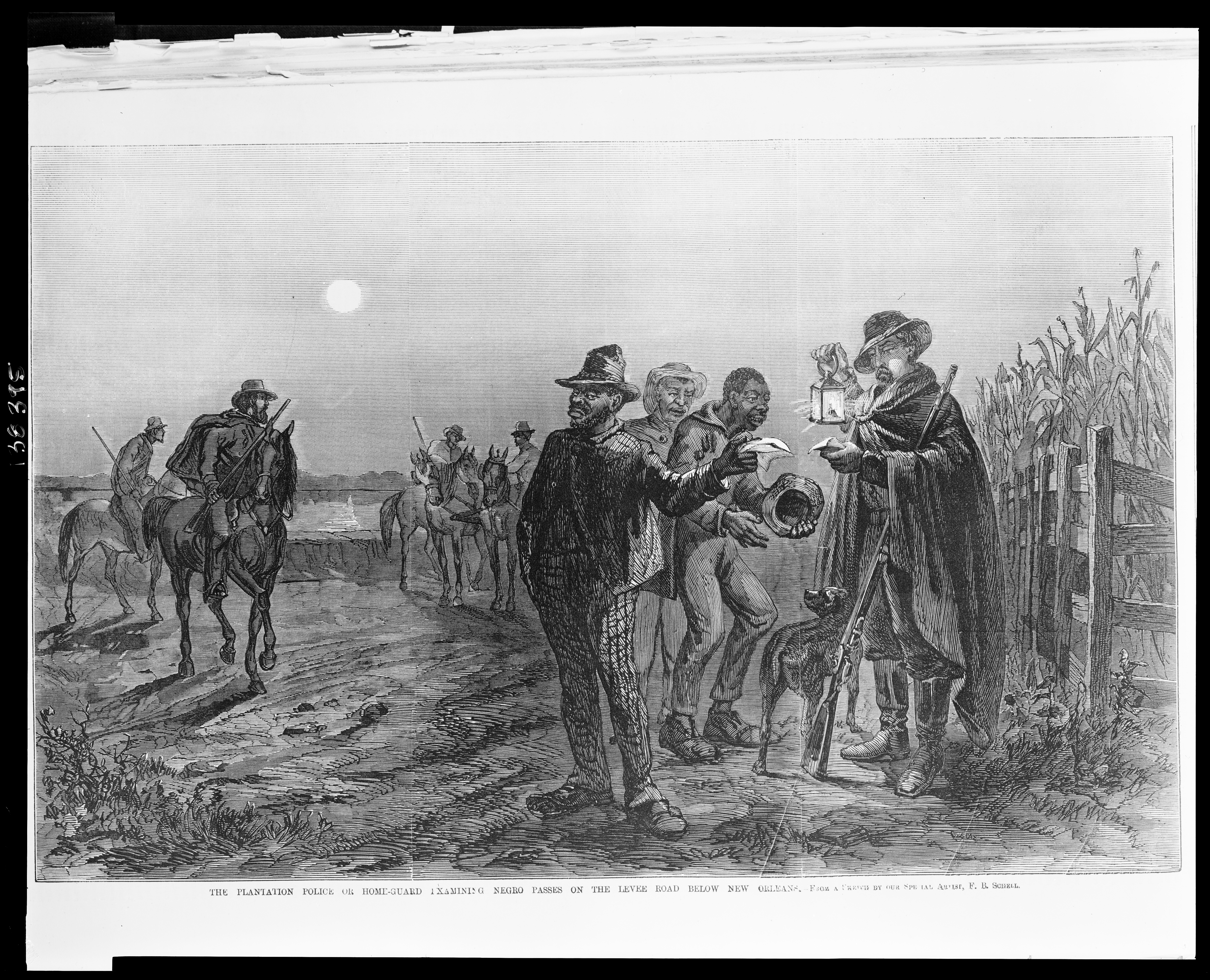
Sketch from Frank Leslie's Illustrated Newspaper, 1863: a Home Guardsman examines "Negro passes" on the levee road below New Orleans.

The Home Guard of the several states of the Confederacy during the American Civil War included all able-bodied white males between the ages of 18 and 50 who were exempt from Confederate service, excepting only the governor and other officials. The Home Guard replaced the militia whose members had volunteered or been conscripted into service in the Confederate Army.

Citizens of some states also formed Unionist Home Guard units. For example, in Kentucky, the Home Guard consisted of Unionist men; Confederate sympathizers in the state, led by Simon Bolivar Buckner, formed militia groups known as the State Guard.

== Objectives ==
Home Guards were tasked with both the defense of the Confederate home front, as well as to help track down and capture Confederate Army deserters. As a militia, the Home Guard had a rank structure and did have certain regulations, whether those were enforced or not. Home Guard units were, essentially, to be a last defense against any invading Union forces. They also were used at times to gather information about invading Union forces troop movements, as well as to identify and control any local civilians who were considered sympathetic to the Union cause. They received no military training, and although they could be drafted into the Confederate service if need be, there are only a few cases in which that happened. It was often made up of older planters or others exempted from front line service.

== Background and implementation ==
A bounty was offered by the Confederate government for the capture of deserters, although it was rarely paid, due to the government's debt.

While most able-bodied Southern men went away to war, many stayed behind, either by choice or due to something that prevented them from serving in the army. Planters owning 20 slaves or more were exempted from service, with other family members exempted based on their total slaveholding. Although many states did not initially form Home Guard units, by 1863 all 11 Confederate states had done so. Initially tasked with being the defense force against any Union Army elements that might pass through the Confederate battle lines and enter into Southern territory, the Home Guard was later used to help capture Confederate army deserters returning to their homes.

The Home Guard possessed a wide range of powers, whether those powers were legitimate and recognized by the Confederacy or not. As there were few younger Southern men at home, few could stand in the way of any Home Guard unit that wished to abuse its powers. In addition to this, due to the war demanding so much attention from the Confederate Congress, not to mention the other branches of the government and the military, little attention was paid to the Home Guard units. All were commanded locally, and rarely did they receive any specific direction. In essence, the Home Guard units could work as they pleased. More often than not they made their own decisions and priorities.

Depending on the area, Home Guard units would be at times nothing more than a group of men identified as such, working as they pleased. At other times, most usually in states located in what was known as the Eastern Theater of the American Civil War, Home Guard units had base camps and headquarters, went on patrol, and scouted for possible deserters or Union stragglers. Most of the time, Home Guard units were poorly equipped, due to shortages of goods, ammunition, and weapons to supply the Confederate Army. They rarely dressed in anything that could be called a uniform, but did make efforts to wear the same color clothing as the Confederate soldiers.

By the middle of the war, many Home Guard units were composed of wounded soldiers that had returned to recover.

Deserters that were encountered by Home Guard patrols were dealt with in many different fashions. At times, the deserting soldiers would be returned to the Army via Confederate units that were stationed near to whatever area the deserters were captured. Sometimes deserters faced summary execution by the Home Guard.

By 1864, the Union Army occupied much of the formerly Confederate-controlled areas. With Union forces now patrolling home-front areas, many Home Guard units disbanded to avoid being considered or mistaken for guerrillas, and it became increasingly difficult for the Confederacy to enforce any action against deserters who returned home. Even in the Western theater states of Arkansas and Louisiana, Union troops were regularly seen, and at times the troops had taken control of many towns or cities. Some Southern citizens who lived in those states and who did not support secession had now openly come out in support of the Union, often forming Union Army regiments or units to serve in that army. These newly formed Union units, made up of local citizens, personally knew the members of the Home Guard, which greatly hampered, if not completely disabled, the Home Guard's ability to function.

By the war's end, very few such units were still in existence. However, some were still active in areas where Union soldiers were less common, although these were mostly bands of thieves preying on the less fortunate. One of the most notorious of these was the Independent Rangers, led by early Old West outlaw Cullen Baker. In late 1864, this band was responsible for what became known as the Massacre of Saline, when they murdered ten unarmed men from Perry County, Arkansas, on the Saline River.

== In popular culture ==
- The film Free State of Jones (2016), starring Matthew McConaughey, portrays the Home Guard in Jones County, Mississippi as taking excessive taxes in goods from the women and children left on yeoman farms.
- The Confederate Home Guard is featured in a major role in the novel Cold Mountain (1997) by Charles Frazier and the 2003 film adaptation of the same name, written and directed by Anthony Minghella. Both novel and film are presented from the point of view of a Confederate deserter, and the Home Guards hunting him are characterized as villains.
- In Margaret Mitchell's novel Gone with the Wind (1936), the Home Guard fights General Sherman's army when it invades Atlanta. The soldiers fight bravely, but lose the battle and many are killed. This characterization was also portrayed in the movie by the same name adapted from the novel, which was a huge success.

== See also ==
- Home Guard (Union)
- National Guard of the United States
- Hatfield–McCoy feud
- Confederate Conscription Acts 1862–1864
