= Wiregrass (region) =

Area of the southeastern United States

Coordinates: 31.061333°N 85.118208°W

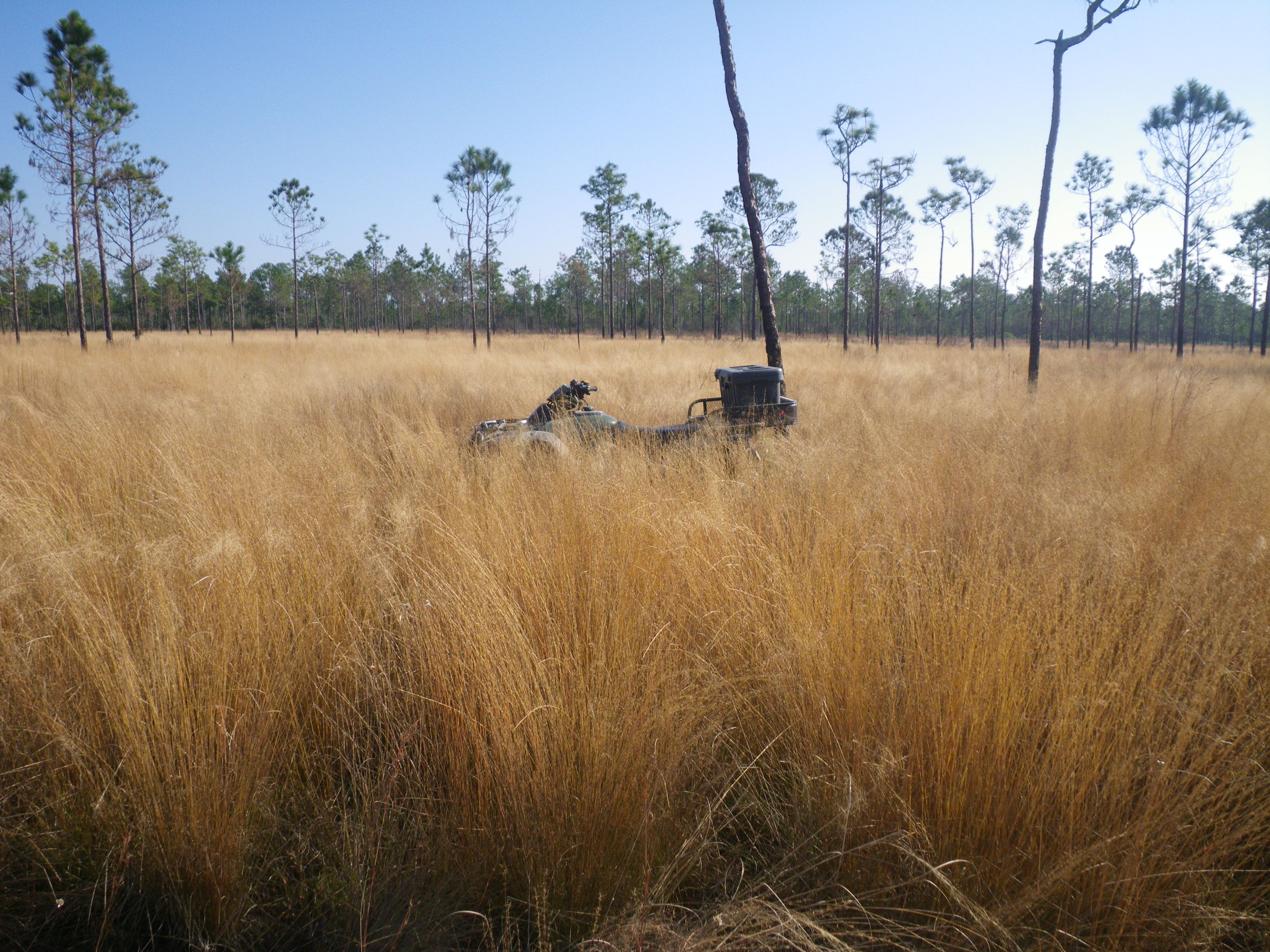
Wiregrass ecosystem on the Gulf Coast

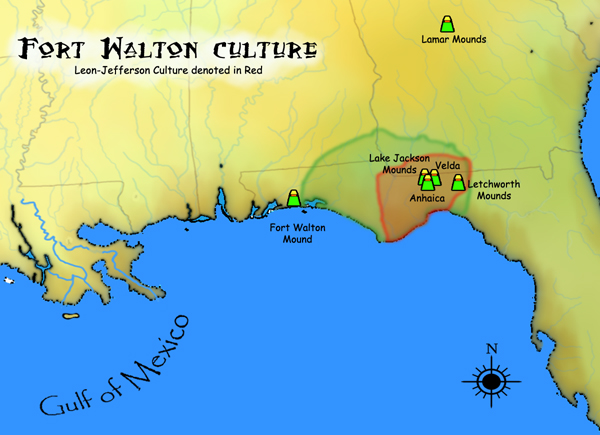
Map showing southern Georgia, southeastern Alabama, and the Florida Panhandle.

The Wiregrass region, also known as the Wiregrass plains or Wiregrass country, is an area of the Southern United States encompassing parts of southern Georgia, southeastern Alabama, and the Florida Panhandle. The region is named for the native Aristida stricta, commonly known as wiregrass due to its texture.

== History ==
Ancestors of the Creek Nation were the first humans in the Wiregrass region and retained control of the area until they were forced to cede most of the territory to the United States in the 1814 Treaty of Fort Jackson. The first white settlers were cattle drovers who took advantage of the wiregrass sprouting earlier than other fodder to feed their semi-wild herds.

== Geography ==
Originally, the wiregrass region touched twenty-three counties from Savannah to the Chattahoochee River. The current region stretches approximately from just below Macon, Georgia and follows the Fall Line west to Montgomery, Alabama. It then turns south and runs to approximately Washington County, Florida in the northern panhandle. From there it runs east, roughly making its southern boundary along Interstate 10 to Lake City, Florida before turning north, roughly following the Suwannee River back into Georgia and along the western fringes of the Okefenokee Swamp and then running due north back to Macon.

== Major highways ==
Interstate 75, Interstate 10, U.S. Route 231, U.S. Route 331, and portions of Interstate 65 traverse parts of the Wiregrass. The portion of U.S. Route 84 through Georgia is known as the Wiregrass Georgia Parkway.

== Major cities ==
Major cities in the region include:

- Abbeville, Alabama
- Abbeville, Georgia
- Andalusia, Alabama
- Albany, Georgia
- Americus, Georgia
- Bainbridge, Georgia
- Baxley, Georgia
- Blakely, Georgia
- Brundidge, Alabama
- Cordele, Georgia
- Daleville, Alabama
- Donalsonville, Georgia
- Dothan, Alabama
- Douglas, Georgia
- Enterprise, Alabama
- Eufaula, Alabama
- Fitzgerald, Georgia
- Geneva, Alabama
- Homerville, Georgia
- Jasper, Florida
- Lake City, Florida
- Live Oak, Florida
- Luverne, Alabama
- Madison, Florida
- Monticello, Florida
- Marianna, Florida
- Moultrie, Georgia
- Nashville, Georgia
- Ocilla, Georgia
- Opp, Alabama
- Ozark, Alabama
- Panama City, Florida
- Perry, Florida
- Tallahassee, Florida
- Thomasville, Georgia
- Tifton, Georgia
- Troy, Alabama
- Valdosta, Georgia
- Waycross, Georgia
- White Springs, Florida

== Military bases ==
The region includes Fort Rucker, a U.S. Army post located mostly in Dale County, Alabama. The post is the primary flight training base for Army Aviation and is home to the United States Army Aviation Center of Excellence (USAACE) and the United States Army Aviation Museum, as well as Moody Air Force Base located in Lowndes and Lanier County, Georgia. Moody AFB is the home of the 23rd Wing. The wing executes worldwide close air support, force protection, and combat search and rescue operations (CSAR) in support of humanitarian interests, United States national security and the global war on terrorism (GWOT).

== Waterways ==
There are two major waterways in the region, and they bisect the Wiregrass, dividing it into three portions. The Chattahoochee River and the Flint River join to form the Apalachicola River, which flows south from Bainbridge, Georgia and Lake Seminole to the Gulf of Mexico at Apalachicola, Florida. Other waterways include Little Choctawhatchee River, Choctawhatchee River, and Choctawhatchee Bay.

== Weather ==
Due to its proximity to the Gulf of Mexico, the Wiregrass region experiences high heat and humidity in the summers, and has mostly mild winters. The area is prone to hurricanes and tropical storms, most notably Hurricane Michael which highly impacted the area during its landfall in October 2018.

== Representation in other media ==
Harper's Magazine published a poem by Charles Ghigna in September 1974 describing the Wiregrass Region; it is titled "The Alabama Wiregrassers."
