= 1991 Austin yogurt shop murders =

1991 quadruple murder in Texas, United States

Coordinates: 30.3596°N 97.7391°W

Austin yogurt shop murders
- Location: 2947 West Anderson Lane, Austin, Texas, U.S.
- Date: December 6, 1991; 34 years ago c. 11:00 p.m. (CST)
- Attack type: Mass shooting, mass murder, rape, arson, femicide, quadruple murder
- Weapons: .22-caliber revolver; .380 AMT Backup
- Deaths: 4
- Perpetrator: Robert Eugene Brashers
- Motive: Unknown

The 1991 Austin yogurt shop murders were a quadruple homicide that took place at an I Can't Believe It's Yogurt! shop in Austin, Texas, United States, on December 6, 1991. The victims were four teenage girls: 13-year-old Amy Ayers, 17-year-old Eliza Thomas, 17-year-old Jennifer Harbison, and Jennifer's 15-year-old sister, Sarah. Jennifer and Eliza were employees of the shop, while Sarah and her friend Amy were in the shop to get a ride home with Jennifer when it closed at 11:00 p.m.

About one hour before closing time, a man was permitted to use the public restroom in the back. He waited there and may have propped a rear door open. A couple who left the shop just before closing time reported seeing two men at a table acting furtively. However, these alleged sightings were never confirmed to be connected to the crime. Around midnight, a patrolman reported a fire in the shop, and first responders discovered the bodies of the girls inside. The victims had been shot in the head; at least three of them had been raped. A .22 firearm and a .380 pistol were used to commit the murders, and the perpetrator likely exited through a back door that was found unlocked.

The organized method of operation, ability to control the victims and destruction of evidence by arson pointed to adults experienced in crime rather than teenagers, according to one of the original detectives on the case. Instead, the Austin Police Department (APD) arrested four teenagers; the District Attorney kept three in custody for years before dropping charges against one and successfully convicting two others, one of whom received a death sentence. In 2006 the appeals court overturned the convictions, but the District Attorney kept the two in prison until a court dismissed all charges against both men in 2009.

At the time of the murders, the APD collected DNA from an unknown male suspect as a result of three of the rapes. In 2025, the APD matched that DNA to serial killer and serial rapist Robert Eugene Brashers, who had committed suicide in 1999 while in a police standoff for a different crime.

== Murders ==
Shortly before midnight on Friday, December 6, 1991, a patrolman from the Austin Police Department (APD) contacted his dispatcher to report fire coming from an I Can't Believe It's Yogurt! shop. After the fire was extinguished, firefighters discovered four nude bodies. Each had been shot in the head "execution style" with a .22 caliber lead bullet. Sarah, Eliza, and Jennifer were all gagged and bound with their own underwear. All three had been severely charred and shot in the back of the head.

Unlike the others, Amy's body was found in a separate part of the shop. She was not charred but she had received second- and "very early" third-degree burns on 25–30% of her body. She was found with a "sock-like cloth" around her neck. She had been shot in the same way as the others; however, the bullet had missed her brain. She also had a second bullet wound that had caused severe damage to her brain, exiting through her lateral cheek and jawline. The second bullet was .380 caliber and had been fired from an AMT Backup.

=== Victims ===
- Amy Ayers, aged 13
- Eliza Thomas, aged 17
- Jennifer Harbison, aged 17
- Sarah Harbison, aged 15

== Investigation and false convictions ==
At the time of the killings, a known serial killer, Kenneth McDuff, was in the area. He had a history of multiple murders involving teenagers but was soon ruled out. He was executed on November 17, 1998. Austin police admit that over 50 people, including McDuff on the day of his execution, had confessed to the yogurt shop murders. A confession in 1992 by two Mexican nationals, held by Mexican authorities, was soon disputed and finally ruled false.

Investigators initially identified a significant number of potential suspects, among them a 16-year-old caught with a weapon of the same caliber as that used in the killings in a nearby shopping mall a few days later. Although the teenaged suspect initially gave promising information, after tough questioning the detectives decided that he was trying to get himself out of the gun charge; they eliminated him and three petty criminal friends whom he had implicated, none of whom was older than 17 at the time.

Several years later, a new detective on the case theorized that the four teens from 1991 were credible suspects. By that time, they were in their twenties. In a string of interrogations conducted by various detectives, confessions were obtained from some of the suspects. They said all four – Robert Springsteen, Michael Scott, Maurice Pierce, and Forrest Welborn – had participated in the murders.

Since there was no record of what was said to the men in the 1991 interrogations, it was impossible to know whether the detectives had supplied specific crime scene information to the suspects at that time. Such information, if recited back as their own "personal recollection" of the crime details in later interrogations, could be used to corroborate a false confession by the suspects. The four were arrested in September 1999; Welborn's charges were dropped in 2000, while Pierce was held in Travis County jail until 2003, when his charges were also dropped.

Scott's and Springsteen's trials were held in 2001 and 2002, respectively. The prosecution went into great detail about the horrific nature of the crimes against the young victims but presented no hard evidence other than the false confessions given seven years after the crimes. The two were convicted of capital murder. Springsteen was sentenced to death and Scott was sentenced to life imprisonment. In 2005, Springsteen, who was 17 at the time of the murders, had his sentence commuted to life in prison by Governor Rick Perry as a result of Roper v. Simmons.

The Texas Court of Criminal Appeals overturned both convictions in 2008, ruling that prosecutors had violated the Confrontation Clause of the U.S. Constitution by using portions of the co-defendants alleged confessions at the trials when they could not be cross-examined by defense attorneys. The men were freed in 2009. The prosecution intended to re-try both defendants, however forensic investigation showed that the DNA found in one of the victims was not theirs, nor was it that of the other two suspects implicated through confessions. The prosecution consequently abandoned its plans for a retrial. Texas courts later decided that those released were not entitled to compensation as they had not proven they did not commit the crime.

One of the detectives in the interrogations, Hector Polanco, had been accused of coercing false confessions in a previous, notorious case involving exonerated defendants Christopher Ochoa and Richard Danziger. Both were released after 13 years in prison; Danziger was assaulted in prison, which resulted in permanent brain damage.

Seven jurors from the trials have stated that they would not have convicted Scott and Springsteen had this evidence been available at the time.

=== Convictions overturned ===
In 2006, the Texas Court of Criminal Appeals overturned Robert Springsteen's conviction based on an unfair trial. The U.S. Supreme Court refused to reinstate the conviction in February 2007. On August 20, 2008, the defense lawyers for Scott and Springsteen requested DNA testing of alternative suspects. No matches against evidence discovered earlier that year were found. On Wednesday, June 24, 2009, Judge Mike Lynch ruled in response to Travis County District Attorney Rosemary Lehmberg's request that one of the trials be continued, and that defendants Springsteen and Scott be freed on bond pending their upcoming trials. At 2:50 p.m. that day, they both walked out of the Travis County Jail with their attorneys.

Later that day, Lehmberg responded to Lynch's decision with the following statement:

Today I requested a continuance in the case against Michael Scott, a defendant in the yogurt shop murders, whose trial was scheduled to begin on July 6. Judge Mike Lynch granted that motion but also released both Michael Scott and Robert Springsteen on personal bond, as he indicated he would do in his previous scheduling order.

Requesting a delay in the case was a difficult decision but one that I believe is the best course toward an ultimate successful prosecution of this important matter.

Knowing that Judge Lynch would release both defendants, we requested certain conditions on their bonds, requiring them to remain in Travis County and report to the Court any change of residence, to have no contact with the victims' families or witnesses, that they not carry weapons or consume alcohol or illegal drugs, that they report to the Court on a routine basis, and attend all court appearances.

As you know, both Springsteen and Scott were convicted by juries in June 2001 and September 2002. Their convictions were then overturned by the appellate court, but their statements to law enforcement were found to be voluntarily given.

Since the original trial of these two men, new developments in DNA technology have become available. As we prepared for retrial, in March 2008, we submitted various evidentiary items for what is called Y-STR testing. This test looks for male DNA only and is deemed to be the most accurate test for samples that are mixtures of female and male DNA, as in this case.

We sought this testing because we have an ongoing duty and responsibility to use the most up-to-date science available, to seek the truth in this and all the cases we prosecute.

Currently, it is clear to me that our evidence in the death of these four young women includes DNA from one male whose identity is not yet known to us. The defense asserts that the testing reveals more than one unknown male, but the evidence presented at the hearing on Thursday, June 18 contradicts that notion.

The reliable scientific evidence in the case presents one, and one only, unknown male donor. Given that, I could not in good conscience allow this case to go to trial before the identity of this male donor is determined, and the full truth is known. I remain confident that both Springsteen and Scott are responsible for the deaths at the yogurt shop, but it would not be prudent to risk a trial until we also know the nature of the involvement of this unknown male.

My office and the Austin Police Department remain committed to these cases. Their further investigation will continue to be a priority. My commitment to the victims, their families, and this community is that we will not give up until all of the people responsible for these terrible and tragic murders are brought to justice.

On October 28, 2009, all charges against Scott and Springsteen were dismissed.

=== Police killing of Maurice Pierce ===
After having been held in jail for nearly four years, without trial, Pierce suffered mental health issues when the charges were dropped and he was released. On December 23, 2010, Austin police officer Frank Wilson and his rookie partner, Bradley Smith, conducted a routine late night traffic stop on a vehicle driven by Pierce in the northern part of the city. After a brief pursuit on foot, Pierce struggled with Wilson before removing a knife from Wilson's belt and slashing Wilson's neck. Wilson, who would survive his injuries, subsequently pulled out his gun and shot and killed Pierce. Pierce's attorney at the time of his killing believed that he fled over the minor driving infraction (driving through a stop sign at 11 pm) because of his ingrained fear of the police once again throwing him in jail, for years, without trial.

=== Later developments and related legislation ===
On December 8, 2021, the House Judiciary Committee passed legislation from Rep. Michael McCaul giving the families of cold case victims the opportunity to petition the federal government to reexamine cases older than three years. On February 5, 2022, it was announced that advanced DNA technology was bringing investigators closer than ever to solving the Austin murders.

On August 3, 2022, the Homicide Victims' Families' Rights Act of 2021 was passed into law, which was motivated by the 1991 yogurt shop murders. The law is intended to help ensure that federal law enforcement reviews cold case files and applies the latest technologies and investigative standards. The law also states that a request can be made for a cold case review by federal agencies.

== Brashers identified as perpetrator and the four exonerated ==
On September 26, 2025, Austin police announced that Robert Eugene Brashers, a serial killer who was identified through investigative genetic genealogy by CeCe Moore in 2018, had been linked to the yogurt shop murders by DNA. Brashers died by suicide in a standoff with police in 1999. A Y-STR DNA profile was developed from vaginal swabs from three of the victims. The profile did not match any of the previous suspects; however, Brashers' Y-STR DNA profile matched. Further DNA testing revealed Brashers matched the autosomal STR profile found under the fingernails of Amy Ayers. Testing of a bullet casing found in a drain at the crime scene was consistent with patterns produced by the gun that Brashers used to commit suicide in 1999.

Under Texas law, if someone is imprisoned and later the conviction not only gets overturned, but the person is also formally declared innocent, they could get restitution of up to $80,000 for each year they were imprisoned. It is an uncommon occurrence, but the lawyers for Springsteen and Scott say that they "remain hopeful".

On February 19, 2026, Judge Dayna Blazey formally exonerated Michael Scott, Robert Springsteen, Maurice Pierce, and Forrest Welborn. The exonerees were declared factually innocent and their charges were dismissed with prejudice.

In May 2026, the Austin City Council approved a $35 million settlement to be distributed among the exonerees. The settlement awarded $9.8 million each to Scott and Springsteen, $10 million to the family of Pierce, and approximately $4.8 million to Welborn.

== In media ==
- Who Killed These Girls? Cold Case: The Yogurt Shop Murders, a 2016 nonfiction book by Beverly Lowry.
- Murdered Innocents, a 2016 nonfiction book by Corey Mitchell
- See How Small, a 2015 novel by Scott Blackwood
- WANTED: Austin Yogurt Shop Killer, a podcast episode of Crime Junkie
- People Magazine Investigates, Season 7, Episode 7, "Who Killed Our Girls?" (2023)
- The Yogurt Shop Murders, a five-part documentary released by HBO in August 2025
- Generation Why (podcast), episode 630
- Leyendas Legendarias (Podcast) episode 383

== See also ==
- Brown's Chicken massacre - Another instance where a mass shooting cold case was solved.
- Lane Bryant murders – Unsolved mass shooting at a Lane Bryant store in 2008.
- Las Cruces bowling alley massacre – Similar unsolved crime in 1990
- West Memphis Three – Men convicted of 1993 murders in Arkansas, United States

Murders in the Austin area:

- Murder of Steven Beard – Murder of a wealthy Texas retiree
- Murder of Jennifer Cave (2005) – also in West Campus
- Murders of John Goosey and Stacy Barnett – American double murder over drugs, also in West Campus
