= Robert Eugene Brashers =

American serial killer and rapist (1958–1999)

- Driver's license photo of Brashers, c. 1997
- Born: March 13, 1958; Newport News, Virginia, U.S.
- Died: January 19, 1999 (aged 40); Kennett, Missouri, U.S.
- Other names: Mr. Maroon; Jack Anthony McClelland; Gary Dean Brashers; The Yogurt Shop Killer
- Children: 1
- Status: Deceased
- Convictions: Florida; Attempted first-degree murder Aggravated battery Using a firearm during the commission of a crime Georgia; Grand theft auto Impersonating a police officer
- Penalty: Florida; 12 years imprisonment (served 3.5); Georgia; 5 years imprisonment

Details
- Victims: At least 19 victims of various violent crimes
- Span of crimes: 1985–1998
- Country: United States
- States: Florida, Kentucky, Missouri, South Carolina, Tennessee, Texas
- Killed: 8+
- Injured: 2+
- Date apprehended: 1986–1989, 1992–1997

Robert Eugene Brashers (March 13, 1958 – January 19, 1999) was an American serial killer and mass murderer who committed at least eight murders in Kentucky, Missouri, South Carolina and Texas between 1990 and 1998. During his lifetime, Brashers was convicted of attempted murder for shooting a woman in 1985, as well as for various other offenses stemming from a 1992 case in which he stole a vehicle, but was not identified as a suspect in any of his murders and remained in relative obscurity. He died by a self-inflicted gunshot wound in 1999 to avoid arrest for an unrelated crime after a standoff with police.

Decades after his death, due to advances in investigative genetic genealogy, Brashers was tied to a series of extremely violent crimes. Investigators linked him to several unsolved rapes and murders committed against women and young girls. In 2025, police in Austin, Texas, identified Brashers as the perpetrator in the 1991 Austin yogurt shop murders, in which four teenaged girls were murdered.

== Personal life ==
Robert Eugene Brashers was born on March 13, 1958, in Newport News, Virginia, the youngest of four children born to Doulis and Nellie Brashers. When he was young, Brashers' family moved to Huntsville, Alabama, where he spent his childhood and youth. Reportedly, Brashers committed no offenses as a teenager and did not engage in any substance abuse. Brashers attended S. R. Butler High School in Huntsville and John Adams High School in South Bend, Indiana. After graduating high school, he enlisted in the United States Army; he served in the United States Navy for about 10 months before being discharged due to personality disorders.

In the early 1980s, Brashers moved to Louisiana, settling in New Orleans, but by the mid-1980s he moved again to Fort Myers, Florida. He has a daughter born in 1991.

== Attempted murder of Michelle Wilkerson ==
On November 22, 1985, Brashers was arrested in Port St. Lucie, Florida, on charges of assaulting a 24-year-old woman named Michelle Wilkerson. According to investigators, on November 22, Brashers met Wilkerson in Fort Pierce and convinced her to accompany him to a bar. After spending their evening there, he took Wilkerson to a dark alleyway near a citrus grove, where, after drinking six Budweisers together, he attempted to make sexual advances toward her.

Wilkerson refused and attempted to leave Brashers' vehicle, after which a fight ensued between the pair, during which Brashers shot Wilkerson twice in the neck and head. Despite the severity of her injuries, Wilkerson remained conscious, managed to leave the car, and hid in a culvert under the road. Having lost track of her, Brashers went to the beach and threw his gun into the sea. He then attempted to leave, but his truck got stuck in the sand, causing him to start walking the streets in search of help. In the meantime, Wilkerson made her way to a nearby apartment building, where she received medical attention. Before she was driven to Lawnwood Hospital, she described her assailant and his car in detail to police officers.

A few minutes later, Brashers was apprehended while wandering the beach and charged with attempted first-degree murder, aggravated battery, and using a firearm during the commission of a crime. He was convicted the following year and sentenced to 12 years imprisonment. Under more lenient laws in place at the time of his conviction, Brashers was released from prison for good conduct on May 4, 1989. Despite his initial sentence being 12 years, he only spent a little over three years in prison for these crimes.

== Post-release crimes and posthumous exposures ==
After his release, Brashers moved between the states of South Carolina, Tennessee, and Georgia, often changing his place of residence. In 2018, genealogist CeCe Moore from Parabon NanoLabs was able to identify Brashers through investigative genetic genealogy as a suspect in three murders and several rapes dating back to 1990. In response, prosecutors from New Madrid County and Pemiscot County, Missouri, filed a motion to exhume his remains and conducted additional testing. On September 27, 2018, the casket containing Brashers' remains was exhumed from the cemetery in Paragould, Arkansas, and DNA was extracted from the bones.

DNA testing revealed that his genetic profile was a perfect match for the murderer of 28-year-old Genevieve "Jenny" Zitricki, who had been bludgeoned, raped, and strangled with pantyhose at her apartment in Greenville, South Carolina, on April 5, 1990. At the time, it was established that after murdering her in the bedroom, the killer then dragged her body into a bathtub and submerged it before writing "don't fuck with my family" on the bathroom's mirror. A DNA sample belonging to the perpetrator was isolated in 1995 and then uploaded to CODIS. Investigators were able to establish that at the time of Zitricki's murder, Brashers was living in Greenville, not far away from her home.

=== 1991 Austin yogurt shop murders ===
On the night of December 6, 1991, Brashers tied up and murdered four teenage girls, two of whom were employees, at an I Can't Believe It's Yogurt! shop in Austin, Texas, before the bodies and interior were set on fire. At least three of the victims were raped. On September 26, 2025, the Austin Police Department announced that it had identified Brashers as the perpetrator of the 1991 Austin yogurt shop murders.

A Y-STR DNA profile was developed from vaginal swabs from three of the victims. The profile did not match any of the previous suspects; however, Brashers' Y-STR DNA profile matched. Further DNA testing revealed Brashers matched the autosomal STR profile found under the fingernails of the youngest victim. Testing of a bullet casing found in a drain at the crime scene was consistent with patterns produced by the gun Brashers used to die by suicide in a standoff with police in 1999. In December 2025, the Travis County District Attorney's office filed a motion to exonerate four men who had previously been accused of committing the murders after the evidence pointing to Brashers as the perpetrator. On December 8, 1991, less than 48 hours after the Austin yogurt shop murders, Brashers was stopped by a United States Border Patrol agent at an interior checkpoint while travelling westbound on Interstate 10 between El Paso, Texas and Las Cruces, New Mexico. During the checkpoint stop, it was discovered that Brashers was driving a truck that had been reported stolen in Marietta, Georgia, on November 29. While searching the stolen vehicle, the Border Patrol agent found a .380 AMT Backup, the same make and model of firearm that had been used in the yogurt shop murders. After the discovery of the weapon, Brashers fled in the vehicle for about a mile before surrendering to law enforcement. He was charged with auto theft and felon in possession of a firearm. The gun was later released to Brashers' father after sentencing and was subsequently used by Brashers in the November 1998 murder of Linda Rutledge and in his suicide in January 1999.

On February 18, 1992, he was arrested in Cobb County, Georgia, for grand theft auto, unlawful possession of a weapon, and theft. While searching his vehicle and apartment, policemen found a radio scanner, a police jacket, lock-picking tools, and a fake Tennessee driver's license. Fearing another prison sentence, he made a plea deal with the prosecutors and pleaded guilty to the most serious of the charges, allowing for the rest to be dropped. As a result, he was sentenced to an additional five years imprisonment, which he served in full, and was released in February 1997. Following his release from prison, he moved to Paragould, Arkansas.

=== Further crimes ===
Brashers raped a 14-year-old girl in Memphis, Tennessee, on March 11, 1997. In that case, the victim and four other people were inside a home when Brashers knocked on the door and subsequently forced his way into the residence while armed with a revolver. After entering, he tied up the occupants.

DNA also linked him to the double murder of 38-year-old Sherri Scherer and her 12-year-old daughter Megan, both of whom were found shot to death at their home in Portageville, Missouri, on March 28, 1998. Both victims had been tied up, and Megan had been raped before Brashers shot and killed both of them with a .22 caliber gun. Approximately two hours later, he broke into another home in Dyersburg, Tennessee, where he attempted to assault a 25-year-old woman. That victim fiercely resisted, however, causing her assailant to flee the crime scene. There was no useful biological evidence left behind, but forensic ballistics were able to prove that the same gun had been used in this attack as with the murders of the Scherers.

On April 12, 1998, Brashers was arrested while attempting to break into the home of a woman in Paragould, Arkansas. Having been employed by her on a previous occasion, he had cut the phone line leading to her home and was armed at the time of his arrest. A video camera and locksmithing tools were seized from him as well. Brashers was taken into custody, but was later released after he posted his bail.

On August 16, 1998, Brashers was arrested and charged with residential burglary, leaving the scene of an accident with property damage, public intoxication, and second-degree criminal impersonation in Greene County, Arkansas. The charges stemmed from Brashers driving erratically on U.S. Highway 412 when he crashed his van through a fence, hit a parked vehicle, and fled the scene. A motorist subsequently contacted law enforcement after he had given an injured Brashers a ride to U.S. Highway 412. When Brashers was located in the area by police officers, he provided a false identity and a fictitious story. During the investigation, it was discovered that Brashers had also burglarized his neighbor's home and stolen cash and jewelry. The following October, Arkansas authorities issued a warrant for his arrest, as the new charges caused the bond in his April case to be revoked. Two additional arrest warrants were issued in November, the latter of which was due to failure to appear in court on November 12.

On November 7, 1998, around 7:40 am, the Lexington Fire Department in Lexington, KY, was dispatched to the Nixon Hearing Aid Center in the 100 block of Malabu Drive for a structure fire. When crews arrived at the scene, they observed heavy smoke coming from the business and made entry. The fire was extinguished quickly, and a female victim was located deceased in the back hallway. The Fayette County Coroner's Office identified the victim as 43-year-old Linda Marie Rutledge. Her cause of death was determined to be multiple gunshot wounds to the head. In September 2025, Brashers was announced to have been the perpetrator of a murder in Kentucky in which a woman was raped and fatally shot. On January 7, 2026, the victim was publicly identified as 43-year-old Linda Rutledge.

In July 2025, detectives were contacted by the Austin, TX Police Department after they received a match from the National Integrated Ballistic Information Network (NIBIN) regarding the .380 shell casing that was recovered from the Nixon Hearing Aid Center. The .380 shell casing was a match to one that was located in Austin in December 1991 after the "Yogurt Shop Murders". In addition to the ballistic evidence, DNA evidence from both cases was also a match. In September 2025, a sexual assault kit from Rutledge was sent to DNA Labs International for testing and matched the profile from Austin, further implicating Brashers as the perpetrator.

In February 2019, Brashers' 27-year-old daughter Deborah was interviewed by reporters to recount some details of her father's biography. She said that she first saw her father in early 1997, after he had just been released from prison. According to her, for the next two years he lived with her, her mother, and her half-sisters. During this time, she claimed that he was sometimes aggressive towards them; he once fought her stepfather and caused him a head injury with a drill; he had also made a tape recording of himself making small cuts on his neck and arm with a saw to see if he could withstand the pain. Deborah was inclined to believe that her mother Dorothy, who died in December 2018 at the age of 53, knew about her father's past activities, telling them to call him by a different name and to keep him inside the house.

In addition, she stated that his mental health sharply deteriorated circa April 1998 and that his job at a construction firm led him to be absent from the house for weeks at a time.

== Death ==
On January 13, 1999, police officers noticed that a stolen vehicle had been parked in the parking lot of the Super 8 hotel in Kennett, Missouri. After speaking with motel personnel, it was established that Brashers and his family had arrived in that vehicle just days earlier. Officers then broke down the door and found him hiding under a bed with a loaded gun, but when they attempted to arrest him, he put the gun to his head and threatened to kill himself. The officers were forced to retreat and called for backup.

Within a few minutes, the motel grounds were surrounded with police cars, while Brashers took his wife, daughter, and two stepdaughters hostage. He released his family and then after four hours of negotiations, shot himself in the head. He remained alive for six more days but succumbed to complications from his injuries on January 19. His death was later ruled a suicide.

== List of confirmed victims ==
Name	Age	Date	Location	Details
Michelle Wilkerson	24	November 22, 1985	Fort Pierce, Florida	Attempted murder
Genevieve Zitricki	28	April 5, 1990	Greenville, South Carolina	Murder, rape
Amy Ayers	13	December 6, 1991	Austin, Texas	Murder, rape
Eliza Thomas	17	December 6, 1991	Austin, Texas	Murder, rape
Jennifer Harbison	17	December 6, 1991	Austin, Texas	Murder, rape
Sarah Harbison	15	December 6, 1991	Austin, Texas	Murder, rape
Unnamed female and four family members	14 (female victim), various ages (family)	March 11, 1997	Memphis, Tennessee	Rape (female), hostage-taking (family)
Megan Scherer	12	March 28, 1998	Portageville, Missouri	Murder, rape
Sherri Scherer	38	March 28, 1998	Portageville, Missouri	Murder
Unnamed female	25	March 28, 1998	Dyersburg, Tennessee	Attempted assault
Linda Marie Rutledge	43	November 7, 1998	Lexington, Kentucky	Murder, rape
Brashers' family members	Various ages	January 13, 1999	Kennett, Missouri	Hostage-taking

== Media ==
- In June 2019, the Zitricki and Scherer murders were profiled on an episode of On the Case with Paula Zahn.
- In June 2020, CeCe Moore recounted Brashers' identification through investigative genetic genealogy on the ABC series The Genetic Detective, which featured Brashers' daughter Deborah.
- In September 2021, Brashers' daughter Deborah was interviewed about her father on an episode of Evil Lives Here.

=== Austin yogurt shop murders ===
- Who Killed These Girls? Cold Case: The Yogurt Shop Murders, a 2016 nonfiction book by Beverly Lowry
- Murdered Innocents, a 2016 nonfiction book by Corey Mitchell
- See How Small, a 2015 novel by Scott Blackwood
- People Magazine Investigates, Season 7, Episode 7, "Who Killed Our Girls?" (2023)
- The Yogurt Shop Murders, a five-part documentary released by HBO in August 2025

== See also ==
- List of serial killers in the United States
- Bruce Lindahl, American posthumously discovered serial killer and rapist
