= Dossier =

A dossier is a collection of papers or other sources, containing detailed information about a particular person or subject.

Dossier can also refer to:

== Arts, entertainment, and media ==
- Dossier the journal of Women Living Under Muslim Laws organization
- Dossier 51, a 1978 film based on a book of the same name
- Dossier Journal, an independently published and owned bi-annual arts and culture journal
- The Miernik Dossier, first of seven novels by American novelist Charles McCarry

== Specific dossiers ==
- Farewell Dossier, documents that a KGB defector gave to the French DST in 1981–82
- Iraq Dossier, a 2003 briefing document for the British Labour Party government concerning Iraq and weapons of mass destruction
- September Dossier, a document published by the British government on 24 September 2002 concerning weapons of mass destruction (WMD) in Iraq
- Steele dossier, a dossier containing allegations of a conspiracy between Trump's 2016 campaign and the Russian government, sometimes known as the "Trump–Russia dossier"
- Westminster paedophile dossier, a dossier on paedophiles allegedly associated with the British government

== Other uses ==
- Dossier criminal, a term used by Indian police forces to classify criminals
- Global Dossier, an online public service launched in June 2014 by the five Intellectual Property offices
- Dang'an, a dossier held by local party officials in the People's Republic of China containing the personal details and record of every citizen.
- Dossier: The Secret History of Armand Hammer, a 1996 book by Edward Jay Epstein

== See also ==
- Black Dossier (disambiguation)
