= James Edward Butler =

American justice activist, planter, and merchant (1843–1913)

James Edward Butler (May 20, 1843 – July 23, 1913) was an American justice of the peace, planter, and merchant in Alabama.

Butler was born May 20, 1843, in Poplar Ridge, Alabama, the son of Canada Butler. He served in the Confederate Army, was captured in 1864, and was held at Camp Chase in Ohio until 1865. He married Nancy Jane Nichols, and they had several children. Their son William Edward Butler served in the Alabama Senate in 1919 and 1920.

He was a witness for Joseph Wheeler in the investigation of the November 2, 1880, election contested by William M. Lowe.

After the civil war he entered business in New Hope, Alabama, running a large general supply store for years, and by the time of his death he was the head of the Butler-Kyser Oil Company. He had also been in the common trade and in 1909 sold 3000 bales worth $141,000, (~$3.51 million in 2024), which was a large sale for the time. He was not new to large sales of cotton, with previous sales being noted in 1904 of 1400 bales and in 1906 of 1300 bales.

Butler died at home in New Hope on July 23, 1913, after being taken ill whilst at a Confederate reunion a few weeks earlier, followed by rapid deterioration of health. He was survived by his wife and eight children, five daughters and three sons. His final will had been made days before his death whilst sick, and his estate was estimated to be around $350,000 (~$8.15 million in 2024). James Edward Butler was the uncle of Samuel Riley Butler, who served as the county superintendent of education and was the namesake of the S. R. Butler High School.
