= James Hyde (artist) =

American painter

- Born: James Hyde; 1958 (age 67–68); Philadelphia, Pennsylvania, US
- Years active: Early 1980s–present
- Works: James Hyde Website
- Awards: the Guggenheim Foundation Fellowship in 2008, the Pollock-Krasner Grant in 2011, the Joan-Mitchell Foundation Fellowship in 2000, and the New York State CAPS Grant in 1982

James Hyde (born 1958 in Philadelphia, Pennsylvania) is an American painter, sculptor and photographer who has worked in New York City since the early 1980s. He has works in the collection of the Museum of Modern Art and the Guggenheim Museum and has exhibited at the Brooklyn Museum and the Corcoran Gallery of Art in Washington D.C.

== Overview ==
Hyde often employs unconventional materials when painting that range from plaster, nylon, chrome, steel to styrofoam and glass. His practice has been described as an "exploration of physicality" in his experimentations with different textures and planes that often re-evaluate and expand the limits and boundaries of painting.

Hyde describes his work in saying:

I think painting is never entirely about being a painted object, nor a medium in the narrow sense. I think painting is, as well, a symbolic and allegorical situation that happens to be made by a particular medium and set of materials. And really as a painter I've tried to put pressure on what a painting is and rethink it in different ways. And that's how I end up with such different ways of looking at various possibilities, especially in terms of abstract painting.

In 2003 he started to incorporate photography into his work while maintaining his use of alternative materials acquired from his work as a general contractor in the late 1970s.

== Technique ==
When asked about his technique as an artist, Hyde says:

Minimalism is where I really came from, what I looked at, and what I thought about; but I was less interested in the grid as a type of compositional device than as serialization and repetition. The grid was just a means for placing those fresco panels and repeating them in a way that doesn't involve notions of space, which I've never been interested in. Repetition allowed a sequential logic—a music of visual information.

Hyde's work often involves a number of alternative materials that he has incorporated into his minimalist paintings, sometimes creating three-dimensional pieces that explore new planes and arrangements.

== Early career ==
Hyde arrived as a teenager in New York City in 1977. Although he had already begun his artistic practice he had, for a time early in his career, rejected showing his work within the art world out of a "frustration of what was being shown", instead devoting much of his time to his work as a general contractor. Hyde began to integrate himself more within the art world in the early 1980s.

== Awards ==
Hyde is a recipient of the Guggenheim Foundation Fellowship in 2008, the Pollock-Krasner Grant in 2011, the Joan-Mitchell Foundation Fellowship in 2000 and the New York State CAPS Grant in 1982

== Press Mentions ==
After his influential investigations of paintings as objects of some bulk, Mr. Hyde returns to flatness. Now structure is provided by digital photographs – all taken by the artist and often printed quite large – of half-built structures, construction sites, clouds, trees, close-ups of the human hand and a single flower. Appended with strips of tape, painted shapes and bits of painted wood on Styrofoam, these works function like drawings. They show how Mr. Hyde thinks and what he looks at, something of his working process, and above all his desire to avoid ruts.

— Roberta Smith, "James Hyde: Unbuilt," The New York Times, April 24, 2009.

Artists that have twenty or thirty years of art practice behind them almost invariably reveal and intensify their primary interests. In the case of James Hyde this would seem to be both true and not true when one studies his output. There is progress but the progression seems to form an ellipse: the same calm confidence has existed in the work all along as he easily and often combines various artworks from past exhibitions with more recent ones. This takes place in Hyde's current exhibition, where he has included at least one sculptural type "Pandora", (enamel on cast aluminum hybrid) from 2003 that typically traverses the pictorial and the sculptural. What is newly revealed is that Hyde is a more far-ranging investigator than many might have thought.

— Joe Fyfe, "James Hyde at the Villa du Parc," 2010.

Painted in the language of abstraction, but never conforming to stylistic conventions, Hyde's colored papier-mache rectangles and broad swaths of paint alternately cover, dissolve into and call attention to sections of the photograph beneath. This exhibition of painting on photographs brings the object sharply into focus–Hyde knows well that putting paint on the surface of a photograph not only erases the veracity of the image, but magnifies the interplay between image and surface, and by obstructing our view of the photograph and complicating our view of the painting, he allows us to see both more clearly, with the style, energy and inventiveness that we have come to expect from him. The photographs, which support these paintings, depict both the natural world and the urban built environment; several pictures show buildings in various stages of completion, all without a skin, giving us a view into the structure ... Hyde, who in a former life earned his income as a contractor, clearly understands the language of construction. The mechanics of building after all is not so different from the mechanics of seeing, and in this exhibition Hyde-as-architect has given us a new city, one built from, and on top of, photographs; a city that honors the brick and allows us to see not only the method of construction but the substance of it.

— Irving Evans, "The Hydes of March," Dossier Journal, March 17, 2009.

"As a painter", Hyde says, "I'm concerned with the processes of how painting is constructed and recognized. I try to keep this narrative legible – making the actions of coating, covering, marking, or folding distinct as gestures so that they are both an action and a description of an action." For this reason, Hyde focuses on the greatest possible tension between the heterogeneity of the single image components and the unity of the pictorial-painterly effect. Hyde maximizes the tension between heterogeneity and homogeneity. This means that he is not interested with only the one or the other, but in the transfer between the two; in the possibility that as things drift apart they might transform into something belonging together only to fall apart into singular elements a moment later ...

— Michael Lüthy, translated from German, "James Hyde," Schau Ort exhibition publication, March 2011.
