= Poplar Ridge =

Poplar Ridge may refer to the following places:

- Poplar Ridge, New York, a hamlet in Cayuga County, New York, United States
- Poplar Ridge, Ohio, an unincorporated community
- Poplar Ridge, Alabama, a former community in Alabama
- Poplar Ridge, Alberta, a hamlet in Alberta, Canada
