= Kenneth McDuff =

American serial killer (1946–1998)

- 1978 mugshot
- Born: March 21, 1946; Rosebud, Texas, U.S.
- Died: November 17, 1998 (aged 52); Huntsville Unit, Texas, U.S.
- Other names: The Broomstick Murderer; The Broomstick Killer
- Status: Executed by lethal injection
- Convictions: Burglary (1965); Attempted burglary (1965); Murder with malice (1968); Capital murder (1993)
- Penalty: 4 years (1965); Death, commuted to life with parole (1968); Death (1993)

Details
- Victims: 9–14+
- Span of crimes: August 6, 1966 – March 1, 1992
- Country: United States
- State: Texas
- Date apprehended: For the final time: May 4, 1992

Kenneth Allen McDuff (March 21, 1946 – November 17, 1998) was an American serial killer from Texas. In 1966, McDuff and an accomplice kidnapped and murdered three teenagers who were visiting from California. He was given three death sentences for these crimes but avoided execution after the 1972 U.S. Supreme Court ruling Furman v. Georgia. He was resentenced to life and was paroled in 1989. Between October 1989 and March 1992, McDuff raped and murdered at least six women, receiving another death sentence, and was later executed in 1998.

== Early life and background ==
Kenneth Allen McDuff was raised on 201 Linden Street in the central Texas town of Rosebud, the fifth of six children born to John Allen "JA" and Addie McDuff. His father ran a successful concrete business during the Texas construction boom of the 1960s. McDuff was indulged by his family, particularly his mother Addie, nicknamed the "pistol-packing mama" because she threatened a school bus driver with a gun after the driver kicked McDuff's twin brother Lonnie off the bus.

At Rosebud High School, McDuff earned the reputation of being a bully. He was careful to pick on weaker individuals after losing a fight he had started with an athletic and popular boy named Tommy Sammons. As a result, he quit school and worked for his father's business doing manual labor. McDuff would often brag in later interviews that old ladies loved how he mowed their lawns, making others jealous. McDuff was convicted of a series of burglaries and put in prison.

== Earlier criminal activities ==
McDuff's criminal record began two years before his first murder conviction. In 1964, at age 18, McDuff was convicted of 12 counts of burglary and attempted burglary in three Texas counties: Bell, Milam, and Falls. He was sentenced to 12 four-year prison terms to be served concurrently. He made parole in December 1965.

McDuff briefly returned to prison after becoming involved in a fight but was soon released. While he had not been convicted of any murders at this time, his accomplice in the 1966 triple murder, Roy Dale Green, said that McDuff bragged openly about his criminal record and claimed to have raped and killed two young women.

== Broomstick murders ==
On August 6, 1966, McDuff and Green, whom he had met around a month earlier through a mutual acquaintance, spent the day pouring concrete for McDuff's father. They then drove around, as McDuff said he was looking for a girl. At 10 pm, Robert Brand (aged 17), his girlfriend Edna Louise Sullivan (aged 16), and Brand's 15-year-old cousin Mark Dunnam were standing beside their parked car on a baseball field in Everman, Texas.

While cruising around, McDuff noticed Sullivan and parked around 150 yards away from the soon-to-be victims. He threatened the trio with his .38 Colt revolver and ordered them to get into the trunk of their car. With Green following in McDuff's car, McDuff drove the victims' Ford along a highway and then into a field, where he ordered Sullivan out of the trunk of the Ford and instructed Green to put her into the trunk of his Dodge Coronet. At this point, according to Green's statement, McDuff said he would have to "knock 'em off"; he proceeded to fire six shots into the trunk of the Ford despite Dunnam and Brand's pleas not to. McDuff then instructed Green to wipe the fingerprints off the Ford.

After driving to another location, McDuff and Green, the latter allegedly under duress, raped Sullivan. After she was raped repeatedly, McDuff asked Green for something with which to strangle her. Green gave him his belt. However, in the end, McDuff opted to use a 3-foot-long (0.91 m) piece of broomstick from his car. He choked Sullivan, and then Green and he dumped her body in some bushes. They purchased Coca-Cola from a Hillsboro gas station before driving to Green's house to spend the night. The following day, McDuff buried his revolver beside Green's garage, and their mutual acquaintance Richard Boyd allowed McDuff to wash his car at his house. The next day, Green confessed to Boyd's parents, who told Green's mother, who convinced him to turn himself in. McDuff was arrested by Falls County Sheriff Albert Brady Pamplin (who served with Texas Rangers before serving in World War II with United States Army Air Corps) and Deputy U.S. Marshal Thomas Parnell “T.P.” McNamara Sr.

McDuff received a death sentence in Texas' electric chair; Green received a 25-year sentence and was released in 1979. McDuff's death sentence was commuted to a life sentence, and he hired a lawyer, who amassed a dossier of various evidence that claimed to show that Green was the real killer. Some members of the parole board were impressed by the dossier. During a one-on-one interview with a board member, McDuff offered him a bribe to secure a favorable decision on the parole application. He was given a two-year sentence for trying to bribe the official. It proved meaningless, as board members thought McDuff could still "contribute to society" and decided to grant him parole. He was released in 1989.

== Post-release crimes ==
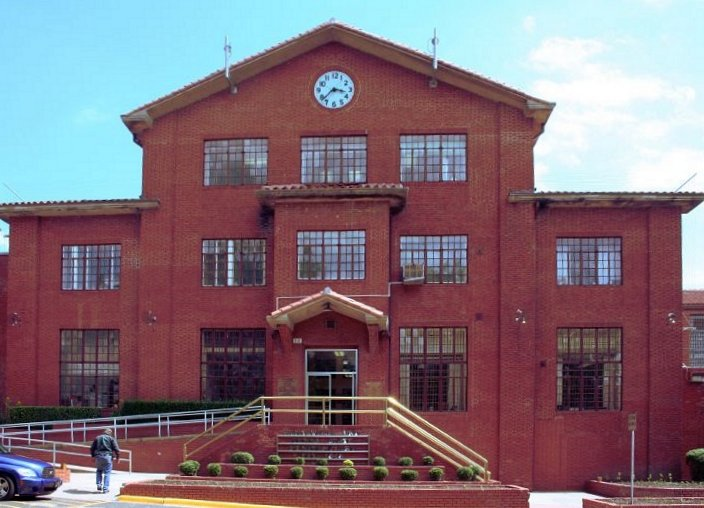
Huntsville Unit, the location of the Texas execution chamber

McDuff was one of 20 former death-row inmates and 127 murderers to be paroled. After being released, he got a job at a gas station making $4 an hour while taking a class at Texas State Technical College in Waco. Within three days of his release, he is widely believed to have begun killing again. The body of 29-year-old Sarafia Parker was discovered on October 14, 1989, in Temple, a town 48 miles south of Waco along the I-35 corridor. McDuff was not charged with this crime. However, he was soon returned to prison on a parole violation for making death threats to an African American youth in Rosebud.

Addie McDuff paid $1,500, plus an additional $700 for expenses, to two Huntsville attorneys in return for their "evaluating" her son's prospect of release. On December 18, 1990, McDuff was again released from prison. On the night of October 10, 1991, he picked up a sex worker named Brenda Thompson in Waco. He tied her up but then stopped his truck about 50 ft from a police checkpoint. When a policeman walked toward McDuff's vehicle, Thompson repeatedly kicked at the windshield of McDuff's truck, cracking it several times.

McDuff accelerated very quickly and drove at the officers. According to a statement filed by the officers later, three had to jump to avoid being hit. The police officers gave chase, but McDuff eluded them by turning off his lights and traveling the wrong way down one-way streets. Ultimately, he parked his truck in a wooded area near U.S. Route 84 and tortured Thompson to death. Her body was not discovered until 1998.

Five days later, on October 15, 1991, McDuff and a 21-year-old sex worker named Regenia DeAnne Moore were witnessed arguing at a Waco motel. Shortly thereafter, the pair drove in McDuff's pickup truck to a remote area beside Texas State Highway 6, near Waco. McDuff tied her arms and legs with stockings before killing her. She had been missing from home for seven years by the time her body was discovered on September 29, 1998.

McDuff, along with an accomplice, Alva Hank Worley, kidnapped and murdered Colleen Reed, a Louisiana native, on December 29, 1991. While McDuff and Worley were driving around Austin they drove past an Austin car wash, where McDuff saw Reed. According to Worley, McDuff stated he was going to kidnap her. McDuff then pulled into the car wash and parked behind Reed's car wash bay, jumping out of the car, grabbing Colleen by the throat, and pulling her into the backseat. He then instructed Worley to take off; all of this occurred in plain sight of eyewitnesses.

Bell County Deputy Sheriff Tim Steglich got information from Texas DOC investigator John Moriarty that McDuff had an acquaintance by the name of Hank Worley. The investigators found that McDuff liked to pick Worley up and that they would ride around together. Through research, Deputy Sheriff Steglich found that Worley had a civil hearing in April 1992, where Steglich was able to catch Worley on his way out of court and ask to talk to him, to which Worley agreed. Steglich didn't get much from that interview, but suspected Worley wasn't being honest and noted that he was very nervous during the interview. To develop trust with Worley, Steglich went to visit him several times where he lived.

One evening, he received a call from Worley, who said that he needed to speak to Steglich. Steglich immediately went to pick Worley up. Worley walked up to Steglich's car, stating that he "was with McDuff when he took that girl in Austin." Worley then asked if he could say goodbye to his daughter, as he knew he wouldn't be coming back, and left with Steglich. At the Bell County Sheriff's Department, Worley went on to tell his story of that night.

Worley admitted that he drove the car for the kidnapping. He stated that he and McDuff originally went to Austin to “get bent” (slang for getting high), but that while driving around, McDuff saw Colleen Reed and decided he wanted her. McDuff proceeded to kidnap Reed, while Worley drove around Austin before going North on the I-35 while McDuff bound Reed's hands with shoelaces, then tortured her with cigarettes and raped her in the backseat. Worley stated that her screams were so loud that they had "hurt his ears." When questioned by the investigators as to why he didn't seek assistance or try to help her, even as Reed begged him for help, he claimed that it was because he was terrified of McDuff.

McDuff instructed Worley to drive to a field about 200 to 300 yards from McDuff's parent's home in Bell County, where McDuff dragged Reed out of the car and hit her in the face with such force that “it was like a tree limb breaking”, upon which she went limp. McDuff then put her in the trunk and instructed Worley to get in the car, where McDuff drove Worley back to his apartment; this was the last time he saw either McDuff or Colleen Reed. Worley told investigators he believed that McDuff had murdered and buried Colleen Reed somewhere in the area of Bell County.

McDuff's next victim was Valencia Joshua, a sex worker who was last seen alive knocking on McDuff's door. He strangled Joshua on February 24, 1992. Her body was discovered on March 15 at a golf course near their college. Next was Melissa Northrup, a 22-year-old store clerk at a Waco Quik-Pak which McDuff had worked in at one point, who was pregnant when she went missing from the store. The kidnapper also took $250 from the cash register. McDuff was a suspect because he had been seen in the vicinity of the Quik-Pak at the time of Northrup's disappearance. During the investigation, before the body was found, a college friend of McDuff's told police officers that he had attempted to enlist his help in robbing the store. Northrup died on March 1, 1992, and a fisherman found her body on April 26.

A major problem for investigators was that McDuff's post-release victims were spread out across several Texas counties. This made a single coordinated investigation difficult. However, the police learned that McDuff was peddling drugs and was in possession of an illegal firearm, both federal offenses. Consequently, on March 6, 1992, a local state attorney issued a warrant for his arrest. In April 1992, Bell County investigators had brought in Worley for questioning because he was a known acquaintance of McDuff's. Worley admitted to his involvement in the kidnapping of Reed. He was held in a Travis County jail while the police continued their search for McDuff.

McDuff had moved to Kansas City, Missouri, where he was working at a refuse collection company and living under the assumed name of Richard Fowler. On May 1, 1992, a coworker of his named Gary Smithee watched the Fox television program America's Most Wanted. Smithee noticed how similar McDuff, featured on the program, was to his new coworker. After discussing the matter with another coworker, Smithee telephoned the Kansas City Police Department, which searched Fowler's name and found he had been arrested and fingerprinted for soliciting sex workers. A comparison of the fingerprints taken from Fowler to those of McDuff showed they were the same. On May 4, 1992, a surveillance team of six officers arrested McDuff as he drove to a landfill south of Kansas City. The arresting officers included Deputy U.S. Marshal Thomas Parnell McNamara Jr., his brother, Deputy U.S. Marshal Mike McNamara, and Falls County Sheriff Larry Pamplin, whose fathers had arrested McDuff in 1966.

== Victims ==
Name	Age	Death Date	Details of Murder
Robert Brand	17	August 6, 1966	He was kidnapped with Mark Dunnam and Edna Sullivan. He was forced into the trunk of his car with Mark before McDuff fired six shots into it.
Johnny Marcus Dunnam	15	August 6, 1966	He was kidnapped with Robert Brand and Edna Sullivan. He was forced into the trunk of Robert's car with Robert before McDuff fired six shots into it.
Edna Louise Sullivan	16	August 6, 1966	She was kidnapped, repeatedly raped by McDuff and Green, and strangled with a broomstick so violently it broke her neck. Her body was dumped in some bushes.
Sarafia Parker	29	October 13 or 14, 1989	She was beaten, strangled, and dumped in a field.
Brenda Thompson	36	October 10, 1991	She was tied up, raped, and tortured to death. She almost escaped when she kicked at and cracked McDuff's windshield in front of a police checkpoint, but McDuff evaded police.
Regenia DeAnne Moore	21	October 15, 1991	She was tied up with stockings, raped, and murdered.
Colleen Reed	28	December 29, 1991	She was kidnapped in plain sight from an Austin car wash by McDuff and Worley. Both repeatedly raped her and tortured her with cigarettes before McDuff murdered her.
Valencia Joshua	22	February 24, 1992	She was strangled to death and found at a golf course near Texas State Technical College in Waco (where both she and McDuff were students).
Melissa Northrup	22	March 1, 1992	

== Trial and execution ==
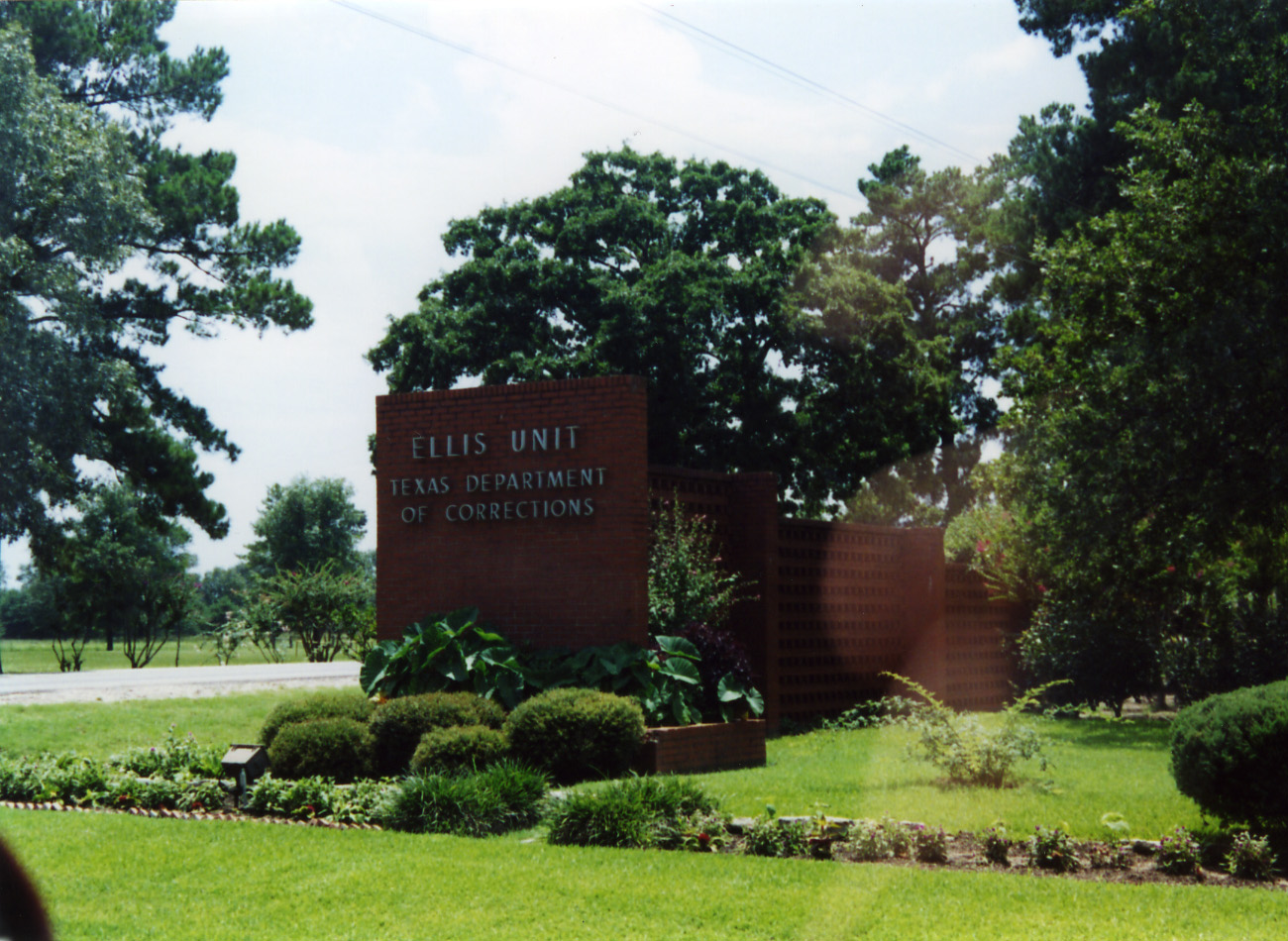
Ellis Unit, the location of the Texas men's death row at the time of McDuff's incarceration

McDuff was indicted on one count of capital murder for Northrup's murder in McLennan County, Texas, on June 26, 1992. He was found guilty. In Texas, juries determine whether or not an individual convicted of capital murder receives life imprisonment or the death penalty. Journalist Gary Cartwright expressed the hope he would be executed, saying: "If there has ever been a good argument for the death penalty, it's Kenneth McDuff."

On February 18, 1993, the jury, in a special punishment hearing, opted to sentence him to death. Following several delays while appeals were heard, the Western District Court denied habeas corpus relief and rescheduled the execution date for November 17, 1998. As he was denied authorization for another, he gave up Reed's burial location a few weeks before his execution.

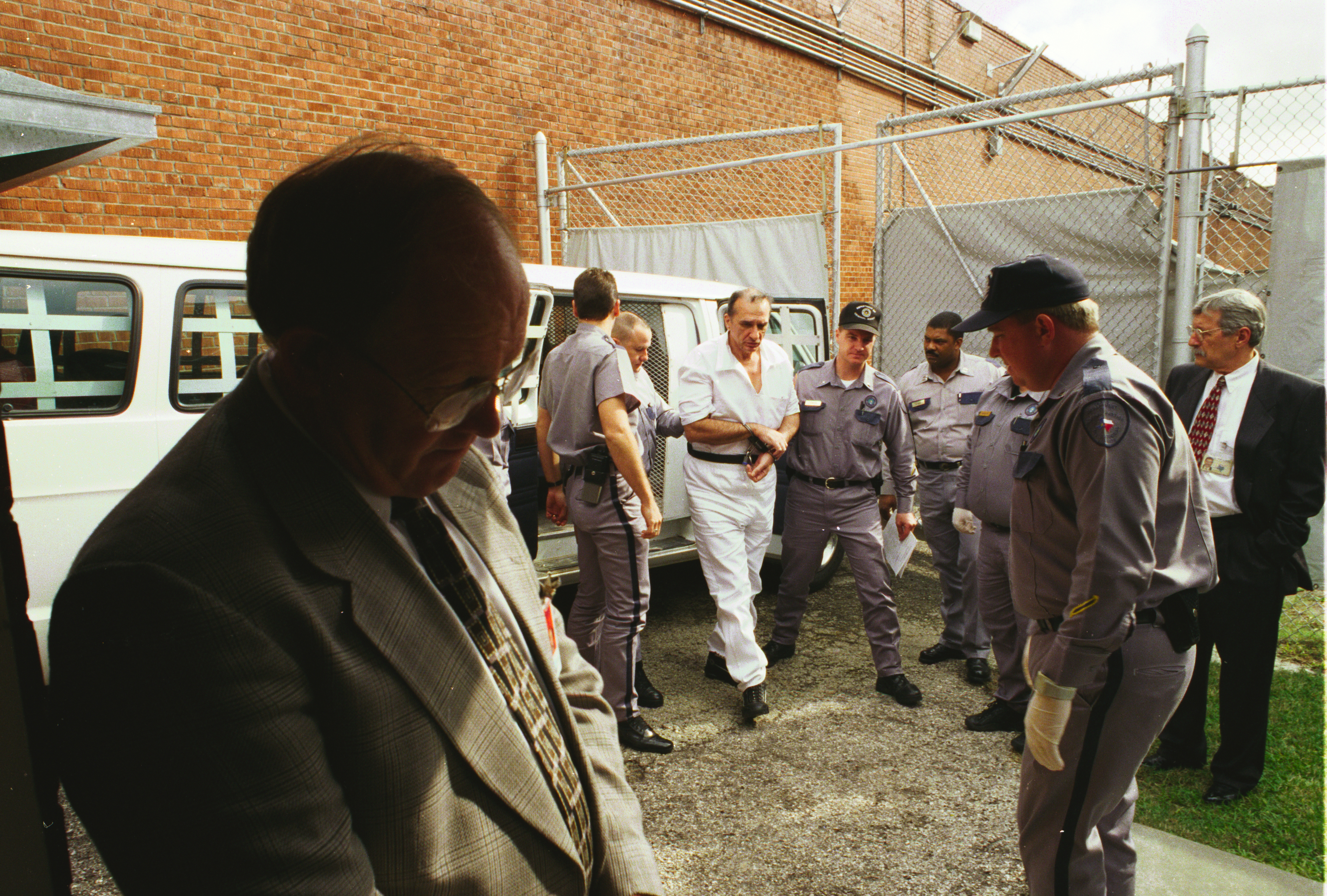
McDuff being escorted into the Texas Death House

McDuff is buried in the Captain Joe Byrd Cemetery, also known as "Peckerwood Hill", in Huntsville, Texas. Prisoners buried there are those whose families chose not to claim their remains. His headstone contains only his date of execution (11-17-98), an "X" (meaning that the State of Texas executed him), and his death row number (999055).

== See also ==
- Capital punishment in Texas
- Capital punishment in the United States
- 1995 Okinawa rape incident
- List of people executed in Texas, 1990–1999
- List of people executed in the United States in 1998
- List of serial killers by number of victims
- List of serial killers in the United States

== Bibliography ==
- Lavergne, Gary M. (1999). Bad Boy from Rosebud. University of North Texas Press. ISBN 9781574410723.
- Bob Stewart (1996). No Remorse. Kensington Publishing Corporation. ISBN 978-0-7860-0231-3.
- Christopher Berry-Dee (May 23, 2003). Talking with Serial Killers: The Most Evil People in the World Tell Their Own Stories. John Blake Publishing. ISBN 978-1-84358-617-3.
