= Alex Wiederin =

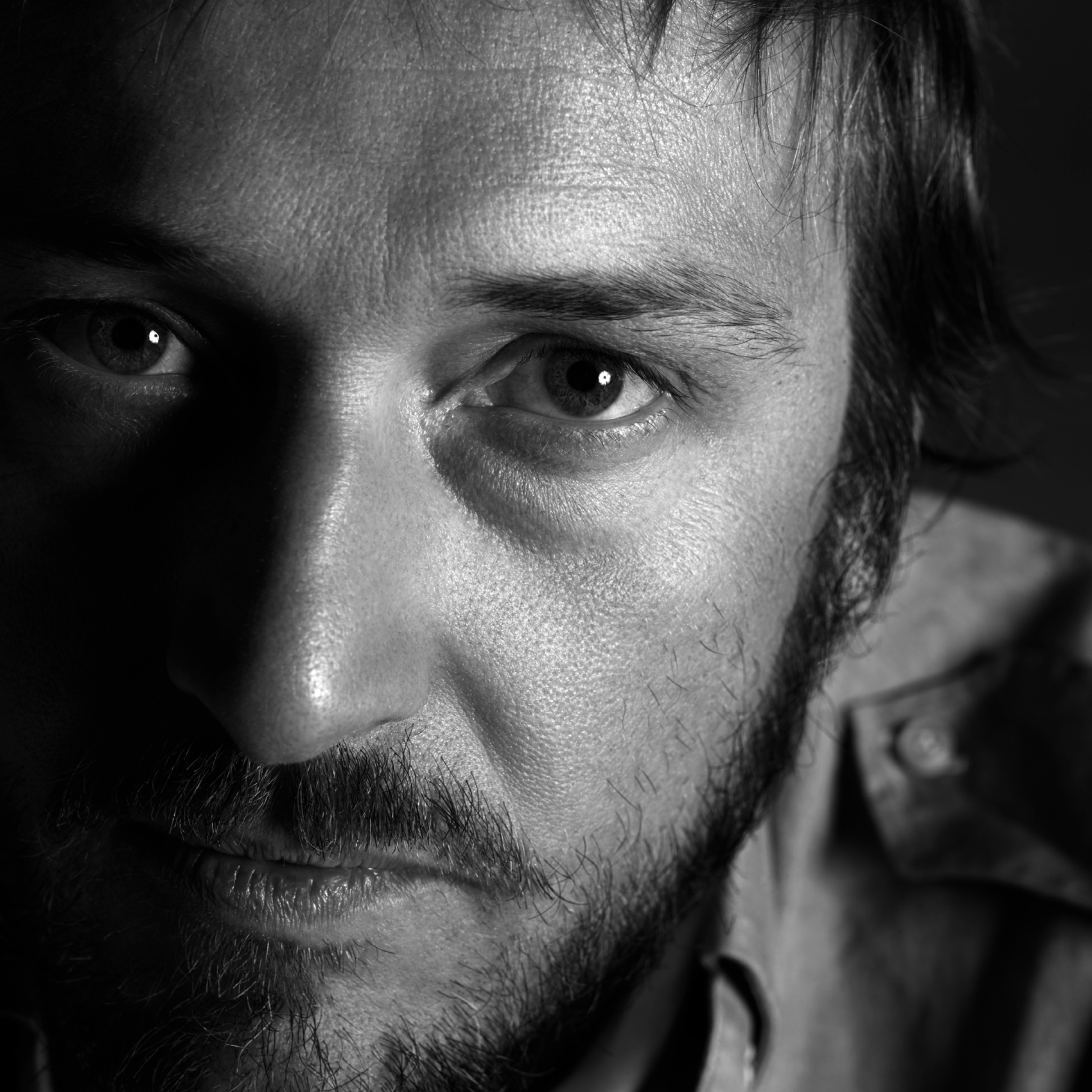
- Wiederin in 2011
- Born: January 24, 1971 (age 55); Feldkirch, Vorarlberg, Austria
- Known for: Graphic Design, Creative Director

Alex Wiederin (born January 24, 1971) is a New York-based creative director, graphic designer and typefont designer. He was the Executive Design Director of Town & Country Magazine and served as creative director of Italian Elle, AnOther Magazine, 10 Magazine, Vogue Hommes International, Glamour Italy, Departures, Dossier Journal, and BIG Magazine, among others.

== Biography ==
=== Early life ===
At the age of 16 Alex Wiederin was working as an intern for German Zeitgeist magazine Tempo, part of German-language New Journalism. Years later he became art director of the publication. At Tempo he collaborated with upcoming and established photographers, including Wolfgang Tillmans, Terry Richardson, Marcello Krasilcic, Bettina Rheims and Paul Schirnhofer.

=== 1990s ===
In 1997, Jane Pratt invited Wiederin to New York City to design the prototype of Jane Magazine. During this time, Wiederin collaborated with photographers Bruce Davidson, Steven Sebring and Luis Sanchis. Later on, Wiederin worked as creative director at A/R Media with Alex Gonzales and Raul Martinez for clients such as Valentino, Versace, Lanvin, Cesare Paciotti and Missoni.

=== 2000s ===
In 2001, Alex Wiederin co-founded AnOther Magazine, a bi-annual culture and fashion magazine, with Jefferson Hack and worked with many renowned photographers, including Nick Knight, David Sims, Inez van Lamsweerde and Vinoodh Matadin and Helmut Newton. Later that same year, Wiederin founded Buero New York, a creative agency and think-tank for creative talents and photographers. In 2002, Wiederin redesigned Dazed & Confused, a famous British style magazine founded by Jefferson Hack and fashion photographer Rankin.

In 2003, Italian Glamour hired Alex Wiederin as their creative director. Two years later, Alex Wiederin became the creative director of BIG Magazine for issue 58 with Lauren Hutton. The same year, Dietrich Mateschitz, founder of Red Bull, hired Wiederin as a creative director to relaunch Seitenblicke, Austria's leading entertainment magazine.

While working with Red Bull, Alex Wiederin created a Formula 1 magazine: The Red Bulletin - “The Fastest Magazine In The World”, written, assembled and printed in the paddock at each race. The publication covered stories from the inner sanctum of Formula 1, setting a new standard for quality in high-speed production.

In 2006 Alex Wiederin designed a number of stores for Helmut Lang in Los Angeles, San Francisco, New York and Tokyo. One year later Annie Leibovitz teamed up with Alex Wiederin to design an advertising campaign for Parisian couture house Nina Ricci.

In 2008 Wiederin became creative director for 10 Magazine and 10 Men, he redesigned both publications. Since then, Alex Wiederin has been the creative director of ELLE Italia. In 2009 Vogue Hommes International hired Wiederin as their creative director.

=== 2010s ===
In 2011, Alex Wiederin designed the book “Carine Roitfeld: Irreverent”, a visual history of the former editor-in-chief of Vogue Paris.

In 2012 and 2013, Wiederin was put in charge of designing the Pirelli Calendar, a famous annual publication for important Pirelli customers and celebrity VIPs. The 2012 calendar was shot by Mario Sorrenti.

In the following year, Wiederin collaborated with photographer Steve McCurry.
