= CeCe Moore =

American genetic genealogist (born 1969)

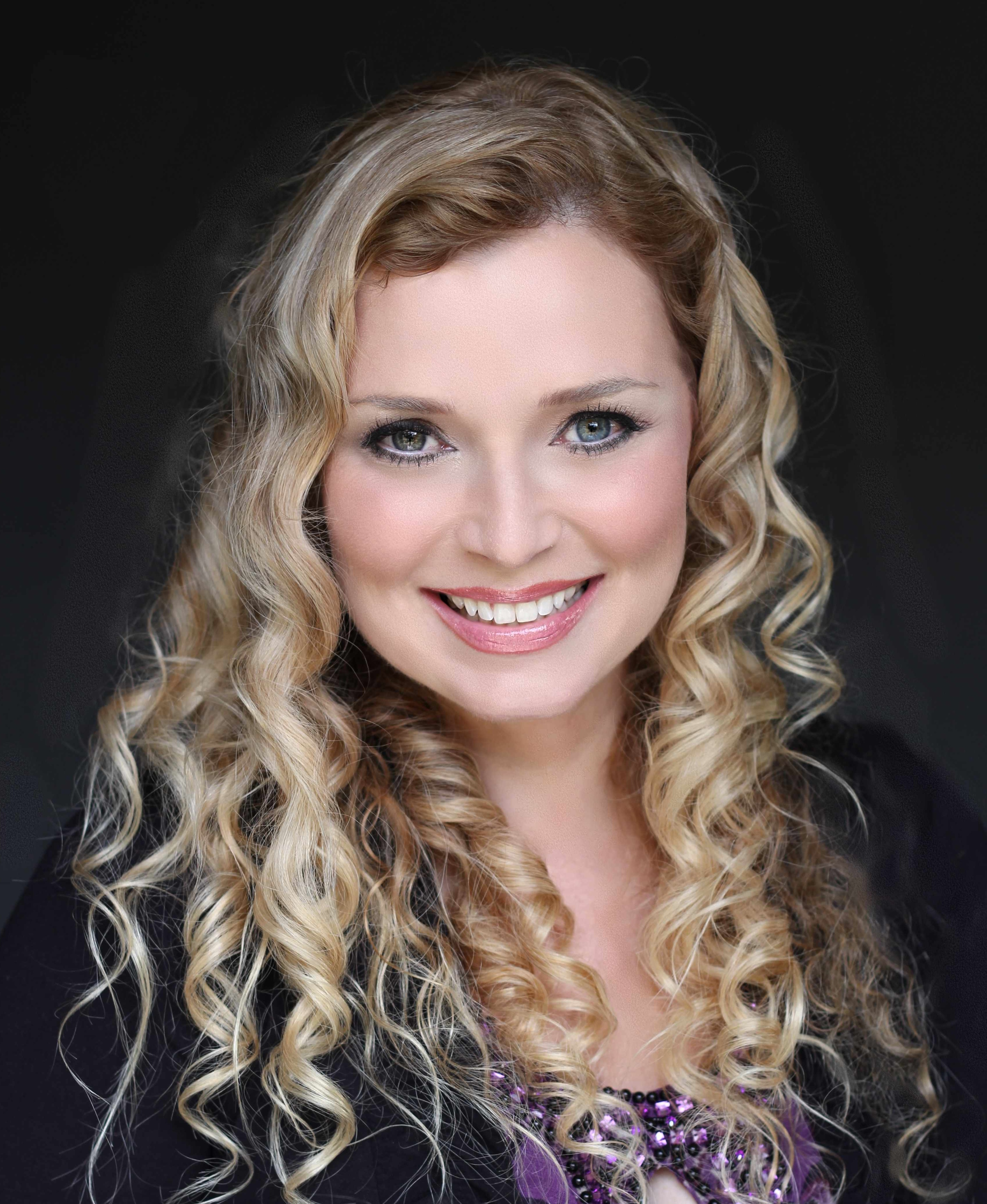
- Moore in 2012
- Born: January 16, 1969 (age 57)
- Education: University of Southern California
- Occupations: Genetic genealogist, media consultant
- Years active: 2010–present
- Known for: Working on high profile human identification cases

CeCe Moore (born January 16, 1969) is an American genetic genealogist best known for being the genetic genealogy expert for Finding Your Roots and being the head of Parabon NanoLabs's genetic genealogical unit. She has appeared on American TV shows such as 20/20, Dateline NBC, 48 Hours, The Doctors, The Dr. Oz Show, CBS This Morning, The Today Show, Good Morning America, NBC Nightly News, and CBS 60 Minutes. She has reportedly helped law enforcement agencies in identifying suspects in over 300 cold cases using DNA and genetic genealogy. In May 2020, Moore began appearing in a prime-time ABC television series The Genetic Detective; each episode recounts a cold case she helped solve. In addition to television work, she is known for pioneering the genetic genealogy methodologies used by adoptees and others of unknown origin for identifying biological family.

== Background ==
Moore was born in 1969 to Anthony Michael Moore (1935–2008) and Janis Proctor. She studied theatre, film, and vocal performance at the University of Southern California and appeared in commercials and professional musical theatre shows, and, later, directed and cast advertising campaigns.

Moore became interested in DNA genealogy in about 2003. In 2009 while she was developing an advertisement for the company Family Tree DNA, she met genealogist Katherine Borges who was director of International Society of Genetic Genealogy (ISOGG). Borges introduced Moore to rival consumer DNA company 23andMe and made Moore a leader of a forum for people who wanted to know more about DNA genealogy. Moore became fascinated by the subject, taught herself about it, passed her business projects over to her husband Lennart Martinson and worked full-time on DNA genealogy. In 2012 she approached 23andMe to ask if she could put crime-scene DNA into their DNA databases. 23andMe refused, but later in 2018 she began to use the DNA databases of GEDmatch and Family Tree DNA.

She has appeared on TV shows such as Finding Your Roots, 20/20, Dateline NBC, 48 Hours, The Doctors, The Dr. Oz Show, CBS This Morning, The Today Show, Good Morning America, NBC Nightly News, and CBS 60 Minutes. She has been the genetic genealogy expert for Finding Your Roots since 2012 and heads the Parabon NanoLabs genetic genealogical unit.

In 2024, she was presented with the Daughters of the American Revolution Medal of Honor by DAR President General Pamela Rouse Wright.

== Human identification cases ==
Moore has been a key player in a number of human identification cases. In 2012-2014, she was the genetic genealogist who worked with the Branum family on the Thomas Ray Lippert University of Utah artificial insemination sperm swap case. Paul Fronczak was a newborn who was kidnapped from his mother's arms by a woman posing as a nurse in a Chicago hospital in 1964 and believed to have been returned to his natural parents in 1966. In 2015, Moore's team of genetic genealogists uncovered the true identity of the man raised as Paul Fronczak. Using the methods Moore developed for birth parent search in adoption, it was discovered that his real name is Jack Rosenthal and that he has a missing twin named Jill. The real Paul Fronczak was found living in Michigan in 2019.

In 2015, Moore led a team of researchers that established the true identity of amnesiac Benjaman Kyle as William Burgess Powell. In 2004, Kyle had been found outside a Burger King in Georgia; doctors determined he suffered from dissociative amnesia. For 11 years neither Kyle nor law enforcement assisting in his case knew his true identity. Moore works extensively with adults who were abandoned as babies to identify their biological identities. The birth parents of California foundling Kayla Tovo were identified through Moore's work, as were the birth parents of the Los Angeles-area three half-sibling foundlings who were featured on 20/20 in May 2016, and the birth parents of the Tulsa Fairgrounds foundling "May Belle" aka Amy Cox, as featured on The Dr. Oz Show in October 2016.

As the genetic genealogist for the PBS series Finding Your Roots with Henry Louis Gates, Jr., in 2015 Moore made the discovery that LL Cool J's mother was adopted. Through analysis of his DNA, she was able to identify his biological grandparents and introduce him to his 90-year old biological maternal grandmother.

== Projects ==
=== Family research ===
In February 2015, Moore founded a Facebook group called DNA Detectives that guides adoptees and others of unknown parentage to DNA to identify birth family. In 2024, this Facebook page had 208,000 followers and is the largest online genetic genealogy group.

=== Criminal investigations ===
In 2018, Moore joined Parabon NanoLabs as head of their genetic genealogy unit and hired three female genetic genealogists to work with her. Parabon investigates cold cases using genetic genealogy. In February 2019, she was optimistic that most cold cases could be solved using public DNA data in a few years. However, in May 2019, GEDmatch, the DNA database that she had mostly used to solve cold cases, changed its privacy rules so that it became much more difficult to solve cold cases. Moore said "Whatever one thinks about this decision, it is inarguable that it is a setback for justice and victims and their families." By January 2024, Moore's team reportedly had solved more than 300 cases.

==== Case results ====
===== 2018 =====
- Moore's first case led to the arrest in 2018 of William Earl Talbott II for the murder of Tanya Van Cuylenborg in Snohomish County, Washington in 1987. He pled not guilty; but in June 2019, he was convicted of two counts of aggravated first-degree murder and sentenced to two life sentences. In December 2021, Talbott's conviction was overturned by an Appeals Court because one of the jurors was biased. The genetic genealogy was not questioned. His conviction was later upheld.
- In 2018, she helped the police arrest Raymond Rowe for the 1992 sexual assault and murder of 25-year-old schoolteacher Christy Mirack in East Lampeter Township, Pennsylvania. Rowe confessed and was sentenced to life without parole.
- Moore also led the police to arrest Gary Hartman, a suspect for the 1986 rape and murder of a 12-year-old Michella Welch in Tacoma, Washington. In 2019, Washington state passed "Jennifer and Michella's law" named after Welch and Jennifer Bastian, a 13-year-old girl also murdered in 1986. This law allowed police more latitude in taking DNA samples from convicted sex offenders. Hartman was convicted and sentenced to 26 years in prison in March 2022.
- She also identified the murderer in a 1981 stabbing and strangulation of 40-year-old realtor Virginia Freeman in Brazos County, Texas as James Otto Earhart who had been executed in 1999 for the murder of nine-year-old Kandy Kirtland in 1987. Earhart's body was exhumed, and a DNA match made between evidence at the crime scene and between him and his son. Earhart was also suspected of having murdered 51-year-old Ruth Richardson Green in 1986.
- In 2018, Moore helped police identify John D. Miller, the murderer of April Marie Tinsley, an eight-year-old girl who was raped and strangled in 1988 near Fort Wayne, Indiana. Miller confessed to the crime after he was arrested and was sentenced to 80 years in jail.
- In 2018, Matthew Dusseault and Tyler Grenon were arrested as suspects in the 2016 murder by stabbing of Constance Gauthier, an 81-year-old woman in Woonsocket, Rhode Island in a case Moore and Parabon assisted in. The charges against Grenon were later dismissed.
- In 2018, Moore and Parabon helped police identify Spencer Glen Monnett, who was arrested and charged with the rape, burglary and assault of a 79-year-old woman in St. George, Utah in 2018. Monnett pled guilty and was sentenced to a minimum of six years in jail, although the Board of Pardons could require he serve his entire life as the maximum sentence.
- She also helped the police with the 2018 arrest of Darold Wayne Bowden in connection with the six rapes in Fayetteville, North Carolina from 2006 to 2008 (called the Ramsey Street Rapist). Bowden was also a suspect in two other rape cases from 1998 to 2012. Bowden Pled guilty in February 2022 and was sentenced to 22 years in prison.
- Moore helped with the arrest of Michael Henslick in 2018 for the murder of 22-year-old Holly Cassano in 2009 in Champaign, Illinois. Henslick was convicted and sentenced to life without parole.
- She also assisted with the identification of Marlon Michael Alexander for a series of rapes that took place from 2007 to 2011 in Montgomery County, Maryland. Alexander confessed and was sentenced to life in jail.
- Moore helped with the arrest and conviction of Luke Fleming for the 1999 rape and murder of 47-year-old Deborah Dalzell in Sarasota, Florida. Fleming was given two life sentences.
- Moore identified Robert Eugene Brashers (who committed suicide in 1999) as the man who raped and murdered Genevieve Zitricki, then 28, in Greenville, South Carolina in 1990 and murdered Megan Scherer, 12, and her mother, Sherri Scherer, 38, in Portageville, Missouri in 1998.
- Moore helped police with the arrest in October 2018 of Michael Wayne Devaughn for the 1990 "Labor Day Murder" of 65-year-old Betty Jones, and the rape of 81-year-old Kathryn Crigler in Starkville, Mississippi. In November 2020, Devaughn pled guilty and was sentenced to life without parole.
- In October 2018, Winston Corbett was arrested for the murder of Professor James Miller and attempted murder of Linda Miller in October 2011 in Elkhart, Indiana. Moore's team at Parabon helped police identify Corbett with genetic genealogy. Corbett was convicted in November 2020 and was sentenced to 115 years in prison.
- In November 2018, she helped the Fulton County, Georgia police with the arrest of Jerry Lee in Alabama for the 1997 murder of 28-year-old Lorrie Ann Smith.
- Moore helped the Orlando, Florida police with the arrest of Benjamin Holmes for the 2001 armed robbery and murder of 25-year-old college student Christine Franke. Eleanor Holmes, the suspect's mother, complained that police had obtained her DNA by deceit.
- In December 2018, Moore's genetic genealogy unit was instrumental in the arrest and conviction of Jerry Lynn Burns for the murder by stabbing 39 years earlier of 18-year-old Michelle Martinko in Cedar Rapids, Iowa. Burns was sentenced to life without parole.

===== 2019 =====
- In January 2019, Moore's group at Parabon identified William Louis Nichols as the violent rapist of a 12-year-old girl in Hernando County, Florida in 1983 using genetic genealogy. Nichols died in 1998.
- Shane Boice was arrested for raping a 33-year-old woman in 2012 in Belle Fourche, South Dakota. Moore's team at Parabon had helped identify Boice. In September 2020, Boice pleaded guilty to the charges and was sentenced to 45 years in prison.
- Moore's genetic genealogy group at Parabon also helped with the arrests in January 2019 of Russell Anthony Guerrero for the murder of 30-year-old Jack Upton, 28 years earlier in Fremont, California.
- She helped with the arrest of Zachary Bunney for the murder by stabbing by machete of Scott Martinez in 2006 in La Mesa, California. Bunney was convicted and sentenced to 12 years in jail.
- In January 2019, Moore's group identified Jerry Walter McFadden as the murderer and rapist of 20-year-old Anna Marie Hlavka in Portland, Oregon in 1979. However, McFadden had already been executed for murder and rape in Texas in 1999.
- In February 2019, Moore's team helped the Alaska police with the arrest of Stephen H. Downs in Maine for the murder of 20-year-old University of Alaska student Sophie Sergie in Fairbanks, Alaska in 1993. Downs was convicted in February 2022 and was sentenced in September to 75 years in prison.
- In February 2019, Moore's team helped Virginia police with the arrest of Jesse Bjerke for the rape of a 24-year-old female lifeguard at gunpoint in Alexandria, Virginia in 2016. Bjerke confessed to the rape and was sentenced to 65 years in jail.
- She helped California police with the arrest of James Alan Neal for the 1973 abduction and murder by strangulation of 11-year-old schoolgirl Linda O'Keefe in Newport Beach, California. Neal died in police custody in July 2020 before he went to trial.
- Moore's team led California police to identify Joseph Holt as the perpetrator of the sexual aggression and murder of both 27-year-old Brynn Rainey in 1977 and 16-year-old Carol Andersen 1979 near South Lake Tahoe, California. However, Holt had already died in 2014.
- Her team helped with the arrest in March 2019 of Thomas Lewis Garner as a suspect in the 1984 beating and death by strangulation in Sanford, Florida of 25-year-old Pamela Cahanes who had just graduated from US Naval basic training. Garner was convicted of the murder in May 2021 and was sentenced to life without parole. Garner is now being charged with the 1982 Hawaii murder of Kathy Hicks.
- In March 2019, her team helped police with the arrest of Raymond L. Vannieuwenhoven charged with the murder of 25-year-old David Schuldes and the sexual aggression and murder of Schuldes' fiancée 24-year-old Ellen Matheys in 1976 in Silver Cliff, Wisconsin. In August 2021 he was sentenced to two life sentences.
- She helped identify Kenneth Earl Day as the person who raped a 53-year-old woman in 1989 and raped and murdered 44-year-old Le Bich-Thuy in 1994 in Rockville, West Virginia. However, Day had already died in 2017 at the age of 52.
- In March 2019, Moore's team at Parabon helped Alabama Police with the arrest of a truck driver with no criminal record, Coley McCraney, who was charged with the murder of two teenage girls, Tracie Hawlett and J.B. Beasley, in Ozark, Alabama in 1999.
- Her team helped Montana police identify Cecil Stan Caldwell as the prime suspect in the rape and murder of 24-year-old Linda Bernhardt and the murder of her husband 24-year-old Clifford Bernhardt in Billings, Montana in 1973. However, Caldwell (a co-worker of Linda Bernhardt) had already died in 2003.
- In March 2019, Moore's team identified a body which had been found beside the James River in 2016 as Hassan A. Alkebu-Lan of Richmond, Virginia using genetic genealogy. Police did not suspect this was a crime scene.
- In May 2019, Moore's team at Parabon assisted police with the arrest of Richard E. Knapp charged with the rape and murder of 26-year-old Audrey Frasier in 1994 in Vancouver, Washington.
- Her team helped identify Jeffrey Hand as the killer of 19-year-old Indiana State University student Pam Milam who was raped and strangled in Terre Haute, Indiana in 1972. However, Hand had already died in 1978.
- Brian Leigh Dripps confessed to the sexual assault and murder by stabbing of 18-year-old Angie Dodge in 1996 after Idaho Falls, Idaho Police charged him in May 2019. Moore had helped police investigate this case in which other men had previously been targeted by the police. One man, Christopher Tapp, had been sentenced to 20 years in prison for the crime. Tapp was exonerated. Moore said "...to exonerate Christopher Tapp is the thing I am most proud of."
- Johnnie B. Green Jr., was arrested and accused of nine rapes during the period from June 2009 to December 2010. Police in Fayetteville, North Carolina, credited Moore's Parabon team for its genetic genealogy assistance.
- Frank Edward Wypych was identified as being responsible for the murder and sexual assault of Susan Galvin in 1967 in Seattle, Washington. However, Wypych died in 1987. His body was exhumed and his DNA extracted to verify the identification, which was announced on May 7, 2019. This was the oldest cold-case (52 years) to be solved by Moore's team using genetic genealogy to-date.
- Roger Hearne Kelso was identified in June 2019 as the homicide victim found inside a trash can during building excavation in 1985 in Anne Arundel County, Maryland using Parabon's genetic genealogy unit. Kelso was last seen in 1962. The perpetrator was not identified.
- In July 2019, Moore's team from DNA Detectives helped Riverside, California police identify a non-verbal man who had been found unconscious at Christmas 2018.
- The Steuben County Indiana police announced in July 2019 that, with the help of Parabon Nanolabs, they had identified the body of a woman found near Angola, Indiana in 1999. The woman was named as Tina L. Cabanaw, from Detroit. The cause of death was described as highly suspicious and undetermined.
- In August 2019, Ivan Keith was arrested in Seal Cove, Maine and charged with five counts of aggravated rape in the 1990s in Massachusetts. Keith had a history of sexual offences. Parabon had assisted police by used genetic genealogy to identify Keith as a suspect. In November 2020, Keith pled guilty to one count of rape and was sentenced to 19 to 20 years in prison and in February 2021, Keith pled guilty to the remaining charges against him and was sentenced to 25 to 30 years in prison.
- Donald McQuade was arrested in September 2019 in Gresham, Oregon and charged with first and second-degree murder of 16-year-old Shelley Connolly in 1978 in Anchorage, Alaska. Connolly had been beaten, raped, dragged from a moving car and thrown over an embankment. She had tried to crawl out of the embankment but had died in the cold of the Alaskan winter. Moore's team at Parabon had helped local police using genetic genealogy and DNA from under Connolly's nails and on her body.
- 11-year-old Terri Lynn Hollis was sexually assaulted and murdered by strangulation in 1972 in Torrance, California. In 2019, Moore and her team at Parabon helped police identify Jake Edward Brown as the possible killer. Brown had died in Arizona in 2003 but police exhumed his body and confirmed that his DNA was a match from the murder scene. Brown had been arrested for rapes in 1973 and 1974 and had served time in jail after Hollis' murder.
- In September 2019, Moore's team helped Florida police with the arrest of Robert Hayes who was charged with the murder of 35-year-old Rachel Bay in March 2006 in Palm Beach County, Florida; DNA from Bay's murder scene matched DNA from a cigarette that Hayes had discarded. Hayes was also charged in November 2019 with the murders of Laquetta Gunther, Julie Green and Iwana Patton in a December 2005 - February 2006 time period in Daytona Beach.
- Jeffrey King was indicted by a grand jury in September 2019 for the rape of a 22-year-old woman at the University of Delaware (Newark, Delaware) in 1993. In October 2019, King turned himself in to the police. Moore and Parabon had used genetic genealogy to assist the police in this case.
- In September 2019, Moore and Parabon helped Colorado police identify Donald Steven Perea as the murderer of 18-year-old hitchhiker Jeannie Marie Moore in 1981 in Genesee Park, Jefferson County, Colorado. Perea had already died in 2012 and had served time in prison for rape from 1982 to 1985.
- In October 2019, Moore and Parabon helped police identify the remains of the body of a murdered teenage girl nicknamed "The Fly Creek Girl" found in 1980 near Amboy, Washington. The girl, Sandra Morden, was born in 1962 and police believed she was murdered in 1977 or 1978.
- 19-year-old Mason Alexander Hall was charged in October 2019 with the violent rape at gunpoint of a 19-year-old woman in Norristown Farm Park, Pennsylvania in 2017. Hall was already in custody in 2019 for vandalizing a car and the DNA from his blood from this crime scene was a match for the DNA from the 2017 rape case. Parabon's genetic genealogy had pointed police to local suspects for this case, one of which was Hall. Hall was held on $1 million bail. Hall pled guilty in June 2021 and was sentenced to 13 to 32 years in prison.
- In November 2019, Moore and her team at Parabon were instrumental in helping police arrest Giles Daniel Warrick who was charged with murder and ten rapes in Montgomery County, Maryland and Washington D.C. in the 1990s. (See the Potomac River Rapist.)
- Salisbury, North Carolina police announced in December 2019 that, with the help of Parabon, they believed they had identified Curtis Edward Blair as the killer of 15-year-old Reesa Dawn Trexler. She was found nude in her bedroom with several stab wounds in her neck and upper chest in 1984. Blair had already died in 2004 but his body was exhumed for DNA examination and police considered the case closed.
- Moore and Parabon helped Oak Ridge North, Texas police with the murder of Subir Chatterjee in 2002. Based on genetic genealogy and detective work, police arrested Martin Isaac Tellez in December 2019 and charged him with capital murder in Chatterjee's death.
- In December 2019, Fort Worth, Texas police announced they believed they had identified James Francis McNichols as the murderer of 11-year-old Julie Fuller in 1983 with the help of Moore's team. However, McNichols had already died in 2004.
- In December 2019, Moore, Parabon and United Data Connect helped Douglas County, Colorado police with the arrest of James Curtis Clanton for the rape and murder of 21-year-old Helene Pruszynski. Pruszynski, a radio station intern and a Massachusetts college student, was found dead in a field in 1980, naked, with her hands tied behind her back and with nine stab wounds. In February 2020, Clanton pled guilty and in July 2020, Clanton was sentenced to life in prison with 20 years before parole.
- Moore and Parabon helped Fremont California police in December 2019 identify Clifton Hudspeth as the killer of 16-year-old cousins Jeffrey Flores Atup and Mary Jane Malatag in 1982. However, Hudspeth had already died in 1999. His body was exhumed and was a match for DNA from the crime scene.
- With the help of Moore's genetic genealogy team, Florida police arrested Joseph Mills in December 2019 and charged him with the rape and murder by strangulation of Linda Patterson Slaten in Lakeland, Florida in 1981. Mills was Slaten's son's football coach.
- In December 2019, Moore and Parabon helped Parker County, Texas police identify the remains of a young man murdered in 1984 and found in a shallow grave beside the road as 22-year-old William "Billy" Fiegener. Police later identified Forrest Ethington, who had already died of a heart attack, as the suspected killer.

===== 2020 =====
- In January 2020, DuPage County, Illinois Police announced they had identified the rapist/killer of 16-year-old Pamela Maurer in 1976 with the help of Parabon's genetic genealogy team. The killer was Bruce Lindahl who had died in 1981 and was suspected of being a serial killer. Lindahl's body was exhumed to confirm a DNA match.
- In February 2020, Parabon's genetic genealogy team helped Montgomery County, Maryland police to identify Hans Alejandro Huitz as a suspect in the killing of James Kweku Essel in 1992. However, when police approached Huitz to arrest him, Huitz pulled a gun and was shot dead by the police.
- In February 2020, Dekalb County, Illinois police announced they had arrested Jonathan Hurst and charged him with the murder of Patricia Wilson, 85, and her son Robert Wilson, 64, in Sycamore, Illinois in 2016. Moore and her team at Parabon had helped police with the case.
- Vallejo, California police said in February 2020, with the help of Parabon's genetic genealogy unit, they had identified the likely killer of 57 year old Naomi Sanders who was raped and strangled in 1973. However, the suspect, Robert Dale Edwards (whose father had worked with Sanders), had already died from a drug overdose in 1993.
- In March 2020, it was reported that Parabon had helped Phoenix, Arizona police identify the body of young woman found in 1983 (Pinal County Jane Doe 1983) as Peggy Elgo, a member of the San Carlos Apache tribe.
- Pensacola, Florida police arrested Daniel Leonard Wells in March 2020 and charged him with the sexual assault and murder by strangulation of 23-year-old Tonya Ethridge McKinley in 1985. Moore's team had helped the police using genetic genealogy. The police said DNA from Wells's discarded cigarette matched semen from the crime scene. Wells committed suicide in April 2020 by hanging himself in his cell before a scheduled court appearance.
- The murderer and rapist of 12-year-old Marsi Belecz in Spokane, Washington in 1985 was identified as Clayton Carl Giese with the help of Moore's team at Parabon. Giese had died in a car accident but police exhumed his body which was a DNA match with semen from the dead girl's body.
- In April 2020, Moore's team helped Delaware County, Ohio police find Daniel Alan Anderson as the suspected killer of 15-year-old John Muncy whose body was found dismembered by the side of a road in 1983. However, Anderson had already died in 2013.
- Santa Fe, New Mexico police arrested Joseph Matthew Gregory Jones in May 2020 and charged him with the murder by shooting of Robert J. Romero in July 2018. Moore's team at Parabon had helped local police narrow down the list of suspects.
- In June 2020, it was announced that Moore's team at Parabon helped police identify the murderer of 47-year-old realtor Carolyn Cox Rose in 1978 in Escambia County, Florida. However the perpetrator, Julius William Hill Jr., had already died in prison in 2007 while serving a 30-year sentence for two bank robberies.
- Tulsa, Oklahoma police arrested Leroy Jamal Smith in June 2020 and charged him with five rapes between 1993 and 1995 of women aged 19–40 years old. Moore's team at Parabon had helped police with the case. The charges against Smith were dropped after a judge ruled that Smith cannot be prosecuted in Muskogee County Court as a U.S. Supreme Court ruling said Smith couldn't be charged in state court due to tribal jurisdiction and that he also couldn't be charged in federal court because the statute of limitations had expired for rape.
- Moore's team at Parabon helped Chisholm, Minnesota police and the Minnesota Bureau of Criminal Apprehension with the arrest in July 2020 of Michael Allan Carbo Jr for the murder of 38-year-old Nancy Daugherty of Chisholm, Minnesota. Daugherty was sexually assaulted, beaten and murdered at her house in 1986.
- In July 2020, Alan Edward Dean was arrested by Snohomish County, Washington police and charged with the sexual assault and murder of 15-year-old Melissa Lee of Bothell, Washington in 1993. Moore's team at Parabon had helped with the case. The charges against Dean were dismissed twice after he was found incompetent to stand trial. In 2024 he was finally sentenced to 26 years in prison.
- In August 2020, the Alaska Department of Public Safety announced that, with the help of Parabon, they had solved the murder case of 17-year-old Jessica Baggen who was raped and strangled in Sitka, Alaska in 1996. Genetic genealogy pointed to Steve Branch who had been living Sitka in 1996. When approached by Alaskan police and asked for a DNA sample, Branch shot himself dead. Richard Bingham had been arrested and falsely accused of the murder in 1996.
- Steven Ray Hessler was arrested by in August 2020 and charged with multiple cases of sexual assault and burglary between 1982 and 1985 in Shelby County, Indiana. Moore's team at Parabon had helped Indiana police narrow down suspects to Hessler or a relative. Hessler was found guilty of his charges in March 2022 and was sentenced to 650 years in prison.
- In 1986 the remains of a murdered teenage girl were found in a landfill in Chesterfield, Virginia. In August 2020 Moore's team at Parabon helped local police identify her as 16-year-old Christy Lynn Floyd who had lived in Richmond, Virginia.
- The remains of a partial human skull and bone fragments were found near Government Camp, Oregon by US Forest Service workers in 1986. Date of death was estimated to be 1976. In October 2020 the Clackamas County, Oregon, Police announced that, with the help of Moore's team at Parabon, they had identified the skull as belonging to Wanda Ann Herr who was 19 in 1976.
- In November 2020, with the help of Moore, Westminster, California police charged Aryan Vito Smith with the murder by stabbing of 22-year-old Treeanna Nichols in the Westminster Quality Inn in 2018.
- 19-year-old Deborah Tomlinson was found bound, sexually assaulted, and strangled to death in an apartment complex in Grand Junction, Colorado in 1975. With the help of Parabon, police announced in December 2020 that they solved the case, and named the murderer as Jimmie Dean Duncan who had died in 1987.
- Colorado Springs, Colorado police said in December 2020 that they were confident that they had identified Ricky Severt as the murderer of 23-year old Jennifer Watkins in 1999 with the help of Moore. Watkins was found dead, wrapped in plastic, and bound with duct tape in a stairwell in the hospital where she worked. Severt was a maintenance worker in the hospital at the time of the murder but had died in a car accident in 2001.
- James Byrd was arrested in December 2020 and charged with armed kidnapping and sexual battery of a 22-year-old woman in Tampa Bay, Florida in 1998. Parabon had helped with the case. Two other rape cases in 1999 matched Byrd's DNA. Byrd was acquitted of all charges at trial.

===== 2021 =====
- David Lee Blair was arrested by Pasquotank police in January 2021 and charged with the murder of 74-year-old George Washington Price Jr. in Winston-Salem, North Carolina in 2016. Price had died from multiple stab wounds. Moore's team at Parabon had helped with this case.
- In Fort Myers, Florida, in 1984, 31-year-old Claretha Gibbs died from gunshot wounds to the abdomen. From DNA found at the scene, Moore's team were able to identify James Glen Drinnon of Okeechobee, Florida as a likely suspect. Police interrogated Drinnon on January 13, 2021, when he confessed to the murder. On January 18, 2021, Drinnon died at his home.
- Robert Plympton was charged in June 2021 with the rape and murder of 19-year-old Barbara Mae Tucker in Gresham, Oregon in 1980. Tucker had been walking towards the Gresham Mount Hood Community College when she was raped and beaten to death. Moore and her team had helped Gresham police with this case.
- In July 2021, Lionel Wells was arrested for sexually assaulting five teenage girls between 2007 and 2014 in Detroit. In September 2022, after pleading guilty, Wells was sentenced to 25 to 50 years in prison.
- In August 2021, Bruce A. Cymanski was arrested and charged with the kidnapping, sexual assault and murder of 17-year old Nancy Noga, a senior in high school in Sayreville, New Jersey in 1999. CeCe Moore and her team had been instrumental in helping local police identify Cymanski.
- In August 2021, Moore helped Newport Beach, California police identify Kenneth Elwin Marks as the likely murderer of 42-year-old Judith Nesbitt in 1980. Nesbitt had been showing her family's boat to a likely buyer. After a violent struggle she was robbed and shot. DNA had been extracted from the roots of hair found at the scene, a procedure thought to have been impossible before this case. Marks had died in 1999 and police considered this case to be solved.
- In November 2021, Shawna Browning and her girlfriend Lauren Harrison were arrested in Detroit, Michigan and charged with Aggravated murder for the death of Shawna's 9-year-old daughter Haley Mae Coblentz who was found dead in Oregon on December 10, 2020. However the charges were dropped on March 11, 2022, pending further investigation.
- In December 2021, David Edward Doran was identified as the Myers Park Rapist who was responsible for committing at least 15 sexual assaults of young girls in North Carolina between 1990 and 1999. Doran could not be charged as he died in 2008 from throat cancer. The case marked the 200th time that a lead from the Snapshot DNA analysis division at Parabon NanoLabs resulted in a positive identification since Parabon began offering forensic genetic genealogy services to law enforcement.

===== 2022 =====
- In April, William Clark was arrested for the 1987 sexual assault of a 14-year-old girl.
- In May, Jennifer Lynn Matter, of Belvidere Township, Michigan was arrested and charged with second-degree murder with intent, not premeditated, and second-degree murder without intent for the murders of her newborn daughter who was found dead in the Mississippi River in 1999 and her newborn son who was found dead in Lake Pepin in 2003.
- In May, Alan Lefferts was arrested for the 1996 murder of James Branner in Tallahassee, Florida.
- In July, the 1975 stabbing murder of Lindy Sue Biechler of Manor Township, Pennsylvania was linked to David Sinopoli using genealogical evidence that tracked back to Gasperina in Italy coupled with immigration records and the unusually thorough and complete records of a Lancaster County club that recorded Italian members' towns of origin. Police used a discarded coffee cup to link Sinopoli to crime-scene DNA leading to his arrest.

== See also ==
- Colleen M. Fitzpatrick
