= Brice Foods =

American food company

Brice Foods was a company based out of Dallas, Texas, and was the parent of the frozen yogurt franchise I Can't Believe It's Yogurt. Brice Foods was sold in 1996 to Yogen Früz of Toronto, Canada, and the founders were no longer involved in the company.

== I Can't Believe It's Yogurt ==
I Can't Believe It's Yogurt was founded in 1977 by Bill and Julie Brice from Dallas, Texas. In 1981, I Can't Believe It's Yogurt sued TCBY, whose company name was originally "This Can't Be Yogurt!". The lawsuit filed by I Can't Believe It's Yogurt forced its competitor to change its name from "This Can't Be Yogurt!" to the backronym for its initials, "The Country's Best Yogurt."

== Fraud case ==
In 1999, several Brice Foods executives were sued for investment fraud and conspiracy by investors in international franchise operations. The allegations related to Brice Foods' misappropriation of investor funds and defaulting on promissory notes back to 1992, and the flow of money to top company executives of Brice Foods. A state court trial in San Antonio, Texas found the executives not liable on all counts.

== See also ==
- List of food companies
