= S. R. Butler High School =

Location
- 3401 Holmes Avenue; Huntsville, Alabama; United States
- 34°43′35.03″N 86°37′3.85″W

Information
- Type: Public
- Motto: CHOICES Matter
- Established: 1951
- Closed: 2015
- School district: Huntsville City Schools
- Principal: Lisa Hachar
- Faculty: 61.0 (on FTE basis)
- Grades: 9 to 12
- Enrollment: 896 (2005–06)
- Student to teacher ratio: 14.7
- Colors: Green and gold
- Mascot: Rebel

S. R. Butler High School was a four-year public high school that served students in grades 9-12 from Huntsville, Alabama. The school was named after Samuel Riley Butler, a principal, school superintendent, and school founder. It opened in 1951 and closed in 2015.

== History ==
Samuel Riley Butler (November 2, 1868 - ?) was a principal, superintendent of public schools, and school owner in Alabama. He was born in Poplar Ridge in Madison County and grew up in Tennessee. He was a Democrat. He married Ida Lee Smith. Canada Butler was one of his grandfathers.

He started Butler Training School in 1908 and operated it until 1914. From 1914 until 1929 this building served as the Wills-Taylor School for boys and girls. The city then bought it and made it the Huntsville Junior High School. Now it is a parking lot for the Annie Merts Center for school administration. The first Butler High School was built in 1954 and was originally intended to also serve as a fallout shelter for the surrounding area in the case of a nuclear attack. Its proximity to Redstone Arsenal Army Base made the area a likely target during the Cold War.

The final S.R. Butler High School was built in the late 1960s with the first graduating class in 1968. The previous Butler was renamed Stone Junior High School (years later renamed Stone Middle School) and is located at the intersection of Clinton Avenue and Governors Drive, and was remodeled after a suspicious fire destroyed much of the old school. The final Butler H.S. was located on Holmes Ave.

In 2015, Butler High School was closed due to a dwindling enrollment and poor ratings. Students were re-directed to Columbia, Grissom, Huntsville, Johnson and Lee High Schools. The Rock Family Worship Center currently occupies the old Butler High School building.

Butler Rebel

== Academics ==
Butler made dramatic academic improvements during the 2013–2014 school year having had the highest student growth in reading of any Huntsville City Schools High School. Its students also outperformed several other high schools on the ACT Quality Core End of Course Exams. Butler had an increase in its graduation rate over the last three years: 2011-12- 31% 2012-13- 45% 2013-14-49%. During the 2013–14 school year Butler High School's former principal Elizabeth Hachar was replaced by principal Sanchella Graham. Despite noted improvements in the quality of educated provided for students at S. R. Butler High School the school remained on the failing schools list for the state of Alabama.

== Clubs and activities ==
- Academic Team
- AFJROTC
- Art Club
- Band
- Dance Team
- Drama Club
- Key Club
- National Honor Society
- Peer Helpers
- Science Club
- Spanish Club
- Student Government Association
- Theatre
- Yearbook

== Athletics ==
- Baseball
- Basketball, Varsity, JV & Freshman
- Basketball, Girls
- Cheerleading
- Football
- Golf
- Soccer
- Softball
- Track
- Volleyball
- Wrestling

Butler's basketball team, coached by Jack Doss, won the 2011 4A State Championship on Friday, March 4, defeating Anniston High School 44–39 at the Birmingham–Jefferson Convention Complex (BJCC). Butler won six State Championships in boys basketball, the most of all Huntsville City Schools. These championships occurred in 1966 under coach Cotton Rogers and in 2004, 2005, 2008, 2009 and 2011 under Jack Doss.

== Notable alumni ==
- Clay Bennett (class of 1976), 2002 Pulitzer Prize winner for editorial cartooning
- Robert Eugene Brashers, serial killer and perpetrator of the 1991 Austin yogurt shop murders
- Tom Butler, former member of the Alabama Legislature. Served Senate District 2 from 1995 to 2010.
- Sheryll D. Cashin (class of 1980), law professor at Georgetown University Law Center
- Kenneth Darby, running back for several teams in the NFL
- Shawn Draper, former NFL player, drafted to the Miami Dolphins
- Donald Heflin (class of 1976), American diplomat and the U.S. Ambassador to Cape Verde from 2015 to 2018
- John Hendricks (class of 1970), founder and CEO of Discovery Channel
- Bobby Lee Hurt (class of 1981), former professional basketball player
- Jimmy Key (class of 1979), former Major League Baseball pitcher
- Trevor Lacey (class of 2011), basketball player
- Pam Long, American actress and writer. She appeared on an NBC daytime program and turned to writing after her acting career. She won two daytime Emmy Awards for best writing on the Guiding Light TV series.
- Bo Matthews (class of 1970), NFL running back for San Diego Chargers
- Don Mincher, former Major League Baseball first baseman and President of baseball's Southern League
- Ramzee Robinson, NFL cornerback, Mr. Irrelevant of 2007 NFL draft
- Adam Schreiber (class of 1980), former NFL center and offensive guard from 1984 through 1998
