= Murder of Angie Dodge =

1996 murder in Idaho, U.S.

- Date: June 13, 1996
- Location: Idaho Falls, Idaho, U.S.
- Type: Sexual assault, stabbing homicide
- Motive: Unknown (perpetrator was intoxicated during the incident)
- Perpetrator: Brian Leigh Dripps Sr.
- Deaths: Angie Raye Dodge (born December 21, 1977)
- Accused: Christopher Tapp (initially convicted)
- Charges: Rape and first-degree murder
- Verdict: Plea agreement (Dripps)
- Sentence: Life in prison with eligibility for parole after 20 years

The rape and murder of Angie Dodge occurred in Idaho Falls, Idaho, on June 13, 1996. The true perpetrator was apprehended in May 2019, nearly 23 years after the crime was committed.

Chris Tapp served 20 years in prison after being convicted of Dodge's rape and murder, based upon faulty evidence and a coerced confession. At the same time, authorities continued to search for other suspects whose DNA would match that which was left at the crime scene. In 2017, Tapp's rape conviction was vacated, and he was released from prison.

In 2014, Michael Usry Jr. was accused of rape and murder after he was identified as a suspect through Y-chromosome familial searching, a process by which partial DNA matches to relatives are used to identify an individual. After conducting a proper DNA test, though, authorities discovered that Usry did not match the DNA found at the crime scene, and charges against Usry were dropped.

In 2019, authorities used investigative genetic genealogy to identify Brian Leigh Dripps Sr. He was later found to have a full genetic match to the CODIS profile, and confessed to the crime after interrogation; he was ultimately convicted.

The case helped bring attention to investigative genetic genealogy, a process wherein searching for relatives in consumer genetic databases leads to the discovery of a suspect. With both false accusations and the ultimate conviction obtained through investigative genetic genealogy, the case is an example for how non-criminal genetic repositories are used in criminal investigations, and furthered the debate on the appropriateness of their use.

== Investigation ==
=== Conviction of Chris Tapp ===
In January 1997, about a half year into the investigation, Idaho Falls officials questioned 20-year-old Chris Tapp, initially for information regarding other suspects. After over 100 hours of intense police interrogation, Tapp confessed to the crime under heavy pressure, although no physical evidence tied him to the scene and his confessions were inconsistent and contradictory. Tapp was convicted in May 1998 for aiding and abetting Dodge's rape and murder, and sentenced to a minimum of 30 years in prison.

In 2001, Tapp recanted his confession and claimed he was coerced by police and fed information about the crime. In 2007, after Tapp had served ten years in prison, his case was revisited by the Idaho Innocence Project. A professor and undergraduate at Boise State University who worked with the project reviewed Tapp's interrogation tapes and arrived at the conclusion that Tapp had been heavily coerced into his confession. Tapp's case was appealed in 2017 and the rape charge was rescinded, lessening his sentence from 30 years to 20 years. Tapp had by then served his full 20-year sentence and was released.

In July 2019, Tapp was exonerated for the murder charge, after Brian Leigh Dripps Sr. was arrested as a suspect for Dodge's murder. In October 2020, Tapp sued the city of Idaho Falls for wrongful conviction. In June 2022, a settlement was reached for $11.4 million.

Tapp died after an altercation in a Las Vegas hotel room in October 2023. The Clark County Coroner’s Office ruled his death a homicide. On March 6, 2024, former professional wrestler and congressional candidate Daniel Rodimer was charged with open murder in connection with Tapp's death. Police initially believed that his death was due to a fall. Later reporting led law enforcement to believe that Rodimer struck Tapp after the latter had allegedly offered cocaine to Rodimer's step-daughter. Rodimer surrendered to police the following day.

=== Accusation of Michael Usry Jr. ===
Michael Usry Jr. is a filmmaker from New Orleans, Louisiana, once suspected in the murder of Angie Dodge. Authorities began to suspect Usry through familial searching. His father, Michael Usry Sr., contributed a DNA sample to the Sorenson Molecular Genealogy Foundation. The Sorenson Molecular Genealogy Foundation was later acquired by Ancestry.com, along with the Y-Chromosome database, a collection of genetic data for tracing paternal ancestry. Idaho Falls authorities obtained a court order to search Ancestry.com's Y-Chromosome database, and found a match of 34/35 searched alleles with Usry Sr., a result that strongly indicated a close relative of his (”..would probably be within three or four generations”) would be a close match. Usrey was further suspected because of records of his trips to Idaho that had him going through Idaho Falls.

After Idaho Falls officials interrogated Usry and obtained a saliva sample, they discovered that he did not match the DNA sample found at the scene of Dodge's murder. Allegations against Usry were dropped, and the trail went cold once again. The accusation of Usry brought some negative feedback. Critics claimed that the use of the Ancestry.com database was an unethical breach of privacy. Others argued that since Usry Sr. donated his DNA sample for recreational/religious purposes, that data should not be used as grounds to accuse members of his family of a crime. Ancestry.com met public disapproval from some quarters in allowing law enforcement access to this database. Usry stated that the investigation was a severe breach of his and his father's privacy.

=== Arrest of Brian Leigh Dripps Sr. ===
The investigation once again gained momentum in late 2018, as Idaho Falls authorities made another attempt to use investigative genetic genealogy in order to find Dodge's killer. CeCe Moore, at Parabon NanoLabs in Virginia, agreed to assist authorities in searching GEDMatch, a public repository for autosomal DNA, for near-matches. Results indicated that the murderer had to be a grandson or great grandson of a couple named Clarence and Cleo A. (Landrum) Ussery. Moore identified six known male descendants of the couple as possible suspects. Investigators then identified one of those six as having lived in Idaho in 1996 at the time of Angie Dodge's death. Police tailed the suspect to collect a DNA sample, but it returned negative for a match against the DNA left at the crime 23 years earlier.

After a further three months of genealogical investigation, Moore discovered a seventh previously unknown suspect descended from the same couple, a man named Brian Leigh Dripps Sr. He had lived in Idaho Falls in 1996. In 2019, he was living in Caldwell, Idaho, not far from Idaho Falls. Investigators obtained a DNA sample from a cigarette butt thrown from his car window and found a complete genetic match.

Dripps had been living in Idaho Falls, across the street from the Dodge household, during the period surrounding Dodge's death, and was interviewed by the police as part of a neighborhood canvas five days after the murder. After interrogation, Dripps confessed to the rape and murder of Dodge. Dripps said that he was severely impaired by both drugs and alcohol at the time of the attack. He added that he had intended to rape Dodge, not kill her, and that he had acted alone. In February 2021, Dripps pled guilty to the crime. Dripps, 55 years old at sentencing, was given a life sentence, with a chance of parole after 20 years in prison.

ABC filmed the investigation, discovery, and arrest of Dripps in real time over the course of several years for Moore's documentary series The Genetic Detective, airing in 2020, and later aired much of the footage in a 2021 episode of 20/20. CBS News's 48 Hours also covered the story.

== Investigative Genetic Genealogy crime solving breakthrough ==
Investigative genetic genealogy is the process of finding an individual for which one cannot find a direct DNA match, by finding approximate matches to their relatives, then using genealogical data to isolate the DNA of the individual in question.

Investigators of this case were scrutinized for their use of non-criminal databases to find potential suspects, with the primary concern being a breach of privacy for the individuals involved. In the case of Usry, they located him and his father through the use of one of Ancestry.com's databases (Y-DNA STR data from the former Sorenson Molecular Genealogy Foundation) created as a recreational genealogy project. Usry Sr. had donated his genetic data to the Sorenson project for recreational/religious purposes, without the knowledge that it might one day be used for investigative purposes and potentially to implicate him or his relatives in a crime. Usry stated that this conduct by the authorities was a severe breach of both his and his father's privacy.

The popularity of the technique has grown in recent years. The same method of investigative genetic genealogy that was used to identify Dripps and Usry was used in the discovery and arrest of the Golden State Killer. Consensus among surveyed individuals indicates that the public overall approves of the use of personal genetic data in the investigation of violent offenders.

There remain concerns over genetic data collected for recreational purposes being used to implicate a relative in a crime, without the contributor of that genetic sample consenting to its use in the investigation.

== Impacts ==
While the Dodge case is not the first case to use investigative genetic genealogy, officials involved in the investigation have posited that its success will propel its use in future criminal investigations.
