= Canada Butler =

American politician (1821–1862)

Canada Butler (c. 1821 - December 12, 1862) was a state legislator in Alabama. He lived in Poplar Ridge, Alabama, in Madison County, Alabama. He was a Republican. He died “on duty” and is buried in Montgomery.

He was born about 1821 in Tennessee to Samuel and Margaret (née Layman) Butler.

He served in the Alabama House of Representatives in 1862.

He married Nancy Maples, and they had 7 children, of whom James Edward Butler was their eldest and Samuel Riley Butler their grandson.

He died Friday, December 12, 1862, after being ill for a week.
