= Adam Schreiber =

American football player (born 1962)

No. 75, 65, 76, 60, 67
- Positions: Center, long snapper

Personal information
- Born: February 20, 1962 (age 64); Galveston, Texas, U.S.
- Listed height: 6 ft 4 in (1.93 m)
- Listed weight: 290 lb (132 kg)

Career information
- High school: S. R. Butler (Huntsville, Alabama)
- College: Texas
- NFL draft: 1984: 9th round, 243rd overall pick

Career history
- Seattle Seahawks (1984); New Orleans Saints (1985); Philadelphia Eagles (1986–1988); New York Jets (1988-1989); Minnesota Vikings (1990–1993); New York Giants (1994–1996); Atlanta Falcons (1997–1999)

Career NFL statistics
- Games played: 202
- Games started: 33
- Fumble recoveries: 1
- Stats at Pro Football Reference

Adam Blayne Schreiber (sh-RI-ber; born February 20, 1962) is an American former professional football player who was a center and long snapper in the National Football League (NFL) for 16 seasons with seven different teams. He played college football for the Texas Longhorns.

== Early life ==
Schreiber attended S. R. Butler High School where he was a star on the varsity football team, graduating in 1980.

He then played college football for the Texas Longhorns.

== Professional career ==
Coming out of college in 1984, he was first drafted by the Houston Gamblers as a territorial pick in the USFL draft and then, later in the year, by the Seattle Seahawks in the ninth round of the 1984 NFL draft. He signed with the Seahawks and was cut by them at the end of training camp that year, but then re-signed with them five weeks later. He played in six games for the Seahawks as a guard, but was again cut at the start of training camp in 1985.

He was signed by the New Orleans Saints two months later and played one game for them before again being released at the end of training camp. A few weeks later he was signed as a free agent by the Philadelphia Eagles to replace Jim Gilmore.

In 1987, for the first time in his career, he was the starter all season—missing only the strike games. In the offseason he was signed again by the Eagles and then moved to long snapper. Six games in, he was waived by the Eagles, but then immediately picked up by the New York Jets finishing the season as their long snapper.

In 1989, the Jets moved Schreiber to offensive tackle. At the end of that season he became an unrestricted free agent and was signed by the Minnesota Vikings.

He signed two more times with the Vikings, after the 1991 and 1992 seasons. He played mostly at center, but all five offensive line positions and handled the long-snapping duties. After starting just one game in his first three seasons, he started all 16 in 1993 at center. It the most productive season of his career. Despite his success in 1993, he was cut by the Vikings during the following summer, but picked up by the New York Giants about a month later.

Schreiber played three seasons with Giants, starting four games at center and serving as their long snapper. He was resigned after the 1994 season, but became a free agent after the 1997 one. He was signed in August by the Atlanta Falcons.

Schreiber played three seasons with Falcons as long snapper and center, which included a trip to Super Bowl XXXIII. He was resigned by them after the Super Bowl, but then released three games into the season, ending his career.

== Personal life ==
Schreiber is Jewish. and currently resides in Panama City Beach, Florida.

== See also ==
- List of select Jewish football players
