= Poplar Ridge, Alabama =

- Unincorporated community
- Location within Alabama Location within the United States
- Coordinates: 34°35′14″N 86°21′53″W
- Country: United States
- State: Alabama
- County: Madison
- Elevation: 597 ft (182 m)
- Time zone: UTC-6 (Central (CST))
  - Summer (DST): UTC-5 (CDT)
- Area code: 256
- GNIS feature ID: 156920

Poplar Ridge is an unincorporated community in Madison County, Alabama, United States.

== History ==
Poplar Ridge is named for a nearby ridge that was covered with tulip poplar trees.

A post office operated under the name Poplar Ridge from 1874 to 1908.

In 1874, it was documented as a township in Madison County, Alabama with a population of 611.

Poplar Ridge was an election precinct. In 1880, testimony was given about election activities at the precinct during the investigation of a contested election. In the early 20th century the precinct had a little more than 1,000 residents.

== Education ==
The community was home to Poplar Ridge School. The school is commemorated with a historical marker. Poplar Ridge School opened in 1858. A neo-classical building was constructed in 1875 and held as many as 100 students. It was consolidated with New Hope High School in 1941. The school has also been used as a community center and voting place.

== Notable people ==
- Canada Butler, former member of the Alabama House of Representatives. Grandfather of Samuel Riley Butler, for whom S. R. Butler High School was named for.
- James Edward Butler, son of Canada Butler and former member of the Alabama House of Representatives
