= Thomas Ray Lippert =

Felon and former professor

Thomas Ray Lippert (1950–1999) was a convict and former business law professor at Southwest State College in Marshall, Minnesota. Lippert worked at a fertility clinic named Reproductive Medical Technologies Inc. in Utah from 1988 to the mid 1990s where he reportedly replaced customers' semen with his own. In 1974–1975 he was arrested and later convicted for kidnapping.

== See also ==
- Cecil Jacobson, a fertility doctor who used his own semen to impregnate his patients, without informing them of the source of the semen.
