= Black Dossier =

Black Dossier can refer to:

- Black Dossier (film), a 1955 French film
- The League of Extraordinary Gentlemen: Black Dossier, a graphic novel released November 14, 2007
