= I Can't Believe It's Yogurt! =

American frozen yogurt chain

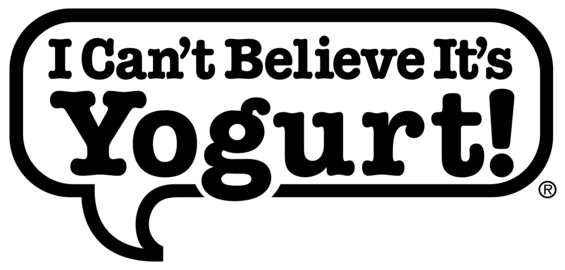
- Type: Franchise
- Industry: Restaurant
- Founded: 1977; 49 years ago in Dallas, Texas
- Headquarters: Markham, Ontario, Canada
- Products: Frozen yogurt
- Parent: Yogen Früz
- Website: www.icbiy.com

I Can't Believe It's Yogurt! is a chain of stores that serves soft-serve frozen yogurt products in the United States. The company has franchised and company-owned stores and non-traditional partnerships for licensing its products.

== History ==
I Can't Believe It's Yogurt! was founded in 1977 by Bill and Julie Brice from Dallas, Texas. Later, it was owned under parent company Brice Foods. In 1984, it sued TCBY, whose company name was originally "This Can't Be Yogurt!". The lawsuit forced TCBY to change its name to "The Country's Best Yogurt!".

I Can't Believe It's Yogurt! was acquired by Yogen Früz in 1996.

=== 1991 Austin murders ===
In 1991, four young girls were raped and murdered in an I Can't Believe It's Yogurt! shop in Austin, Texas. The case went unsolved until 2025 when Austin Police Department collected DNA from a male as a result of one of the rapes, which after testing, was concluded to have originated from serial killer Robert Eugene Brashers.
