= Scott Blackwood =

American writer

- Born: 1965; El Dorado, Arkansas, U.S.
- Died: October 4, 2023 (age 59); Roanoke, Virginia, U.S.
- Education: University of Texas at Austin; Texas State University (MFA)
- Occupations: Novelist; writer
- Writing career
- Genres: Literary fiction and Non-fiction
- Notable awards: Whiting Award (2011), PEN USA Award (2016)
- Website: scottblackwood.com

Scott Blackwood (1965 – October 4, 2023) was an American novelist, short story writer, and nonfiction writer. He is the author of three books of fiction and two volumes of narrative nonfiction about blues, jazz, and the Great Migration that were included in two Cabinets of Wonder released and sold by Third Man Records and Revenant Records. His novel, See How Small, about the brutal murder of three teenage girls in Austin, Texas and the people left behind, won the 2016 PEN USA Award for fiction. His last published book, The Rise and Fall of Paramount Records: A Great Migration Story, 1917-1932, is an historical account that "brings to life the gifted artists and record producers who used Paramount (Records) to revolutionize American music".

He grew up in Texas and attended the University of Texas where he received a BA in psychology before receiving an MFA in creative writing from Texas State University. At the time of his death, he was in the midst of a three-year distinguished professorship teaching creative writing at Hollins University in Roanoke, Virginia. Before that position, he had been the visiting associate professor in the creative writing program at the University of North Texas. He previously taught at Southern Illinois University-Carbondale, Roosevelt University in Chicago, and at the University of Texas at Austin.

== Works ==
Fiction and nonfiction

- In the Shadow of Our House: Stories. Southern Methodist University Press. 2001. ISBN 978-0-87074-464-8.
- We Agreed to Meet Just Here. New Issues Poetry & Prose. 2009. ISBN 978-1-93097-480-7.
- See How Small. Little, Brown and Company. 2015. ISBN 978-0-31637-380-7.
- The Rise and Fall of Paramount Records Vol 1 (1917-1927) Third Man / Revenant
- The Rise and Fall of Paramount Vol 2 (1928-1932) Third Man / Revenant

== Recognition ==
- 2004-2005 Dobie-Paisano Prize and Residency
- 2007 AWP Prize for the Novel for We Agreed to Meet Just Here
- 2010 Texas Institute of Letters Award for Best Work of Fiction We Agreed to Meet Just Here
- 2010 PEN Center USA Award Finalist for Best Work of Fiction We Agreed to Meet Just Here
- 2011 Whiting Award Fiction
- 2015 Nominated for a Grammy Award for Best Album Notes for The Rise and Fall of Paramount Records, Volume One (120 page narrative of Paramount Story)
- 2015 NPR "Great Reads" Best Books of 2015 See How Small
- 2015 New York Times' "Editor's Choice" Selection See How Small
- 2015 Amazon Editors' January "Spotlight" Pick for best new book for January 2015
- 2015 People magazine best new releases of spring 2015
- 2016 National Magazine Award Finalist for Feature Writing, "Here We Are," Chicago magazine, November 2015
- 2016 PEN Center USA Award for Best Work of Fiction See How Small
