= Travis County Corrections Bureau =

Correctional facilities in Travis County, Texas

Travis County Jail
- Interactive map of Travis County Jail
- Location: 500 W 10th St Austin, Texas, U.S.; 30.2732505°N 97.7486219°W
- Status: Operational
- Managed by: Travis County Sheriff's Office

Travis County Correctional Complex
- Interactive map of Travis County Correctional Complex
- Location: 3614 Bill Price Rd. Del Valle, Texas, U.S.; 30.1983425°N 97.6479301°W
- Status: Operational
- Population: 2,147
- Managed by: Travis County Sheriff's Office

The Travis County Corrections Bureau encompasses two correctional facilities managed by the Travis County Sheriff's Office in Travis County, Texas: the Travis County Jail, a central booking facility in downtown Austin, and the Travis County Correctional Complex in Del Valle.

== History ==
The first jail in Travis County was authorized in 1847 and constructed on what is now known as the Old Courthouse block of downtown Austin. When this facility was destroyed by a fire in 1855, a new jail was built on the site the following year. This iteration of the jail and county courthouse lasted until 1906.

A new county jail was constructed on the intersection of 11th Street and Brazos Street, near the new courthouse on 11th Street and Congress Avenue. These facilities lasted until 1931, when the State of Texas offered Travis County land for a courthouse to break its existing lease for the courthouse and jail. The resulting Travis County Courthouse is still in use today, but the courthouse jail closed in 1990 due to a 1972 lawsuit which deemed a jail above a county courthouse unconstitutional.

A bond for a new jail was passed in 1978, and the new jail opened in July 1986. Because of overflow, a new facility with a capacity of 96 inmates was established in Del Valle, Texas. Now known as the Travis County Correctional Complex, the Del Valle facilities have expanded to a capacity of 2,300 inmates.

A plan for separate women's facilities at the Travis County Correctional Complex was proposed in 2016, but scrapped by 2021.

In 2021, the Austin-American Statesman reported on at least two potentially unusual inmate deaths in Travis County. Ronald Hall in 2018, and Tyler Allen Grist in 2019, were both reported by corrections officers to have died by deliberately striking their own heads against surfaces in their padded cells. In both cases, officers reported being unaware of the inmates' alleged self-harm until severe trauma had been inflicted. Grist, according to a Travis County corrections report, "deliberately fell backwards three times," resulting in fatal injuries. Both deaths were ruled as suicides. The Travis County district attorney's office brought Grist's death before a grand jury in 2021, stating that, while jail deaths are rarely brought before a grand jury, they believed there was enough evidence to take the case to trial. The grand jury failed to indict the corrections officer and nurse involved in the incident.

In 2023, the Travis County Commissioner's Court approved a pilot diversion center as an alternative to jail for individuals experiencing a mental health crisis. The program began operations in early 2024.
