= AMT Backup =

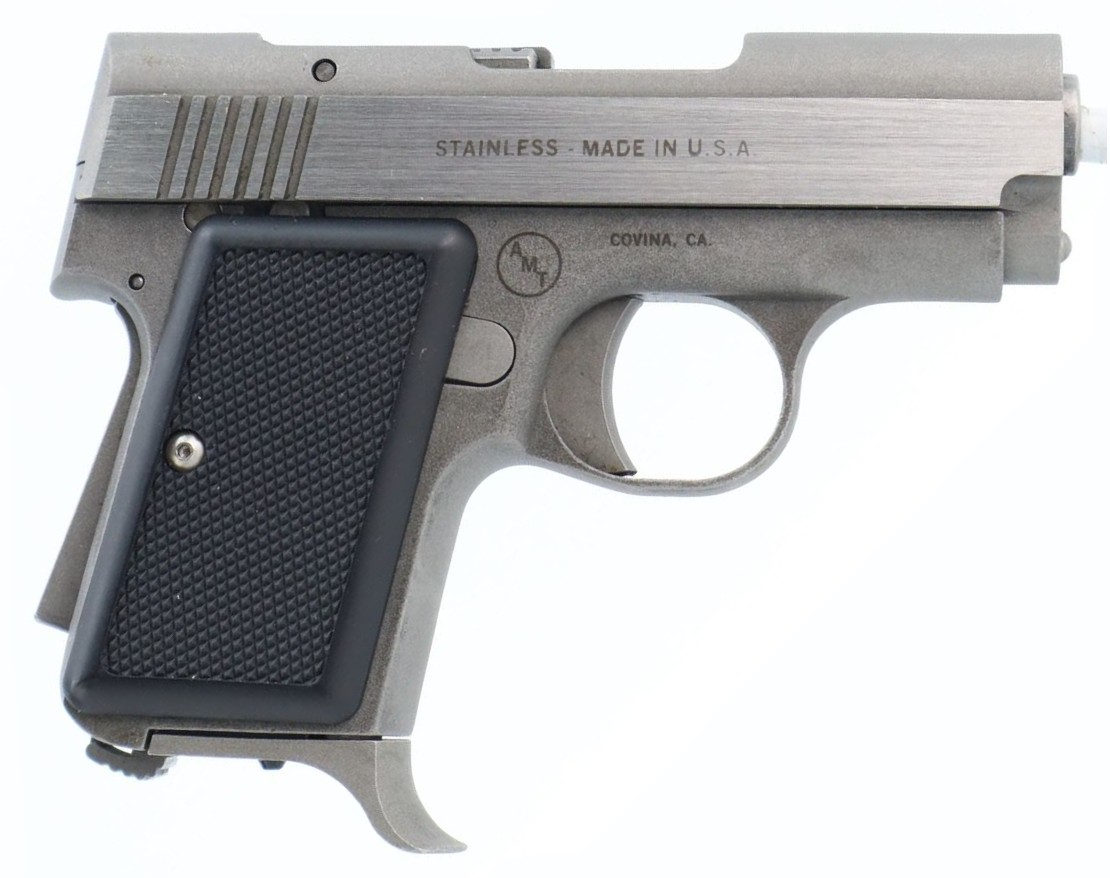
- AMT Backup in .380 ACP
- Type: Semi-automatic pistol
- Place of origin: United States

Production history
- Designed: 1978
- Manufacturer: AMT; Galena Industries; High Standard Manufacturing

Specifications
- Mass: 18 oz (0.51 kg)
- Length: 5 inches (13 cm)
- Cartridge: .22 LR.380 ACP.38 Super; 9×19mm.357 SIG.40 S&W.400 Corbon.45 ACP
- Feed system: 8 rounds (.22 LR); 6 rounds (.38 Super, 9mm, .357 SIG); 5 rounds (.380 ACP, .40 S&W, .400 Corbon, .45 ACP)
- Sights: Fixed

The AMT Backup is a small semi-automatic pistol. It was first manufactured by the Ordnance Manufacturing Corporation (OMC) of El Monte, CA. The first guns made in .380 ACP by OMC are known as the OMC Backup. OMC produced a short run of these pistols before the tooling was purchased by Arcadia Machine & Tool, who took over production. AMT .380 ACP Backup pistols were made by AMT in El Monte, Covina California, and Irwindale, CA.

The original AMT Backup was produced with a single-action only (SAO) trigger mechanism, while the later "Small Frame" and "Large Frame" Backup used a double-action-only (DAO) mechanism. These pistols were manufactured by AMT and later Galena Industries (until November 2001). SAO pistols were made with a manual safety, while DAO guns relied on their heavy trigger pull for safe handling.

The AMT Backup was available in a wide range of calibers: .22 LR, .380 ACP, .38 Super, 9×19mm, .357 SIG, .40 S&W, .400 Corbon and .45 ACP have all been offered.

The pistol's marketing slogan was "the smallest, most powerful" backup weapon available (referring to the .45 ACP version).

The AMT Backup line of handguns were being marketed by High Standard Manufacturing.
