= Dossier Journal =

American publication

Dossier Magazine (formerly Dossier Journal)
- Issue #3 cover
- Editor-in-Chief: Skye Parrott
- Categories: Travel and culture
- Frequency: Bi-annual
- First issue: 2008
- Company: Dossier Projects
- Country: United States
- Based in: New York
- Language: English
- Website: https://www.dossiermagazine.com
- ISSN: 1941-5109

Dossier Magazine (formerly Dossier Journal) is an independently published travel and culture magazine. Dossier Journal published from 2008 to 2015, featuring a mix of fashion, art and creative writing. It was relaunched in 2024 as a travel and culture publication under the name Dossier Magazine.

== History ==
Dossier was launched by Skye Parrott and Katherine Krause in 2008 with a team that included managing editor Erin Dixon and executive creative director Alex Wiederin.

In April 2009, Dossier opened a concept store on DeKalb Avenue in Brooklyn, New York, Dossier Shop, a collaboration between the founders and Molly McIver In May 2011, Barnes & Noble censored an issue of Dossier Journal because its front cover featured androgynous model Andrej Pejic partially nude. In 2014, Dossier did a takeover of the South Street Seaport neighborhood, curating a rotation of shops and programming for the summer. In September 2014, Dossier Journal launched a pop-up retail store in New York with Etsy.

In 2024, Dossier Magazine relaunched as a travel and culture publication, publishing a biannual print magazine and weekly newsletter.

== Contributors ==
Contributors have included Sherman Alexie, Jonathan Ames, David Armstrong, Matthew Dickman, Jennifer Egan, Nan Goldin, Kim Gordon, Rachel Maddow, Michael McKimm, Asako Narahashi, Yiyun Li, Michael Pollan, Robert Longo, Pamela Love, Zac Posen, Collier Schorr, Tom Sleigh, Alice Waters and Francesca Woodman.
