= Brunswick and Birmingham Railroad =

Defunct railroad in Georgia

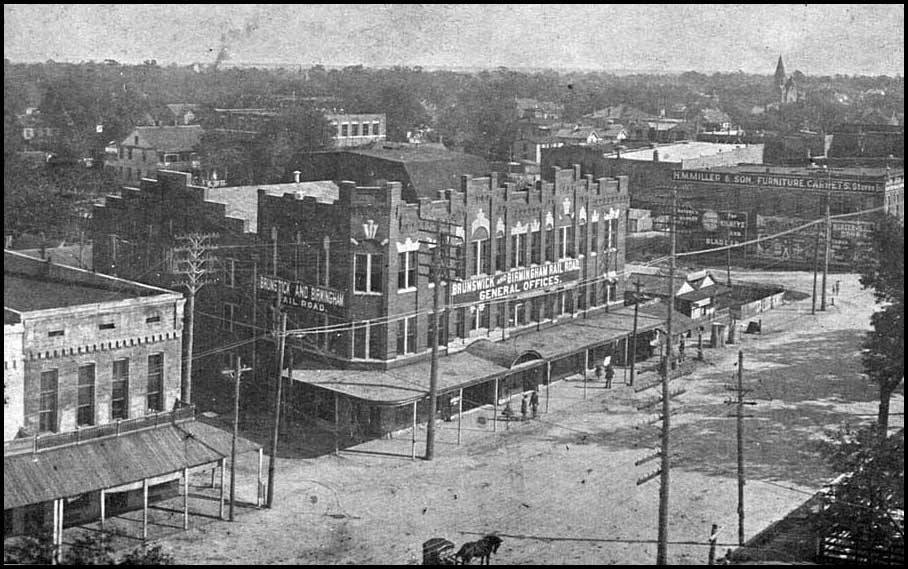
- Brunswick headquarters in the early 1900s

Overview
- Dates of operation: 1902–1904
- Successor: Atlantic and Birmingham Railway

Technical
- Track gauge: 4 ft 8 1/2 in (1,435 mm) standard gauge

The Brunswick and Birmingham Railroad (B&B) was a railroad in southeastern United States. Its main route ran from Brunswick, Georgia to Sessoms (just east of Nicholls, Georgia).

== History ==
The Brunswick and Birmingham Railroad was chartered on December 11, 1900. In 1902–03, it built a 49-mile (79 km) line from Brunswick, Georgia to Offerman, Georgia and a 19-mile (31 km) line from Bushnell, Georgia to Ocilla, Georgia. The B&B purchased the Offerman and Western Railroad on July 1, 1902, and the Ocilla and Irwinville Railroad on February 19, 1903. The railroad ran into financial troubles and was purchased by the Atlantic and Birmingham Railway in April 1904.

The Atlantic and Birmingham then became part of the Atlanta, Birmingham and Atlantic Railroad (AB&A) when it took over the A&B network on April 12, 1906. The Atlanta, Birmingham and Atlantic Railroad was acquired by the Atlantic Coast Line Railroad in 1926. The Atlantic Coast Line operated the AB&A network as the Atlanta, Birmingham and Coast Railroad (AB&C) until 1946, when they fully merged the AB&C into the Atlantic Coast Line Railroad. This gave the Atlantic Coast Line a second line to Brunswick (their first route to Brunswick was the former Brunswick and Western Railroad).

The segment of the line built between Brunswick, Georgia and Alma, Georgia was abandoned by the Atlantic Coast Line Railroad in 1953. The remainder of the line survived the 1967 merger of the ACL and Seaboard Air Line Railroad (SAL) to form the Seaboard Coast Line Railroad, and the acquisition of the Family Lines (CRR, L&N, GA, AWP) into the Seaboard System Railroad in 1982. The remaining segment was known as the Alma Subdivision. After the Seaboard System became CSX Transportation, the line between Sessoms and Alma was abandoned in 1986.

== Current conditions ==
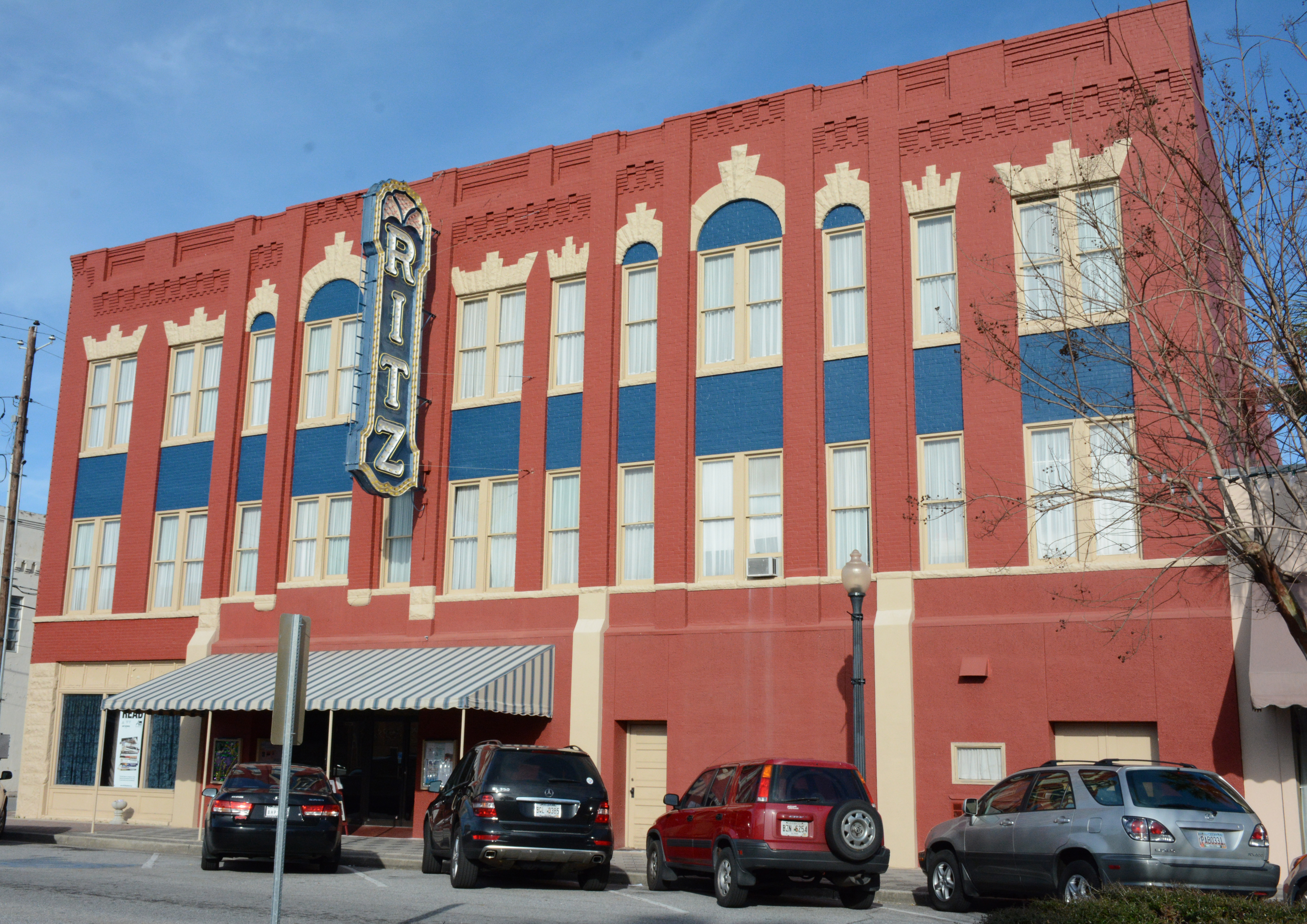
The former headquarters building in 2015

The railroad's former headquarters are today the Ritz Theatre in the Brunswick Old Town Historic District.

A small segment of the line in Brunswick south of Southern Junction is still in service and is part of CSX's Brunswick Subdivision (which primarily uses the former Brunswick and Western Railroad north and west of Southern Junction).

Much of the railroad's former right of way parallels State Route 32 and much of it is now a power line corridor.

== Historic stations ==
Milepost	City/Location	Station	Connections and notes
AOB 532.0	Brunswick	Brunswick	
AOB 538.0	Brunswick	Brunswick Yard	
AOB 541.0		Southern Junction	junction with: Macon and Brunswick Railroad (SOU); Brunswick and Western Railroad (SF&W/ACL)
AOB 543.0		Greenland	
AOB 544.4		Brobston	
AOB 545.9		Buffalo	
AOB 547.8	Anguilla	Anguilla	
AOB 549.0		Leicht	
AOB 551.2		Blunt	
AOB 553.0	Thalmann	Thalmann	junction with Seaboard Air Line Railroad Main Line
AOB 555.7		Lott	
AOB 559.1		Browntown	
AOB 560.4		Old Grade	
AOB 563.0		Fendig	
AOB 566.0		Needmore	
AOB 570.0	Hortense	Hortense	junction with Atlantic Coast Line Railroad Main Line
AOB 574.0		Giles	
AOB 575.8	Zirkle	Zirkle	
AOB 581.0	Offerman	Offerman	junction with Atlantic Coast Line Railroad Jesup—Folkston Line
AOB 585.0		Aspinwall	
AOB 587.6	Bristol	Bristol	
AOB 591.4		Woods	
AOB 592.4	Mershon	Mershon	
AOB 592.7		Bynum	
AOB 594.6	Coffee	Coffee	
AOB 599.5		New Lacy	
AOB 602.1	Rockingham	Rockingham	
AOB 605.4	Alma	Alma	
AOB 606.1		Southern Pines	
AOB 609.2		Guysie	
AOB 613.0		Sessoms	junction with Waycross Air Line Railroad (AB&C/ACL)
