= Zirkle =

Zirkle is an extinct town in Pierce County, Georgia, United States.

Zirkle may also refer to:

== People ==
=== Surname ===
- Alfred Terry Zirkle, American entrepreneur
- Aliy Zirkle (born 1970), American sled dog racing champion
- Conway Zirkle (1895–1972), American botanist and historian of science
- Matthew Zirkle, rear admiral of the United States Navy
- Raymond E. Zirkle (1902–1988), American biologist
- Wade Zirkle, American military veteran

== Places ==
- Bowman–Zirkle Farm, a historic house in Virginia, United States
- Zirkle Mill, United States historic place
