= La Jolla Country Day School =

Private secondary school in San Diego, California, United States

Coordinates: 32°52′42″N 117°13′1″W

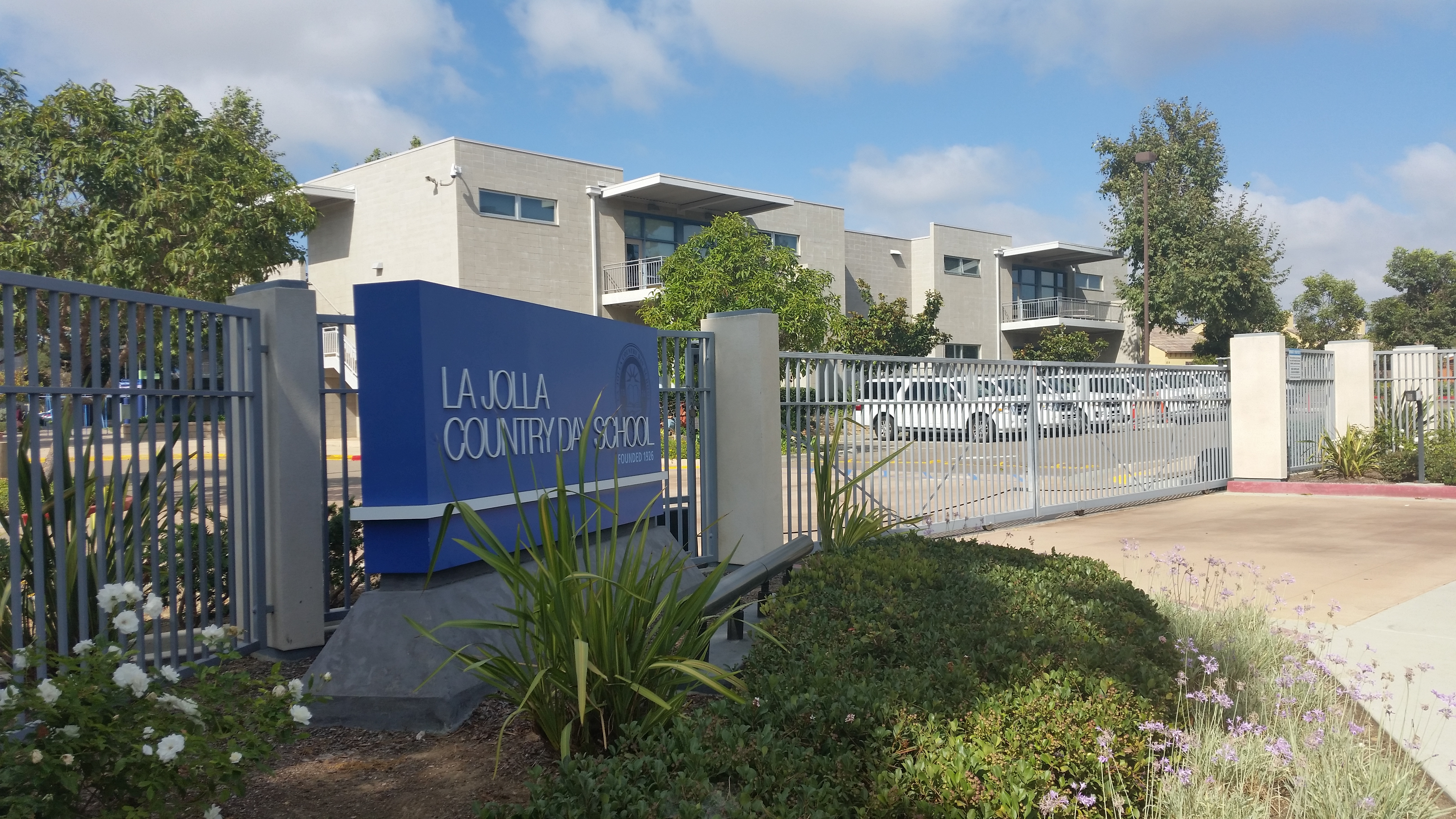
- Entrance sign
- 9490 Genesee Ave; La Jolla, CA 92037

Information
- Type: Independent/Private
- Motto: Scientia Pacifica (Peace through Knowledge)
- Established: 1926 (as the Balmer School)
- Head of school: Jeff Terwin
- Grades: Age 3 through Grade 12
- Enrollment: 1,120
- Colors: Royal Blue and white
- Mascot: Torrey pine
- Website: www.ljcds.org

La Jolla Country Day School (known informally as "Country Day" or "LJCDS") is an independent school in University City, a community of San Diego, California. The school contains a lower school (consisting of nursery through fourth grade), a middle school (grades 5–8), and an upper school (grades 9–12).

The school's motto is "Scientia Pacifica" (peace through knowledge).

La Jolla Country Day School was voted the best private school in San Diego in 2007 by The San Diego Union-Tribune.

== History ==
In 1926, Louise Balmer moved to California from Illinois with her four children after the death of her husband, and earned her teaching certificate. Establishing the Balmer School, she used a one-room cottage on Coast Boulevard as a makeshift schoolhouse for four students and three teachers. Balmer, an alumna of Bryn Mawr College, was an expert on the Winnetka Plan, a learning model that advocated for innovative pedagogies in the classroom, expanding education to include creative activities and an emphasis on the socioemotional development of each child.

By 1942, the Balmer School expanded, eventually holding classes in kindergarten through fifth grade in Wisteria Cottage, which had been redesigned by famed architect Irving Gill and is now the home of the La Jolla Historical Society on Prospect Street.

In 1955, the school received its charter to teach middle and upper school classes, and in 1961 moved to its current location. The first class of high school seniors graduated in 1964.

A new chapter of La Jolla Country Day School began in 1957 when it welcomed new headmaster Don Leavenworth, who brought with him new school traditions. The young Yale alumnus established the school’s official colors as white and blue (inspired by his alma mater), added a French language program, offered optional uniforms, and started a letterman sweater day on Fridays.

Over the course of the school’s history, many notable public figures have visited the school, such as Theodor Geisel, better known as Dr. Seuss, who visited the campus to find inspiration for new characters in his stories. Jonas Salk, developer of the polio vaccine, addressed the first graduating class as commencement speaker and revisited the campus 20 years later to dedicate the student-built observatory. Actor Debbie Reynolds filmed her television special Debbie Reynolds and the Sound of Children on campus in 1969. The film featured nearly all 500 of the school’s students, along with her own children, Carrie and Todd Fisher.

== Accreditation ==
La Jolla Country Day School is accredited by the California Association of Independent Schools (CAIS) and the Western Association of Schools and Colleges (WASC). In addition, the school is a member of the National Association of Independent Schools (NAIS) and the Council for the Advancement and Support of Education (CASE).

== Academics ==
La Jolla Country Day offers more than 25 Honors courses and 28 Advanced Placement courses in the Upper School. 87% of LJCDS AP students received scores of 3 or higher. In 2019–2020, a total of $5.1 million of financial assistance was given out to students and their families.

=== Reputation and Rankings ===
The Class of 2024 had over 630 college acceptances.

== Campus ==
The campus spans 24 acres and now contains a theater, a library, an outdoor amphitheater, a double gymnasium, a football field, soccer field, baseball field, softball field, 6 tennis courts, a maker's lab, art studios, and computer and science labs.

== Student life ==
=== Extracurricular Activities ===
La Jolla Country Day students produce publications including the annual school yearbook, the school newspaper The Palette, and a literary magazine Pegasus. LJCDS also publishes an alumni publication, 1926.

=== Athletics ===
La Jolla Country Day School won its first athletic championship in 1966. Since then, Torrey athletes have won a total of 193 championships: 115 League Championships, 57 CIF Championships, 14 Southern Regional Championships, and 7 California State Championships. Currently in 2020-2021, 69 of its graduates are competing at colleges and universities around the nation with 10 alumns at Ivy League universities and 8 alums in "Power-5" conferences.

Students participate at a rate that is among California’s highest; 80 percent of the Upper School and 98 percent of the Middle School students participated in at least one athletic team in 2019–20 with 140 Upper School students playing two sports and 26 earning triathlete recognition.

The school has 55 varsity, junior-varsity (JV) and club sports teams, including football, cheerleading, basketball, field hockey, rock climbing, lacrosse, tennis, cross country, track & field, soccer, baseball, softball, volleyball, swimming, surf, sailing, dance, and yoga. Athletics are divided into fall, winter, and spring sports, with some programs holding practices during all three seasons.

=== Visual & Performing Arts ===
There are over 50 performances and art exhibitions each school year such as the upper school drama performances, musicals, dance programs, marching band, orchestra, glee club, and choir. The Upper School offers 17 introductory courses in the arts and 15 AP, advanced, honors and student-run classes. The Middle and Lower Schools offer 9 after-school art programs in addition to in-school teachings. In 2020, there are 10 Artist-in-Residence Day and year-long immersive experiences.

== Notable alumni ==
- Tucker Carlson (attended c. 1976), conservative political commentator, author
- Matthew Zirkle 1981, Rear Admiral, U.S. Navy and Chief of Staff for U.S. Naval Forces Europe/Africa and U.S. SIXTH Fleet
- Jandy Nelson 1983, author of young adult fiction including The Sky Is Everywhere and I'll Give You the Sun
- Emma Caulfield 1991, actress, best known for her role as Anya Jenkins on the TV series Buffy the Vampire Slayer
- David Chan 1991, violinist, concertmaster of the Metropolitan Opera Orchestra
- Victor Cheng 1991, former McKinsey & Company management consultant
- Kate Dillon Levin 1992, the first plus-size model to appear in U.S. Vogue and a Gucci campaign
- Jared Polis 1993, Governor of Colorado
- Rashaan Salaam 1992, running back in the NFL, winner of the 1994 Heisman Trophy
- Cassie Mogilner Holmes, 1998, professor of psychology at UCLA Anderson School of Management
- Alexandra Stevenson 1999, professional tennis player; former top-20 player in singles
- Diego Rovira 2000, former indoor soccer player for the San Diego Sockers
- Candice Wiggins 2004, former professional basketball player; winner of the 2011 WNBA Championship
- Chrystina Sayers 2005, singer, member of the girl group Girlicious
- Miles McMillan 2007, painter and model, Daily Front Row's 2016 Model of the Year
- Kelsey Plum 2013, current guard for the Los Angeles Sparks; former career scoring leader in NCAA Division I women's basketball
- Tommy Edman 2013, current professional baseball player for the Los Angeles Dodgers
- Te-Hina Paopao 2020, college basketball player for the South Carolina Gamecocks

== See also ==
- Primary and secondary schools in San Diego, California
