= The Scroll =

The Scroll may refer to:

- School newspaper for The American School in London
- Newspaper for Brigham Young University–Idaho
- Official magazine of Phi Delta Theta fraternity
