= Ritz Theatre (Brunswick, Georgia) =

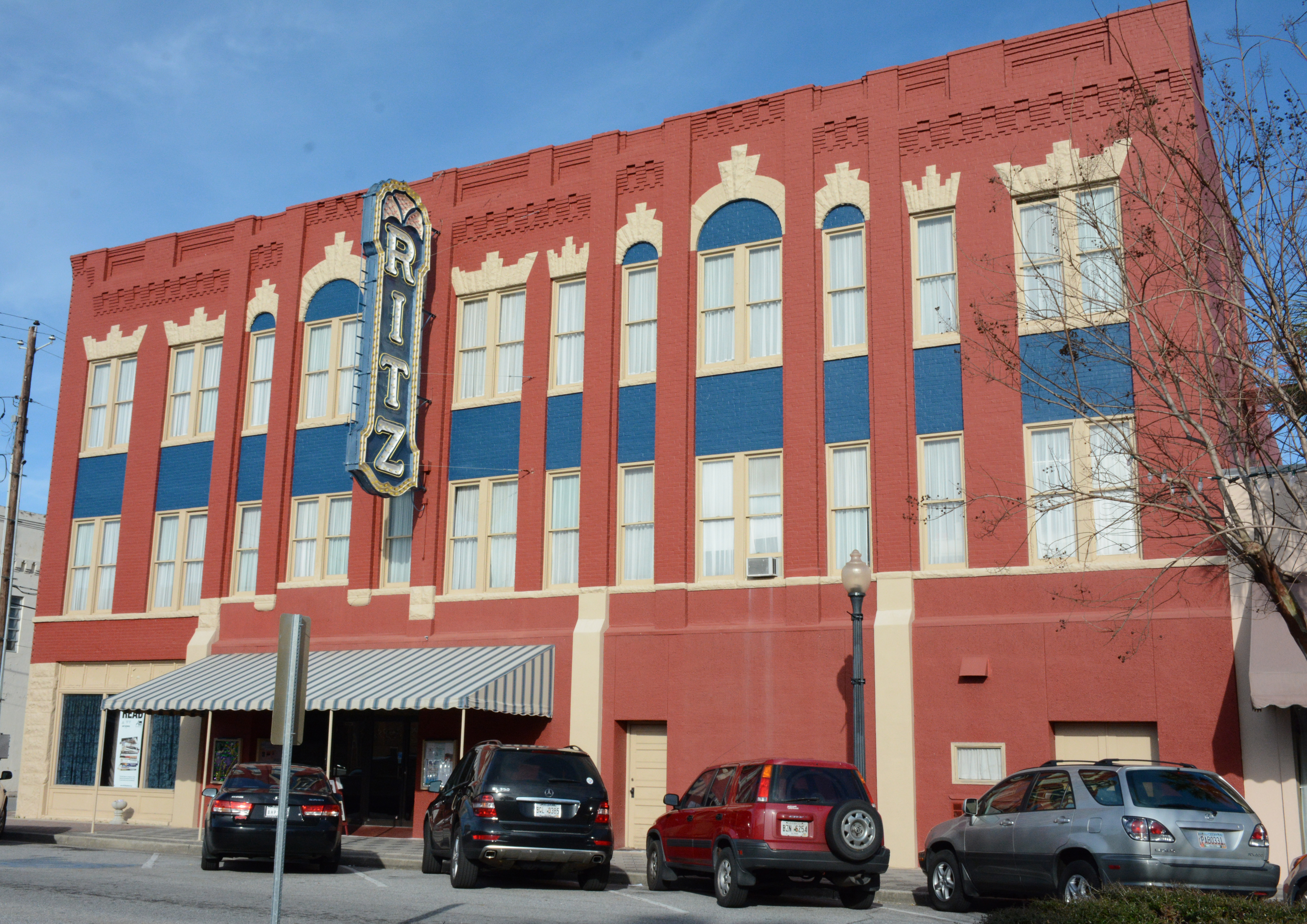
- Ritz Theatre (2015)

- Location within Georgia Location within the United States
- Former names: Grand Opera House

General information
- Location: 1530 Newcastle Street, Brunswick, Georgia, United States
- Coordinates: 31.150351°N 81.495483°W
- Completed: 1899

Technical details
- Floor count: 3
- Ritz Theatre
- U.S. Historic district – Contributing property
- Part of: Brunswick Old Town Historic District (ID79000727)
- Designated CP: April 26, 1979

The Ritz Theatre is a historic theater in Brunswick, Georgia. Built in 1899, it originally served as an opera house, but was later converted to a movie palace. The building is currently owned by the city of Brunswick and is a contributing property of the Brunswick Old Town Historic District.

== History ==
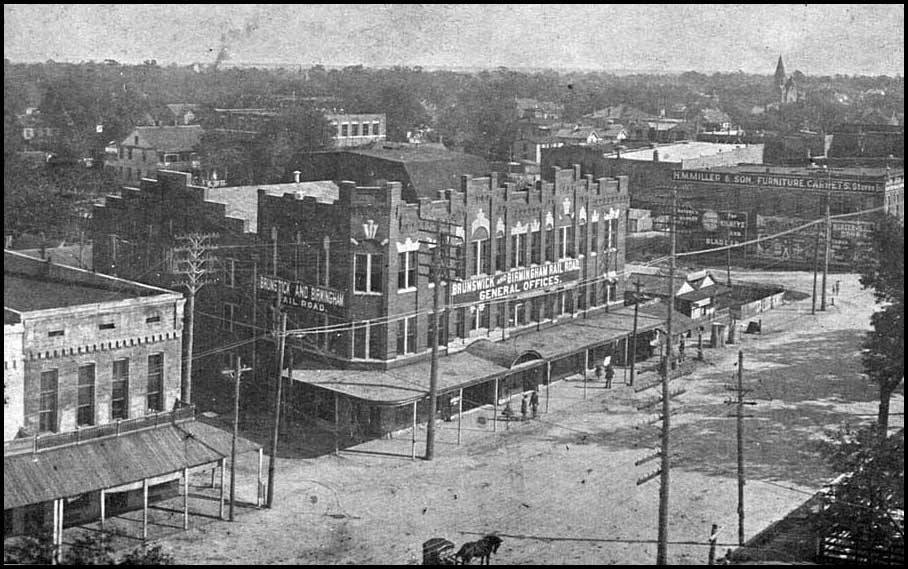
General offices of the Brunswick and Birmingham Railroad, c. 1900

The Grand Opera House was built in 1899 as the main opera house in Brunswick, Georgia. Plans for the construction of the building had been in place since 1895, and the building served as a replacement for the L'Arioso Opera House, which had been destroyed by a storm in 1896. In addition to the theater, the building housed several retailers on its first floor, and the second and third floors served as the general offices of the Brunswick and Birmingham Railroad. Following renovations in the 1920s or 1930s that included the installation of a marquee, the building was renamed the Ritz Theatre and converted to a movie palace. During this time, the theater was segregated, with African Americans allowed to enter the building through a separate door and view showings from the balcony.

In 1980, the city of Brunswick bought the property, and since 1989 it has been managed by the Golden Isles Arts and Humanities Association. Today, live performances, movie screenings, and other art exhibits are held at the venue.
