= Lover's Oak =

Historic and large Southern live oak in Brunswick, Georgia

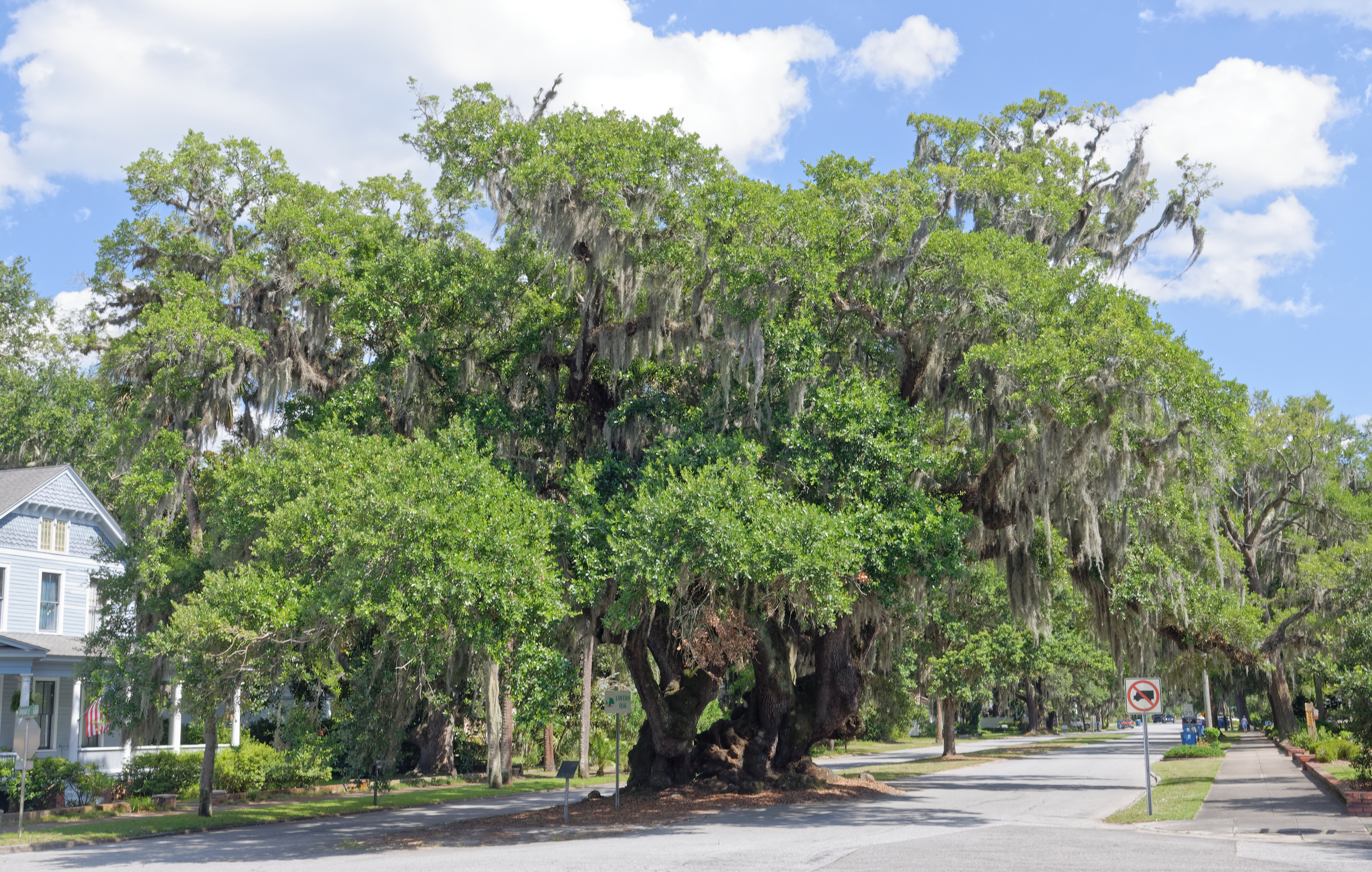
- Lover's Oak (2020)

- Location within Georgia Location within the United States
- Species: Southern live oak (Quercus virginiana)
- Location: Brunswick, Georgia
- Coordinates: 31.14236°N 81.48655°W
- Diameter: 13 ft (4.0 m)

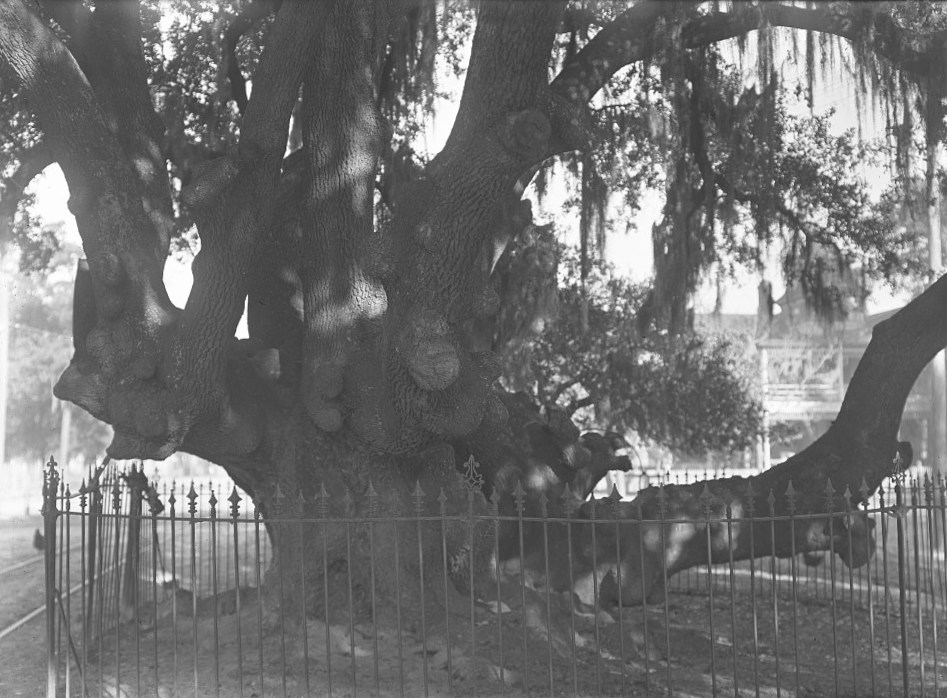
Lover's Oak in 1910

The Lover's Oak is a notably historic and large southern live oak tree in Brunswick, Georgia. Located in the Brunswick Old Town Historic District, the tree is reportedly over 900 years old. The tree has a trunk diameter of 13 feet (4.0 m) and has 10 main limbs.

== History ==
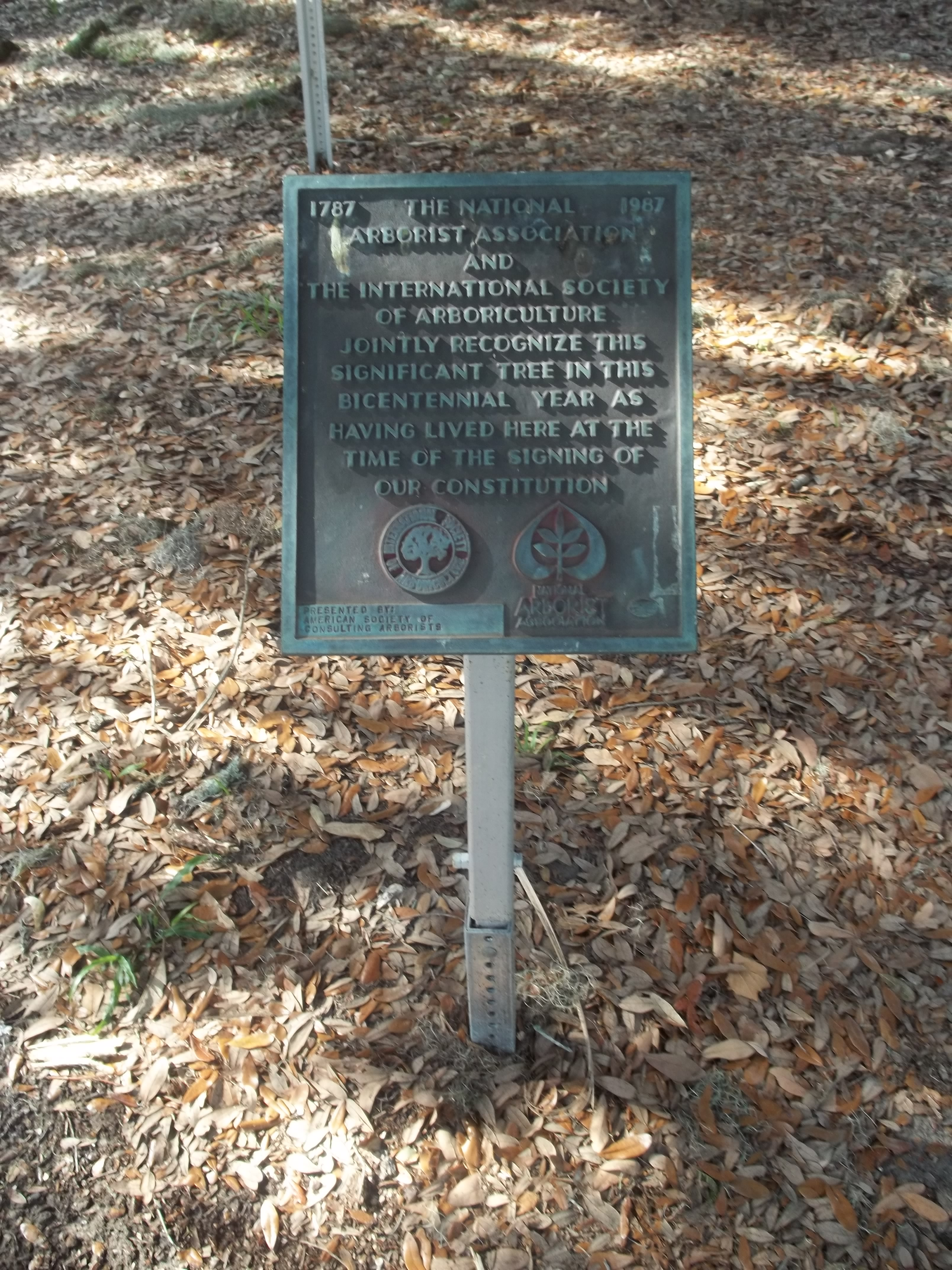
Lover's Oak plaque

The tree is estimated to be from the 12th century AD, with an age of approximately 900 years. The tree's name stems from a Native American legend alleging the tree as the meeting place between young lovers. The location of the tree is just south of the intersection of Prince Street and Albany Street, placing it in the Brunswick Old Town Historic District. It is actually in the middle of Albany Street. In 1987, the National Arborist Association erected a plaque near the tree, recognizing that the tree had been standing since the signing of the United States Constitution 200 years earlier in 1787. In 2015, a semi truck crashed into the tree and removed one of its limbs.

== See also ==
- List of individual trees
- Lanier's Oak
