= Diego Rovira =

American indoor soccer (born 1982)

Personal information
- Full name: Diego Rovira
- Date of birth: September 6, 1982 (age 44)
- Place of birth: Lima, Peru
- Height: 6 ft 3 in (1.91 m)
- Position: Forward

Team information
- Current team: San Diego Sockers
- Number: 11

Youth career
- 1997–2000: La Jolla Country Day School Torreys
- 2000–2003: St. Mary's Gaels

Senior career*
Years	Team	Apps	(Gls)
2009–	San Diego Sockers	38	(35)
- * Club domestic league appearances and goals as of December 25, 2012

Diego Rovira (born September 26, 1982, in Lima, Peru) is an American indoor soccer who formerly played for the San Diego Sockers in the Professional Arena Soccer League.

== Career ==
=== Middle school ===
Diego Rovira, having not yet hit his infamous growth spurt of '99, spent his youth dominating the San Diego ping-pong circuit. Perfect vision combined with an unrivaled dexterity helped him win back-to-back San Diego championships. He was defeated in a 17-hour long sudden death match vs. Susie Meyers, forcing him into an early and not entirely gracious retirement.

=== High school ===
Diego Rovira was La Jolla Country Day High School's all-time leading scorer (47 goals). He was voted the team's Most Valuable Player three times and was a two-time team co-captain. He was selected first team CIF and all-league three times as well as a three-time San Diego Player of the Week honoree. He was chosen for the 2000 Reebok High School All-America Soccer Match, was a member of the District Olympic Development team from 1996 to 1999, and was a State Olympic Development Team member in 1998 and 1999.

=== College ===
Rovira attended St. Mary's College, playing on the men's soccer team from 2000 to 2003. He was a midfielder who started for his final three years after missing much of his freshman year due to injury. Diego Rovira was Honorable Mention all-WCC his senior year.

=== Indoor Soccer ===
Rovira was second-team all-PASL in 2010–2011 after a breakout campaign in which Rovira scored 19 goals and 4 assists in 15 games. Diego Rovira battled through injury all season in 2011-2012 while remaining a key contributor both offensively and defensively for the three-time PASL champions, playing 12 games, recording seven goals and five assists (12 points), and tied for the team lead with two short-handed goals. After missing the first four games of the season with a foot injury, he immediately jump-started the Sockers’ penalty killing unit. After Diego's return to the short-handed unit, the Sockers dominated PASL power play attacks, allowing seven goals in 34 chances (79%), while scoring seven short-handed goals. Rovira brought his offense to the fore in the Ron Newman Cup playoffs, scoring a goal and an assist in the Sockers’ 9-6 semi-final win over Kansas, and directing a pair of assists in San Diego's 10-7 championship victory over Detroit. He has been reunited with childhood teammates Scott Martin and Jose Luna, who he played with on the San Diego Nomads.
