= Ocilla and Irwinville Railroad =

The Ocilla and Irwinville Railroad was incorporated on October 4, 1900, and began operations the same year, operating an 11-mile line between Ocilla, Georgia, and Irwinville, Georgia. Operations by Ocilla and Irwinville ceased in July 1902. It had only one locomotive. The railroad was purchased on February 19, 1903, by the Brunswick and Birmingham Railroad. By 1916, the line was abandoned.
