= American School in London =

International school in London, England

Coordinates: 51.5348°N 0.1766°W

The American School in London
- London; United Kingdom

Information
- Type: International school Non-profit
- Established: 1951
- Department for Education URN: 101168 Tables
- CEEB code: 724412
- Grades: K–12
- Enrollment: 1,350
- Colors: Orange and Black
- Mascot: Eagle
- Alumni: 12,653
- Head of School: Matt Horvat
- Website: http://www.asl.org

The American School in London (ASL) is a private, independent school in St John's Wood, London, England, for students from kindergarten through high school.

ASL is accredited by the Department for Education and The Middle States Association of Colleges and Schools. ASL is a member of the National Association of Independent Schools, the Council of International Schools, the Independent Schools Association, and the Association for the Advancement of International Education.

The American School in London is amongst the U.K.’s most expensive day schools, with tuition fees set at £46,428 for Grades 9-12.

== History ==
The school was established in 1951 by journalist Stephen Eckard. Eckard, an American national, was employed by the BBC at the time. It was first situated in Eckard's home, and was a school primarily for 13 students. The school's colours, orange and black, are inspired by Eckard's alma mater, Princeton University. Prior to that, the school's official colours were red and black. In addition to changing colors, the school has also adopted the Eagle as their mascot. The newly-founded school soon added three teachers and moved to a space in London's Chelsea neighbourhood. The school's first graduation took place in 1960.

Visitors to the school have included U.S. Presidents Harry Truman, Ronald Reagan, Bill Clinton and Barack Obama during their visits to London.

According to the Good Schools Guide, 80% of the 1,350 students hold United States passports, and half of those are multi-passport holders from dual national families.

In 2021, The Head of the School Robin Appleby announced her resignation as the school had been accused of indoctrinating its pupils in critical race theory. Following a December 2021 inspection, the school was downgraded two ratings by Ofsted to "requires improvement". Ofsted had inspected the school following media reports of political indoctrination. While the school was found to give "strong importance to equality and inclusion", the report continued "Sometimes, however, teaching places much more weight on the school’s approach to social justice than on learning subject-specific knowledge and skills". Reporting on the teaching of humanities in the lower school, Ofsted found that pupils "spend much time repeatedly considering identity (including analysing their own characteristics) rather than learning, for example, geographical knowledge".

As of 2023, the school had maintained the "Outstanding" accreditation from Ofsted, which had been reinstated in November 2023.

== Current and former heads ==
- Stephen Eckard, founder, head of school 1951–1971
- Jack Harrison, head of school 1971–1986
- William E. Harris, head of school 1986–1991
- William Greenham, interim head of school 1991–1992
- Judith L. Glickman, head of school 1992–1998
- William C. Mules, head of school 1998–2007
- Coreen R. Hester, head of school 2007–2017
- Robin S. Appleby, head of school 2017–2021
- Coreen R. Hester, interim head of school 2022–2023
- Matt Horvat, head of school 2023–current

== Notable students ==
- Prabowo Subianto, 8th President of Indonesia, businessman, 4 star Army General and former Minister of Defence
- Devon Aoki, Japanese-American actress
- Dj Cuppy, Nigerian disc jockey, musician and producer
- Nina Axelrod, American actress
- Stewart Copeland, American musician, drummer for The Police
- R. Luke DuBois, American composer and artist
- Cassie Mogilner Holmes, professor at UCLA Anderson School of Management
- Steve-O, stunt performer and TV personality best known for Jackass
- Andrew Luck, NFL quarterback
- Lloyd Sam, professional association football player
- Laurie Styvers, American singer-songwriter
- Kathleen Turner, Hollywood actress, director, and two-time Golden Globe recipient
- Charles Walker, Conservative British Member of Parliament for Broxbourne
- Aditya Mittal, CEO, ArcelorMittal
- Stella Barey, adult actress

== See also ==
- Americans in the United Kingdom
