= Cassie Mogilner Holmes =

- Born: February 2, 1980 (age 46); San Diego, California
- Occupations: Professor of marketing and behavioral decision making

Academic background
- Education: Columbia University (BA); Stanford Graduate School of Business (PhD)
- Website: www.anderson.ucla.edu/faculty-and-research/marketing/faculty/mogilner-holmes www.cassiemholmes.com/

Cassie Mogilner Holmes (born February 2, 1980) is a professor of marketing and behavioral decision making at UCLA Anderson School of Management and author of Happier Hour. She is best known for her research on time and happiness. (e.g. time salience, age, ways to spend time, present focus, temporal distance, and time affluence).

== Early life and education ==
Mogilner Holmes grew up in San Diego, California, where she attended La Jolla Country Day School. For several years during elementary school, she and her family lived in London, where she attended the American School in London. She gave birth to her first son in 1999, and her second son in 2001. She earned her Bachelor of Arts in psychology in 2002 from Columbia University. In 2004, Mogilner Holmes began graduate work at Stanford Graduate School of Business studying under Jennifer Aaker, earning a Ph.D. in marketing in 2009. At Stanford GSB, she received the Jaedicke Award in 2004, and was chosen as the AMA-Sheth Foundation Doctoral Consortium Fellow in 2008.

== Career ==
After graduating with a PhD in marketing from Stanford Graduate School of Business in 2009, Mogilner Holmes began her academic career as an assistant professor at the Wharton School of the University of Pennsylvania, where she taught brand management. At Wharton, she was promoted to associate professor with tenure in 2015. In 2016, she moved back to California to join UCLA Anderson School of Management as an associate professor with tenure. At Anderson, she was appointed the Donnalisa '86 and Bill Barnum Endowed Term Chair in Management in 2018 and was promoted to full professor in 2020.

Among her awards, Mogilner Holmes was recognized as a Top 40 Business Professor Under 40 by Poets & Quants in 2018 and was the recipient of the Early Career Award from the Association of Consumer Research in 2016 and the Society of Consumer Psychology in 2017. She was recognized as a Marketing Science Institute Young Scholar in 2013 and won the Journal of Consumer Research Best Article Award in 2017.

Mogilner Holmes's research has been published in scholarly journals in psychology and marketing such as Journal of Consumer Research, Psychological Science, and Social Psychological and Personality Science. She has also written for Harvard Business Review, The Wall Street Journal, and The New York Times, and her work appears in The Economist, Financial Times, The Atlantic, Huffington Post, Scientific American, Time, and NPR.

Trained as a social psychologist, Mogilner Holmes's research focuses on the role of time for happiness. Her work provides empirically based knowledge to inform how individuals should think about and spend their time to make their lives better. Her research can be organized into three primary streams: 1) the effects of focusing on time (vs. money), 2) the effects of age (and the amount of time people feel like they have left in life), and 3) optimal ways of spending time.

Among her findings on the topic of time and happiness, her research has identified that merely thinking about time (vs. money) boosts consumers' happiness both with their products and in their lives; age influences the way people experience happiness (as peaceful vs. exciting) and the types of experiences (ordinary vs. extraordinary) that produce happiness; gifting time through experiences cultivates happiness in relationships; and to feel happier, people should spend their days on a variety of activities but their hours on more similar activities.

Professor Cassie Holmes is the author of the Wall Street Journal bestselling book, Happier Hour: How to Beat Distraction, Expand Your Time, and Focus on What Matters Most, which is based on her MBA course, Applying the Science of Happiness to Life Design. She also gave a TEDxManhattanBeach talk about how to find extraordinary happiness in ordinary moments.
