= Miles McMillan =

American actor and model (born 1989)

- Born: Miles Thomas McMillan; June 27, 1989 (age 37); La Jolla, California, U.S.
- Education: NYU
- Occupations: Model, painter, actor
- Years active: 2010–present
- Modeling information
- Height: 6 ft 2 in (188 cm)
- Hair color: Brown
- Eye color: Hazel
- Agency: IMG Models (Worldwide); Success Models (Paris); Elite Model Management (Milan); View Management (Barcelona); Stockholmsgruppen (Stockholm)

Miles Thomas McMillan (born June 27, 1989) is an American model, actor, and painter. In September 2016, he was named the Daily Front Row's "Model of the Year" at the Fashion Media Awards.

== Early life ==
McMillan was born and raised in La Jolla, California, where his father is a real estate developer with OliverMcMillan and his mother a psychologist.

After graduating from La Jolla Country Day School in 2007, he moved to New York City to study fine arts and painting, and received his bachelor's degree of fine arts from NYU Steinhardt.

== Career ==
In the summer of his junior year in college, he was approached by a photographer to shoot for Urban Outfitters. Not signed by an agency at the time, McMillan took up the offer. During his senior year, he got picked up by an agency. This was the official beginning of his modeling career.

In 2010, McMillan made his debut in the John Varvatos show in Milan, Italy. The following year, he opened and closed for Varvatos. He also walked for Alexander McQueen, Dior Homme, Rick Owens, Yohji Yamamoto, Lanvin, Paul Smith, and others.

Since then, McMillan has worked with photographers Mert and Marcus for LOVE magazine, Jack Pierson for Another magazine and Purple magazine, Steven Meisel for Vogue Italia, and Patrick Demarchelier for Vogue.

In 2016, he walked for Tom Ford's F/W 2016 show and closed Fendi in Milan. He appeared on the cover of the summer edition of the Daily Front Row magazine. He also appears in Tommy Hilfiger's fragrance The Girl ad campaign alongside Gigi Hadid. In late 2017, he was on the Christmas TV commercial spot for Zalando, alongside Edie Campbell.

== Personal life ==
McMillan began dating actor Zachary Quinto in the summer of 2013. In early 2015, the couple moved into a NoHo apartment in Manhattan that they purchased together. In November 2015 Vogue magazine called them "a power couple whose domain extends across the film, fashion, and art scene."

McMillan and Quinto also had a home in Upstate New York. McMillan used his time there to paint and take care of their two dogs, Skunk and Rocco. The relationship ended in early 2019.

== Filmography ==
Film
Year	Title	Role
2019	Fluidity	Lee
