= Stella Barey =

American pornographic film actress

- Born: San Juan Capistrano, California, U.S.
- Occupation: Pornographic film actress
- Years active: 2020–present

Stella Barey is an American pornographic film actress.

== Early life ==
Barey was born in San Juan Capistrano, California. Her mother is a gynecologist.

Barey studied at New York University, invented her own major – ethical healthcare systems and policy. Then she finished pre-med with the aim of becoming a gynecologist at University of California, Los Angeles.

== Career ==
In April 2025, she founded the platform Hidden, a sex worker-owned alternative to OnlyFans which has a user experience inspired by TikTok and Tumblr and aims to offer better revenue shares to creators.
