= Brunswick Old Town Historic District =

Historic district in Georgia, United States

- U.S. National Register of Historic Places
- U.S. Historic district
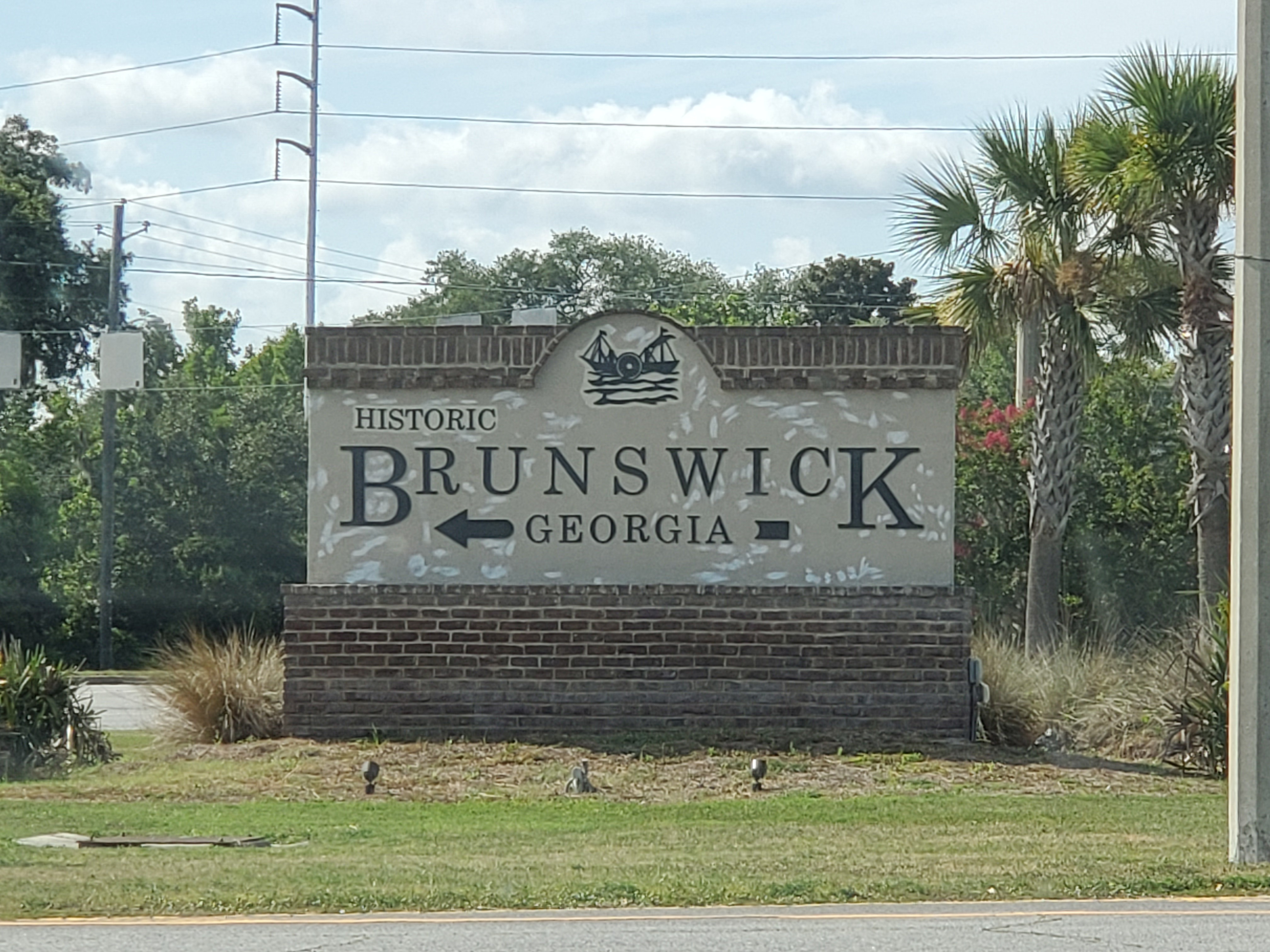
- Sign for Brunswick's historic district

- Location within Georgia Location within the United States
- Location: Roughly bounded by 1st, Bay, New Bay, H and Cochran Sts., Brunswick, Georgia
- Coordinates: 31°08′43″N 81°29′29″W
- Area: 289 acres (117 ha)
- Built: 1885
- Architectural style: Stick/eastlake, Queen Anne
- NRHP reference No.: 79000727
- Added to NRHP: April 26, 1979

Brunswick Old Town Historic District is a historic district in Brunswick, Georgia. It was added to the National Register of Historic Places on April 26, 1979 and includes an area bounded by 1st Street, Bay Street, New Bay Street, H Street, and Cochran Street (4th Ave. and G St., according to one source). Brunswick is one of Georgia's two deep-water ports and is the mainland city associated with the Golden Isles of Georgia, at the junction of I-95 and US 82.

The historic district includes the site of the colonial British town of Brunswick, named after the family of King George III of Great Britain. Formed in 1771, it retains its original grid plan (as does Savannah, Georgia). The district has 19th century residential and public buildings including the Hazelhurst-Taylor House in Hanover Square, the Mahoney-McGarvey House on Reynolds Street, and the Old Brunswick City Hall. Some of the sidewalks use hexagonal stone tiles.

== Photo gallery ==
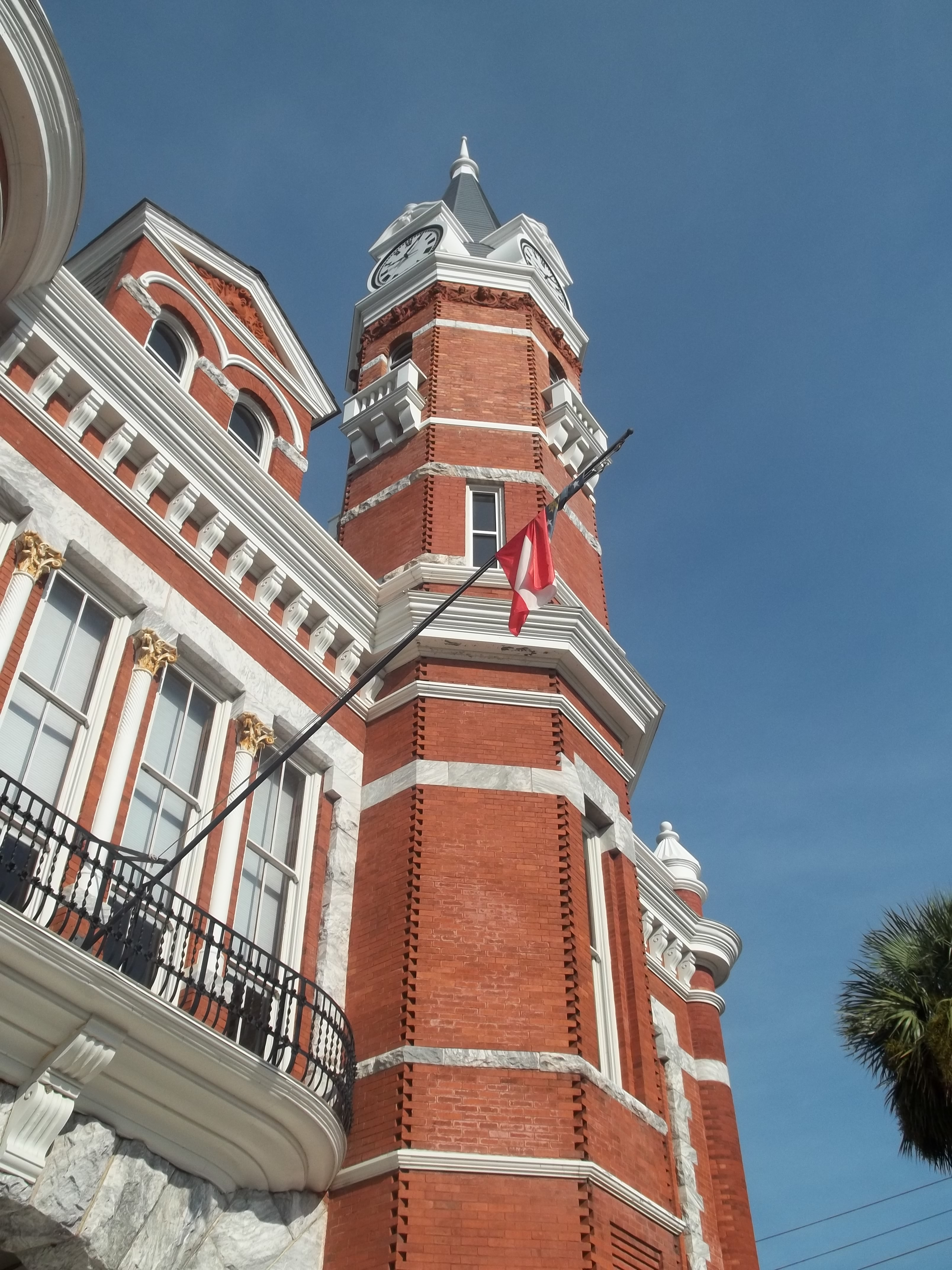
Brunswick Old City Hall

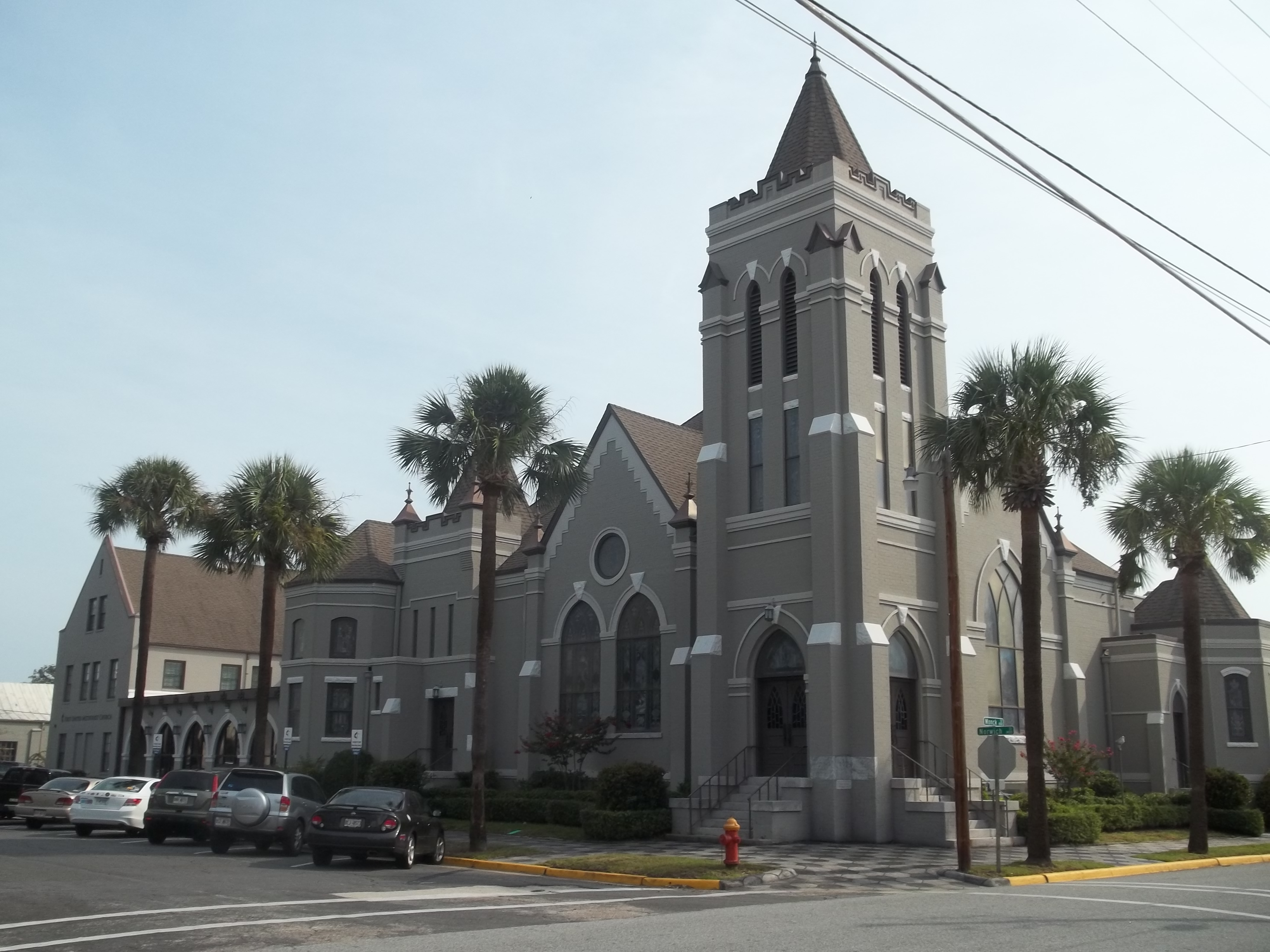
First Methodist Episcopal Church

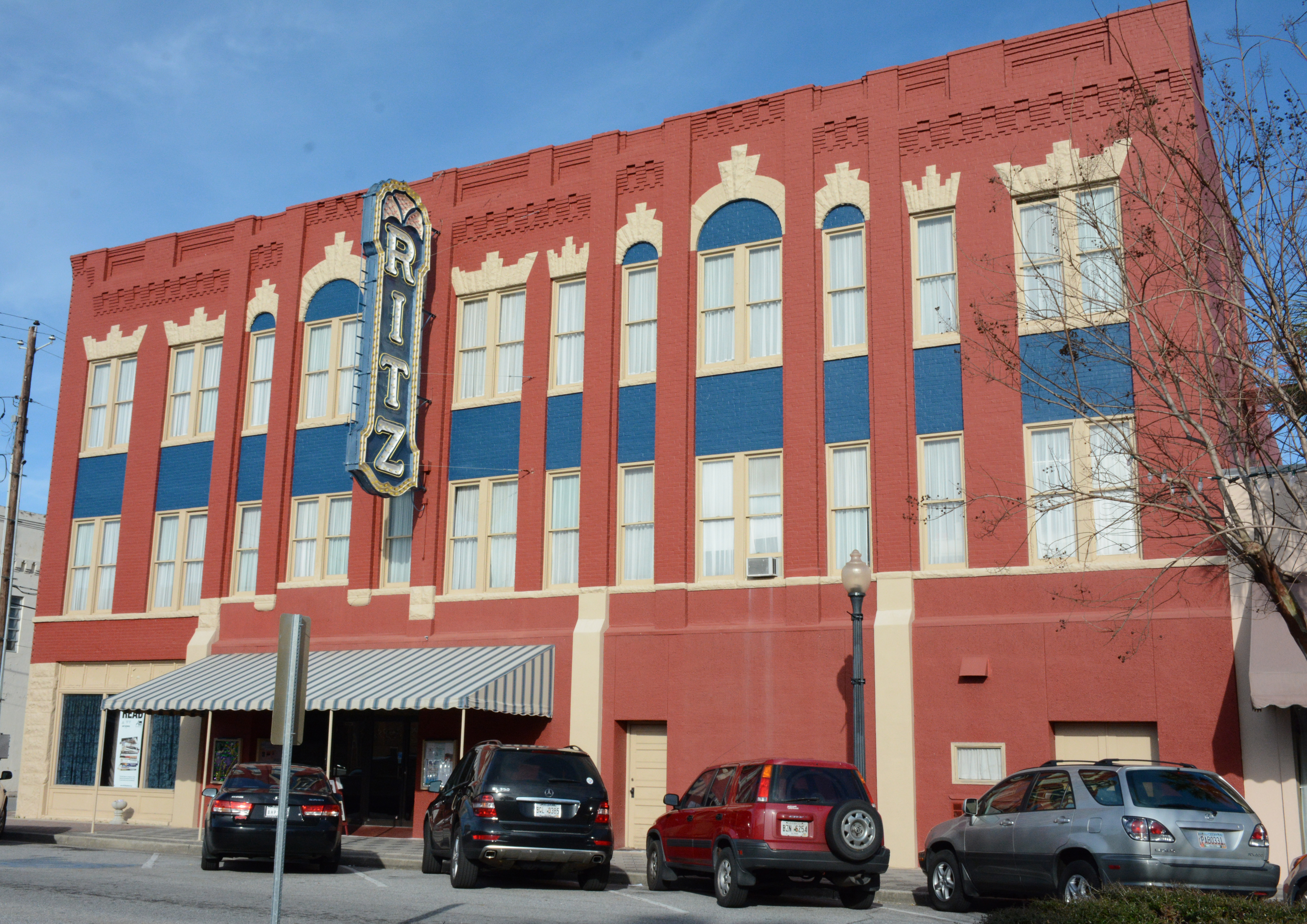
Ritz Theatre, originally the Grand Opera House

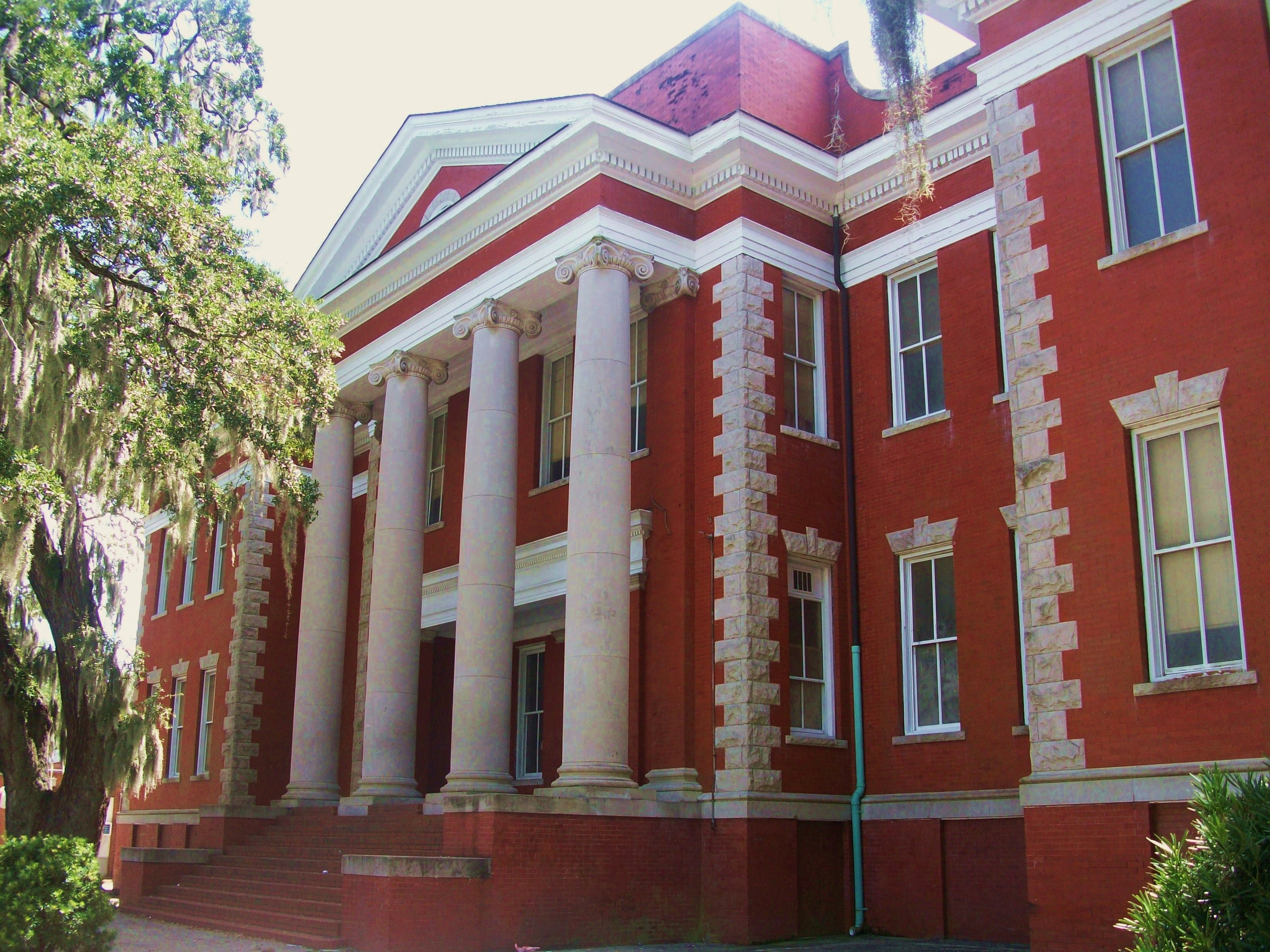
Prep building (1909) at Glynn Academy

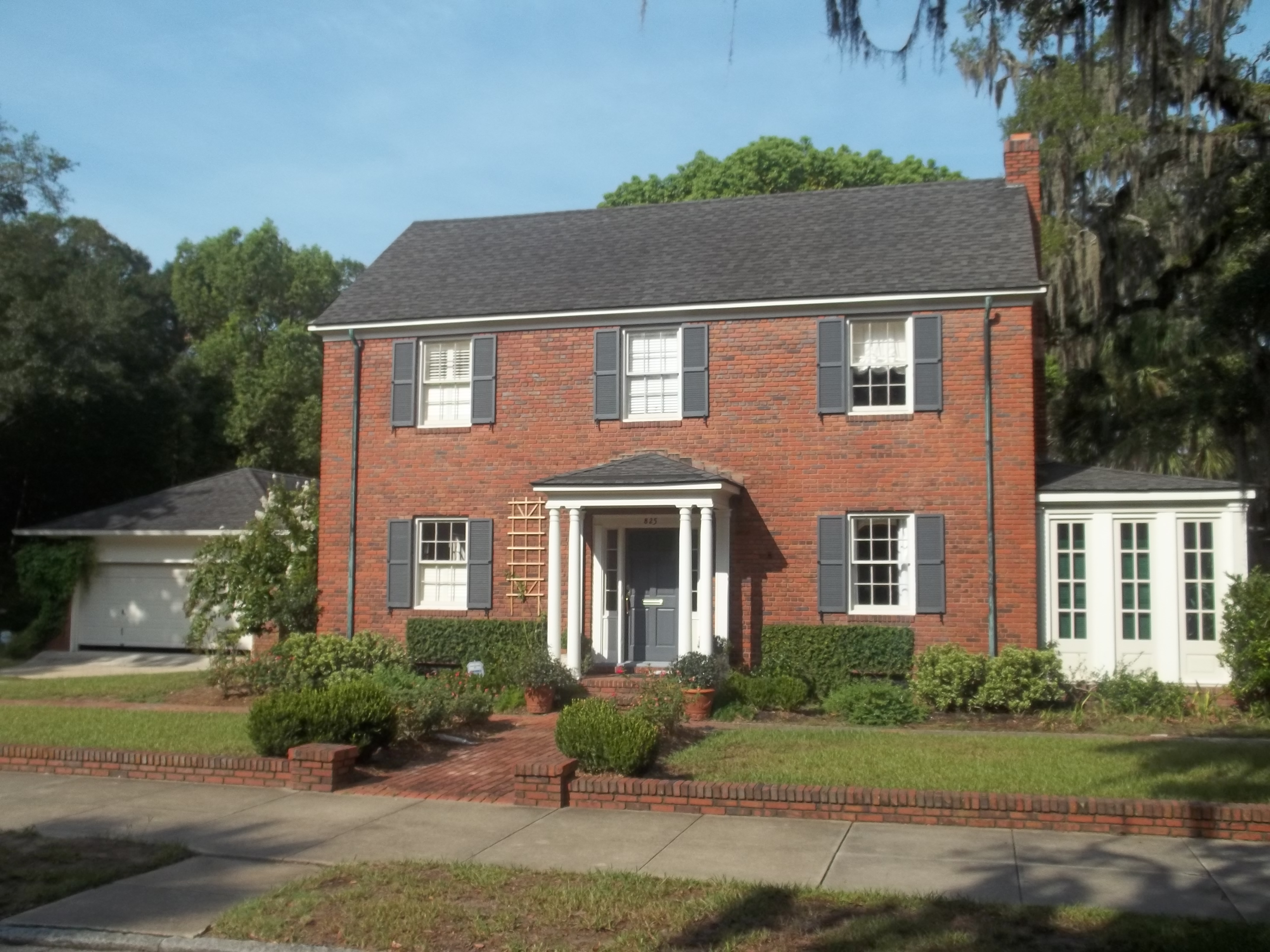
Brick house in the Brunswick Old Town Historic District

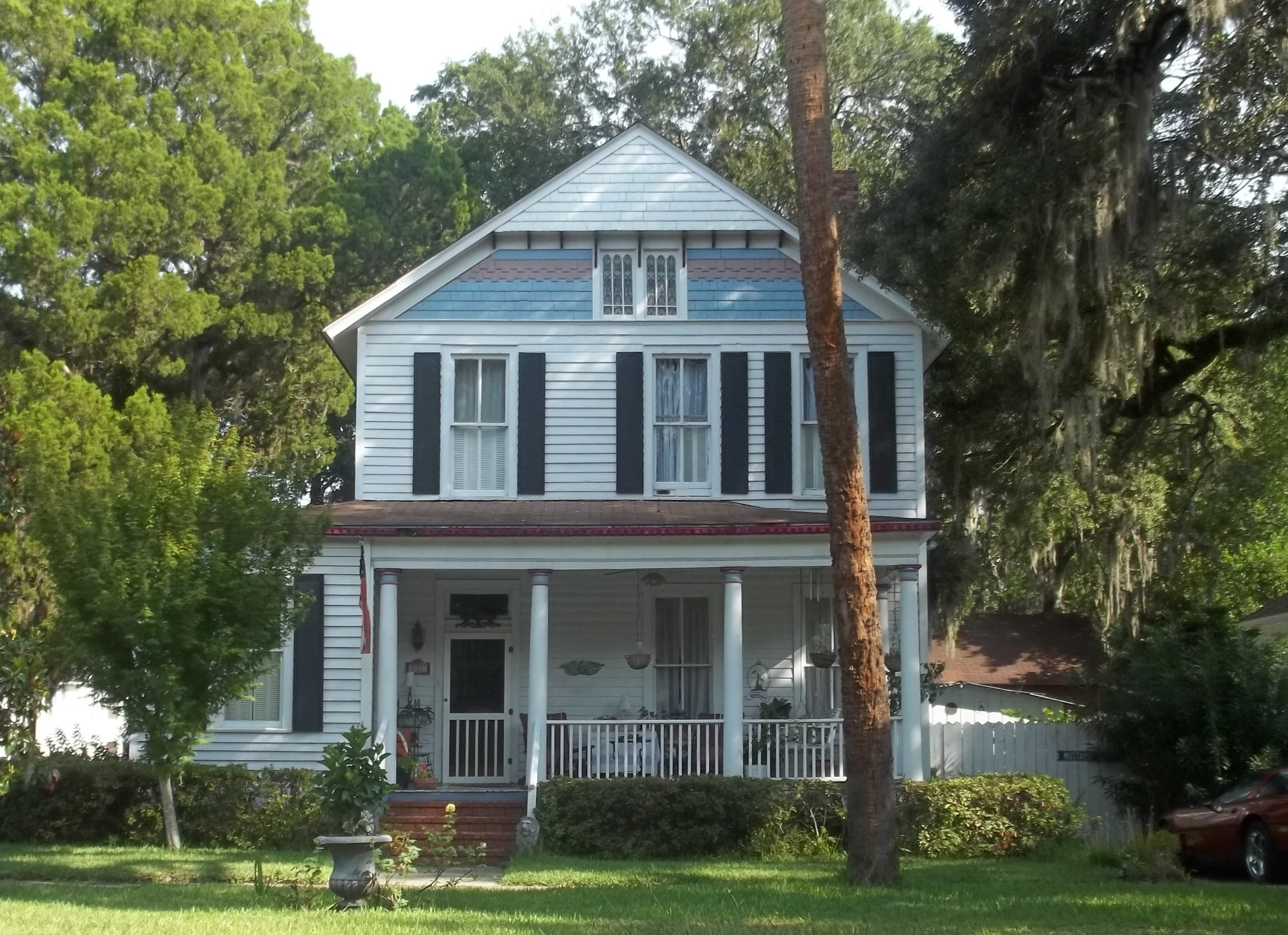
House in the Brunswick Old Town Historic District

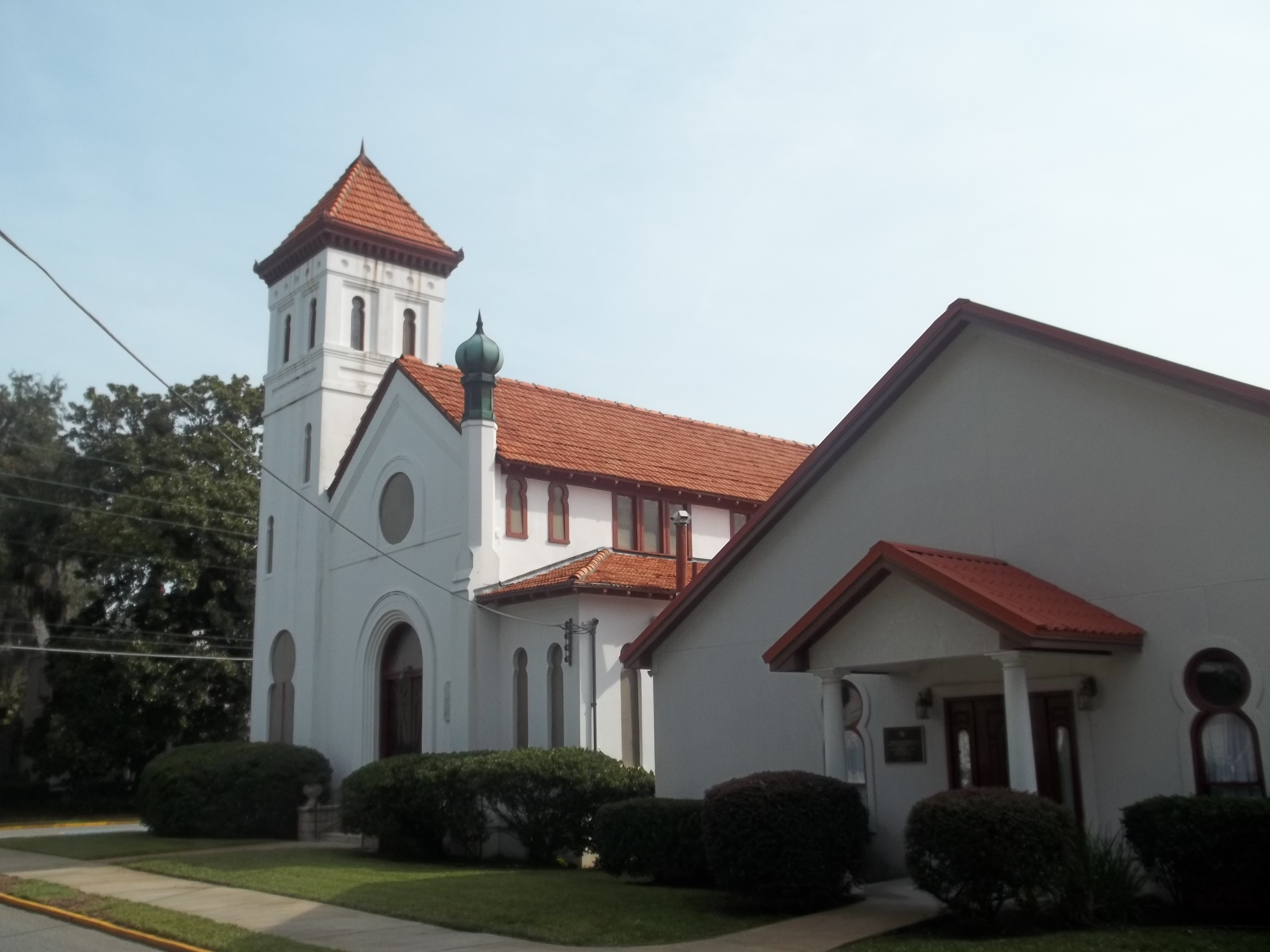
Temple Beth Tefilloh

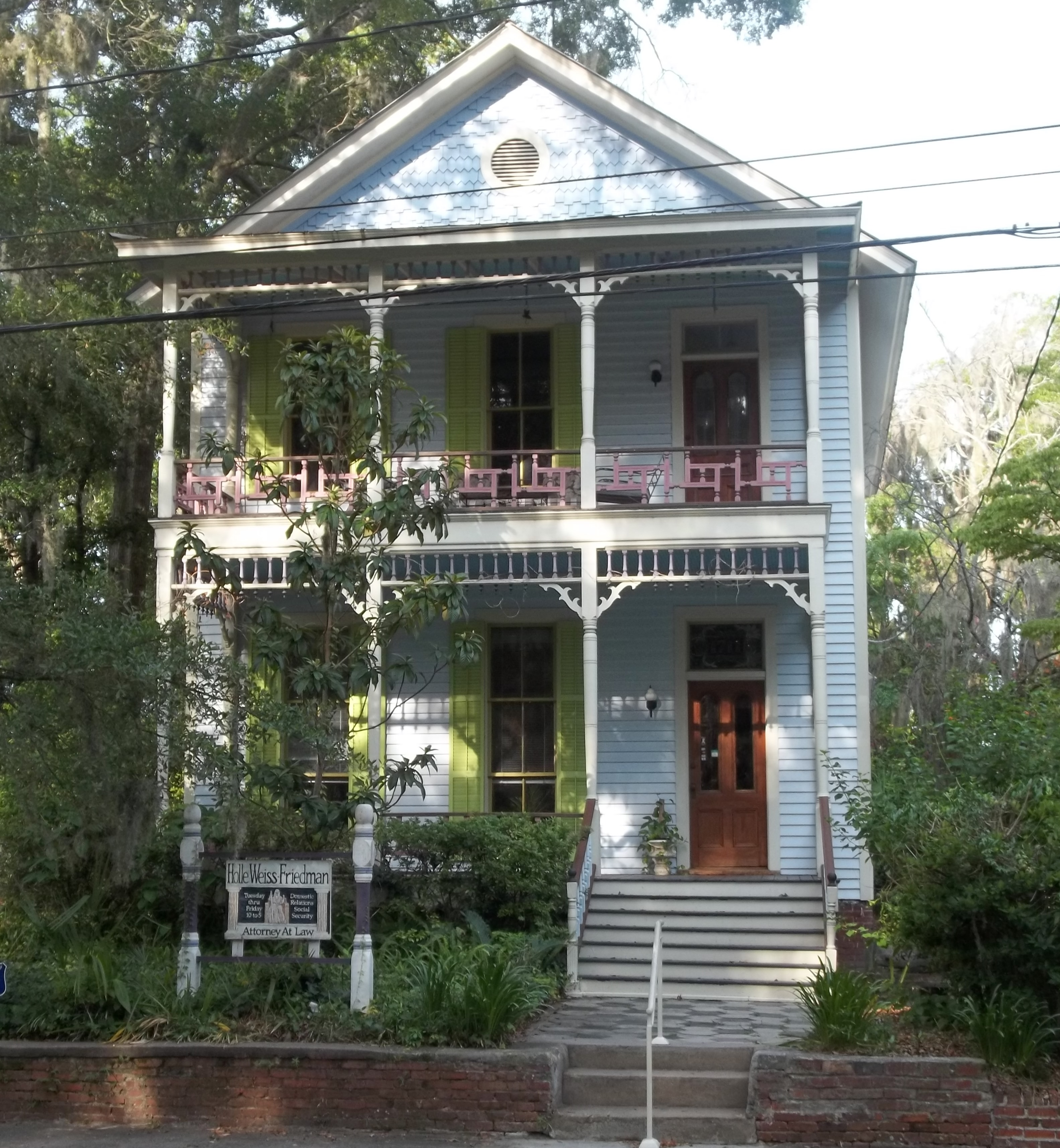
House in the Brunswick Old Town Historic District

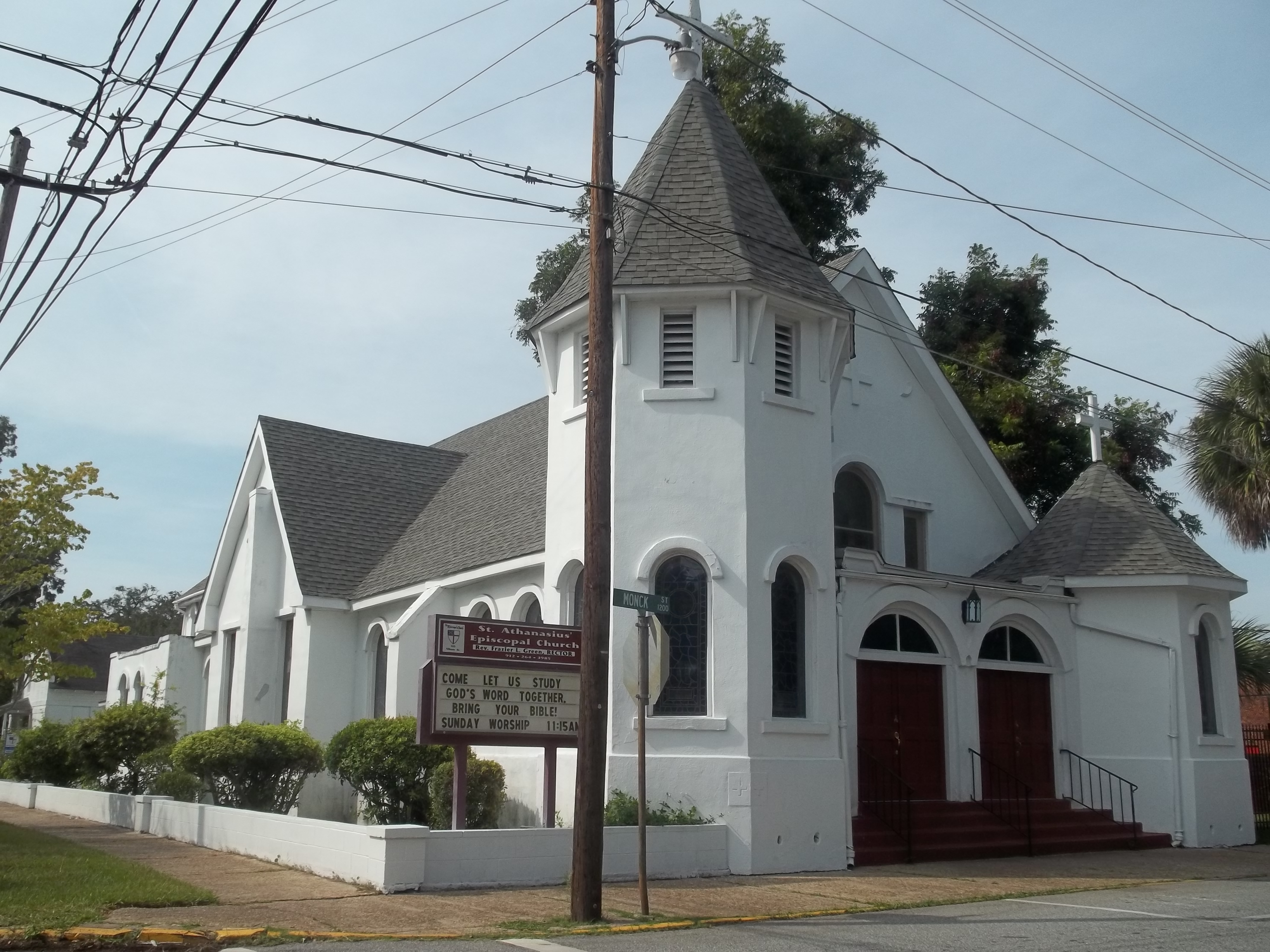
St. Athanasius Episcopal Church

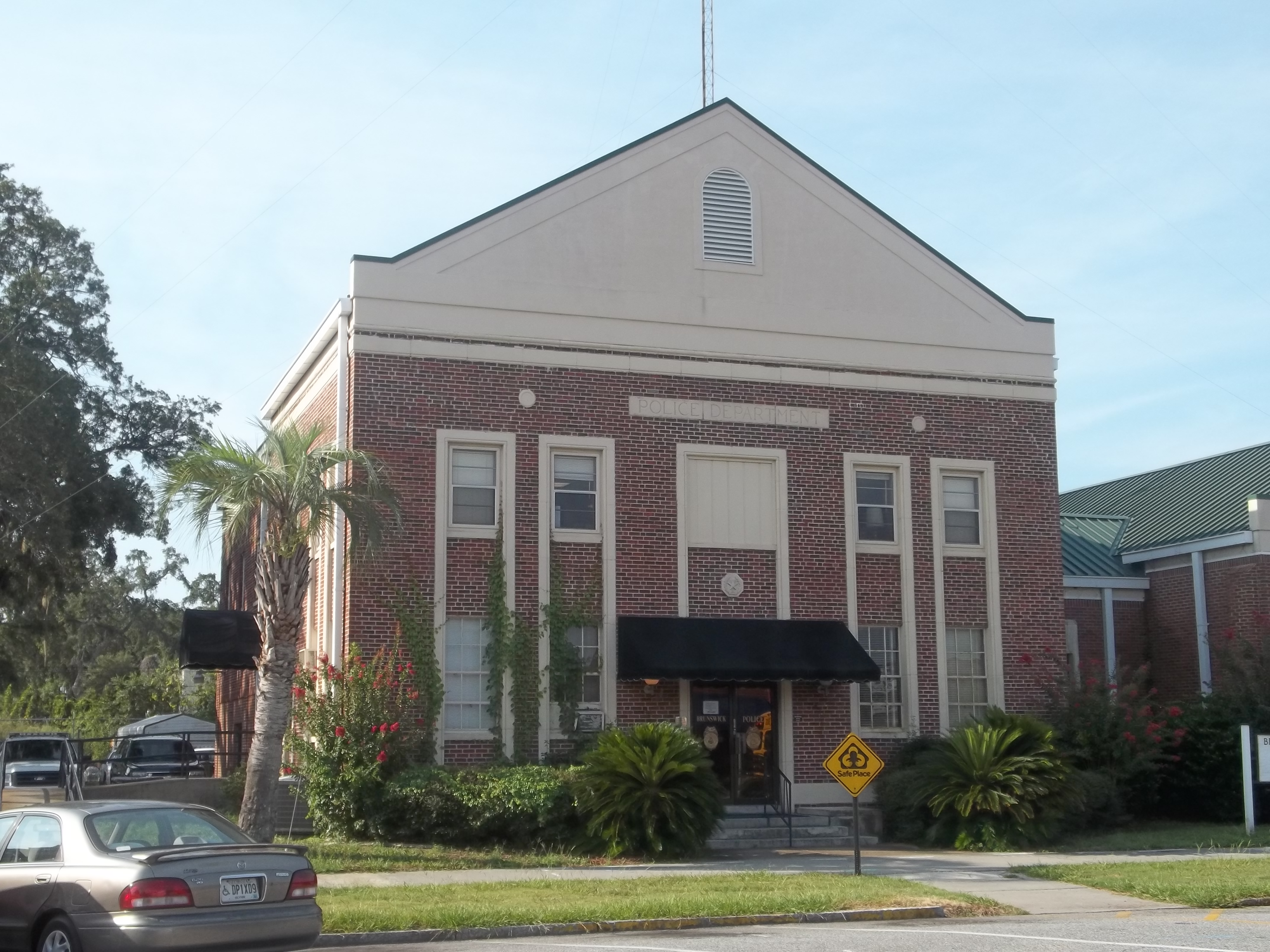
Police Department building

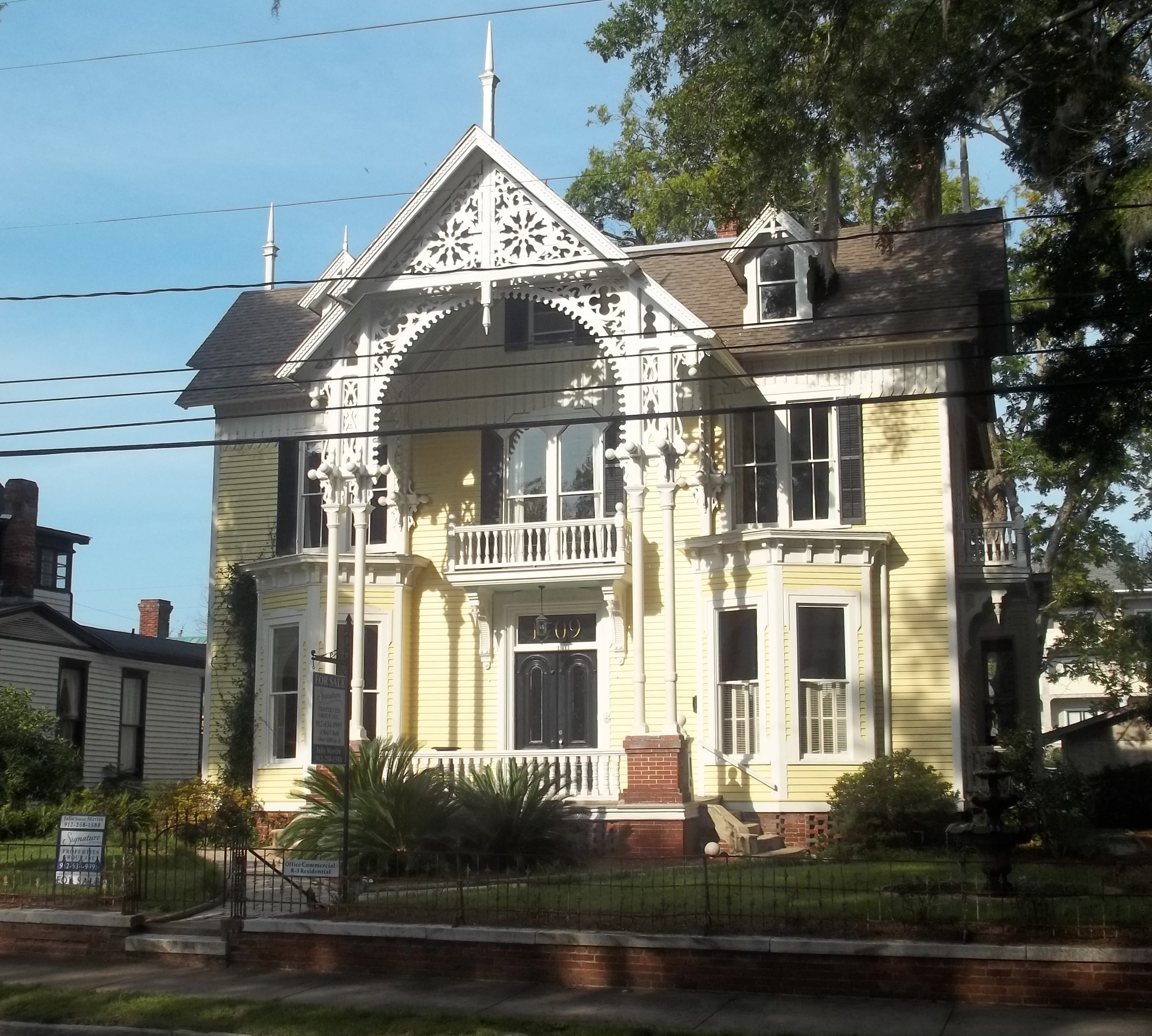
Mahoney-McGarvey House (1891)

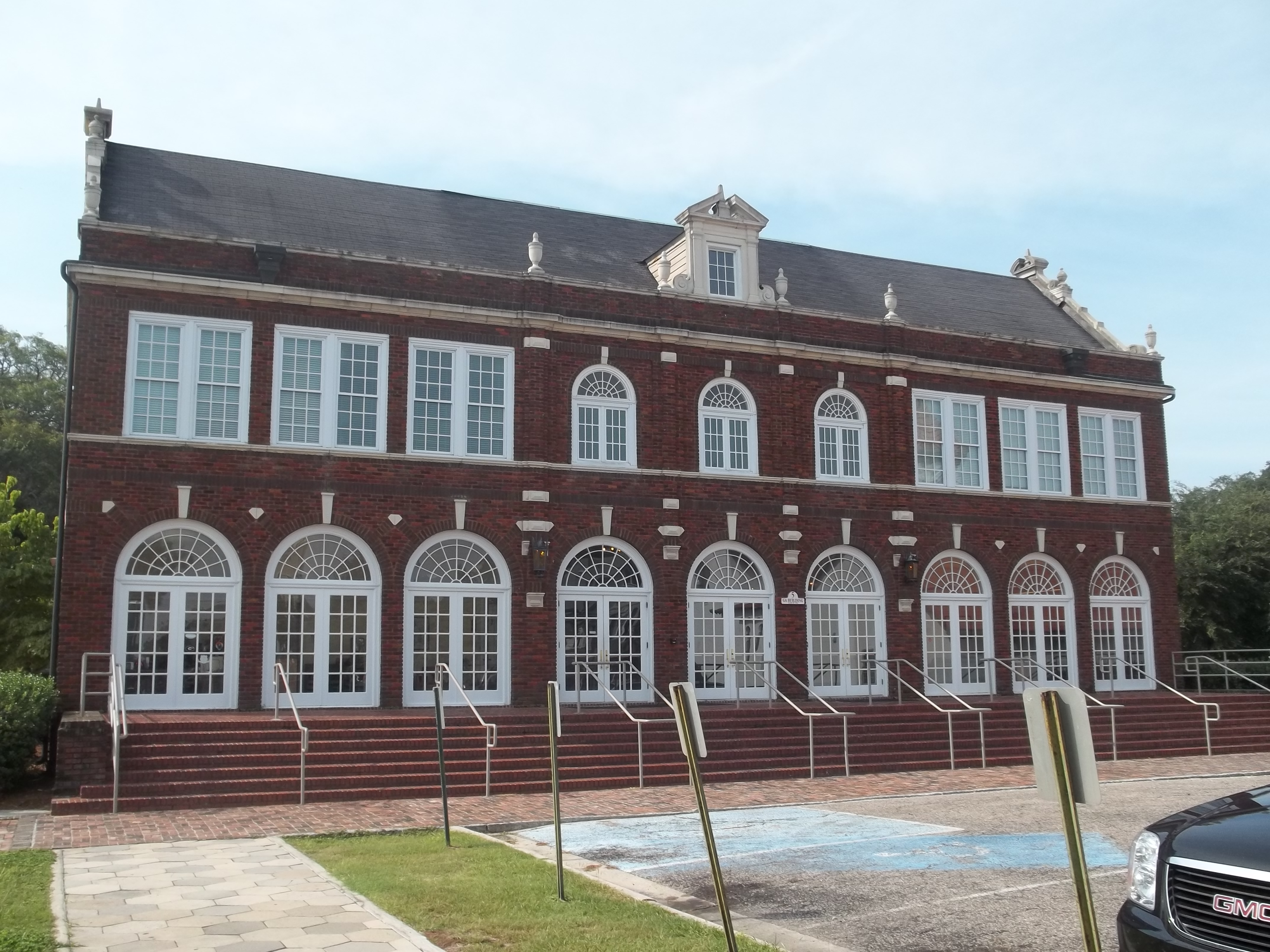
Glynn Academy (1922)

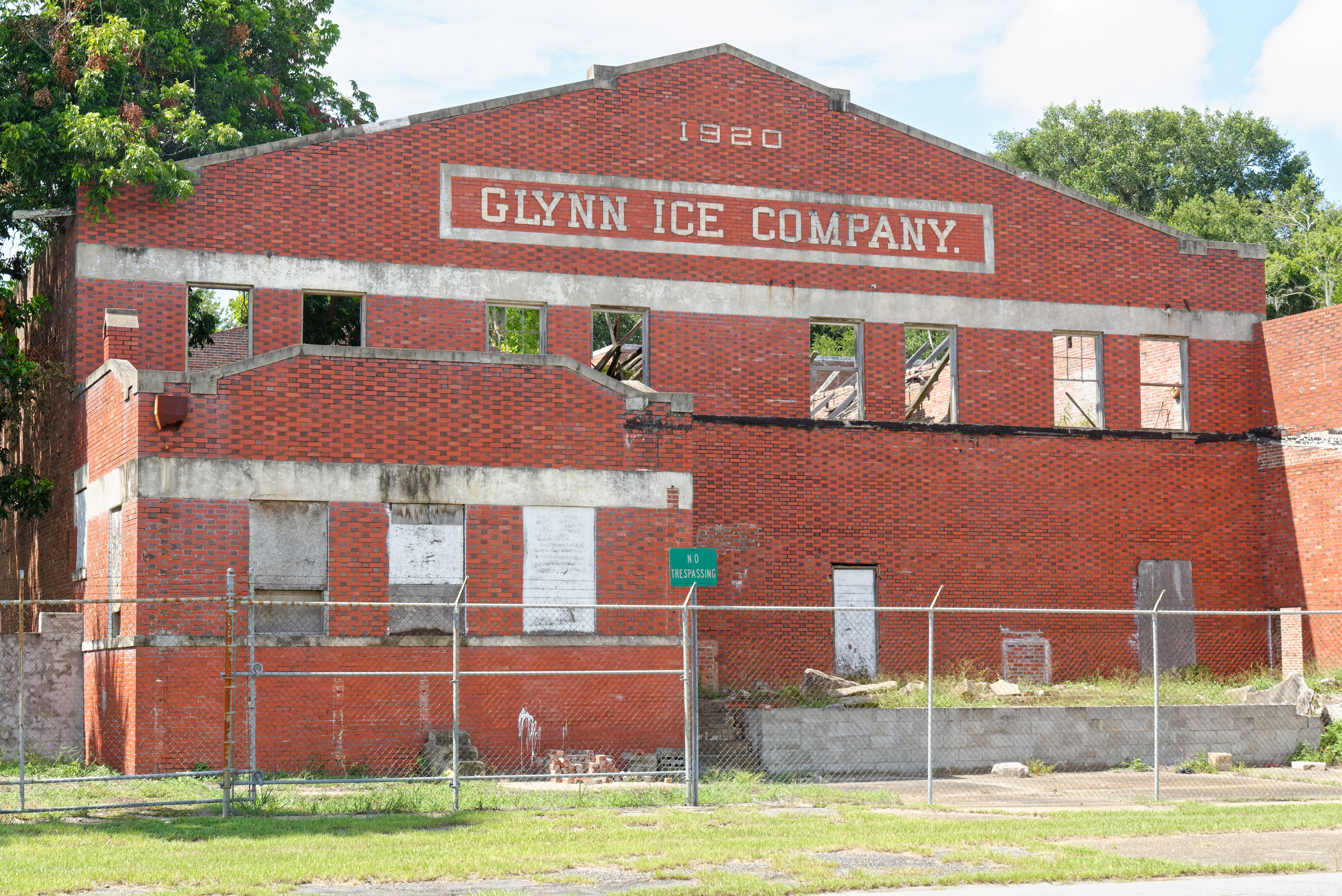
Glynn Ice Company (1920)

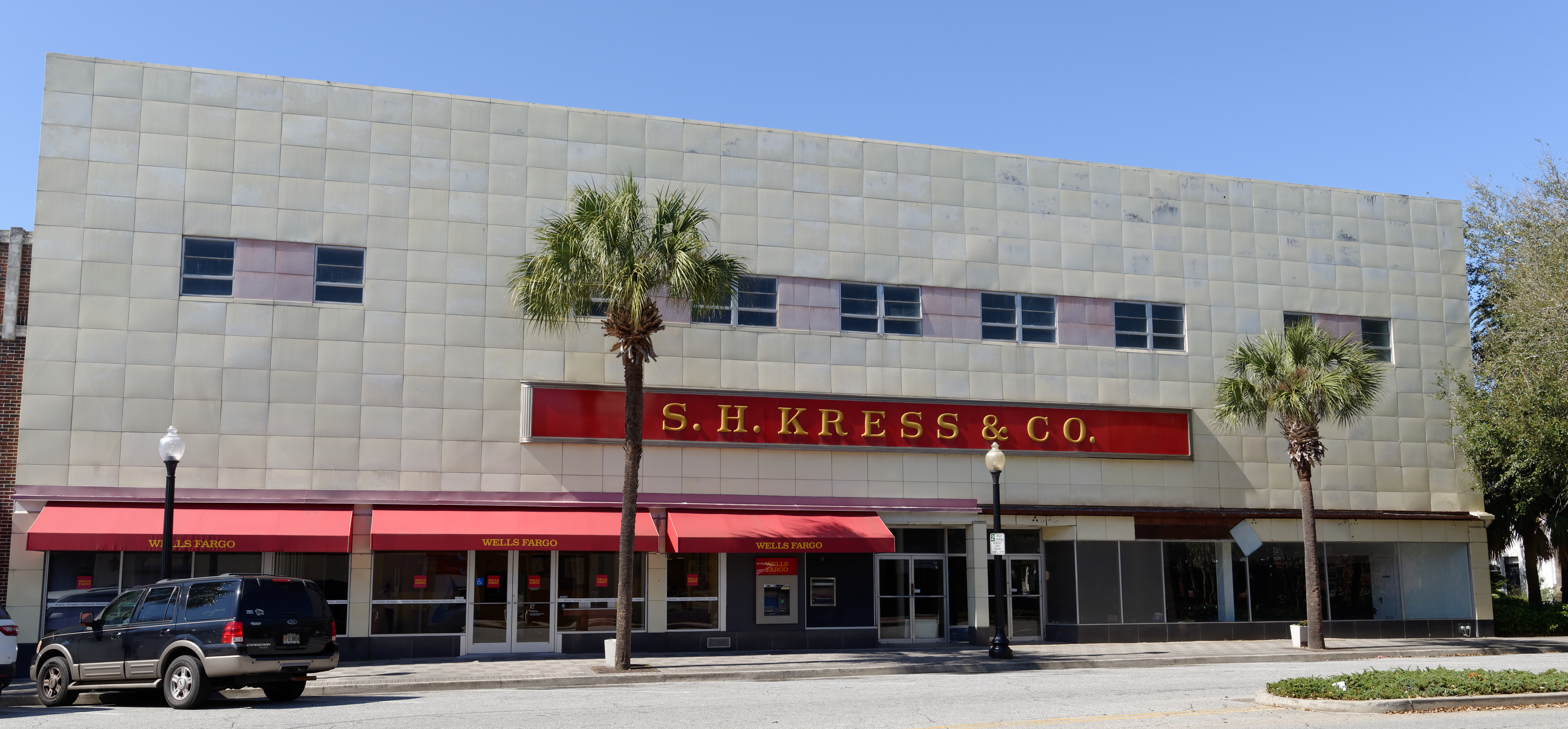
S. H. Kress & Co. store building, now under renovation as a mixed use facility

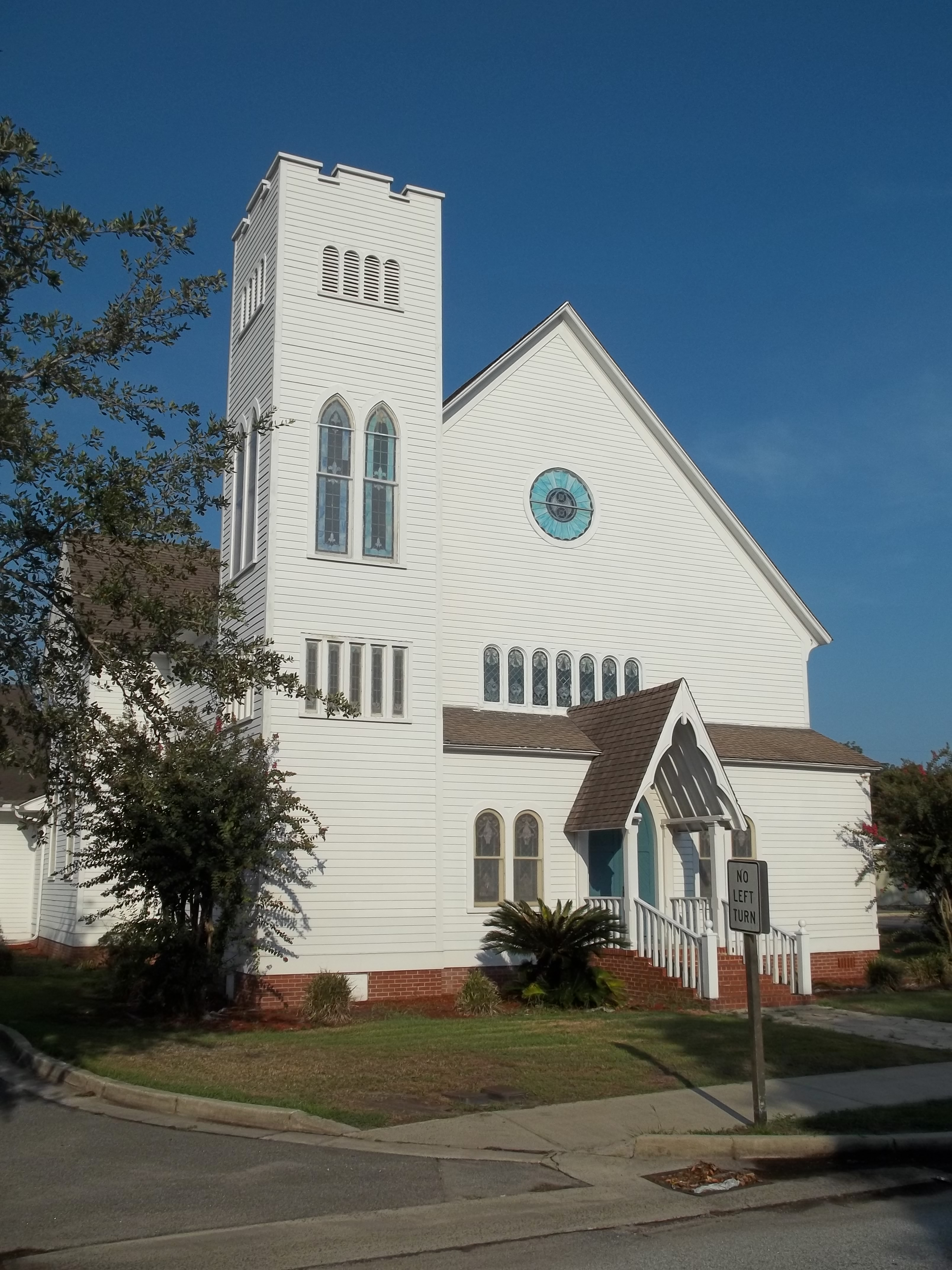
Advent Christian Church

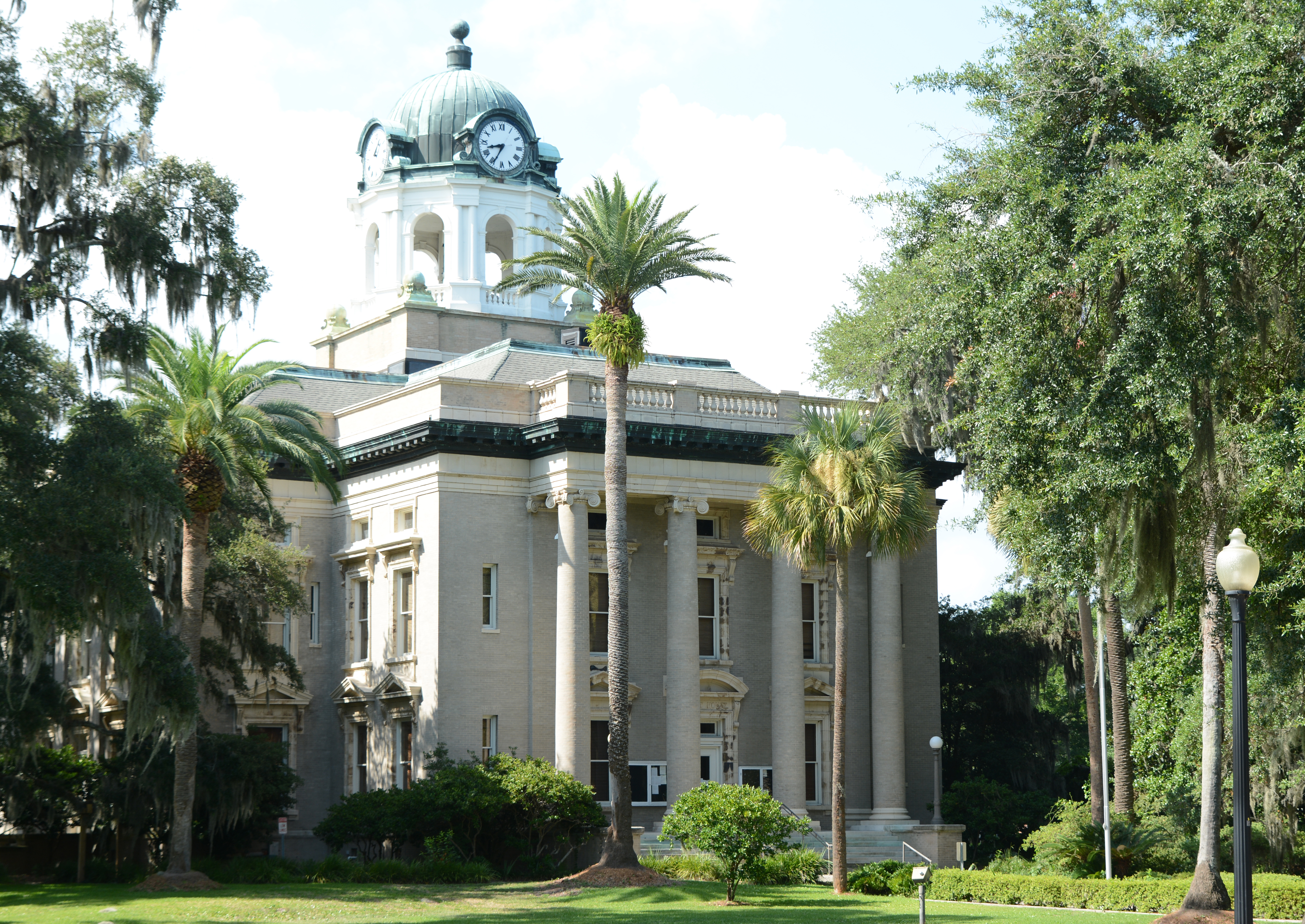
Historic Glynn County Courthouse (1907)

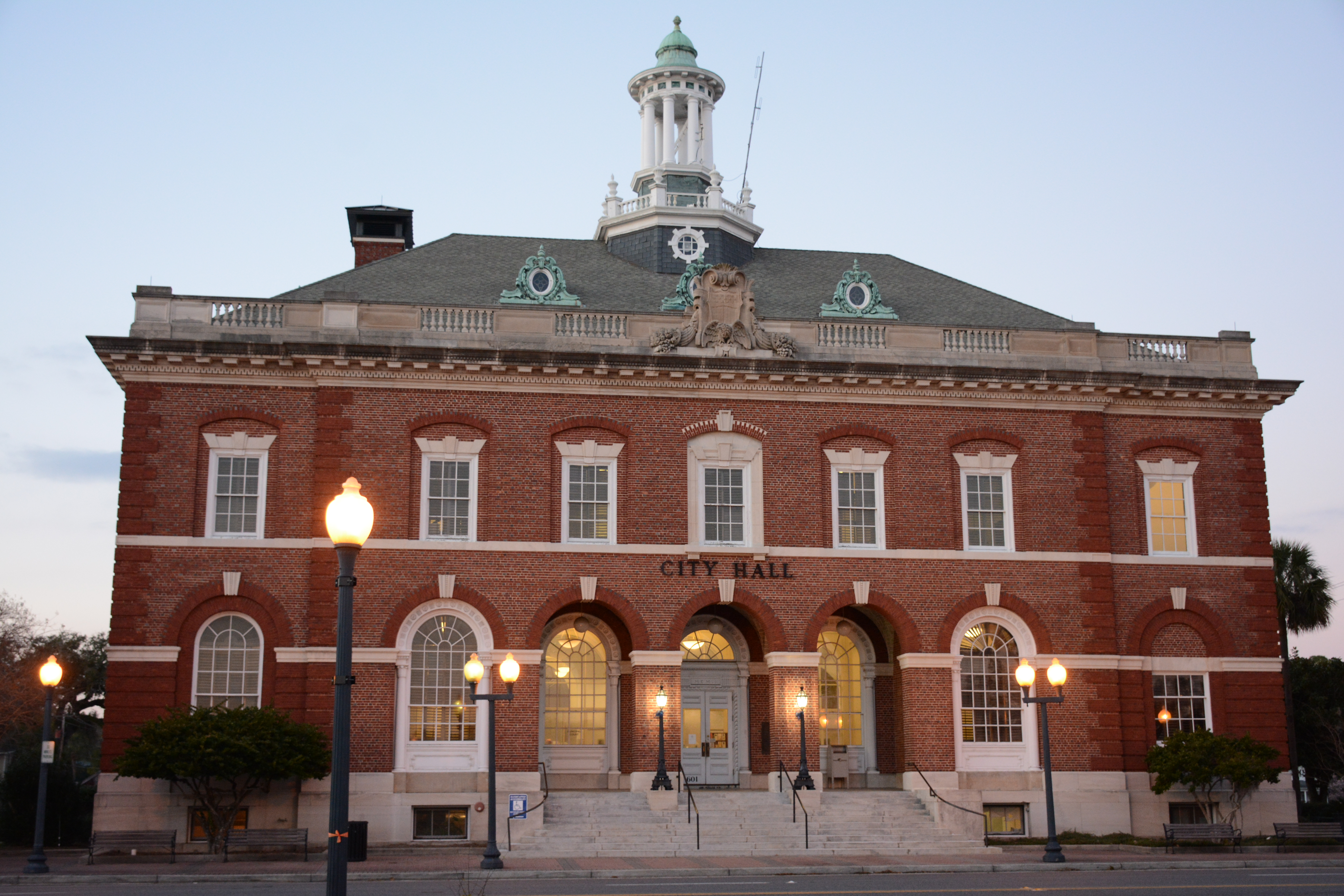
City Hall (1902), originally built as the U.S. Custom House and Post Office

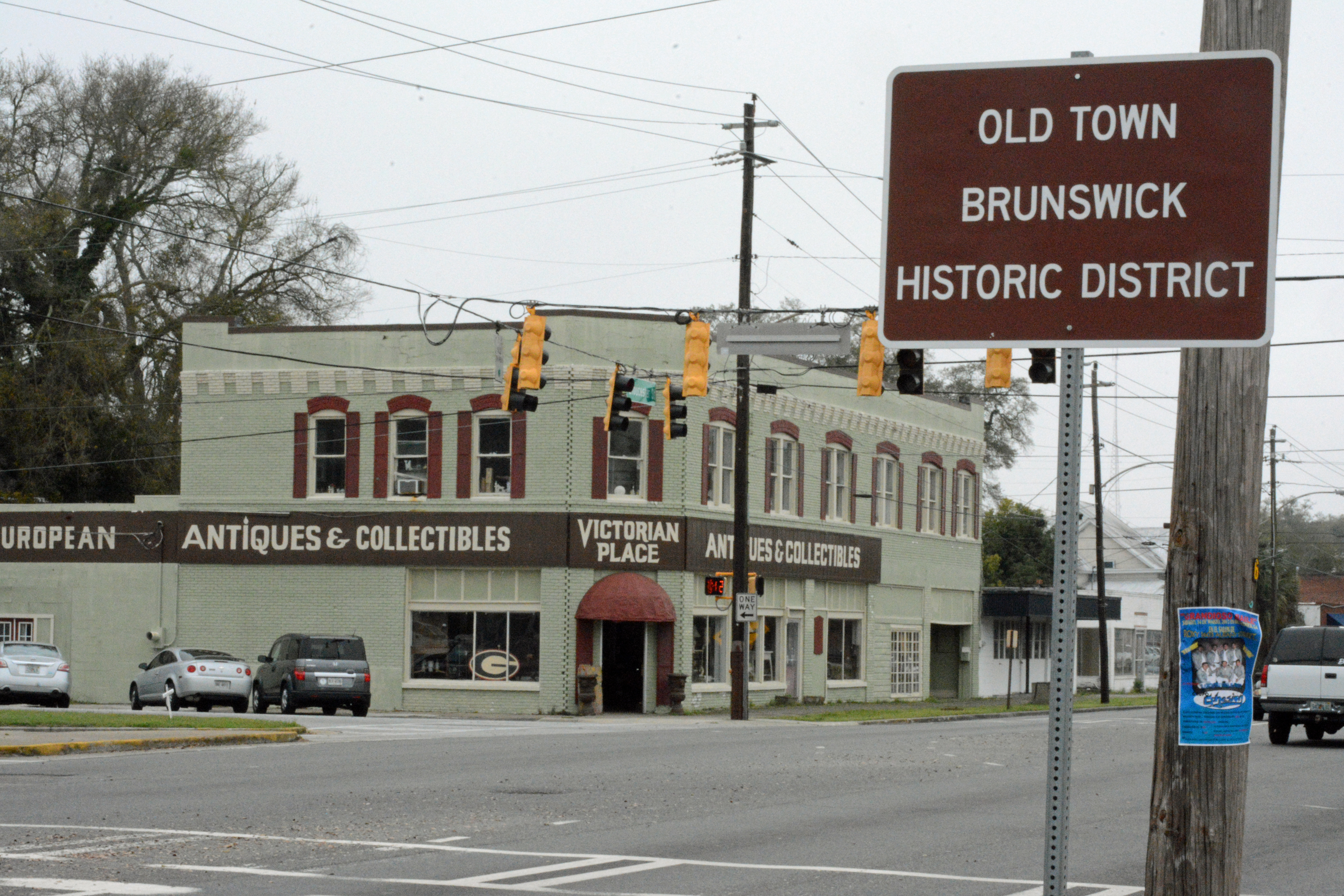
Sign marking the border of Old Town Historic District

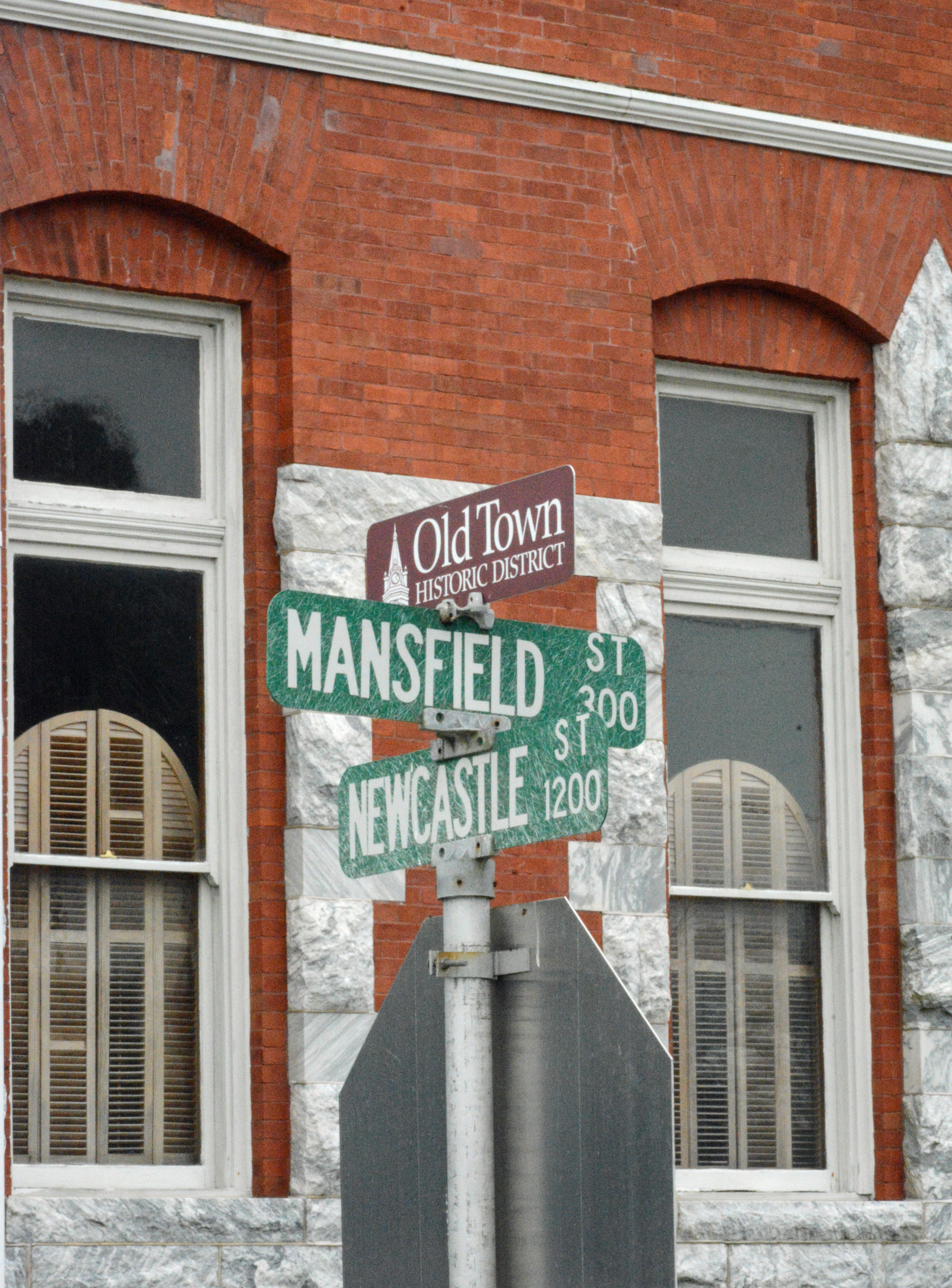
Street sign designating the Old Town Historic Area, the old city hall is in the background

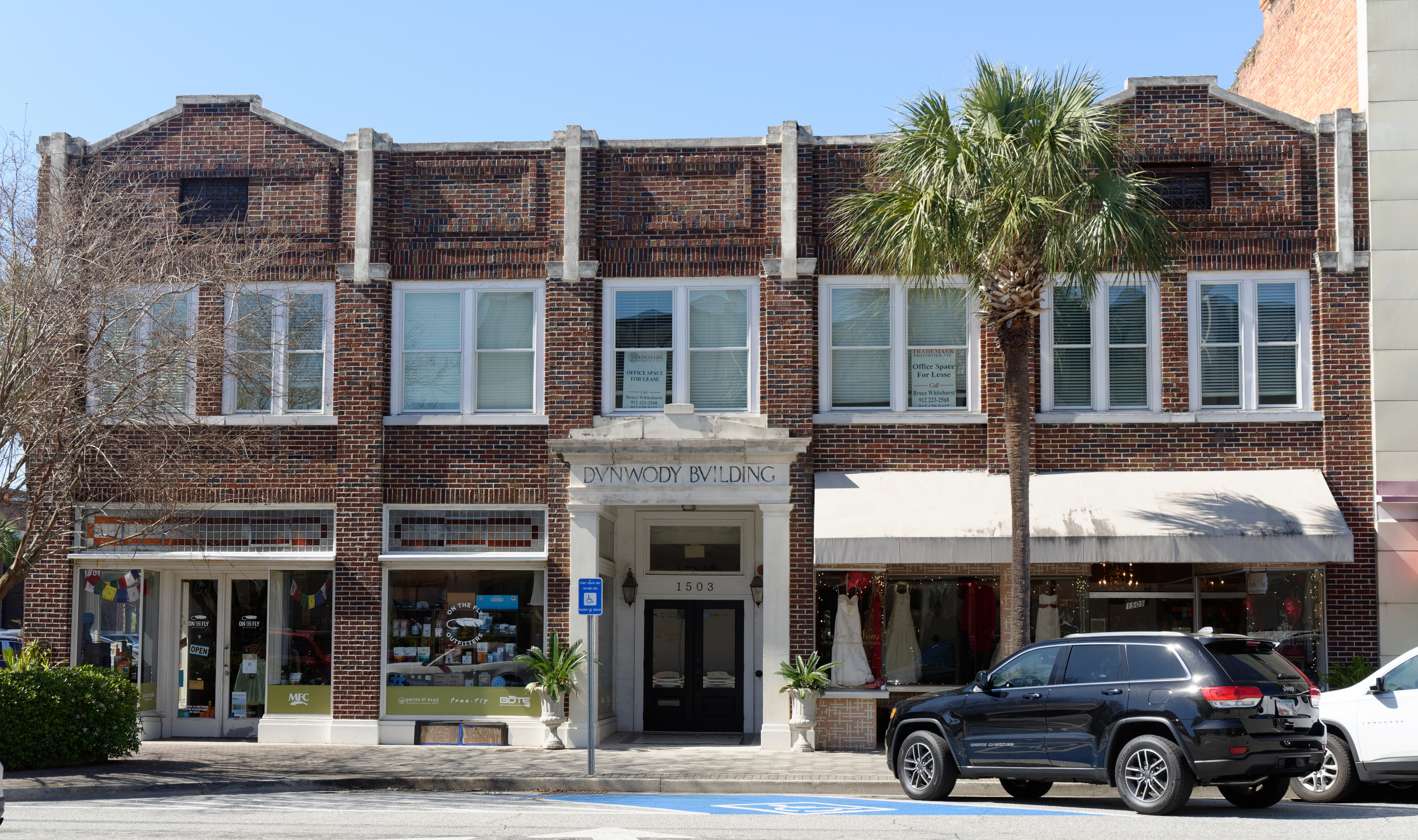
Dunwody Building

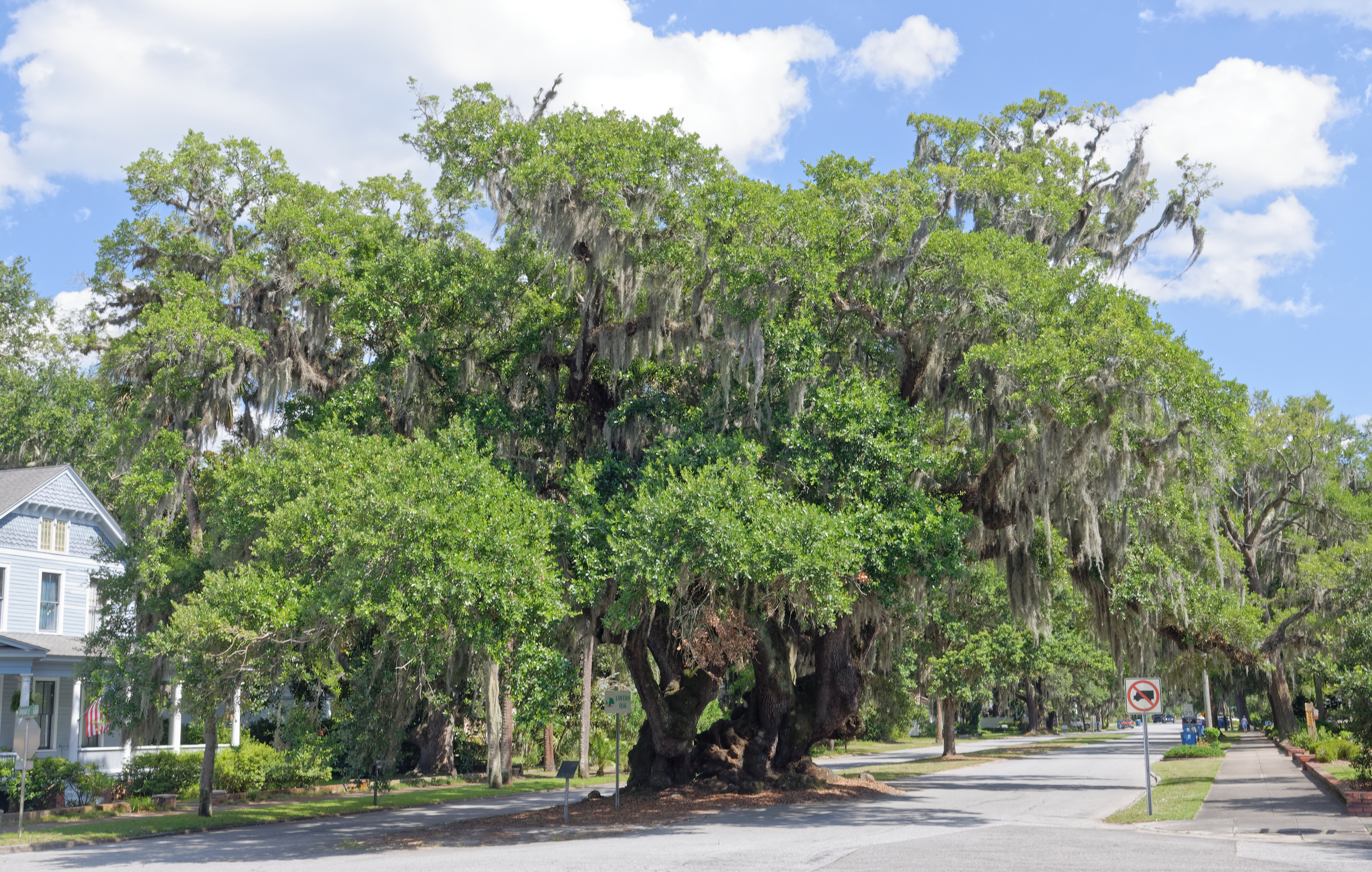
Lover's Oak

== See also ==
- National Register of Historic Places listings in Glynn County, Georgia
