= Matthew Zirkle =

Matthew A. Zirkle
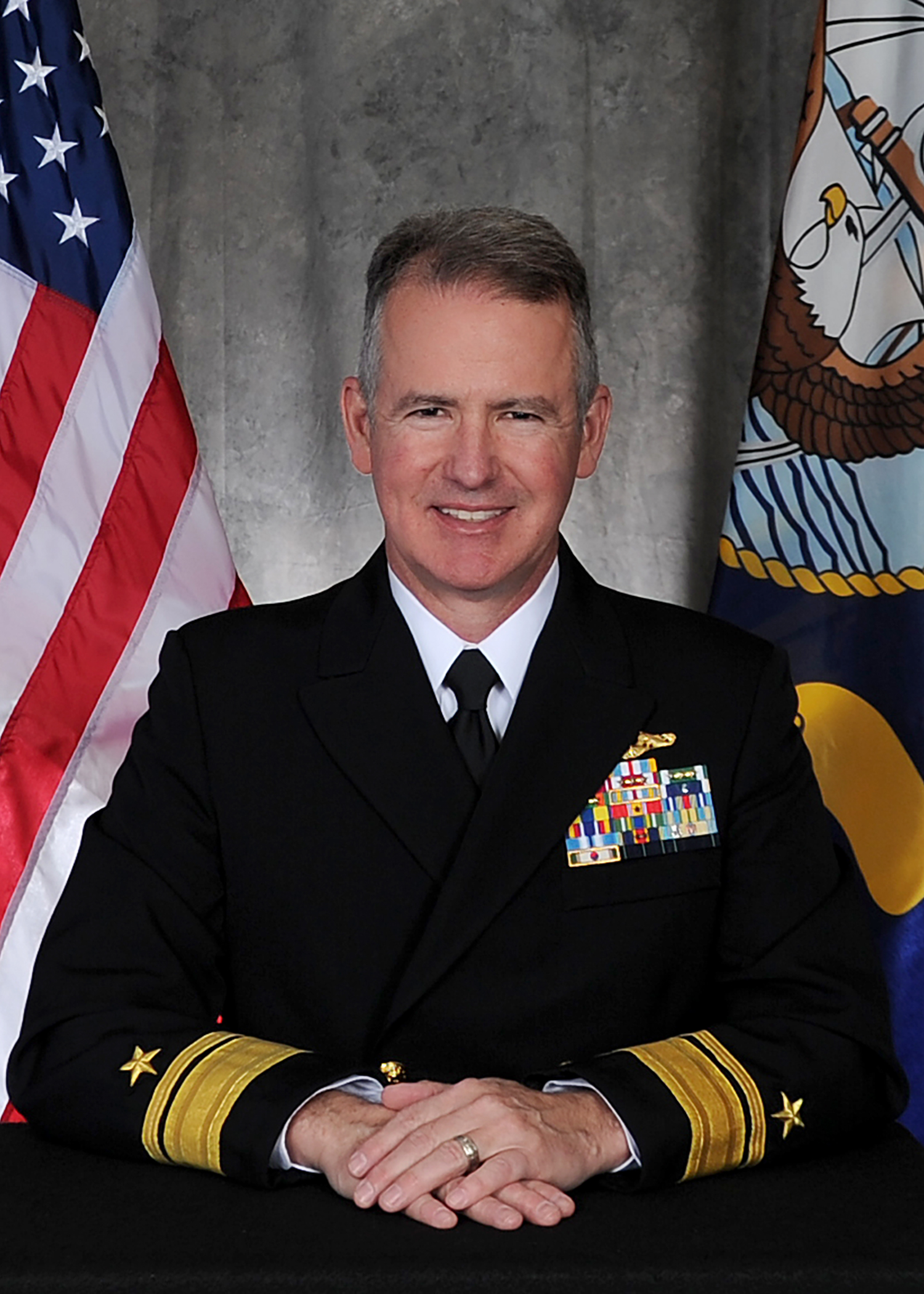
- Born: Matthew Alfred Zirkle
- Military career
- Branch: United States Navy
- Service years: 1984 – 2020
- Rank: Rear Admiral
- Nickname: Matt
- Awards: Defense Superior Service Medal (2), Legion of Merit (2), Meritorious Service Medal (4), Navy Commendation Medal (4), Navy Achievement Medal (4)

Matthew A. Zirkle was a Rear admiral with the United States Navy. He previously served as chief of staff for U.S. Naval Forces Europe, U.S. Navy Forces Africa and U.S. SIXTH Fleet.
