= Zirkle, Georgia =

Extinct town in Pierce County, Georgia

Coordinates: 31.361°N 82.041°W

Zirkle is an extinct town in Pierce County, in the U.S. state of Georgia.

== History ==
A post office called Zirkle was established in 1909, and remained in operation until 1926. Named for lumber baron L.A. Zirkle, the town died after sawmill production ended in 1926.

To find the remains of Zirkle today, look for the boat ramp sign posted on Highway 32 on the outskirts of Patterson, Georgia.
