= Bacon County School District =

School district in Georgia (U.S. state)

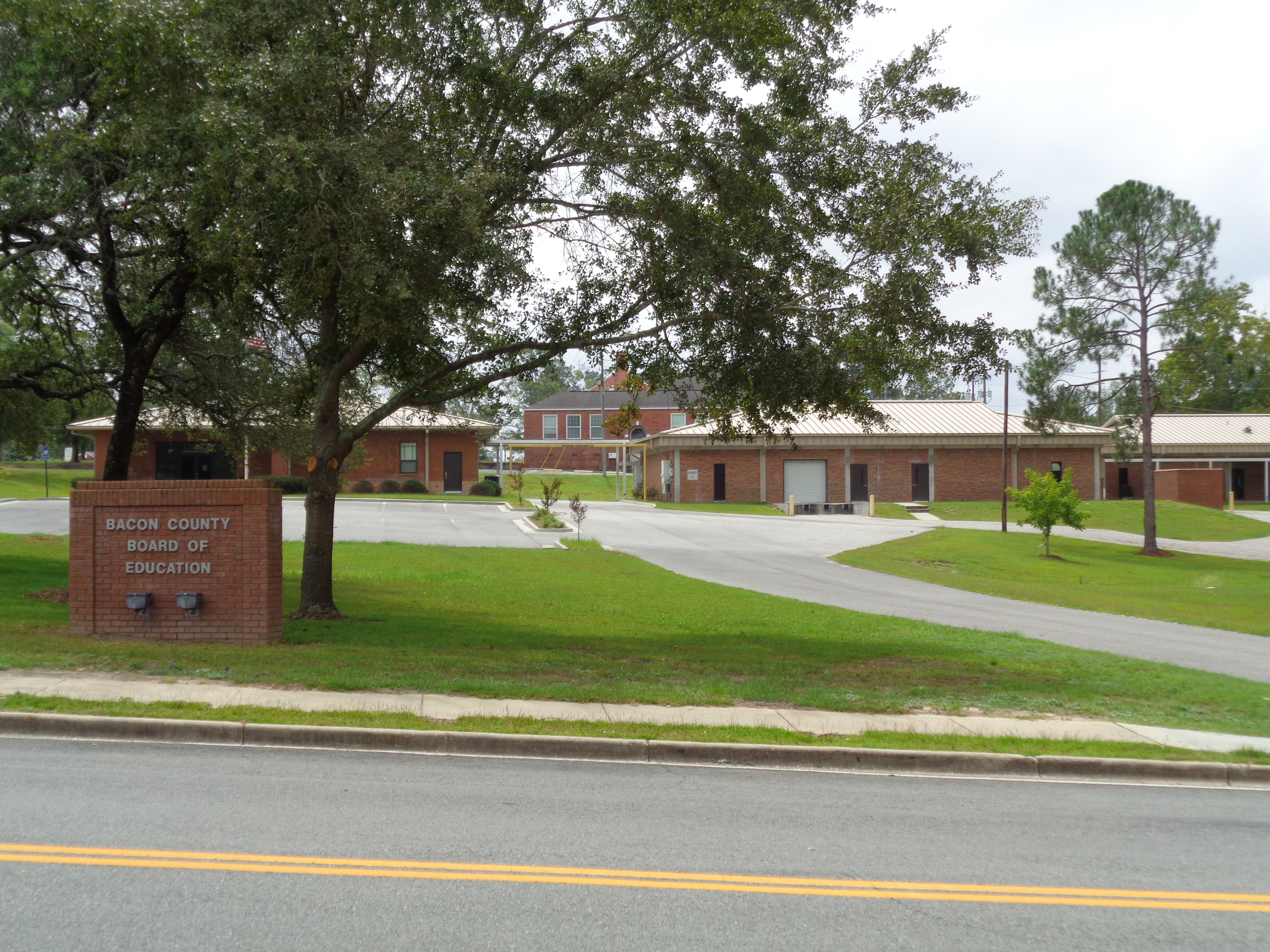

Address
- 102 West 4th Street Alma, Georgia, 31510-2228; United States
- Coordinates: 31.547185°N 82.461714°W

District information
- Grades: Pre-school - 12
- Superintendent: Traci Martin

Students and staff
- Enrollment: 1,900
- Faculty: 126

Other information
- Accreditation: Southern Association of Colleges and Schools; Georgia Accrediting Commission
- Website: www.bcraiders.com

The Bacon County School District is a public school district in Bacon County, Georgia, United States, based in Alma. It serves the communities of Alma and Rockingham.

== Schools ==
The Bacon County School District has one primary school, one elementary school, one middle school, and one high school. The district has 126 full-time teachers and over 1,900 students.

=== Elementary schools ===
- Bacon County Primary School (pre-school - grade 2)
- Bacon County Elementary School (grades 3 - 5)

=== Middle school ===
- Bacon County Middle School

=== High school ===
- Bacon County High School
