= Bacon County Elementary School =

- Bacon County School
- U.S. National Register of Historic Places
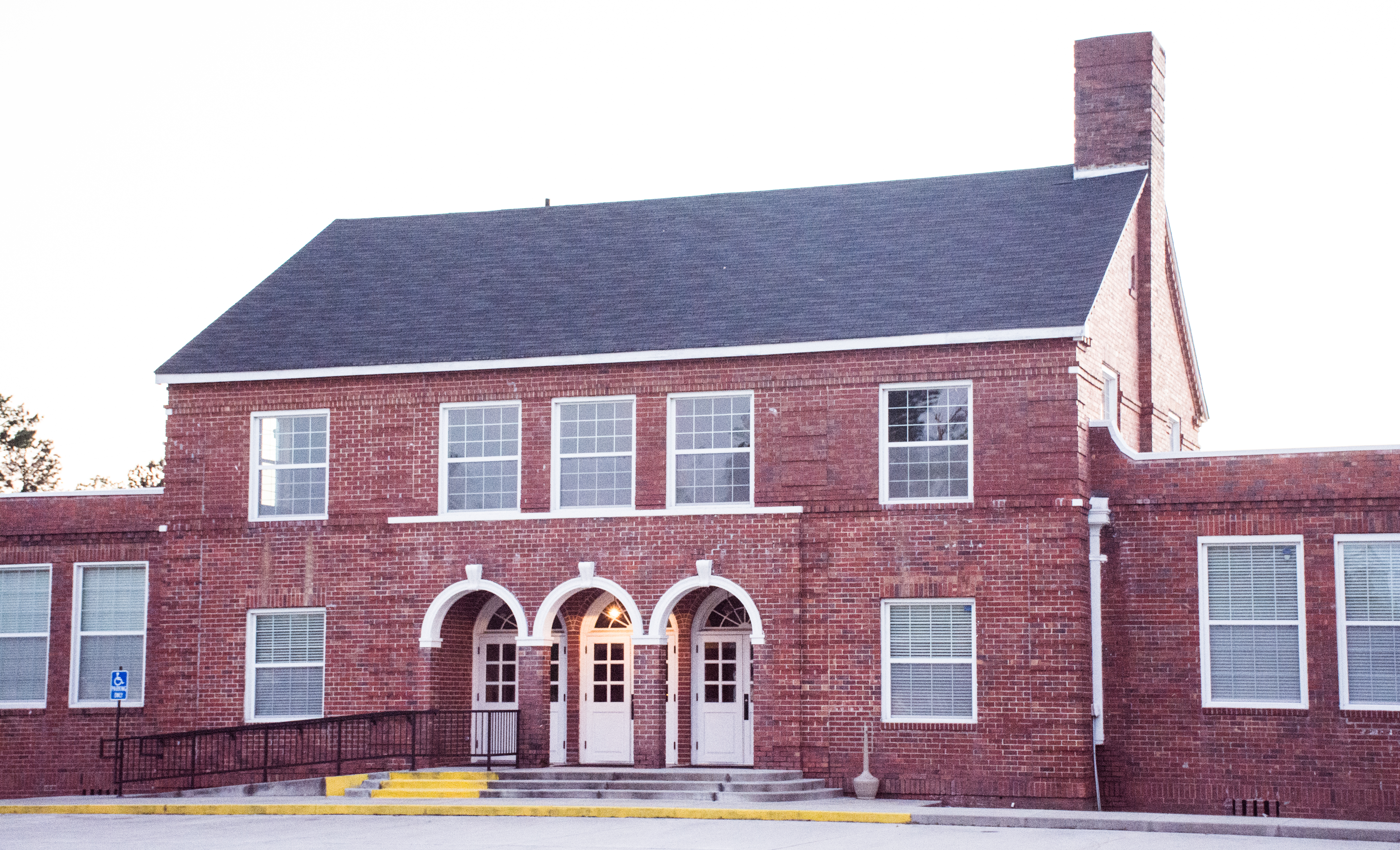

- Location within Georgia Location within the United States
- Location: 504 N Pierce St., Alma, Georgia
- Coordinates: 31°32′42″N 82°27′45″W
- Area: 3.4 acres (1.4 ha)
- Built: 1933
- Built by: Alexander Douglas
- Architectural style: Colonial Revival
- NRHP reference No.: 07001307
- Added to NRHP: December 26, 2007

The Bacon County Elementary School, also referred to as Bacon County School, is a historic school in Alma, Georgia, located at 504 North Pierce Street (US Highway 1). It was built by Alexander Douglas and was constructed in 1933-1934. It is in the Colonial Revival style. The school contains a two-story main block (containing offices) with a portico in the center with one-story wings for classrooms. There is a large auditorium in the rear.

A junior high school and high school were constructed on the site in the 1940s. A cafeteria was built in 1953 and two buildings for kindergarten and Head Start were built in 1969. The 1969 buildings remain, but are outside the National Register boundary. The 1940s and 1953 buildings were demolished in 2003. It was added to the National Register of Historic Places on December 26, 2007.

== See also ==
- Bacon County High School
- Bacon County School District
- National Register of Historic Places listings in Bacon County, Georgia
