= Georgia's 1st congressional district =

U.S. House district for Georgia

Coordinates: 31.1589°N 81.4892°W

- Interactive map of district boundaries since January 3, 2023
- Representative: Buddy Carter; R–St. Simons
- Distribution: 70.98% urban; 29.02% rural
- Population (2025): 821,482
- Median household income: $73,348
- Ethnicity: 57.6% White; 27.5% Black; 7.8% Hispanic; 4.1% Two or more races; 2.2% Asian; 0.8% other
- Cook PVI: R+8

Georgia's 1st congressional district is a congressional district in the U.S. state of Georgia. It is currently represented by Republican Buddy Carter. The district's boundaries were redrawn following the 2010 United States census, which granted an additional congressional seat to Georgia. The first election using the new district boundaries were the 2012 congressional elections.

The district comprises the entire coastal area of Sea Islands and much of the southeastern part of the state. In addition to Savannah, the district includes the cities of Brunswick, Jesup, and Waycross.

There are three military bases in the district:

- Kings Bay Naval Submarine Base, at Kings Bay in Camden County
- Fort Stewart, near Hinesville in Liberty County
- Hunter Army Airfield in Savannah

== Counties and communities ==
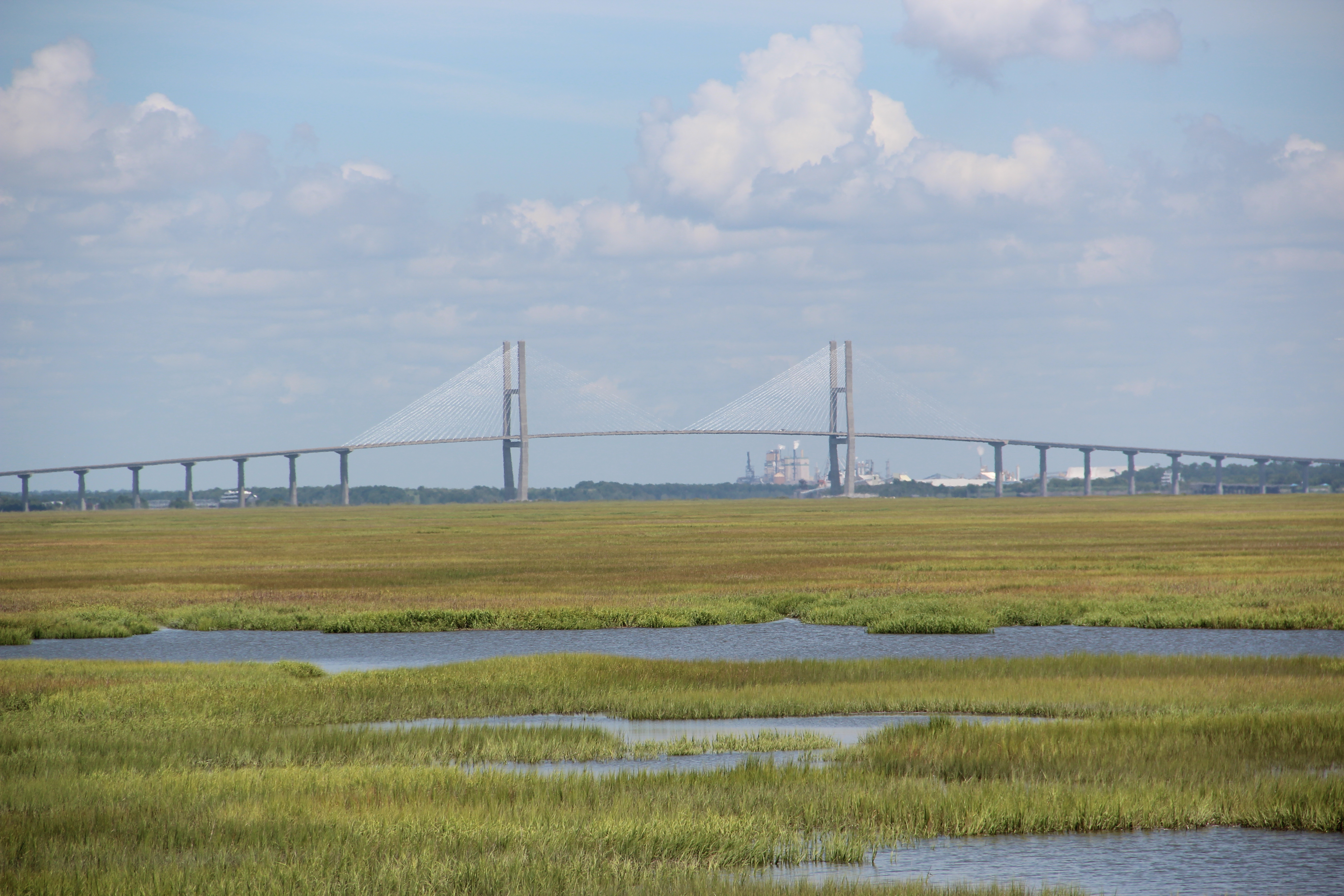
Much of the district is located along Georgia's marshy coast, such as this area in Glynn County containing the Sidney Lanier Bridge

For the 119th and successive Congresses (based on the districts drawn following a 2023 court order), the district contains all or portions of the following counties and communities.

Appling County (3)

All three communities

Bacon County (2)

Alma, Rockingham

Brantley County (5)

All five communities

Bryan County (3)

All three communities

Camden County (5)

All five communities

Charlton County (2)

Folkston, Homeland

Chatham County (18)

All 18 communities

Effingham County (3)

Guyton (part; also 12th), Rincon, Springfield (part; also 12th)

Glynn County (7)

All seven communities

Liberty County (8)

All eight communities

Long County (1)

Ludowici

McIntosh County (3)

All three communities

Pierce County (5)

All five communities

Ware County (7)

All seven communities

Wayne County (4)

All four communities

== Recent election results from statewide races ==
Year	Office	Results
2008	President	McCain 55% - 44%
2012	President	Romney 57% - 43%
2016	President	Trump 57% - 40%
2016	Senate	Isakson 60% - 36%
2018	Governor	Kemp 57% - 42%
2018	Lt. Governor	Duncan 58% - 42%
2018	Attorney General	Carr 58% - 42%
2020	President	Trump 56% - 43%
2021	Senate (Reg.)	Perdue 56% - 44%
2021	Senate (Spec.)	Loeffler 56% - 44%
2022	Senate	Walker 56% - 44%
2022	Governor	Kemp 60% - 39%
2022	Lt. Governor	Jones 58% - 39%
2022	Secretary of State	Raffensperger 60% - 37%
2022	Attorney General	Carr 59% - 40%
2024	President	Trump 58% - 42%

== List of members representing the district ==
Member	Party	Years	Cong ress	Electoral history	District location
District created March 4, 1789
James Jackson (Savannah)	Anti-Administration	March 4, 1789 – March 3, 1791	1st	Elected in 1789. Lost re-election.	1789–1791 "Lower district": Burke, Camden, Chatham, Effingham, Glynn, Greene, Liberty, Richmond, Washington, and Wilkes counties
Anthony Wayne (Richmond and Kew)	Anti-Administration	March 4, 1791 – March 21, 1792	2nd	Elected in 1791. Seat declared vacant due to dispute over validity of election result.	1791–1793 "Southern (or Eastern) district": Camden, Chatham, Effingham, Glynn, and Liberty counties
Vacant		March 21, 1792 – November 22, 1792	2nd		1791–1793 "Southern (or Eastern) district": Camden, Chatham, Effingham, Glynn, and Liberty counties
John Milledge (Augusta)	Anti-Administration	November 22, 1792 – March 3, 1793	2nd	Elected July 9, 1792 to finish Wayne's term and seated November 22, 1792. Redistricted to the at-large district.	1791–1793 "Southern (or Eastern) district": Camden, Chatham, Effingham, Glynn, and Liberty counties
District inactive		March 4, 1793 – March 3, 1827			
Edward Fenwick Tattnall (Savannah)	Jacksonian	March 4, 1827 – ????, 1827	20th	Redistricted from the at-large district and re-elected in 1826. Resigned before Congress convened.	1827–1829 [data missing]
Vacant		????, 1827 – October 1, 1827	20th		1827–1829 [data missing]
George Rockingham Gilmer (Lexington)	Jacksonian	October 1, 1827 – March 3, 1829	20th	Elected October 1, 1827 to finish Tattnall's term and seated December 3, 1827. Redistricted to the at-large district and although re-elected in 1828, failed to accept the position within the legal time frame and the governor ordered a new election.	1827–1829 [data missing]
District inactive		March 4, 1829 – March 3, 1845			
Thomas Butler King (Waynesville)	Whig	March 4, 1845 – March 4, 1850	29th 30th 31st	Elected in 1844. Re-elected in 1846. Re-elected in 1848. Resigned.	1845–1853 [data missing]
Joseph Webber Jackson (Savannah)	Democratic	March 4, 1850 – March 3, 1851	31st	Elected to finish King's term. Re-elected in 1851. [data missing]	1845–1853 [data missing]
Joseph Webber Jackson (Savannah)	Nullifier	March 4, 1851 – March 3, 1853	32nd	Elected to finish King's term. Re-elected in 1851. [data missing]	1845–1853 [data missing]
James Lindsay Seward (Thomasville)	Democratic	March 4, 1853 – March 3, 1859	33rd 34th 35th	Elected in 1853. Re-elected in 1855. Re-elected in 1857. [data missing]	1853–1861 [data missing]
Peter Early Love (Thomasville)	Democratic	March 4, 1859 – January 23, 1861	36th	Elected in 1859. Resigned.	1853–1861 [data missing]
Vacant		January 23, 1861 – July 25, 1868	36th 37th 38th 39th 40th	Civil War and Reconstruction	
Joseph W. Clift (Savannah)	Republican	July 25, 1868 – March 3, 1869	40th	Elected in 1868 to finish term. [data missing]	1868–1873 [data missing]
Vacant		March 4, 1869 – December 22, 1870	41st	Representative-elect Joseph W. Clift was not permitted to qualify.	1868–1873 [data missing]
William W. Paine (Savannah)	Democratic	December 22, 1870 – March 3, 1871	41st	Elected to finish Clift's term.	1868–1873 [data missing]
Archibald T. MacIntyre (Thomasville)	Democratic	March 4, 1871 – March 3, 1873	42nd	Elected in 1870. [data missing]	1868–1873 [data missing]
Morgan Rawls (Guyton)	Democratic	March 4, 1873 – March 24, 1874	43rd	Lost contested election.	1873–1883 [data missing]
Andrew Sloan (Savannah)	Republican	March 24, 1874 – March 3, 1875	43rd	Won contested election. [data missing]	1873–1883 [data missing]
Julian Hartridge (Savannah)	Democratic	March 4, 1875 – January 8, 1879	44th 45th	Elected in 1874. Re-elected in 1876. Elected in 1878. Died.	1873–1883 [data missing]
Vacant		January 8, 1879 – February 10, 1879	45th		1873–1883 [data missing]
William Bennett Fleming (Savannah)	Democratic	February 10, 1879 – March 3, 1879	45th	Elected January 23, 1879 to finish Hartridge's term. [data missing]	1873–1883 [data missing]
John C. Nicholls (Blackshear)	Democratic	March 4, 1879 – March 3, 1881	46th	Elected in 1878. [data missing]	1873–1883 [data missing]
George Robison Black (Sylvania)	Democratic	March 4, 1881 – March 3, 1883	47th	Elected in 1880. [data missing]	1873–1883 [data missing]
John C. Nicholls (Savannah)	Democratic	March 4, 1883 – March 3, 1885	48th	Elected in 1882. [data missing]	1883–1893 [data missing]
Thomas M. Norwood (Savannah)	Democratic	March 4, 1885 – March 3, 1889	49th 50th	Elected in 1884. Re-elected in 1886. [data missing]	1883–1893 [data missing]
Rufus E. Lester (Savannah)	Democratic	March 4, 1889 – June 16, 1906	51st 52nd 53rd 54th 55th 56th 57th 58th 59th	Elected in 1888. Re-elected in 1890. Re-elected in 1892. Re-elected in 1894. Re-elected in 1896. Re-elected in 1898. Re-elected in 1900. Re-elected in 1902. Re-elected in 1904. Died.	1883–1893 [data missing]
Rufus E. Lester (Savannah)	Democratic	March 4, 1889 – June 16, 1906	51st 52nd 53rd 54th 55th 56th 57th 58th 59th	Elected in 1888. Re-elected in 1890. Re-elected in 1892. Re-elected in 1894. Re-elected in 1896. Re-elected in 1898. Re-elected in 1900. Re-elected in 1902. Re-elected in 1904. Died.	1893–1903 [data missing]
Rufus E. Lester (Savannah)	Democratic	March 4, 1889 – June 16, 1906	51st 52nd 53rd 54th 55th 56th 57th 58th 59th	Elected in 1888. Re-elected in 1890. Re-elected in 1892. Re-elected in 1894. Re-elected in 1896. Re-elected in 1898. Re-elected in 1900. Re-elected in 1902. Re-elected in 1904. Died.	1903–1913 [data missing]
Vacant		June 16, 1906 – October 3, 1906	59th		1903–1913 [data missing]
James W. Overstreet (Sylvania)	Democratic	October 3, 1906 – March 3, 1907	59th	Elected to finish Lester's term. [data missing]	1903–1913 [data missing]
Charles Gordon Edwards (Savannah)	Democratic	March 4, 1907 – March 3, 1917	60th 61st 62nd 63rd 64th	Elected in 1906. Re-elected in 1908. Re-elected in 1910. Re-elected in 1912. Re-elected in 1914. Retired.	1903–1913 [data missing]
Charles Gordon Edwards (Savannah)	Democratic	March 4, 1907 – March 3, 1917	60th 61st 62nd 63rd 64th	Elected in 1906. Re-elected in 1908. Re-elected in 1910. Re-elected in 1912. Re-elected in 1914. Retired.	1913–1923 [data missing]
James W. Overstreet (Sylvania)	Democratic	March 4, 1917 – March 3, 1923	65th 66th 67th	Elected in 1916. Re-elected in 1918. Re-elected in 1920. Lost renomination.	1913–1923 [data missing]
Robert Lee Moore (Statesboro)	Democratic	March 4, 1923 – March 3, 1925	68th	Elected in 1922. Lost renomination.	1923–1933 [data missing]
Charles Gordon Edwards (Savannah)	Democratic	March 4, 1925 – July 13, 1931	69th 70th 71st 72nd	Elected in 1924. Re-elected in 1926. Re-elected in 1928. Re-elected in 1930. Died.	1923–1933 [data missing]
Vacant		July 13, 1931 – September 9, 1931	72nd		1923–1933 [data missing]
Homer C. Parker (Statesboro)	Democratic	September 9, 1931 – January 3, 1935	72nd 73rd	Elected to finish Edwards's term. Re-elected in 1932. Lost renomination.	1923–1933 [data missing]
Homer C. Parker (Statesboro)	Democratic	September 9, 1931 – January 3, 1935	72nd 73rd	Elected to finish Edwards's term. Re-elected in 1932. Lost renomination.	1933–1943 [data missing]
Hugh Peterson (Ailey)	Democratic	January 3, 1935 – January 3, 1947	74th 75th 76th 77th 78th 79th	Elected in 1934. Re-elected in 1936. Re-elected in 1938. Re-elected in 1940. Re-elected in 1942. Re-elected in 1944. Lost renomination.	1933–1943 [data missing]
Hugh Peterson (Ailey)	Democratic	January 3, 1935 – January 3, 1947	74th 75th 76th 77th 78th 79th	Elected in 1934. Re-elected in 1936. Re-elected in 1938. Re-elected in 1940. Re-elected in 1942. Re-elected in 1944. Lost renomination.	1943–1953 [data missing]
Prince Hulon Preston Jr. (Statesboro)	Democratic	January 3, 1947 – January 3, 1961	80th 81st 82nd 83rd 84th 85th 86th	Elected in 1946. Re-elected in 1948. Re-elected in 1950. Re-elected in 1952. Re-elected in 1954. Re-elected in 1956. Re-elected in 1958. Lost renomination.	1943–1953 [data missing]
Prince Hulon Preston Jr. (Statesboro)	Democratic	January 3, 1947 – January 3, 1961	80th 81st 82nd 83rd 84th 85th 86th	Elected in 1946. Re-elected in 1948. Re-elected in 1950. Re-elected in 1952. Re-elected in 1954. Re-elected in 1956. Re-elected in 1958. Lost renomination.	1953–1963 [data missing]
George Elliott Hagan (Sylvania)	Democratic	January 3, 1961 – January 3, 1973	87th 88th 89th 90th 91st 92nd	Elected in 1960. Re-elected in 1962. Re-elected in 1964. Re-elected in 1966. Re-elected in 1968. Re-elected in 1970. Lost renomination.	1953–1963 [data missing]
George Elliott Hagan (Sylvania)	Democratic	January 3, 1961 – January 3, 1973	87th 88th 89th 90th 91st 92nd	Elected in 1960. Re-elected in 1962. Re-elected in 1964. Re-elected in 1966. Re-elected in 1968. Re-elected in 1970. Lost renomination.	1963–1973 [data missing]
Ronald 'Bo' Ginn (Millen)	Democratic	January 3, 1973 – January 3, 1983	93rd 94th 95th 96th 97th	Elected in 1972. Re-elected in 1974. Re-elected in 1976. Re-elected in 1978. Re-elected in 1980. Retired to run for Governor of Georgia.	1973–1983 [data missing]
Lindsay Thomas (Statesboro)	Democratic	January 3, 1983 – January 3, 1993	98th 99th 100th 101st 102nd	Elected in 1982. Re-elected in 1984. Re-elected in 1986. Re-elected in 1988. Re-elected in 1990. Retired.	1983–1993 [data missing]
Jack Kingston (Savannah)	Republican	January 3, 1993 – January 3, 2015	103rd 104th 105th 106th 107th 108th 109th 110th 111th 112th 113th	Elected in 1992. Re-elected in 1994. Re-elected in 1996. Re-elected in 1998. Re-elected in 2000. Re-elected in 2002. Re-elected in 2004. Re-elected in 2006. Re-elected in 2008. Re-elected in 2010. Re-elected in 2012. Retired to run for U.S. Senator.	1993–2003 [data missing]
Jack Kingston (Savannah)	Republican	January 3, 1993 – January 3, 2015	103rd 104th 105th 106th 107th 108th 109th 110th 111th 112th 113th	Elected in 1992. Re-elected in 1994. Re-elected in 1996. Re-elected in 1998. Re-elected in 2000. Re-elected in 2002. Re-elected in 2004. Re-elected in 2006. Re-elected in 2008. Re-elected in 2010. Re-elected in 2012. Retired to run for U.S. Senator.	2003–2007
Jack Kingston (Savannah)	Republican	January 3, 1993 – January 3, 2015	103rd 104th 105th 106th 107th 108th 109th 110th 111th 112th 113th	Elected in 1992. Re-elected in 1994. Re-elected in 1996. Re-elected in 1998. Re-elected in 2000. Re-elected in 2002. Re-elected in 2004. Re-elected in 2006. Re-elected in 2008. Re-elected in 2010. Re-elected in 2012. Retired to run for U.S. Senator.	2007–2013
Jack Kingston (Savannah)	Republican	January 3, 1993 – January 3, 2015	103rd 104th 105th 106th 107th 108th 109th 110th 111th 112th 113th	Elected in 1992. Re-elected in 1994. Re-elected in 1996. Re-elected in 1998. Re-elected in 2000. Re-elected in 2002. Re-elected in 2004. Re-elected in 2006. Re-elected in 2008. Re-elected in 2010. Re-elected in 2012. Retired to run for U.S. Senator.	2013–2023
Buddy Carter (St. Simons)	Republican	January 3, 2015 – present	114th 115th 116th 117th 118th 119th	Elected in 2014. Re-elected in 2016. Re-elected in 2018. Re-elected in 2020. Re-elected in 2022. Re-elected in 2024. Retired to run for U.S Senate.	2013–2023
Buddy Carter (St. Simons)	Republican	January 3, 2015 – present	114th 115th 116th 117th 118th 119th	Elected in 2014. Re-elected in 2016. Re-elected in 2018. Re-elected in 2020. Re-elected in 2022. Re-elected in 2024. Retired to run for U.S Senate.	2023–2025
Buddy Carter (St. Simons)	Republican	January 3, 2015 – present	114th 115th 116th 117th 118th 119th	Elected in 2014. Re-elected in 2016. Re-elected in 2018. Re-elected in 2020. Re-elected in 2022. Re-elected in 2024. Retired to run for U.S Senate.	2025–present
Jim Kingston (Savannah)	Republican	Assuming office on January 3, 2027		Elected in 2026.	2025–present

== Recent election results ==
=== 2002 ===
Georgia's 1st Congressional District Election (2002)
Party	Candidate	Votes	%
Republican	Jack Kingston (Incumbent)	103,661	72.14
Democratic	Don Smart	40,026	27.85
No party	Others	13	0.01
Total votes		143,700	100.00
Turnout			
Republican hold			

=== 2004 ===
Georgia's 1st Congressional District Election (2004)
Party	Candidate	Votes	%
Republican	Jack Kingston (Incumbent)	188,347	100.00
Total votes		188,347	100.00
Turnout			
Republican hold			

=== 2006 ===
Georgia's 1st Congressional District Election (2006)
Party	Candidate	Votes	%
Republican	Jack Kingston (Incumbent)	94,961	68.50
Democratic	Jim Nelson	43,668	31.50
Total votes		138,629	100.00
Turnout			
Republican hold			

=== 2008 ===
Georgia's 1st Congressional District Election (2008)
Party	Candidate	Votes	%
Republican	Jack Kingston (Incumbent)	165,911	66.53
Democratic	Bill Gillespie	83,486	33.47
Total votes		249,397	100.00
Turnout			
Republican hold			

=== 2010 ===
Georgia's 1st Congressional District Election (2010)
Party	Candidate	Votes	%
Republican	Jack Kingston (Incumbent)	117,270	71.63
Democratic	Oscar L. Harris, II	46,449	28.37
Total votes		163,719	100.00
Turnout			
Republican hold			

=== 2012 ===
Georgia's 1st Congressional District Election (2012)
Party	Candidate	Votes	%
Republican	Jack Kingston (Incumbent)	157,181	62.98
Democratic	Lesli Messinger	92,399	37.02
Total votes		249,580	100.00
Turnout			72.19
Republican hold			

=== 2014 ===
Georgia's 1st Congressional District Election (2014)
Party	Candidate	Votes	%
Republican	Buddy Carter	95,337	60.91
Democratic	Brian Reese	61,175	39.09
Total votes		156,512	100.00
Republican hold			

=== 2016 ===
Georgia's 1st Congressional District Election (2016)
Party	Candidate	Votes	%
Republican	Buddy Carter (Incumbent)	210,243	100.00
Total votes		210,243	100.00
Republican hold			

=== 2018 ===
Georgia's 1st Congressional District Election (2018)
Party	Candidate	Votes	%
Republican	Buddy Carter (Incumbent)	144,501	57.77
Democratic	Lisa Ring	105,633	42.23
Total votes		250,134	100.00
Republican hold			

=== 2020 ===
Georgia's 1st Congressional District Election (2020)
Party	Candidate	Votes	%
Republican	Buddy Carter (Incumbent)	189,457	58.35
Democratic	Joyce Griggs	135,238	41.65
Total votes		324,695	100.00
Republican hold			

=== 2022 ===
Georgia's 1st Congressional District Election (2022)
Party	Candidate	Votes	%
Republican	Buddy Carter (Incumbent)	156,128	59.15
Democratic	Wade Herring	107,837	40.85
Total votes		263,695	100.00
Republican hold			

=== 2024 ===
Georgia's 1st Congressional District Election (2024)
Party	Candidate	Votes	%
Republican	Buddy Carter (Incumbent)	220,576	62.00
Democratic	Patti Hewitt	135,281	38.00
Total votes		355,857	100.00
Republican hold			

== See also ==
- Georgia's congressional districts
- List of United States congressional districts
