= Alma station (Georgia) =

Historic train depot in Georgia, US

- Alma Depot
- U.S. National Register of Historic Places
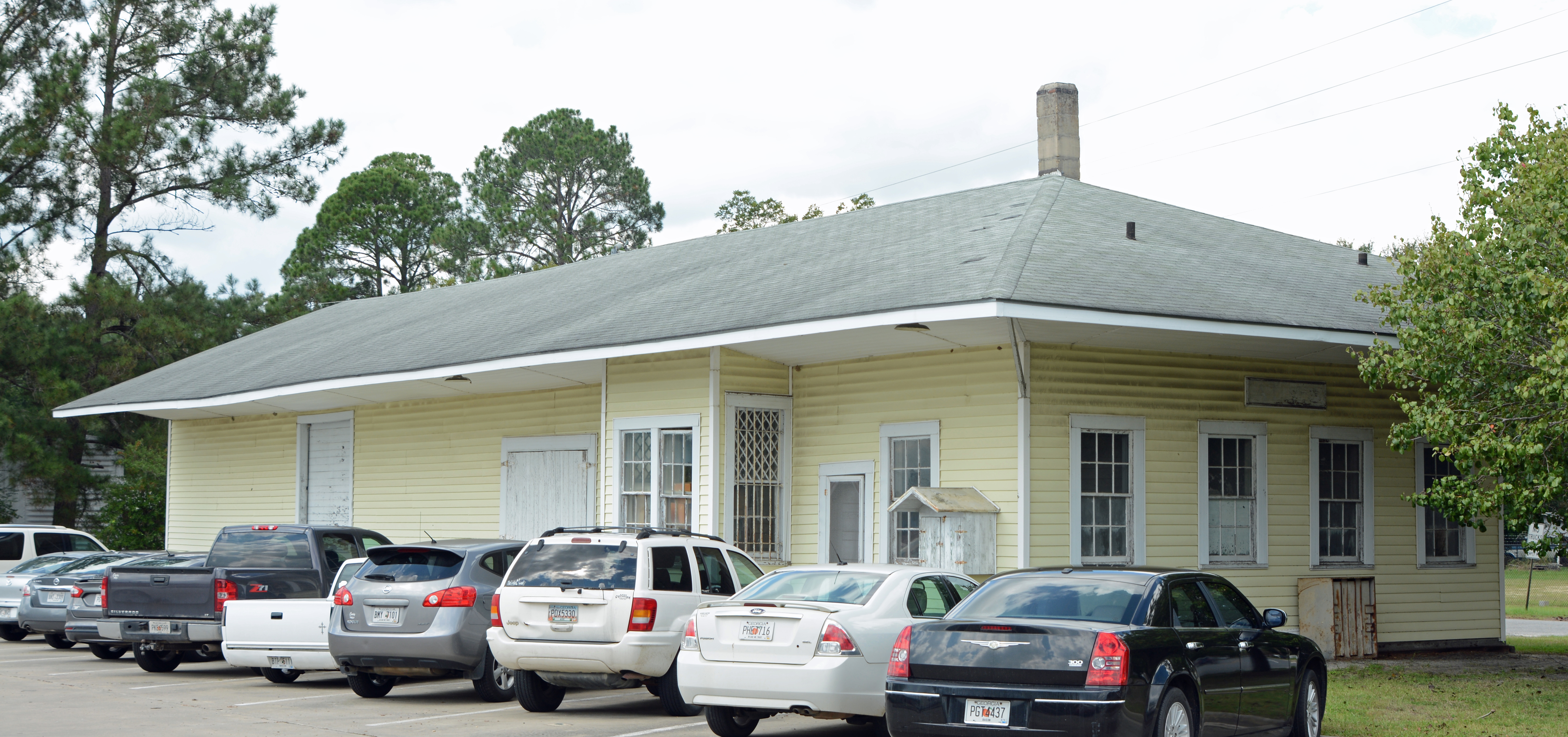

- Location within Georgia
- Location: Dixon and 11th Sts., Alma, Georgia
- Coordinates: 31.54296°N 82.46905°W
- Area: less than one acre
- Built: 1906
- NRHP reference No.: 83000182
- Added to NRHP: April 7, 1983

Alma Depot is a historic site in Alma, Georgia. It is a one-story frame building and was constructed in 1906 in a style similar to many of the era. It is located on Dixon Street and 11th Street. Alma was the first stop of a logging railroad which had been constructed in 1887. When a turpentine company was started about 1899, Alma got its name and a post office. The town was incorporated in 1904. Alma became the county seat of Bacon County when the county was created in 1914. For the first few decades of the town's existence, Alma saw growth along the railroad and around the depot.

At its peak from 1906 until the 1920s, as many as six passenger trains per day stopped at the depot. Passenger service stopped in 1952 and freight service stopped later.

It was added to the National Register of Historic Places in 1983.

== See also ==
- National Register of Historic Places listings in Bacon County, Georgia
- Brunswick and Birmingham Railroad
