= Rabinowitz Building =

Historic building in the US

- U.S. National Register of Historic Places
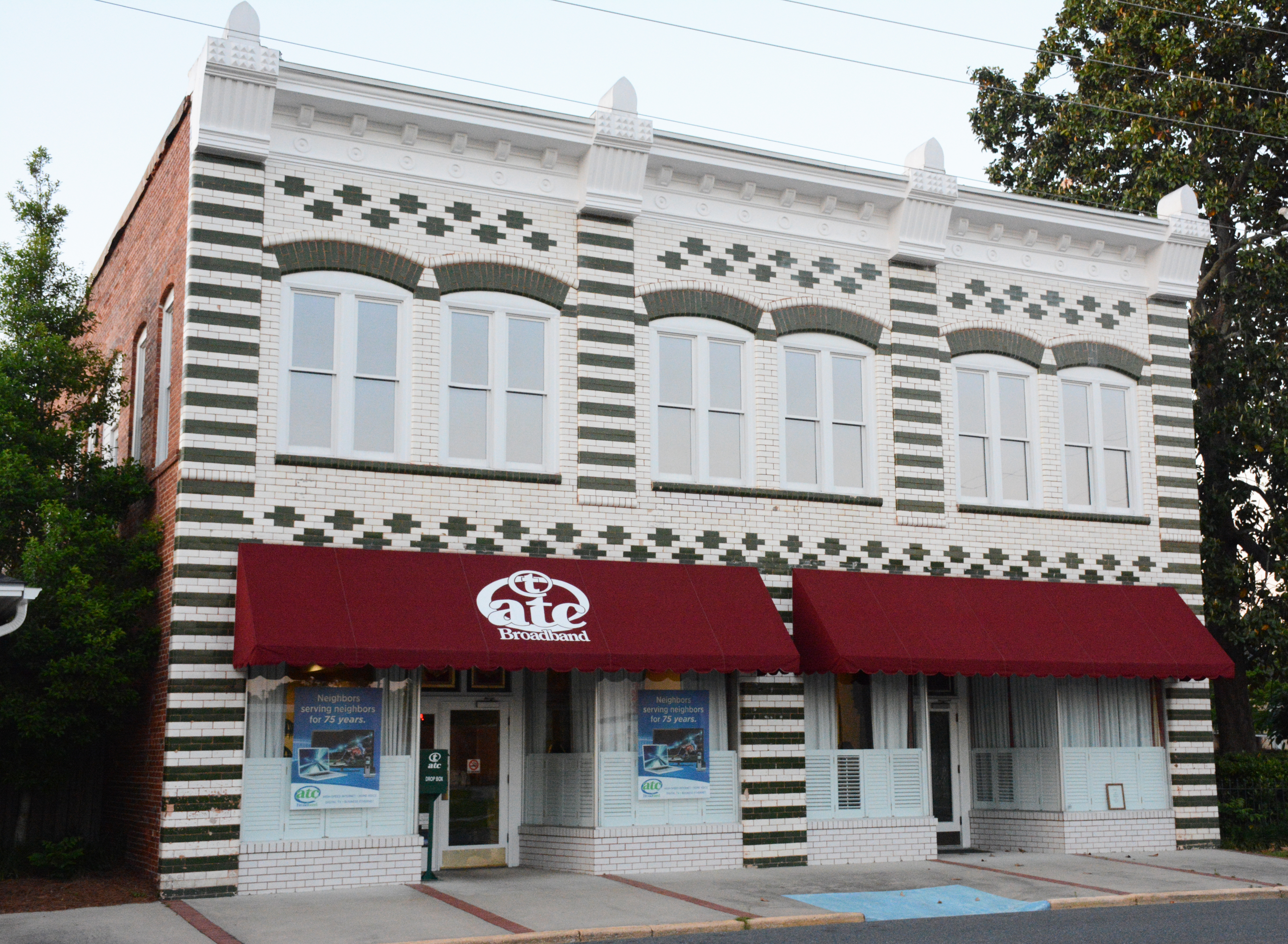

- Location within Georgia
- Location: 203--205 W. Eleventh St., Alma, Georgia
- Coordinates: 31.54306°N 82.466900°W
- Area: less than one acre
- Architectural style: Early Commercial
- NRHP reference No.: 87001238
- Added to NRHP: June 27, 1987

The Rabinowitz Building is a historic building in Alma, Georgia. It was built in 1915 and is located at 203-205 West Eleventh Street. It is a good example of a commercial, multi-use building in a small town. It is unusual as it uses glazed bricks on the front and has an ornamented metal cornice, which seems to have been a specialty of Manning Sullivan, a local builder.

The building was used in commerce by William Rabinowitz (1873-1935), a Jewish immigrant. His residence was at the rear of the building. It is also significant in that the second floor was used as the original county courthouse from 1915 (one year after the formation of the county) until a new courthouse (the Bacon County Courthouse) was built in 1920. The building was added to the National Register of Historic Places on June 27, 1987.

== See also ==
- National Register of Historic Places listings in Bacon County, Georgia
