= Rufus E. Lester =

American politician

Rufus Ezekiel Lester
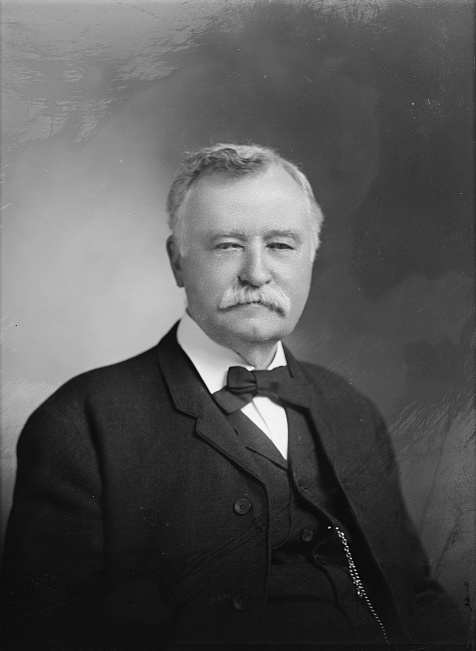
- Rufus Ezekiel Lester taken by C. M. Bell Studios

Member of the U.S. House of Representatives from Georgia's 1st district
- In office March 4, 1889 – June 16, 1906
- Preceded by: Thomas M. Norwood
- Succeeded by: James W. Overstreet

40th Mayor of Savannah, Georgia
- In office 1883–1889
- Preceded by: John Wheaton
- Succeeded by: John Schwarz

Personal details
- Born: December 12, 1837 Near Waynesboro, Georgia, U.S.
- Died: June 16, 1906 (aged 68) Washington, D.C., U.S.
- Cause of death: Falling through skylight
- Resting place: Bonaventure Cemetery, Savannah, Georgia, U.S.
- Party: Democratic
- Education: Mercer University
- Occupation: Attorney

Rufus Ezekiel Lester (December 12, 1837 – June 16, 1906) was a U.S. representative from Georgia.

Born near Waynesboro, Georgia, Lester graduated from Mercer University, Macon, Georgia, in 1857. He studied law. He was admitted to the bar in Savannah, Georgia, and commenced practice in 1859. He entered the military service of the Confederate States Army in 1861 and served throughout the Civil War. He resumed the practice of law in Savannah. He served as member of the Georgia State Senate in 1870–1879 and served as president of that body during the last three years. He served as mayor of Savannah from 1883 to 1889. He was also a slave owner.

Lester was elected as a Democrat to the Fifty-first and to the eight succeeding Congresses and served from March 4, 1889, until his death in Washington, D.C., on June 16, 1906. He served as chairman of the Committee on Expenditures in the Department of State (Fifty-second and Fifty-third Congresses).

== Death ==
He died after an accident in which he fell through a skylight on the roof of The Cairo, the Washington, D.C. apartment building where he resided. Lester went to the roof to look for his two young grandchildren and apparently missed his footing, fell about 30 feet through the skylight, and landed on the building's eleventh floor. He broke both legs and sustained internal injuries which proved fatal.

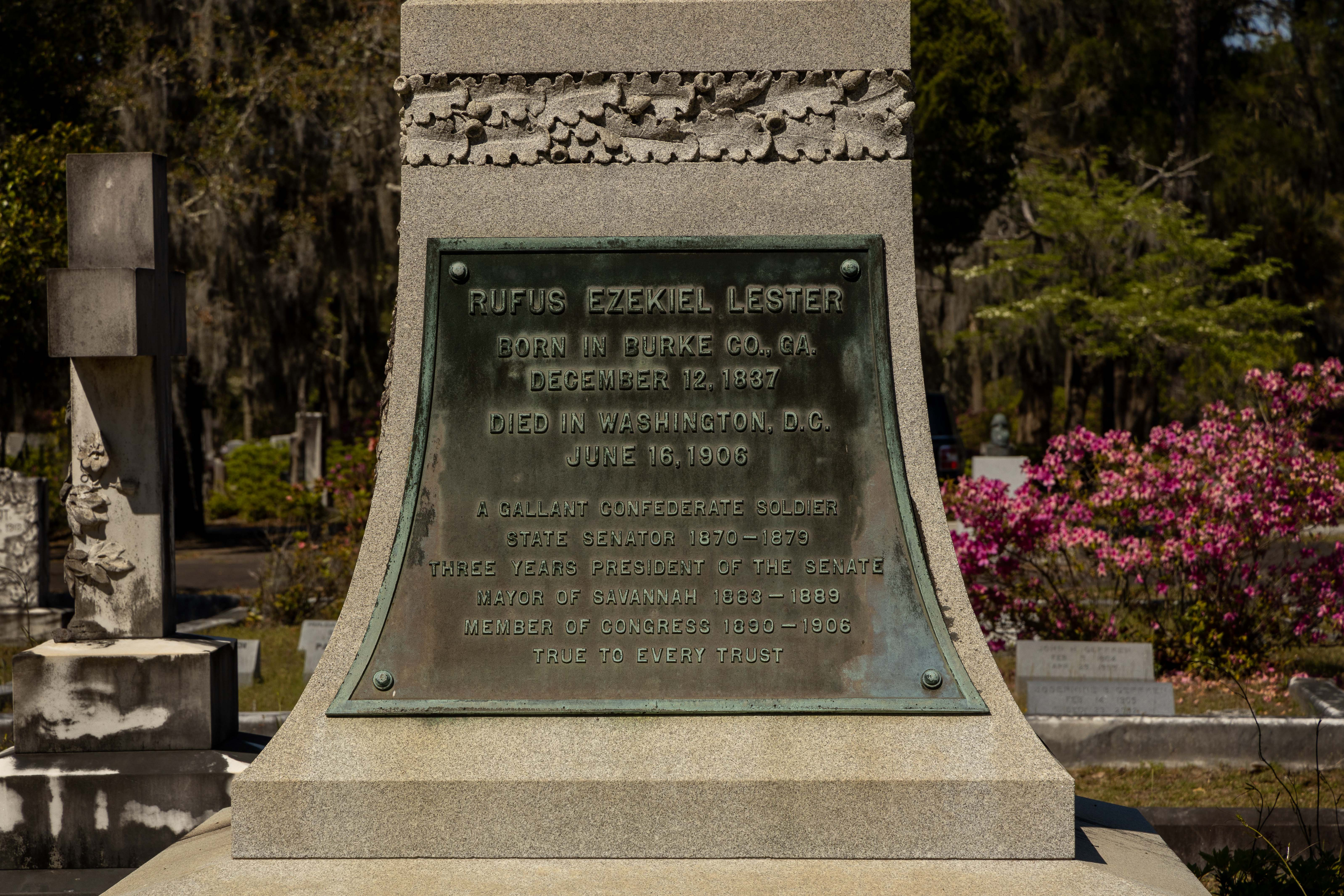
Headstone at Bonaventure Cemetery in Savannah

He was interred at Bonaventure Cemetery in Savannah, Georgia.

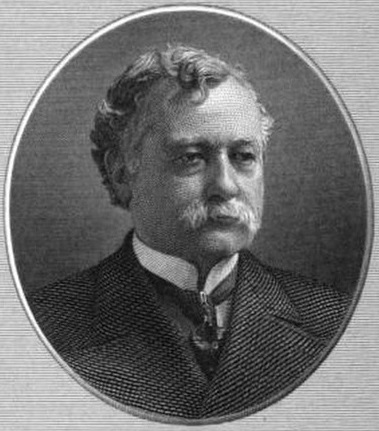
Frontispiece of 1907's Rufus Ezekiel Lester, Late a Representative.

== See also ==
- List of members of the United States Congress who died in office (1900–1949)

Political offices
Preceded by John Wheaton	Mayor of Savannah; 1883–1889	Succeeded by John Schwarz
U.S. House of Representatives
Preceded by Thomas M. Norwood	Member of the U.S. House of Representatives from Georgia's 1st congressional district March 4, 1889 – June 16, 1906	Succeeded by James W. Overstreet
