= Harry Crews =

American novelist

Harry Eugene Crews
- Born: June 7, 1935; Alma, Georgia, U.S.
- Died: March 28, 2012 (aged 76); Gainesville, Florida, U.S.
- Education: University of Florida
- Occupation: Writer
- Writing career
- Genres: Novel, short story, essay
- Notable works: The Gospel Singer, A Feast of Snakes, A Childhood: The Biography of a Place
- Literary movement: Grit Lit

Harry Eugene Crews (June 7, 1935 – March 28, 2012) was an American novelist, short story writer, and essayist. He often made use of violent, grotesque characters and set them in regions of the Deep South.

== Life ==
Harry Crews was born June 7, 1935, during the Great Depression to two poor tenant farmers in Bacon County, Georgia. His father died while he was still a baby, and his mother soon remarried to his father's brother. Crews was unaware that this man was not his biological father until years later.

As a child, he suffered two near-death experiences. When he was just five he contracted polio, causing his legs to fold up into the back of his thighs. He was originally told by doctors that he would not be able to walk again. After about a year of being immobile, except crawling with his hands, his legs straightened again and he was able to walk. Soon after this experience, he then fell into a vat of nearly boiling water, which was being used for soaking dead hogs before they were further prepared. His head did not go under the water, which saved his life, according to doctors. He suffered extreme burns on most of the rest of his body. He once again was unable to leave the bed when he was healing. Crews wrote of growing up, "Nearly everybody I knew had something missing, a finger cut off, a toe split, an ear half-chewed away, an eye clouded with blindness from a glancing fence staple. And if they didn't have something missing, they were carrying scars from barbed wire, or knives, or fishhooks."

While Crews was still a child, his mother left his stepfather, and he and his brother went with her to live in the Springfield section of Jacksonville, Florida. Crews finished high school there as a below average student. After graduation, he joined the Marines during the Korean War. After his service, he attended the University of Florida on the G.I. Bill. Here, Crews became a student of Andrew Nelson Lytle, who had also taught Flannery O'Connor, and James Dickey. Crews and Lytle kept in contact for years afterwards, and Lytle provided criticism of Crews's early work. Crews graduated from the University of Florida in 1960 with a degree in English, and eventually received a graduate degree of education. Crews taught English, which he did for the rest of his career, along with his writing career. In 1963, he published his first story: "The Unattached Smile". In 1964, he published another short story, "A Long Wail".

After an unplanned pregnancy, Crews married Sally Ellis, who gave birth to his first son, Patrick Scott. Sally soon wanted a divorce due to his infidelity and obsessiveness with writing. "I was obsessed to the point of desperation with becoming a writer," he wrote, "and, further, I lived with the conviction that I had gotten a late start toward that difficult goal… Consequently, perhaps I was impatient, irritable, and inattentive toward Sally as a young woman and mother." However, he soon convinced Sally to remarry, and they had a second son, Byron Jason.

In 1964 his first son, Patrick, drowned in a neighbor's pool. Crews tried mouth-to-mouth resuscitation. After the death of his son, Crews continued writing his first novel, The Gospel Singer, published in 1968. This was followed soon after by his second novel, Naked in Garden Hills. Both were well received by critics at the time. In 1972, Sally asked for a second and final divorce. Crews did not marry again. His sole surviving son, Byron Jason Crews, is personal representative and acting executor of the Harry Crews Literary Estate.

== Writing career and style ==
After Crews's first two novels, he wrote prolifically, including novels, screenplays and essays, for journals including Esquire and Playboy. He often set precise due times to finish whatever he was working on, and so had quick turnaround between writings. Once he published The Gospel Singer, he began to write eight novels, publishing one almost every year. Much of Crews's work is now out of print.

His works were known to feature "freaks", and "outcasts", usually from rural areas. In Car, a man consumes an entire car by slowly eating piece by piece. In The Knockout Artist, a poor, Georgia-born boxer with a glass jaw knocks himself out at parties for money. A Feast of Snakes, one of his best known, and most provocative novels, was banned for a time in South Africa.

Crews felt strongly that authors should write about experiences that they have actually had. In his personal life, he often moved from obsession to obsession, and became knowledgeable on many subjects. Crews and Sally learned karate together, which then influenced Karate Is a Thing of the Spirit. In addition, The Hawk is Dying features an amateur hawk trainer who deals with condescension from college professors, and features a son-figure who drowns. Crews himself had a fascination with hawks for a period of time, and even trapped and trained them so they would sit on his arm. Body is a story about a competitive female body builder, her trainer, and her lower-class family from Waycross, Georgia. Crews himself trained his girlfriend, Maggie Powell, who would become a Southeast bodybuilding champion.

During his time writing for Esquire, he wrote a column called "Grits" for fourteen months in the 1970s that covered such topics as cockfighting and dog fighting. Filled with rough experiences he had outside of urban life, "grits" became a term he used to describe the tough southern characters featured in his writing.

Crews continued writing and publishing his entire life. As his reputation grew, he became a favorite of Madonna, Sean Penn, Kim Gordon, and Thurston Moore. Madonna and Penn discussed making film adaptations of his novels, but these never came to fruition. Crews's final novel, An American Family, featured a blurb on the cover from Moore, saying, "God bless Harry Crews, America's best writer. He’ll break your heart but he'll always bring you love."

The University of Georgia acquired Crews's papers in August 2006. The archive includes manuscripts and typescripts of his fiction, correspondence, and notes made by Crews while on assignment.

Crews died on March 28, 2012, from complications of neuropathy. His sole surviving son, Byron J. Crews, is professor emeritus of English and Dramatic Writing at Wright State University in Dayton, Ohio.

== Influence and Grit Lit ==
Harry Crews's work has become synonymous with the genre grit lit. Crews is considered a major influence, alongside Flannery O’Connor, Cormac McCarthy, and Barry Hannah, along with later writers in the genre including Larry Brown, Dorothy Allison, and Donald Ray Pollock. Grit Lit is usually set in rural areas and often in what has been called the "Rough South". Larry Brown, one of the most celebrated writers in the genre, objected to the term "Grit Lit", but he dedicated his novel, Fay, to Crews, calling him "my uncle in all ways but blood." He and Crews remained friends until Brown's death in 2004.

Grit Lit: A Rough South Reader, defines the genre as "typically blue collar or working class, mostly small town, sometimes rural, occasionally but not always violent, usually but not necessarily Southern." The subjects of the stories often have to deal with extreme circumstances for survival. The characters usually use their roughness, depravity, and violence as a means of living. Crews's work has become synonymous with the "Rough South," though he did not like the label "Southern writer". Grit Lit itself can become an "acquired taste", for those not from the South.

Harry Crews's experiences as a poor boy from Bacon County, Georgia, have made a major impact on his own stories. Many other Grit Lit writers are from working-class backgrounds as well, and use their experiences as a tool for writing their stories with accuracy. Crews has said, "A writer's job is to get naked, to hide nothing, to look away from nothing, to look at it. To not blink, to not be embarrassed by it or ashamed of it. Strip it down and let's get to where the blood is, where the bone is."

== In popular culture ==
- Crews scripted the original draft of 1985 thriller The New Kids, but was not pleased with the finished film; his name does not appear in the credits, which attribute the story and screenplay to Stephen Gyllenhaal and Brian Taggert.
- Kim Gordon (of Sonic Youth), Lydia Lunch, and Sadie Mae named their band Harry Crews after him. They released one album, Naked in Garden Hills, in 1989.
- Crews was the subject of the first installment of the Rough South documentary series written and directed by Gary Hawkins. The film, entitled The Rough South of Harry Crews, won a regional Emmy Award and the Corporation for Public Broadcasting's Gold Award in 1992.
- In the documentary Searching for the Wrong-Eyed Jesus (2004), Crews tells his grisly homespun Southern stories while walking down a rural dirt track.
- Acclaimed Asheville, North Carolina indie rock band Wednesday (American band) has a song titled "Feast of Snakes" that directly references various events and scenes in the titular novel; several lines in the song are word-for-word quotations of passages in Crews's book
- Crews played a brief role in Sean Penn's The Indian Runner and dedicated his book Scar Lover to Penn.
- In 2007, another documentary was released: Harry Crews – Survival Is Triumph Enough. The personal format is loosely based on an interview with artist and filmmaker Tyler Turkle, and the themes explored include hardship, tragedy and loss throughout Crews' life.
- Kansas City band Season to Risk wrote and recorded a song on their eponymous first album in 1993, entitled "Snakes", which is inspired by the Crews novel A Feast of Snakes.
- Florida Trend magazine released an interview with Harry Crews posthumously in April 2012. The interview contains some notable quotes, such as, "I've never begun a novel that I knew how it ended. I just start and try to find out what it is I think about whatever it is I am writing about." Another quote: "Listen, if you want to write about all sweetness and light and that stuff, go get a job at Hallmark."

== See also ==
- Southern Gothic
- Southern Renaissance

== Bibliography ==
=== Novels ===
- The Gospel Singer, 1968
- Naked in Garden Hills, 1969
- This Thing Don't Lead to Heaven, 1970
- Karate Is a Thing of the Spirit, 1971
- Car, 1972
- The Hawk Is Dying, 1973
- The Gypsy's Curse, 1974
- A Feast of Snakes, 1976
- All We Need of Hell, 1987
- The Knockout Artist, 1988
- Body, 1990
- Scar Lover, 1992
- The Mulching of America, 1995
- The Gospel Singer/Where Does One Go When One Has No Place Left to Go, 1995
- Celebration, 1998
- An American Family: The Baby with the Curious Markings, 2006

=== Collections ===
- Blood and Grits, 1979 [A collection of essays.]
- Florida Frenzy, 1982 [A collection of essays.]
- Classic Crews: A Harry Crews Reader, 1993 [Includes: Car (1972), The Gypsy's Curse (1974), A Childhood: The Biography of a Place (1978), and the essays, "The Car" (1975), "Climbing the Tower" (1977), and "Fathers, Sons, Blood" (1985).]

=== Limited editions ===
- The Enthusiast, 1981 [The first chapter of All We Need of Hell, limited edition of 200 signed copies.]
- Two By Crews, 1984 [Two essays, limited edition of 200 signed copies.]
- Madonna at Ringside, 1991 [Limited edition of 275 numbered copies and 26 lettered copies, all signed by Harry Crews.]
- Where Does One Go When There's No Place Left to Go?, 1995/1998 [Published in 1995, along with The Gospel Singer. Reissued separately, in 1998, as a limited edition of 400 signed copies.]

=== Autobiography ===
- A Childhood: The Biography of a Place, 1978
- — (Winter 2011). "We are all of us passing through" (PDF). The Georgia Review. 65 (4): 723–735. Archived from the original (PDF) on April 1, 2014.
  - Reprinted in Henderson, Bill, ed. (2013). The Pushcart Prize XXXVII : best of the small presses 2013. Pushcart Press. pp. 37–49.

=== Unpublished works ===
- Bone Grinder (novel)
- The Wrong Affair
- Assault of Memory

There are a number of unpublished works in the author's archive at the University of Georgia, Athens. The whereabouts of The Wrong Affair is not known. Assault of Memory is the follow-up to A Childhood: the Biography of a Place and certain parts were published in literary journals, whereas some parts required a signed permission from the author to view in the archive.
