= A Feast of Snakes =

Novel by Harry Crews

- First edition
- Author: Harry Crews
- Language: English
- Genre: Southern Gothic
- Publisher: Atheneum Books
- Publication date: January 1976
- Publication place: United States
- Pages: 177
- ISBN: 0689107293
- Preceded by: The Gypsy's Curse
- Followed by: The Enthusiast

A Feast of Snakes is a novel by Harry Crews. It was published by Atheneum Books in 1976. Many critics consider it to be Crews's best novel. It would be his last for more than a decade.

== Summary ==
The novel is set in Mystic, Georgia in 1975, and primarily follows Joe Lon Mackey, a former high school football star, who now is an alcoholic, abusive husband, and father. Coming up is this year's Rattlesnake Roundup, a time when people come to hunt, kill, and eat snakes in the town. Joe Lon's old high school sweetheart, Berenice has come back to town for the hunt, and their old romance is rekindled.

Meanwhile, Buddy Matlow, the local sheriff, is abusing women. One of whom he rapes is Lottie May, a young black woman. Lottie May eventually defends herself from one of these attacks by cutting off Buddy's penis with a straight razor she gets from Joe Lon's insane sister, Beeder. Because of this, Buddy is not around to control the chaos emerging at the Rattlesnake Roundup.

Joe Lon eventually starts to lose his sanity amongst the violence in the town. This finally culminates during the Rattlesnake Roundup when he grabs a gun and begins to kill those there, including Berenice, to “be in control again”. Joe Lon is then tossed into a pit of snakes by the people.

== Reception ==
Kirkus Reviews gave the novel a glowing review, writing that "Crews is a true regional writer out of the heart of the redneck rural south and besides the brutality . . . there's the humor, the dynamite dialogue, and the real despair--all tetched with talent." Guy Owen, in The Georgia Review, called it a "surrealistic study of violence and competitiveness in the South." Time thought that it was "full of brilliant descriptions and characters attempting to kick and gouge their way through some back door to salvation." The Virginia Quarterly Review described the paperback edition as "a fierce and funny account of life in Mystic." The Quietus also praised the book, saying "the novel's heart pulsates with violence but the prose is such that the words sing and rise right off the page."

A Feast of Snakes was for a time banned in South Africa.

== Background ==
The Rattlesnake Roundup is based on an actual event held annually in Claxton, Georgia.
