= James W. Overstreet =

American politician (1866–1938)

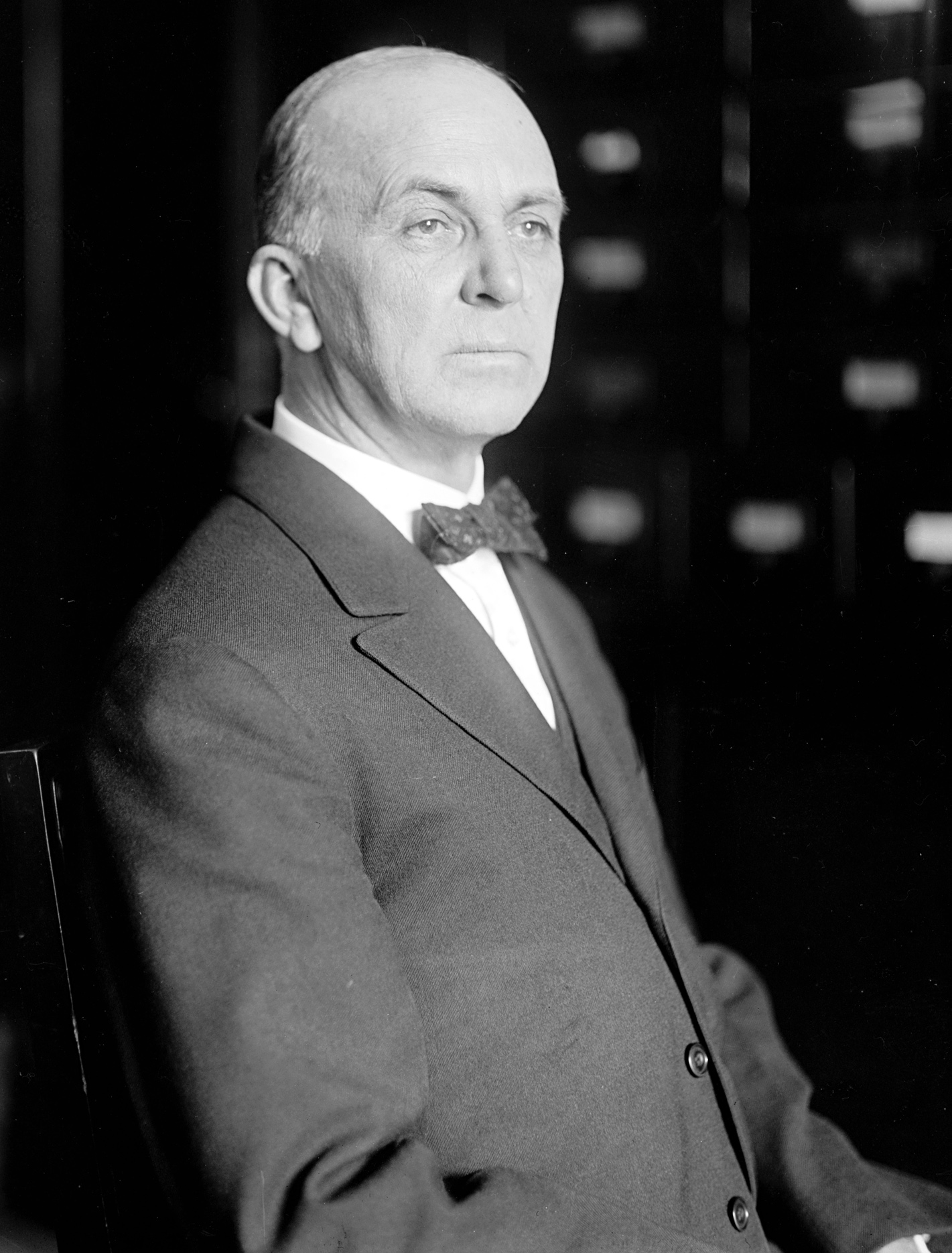

Member of the U.S. House of Representatives from Georgia's 1st district
- In office March 4, 1917 – March 3, 1923
- Preceded by: Charles G. Edwards
- Succeeded by: R. Lee Moore
- In office October 3, 1906 – March 3, 1907
- Preceded by: Rufus E. Lester
- Succeeded by: Charles G. Edwards

Member of the Georgia House of Representatives
- In office 1898–1899

Personal details
- Born: James Whetstone Overstreet; August 28, 1866 near Sylvania, Georgia, U.S.
- Died: December 4, 1938 (aged 72) Sylvania, Georgia, U.S.
- Resting place: Sylvania Cemetery, Sylvania, Georgia, U.S.
- Party: Democratic
- Education: Mercer University
- Occupation: Politician, lawyer

James Whetstone Overstreet (August 28, 1866 – December 4, 1938) was a U.S. representative from Georgia.

Born on a farm near Sylvania, Georgia, Overstreet attended the rural schools and Sylvania High School. He was graduated from Mercer University in 1888. He studied law in Augusta. He was admitted to the bar in 1892 and commenced practice in Sylvania, Georgia. He served as member of the State house of representatives in 1898 and 1899. He served as member of the Democratic executive committee in 1905 and 1906. He was appointed judge of the city court of Sylvania in December 1902 and served until October 1, 1906, when he resigned.

Overstreet was elected as a Democrat to the Fifty-ninth Congress to fill the vacancy caused by the death of Rufus E. Lester and served from October 3, 1906, to March 3, 1907. He resumed the practice of law in Sylvania. He served as delegate to the Democratic National Convention in 1912.

Overstreet was elected to the Sixty-fifth, Sixty-sixth, and Sixty-seventh Congresses (March 4, 1917 – March 3, 1923). He was an unsuccessful candidate for renomination in 1922. He resumed the practice of law in Sylvania, Georgia, where he died December 4, 1938. He was interred in Sylvania Cemetery.

U.S. House of Representatives
Preceded by Rufus E. Lester	Member of the U.S. House of Representatives from Georgia's 1st congressional district October 3, 1906 – March 3, 1907	Succeeded by Charles G. Edwards
Preceded by Charles G. Edwards	Member of the U.S. House of Representatives from Georgia's 1st congressional district March 4, 1917 – March 3, 1923	Succeeded by R. Lee Moore
