= National Register of Historic Places listings in Bacon County, Georgia =

This is a list of properties and districts in Bacon County, Georgia that are listed on the National Register of Historic Places (NRHP).

This National Park Service list is complete through NPS recent listings posted December 19, 2025.

== Current listings ==
| | Name on the Register | Image | Date listed | Location | City or town | Description |
|---|---|---|---|---|---|---|
| 1 | Alma Depot | Alma Depot | April 7, 1983 (#83000182) | Dixon and 11th Sts. 31°32′35″N 82°28′09″W | Alma | Built in 1906 |
| 2 | Bacon County Courthouse | Bacon County Courthouse | September 18, 1980 (#80000967) | Main St. 31°32′28″N 82°27′46″W | Alma | Built in 1919 |
| 3 | Bacon County School | Bacon County School | December 26, 2007 (#07001307) | 504 N Pierce St. 31°32′42″N 82°27′44″W | Alma | Built in 1933 |
| 4 | Rabinowitz Building | Rabinowitz Building | June 27, 1987 (#87001238) | 203-205 W. Eleventh St. 31°32′35″N 82°28′01″W | Alma | Built in 1915 |
