= Julian Hartridge =

American politician (1829–1879)

Julian Hartridge (September 9, 1829 – January 8, 1879) was an American politician from Georgia.

== Early years and education ==
Hartridge was born on September 9, 1829, in Savannah, Georgia, where he attended Chatham Academy and Montpelier Institute. Hartridge graduated from Brown University in 1848 and Harvard Law School in 1850. He was admitted to the bar in 1851 and practiced law in Savannah with Walter Scott Chisholm. He served as the Solicitor of the Eastern District of Georgia from 1854 to 1858.

== Political career ==
Hartridge was a member of the Georgia House of Representatives 1858 to 1859. He represented the state in the First Confederate Congress and the Second Confederate Congress. During the Civil War Hartridge served one year in the Confederate Army as a lieutenant in the Chatham Artillery. After the war he returned to politics, and was elected as a Democrat to the Forty-fourth Congress and the Forty-fifth Congress, serving from 1875 until his death in Washington, D.C., in 1879.

== Death and legacy ==
In an article printed in the New York Times, after his death, it was reported that Representative Hartridge was much admired by colleagues on both sides of the aisle. The funeral for Rep. Hartridge was attended by the President, Cabinet members, Justices of the Supreme Court and other dignitaries. Hartridge was buried in Laurel Grove Cemetery in Savannah. The French-speaking American author Julien Green and Savannah preservationist Walter Hartridge were his grandsons.

== See also ==
- List of members of the United States Congress who died in office (1790–1899)

U.S. House of Representatives
Preceded by Andrew Sloan	Member of the U.S. House of Representatives from Georgia's 1st congressional district March 4, 1875 – January 8, 1879	Succeeded by William Bennett Fleming
