= William B. Fleming =

American politician (1803–1886)

Member of the U.S. House of Representatives from Georgia's 1st district
- In office February 10, 1879 – March 3, 1879
- Preceded by: Julian Hartridge
- Succeeded by: John C. Nicholls

Personal details
- Born: William Bennett Fleming; October 29, 1803 near Flemington, Georgia, U.S.
- Died: August 19, 1886 (aged 82) Walthourville, Georgia, U.S.
- Resting place: Laurel Grove Cemetery, Savannah, Georgia, U.S.
- Party: Democratic
- Profession: Politician, lawyer, judge

William Bennett Fleming (October 29, 1803 – August 19, 1886) was a U.S. Representative from Georgia.

Born on a plantation near Flemington, Georgia, Fleming attended the common schools and1 graduated from Yale College in 1825. He studied law. He was admitted to the bar and practiced in Savannah, Georgia. He served as judge of the superior court of Chatham County, Georgia from 1847 to 1849 and 1853–1868. He resumed the practice of law in Savannah. Recorder of the city of Savannah from 1868 until the office was abolished.

Fleming was elected as a Democrat to the Forty-fifth Congress to fill the vacancy caused by the death of Julian Hartridge and served from February 10, 1879, to March 3, 1879. He was not a candidate for renomination. He served as again judge of the superior court from 1879 until 1881, when he resigned on account of ill health. He retired to Walthourville, Georgia, and died there August 19, 1886. He was interred in Laurel Grove Cemetery, Savannah, Georgia.

U.S. House of Representatives
Preceded by Julian Hartridge	Member of the U.S. House of Representatives from Georgia's 1st congressional district 1879	Succeeded by John C. Nicholls
