= Bacon County Courthouse =

Historic courthouse in the US

- U.S. National Register of Historic Places
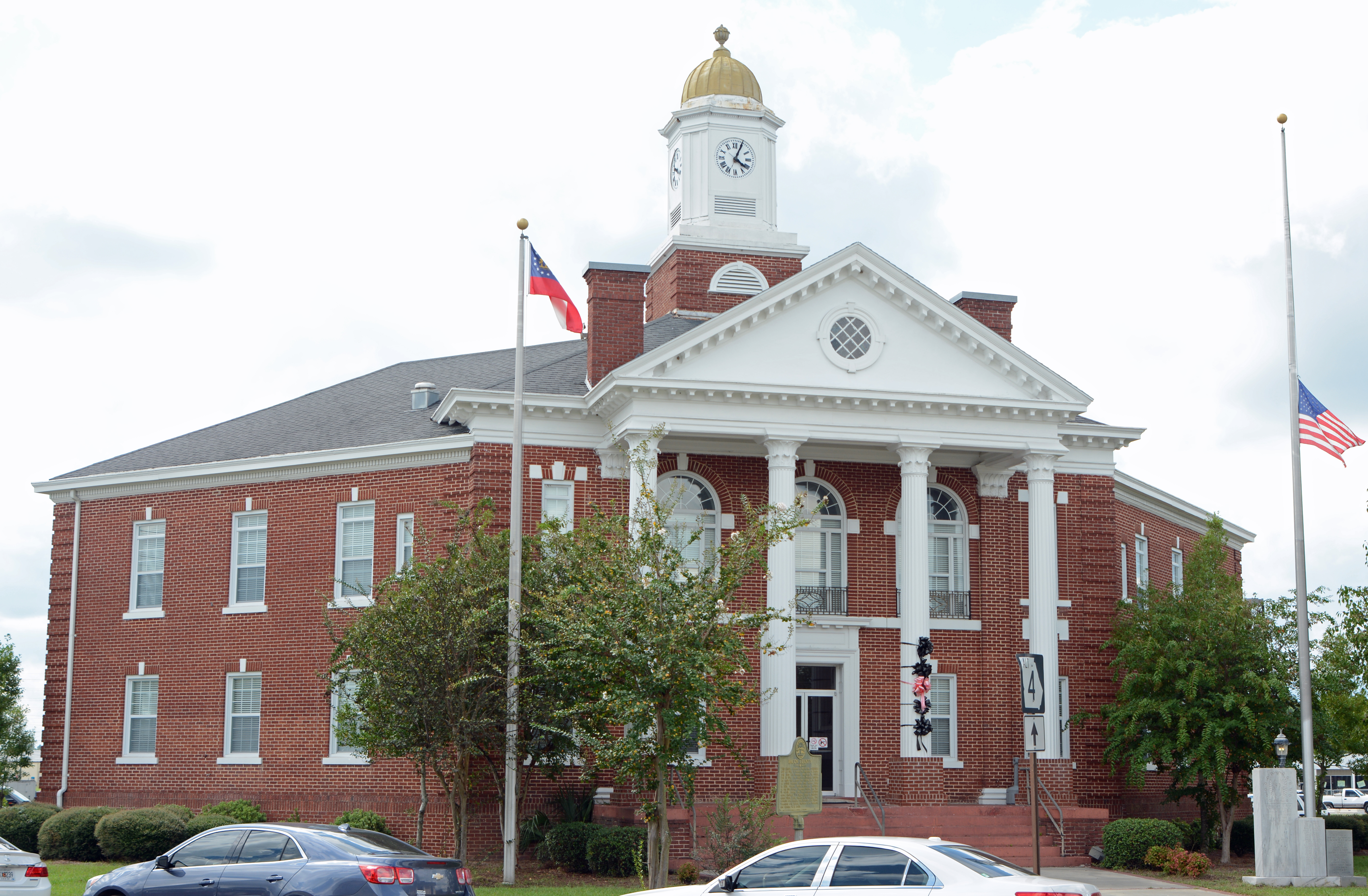

- Location within Georgia Location within the United States
- Location: Main St., Alma, Georgia
- Coordinates: 31°32′28″N 82°27′46″W
- Area: less than one acre
- Built: 1919–1920
- Built by: R.W. Wimbish
- Architect: J.J. Baldwin
- Architectural style: Classical Revival
- MPS: Georgia County Courthouses TR
- NRHP reference No.: 80000967
- Added to NRHP: September 18, 1980

The Bacon County Courthouse is a historic county courthouse on Main Street in Alma, Bacon County, Georgia. It was designed by architect J. J. Baldwin and completed in 1920. The Rabinowitz Building was temporally used as the courthouse during the construction of the current courthouse. It was added to the National Register of Historic Places on September 18, 1980.

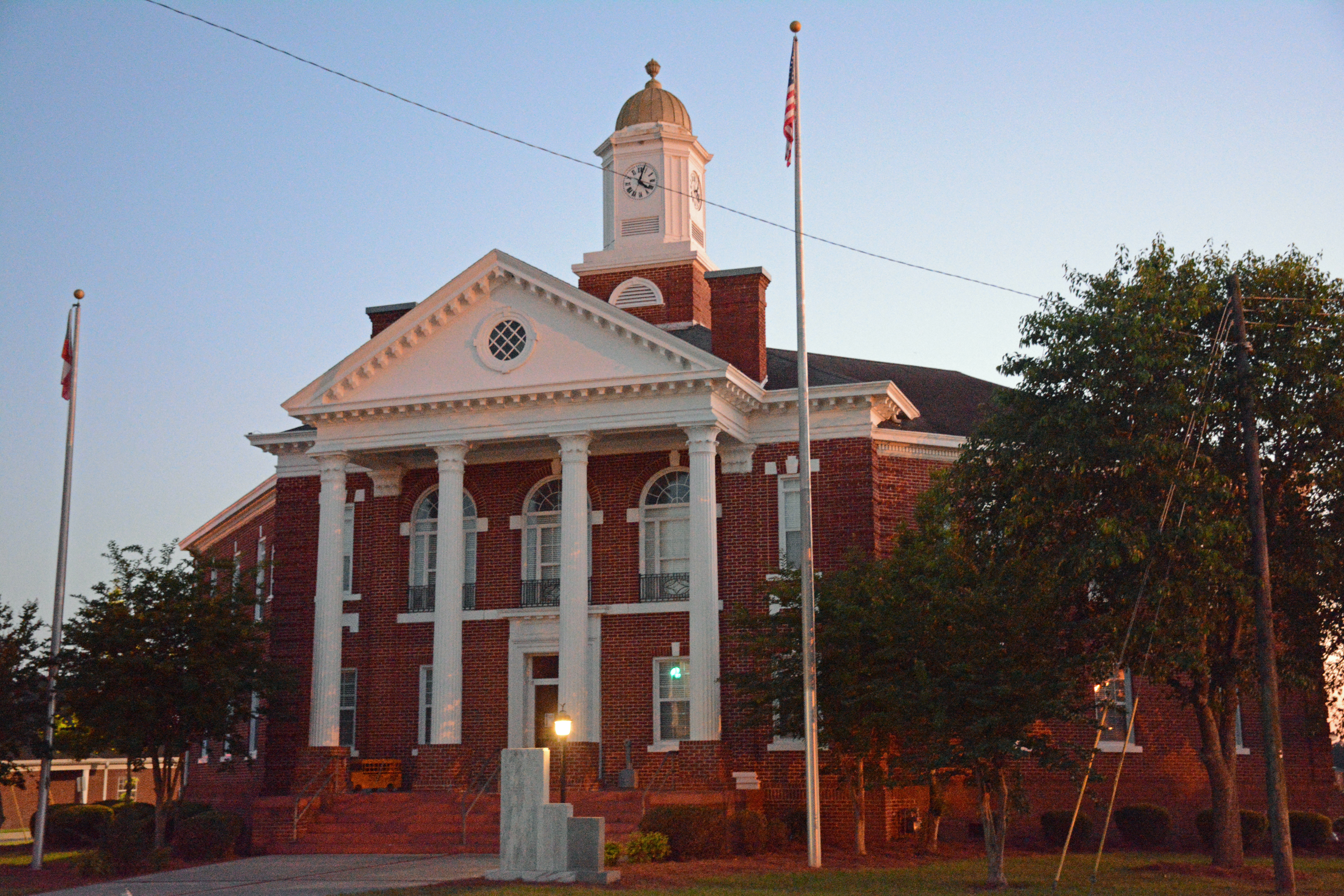
Courthouse after sundown

According to its National Register nomination, the courthouse is one of only two in Georgia whose main entrances face the corner of a block. The other is the Morgan County Courthouse in Madison, Georgia.

== See also ==
- National Register of Historic Places listings in Bacon County, Georgia
