= John C. Nicholls =

American politician

John Calhoun Nicholls (April 25, 1834 – December 25, 1893) was a U.S. Representative from Georgia.

Born in Clinton, Georgia, Nicholls attended private schools and graduated from the College of William and Mary, Williamsburg, Virginia, in 1855. After studying law, he was admitted to the bar in 1855 and practiced in Clinch and Ware Counties, Georgia. He was practicing law in Waynesville, Wayne County, Georgia by 1860. During the Civil War he first served in the Confederate States Army as captain, Sea Coast Guard, commissioned a brigadier general of the 2nd Brigade of the 6th Division Georgia Militia, and then served as a captain, Company I, of the Fourth Regiment, Georgia Cavalry. After the war, Nicholls was a lawyer in Blackshear, Georgia. He served as member of the State constitutional convention in 1865, as a delegate to the Democratic National Convention in 1876, and in the Georgia State Senate from 1870 to 1875. Nicholls was elected as a Democrat to the Forty-sixth Congress (March 4, 1879 – March 3, 1881), was an unsuccessful candidate for renomination in 1880, but was elected to the Forty-eighth Congress (March 4, 1883 – March 3, 1885). After becoming an unsuccessful candidate for renomination in 1884, he resumed the practice of law in Blackshear, Georgia, where he died December 25, 1893. He was interred in Blackshear Cemetery.

Nicholls is the namesake of the city of Nicholls, Georgia.

== Notes ==
U.S. House of Representatives
Preceded by William Bennett Fleming	Member of the U.S. House of Representatives from Georgia's 1st congressional district March 4, 1879 – March 3, 1881	Succeeded by George R. Black
Preceded by George R. Black	Member of the U.S. House of Representatives from Georgia's 1st congressional district March 4, 1883 – March 3, 1885	Succeeded by Thomas M. Norwood
