= George Robison Black =

American politician

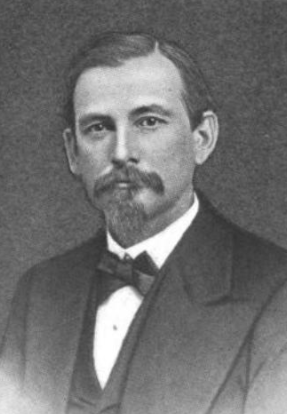

Member of the U.S. House of Representatives from Georgia's 1st district
- In office March 4, 1881 – March 3, 1883
- Preceded by: John C. Nicholls
- Succeeded by: John C. Nicholls

Member of the Georgia Senate from the 17th district
- In office January 13, 1875 – February 22, 1877
- Preceded by: Joseph S. Cone
- Succeeded by: Herman H. Perry

Personal details
- Born: March 24, 1835 Near Jacksonboro, Georgia, US
- Died: November 3, 1886 (aged 51) Sylvania, Georgia, US
- Party: Democratic
- Profession: Attorney

Military service
- Allegiance: Confederate States of America
- Branch/service: Confederate States Army
- Rank: Lieutenant colonel
- Commands: 63rd Georgia Regiment
- Battles/wars: American Civil War

George Robison Black (March 24, 1835 – November 3, 1886) was an American slave owner, politician and lawyer. His wife, Nellie Peters Black, became a prominent social activist.

== Biography ==
Black was born at his family's slave plantation near Jacksonboro, Georgia, as the son of Edward Junius Black and Augusta George Anna Kirkland Black. He attended the University of Georgia (UGA) in Athens and the University of South Carolina in Columbia. He studied law, was admitted to the bar in 1857 and began practice in Savannah, Georgia.

During the American Civil War, Black served in the Confederate States Army as a first lieutenant in the Phoenix Riflemen and later as a lieutenant colonel of the Sixty-third Georgia Regiment.

After the war, Black participated in the Georgia constitutional convention in 1865 and was a delegate to the 1872 Democratic National Convention. He later served as state Senator from 1875 to 1877 and was the vice president of the Georgia State Agricultural Society. Black was elected to the United States House of Representatives in 1880 as a Democrat in the 47th Congress; however, he lost his reelection campaign in 1882. He died in Sylvania, Georgia, in 1886 and was buried in Sylvania Cemetery.

== Sources ==
- United States Congress. "George Robison Black (id: B000497)". Biographical Directory of the United States Congress. Retrieved on April 14, 2009

U.S. House of Representatives
Preceded by John C. Nicholls	Member of the U.S. House of Representatives from Georgia's 1st congressional district March 4, 1881 – March 3, 1883	Succeeded by John C. Nicholls
