= Charles G. Edwards =

American politician

Charles Gordon Edwards
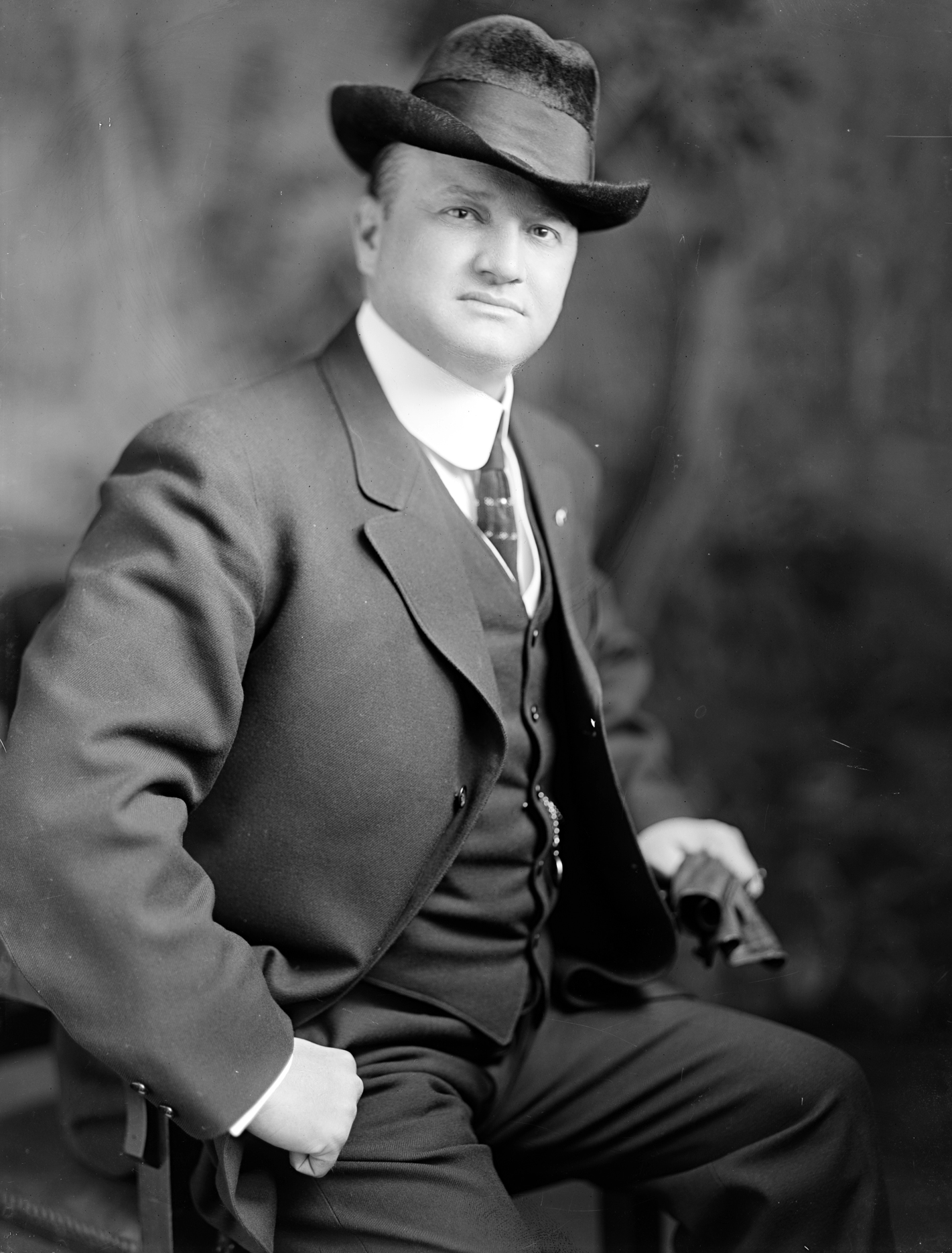

Member of the U.S. House of Representatives from Georgia's 1st district
- In office March 4, 1925 – July 13, 1931
- Preceded by: R. Lee Moore
- Succeeded by: Homer C. Parker
- In office March 4, 1907 – March 3, 1917
- Preceded by: James W. Overstreet
- Succeeded by: James W. Overstreet

Personal details
- Born: July 2, 1878 Daisy, Georgia, United States
- Died: July 13, 1931 (aged 53) Atlanta, Georgia, United States
- Party: Democratic
- Education: Gordon Institute; Florida State College; University of Georgia
- Profession: lawyer, politician

Military service
- Branch/service: Georgia National Guard
- Years of service: 1900–1904

Charles Gordon Edwards (July 2, 1878 – July 13, 1931) was an American lawyer and political figure from the state of Georgia, serving a total of 8 terms over two separate stints in the U.S. House of Representatives between 1907 and 1931.

== Early years and education ==
Edwards was born in Daisy, Georgia in 1878 and attended the Gordon Institute in Barnesville, Georgia and Florida State College in Lake City (now the University of Florida). He then studied law at the University of Georgia School of Law, was a member of the Phi Kappa Literary Society and graduated with a Bachelor of Laws (LL.B.) degree in 1898, gained admission to the state bar and began the practice of law in Reidsville, Georgia.

After moving to Savannah, Georgia in 1900, Edwards joined the Savannah Volunteer Guards, Company B, Coast Artillery, and served as a sergeant in 1902 and 1903 and as a second lieutenant in the Oglethorpe Light Infantry of the First Georgia Regiment of Infantry in 1903 and 1904.

== Political career ==
In 1906, Edwards was elected to the 60th United States Congress as a Democratic member of the United States House of Representatives and served four additional terms in that seat until declining to run for re-election in 1916.

== Legal career and return to office ==
After his initial congressional service, Edwards returned to Savannah to practice law. He also served as president of the Savannah Board of Trade in 1919 and 1920, trustee of Southern Methodist College in McRae, Georgia, served on the Savannah Harbor Commission from 1920 until 1924 and was director of the Atlantic Deep Waterways Association.

=== Second stint in Congress ===
Edwards returned to the U.S. Congress as a Representative in the 69th Congress and served three additional terms until his 1931 death from a heart attack in Atlanta, Georgia while still in office.

He was buried in Savannah's Bonaventure Cemetery.

== See also ==
- List of members of the United States Congress who died in office (1900–1949)

U.S. House of Representatives
Preceded by James W. Overstreet	Member of the U.S. House of Representatives from Georgia's 1st congressional district March 4, 1907 – March 3, 1917	Succeeded by James W. Overstreet
Preceded by R. Lee Moore	Member of the U.S. House of Representatives from Georgia's 1st congressional district March 4, 1925 – July 13, 1931	Succeeded by Homer C. Parker
