= R. Lee Moore =

American politician

Robert Lee Moore (November 27, 1867 – January 14, 1940), also known as R. Lee Moore, was an American politician and lawyer from Georgia.

== Early years and education ==
Moore was born near Scarboro, Georgia, in Screven County. He attended Scarboro Academy, Georgia Military College in Milledgeville, Georgia, and Moore’s Business University in Atlanta, Georgia. He graduated in 1890 with a Bachelor of Laws (B.L.) from the UGA School of Law in Athens and was a member of Demosthenian Literary Society when he was a student. Moore gained admission to the state bar and began the practice of law in Statesboro, Georgia.

== Political service ==
From 1906 to 1907, Moore was the Mayor of Statesboro. He was the solicitor general of Georgia's middle judicial circuit from 1913 to 1916. Moore was elected in 1922 as a Democrat to represent Georgia's 1st congressional district in the United States House of Representatives for the 68th Congress. Moore won the election handily, with 5,579 votes. The second place candidate, a Republican, received 426 votes. The third place candidate, Don H. Clark, also running as a Republican, received 196 votes. Clark contested the outcome. In his notice of contest he "alleged various errors, frauds, and irregularities, including the burning of ballots, failure to open the polls, and conspiracy to prevent his name from appearing on the ballot". The matter was taken up by the United States House of Representatives, with the seat being affirmed for Moore.

== Later years ==
After unsuccessfully running for reelection to that seat in 1924, Moore returned to practicing law in Statesboro. He died there on January 14, 1940, and was buried in Eastside Cemetery in that same city.

U.S. House of Representatives
Preceded by James W. Overstreet	Member of the U.S. House of Representatives from Georgia's 1st congressional district March 4, 1923 – March 3, 1925	Succeeded by Charles Gordon Edwards
