= Daniel W. Lee =

Daniel W. Lee Sr.
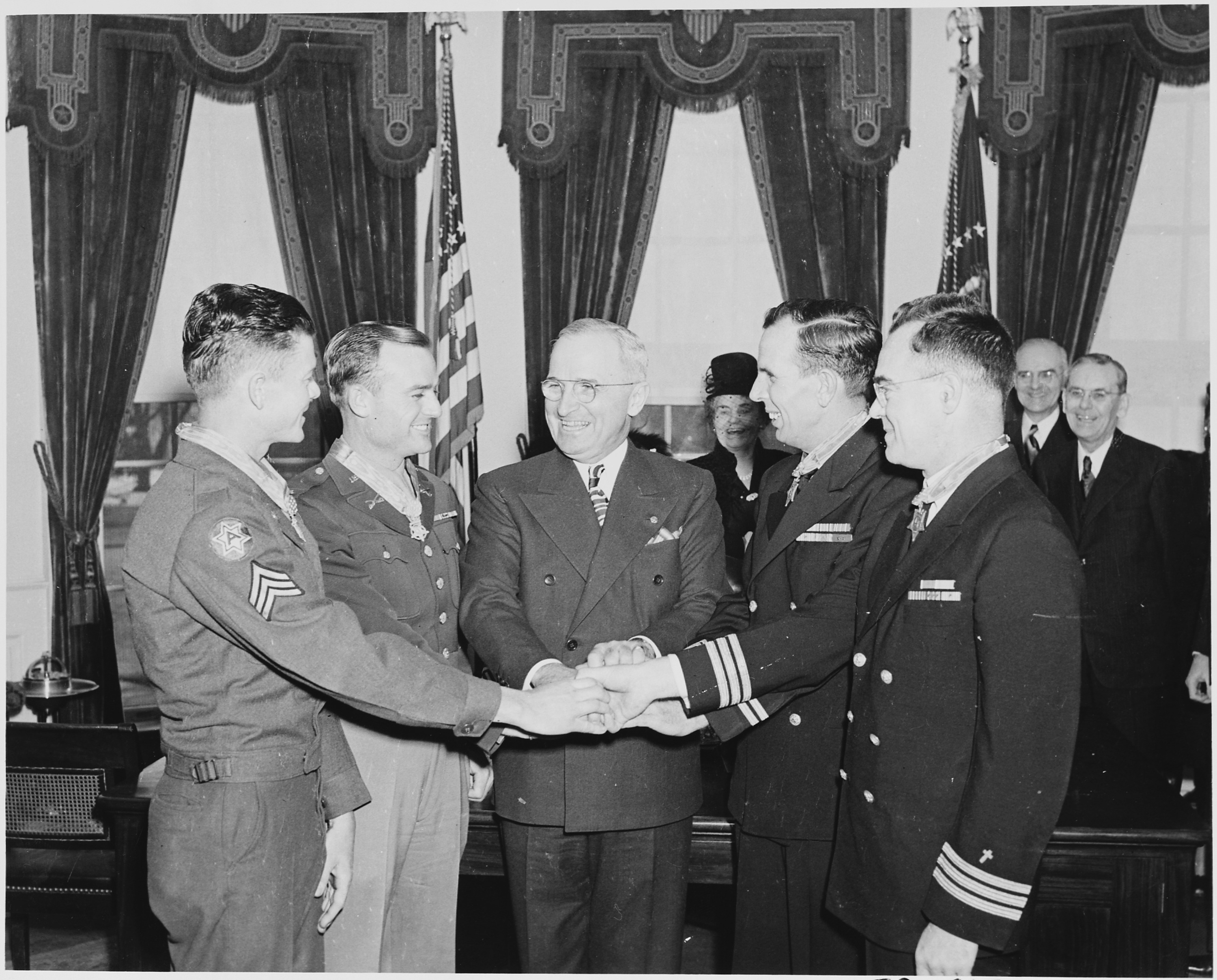
- Lee (second from left) with President Harry S. Truman (center) and other Medal of Honor recipients at their medal presentation ceremony.
- Born: June 23, 1919; Alma, Georgia, US
- Died: January 22, 1985 (aged 65); San Antonio, Texas, US
- Burial place: Rose Hill Cemetery Alma, Georgia
- Military career
- Allegiance: United States of America
- Branch: United States Army
- Rank: Captain
- Units: Troop A, 117th Cavalry Reconnaissance Squadron
- Conflicts: World War II; Korean War
- Awards: Medal of Honor

Daniel Warnel Lee Sr. (June 23, 1919 – January 22, 1985) was a United States Army officer and a recipient of the United States military's highest decoration—the Medal of Honor—for his actions in World War II.

== Biography ==
Lee joined the Army from his birthplace of Alma, Georgia in March 1942, and by September 2, 1944, was serving as a second lieutenant in Troop A, 117th Cavalry Reconnaissance Squadron. On that day, at Montrevel, France, he single-handedly attacked an enemy mortar position. Despite being seriously wounded in his approach, he successfully killed or drove off all of the German soldiers. Lee survived his wounds and was subsequently promoted to first lieutenant and, on January 23, 1946, awarded the Medal of Honor.

Lee reached the rank of captain and served in the Korean War before leaving the Army. He died at age 65 and was buried at Rose Hill Cemetery in his hometown of Alma, Georgia.

== Medal of Honor citation ==
Lee's official Medal of Honor citation reads:

1st Lt. (then 2d Lt.) Daniel W. Lee was leader of Headquarters Platoon, Troop A, 117th Cavalry Reconnaissance Squadron, Mechanized, at Montrevel, France, on September 2, 1944, when the Germans mounted a strong counterattack, isolating the town and engaging its outnumbered defenders in a pitched battle. After the fight had raged for hours and our forces had withstood heavy shelling and armor-supported infantry attacks, 2d Lt. Lee organized a patrol to knock out mortars which were inflicting heavy casualties on the beleaguered reconnaissance troops. He led the small group to the edge of the town, sweeping enemy riflemen out of position on a ridge from which he observed 7 Germans manning 2 large mortars near an armored half-track about 100 yards down the reverse slope. Armed with a rifle and grenades, he left his men on the high ground and crawled to within 30 yards of the mortars, where the enemy discovered him and unleashed machine-pistol fire which shattered his right thigh. Scorning retreat, bleeding and suffering intense pain, he dragged himself relentlessly forward. He killed 5 of the enemy with rifle fire and the others fled before he reached their position. Fired on by an armored car, he took cover behind the German half-track and there found a panzerfaust with which to neutralize this threat. Despite his wounds, he inched his way toward the car through withering machinegun fire, maneuvering into range, and blasted the vehicle with a round from the rocket launcher, forcing it to withdraw. Having cleared the slope of hostile troops, he struggle back to his men, where he collapsed from pain and loss of blood. 2d Lt. Lee's outstanding gallantry, willing risk of life, and extreme tenacity of purpose in coming to grips with the enemy, although suffering from grievous wounds, set an example of bravery and devotion to duty in keeping with the highest traditions of the military service.

== Awards and decorations ==

1st row	Medal of Honor	Purple Heart	American Campaign Medal
2nd row	European–African–Middle Eastern Campaign Medal with arrowhead and two campaign stars	World War II Victory Medal	National Defense Service Medal

== See also ==
- List of Medal of Honor recipients
- List of Medal of Honor recipients for World War II
