= Coffee, Georgia =

Coffee
- Unincorporated community
- Coffee
- Location within Georgia Location within the United States
- Coordinates: 31°30′28″N 82°18′41″W
- Country: United States
- State: Georgia
- County: Bacon

Coffee is an unincorporated community in Bacon County, Georgia, United States.

== History ==
A post office called Coffee was established in 1890, and remained in operation until 1957. The community was either named after a local pioneer citizen or after General John E. Coffee, a state legislator and a U. S. representative (sources vary).
