= Rockingham, Georgia =

- Unincorporated community Census-designated place
- Location within the state of Georgia
- Coordinates: 31°32′53″N 82°24′59″W
- Country: United States
- State: Georgia
- County: Bacon

Area
  - Total: 1.18 sq mi (3.05 km^{2})
  - Land: 1.17 sq mi (3.03 km^{2})
  - Water: 0.0077 sq mi (0.02 km^{2})
- Elevation: 194 ft (59 m)

Population (2020)
  - Total: 230
  - Density: 196.4/sq mi (75.82/km^{2})
- Time zone: UTC-5 (Eastern (EST))
  - Summer (DST): UTC-4 (EDT)
- FIPS code: 13-66220
- GNIS feature ID: 332889

Rockingham (also Sallie) is an unincorporated community and census-designated place (CDP) in central Bacon County, Georgia, United States. It lies along State Route 32 to the east of the city of Alma, the county seat of Bacon County. Its elevation is 194 feet (59 m). As of the 2020 census, its population was 230.

== History ==
A post office called Rockingham was established in 1902, and remained in operation until 1939. The community was named after Rockingham, North Carolina, the native home of a share of the first settlers.

== Demographics ==
Historical population
Census	Pop.	Note	%±
2010	248		—
2020	230		−7.3%
U.S. Decennial Census; 1850-1870 1870-1880; 1890-1910 1920-1930; 1940 1950 1960; 1970 1980 1990; 2000 2010 2020

Rockingham first appeared as a census designated place in the 2010 U.S. census.

Rockingham CDP, Georgia – Racial and ethnic composition Note: the US Census treats Hispanic/Latino as an ethnic category. This table excludes Latinos from the racial categories and assigns them to a separate category. Hispanics/Latinos may be of any race.
Race / Ethnicity (NH = Non-Hispanic)	Pop 2010	Pop 2020	% 2010	% 2020
White alone (NH)	181	177	72.98%	76.96%
Black or African American alone (NH)	34	13	13.71%	5.65%
Native American or Alaska Native alone (NH)	0	0	0.00%	0.00%
Asian alone (NH)	0	2	0.00%	0.87%
Pacific Islander alone (NH)	1	0	0.40%	0.00%
Other race alone (NH)	0	0	0.00%	0.00%
Mixed race or Multiracial (NH)	1	4	0.40%	1.74%
Hispanic or Latino (any race)	31	34	12.50%	14.78%
Total	248	230	100.00%	100.00%

In 2020, its population was 230, while at the 2010 census it had a population of 248.
