= Bacon County High School =

School in Georgia, United States

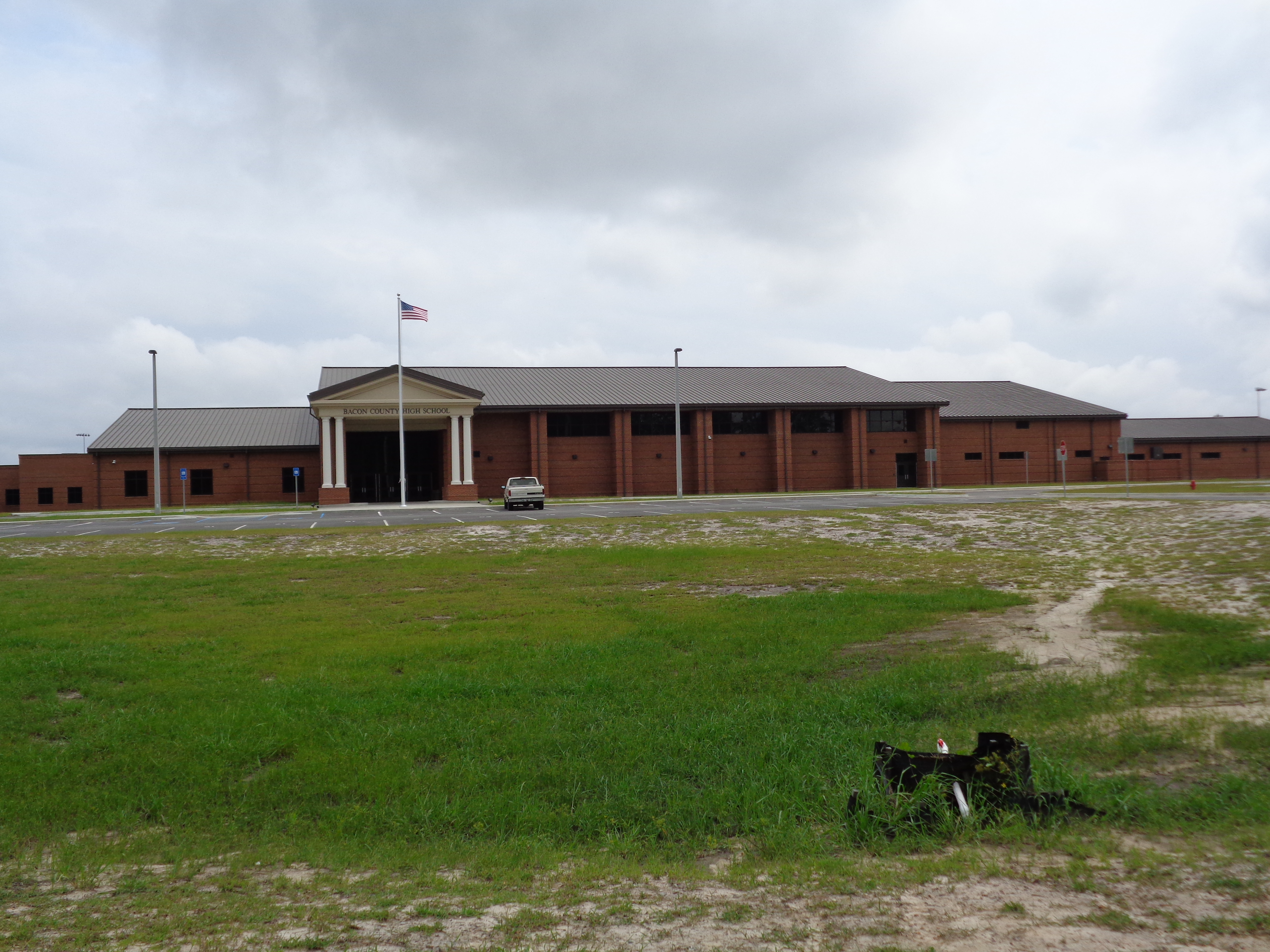

Location
- 1190 US Highway 1 South; Alma, Georgia 31510; United States
- Coordinates: 31°33′00″N 82°27′48″W

Information
- Type: High school
- School district: Bacon County School District
- CEEB code: 110055
- Principal: Charlie Powell
- Teaching staff: 44.20 (on an FTE basis)
- Grades: 9-12
- Enrollment: 636 (2023-2024)
- Student to teacher ratio: 14.39
- Colors: Red, black and white
- Nickname: Red Raiders
- Website: hs.bcraiders.com

Bacon County High School is located in the town of Alma in Bacon County, Georgia, United States. It is part of the Bacon County School District.

== Demographics ==
The demographic breakdown of the 613 students enrolled for the 2020–21 school year was:

- Girls - 46.2%
- Boys - 53.8%
- Asian - 0.5%
- Black - 19.9%
- Hispanic -13.6%
- White - 63.6%
- Multiracial - 2.4%

== Athletics and Activities ==
The Bacon County Red Raiders offer the following sports and activities:

- Baseball
- Basketball
- Cheerleading
- Wrestling
- Soccer
- Bass Fishing
- Cross country
- Football
- Golf
- Softball
- Tennis
- Track
- Drama
- BETA
- E-Sports
- FCCLA
- HOSA
- FCA
- CTAE
- Marching Band

=== Championships ===
- Baseball - 2004 AA State Champions

== Notable alumni ==
- Harry Crews, novelist, playwright, short story writer and essayist
