= Bacon County, Georgia =

County in Georgia, United States

- County
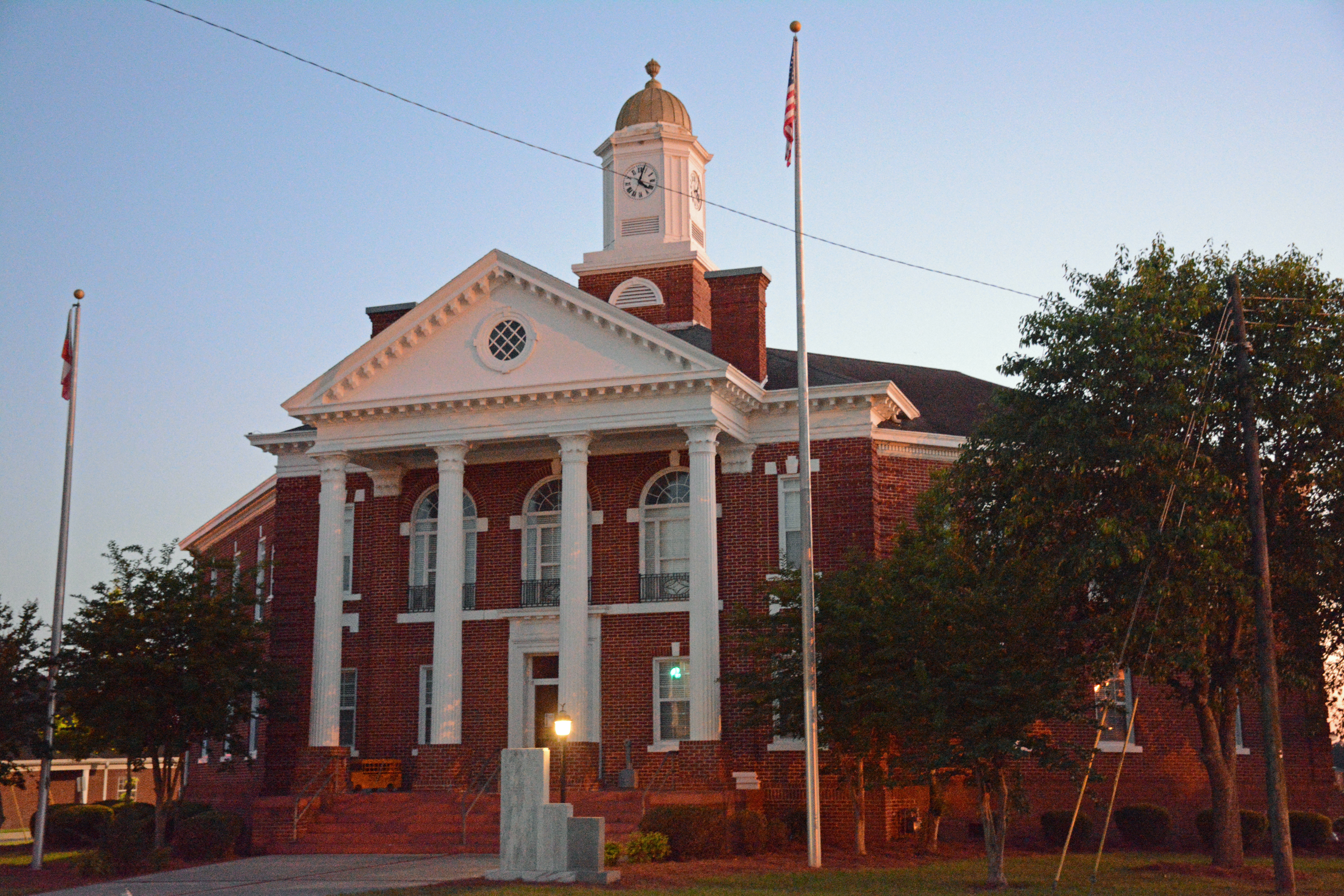
- Bacon County Courthouse in Alma

- Logo

- Location within the U.S. state of Georgia
- Coordinates: 31°34′N 82°27′W
- Country: United States
- State: Georgia
- Founded: July 27, 1914; 112 years ago
- Named for: Augustus Octavius Bacon
- Seat: Alma
- Largest city: Alma

Area
  - Total: 286 sq mi (740 km^{2})
  - Land: 259 sq mi (670 km^{2})
  - Water: 27 sq mi (70 km^{2}) 9.5%

Population (2020)
  - Total: 11,140
  - Estimate (2025): 11,070 ▼
  - Density: 43/sq mi (17/km^{2})
- Time zone: UTC−5 (Eastern)
  - Summer (DST): UTC−4 (EDT)
- Congressional district: 1st
- Website: https://baconcounty.org/

Bacon County is a county located in the southeastern part of the U.S. state of Georgia. As of the 2020 census, the population was 11,140. The county seat is Alma.

== History ==
The constitutional amendment to create the county was proposed July 7, 1914, and ratified November 3, 1914. It is named after Augustus Bacon, a former United States senator from Georgia.

== Geography ==
According to the U.S. Census Bureau, the county has a total area of 286 square miles (740 km^{2}), of which 259 square miles (670 km^{2}) are land and 27 square miles (70 km^{2}) (9.5%) are covered by water.

The majority and western portion of Bacon County is located in the Satilla River sub-basin of the St. Marys River-Satilla River basin. The entire eastern and half of the southeastern edge of the county is located in the Little Satilla River sub-basin of the same St. Marys-Satilla River basin. The county forms part of Southeast Georgia.

=== Major highways ===
- U.S. Route 1 / Georgia State Route 4
  - State Route 4 Alternate
- U.S. Route 23
- State Route 19
- State Route 32
- State Route 203

=== Adjacent counties ===
- Appling County (northeast)
- Pierce County (southeast)
- Ware County (south)
- Coffee County (west)
- Jeff Davis County (northwest)

=== Communities ===
==== City ====
- Alma (county seat)

==== Census-designated place ====
- Rockingham

==== Unincorporated communities ====
- Coffee
- Sessoms

== Demographics ==
Historical population
Census	Pop.	Note	%±
1920	6,460		—
1930	7,055		9.2%
1940	8,096		14.8%
1950	8,940		10.4%
1960	8,359		−6.5%
1970	8,233		−1.5%
1980	9,379		13.9%
1990	9,566		2.0%
2000	10,103		5.6%
2010	11,096		9.8%
2020	11,140		0.4%
2025 (est.)	11,070	▼	−0.6%
U.S. Decennial Census; 1790-1880 1890-1910; 1920-1930 1930-1940; 1940-1950 1960-1980; 1980-2000 2010

=== Racial and ethnic composition ===
Bacon County, Georgia – Racial and ethnic composition Note: the US Census treats Hispanic/Latino as an ethnic category. This table excludes Latinos from the racial categories and assigns them to a separate category. Hispanics/Latinos may be of any race.
Race / Ethnicity (NH = Non-Hispanic)	Pop 1980	Pop 1990	Pop 2000	Pop 2010	Pop 2020	% 1980	% 1990	% 2000	% 2010	% 2020
White alone (NH)	7,917	7,992	8,068	8,431	8,103	84.41%	83.55%	79.86%	75.98%	72.74%
Black or African American alone (NH)	1,391	1,469	1,562	1,696	1,747	14.83%	15.36%	15.46%	15.28%	15.68%
Native American or Alaska Native alone (NH)	10	6	14	8	4	0.11%	0.06%	0.14%	0.07%	0.04%
Asian alone (NH)	4	13	28	34	40	0.04%	0.14%	0.28%	0.31%	0.36%
Native Hawaiian or Pacific Islander alone (NH)	x	x	0	10	4	x	x	0.00%	0.09%	0.04%
Other race alone (NH)	5	3	7	6	32	0.05%	0.03%	0.07%	0.05%	0.29%
Mixed race or Multiracial (NH)	x	x	82	120	335	x	x	0.81%	1.08%	3.01%
Hispanic or Latino (any race)	52	83	342	791	875	0.55%	0.87%	3.39%	7.13%	7.85%
Total	9,379	9,566	10,103	11,096	11,140	100.00%	100.00%	100.00%	100.00%	100.00%

According to the 1920 United States census, the county had a population of 6,460 which has increased since every decennial census except from 1960 and 1970; in 1960, its population declined from 8,940 to 8,359; and in 1970, its population declined to 8,233.

=== 2020 census ===
As of the 2020 census, the county had a population of 11,140. Of the residents, 25.4% were under the age of 18 and 17.3% were 65 years of age or older; the median age was 38.6 years. For every 100 females there were 97.9 males, and for every 100 females age 18 and over there were 95.0 males. 0.0% of residents lived in urban areas and 100.0% lived in rural areas.

The racial makeup of the county was 74.1% White, 15.8% Black or African American, 0.1% American Indian and Alaska Native, 0.4% Asian, 0.0% Native Hawaiian and Pacific Islander, 5.1% from some other race, and 4.5% from two or more races. Hispanic or Latino residents of any race comprised 7.9% of the population.

There were 4,251 households in the county, of which 34.6% had children under the age of 18 living with them and 30.1% had a female householder with no spouse or partner present. About 25.8% of all households were made up of individuals and 11.4% had someone living alone who was 65 years of age or older.

There were 4,807 housing units, of which 11.6% were vacant. Among occupied housing units, 68.3% were owner-occupied and 31.7% were renter-occupied. The homeowner vacancy rate was 0.8% and the rental vacancy rate was 8.6%.

The 2022 American Community Survey estimated its racial and ethnic composition was 73% White, 15% African American, 1% Asian, 3% multiracial, and 9% Hispanic or Latino of any race.

In 2022, the median household income for the county was $43,938 with a per capita income of $24,654. An estimated 21.6% of the county population lived at or below the poverty line. With an estimated 4,807 housing units in the county, 72% were owner-occupied and the median value of an owner-occupied housing unit was $95,600. Approximately 53% of housing units were valued under $100,000.

Religiously, as of 2020, the Association of Religion Data Archives determined the Southern Baptist Convention was the county's largest religious group, being within the Bible Belt. The Church of God (Cleveland, Tennessee) was the second-largest Christian denomination in the county, followed by the Church of Jesus Christ of Latter-day Saints and National Association of Free Will Baptists. Among the county's predominantly Christian population, Methodists, Holiness, and Pentecostal Christians formed the remainder of its religious landscape.

== Politics ==
United States presidential election results for Bacon County, Georgia
Year	Republican		Democratic		Third party(ies)	
Year	No.	%	No.	%	No.	%
1916	0	0.00%	287	86.19%	46	13.81%
1920	219	41.63%	307	58.37%	0	0.00%
1924	79	7.49%	961	91.09%	15	1.42%
1928	203	39.96%	305	60.04%	0	0.00%
1932	11	2.08%	515	97.54%	2	0.38%
1936	62	6.26%	929	93.74%	0	0.00%
1940	97	10.51%	821	88.95%	5	0.54%
1944	220	22.38%	763	77.62%	0	0.00%
1948	104	8.42%	785	63.56%	346	28.02%
1952	543	26.42%	1,512	73.58%	0	0.00%
1956	394	13.88%	2,445	86.12%	0	0.00%
1960	579	33.14%	1,168	66.86%	0	0.00%
1964	2,136	64.43%	1,179	35.57%	0	0.00%
1968	586	20.93%	279	9.96%	1,935	69.11%
1972	1,771	90.22%	192	9.78%	0	0.00%
1976	594	19.87%	2,395	80.13%	0	0.00%
1980	1,427	45.94%	1,622	52.22%	57	1.84%
1984	1,778	63.77%	1,010	36.23%	0	0.00%
1988	1,407	64.13%	780	35.55%	7	0.32%
1992	1,301	39.01%	1,423	42.67%	611	18.32%
1996	1,580	47.07%	1,360	40.51%	417	12.42%
2000	2,010	67.11%	956	31.92%	29	0.97%
2004	2,853	75.24%	930	24.53%	9	0.24%
2008	3,089	78.36%	817	20.73%	36	0.91%
2012	3,093	78.58%	791	20.10%	52	1.32%
2016	3,364	83.49%	608	15.09%	57	1.41%
2020	4,017	86.07%	625	13.39%	25	0.54%
2024	4,186	86.51%	645	13.33%	8	0.17%

United States Senate election results for Bacon County, Georgia2
Year	Republican		Democratic		Third party(ies)	
Year	No.	%	No.	%	No.	%
2020	3,929	85.60%	591	12.88%	70	1.53%
2020	3,569	86.46%	559	13.54%	0	0.00%

United States Senate election results for Bacon County, Georgia3
Year	Republican		Democratic		Third party(ies)	
Year	No.	%	No.	%	No.	%
2020	1,646	36.48%	315	6.98%	2,551	56.54%
2020	3,572	86.47%	559	13.53%	0	0.00%
2022	3,204	86.36%	458	12.35%	48	1.29%
2022	3,047	87.36%	441	12.64%	0	0.00%

Georgia Gubernatorial election results for Bacon County
Year	Republican		Democratic		Third party(ies)	
Year	No.	%	No.	%	No.	%
2022	3,312	89.01%	393	10.56%	16	0.43%

As of the 2020s, Bacon County is a Republican stronghold, voting 86.51% for Donald Trump in 2024. For elections to the United States House of Representatives, Bacon County is part of Georgia's 1st congressional district, currently represented by Buddy Carter. For elections to the Georgia State Senate, Bacon County is part of District 19. For elections to the Georgia House of Representatives, Bacon County is part of District 178.

== See also ==
- Bacon County Courthouse
- National Register of Historic Places listings in Bacon County, Georgia
- Bacon County High School
- List of counties in Georgia
