= Alma, Georgia =

- City
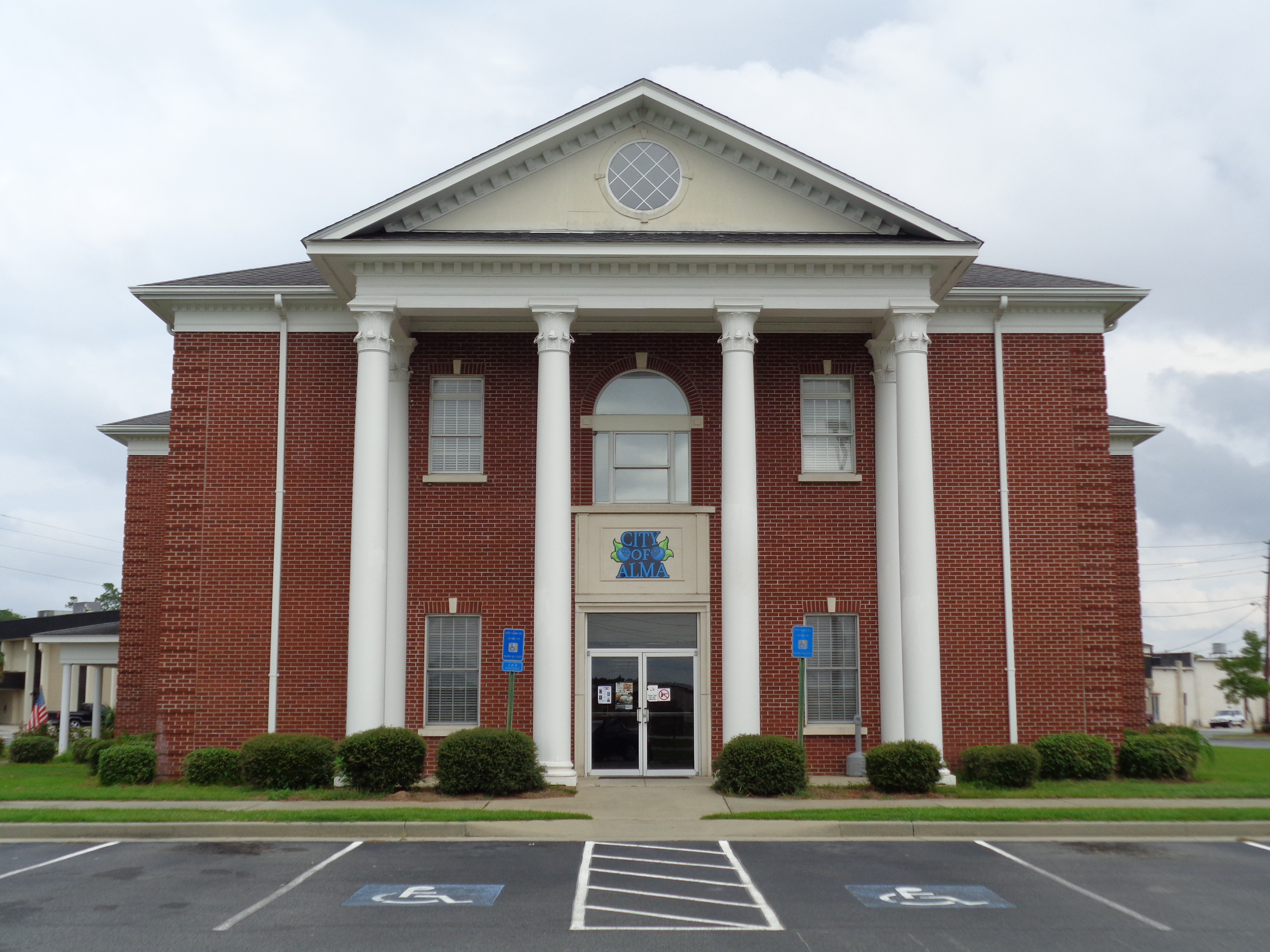
- Alma City services in Bacon County Courthouse

- Logo
- Nickname: "Georgia's Blueberry Capital"
- Location in Bacon County and the state of Georgia
- Coordinates: 31°32′30″N 82°28′0″W
- Country: United States
- State: Georgia
- County: Bacon

Government
  - Mayor: Larry Taylor

Area
  - Total: 6.22 sq mi (16.11 km^{2})
  - Land: 6.09 sq mi (15.78 km^{2})
  - Water: 0.13 sq mi (0.33 km^{2})
- Elevation: 200 ft (61 m)

Population (2020)
  - Total: 3,433
  - Density: 563.5/sq mi (217.57/km^{2})
- Time zone: UTC-5 (Eastern (EST))
  - Summer (DST): UTC-4 (EDT)
- ZIP code: 31510
- Area code: 912
- FIPS code: 13-01612
- GNIS feature ID: 0310492
- Website: www.cityofalmaga.gov

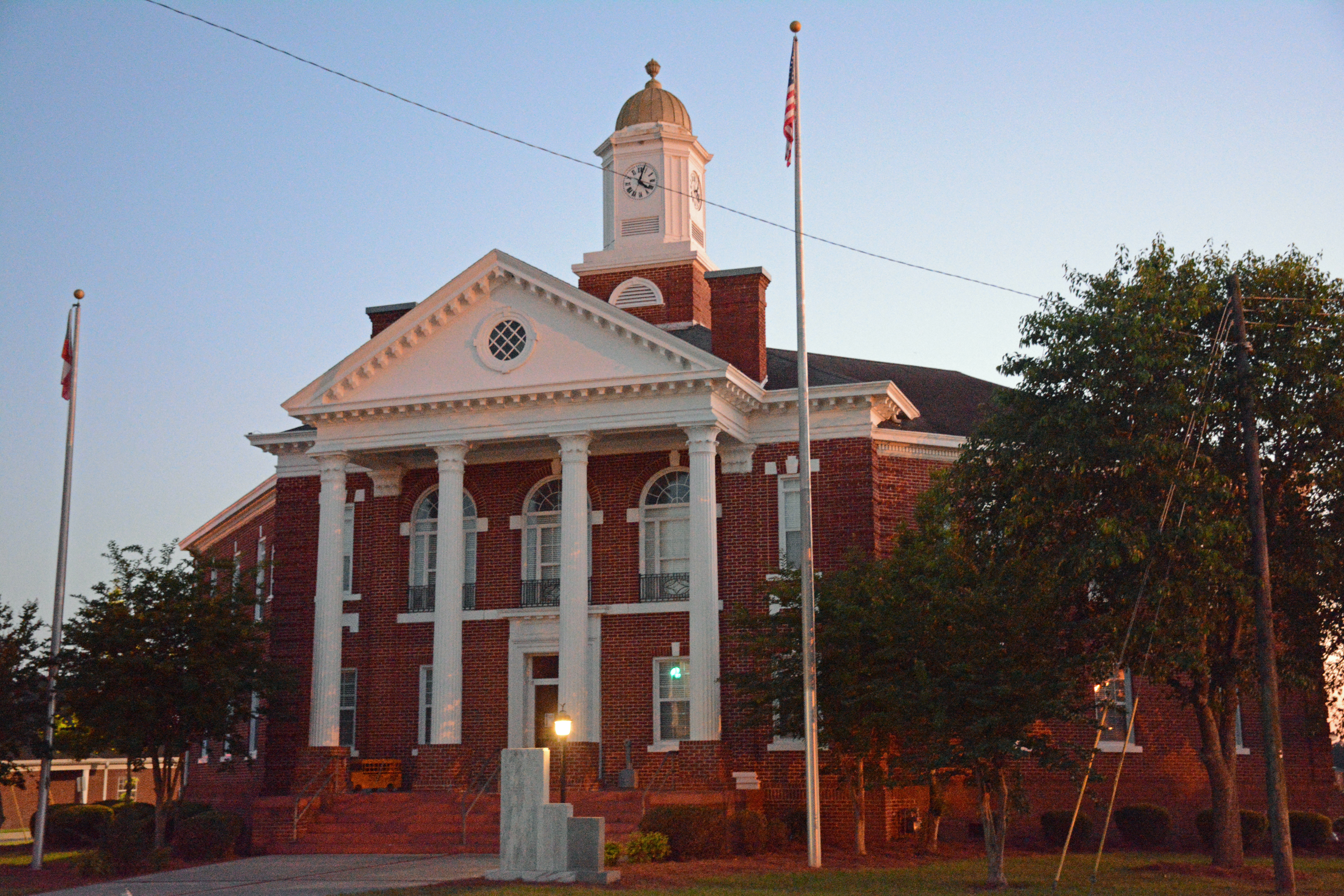
Bacon County Courthouse

Alma is a city in and the county seat of Bacon County, Georgia, United States. As of the 2020 census, the city had a population of 3,433.

Alma is known as Georgia's blueberry capital, and hosts a Blueberry Festival each June.

== History ==
Alma was founded in 1900 as a stop on the Atlantic Coast Line Railroad. It was incorporated as a city in 1906 and designated seat of the newly formed Bacon County in 1914.

There are two theories about the origin of the name of the town. The first is that it was named for the wife of a traveling salesmen, Alma Sheridan; the other is that it was named for the initial letter of the four state capitals Georgia has had: Augusta, Louisville, Milledgeville, and Atlanta.

There are four sites in Alma listed on the National Register of Historic Places: Alma Depot, Bacon County Courthouse, Bacon County School, and the Rabinowitz Building.

== Geography ==
Alma is located in southeastern Georgia at 31°32′30″N 82°28′0″W (31.541543, -82.466666).

The city is located along U.S. Routes 1 and 23 (Pierce Street). The two run through the center of the city together before splitting just north of the city. U.S. 1 connects the city with Baxley, 19 mi (31 km) to the north, and U.S. 23 connects the city with Hazlehurst, 25 mi (40 km) to the northwest. U.S. 1/23 also runs south 29 mi (47 km) to Waycross. Other highways that run through the city include Georgia State Routes 32 (16th Street) and 64 (Market Street).

According to the United States Census Bureau, the city has a total area of 6.2 square miles (16.1 km^{2}), of which 5.5 square miles (14.3 km^{2}) is land and 0.69 square miles (1.8 km^{2}), or 11.27%, is water.

=== Climate ===
Alma has a humid subtropical climate (Köppen: Cfa) with long, hot summers and short, mild winters.

Climate data for Alma (Bacon County Airport) (normals 1991–2020, extremes 1938–present)
Month	Jan	Feb	Mar	Apr	May	Jun	Jul	Aug	Sep	Oct	Nov	Dec	Year
Record high °F (°C)	83 (28)	87 (31)	91 (33)	96 (36)	101 (38)	105 (41)	104 (40)	105 (41)	101 (38)	97 (36)	89 (32)	83 (28)	105 (41)
Mean maximum °F (°C)	78.0 (25.6)	80.4 (26.9)	84.6 (29.2)	89.0 (31.7)	93.8 (34.3)	97.0 (36.1)	98.3 (36.8)	97.6 (36.4)	94.4 (34.7)	89.2 (31.8)	83.5 (28.6)	78.9 (26.1)	99.2 (37.3)
Mean daily maximum °F (°C)	62.6 (17.0)	66.5 (19.2)	72.8 (22.7)	79.7 (26.5)	86.6 (30.3)	91.0 (32.8)	93.2 (34.0)	92.0 (33.3)	87.9 (31.1)	80.3 (26.8)	71.5 (21.9)	64.7 (18.2)	79.1 (26.1)
Daily mean °F (°C)	51.0 (10.6)	54.4 (12.4)	60.2 (15.7)	66.5 (19.2)	74.2 (23.4)	80.0 (26.7)	82.4 (28.0)	81.7 (27.6)	77.5 (25.3)	68.7 (20.4)	59.0 (15.0)	53.2 (11.8)	67.4 (19.7)
Mean daily minimum °F (°C)	39.3 (4.1)	42.3 (5.7)	47.5 (8.6)	53.3 (11.8)	61.7 (16.5)	69.0 (20.6)	71.6 (22.0)	71.5 (21.9)	67.1 (19.5)	57.0 (13.9)	46.5 (8.1)	41.7 (5.4)	55.7 (13.2)
Mean minimum °F (°C)	23.3 (−4.8)	26.4 (−3.1)	30.7 (−0.7)	39.0 (3.9)	48.5 (9.2)	60.8 (16.0)	66.2 (19.0)	65.0 (18.3)	55.9 (13.3)	40.6 (4.8)	30.5 (−0.8)	26.6 (−3.0)	21.2 (−6.0)
Record low °F (°C)	−1 (−18)	13 (−11)	18 (−8)	30 (−1)	40 (4)	47 (8)	56 (13)	57 (14)	40 (4)	26 (−3)	15 (−9)	7 (−14)	−1 (−18)
Average precipitation inches (mm)	3.72 (94)	3.37 (86)	4.17 (106)	2.85 (72)	2.78 (71)	5.34 (136)	5.23 (133)	5.37 (136)	3.80 (97)	2.93 (74)	2.21 (56)	3.03 (77)	44.8 (1,138)
Average snowfall inches (cm)	0.1 (0.25)	0.0 (0.0)	0.0 (0.0)	0.0 (0.0)	0.0 (0.0)	0.0 (0.0)	0.0 (0.0)	0.0 (0.0)	0.0 (0.0)	0.0 (0.0)	0.0 (0.0)	0.0 (0.0)	0.1 (0.25)
Average precipitation days (≥ 0.1 in)	5.7	5.2	5.5	4.4	4.5	8.5	8.0	7.8	5.8	3.8	3.8	4.9	67.9
Average snowy days (≥ 0.1 in)	0.1	0.0	0.0	0.0	0.0	0.0	0.0	0.0	0.0	0.0	0.0	0.0	0.1
Source: NOAA

== Demographics ==
Historical population
Census	Pop.	Note	%±
1910	458		—
1920	1,061		131.7%
1930	1,235		16.4%
1940	1,840		49.0%
1950	2,588		40.7%
1960	3,515		35.8%
1970	3,756		6.9%
1980	3,819		1.7%
1990	3,663		−4.1%
2000	3,236		−11.7%
2010	3,466		7.1%
2020	3,433		−1.0%
U.S. Decennial Census; 1850-1870 1880; 1890-1910 1920-1930; 1930-1940 1940-1950; 1960-1980 1980-2000

=== 2020 census ===
As of the 2020 census, Alma had a population of 3,433. The median age was 36.7 years. 27.2% of residents were under the age of 18 and 16.8% of residents were 65 years of age or older. For every 100 females there were 94.0 males, and for every 100 females age 18 and over there were 90.7 males age 18 and over.

Alma racial composition as of 2020
Race	Number	Percentage
White (non-Hispanic)	1,599	46.58%
Black or African American (non-Hispanic)	1,455	42.38%
Native American	2	0.06%
Asian	25	0.73%
Pacific Islander	3	0.09%
Other/mixed	105	3.06%
Hispanic or Latino	244	7.11%

0.0% of residents lived in urban areas, while 100.0% lived in rural areas.

There were 1,266 households in Alma, including 620 families. Of all households, 38.1% had children under the age of 18 living in them, 31.5% were married-couple households, 16.9% were households with a male householder and no spouse or partner present, and 44.9% were households with a female householder and no spouse or partner present. About 29.3% of all households were made up of individuals and 12.2% had someone living alone who was 65 years of age or older.

There were 1,445 housing units, of which 12.4% were vacant. The homeowner vacancy rate was 0.5% and the rental vacancy rate was 10.7%.

== Education ==
Alma is served by the Bacon County School District. The district has 126 full-time teachers and over 1,900 students, and operates these schools:

- Bacon County Elementary School
- Bacon County Primary School
- Bacon County Middle School
- Bacon County High School

Alma is also served by Coastal Pines Technical College.

== Notable people ==
- Harry Crews, novelist, playwright, short story writer and essayist
- Braswell Deen, U.S. representative from Georgia; moved to Alma
- Daniel W. Lee, recipient of Congressional Medal of Honor
- Walter J. Leonard, former president of Fisk University
- William M. Wheeler, U.S. representative from Georgia

== See also ==
- National Register of Historic Places listings in Bacon County, Georgia
