= Evolution of snake venom =

Origin and diversification of snake venom through geologic time

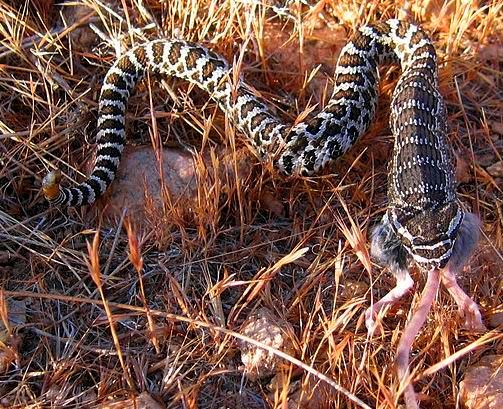
The rattlesnake Crotalus oreganus eating its prey, which it uses its venom to subdue

Venom in snakes and some lizards is a form of saliva that has been modified into venom over its evolutionary history. In snakes, venom has evolved to kill or subdue prey, as well as to perform other diet-related functions. While snakes occasionally use their venom in self defense, this is not believed to have had a strong effect on venom evolution. The evolution of venom is thought to be responsible for the enormous expansion of snakes across the globe.

The evolutionary history of snake venom is a matter of debate. Historically, snake venom was believed to have evolved once, at the base of the Caenophidia, or derived snakes. Molecular studies published beginning in 2006 suggested that venom originated just once among a putative clade of reptiles, called Toxicofera, approximately 170 million years ago. Under this hypothesis, the original toxicoferan venom was a very simple set of proteins that were assembled in a pair of glands. Subsequently, this set of proteins diversified in the various lineages of toxicoferans, including Serpentes, Anguimorpha, and Iguania: several snake lineages also lost the ability to produce venom. The Toxicoferan hypothesis was challenged by studies in the mid-2010s, including a 2015 study which found that venom proteins had homologs in many other tissues in the Burmese python. The study therefore suggested that venom had evolved independently in different reptile lineages, including once in the Caenophid snakes. Venom containing most extant toxin families is believed to have been present in the last common ancestor of the Caenophidia: these toxins subsequently underwent tremendous diversification, accompanied by changes in the morphology of venom glands and delivery systems.

Snake venom evolution is thought to be driven by an evolutionary arms race between venom proteins and prey physiology. The common mechanism of evolution is thought to be gene duplication followed by natural selection for adaptive traits. The adaptations produced by this process include venom more toxic to specific prey in several lineages, proteins that pre-digest prey, and a method to track down prey after a bite. These various adaptations of venom have also led to considerable debate about the definition of venom and venomous snakes. Changes in the diet of a lineage have been linked to atrophication of the venom.

== Evolutionary history ==
The origin of venom is thought to have provided the catalyst for the rapid diversification of snakes in the Cenozoic period, particularly to the Colubridae and their colonization of the Americas. Scholars suggest that the reason for this huge expansion was the shift from a mechanical to a biochemical method of subduing prey. Snake venoms attack biological pathways and processes that are also targeted by venoms of other taxa; for instance, calcium channel blockers have been found in snakes, spiders, and cone snails, thus suggesting that venom exhibits convergent evolution. Venom is common among derived snake families. Venom containing most extant toxin families is believed to have been present in the last common ancestor of the Caenophidia, also called Colubroidea. These toxins subsequently underwent tremendous diversification, accompanied by changes in the morphology of venom glands and delivery systems. This diversification is linked to the rapid global radiation of the advanced snakes. The tubular or grooved fangs snakes use to deliver their venom to their target have evolved multiple times, and are an example of convergent evolution. The tubular fangs common to front-fanged snakes are believed to have evolved independently in Viperidae, Elapidae, and Atractaspidinae.

- Serpentes
  - Scolecophidia
  - - Booidea inc. Pythonidae
    - Caenophidia
      - Acrochordidae
      - - Xenodermatidae
        - Colubroidea
          - Pareatidae
          - [A]
            - [B]
              Viperidae
            - [C]
              - Homalopsidae
              - - Colubridae
                - - Lamprophiidae
                  - Elapidae

A cladogram adapted from Fry et al. (2012) showing a subset of suggested protein recruitment events. [A]: 13 toxin families, including 3FTx and metalloprotease. [B]: 2 toxin families, including PLA2 Type IIA and the P-II class of snake venom metalloproteases [C]: 2 toxin families, including PLA2 Type IB.

Until the use of gene sequencing to create phylogenetic trees became practical, phylogenies were created on the basis of morphology. Such traditional phylogenies suggested that venom originated along multiple branches among Squamata approximately 100 million years ago: in the Caenophidia, or derived snakes, and in the lizard genus Heloderma. Studies using nuclear gene sequences in the mid-2000s and early 2010s found the presence of venom proteins in the lizard clades Anguimorpha and Iguania similar to those of snakes, and suggested that together with Serpentes, these formed a clade, which they named "Toxicofera". This led to the theory that venom originated only once within the entire lineage approximately 170 million years ago. This ancestral venom was described as consisting of a very simple set of proteins, assembled in a pair of glands. The venoms of the different lineages then diversified and evolved independently, along with their means of injecting venom into prey. This diversification included the independent evolution of front-fanged venom delivery from the ancestral rear-fanged venom delivery system. The single origin hypothesis also suggests that venom systems subsequently atrophied, or were completely lost, independently in a number of lineages. The phylogenetic position of Iguania within Toxicofera is supported by most molecular studies, but not by morphological ones.

The "Toxicoferan hypothesis" was subsequently challenged. A study performed in 2014 found that homologs of 16 venom proteins, which had been used to support the single origin hypothesis, were all expressed at high levels in a number of body tissues. The authors therefore suggested that previous research, which had found venom proteins to be conserved across the supposed Toxicoferan lineage, might have misinterpreted the presence of more generic "housekeeping" genes across this lineage, as a result of only sampling certain tissues within the reptiles' bodies. Therefore, the authors suggested that instead of evolving just once in an ancestral reptile, venom evolved independently in multiple lineages, including once prior to the radiation of the "advanced" snakes. A 2015 study found that homologs of the so-called "toxic" genes were present in numerous tissues of a non-venomous snake, the Burmese python. One of the authors stated that they had found homologs to the venom genes in many tissues outside the oral glands, where venom genes might be expected. This demonstrated the weaknesses of only analyzing transcriptomes (the total messenger RNA in a cell). The team suggested that pythons represented a period in snake evolution before major venom development. The researchers also found that the expansion of venom gene families occurred mostly in highly venomous caenophidian snakes (also referred to as "colubrid snakes"), thus suggesting that most venom evolution took place after this lineage diverged from other snakes. The debate over the Toxicoferan hypothesis is driven in part by disagreement over the definition of a venom. As of 2022, the Toxicoferan hypothesis remains a prevalent view. A proposed resolution to this debate described venom as a system assembled incrementally through gradual recruitment and elaboration of pre-existing proteins, rather than not an all-or-nothing trait that either evolved once or multiple times. Zancolli and Casewell argued that some venom components are ancient and broadly shared across squamates, whereas more elaborate features such as front-fanged delivery systems evolved more recently and independently, built upon pre-existing secretory infrastructure. This ancestral recruitment model is supported by findings that major toxin families predated the main radiations of advanced snakes, suggesting that the diversity of venom seen today reflects the retention, loss, and modification of an ancestral molecular toolkit rather than repeated independent invention.

== Mechanisms of evolution ==
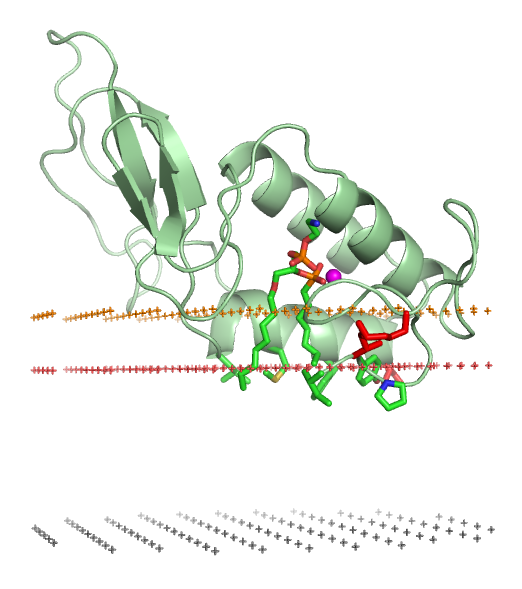
Phospholipase A2, an enzyme found in normal tissue that has been adapted in certain snake venoms. The example pictured here is found in bee stings.

The primary mechanism for the diversification of venom is thought to be the duplication of gene coding for other tissues, followed by their expression in the venom glands. The proteins then evolved into various venom proteins through natural selection. This process, known as the birth-and-death model, is responsible for several of the protein recruitment events in snake venom. These duplications occurred in a variety of tissue types with a number of ancestral functions. Notable examples include 3FTx, ancestrally a neurotransmitter found in the brain, which has adapted into a neurotoxin that binds and blocks acetylcholine receptors. Another example is phospholipase A2 (PLA2) type IIA, ancestrally involved with inflammatory processes in normal tissue, which has evolved into venom capable of triggering lipase activity and tissue destruction. The change in function of PLA2, in particular, has been well documented; there is evidence of several separate gene duplication events, often associated with the origin of new snake species. Non-allelic homologous recombination induced by transposon invasion (or recombination between DNA sequences that are similar, but not alleles) has been proposed as the mechanism of duplication of PLA2 genes in rattlesnakes, as an explanation for its rapid evolution. These venom proteins have also occasionally been recruited back into tissue genes.

Gene duplication is not the only way that venom has become more diverse. There have been instances of new venom proteins generated by alternative splicing. The Elapid snake Bungarus fasciatus, for example, possesses a gene that is alternatively spliced to yield both a venom component and a physiological protein. Sunagar and Moran proposed a two-speed model of venom evolution in which recently recruited venom genes experience rapid positive selection, while ancient toxin families undergo purifying selection that preserves their core function. Further diversification may have occurred by gene loss of specific venom components. For instance, the rattlesnake ancestor is believed to have had the PLA2 genes for a heterodimeric neurotoxin now found in Crotalus scutulatus, but those genes are absent in modern non-neurotoxic Crotalus species; the PLA2 genes for the Lys49-myotoxin supposedly existing in the common ancestor of rattlesnakes were also lost several times on recent lineages to extant species Domain loss has also been implicated in venom neofunctionalization. Investigation of the evolutionary history of viperid SVMP venom genes revealed repeated occasions of domain loss, coupled with significant positive selection in most of the phylogenetic branches where domain loss was thought to have occurred. The three structural classes of snake venom metalloproteinases differ in their retained non-catalytic domains, with each successive domain loss reducing functional constraints and accelerating evolution. Closely related rattlesnake species show differential retention of these classes, with Red Diamond rattlesnakes (Crotalus ruber) possessing all three and Southern Pacific rattlesnakes (Crotalus oreganus helleri) lacking two. Venom toxins have also evolved via the gene "hijacking" or "co-opting", or the change in function of unrelated genes. A 2021 study suggested that co-opting explained the evolution of most types of toxins, but not that of the toxins that are most abundant in snake venom.

Protein recruitment events have occurred at different points in the evolutionary history of snakes. For example, the 3FTX protein family is absent in the viperid lineage, suggesting that it was recruited into snake venom after the viperid snakes branched off from the remaining colubroidae. PLA2 is thought to have been recruited at least two separate times into snake venom, once in elapids and once in viperids, displaying convergent evolution of this protein into a toxin. A 2019 study suggested that gene duplication could have allowed different toxins to evolve independently, allowing snakes to experiment with their venom profiles and explore new and effective venom formulations. This was proposed as one of the ways snakes have diversified their venom formulations through millions of years of evolution. The various recruitment events had resulted in snake venom evolving into a very complex mixture of proteins. The venom of rattlesnakes, for example, includes nearly 40 different proteins from different protein families, and other snake venoms have been found to contain more than 100 distinct proteins. The composition of this mixture has been shown to vary geographically, and to be related to the prey species available in a certain region. Finding that diet predicted venom composition more accurately than geographic or climatic variables, with biochemically distinct profiles emerging in lizard-eating versus rodent-eating populations. Snake venom has generally evolved very quickly, with changes occurring faster in the venom than in the rest of the organism.

== Selection pressure ==
Long-standing hypotheses of snake venom evolution have assumed that most snakes inject far more venom into their prey than is required to kill them; thus, venom composition would not be subject to natural selection. This is known as the "overkill" hypothesis. However, recent studies of the molecular history of snake venom have contradicted this, instead finding evidence of rapid adaptive evolution in many different clades, including the carpet vipers, Echis, the ground rattlesnakes, Sistrurus, and the Malayan pit viper, as well as generally in the diversification of PLA2 proteins. There is phylogenetic evidence of positive selection and rapid rates of gene gain and loss in venom genes of Sistrurus taxa feeding on different prey. As of 2019, evidence existed both of "overkill" occurring in some lineages, and rapid adaptive evolution, and an evolutionary arms race with prey physiology, in many others.

The genes that code for venom proteins in some snake genera have a proportion of synonymous mutations that is lower than would be expected if venom were evolving through neutral evolutionary processes; the non-synonymous mutation rate, however, was found higher in many cases, indicating directional selection. In addition, snake venom is metabolically costly for a snake to produce, which scientists have suggested as further evidence that a selection pressure exists on snake venom (in this case, to minimize the volume of venom required). The use of model organisms, rather than snakes' natural prey, to study prey toxicity, has been suggested as a reason why the "overkill" hypothesis may have been overemphasized. However, the pitviper genus Agkistrodon has been found to be an exception to this; the composition of venom in Agkistrodon has been found to be related to the position of the species within the phylogeny, suggesting that those venoms have evolved mostly through neutral processes (mutation and genetic drift), and that there may be significant variation in the selection pressure upon various snake venoms.

Several studies have found evidence that venom and resistance to venom in prey species have evolved in a coevolutionary arms race. For example, wood rats of the genus Neotoma have a high degree of resistance to the venom of rattlesnakes, suggesting that the rats have evolved in response to the snake venom, thus renewing selection pressure upon the snakes. Resistance to venoms of sympatric predatory snake species has been found in eels, ground squirrels, rock squirrels, and Eastern gray squirrels. All these studies suggested a co-evolutionary arms race between prey and predator, indicating another potential selection pressure on snake venom to increase or innovate toxicity. The selection pressure on snake venom is thought to be selecting for functional diversity within the proteins in venom, both within a given species, and across species. In addition to prey physiology, evidence exists that snake venom has evolved in response to the physiology of predators.

Besides diet, there are other possible pressures on snake venom composition. A 2019 study found that larger body mass and smaller ecological habitats were correlated with increased venom yield. Another study found that weather and temperature had stronger correlations with snake venom than diets or types of prey. While venomous snakes use their venoms in defence (hence the problem of snakebite in humans), it is not well known to what extent natural selection for defence has driven venom evolution. The venoms of the Texas coral snake, Micrurus tener, and other species of Micrurus have been found to contain toxins with specific pain-inducing activity, suggesting a defensive function. However, a questionnaire survey of snakebite patients bitten by a wide variety of venomous species showed that pain after most snakebites is of slow onset, arguing against widespread selection for defence. The spitting of venom displayed by some species of spitting cobra is solely a defensive adaptation. A 2021 study showed that the venoms of all three lineages of spitting cobra convergently evolved higher levels of sensory neuron activation (i.e., cause more pain) than the venoms of non-spitting cobras, through the synergistic action of cytotoxins and Phospholipase A2 toxins, indicating selection for a defensive function.

In contrast to venom composition and toxicity to specific lineages, venom yield, or the quantity of venom produced by an individual snake, has not been found to vary with the body-mass of prey animals, and instead to vary with the body-mass of snakes producing it. Yield increases with snake body-mass in a consistent with the hypothesis that snakes invest a constant proportion of metabolic output into producing venom, which is metabolically costly.

== Functional adaptations ==
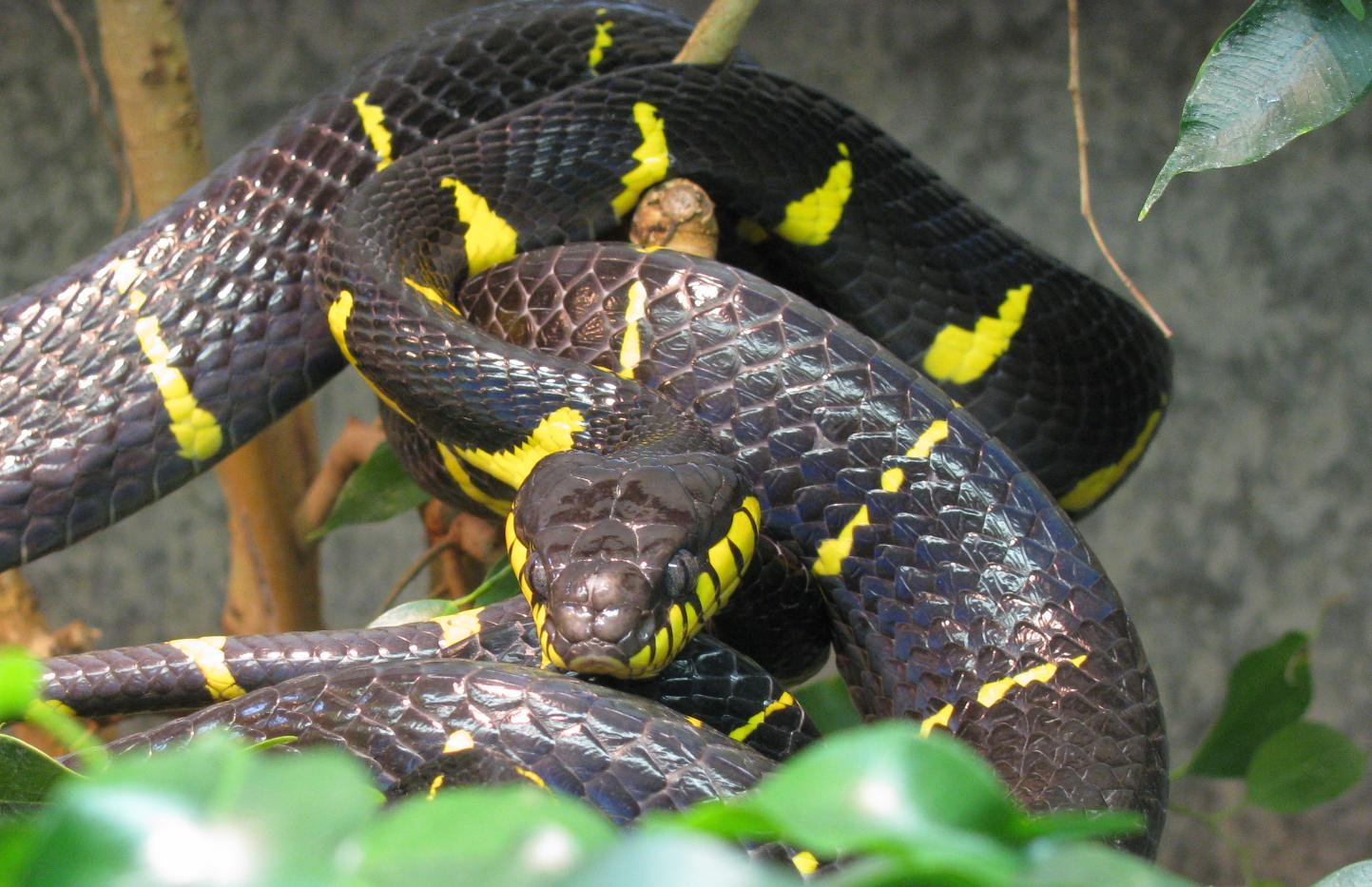
The Mangrove snake Boiga dendrophila, whose venom is toxic to birds.

Snakes use their venom to kill or subdue prey, as well as for other diet-related functions, such as digestion. Current scientific theory suggests that snake venom is not used for defense or for competition between members of the same species, unlike in other taxa. Thus adaptive evolution in snake venom has resulted in several adaptations with respect to these diet-related functions that increase the fitness of the snakes that carry them. This is also reflected in variation in venom composition within a species; venom is known to vary geographically, and by age and size, likely reflecting variation in the prey consumed by different groups within a species. Geographic variation is also present at the species level; island snakes tend to have less complex venoms, while those living in highly productive habitats have more complex venoms, suggesting a biogeographic pattern.

=== Prey-specific venom toxicity ===
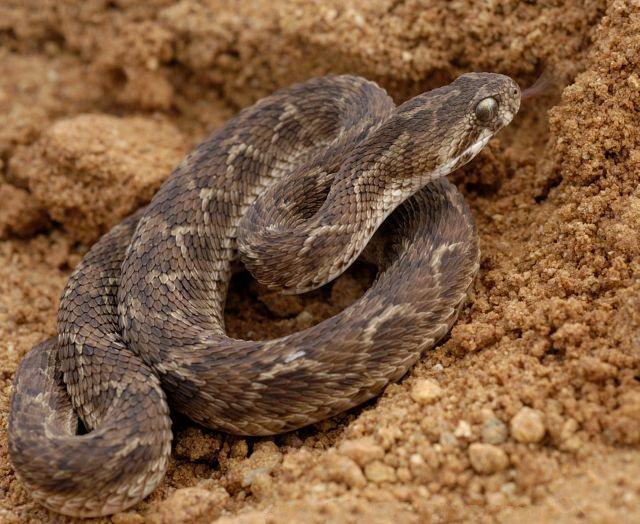
Echis carinatus, one of the many species of the widespread genus Echis. The toxicity of Echis venom to scorpions has been found to vary with the proportion of arthropods in the snake's diet.

Venom that is toxic only to a certain taxon, or strongly toxic only to a certain taxon, has been found in a number of snakes, suggesting that these venoms have evolved via natural selection to subdue preferred prey species. Examples of this phenomenon have been found in the Mangrove snake Boiga dendrophila, which has a venom specifically toxic to birds, as well as in the genera Echis and Sistrurus, and in sea snakes. The venom of Spilotes sulphureus which has two components, one of which is toxic to lizards but non-toxic in mammals, while the other is toxic in mammals and non-toxic in lizards. However, while several snakes possess venom that is highly toxic to their preferred prey species, the reverse correlation is not necessarily true: the venoms of several snakes are toxic to taxa that they do not consume in high proportions. Most snake venom, for instance, is highly toxic to lizards, although the proportion of lizard prey varies among snake species. This has led researchers to suggest that toxicity to a certain taxon is nearly independent of toxicity to another distantly related taxon.

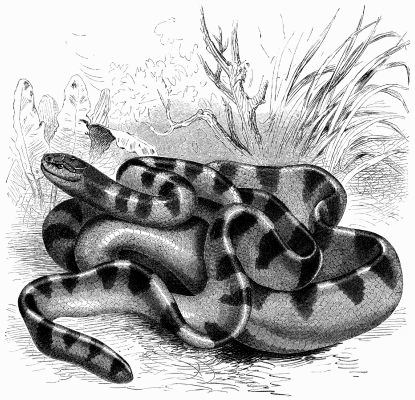
Hydrophis cyanocinctus, a member of a clade that has a greatly simplified venom that evolved in response to a diet of fish

The natural diets of snakes in the widespread viper genus Echis are highly varied, and include arthropods, such as scorpions, as well as vertebrates. Various Echis species consume different quantities of arthropods in their diet. A 2009 study injected scorpions with the venom of various Echis species, and found a high correlation between the proportion of arthropods that the snakes consumed in their natural habitat, and the toxicity of their venom to scorpions. The researchers also found evidence that the evolution of venom more toxic to arthropods was related to an increase in the proportion of arthropods in the snakes' diet, and that diet and venom may have evolved by a process of coevolution. A phylogeny of the genus constructed using mitochondrial DNA showed that one instance of a change in venom composition in the species ancestral to all Echis snakes was correlated with a shift to an arthropod based diet, whereas another shift in a more recent lineage was correlated with a shift to a diet of vertebrates. Despite the higher toxicity of the venom of arthropod-consuming species, it was not found to incapacitate or kill prey any faster than that of species with fewer arthropods in their diet. Thus, the venom is thought to have evolved to minimize the volume required, as the production of venom carries a significant metabolic cost, thus providing a fitness benefit. This pattern is also found in other lineages. Similar results were obtained by a 2012 study which found that the venom of arthropod-consuming Echis species was more toxic to locusts than that of vertebrate-consuming species.

A 2009 study of the venom of four Sistrurus pit viper species found significant variation in the toxicity to mice. This variation was related to the proportion of small mammals in the diet of those species. The idea that Sistrurus venom had evolved to accommodate a mammal-based diet was supported by phylogenetic analysis. The researchers suggested that the basis for the difference in toxicity was the difference in muscle physiology in the various prey animals. Two lineages of elapid snakes, common sea snakes and Laticauda sea kraits, have independently colonized marine environments, and shifted to a very simple diet based on teleosts, or ray-finned fish. A 2005 study found that both these lineages have a much simpler set of venom proteins than their terrestrial relatives on the Australian continent, which have a more varied and complex diet. These findings were confirmed by a 2012 study, which compared the venoms of Toxicocalamus longissimus, a terrestrial species, and Hydrophis cyanocinctus, a marine species, both within the subfamily Hydrophiinae (which is also within the Elapid family). Despite being closely related to one another, the marine species had a significantly simpler set of venom proteins. The venoms of the sea snakes are nonetheless among the most toxic venoms known. It has been argued that since sea snakes are typically unable to prevent the escape of bitten prey, their venoms have evolved to act very rapidly.

=== Pre-digestion of prey ===
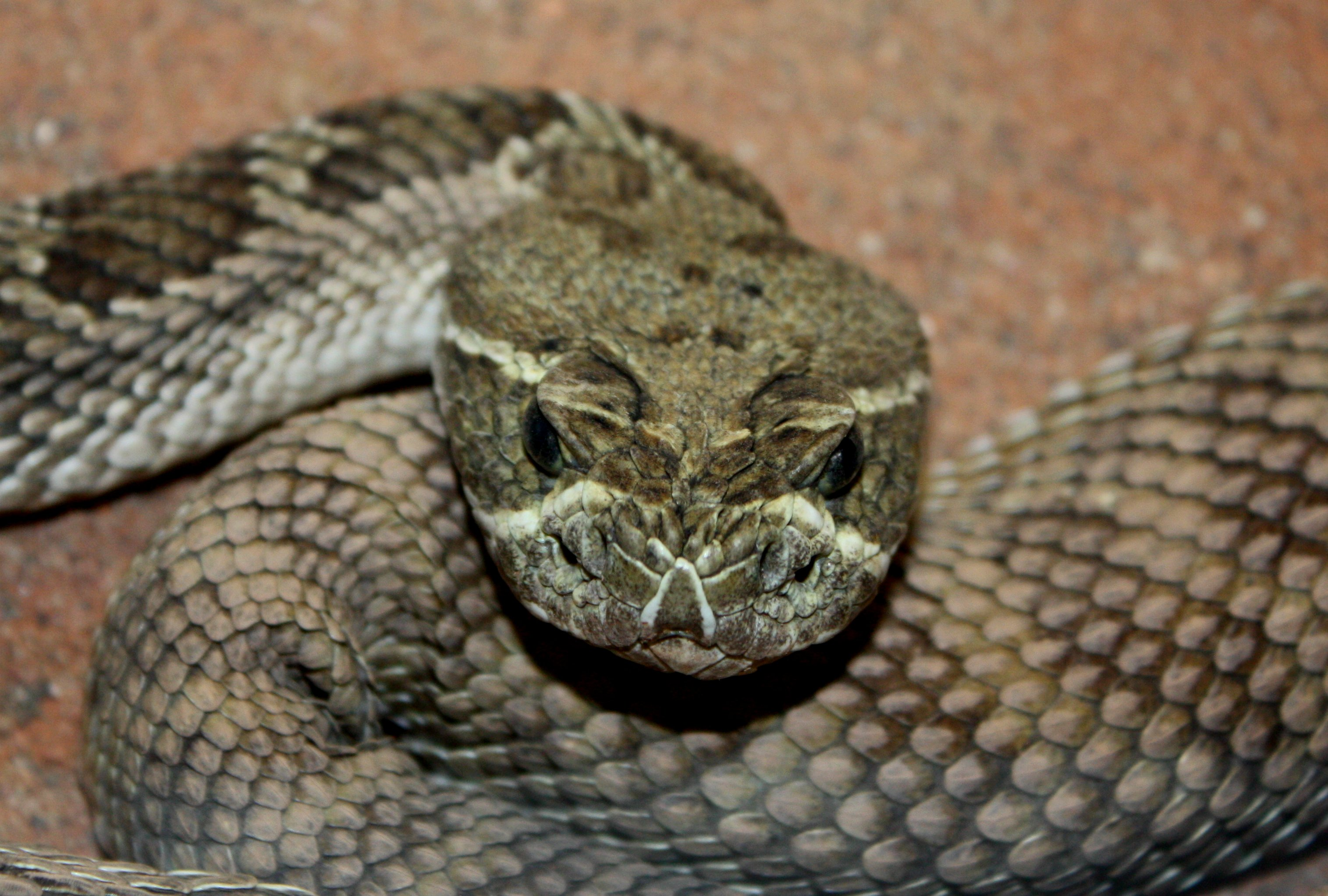
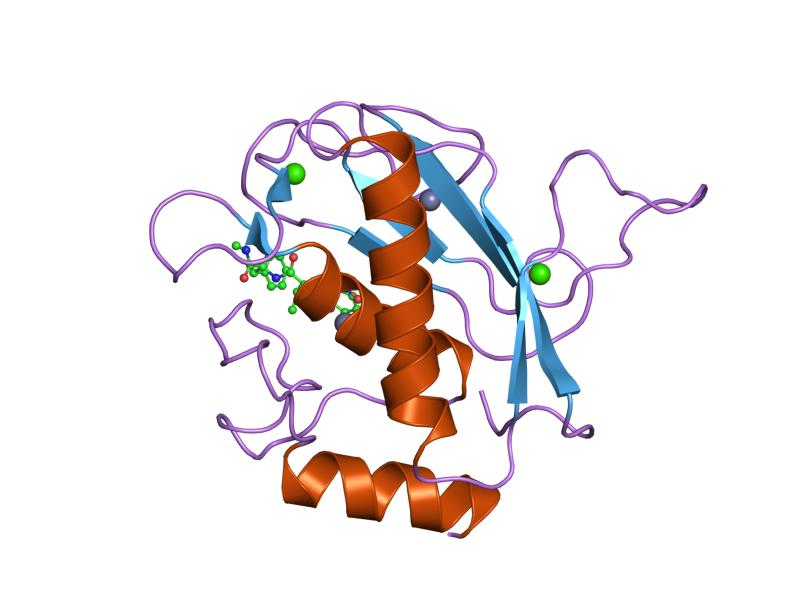
The venom of the prairie rattlesnake, Crotalus viridis (left) includes metalloproteinases (example on the right) which help digest the prey before the snake eats it.

The various subspecies of the rattlesnake genus Crotalus, produce venoms that carry out two conflicting functions. The venom immobilizes prey after a bite, and also helps digestion by breaking down tissues before the snake eats its prey. As with other members of the family Viperidae, the venoms of Crotalus disrupt the homeostatic processes of prey animals. However, there is a wide variety of venom compositions among the species of Crotalus. A 2010 study found a 100-fold difference in the amount of metalloproteinase activity among the various snakes, with Crotalus cerberus having the highest activity and Crotalus oreganus concolor having the lowest. There was also a 15-fold variation in the amount of protease activity, with C. o. concolor and C. cerberus having the highest and lowest activities, respectively.

Metalloproteinase activity causes hemorrhage and necrosis following a snake bite, a process which aids digestion. The activity of proteases, on the other hand, disrupts platelet and muscle function and damages cell membranes, and thus contributes to a quick death for the prey animal. The study found that the venoms of Crotalus fell into two categories; those that favored metalloproteinases (Type I) and those that favored proteases (Type II). The study stated that these functions were essentially mutually exclusive; venoms had been selected for based on either their toxicity or their tenderizing potential. The researchers also hypothesized that the reason for this dichotomy was that a venom high in neurotoxicity, such as a type II venom, kills an animal quickly, preventing the relatively slower acting metalloproteinase from digesting tissue.

=== Tracking bitten prey ===
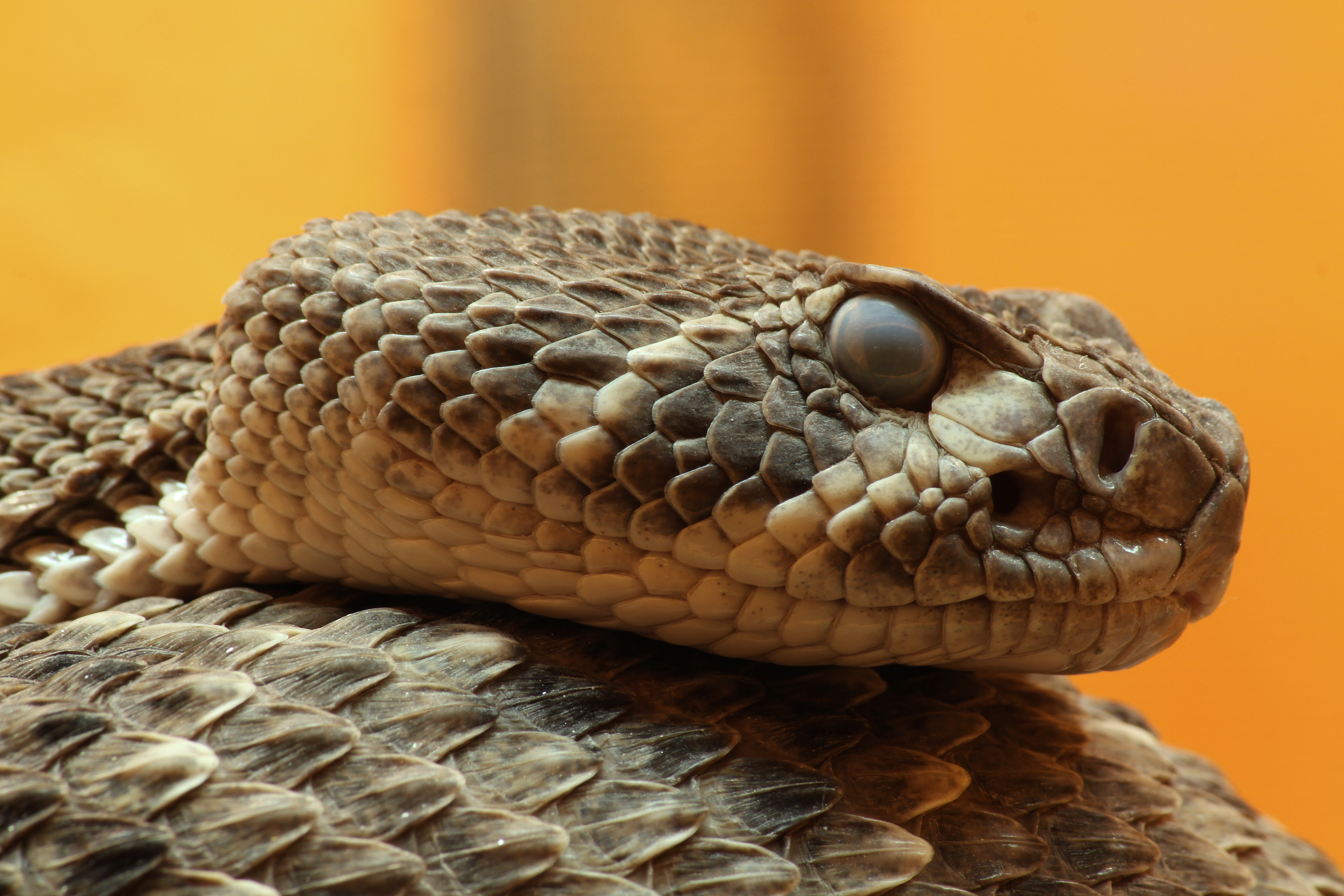
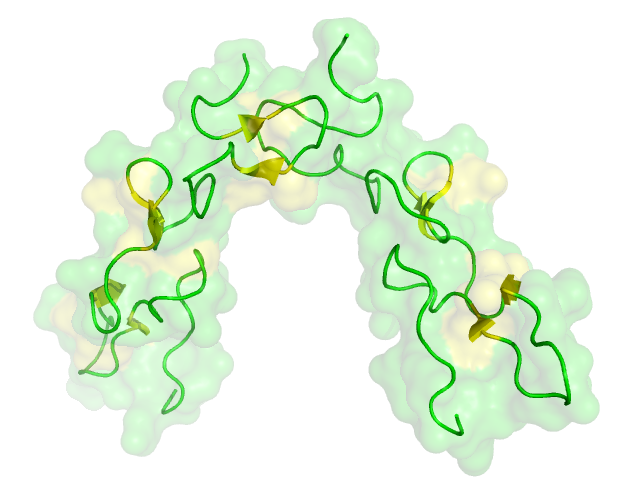
The western diamondback rattlesnake, Crotalus atrox (left), whose venom contains disintegrins (right) which allow it to track bitten prey

Another example of an adaptive function other than prey immobilization is the role of viperid venom in allowing the snake to track a prey animal it has bitten, a process known as "prey relocalization." This important adaptation allowed rattlesnakes to evolve the strike-and-release bite mechanism, which provided a huge benefit to snakes by minimizing contact with potentially dangerous prey animals. However, this adaptation then requires the snake to track down the bitten animal in order to eat it, in an environment full of other animals of the same species. A 2013 study found that western diamondback rattlesnakes (Crotalus atrox) responded more actively to mouse carcasses that had been injected with crude rattlesnake venom. When the various components of the venom were separated out, the snakes responded to mice injected with two kinds of disintegrins. The study concluded that these disintegrin proteins were responsible for allowing the snakes to track their prey, by changing the odor of the bitten animal.

== Diet-based atrophication ==
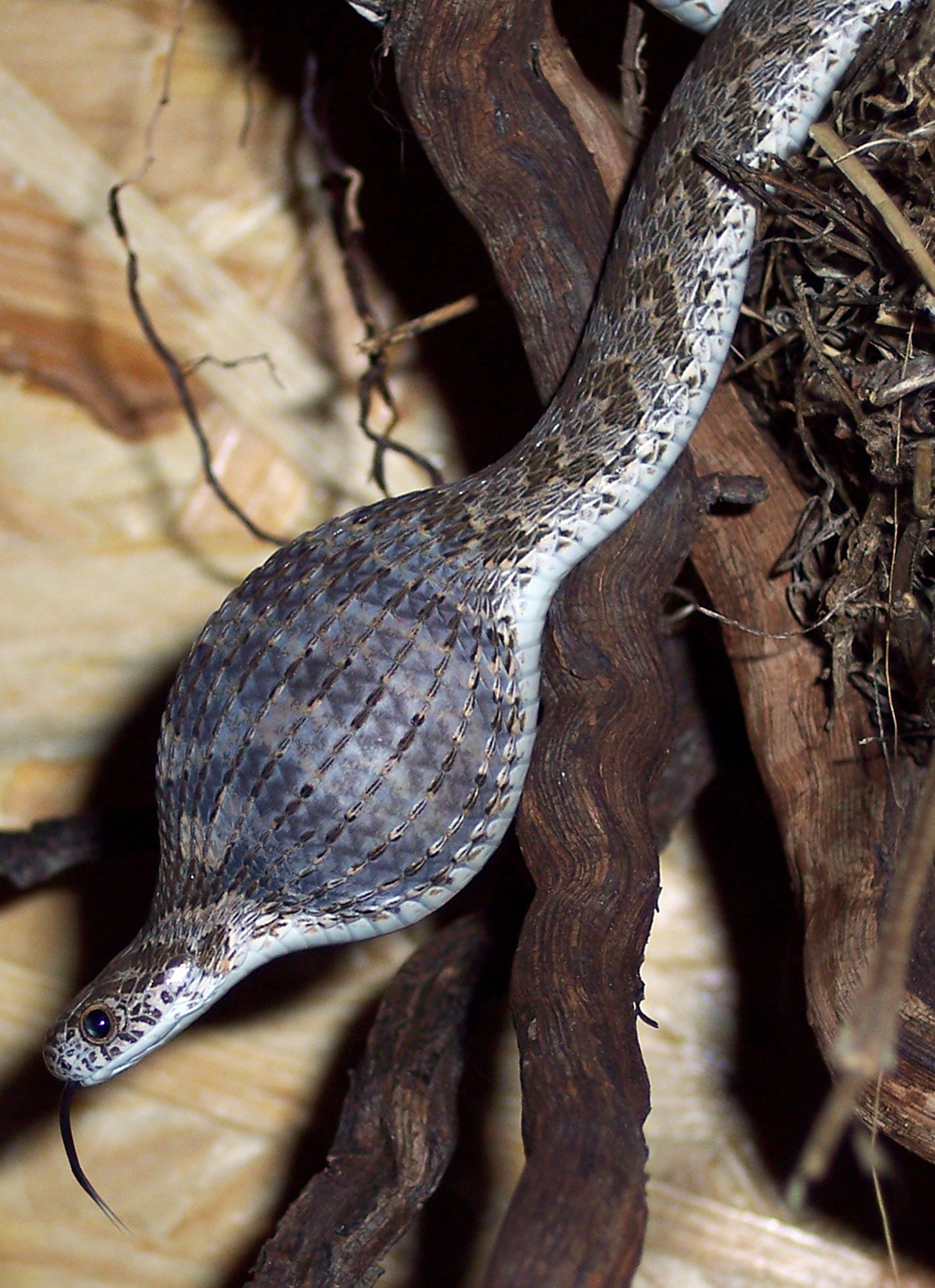
A shift to a diet of eggs has resulted in an atrophied venom system in the common egg-eater Dasypeltis scabra

Venom in a number of lineages of snakes is thought to have atrophied in response to dietary shifts. A 2005 study in the marbled sea snake, Aipysurus eydouxii found that the gene for a three-fingered protein found in the venom had undergone a deletion of two nucleotide bases which made the venom 50–100 times less toxic than it had been previously. This change was correlated with a change in diet from fish to a diet consisting almost entirely of fish eggs, suggesting that the adaptation to an egg diet had removed the selection pressure needed to maintain a highly toxic venom, allowing the venom genes to accumulate deleterious mutations. A similar venom degradation following a shift to an egg-based diet has been found in the Common egg-eater Dasypeltis scabra, whose diet consists entirely of birds' eggs, meaning that the snake had no use for its venom. This has led biologists to suggest that if venom is not used by a species, it is rapidly lost.
