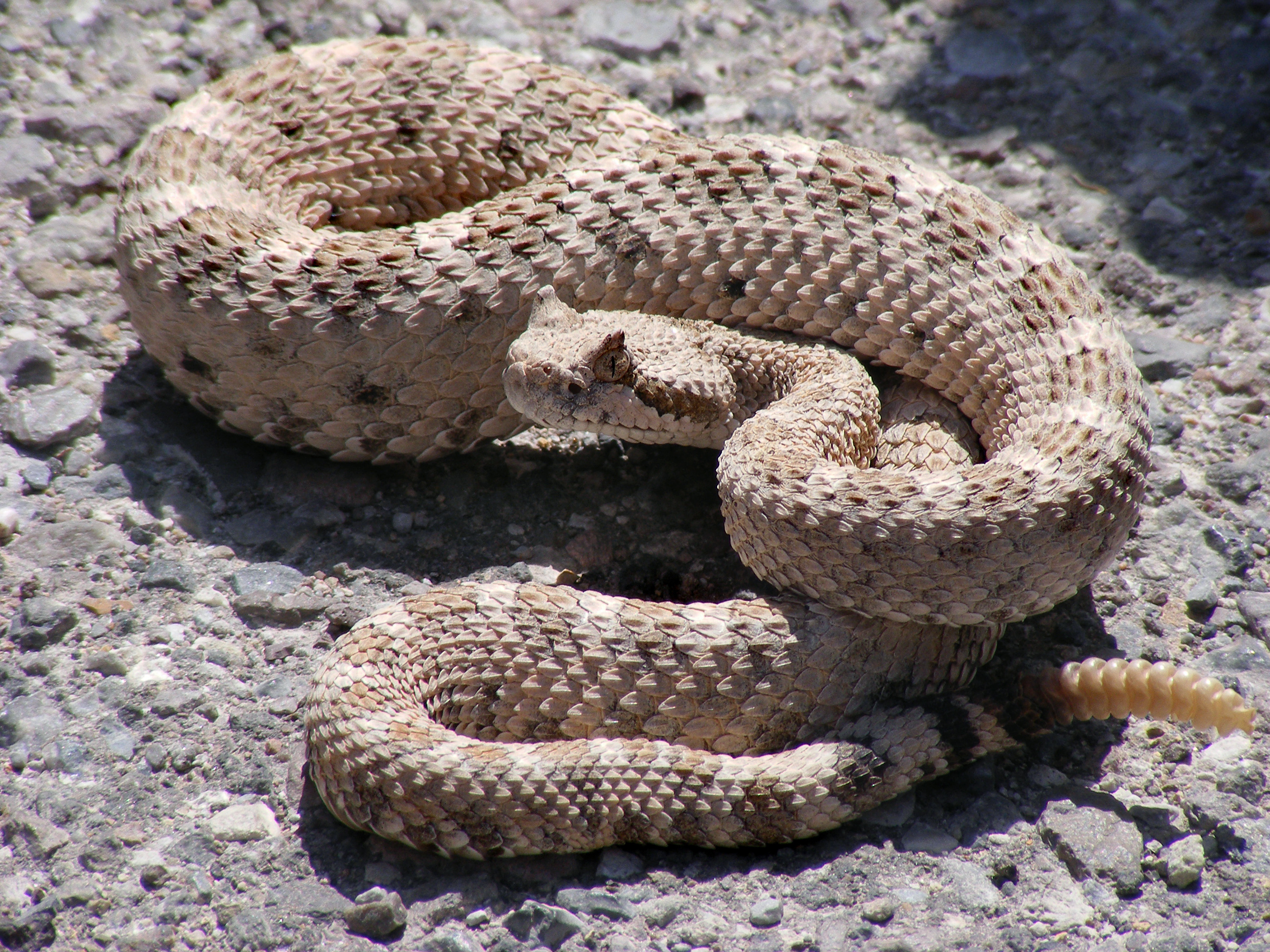
- Crotalus cerastes

Scientific classification
- Kingdom: Animalia
- Phylum: Chordata
- Class: Reptilia
- Order: Squamata
- Suborder: Serpentes
- Family: Viperidae
- Subfamily: Crotalinae

Included genera
- Crotalus Linnaeus, 1758; Sistrurus Garman, 1883

Excluded genera
- The subfamily also includes many genera of non-rattlesnake pit vipers.

= Rattlesnake =

Group of venomous snakes

Rattlesnakes are venomous snakes that form the genera Crotalus and Sistrurus of the subfamily Crotalinae (the pit vipers). Rattlesnakes are predators that live in a wide array of habitats, hunting small animals such as birds and rodents.

Rattlesnakes receive their name from the rattle located at the end of their tails, which makes a loud rattling noise when vibrated that deters predators. Rattlesnakes are the leading contributor to snakebite injuries in North America, but rarely bite unless provoked or threatened; if treated promptly, the bites are seldom fatal.

The 36 known species of rattlesnakes have between 65 and 70 subspecies, all native to the Americas, ranging from central Argentina to southern Canada. The largest rattlesnake, the eastern diamondback, can measure up to 2.4 m (7.9 ft) in length.

Rattlesnakes are preyed upon by hawks, weasels, kingsnakes, and a variety of other species. Rattlesnakes are heavily preyed upon as neonates, while they are still weak and immature. Large numbers of rattlesnakes are killed by humans. Rattlesnake populations in many areas are severely threatened by habitat destruction, poaching, and extermination campaigns.

== Etymology ==
The scientific name Crotalus is derived from Ancient Greek: κρόταλον, romanized: krótalon, lit. 'castanet'. The name Sistrurus is the Latinized form of the Greek for "tail rattler" (Σείστρουρος, Seístrouros) and shares its root with the ancient Egyptian musical instrument the sistrum, a type of rattle.

== Ecology ==
=== Range and habitat ===
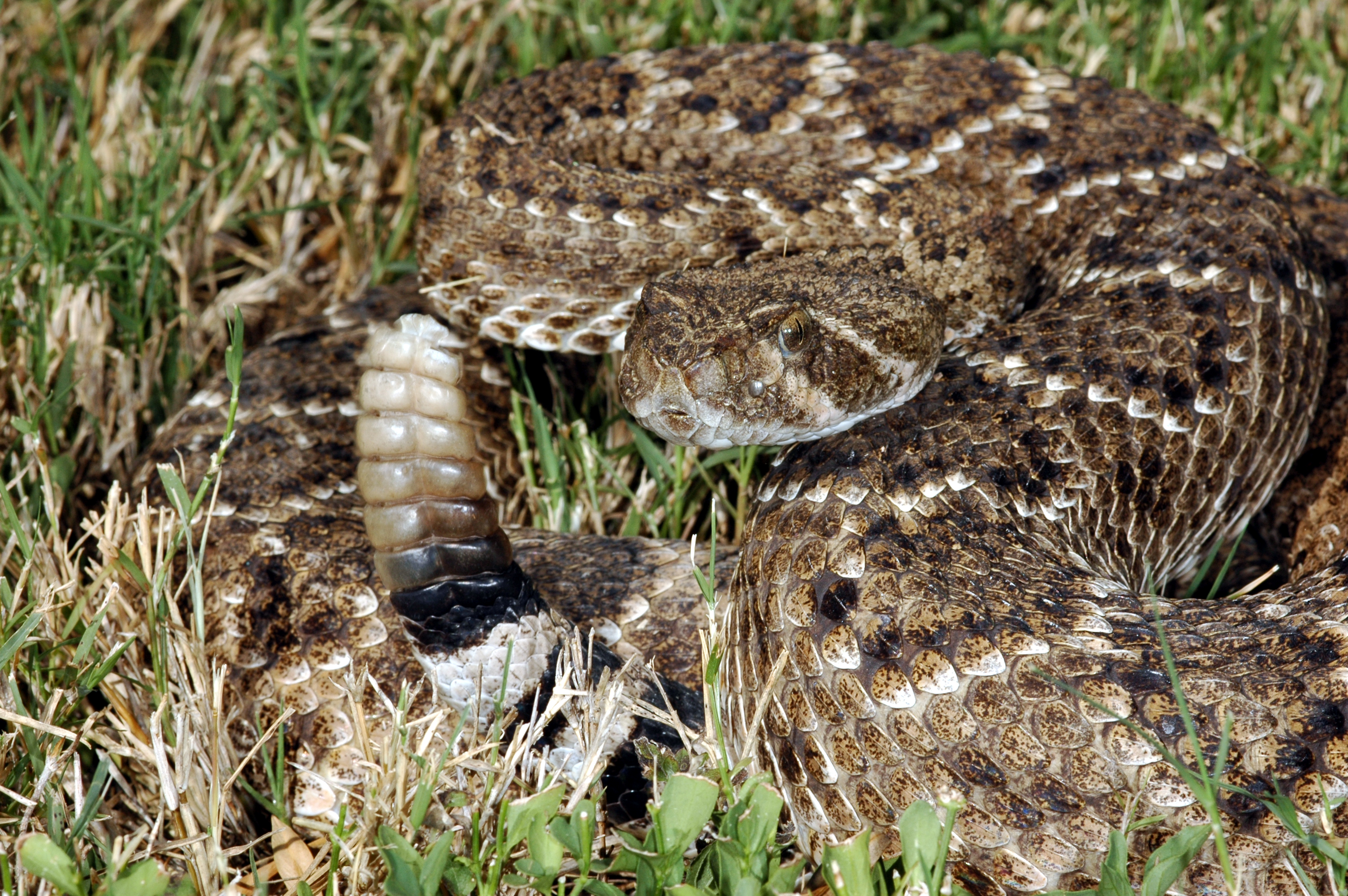
Western diamondback rattlesnake (Crotalus atrox), responsible for the majority of venomous snakebites in North America, coiled in defensive posture with rattle erect

Rattlesnakes are native to the Americas from southern Canada to central Argentina, with the majority of species inhabiting arid regions. The large majority of species live in the American Southwest and Mexico. Four species may be found east of the Mississippi River, and two in South America. In the United States, the state with the most types of rattlesnakes is Arizona, with 13.

Rattlesnakes are found in almost every habitat type capable of supporting terrestrial ectothermic vertebrates, but individual species may have extremely specific habitat requirements, living where certain plant associations occur or within a narrow range of elevations. Most species live near open, rocky areas. Rocks offer them cover from predators, plentiful prey (e.g. rodents, lizards, insects, etc. that live amidst the rocks), and open basking areas. However, rattlesnakes can also be found in a wide variety of other habitats, including prairies, marshes, deserts, and forests. Rattlesnakes prefer a temperature range between 80 and 90 °F (27 and 32 °C), but can survive temperatures below freezing, recovering from brief exposure to temperatures as low as 4 °F (−16 °C), and surviving for several days in temperatures as low as 37 °F (3 °C).

The most probable ancestral area of rattlesnakes is the Sierra Madre Occidental region in Mexico. The most probable vegetation or habitat of the ancestral area appears to be pine-oak forests.

=== Prey ===
Rattlesnakes typically consume mice, rats, rabbits, ground squirrels, gophers, prairie dogs, specific type of bird eggs,ground-nesting birds and other small animals (such as lizards, frogs, toads and occasionally American mink and weasels). They lie in wait for their prey, or hunt for it in holes. The rattlesnake's defence and hunting mechanisms are bound to its physiology and its environment. More importantly environmental temperature can influence the ability of ectotherms. The prey is killed quickly with a venomous bite as opposed to constriction. If the bitten prey moves away before dying, the rattlesnake can follow it by its scent. When it locates the fallen prey, it checks for signs of life by prodding with its snout, flicking its tongue, and using its sense of smell. Once the prey has become incapacitated, the rattlesnake locates its head by odors emitted from the mouth. The prey is then ingested head first, which allows wings and limbs to fold at the joints in a manner that minimizes the girth of the meal. The gastric fluids of rattlesnakes are extremely powerful, allowing for the digestion of flesh and bone. Optimal digestion occurs when the snake maintains a body temperature between 80 and 85 °F (27 and 29 °C). If the prey is small, the rattlesnake often continues hunting. If the meal was adequate, the snake finds a warm, safe location in which to coil up and rest until the prey is digested. Feeding habits play an important ecological role by limiting the size of rodent populations, which prevents crop damage and stabilizes ecosystems.

=== Hydration ===
Rattlesnakes are believed to require at least their own body weight in water annually to remain hydrated. The method by which they drink depends on the water source. In larger bodies of water (streams, ponds, etc.), they submerge their heads and ingest water by opening and closing their jaws, which sucks in water. If drinking dew or small puddles, they sip the liquid either by capillary action or by flattening and flooding their lower jaws.

In desert environments, scientists observe that rattlesnakes have evolved to stay hydrated by coiling up and flattening so that their bodies can collect rain. In some instances, they aggregated in a carpet-like formation to make a larger rain-collecting platform.

=== Predators ===
Newborn rattlesnakes are heavily preyed upon by a variety of species, including cats, ravens, crows, roadrunners, raccoons, opossums, skunks, coyotes, weasels, whipsnakes, kingsnakes, and racers. Young of the smaller crotaline species are frequently killed and eaten by small predatory birds, such as jays, kingfishers, and shrikes. Some species of ants in the genus Formica are known to prey upon neonates, and Solenopsis invicta (fire ants) likely do, as well. On occasion, hungry adult rattlesnakes cannibalize neonates. The small proportion (often as few as 20%) of rattlesnakes that make it to their second year are heavily preyed upon by a variety of larger predators, including coyotes, eagles, hawks, owls, falcons, feral pigs, badgers, indigo snakes, and kingsnakes.

The common kingsnake (Lampropeltis getula), a constrictor, is immune to the venom of rattlesnakes and other vipers, and rattlesnakes form part of its natural diet. Rattlesnakes sense kingsnakes' presence by their odor. When they realize a kingsnake is nearby, they begin enacting a set of defensive postures known as "body bridging". Unlike its normal erect and coiled defensive-striking posture, the rattlesnake keeps its head low to the ground in an attempt to prevent the kingsnake from gaining a hold on it (the head being the first part of the rattlesnake to be ingested). The rattlesnake jerks its body about, while bridging its back upwards, forming an elevated coil that faces the kingsnake. The elevated coil is used to strike the attacker, and is also used to shield the head from the kingsnake.

== Anatomy ==
=== Sensory organs ===
Like all pit vipers, rattlesnakes have two organs that can sense radiation; their eyes and a set of heat-sensing "pits" on their faces that enable them to locate prey and move towards it, based on the prey's thermal radiation signature. These pits have a relatively short effective range of about 1 ft (0.30 m) but give the rattlesnake a distinct advantage in hunting for warm-blooded creatures at night.

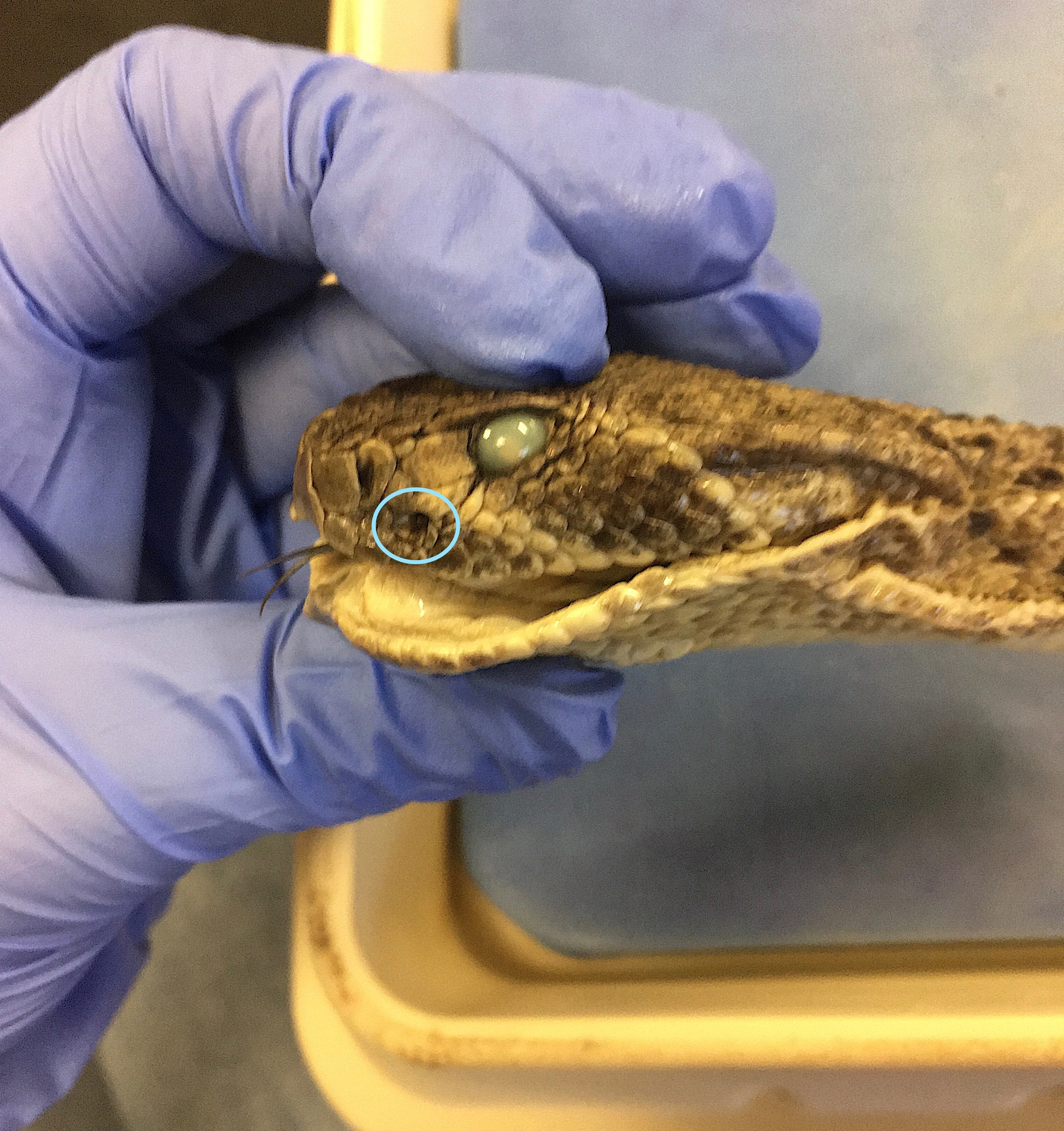
Heat-sensing pits located in blue circle on a rattlesnake specimen: Location of the pit is the same in all Viperidae.

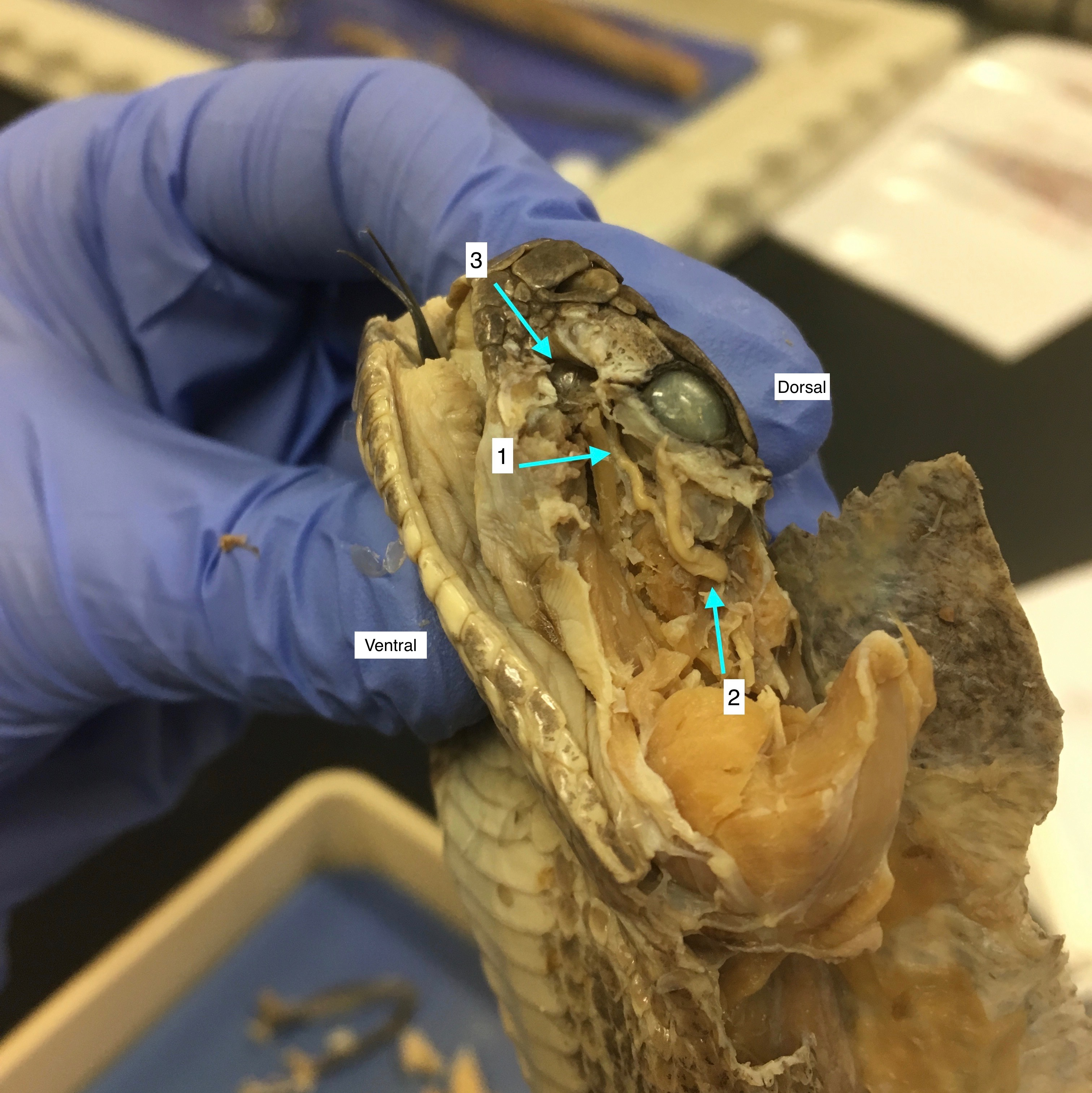
1. Trigeminal nerve extending into the heat-sensing pit 2. Trigeminal nerve originating in the brain 3. Heat-sensing pit

==== Heat-sensing pits ====
Aside from their eyes, rattlesnakes are able to detect thermal radiation emitted by warm-blooded organisms in their environment. Functioning optically like a pinhole camera eye, thermal radiation in the form of infrared light passes through the opening of the pit and strikes the pit membrane located in the back wall, warming this part of the organ. Due to the high density of heat-sensitive receptors innervating this membrane, the rattlesnake can detect temperature changes of 0.003 °C or less in its immediate surroundings. Infrared cues from these receptors are transmitted to the brain by the trigeminal nerve, where they are used to create thermal maps of the snake's surroundings. Due to the small sizes of the pit openings, typically these thermal images are low in resolution and contrast. Nevertheless, rattlesnakes superimpose visual images created from information from the eyes with these thermal images from the pit organs to more accurately visualize their surroundings in low levels of light. Research conducted recently on the molecular mechanism of this ability suggests the temperature sensitivity of these pit organs is closely linked to the activity of transient receptor potential ankyrin 1, a temperature-sensitive ion channel saturated in the pit membrane.

==== Eyes ====
Rattlesnake eyes, which contain many rod cells, are well adapted to nocturnal use. Rattlesnakes, though, are not exclusively nocturnal, and their vision is more acute during daylight conditions. Rattlesnakes also possess cone cells, which means they are capable of some form of color vision. The rattlesnake eye lacks a fovea, making vision of sharply defined images impossible. Instead, they mostly rely on the perception of movement. Rattlesnake eyes are capable of horizontal rotation, but they do not appear to move their eyeballs to follow moving objects.

==== Smell ====
Rattlesnakes have a well-developed sense of smell. They can sense olfactory stimuli both through their nostrils and by flicking their tongues, which carry scent-bearing particles to the Jacobson's organs in the roof of their mouths.

==== Auditory system ====
Like all snakes, rattlesnakes lack external ear openings, and the structures of their middle ear are not as highly specialized as those of other vertebrates, such as mammals. Thus, their sense of hearing is not very effective, but they are capable of sensing vibrations in the ground, passed by the skeleton to the auditory nerve.

=== Fangs ===
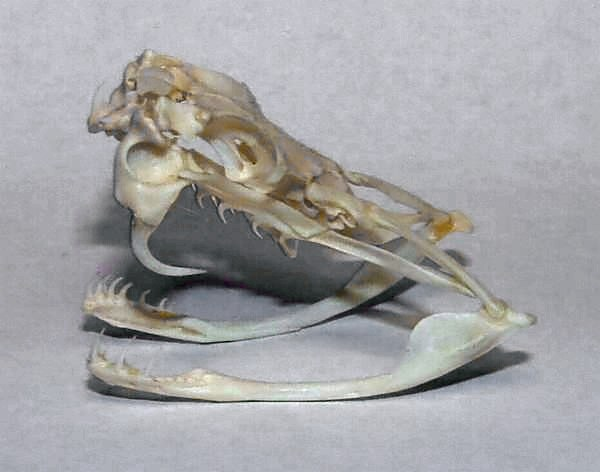
Rattlesnake skull

Rattlesnake fangs are connected by venom ducts to large venom glands near the outer edge of the upper jaw, towards the rear of the head. When the rattlesnake bites, muscles on the sides of the venom glands contract to squeeze the venom through the ducts and into the fangs. When the fangs are not in use, they remain folded against the palate.

Rattlesnakes are born with fully functioning fangs and venom, and are capable of killing prey at birth. Adult rattlesnakes shed their fangs every 6–10 weeks. At least three pairs of replacement fangs lie behind the functional pair.

=== Venom ===
Rattlesnake venom is hemotoxic, destroying tissue, causing necrosis and coagulopathy (disrupted blood clotting). In the U.S., the tiger rattlesnake (C. tigris) and some varieties of the Mojave rattlesnake (C. scutulatus) also have a presynaptic neurotoxic venom component known as Mojave type A toxin, which can cause severe paralysis. However, most North American rattlesnakes are not neurotoxic. Although it has a comparatively low venom yield, the venom toxicity of C. tigris is considered to be among the highest of all rattlesnake venoms, and among the highest of all snakes in the Western Hemisphere based on LD_{50} studies conducted on laboratory mice. C. scutulatus is also widely regarded as producing one of the most toxic snake venoms in the Americas, based on LD_{50} studies in laboratory mice.

Rattlesnake venom is a mixture of five to fifteen enzymes, various metal ions, biogenic amines, lipids, free amino acids, proteins, and polypeptides. More specifically, there are three main families of toxins in rattlesnakes: phospholipases A2 (PLA2s), snake venom metalloproteinases (SVMPs), and snake venom serine proteinases (SVSPs). It contains components meant to immobilize and disable the prey, as well as digestive enzymes, which break down tissue to prepare for later ingestion. The venom is very stable, and retains its toxicity for many years in storage.

Snake venom, in general, has a complex and ongoing evolutionary process, and rattlesnake venom is no different. The primary mechanisms of evolution are both gene duplication and gene loss events. The duplication events provided material for neofunctionalization to create the novel toxin genes, while gene loss influenced speciation and helped lead to such a wide variety of "chemical cocktails" in rattlesnake venoms. The prevailing theory for the driving force of this evolution is directional selection, where efficacy on prey is selected for. Diversity in prey leads to less specificity in toxins, while highly specialized toxins are more likely to develop when there are few key prey species. However, recently, balancing selection has been indicated to better explain the maintenance of adaptive genetic diversity in venom-related genes, potentially allowing for the rattlesnakes to better keep up in the evolutionary arms race with their prey.

Older snakes possess more potent venom, and larger snakes are frequently capable of storing larger volumes of it.

=== Rattle ===
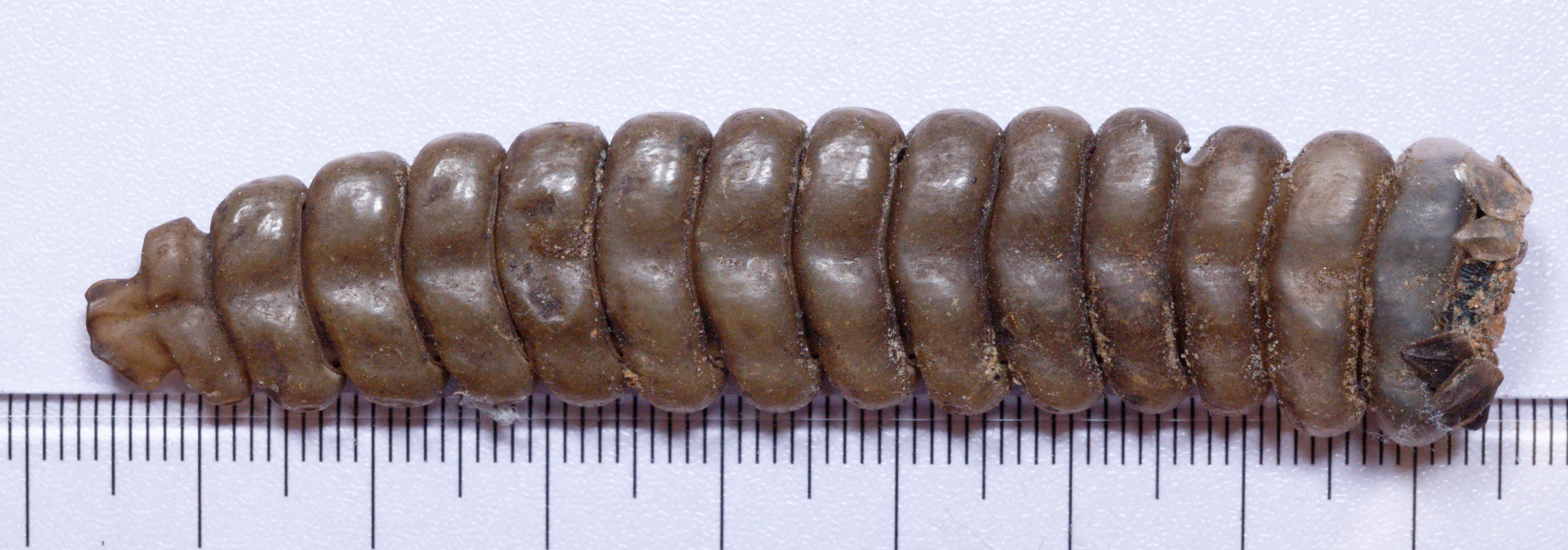
Rattlesnake rattle

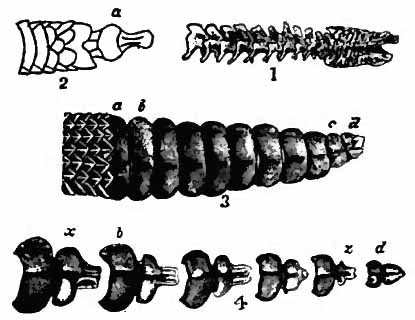
Drawing of the rattle

Rattlesnake
The characteristic sound of a rattlesnake – the rattle shaking, as a result of extremely rapid tail movement

Video of a timber rattlesnake shaking its rattle

The rattle serves as a warning for predators of the rattlesnake. The rattle is composed of a series of hollow, interlocked segments made of keratin, which are created by modifying the scales that cover the tip of the tail. The contraction of special "shaker" muscles in the tail causes these segments to vibrate against one another, thus making the rattling noise (which is amplified because the segments are hollow) in a behavior known as tail vibration. The muscles which cause rattling are some of the fastest known, firing 50 times per second on average, sustainable for a duration of up to three hours.

In 2016, Allf et al. published a paper proposing behavioral plasticity as the mechanism by which the rattling system evolved in rattlesnakes. In the case of rattlesnakes, Allf et al. proposed that tail vibration in response to predator threat could be the precursor for the rattling system in rattlesnakes, an example of behavioral plasticity. To investigate this hypothesis, the researchers analyzed tail vibration and relatedness to rattlesnakes among snakes in the families Viperidae and Colubridae. Their results demonstrated that the more closely related a species was to rattlesnakes, the more similar that species was to rattlesnakes in both duration and rate of tail vibration. These results strongly support the hypothesis that tail vibration preceded the rattling system as a behavior and allowed for the rattle to be selected for once developed. Even a small, underdeveloped rattle early in the evolution of the rattling system could have been advantageous if tail vibration was an ancestral behavior.

At birth, a "prebutton" is present at the tip of the snake's tail; it is replaced by the "button" several days later when the first skin is shed. However, no sound can be made by the rattle until a second segment is added when the skin is shed again. A new rattle segment is added each time the snake sheds its skin, and the snake may shed its skin several times a year, depending on food supply and growth rate.

Rattlesnakes travel with their rattles held up to protect them from damage, but in spite of this precaution, their day-to-day activities in the wild still cause them to regularly break off end segments. Because of this, the number of rattles on its tail is not related to the age of a rattlesnake.

Compared to females, males have thicker and longer tails (because they contain the inverted hemipenes). Also, the tails of males taper gradually from the body, whereas the tails of females narrow abruptly at the vent.

=== Skin and circulation ===
Rattlesnakes, like other members of the Squamata order, have a circulatory system that is powered by a three-chambered heart composed of two atria and one ventricle. The right atrium receives deoxygenated blood from veins coming from the systemic circuit. The left atrium receives oxygenated blood from the lungs in the pulmonary circuit and pumps it to the ventricle and through the systemic circuit via capillaries and arteries.

Rattlesnake skin has a set of overlapping scales that cover the entire body, providing protection from a variety of threats, including dehydration and physical trauma. The typical rattlesnake, genus Crotalus, has the top of its head covered with small scales, except, with a few species, a few crowded plates directly over the snout. The skin of snakes is highly sensitive to contact, tension, and pressure; they are capable of feeling pain.

An important function of the skin is the sensation of changes in air temperature, which can guide the snakes towards warm basking/shelter locations. All snakes are ectotherms. To maintain a stable body temperature, they exchange heat with their external environments. Snakes often move into open, sunny areas to absorb heat from the sun and warmed earth, a behavior known as basking. Nerves in the skin regulate the flow of blood into the veins near the surface.

The skin of rattlesnakes is intricately patterned in a manner that camouflages them from their predators. Rattlesnakes do not generally have bright or showy colors (reds, yellows, blues, etc.), instead relying on subtle earth tones that resemble the surrounding environment.

Creases in the epidermal tissue connect the scales of rattlesnakes. When ingesting large prey, these creases can unfold, allowing the skin to expand to envelop a much greater volume. The skin appears to tightly stretch to accommodate the meal, but in reality, the skin is simply smoothing out from its creased state and is not under very high tension.

== Reproduction ==
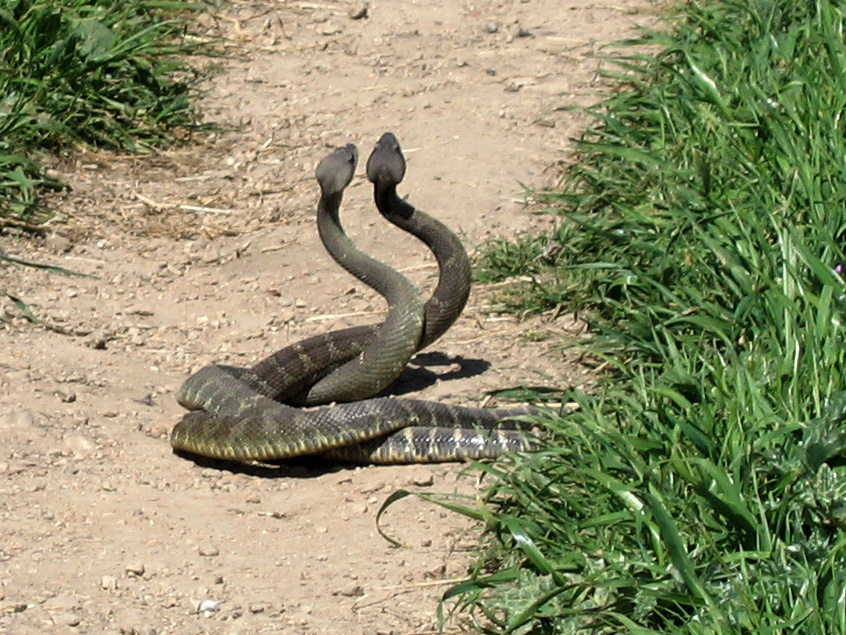
Two male northern Pacific rattlesnakes (C. oreganus oreganus) engage in a "combat dance"

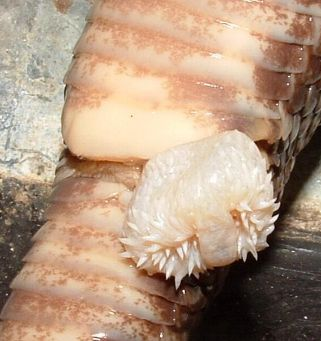
Everted hemipenis of a male C. adamanteus

Most rattlesnake species mate during the summer or fall, while some species mate only in the spring, or during both the spring and fall.

Females secrete small amounts of sex pheromones, which leave a trail the males follow using their tongues and Jacobson's organs as guides. Once a receptive female has been located, the male often spends several days following her around (a behavior not common outside of the mating season), frequently touching and rubbing her in an attempt to stimulate her.

The males of some species, such as timber rattlesnakes (C. horridus), fight each other during the mating season, in competition over females. These fights, known as "combat dances", consist of the two males intertwining the anterior portion of their bodies, often with their heads and necks held vertically. The larger males usually end up driving the smaller males away.

Although many kinds of snakes and other reptiles are oviparous (lay eggs), rattlesnakes are ovoviviparous (give birth to live young after carrying eggs inside). The female produces the ova ("eggs") in her ovaries, after which they pass through her body cavity and into one of her two oviducts. The ova are arranged in a continuous chain in a coiled section of the oviduct, known as the "tuba". Male rattlesnakes have sexual organs known as hemipenes, located in the base of the tail. The hemipenis is retracted inside of the body when mating is not occurring. The hemipenis is similar to the human penis. Females can store semen for months in internal recesses known as spermathecae, which permits them to mate during the fall, but not fertilize the ova until the following spring. The Arizona black rattlesnake (C. oreganus cerberus), has been observed to exhibit complex social behavior reminiscent of that in mammals. Females often remain with their young in nests for several weeks, and mothers have been observed co-operatively parenting their broods.

Rattlesnakes generally take several years to mature, and females usually reproduce only once every three years.

== Hybridization ==
Many species that share the same genus have been known to interbreed and create hybrids. Many species of crotalid rattlesnakes have been documented hybridizing in their natural habitats and in captivity. In southwestern New Mexico the Mojave rattlesnake is known to hybridize with the Prairie rattlesnake. These hybrids have been shown to have an overall lower body condition than either parent species. Experiments with hybrids between C. viridis and C. scutulatus have shown no advantage when it comes to hunting and the metrics are about the same across all species.

The hybridization of rattlesnake species can also lead to a change in the overall venom toxicity and composition. This change can lead to a difficulty in treating bites. Rattlesnakes offer the best example for venom differences across the genus with many different species possessing different venom types. It is believed that hybridization is one of the leading causes for this variation in venom types and envenoming strategies.

== Brumation ==
In the colder winter months, some rattlesnake species enter a period of brumation, which is dormancy similar to hibernation. They often gather for brumation in large numbers, sometimes over 1,000 snakes, and huddle together inside underground "rattlesnake dens" or hibernacula. They regularly share their winter burrows with a wide variety of other species (such as turtles, small mammals, invertebrates, and other types of snakes).

Rattlesnakes often return to the same den every year, sometimes traveling several miles to get there. How the rattlesnakes find their way back to the dens each year is unknown, but it may involve a combination of pheromone trails and visual cues such as topography, celestial navigation, and solar orientation.

Species with long periods of brumation tend to have much lower reproductive rates than those with shorter brumation periods or those that do not brumate at all. Female timber rattlesnakes in high peaks in the Appalachian Mountains of New England reproduce every three years on average; the lance-headed rattlesnake (C. polystictus), native to the warm climate of Mexico, reproduces annually.

Like most other snakes, rattlesnakes aestivate during very hot or dry periods, which is why they are rarely seen during the hottest and driest months of summer.

== Conservation status ==
Rattlesnakes tend to avoid developed areas, preferring undisturbed, natural habitats. Rapid habitat destruction by humans, mass killings during events such as rattlesnake round-ups, and deliberate extermination campaigns all pose threats to rattlesnake populations in many areas. Several species, such as the timber rattlesnake, massasauga, and canebrake rattlesnake, are listed as threatened or endangered in many U.S. states.

Many rattlesnakes die from being run over by cars.

In more heavily populated and trafficked areas, reports have been increasing of rattlesnakes that do not rattle. This phenomenon is falsely attributed to selective pressure by humans, who often kill the snakes when they are discovered. However, snake experts have dismissed this theory, stating that snakes simply do not rattle as often as laymen expect them to, and that snakes that live near populated areas simply get used to people passing by, only rattling when a person lingers too long or gets too close.

== Safety and first aid ==
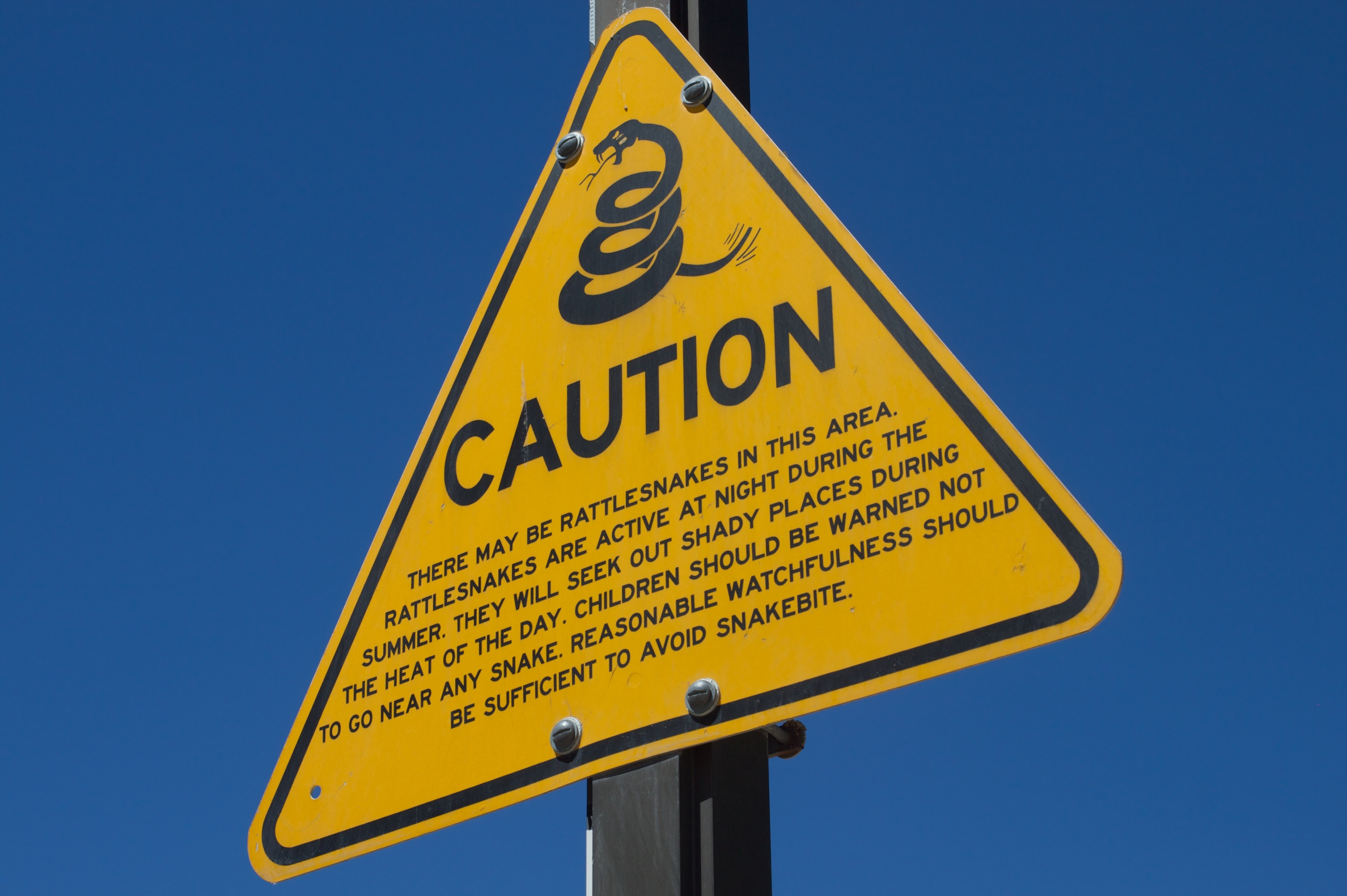
A rattlesnake warning sign in California

Rattlesnakes are the leading cause of snakebite injuries in North America and a significant cause in Central and South America.

=== Avoiding bites ===
Rattlesnakes tend to avoid wide-open spaces where they cannot hide from predators, and generally avoid humans if they are aware of their approach. Rattlesnakes rarely bite unless they feel threatened or provoked. A majority of victims (about 72%) are males. Around half of bites occur in cases where the victim saw the snake, yet made no effort to move away.

Harassing or attacking a rattlesnake, illegal in some jurisdictions, puts one at much higher risk of a bite. Rattlesnakes seek to avoid humans and other predators or large herbivores that themselves pose lethal danger. Dogs, often much more aggressive than humans, are much more likely to experience a snakebite, and are more likely to die of a rattlesnake bite although they can be vaccinated against them.

Caution is advised even when snakes are believed to be dead; rattlesnake heads can sense, flick the tongue, and inflict venomous bites reflexively for up to an hour after being severed from the body.

=== Effect of bites on humans ===
An estimated 7,000 to 8,000 people are bitten by venomous snakes in the United States each year, with about five deaths. The most important factor in survival following a severe envenomation is the time elapsed between the bite and treatment. Most deaths occur between 6 and 48 hours after the bite. If antivenom treatment is given within two hours of the bite, the probability of recovery is greater than 99%.

When a bite occurs, the amount of venom injected is under voluntary control by the snake. The amount released depends on a variety of factors, including the condition of the snake (e.g., having long, healthy fangs and a full venom sack) and its temperament (an angry, hungry snake that has just been stepped on vs. a satiated snake that was merely surprised by walking near it). About 20% of bites result in no envenomation at all. A lack of burning pain and edema 1 cm (0.39 in) away from the fang marks after one hour suggests either no or minimal envenomation occurred. A lack of edema or erythema in the area of the bite after eight hours indicates a lack of envenomation for most rattlesnake bites.

Common symptoms include swelling, severe pain, tingling, weakness, anxiety, nausea and vomiting, hemorrhaging, perspiration, and (rarely) heart failure. Local pain following envenomation is often intense, increasing with the ensuing edema. Children generally experience more severe symptoms because they receive a larger amount of venom per unit of body mass.

== Antivenom ==
Antivenom, or antivenin, is commonly used to treat the effects of local and systemic pit viper envenomations. The first step in the production of crotaline antivenom is collecting ("milking") the venom of a live rattlesnake—usually from the western diamondback (Crotalus atrox), eastern diamondback (Crotalus adamanteus), South American rattlesnake (Crotalus durissis terrificus), or fer-de-lance (Bothrops atrox). The extracted venom is then diluted and injected into horses, goats, or sheep, whose immune systems produce antibodies that protect from the toxic effects of the venom. These antibodies accumulate in the blood, which is then extracted and centrifuged to separate the red blood cells. The resulting serum is purified into a lyophilized powder, which is packaged for distribution and later use by human patients.

Because antivenom is derived from animal antibodies, people generally display an allergic response during infusion, known as serum sickness.

=== Veterinary care ===
In the United States, more than 15,000 domesticated animals are bitten by snakes each year. Rattlesnake envenomations account for 80% of the deadly incidents.

Dogs are most commonly bitten on the front legs and head. Horses generally receive bites on the muzzle, and cattle on their tongues and muzzles. If a domesticated animal is bitten, the hair around the bite should be removed so the wound can be clearly seen. The crotaline Fab antivenom has been shown to be effective in the treatment of canine rattlesnake bites. Symptoms include swelling, slight bleeding, sensitivity, shaking, and anxiety.

== In human culture ==
=== Spirituality ===
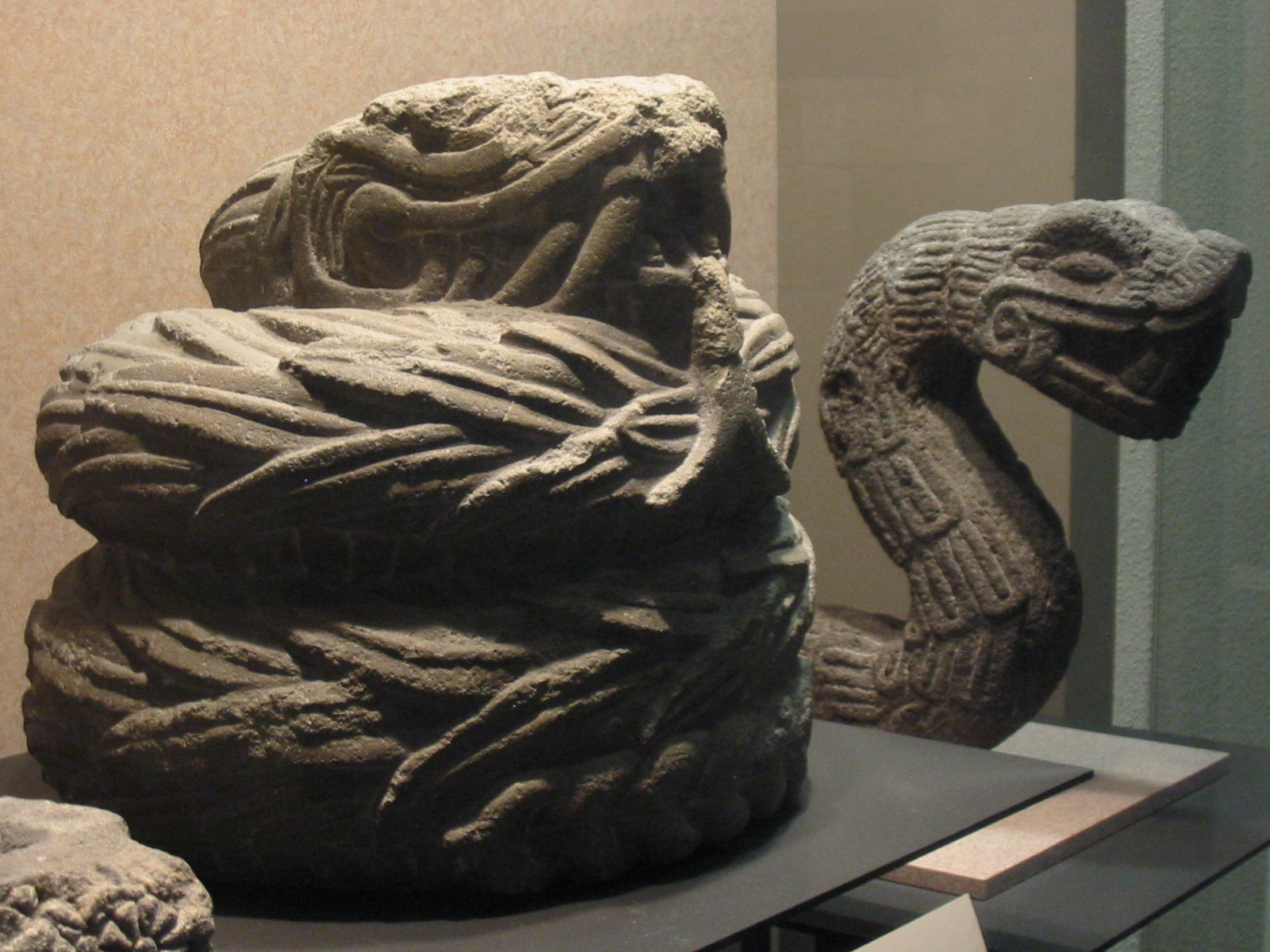
Stone sculptures of feathered serpents on display at the National Museum of Anthropology in Mexico City

==== Indigenous Americans ====
Aztec paintings, Central American temples, and the great burial mounds in the Southern United States are frequently adorned with depictions of rattlesnakes, often within the symbols and emblems of the most powerful deities.

The Feathered Serpent of Mesoamerican religion was depicted as having the combined features of the quetzal and rattlesnake. The Ancient Maya considered the rattlesnake to be a "vision serpent" that acted as a conduit to the "otherworld".

Rattlesnakes are a key element in Aztec mythology and were widely represented in Aztec art, including sculptures, jewelry, and architectural elements.

==== Christian snake-handling sects ====
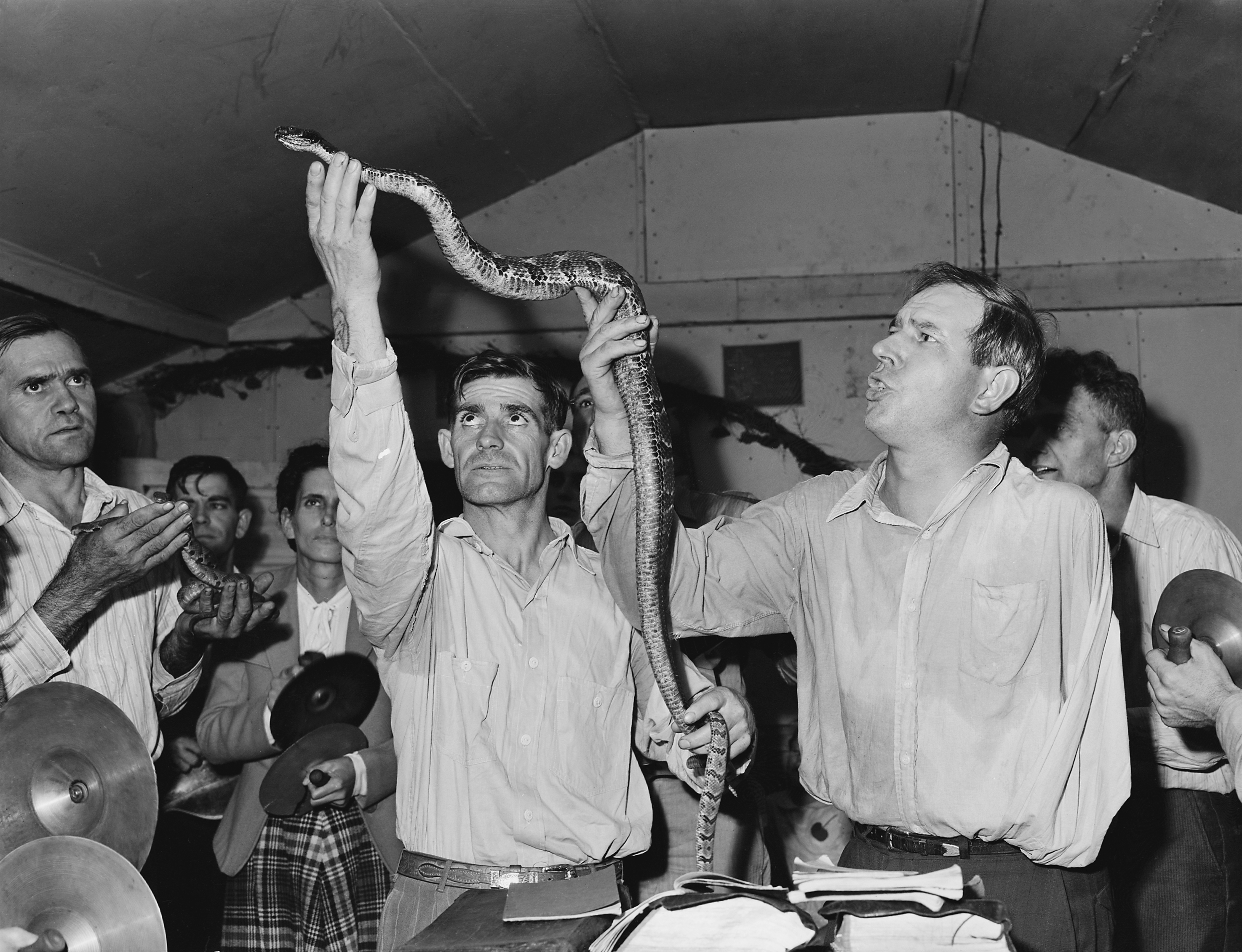
Snake handling at the Pentecostal Church of God in the town of Lejunior, Harlan County, Kentucky, September 15, 1946

Members of some Christian sects in the Southern United States are regularly bitten while participating in "snake handling" rituals. Snake handling is when people hold venomous snakes, unprotected, as part of a religious service inspired by a literal interpretation of the Bible verses Mark 16:17–18, which reads, "In my name ... They shall take up serpents ...."

=== In traditional medicine ===
Meriwether Lewis of the Lewis and Clark Expedition described in 1805 how a hired interpreter, who lived for 15 years with the Mandan, used the rattlesnake's rattle to speed up the delivery of Sacagewea's son Jean Baptiste Charbonneau:

The party that were ordered last evening set out early this morning. the weather was fair and could wind N. W. about five o'clock this evening one of the wives of Charbono was delivered of a fine boy. It is worthy of remark that this was the first child which this woman had boarn and as is common in such cases her labour was tedious and the pain violent; Mr. Jessome informed me that he had freequently administered a small portion of the rattle of the rattle-snake, which he assured me had never failed to produce the desired effect, that of hastening the birth of the child; having the rattle of a snake by me I gave it to him and he administered two rings of it to the woman broken in small pieces with the fingers and added to a small quantity of water. Whether this medicine was truly the cause or not I shall not undertake to determine, but I was informed that she had not taken it more than ten minutes before she brought forth perhaps this remedy may be worthy of future experiments, but I must confess that I want faith as to it's efficacy.

=== As food ===
Journalist Alistair Cooke claimed that rattlesnake tastes "just like chicken, only tougher". Others have compared the flavor to a wide range of other meats, including veal, frog, tortoise, quail, fish, rabbit, and even canned tuna. Methods of preparation include barbecueing and frying; author Maud Newton, following a recipe by Harry Crews, described the taste, "at least when breaded and fried, like a sinewy, half-starved tilapia."

=== Symbolism ===
Gadsden Flag

The rattlesnake became a symbolic animal for the Colonials during the Revolutionary War period, and is depicted prominently on the Gadsden Flag. It continues to be used as a symbol by the United States military, and political movements within the United States.

== See also ==
- List of crotaline species and subspecies

== Sources ==
- Barceloux, Donald G., ed. (2008). Medical toxicology of natural substances: foods, fungi, medicinal herbs, plants, and venomous animals. John Wiley & Sons. ISBN 978-0-471-72761-3.
- Furman, Jon (2007). Timber rattlesnakes in Vermont and New York: biology, history, and the fate of an endangered species. UPNE. ISBN 978-1-58465-656-2.
- Klauber, Laurence M. & Greene, Harry W. (1997). Rattlesnakes: their habits, life histories, and influence on mankind. University of California Press. ISBN 978-0-520-21056-1.
- Rubio, Manny (1998). Rattlesnake: Portrait of a Predator. Smithsonian Books. ISBN 1-56098-808-8.
