= Calciseptine =

Neurotoxin

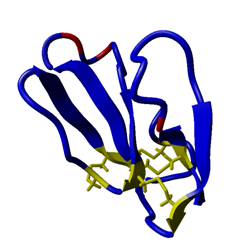
- A model of the 3D structure of calciseptine, based on an NMR structure of its homologue FS2 (PDB: 1TFS). Disulfide bridges are shown in yellow. The three residues that differ between FS2 and calciseptine are shown in red.

Identifiers
- Organism: Dendroaspis polylepis polylepis
- Symbol: CaS
- UniProt: P22947
Search for
- Structures: Swiss-model
- Domains: InterPro

Calciseptine (CaS) is a natural neurotoxin isolated from the black mamba Dendroaspis p. polylepis venom. This toxin consists of 60 amino acids with four disulfide bonds. Calciseptine specifically blocks L-type calcium channels, but not other voltage-dependent Ca^{2+} channels such as N-type and T-type channels.

== History ==
The black mamba (Dendroaspis polylepis) is generally considered to be one of the deadliest snakes on the planet, and is responsible for many fatalities throughout its sub-Saharan Africa range. Without treatment, the bite of a black mamba causes a 100% mortality rate.

The venom of the black mamba consists of more than 28 peptides. One of these peptides is calciseptine, which makes up 2.8% of the venom. When first purified, the peptide was called protein E3, which was later changed to calciseptine by Weille et al.

=== Importance ===
Calciseptine has been shown to specifically inhibit the L-type voltage-gated Ca^{2+} channels and was the first natural polypeptide discovered with this property. Specific polypeptide inhibitors of voltage-sensitive channels are important tools in research, and were already known for voltage-sensitive Na^{+} channels, both voltage-sensitive and Ca^{2+}-activated K^{+} channels, and for N-type Ca^{2+}-channels.

Before calciseptine was sequenced and shown to be a specific L-type calcium channel inhibitor, no specific polypeptide inhibitors were known for this type of voltage-gated channels. Specific blockers of the L-type channel were small organic molecules like 1,4-dihydropyridines. It was suggested that polypeptide inhibitors could be found in snake venoms. Calciseptine confirmed this as it was shown to not only block the L-type channels specifically, but also to do this in exactly the same spot as the 1,4-dihydropyridines. After calciseptine, other polypeptides specifically blocking the L-type channels were found as well: FS2, C10S2C2 and S4C8.

== Isolation/Synthesis ==
Calciseptine is only found in the black mamba and can be purified from the crude venom. The snake can be milked to acquire the venom. Schweitz et al. used a three-step method to purify calciseptine to homology. The three steps were: 1) gel filtration, 2) ion exchange on TSK SP 5PW and 3) reverse-phase chromatography on RP18.

Scientists also succeeded in synthesizing calciseptine in the lab. FS2, which is another component of the black mamba's venom and is homologous to calciseptine, can also be synthesized in the lab.

== Structure ==
=== Three-fingered toxin family ===
Calciseptine is a member of a family of toxic peptides found in snake venoms. Proteins from this family are small and consist of 58 to 74 amino acids. They all have the same three-fingered structure which arises from the formation of four disulfide bridges between eight cysteine residues.

The activities of these toxins - although they are members of the same family - are actually quite diverse and can range from the blocking of acetylcholine receptors to the changing of membrane permeability. Their common feature is that they all affect signal transduction in some way.

=== Sequence and structure ===
Calciseptine itself consists of 60 amino acids and has been fully sequenced:

RICYIHKASL PRATKTCVEN TCYKMFIRTQ REYISERGCG CPTAMWPYQT ECCKGDRCNK

The three-dimensional structure of calciseptine has not been determined experimentally. However, another toxin found in black mamba venom, called FS2, sequentially differs from calciseptine in only three residues: it contains a serine instead of isoleucine in position 5, a histidine instead of glutamine in position 30, and a glutamine instead of glutamic acid in position 32. A three-dimensional structure of FS2 has been determined using NMR, and because of the minor sequential differences, this can serve as a model of the calciseptine structure.

== Toxicokinetics ==
=== Absorption and distribution ===
As calciseptine is injected by the snake into its prey along with the rest of its venom, it does not have to pass the protective barrier of the skin and is injected directly into the tissues and/or bloodstream of the prey. No research has been conducted on the toxicokinetics of calciseptine specifically, but general research about snake toxin dynamics is available. Although the toxic peptides are generally small (about 60 amino acids), their size is sufficient to prevent them from crossing epithelial layers like the blood–brain barrier.

Bioavailability measurements have been conducted for several snake venoms. For example, cobra venom has been found to have a bioavailability of 41.7% when injected intramuscular, and for other venoms this may even be less than 10%. These values are quite low compared to those of most therapeutic drugs, which usually have a bioavailability of nearly 100% after intramuscular injection. In general, toxic peptides of 10-40 amino acids have been found to have a relatively poor bioavailability due to their size and hydrophilicity. Thus, calciseptine, containing 60 amino acids, is expected to have a low bioavailability as well.

=== Metabolism ===
Because calciseptine is a peptide, theoretically it can be broken down by proteases in the tissues where it is injected. It has been found that digestion of snake toxic peptides by proteases does occur in the prey tissues, but due to the relative stability of the toxins, the speed with which the toxins act and the amount of venom injected, this is not enough to protect against the consequences of a snake bite. The same goes for the immune system: the larger venom peptides are unlikely to be missed by the immune system, but immunological action is not fast enough to counter the effects of the venom.

As mentioned above, calciseptine has a three-fingered structure commonly found in toxins. Although many toxins have this structure, their functions are diverse. The reason this structure is so much conserved is probably its stability: the cysteine bridges create a stable core, which possibly slows the breakdown of the protein by proteases.

== Mechanism of action ==
Calciseptine has been shown to block L-type calcium channels, thus inhibiting smooth muscle contraction and cardiac function.

=== Voltage-activated calcium channels ===
Voltage-dependent calcium channels are important for generating electrical signals in excitable cells like neurons and cardiac or smooth muscle cells. N-type Ca^{2+} channels are found in neuronal cells, and play an important role in the coupling of nerve excitation and neurotransmitter secretion. L-type calcium channels are present in cardiac and smooth muscle cells, coupling excitation to muscle contraction. Other types of voltage-activated Ca^{2+}-channels include T-type and P-type channels.

=== Blocking of L-type calcium channels ===
Because the presence of calcium in the cytosol is required for muscle contraction, blockers of calcium channels prevent the muscles from building tension. Blockers of the L-type calcium channels, which occur in cardiac and smooth muscles, thus act as smooth muscle relaxants and inhibitors of cardiac contractions. Common blockers of L-type calcium channels are 1,4-dihydropyridines, which are used in treatment of cardiovascular diseases. Because of their activity as a relaxant, they can relax smooth muscles surrounding blood vessels, thus widening them and lowering the blood pressure.

=== Calciseptine as an L-type calcium channel blocker ===
Calciseptine resembles the abovementioned 1,4-dihydropyridines in its biological action, as it has the same ability to bind and block the L-type calcium channels in smooth and cardiac muscle.

The amino acids responsible for binding and blocking the L-type calcium channels are probably located in the third ‘finger’ of the calciseptine structure, somewhere between amino acids 40 and 50. Although peptides from the three-fingered family are alike in structure, only some of them are able to bind and block calcium channels. Multiple sequence alignment studies yielded 12 amino acid residues that were unique to the toxins with channel-blocking activities. These residues are located at the tips of loops II and III in the three-fingered structure. A model has been proposed in which the amino acids 45 to 48, MWPY, of the FS2 toxin are considered to bind the calcium channels. This model is based on a prediction of the interactions of these amino acids with the calcium channel. These interactions resemble the hydrophobic and hydrogen bonding properties of nifedipine, a known 1,4-dihydropyridine blocker. Because of the similarities between calciseptine and FS2, this model could account for the interactions of calciseptine with the L-type calcium channels as well.

Another model is based on a larger segment of the same loop, containing amino acids 42 to 47, PTAMWP. Because sites of protein-protein interaction have often been found to be flanked by prolines, the presence of the two prolines in this ‘finger’ of the structure indicates a possible interaction site. A short polypeptide of eight amino acid residues, containing this sequence, was indeed found to block the L-type calcium channels, though with a lesser activity.

These interacting amino acids are also found in two other L-type calcium channel blocking proteins, C10S2C2 and S4C8. Although both of these toxins are members of the three-fingered family, the three-fingered structure is probably not a requirement for channel blocking: other snake toxins, including dendrotoxin, have similar effects on various channels, but do not show the three-fingered structure.

== Indications/Symptoms ==
Typical symptoms after being bitten by a black mamba include the rapid onset of dizziness, drowsiness and coughing and having difficulties breathing. Other likely symptoms include convulsions, neuromuscular symptoms, shock, loss of consciousness, hypotension, ataxia, excessive salivation, limb paralysis, nausea and vomiting, fever, and severe abdominal pain. Permanent limb paralysis is very likely if the bite remains untreated. In the most severe case, if untreated, the bite of the black mamba can lead to death by suffocation, resulting from the paralysis of respiratory muscles.

All these symptoms are due to a combination of all the toxic peptides the crude venom of the black mamba contains. The symptoms are related to calciseptine because it also works as a smooth muscle relaxant, thus explaining the early onset of having difficulties breathing, limb paralysis and even death by suffocation. Calciseptine is known to have a hypotensive effect. It cannot clearly be established which peptide is most responsible for which symptom, since combinations of different toxins can have various effects.

== Antidote ==
In case of a bite from the black mamba, the victim should be treated according to a standard protocol. The most important part of this treatment is the intravenous injection of a polyvalent antivenom. South African Vaccine Producers produces this antivenom. Polyvalent means that it can be used for different snakebites: vipers, mambas and cobras. Large quantities of the antivenom must be injected to counter the effects of the venom.

The polyvalent antivenin is produced by injecting horses with adapted venom. The venom is first detoxified to prevent too much damage and death. This is mostly done by complexing the venom with an aldehyde like formalin. The venom is also administered with an adjuvant, like aluminium hydroxide or sodium alginate, to stimulate the immunological response. When the venom is injected, the body will produce antibodies. These will bind components – the variability of peptides – of the venom, which prevent further activity of the molecule and are ultimately removed by the immune system of the body. These antibodies are collected and purified from the blood and then packaged in mostly a liquid form. Horses are used because of the large blood volume. The final antivenom product expires after 5 years and needs to preferentially be kept cool, 4-8 °C. It can, however, survive different environmental situations for some weeks to months, without losing its potency.

Because several venoms of different snakes are injected over time, the horse will develop different antibodies against all the venoms. This gives the antivenin its polyvalent property. This also enhances the potency of the antivenin. Some venoms cannot induce the immune system enough on its own or the combination of two or more venoms result in a better responding antivenin.

== Toxicity ==
=== Lethality ===
Calciseptine is toxic in low doses. No specific data are available on the toxicity of calciseptine in humans. However, the LD_{50} values for mice have been determined and can be found in the table below:

Mode of administration	LD_{50} value
Intravenous injection	0.25 mg/kg
Subcutaneous injection	0.38 mg/kg
Intraperitoneal injection	0.94 mg/kg

=== Venom toxicity ===
The black mamba can inject 100–120 mg venom in one bite. Comparing the LD_{50} results with the amount of venom that can be injected shows that one bite is fatal. For humans a dose of 10–15 mg is enough to be fatal.

=== Other data ===
Calciseptine has an effect on the K^{+}-induced contractions and L-type Ca^{2+} channel activity, the IC_{50} values were determined and gave values of 230 and 430 nM respectively. Calciseptine also has an effect on the cardiac function. The IC_{50} value found for this tissue was 15 nM. These values were determined in rats and mice.

=== Synergistic toxicity ===
It has been found that some three-fingered toxins from mamba venom interact synergistically with each other. The molecular mechanisms of these interactions remain unknown. It is not known either whether calciseptine has a synergistic effect with other venom compounds.

== Effects on Animals ==
Calciseptine has been examined in vivo and in vitro in all kinds of animals, but mostly in rats. Calciseptine relaxes precontracted rat (thoracic) aorta and decreases blood pressure drastically.

The decrease in blood pressure shows a combination of short- and long-lasting effects. The early, acute onset took five minutes, and the effect could last for 120 minutes or longer. In addition, calciseptine had only a small effect on the heart rhythm, changing it only slightly. Furthermore, it can also relax the trachea rings in the lungs. These effects can be explained by the relaxing activity of calciseptine on various smooth muscle cells. The inhibitory effect of calciseptine results in a decreased or total disappearance of electric activity in these cells. The total inhibitory effect depends on the tissue: the cardiovascular system is the most vulnerable, while neuronal cells are less vulnerable and skeletal muscle cells are completely resistant. This difference in tissue sensitivity is probably caused by slight differences in the L-type calcium channels in these tissues. These effects can occur at low subjected amounts of 0.1 till 1 μM calciseptine. In mouse myotube the Ca^{2+} currents show higher amplitude after incubation in calciseptine (1 μM). This effect of calciseptine on the Ca^{2+} current develops relatively fast. Calciseptine changes the reversal potential of the Ca^{2+} current in mouse myotubes. In adult frog skeletal muscle fibers calciseptine also causes an increased Ca^{2+} current. This increase is comparable to the increase which was found in mouse myotubes. In contrast to the mouse myotubes calciseptine did not change the reversal potential of the Ca^{2+} current. In rat muscle fibers after applying calciseptine there were very slight changes found in twitch tension, which shows us that the peptide had very little effect on muscle contraction. Calciseptine also had little effect on frog muscle fibers.

There is a small effect of calciseptine during a series of repetitive stimuli which generate a tetanus; calciseptine increased tetanic tension. The average tetanic tension after applying calciseptine was slightly higher than the control value. Though calciseptine gives an increase in charge movement and increase in influx of Ca^{2+} through L-type channels this has no major effects on contraction of the muscle, even in tetanus.

Research on rats and guinea pigs revealed that synthetic calciseptine and FS2 as well, have the same effect as their natural counterparts.
