= List of South Carolina railroads =

The following railroads operate in the U.S. state of South Carolina.

== Common freight carriers ==
- Aiken Railway (AIKR)
- Camp Hall Rail (CHRL) (Proposed){{
- Carolina Piedmont Railroad (CPDR)
- CSX Transportation (CSXT)
- East Cooper and Berkeley Railroad (ECBR)
- Greenville and Western Railway (GRLW)
- Hampton and Branchville Railroad (HB)
- Lancaster and Chester Railway (LC)
- Norfolk Southern Railway (NS)
- Pee Dee River Railway (PDRR)
- Pickens Railway, Honea Path Division (PKHP)
- Port Terminal Railroad of South Carolina (PTR)
- Port Utilities Commission of Charleston, South Carolina (PUCC)
- RJ Corman/Carolina Lines (RJCS)
- South Carolina Central Railroad (SCRF)

== Passenger carriers ==
- Amtrak (AMTK)

== Defunct railroads ==
Name	Mark	System (Note: This is one or more of the Class I railroads that the railroad became part of, if any.)	From	To	Successor	Notes
Air Line Railroad in South Carolina		SOU	1856	1870	Atlanta and Richmond Air–Line Railway	
Alcolu Railroad	ALU		1902	1936	N/A	
Asheville and Spartanburg Railroad		SOU	1881	1902	Southern Railway – Carolina Division	
Ashley River Railroad		ACL	1876	1901	Savannah, Florida and Western Railway	
Atlanta and Charlotte Air Line Railway		SOU	1877	1996	Norfolk Southern Railway	
Atlanta and Richmond Air–Line Railway		SOU	1870	1876	South Carolina Air–Line Railway	
Atlantic Coast Line Railroad	ACL	ACL	1898	1967	Seaboard Coast Line Railroad	
Atlantic and French Broad Valley Railroad		SOU	1879	1882	French Broad and Atlantic Railway	
Atlantic, Greenville and Western Railway		ACL	1885	1887	Carolina, Knoxville and Western Railway	
Atlantic and Northwestern Railroad		SOU	1885	1887	Georgia and Carolina Midland Railroad	
Augusta and Edgefield Railroad		SOU	1884	1885	Augusta, Edgefield and Newberry Railroad	
Augusta, Edgefield and Newberry Railroad		SOU	1885	1887	Georgia and Carolina Midland Railroad	
Augusta and Knoxville Railroad		ACL	1880	1886	Port Royal and Western Carolina Railway	
Augusta, Knoxville and Greenwood Railroad		ACL		1880	Augusta and Knoxville Railroad	
Augusta Northern Railway			1912	1941	N/A	
Bamberg, Ehrhardt and Walterboro Railway			1913	1938	N/A	
Barnwell Railway		SOU	1882	1891	Carolina Midland Railway	
Belton, Williamston and Easley Railroad		SOU	1878	1879	Atlantic and French Broad Valley Railroad	
Bennettsville and Cheraw Railroad	B&CW		1902	1950	N/A	
Bennettsville and Osborne Railroad			1899	1902	Bennettsville and Cheraw Railroad	
Berkeley Railroad			1892	1906	N/A	
Bishopville Railroad		ACL	1882	1892	South and North Carolina Railroad	
Blackville and Alston Railroad		SOU	1885	1886	Blackville, Alston and Newberry Railroad	
Blackville, Alston and Newberry Railroad		SOU	1886	1891	Carolina Midland Railway	
Blue Ridge Railroad of South Carolina		SOU	1852	1880	Greenville and Columbia Railroad	
Blue Ridge Railway	BLR	SOU	1901			
Branchville and Bowman Railroad			1890	1925	N/A	
Buffalo Union-Carolina Railroad			1922	1971	N/A	
Cape Fear and Yadkin Valley Railway		ACL	1881	1898	Wilmington and Weldon Railroad	
Carolina, Atlantic and Western Railway		SAL	1914	1915	Seaboard Air Line Railway	
Carolina, Clinchfield and Ohio Railway of South Carolina		ACL/ L&N	1909	1990	CSX Transportation	
Carolina and Cumberland Gap Railway		SOU	1896	1898	SOU	
Carolina, Cumberland Gap and Chicago Railway		SOU	1882	1895	Carolina and Cumberland Gap Railway	
Carolina, Knoxville and Western Railway		ACL	1887	1899	Charleston and Western Carolina Railway, Greenville and Knoxville Railway	
Carolina Midland Railway		SOU	1891	1902	Southern Railway – Carolina Division	
Carolina Northern Railroad		SAL	1899	1905	Raleigh and Charleston Railroad	
Carolina and Northwestern Railway	CRN	SOU	1982	1988	Southern Railway	
Carolina and Northwestern Railway	CR&N	SOU	1900	1974	Norfolk Southern Railway	
Carolina Western Railroad	CARW		1923	1971	Seaboard Coast Line Railroad	
Carolina and Western Railroad			1902	1916		
Catawba Valley Railway		SAL	1906	1909	Seaboard Air Line Railway	
Central Railroad of South Carolina		ACL	1878			Still exists as a lessor of CSX Transportation
Central of Georgia Railroad	CG	SOU	1971	1972	N/A	
Charleston, Cincinnati and Chicago Railroad		SOU	1888	1893	Ohio River and Charleston Railway	
Charleston and Northern Railroad		ACL	1895	1895	Cheraw and Darlington Railroad, Manchester and Augusta Railroad, Wilson and Summerton Railroad	
Charleston Northern Railway		SAL	1913	1914	North and South Carolina Railway	
Charleston and Savannah Railroad		ACL	1853	1867	Savannah and Charleston Railroad	
Charleston and Savannah Railway		ACL	1880	1901	Savannah, Florida and Western Railway	
Charleston Southern Railway		SAL	1915	1915	North and South Carolina Railway	
Charleston, Sumter and Northern Railroad		ACL	1890	1895	Charleston and Northern Railroad	
Charleston Terminal Company		ACL/ SOU	1903	1921		
Charleston Union Station Company		ACL/ SOU	1902	1970	N/A	
Charleston and Western Carolina Railway	C&WC, CWC	ACL	1896	1959	Atlantic Coast Line Railroad	
Charlotte, Columbia and Augusta Railroad		SOU	1869	1894	SOU	
Charlotte, Monroe and Columbia Railroad		SAL	1901	1940	N/A	
Charlotte and South Carolina Railroad		SOU	1846	1869	Charlotte, Columbia and Augusta Railroad	
Cheraw and Chester Railroad			1873	1896	Lancaster and Chester Railway	
Cheraw and Coalfields Railroad		ACL	1867	1868	Cheraw and Salisbury Railroad	
Cheraw and Darlington Railroad		ACL	1849	1898	Atlantic Coast Line Railroad	
Cheraw and Salisbury Railroad		ACL	1868	1882	Cheraw and Darlington Railroad	
Chester, Greenwood and Abbeville Railroad		SAL	1885	1886	Georgia, Carolina and Northern Railway	
Chester and Lenoir Narrow Gauge Railroad		SOU	1873	1897	Carolina and Northwestern Railway	
Chesterfield and Kershaw Railroad		SAL	1889	1901	Seaboard Air Line Railway	
Chesterfield and Lancaster Railroad		SAL	1887	1941	N/A	
Cincinnati and Charleston Railroad		SOU	1835	1836	Louisville, Cincinnati and Charleston Railroad	
Clinchfield Railroad	CRR	ACL/ L&N	1924	1983	Seaboard System Railroad	
Colleton County Railroad	CCYR		1986	1988	Hampton and Branchville Railroad	
Columbia and Augusta Railroad		SOU	1863	1869	Charlotte, Columbia and Augusta Railroad	
Columbia and Greenville Railroad		SOU	1880	1894	Blue Ridge Railway, Southern Railway	
Columbia and Hamburg Railroad		SOU	1858	1863	Columbia and Augusta Railroad	
Columbia, Newberry and Laurens Railroad	CNL	ACL	1886	1984	Seaboard System Railroad	
Columbia and Sumter Railroad		ACL	1866	1870	Wilmington, Columbia and Augusta Railroad	
Columbia Union Station Company		ACL/ SOU	1900	1971	N/A	
Conway Coast and Western Railroad		ACL	1904	1912	Atlantic Coast Line Railroad	
Conway Seashore Railroad		ACL	1899	1904	Conway Coast and Western Railroad	
Due West Railway			1907	1940	N/A	
Duval Transportation of the Carolinas			1987	1987	Mid Atlantic Railroad	
East Shore Terminal Company		ACL/ SOU	1887	1903	Charleston Terminal Company	
Eddy Lake and Northern Railroad			1905			
Edgefield Branch Railroad		SOU	1878	1879	Edgefield, Trenton and Aiken Railroad	
Edgefield, Trenton and Aiken Railroad		SOU	1879	1882	French Broad and Atlantic Railway	
Edgemoor and Manetta Railway	EM		1902	1976	N/A	
Eutawville Railroad		ACL	1885	1890	Charleston, Sumter and Northern Railroad	
Florence Railroad		ACL	1882	1898	Atlantic Coast Line Railroad	
Florence and Fayetteville Railroad		ACL	1861	1881	Cape Fear and Yadkin Valley Railway	
Florida Central and Peninsular Railroad		SAL	1893	1900	Seaboard Air Line Railway	
French Broad and Atlantic Railway		SOU	1882	1882	Carolina, Cumberland Gap and Chicago Railway	
Georgetown and Lane's Railroad		SAL	1881	1887	Georgetown and Western Railroad	
Georgetown and North Carolina Railroad		SOU	1882	1885	Charleston, Cincinnati and Chicago Railroad	
Georgetown and North Carolina Narrow Gauge Railroad		SOU	1878	1882	Georgetown and North Carolina Railroad	
Georgetown and Western Railroad		SAL	1887	1915	Carolina, Atlantic and Western Railway	
Georgia and Carolina Midland Railroad		SOU	1887	1887	Charleston, Cincinnati and Chicago Railroad	
Georgia, Carolina and Northern Railway		SAL	1886	1901	Seaboard Air Line Railway	
Georgia and Florida Railroad	G&F	SOU	1926	1963	Georgia and Florida Railway	
Georgia and Florida Railway	G&F, GF	SOU	1963	1971	Central of Georgia Railroad	
Glenn Springs Railroad			1894	1911	N/A	
Green Pond, Walterboro and Branchville Railroad		ACL	1900	1901	Savannah, Florida and Western Railway	
Green Pond, Walterboro and Branchville Railway		ACL	1887	1900	Green Pond, Walterboro and Branchville Railroad	
Greenville and Columbia Railroad		SOU	1845	1880	Columbia and Greenville Railroad	
Greenville and Knoxville Railroad			1904	1914	Greenville and Western Railway	
Greenville and Laurens Railroad		ACL	1878	1886	Port Royal and Western Carolina Railway	
Greenville and Northern Railway	GRN		1920	1997	Carolina Piedmont Railroad	
Greenville and Port Royal Railroad		ACL	1882	1885	Atlantic, Greenville and Western Railway	
Greenville and Western Railroad			1914	1920	Greenville and Northern Railroad	
Greenville and Western Railway			1911	1969		
Greenwood, Anderson and Western Railway		SOU	1895	1897	Sievern and Knoxville Railroad	
Greenwood, Laurens and Spartanburg Railroad		ACL	1880	1886	Port Royal and Western Carolina Railway	
Hampton and Branchville Railroad and Lumber Company	HB		1891	1924	Hampton and Branchville Railroad	
Hartsville Railroad		ACL	1884	1895	Cheraw and Darlington Railroad	
Horry County Railway	HCYR		1984	1987	Waccamaw Coast Line Railroad	
Kings Mountain Railroad		SOU	1848	1874	Chester and Lenoir Narrow Gauge Railroad	
Laurens Railroad		ACL	1847	1881	Laurens Railway	
Laurens Railway		ACL	1879	1895	Columbia, Newberry and Laurens Railroad	
Lockhart Railroad		SOU	1899		N/A	
Louisville, Cincinnati and Charleston Railroad		SOU	1836	1843	South Carolina Railroad	
Manchester and Augusta Railroad		ACL	1870	1898	Atlantic Coast Line Railroad	
Marion County Railway			1984	1985	N/A	
Marion and Southern Railroad		SAL	1907	1937	N/A	
Mid Atlantic Railroad	MRR		1987	1995	Carolina Southern Railroad	
Newberry and Laurens Railroad		ACL	1885	1886	Columbia, Newberry and Laurens Railroad	
Newberry, Whitmire and Augusta Railroad			1906	1910	Augusta Northern Railway	
Norfolk Southern Railway	NS	SOU	1974	1982	Carolina and Northwestern Railway	
North Charleston Terminal Company		ACL/ SAL/ SOU	1916			Still exists as a joint subsidiary of CSX Transportation and the Norfolk Southern Railway
North and South Carolina Railway		SAL	1908	1914	Carolina, Atlantic and Western Railway	
Northeastern Railroad		ACL	1851	1898	Atlantic Coast Line Railroad	
Northwestern Railroad of South Carolina		ACL	1899	1935	N/A	
Ohio River and Charleston Railway		SOU	1894	1898	South Carolina and Georgia Extension Railroad	
Orangeburg Railway			1911	1920	N/A	
Palmetto Railroad		SAL	1882	1895	Palmetto Railway	
Palmetto Railway		SAL	1895	1900	Seaboard Air Line Railway	
Pee Dee Bridge Company		SAL	1911	1915	Carolina, Atlantic and Western Railway	
Pickens Railroad	PICK		1892	1996	Pickens Railway	
Piedmont and Northern Railway	P&N		1911	1969	Seaboard Coast Line Railroad	Electric until 1954
Plant System		ACL	1894	1902	Atlantic Coast Line Railroad	
Port Royal Railroad		ACL	1856	1878	Port Royal and Augusta Railway	
Port Royal and Augusta Railway		ACL	1878	1896	Charleston and Western Carolina Railway	
Port Royal and Western Carolina Railway		ACL	1886	1896	Charleston and Western Carolina Railway	
Raleigh and Augusta Air Line Railroad		SAL	1878	1901	Seaboard Air Line Railway	
Raleigh and Charleston Railroad		SAL	1905	1941	N/A	
Raleigh and Gaston Railroad		SAL	1889	1900	Seaboard Air Line Railway	
Richmond and Danville Railroad		SOU	1879	1894	Southern Railway	
Rockingham Railroad	RKG	ACL	1910	1968	N/A	
Rockton and Rion Railway	ROR		1932	1981	N/A	
Savannah and Charleston Railroad		ACL	1866	1880	Charleston and Savannah Railway	
Savannah, Florida and Western Railway		ACL	1901	1902	Atlantic Coast Line Railroad	
Savannah Valley Railroad		ACL		1886	Port Royal and Western Carolina Railway	
Seaboard Air Line Railroad	SAL	SAL	1946	1967	Seaboard Coast Line Railroad	
Seaboard Air Line Railway		SAL	1900	1945	Seaboard Air Line Railroad	
Seaboard Air Line System		SAL	1893	1900	Seaboard Air Line Railway	
Seaboard Coast Line Railroad	SCL		1967	1983	Seaboard System Railroad	
Seaboard and Roanoke Railroad		SAL	1889	1900	Seaboard Air Line Railway	
Seaboard System Railroad	SBD		1983	1986	CSX Transportation	
Sievern and Knoxville Railroad		SOU	1898	1933	N/A	
South Bound Railroad		SAL	1882	1901	Seaboard Air Line Railway	
South Carolina Railroad		SOU	1843	1881	South Carolina Railway	
South Carolina Canal and Railroad Company		SOU	1827	1844	South Carolina Railroad	
South Carolina Railway		SOU	1881	1894	South Carolina and Georgia Railroad	
South Carolina Air–Line Railway		SOU	1877	1877	Atlanta and Charlotte Air Line Railway	
South Carolina and Georgia Railroad		SOU	1894	1902	Southern Railway – Carolina Division	
South Carolina and Georgia Extension Railroad		SOU	1898	1902	Southern Railway – Carolina Division	
South Carolina Pacific Railway		ACL	1882	1984	Seaboard System Railroad	
South Carolina Terminal Company		ACL/ SOU	1893	1903	Charleston Terminal Company	
South Carolina Western Railway		SAL	1910	1914	North and South Carolina Railway	
South Carolina Western Extension Railway		SAL	1913	1914	North and South Carolina Railway	
South and North Carolina Railroad		ACL	1892	1896	Manchester and Augusta Railroad	
South and Western Railroad		ACL/ L&N	1908	1909	Carolina, Clinchfield and Ohio Railway of South Carolina	
Southern Railway	SOU	SOU	1894	1990	Norfolk Southern Railway	
Southern Railway – Carolina Division		SOU	1902	1996	Norfolk Southern Railway	
Spartanburg and Asheville Railroad		SOU	1873	1881	Asheville and Spartanburg Railroad	
Spartanburg and Union Railroad		SOU	1847	1873	Spartanburg, Union and Columbia Railroad	
Spartanburg, Union and Columbia Railroad		SOU	1878	1896	Asheville and Spartanburg Railroad	
Sumter and Wateree River Railroad		SOU	1898	1902	Southern Railway – Carolina Division	
Union, Gaffney City and Rutherfordton Railroad		SOU	1878	1885	Atlantic and Northwestern Railroad	
Union and Glenn Springs Railroad			1899	1922	Buffalo Union-Carolina Railroad	
Walterboro and Western Railway		ACL	1894	1900	Green Pond, Walterboro and Branchville Railroad	
Ware Shoals Railroad	WS		1908	1985	N/A	
Williamsburg Railroad		ACL	1876	1878	Central Railroad of South Carolina	
Wilmington and Carolina Railroad		ACL	1870	1870	Wilmington, Columbia and Augusta Railroad	
Wilmington, Chadbourn and Conway Railroad		ACL	1885	1895	Wilmington and Conway Railroad	
Wilmington, Columbia and Augusta Railroad		ACL	1870	1898	Atlantic Coast Line Railroad	
Wilmington and Conway Railroad		ACL	1895	1896	Wilmington, Columbia and Augusta Railroad	
Wilmington and Manchester Railroad		ACL	1846	1870	Wilmington and Carolina Railroad	
Wilmington and Weldon Railroad		ACL	1899	1900	Atlantic Coast Line Railroad	
Wilson and Summerton Railroad		ACL	1888	1899	Northwestern Railroad of South Carolina	

Electric

- Anderson Traction Company
- Augusta–Aiken Railway and Electric Corporation
- Charleston Consolidated Railway and Lighting Company
- Charleston – Isle of Palms Traction Company
- Greenville, Spartanburg and Anderson Railway
- Piedmont and Northern Railway (P&N)

Private carriers

- Winnsboro Granite Corporation
