= List of Atlantic Coast Line Railroad predecessors =

These railroads were bought, leased, or in other ways had their track come under ownership or lease by the Atlantic Coast Line Railroad.

The Atlantic Coast Line Railroad later merged with the Seaboard Air Line Railroad to form the Seaboard Coast Line Railroad.

The Georgia Railroad was partly owned by the ACL.

The ACL gained stock control of the Louisville and Nashville Railroad in 1902; see List of Louisville and Nashville Railroad precursors.

== Atlanta, Birmingham and Coast Railroad ==
- Atlanta, Birmingham and Atlantic Railway
  - Atlanta, Birmingham and Atlantic Railroad
    - Alabama Northern Railway
    - Alabama Terminal Railroad
    - Atlantic and Birmingham Railway
      - Tifton, Thomasville and Gulf Railway
      - Tifton and Northeastern Railroad
      - Atlantic and Birmingham Railroad
        - Waycross Air Line Railroad
      - Brunswick and Birmingham Railroad

== Atlantic Coast Line Railroad of Virginia ==
=== Atlantic Coast Line Railroad of South Carolina ===
==== Central Railroad of South Carolina ====
- Williamsburg Railroad

==== Cheraw and Darlington Railroad ====
- Cheraw and Salisbury Railroad
  - Cheraw and Coalfields Railroad
- Hartsville Railroad

==== Florence Railroad ====
- No precursors

==== Manchester and Augusta Railroad ====
- Charleston and Northern Railroad
  - Charleston, Sumter and Northern Railroad
    - Eutawville Railroad
- South and North Carolina Railroad
  - Bishopville Railroad

==== Northeastern Railroad ====
- No precursors

==== Wilmington, Columbia and Augusta Railroad ====
- Columbia and Sumter Railroad
- Wilmington and Carolina Railroad
  - Wilmington and Manchester Railroad
    - Wilmington Railway Bridge Company
- Wilmington and Conway Railroad
  - Wilmington, Chadbourn and Conway Railroad
    - Wilmington, Chadbourn and Conwayboro Railroad

=== Norfolk and Carolina Railroad ===
- Chowan and Southern Railroad
  - Western Branch Railway

=== Richmond and Petersburg Railroad ===
- Petersburg Railroad
  - Greenville and Roanoke Railroad
  - Petersburg and Western Railroad
    - Petersburg and Asylum Railway

=== Wilmington and Weldon Railroad ===
- Albemarle and Raleigh Railroad
  - Seaboard and Raleigh Railroad
    - Williamston and Tarboro Railroad
- Clinton and Warsaw Railroad
  - Clinton and Faison Railroad
- Midland North Carolina Railway
- Southeastern Railroad
- Wilmington and Newbern Railroad
  - Wilmington, Newbern and Norfolk Railroad
    - East Carolina Land and Railway Company
    - Wilmington, Onslow and East Carolina Railroad
- Wilmington and Raleigh Railroad
  - Halifax and Weldon Railroad

== Charleston and Western Carolina Railway ==
- Augusta Terminal Company
- Port Royal and Augusta Railway
  - Port Royal Railroad
- Port Royal and Western Carolina Railway
  - Augusta and Knoxville Railroad
  - Greenville and Laurens Railroad
  - Greenwood, Laurens and Spartanburg Railroad
  - Savannah Valley Railroad

== Conway Coast and Western Railroad ==
- Conway Seashore Railroad

== Florida Central Railroad ==
- No precursors

== Florida Midland Railway ==
- No precursors

== Florida Southern Railroad ==
- Florida Southern Railway
  - Gainesville, Ocala and Charlotte Harbor Railroad
- St. Johns and Lake Eustis Railway (leased)
- Yalaha and Western Railroad

== St. Johns and Lake Eustis Railroad ==
- St. Johns and Lake Eustis Railway

== Sanford and St. Petersburg Railway ==
- Orange Belt Railway

== Savannah, Florida and Western Railway ==
- Abbeville Southern Railway
- Alabama Midland Railway
  - Northwestern and Florida Railroad
    - Montgomery and Florida Railway
      - Montgomery Southern Railway
- Albany and Gulf Railroad
- Ashley River Railroad
- Atlantic and Gulf Railroad
  - Pensacola and Georgia Railroad (only sold to Atlantic and Gulf Railroad from Live Oak, Florida to the Florida/Georgia state line)
  - Savannah, Albany and Gulf Railroad
    - Savannah and Albany Railroad
  - South Georgia and Florida Railroad
- Brunswick and Western Railroad
  - Brunswick and Albany Railroad
    - Brunswick and Florida Railroad
- Charleston and Savannah Railway
  - Savannah and Charleston Railroad
    - Charleston and Savannah Railroad
- Chattahoochee and East Pass Railway
- East Florida Railway
- Green Pond, Walterboro and Branchville Railroad
  - Greenpond, Walterboro and Branchville Railway
    - Walterboro and Western Railroad
- Jacksonville and St. Johns River Railway
  - Jacksonville, Tampa and Key West Railway
    - Atlantic Coast, St. Johns and Indian River Railway (later sold to the Florida East Coast Railway)
    - DeLand and St. John's River Railroad
      - Orange Ridge, DeLand and Atlantic Railroad
    - Jupiter and Lake Worth Railroad
    - Palatka and Indian River Railway
    - Tampa, Peace Creek and St. Johns River Railroad
- Live Oak and Rowland's Bluff Railroad
- Live Oak, Tampa and Charlotte Harbor Railroad
- Sanford and Lake Eustis Railroad
- Silver Springs, Ocala and Gulf Railroad
- South Florida Railroad
  - Apopka and Atlantic Railroad
  - Sanford and Indian River Railroad
  - St. Cloud and Sugar Belt Railway
- Southwestern Alabama Railway
- Tampa and Thonotosassa Railroad
- Waycross and Florida Railroad

== Winston and Bone Valley Railroad ==
- Winston Railroad and Lumber Company

== Unknown ==
- East Carolina Railway
- Petersburg and Weldon Railroad

== See also ==
- List of Seaboard Air Line Railroad precursors
