= Florence—Robbins Line =

Atlantic Coast Line Railroad line in South Carolina

Overview
- Other name: Augusta Subdivision
- Status: Some segments are still operating
- Owner: Atlantic Coast Line Railroad (1902–1967); Seaboard Coast Line Railroad (1967–1986)
- Locale: South Carolina

Technical
- Track gauge: 1,435 mm (4 ft 8 1/2 in) standard gauge
- Electrification: No
- Signalling: None

The Atlantic Coast Line Railroad's Florence—Robbins Line (K Line) was one of the company's secondary main lines that ran from Florence, South Carolina to Robbins (just east of Augusta, Georgia). It was built in the late 1800s and large parts of it were built by the Atlantic Coast Line's predecessor companies. Parts of the line are still in service.

== Route description ==
The Florence—Robbins Line began in Florence, South Carolina at a junction with the Atlantic Coast Line's Main Line. From Florence, it ran west-southwest to Sumter, which was a hub for the company and a connection with some of their other lines.

From Sumter, the line continued southwest to Denmark and Cope before coming to an end at Robbins (just east of Augusta, Georgia), where it connected with the Charleston and Western Carolina Railway (an Atlantic Coast Line subsidiary).

The line's Creston Branch ran from the line at Creston east along the Santee River to Eutawville. From there, it turned south to Pregnall where it connected to the South Carolina Railroad.

== History ==
The first segment of the Florence—Robbins Line was built from Florence to Sumter by the Wilmington and Manchester Railroad in 1853.

From Sumter to Denmark, it was built by the Manchester and Augusta Railroad. The Manchester and Augusta Railroad was chartered in 1870, but it was not completed until 1899. The Creston Branch was chartered and built by the Eutawville Railroad in 1885. The Manchester and Augusta Railroad gained ownership of the Eutawville Railroad in 1887 and by 1890, its name was changed to the Charleston, Sumter and Northern Railroad.

By the time it was complete in 1889, the Manchester and Augusta Railroad, along with the Wilmington and Manchester Railroad and the Charleston, Sumter and Northern Railroad, were all considered to be part of the group of independent railroads known as the Atlantic Coast Line. The lines were formally merged into the Atlantic Coast Line Railroad in 1898.

On June 30, 1899, the Atlantic Coast Line extended the line from Denmark south to connect with Charleston and Western Carolina Railway (C&WC) at Robbins. The C&WC was owned by the Atlantic Coast Line Railroad and operated as a subsidiary. By then, the Atlantic Coast Line classified the line from Florence to Robbins as their K Line and trains would continue from Robbins on the C&WC to Augusta, Georgia.

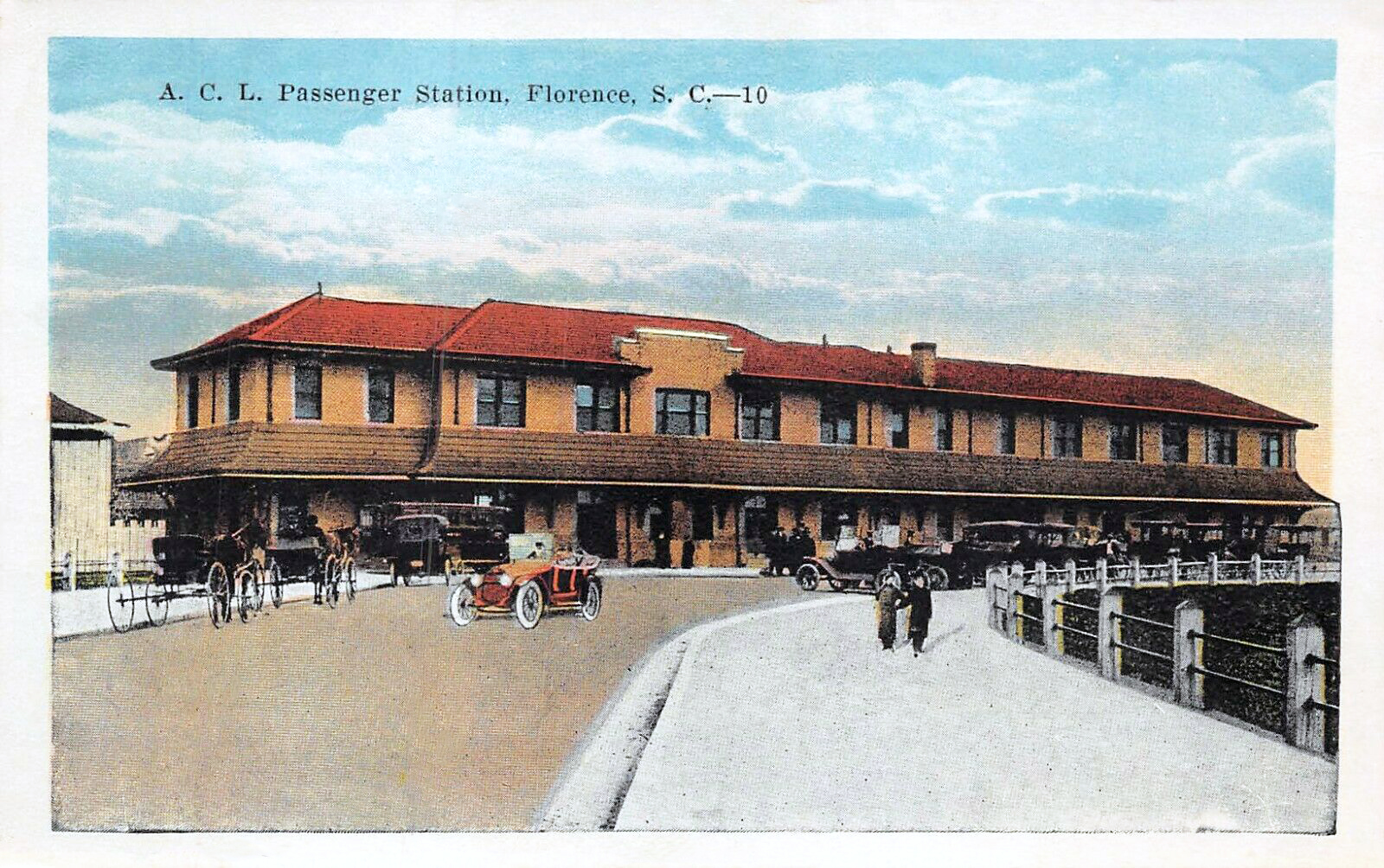
Florence ACL depot at the east end of the line

By 1949, the Atlantic Coast Line operated two daily passengers trains and two daily through freight trains on the line from Florence to Augusta. Additional local freight trains also ran the line from Florence to Sumter and from Sumter to Augusta as well. Local freight trains ran the Creston Branch six days a week at this time as well.

In 1959, the Atlantic Coast Line Railroad fully merged the Charleston and Western Carolina Railway into its network. The Atlantic Coast Line then annexed the former C&WC from Robbins to Spartanburg, South Carolina to the K Line, which then became known as the Florence—Spartanburg Line. The two daily passenger trains, one daily through freight, and other local freight trains continued to run from Florence to Augusta through the 1960s with separate freight trains running from Augusta to Spartanburg.

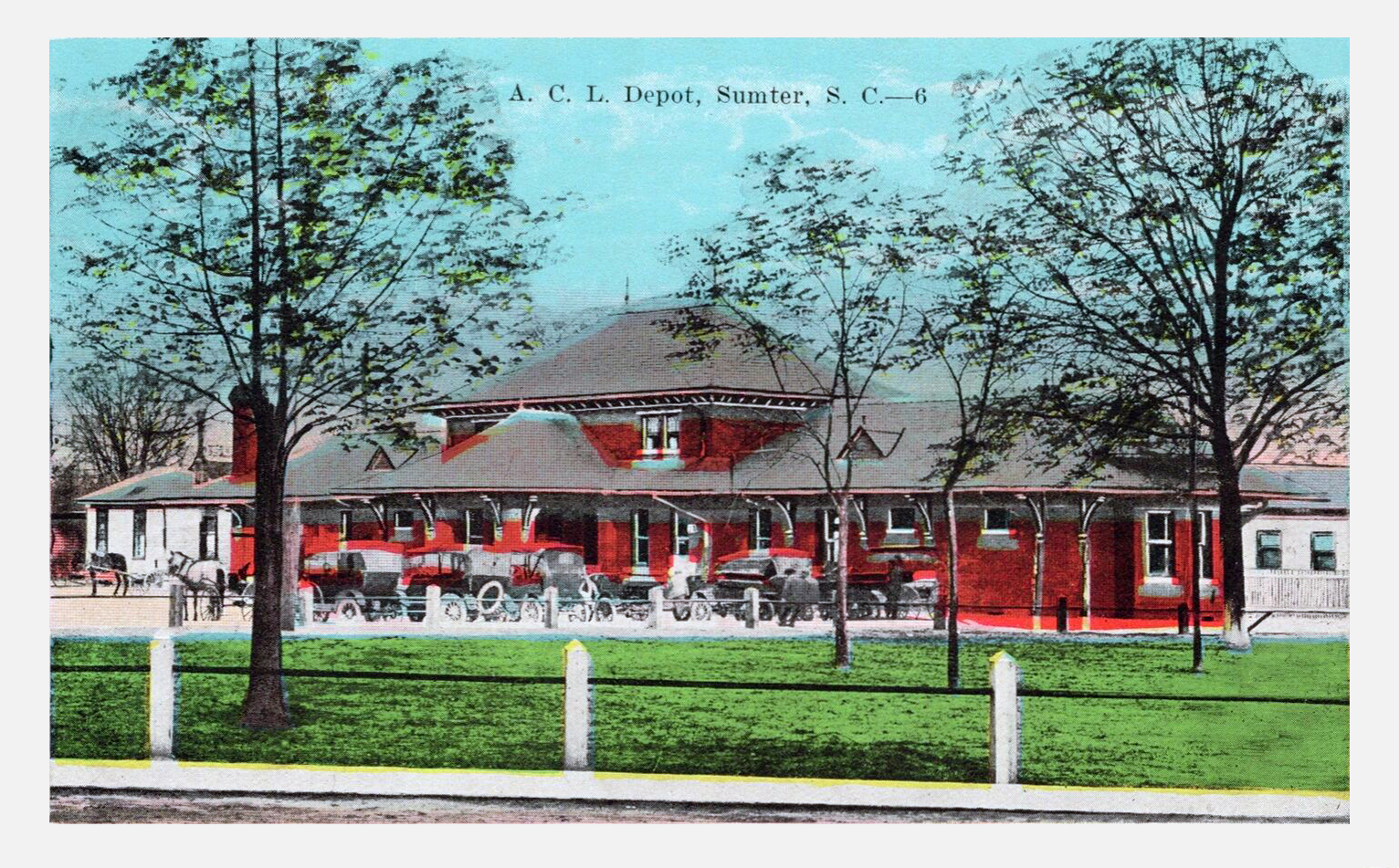
Sumter ACL depot

The Atlantic Coast Line became the Seaboard Coast Line Railroad (SCL) in 1967 after merging with their rival, the Seaboard Air Line Railroad (SAL). After the merger, the line from Florence to Augusta operated as their Augusta Subdivision. By 1971, only freight trains were operating on the line.

In 1980, the Seaboard Coast Line's parent company merged with the Chessie System, creating the CSX Corporation. The CSX Corporation initially operated the Chessie and Seaboard Systems separately until 1986, when they were merged into CSX Transportation. In the 1980s, CSX abandoned the line at the south end from just north of Robbins to Cope. Further north, CSX abandoned the line from Timmonsville to Lynchburg in 1989, which severed it as a through route from Florence to Sumter. Two years later, it was abandoned from Florence to Timmonsville. The segment from Sumter to Lynchburg was abandoned in 1992.

== Current conditions ==
=== Orangeburg Subdivision ===
Today, the line is still in service from just north of Sumter to Cope. It is now CSX's Orangeburg Subdivision. It is still connected to CSX's A Line (the former Atlantic Coast Line Railroad main line) via the Lane Subdivision. The line's former designation, the Augusta Subdivision, is now used for the former Charleston and Western Carolina Railway from Augusta to Yemassee.

=== Creston Subdivision ===
The Creston Branch is still in service and is now CSX's Creston Subdivision. It connects with Norfolk Southern Railway's SC Line at Pregnall.

== Historic stations ==
Florence to Robbins
Milepost	City/Location	Station	Connections and notes
AK 292.7	Florence	Florence	junction with: Atlantic Coast Line Railroad Main Line; Atlantic Coast Line Railroad Wadesboro—Florence Line; South Carolina Western Railway (SAL)
AK 295.7		Revell	
AK 304.6	Timmonsville	Timmonsville	junction with Seaboard Air Line Railroad Timmonsville Subdivision
AK 310.2	Cartersville	Cartersville	
AK 313.9	Lynchburg	Lynchburg	
AK 322.9	Mayesville	Mayesville	
AK 332.0	Sumter	Sumter	junction with: Sumter—Columbia Line; Sumter–Lanes Line; Parkton—Sumter Line
AK 339.0	Privateer	Privateer	
AK 346.0	Pinewood	Pinewood	
AK 351.6		Remini	
AK 357.6	Lone Star	Lone Star	
AK 361.4		Creston	junction with Creston Branch
AK 366.3	Cameron	Cameron	
AK 376.0	Orangeburg	Orangeburg	junction with Norfolk Southern Railway Charleston District (SOU)
AK 377.9		Edistone	
AK 387.3	Cope	Cope	
AK 396.3	Denmark	Denmark	junction with: Southern Railway Augusta–Charleston Line; Seaboard Air Line Railroad Main Line
AK 403.2	Hilda	Hilda	
AK 410.4	Barnwell	Barnwell	
AK 418.8		Donora	
AK 421.2		Snapp	
AK 431.2		Robbins	junction with Charleston and Western Carolina Railway (ACL)

Creston Branch
Milepost	City/Location	Station	Connections and notes
AKE 361.4		Creston	junction with Florence—Robbins Line
AKE 368.2	Elloree	Elloree	
AKE 384.5	Eutawville	Eutawville	
AKE 390.7	Holly Hill	Holly Hill	
AKE 393.8		Cementon	
AKE 396.6		Giant	
AKE 398.8	Harleyville	Harleyville	
AKE 403.0		Pregnall	junction with South Carolina Railroad (SOU)
