= Columbia and Sumter Railroad =

Railroad in South Carolina, United States

Overview
- Dates of operation: 1866–1870
- Successor: Wilmington and Carolina Railroad

Technical
- Track gauge: 5 ft (1,524 mm)

The Columbia and Sumter Railroad was a railroad in South Carolina running between those two cities that began operating immediately after the American Civil War. It later became part of the Atlantic Coast Line Railroad network. The railroad is still in service today and it is now operated by CSX Transportation as their Eastover Subdivision.

== History ==
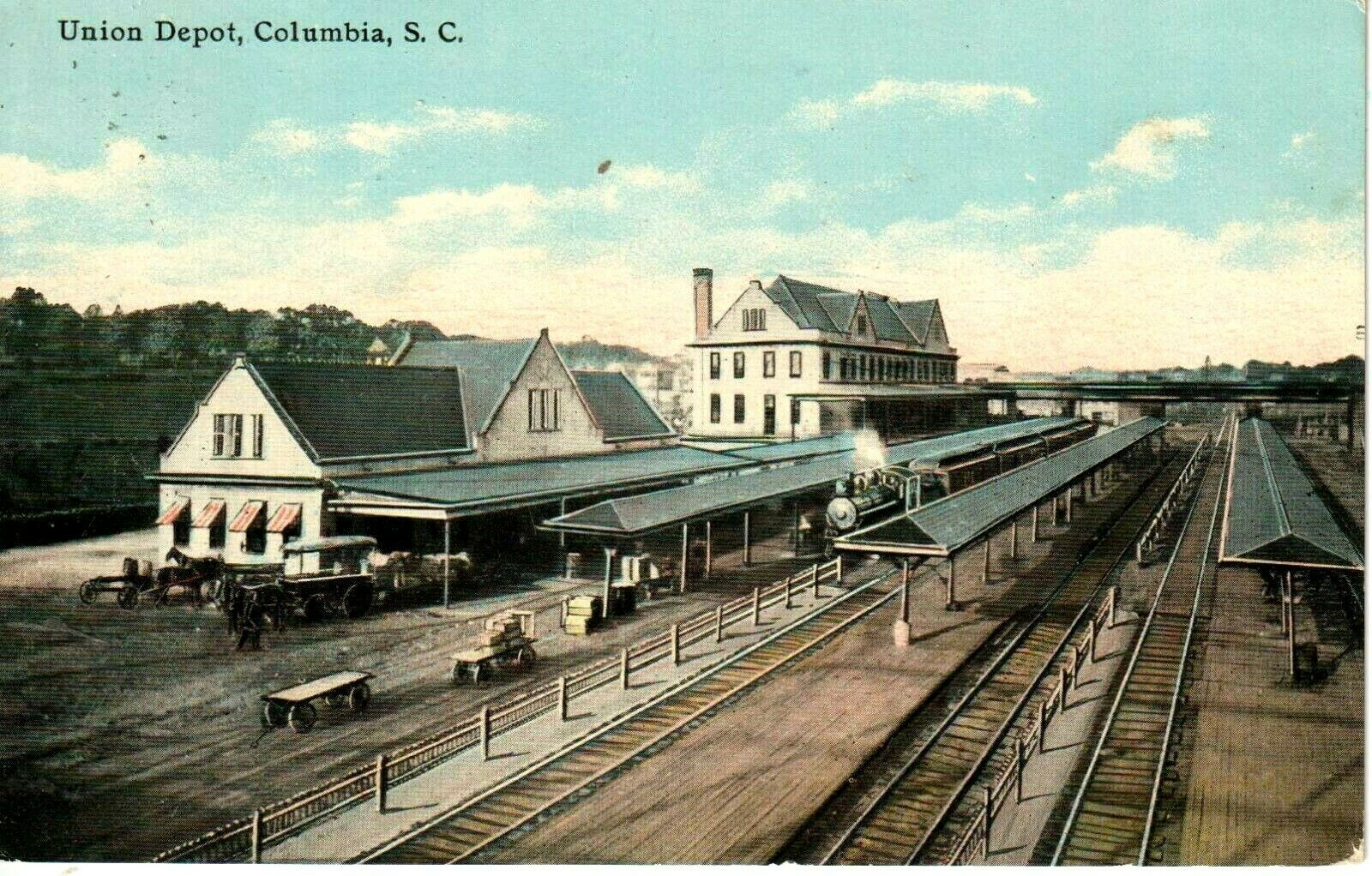
Columbia Union Depot

The Columbia and Sumter Railroad was chartered by the South Carolina General Assembly in 1866, shortly after the American Civil War. It only briefly operated as an independent railroad before it was sold to the Wilmington, Columbia and Augusta Railroad (the successor to the Wilmington and Manchester Railroad) in 1870.

The Wilmington, Columbia and Augusta lasted until 1898 when it was absorbed into the Atlantic Coast Line Railroad. The Atlantic Coast Line Railroad operated the line for many years as their Sumter—Columbia Line and they operated both passenger and freight service. Sumter was a major hub for the Atlantic Coast Line Railroad. By 1902, passenger trains began operating to Columbia's newly-built Union Station along with the Southern Railway.

In the 1950s, the Atlantic Coast Line was operating a daily local passenger train on the line and two daily through freight trains. An additional local freight train also ran the line six days a week at the same time.

The Atlantic Coast Line became the Seaboard Coast Line Railroad (SCL) in 1967 after merging with their rival, the Seaboard Air Line Railroad (SAL). The Seaboard Coast Line adopted the Seaboard Air Line's method of naming their lines as subdivisions and company gave the line its current designation, the Eastover Subdivision. By 1971, only freight trains were operating on the line.

In 1980, the Seaboard Coast Line's parent company merged with the Chessie System, creating the CSX Corporation. The CSX Corporation initially operated the Chessie and Seaboard Systems separately until 1986, when they were merged into CSX Transportation.

== Current operations ==
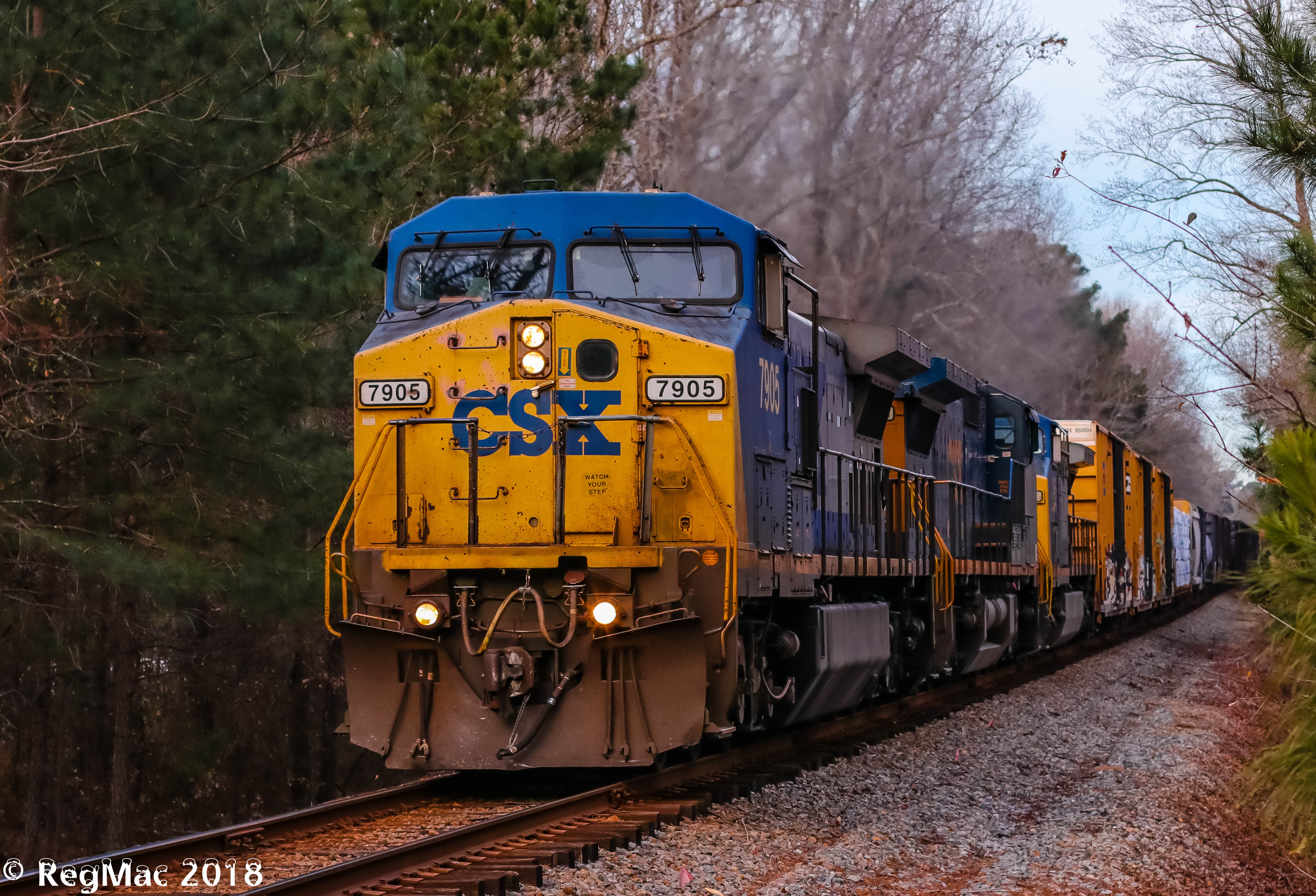
A current CSX freight train on the Eastover Subdivision in Columbia, South Carolina.

CSX still operates the Eastover Subdivision today. It connects with CSX's S Line (Columbia Subdivision) and a couple of Norfolk Southern Railway (the successor to the Southern Railway) lines in Columbia. The Eastover Subdivision notably serves a Sylvamo paper mill near Eastover.

== Historic stations ==
Milepost	City/Location	Station	Connections and notes
AKA 332.0	Sumter	Sumter	junction with: Florence—Robbins Line; Sumter–Lanes Line; Parkton—Sumter Line
AKA 338.3		Cane Savannah	
AKA 342.0		Wedgefield	
AKA 344.3		Foxville	junction with Charleston, Cincinnati and Chicago Railroad (SOU)
AKA 346.2		Malta	
AKA 350.3		Acton	
AKA 352.7	Eastover	Eastover	
AKA 359.2		Congaree	
AKA 365.6		Lykes	
AKA 368.5		Sims	
AKA 372.0		Andrews	
AKA 374.9	Columbia	Columbia Union Station	junction with: Seaboard Air Line Railroad Main Line; Charlotte, Columbia and Augusta Railroad (SOU); Spartanburg, Union and Columbia Railroad (SOU); Carolina Midland Railway (SOU)
