= Palmetto Railways =

Publicly owned Class III railroad

Overview
- Headquarters: Charleston, SC
- Reporting mark: PR
- Locale: South Carolina Lowcountry
- Predecessors: South Carolina Public Railways, East Cooper & Berkeley Railroad

Technical
- Track gauge: 4 ft 8 1/2 in (1435 mm) (standard gauge)

Palmetto Railways (reporting mark PR) is a publicly owned Class III railroad which operates four isolated subdivisions, mostly situated around Charleston, South Carolina. The railroad was formed in 2013 from a consolidation of track and equipment owned by South Carolina Public Railways (SCPR) and the East Cooper & Berkeley Railroad (ECBR), and has since acquired sections of the Hampton & Branchville Railroad. Connections are made with CSX in Charleston, Hampton, and Cordesville and the Norfolk Southern Railway in Charleston.

== History ==
The earliest historical predecessor to Palmetto Railways is the East Shore Terminal Company, which had completed a 3-mile railroad spur connecting the Charleston waterfront with other railroads by 1892. It entered receivership under W. E. Huger in 1896, and foreclosed in 1903, when the wharves, warehouses and track were sold to form the Charleston Terminal Company.

== Motive Power ==
Palmetto Railways operates exclusively EMD locomotives. Previously, 1003 was applied to an ex-Seaboard Air Line Alco S2 (originally 1431).

Road No.	Model	Build Date
1001	SW1001	1975
1002	SW1001	1977
1003	SW1001	1977
2001	GP16	1952
2003	GP16	1956
2004	GP20	1961
2005	GP20	1961
2006	GP16	1952
2007	GP20	1961
2008	GP20	1960
3501	GP35	1964
3503	GP35	1964
3801	GP38-2	1973
