= South and North Carolina Railroad =

Railroad in Carolina, USA

Overview
- Dates of operation: 1892–1898
- Successor: Manchester and Augusta Railroad; Atlantic Coast Line Railroad

The South and North Carolina Railroad was a railroad that served South Carolina in the late 19th century.

== History ==
The line had been chartered by the South Carolina General Assembly in 1882 under the name of the Bishopville Railroad Company.

Around the time the 19-mile line was opened around 1892, its name was changed to the South and North Carolina Railroad.

The line was sold to the Manchester and Augusta Railroad Company on January 1, 1896, and became part of the Atlantic Coast Line Railroad in 1898. It became the Atlantic Coast Line's Bishopville Branch.

== Historic stations ==
Miles from Elliott	City/Location	Station	Connections and notes
5.0		Atkins	junction with Wilmington and Manchester Railroad (ACL)
0.0		Elliott	junction with Charleston, Sumter and Northern Railroad (ACL)
3.4		Wisacky	
8.7	Bishopville	Bishopville	junction with South Carolina Western Railway (SAL)
16.5		Lucknow	
