= Cincinnati and Charleston Railroad =

The Cincinnati and Charleston Railroad was incorporated by the South Carolina General Assembly to build a railroad line between Charleston, South Carolina, and Cincinnati, Ohio.

The following year, the company changed its name to the Louisville, Cincinnati and Charleston Railroad, and later became the South Carolina Railroad.
