= Columbia and Augusta Railroad =

Overview
- Dates of operation: 1854–1869
- Successor: Charlotte, Columbia and Augusta Railroad

Technical
- Track gauge: 5 ft (1,524 mm)

The Columbia and Augusta Railroad was begun in 1854 by Col. James Guignard Gibbes, 1829–1903, but was not completed until after the American Civil War of 1861–1865.

The company was originally chartered in South Carolina as the Columbia and Hamburg Railroad. But its name was changed to Columbia and Augusta Railroad in December 1863 before any track was laid on the route, as the importance of Hamburg, South Carolina, as an economic center was already on the decline. In 1869, it was merged with the Charlotte and South Carolina Railroad to form the Charlotte, Columbia and Augusta Railroad.

== See also ==
- Wilmington, Columbia and Augusta Railroad
