= Spartanburg and Union Railroad =

The Spartanburg and Union Railroad was a 5 ft (1,524 mm) gauge shortline railroad that served the South Carolina Upstate region before, during and after the American Civil War.

The company secured a charter from the South Carolina General Assembly in 1847 to build a line from Alston, South Carolina, on the Greenville and Columbia Railroad line, to Spartanburg, South Carolina.

Unable to raise enough capital on its own, the line turned to the state for financial assistance in 1850. Construction began in 1853, with the goal of grading the entire 60-mile (97 km) stretch at once. This proved taxing on company coffers and by the fall of 1856, while some 40 miles (64 km) of track had been laid and the carrier began handling traffic, material for the remainder was wanting and the line was still not making money. A bond offering by the company to raise more money was hurt by the Panic of 1857 and the company was forced to petition the state to issue bonds.

The state of South Carolina backed the issuance of 6 percent bonds to aid in the building of the road. The Spartanburg and Union was able to raise enough capital to complete the line by 1859. The total cost was approximately $1.25 million, of which the state contributed nearly half through stock subscriptions and bonds.

Like many South Carolina railroads, the Spartanburg and Union felt the wrath of invading Union forces during the American Civil War. The line suffered significant damage when Maj. Gen. William T. Sherman's troops ravaged the state in 1865.

Around 1878, it became the Spartanburg, Union and Columbia Railroad and later was incorporated into the Southern Railway.
