= Orangeburg =

Orangeburg may refer to:

== Places ==
- Orangeburg, New York
- Orangeburg, South Carolina
  - Orangeburg County, South Carolina
- Orangeburg Municipal Airport, a public airport
- Orangeburg Railway, a defunct shortline railroad

== Other ==
- Orangeburg Dodgers, a former minor league baseball team
- Orangeburg pipe, a type of pipe made from tar paper
- Orangeburg massacre, an incident on February 8, 1968
