= Green Pond, Walterboro and Branchville Railroad =

Overview
- Dates of operation: 1887–1902
- Successor: Plant System; Atlantic Coast Line Railroad; Seaboard Coast Line Railroad

Technical
- Track gauge: 4 ft 8 1/2 in (1,435 mm) standard gauge

The Green Pond, Walterboro and Branchville Railroad was a railroad that ran from Green Pond, South Carolina northwest to Ehrhardt, South Carolina.

== History ==
The line was originally known as the Green Pond, Walterboro and Branchville Railway, which built the line from Green Pond to Walterboro in 1887. In 1896, the Walterboro and Western Railway extended the line from Waterboro to Ehrhardt. In 1900, the Green Pond, Walterboro and Branchville Railway and the Walterboro and Western Railway were merged into a single line named the Green Pond, Walterboro and Branchville Railroad.

At Green Pond, the line connected with the Charleston and Savannah Railway, which had been part of the Savannah, Florida and Western Railway, the railroad network of Henry B. Plant since the late 1880s. In 1901, the Green Pond, Walterboro and Branchville Railroad was also consolidated into the Savannah, Florida and Western Railway.

In 1902 the Atlantic Coast Line Railroad acquired the Savannah, Florida and Western Railway. The Atlantic Coast Line would operate the line as their Walterboro Branch (the former Charleston and Savannah Railway became the Atlantic Coast Line's Main Line). In 1962, a spur was built from Stokes to South Carolina Electric & Gas Company's newly-built power plant in Canadys.

In 1967, the Atlantic Coast Line merged with its rival, the Seaboard Air Line Railroad. The merged company was named the Seaboard Coast Line Railroad. The Seaboard Coast Line would operate the line as their Walterboro Subdivision. By the early 1980s, the line was abandoned from H&B Junction to Ehrhardt.

In 1980, the Seaboard Coast Line's parent company merged with the Chessie System, creating the CSX Corporation. The CSX Corporation initially operated the Chessie and Seaboard Systems separately until 1986, when they were merged into CSX Transportation. In the late 1980s, CSX abandoned the line from Green Pond to Stokes and the remaining track was sold to the Hampton and Branchville Railroad (H&B), which is owned by Palmetto Railways. The H&B used the line to continue to serve the power plant in Canadys until the plant shut down in 2013. The line has been dormant ever since.

== Historic stations ==
Milepost	City/Location	Station	Connections and notes
AMF 429.0		Green Pond	junction with Charleston and Savannah Railway (SF&W/ACL)
AMF 433.2		Ritter	
AMF 440.9	Walterboro	Walterboro	
AMF 446.6		Stokes	junction with spur to Canadys
AMG 456.0		Canadys	located on spur
AMF 452.8	Ruffin	Ruffin	
AMF 455.3	Williams	Williams	
AMF 460.8		H&B Junction	junction with Hampton and Branchville Railroad
AMF 462.5	Lodge	Lodge	
AMF 466.9	Ehrhardt	Ehrhardt	junction with Bamberg, Ehrhardt and Walterboro Railway (ACL)
