= Blackville, Alston and Newberry Railroad =

American railroad

The Blackville, Alston and Newberry Railroad was a railroad that served South Carolina in the latter part of the 19th century.

The original intent of the Blackville, Alston and Newberry was for development of kaolin clay mines in Aiken County. With the Blackville, Alston and Newberry, the white clay, used in the production of porcelain and papermaking, could be transferred at Blackville to the South Carolina and Georgia Railroad, and onto outside markets.

Construction started in Blackville about 1886 and a line was completed to Sievern in 1888.

While the kaolin mining venture did not pan out immediately, the new railroad lifted the area's turpentine and pine lumber industries. Cotton, asparagus and watermelon growers also did extremely well, with the Blackville, Alston and Newberry helping the region enjoy economic prosperity.

In 1891, the Carolina Midland Railway acquired the Blackville, Alston and Newberry's Perry-to-Blackville line, consolidating it with the recently acquired Barnwell Railway.

In 1895, the Blackville, Alston and Newberry declared bankruptcy.
