= Blackville and Alston Railroad =

Defunct railroad in South Carolina. U.S.

The Blackville and Alston Railroad was a South Carolina railroad company chartered in the latter half of the 19th century.

The Blackville and Alston Railroad was chartered by the South Carolina General Assembly in 1885. Its name was changed to the Blackville, Alston and Newberry Railroad a year later.
