= Gerald C. Smoak =

American politician (1930–2018)

Member of the South Carolina House of Representatives from the Colleton County district
- In office 1971–1972

Personal details
- Born: September 18, 1930 Canadys, Colleton County, South Carolina
- Died: December 7, 2018 (aged 88)
- Party: Democratic
- Occupation: lawyer, judge

Gerald Clarence Smoak, Sr. (September 18, 1930 – December 7, 2018) was an American politician in the state of South Carolina. He served in the South Carolina House of Representatives from 1967 to 1970, representing Colleton County, South Carolina. He is a lawyer and former judge.
