= Hampton and Branchville Railroad and Lumber Company =

The Hampton and Branchville Railroad and Lumber Company was a shortline railroad that served Western South Carolina in the early 20th century.

The Hampton and Branchville Railroad and Lumber Company was chartered by the South Carolina General Assembly in 1891. The charter called for the carrier to build a line the Savannah River below Hamburg, South Carolina, through the town of Hampton, South Carolina, and the counties of Hampton, Colleton, and Orangeburg. It also was to extend onto Sumter, South Carolina.

The first records of the carrier date from January 1, 1901, at which time its line stretched from Hampton to a connection with the Atlantic Coast Line Railroad Branchville Junction, South Carolina, 16 miles away. By 1909, an eight-mile extension from Hampton to Smoaks, South Carolina, was completed and opened for operation.

The Hampton and Branchville Railroad and Lumber Company changed its name to the Hampton and Branchville Railroad in the 1920s. Today, the Hampton and Branchville operates freight services from a CSX connection at Hampton to Canadys, South Carolina, about 40 miles away.

The line is owned by the Lightsey family.
