= Southern Railway – Carolina Division =

American railroad

Overview
- Parent company: Southern Railway (1899-1982); Norfolk Southern Railway (1982-1996)
- Locale: South Carolina
- Dates of operation: 1899; 127 years ago – 1996; 30 years ago
- Predecessor: South Carolina and Georgia Railroad
- Successor: Norfolk Southern Railway

Technical
- Track gauge: 4 ft 8 1/2 in (1,435 mm) standard gauge

The Southern Railway – Carolina Division was one of the first railroads chartered in the United States.

The South Carolina Canal and Rail Road Company was chartered in South Carolina in 1827, eventually building a 136-mile (219 km) line from Charleston, South Carolina, to Hamburg, South Carolina. It merged with the Louisville, Cincinnati and Charleston Railroad in 1843 to become the South Carolina Railroad.

In 1881, the line was reorganized as the South Carolina Railway. After entering receivership in 1889, it was reorganized once again five years later as the South Carolina and Georgia Railroad.

Southern Railway gained control of the line in 1899. The South Carolina and Georgia Railroad remained separate corporation until May 1902, when it was consolidated with several other lines controlled by Southern.

Southern Railway obtained a 999-year lease of the line in 1902, which is still in effect.

In December 1990, the Southern changed its name to Norfolk Southern Railway. In 1996, the Southern Railway – Carolina Division merged into the renamed Norfolk Southern Railway, bringing an end to the Southern Railway – Carolina Division.
