= Colleton County Railroad =

The Colleton County Railroad was a shortline railroad in Colleton County, South Carolina that existed briefly in the mid-1980s. It was organized in 1986 to take over a Seaboard System branch line. In 1988, it was merged into the Hampton and Branchville Railroad.

== See also ==
- Hampton and Branchville Railroad
