= Aiken Railway =

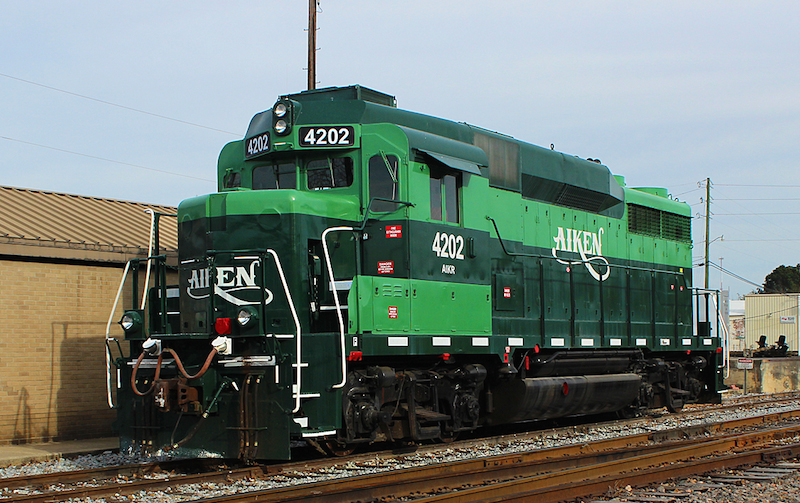
- AIKR 4202 locomotive

Overview
- Headquarters: Aiken, South Carolina
- Reporting mark: AIKR
- Locale: Southwestern South Carolina
- Dates of operation: 2012–present

Technical
- Track gauge: 4 ft 8 1/2 in (1,435 mm) standard gauge

Launched in 2012, The Aiken Railway (reporting mark AIKR) is a short line railroad operating 19 miles of track leased from Norfolk Southern in southwestern South Carolina, in the United States. The leased track consists of 12.45 miles between Warrenville and Oakwood, and 6.45 miles between Aiken and North Aiken. The Aiken Railway is a wholly owned subsidiary of Western Carolina Railway Service Corporation which also owns the Greenville & Western Railway.

== History ==
The Aiken Railway has roots going all the way back to 1827 when the South Carolina General Assembly chartered the South Carolina Canal and Railroad Company, one of the first railroads in the United States and the longest railroad in the world - 136 miles - at its inception. Aiken itself was founded as a stopover on the SCC&RR, which was completed in 1833. The second line to North Aiken, South Carolina was built in 1879 as a portion of the Edgefield, Trenton, & Aiken Railroad. Both railroads went through several mergers and eventually became part of Southern Railway. The ET&A's successor was purchased in 1898, and the SCC&RR's the following year. In 2012, Western Carolina Railway Service, entered into a lease agreement with Southern's successor NS to create the Aiken Railway. Both lines of the AIKR are the only remaining active segments of their original railroads.

== Route ==
Aiken Railway operates 2 lines:

- Warrenville Line
  - Runs from Warrenville, South Carolina to just east of Montmorenci, South Carolina
- North Aiken Line
  - Runs from Aiken, South Carolina to North Aiken, South Carolina

Aiken Railway interchanges with Norfolk Southern at Warrenville, South Carolina.

== Roster ==
As of July 2014, the AIKR fleet consists of two locomotives, 4201 and 4202, both of which are EMD GP30s built in 1963. At its founding, an EMD SW1500 was temporarily leased from Larry's Truck and Electric before the purchase of 4201 and 4202 from fellow WCRSC subsidiary Greenville & Western but has since been returned.
