= South Carolina Terminal Company =

The South Carolina Terminal Company was a transportation company that operated along the Charleston, South Carolina, waterfront in the late 19th century and early 20th century.

The South Carolina Terminal Company was chartered by the South Carolina General Assembly in 1893.

The company began operation the following year, operating in the waterfront area of Charleston, South Carolina, and the surrounding county, by purchasing the property of the New York and Charleston Warehouse and Steam Navigation Company, which was in foreclosure.

By 1903, the Charleston Terminal Company had acquired the South Carolina Terminal Company's waterfront property and terminals.
