= Central Railroad of South Carolina =

Overview
- Dates of operation: 1882–
- Successor: Atlantic Coast Line Railroad

Technical
- Track gauge: 4 ft 8 1/2 in (1,435 mm) standard gauge

The Central Railroad of South Carolina was a South Carolina railroad that operated following Reconstruction. It ran between the town of Lane (also known as Lanes) and Sumter, a distance of about 40 miles (64 km). The line is in service today as CSX's Lane Subdivision.

== History ==
The Central of South Carolina was chartered by the South Carolina General Assembly in 1876 under the Williamsburg Railroad moniker, but the name was changed shortly thereafter to Central Railroad of South Carolina. The line opened in 1882.

=== Ownership and leases ===
The line was leased to the Wilmington, Columbia and Augusta Railroad and the Northeastern Railroad, to which it connected on each end. The two lessees agreed to pay all taxes, keep the line in good repair and pay a rental rate of $30,000 annually.

The Central of South Carolina was owned by the Atlantic Coast Line Railroad beginning around 1900. It was listed on Atlantic Coast Line employee timetables as their Sumter–Lanes Line (L Line).

In 1967, the Atlantic Coast Line Railroad and Seaboard Air Line Railroad merged to form the Seaboard Coast Line Railroad. In 1980, the Seaboard Coast Line's parent company merged with the Chessie System, creating the CSX Corporation. The CSX Corporation operated the Chessie and Seaboard Systems separately until 1986, when they were merged into CSX Transportation.

== Current operations ==
The Central Railroad of South Carolina is still in service and is now CSX's Lane Subdivision. At its west end it connects to CSX's A Line (Charleston Subdivision), and at its east it connects to the Orangeburg Subdivision and the Eastover Subdivision.

== Historic stations ==
Milepost	City/Location	Station	Connections and notes
AL 342.5	Lane	Lane	also listed as Lanes on employee timetables junction with Northeastern Railroad (ACL)
AL 350.0	Greeleyville	Greeleyville	
AL 355.2	Foreston	Foreston	
AL 359.2		Wilson's Mill	
AL 364.6	Manning	Manning	
AL 368.0	Alcolu	Alcolu	junction with Alcolu Railroad
AL 373.0		Brogdon	
AL 376.0		Britton	
AL 382.2	Sumter	Sumter	junction with: Manchester and Augusta Railroad (ACL); Wilmington and Manchester Railroad (ACL)

== See also ==
- Alcolu Railroad
