= Charleston and Northern Railroad =

The Charleston and Northern Railroad was a South Carolina railroad company that existed briefly at the end of the 19th century.

The Charleston and Northern was created after the Atlantic Coast Line Railroad bought the Charleston, Sumter and Northern Railroad in October 1894, and the following year reorganized it under the Charleston and Northern Railroad to prevent it from being used by a competitor.

The line was originally chartered in 1885 by the South Carolina General Assembly as the Eutawville Railroad.

Its name was changed to the Charleston, Sumter and Northern in 1890 and went into receivership in 1892.

The Charleston and Northern was absorbed into the Atlantic Coast Line Railroad, apparently in 1895.
