= Carolina and Western Railroad =

Logging railroad

The Carolina and Western Railroad was a South Carolina logging railroad that operated in the early decades of the 20th century. Chartered in 1902, the Carolina and Western was built to serve the W.F. Cummings Company. According to Thomas Fetters' book Logging Railroads of South Carolina, lumber mill workers laid the rails; the mill shut down periodically, specifically to relocate or extend the line to reach new sources of timber. The lack of experience and haphazard development of the line made it dangerous, with a number of trains derailed. When lumberman Frank Cummings retired in 1916, he disbanded the railroad, along with his lumber and logging enterprises, bringing the Carolina and Western Railroad's life to an end.
