= Glenn Springs Railroad =

Former railroad in South Carolina

The Glenn Springs Railroad was a shortline railroad that operated in the South Carolina Upstate region in the late 19th century and early 20th century.

The Glenn Springs Railroad began in 1894 and ran between Roebuck, South Carolina, and Glenn Springs, South Carolina, a resort area.

The line owned a locomotive, combination car and passenger car. It made one round trip a day in the summer, except on Sunday, and three trips a week in the winter.

The Glenn Springs Railroad connected with the Charleston and Western Carolina Railway at Roebuck.

The Charleston and Western Carolina was part owner of the Glenn Springs Railroad for the latter's last eight years of its existence. It was abandoned in 1911.
