= Barnwell Railway =

The Barnwell Railway was a shortline railroad that served western South Carolina in the late 19th century.

It was built in 1882 and ran from Barnwell, South Carolina, to Blackville, South Carolina, a distance of 9 miles, in Aiken County. It was owned and operated by the South Carolina Railway, but its operations were kept separate.

In 1891, the Carolina Midland Railway acquired the Barnwell Railway and consolidated it with the Blackville, Alston and Newberry Railroad's Perry-to-Blackville line.
