= Piedmont and Northern Railway =

US railroad

Overview
- Headquarters: Charlotte, North Carolina
- Reporting mark: PN
- Locale: Upstate South Carolina, Western North Carolina
- Dates of operation: 1911–1969
- Predecessor: Piedmont Traction Company, Greenville, Spartanburg and Anderson Railway
- Successor: Seaboard Coast Line

Technical
- Track gauge: 4 ft 8 1/2 in (1,435 mm) standard gauge
- Electrification: 1500 volts DC (until 1954)
- Length: 128 miles (206 km)

The Piedmont & Northern Railway (reporting mark PN) was a heavy electric interurban company operating over two disconnected divisions in North and South Carolina. Tracks spanned 128 miles (206 km) total between the two segments, with the northern division running 24 miles (39 km) from Charlotte, to Gastonia, North Carolina, including a three-mile (5 km) spur to Belmont. The southern division main line ran 89 miles (143 km) from Greenwood to Spartanburg, South Carolina, with a 12 mi (19 km) spur to Anderson. Initially the railroad was electrified at 1500 volts DC, however, much of the electrification was abandoned when dieselisation was completed in 1954.

Unlike similar interurban systems the Piedmont & Northern survived the Great Depression and was later absorbed into the Seaboard Coast Line Railroad in 1969. Although part of the railroad was abandoned between Greenwood and Honea Path and Belton to Anderson, much of the original system exists today as shortlines.

== History ==
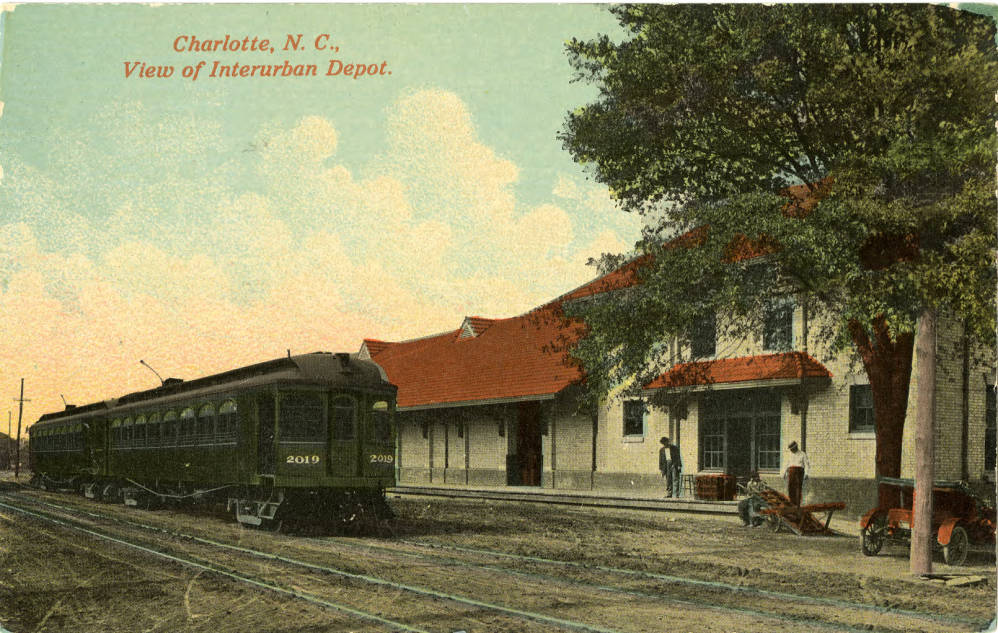
Postcard of Charlotte Interurban Depot

Although interurban railroads were not nearly as common in the sparsely populated and largely agrarian Deep South, there were a number of small electric networks constructed in the region throughout the early 20th century. Among them was the Anderson Traction Company, created on June 22, 1904, to build and operate within the city of Anderson. Eventually the railroad expanded to complete construction of an extension to Belton by 1910. The railroad was acquired by James B. Duke of Duke Power around the same time.

On March 20, 1909, the Greenville, Spartanburg and Anderson Railway was chartered and presided over by Duke. The company used the Anderson Traction Company rails terminating at Belton as a starting point for northward construction to Greenville and construction toward Greenwood to the south, with both cities connected in November 1912. An extension from Greenville to Spartanburg was completed in April 1914. The North Carolina division started with the Piedmont Traction Company, also owned by Duke, and completed its route between Charlotte and Gastonia, North Carolina on July 3, 1912.

Both sections were electrified to 1,500 volts DC with power supplied from mainly hydroelectric sources. Additionally both segments were built to steam road standards with minimal street running.

=== Consolidation ===
The Piedmont & Northern was created in 1914 to consolidate both the Greenville, Spartanburg & Anderson in South Carolina and the Piedmont Traction Company in North Carolina. In 1916 the railroad completed a 3-mile (4.8 km) spur to Belmont, North Carolina. On numerous occasions the company sought to link the two disconnected segments and expand to Durham, North Carolina, however, the plans never materialized due to stiff resistance from the Southern Railway, which the P&N paralleled in both states.

Although many railroads were hostile to the Piedmont & Northern, a friend was found with the Seaboard Air Line, which connected with the P&N at Charlotte and Greenwood. Throughout its existence the P&N stressed interchange traffic over its efficient electric lines, and with good reason: the railroad shared numerous interchanges with several major railroads.

=== Network ===
The P&N's network in 1964 was connected to the Clinchfield Railroad (CRR), Carolina and Northwestern Railway (Ca&NW), Georgia and Florida Railroad (G&F), Norfolk Southern (NS), Seaboard Air Line Railroad (SAL), Southern Railway (SOU), Atlantic Coast Line Railroad (ACL), Greenville and Northern Railroad (G&N), Charleston and Western Carolina (C&WC) and Ware Shoals Railroad.

Though owned by Duke Power, the P&N operated coal trains over a branch from Mount Holly, NC, to Terrell, NC, supplying Duke Power's Lake Norman powerplants.

North Carolina Division
Mile	Station	Interchange	Notes
0.0	Charlotte	Southern, NS	Piggyback ramps
3.8	Chemway		
4.1	Pinoca	SAL	Shops (still in use by CSX)
5.4	Toddville		
6.9	Thrift		
10.6	Sodyeco		
11.1	Mount Holly		
--	--	--	--
0.0	Mount Holly		
	Riverbend		
	Cowans Ford		
	Denrock		
	Denver		
	Terrell		
--	--	--	--
13.5	North Belmont		
--	--	--	--
0.0	North Belmont		
3.1	Belmont	Southern	
--	--	--	--
16.5	McAdenville Junction		
17.6	McAdenville		
17.9	Lowell		
19.7	Ranlo		
21.7	Groves		
23.4	Gastonia	Southern, C&NW	Piggyback ramp

South Carolina Division
Mile	Station	Interchange	Notes
0.0	Spartanburg	ACL, Southern, Clinchfield, C&WC	Piggyback ramp
3.9	Saxon (Camp Wadsworth?)		
6.6	Clevedale		
10.2	Startex	Southern	
12.0	Lyman	Southern	
13.4	Duncan		
18.3	Greer	Southern	
	Chick Springs		
23.1	Taylors	Southern	
27.1	Paris (Hampton Heights?)		
33.5	Greenville (River Junction)	ACL, G&N, Southern, C&WC	Piggyback ramp
36.5	White Horse		
	Golden Grove		
43.7	Piedmont	Southern	
48.4	Pelzer	Southern	
50.5	Williamston	Southern	
	Thomason/Cheddar		
58.0	Belton	Southern, C&NW	
--	--	--	--
0.0	Belton	Southern, C&NW	
	Campbell		
	Toxaway		
11.6	Anderson	C&NW, ACL, C&WC	
--	--	--	--
65.8	Honea Path	Southern	
71.4	Donalds		
74.3	Shoals Junction	Southern, Ware Shoals RR	
80.2	Hodges		
83.9	Downs	Southern	
	Harris		
88.9	Greenwood	ACL, G&F, SAL, Southern, C&WC	Piggyback ramp

=== Extension ===
Plans to connect the North and South Carolina divisions between Spartanburg, SC and Gastonia, NC, and to expand northwards towards Winston-Salem, NC, were successfully blocked by appeals by the Southern Railway and other entities in court cases in the 1930s, specifically PIEDMONT & N. RY. CO. v. UNITED STATES, 280 U.S. 469 (1930) and PIEDMONT & N R. CO. v. INTERSTATE COMMERCE COMMISSION, 286 U.S. 299 (1932).

== Traffic ==
The P&N, though involved in extensive passenger operations, was primarily a heavy freight carrier. The most important commodity transported was coal and coke, but also of significance were cotton (including cotton waste) and paper.

Statement of Car Loads of Freight Handled (in Carloads) - Years 1955 and 1954
Commodity	Carloads, 1954	Carloads, 1955	Change
Grain and Grain Products	3221	3258	+37
Packing House; Products	2200	2381	+181
Fruits and Vegetables	1874	1838	-36
Coal and Coke	30203	37995	+7792
Building; Materials	4465	4966	+501
Cotton and Wastes	8093	8907	+814
Textile; Products	2746	2842	+96
Sand and Stone	2196	2521	+325
Automobiles	1889	2061	+172
Oil and Gasoline	2920	2738	-182
Fertilizer and Fertilizer Products	4056	3176	-880
Machinery	613	732	+119
Paper and Paper Products	6480	6786	+306
Clay and Fullers Earth	1897	1805	-92
Iron and Steel Articles	2746	3297	+37
Forest; Products	2257	2054	-203
Merchandise	4767	4350	-417
Miscellaneous	17128	17986	+858

(Data from P&N 1955 Annual Report)

== Remnants ==
=== Remaining structures ===
Only four of the stations built for the P&N, designed by Charles Christian Hook are still in existence today in North Carolina.

The Thrift depot in the Paw Creek community in Charlotte, NC is the only remaining P&N station in Mecklenburg County, NC; it is presently for sale."

In Gaston County, several structures are still standing. The depot in Mount Holly, North Carolina is still standing and is used as a hair salon. The former P&N depot in Belmont, NC has been restored and was a P&N museum until 2004, when the lease ran out and was not given extension by the owner. The former P&N station in Gastonia, NC, burned down in 1995. Lastly, the small depot of McAdenville, NC is still standing, though it has been relocated from its previous location.

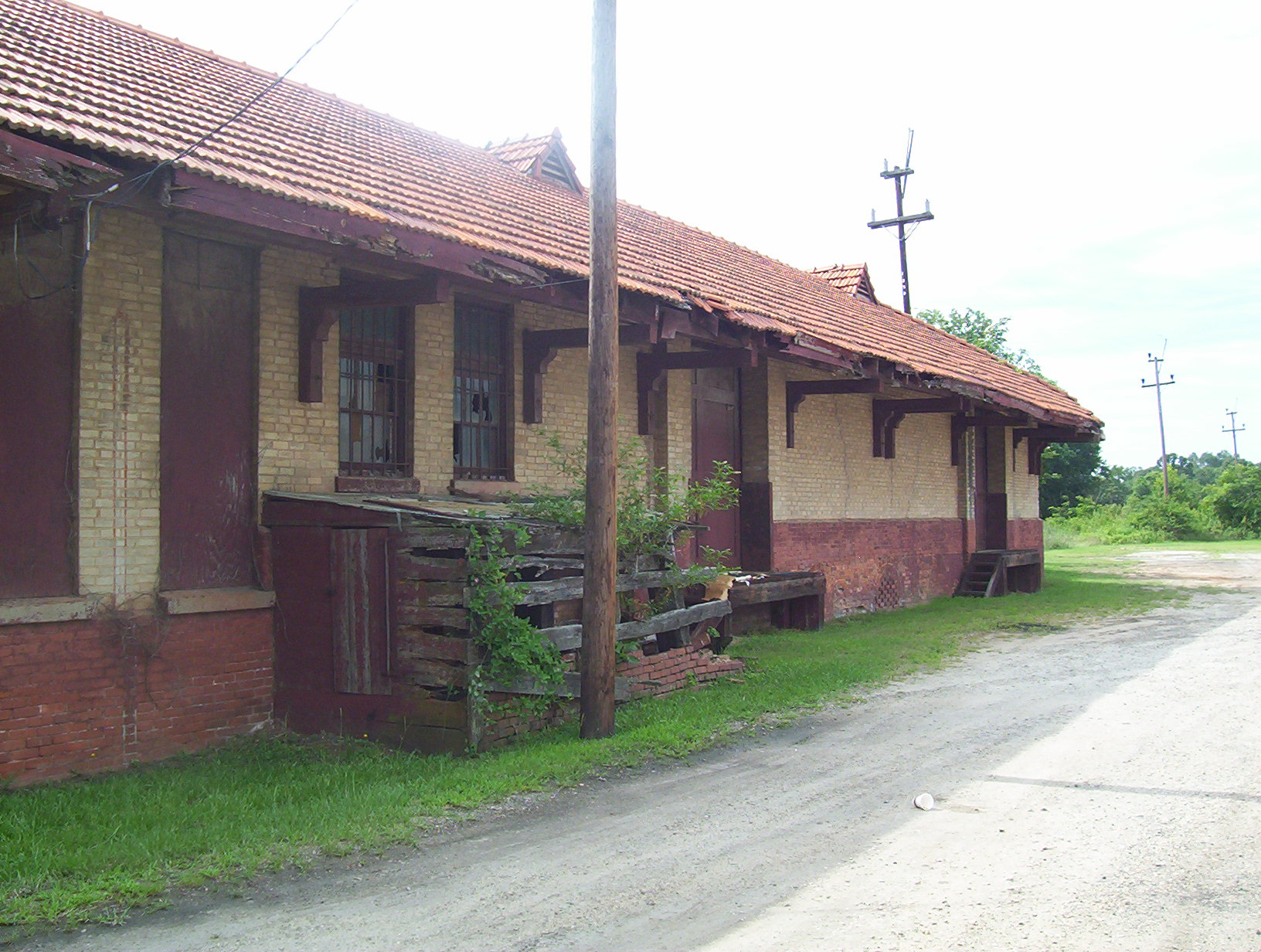
Former P&N depot, Piedmont, SC

In South Carolina, at least four stations are still standing: Donalds, Hodges, Greer, and Anderson. The abandoned depot at Pelzer burned on the night on January 26, 2011, and shortly afterward it and the nearby Piedmont station were demolished by the CSX which had refused to support a local effort to save the Pelzer station.

Nothing remains of the P&N in Honea Path, SC, apart from power poles still standing, delineating the former right-of-way.

The station at Taylors, SC was still standing in 1987. Though it is now gone, a former substation - including some overhead poles of the P&N line - can still be found near the CSX's Enoree River viaduct.

The former P&N RR Charlotte terminal freight depot was in the Mint/Graham/Second(MLK)St /Third St block, while the Charlotte terminal passenger depot was in the Mint/Graham/Third St/Fourth St block in Charlotte. BB&T Ballpark now sits on the former depot site.

=== Existing lines, current operations ===
Some of the P&N's former lines are still in existence, with limited amounts still in operation. The track from Pelzer, SC to Spartanburg, SC is the CSX's Belton Subdivision. The segment from Pelzer to Belton was taken over by the Greenville and Western Railway in 2006. In Gaston County, the track from Mt. Holly, NC to Gastonia, NC and from Mount Holly to Belmont, NC is still in place. Initially the track belonged to CSX; it is now owned by the North Carolina Department of Transportation, which awarded a contract in May 2010 to Patriot Rail Corporation to restore the track and operate trains along the 12 miles (19 km) line. Since May 2022, this segment is operated by Charlotte Western Railroad.
