= Eddy Lake and Northern Railroad =

The Eddy Lake and Northern Railroad was a railroad in South Carolina that operated in the early part of the 20th century.

== History ==
The Eddy Lake and Northern Railroad was chartered by the South Carolina General Assembly in 1905.

The railroad was built by the Eddy Lake Cypress Company into Gunters Island, to harvest lumber.

The line was to be 35 miles in length, stretching from Eddy Lake in Horry County to Marion, South Carolina.

According to the Railway Age Gazette, by 1907 the company had completed 15 miles of track from Eddy Lake to Browns Swamp, South Carolina, and had awarded contracts to build another 20 miles on to Marion.

In 1915, the company filed for a 10-year extension so as to have time to complete the line.

It is unclear if the line to Marion was ever completed or when the line was abandoned.
