= Buffalo Union-Carolina Railroad =

The Buffalo Union-Carolina Railroad was a South Carolina railroad that operated during the middle of the 20th century.

The Buffalo Union-Carolina Railroad was a successor to the Union and Glenn Springs Railroad, which was chartered in 1899 and extended from Pride, South Carolina, to Buffalo, South Carolina, a little more than 19 miles. The line went into receivership in 1905.

The Buffalo Union-Carolina began operations along the Union and Glenn Springs line in 1922.

The Buffalo Union-Carolina was acquired by Southern Railway in the 1950s and abandoned in 1971.
