= Carolina Western Railroad =

The Carolina Western Railroad was a shortline railroad that served the South Carolina Lowcountry in the first half of the 20th century.

A freight-only carrier, the Carolina Western ran from St. Stephens, South Carolina, to Halls, South Carolina. The line was just six miles in length.

According to the South Carolina Railroads website, the line was destroyed when Lake Moultrie was constructed in late 1930s.
