= Rockton and Rion Railway =

Defunct railroad in South Carolina, USA

The Rockton and Rion Railway was a Class III railroad operating freight service in Fairfield County, South Carolina until its abandonment in 1981. The railroad's entire 12-mile right-of-way is now owned by the South Carolina Railroad Museum, which rebuilt some of the railroad and currently operates on 5 miles of the line.

== History ==
The Rockton and Rion operated from a connection with the Southern Railway at Rockton, South Carolina to Anderson Quarry, South Carolina. The railroad's freight consisted of sand and gravel moving outbound.

Operations ceased on August 21, 1981.

After abandonment was approved, the railroad's owner, Martin Marietta Materials, in October 1983 donated the entire Rockton and Rion right-of-way to the South Carolina Railroad Museum. The museum then began the process of rebuilding the line, which it renamed the Rockton, Rion and Western Railroad.

== See also ==
- South Carolina Railroad Museum
