= North Charleston Terminal Company =

Railroad company in South Carolina, United States

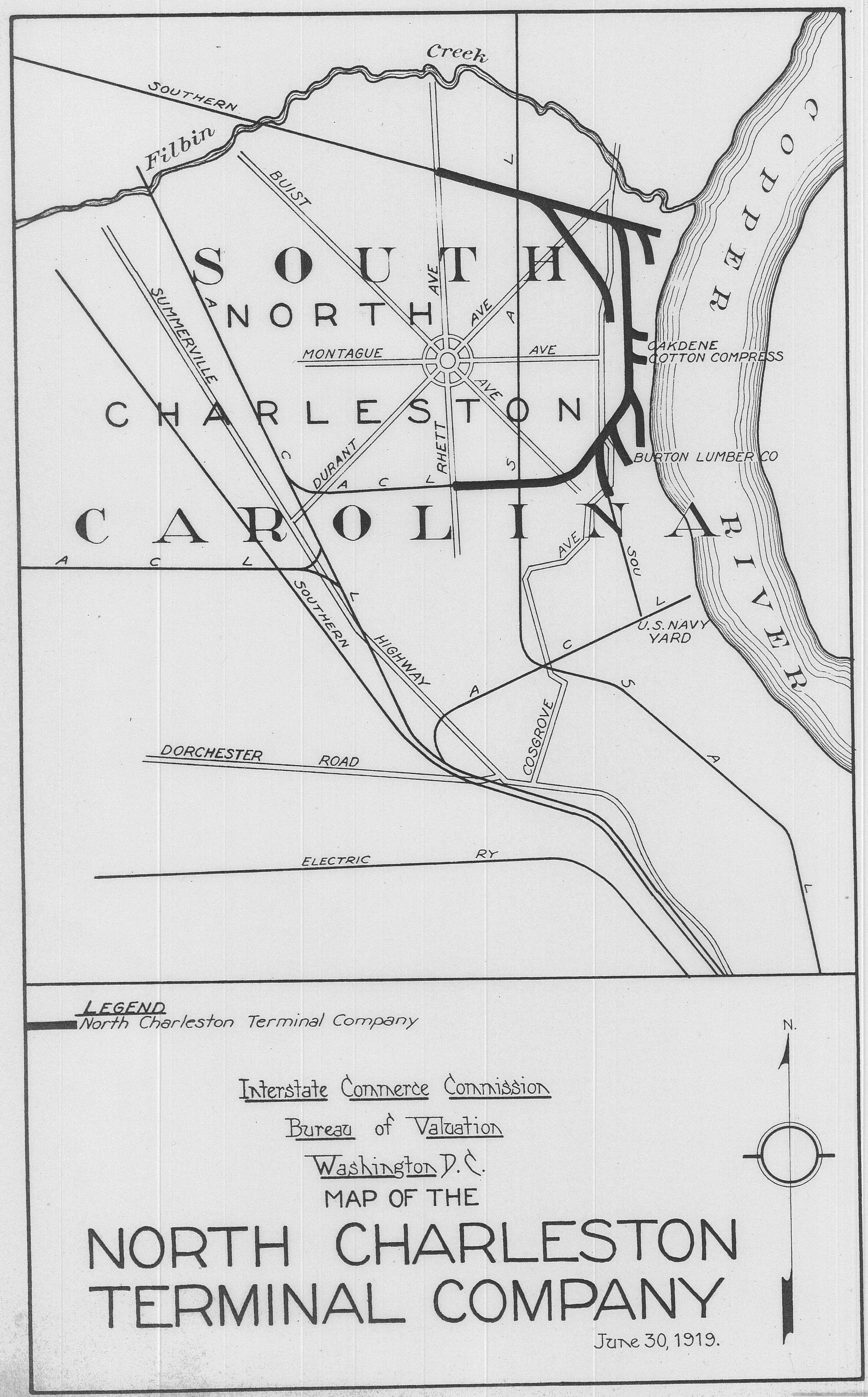
1919 map of the railroad

The North Charleston Terminal Company was a railroad company that provided switching facilities between the various industries of the manufacturing district and the connecting railroads at North Charleston, South Carolina.

The carrier was chartered by the South Carolina General Assembly in February 1916 to build and operate terminal facilities at North Charleston.

The North Charleston Terminal Company owned a little more than two miles of main track and nearly six miles of yard track and sidings. It built some of the line itself and purchased some from the Southern Railway and the Atlantic Coast Line Railroad.

Today, the North Charleston Terminal Company is owned through a partnership with CSX controlling a two-thirds share of the entity and Norfolk Southern a one-third share.
