= Greenville and Port Royal Railroad =

Former railroad in South Carolina, USA

The Greenville and Port Royal Railroad was a railroad chartered by the South Carolina General Assembly in 1882.

In 1885, the Greenville and Port Royal's charter was amended by the S.C. General Assembly and the line was renamed the Atlantic, Greenville and Western Railway.

The Atlantic, Greenville and Western was consolidated with the Carolina, Knoxville and Western Railway and the Pennsylvania and Haywood Railroad, under the Carolina, Knoxville and Western Railway moniker in 1887.
