= Columbia Union Station Company =

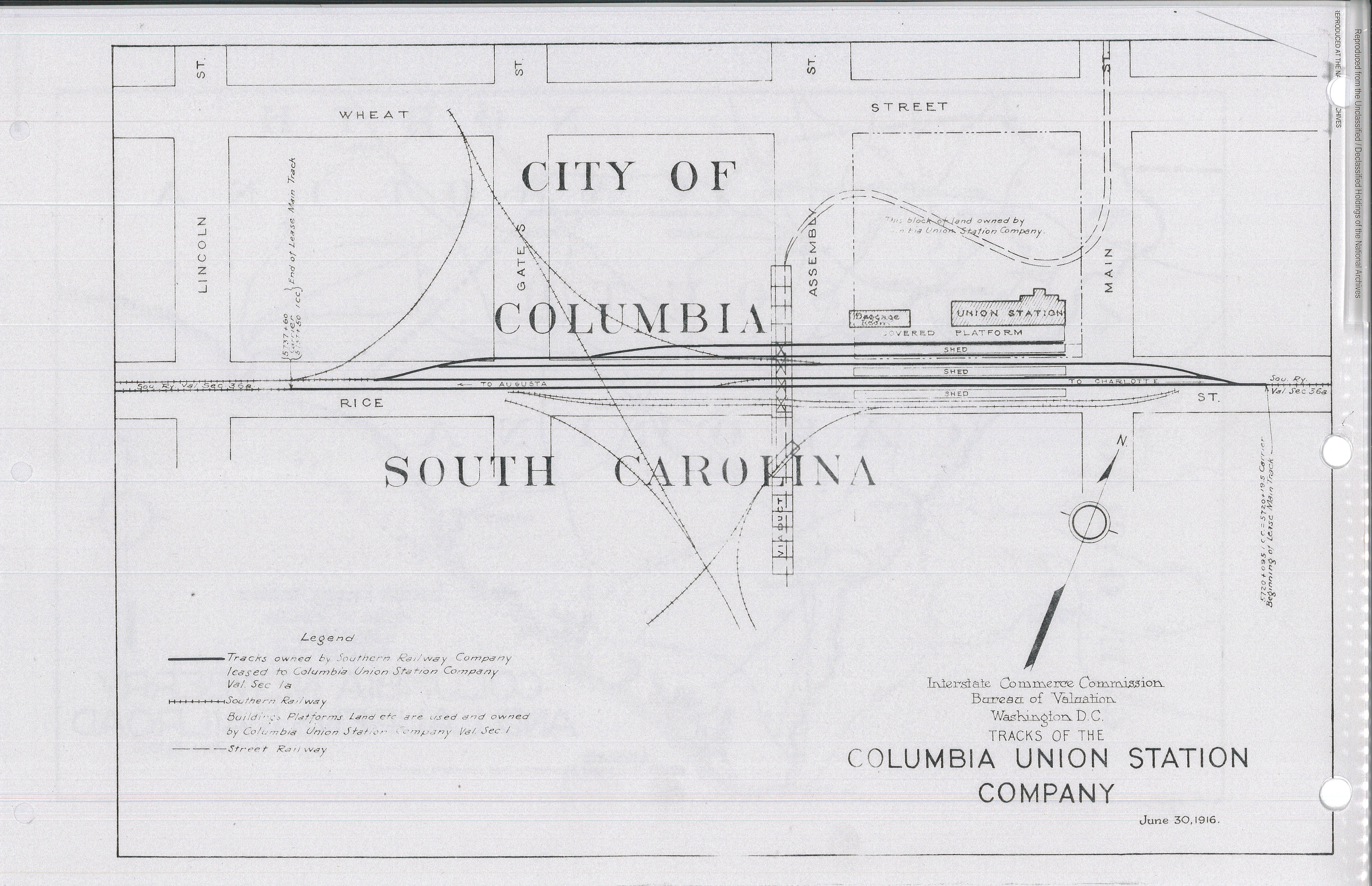
1916 map of the railroad

The Columbia Union Station Company was a railroad company based in Columbia, South Carolina, that operated throughout much of the 20th century.

The Columbia Union Station Company was chartered by the South Carolina General Assembly in 1900 to acquire, construct, maintain and operate or lease to others companies railroad terminal facilities for rail passenger accommodation, mail transfer and maintenance of restaurants, news stands, and telegraph and telephone offices.

The carrier was controlled by the Southern Railway and the Atlantic Coast Line Railroad.

The Columbia Union Station Company owned no track, but leased one-third of a mile of track from Southern and nearly a mile of yard tracks and sidings, all in Columbia.

The company went out of business in the early 1970s, but the structure at 401 South Main Street was later renovated and is now a popular Columbia restaurant.
