= Marion and Southern Railroad =

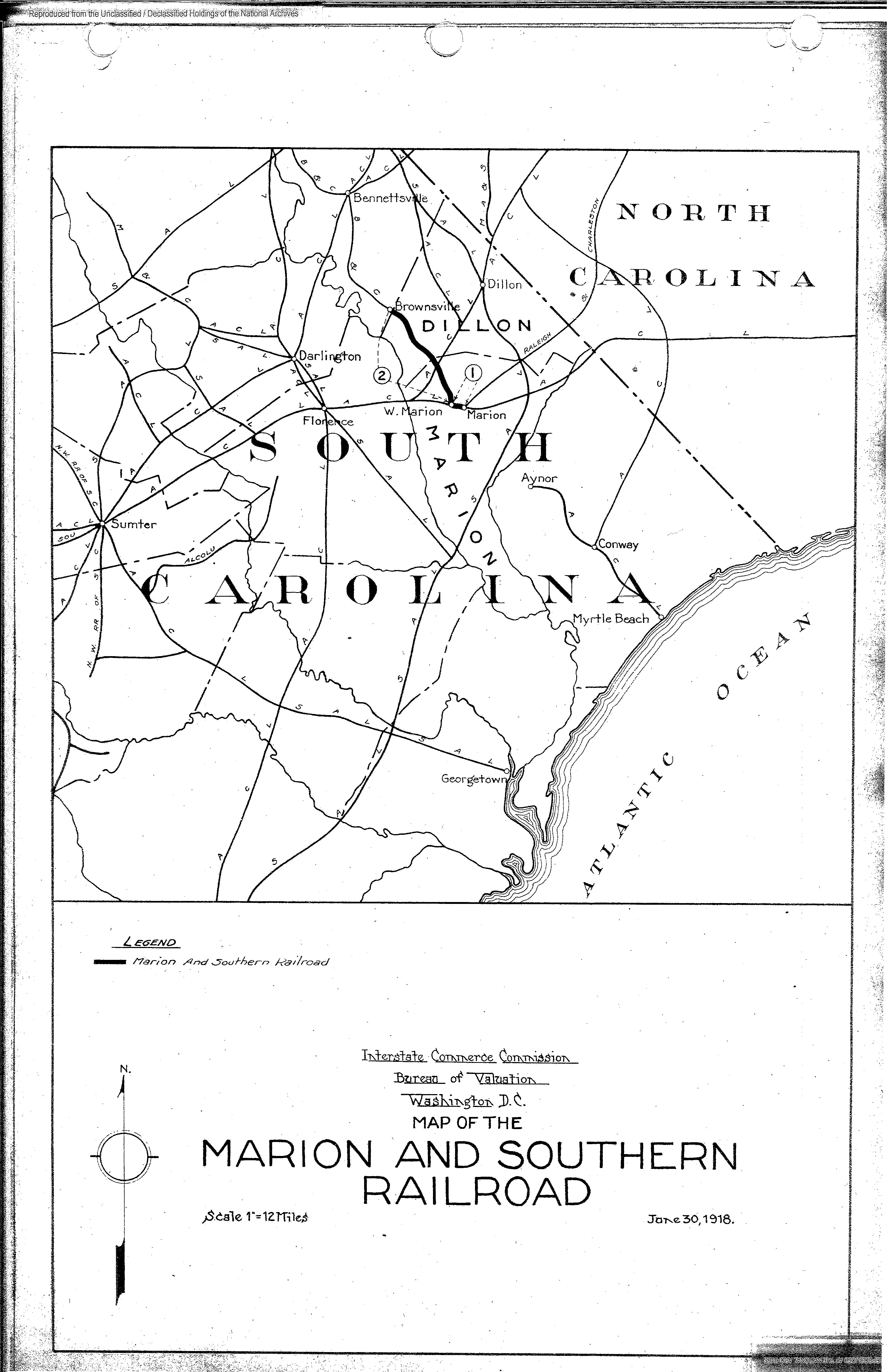
1918 map of the railroad

The Marion and Southern Railroad was a South Carolina railroad that operated during the first half of the 20th century.

The Marion and Southern was incorporated in South Carolina in 1907.

The carrier's main line extended from Marion, South Carolina, to Brownsville, South Carolina, about 20 miles. Of the total mileage, only the 1.6-mile section between Marion and West Marion, South Carolina, was used by the carrier. The remainder was leased to and operated by the Marion County Lumber Company.

The Raleigh and Charleston Railroad acquired control of the line in 1912. By the time the line was abandoned in 1937, only a two-mile segment from West marion to Marion was still in service.
