= Spartanburg, Union and Columbia Railroad =

The Spartanburg, Union and Columbia Railroad was a successor railroad to the Spartanburg and Union Railroad.

Like the Spartanburg and Union, the line ran from Alston, South Carolina, to Spartanburg, South Carolina. It was sold under foreclosure in June 1880 and leased to the Columbia and Greenville Railroad for 90 years. It was likely at this point that it changed its name to the Spartanburg, Union and Columbia.

The carrier operated as part of the Richmond and Danville Railroad system from 1881 to 1894 and was controlled by the Southern Railway Company after 1895.
