= Pickens Railroad =

Shortline railroad in South Carolina

The Pickens Railroad is a shortline railroad that operates in the South Carolina Upstate region for more than a century, beginning in the 1890s.

The company was chartered in 1890 to build a 19-mile line from Easley, South Carolina, to Olenoy Gap by way of Pickens, South Carolina.

The line was opened between Easley and Pickens in 1898.

The train became known as the Doodle train because there was no way to turn the engine between runs on the eight-mile route and it returned to Pickens backward, looking like a doodle bug.

The Southern Railway briefly acquired control of the Pickens around 1910, however, it reverted to local interests several years later.

In the 1920s, Singer Manufacturing Company located a sewing machine cabinet plant on the Pickens Railroad. The plant eventually became the railroad's biggest customer and the line was purchased outright in 1939 by Singer.

In 1959, The Singer Company consolidated its sawmill and cabinet operations with the woodworking operations from Arkansas and the Craftsman power tools from New Jersey to the Pickens location. In 1963 Poinsett Lumber and Manufacturing Company had announced that the Pickens Railroad was for sale and James F. Jones of North Carolina purchased the line for approximately $50,000.

Jones built a new enginehouse and established a carshop for rebuilding and renovating railroad cars. Jones sold the Pickens in 1973 to Philadelphia-based National Railway Utilization Company, which expanded the carshop to build new freight cars.

In the early 1990s NRUC became Emergent Group and sold the railroad to CLC-Chattahoochee Locomotive Corp., which renamed the railroad Pickens Railway Company, according to the Federal Register.
