= Union and Glenn Springs Railroad =

Former South Carolina railroad

The Union and Glenn Springs Railroad was a South Carolina railroad that served the Upstate region of the state in the early part of the 20th century.

The Union and Glenn Springs Railroad was chartered by the South Carolina General Assembly in 1899. The charter called for the line to run from Union, South Carolina, to Glenn Springs, South Carolina, a popular tourist destination.

The line was built by Thomas Duncan a businessman who went on to serve as mayor of Union and in both the South Carolinian House of Representatives and Senate.

The line extended from Pride, South Carolina, to Buffalo, South Carolina, a little more than 19 miles. One of the main industries served was the Union-Buffalo Mills Company, which was also owned by Duncan.

In 1905 the line was placed in receivership, with Columbia, South Carolina, businessman Edwin Robertson serving as receiver.

The line was renamed the Buffalo Union-Carolina Railroad in 1922.

The Buffalo Union-Carolina was acquired by Southern Railway in the 1950s and abandoned in 1971.
