= Atlantic, Greenville and Western Railway =

Former railroad company

The Atlantic, Greenville and Western Railway was a railroad company chartered by the South Carolina General Assembly in 1885.

The Atlantic, Greenville and Western was the new name given in December 1885 when the Greenville and Port Royal Railroad had its charter amended by the S.C. General Assembly. The Greenville and Port Royal Railroad was chartered by the General Assembly in 1882.

The Atlantic, Greenville and Western was consolidated with the Carolina, Knoxville and Western Railway and the Pennsylvania and Haywood Railroad, under the Carolina, Knoxville and Western Railway moniker in 1887.
