= South Carolina Air–Line Railway =

The South Carolina Air–Line Railway was a railroad company formed in March 1877 and merged a month later with the Georgia Air Line Railway and the North Carolina Air Line Railway to form the Atlanta and Charlotte Air Line Railway.
