= Ware Shoals Railroad =

Overview
- Headquarters: Ware Shoals, South Carolina
- Reporting mark: WS
- Locale: Upstate South Carolina
- Dates of operation: 1905–1985

Technical
- Track gauge: 4 ft 8 1/2 in (1,435 mm) standard gauge

The Ware Shoals Railroad (reporting mark WS) was a shortline connecting the town of Ware Shoals, South Carolina, to the Southern Railway and Piedmont and Northern Railway (later Seaboard Coast Line) at Shoals Junction, South Carolina, a distance of 5.2 miles (8.4 km).

== History ==
The train carried goods to and from the textile mill located in Ware Shoals, South Carolina, but its main use was the transportation of coal. The railroad was built in 1905 by the Southern Railway, which supplied locomotives to operate the line with during the steam era. By the late 1950s, the railroad dieselized with a single ex-Southern General Electric 44-ton locomotive, numbered 1955.

The railroad ceased operations in 1985 when the textile mill begin to curtail operations. Trackage was pulled up in 1987.

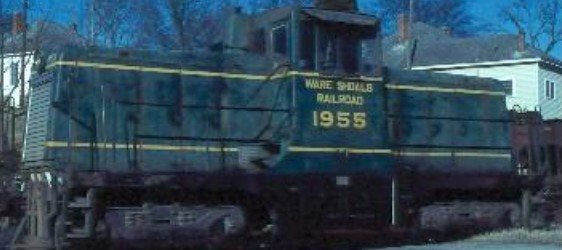
Ware Shoals Railroad engine, circa 1970s. Photo by Bill Shannon.
