= Berkeley Railroad =

The Berkeley Railroad was a South Carolina railroad that served the Charleston area beginning in the late 19th century.

The Berkeley Railroad was chartered by the South Carolina General Assembly in 1892.

The Berkeley Railroad ran from Chicora, South Carolina, to Moncks Corner, South Carolina, and connected with the Atlantic Coast Line Railroad at Moncks Corner.

The Berkeley Railroad was built by A.S. Emerson, an early real estate developer who wanted to promote a development he called "New England City", in Berkeley County. Emerson built a railroad from Moncks Corner to New England City, which later became known as Chicora.

New England City did not make it financially and was sold at auction in July 1906 to a local lumber company. It is likely the tracks and ties were then probably taken up.
