= Sumter and Wateree River Railroad =

Former shortline South Carolina railroad

- Industry: Railroad
- Founded: 1899
- Defunct: 1902
- Fate: Sold to Southern Railway's Carolina Division
- Headquarters: South Carolina

The Sumter and Wateree River Railroad was a shortline South Carolina railroad operated by the South Carolina and Georgia Railroad system, beginning in 1899.

The Sumter and Wateree River Railroad was a 16-mile route that stretched from Sumter, South Carolina, to Middleton, South Carolina.

The line was sold to Southern Railway's Carolina Division at the end of 1902.
