= Lockhart Railroad =

The Lockhart Railroad was a shortline railroad that operated in South Carolina in the early 20th century.

The Lockhart Railroad was chartered by the South Carolina General Assembly in October 1899 to operate a line from Lockhart Mills at Lockhart, South Carolina, to a connection with the Southern Railway (U.S.) at Lockhart Junction, South Carolina, approximately 14 miles away.

The line opened for operation in May 1900.

Lockhart Mills was shuttered in the 1980s, but the rail line had been abandoned before that. Officially, the Lockhart branch was abandoned by the Southern Railway in the early 1970s.
