= Alston, South Carolina =

Former settlement in South Carolina, United States

Coordinates: 34°14′37″N 81°19′00″W

Alston is an extinct town in Fairfield County, in the U.S. state of South Carolina. The GNIS classifies it as a populated place.

== History ==
The community has the name of Joseph Alston, 44th Governor of South Carolina. A post office called Alston was established in 1850, and remained in operation until 1928.

== See also ==
- Spartanburg, Union and Columbia Railroad
