= Marion County Railway =

The Marion County Railway was a shortline railroad that operated in eastern South Carolina in the mid-1980s.

The line, acquired from Seaboard Systems in July 1984, ran a little more than six miles from Mullins, South Carolina, to Marion, South Carolina.

It operated until February 1985 and while it had not been abandoned as of a decade later, most of the track had been taken up.
