= Edgemoor and Manetta Railway =

South Carolina shortline railroad

The Edgemoor and Manetta Railway was a South Carolina shortline railroad that served the Manetta Cotton Mill in Lando, South Carolina.

The Edgemoor and Manetta Railway began in 1903 and ran until 1976. The line extended from Edgemoor, South Carolina, to Lando, South Carolina, about two miles.

The Edgemoor and Manetta is believed to have been the last railroad in the United States to use a steam-powered locomotive in regular service.
