= Orangeburg Railway =

The Orangeburg Railroad was a shortline railroad that served central South Carolina in the early part of the 20th century.

The Orangeburg Railroad was built between 1911 and 1913. The line stretched 17.7 miles, between Orangeburg, South Carolina, and North, South Carolina. It opened in 1913 and provided Orangeburg with a line that connected to the Seaboard Air Line Railway at North. Plans to extend the line to Columbia, South Carolina; Charleston, South Carolina; and Augusta, Georgia, never materialized.

By 1920, the line was in bad physical condition and in debt, and it was placed in receivership. It discontinued operations in October 1920. A year later, the Interstate Commerce Commission approved a request that the line be abandoned.
