= Canadys, South Carolina =

Unincorporated community in South Carolina, US

- Unincorporated community
- Location within South Carolina Location within the United States
- Coordinates: 33°03′21″N 80°37′13″W
- Country: United States
- State: South Carolina
- County: Colleton
- Elevation: 82 ft (25 m)
- Time zone: UTC-5 (Eastern (EST))
  - Summer (DST): UTC-4 (EDT)
- ZIP code: 29433
- Area codes: 843, 854
- GNIS feature ID: 1251831

Canadys is an unincorporated community in Colleton County, South Carolina, United States. The community is located at the intersection of U.S. Route 15 (US 15) and South Carolina Highway 61 (SC 61), 10.7 miles (17.2 km) north-northeast of Walterboro. Canadys had a post office from April 16, 1926, until January 11, 1992; it still has its own ZIP code, 29433.

== Coal-fired power plant ==
A coal-fired power plant, the Canadys Station Power Plant, was located near Canadys and operated by the South Carolina Electric & Gas Company, but was retired in 2013.

== Railroad ==
The power plant was served by Hampton and Branchville Railroad. With the loss of coal traffic formerly shipped to the power plant, the railroad is now largely dormant.

== Notable people ==
- Gerald C. Smoak (1930–2018), politician
