= East Shore Terminal Company =

The East Shore Terminal Company was a railroad company that operated along the Charleston, South Carolina, waterfront in the late 19th century and early 20th century.

The East Shore Terminal Company was in the business of transporting freight between trains and piers, "general wharfage business", and the compressing and storing of cotton, according to Poor's Manual of the Railroads of the United States.

In 1890 the East Shore Terminal Company was formed by a syndicate of outside railroad investors. The company received a 30-year franchise from the city of Charleston to construct a waterfront railroad spur.

In January 1893, the company suffered $4,000 worth of losses when a fire raced through a Charleston wharf, destroying four train cars and track.

In January 1896, a receiver was appointed for the company.

As of 1898, the company owned three miles of track, along with 14 wharves, 30 warehouses, three cotton compresses and about 30 acres of property.

In July 1903, the tracks, wharves and warehouses of the East Shore Terminal Company were sold at foreclosure and a new company was created, the Charleston Terminal Company. It was co-owned by the Atlantic Coast Line Railroad and the Southern Railway.
