= Bamberg, Ehrhardt and Walterboro Railway =

The Bamberg, Ehrhardt and Walterboro Railroad (B. E. & W.) was a South Carolina short-line railroad that operated in central South Carolina in the early 20th century.

Chartered by the South Carolina legislature in 1906, and completed in 1914, it was built between Bamberg, South Carolina, and Ehrhardt, South Carolina. In 1915, the line, built largely with Bamberg capital, opened rail communication between the two Bamberg, SC county towns. It was never extended to Walterboro, South Carolina. Its business office was in the Hays building at the corner of Main and Church streets in Bamberg. The depot and loading platforms were where Rockland Bleach & Dye Works (formerly Bamberg Textile Mill) now has its factory on Calhoun Street (circa 2003). The tracks ran down Calhoun Street, forming a "Y" at the present Calhoun and Log Branch streets. A spur track also ran from the Southern Railway tracks to connect with the B. E. & W.

For about a year and a half after its construction, the line was leased to the Atlantic Coast Line Railroad (ACL) as part of their branch from Green Pond to Ehrhardt. After the ACL lease, it operated as the B. E. & W. It hauled as many as 15,000 bales of cotton in a season, and as many as 100 cars of watermelons in one day. Cotton, fertilizer, forest products and truck crops comprised the majority of the freight. Due to severe financial difficulties, on November 16, 1939, it entered receivership and ceased being a public carrier.
