= South Carolina Railroad =

American railroad company (1843–1894)

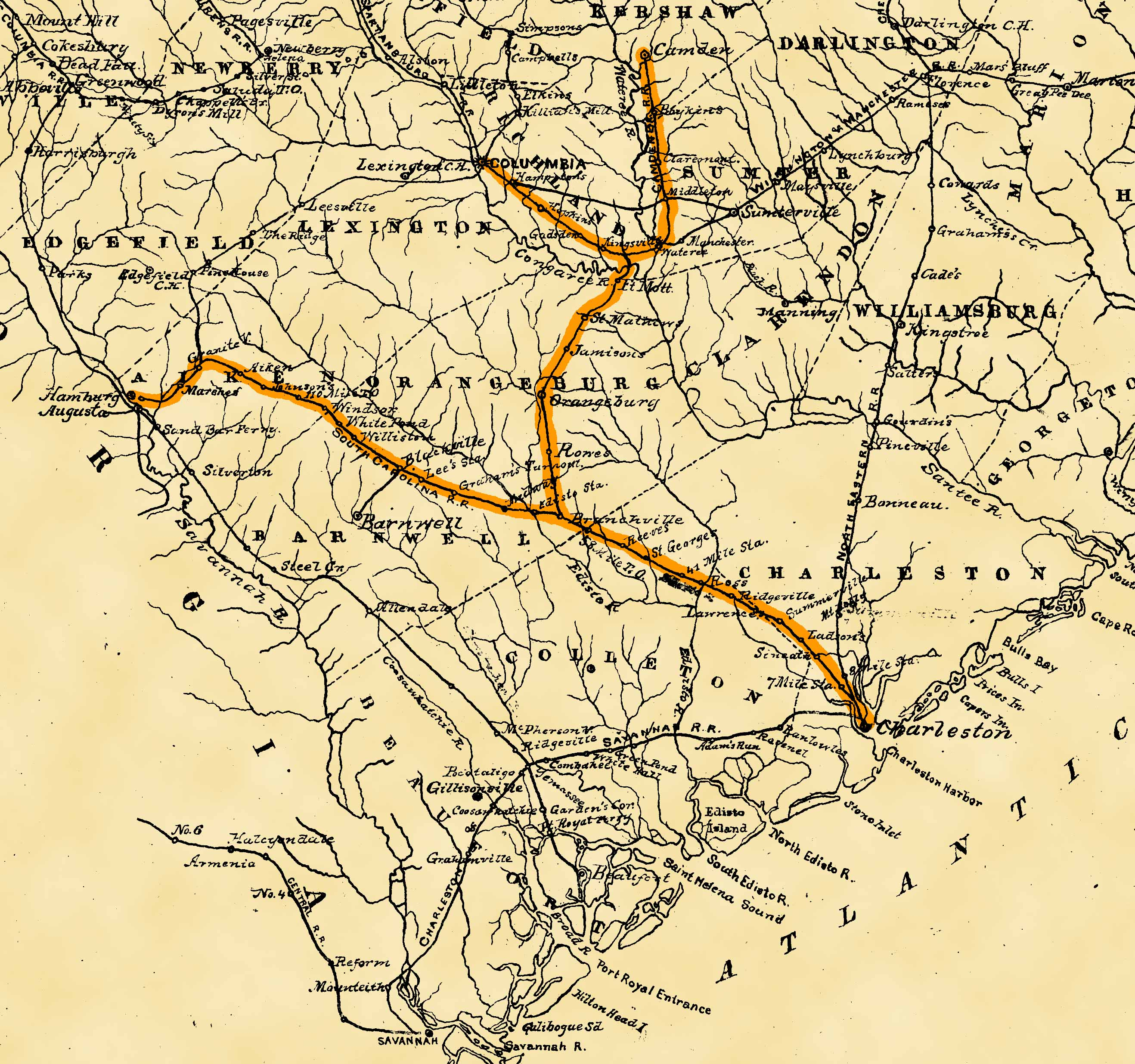

Overview
- Headquarters: Charleston, South Carolina
- Locale: South Carolina
- Dates of operation: 1843; 183 years ago – 1899; 127 years ago
- Predecessor: South Carolina Canal and Railroad Company; Louisville, Cincinnati and Charleston Railroad
- Successor: Southern Railway

Technical
- Track gauge: 4 ft 8 1/2 in (1,435 mm) standard gauge
- Previous gauge: 5 ft (1,524 mm) and 4 ft 9 in (1,448 mm)

The South Carolina Rail Road Company was a railroad company that operated in South Carolina from 1843 to 1894, when it was succeeded by the Southern Railway. It was formed in 1844 by the merger of the South Carolina Canal and Rail Road Company (SCC&RR) into the Louisville, Cincinnati and Charleston Railroad Company. It was built with a track gauge of 5 ft (1,524 mm).

The Southern Railway (now Norfolk Southern Railway) gained control of the line in 1899 and consolidated it into the Southern Railway – Carolina Division on July 1, 1902, under special act of South Carolina, approved February 19, 1902.

== History ==
=== Merger, rename and 1840s railroad construction ===
The South Carolina Canal and Rail Road Company was chartered under act of the South Carolina General Assembly of December 19, 1827. The company operated its first 6-mile (10 km) line west from Charleston in 1830.

The Louisville, Cincinnati and Charleston Railroad, which had built no track of its own, gained stock control of the South Carolina Canal and Rail Road Company in 1839. The merged companies changed its name to the South Carolina Rail Road Company under an act of the South Carolina General Assembly of December 19, 1843. The South Carolina Canal and Rail Road Company had built its first 6-mile (10 km) line west from Charleston in 1830. The railroad ran scheduled steam service over its 136-mile (219 km) line from Charleston to Hamburg, South Carolina, beginning in 1833.

In 1840, the company constructed a 66.3-mile (106.7 km) railroad line between Branchville and Columbia, South Carolina, and in 1848, the South Carolina Rail Road Company constructed a 37.1-mile (59.7 km) railroad line between Kingsville and Camden, South Carolina. In 1853, the company constructed a 1.8-mile (2.9 km) railroad, mainly a bridge over the Savannah River, from Hamburg, South Carolina, to Augusta, Georgia.

After 10 years of full operation, and the breakaway and reconsolidation of the LC&CRR, the South Carolina Railroad was still obliged by its original charter to connect with Camden. Despite hard economic times, and heavy debt inherited from the failed LC&CRR project, the 37.1-mile (59.7 km) branch between Kingsville and Camden was completed in 1848, fixing the route map for the next 50 years.

=== 1850s till 1880s ===
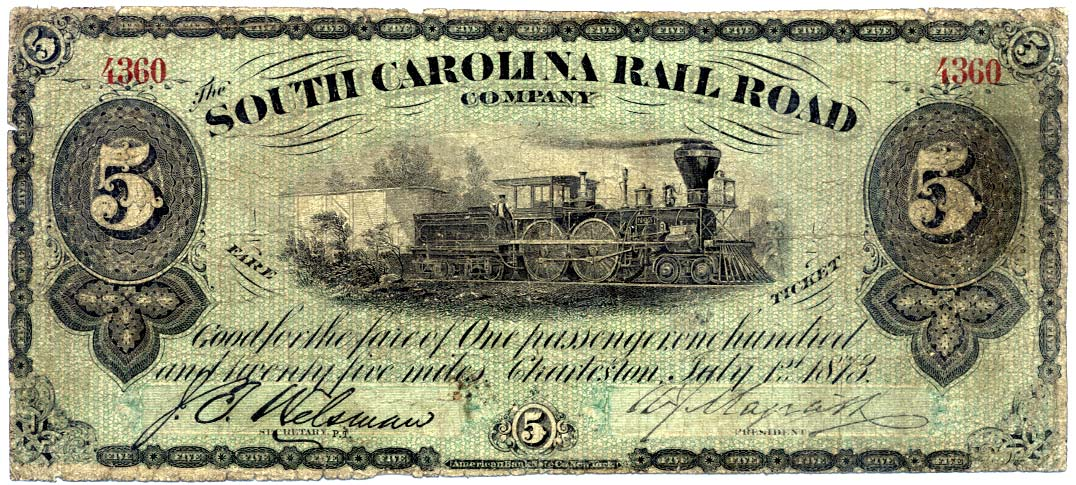
South Carolina Railroad "Fare Ticket"

During the great prosperity and statewide railroad expansion of the 1850s, the SCRR enjoyed a doubling of its receipts but was obliged to focus on paying off debt, upgrading its physical plant and resolving inefficiencies in its route. After the Civil War, financial losses due to operations of Federal military forces were estimated at $1,438,142. Losses due to the downfall of the Confederacy were $3,803,917, including defaulted CSA bonds, uncollected transport charges and 111 emancipated slaves.

Competition crept in thanks to previous failure to expand. In 1867 the SCRR fought an unsuccessful frog war during construction of the competing Charlotte, Columbia and Augusta Railroad by interfering in the courts, claiming an exclusive charter for any railroad connecting Charleston, Columbia, Camden or Augusta. A grade crossing in Columbia was protested in court, then blocked by a parked train, then torn up physically and finally threatened by a steamed-up locomotive ready to move forward to block at any moment. All of these obstructions were quickly dismissed or prohibited.

With debt over $6 million in 1873, the line was unable to expand beyond investments in some collateral lines, including the Greenville and Columbia Railroad. In a pinch, "fare tickets" were found to be helpful. Widely accepted as currency, each unit was good for a 25-mile passage along the line.

Despite these and all other efforts, the road went bankrupt in 1878 and was knocked down to New York interests for $1,275,000. On November 1, 1881, the South Carolina Rail Road Company was sold in foreclosure to the organizers of the South Carolina Railway Company, which was incorporated under the general laws of South Carolina on October 17, 1881, as amended December 24, 1885. After entering receivership in 1889 which lasted for five years under the aggressive management of Daniel H. Chamberlain, former Reconstruction governor of the state, the South Carolina Railway Company was reorganized as the South Carolina and Georgia Railroad Company, under the general laws of South Carolina, May 12, 1894, amended by act of December 24, 1894.

== Continuing improvements ==
The inclined plane at Aiken, South Carolina, was finally replaced by a modest rerouting and long cut in 1852. The terminus at Hamburg had never lived up to its promise, and the lack of an extension across the Savannah River to Augusta, Georgia, was an increasing embarrassment. After an attempt to gain control of the road bridge at Augusta, the SCRR finally overcame the resistance of local interests, built its own bridge in 1853 and made a direct connection with the Georgia Railroad in 1859. Local interests had also stopped the line at the city limits of Charleston, greatly hampering connection to seaport terminals, and were not overcome until 1885.

Piers of the 1853 Savannah River bridge at Augusta are still visible.

== Branches ==
Camden

In fulfillment of the original 1827 charter, a 38-mile (61 km) branch between Kingsville and Camden was completed in 1848.
