= Greenville and Western Railway =

Railway line based in Greenville, South Carolina

Overview
- Headquarters: Greer, South Carolina
- Reporting mark: GRLW
- Locale: Upstate South Carolina
- Dates of operation: 2006–present
- Predecessor: CSX Transportation

Technical
- Track gauge: 4 ft 8 1/2 in (1,435 mm) (standard gauge)
- Length: 12.74 miles (20.50 km)

The Greenville and Western Railway (reporting mark GRLW) is a Class III railroad that operates 12.74 miles (20.50 km) from a point south of Belton to Pelzer, South Carolina. Connections are made with Pickens Railway at Belton and CSX at Pelzer. The railroad is a subsidiary of Western Carolina Railway Service Corporation.

== History ==
The Greenville, Spartanburg and Anderson Railway was formed in 1910 to build an interurban railroad between its namesake cities. The Pelzer-Belton segment was built as part of its mainline from Greenwood to Greenville between 1910-1912. This line became part of the Piedmont and Northern Railway in 1914. In 1919, the Greenville and Western Railway attempted to stop service on the line and tear up the railroad. However, the Railway Commission of South Carolina opposed the change, as it would mean that passengers on the line would not have rail service and the company was ordered to not remove the railway. the Greenville and Western was ordered to The P&N was merged into the Seaboard Coast Line Railroad in 1969. Additional mergers occurred in 1983 with the Seaboard System merging with Chessie System, becoming CSX Transportation in 1986.

On April 26, 2006 CSX sought to abandon the line from Belton to Pelzer. The abandonment was rejected by the Surface Transportation Board in August 2006 as the line was still profitable. 87 carloads had originated from or terminated at two online industries in 2005 in addition to overhead traffic from 10 customers on the Pickens Railway. On October 20, 2006 CSX sold the line to the current operator.

Traffic surged to 1,872 carloads by 2009, primarily fueled by growth in ethanol traffic. Other commodities include scrap metal, limestone, fertilizer, feed products, plastics, and paper.

== Motive power ==
GRLW currently operates two EMD GP9 locomotives numbered 3751 and 3752. GRLW Also operates 4 EMD GP30u locomotives, 4201-4204.

Unit 3751 was formerly ECBR 6513 (2003–2007), formerly PTR 6513 (1987–2003) and originally B&O 6513 (1957–1987) - EMD frame no. 5519-3, serial no. 22987, built May 1957.

Unit 3752 was formerly ECBR 6554 (2004–2008), formerly PTR 6554 (1987–2004) and originally B&O 6554 (1957–1987) - EMD frame no. 5519-44, serial no. 23028, built July 1957.

4201, branded for Western Carolina Railway's subsidiary Aiken Railroad, was built in May 1963 as ATSF 1270 (EMD GP30). Rebuilt and renumbered several times by ATSF, then owned by BNSF when ATSF merged with Burlington Northern, it was purchased by WCRS and originally plated GRLW until it was repainted in WCRS colors and branded with AIKR.

4202, also branded for AIKR, was built in May of '63, as ATSF 1275. It also went through the same process, staying with ATSF/BNSF until sold to WCRS.

4203, built as ATSF 1209 (GP30), built in May 1962, stayed with ATSF/BNSF before being sold to LTEX, and bought by WCRS for GRLW.

4204, built as ATSF 1251 in March 1963, came down the same path as 4203.
