= Charlotte and South Carolina Railroad =

Railroad in North Carolina and South Carolina, US

Overview
- Dates of operation: 1852–1869
- Successor: Charlotte, Columbia and Augusta Railroad

Technical
- Track gauge: 5 ft (1,524 mm)

The Charlotte and South Carolina Railroad began in 1852 and operated until 1869, when it was absorbed by Charlotte, Columbia and Augusta Railroad. The line ran between Charlotte, North Carolina, and Columbia, South Carolina. It was the first carrier to serve Mecklenburg County, North Carolina. The railroad was 110 miles (180 km) long and its track gauge was 5 ft (1,524 mm).

== Backers ==
Financed by Charlotte-area businessmen, the building of the Charlotte and South Carolina Railroad has been called the single most important event in Charlotte's economic history. Construction began on the line in 1847. According to a 2001 article in the Rock Hill Herald, "The driving forces were the White Family and Springs family, prominent planters who realized a need for a better way to move the area's commerce."

== Presence in Rock Hill, SC ==
In the late 1840s, the Charlotte and South Carolina Railroad wanted to expand and build a line that went from southern Charlotte to Columbia, SC. The railroad approached the settlers in the small village of Ebenezerville, but they rejected the opportunity to have a railroad station in their town. They believed it would be noisy and dirty, and did not want it to disrupt their lives. Engineers and surveyors approached the handful of residents a few miles away near a rocky hill landmark.

Those settlers, including the White family, the Black family, and the Moore family, were eager to have the railroad there. Those three families gave the railroad the right of way on their properties. The "rocky hill" landmark was the origin of the eventual city's name of Rock Hill.

Businesses were built in the immediate area of the depot, at first to serve the railroad construction workers, but later to serve everyone as the town grew. The first passenger train arrived on March 23, 1852. By the 1870s, Ebenezerville, the village that had rejected the depot, was a dying town, while Rock Hill was growing very quickly.

A fire in Rock Hill in 1884 destroyed the passenger depot, freight platforms, and storage areas. Two replacement depots were built, in order to separate the passenger and freight trains. A second railroad, the Charleston, Cincinnati, and Chicago Railroad came to Rock Hill in 1888, adding two of its own depots to the town. In 1896, the town convinced the two railroads to build one joint depot to increase efficiency and cut down on confusion.

Between 1909 and 1912, the railroad depot was upgraded to a two-story brick building. It is now owned by the Southern Railway System.

== American Civil War ==
The line served as a vital railroad connection during the American Civil War of 1861–1865, and was damaged in the waning days of the conflict by General William T. Sherman's troops as they ravaged South Carolina.

== Expansion of the railroad ==
The railroad was renamed in 1870 as the Charlotte, Columbia and Augusta Railroad once the track between Columbia and Augusta was finished. The railroad began using coal-burning engines by 1885. The line was absorbed by the Southern Railway in or before 1909.

== Industrial development ==
The line later played a critical part in the creation of Charlotte’s textile industry boom of the late 19th century and early 20th century. In addition, the cities of Rock Hill, South Carolina, Fort Mill, South Carolina, and Pineville, North Carolina, were founded as depots of the Charlotte and South Carolina Railroad in its early days.
