= Columbia and Greenville Railroad =

Railroad in South Carolina, US

Technical
- Track gauge: 4 ft 8 1/2 in (1,435 mm) standard gauge
- Previous gauge: 5 ft (1,524 mm) converted to 4 ft 9 in (1,448 mm) in 1886

The Columbia and Greenville Railroad was a South Carolina, US, railroad that operated in the late 19th century.

Originally chartered and begun as the Greenville and Columbia Railroad, the line was sold under foreclosure and reorganized under the Columbia and Greenville name in 1880.

Beginning in 1886, it was leased to the Richmond and Danville Railroad and in 1894 it was incorporated into the Southern Railway.
