= Charlotte, Columbia and Augusta Railroad =

American Southern railroad (1869–1878)

Overview
- Dates of operation: 1869–1878
- Successor: Richmond and Danville Railroad

Technical
- Track gauge: 4 ft 8 1/2 in (1,435 mm) standard gauge
- Previous gauge: previous gauges: 5 ft (1,524 mm) and 4 ft 9 in (1,448 mm)

The Charlotte, Columbia and Augusta Railroad was formed in 1869 with the merger of the Charlotte and South Carolina Railroad and the Columbia and Augusta Railroad.

== Route ==
The combined line stretched for over 190 miles (310 km) between Charlotte, North Carolina, and Augusta, Georgia.

Stations

- Charlotte, 0 miles
  - 0 kilometers
- Morrow's (Now Pineville), 11
  - 18
- Fort Mills, 18
  - 29
- Rock Hill, 26
  - 42
- Smith's, 35
  - 56
- Lewis, 38
  - 61
- Chester, 45
  - 72
- Cornwall's, 53
  - 85
- Black Stock, 57
  - 92
- Yonguesville, 60
  - 97
- White Oak, 64
  - 103
- Adger's, 67
  - 108
- Winnsboro, 72
  - 116
- Simpson's, 78
  - 126
- Ridgeway, 84
  - 135
- Doko, 91
  - 146
- Killian's, 97
  - 156
- Columbia, 107
  - 172
- Lexington, 124
  - 200
- Gilbert Hollow, 134
  - 216
- Leesville, 141
  - 227
- Batesville, 143
  - 230
- Ridge Spring, 153
  - 246
- Johnston, 162
  - 261
- Mile's Mill, 173
  - 278
- Graniteville, 183
  - 295
- Augusta, 195 miles
  - 314

== Track gauge ==
Originally, the line had a track gauge of 5 ft (1,524 mm), but that was changed to 4 ft 9 in (1,448 mm) in 1886.

== Ownership changes ==
The railroad was acquired by the Richmond and Danville Railroad in 1878 and officially merged into the Richmond & Danville in 1882. The latter went into receivership in 1892 and the Charlotte, Columbia and Augusta was foreclosed in the following year. It was sold to Southern Railway on July 10, 1894. After the acquisition in 1894, the Charlotte, Columbia and Augusta name was dropped and the Southern moniker was used.

== Tickets ==
The Charlotte, Columbia and Augusta Railroad printed fare tickets in $1, $2, $5 and $10 denominations that resembled US currency with the vignette of a steam locomotive on the front. The $1 fare ticket was good for one person for 20 miles. The $2 fare was good for two people 20 miles. The $5 fare was good for one person 100 miles and the $10 fare was good for two people 100 miles. Many businesses along the railroad would accept the railroad fare notes as currency for goods.
