= Carolina Midland Railway =

Railroad

The Carolina Midland Railway was a railroad that served western South Carolina in the late 19th century.

The Carolina Midland was formed in 1891 with the consolidation of the Barnwell Railway and the Blackville, Alston and Newberry's Perry-to-Blackville line.

In addition to a line reaching from Blackville to Barnwell, the Carolina Midland extended its route from Barnwell to Allendale, South Carolina, also in 1891.

It was acquired by the Southern Railway in 1899.
