= Hampton and Branchville Railroad =

Railroad in South Carolina

The Hampton and Branchville Railroad is a South Carolina railroad that has served the western part of the state since the 1920s.

The Hampton and Branchville Railroad is a successor of the Hampton and Branchville Railroad and Lumber Company, which was chartered by the South Carolina General Assembly in 1891.

The Hampton and Branchville Railroad and Lumber Company changed its name to the Hampton and Branchville Railroad in 1924. The H&B bought their first diesel locomotive in 1951 and retired their last steam locomotive in 1958. The Hampton and Branchville operates freight services from a CSX connection at Hampton to Canadys, South Carolina, about 40 miles (64 km) away. However, the railroad's main customer, the Canadys coal-fired power plant near Canadys operated by South Carolina Electric & Gas Company, received its last shipment of coal in December 2012 (the power plant was retired in 2013), and the railroad has been mostly dormant since.

The line is owned by Palmetto Railways
