= Greenville and Columbia Railroad =

19th century railroad in South Carolina

The Greenville and Columbia Railroad Company
- Greenville & Columbia Railroad

Overview
- Headquarters: Columbia, SC
- Locale: South Carolina
- Dates of operation: 1845–1880
- Successor: The Columbia and Greenville Railroad Company

Technical
- Track gauge: 5 ft (1,524 mm)
- Length: 229 mi (369 km)

The Greenville and Columbia Railroad was a 5 ft (1,524 mm) gauge railroad that served South Carolina in the 19th century.

== Beginnings ==
The line traces its history back to 1845, when Greenville, South Carolina-area leaders Benjamin Perry, Waddy Thompson Jr., John T. Coleman and Joel Poinsett called a public meeting, this one presided over by Vardry McBee. The goal was to create enthusiasm and collect subscriptions for a rail line to the northern and southern parts of the state. With a committee of 30 potential subscribers, they agreed to seek a preliminary charter for a Greenville and Columbia Railroad, with the understanding that they raise at least $300,000 in subscriptions within a year.

Greenville and Columbia Railroad Company stock certificate, 1875.

Unsuccessful, the group renewed their charter the following year. The plan was to build a 109-mile line up the east side of the Saluda River through Newberry, South Carolina, and Laurens, South Carolina, to Greenville. The 30 commissioners sought subscribers from Columbia, South Carolina, and all the surrounding counties. They were successful but when stockholders met in May 1847 in Columbia, those from the capital city and from the Abbeville and Anderson districts, urged by local property owner and famed politician John C. Calhoun, who wanted a different route, voted to build a 147-mile line on the west side of the river with its terminus in Anderson.

Greenville stockholders, and especially McBee, the largest single subscriber, cried foul. They wanted their money back, but the majority stockholders refused. So the Greenville contingent chartered the Greenville Railroad Co. and threatened to build a railroad from "Dr. Brown's place," near modern-day Belton, South Carolina, directly to Greenville, to shift freight and passengers away from Anderson.

McBee also put up $50,000 of his own money to make the subscription possible. The other stockholders reluctantly agreed. McBee's hand-picked candidate, John Belton O'Neall, was elected president of the line.

== Construction ==
McBee played an instrumental role in the development of the line. His son, Pinkney, a civil engineer, surveyed the line. His sawmill provided the timbers and he coaxed iron from distributors. He even quarried stone from his quarry for the foundation of the Greenville freight terminal.

By August 1852, the line had been completed to Greenwood. Despite a flash flood that washed out bridges, embankments and tracks along the Broad River, the line went forward. By late November 1853 the tracks were laid to within three miles of Greenville.

The coming of the Greenville and Columbia Railroad meant that a traveler could go from Greenville to Columbia in less than 11 hours and on to Charleston by the following day. It was a remarkable improvement considering the journey had previously taken two weeks.

== Civil War ==
The railroad was Greenville's lifeline to the rest of the state during the Civil War, but when Sherman's troops invaded Columbia, federal troops burned the carrier's offices and depot there. In addition, 12 miles of track ripped up, five bridges vanished and several locomotives were destroyed. After January 1865, it did not operate. A year later, another flood wiped out 40 more miles of track. The Greenville and Columbia Railroad did not restart operations until September 1866.

== Reconstruction ==
Almost immediately after the line began operations again, the federal government seized it without reimbursing stockholders. Henry Hammett, one of the few solvent Greenvillians after the war, became president in 1868, but then the Greenville and Columbia fell into the hands of the Railroad Ring, politically connected embezzlers who bilked the state out of its lien and mortgage on the rail line. While the carrier did manage to acquire the Union & Spartanburg Railroad around 1870, extending this line from Alston to Spartanburg, in 1872, the railroad declared bankruptcy.

At one point in the 1870s, a quarter of the state's revenues were lost in a single fiscal year after a failed investment in the troubled railroad. As a result of the failed investment, the state adopted a constitutional ban on investing public money in stocks, a ban that stood for more than 120 years.

== Reorganization and sale ==
The line was sold under foreclosure and reorganized under the Columbia and Greenville Railroad name in 1880.

Beginning in 1886, it was leased to the Richmond and Danville Railroad and in 1894 it was incorporated into the Southern Railway.
