= Charleston Terminal Company =

American transportation company

The Charleston Terminal Company was a transportation company that operated along the Charleston, South Carolina, waterfront in the early part of the 20th century.

The Charleston Terminal Company traced its history back to the East Shore Terminal Company, which was chartered in 1890.

The Charleston Terminal Company was created after the East Shore Terminal Company went into foreclosure in July 1903 and its tracks, wharves and waterfront buildings in Charleston were purchased. It was co-owned by the Atlantic Coast Line Railroad and the Southern Railway. The railroads held an agreement with the Charleston Terminal Company in which they would turn over traffic and pay for such services in order to provide the Charleston Terminal Company with an additional source of revenue to pay the interest on its bonds and not fall behind financially.

Within the next 18 months, the Charleston Terminal Company also acquired waterfront property and terminals that had belonged to the South Carolina Terminal Company.

By the early 1900s, the majority of viable dock properties in Charleston, including railway tracks, equipment and wharves, was run by the Charleston Terminal Company. However, more and more railroads were looking to Savannah, Georgia, for shipping and the Charleston waterfront fell into disrepair.

The condition of the Charleston wharves became a key issue in the Charleston mayoral race of 1919. Candidate John Grace argued that the franchise of the Charleston Terminal Company should not be renewed and the city should take over the administration of the waterfront. Incumbent Mayor Tristan T. Hyde argued that the franchise should be renewed, but under certain stipulations. Grace went on to win the general election.

After his inauguration, Grace immediately began transferring the responsibility of the port facilities to the city of Charleston. In March 1920, the South Carolina General Assembly passed an act "to authorize cities having a population of fifty thousand inhabitants or more to acquire, purchase, establish, improve, maintain, and operate the port utilities of such cities." A month later, the Charleston City Council denied the Charleston Terminal Company's formal request for a renewal of their franchise.

The city of Charleston proceeded to purchase the dock facilities from the Charleston Terminal Company for $1.5 million. In a special election on November 8, 1921, Charlestonians voted in favor of the issuance of $2.5 million in municipal bonds in order to pay for the purchase of the port properties.
