= Louisville, Cincinnati and Charleston Railroad =

The Louisville, Cincinnati and Charleston Railroad was an antebellum railroad that served the State of South Carolina and Augusta, Georgia. It was a 5 ft (1,524 mm) gauge railroad line.

== History ==
The Louisville, Cincinnati and Charleston was chartered in the States of South Carolina, North Carolina, Tennessee and Kentucky in 1835 and 1836 as The Cincinnati and Charleston Rail Road Company, to construct a railroad from an intersection with the South Carolina Canal and Railroad Company, which operated a railroad line between Charleston, South Carolina and Hamburg, South Carolina, to a point on the Ohio River near Cincinnati, Ohio. In 1836 and 1837, the name of the company was changed in the charter states to The Louisville, Cincinnati and Charleston Rail Road Company. Partly because the company was unable to obtain a charter through all states on the planned line the original plan was abandoned.

Former South Carolina Governor Robert Y. Hayne was named the first president of the Louisville, Cincinnati and Charleston, and other board members included John C. Calhoun and Robert Mills. In 1840, James Gadsden became president, a position he held for 10 years. Gadsden was a proponent of a Southern transcontinental railroad and was convinced it would be necessary to purchase a strip of territory along the Gila River from Mexico to make that project a reality. As Minister to Mexico, he negotiated the Gadsden Purchase, which enabled the United States to buy more than 45,000 square miles (120,000 km^{2}) of land from Mexico for $10 million.

In late 1839, after the company obtained financing in 1838, the company acquired control through a stock interest in the South Carolina Canal and Railroad Company of the 136-mile (219 km) railroad line between Charleston and Hamburg, South Carolina.

In 1840, the South Carolina company constructed a 66.3-mile (106.7 km) railroad line between Branchville, South Carolina and Columbia, South Carolina.

In 1844, the Louisville, Cincinnati and Charleston Railroad purchased the stock, road, and corporate privileges of the South Carolina Canal and Rail Road Company for $2.4 million. In 1844, the two companies were merged under an act of the South Carolina General Assembly of December 19, 1843 as the South Carolina Railroad Company.

In 1848, the South Carolina Rail Road Company constructed a 37.1-mile (59.7 km) railroad line between Kingsville, South Carolina and Camden, South Carolina. In 1853, the company constructed a 1.8-mile (2.9 km) line, mainly a bridge over the Savannah River, from Hamburg, South Carolina to Augusta, Georgia.

The South Carolina Rail Road Company, in turn, was sold at foreclosure on November 1, 1881 to the organizers of The South Carolina Railway Company, incorporated under the general laws of South Carolina, October 17, 1881, amended by act of December 24, 1885.
