= Manchester and Augusta Railroad =

Former US railroad

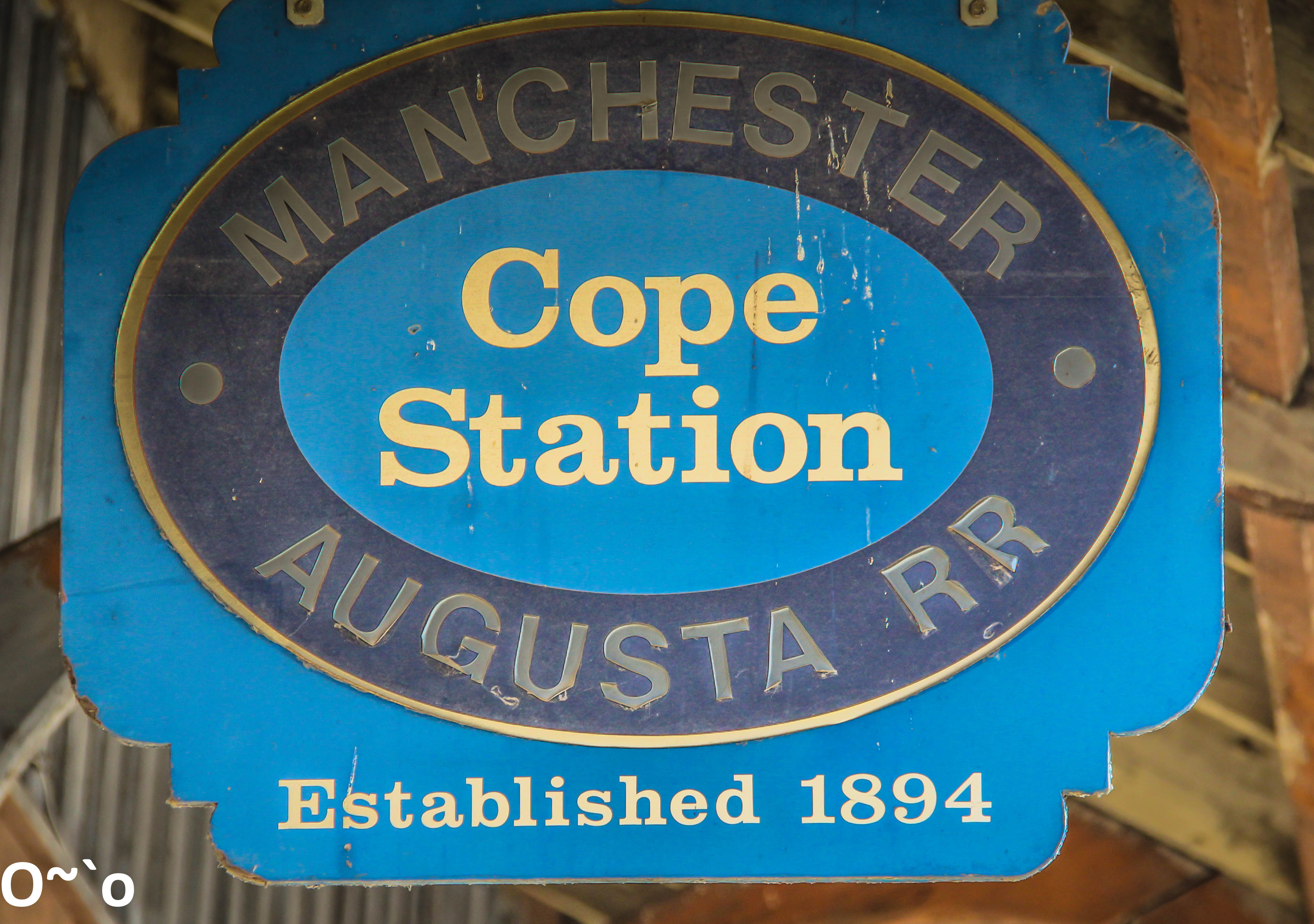
Logo for the Manchester and Augusta Railroad at the historic Cope ACL Depot in Cope, South Carolina.

The Manchester and Augusta Railroad (also M&A, M&A Railroad Co., Manchester & Augusta RR, and Manchester & Augusta Railroad Company) was a Southeastern railroad that operated following the American Civil War. The Manchester and Augusta Railroad was chartered in the 1870s, and built a line from Sumter, South Carolina, southwest to Denmark, South Carolina.

The Atlantic Coast Line Railroad was formed on July 16, 1898, by an Act of Assembly of South Carolina. It absorbed the Manchester and Augusta Railroad, as well as numerous other lines, on the same day. At the time of its acquisition by the Atlantic Coast Line Railroad the M&A had nine locomotives; six from the Baldwin Locomotive Works (No. 310, 311, 312, 313, 314, 320) and three from Rogers Locomotive and Machine Works (No. 317, 318, 319).

In 1967 the Atlantic Coast Line Railroad merged with the Seaboard Air Line Railroad to form the Seaboard Coast Line Railroad. By 1982 it was merged with Louisville and Nashville, Clinchfield, Georgia, and Atlanta and West Point Railroads to form Seaboard System Railroad and by 1987 was merged into CSX Transportation. At some point, the segment between Denmark and Cope was abandoned and the southern terminus became a South Carolina Electric & Gas Company power plant.

== See also ==
- Orangeburg Subdivision
