= Charleston, Sumter and Northern Railroad =

Historical US railroad

The Charleston, Sumter and Northern Railroad was a South Carolina railroad that operated at the end of the 19th century.

The line was originally chartered in 1885 by the South Carolina General Assembly as the Eutawville Railroad.

The name was changed to the Charleston, Sumter, and Northern Railroad in 1890 and the line from Bennettsville, South Carolina, to Charleston, South Carolina, was completed in 1891. That year the railway was connected to the Raleigh and Augusta Air Line Railroad at Gibson, North Carolina.

The line went into receivership in 1892.

The Atlantic Coast Line Railroad bought the Charleston, Sumter and Northern in October 1894, and the following year reorganized the line as the Charleston and Northern Railroad to prevent it from being used by a competitor. The line was absorbed into the Atlantic Coast Line Railroad, apparently in 1895. The track from the Santee River north to Sumter was sold to Tom Wilson's Northwestern Railroad of South Carolina.
