= Eutawville Railroad =

The Eutawville Railroad was a South Carolina railroad company chartered near the end of the 19th century. The line was chartered in 1885 by the South Carolina General Assembly. The line's name was changed to the Charleston, Sumter and Northern Railroad in 1890. The Atlantic Coast Line Railroad bought the Charleston, Sumter and Northern in October 1894.
