= Wilmington and Manchester Railroad =

Former railroad in the US states of North & South Carolina

- Original route (click to enlarge)

Overview
- Dates of operation: 1853–1870
- Successor: Wilmington and Carolina Railroad

Technical
- Track gauge: 5 ft (1,524 mm)

The Wilmington and Manchester Railroad was a railroad that served South Carolina and North Carolina before, during and after the American Civil War. It received its charter in 1846 and began operation in 1853 from Wilmington, North Carolina, extending west to the now-defunct town of Manchester, South Carolina (just west of Sumter). The track gauge was 5 ft (1,524 mm).

== Route ==
The 173 miles (278 km) route was built to haul South Carolina cotton to the Port of Wilmington, which was attempting to compete with the Port of Charleston. The railroad would go on to become a major shipper of naval stores and cotton.

== History ==
=== American Civil War ===
The line was devastated at the end of the war, when Union Gen. William T. Sherman dispatched some 2,500 federal troops from the South Carolina coast to locate locomotives and rolling stock that the Confederates were hiding in the state's hinterland. In April 1865, the force, under Gen. Edward E. Potter located nine locomotives and approximately 200 cars, many belonging to the Wilmington and Manchester, near Manchester, SC, and destroyed them.

=== Bankruptcy ===
Gen. William MacRae took over as superintendent in January 1866 and helped get the line back in operating order. That year, the Wilmington and Manchester Railroad created the Wilmington Railway Bridge Company as a joint venture with the Wilmington, Charlotte and Rutherford Railroad (later known as the Carolina Central Railroad) to build a bridge over the Cape Fear River. The bridge, which was jointly owned by both railroads, was completed in 1867 allowing both railroad to extend from a point near Navassa (on the west side of the Cape Fear River) to central Wilmington. The Wilmington and Manchester declared bankruptcy in 1870. The railroad was reorganized as the short-lived Wilmington and Carolina Railroad and again as the Wilmington, Columbia and Augusta Railroad.

=== Later years ===
The line was formally merged with the Atlantic Coast Line Railroad (ACL) in 1898. The line from Wilmington to Pee Dee became their Wilmington—Pee Dee Line, while the segment from Pee Dee to Florence was incorporated into the company's main line. Track from Florence to Sumter was incorporated into their Florence—Robbins Line.

The Atlantic Coast Line became the Seaboard Coast Line Railroad in 1967 after merging with their former rival, the Seaboard Air Line Railroad. In 1980, the Seaboard Coast Line's parent company merged with the Chessie System, creating the CSX Corporation. The CSX Corporation initially operated the Chessie and Seaboard Systems separately until 1986, when they were merged into CSX Transportation.

CSX still operates the former ACL main line segment (which is now the CSX's A Line). The line from Mullins to Whiteville is now operated by the R.J. Corman Railroad Group
