= List of Seaboard Air Line Railroad precursors =

Below is a list of railroads that were bought, leased, or in other ways had their track come under ownership or control by the Seaboard Air Line Railroad or one of its predecessors.

The Seaboard Air Line Railroad merged with the Atlantic Coast Line Railroad on July 1, 1967, to form the Seaboard Coast Line Railroad.

== Predecessor lines ==
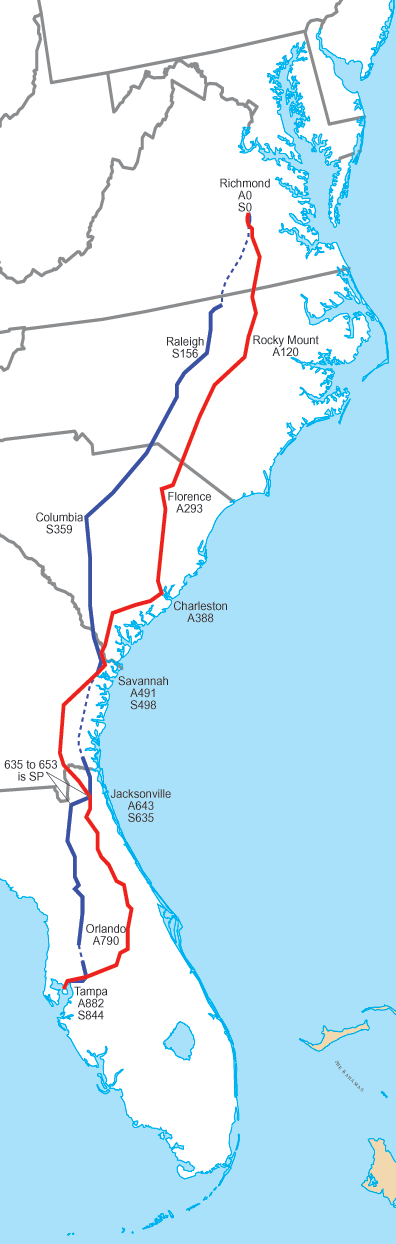
Map of CSX's "A" and "S" lines, inherited from predecessors ACL and SAL, respectively.

The Seaboard main line from Richmond to Tampa, heart of its 2600-mile system in 1900, (today mostly CSX's "S" Line), had been built by the following companies:

- Richmond, Petersburg and Carolina Railroad, Richmond, Virginia to Norlina, North Carolina (the immediate predecessor of the SAL)
- Raleigh and Gaston Railroad, Norlina to Raleigh, North Carolina
- Raleigh and Augusta Air-Line Railroad, Raleigh to Hamlet, North Carolina
- Palmetto Railroad, Hamlet to Cheraw, South Carolina
- Chesterfield and Kershaw Railroad, Cheraw to Camden, South Carolina
- Predecessors of the Florida Central and Peninsular Railroad:
  - South Bound Railroad, Camden to Savannah, Georgia
  - Florida Central and Peninsular Railroad Northern Division, Savannah to Georgia/Florida state line
  - Florida Northern Railroad, state line to Yulee, Florida
  - Fernandina and Jacksonville Railroad, Yulee to Jacksonville, Florida
  - Florida, Atlantic and Gulf Central Railroad, Jacksonville to Baldwin, Florida
  - Florida Railroad, Yulee to Baldwin to Waldo, Florida
  - Florida Transit and Peninsular Railroad Tampa Division, Waldo to Tampa, Florida

== Acquired lines ==
In the first decades of the 20th century, Seaboard expanded its holdings by acquiring the following lines, some of which were created by the Seaboard to construct new lines it wished to have.

Acquired by purchase:

- Florida Central and Peninsular Railroad, 1903
- Tallahassee, Perry and Southeastern Railway, 1909
- Atlanta and Birmingham Air Line Railway, 1909
- Atlantic, Suwannee River and Gulf Railway, 1909
- Florida West Shore Railway, 1909
- Plant City, Arcadia and Gulf Railroad, 1909
- Tampa Terminal Railroad, 1922
- Jacksonville, Gainesville and Gulf Railroad, 1927

Acquired by lease:

- Kissimmee River Railway, 1917
- Brooksville and Inverness Railway, 1925
- Tampa Northern Railroad, 1925
- Charlotte Harbor and Gulf Coast Railway, 1925
- Seaboard-All Florida Railway, 1925
- Naples, Seaboard and Gulf Railway, 1925
- Tampa and Gulf Coast Railroad, 1927
- Georgia, Florida and Alabama Railroad, 1928
- Northern Railway of Florida, 1928

== Seaboard Air Line Railway ==
=== Atlanta and Birmingham Air Line Railway ===
- Chattahoochee Terminal Railway
- East and West Railroad
  - Birmingham and Atlanta Air Line Railway
  - East and West Railroad of Alabama
    - Cherokee Iron Company
      - Cherokee Iron and Railroad Company
      - Cherokee Railroad
        - Cartersville and Van Wert Railroad
  - Tredegar Mineral Railway

=== Atlantic, Suwannee River and Gulf Railway ===
- Atlantic, Suwannee River and Gulf Railroad
- Starke and Sampson City Railroad

=== Carolina, Atlantic and Western Railway ===
- Charleston Southern Railway
- Georgetown and Western Railroad
  - Georgetown and Lane's Railroad
- Pee Dee Bridge Company
- North and South Carolina Railway
  - Charleston Northern Railway
  - North and South Carolina Railway
  - South Carolina Western Railway
  - South Carolina Western Extension Railway

=== Carolina Central Railroad ===
- Carolina Central Railway
  - Wilmington, Charlotte and Rutherford Railroad
    - Wilmington and Charlotte Railroad

=== Charlotte Harbor and Northern Railway ===
- Alafia, Manatee, and Gulf Coast Railroad

=== Columbus Railroad ===
- Brush Electric Light and Power Company

=== Florida Central and Peninsular Railroad ===
- East Florida and Atlantic Railroad
  - Orlando and Winter Park Railway
    - Orlando and Lake Jesup Railway
- Fernandina and Amelia Beach Railway
- Florida Railway and Navigation Company
  - Fernandina and Jacksonville Railroad
  - Florida Central and Western Railroad
    - Florida Central Railroad
      - Florida, Atlantic and Gulf Central Railroad
    - Jacksonville, Pensacola and Mobile Railroad
      - Pensacola and Georgia Railroad
      - Tallahassee Railroad
        - Florida, Atlantic and Gulf Central Railroad (operated)
  - Florida, Peninsula and Jacksonville Railroad
  - Florida Transit and Peninsular Railroad
    - Florida Transit Railroad
      - Atlantic, Gulf and West India Transit Company
        - Florida Railroad
    - Peninsular Railroad
    - Tropical Florida Railroad
  - Jacksonville and Mobile Railroad
  - Leesburg and Indian River Railroad
- Florida Northern Railroad
- Jacksonville Belt Railroad
- Santa Fe Canal Company
- Tavares, Orlando and Atlantic Railroad

=== Florida, Peninsular and Gulf Railroad ===
- Arcadia, Gulf Coast and Lakeland Railroad

=== Florida West Shore Railway ===
- United States & West Indies Railroad and Steamship Company

=== Gainesville Midland Railroad (bought by Seaboard in 1959) ===
- Gainesville, Jefferson and Southern Railroad
  - Walton Railroad
- Gainesville Midland Railway
  - Gainesville and North Western Railroad
  - Greene County Railroad
    - Bostwick Railroad

=== Georgia and Alabama Railway ===
- Abbeville and Waycross Railroad
- Albany and Florida Railroad
  - Albany, Florida and Northern Railroad
- Columbus and Southern Railroad
  - Columbus Southern Railway
    - Columbus and Florida Railway
- Georgia and Alabama Terminal Company
- Savannah, Americus and Montgomery Railway
  - Americus, Preston and Lumpkin Railroad
  - Montgomery & West Point Railroad

=== Georgia, Carolina and Northern Railway ===
- Chester, Greenwood and Abbeville Railroad

=== Georgia, Florida and Alabama Railroad (gained control in 1928) ===
- Carrabelle, Tallahassee and Georgia Railroad
- Georgia, Florida and Alabama Railway
  - Georgia Pine Railway

=== Oxford and Coast Line Railroad ===
Line from Dickerson to Oxford, NC

=== Palmetto Railway ===
- Palmetto Railroad

=== Plant City, Arcadia and Gulf Railway ===
- Warnell Lumber and Veneer Company
  - Plant City and Arcadia Railroad

=== Raleigh and Augusta Air Line Railroad ===
- Chatham Railroad
- Pittsboro Railroad

=== Raleigh and Charleston Railroad ===
- Carolina Northern Railroad

=== Raleigh and Gaston Railroad ===
- Louisburg Railroad

=== Richmond, Petersburg and Carolina Railroad ===
- Virginia and Carolina Railroad

=== Seaboard-All Florida Railway ===
- East and West Coast Railway
- Florida Western and Northern Railroad
- Naples, Seaboard, and Gulf Railway

=== Seaboard and Roanoke Railroad ===
- Roanoke Railroad
- Portsmouth and Roanoke Railroad

=== Tallahassee, Perry and Southeastern Railway ===
- Tallahassee Southeastern Railway
  - Florida, Georgia and Western Railway

=== Tavares and Gulf Railroad (bought 1926) ===
- Tavares, Apopka and Gulf Railroad

== See also ==
- List of Atlantic Coast Line Railroad precursors
