= Parkton—Sumter Line =

Railroad line in North Carolina and South Carolina

Overview
- Status: Some segments are still operating
- Owner: Atlantic Coast Line Railroad
- Locale: North Carolina; South Carolina

Technical
- Track gauge: 1,435 mm (4 ft 8 1/2 in) standard gauge
- Electrification: No
- Signalling: None

The Atlantic Coast Line Railroad's Parkton—Sumter Line (G Line) was one of the company's secondary main lines running between Parkton, North Carolina and Sumter, South Carolina.

== Route description ==
The Parkton—Sumter Line began at a junction with the Atlantic Coast Line's main line in Parkton, North Carolina. From Parkton, it ran northwest for a little over a mile to a point historically known as McNatt's. From there, it turned southwest and passed through Red Springs and Maxton before crossing into South Carolina near McColl. From McColl, it continued running southwest through Bennettsville, Mont Clare, and Darlington, where it connected with the Atlantic Coast Line's Wadesboro—Florence Line. Beyond Darlington, it continued to its terminus in Sumter, a hub and major junction for the Atlantic Coast Line.

A short branch line also ran from Bennettsville northeast to Gibson, North Carolina.

== History ==
The Parkton—Sumter Line from McNatt's (just west of Parkton) to Bennettsville, South Carolina was originally built in 1884 by Cape Fear and Yadkin Valley Railway (CF&YV) as part of their branch from Fayetteville to Bennettsville. From Bennettsville to Sumter, it was built by the Charleston, Sumter and Northern Railroad in 1891. The Charleston, Sumter and Northern Railroad also built track from Bennettsville northwest to Gibson, North Carolina that year.

Both the Charleston, Sumter and Northern Railroad and much of the Cape Fear and Yadkin Valley Railway became part of the Atlantic Coast Line Railroad by the end of the 1800s. After acquiring the lines, a connection to the company's main line in Parkton was quickly built by the Atlantic Coast Line. This allowed the Atlantic Coast Line to abandon the CF&YV's original route north of Parkton to Fayetteville as it closely paralleled the main line and was redundant.

Track from Bennettsville to Gibson would become a branch line of the Parkton—Sumter Line. The Gibson Branch was jointly operated with the Rockingham Railroad, which ran from Gibson to Roberdel, North Carolina and was acquired by the Atlantic Coast Line in 1922 and operated as a subsidiary.

The Atlantic Coast Line Railroad operated passenger service on the Parkton—Sumter Line in its early years but later became freight only. By 1949, a local freight train was running the line from Parkton to Darlington six days a week. A separate local freight train ran from Darlington to Sumter three days a week.

In 1950, the Atlantic Coast Line abandoned the southern portion of the Parkton—Sumter Line from Sumter to Darlington. The line from Marlboro (just south of Bennettsville) to Mont Clare was abandoned in 1953. The short stretch of track remaining from Darlington to Mont Clare remained as a spur of the Wadesboro—Florence Line. The remaining line from Parkton to Marlboro was then known as the Bennettsville Branch.

In 1967, the Atlantic Coast Line merged with its rival, the Seaboard Air Line Railroad (SAL). The merged company was named the Seaboard Coast Line Railroad (SCL). The Gibson Branch was abandoned north of Breeden in 1968 due to being redundant after the merger.

The portion of the route from Red Springs to McColl was removed in 1973 which split the remaining line into two discontinuous segments. The remaining line from Parkton to Red Springs was then known as the Red Springs Subdivision. Track from McColl to Marlboro became the Bennettsville Subdivision.

In 1980, the Seaboard Coast Line's parent company merged with the Chessie System, creating the CSX Corporation. The CSX Corporation initially operated the Chessie and Seaboard Systems separately until 1986, when they were merged into CSX Transportation.

== Current conditions ==
The Bennettsville Branch from Parkton to Red Springs was operated by the Red Springs & Northern Railroad from 1984 to 2001. In 2004, it was taken over by the Red Springs & Northern Railroad Foundation, who operates passenger excursions on open-air trailer cars pulled by railroad speeders.

A short segment near Maxton is used by CSX as a spur to the Wilmington Subdivision to access a Campbell's facility.

The line is still in service between McColl and Marlboro (just south of Bennettsville) and has been operated by the Pee Dee River Railway since 1987.

Further south on the abandoned segment, support pilings for the former bridge over the Pee Dee River are still standing just south of Marlboro.

== Historic stations ==
Parkton to Sumter
State	Milepost	City/Location	Station	Connections and notes
NC	AG 223.0	Parkton	Parkton	junction with Atlantic Coast Line Railroad Main Line
NC	AG 224.7		McNatt's	
NC	AG 227.6	Lumber Bridge	Lumber Bridge	
NC	AG 235.5	Red Springs	Red Springs	
NC	AG 240.1	Wakulla	Wakulla	
NC	AG 247.1	Maxton	Maxton	junction with Seaboard Air Line Railroad Wilmington Subdivision
NC	AG 253.2		John's	junction with Laurinburg and Southern Railroad
NC	AG 255.3		Hasty	
SC	AG 259.5	McColl	McColl	junction with Seaboard Air Line Railroad Andrews Subdivision
SC	AG 262.2	Tatum	Tatum	
SC	AG 268.2	Bennettsville	Bennettsville	junction with: Gibson Branch; Bennettsville and Cheraw Railroad
SC	AG 274.0		Marlboro	
SC	AG 285.3	Mont Clare	Mont Clare	
SC	AG 292.8	Darlington	Darlington	junction with: Atlantic Coast Line Railroad Wadesboro—Florence Line; Seaboard Air Line Railroad Hartsville Subdivision
SC	AG 300.2		Syracuse	
SC	AG 307.3	Lamar	Lamar	
SC	AG 314.3	Elliott	Elliott	junction with Bishopville Branch
SC	AG 318.7	St. Charles	St. Charles	
SC	AG 324.3		Oswego	
SC	AG 331.8	Sumter	Sumter	junction with: Florence—Robbins Line; Sumter—Columbia Line; Sumter–Lanes Line; Seaboard Air Line Railroad Sumter Subdivision

Gibson Branch
State	Milepost	City/Location	Station	Connections and notes
SC	AGA 268.2	Bennettsville	Bennettsville	junction with Parkton—Sumter Line
SC	AGA 272.1	Breeden	Breeden	
SC	AGA 274.1		Lester	
SC	AGA 276.2		Newtonville	
NC	AGA 280.2	Gibson	Gibson	junction with: Seaboard Air Line Railroad Andrews Subdivision; Rockingham Railroad
