= East Carolina Line =

Seaboard Air Line Railroad freight line in South Carolina

Overview
- Other name(s): Andrews Subdivision; Charleston Subdivision
- Status: still operating north of Charleston under CSX
- Owner: Seaboard Air Line Railroad
- Termini: Hamlet, North Carolina; Savannah, Georgia

Technical
- Line length: 258.2 mi (415.5 km)
- Electrification: No
- Signalling: Centralized traffic control

The Seaboard Air Line Railroad's East Carolina Line (H Line) was the unofficial name of their line running from Hamlet, North Carolina through eastern South Carolina to Savannah, Georgia. Officially designated on Seaboard employee timetables as the Andrews Subdivision from Hamlet to Andrews, South Carolina, and the Charleston Subdivision from Andrews south, the line was known as the East Carolina Line by Seaboard employees due to its location in eastern South Carolina. With connections to the Seaboard's main line at both ends, the East Carolina Line was frequently used as an alternative freight route for the company.

The line is still in service between Hamlet and Charleston as the Andrews Subdivision today and it is operated by Seaboard successor, CSX Transportation.

== Route description ==
The East Carolina Line began in Hamlet, North Carolina at East Junction, where it split from the company's Wilmington Subdivision. East Junction was located just east of the Seaboard's major junction with its main line at Hamlet station.

From East Junction, the East Carolina Line ran southeast into South Carolina, passing through Dillon, Mullins, and Andrews before reaching Charleston.

Beyond Charleston, it continued southwest through the coastal marshes of the South Carolina Lowcountry and passing through Lobeco, Levy, and into Georgia. In Georgia, it entered Savannah via Hutchinson Island and reconnected with their main line at Bridge Junction in Savannah.

== History ==
=== 1884-1915: Formation and early years ===
The East Carolina Line from Hamlet to Charleston was built by the Seaboard Air Line Railroad's predecessor companies. The first segment to be built was from Hamlet to Gibson, North Carolina which was built in 1884 by the Raleigh and Augusta Air Line Railroad. The Raleigh and Augusta Air Line Railroad became part of the Seaboard Air Line Railway (later known as the Seaboard Air Line Railroad) in 1901.

The line from Gibson south to Poston was built by the North and South Carolina Railway, who also took over operations on the Seaboard Air Line's track from Hamlet to Gibson. The North and South Carolina Railway's track from Gibson to Dillon, South Carolina was complete in 1909, and it was extended south to Mullins in 1910 and to the Pee Dee River near Poston in 1911. Also in 1911, the Georgetown and Western Railroad built track from Andrews, South Carolina north to Poston and to the Pee Dee River to connect with the North and South Carolina Railway with bridge over the river being jointly owned by both companies.

In 1914, the North and South Carolina Railway, the Georgetown and Western Railroad, and other nearly railroads were merged into the Carolina, Atlantic and Western Railway. In 1915, the Carolina, Atlantic and Western Railway extended the line from Andrews south to Charleston. By the end of 1915, the Seaboard Air Line acquired the Carolina, Atlantic and Western Railway. The Seaboard Air Line would designate the line as the Andrews Subdivision from Hamlet to Andrews, and the Charleston Subdivision south of Andrews to Charleston.

=== 1915-1917: Extension to Savannah ===
In the early 1900s, the Seaboard Air Line was looking to improve the efficiency of their network, particularly moving freight. Extending the Charleston Subdivision south to Savannah was quickly seen as an effective way to provide an additional freight route. At this point, the Seaboard had a short spur from Savannah to Hutchinson Island that had been in place since 1899 to serve businesses there. Plans were made for this spur to be used to connect the extension into Savannah. In preparation for the extension, the spur's swing bridge over the Savannah River was rebuilt as a bascule bridge for heavy freight use.

Construction to extend the line from Charleston to Savannah began in 1915. A construction crew began at Charleston and headed south while a second construction crew began at Hutchinson Island and headed north. The extension was completed in 1917 and it began service on December 31 of that year.

=== 1917-1967: Height of operation ===
With a connection to the Seaboard Air Line's main line at both ends, the East Carolina Line became the company's primary freight route between Hamlet and Savannah. Since it was closer to the coast, the East Carolina Line was flatter and straighter making it better suited for freight than the main line, which existed further west through Columbia (which was then primarily used for passenger service). The East Carolina Line was busy enough in the 1940s to warrant the installation of Centralized traffic control signals in 1949. Further improvements to the line included the replacement of the bascule bridge over the Savannah River with a lift bridge in 1952. While it was primarily a freight route, the Seaboard Air Line did run local passenger service on the East Carolina Line until 1956. By 1957, at least three freight trains were running East Carolina Line round-trip from Hamlet to Savannah daily.

The East Carolina Line also had the added benefit of having a more direct route between Charleston and Savannah than the Seaboard Air Line's competitor, the Atlantic Coast Line Railroad, whose main line between the two cities was located a short distance to the west.

=== 1967-present: Mergers and consolidation ===
In 1967, the Seaboard Air Line (SAL) merged with the Atlantic Coast Line (ACL) to form the Seaboard Coast Line Railroad (SCL). In the wake of the merger, it was determined that the East Carolina Line from Charleston to Savannah was largely unnecessary as a through route in the combined network due to the existence of the parallel A Line (the former ACL main line) just a short distance to the west. By October of that year, the line was abandoned between Charleston and Lobeco. After the line south of Charleston was abandoned, the Andrews Subdivision designation was extended south to Charleston as it is today. The Charleston Subdivision designation was then reused for the A Line (ex-ACL main line) between Florence and Savannah as it is today.

The remaining line from Lobeco to Savannah remained in service since it still had some freight customers along it. It was redesignated as the Coosaw Subdivision and could be accessed at Coosaw through the Port Royal Subdivision (a former ACL branch). The SCL would temporarily reroute all traffic from the A Line to the Coosaw Subdivision shortly after the merger while they rebuilt the A Line's bridge over the Savannah River.

On April 21, 1971, the Coosaw Subdivision's lift bridge over the Savannah River was destroyed when it was struck by a vessel. The company still had to access a flat yard and freight customers on Hutchinson Island at the time. However, the Seaboard Coast Line quickly determined replacing the bridge was too costly since the island could still be accessed through Coosaw despite the added distance of that route. By then, the remaining Centralized traffic control system was decommissioned and removed and a local freight train continued to operate the Coosaw Subdivision to Hutchinson Island.

In an effort to shorten the distance from Savannah to Hutchinson Island, the company built a connection from the A Line at South Hardeeville east to the Coosaw Subdivision just south of Levy in 1978. The company then abandoned the remaining Coosaw Subdivision north of Levy, with the remaining track and the connection track being designated as the Hutchinson Island Subdivision.

In 1980, the Seaboard Coast Line's parent company merged with the Chessie System, creating the CSX Corporation. The CSX Corporation initially operated the Chessie and Seaboard Systems separately until 1986, when they were merged into CSX Transportation. The remaining Hutchinson Island Subdivision was abandoned in 1996 when freight service was no longer needed.

== Current operations ==
=== Andrews Subdivision ===
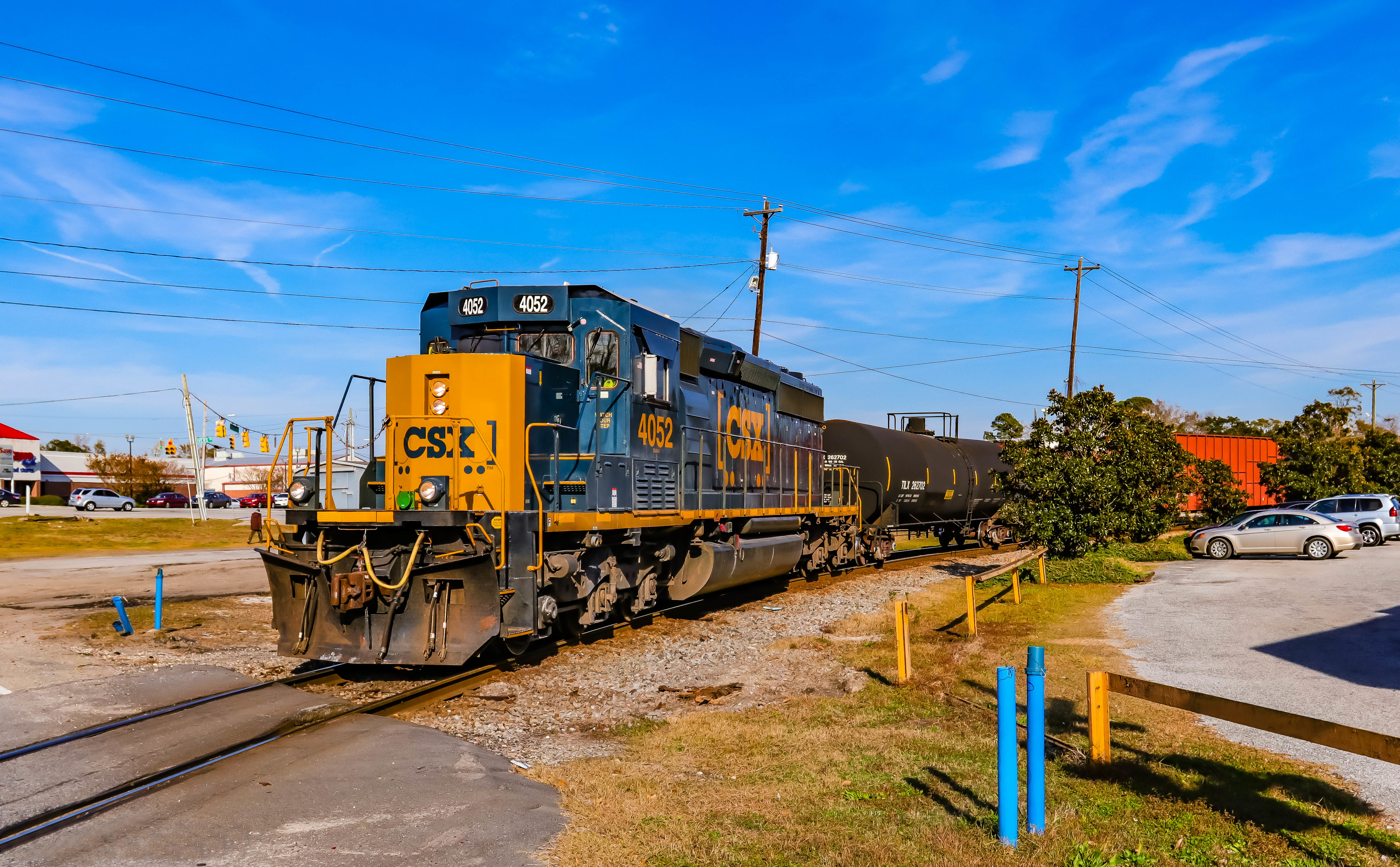
A CSX locomotive on the former East Carolina Line in Charleton, South Carolina (Photo by Reginald McDowell).

The segment of the line from East Junction in Hamlet to Charleston is still in service as CSX's Andrews Subdivision. It now connects to the A Line in Charleston just north of Ashley Junction.

CSX continues to provide freight service to local communities along the line. It also interchanges with the Pee Dee River Railway in McColl, the R.J. Corman Railroad Group in Mullins, and the East Cooper & Berkeley Railroad in Cordesville.

=== South of Charleston ===
Within Savannah, the only piece of the line still in service is CSX's Savannah River Lead, which runs a short distance from the main lines up to the Savannah River.

Between Savannah and Charleston, the line is abandoned but some of its infrastructure is still in place. A number of bridges are still standing along the route and some of them have been turned into fishing piers. A portion of the bridge over the Broad River was turned into the Knowles Island Fishing Pier in 1980 but the pier portion was destroyed by a fire in 1984. A new smaller pier was later built at the site. The center portion of the bridge including the swing span (which is locked open) remain abandoned in the middle of the river. Another bridge near Lobeco is now the Wimbee Fishing Pier. Access roads to these fishing piers runs on the line's former right of way.

The West Ashley Bikeway runs along the former right of way on the south side of Charleston. Near Levy, the New River Linear Trail, an unpaved nature trail, runs along the former right of way.

An overpass that carried the 1978 connection from South Hardeeville over U.S. Route 17 still stands unused near Limehouse.

== Historic stations ==
State	Milepost	City/Location	Station	Connections and notes
NC	SH 253.4	Hamlet	Hamlet	junction with Seaboard Air Line Railroad Main Line
NC	SH 254.3	Hamlet	East Junction	junction with Wilmington Subdivision
NC	SH 259.1		Scholl	
NC	SH 263.7	Gibson	Gibson	junction with: Atlantic Coast Line Railroad Gibson Branch; Rockingham Railroad
SC	SH 267.4		Fletcher	
SC	SH 271.0	McColl	McColl	junction with Atlantic Coast Line Railroad Parkton—Sumter Line
SC	SH 277.5	Clio	Clio	
SC	SH 283.3		Minturn	
SC	SH 288.2		Little Rock	
SC	SH 292.4	Dillon	Dillon	junction with Atlantic Coast Line Railroad Main Line
SC	SH 299.5		Floydale	
SC	SH 309.4	Mullins	Mullins	junction with Atlantic Coast Line Railroad Wilmington—Pee Dee Line
SC	SH 317.2		Rains	
SC	SH 325.7		Eulonia	
SC	SH 334.0		Poston	junction with Hartsville Subdivision
SC	SH 338.3	Johnsonville	Johnsonville	
SC	SH 342.6	Hemingway	Hemingway	
SC	SH 354.1		Morrisville	
SC	SH 360.9		Warsaw	
SC	SH 365.5	Andrews	Andrews	junction with Georgetown Subdivision
SC	SH 373.2		Oceda	
SC	SH 378.0	Jamestown	Jamestown	
SC	SH 388.0		Herberta	
SC	SH 394.2		Cordesville	
SC	SH 403.0		Pine Grove	
SC	SH 408.2		Inness	
SC	SH 412.6		Remount	
SC	SH 418.4	Charleston	Cooper Yard	
SC	SH 421.8	Charleston	Grove Street Station	junction with South Carolina Railroad (SOU)
SC	SH 424.3	Charleston	Albemarle	
SC	SH 426.3	Charleston	Dupont	junction with Atlantic Coast Line Railroad Croghans Branch
SC	SH 431.0		Stono	
SC	SH 436.0	Meggett	Yonges	junction with Atlantic Coast Line Railroad Yonges Island Branch
SC	SH 440.8		Towles	
SC	SH 448.6		Grimball	
SC	SH 455.7		Airy Hall	
SC	SH 465.3		Williman	
SC	SH 471.0		Lobeco	
SC	SH 472.8		Coosaw	junction with Charleston and Western Carolina Railway (ACL)
SC	SH 475.6		Hank	
SC	SH 483.9		Boyd	
SC	SH 492.5		Okeetee	
SC	SH 498.7		Pritchard	
SC	SH 501.9		Levy	
GA	SH 510.5	Savannah	Bridge Junction	junction with: Main Line; Savannah Subdivision
GA		Savannah	Savannah Union Station	

== See also ==
- Main Line (Seaboard Air Line Railroad)
