= Pee Dee Bridge Company =

American railroad company

The Pee Dee Bridge Company was a South Carolina railroad company that operated in the early part of the 20th century.

The Pee Dee Bridge Company was chartered by the South Carolina General Assembly in 1911.

The Pee Dee Bridge Company owned and operated 1.08 miles of track across the Pee Dee River near Poston, South Carolina.

It was sold to the Carolina, Atlantic and Western Railway in September 1915 and later that year became part of the Seaboard Air Line Railway.
