= Hopewell Subdivision =

Railway line in Virginia

The Hopewell Subdivision is a railroad line owned by CSX Transportation in the U.S. state of Virginia. It begins in Bellwood, Virginia and runs southeast to its terminus in Hopewell, Virginia, a distance of 15.7 miles (25.3 km).

== History ==
The Hopewell Subdivision was developed in the early 1900's by the Seaboard Air Line Railroad. The Hopewell Subdivision connected with the Seaboard Air Line's main line (which is today the Bellwood Subdivision) in Bellwood. The Hopewell Subdivision's current swing bridge over the Appomattox River was built in 1924.

In 1967, the Seaboard Air Line merged with its rival, the Atlantic Coast Line Railroad (ACL), and the merged company was named the Seaboard Coast Line Railroad (SCL). In 1980, the Seaboard Coast Line's parent company merged with the Chessie System, creating the CSX Corporation. The CSX Corporation initially operated the Chessie and Seaboard Systems separately until 1986, when they were merged into CSX Transportation.

The Hopewell Subdivision's swing bridge over the Appomattox River has been remotely operated since 2017.

== See also ==
- List of CSX Transportation lines
