= Northeastern Railroad (South Carolina) =

Overview
- Successor: Atlantic Coast Line Railroad; Seaboard Coast Line Railroad

Technical
- Track gauge: 4 ft 8 1/2 in (1,435 mm) standard gauge
- Previous gauge: 4 ft 9 in (1,448 mm)

The Northeastern Railroad was a 103-mile (166 km) 5 ft (1,524 mm) gauge railroad that served South Carolina in the second half of the 19th century.

== History ==
Chartered in 1851, it was completed in 1856 and ran from Charleston, South Carolina, to Florence, South Carolina, connecting with the Wilmington and Manchester Railroad.

The lines original Charleston station was located on Chapel Street near what is now the Charleston Historic District.

The Northeastern Railroad jointly leased the Central Railroad of South Carolina with Wilmington, Columbia and Augusta Railroad.

By the late 1880s, it was one of the larger carriers based in South Carolina, with 24 locomotives and nearly 350 cars.

In 1877, the Ashley River Railroad was built from the line in North Charleston which connected the Northeastern Railroad to the Plant System of railroads (which extended further into the southeast and to Florida).

The Northeastern Railroad became part of the Atlantic Coast Line Railroad in 1898. It became a segment of the Atlantic Coast Line's main line. Under the Atlantic Coast Line's ownership, the original Charleston station was replaced in 1905 by Charleston Union Station (which was located at East Bay and Columbus Streets). Charleston Union Station burned down in 1947 and the Atlantic Coast Line built a new station in 1956, which was then replaced by the current North Charleston station in 2018.

In 1967, the Atlantic Coast Line merged with its rival, the Seaboard Air Line Railroad (who also operated line through Charleston). The merged company was named the Seaboard Coast Line Railroad. In 1980, the Seaboard Coast Line's parent company merged with the Chessie System, creating the CSX Corporation. The CSX Corporation initially operated the Chessie and Seaboard Systems separately until 1986, when they were merged into CSX Transportation.

The line remains in service today as part of CSX's A Line (Charleston Subdivision).

== Historic stations ==
Milepost	City/Location	Station	Connections and notes
A 292.7	Florence	Florence	Amtrak Silver Meteor, Palmetto station rebuilt in 1910 junction with: Wilmington and Manchester Railroad (ACL); Cheraw and Darlington Railroad (ACL); South Carolina Western Railway (SAL)
		Howe	
A 300.0		Java	
A 303.3		Effingham	
		New Hope	
A 309.4	Coward	Coward	
A 313.7	Scranton	Scranton	
A 316.1	Lake City	Lake City	
A 322.2	Cades	Cades	
A 326.1		Brockington	
A 331.1	Kingstree	Kingstree	Amtrak Silver Meteor, Palmetto station rebuilt in 1909
A 336.5		Salters	
A 341.1	Lane	Lane	junction with: Central Railroad of South Carolina (ACL); Georgetown and Western Railroad (SAL)
A 343.7		Gourdin	
A 349.6	St. Stephen	St. Stephen	
A 356.7	Bonneau	Bonneau	
		MacBeth	
A 365.0	Moncks Corner	Moncks Corner	
A 370.4		Oakley	
A 372.6		Strawberry	
A 376.1		Mount Holly	
A 380.1		Otranto	
A 383.3	Hanahan	Hanahan	
		The Farms	
		Eight-Mile Turnout	
A 388.4	North Charleston	Ashley Junction	junction with Ashley River Railroad (SF&W/ACL)
	Charleston	Charleston	original station located at Chapel Street replaced by Charleston Union Station junction with South Carolina Railroad (SOU)

== See also ==
- Charleston Subdivision
