= Charleston and Savannah Railway =

Railway in South Carolina and Georgia

Overview
- Successor: Plant System; Atlantic Coast Line Railroad; Seaboard Coast Line Railroad

Technical
- Track gauge: 4 ft 8 1/2 in (1,435 mm) standard gauge
- Previous gauge: 4 ft 9 in (1,448 mm)

The Charleston and Savannah Railway was a 19th-century American railroad serving the coastal states of South Carolina and Georgia and running through part of the South Carolina Lowcountry. Its name varied slightly over time:

- Charleston and Savannah Railroad (1854–1866)
- Savannah and Charleston Railroad (1866–1880)
- Charleston and Savannah Railway (1880–1901)

== History ==
The system was originally chartered in 1854 as the Charleston and Savannah Railroad. The C&S RR established and operated a 120-mile (190 km) 5 ft (1,524 mm) gauge rail line from Charleston, South Carolina, to Savannah, Georgia, connecting two of the most important port cities in the antebellum southeastern United States. South Carolina state senator Thomas Drayton was the president of the railroad from its earliest planning stages in 1853 until 1856.

During the Civil War, control of the railroad was vital to the protection of Savannah and keeping nearby Confederate troops supplied with food and materiel. In December 1864, during his March to the Sea, Maj. Gen. William T. Sherman sent part of his Union forces forward to cut the line, which would force Confederate general William Hardee to retreat and abandon Savannah. The mission failed, but sections of the railroad would be severely damaged during Sherman's subsequent 1865 Carolinas campaign.

Following the war, the railroad was reorganized in 1866 as the Savannah and Charleston Railroad but did not complete repairs and reopen for traffic as a 4 ft 8 1/2 in (1,435 mm) standard gauge line until 1869-70. In 1873 it defaulted on a loan and ended up in bankruptcy. It was then sold to Henry B. Plant (June, 1880s), and the railroad's name was changed to the Charleston and Savannah Railway, becoming part of the Plant System of railroads.

In 1877, the Ashley River Railroad (another Plant System Railroad) was built. The Ashley River Railroad connected to the Charleston and Savannah Railway at Johns Island and ran across the Ashley River to connect with the Northeastern Railroad in North Charleston. The Charleston and Savannah Railway previously connected to other railroads via a ferry across the river.

In the 1880s, the Plant System built the Yonges Island Branch which branched off the main line at Ravenel. This now-abandoned branch ran through Hollywood and Meggett.

Later, the Plant System was sold to the Atlantic Coast Line Railroad in 1902. The Charleston and Savannah Railway and the Ashley River Railroad would become part of the Atlantic Coast Line's main line (which extended in its entirety from Richmond, Virginia to Tampa, Florida). The Hardeville to Savannah track was also used by the Southern Railway to connect a Columbia-Hardeville section of track to Florida.

The original line east of Johns Island would become known as the Croghans Branch after the Ashley River Railroad began service. The Croghans Branch has since been abandoned and its right of way is now the West Ashley Greenway.

In 1967, the Atlantic Coast Line merged with its rival, the Seaboard Air Line Railroad. The merged company was named the Seaboard Coast Line Railroad. In 1980, the Seaboard Coast Line's parent company merged with the Chessie System, creating the CSX Corporation. The CSX Corporation initially operated the Chessie and Seaboard Systems separately until 1986, when they were merged into CSX Transportation. The line is still in service from Johns Island to Savannah and it is part of CSX's A Line (Charleston Subdivision).

== Historic stations ==
Charleston to Savannah
State	Milepost	City/Location	Station	Connections and notes
SC	AM 408.0	Charleston	Croghans	near Albemarle Point
SC	AM 406.4	Charleston	St. Andrews	
SC	AM 404.3	Charleston	Wappoo	
SC	AM 403.9	Charleston	DuPont	junction with Seaboard Air Line Railroad Charleston Subdivision
SC		Charleston	Melvin	
SC	AM 398.7; A 398.7	Johns Island	Johns Island	junction with Ashley River Railroad (ACL)
SC	A 402.0		Rantowles	
SC	A 403.2		Berry Hill	
SC	A 406.7	Ravenel	Ravenel	junction with Yonges Island Branch
SC	A 409.1		New Road	
SC	A 412.9	Adam's Run	Adam's Run	
SC	A 415.8	Parkers Ferry	Parkers Ferry	
SC	A 418.1		Pon Pon	
SC	A 419.2	Jacksonboro	Jacksonboro	
SC			Edash	
SC	A 424.9		Ashepoo	
SC	A 428.7	Green Pond	Green Pond	junction with Green Pond, Walterboro and Branchville Railroad
SC	A 432.3		White Hall	
SC			Blakes	
SC	A 440.8	Salkehatchie	Salkehatchie	
SC	A 443.0	Yemassee	Yemassee	Amtrak Silver Meteor, Palmetto parts of the station rebuilt in 1955 junction with Charleston and Western Carolina Railway (ACL)
SC	A 444.2	Pocotaligo	Pocotaligo	
SC	A 446.5		Kress	
SC	A 449.6		Gilmania	
SC	A 451.4	Coosawhatchie	Coosawhatchie	
SC	A 454.5		Bashan	
SC	A 459.3	Ridgeland	Ridgeland	
SC			Okeetee	
SC			Perrys	
SC			Ferebee	
SC	A 473.9	Hardeeville	Hardeeville	
SC		Purysburg	Purysburg	
SC	A 478.5		Sand Island	
GA	A 483.9	Port Wentworth	Monteith	
GA	A 490.4	Savannah	Central Junction	junction with: South Bound Railroad (FC&P/SAL); Savannah and Atlantic Railroad (CoG)
GA	A 490.9	Savannah	Savannah	continues as Savannah, Florida and Western Railway (ACL) junction with Georgia and Alabama Railway (SAL)

Yonges Island Branch
Milepost	City/Location	Station	Connections and notes
AMB 406.7	Ravenel	Ravenel	junction with Main Line
AMB 408.2	Meggett	Meggett	junction with Seaboard Air Line Railroad Charleston Subdivision
AMB 411.2		Yonges Island	

== See also ==
- Charleston Subdivision
