= South Carolina Western Railway Station (Darlington, South Carolina) =

Historic railroad station in South Carolina, US

- U.S. National Register of Historic Places
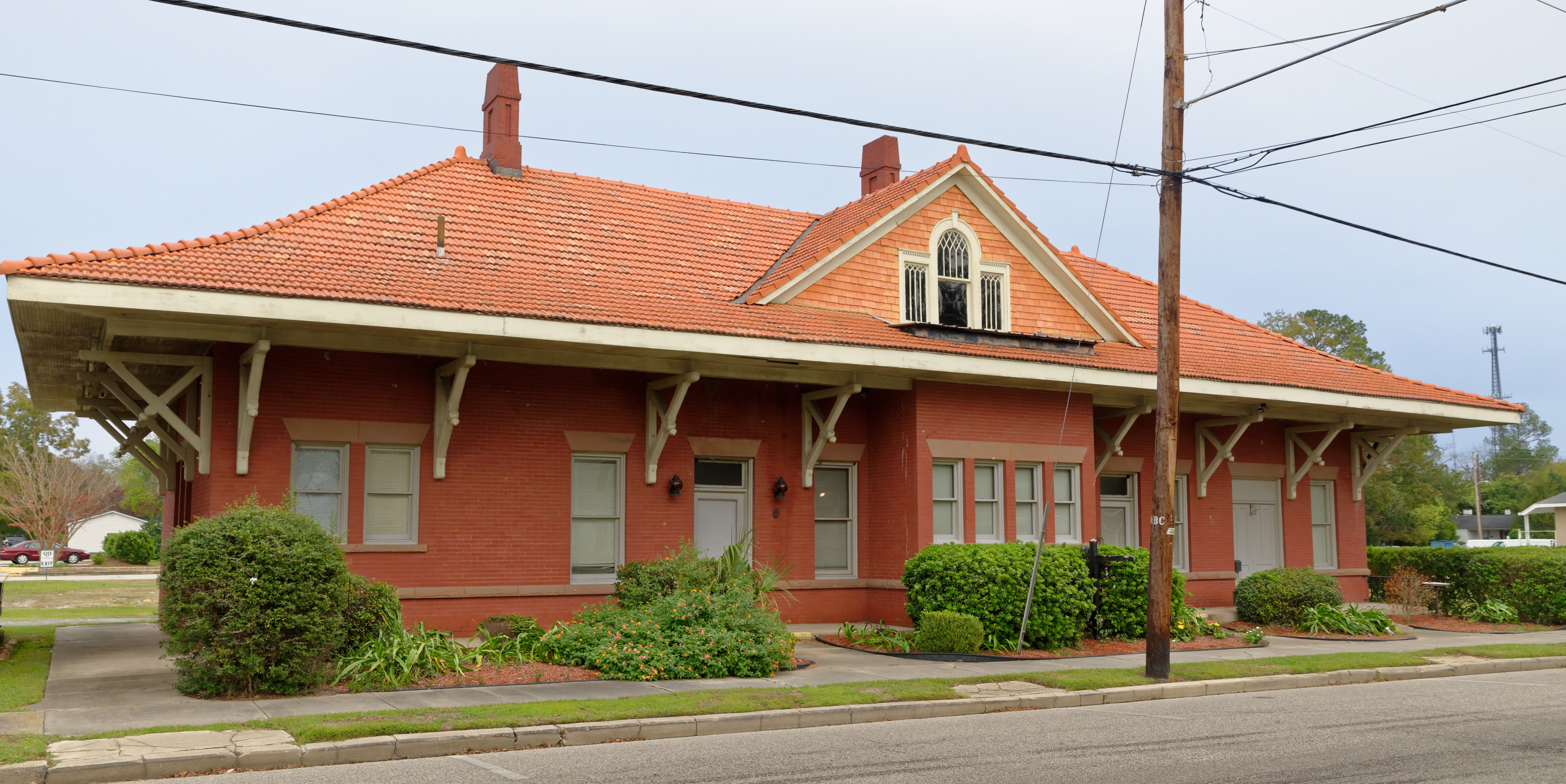

- Location within South Carolina Location within the United States
- Location: 129 Russell St., Darlington, South Carolina
- Coordinates: 34°18′13″N 79°52′8″W
- Area: less than one acre
- Built: 1911
- Built by: Reese, Lawrence
- MPS: City of Darlington MRA
- NRHP reference No.: 88000040
- Added to NRHP: February 10, 1988

South Carolina Western Railway Station, also known as the Seaboard Air Line Railway Station, is a historic train station located at Darlington, Darlington County, South Carolina. It was built in 1911 by the South Carolina Western Railway and is a rectangular brick building with projecting rectangular bays at the center of two sides. The hipped roof features a bell-cast profile, red clay tile, wide bracketed eaves, and intersecting gables. Each gable contains a Palladian window. Lawrence Reese, an African-American master carpenter who had constructed many houses in Darlington, built the station.

It was listed on the National Register of Historic Places in 1988.

Preceding station	Seaboard Air Line Railroad	Following station
Hartsville toward McBee	Hartsville Subdivision	Florence toward Poston
