= Franklinton station =

- Franklinton Depot
- U.S. National Register of Historic Places
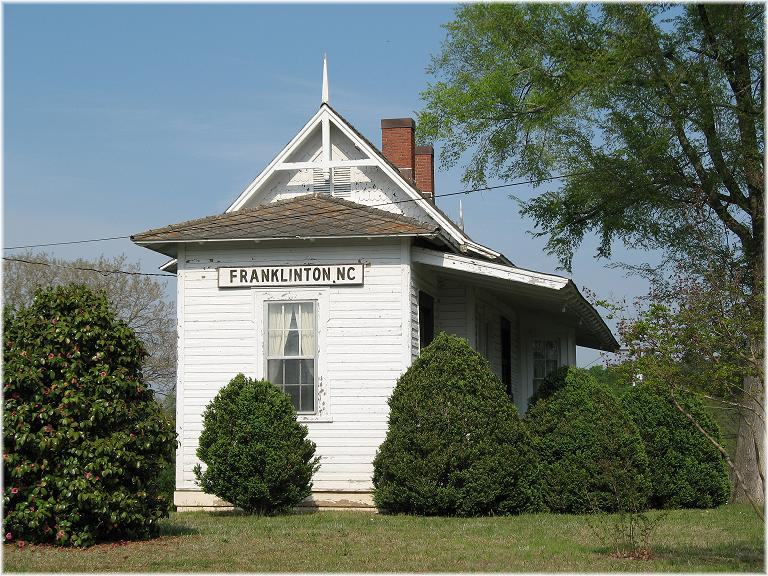
- The historic Franklinton Depot located in Franklinton, North Carolina.

- Location within North Carolina Location within the United States
- Location: 61-21 E. Mason St., Franklinton, North Carolina
- Coordinates: 36°6′11″N 78°27′20″W
- Area: 0.4 acres (0.16 ha)
- Built: 1886
- Architect: Raleigh & Gaston Railroad; Winder, John C.
- Architectural style: Queen Anne, Italianate, Gothic Revival
- NRHP reference No.: 90001941
- Added to NRHP: December 27, 1990

Franklinton Depot, also known as the Raleigh and Gaston Railroad Passenger Depot and Franklinton Woman's Club Clubhouse, is a historic train station located at 201 East Mason Street in Franklinton, Franklin County, North Carolina. It was built by the Raleigh and Gaston Railroad in 1886, and is a one-story, rectangular frame building with Italianate, Queen Anne, and Gothic Revival style design elements. The main section measures 51 feet by 16 feet, with an attached 10 feet by 12 feet baggage room. The main section has a steeply pitched gable roof and baggage room a low-pitched hip roof. It served the Seaboard Air Line's Palmland (New York - St. Petersburg and Miami) as well as local service between Norlina and Hamlet.

It was moved to its present location in 1973 when acquired by the Franklinton Woman's Club as a clubhouse.

It was listed on the National Register of Historic Places in 1990.

Preceding station	Seaboard Air Line Railroad	Following station
Wake Forest toward Tampa or Miami	Main Line	Henderson toward Richmond
