= North and South Carolina Railway =

20th century railway company in the Southeastern United States

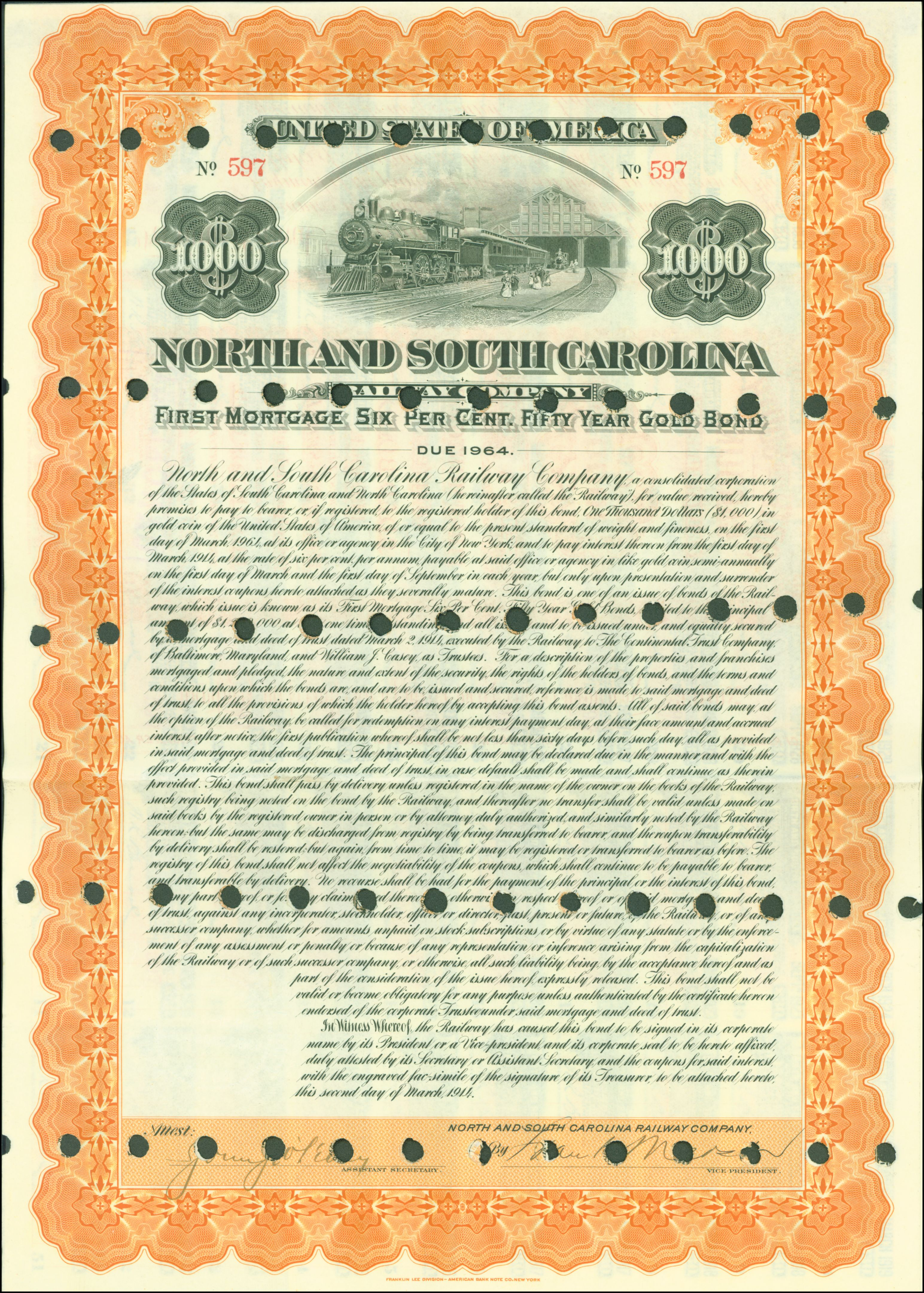
Gold Bond of the North and South Carolina Railway Company, issued 2. March 1914

The North and South Carolina Railway was a Southeastern railroad that operated in the Carolinas in the early part of the 20th century.

The North and South Carolina Railway Company (of South Carolina) was chartered by the South Carolina General Assembly in 1908.

In 1911, the North and South Carolina Railway Company (of South Carolina) and the North and South Carolina Railway Company (of North Carolina) were consolidated.

The North and South Carolina Railway ran from Gibson, North Carolina, to a connection with the Georgetown and Western Railway at the Pee Dee River, with less than a mile of the carrier's route lying within North Carolina.

The North and South Carolina Railroad also operated a 10-mile stretch of track between Gibson and Hamlet, North Carolina, owned by the Seaboard Air Line Railroad.

In 1914, the South Carolina Western Railway, the South Carolina Western Extension Railway and the Charleston Northern Railway were merged into the North and South Carolina Railway to form the Carolina, Atlantic and Western Railway.

That same year, the North and South Carolina Railroad merged with the Georgetown and Western Railway.

The portion between Poston, South Carolina and Hamlet, North Carolina is now part of the CSX Andrews Subdivision.
