= Georgetown and Western Railroad =

Railroad in South Carolina

Overview
- Reporting mark: G&W
- Locale: South Carolina
- Dates of operation: 1886–1915
- Predecessor: Georgetown and Lane's Railroad
- Successor: Carolina, Atlantic and Western Railway; Seaboard Air Line Railroad; Seaboard Coast Line Railroad; CSX Transportation

Technical
- Track gauge: 5 ft (1,524 mm)

The Georgetown and Western Railroad was a Southeastern railroad that served South Carolina in the late 19th century and early 20th century. At its greatest extent, it ran from Lane, South Carolina east to the port city of Georgetown.

== History ==
The Georgetown and Western Railroad was first chartered as the Georgetown and Lane's Railroad in 1881 by the South Carolina General Assembly. The Georgetown and Lane's Railroad began operation two years later. In 1885, it went into receivership and was sold at foreclosure a year later. Afterward, the line was renamed the Georgetown and Western Railroad.

The Georgetown and Western was sold in 1900 to a syndicate that controlled the Georgetown-based Atlantic Lumber Company.

The Georgetown and Western was in receivership from 1902 to 1912. The Seaboard Air Line Railway subsequently took an interest in the carrier and gave it financial assistance. In 1911, the Georgetown and Western Railroad built a branch from Andrews north to the Pee Dee River near Poston.

In May 1915, the Georgetown and Western Railroad was absorbed by the Carolina, Atlantic and Western Railway, which became part of Seaboard Air Line Railway later that year. The Seaboard Air Line would operate the line as their Georgetown Subdivision. The branch to the Pee Dee River became part of the Seaboard's East Carolina Line.

The Seaboard Air Line abandoned the line from Andrews to Lane in the 1940s.

In 1967, the Seaboard Air Line (SAL) merged with the Atlantic Coast Line (ACL) to form the Seaboard Coast Line Railroad (SCL). In 1980, the Seaboard Coast Line's parent company merged with the Chessie System, creating the CSX Corporation.

== Current conditions ==
=== Georgetown Subdivision ===
The line is still in service from Andrews to Georgetown, and is still known as the Georgetown Subdivision. CSX serves an International Paper mill in Georgetown. It also serves the Winyah Generating Station, a power plant located at the end of the line's Pennyroyal Spur (which was built in the 1970s).

=== West of Andrews ===
The right of way of the abandoned segment west of Andrews has since been converted into a roadway. The road is named Seaboard Road, a reference to the Seaboard Air Line Railroad.

== Historic stations ==
| Milepost | City/Location | Station | Connections and notes |
|---|---|---|---|
| SHA 0.0 | Georgetown | Georgetown | |
| SHA 11.0 | | Olin | |
| SHA 12.1 | | Kent | |
| SHA 16.3 | Andrews | Andrews | junction with East Carolina Line |
| 17.6 | Andrews | West Andrews | |
| 21.2 | | Earle | |
| 26.1 | | Trio | |
| 28.5 | | Blakely | |
| 30.0 | | Taft | |
| 32.9 | | Carris | |
| 36.0 | Lane | Lane | junction with: Northeastern Railroad (ACL); Central Railroad of South Carolina (ACL) |

== See also ==
- List of CSX Transportation lines
