= Raleigh and Gaston / Seaboard Coast Line Building =

Historic building in North Carolina, US

- Seaboard Coast Line Railroad Company Office Building
- U.S. National Register of Historic Places
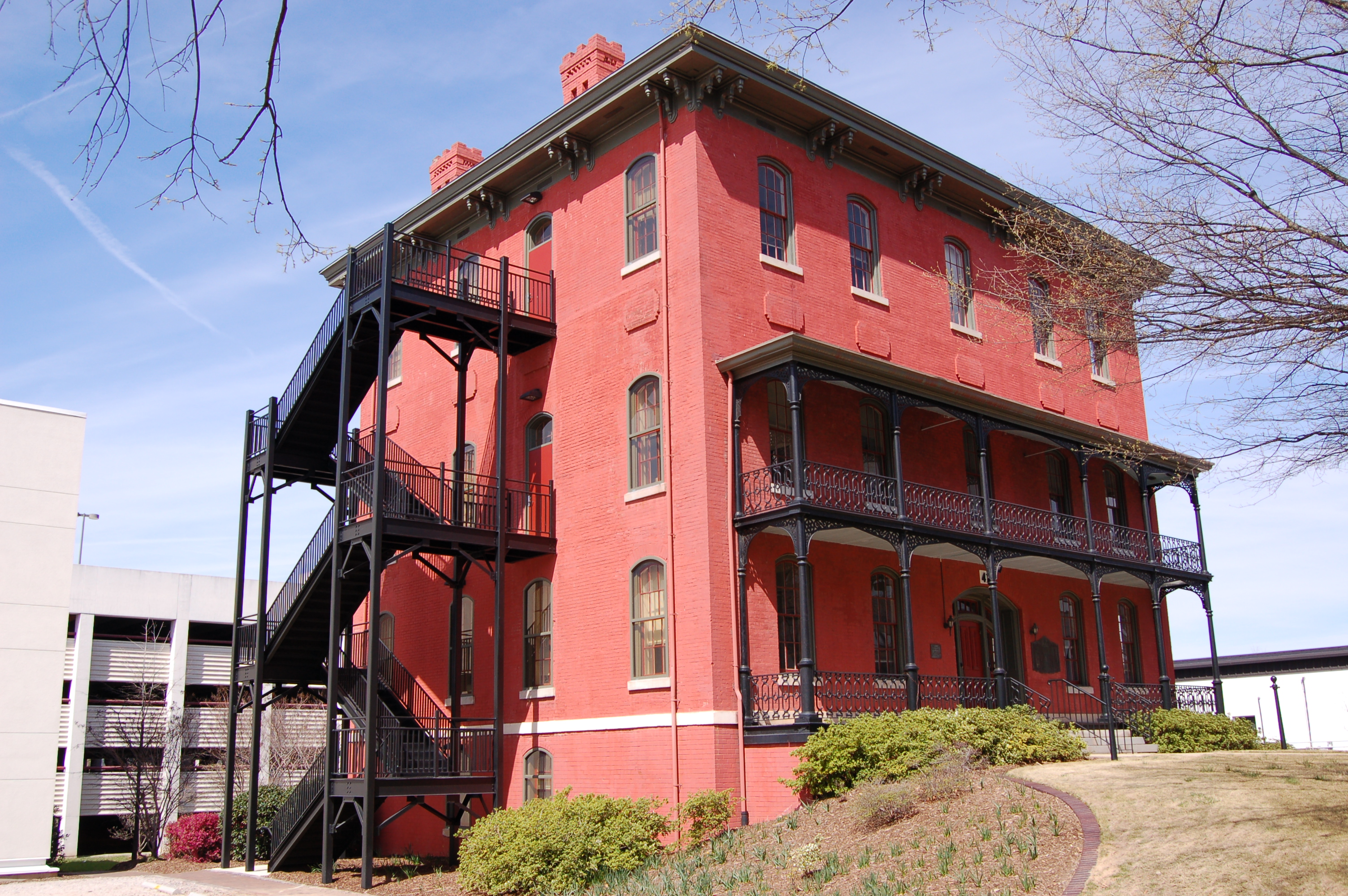
- Raleigh and Gaston / Seaboard Coast Line Building at its new 413 North Salisbury Street location

- Location within North Carolina Location within the United States
- Location: Raleigh, Wake County, North Carolina, U.S.A.
- Coordinates: 35°47′8″N 78°38′25″W
- Area: 0.5 acres (0.20 ha)
- Built: 1862
- NRHP reference No.: 71000626
- Added to NRHP: May 6, 1971

The Raleigh and Gaston / Seaboard Coast Line Building is an historic building in Raleigh, North Carolina, that was once home to the Raleigh and Gaston Railroad and subsequently the Raleigh office of the Seaboard Coast Line Railroad. The three-story brick building is one of Raleigh's earliest surviving office buildings and served as a railroad office for more than 100 years.

The first train to arrive in Raleigh came in 1840, five years after the Raleigh and Gaston Railroad was chartered. The railroad was sold under foreclosure and taken over by the State of North Carolina in 1845. Private stockholders were later able to acquire a controlling interest from the state, in 1867. The building was commissioned while the railroad was under state control and construction of two stories was started in 1861. A third and final story had been added by 1891. The Raleigh and Gaston Railroad and several associated railroads formed the Seaboard Air Line Railroad in 1893, and later merged with the Atlantic Coast Line Railroad to form the Seaboard Coast Line Railroad in 1967.

The building was listed on the National Register of Historic Places on May 6, 1971, at its original location of 325 Halifax Street. At that time, the building was still in use for its original purpose as a railroad company office. The state of North Carolina purchased the land in 1977 and moved the building to its present location at 413 North Salisbury Street, re-designating it as a Raleigh Historic Landmark in 1990. Since 2015 the building has served as the headquarters of the North Carolina Department of Military and Veterans Affairs.

== See also ==
- Raleigh and Gaston Railroad
- National Register of Historic Places listings in Wake County, North Carolina
