= East and West Railroad of Alabama =

Overview
- Locale: Alabama, Georgia

Technical
- Track gauge: 4 ft 8 1/2 in (1,435 mm) standard gauge
- Previous gauge: 3 ft (914 mm) and prior to that 5 ft (1,524 mm)

The East and West Railroad of Alabama was a railroad in the U.S. states of Alabama and Georgia. The railroad started out with 3 ft (914 mm) narrow gauge track, but it was eventually converted to 4 ft 8 1/2 in (1,435 mm) standard gauge track.

The Alabama end of the line began at Pell City, where it connected with what became the Southern Railway 4 ft 8 1/2 in, and the narrow gauge Talladega and Cousa Valley Railroad. The line then passed through Broken Arrow, Alabama (which was officially renamed to Coal City around 1883 and then to Wattsville in 1929), and headed east-northeast toward the Georgia state line. Just over it, the E&W passed through Esom Hill, then Cedartown, where it connected with the Rome and Carrollton Railroad. From Cedartown, the route included Rockmart and Taylorsville before terminating at Cartersville and a connection with the Western and Atlantic Railroad.

The line that would become the East and West Railroad of Alabama actually began at the Georgia end, with the Cartersville and Van Wert Railroad, chartered in 1868 to build a 5 ft (1,524 mm) broad gauge route from Cartersville to Prior, near the Alabama state line. The entire 45-mile (72 km) route was graded and 14 miles (23 km) of track was laid to Taylorsville, Georgia before being reorganized as the Cherokee Railroad in 1870. Under the railroad's new name, more track was laid and it eventually reached Rockmart, Georgia before being sold to Cherokee Iron Company in 1879. During this same period, the track was converted from 5 ft broad gauge to 3 ft.
