= Ashley River Railroad =

Overview
- Successor: Plant System; Atlantic Coast Line Railroad; Seaboard Coast Line Railroad

Technical
- Track gauge: 4 ft 8 1/2 in (1,435 mm) standard gauge
- Previous gauge: 4 ft 9 in (1,448 mm)

The Ashley River Railroad was a shortline railroad that served the South Carolina Lowcountry region in the late 19th century.

The Ashley River Railroad was incorporated by the South Carolina General Assembly in 1875 and, according to an article in the New York Times in late December 1877, the line opened on December 27, 1877, and was the final link in the coast line of railways from New York City to Jacksonville, Florida. A new bridge over the Ashley River replaced a ferry, according to the article.

In 1901, the Ashley River Railroad was consolidated, along with the Green Pond, Walterboro and Branchville Railroad; the Abbeville Southern Railway; and Southern Alabama Railroad, into the Savannah, Florida and Western Railway (Plant System).

The Plant System was sold to the Atlantic Coast Line Railroad in 1902. The Ashley River Railroad would become part of the Atlantic Coast Line's main line (which extended in its entirety from Richmond, Virginia to Tampa, Florida).

In 1967, the Atlantic Coast Line merged with its rival, the Seaboard Air Line Railroad. The merged company was named the Seaboard Coast Line Railroad. In 1980, the Seaboard Coast Line's parent company merged with the Chessie System, creating the CSX Corporation. The CSX Corporation initially operated the Chessie and Seaboard Systems separately until 1986, when they were merged into CSX Transportation. The Ashley River Railroad is still in service and it is now part of CSX's A Line (Charleston Subdivision).

== Station Listing ==
Milepost	City/Location	Station	Connections and notes
A 388.4	North Charleston	Ashley Junction	junction with: Northeastern Railroad (ACL); South Carolina Railroad (SOU)
A 389.3	North Charleston	Bennett	
A 393.8		Drayton	
A 398.7		Johns Island	junction with Charleston and Savannah Railroad (ACL)
