= Charleston Subdivision =

Railway line in South Carolina and Georgia, U.S.

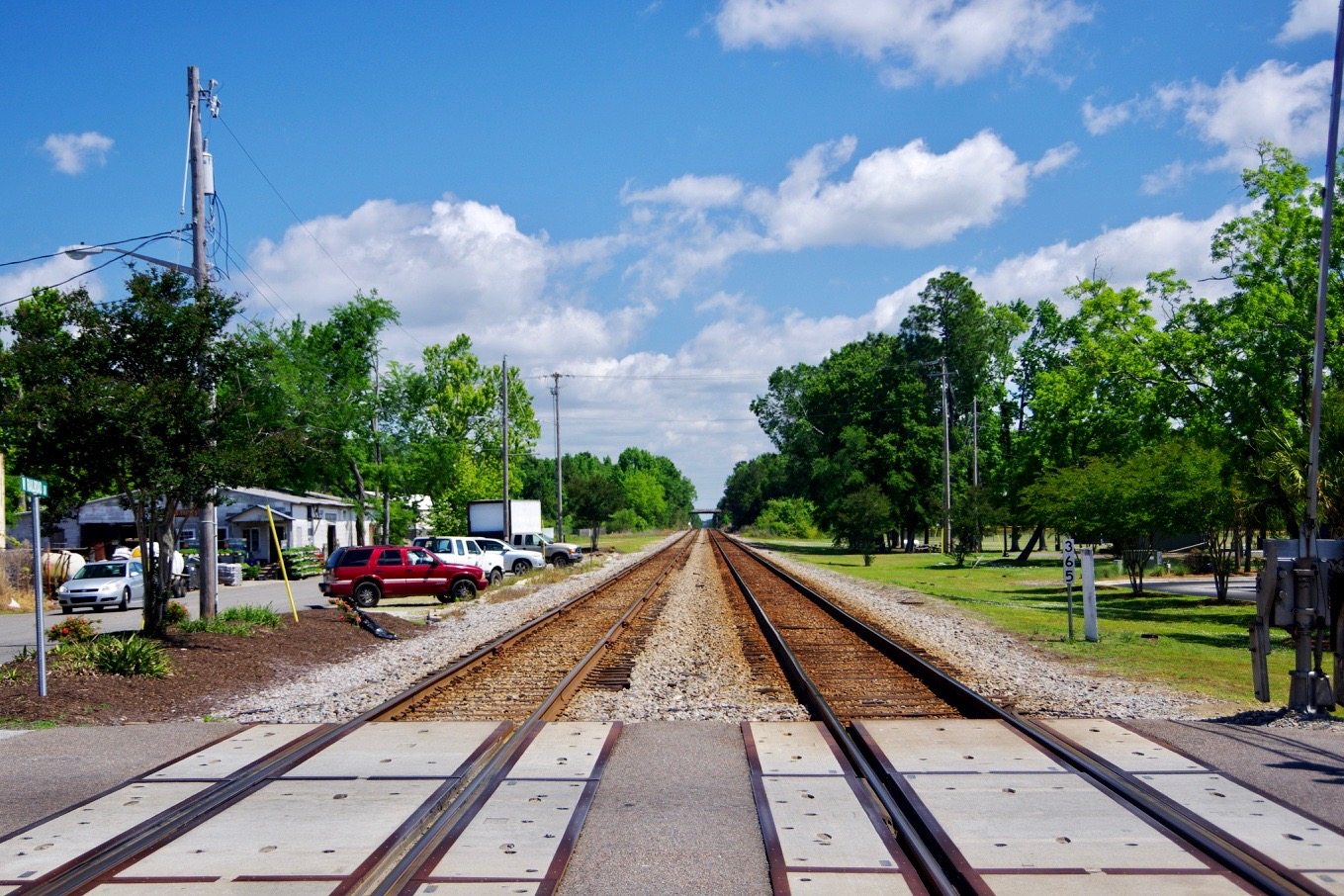
Double track segment of the line in Moncks Corner, South Carolina.

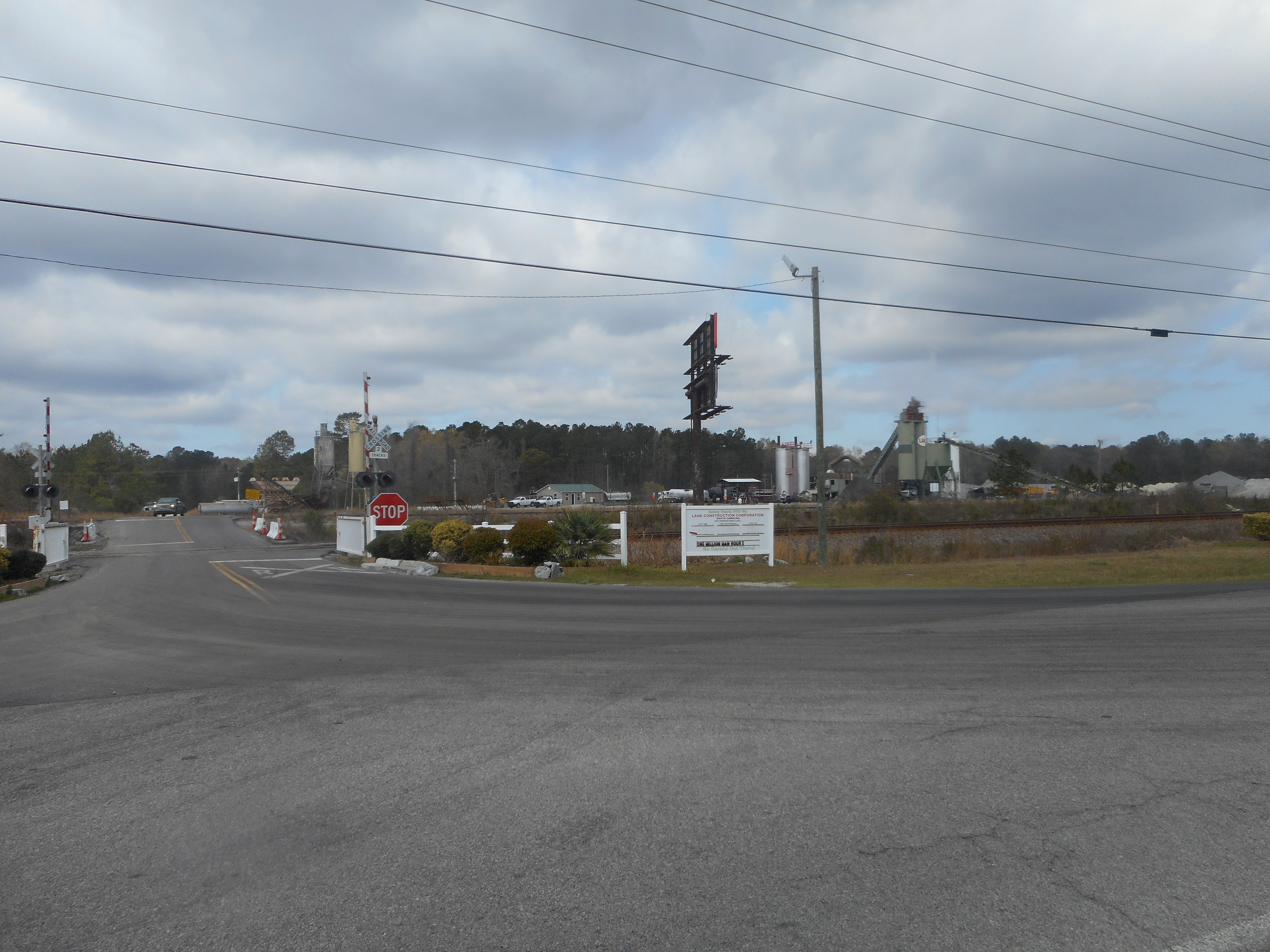
A local construction company's private railroad crossing with the Charleston Subdivision north of Ridgeland, South Carolina.

The Charleston Subdivision is a railroad territory owned by CSX Transportation in the U.S. states of South Carolina and Georgia. The line from Florence, South Carolina, to Savannah, Georgia, for a total of 195.8 miles. At its north end it continues south from the South End Subdivision and at its south end it continues south as the Savannah Subdivision of the Jacksonville Division.

The Charleston Subdivision is a portion of the Florence Division that includes part of CSX's A Line, one of their main lines which ultimately extends from Richmond, Virginia, to Tampa, Florida. Charleston Subdivision also includes a flat switching yard in North Charleston named Bennett Yard, as well as a satellite yard located in downtown Charleston called Cooper Yard which primarily holds tanks.

== History ==
The line from Florence to North Charleston was originally built as the Northeastern Railroad in 1856. The Northeastern Railroad became part of the Atlantic Coast Line Railroad in 1898.

The line south of Johns Island (just southwest of Charleston) was originally chartered in 1854 by the Charleston and Savannah Railroad (later known as the Charleston and Savannah Railway).

The line from North Charleston to Johns Island, including the bridge over the Ashley River, was built as the Ashley River Railroad, which opened in on December 27, 1877. This was the final link in what would become the Atlantic Coast Line Railroad mainline (the CSX A Line).

The Charleston and Savannah Railway and the Ashley River Railroad came under the ownership of Henry B. Plant in the 1880s. The Plant System would then be bought by the Atlantic Coast Line Railroad in 1902.

In 1967, the Atlantic Coast Line (ACL) and its competitor, the Seaboard Air Line Railroad (SAL) merged to create the Seaboard Coast Line Railroad (SCL). The first few months after the merger, the line was known as the Southover Subdivision. This was due to the fact that a nearly parallel ex-SAL route still existed just to the east from Charleston to Savannah (the East Carolina Line). This line was still designated as the Charleston Subdivision (which the SAL named it prior to the merger). Though, a few months after the merger, the ex-SAL route was severed as a through route and the SCL then used the Charleston Subdivision designation to rename the Southover Subdivision.

In 1980, the Seaboard Coast Line's parent company merged with the Chessie System, creating the CSX Corporation. The CSX Corporation initially operated the Chessie and Seaboard Systems separately until 1986, when they were merged into CSX Transportation.

== See also ==
- List of CSX Transportation lines
