= Charleston Northern Railway =

The Charleston Northern Railway was a railroad that operated in South Carolina in the early part of the 20th century.

In 1914, the Charleston Northern, South Carolina Western Railway, and South Carolina Western Extension Railway were merged into the North and South Carolina Railway. The name of the consolidated railroad company was then changed to the Carolina, Atlantic and Western Railway.

The following year, the line's name was changed to the Seaboard Air Line Railway Company.
