= McBee station =

- Seaboard Air Line Railway Depot in McBee
- U.S. National Register of Historic Places
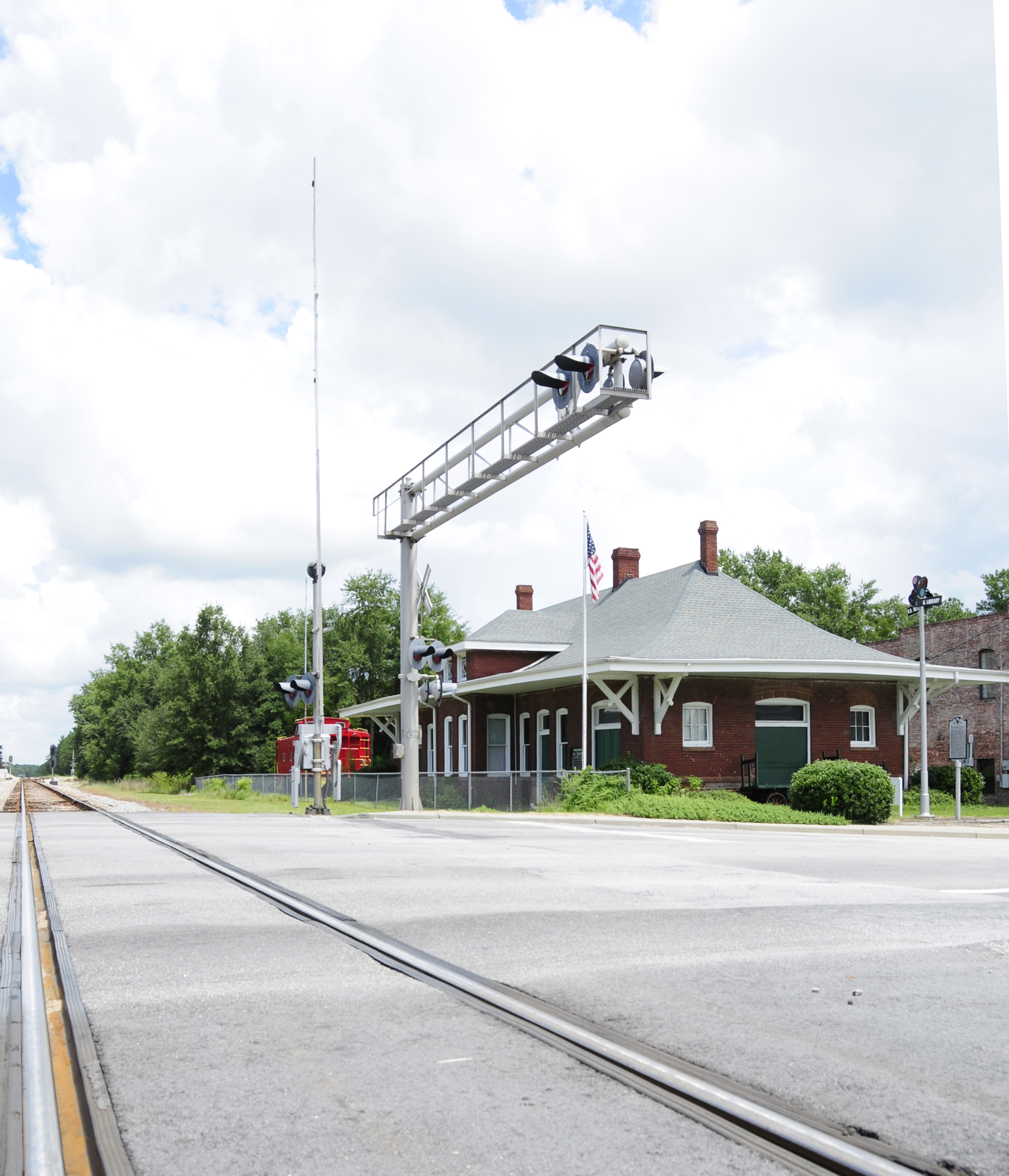
- Seaboard Air Line Railway Depot in McBee, August 2012

- Location within South Carolina Location within the United States
- Location: W. Pine Ave., NW of jct. of SC 151 and US 1, McBee, South Carolina
- Coordinates: 34°28′9″N 80°15′27″W
- Area: less than one acre
- Built: 1914
- Architect: Grundy, J.D.
- NRHP reference No.: 99000103
- Added to NRHP: September 2, 1999

Seaboard Air Line Railway Depot in McBee is a historic train station located at McBee, Chesterfield County, South Carolina. It was built in 1914, and is a one-story, red brick building in a modified rectangular plan. It has a sharply pitched hipped roof. After Seaboard discontinued passenger service in the 1960s, the McBee depot stood unused until the 1980s when the building was restored for use as the McBee Depot Library and Railroad Museum.

It was listed on the National Register of Historic Places in 1999.

Preceding station	Seaboard Air Line Railroad	Following station
Bethune toward Tampa or Miami	Main Line	Middendorf toward Richmond
Terminus	Hartsville Subdivision	Hartsville toward Poston
