= Arcadia, Gulf Coast and Lakeland Railroad =

Overview
- Dates of operation: 1891–1893
- Successor: Florida, Peninsular and Gulf Railroad

Technical
- Track gauge: 4 ft 8 1/2 in (1,435 mm) standard gauge

The Arcadia, Gulf Coast and Lakeland Railroad Company was owned by George B. Morton, Anthony Peters and Woodward Emery. It was incorporated under Florida state law chapter FOO, approved May 21, 1891, "for the purpose of constructing, maintaining and operating a railroad from a point on or near Gasparilla Island, in the county of Lee, via the town of Arcadia, in the county of DeSoto, to Plant City, in the county of Hillsborough, and to the city of Lakeland, in the county of Polk, with such extensions and branches as they may deem necessary". The railroad was promised land grants along its line. The company managed to operate a short 9-mile stretch of track between Bradenton and Sarasota.

== Amendment ==
Florida state law chapter 4259, approved May 30, 1893, extended the incorporation, due to the railroad not being able to complete its line in the time allotted, though it was already running trains on part of the route. The railroad then had two years from May 30, 1893, to complete the railroad; any sections built after then would not receive land grants. The amendment also gave them the right "to change their line of railway, so that the road will begin in Lee county, Florida, at or near the mouth of Charlotte Harbor, at or near a point known as Gasparilla Island; and that its line shall run via the town of Arcadia, in the county of DeSoto, to Plant City and Lakeland, in the counties of Hillsborough and Polk; and that the company shall have the right to build such extensions and branch lines as the board of directors shall find from time to time necessary".

== Successors ==
The Arcadia, Gulf Coast and Lakeland Railroad was taken over by the Florida, Peninsular and Gulf Railroad in 1893 but ceased operations in 1896. The Seaboard Air Line Railroad later built their line from Durant to Sarasota in 1903 using some of the former right of way.

== See also ==
- List of Florida railroads
- List of Seaboard Air Line Railroad precursors
