= Charles W. Bagnal =

United States Army general

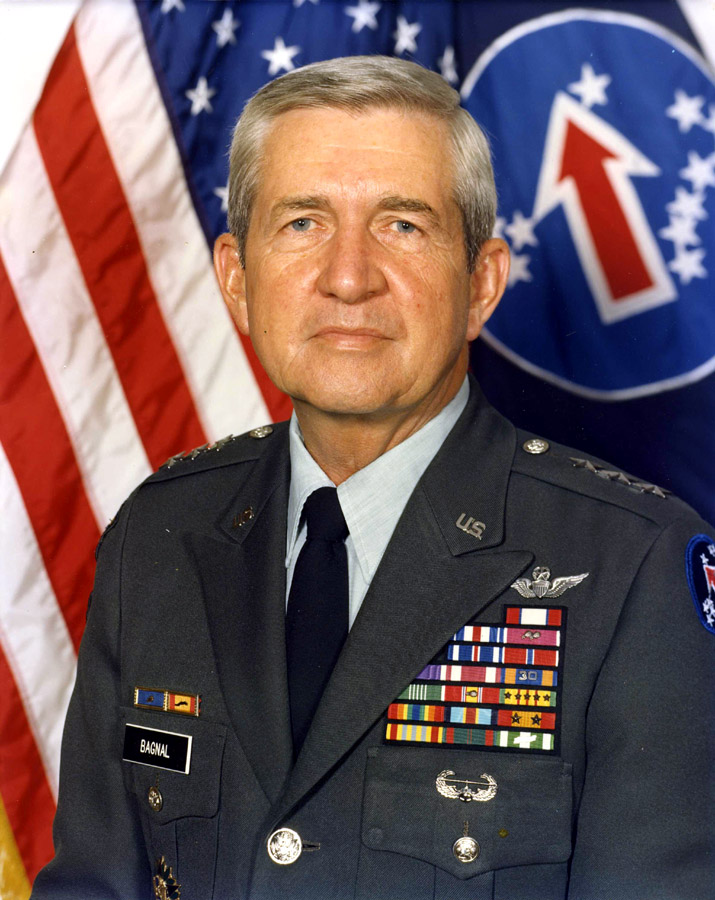
- Born: April 15, 1934; Mont Clare, South Carolina, U.S.
- Died: June 30, 2015 (aged 81); Columbia, South Carolina, U.S.
- Military career
- Allegiance: United States of America
- Branch: United States Army
- Service years: 1956–1989
- Rank: Lieutenant General
- Commands: United States Army Western Command; 101st Airborne Division
- Conflicts: Vietnam War
- Awards: Army Distinguished Service Medal; Silver Star; Legion of Merit (3); Distinguished Flying Cross; Bronze Star Medal; Purple Heart; Meritorious Service Medal; Air Medal (30)

Lieutenant General Charles Wilson Bagnal (April 15, 1934 – June 30, 2015) was a United States Army officer. He was commander of the United States Army Western Command (later United States Army Pacific), from 1985 to 1989. Previously he was Deputy Commanding General for Training of the United States Army Training and Doctrine Command (TRADOC), Deputy Superintendent at the United States Military Academy (from 1977 to 1980), Commander of the 101st Airborne Division (1981-1983), Commander of the Officer Personnel Management Directorate for the United States Army Military Personnel Center, and Special Assistant to the Deputy Chief of Staff for Personnel. He is an alumnus of the United States Military Academy, United States Army Command & General Staff College, Georgia Tech, the United States Army War College and McLenaghan High School in Florence, South Carolina (class of 1952). He retired August 31, 1989, and later obtained his juris doctor from the University of South Carolina and practiced law. He resided in Columbia with his wife Patsy. Bagnal died on June 30, 2015, after a battle with leukemia. He was interred at the U.S. Military Academy Cemetery on July 14, 2015.

== Awards and decorations ==
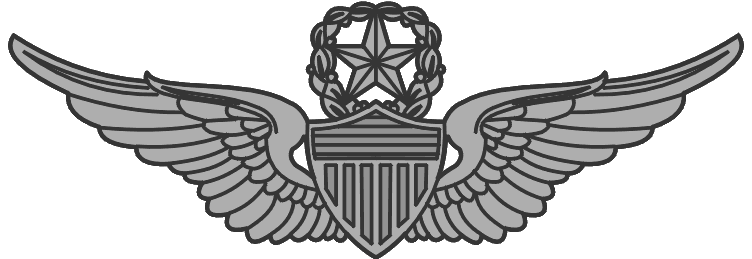
