= Durham and Northern Railway =

Historic railroad in North Carolina

Overview
- Locale: North Carolina
- Dates of operation: 1887–1901
- Successor: Seaboard Air Line Railroad; Seaboard Coast Line Railroad

Technical
- Track gauge: 4 ft 8 1/2 in (1,435 mm) standard gauge

The Durham and Northern Railway was a railroad that historically ran from Henderson, North Carolina to Durham, North Carolina. The line became part of the Seaboard Air Line Railroad and operated as the company's Durham Subdivision and it also had a short branch from Dickerson to Oxford.

== History ==
The Durham and Northern Railway was first organized as the Durham & Northern Railway Company on August 29, 1887, by the State of State of North Carolina. The line came under the ownership of the Raleigh and Gaston Railroad, which the Durham and Northern Railway connected with in Henderson. The cities of Henderson and Durham jointly financed the construction of the line.

The Raleigh and Gaston Railroad was absorbed into the Seaboard Air Line Railway in 1900, and the Durham and Northern was fully merged into the company in 1901. The Seaboard designated the line as their Durham Subdivision and in 1902, they built a short 4-mile branch from Dickerson to Oxford.

The line was used for passenger service in its early days, but by 1955, it was freight only with one local freight train running six days a week.

In 1967, the SAL merged with its rival, the Atlantic Coast Line Railroad (ACL). The merged company was named the Seaboard Coast Line Railroad (SCL). The Seaboard Coast Line continued to operate the Durham Subdivision but it was subsequently abandoned by 1975.

== Historic stations ==
Milepost	City/Location	Station	Connections and notes
SB 113.8	Henderson	Henderson	junction with Main Line
SB 124.1		Dickerson	
SBA 128.5	Oxford	Oxford	located on Oxford Spur
SB 130.8		Tar River	
SB 138.1	Creedmoor	Creedmoor	
SB 142.6		North Side	
SB 155.4	Durham	Durham	junction with: Lynchburg and Durham Railroad (N&W); Durham & South Carolina Railroad (N&W); North Carolina Railroad (SOU)
