= Henderson station =

- Henderson Louisville and Nashville Railroad Depot
- U.S. National Register of Historic Places
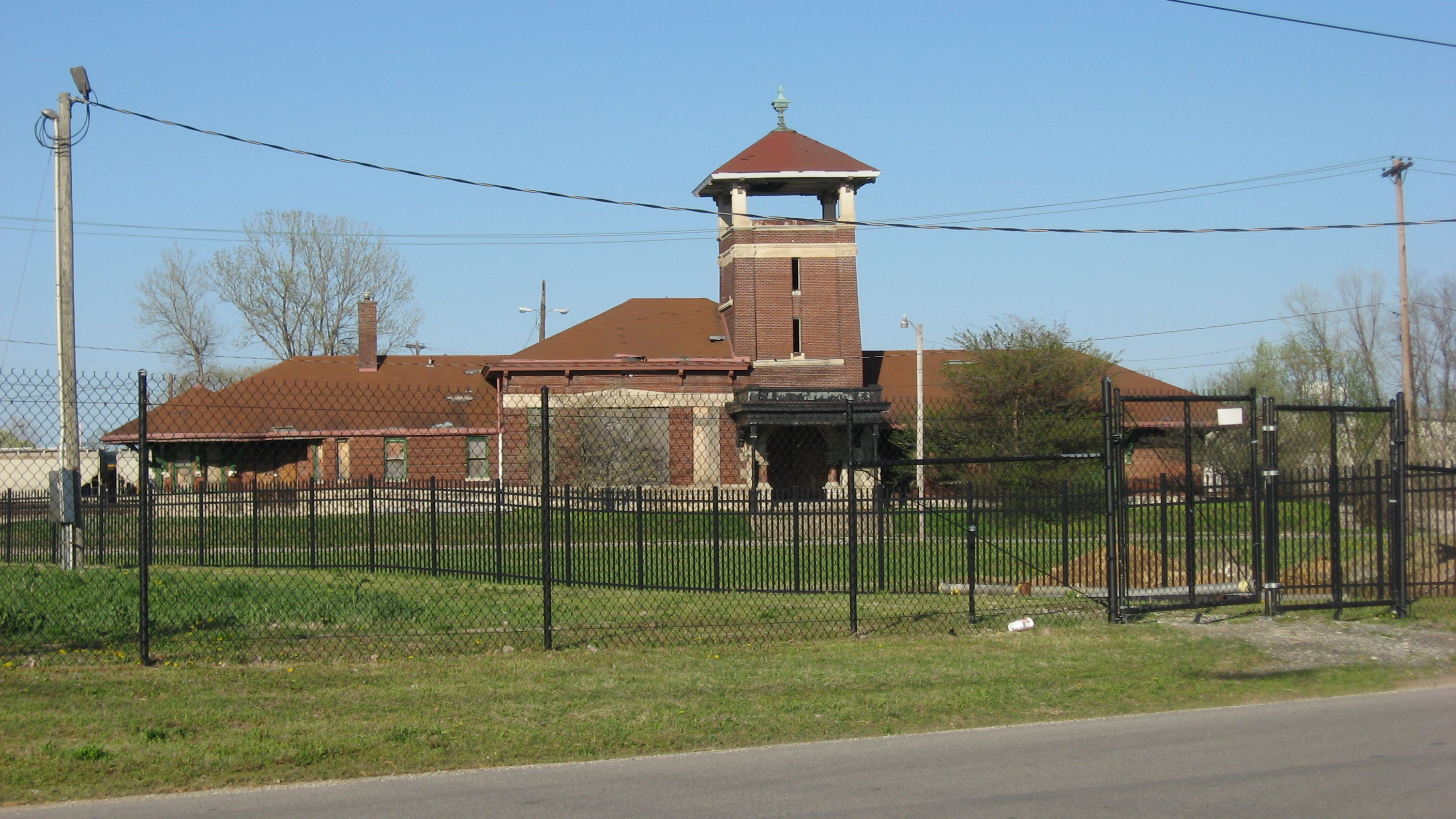
- Location: 300 Clark St. Henderson, Kentucky
- Coordinates: 37°50′12″N 87°34′39″W
- NRHP reference No.: 80001549
- Added to NRHP: May 14, 1980

The Henderson Louisville and Nashville Railroad Depot is a former railway station in Henderson, Kentucky. The station building was opened on July 1, 1901. The station building was financed by the Louisville and Nashville Railroad on land owned by the Illinois Central Railroad, and consolidated operations of those roads as well as the regional Louisville, St. Louis and Texas Railroad. Passenger rail service ended on April 30, 1971. It was listed on the National Register of Historic Places on May 14, 1980. In 2022, Railmark Holdings announced they would move their corporate offices into the renovated building.

Preceding station	Louisville and Nashville Railroad	Following station
Vaughan toward St. Louis	St. Louis – Nashville	Lowland toward Nashville
Vaughan toward St. Louis	St. Louis – Louisville	Baskett toward Louisville
