= Raleigh and Gaston Railroad =

Railway in North Carolina

- Raleigh to Weldon route (click to enlarge)

Overview
- Locale: North Carolina
- Successor: Seaboard Air Line Railroad; Seaboard Coast Line Railroad; CSX Transportation

Technical
- Track gauge: 4 ft 8 1/2 in (1,435 mm) standard gauge
- Previous gauge: 4 ft 8 in (1,422 mm)

The Raleigh and Gaston Railroad was a Raleigh, North Carolina, based railroad opened in April 1840 between Raleigh and the town of Gaston, North Carolina, on the Roanoke River. It was North Carolina's second railroad (the Wilmington and Weldon Railroad opened one month earlier). The length was 100 miles (160 km) and built with 4 ft 8 in (1,422 mm) gauge. Part of the Raleigh and Gaston's tracks remains in service today as part of CSX's S Line as the Norlina Subdivision of CSX's Florence Division.

== History ==
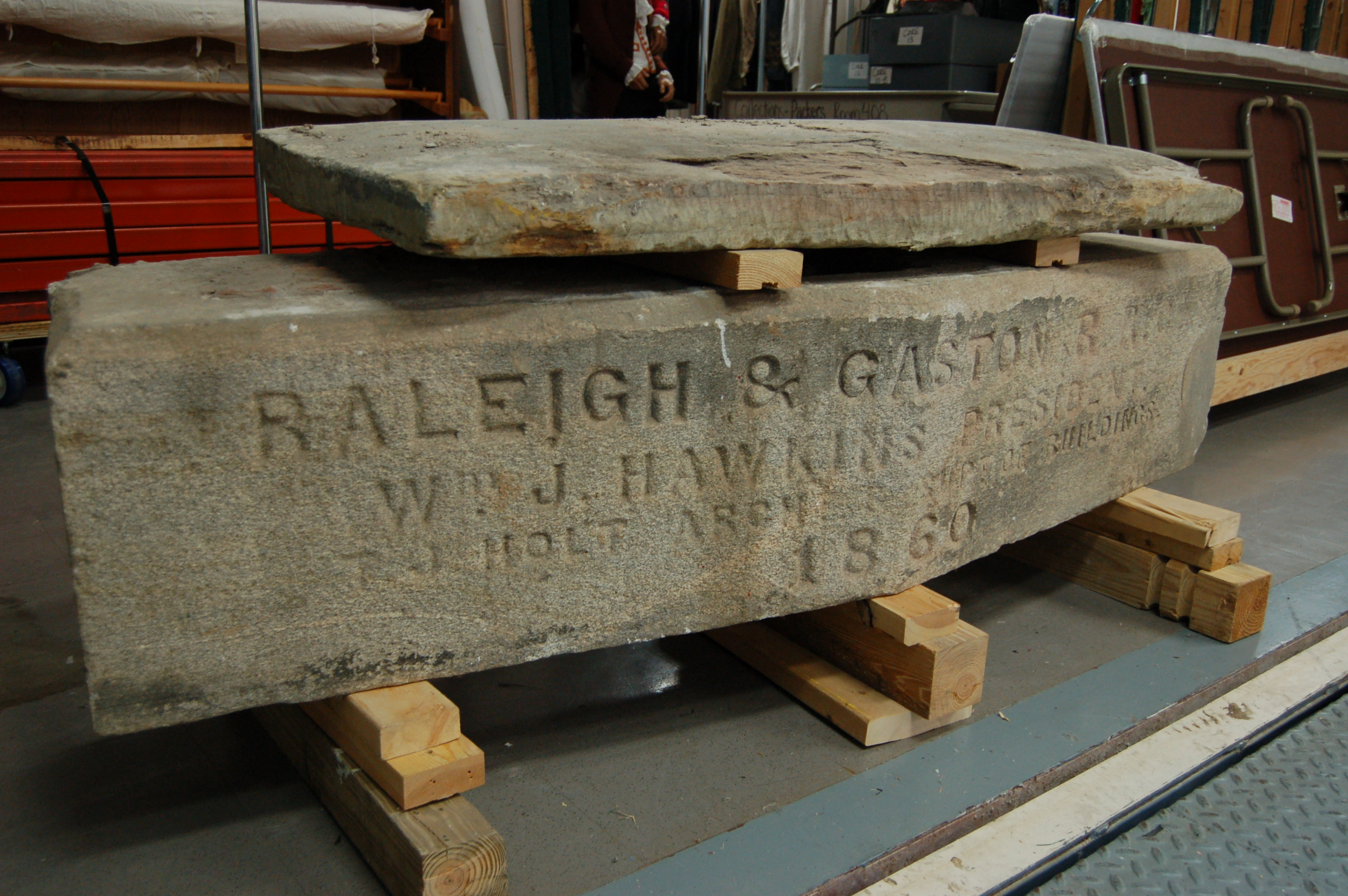
Cornerstone of the Raleigh and Gaston railroad building of Raleigh, North Carolina

Construction on the line began in 1836. At the north end, the line initially crossed the Roanoke River near Roanoke Rapids on a 1,040-foot long bridge to connect the line to Gaston. In Gaston, it connected with the Greensville and Roanoke Railroad (which was operated by the Petersburg Railroad). In 1852, the line was extended from Roanoke Rapids east to Weldon.

The Raleigh and Gaston Railroad served the Confederacy during the American Civil War. Its track provided a link in a route that provided the most direct route from Richmond, Virginia and Raleigh at the time. During the fall of Richmond, the original bridge over the Roanoke River at Gaston was destroyed and was never rebuilt. After the war, the line was reconnected to the north side of the river when the Seaboard and Roanoke Railroad rebuilt their bridge over the Roanoke River at Weldon.

The railroad built the Franklinton Depot in 1886. It was listed on the National Register of Historic Places in 1990.

The Raleigh and Gaston Railroad merged with the Seaboard Air Line Railroad (SAL) in 1900. At the same time, SAL finished a line running from Norlina north to Richmond, Virginia (which was chartered by the Richmond, Petersburg and Carolina Railroad). This line, along with the former Raleigh and Gaston Railroad from Norlina south became the SAL's main line. The line from Norlina to Weldon became part of SAL's Portsmouth Subdivision.

In 1967, the SAL merged with its rival, the Atlantic Coast Line Railroad (ACL). The merged company was named the Seaboard Coast Line Railroad (SCL). After the merger, the ex-SAL main line became known as the S Line in the combined network. Track from Norlina to Weldon was then known as the Roanoke Rapid Subdivision, which has since been abandoned.

In 1980, the Seaboard Coast Line's parent company merged with the Chessie System, creating the CSX Corporation. The CSX Corporation initially operated the Chessie and Seaboard Systems separately until 1986, when they were merged into CSX Transportation. CSX abandoned the S Line (the designation for the former Seaboard Air Line main line) north of Norlina into Virginia in 1985.

== Current conditions ==
Today, much of the Raleigh and Gaston Railroad remains in service. Track from Raleigh to Norlina is now CSX's Norlina Subdivision. Track from Norlina to Roanoke Rapids was abandoned in 1983, but the short segment from Weldon to Roanoke Rapids is still in service as CSX's Roanoke Rapids Spur (which connects to CSX's A Line).

== Historic stations ==
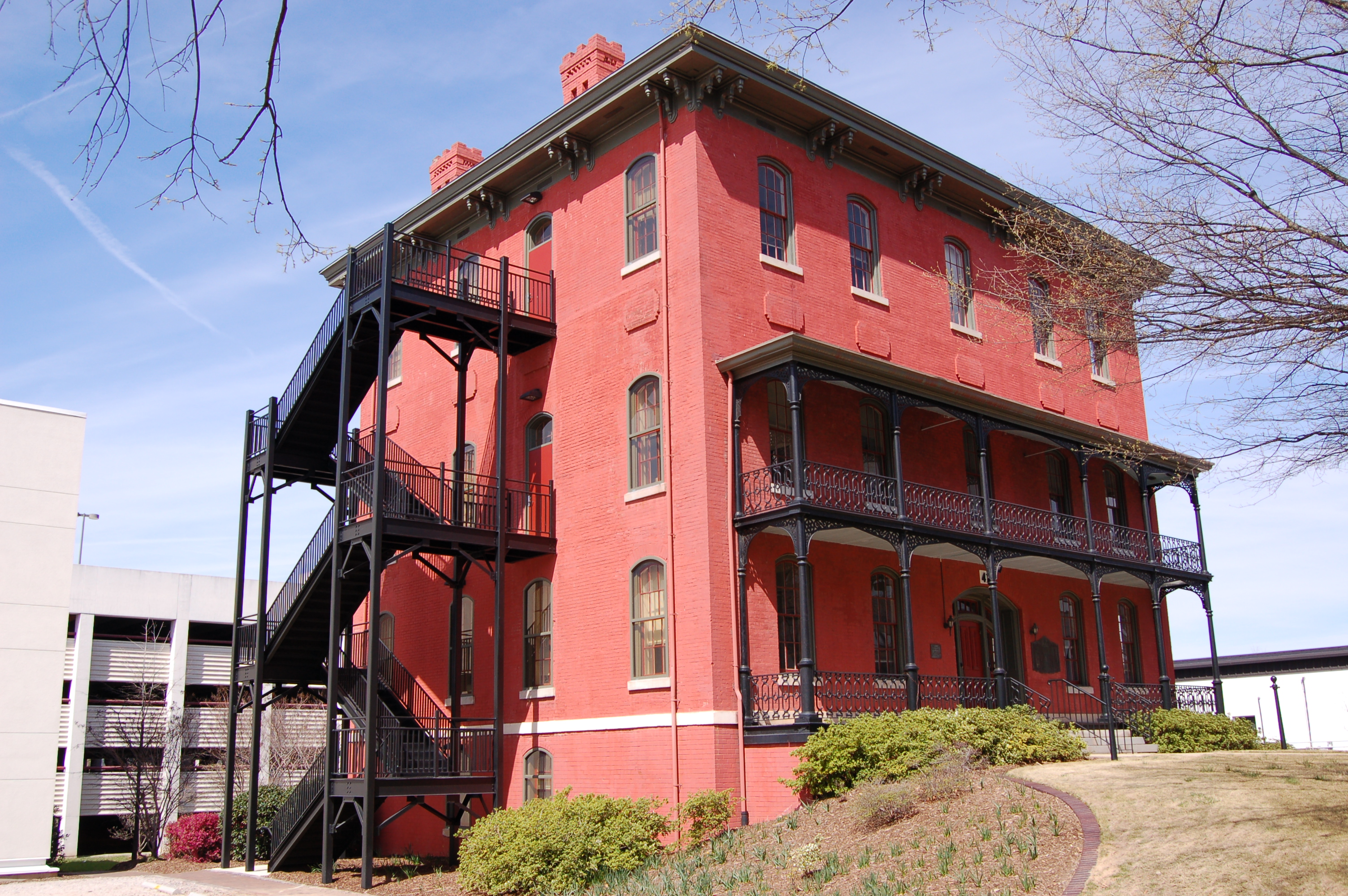
Raleigh and Gaston / Seaboard Coast Line Building, which was once home to the Raleigh and Gaston Railroad.

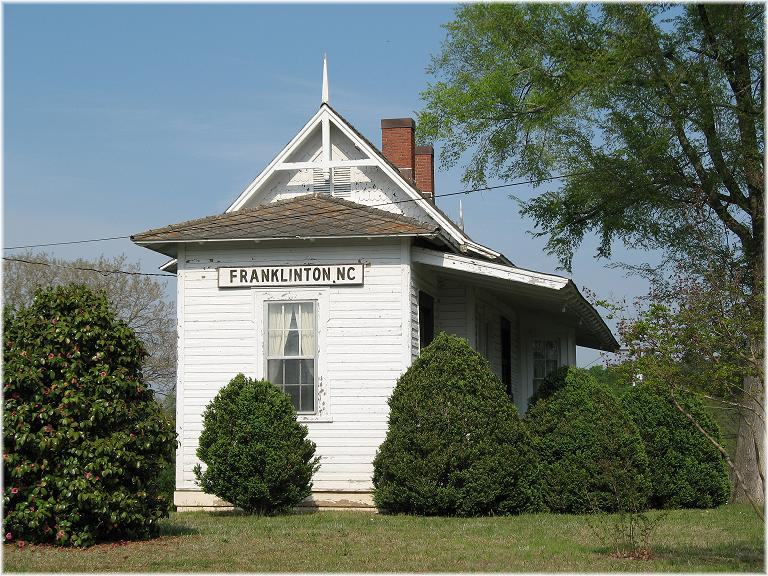
Raleigh and Gaston Railroad's Franklinton Depot

Milepost	City/Location	Station	Connections and notes
SA 78.8	Weldon	Weldon	located on branch track built in 1853 junction with: Seaboard and Roanoke Railroad (SAL); Wilmington and Weldon Railroad (ACL); Petersburg Railroad (ACL)
SA 82.7	Roanoke Rapids	Roanoke Junction	
	Gaston	Gaston	located on original route that was severed during the American Civil War
SA 84.9		Bolling	
SA 91.2		Thelma	
SA 92.7		Summit	
SA 98.3	Littleton	Littleton	
SA 104.0	Vaughan	Vaughan	
SA 109.0	Macon	Macon	
SA 113.3		Warren Plains	
SA 115.3; S 98.4 (Note: Milepost numbers from Weldon to Norlina continue from the Seaboard and Roanoke Railroad. Mileposts from Norlina to Raleigh continue from the Richmond, Petersburg and Carolina Railroad.)	Norlina	Norlina	originally Ridgeway Junction junction with Richmond, Petersburg and Carolina Railroad (SAL)
S 100.6	Ridgeway	Ridgeway	
S 103.4	Manson	Manson	
S 106.5	Middleburg	Middleburg	
		Brookston	
S 109.8		Greystone	
S 113.8	Henderson	Henderson	junction with: Durham and Northern Railway (SAL); Oxford & Henderson Railroad (SOU)
S 118.3		Gill	
		Staunton	
S 121.8	Kittrell	Kittrell	
S 130.3	Franklinton	Franklinton	junction with Louisburg Railroad
S 136.5	Youngsville	Youngsville	
S 140.5	Wake Forest	Wake Forest	
S 141.5	Wake Forest	Forestville	
S 143.7		Wyatt	
S 147.1	Neuse	Neuse	
S 150.8	Raleigh	Millbrook	
S 154.8	Raleigh	Edgeton	
S 156.1	Raleigh	Raleigh	junction with: Raleigh and Augusta Air Line Railroad (SAL); Raleigh, Charlotte and Southern Railway (SOU); Norfolk Southern Railway (SOU)

== See also ==
- Raleigh and Gaston / Seaboard Coast Line Building
- List of defunct North Carolina railroads
