= Pee Dee River Railway =

The Pee Dee River Railway is a South Carolina railroad that serves the far eastern portion of the state.

The Aberdeen and Rockfish Railroad established the Pee Dee River Railway between McColl, South Carolina, and Bennettsville, South Carolina, in 1987.

The line operated by the Pee Dee River Railway was begun in 1884 by the South Carolina Pacific Railway, a South Carolina railroad chartered in 1882.

It was leased to the Cape Fear and Yadkin Valley Railway Company beginning in 1884.

The Cape Fear and Yadkin Valley was placed in receivership in 1894 and for several decades ownership of the carrier changed hands repeatedly, until a North Carolina Supreme Court decision in 1924. The southern routes of the Cape Fear and Yadkin Valley, including the South Carolina Pacific, went to the Atlantic Coast Line Railroad.

The lease for the South Carolina Pacific passed to the Atlantic Coast Line. The company was merged into the Seaboard System in 1983, with the South Carolina Pacific being officially dissolved.

Marlboro County, South Carolina, purchased the line following abandonment by CSX in 1987 and leased the operation to the Pee Dee River Railway.

The line formerly operated seven days a week, serving several major industrial operations, including the Domtar paper mill, two Flakeboard mills, Mohawk Carpet, Hanson Aggregates and Southern States, a feed and fertilizer producer.

As of 2017 the Pee Dee River Railway only operates 5 days a week and one trip per day, as they lost Hanson Aggregates, Southern States and Mohawk Carpet as customers. The remaining major customers are the Domtar Paper Mill/Tatum distribution center and the flakeboard plant.
