= Mont Clare, South Carolina =

- Unincorporated community
- Location within South Carolina Location within the United States
- Coordinates: 34°23′49″N 79°49′16″W
- Country: United States
- State: South Carolina
- County: Darlington
- Elevation: 174 ft (53 m)
- Time zone: UTC-5 (Eastern (EST))
  - Summer (DST): UTC-4 (EDT)
- Area codes: 843, 854
- GNIS feature ID: 1246713

Mont Clare (also Monte Clare, Montclare) is an unincorporated community in Darlington County, South Carolina, United States.

== Notable person ==
- Charles W. Bagnal, United States army officer and lawyer, was born in Mont Clare.
