= Charleston Union Station Company =

American railroad company

The Charleston Union Station Company was a railroad company based in Charleston, South Carolina, that operated throughout much of the 20th century.

The Charleston Union Station Company was chartered by the South Carolina General Assembly in 1902 to acquire and operate terminal facilities in Charleston. Construction was begun in 1905 and the company was open for operation in November 1907.

The Charleston Union Station Company owned and operated a passenger station in Charleston. It also owned and used nearly one-third of a mile of track and a little more than two miles of yard tracks and sidings.

The Charleston Union Station Company was controlled by the Atlantic Coast Line Railroad and the Southern Railway.

The station was on the corner of East Bay and Columbus Streets and burned in early 1947. Some time later the site area was sold to the South Carolina State Ports Authority, which continues to use it.

The company continued for many years after the loss of the station.
