= Louisburg Railroad =

Historic railroad in North Carolina

Overview
- Locale: North Carolina
- Dates of operation: 1884–1900
- Successor: Seaboard Air Line Railroad; Seaboard Coast Line Railroad

Technical
- Track gauge: 4 ft 8 1/2 in (1,435 mm) standard gauge

The Louisburg Railroad was a railroad that historically ran from Franklinton, North Carolina to Louisburg, North Carolina. The line became part of the Seaboard Air Line Railroad and operated as the company's Louisburg Subdivision.

== History ==
The Louisburg Railroad was first chartered in 1881 and construction began in 1884 and it was completed in 1885. The Louisburg Railroad was subsequently leased to the Raleigh and Gaston Railroad, which the Louisburg Railroad connected with in Franklinton. The Louisburg Railroad retained its name under the lease and the Raleigh and Gaston Railroad operated it as a branch line.

The Raleigh and Gaston Railroad was absorbed into the Seaboard Air Line Railway in 1900, and the Louisburg Railroad was fully merged into the company as well. The Seaboard designated the line as their Louisburg Subdivision. By 1955, a local daily freight train was running the line six days a week.

In 1967, the Seaboard Air Line merged with its rival, the Atlantic Coast Line Railroad (ACL). The merged company was named the Seaboard Coast Line Railroad (SCL). The Seaboard Coast Line operated the Louisburg Subdivision from 1967 to 1982. The Louisburg Branch was operated as a part of the Seaboard System Railroad's Norlina Subdivision from 1982 to 1985. In 1985 the Seaboard System Railroad sold the line to shortline railroad operator Laurinburg and Southern, which operated the branch as the Franklin County Railroad from 1985 until the lines abandonment in 1989. Some of the right of way in Louisburg has since become the Louisburg Bike Trail.

== Historic stations ==
Milepost	City/Location	Station	Connections and notes
SC 130.3	Franklinton	Franklinton	junction with Seaboard Air Line Railroad Main Line
SC 135.0		Mitchener	
SC 135.8		Katesville	
SC 139.8	Louisburg	Louisburg	
