= Cherokee Railroad =

Historic railroad in Georgia, United States

Overview
- Locale: Georgia

Technical
- Track gauge: 3 ft (914 mm)
- Previous gauge: 5 ft (1,524 mm)

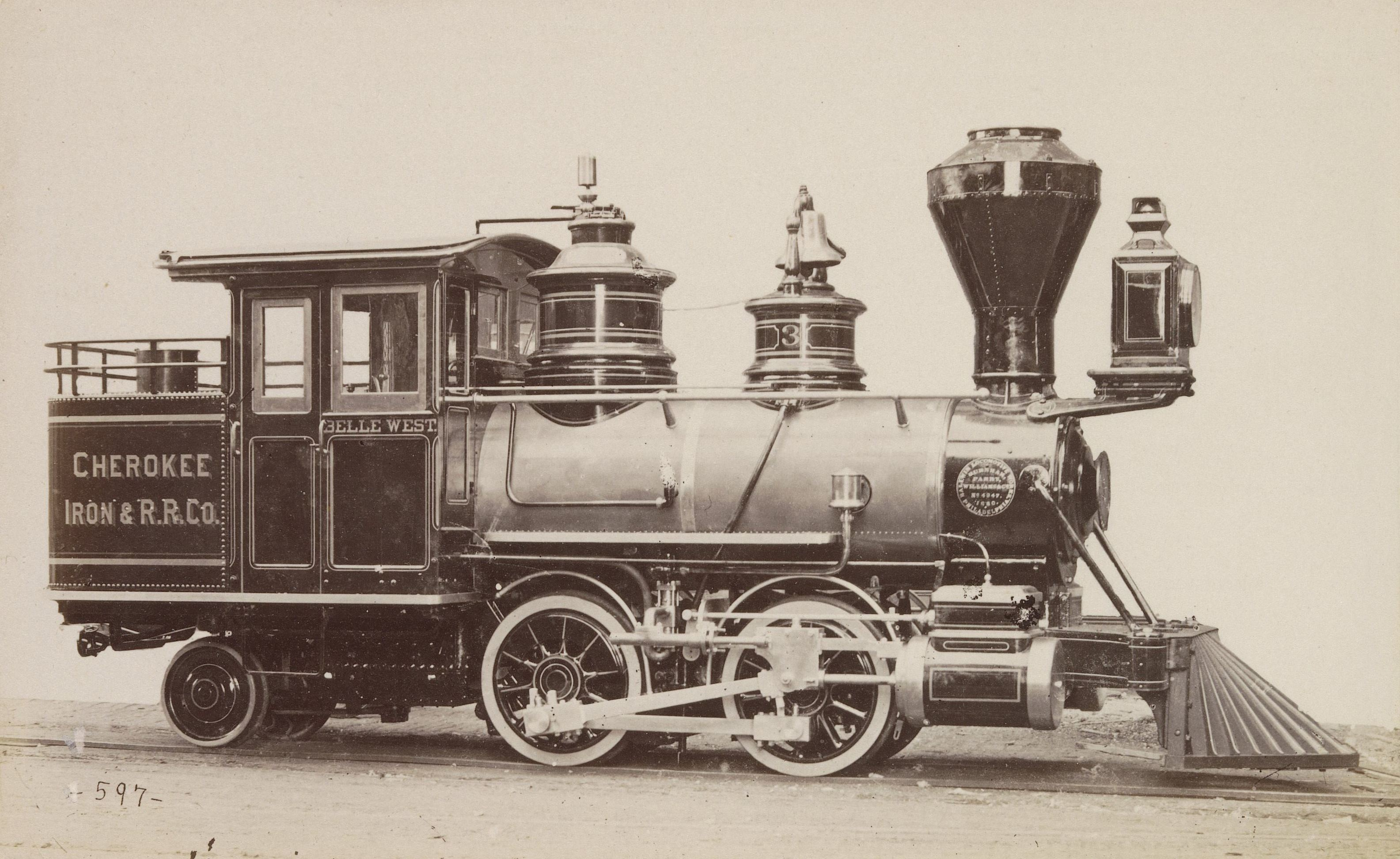
Forney locomotive Belle West

The Cherokee Railroad is an historic railroad that operated in the U.S. state of Georgia.

It was organized in 1870 to take over operations from the failing Cartersville and Van Wert Railroad. The Cherokee Railroad initially operated from Cartersville to Taylorsville, and the new owners extended the railroad to Rockmart, Georgia. The new owners also converted the track from 5 ft (1,524 mm) broad gauge to 3 ft (914 mm) narrow gauge. Unfortunately, the financial problems for the line continued and it was eventually sold to the Cherokee Iron Company in 1879. The Cherokee Iron Company then leased the Cherokee Railroad's lines to the East and West Railroad of Alabama who, in 1886, purchased the line outright and then merged it into its own operations.
