= Charlotte, Monroe and Columbia Railroad =

Shortline railroad serving South Carolina

The Charlotte, Monroe and Columbia Railroad was a shortline railroad that served South Carolina in the early 20th century. The line ran between McBee, South Carolina, and Jefferson, South Carolina. The company was incorporated in 1901 and construction was completed in 1903.

The company was reorganized in both 1908 and 1909. Long controlled by the Seaboard Air Line Railroad, the Charlotte, Monroe and Columbia got rid of its last locomotive in 1930 and used Seaboard locomotives afterward. It eventually became part of the Seaboard Air Line Railroad and the line was abandoned in 1940.
