= South Carolina Western Extension Railway =

The South Carolina Western Extension Railway was a South Carolina railroad that was begun in the early part of the 20th century.

The South Carolina Western Extension Railway was chartered by the South Carolina General Assembly in 1913. It was in the process of building a line from Andrews, South Carolina, to Charleston, South Carolina, when it, along with the South Carolina Western Railway, and the Charleston Northern Railway were merged into the North and South Carolina Railway to form the Carolina, Atlantic and Western Railway in 1914.
