= Breeden, South Carolina =

Settlement in South Carolina, United States

Coordinates: 34°39′12″N 79°39′33″W

Breeden is an unincorporated community in Marlboro County, in the U.S. state of South Carolina.

== History ==
The community was named after the Breeden family which owned several large farms in the area. Variant names are "Breeden Siding" and "Breedens".
