= Bellwood, Virginia =

- CDP
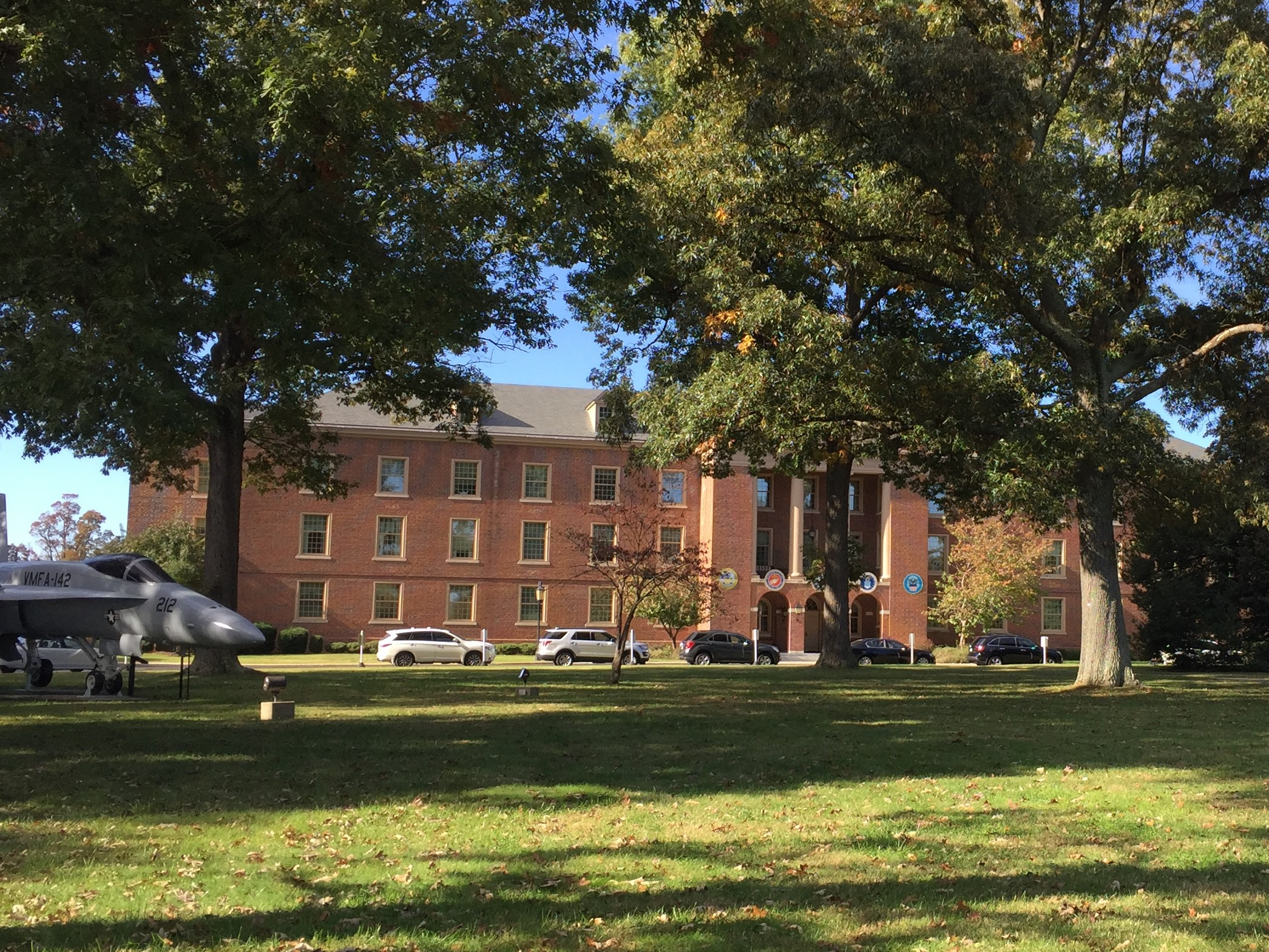
- The Defense Supply Center, Richmond is located in Bellwood

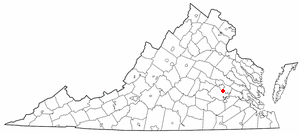
- Location of Bellwood, Virginia
- Coordinates: 37°24′20″N 77°26′3″W
- Country: United States
- State: Virginia
- County: Chesterfield

Area
  - Total: 5.8 sq mi (15.0 km^{2})
  - Land: 5.8 sq mi (15.0 km^{2})
  - Water: 0 sq mi (0.0 km^{2})
- Elevation: 95 ft (29 m)

Population (2010)
  - Total: 6,352
  - Density: 1,100/sq mi (423/km^{2})
- Time zone: UTC−5 (Eastern (EST))
  - Summer (DST): UTC−4 (EDT)
- FIPS code: 51-06216
- GNIS feature ID: 1492547

Bellwood is a census-designated place (CDP) in Chesterfield County, Virginia, United States. As of the 2020 census, Bellwood had a population of 7,678. The community takes its name from Bellwood, one of the James River Plantations.

== Geography ==
Bellwood is located at 37°24′20″N 77°26′3″W (37.405598, -77.434205).

According to the United States Census Bureau, the CDP has a total area of 5.8 square miles (15.0 km^{2}), all land.

== Demographics ==
Historical population
Census	Pop.	Note	%±
2000	5,974		—
2010	6,352		6.3%
2020	7,678		20.9%
U.S. Decennial Census; 2010 2020

=== Racial and ethnic composition ===
Bellwood CDP, Virginia – Racial and ethnic composition Note: the US Census treats Hispanic/Latino as an ethnic category. This table excludes Latinos from the racial categories and assigns them to a separate category. Hispanics/Latinos may be of any race.
Race / Ethnicity (NH = Non-Hispanic)	Pop 2000	Pop 2010	Pop 2020	% 2000	% 2010	% 2020
White alone (NH)	4,001	3,199	2,750	66.97%	50.36%	35.82%
Black or African American alone (NH)	1,206	1,634	2,173	20.19%	25.72%	28.30%
Native American or Alaska Native alone (NH)	38	38	30	0.64%	0.60%	0.39%
Asian alone (NH)	152	153	206	2.54%	2.41%	2.68%
Native Hawaiian or Pacific Islander alone (NH)	2	6	2	0.03%	0.09%	0.03%
Other race alone (NH)	7	14	43	0.12%	0.22%	0.56%
Mixed race or Multiracial (NH)	119	128	285	1.99%	2.02%	3.71%
Hispanic or Latino (any race)	449	1,180	2,189	7.52%	18.58%	28.51%
Total	5,974	6,352	7,678	100.00%	100.00%	100.00%

=== 2000 census ===
As of the census of 2000, there were 5,974 people, 2,323 households, and 1,598 families residing in the CDP. The population density was 1,005.0 people per square mile (388.3/km^{2}). There were 2,448 housing units at an average density of 411.8/sq mi (159.1/km^{2}). The racial makeup of the CDP was 69.17% White, 20.32% African American, 0.80% Native American, 2.56% Asian, 0.03% Pacific Islander, 4.35% from other races, and 2.76% from two or more races. Hispanic or Latino of any race were 7.52% of the population.

There were 2,323 households, out of which 36.1% had children under the age of 18 living with them, 43.7% were married couples living together, 18.1% had a female householder with no husband present, and 31.2% were non-families. 25.2% of all households were made up of individuals, and 7.7% had someone living alone who was 65 years of age or older. The average household size was 2.57 and the average family size was 3.05.

In the CDP, the population was spread out, with 28.4% under the age of 18, 8.6% from 18 to 24, 31.9% from 25 to 44, 21.9% from 45 to 64, and 9.2% who were 65 years of age or older. The median age was 34 years. For every 100 females, there were 98.4 males. For every 100 females age 18 and over, there were 95.8 males.

The median income for a household in the CDP was $34,433, and the median income for a family was $39,632. Males had a median income of $28,144 versus $25,000 for females. The per capita income for the CDP was $16,764. About 13.6% of families and 16.8% of the population were below the poverty line, including 30.0% of those under age 18 and 9.5% of those age 65 or over.
