= Chester, Greenwood and Abbeville Railroad =

Late 19th century railroad company in the southern United States

The Chester, Greenwood and Abbeville Railroad was a South Carolina railroad company chartered in the late 19th century.

The Chester, Greenwood and Abbeville Railroad was Chartered by the South Carolina General Assembly in 1885.

A year later, the company's name was changed to the Georgia, Carolina and Northern Railway. The goal was to construct a line from Monroe, North Carolina, to Atlanta, Georgia. Construction on the line began in 1887 in North Carolina.

In 1901 the line was formally merged into the Seaboard Air Line Railway.
