= Charleston Southern Railway =

The Charleston Southern Railway was a South Carolina railroad established in the early part of the 20th century.

The Charleston Southern Railway, incorporated by the South Carolina General Assembly in 1915, was to be an extension of the Seaboard Air Line Railroad, with an 85-mile route from Charleston, South Carolina, to Savannah, Georgia, planned.

The Charleston Southern merged with the Carolina, Atlantic and Western Railway in September 1915.

Two months later, the Carolina, Atlantic and Western changed its name to the Seaboard Air Line Railroad.
