= Cartersville and Van Wert Railroad =

Overview
- Headquarters: Cartersville, Georgia
- Locale: Georgia

Technical
- Track gauge: 5 ft (1,524 mm)

The Cartersville and Van Wert Railroad was originally planned to connect the Western & Atlantic Railroad at Cartersville, Georgia, to the Selma, Rome and Dalton Railroad at Prior, Georgia, almost on the Alabama state line. It was chartered in 1866, then incorporated on December 13, and was intended to be a local feeder line for the Western and Atlantic Railroad. The railroad was planned to serve the rich marble and slate quarries and other mineral extraction companies along its route.

Although material aid was pledged by Col. E. Hulbert of the Western and Atlantic Railroad, construction delays and disputes over the railroad's proposed right of way led to speculation on the railroad's feasibility. By 1870 the railroad had 14 miles (23 km) of 5 ft (1,524 mm) broad gauge track connecting Cartersville to Taylorsville, Georgia, but further growth was apparently impeded by shady financial dealings by then Governor Rufus Bullock, Hanniball Kimball, and other associates, so much so that the railroad company's ownership was called into question. These problems caused the railroad to be reorganized as the Cherokee Railroad.

Governor Bullock's involvement in the bonds issued for the C&VW led to the introduction of an amendment to the Constitution of Georgia in 1877 during Governor Colquitt's term that would prohibit payment on "bogus bonds" as they came to be known.
