= McColl, South Carolina =

- Town
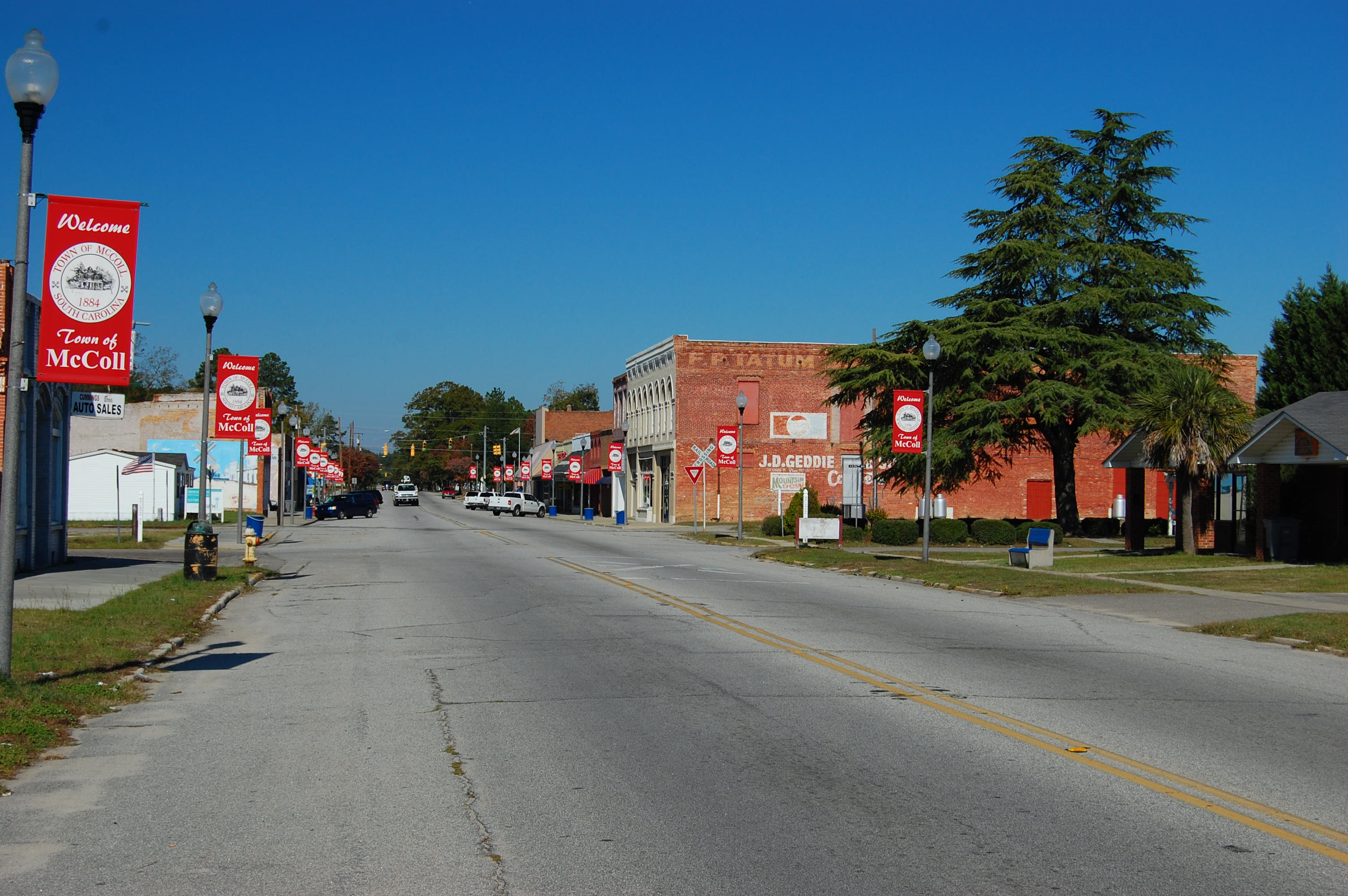
- Downtown McColl

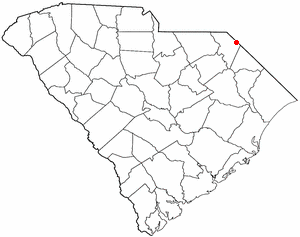
- Location of McColl in South Carolina
- Coordinates: 34°39′59″N 79°32′41″W
- Country: United States
- State: South Carolina
- County: Marlboro
- Founded: 1884

Area
  - Total: 1.05 sq mi (2.72 km^{2})
  - Land: 1.05 sq mi (2.72 km^{2})
  - Water: 0 sq mi (0.00 km^{2})
- Elevation: 184 ft (56 m)

Population (2020)
  - Total: 2,070
  - Density: 1,971.4/sq mi (761.16/km^{2})
- Time zone: UTC-5 (Eastern (EST))
  - Summer (DST): UTC-4 (EDT)
- ZIP code: 29570
- Area codes: 843, 854
- FIPS code: 45-43630
- GNIS feature ID: 2406124
- Website: Official website

McColl is a town in Marlboro County, South Carolina, United States. It lies in the state's Pee Dee region, 8 miles (13 km) from the North Carolina border. The population was 2,174 at the 2010 census.

McColl is the home of the Pee Dee Indian Tribe. They are a relatively small American Indian tribe that has occupied the Pee Dee region for several centuries. While they received state recognition from the Government of South Carolina just after the beginning of the 21st Century, they have been seeking federal acknowledgment since 1976. While today the tribe consists of just over 200 enrolled members, they were once a significant cultural and political power in the region. Their profound influence and continual presence in the area is why the region bears the Pee Dee name. Since 1976, the tribe’s official seat of government has operated on land awarded to the tribe in Marlboro County.

== History ==
This area is within territory occupied by the Pee Dee of the South Appalachian Mississippian culture for several hundred years. Among their earthwork monuments is Town Creek Indian Mound, an important regional ceremonial site that was occupied from about 1150 to 1400 CE in Montgomery County, North Carolina, before they abandoned it for unknown reasons. It was designated as a National Historic Landmark in 1966, the only American Indian site so honored in the state. In 2017, the Pee Dee Indian Tribe officially began work on the Pee Dee Tribal Mounds located on tribal land in McColl.

Some of this area was developed for the cultivation of short-staple cotton in the antebellum era after the invention of the cotton gin. The area was also a center of lumbering and turpentine production in the early 20th century.

The town was named for D. D. McColl, a businessman.

In 2024 the town's mayor, George Garner II, died when his car collided with a truck while being pursued by a Marlboro Country police cruiser days after the entire McColl police force resigned. According to the coroner, the pursuit was "not related to any laws being broken, but rather an effort to protect the well being of Mr. Garner."

== Geography ==
According to the United States Census Bureau, the town has a total area of 1.1 square miles (2.8 km^{2}), all land.

== Demographics ==
Historical population
Census	Pop.	Note	%±
1900	1,311		—
1910	1,628		24.2%
1920	2,129		30.8%
1930	1,657		−22.2%
1940	2,391		44.3%
1950	2,688		12.4%
1960	2,479		−7.8%
1970	2,524		1.8%
1980	2,677		6.1%
1990	2,685		0.3%
2000	2,498		−7.0%
2010	2,174		−13.0%
2020	2,070		−4.8%
U.S. Decennial Census

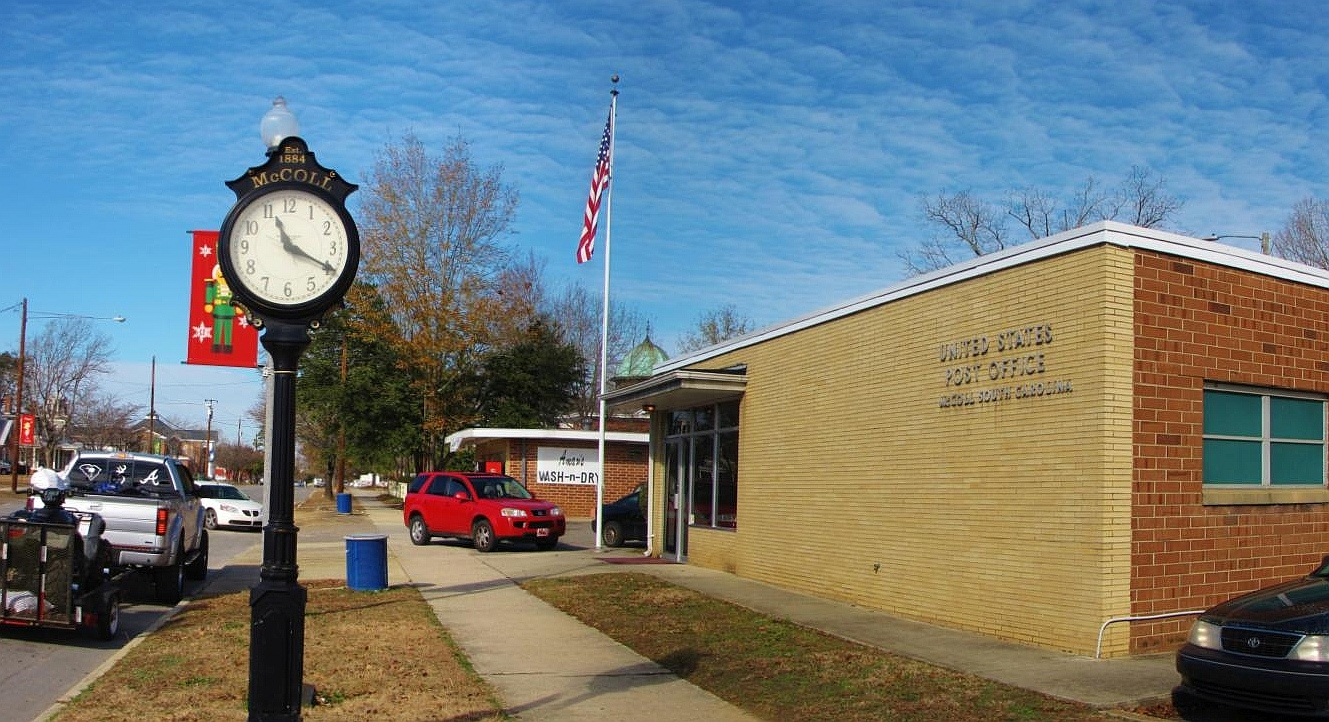
Post office and clock in McColl

=== 2000 census ===
As of the census of 2000, there were 2,498 people, 981 households, and 669 families residing in the town. The population density was 2,357.8 inhabitants per square mile (910.4/km^{2}). There were 1,090 housing units at an average density of 1,028.8 per square mile (397.2/km^{2}). The racial makeup of the town was 65.57% White, 19.22% African American, 12.69% Native American, 0.12% Asian, 0.56% from other races, and 1.84% from two or more races. Hispanic or Latino of any race were 1.48% of the population.

There were 981 households, out of which 34.5% had children under the age of 18 living with them, 41.3% were married couples living together, 21.2% had a female householder with no husband present, and 31.8% were non-families. 28.8% of all households were made up of individuals, and 11.9% had someone living alone who was 65 years of age or older. The average household size was 2.55 and the average family size was 3.14.

In the town, the population was spread out, with 28.2% under the age of 18, 10.3% from 18 to 24, 27.5% from 25 to 44, 22.7% from 45 to 64, and 11.3% who were 65 years of age or older. The median age was 34 years. For every 100 females there were 88.1 males. For every 100 females age 18 and over, there were 81.2 males.

The median income for a household in the town was $22,015, and the median income for a family was $27,460. Males had a median income of $26,313 versus $18,854 for females. The per capita income for the town was $10,177. About 28.5% of families and 31.6% of the population were below the poverty line, including 37.7% of those under age 18 and 31.2% of those age 65 or over.

=== 2020 census ===
McColl racial composition
Race	Num.	Perc.
White (non-Hispanic)	1,135	54.83%
Black or African American (non-Hispanic)	441	21.3%
Native American	343	16.57%
Asian	4	0.19%
Pacific Islander	1	0.05%
Other/Mixed	127	6.14%
Hispanic or Latino	19	0.92%

As of the 2020 United States census, there were 2,070 people, 812 households, and 537 families residing in the town.

== 2010 Census ==
According to the 2010 census, the town had a population of 2,174. Of that population, 1,235 (56.81%) were White, 493 (22.68%) were Black or African American, 364 (16.74%) were American Indian or Alaska Native, 65 (2.99%) were two or more races, 14 (0.64%) were some other race. There were 42 (1.93%) were Hispanic or Latino.

== Notable people ==
- Doc Blanchard, first Junior to win college football's Heisman Trophy award, known as "Mr. Inside" while playing for Army
- Jim Tatum, head football coach for University of North Carolina at Chapel Hill (1942, 1956–1958)
