= Poston, South Carolina =

Unincorporated community in South Carolina, United States

- Unincorporated community
- Location of Poston in South Carolina Poston, South Carolina (the United States)
- Coordinates: 33°52′25.59″N 79°25′34.20″W
- Country: United States
- State: South Carolina
- County: Florence
- Elevation: 69 ft (21 m)
- Time zone: UTC-5 (Eastern (EST))
  - Summer (DST): UTC-4 (EDT)
- GNIS feature ID: 1225649

Poston is an unincorporated community in Florence County, South Carolina, United States. It is located adjacent to South Carolina Highway 51 and U.S. Route 378. The Andrews Subdivision railroad line runs through Poston. The community lies near the Great Pee Dee River and is associated with Allisons (Ellisons or Poston) Landing, a public river-access site in Florence County.

== History ==
Poston was originally known as Ellison and functioned as a river port on the Great Pee Dee. The community was eventually absorbed by Florence County due to issues with transportation between Poston and the county seat of Marion County.

A 1916 report in The County Record stated that the town of Poston on the Seaboard Air Line was named for Andrew Poston, a local farmer who gave land to the railroad. However, locals took issue with the idea of a planned repair store in the area. This stopped Poston from growing further, and following the death of Andrew Poston, the community lost its original railroad line and fell into sharp decline.
