= South Carolina Western Railway =

20th-century railroad

Overview
- Reporting mark: SCWR
- Locale: South Carolina
- Dates of operation: 1910–1914
- Successor: Seaboard Air Line Railroad; Seaboard Coast Line Railroad; CSX Transportation; South Carolina Central Railroad

Technical
- Track gauge: 5 ft (1,524 mm)

The South Carolina Western Railway was a Southeastern railroad that operated in the early 20th century.

== History ==
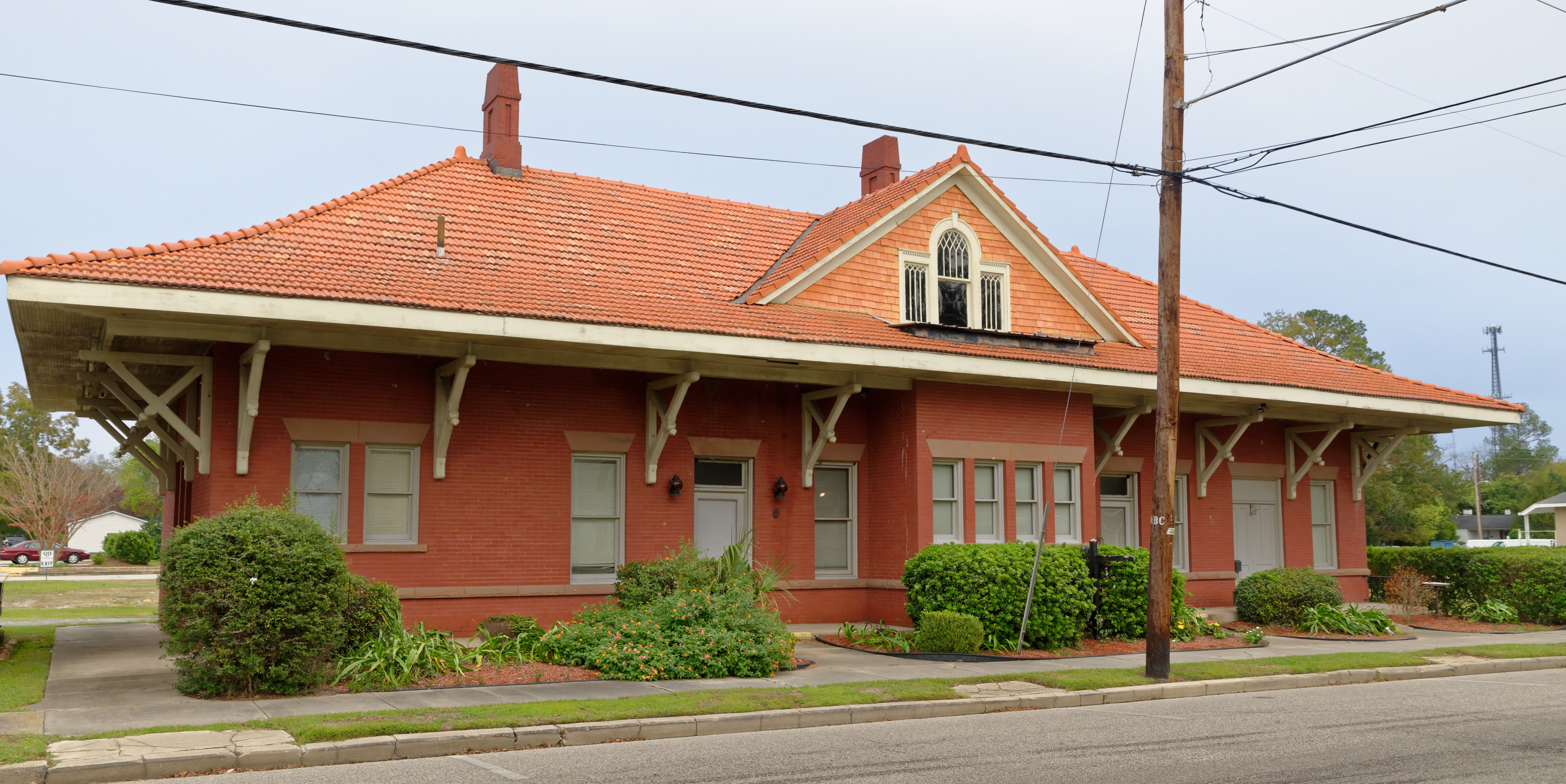
Darlington station, built by the South Carolina Western Railway in 1911.

The South Carolina Western Railway was chartered by the South Carolina General Assembly in 1910. It built a 38-mile line from the Seaboard Air Line Railroad's Main Line in McBee, South Carolina east to Florence, South Carolina in 1911. The South Carolina Western Railway Station at Darlington was completed the same year. The following year, it built lines from Hartsville, South Carolina, to Sumter, South Carolina, and from Lydia, South Carolina, to Timmonsville, South Carolina. In 1914, track was extended from Florence southeast to Poston, where it connected with the Georgetown and Western Railroad.

The South Carolina Western was merged with the Georgetown and Western Railroad, the South Carolina Western Extension Railway, and other nearly railroad in 1914 to form the Carolina, Atlantic and Western Railway.

The Carolina, Atlantic and Western Railway became part of the Seaboard Air Line Railroad in 1915. Track from McBee to Poston became their Hartsville Subdivision while track from Hartsville to Sumter became their Sumter Subdivision and the branch to Timmonsville became their Timmonsville Subdivision. The Timmonsville Subdivision was abandoned in the 1950s.

In 1967, the Seaboard Air Line (SAL) merged with the Atlantic Coast Line (ACL) to form the Seaboard Coast Line Railroad (SCL). The Atlantic Coast Line operated a nearby line from Florence to Wadesboro with a branch to Hartsville. In an effort to differentiate the lines in the combined network, the SCL added the letter S to the milepost prefixes of former SAL, making the line's prefix SJ. This was particularly important for this line considering the nearly parallel ACL route also had the milepost prefix J (which became AJ post-merger).

After the merger, the company abandoned the original South Carolina Western Railway track from Hartsville to Florence in favor of the ex-ACL route. The Seaboard Coast Line designated the former Sumter branch as part of the Hartsville Subdivision. Further south, the Seaboard Coast Line also abandoned the line from Pamplico to Poston, with the remaining line from Florence to Pamplico becoming the Pamplico Subdivision.

The Pamplico Subdivision was abandoned in the 1980s. A short stretch of track from Robinson to Hartsville was also abandoned in the 1980s. Track from Bishopville to Sumter was abandoned in 1982.

In 1980, the Seaboard Coast Line's parent company merged with the Chessie System, creating the CSX Corporation. The CSX Corporation initially operated the Chessie and Seaboard Systems separately until 1986, when they were merged into CSX Transportation. CSX sold the remaining track from Hartsville to Bishopville to the South Carolina Central Railroad on December 1, 1987.

Track is still in place from McBee to the H. B. Robinson Nuclear Generating Station, which is now CSX's Robinson Spur.

== Historic stations ==
McBee to Poston
Milepost	City/Location	Station	Connections and notes
SJ 299.9	McBee	McBee	junction with Seaboard Air Line Railroad Main Line
SJ 305.2		Leland	
SJ 306.2		Robinson	
SJ 307.9		Hickson	
SJ 309.3		Segars	
SJ 314.5	Hartsville	Hartsville	junction with: Sumter Branch; Atlantic Coast Line Railroad Hartsville Branch
SJ 319.8		Lunn	
SJ 326.2	Darlington	Darlington	junction with Atlantic Coast Line Railroad Parkton—Sumter Line
SJ 335.5	Florence	Florence	junction with Atlantic Coast Line Railroad Main Line
SJ 338.5		Fendall	
SJ 341.9		Poyner	
SJ 350.8		Perrot	
SJ 354.0	Pamplico	Pamplico	
SJ 364.5		Kingsburg	
SJ 365.7		Poston	junction with Seaboard Air Line Railroad Andrews Subdivision

Sumter Branch
Milepost	City/Location	Station	Connections and notes
SJA 314.5	Hartsville	Hartsville	junction with McBee to Poston line
SJA 320.9		Lydia	junction with Timmonsville Branch
SJA 322.8		Una	
SJA 325.8		Alcot	
SJA 330.3	Bishopville	Bishopville	junction with Atlantic Coast Line Railroad Bishopville Branch
SJA 335.3		Manville	
SJA 337.3		Ashwood	
SJA 342.7		Dubose	
SJA 345.8		Brent	
SJA 350.6		Bordeaux	
SJA 352.4	Sumter	Sumter	junction with: Atlantic Coast Line Railroad Florence—Robbins Line; Atlantic Coast Line Railroad Sumter—Columbia Line; Atlantic Coast Line Railroad Sumter–Lanes Line; Atlantic Coast Line Railroad Parkton—Sumter Line

Timmonsville Branch
Milepost	City/Location	Station	Connections and notes
SJAB 320.9		Lydia	junction with Sumter Branch
SJAB 329.7	Lamar	Lamar	junction with Atlantic Coast Line Railroad Parkton—Sumter Line
SJAB 338.0	Timmonsville	Timmonsville	junction with Atlantic Coast Line Railroad Florence—Robbins Line
