= Carolina, Atlantic and Western Railway =

South Carolina rail road

The Carolina, Atlantic and Western Railway was a South Carolina railroad that operated in the early part of the 20th century.

The Carolina, Atlantic and Western was created in 1914 when the South Carolina Western Railway, the South Carolina Western Extension Railway and the Charleston Northern Railway were merged into the North and South Carolina Railway. The name of the consolidated railroad company was then changed to the Carolina, Atlantic and Western.

In September 1915, the Charleston Southern Railway was merged into the Carolina, Atlantic and Western, and two months later the line merged with the Seaboard Air Line Railway Company.
