= Raleigh and Augusta Air Line Railroad =

Former railroad in North Carolina

Overview
- Locale: North Carolina
- Successor: Seaboard Air Line Railroad; Seaboard Coast Line Railroad; CSX Transportation

Technical
- Track gauge: 4 ft 8 1/2 in (1,435 mm) standard gauge

The Raleigh and Augusta Air Line Railroad was a North Carolina railroad that operated in the second half of the 19th century.

== History ==
=== Early years ===
The Raleigh and Augusta Air Line Railroad traces its history back to the early 1850s, when the line was chartered by the North Carolina General Assembly as the Chatham Railroad in February 1851. It changed its name to the Raleigh and Augusta Air Line Railroad in 1871, and was chartered by the South Carolina General Assembly in February 1878.

In 1871, the Chatham Railroad was reorganized as the Raleigh and Augusta Air Line Railroad. The carrier's goal was to build a line from Raleigh to Augusta, Georgia, through Columbia, South Carolina. However, it never progressed past the North Carolina-South Carolina state line, where it met the Palmetto Railroad.

The Raleigh and Gaston Railroad controlled the Raleigh and Augusta Air Line Railroad, owning most of its stock. By 1884, the Raleigh and Augusta stretched from Raleigh, North Carolina south to Hamlet, then on to the South Carolina border at Gibson. Later, the Raleigh and Gaston, and Raleigh and Augusta both fell on hard times during the Panic of 1873, and John M. Robinson, president of the Seaboard and Roanoke Railroad, acquired financial control of both carriers, becoming president of all three railroads in 1875.

=== Mergers ===
By 1881, the Seaboard and Roanoke, the Raleigh and Gaston, and others were operating as a coordinated system under the Seaboard Air-Line System name for marketing purposes, combining the nicknames of the two principal roads.

By 1883, the Raleigh and Augusta was operating nearly 100 miles (160 kilometres) of track between Raleigh and Hamlet.

In November 1899, stockholders of the Raleigh and Gaston Railroad considered the consolidation of the Raleigh and Gaston with the following other roads:

1. Raleigh and Augusta Air Line Railroad
2. Durham and Northern Railway
3. Roanoke and Tar River Railroad
4. Seaboard and Roanoke Railroad
5. Louisburg Railroad
6. Carolina Central Railroad
7. Palmetto Railroad
8. Chesterfield and Kershaw Railroad
9. Georgia, Carolina and Northern Railway
10. Seaboard Air Line Belt Railroad
11. Georgia and Alabama Railroad
12. Florida Central and Peninsular Railroad
13. Georgia and Alabama Terminal Company
14. Logansville and Lawrenceville Railroad
15. Richmond, Petersburg and Carolina Railroad
16. Pittsboro Railroad
17. Southbound Railroad

The resulting company became known as the Seaboard Air Line Railroad. The Raleigh and Augusta Air Line was merged into the Seaboard in November 1901.

In 1967, the Seaboard Air Line merged with its rival, the Atlantic Coast Line Railroad. The merged company was named the Seaboard Coast Line Railroad. In 1980, the Seaboard Coast Line's parent company merged with the Chessie System, creating the CSX Corporation. The CSX Corporation initially operated the Chessie and Seaboard Systems separately until 1986, when they were merged into CSX Transportation. The line is still in service and it is part of CSX's S Line (Aberdeen Subdivision and Hamlet Terminal Subdivision).

== Historic stations ==
| Milepost | City/Location | Station | Connections and notes |
|---|---|---|---|
| S 156.1 | Raleigh | Raleigh | Amtrak Silver Star, Carolinian, and Piedmont station rebuilt in 2018 junction with: Raleigh and Gaston Railroad (SAL); Raleigh, Charlotte and Southern Railway (SOU); Norfolk Southern Railway (SOU) |
| S 160.2 | Raleigh | Meredith College | |
| S 160.5 | Raleigh | Method | |
| S 168.3 | Cary | Cary | Amtrak Silver Star, Carolinian, and Piedmont station rebuilt in 1996 junction with North Carolina Railroad (SOU) |
| S 171.1 | Apex | Apex | junction with Durham and Southern Railway |
| | | Jordans | |
| S 177.3 | | New Hill | |
| S 179.8 | | Bonsal | junction with Durham and South Carolina Railroad (SOU) |
| S 181.1 | | Merry Oaks | |
| S 185.8 | | Haywood | |
| S 187.3 | | Moncure | junction with Pittsboro Railroad |
| | | Olives | |
| S 193.4 | | Osgood | |
| S 195.1 | | Colon | junction with Raleigh and Western Railway (SOU) |
| S 198.9 | Sanford | Sanford | junction with: Atlantic and Western Railway; Atlantic and Yadkin Railway (SOU); Cape Fear and Yadkin Valley Railway (ACL) |
| S 205.6 | | Lemon Springs | |
| S 211.1 | Cameron | Cameron | |
| S 216.6 | Vass | Vass | also known as Winder |
| S 217.8 | | Lakeview | |
| S 221.8 | Niagara | Niagara | |
| S 223.6 | | Manly | |
| S 225.0 | Southern Pines | Southern Pines | Amtrak Silver Star |
| S 228.7 | Aberdeen | Aberdeen | junction with: Aberdeen and Asheboro Railroad (NS); Aberdeen and Rockfish Railroad |
| S 231.0 | Pinebluff | Pinebluff | |
| S 233.0 | | Addor | |
| S 239.4 | Hoffman | Hoffman | |
| S 243.2 | | Marston | |
| S 246.2 | | Cognac | |
| S 253.4 | Hamlet | Hamlet | Amtrak Silver Star station rebuilt in 1900 junction with: Palmetto Railroad (SAL); Carolina Central Railway (SAL) |
| SH 263.7 | Gibson | Gibson | continues as Seaboard Air Line Railroad Andrews Subdivision |
