= South Bound Railroad =

Overview
- Locale: South Carolina; Georgia
- Successor: Seaboard Air Line Railroad; Seaboard Coast Line Railroad

Technical
- Track gauge: 4 ft 8 1/2 in (1,435 mm) standard gauge

The South Bound Railroad was a Southeastern railroad that operated in South Carolina and Georgia in the late 19th century and early 20th century.

== History ==
The South Bound Railroad was chartered by the South Carolina General Assembly in 1882 and by the Georgia Legislature in 1888.

The 136-mile line from Savannah, Georgia, to Columbia, South Carolina, opened in 1891. The following year it was leased to the Florida Central and Peninsular Railroad. By the end of the decade, the South Bound Railroad had reached Camden, South Carolina, to meet the Chesterfield and Kershaw Railroad.

In late 1899, stockholders of the Raleigh and Gaston Railroad met in Raleigh, to consider the merger of the Raleigh and Gaston with the South Bound Railroad, along with the Raleigh and Augusta Air Line Railroad, the Durham and Northern Railway, the Roanoke and Tar River Railroad, the Seaboard and Roanoke Railroad, the Louisburg Railroad, the Carolina Central Railroad, the Palmetto Railroad, the Chesterfield and Kershaw Railroad, the Georgia, Carolina and Northern Railway, the Seaboard Air Line Belt Railroad, the Georgia and Alabama Railroad, the Florida Central and Peninsular Railroad, the Georgia and Alabama Terminal Company, the Logansville and Lawrenceville Railroad, the Richmond, Petersburg and Carolina Railroad and the Pittsboro Railroad.

The resulting company became known as the Seaboard Air Line Railroad. The South Bound was merged into the Seaboard in 1901.

== Station listing ==
State	Milepost	City/Location	Station	Connections and notes
SC	S 326.5	Camden	Camden	Amtrak Silver Star rebuilt in 1937 continues as Chesterfield and Kershaw Railroad (SAL)
SC	S 330.7	Lugoff	Lugoff	
SC	S 339.0	Elgin	Elgin	originally Blaney
SC	S 344.4	Pontiac	Pontiac	
SC	S 349.4		Weddell	
SC	S 351.4		Dents	
SC	S 355.6		Hyatts	
SC	S 360.7	Columbia	Columbia	Amtrak Silver Star rebuilt in 1903 and 1991 originally junction with: Columbia, Newberry and Laurens Railroad (ACL); Wilmington, Columbia and Augusta Railroad (ACL); Charlotte, Columbia and Augusta Railroad (SOU); Spartanburg, Union and Columbia Railroad (SOU); Carolina Midland Railway (SOU)
SC	S 362.5	Cayce	Cayce	
SC	S 366.5		Dixiana	
SC	S 371.6	Gaston	Gaston	
SC	S 381.0	Swansea	Swansea	
SC	S 385.6	Woodford	Woodford	
SC	S 393.7	Livingston	Livingston	
SC	S 395.4	Neeses	Neeses	
SC	S 402.0	Norway	Norway	
SC	S 414.1	Denmark	Denmark	Amtrak Silver Star
SC	S 417.7	Govan	Govan	
SC	S 420.8		Olar	
SC	S 424.3		Schofield	
SC	S 426.2	Ulmer	Ulmer	
SC	S 433.4	Sycamore	Sycamore	
SC	S 436.0	Fairfax	Fairfax	junction with Charleston & Western Carolina Railway (ACL)
SC	S 442.8	Gifford	Gifford	
SC	S 446.1		Luray	
SC	S 450.5	Estill	Estill	
SC	S 454.1	Scotia	Scotia	
SC	S 460.2		Garnett	
GA	S 469.0		Clyo	
GA	S 472.5		Berryville	
GA	S 478.8		Stillwell	
GA	S 481.2	Rincon	Rincon	
GA	S 484.5		Exley	
GA	S 490.1		Meinhard	
GA	S 497.3	Savannah	Central Junction	junction with: Charleston and Savannah Railroad (SF&W/ACL); Savannah and Atlantic Railroad (CoG/SOU)
GA	S 501.8	Savannah	Savannah	junction with: Florida Central and Peninsular Railroad Northern Division (SAL); Savannah, Florida and Western Railway (ACL); Georgia and Alabama Railway (SAL)
