= Hamlet Terminal Subdivision =

Railway line in North Carolina

The Hamlet Terminal Subdivision is a railroad line owned by CSX Transportation in North Carolina. The Hamlet Terminal Subdivision is composed of three lines, all of which originate in Marston and terminate in Hamlet.

== Lines ==
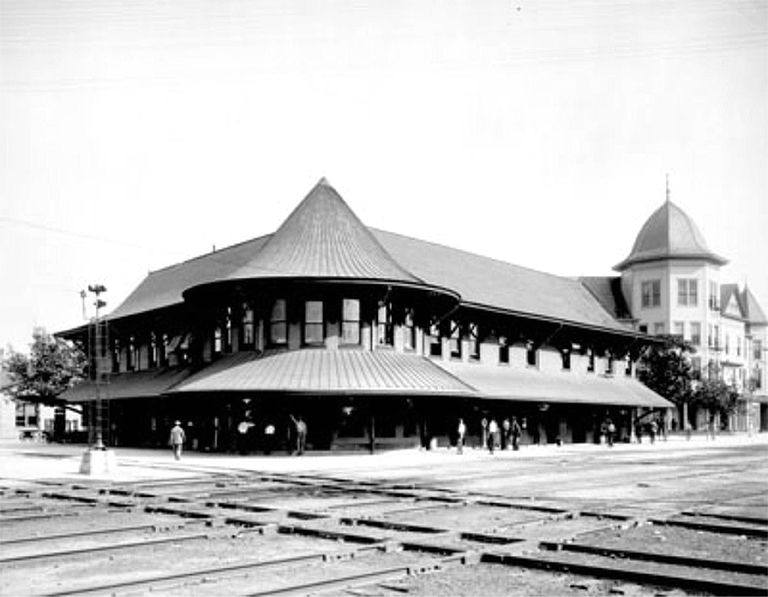
Seaboard depot and hotel, about 1915, at the junction in Hamlet.

The Hamlet Terminal Subdivision is made up of three individual lines. The three lines converge at Monroe Junction and run parallel from there north to Warmac Interlocking where they combine.

=== S Line ===
The S Line runs northeast to southwest. At its north end the line continues south from the Aberdeen Subdivision and at its south end the line continues south as the Hamlet Subdivision.

=== SF Line ===
At its north end the line continues south from the S Line at Warmac Interlocking and turns northwest at Monroe Junction. At its south end it continues south as the Monroe Subdivision.

=== SH Line ===
At its north end the line continues south from the S Line at Warmac Interlocking and turns southeast and at its south end it continues south as the Andrews Subdivision.

== History ==
The S Line north of Hamlet was originally built in 1877 as part of the Raleigh and Augusta Air-Line Railroad. From Hamlet south, the line was originally part of the Palmetto Railroad and began service in 1887. Both lines were merged into the Seaboard Air Line Railroad in 1901 and made up their main line.

The SF and SH Lines were built in 1874 by the Carolina Central Railway, which would also become part of the Seaboard Air Line. This made Hamlet an important junction for Seaboard.

== See also ==
- List of CSX Transportation lines
