= Columbia station (South Carolina) =

Train station in Columbia, South Carolina, US

Columbia, SC
- The Silver Star at Columbia station in 2007

General information
- Location: 850 Pulaski Street; Columbia, South Carolina; United States
- Coordinates: 33.9943°N 81.0403°W
- Owner: City of Columbia
- Line: CSX Columbia Subdivision
- Platforms: 1 side platform
- Tracks: 2

Construction
- Accessible: Yes

Other information
- Station code: Amtrak: CLB

History
- Opened: January 15, 1991

Passengers
- FY 2025: 31,084 (Amtrak)

Services
| Preceding station | Amtrak | Following station |
|---|---|---|
| Denmark toward Miami | Floridian | Camden toward Chicago |
Former services
| Preceding station | Amtrak | Following station |
|---|---|---|
| Denmark toward Miami | Silver Star until 2024 | Camden toward New York |
Location

Columbia station is an Amtrak train station in the Congaree Vista neighborhood of Columbia, South Carolina, served by the daily Floridian. The station opened in 1991, replacing a 1904-built Seaboard Air Line Railway station two blocks east.

== History ==
The 1904-built station in 1976

The South Bound Railroad, opened in 1891, entered Columbia from the south on the tracks of the Southern Railway. In 1893, it became part of the Florida Central and Peninsular Railroad, which in turn merged into the Seaboard Air Line Railroad in 1900. The Seaboard constructed a northern extension of the South Bound at the turn of the century. It passed through Columbia on a viaduct and tunnel along Lincoln Street. The Seaboard declined to join the Southern and the Atlantic Coast Line Railroad at Union Station, which was built in 1902. Instead, the Seaboard constructed a brick station building north of Gervais Street. The foundation was constructed in 1903. Work on the station building began on March 23, 1904; it opened on October 20, 1904.

Amtrak took over intercity passenger service in the United States in May 1971. The station building and a nearby freight house were added to the National Register of Historic Places in 1983 as contributing properties to the West Gervais Street Historic District. In 1987, the former Southern/Atlantic Coast Line tracks two blocks to the west were lowered to eliminate level crossings. A new 2,800-square-foot (260 m^{2}) steel station building was constructed off Pulaski Street. The city planned to construct an office building around the structure. The Silver Star began using the new station on January 15, 1991.

The former station building was converted for restaurant use. The trestle to the south was removed; the Lincoln Street Tunnel was later converted to the Vista Greenway rail trail, which opened in 2012. On November 10, 2024, the Silver Star was merged with the Capitol Limited as the Floridian.
