= Hillsborough station =

Hillsborough station may refer to:

- Hillsborough station (North Carolina), a proposed Amtrak station in Hillsborough, North Carolina
- Hillsborough railway station (Northern Ireland), a former railway station in Hillsborough, County Down, Northern Ireland
- Hillsborough Interchange, a bus and tram interchange in Sheffield, United Kingdom
