= Laurens Railway =

The Laurens Railway was a successor to the Laurens Railroad, a shortline carrier that served the South Carolina Upstate region in the 19th century. It was a 5 ft (1,524 mm) gauge railroad line

The Laurens Railroad apparently went out of business after the American Civil War. By 1881 it had been reorganized and was operating as the Laurens Railway. It survived under that named until it was bought by the Columbia, Newberry and Laurens Railroad in 1894.
