= Hillsborough station (North Carolina) =

Planned train station in Hillsborough, North Carolina

Hillsborough, NC
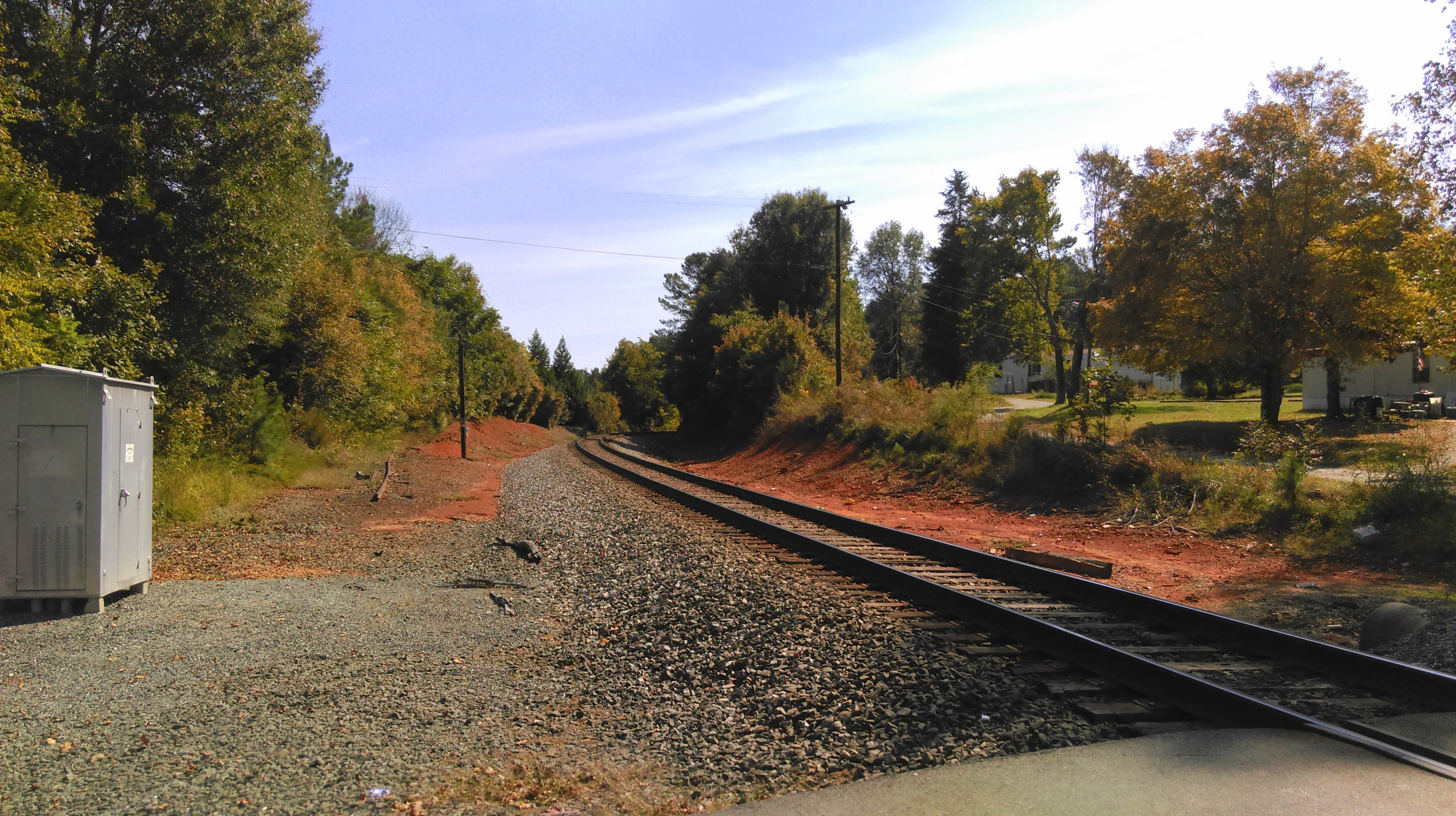
- Future station site photographed in 2016

General information
- Location: US 70 Business near Churton Street; Hillsborough, North Carolina; United States
- Coordinates: 36.06817°N 79.09803°W
- Owner: Town of Hillsborough
- Line: NCRR Corridor

Construction
- Architect: Clearscapes
Future services
Preceding station	Amtrak	Following station
Burlington toward Charlotte	Carolinian	Durham toward New York
Burlington toward Charlotte	Piedmont	Durham toward Raleigh
Location

Hillsborough station is a planned infill train station in Hillsborough, North Carolina, located on the North Carolina Railroad (NCRR). According to town officials, the station building will have a meeting space, similar to Kannapolis station. When it is completed, Amtrak's Carolinian and Piedmont will serve the station. Along with the Durham station it will be the nearest Amtrak stations to the University of North Carolina at Chapel Hill.

== History ==
The city purchased the 20-acre (8.1 ha) parcel around c. 2009 to construct a rail station.

Plans originally called for a station near the intersection of Churton Street (old NC 86) and US 70 Business to be completed by 2015 at a cost of $8.9 million. After unanticipated delays between NCRR, Norfolk Southern Railway and the North Carolina Department of Transportation, construction was initially scheduled for 2019–2020 with $7.2 million currently budgeted and a projected cost of $8.4 million. However, after further delays, the Hillsborough town commission signed an interlocal agreement with GoTriangle and NCDOT in April 2020, with construction slated for 2027 on a budget of $8.1 million.

== Proposed station layout ==
The station is planned as a single story, 8,000 square feet (740 m^{2}) building, with a covered patio, waiting area, attendant's office and a walkway to a side platform along the tracks. The station will also have an auditorium for public meetings and space for town offices. An elevated greenway is planned, which will pass over the tracks and connect to a future second side platform via elevators. The planned greenway will connect downtown and the Hillsborough Riverwalk to the station, then continue south to Cates Creek Park. The station building is planned as a sustainable structure, with a green roof, natural lighting and building-integrated photovoltaics.
