= Chesterfield and Kershaw Railroad =

Railroad in South Carolina, US

Overview
- Locale: South Carolina
- Successor: Seaboard Air Line Railroad; Seaboard Coast Line Railroad

Technical
- Track gauge: 4 ft 8 1/2 in (1,435 mm) standard gauge

The Chesterfield and Kershaw Railroad was a railroad that operated in South Carolina in the late 19th and early 20th century.

== History ==
The company was chartered by South Carolina General Assembly in 1889.

The Chesterfield and Kershaw ran from Cheraw, South Carolina, to Camden, South Carolina.

The line merged with the Seaboard Air Line Railroad in 1901 and became part of their main line. In 1967, the Seaboard Air Line merged with its rival, the Atlantic Coast Line Railroad. The merged company was named the Seaboard Coast Line Railroad. In 1980, the Seaboard Coast Line's parent company merged with the Chessie System, creating the CSX Corporation. The CSX Corporation initially operated the Chessie and Seaboard Systems separately until 1986, when they were merged into CSX Transportation. The line is still in service and it is part of CSX's S Line (Hamlet Subdivision).

== Historic stations ==
Milepost	City/Location	Station	Connections and notes
S 271.8	Cheraw	Cheraw	junction with: Palmetto Railroad (SAL); Cheraw and Darlington Railroad (ACL); Chesterfield and Lancaster Railroad (SAL); Bennettsville and Cheraw Railroad
S 276.7		Kimberly	
S 279.8		Gillespie	
S 284.9	Patrick	Patrick	station rebuilt in 1900
S 290.8		McKennon	
S 292.0		Middendorf	
S 299.3	McBee	McBee	rebuilt in 1914
S 303.9		Big Springs	
S 307.0	Bethune	Bethune	
S 312.6		Cassatt	
S 319.5		Shepard	
S 326.5	Camden	Camden	Amtrak Silver Star station rebuilt in 1937 line continues as the South Bound Railroad (FC&P/SAL)
