= Georgia, Carolina and Northern Railway =

Overview
- Locale: North Carolina; South Carolina; Georgia
- Dates of operation: 1886–1900
- Successor: Seaboard Air Line Railroad

Technical
- Length: 269.4 miles (433.6 km)

The Georgia, Carolina and Northern Railway was a Southeastern railroad that began after Reconstruction and operated up until the start of the 20th century. It ran from Monroe, North Carolina to Atlanta, Georgia and later became part of the Seaboard Air Line Railroad.

== History ==
=== Construction and early years ===
The Georgia, Carolina and Northern Railway was founded in 1886 with the goal of building a line from Monroe, North Carolina, to Atlanta, Georgia. Construction on the line began in 1887 in North Carolina.

By 1892 the railroad had almost completed its original plan when a court injunction halted its progress into Atlanta. As a result, the GC&N developed the Seaboard Air Line Belt Railroad. The Seaboard Air Line Belt Railroad ran about 8 miles (13 km) from Belt Junction (near Emory University) west to the Nashville, Chattanooga and St. Louis Railway for which the Georgia, Carolina and Northern Railway had trackage rights into Atlanta. In 1898 the railroad acquired the Loganville and Lawrenceville Railroad.

=== Seaboard Air Line years ===
Abbeville and Atlanta Subdivisions

Overview
- Status: Still operating under CSX
- Owner: Seaboard Air Line Railroad
- Termini: Monroe, North Carolina; Atlanta, Georgia

Technical
- Line length: 269.4 mi (433.6 km)
- Electrification: No

In 1901 the GC&N was formally merged into the Seaboard Air Line Railway. The Seaboard operated the line as their Abbeville Subdivision from Monroe to Abbeville, South Carolina and as their Atlanta Subdivision from Abbeville to Atlanta. The Seaboard primarily used the line for passenger services to Atlanta. The Silver Comet, The Cherry Blossoms, and The Capitol were passenger trains that ran the line daily from Monroe to Atlanta.

=== Later years ===
In 1967, the Seaboard Air Line merged with its rival, the Atlantic Coast Line Railroad (ACL). The merged company was named the Seaboard Coast Line Railroad (SCL). Seaboard Coast Line designated the entire line from Monroe to Atlanta as the Abbeville Subdivision. The Silver Comet was discontinued the following year.

In 1980, the Seaboard Coast Line's parent company merged with the Chessie System, creating the CSX Corporation. The CSX Corporation initially operated the Chessie and Seaboard Systems separately until 1986, when they were merged into CSX Transportation. CSX would later truncate the Abbeville Subdivision designation at Abbeville with track north of there being annexed to the Monroe Subdivision.

== Current operations ==
The full line is still in service today and it is still operated by CSX Transportation. The line is the primary route from the Northeast to Atlanta, and it is dispatched by Centralized traffic control.

=== Monroe to Abbeville ===
The line from Monroe to Abbeville is now part of the CSX's Monroe Subdivision. The Monroe Subdivision also includes track from Monroe to just outside of Hamlet, North Carolina.

=== Abbeville Subdivision ===
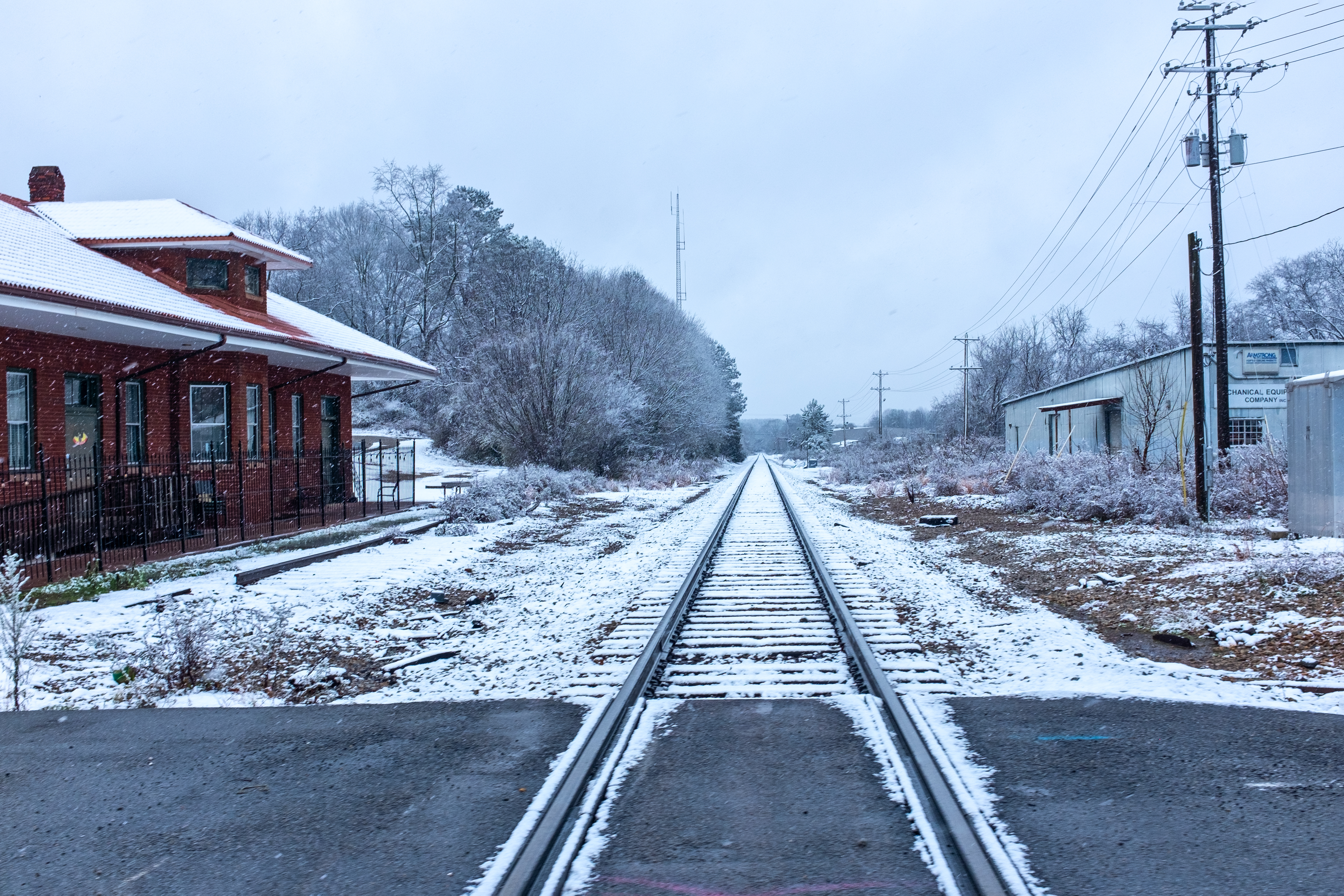
The Abbeville Subdivision with a rare dusting of snow at the Lawrenceville Depot

From Abbeville to Tucker, Georgia, the line is CSX's Abbeville Subdivision. The Abbeville Subdivision connects with CSX's Gainesville Midland Subdivision and the Hartwell Railroad in Athens, Georgia. It also serves Total Distribution Services Inc. (TDSI), a CSX subsidiary, near Lawrenceville, Georgia.

=== Tucker to Atlanta ===
The line from Tucker to Atlanta is part of CSX's Atlanta Terminal Subdivision, which also includes the company's other rail lines within Atlanta.

== Historic stations ==
State	Milepost	City/Location	Station	Connections and notes
NC	SG 306.2	Monroe	Monroe	junction with Carolina Central Railroad (SAL)
NC	SG 311.2		Houston	
NC	SG 318.3	Waxhaw	Waxhaw	
SC	SG 330.5	Catawba	Catawba	junction with Catawba Valley Railway (SAL)
SC	SG 335.8		Manney	
SC	SG 337.5		Edgemoor	
SC	SG 342.2		Rodman	
SC	SG 349.0		Landrum	
SC	SG 351.1	Chester	Chester	junction with: Charlotte, Columbia and Augusta Railroad (SOU); Carolina and Northwestern Railway (SOU)
SC	SG 355.9		Wilkes	
SC	SG 363.4		Leeds	
SC	SG 368.2	Carlisle	Carlisle	junction with Spartanburg, Union and Columbia Railroad (SOU)
SC	SG 375.6		Delta	
SC	SG 379.9	Whitmire	Whitmire	
SC	SG 385.6		Garlington	
SC	SG 392.7		Shands	
SC	SG 397.0	Clinton	Clinton	junction with Columbia, Newberry and Laurens Railroad (ACL)
SC	SG 401.6		Fuller	
SC	SG 406.6		Mountville	
SC	SG 411.0	Cross Hill	Cross Hill	
SC	SG 416.6		Lota	
SC	SG 421.1		McDowell	
SC	SG 425.0	Greenwood	Greenwood	junction with: Greenville and Columbia Railroad (SOU); Piedmont and Northern Railway; Charleston and Western Carolina Railway Main Line (ACL); Georgia and Florida Railroad
SC	SG 429.5		Bullock	
SC	SG 434.8		Long Cane	
SC	SG 440.0	Abbeville	Abbeville	
SC	SG 440.7	Abbeville	Shops	
SC	SG 447.5		Watts	
SC	SG 454.5	Calhoun Falls	Calhoun Falls	junction with Charleston and Western Carolina Railway Anderson Branch (ACL)
GA	SG 461.5		Heardmont	
GA	SG 469.1		Swift	
GA	SG 471.5	Elberton	Elberton	junction with: Richmond and Danville Railroad Elberton Branch (SOU); Elberton and Eastern Railway
GA	SG 473.6		Wester	
GA	SG 479.8		Oglesby	
GA	SG 483.4		Berkely	
GA	SG 486.0		Ross	
GA	SG 489.0	Comer	Comer	
GA	SG 499.2	Hull	Hull	
GA	SG 505.7	Athens	Athens	junction with: North Eastern Railroad (SOU); Macon and Northern Railway (CoG/SOU)
GA	SG 507.2	Athens	Fowler Junction	junction with Gainesville Midland Railway
GA	SG 515.1	Bogart	Bogart	
GA	SG 522.0		Harper	
GA	SG 527.0	Winder	Winder	
GA	SG 533.5	Auburn	Auburn	
GA	SG 538.1	Dacula	Dacula	
GA	SG 544.1	Lawrenceville	Lawrenceville	
GA	SG 550.0		Gloster	
GA	SG 554.7	Lilburn	Lilburn	
GA	SG 560.6	Tucker	Tucker	
GA	SG 567.5		Belt Junction	junction with Seaboard Air Line Belt Railway
GA	SGB 582.0	Atlanta	Inman Park	located on Seaboard Air Line Belt Railway
GA	SG 568.5	Atlanta	Emory	
GA	SG 571.8	Atlanta	Mina	
GA	SG 574.8	Atlanta	Howell Yard	junction with Atlanta and Birmingham Air Line Railway (SAL)
GA	SG 575.6	Atlanta	W&A Junction	junction with Nashville, Chattanooga and St. Louis Railway
GA		Atlanta	Terminal Station	
