= North Carolina State Fair station =

Railway station in Raleigh, North Carolina, US

North Carolina State Fair
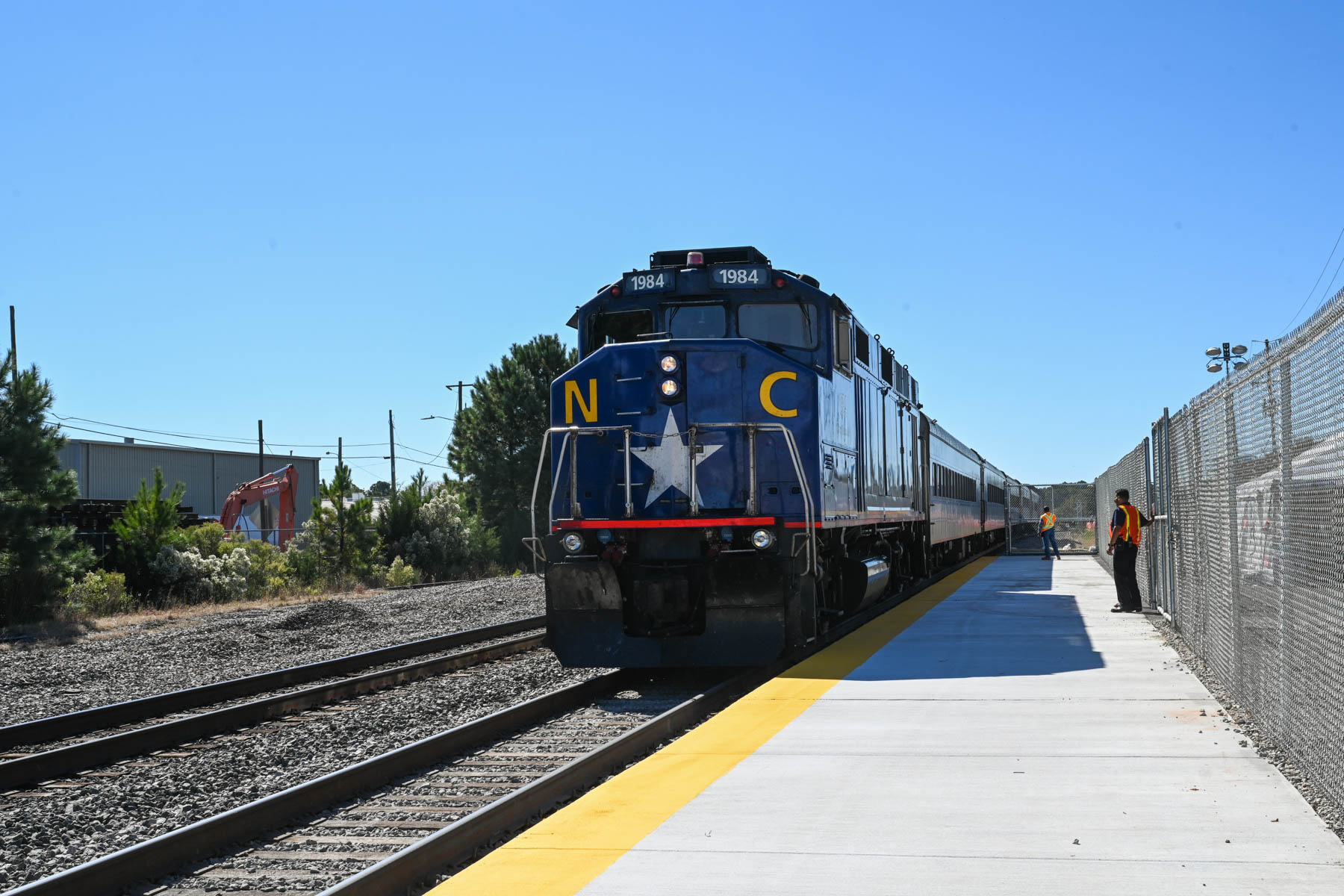
- The Piedmont at the station in 2024

General information
- Location: 1025 Blue Ridge Road; Raleigh, North Carolina; United States
- Coordinates: 35°47′39″N 78°42′22″W
- Lines: NCRR Corridor; Aberdeen Subdivision
- Platforms: 1 side platform
- Tracks: 3

Construction
- Parking: No
- Accessible: Yes

Other information
- Status: Seasonal; platform only
- Station code: Amtrak: NSF

History
- Opened: October 12, 1990

Passengers
- FY 2025: 5,203 (Amtrak)

Services
Preceding station	Amtrak	Following station
Cary toward Charlotte	Carolinian	Raleigh toward New York
Cary toward Charlotte	Piedmont	Raleigh Terminus
Floridian does not stop here
Location

North Carolina State Fair station is a seasonal Amtrak station serving the North Carolina State Fairground in Raleigh, North Carolina. It is served by Amtrak's Carolinian and Piedmont trains when the fair is in operation in mid-October.

The station waiting area is normally a tent on the west corner of Blue Ridge Road and south corner of Hillsborough Street. There are no ticketing services on site. A wheelchair lift stored near the grade crossing provides accessibility to passengers.

Amtrak began directly serving the fair in the 1990 season. In 2023 and 2024, the station was relocated west due to road construction.

Across the tracks from the fairgrounds is an abandoned freight spur leading to a North Carolina Department of Transportation equipment storage facility along Beryl Road, and another leading to a storage warehouse. Sidetracks exist on both sides of the tracks between Powell Drive and Blue Ridge Road.
