= Durham station (North Carolina) =

Rail station in Durham, North Carolina, US

Durham, NC
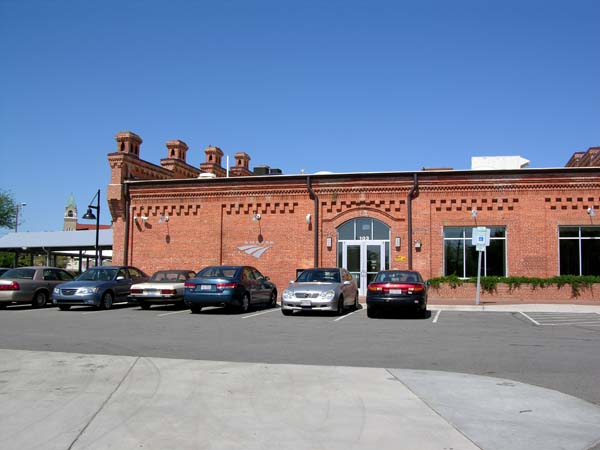

General information
- Location: 601 West Main Street; Durham, North Carolina; United States
- Coordinates: 35°59′51″N 78°54′23″W
- Owner: City of Durham
- Line: NCRR Corridor
- Platforms: 1 side platform
- Tracks: 1
- Connections: GoDurham

Construction
- Structure type: At-grade
- Parking: 74 spaces
- Accessible: Yes

Other information
- Station code: Amtrak: DNC

History
- Opened: 1990 (platform); 1996 (station building)
- Rebuilt: 2009

Passengers
- FY 2025: 154,793 (Amtrak)

Services
Preceding station	Amtrak	Following station
Burlington toward Charlotte	Carolinian	Cary toward New York
Burlington toward Charlotte	Piedmont	Cary toward Raleigh
Location

Durham station is an Amtrak station located in Durham, North Carolina. It is served by two passenger trains: the Carolinian and the Piedmont. The street address is 601 West Main Street and is located in West Village in downtown Durham. The station is open from 6:30am to 9:00pm daily. There is free, unattended parking at the station.

The station is located in the Walker Warehouse building of the former Liggett and Myers tobacco complex. It opened on July 8, 2009. From 1996 to 2009, the Carolinian and Piedmont stopped at an "Amshack" modular station across the street from the warehouse. The platform itself dates from 1990, when the Carolinian began service; passengers used a heated shelter until the "Amshack" was built in 1996.

The historic warehouse is a brick structure erected in 1897 by the American Tobacco Company trust. Included in the Bright Leaf National Register Historic District, the building is marked by impressive decorative brickwork such as corbeled pendants and mousetoothing at the cornice and parapet. The station was a joint venture of the North Carolina Department of Transportation (NCDOT) and the city of Durham. The former entered into an agreement with developer Blue Devil Partners to lease and up-fit one third of the Walker Warehouse, while the city was responsible for 25 percent of the lease costs.

The station is frequently used by students at nearby Duke University. It is also the nearest station to the University of North Carolina at Chapel Hill until the Hillsborough station opens when they both will be approximately equidistant from the university.

== History ==
In 2024, Amtrak spent $1.5 million in upgrades to the station. This included installation of new doors, upgrades to restroom, new fire alarm system, signage, cane detection, and accessible pathways extending from the parking lot to the station and platform.

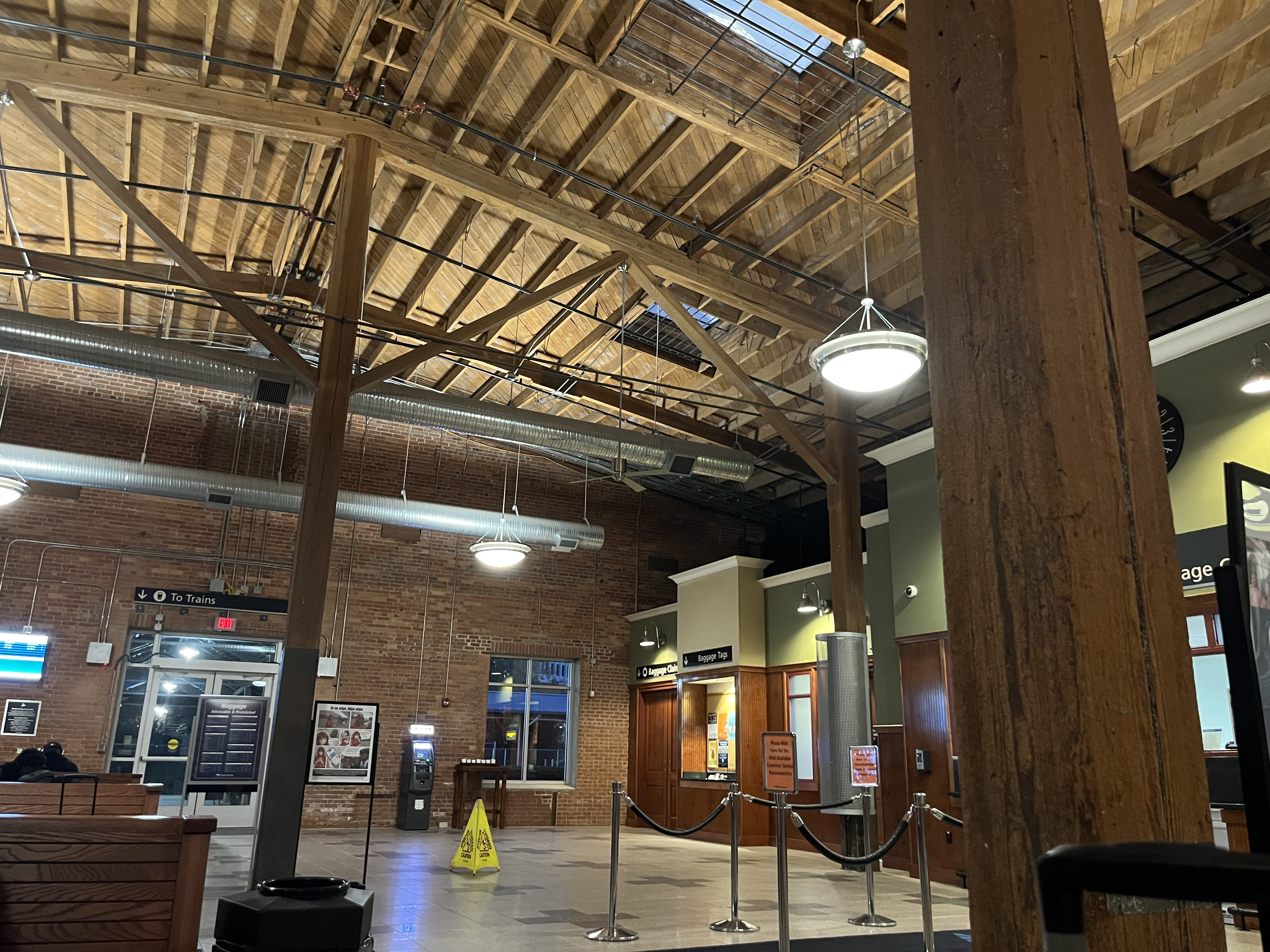
Durham Station interior waiting area

== Routes ==
- Carolinian
- Piedmont
