= Palmetto Railroad =

Overview
- Locale: North Carolina; South Carolina
- Successor: Seaboard Air Line Railroad; Seaboard Coast Line Railroad

Technical
- Track gauge: 4 ft 8 1/2 in (1,435 mm) standard gauge

The Palmetto Railroad was a Southeastern railroad that served South Carolina and North Carolina in the late 19th century.

The Palmetto Railroad was chartered by the South Carolina General Assembly in 1882 and the North Carolina General Assembly in 1883.

The line stretched from Hamlet, North Carolina, to Cheraw, South Carolina, where it connected with the Cheraw and Darlington Railroad. Construction of the 18-mile stretch was completed in 1887.

That same year, the Raleigh and Augusta Air Line Railroad leased the Palmetto Railroad line.

In 1895, the company was reorganized due to financial difficulties and renamed the Palmetto Railway.

In 1900, the Raleigh and Augusta Air Line Railroad and Palmetto Railway became part of Seaboard Air Line Railway. The line became part of Seaboard's main line.

In 1967, the Seaboard Air Line merged with its rival, the Atlantic Coast Line Railroad. The merged company was named the Seaboard Coast Line Railroad. In 1980, the Seaboard Coast Line's parent company merged with the Chessie System, creating the CSX Corporation. The CSX Corporation initially operated the Chessie and Seaboard Systems separately until 1986, when they were merged into CSX Transportation. The line is still in service and it is part of CSX's S Line (Hamlet Subdivision).

== Station Listing ==
State	Milepost	City/Location	Station	Connections and notes
NC	S 253.2	Hamlet	Hamlet	Amtrak Silver Star station rebuilt in 1900 junction with: Raleigh and Augusta Air Line Railroad (SAL); Carolina Central Railroad (SAL)
NC	S 260.8		Osborne	
SC	S 265.3		Fulton	
SC	S 269.3		Wallace	
SC	S 270.0		Kollocks	
SC	S 271.8	Cheraw	Cheraw	junction with: Chesterfield and Kershaw Railroad (SAL); Cheraw and Darlington Railroad (ACL); Chesterfield and Lancaster Railroad (SAL); Bennettsville and Cheraw Railroad
