= Marston Mat =

Perforated steel planks for temporary runways

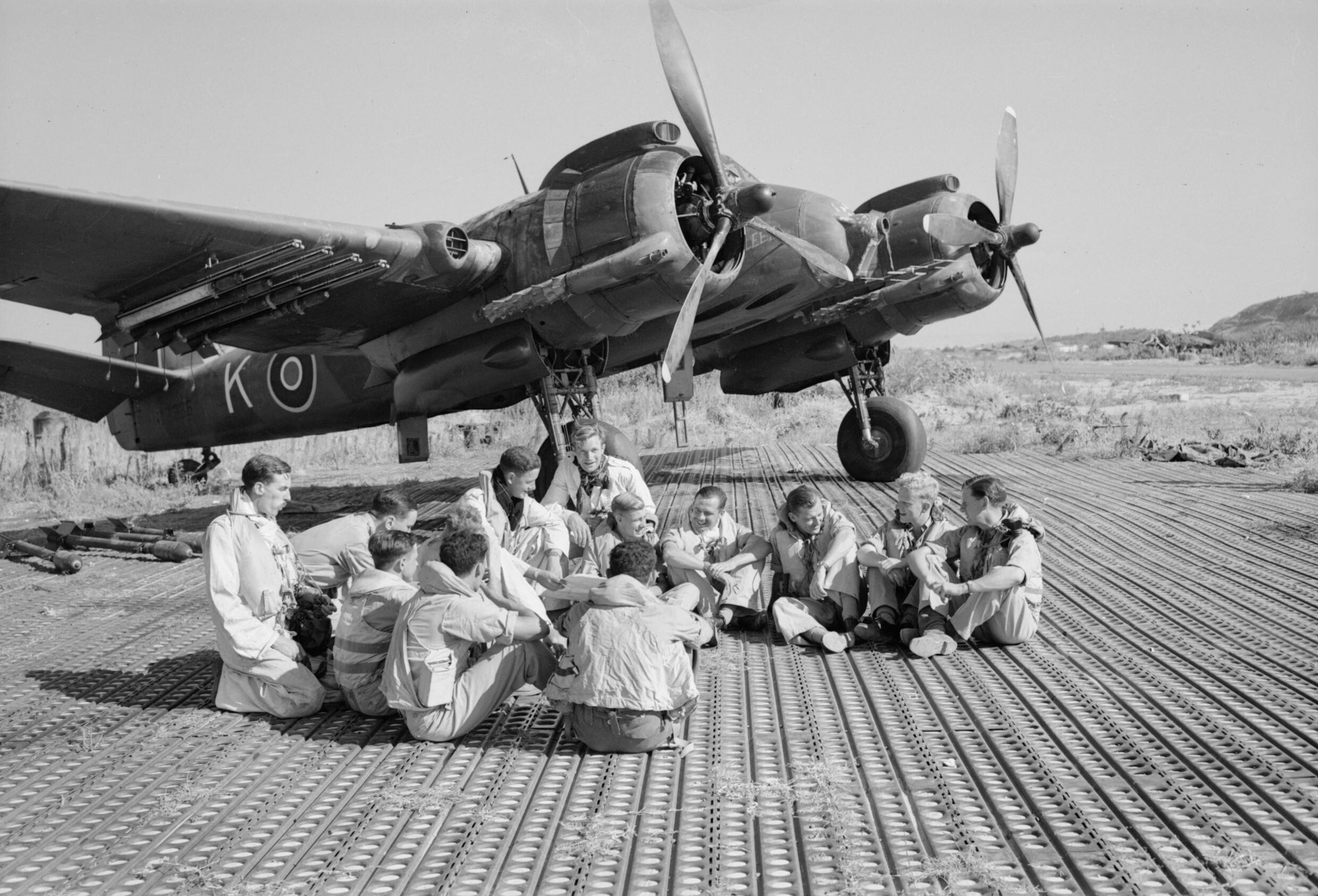
Royal Air Force and South African Air Force aircrew with one of their Bristol Beaufighters on a PSP airstrip at Biferno, Italy, August 1944

Marston Mat, also misspelled as Marsden matting, but more properly called pierced (or perforated) steel planking (PSP), is standardized, perforated steel matting material developed by the United States at the Waterways Experiment Station shortly before World War II, primarily for the rapid construction of temporary runways and landing strips. The nickname came from Marston, North Carolina, adjacent to Camp Mackall airfield where the material was first used.

== Description ==
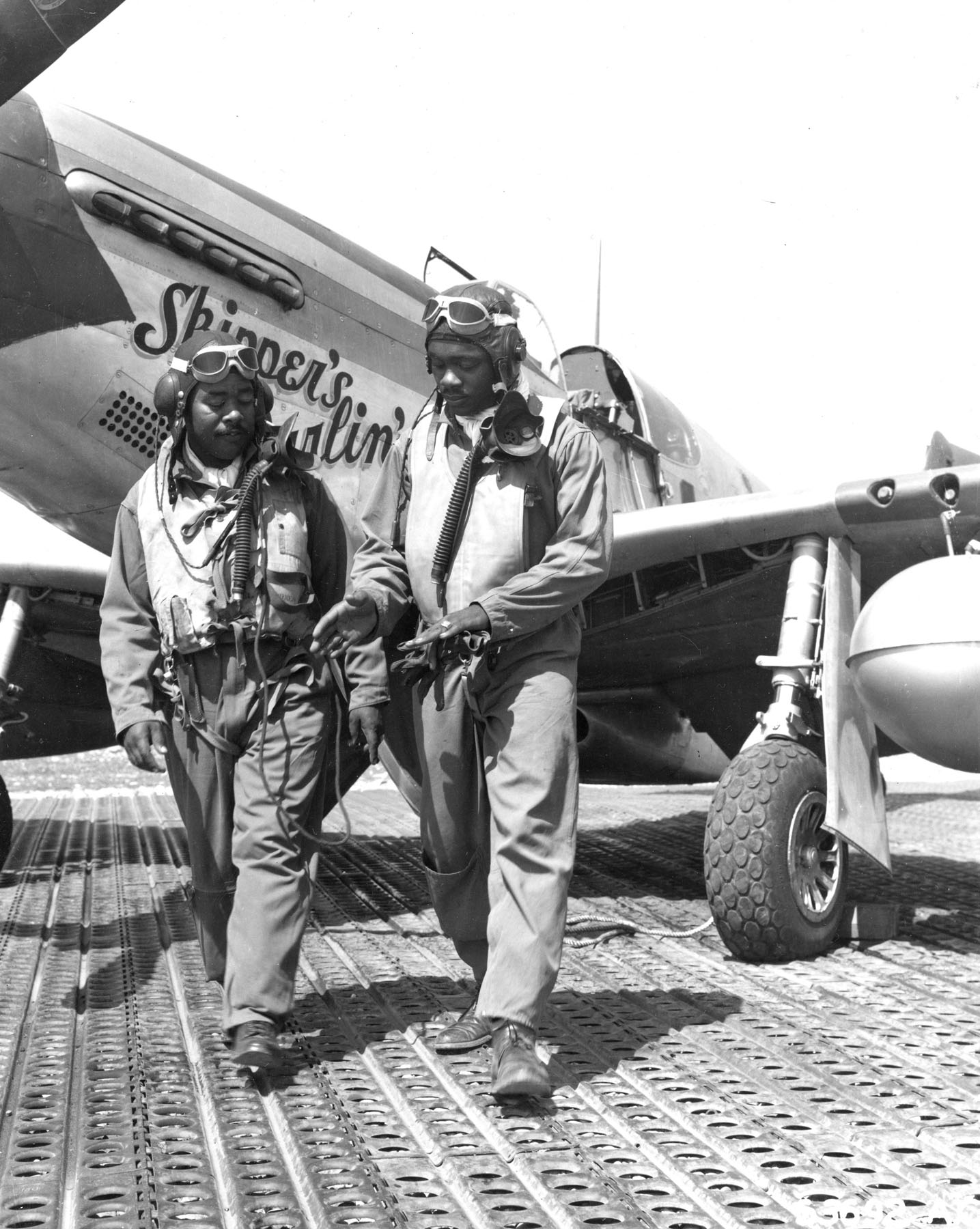
Members of the 332nd Fighter Group (the Tuskegee Airmen) of the United States Army Air Forces discuss combat flying while walking on Marston matting.

Pierced steel planking (or pressed steel planking, named after the manufacturing process) consisted of steel strips with rows of punched lightening holes, and a formation of U-shaped channels between the holes. Hooks were formed along one long edge and slots along the other long edge so that adjacent mats could be connected. The short edges were cut straight with no holes or hooks. The mats were laid in a staggered pattern to achieve lengthwise interlocking.

The hooks were usually held in the slots by a steel clip that filled the part of the slot that is empty when the adjacent sheets are properly engaged. The holes were bent up at their edges so that the beveled edge stiffened the area around the hole. In some mats a T-shaped stake could be driven at intervals through the holes to keep the assembly in place on the ground. Sometimes the sheets were welded together.

A typical later PSP was the M8 landing mat. A single piece weighed about 66 pounds (30 kg) and was 10 ft (3.0 m) long by 15 in (0.38 m) wide. The hole pattern for the sheet reduced the weight by a third, facilitating air transport. A lighter-weight aluminum plank version was developed, to ease logistics in the construction of airfields in less accessible areas. This was known as pierced aluminum planking, or PAP. PAP was and is not as common as PSP, as aluminum was a controlled strategic material during World War II; it was typically able to handle only half as many loading cycles as steel, and its high scrap value and short usable life led to recycling rather than reuse.

== History ==
=== World War II ===
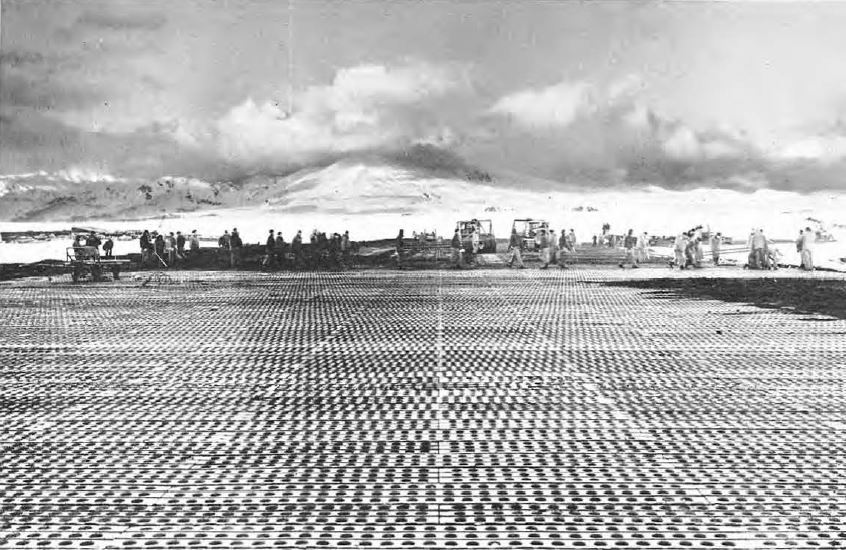
Marston mat laid by CB 45 on the Navy's auxiliary field on Tanaga Island in the Aleutian Islands

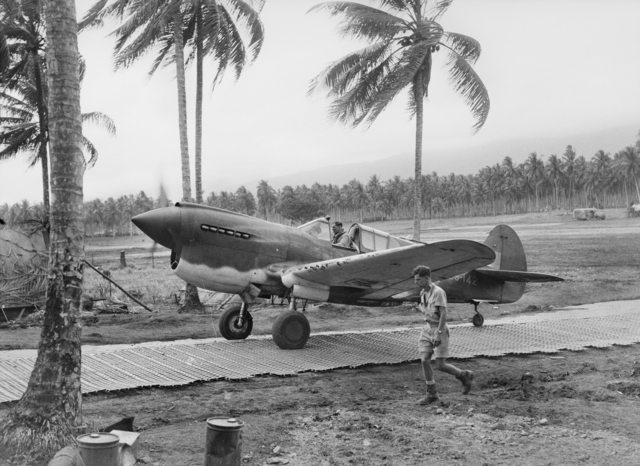
A Curtiss P-40 Kittyhawk of the Royal Australian Air Force taxiing along Marston Mat at Milne Bay in the Territory of Papua on the island of New Guinea in September 1942

In 1939, the United States Army Air Corps (USAAC) began exploring the use of runway mats for the construction of unimproved airfields. Systems for this purpose had already been tested by Britain, which used a material similar to heavy duty chicken wire, and France, using a grid of steel chevrons. The design directive for what would become the Marston mat was officially assigned to the Army Corps of Engineers on December 11, 1939. Development of landing mats in the United States began in December 1939 at Langley Field. The responsibility for development was shifted to the Engineer Board at Fort Belvoir in May 1940. Gerald G. Greulich of the Carnegie Steel Company also contributed to the design efforts. Early versions tested during the summer of 1940 were solid (non-perforated), ribbed steel. The design was modified during the winter of 1940-1941 with the distinctive punched holes used in the production version.

The first practical use of the Marston mat was during the Carolina Maneuvers, a series of United States Army exercises held in November 1941. A 3,000-by-150-foot (914 by 46 m) airstrip was constructed of the material near Camp Mackall in the area of Marston, North Carolina, in 11 days. It was visited by General Henry H. Arnold, then Chief of the Army Air Corps, who called it "the year’s greatest achievement in aviation warfare." The airstrip was dismantled immediately after the exercises and the component mats moved by rail to Langley Field.

Marston Mat was extensively used during World War II by Army engineers and Seabees ("CBs"; Construction Battalions) to build runways and other readily usable surfaces over all kinds of terrain. An early in-theater use of PSP was in constructing a 5,000-foot (1,500 m) runway on 'Bluie West One' (BW-1), an Allied Ferry Command and USAAC airfield located on the extreme southwest corner of Greenland, at the termination of Eriksfjord, and near the coastal community of Narsarsuaq. Construction began in early fall 1941, and the first aircraft landed on January 24, 1942. Deemed a success, Marston Mat was then used extensively in the Pacific theater of operations. On Pacific islands the matting was typically covered with crushed and rolled coral or soil to form a level surface. The perforated and channeled design of the matting created strength and rigidity and facilitated drainage. A runway 200 feet (61 m) wide and 5,000 feet (1,500 m) long could be created within two days by a small team of engineers.

Elsewhere, a Douglas C-47 Skytrain was the first aircraft to land on the first steel-mat runway constructed in France after the invasion of Normandy.

=== Berlin Airlift ===
At the start of the Berlin Airlift the runways at Tempelhof Airport in the US Zone of Berlin were made of PSP. Designed to support fighters and smaller cargo aircraft, the Douglas C-54 Skymaster that formed the backbone of the U.S. effort was too heavy for the PSP. Berliners were hired to fix the runway between the three-minute arrivals, running onto the runways with bags of sand to dump onto the mats and soften the surface.

=== Vietnam era ===
With the deployment of jet aircraft and helicopters, foreign object damage (FOD) became a larger hazard. In moist tropical areas, such as Vietnam, vegetation growing through the mats became an issue. Jet blast or rotor downdraft could dislodge loose material on the ground, which might be sucked into jet inlets, and vegetation required mowing or herbicides. The M8A1 mat was developed to prevent this, omitting the pierced holes that exposed the soil beneath. This mat has a solid surface, strengthened by corrugations that also encouraged the drainage of rainwater. The mat size also changed to be 22 by 144 inches (560 mm × 3,660 mm).

In order to support heavier aircraft, the Corps of Engineers developed the XM-19, a square mat constructed of aluminum. This mat was a lightweight, hollow design weighing 68 pounds (31 kg). The mats included an internal aluminum honeycomb structure, which increased the carrying capacity while remaining lightweight. The outer surface of the mat had an anti-skid coating.

In the mid-1960s, the AM2 mat was developed, using the lightweight aluminum honeycomb core construction of the XM-19, but in a rectangular size similar to earlier mat designs. The AM2 measures 24 by 144 inches (610 mm × 3,660 mm). Versions of the AM2 are still in use with the United States military.

Landing mats of all types were widely used for construction of bunker roofs and for reinforcing field fortifications, as well as service roads inside fire support bases.

=== Legacy ===
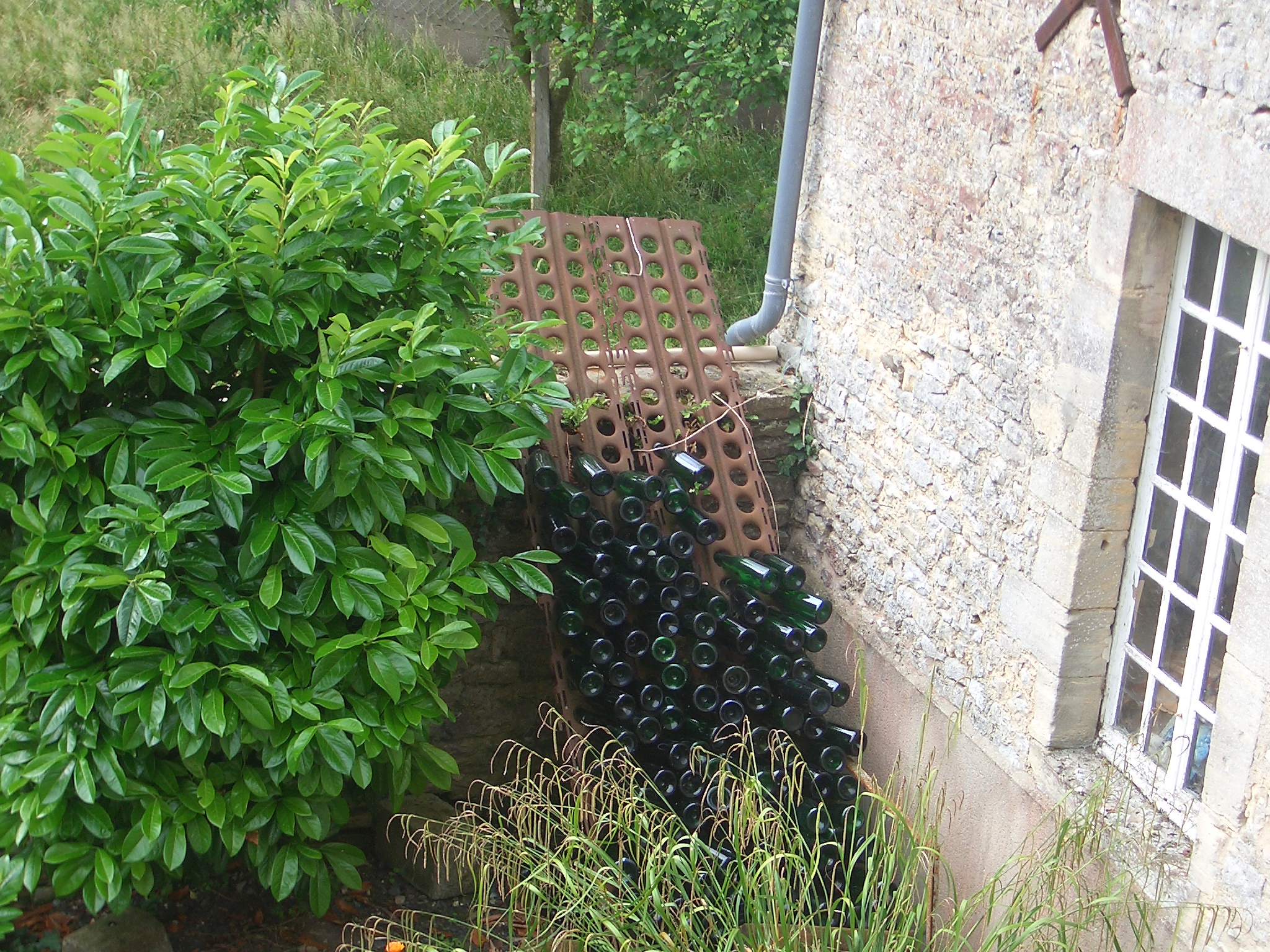
Marston Mat repurposed for storage of empty bottles on a farm in Normandy in 2007. Hooks and slots along long edges clearly visible

A huge quantity of Marston matting was left in the Philippines by the U.S. forces after World War II. Many of these were re-purposed as fencing material in housing projects that were built after the war. This one, behind the little boy, is located in a housing development in the 1950s that was initially referred to as "Project One", but later came to be known as Kamuning, Quezon City, near Manila. Photo is dated May 1965.

Large quantities of matting were produced; approximately 2 million tons costing more than US$200 million in the 1940s. At the end of the war a large amount of the material remained as war surplus and was pressed into use in various civil engineering applications such as road and bridge construction. As it was made from steel with a high manganese content, the matting was also highly resistant to corrosion. In various countries in the Pacific Theater, particularly in the Philippines and Papua New Guinea, matting still remains in use as fencing or roadway barriers, in some cases stretching for miles.

After the war, PSP was used by many southeastern U.S. auto racers (including NASCAR teams) to construct trailers. It was a readily available material for this purpose since it was manufactured in the area and could be found at many abandoned military airfields.

Surplus sections of Vietnam War-era mats were used to construct fences along the U.S.-Mexico border in the 1990s.

== See also ==
- Sommerfeld tracking – a form of wire matting
- Corduroy road – a road-building method going back to prehistory.
- Sedes Air Base – an airport in Greece using a PSP Metal Mesh Runway.
