= Catawba Valley Railway =

Overview
- Locale: South Carolina
- Dates of operation: 1906–1909
- Successor: Seaboard Air Line Railroad

Technical
- Track gauge: 1,435 mm (4 ft 8 1/2 in) (standard gauge)
- Length: 22.2 miles (35.7 km)

The Catawba Valley Railway was a shortline railway that operated in northern South Carolina in the early 20th century. The 22-mile route was begun by the Southern Power Company (later Duke Power), which built about 10 miles of track from Great Falls, South Carolina, to Fort Lawn, South Carolina, in 1906. The road was taken over by the Catawba Valley Railway Company in 1907 and extended another 12 miles northward to meet the Seaboard Air Line Railroad's Abbeville Subdivision near Catawba, South Carolina.

The Seaboard Air Line Railroad controlled the Catawba Valley Railway until it purchased the Catawaba Valley in 1909. The Seaboard Air Line operated the line as their Catawba Subdivision. In 1967, the Seaboard Air Line merged with its rival, the Atlantic Coast Line Railroad, and the combined company was named the Seaboard Coast Line Railroad. The line was abandoned and removed in 1980.

== Historic stations ==
Milepost	City/Location	Station	Connections and notes
SGA 330.5	Catawba	Catawba	junction with Seaboard Air Line Railroad Abbeville Subdivision
SGA 335.4		Rowell	
SGA 337.0		Landsford	
SGA 342.7	Fort Lawn	Fort Lawn	junction with Lancaster and Chester Railroad
SGA 348.8		Nitrolee	
SGA 352.7	Great Falls	Great Falls	
