= Aberdeen Subdivision =

Railway line in North Carolina

The Aberdeen Subdivision is a railroad line owned by CSX Transportation in North Carolina. The line runs along CSX's S Line from Raleigh, North Carolina, to Marston, North Carolina, for a total of 86.9 miles. At its north end it continues south from the Norlina Subdivision and at its south end it continues south as the Hamlet Terminal Subdivision.

The Aberdeen Subdivision hosts both CSX freight trains and Amtrak passenger trains. The line has passenger stations in Southern Pines and Cary. Passenger trains also serve Raleigh Union Station at the north end of the line though the station's platform is just east of the Aberdeen Subdivision on Norfolk Southern's H Line (which passenger trains take east to CSX's A Line in Selma).

== History ==
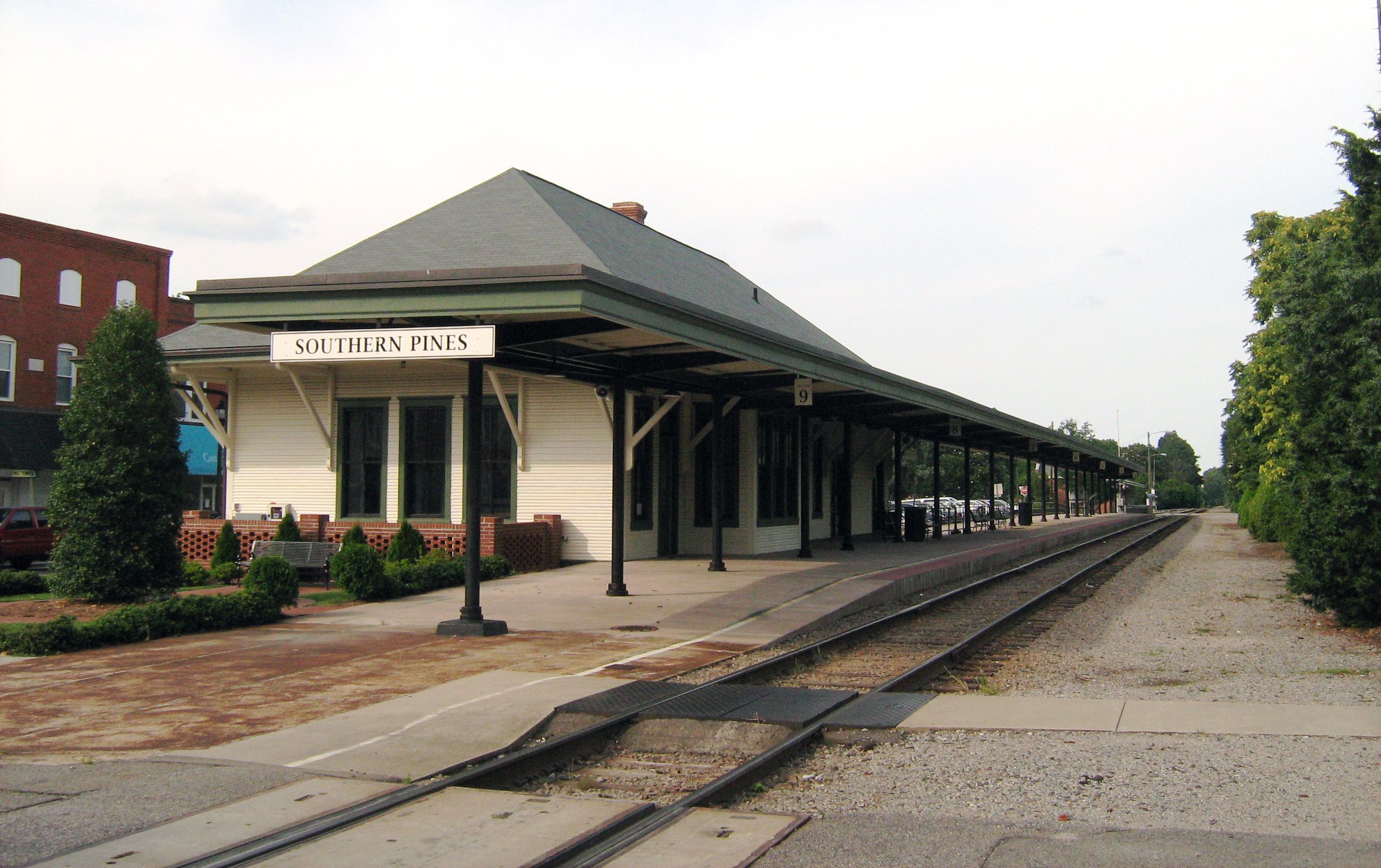
Southern Pines station along the Aberdeen Subdivision, which was built in 1898 by the Raleigh and Augusta Air Line Railroad.

The Aberdeen Subdivision was originally built by the Raleigh and Augusta Air Line Railroad, which began operation in 1877. The Raleigh and Augusta Air Line Railroad was merged into the Seaboard Air Line Railroad in 1901, and became part of its main line. Seaboard designated the main line from Raleigh to Hamlet as the Raleigh Subdivision.

In 1967, the SAL merged with its rival, the Atlantic Coast Line Railroad (ACL). The merged company was named the Seaboard Coast Line Railroad (SCL). After the merger, the ex-SAL main line became known as the S Line in the combined network. The Seaboard Coast Line renamed the Raleigh to Hamlet segment of the S Line as the Aberdeen Subdivision. In 1980, the Seaboard Coast Line's parent company merged with the Chessie System, creating the CSX Corporation. The CSX Corporation initially operated the Chessie and Seaboard Systems separately until 1986, when they were merged into CSX Transportation.

== See also ==
- List of CSX Transportation lines
