= Burlington station (North Carolina) =

Amtrak train station in North Carolina, US

Burlington, NC
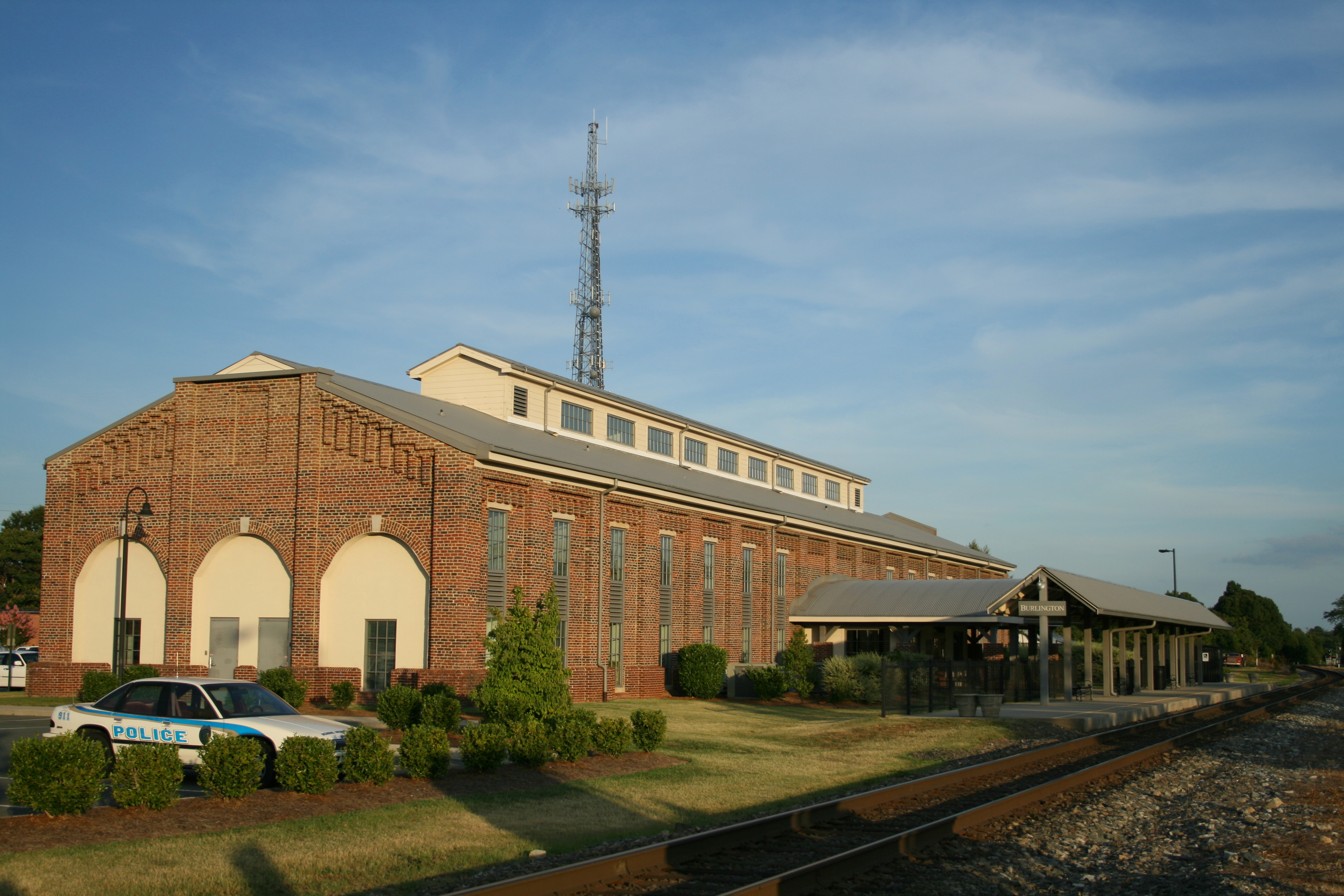

General information
- Location: 101 North Main Street; Burlington, North Carolina; United States
- Coordinates: 36°05′42″N 79°26′07″W
- Owner: North Carolina Railroad
- Line: NCRR Corridor
- Platforms: 1 side platform
- Tracks: 1
- Connections: Link: Purple

Construction
- Structure type: At-grade
- Parking: 25 spaces

Other information
- Status: Unstaffed; attendant available
- Station code: Amtrak: BNC

History
- Opened: 2003

Passengers
- FY 2025: 32,695 (Amtrak)

Services
Preceding station	Amtrak	Following station
Greensboro toward Charlotte	Carolinian	Durham toward New York
Greensboro toward Charlotte	Piedmont	Durham toward Raleigh
Location

Burlington station is a train station in Burlington, North Carolina. It is served by Amtrak, the United States' passenger rail system, and hosts two Amtrak trains, the Carolinian and Piedmont. The street address is 101 North Main Street, in the heart of downtown Burlington.

== History ==
The present depot was once the site of a large locomotive repair shop facility during the mid-19th century for the North Carolina Railroad. On this site was a camp of recruitment and instruction for the 6th North Carolina Troops during the American Civil War. In July 1861, these troops left Company Shops to ride by rail to the Battle of Manassas, Virginia. This was the first time in American history that military personnel were transported by rail into combat.

In 1895, the property was acquired by the Southern Railway, along with the rest of NCRR. It was restored as a railroad station in 2003. Prior to this period, trains stopped at a prefabricated office trailer, and before this a former Southern Railway station that was moved to another part of Burlington in order to make way for a road improvement project.

A small museum in the lobby of the station depicts the railroad history of company shops and their progression into the city of Burlington.
