= Laurens Railroad =

The Laurens Railroad was a 5 ft (1,524 mm) gauge shortline railroad started in 1854 that served the South Carolina Upstate region before, during, and after the Civil War. By 1861, the 32-mile line was carrying 8,500 passengers a day, and by 1881 it had been reorganized and was operating as the Laurens Railway. It survived under that named until it was bought by the Columbia, Newberry and Laurens Railroad in 1894.

Among the line's presidents was Henry William Garlington (1811-1893), a planter who signed the South Carolina Ordinance of Secession in 1860.
