= Columbia, Newberry and Laurens Railroad =

Former railroad in South Carolina, United States

The Columbia, Newberry and Laurens Railroad (reporting mark CNL) was a 75-mile (121 km) railroad line between Columbia and Laurens.

A ticket for a passenger service on the Columbia, S.C., Newberry and Laurens Railroad, date unknown.

In 1885, the South Carolina General Assembly issued a charter for the Columbia, Newberry and Laurens Railroad, and the line was officially christened on Christmas Day 1885. In 1890, work began on the track and by July 1891, the line was complete from Columbia through Newberry to Dover Junction, nearly 65 miles (105 km) north of the state capital. In 1896, the Laurens Railroad was purchased from the Richmond & Danville Railroad to complete the line to Laurens.

The first locomotive of the CN&L was built in 1887 and sold in 1922. The CN&L ran daily passenger trains from Union Station in Columbia to Laurens, always pulled by steam until the early 1930s, when it switched to its own station in Columbia at 630 Gervais Street. Passenger service was discontinued in 1952.

The railroad saw to the creation of towns along its line. Towns such as Irmo, Chapin, Little Mountain, Prosperity and Joanna owe their existence in part to their locations along the CN&L.

In 1924 the Atlantic Coast Line Railroad acquired control of the line. It became part of the CSX Transportation system in 1984.

== CN&L Subdivision ==
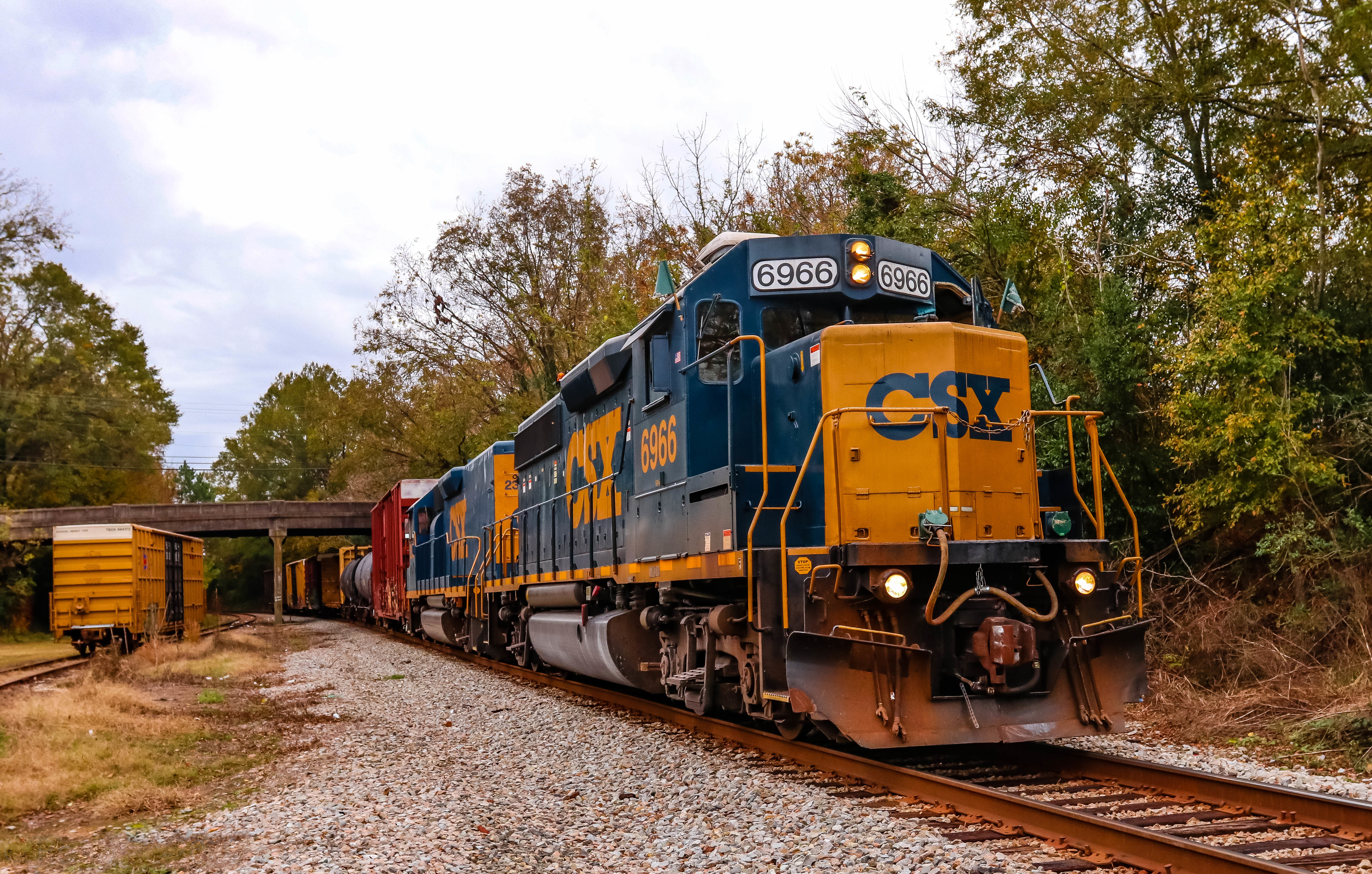
A CSX "Newberry Switcher" on the CN&L Subdivision in Newberry, South Carolina

The CN&L Subdivision is a modern railroad line owned and operated by CSX Transportation that runs along the former CNL. The line runs from Columbia northwest to north of Laurens.

At its southeast end, the CN&L connects to the Hamlet Subdivision, Eastover Subdivision, and Columbia Subdivision. It has a gap near Clinton, where it uses the Monroe Subdivision, and ends at the Spartanburg Subdivision north of Laurens. The CN&L connection track north of Laurens opened in late July 1996, allowing CSX to easily route Florida-bound trains around downtown Laurens and onto the CN&L.
