= Wake Forest station =

Future train station in North Carolina, U.S.

Wake Forest, NC

General information
- Location: 120 South White Street; Wake Forest, North Carolina; United States
- Coordinates: 35.9785°N 78.5098°W
- Owner: Town of Wake Forest
- Line: S-Line (Norlina Subdivision)
Future services
Preceding station	Amtrak	Following station
Raleigh toward Charlotte	Piedmont	Terminus
Location

Wake Forest station is a planned train station in Wake Forest, North Carolina, located on the S-Line (Norlina Subdivision) and Southeast High Speed Rail Corridor (SEHSR). When it is completed, Amtrak's Piedmont will serve the station.

== History ==
On September 19, 2023, the town of Wake Forest proposed the new station to be located at the former site of the Seaboard freight station in the center of town and pledged $3.3 million in matching funds towards its construction. However, the North Carolina Department of Transportation (NCDOT) cautioned that the engineering work has yet to be done to determine if the station will fit at the proposed location.

In December 2023, NCDOT was awarded nearly $1.09 billion in Federal Railroad Administration grants that will be used to upgrade the S-Line between Raleigh and Wake Forest. With construction along the line to begin in 2024, NCDOT has a tentative completion date of 2030, which includes the station.
