= Columbia Subdivision =

Railroad line in South Carolina and Georgia, US

The Columbia Subdivision is a railroad line owned by CSX Transportation in South Carolina and Georgia. The line runs along CSX's S Line from Columbia, South Carolina, to Savannah, Georgia, for a total of 137.9 miles (221.9 km). At its north end it continues south from the Hamlet Subdivision and at its south end it continues south as the Savannah Subdivision of the Jacksonville Division.

== Operation ==
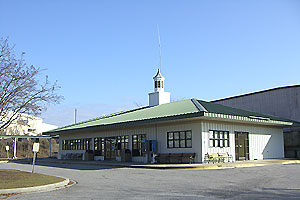
Columbia Amtrak station at the north end of the Columbia Subdivision

The Columbia Subdivision runs along CSX's S Line, the former SAL passenger main line. In addition to CSX freight service, the line also hosts Amtrak's Silver Star (Amtrak train), which stops in Columbia and Denmark.

== History ==
The Columbia Subdivision was originally built by the South Bound Railroad which opened in 1891. Two years later, the South Bound Railroad was leased by the Florida Central and Peninsular Railroad, which operated a vast railroad network in Florida and southern Georgia.

After leasing the South Bound Railroad, the FC&P would extend its Northern Division to Savannah to connect with the South Bound Railroad and making a continuous route from Columbia to Jacksonville. This extension opened in 1894. The line would be extended north to Camden, South Carolina by the end of the decade (this extension is now part of the Hamlet Subdivision).

The line would become part of the main line of the Seaboard Air Line Railroad in 1900, after they bought the Florida Central and Peninsular Railroad. The Seaboard Air Line designated the line as the Columbia Subdivision, which it is still known as today. Through various mergers, the company became CSX Transportation by 1986. The line continues to be part of CSX's S Line (the designation given to the former Seaboard main line).

== See also ==
- List of CSX Transportation lines
