= Depot Historic District (Raleigh, North Carolina) =

Historic district in North Carolina, United States

- U.S. National Register of Historic Places
- U.S. Historic district
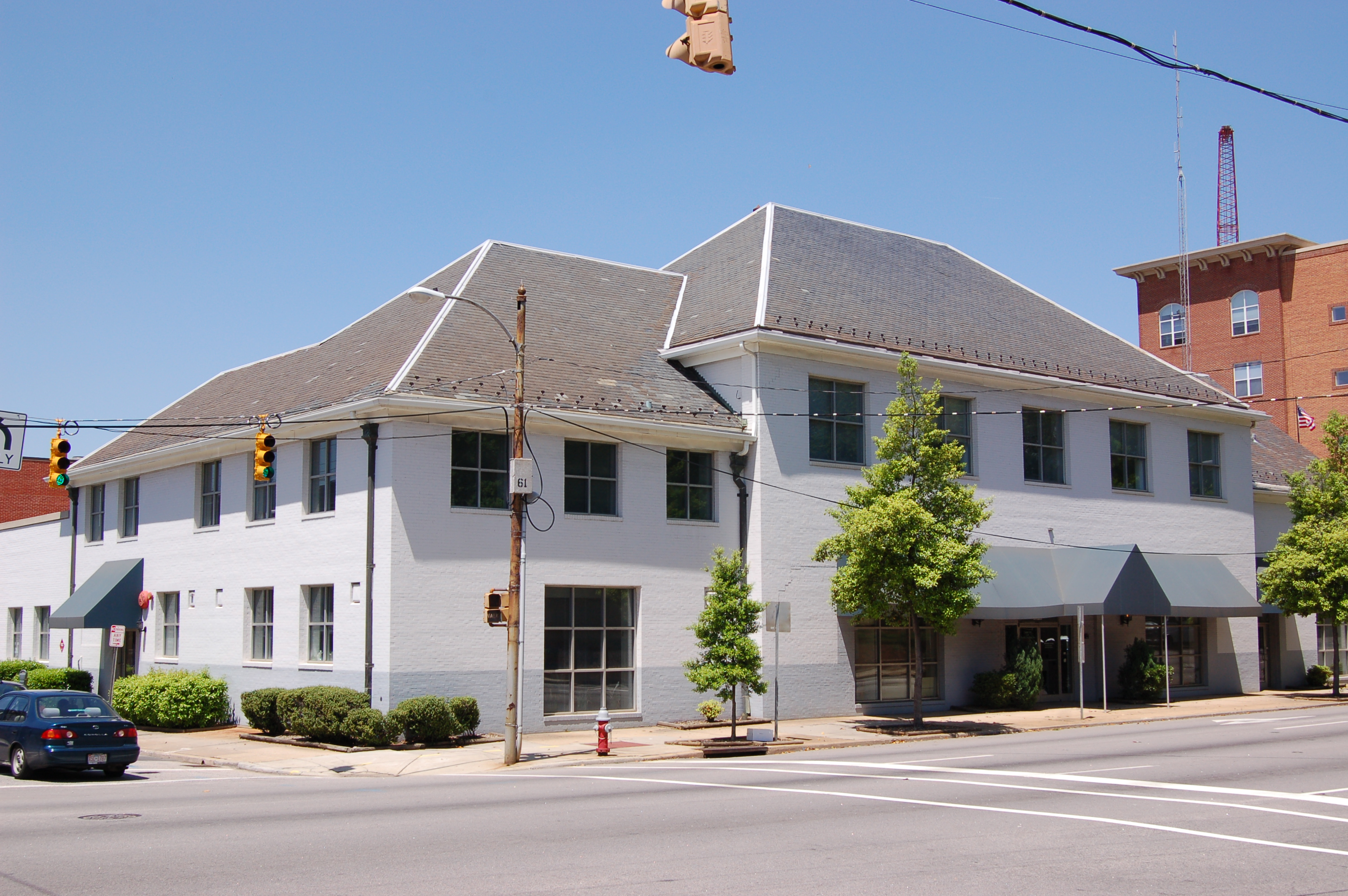
- Former Union Depot in Raleigh's Depot Historic District

- Location within North Carolina Location within the United States
- Location: Bounded by W. Hargett, S. McDowell, S. Dawson, and W. Cabarrus St., Raleigh, North Carolina
- Coordinates: 35°46′42″N 78°38′38″W
- Area: 21 acres (8.5 ha)
- Built: 1891
- Architect: Milburn, Heister & Company; Fitzhugh Ricks
- Architectural style: Art Deco
- NRHP reference No.: 02000946 (original); 100001634 (increase)

Significant dates
- Added to NRHP: September 6, 2002
- Boundary increase: September 18, 2017

The Depot Historic District is an industrial and commercial neighborhood in downtown Raleigh, North Carolina that was the city's railroad and warehouse distribution hub from the 1850s to 1950s. Located two blocks west of Fayetteville Street and to the north and east of the Norfolk and Southern railroad tracks, the district contains four blocks of 35 brick buildings that date from the 1880s to early 1950s. The district encompasses the southwestern portion of Raleigh's original 1792 town plan and was listed on the National Register of Historic Places in 2002.

Nash Square, one of four parks in the city's original plan, is located on the northern edge of the Depot District. The square's Beaux-Arts walkways and gates offer a stark contrast to the surrounding industrialism. Raleigh's former Union Depot sits across from Nash Square. Eight railroad tracks are located in the southwest corner of the district. The Amtrak station and the Freight Depot sit on opposite sides of the tracks. Warehouse, factories, commercial buildings, and parking lots are located between Nash Square and the railroad tracks. The district boundaries include West Hargett, South McDowell, South Dawson, and West Cabarrus Streets.

== See also ==
- Contemporary Art Museum of Raleigh
- National Register of Historic Places in Wake County, North Carolina
- Raleigh Union Station
