= Bennettsville and Osborne Railroad =

The Bennettsville and Osborn Railroad was a railroad company that was incorporated to serve eastern South Carolina. The line was incorporated in February 1899 under a special act of the State of South Carolina as the Bennettsville and Osborne Railroad Company. Its name was changed in June 1902 to the Bennettsville and Cheraw Railroad Company.
