= Pittsboro Railroad =

Historic railroad in North Carolina

Overview
- Locale: North Carolina
- Dates of operation: 1885–1900
- Successor: Seaboard Air Line Railroad; Seaboard Coast Line Railroad

Technical
- Track gauge: 4 ft 8 1/2 in (1,435 mm) standard gauge

The Pittsboro Railroad was a railroad that historically ran from Moncure, North Carolina to Pittsboro, North Carolina, a distance of about 10.5 miles. The line became part of the Seaboard Air Line Railroad and operated as the company's Pittsboro Subdivision.

== History ==
The Pittsboro Railroad was first chartered in 1885 and construction began on November 16, 1885. About $15,000 were raised for the construction of the line by township bonds and local citizens. The line was completed a year later and its first passenger train operated on December 20, 1886. The Pittsboro Railroad was subsequently leased to the Raleigh and Augusta Air Line Railroad, which the Pittsboro Railroad connected with in Moncure, North Carolina. The Raleigh and Gaston Railroad then operated the Pittsboro Railroad as a branch line.

The Raleigh and Augusta Air Line Railroad was absorbed into the Seaboard Air Line Railway in 1900, and the Pittsboro Railroad was fully merged into the company as well. The Seaboard designated the line as their Pittsboro Subdivision. By 1955, only freight service was operating on the line with a road switcher running the line six days a week. The road switcher ran took about 40 minutes to run from Moncure to Pittsboro.

In 1967, the Seaboard Air Line merged with its rival, the Atlantic Coast Line Railroad (ACL). The merged company was named the Seaboard Coast Line Railroad (SCL). The Seaboard Coast Line continued to operate the Pittsboro Subdivision until it was abandoned in the 1980s. An overpass that carried the line over US 1 in Moncure still stands abandoned just east of the Moncure-Pittsboro Road interchange (Exit 79).

== Historic stations ==
Milepost	City/Location	Station	Connections and notes
SD 187.3		Moncure	junction with Seaboard Air Line Railroad Main Line
SD 191.5		Womble	
SD 198.3	Pittsboro	Pittsboro	
