= Houston, North Carolina =

- Unincorporated community
- Location within North Carolina
- Coordinates: 34°57′27″N 80°37′41″W
- Country: United States
- State: North Carolina
- County: Union
- Elevation: 659 ft (201 m)
- Time zone: UTC-5 (EST)
  - Summer (DST): UTC-4 (EDT)
- Area code: 704
- GNIS feature ID: 987173

Houston is an unincorporated community in Union County, North Carolina, United States.
