= Denmark station =

Amtrak station in South Carolina, US

Denmark, SC
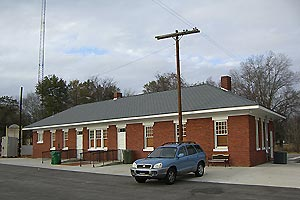
- The station building in 2007 post-renovation.

General information
- Location: 200 West Baruch Street; Denmark, South Carolina; United States
- Coordinates: 33.3262°N 81.1436°W
- Owner: City of Denmark
- Line: Columbia Subdivision
- Platforms: 1 side platform
- Tracks: 1

Other information
- Status: Unstaffed
- Station code: Amtrak: DNK

History
- Opened: October 29, 1978 (Amtrak)

Passengers
- FY 2025: 2,858 (Amtrak)

Services
Preceding station	Amtrak	Following station
Savannah toward Miami	Floridian	Columbia toward Chicago
Former services
Preceding station	Amtrak	Following station
Savannah toward Miami	Silver Star until 2024	Columbia toward New York
Preceding station	Seaboard Air Line Railroad	Following station
Fairfax toward Tampa or Miami	Main Line	Dixiana toward Richmond
Preceding station	Southern Railway	Following station
Lee toward Augusta	Augusta – Charleston	Sato toward Charleston
Location

Denmark station is an Amtrak train station in Denmark, South Carolina. It is served by the daily Floridian.

The station was originally used by the Seaboard Air Line Railroad and the Southern Railway. Denmark was also served by the Atlantic Coast Line Railroad's Florence—Robbins Line, but not at this station. Service at the station ended by 1971, but Amtrak added Denmark as a stop for the Champion on October 29, 1978. It was added because there were no stop between Columbia, South Carolina, and Savannah, Georgia, although Denmark and the surrounding area had no sizable population. After the Champion was discontinued, the Silver Star began stopping instead. On November 10, 2024, the Silver Star was merged with the Capitol Limited as the Floridian.
