= Hamlet Subdivision =

Railway line in North Carolina and South Carolina

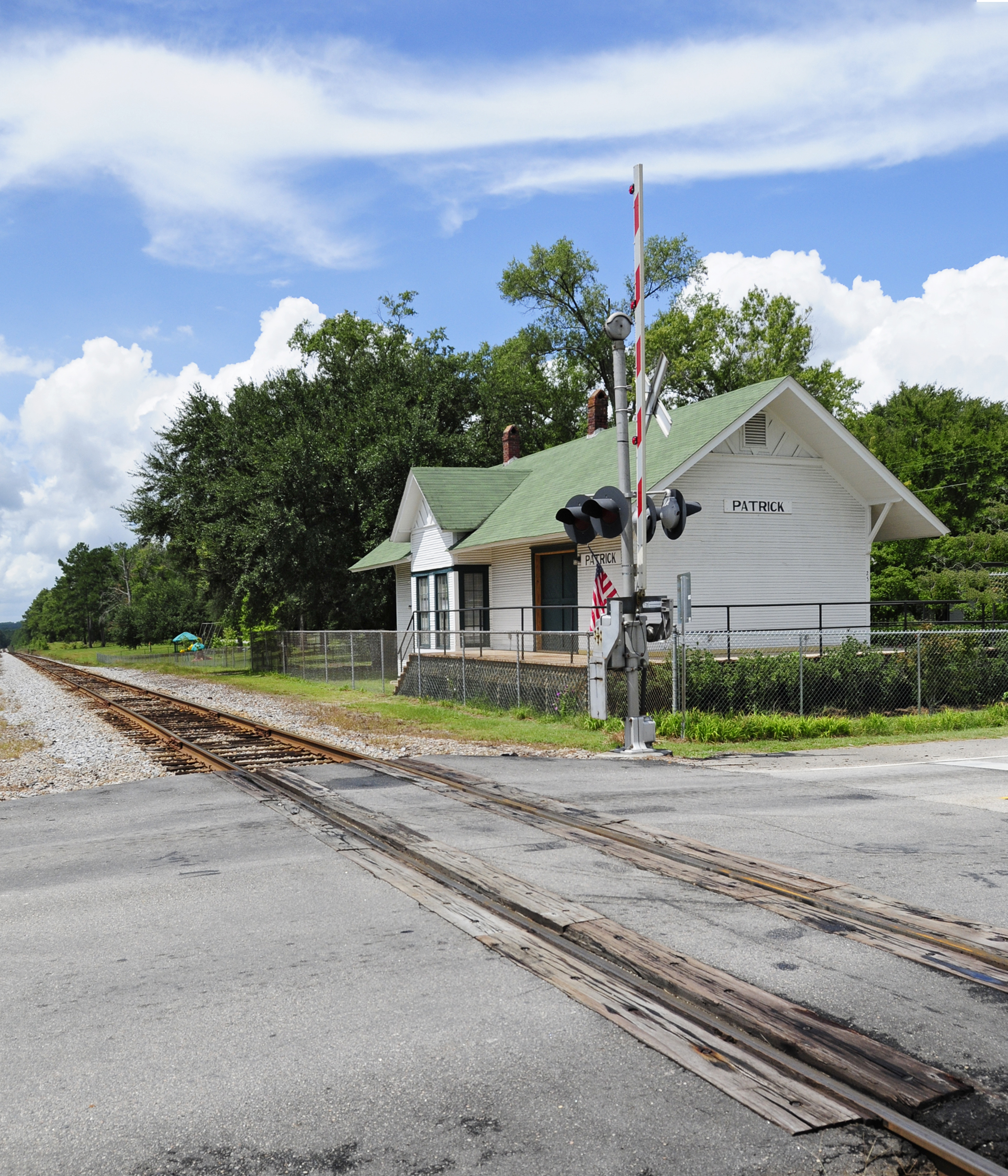
Historic Seaboard Air Line Railway Depot in Patrick on the Hamlet Subdivision

The Hamlet Subdivision is a railroad line owned by CSX Transportation in North Carolina and South Carolina. The line runs from Hamlet, North Carolina, to Columbia, South Carolina, for a total of 105.2 miles. At its north end it continues south from the Hamlet Terminal Subdivision and at its south end it continues south as the Columbia Subdivision.

The Hamlet Subdivision runs along CSX's S Line. The line notably carries Amtrak's Silver Star which travels from New York to Florida.

== History ==
From Columbia north to Camden, the line was built by the Florida Central and Peninsular Railroad as an extension of the South Bound Railroad in the late 1890s.

From Camden to Cheraw, the line was built by the Chesterfield and Kershaw Railroad, which was chartered by the South Carolina General Assembly in 1899.

From Cheraw to Hamlet, the line was built by the Palmetto Railroad, which was completed in 1887.

The Florida Central and Peninsular Railroad, the Chesterfield and Kershaw Railroad, and the Palmetto Railroad all became part of the Seaboard Air Line Railroad in 1900. The unified line became a segment of the Seaboard main line. The Seaboard Air Line designated this segment of the main line as the Hamlet Subdivision, which it is still known as today. Seaboard would eventually become CSX by the 1980s.

== See also ==
- List of CSX Transportation lines
