= West Gervais Street Historic District =

Historic district in South Carolina, United States

- U.S. National Register of Historic Places
- U.S. Historic district
- Location within South Carolina Location within the United States
- Location: Roughly bounded by Gadsen, Senate, Park, and Lady Sts., Columbia, South Carolina
- Coordinates: 33°59′56″N 81°02′21″W
- Area: 23.2 acres (9.4 ha)
- MPS: Columbia MRA
- NRHP reference No.: 83002206
- Added to NRHP: April 27, 1983

West Gervais Street Historic District is a national historic district located at Columbia, South Carolina. The district encompasses 40 contributing buildings in a commercial, warehouse, and light industrial section of Columbia. They date from about 1846 to the 1930s. Notable buildings include the W. H. Gibbes Machinery Co. and Carriage Works, Seaboard Air Line Railroad Passenger Depot, and Seaboard Air Line Railroad Baggage Room.

It was added to the National Register of Historic Places in 1983.
