= Gloster, Georgia =

Unincorporated community in Georgia, U.S.

Coordinates: 33°54′35″N 84°03′55″W

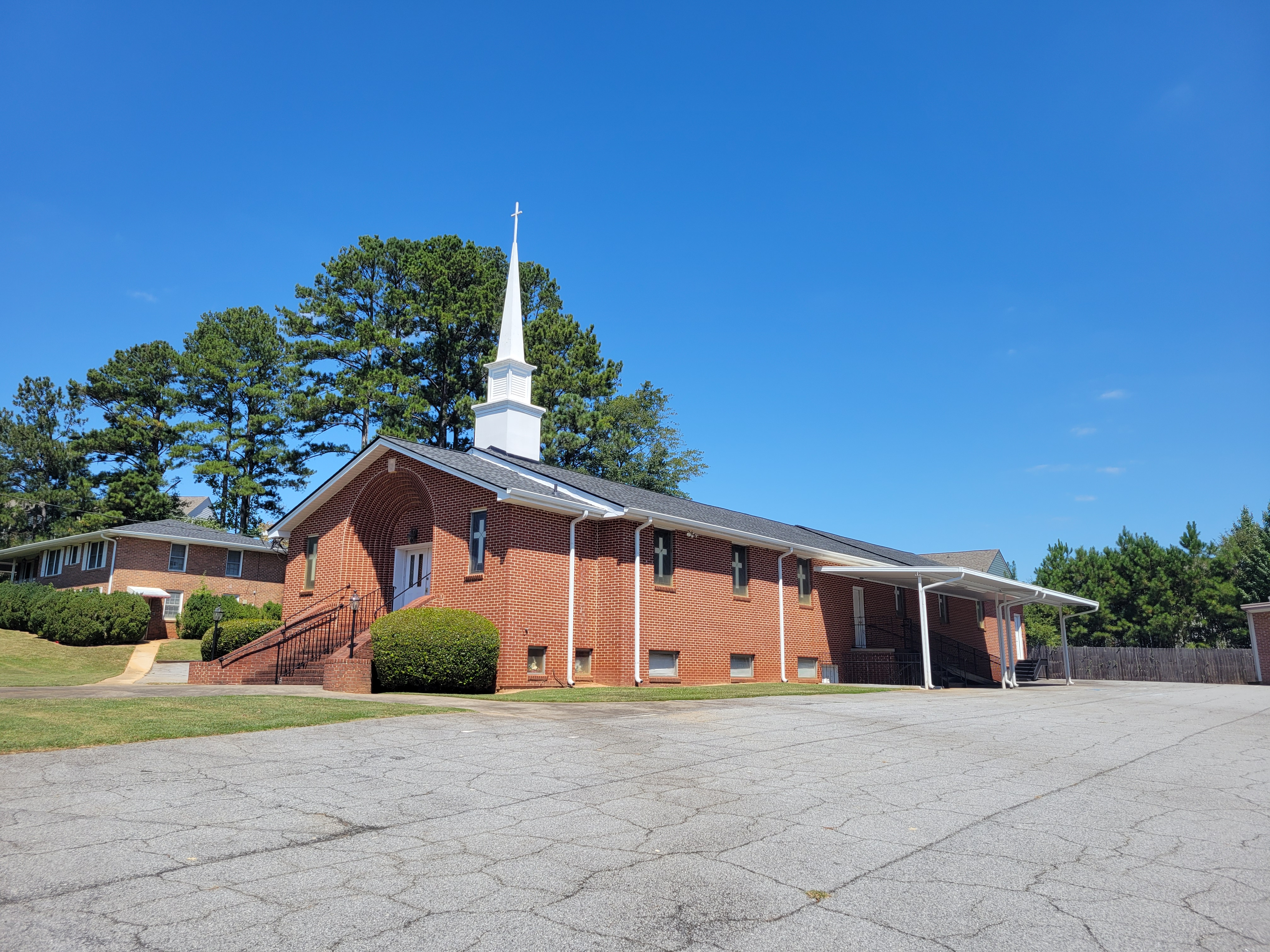
Gloster Baptist Church

Gloster is an unincorporated community in Gwinnett County, in the U.S. state of Georgia.

== History ==
A post office named Glouster was established in 1892, and remained in operation until 1946. The community was named after a railroad worker.
