= Monroe Subdivision =

Railway line in North Carolina and South Carolina

The Monroe Subdivision is a railroad line owned by CSX Transportation in the U.S. states of North Carolina and South Carolina. The line runs from Pee Dee, North Carolina to Abbeville, South Carolina, for a total of 177 miles. The full line is dispatched by Centralized traffic control.

== Route Description ==
The Monroe Subdivision beings at the Hamlet Terminal Subdivision in Pee Dee, North Carolina (just west of Hamlet, North Carolina). From Pee Dee, it runs west largely paralleling U.S. Route 74 though Wadesboro to Monroe. At Monroe, the line splits with the Charlotte Subdivision continuing northwest, while the Monroe Subdivision continues southwest and crosses into South Carolina. In South Carolina, it passes through Catawba, Chester, and Clinton before coming to an end at Abbeville Yard in Abbeville, South Carolina, where it continues as the Abbeville Subdivision.

== History ==
The Monroe Subdivision from Pee Dee to Monroe was built in 1874 by the Carolina Central Railroad, the successor to the Wilmington, Charlotte and Rutherford Railroad. The line from Monroe to Abbeville was built from 1887 to 1892 by the Georgia, Carolina and Northern Railway.

By 1901, both the Carolina Central Railway and the Georgia, Carolina and Northern Railway became part of the Seaboard Air Line Railroad. The Seaboard Air Line designated the line as the Monroe Subdivision from Hamlet to Monroe and on to Rutherfordton, North Carolina. Track from Monroe to Abbeville was part of the Seaboard's Abbeville Subdivision. Seaboard's passenger trains historically ran the line on their way from the Northeast to Atlanta which included the Silver Comet, The Cherry Blossoms, and The Capitol.

In 1967, the Seaboard Air Line merged with its rival, the Atlantic Coast Line Railroad (ACL). The merged company was named the Seaboard Coast Line Railroad (SCL). Seaboard Coast Line continued operating the line as the Monroe Subdivision and Abbeville Subdivision.

In 1980, the Seaboard Coast Line's parent company merged with the Chessie System, creating the CSX Corporation. The CSX Corporation initially operated the Chessie and Seaboard Systems separately until 1986, when they were merged into CSX Transportation. CSX extended the Monroe Subdivision name from Monroe to Abbeville as it is today and truncated the Abbeville Subdivision to Abbeville. The former Monroe Subdivision west of Monroe towards Charlotte, North Carolina is now the Charlotte Subdivision.

== See also ==
- List of CSX Transportation lines
