= Cary station (North Carolina) =

Railroad station in North Carolina, US

Cary, NC
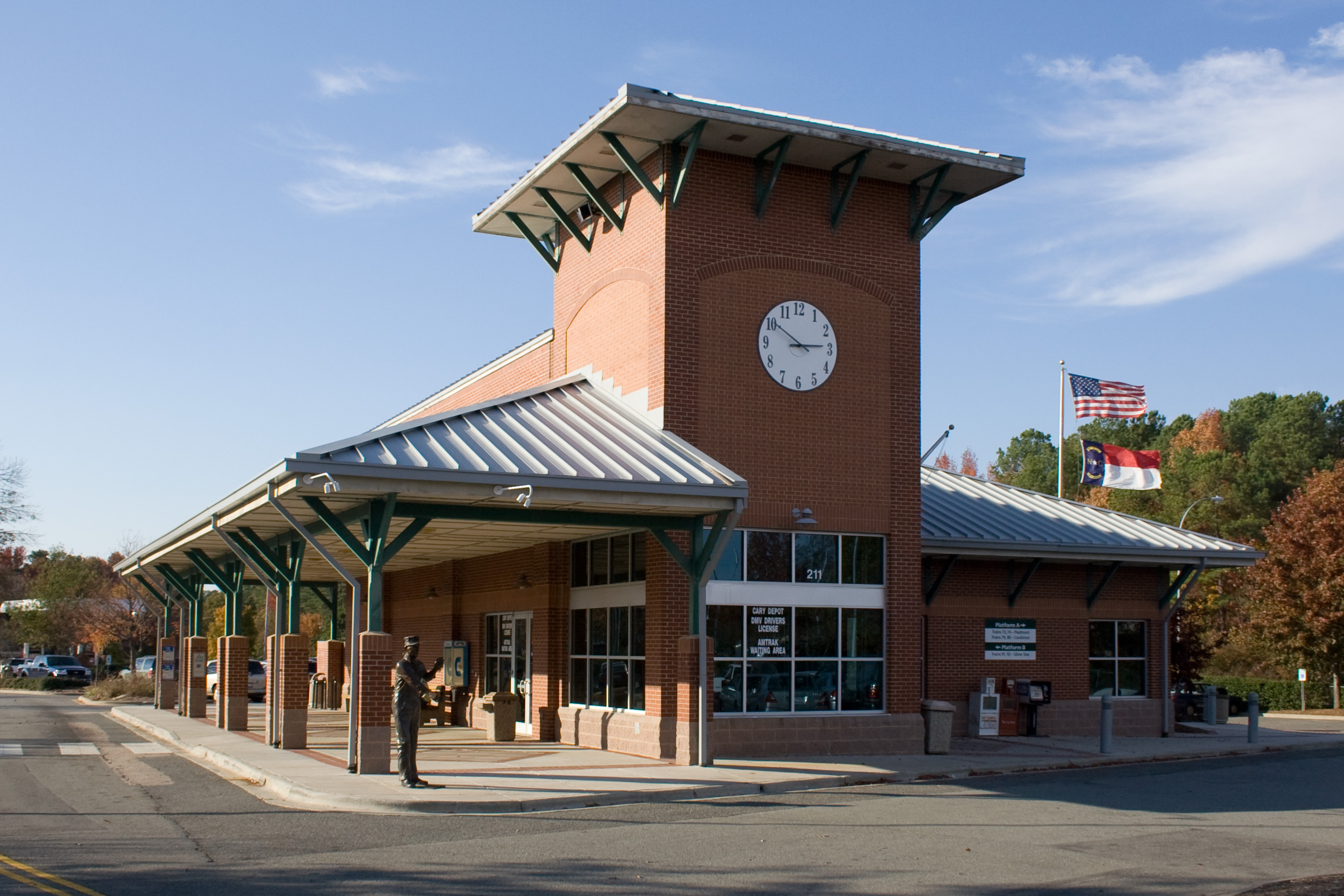
- Cary station in November 2007

General information
- Location: 211 North Academy Street; Cary, North Carolina; United States
- Coordinates: 35°47′19″N 78°46′53″W
- Owner: Town of Cary
- Lines: NCRR Corridor; Aberdeen Subdivision
- Platforms: 2 side platforms
- Tracks: 2
- Connections: GoCary: 1, 3, 4, 5, 6, 7, 8, ACX; GoTriangle: 300, 310

Construction
- Parking: 123 spaces
- Accessible: Yes

Other information
- Station code: Amtrak: CYN

History
- Opened: 1996
- Rebuilt: 2005, 2011

Passengers
- FY 2025: 133,942 (Amtrak)

Services
Preceding station	Amtrak	Following station
Durham toward Charlotte	Carolinian	Raleigh toward New York
Durham toward Charlotte	Carolinian	North Carolina State Fair (seasonal) toward New York
Durham toward Charlotte	Piedmont	Raleigh Terminus
Durham toward Charlotte	Piedmont	North Carolina State Fair (seasonal) toward Raleigh
Southern Pines toward Miami	Floridian	Raleigh toward Chicago
Former services
Preceding station	Amtrak	Following station
Southern Pines toward Miami	Silver Star until 2024	Raleigh toward New York
Location

Cary station is an Amtrak train station located in Cary, North Carolina. It is served by the Floridian, Carolinian, and Piedmont services. The station is the hub for the town's GoCary bus network.

== History ==
=== Previous station ===
The railroad came to Cary in 1854 with the arrival of the North Carolina Railroad. This is the northernmost track in Cary today, and it was originally built mostly by enslaved people. A second line for the Chatham Railroad was completed in 1868, creating a railroad crossing in Cary. Regular passenger service to Cary started in 1867. The Chatham Railroad constructed a passenger waiting room and warehouse in Cary by 1871. By the early 20th century, Cary residents used both railroads for daily trips to Raleigh for shopping. However, during the Great Depression, rail service was discontinued.

Cary station was demolished in about 1976. It had served the Southern Railway and the Seaboard Air Line. When Amtrak passenger service to Cary resumed in 1995, there was no longer a depot. This initial Amtrak service was an infill station on the Piedmont, a state-owned regional railroad operated by Amtrak and mostly financed by the North Carolina Department of Transportation.

=== Modern station ===
In 1996, the North Carolina Department of Transportation Rail Division erected a platform and shelter for the H Line, north of the station, at the cost of $100,000. This was just prior to the opening of the new Cary Station which cost $737,000—$637,000 from the town and $100,000 from the Triangle Transit Authority. The state-subsidized Carolinian, began serving the station in 1997, in addition to the Piedmont.

In 2006, the North Carolina Department of Transportation constructed a platform on the S Line, south of the station, which allowed the Silver Star (New York–Tampa–Miami) to begin service to Cary. The town contributed $30,000 or 10% of the project's cost. The station was expanded at the cost of $2 million in NCDOT and Federal Railroad Administration funds in 2010 and 2011. The station reopened on September 1, 2011, and featured a larger waiting room, restrooms, and a staffed ticket sales window with checked baggage service.

In June 2024, the station was a stop along the U.S. Open Express, which operated during the U.S. Open at course number 2 of Pinehurst Resort. On November 10, 2024, the Silver Star was merged with the Capitol Limited as the Floridian.
