= Chesterfield and Lancaster Railroad =

Railroad in South Carolina, US

The Chesterfield and Lancaster Railroad was a South Carolina railroad that operated in the late 19th century and first half of the 20th century.

The Chesterfield and Lancaster was chartered by the South Carolina General Assembly in 1887 but construction did not begin until 1900.

The 35-mile line extended from Cheraw, South Carolina, to Crowburk, South Carolina.

The Seaboard Air Line Railroad acquired control of the Chesterfield and Lancaster in 1913 when it purchased 60 percent of the line's stock. It bought the remainder 10 years later.

The line was abandoned in 1941.
