= Loganville and Lawrenceville Railroad =

19th century American railway company

Loganville & Lawrenceville Railroad
Overview
- Parent company: Georgia, Carolina and Northern Railway, Seaboard Air Line Railroad
- Reporting mark: L&L
- Locale: Gwinnett County, Georgia
- Dates of operation: 1898–1932
- Successor: Abandoned

Technical
- Track gauge: 4 ft 8 1/2 in (1,435 mm) standard gauge
- Length: 10.33 miles (16.62 km)

The Loganville and Lawrenceville Railroad (L&L) was founded in 1898 and operated a 10-mile (16 km) line between Loganville and Lawrenceville, Georgia, USA. It was owned by the Georgia, Carolina and Northern Railway which was incorporated into the Seaboard Air Line Railway on 1 July 1900. The L&L was completely abandoned on 17 January 1932. The tracks were removed in 1933.

The 10.33 mile run departed Loganville at 7:30am arriving at 8:10am, and depared again at 5:20pm arriving at 6pm. The return trips were from Lawrenceville 9:25am, arriving at 10:05, and departing 6:35pm arriving at 7:15pm. There was no turntable for the engine in Loganville, so it was turned around using a Y track.
