= Bennettsville and Cheraw Railroad =

The Bennettsville and Cheraw Railroad was a railroad that served eastern South Carolina in the first half of the 20th century.

The carrier was incorporated in February 1899 under special act of the State of South Carolina as the Bennettsville and Osborne Railroad Company. The name of the company was changed in June 1902 to the Bennettsville and Cheraw Railroad Company.

In 1902 and 1904 the company's charter was amended, authorizing the construction of a line from Cheraw to Bennettsville and south to a point on the Atlantic coast in South Carolina, rather than Osborne.

The line was headquartered in Bennettsville.
