= Marston, North Carolina =

- Unincorporated community
- Location within North Carolina Location within the United States
- Coordinates: 34°59′18″N 79°34′56″W
- Country: United States
- State: North Carolina
- County: Richmond
- Elevation: 423 ft (129 m)
- Time zone: UTC-5 (Eastern (EST))
  - Summer (DST): UTC-4 (EDT)
- ZIP code: 28363
- Area codes: 910, 472
- GNIS feature ID: 1021356

Marston is an unincorporated community in Richmond County, North Carolina, United States. The community is located on U.S. Route 1, 11.4 miles (18.3 km) east-northeast of Rockingham. Marston had its own post office until November 13, 2010; it still has its own ZIP code, 28363. Marston also gave its name to the pierced steel planks developed and deployed by the U.S. military in World War Two called ‘Marston mats’. During November, 1941 maneuvers near Marston, North Carolina, the 21st Engineer Regiment (Aviation) constructed a 3,000 foot runway in eleven days using eighteen railway carloads of 36,000 panels of pierced steel planking. Developed by the Carnegie Illinois Steel Company, the 10 foot by 15 inch steel panels, with 87 holes, weighed 66.2 pounds each, and could be emplaced without special tools, then lifted and moved to a new location.
