= Raleigh Union Station =

American intermodal transit station

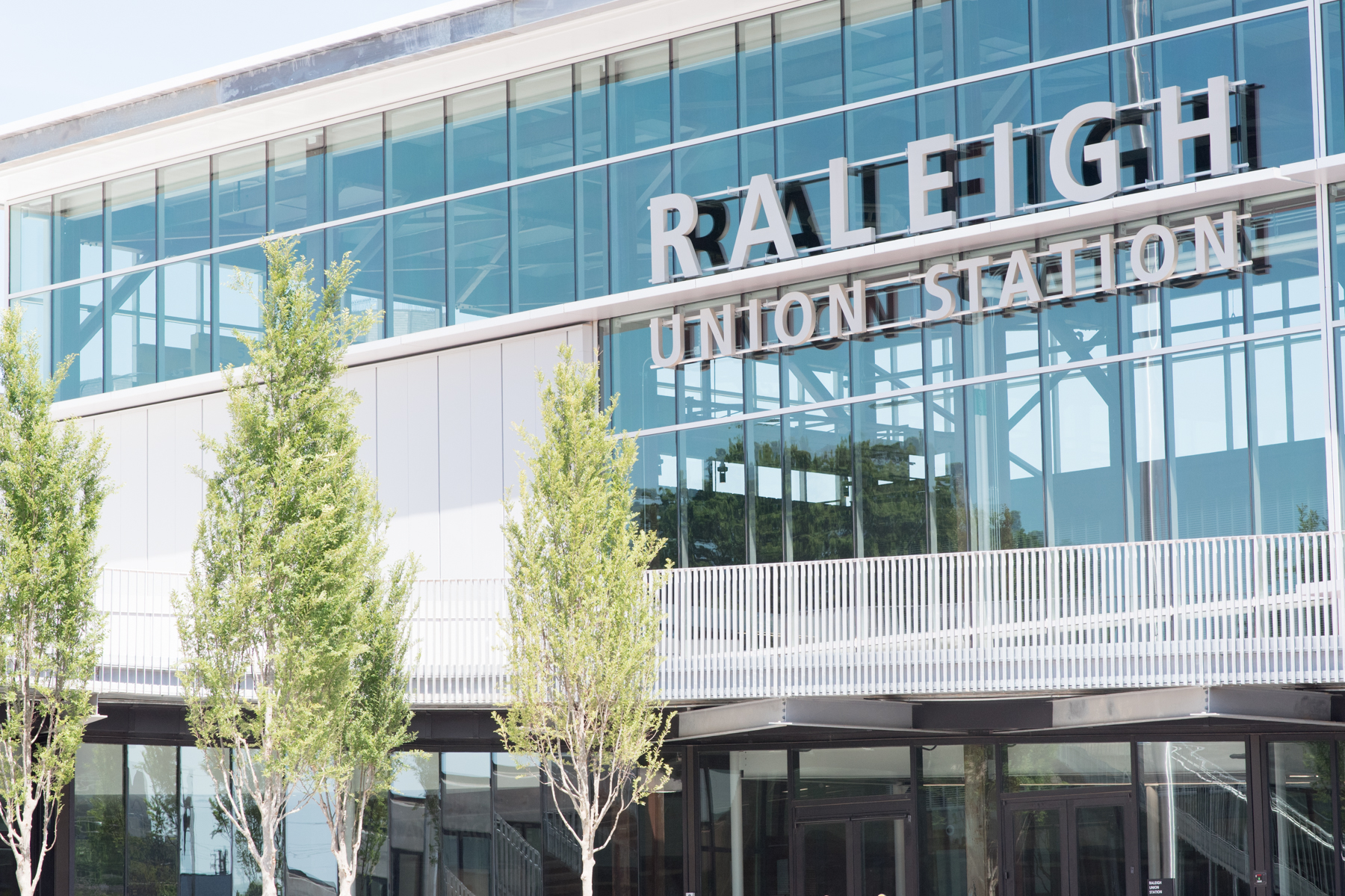
- Signage above the West Martin Street entrance

General information
- Location: 510 West Martin Street; Raleigh, North Carolina; United States
- Coordinates: 35°46′38″N 78°38′50″W
- Owner: City of Raleigh
- Line: NCRR Corridor
- Platforms: 1 island platform
- Tracks: 2
- Connections: GoRaleigh: 9, R-Line

Construction
- Structure type: At-grade
- Parking: Yes; paid
- Cycle facilities: Racks
- Accessible: Yes
- Architect: Clearscapes
- Architectural style: Modern

Other information
- Station code: Amtrak: RGH

History
- Opened: July 10, 2018

Passengers
- FY 2025: 289,230 (Amtrak)

Services
Preceding station	Amtrak	Following station
Cary toward Charlotte	Carolinian	Selma toward New York
North Carolina State Fair (seasonal) toward Charlotte	Carolinian	Selma toward New York
Cary toward Charlotte	Piedmont	Terminus
North Carolina State Fair (seasonal) toward Charlotte	Piedmont	Terminus
Cary toward Miami	Floridian	Rocky Mount toward Chicago
Former services
Preceding station	Amtrak	Following station
Cary toward Miami	Silver Star until 2024	Rocky Mount toward New York
Preceding station	Southern Railway	Following station
Method toward North Wilkesboro	North Wilkesboro – Morehead City	Garner toward Morehead City
Preceding station	Seaboard Air Line Railroad	Following station
Cary toward Tampa or Miami	Main Line	Wake Forest toward Richmond
Location

Raleigh Union Station is an intermodal transit station in Raleigh, North Carolina, United States. Train service began the morning of July 10, 2018. Its main building serves as an Amtrak train station, while a future adjacent building will serve as the bus terminus for GoTriangle. The station is located at the Boylan Wye, a railroad junction used by CSX and Norfolk Southern, and adjacent to the Depot Historic District in downtown Raleigh.

As of fiscal year 2018, it is the second busiest station in North Carolina, behind Charlotte, and one of the busiest in the Southeast.

== Station design and services ==
The station has four levels identified as Street, Main, Lower Mezzanine and Upper Mezzanine. It has 26,000 square feet (2,400 m^{2}) of building space, with 9,200 square feet (850 m^{2}) of passenger rail space. The island platform is 920 ft (280 m) long, offering level boarding and is fully accessible compliant; it is the first high-level platform in North Carolina, and one of two high-level platforms south of Washington on Amtrak lines, the other being Roanoke. The facility is open daily at 6:00am–11:00pm, which includes a ticket office, passenger assistance, baggage service and a civic hall (waiting area).

Operated by Amtrak, the station is served by 12 trains per day:

- The Carolinian, with one train heading toward New York after the morning rush and one heading toward Charlotte during the afternoon rush
- The Piedmont (northern terminus), a regional companion of the Carolinian that runs four round-trips to and from Charlotte.
- The Floridian, with one train heading toward Chicago during the morning rush and one heading toward Miami in the evening.

== History ==
=== Predecessor stations ===
==== Union Depot ====
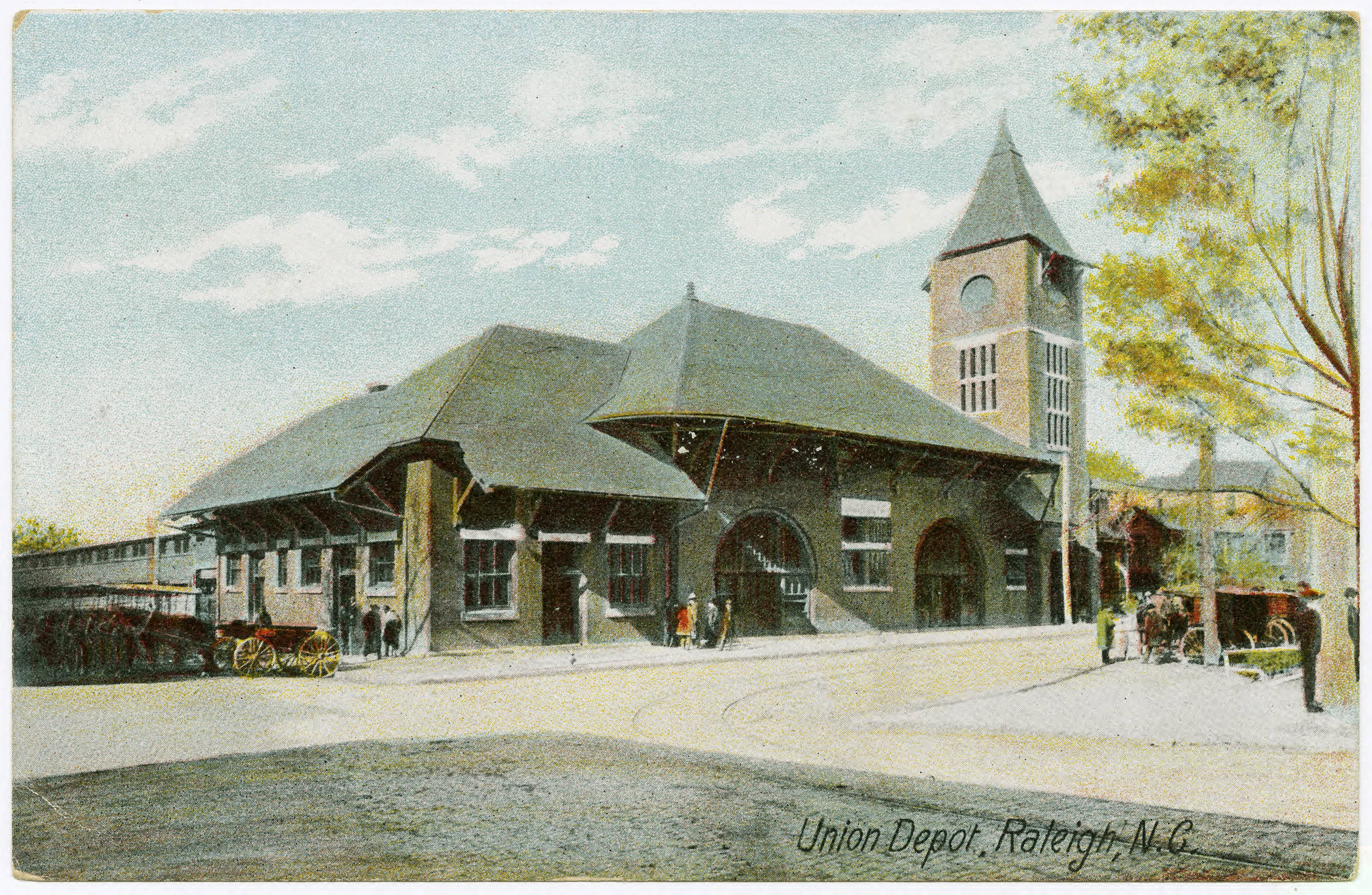
Postcard of Union Depot

Opened in 1890, the Union Depot (also referred as Union Station) was constructed by the Raleigh and Gaston Railroad, a predecessor of the Seaboard Air Line, at the corner of Dawson and West Martin streets. It also served the original Norfolk Southern Railway and Southern Railway, with a total of four tracks. The station was reached by trackage from the nearby Boylan Wye where the North Carolina Railroad (operated by Southern), the original Norfolk Southern, and the Seaboard converged.

Being a stub-end station, Union Depot was inconvenient to operate, especially as passenger trains became longer and obstructed the Boylan Wye. Seaboard left the station in 1942 and Southern in 1950, by which time the original Norfolk Southern had discontinued its passenger trains.

The head-house of the 1890 Union Depot survives as an office building, minus its tower. The former platform area and viaduct were subsequently redeveloped as industrial property.

==== Seaboard station ====
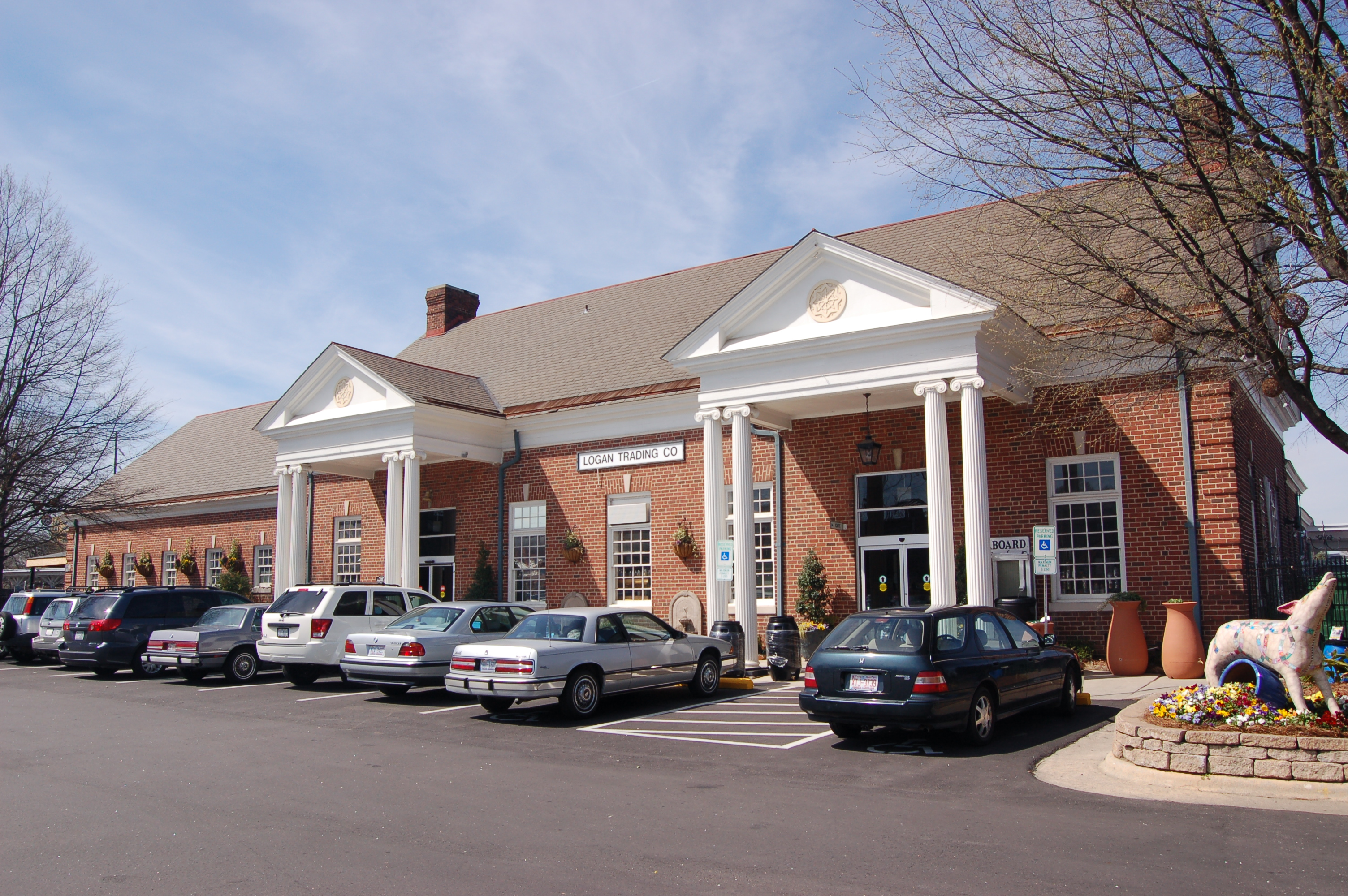
1942 Seaboard station

Opened in 1942, the Seaboard station was located north of downtown at 707 Semart Drive, adjacent to Seaboard's freight yard. Seaboard merged with the Atlantic Coast Line Railroad as the Seaboard Coast Line Railroad. Into the latter 1960s the Seaboard Air Line, and then the Seaboard Coast line operated the New York-Florida Silver Meteor and Silver Star trains and the Portsmouth, Virginia-Jacksonville Tidewater through the new station. The SAL/SCL also ran the Silver Comet train bound southwest to Athens, Atlanta and Birmingham through the station as well.

In 1971, passenger operations were taken over by Amtrak, which leased the station from SCL. The station's ownership passed to CSX Corporation when SCL's parent company, Seaboard Coast Line Industries, merged with Chessie System. By January 16, 1972, the Silver Meteor was rerouted east through Florence and Charleston, South Carolina.

In 1985, CSX abandoned its S-Line (the former SAL main line) between Norlina, North Carolina and Petersburg, Virginia. Amtrak was forced to reroute its trains between Raleigh and the Northeast through Selma along the CSX A-Line and the North Carolina Railroad. The Seaboard station could not easily accommodate the reroute, so Amtrak moved all operations to the smaller Southern station. The Seaboard station was subsequently repurposed as a retail space and a restaurant. The area is being redeveloped with an understanding that part of the station will be preserved although possibly relocated.

==== Southern station ====
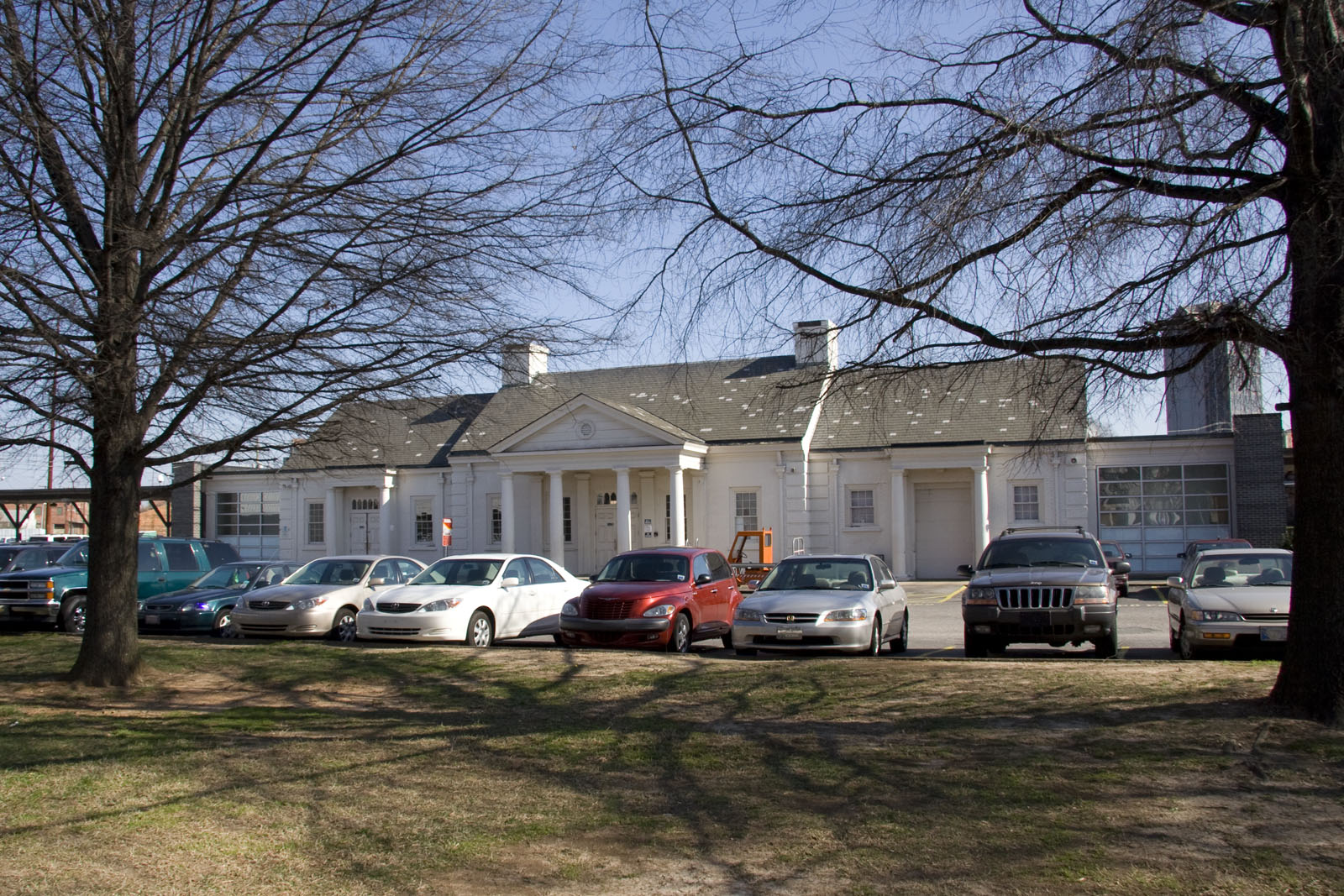
1950 Southern station

Opened in 1950, by Southern Railway, the Colonial Revival station was located at 320 West Cabarrus Street, two blocks south of the current Raleigh Union Station. Until the early 1950s the Southern Railway ran the Carolina Special and two other trains daily from Greensboro, through Raleigh, to Goldsboro, where an Atlantic Coast Line Railroad connection could be made to Wilmington. The Carolina Special western destination was Cincinnati. In 1964, Southern withdrew its final trains from Raleigh, local trains to Greensboro to the west and Goldsboro to the east, and then closed the station. The station was repurposed for storage, leaving the old Seaboard station as the sole passenger rail station in Raleigh for the next 21 years.

In 1985, CSX abandoned the S-Line between Norlina and Petersburg. Amtrak opted to move its services to the smaller Southern station, which was better suited for the new route that ran through Selma. That year, the North Carolina Railroad acquired the station from Norfolk Southern (formed three years earlier as a merger between Southern and N&W) and renovated the station, then leased it to Amtrak. Passenger rail service resumed in 1986.

At 10:14pm, on July 9, 2018, the Piedmont #78 was the final train to arrive at the station; the following day, all passenger rail service was relocated to the Raleigh Union Station and the former Southern/Amtrak station was officially closed. Demolition of the Southern station finished on August 1, 2018. The parcel will be redeveloped.

=== Raleigh Union Station ===
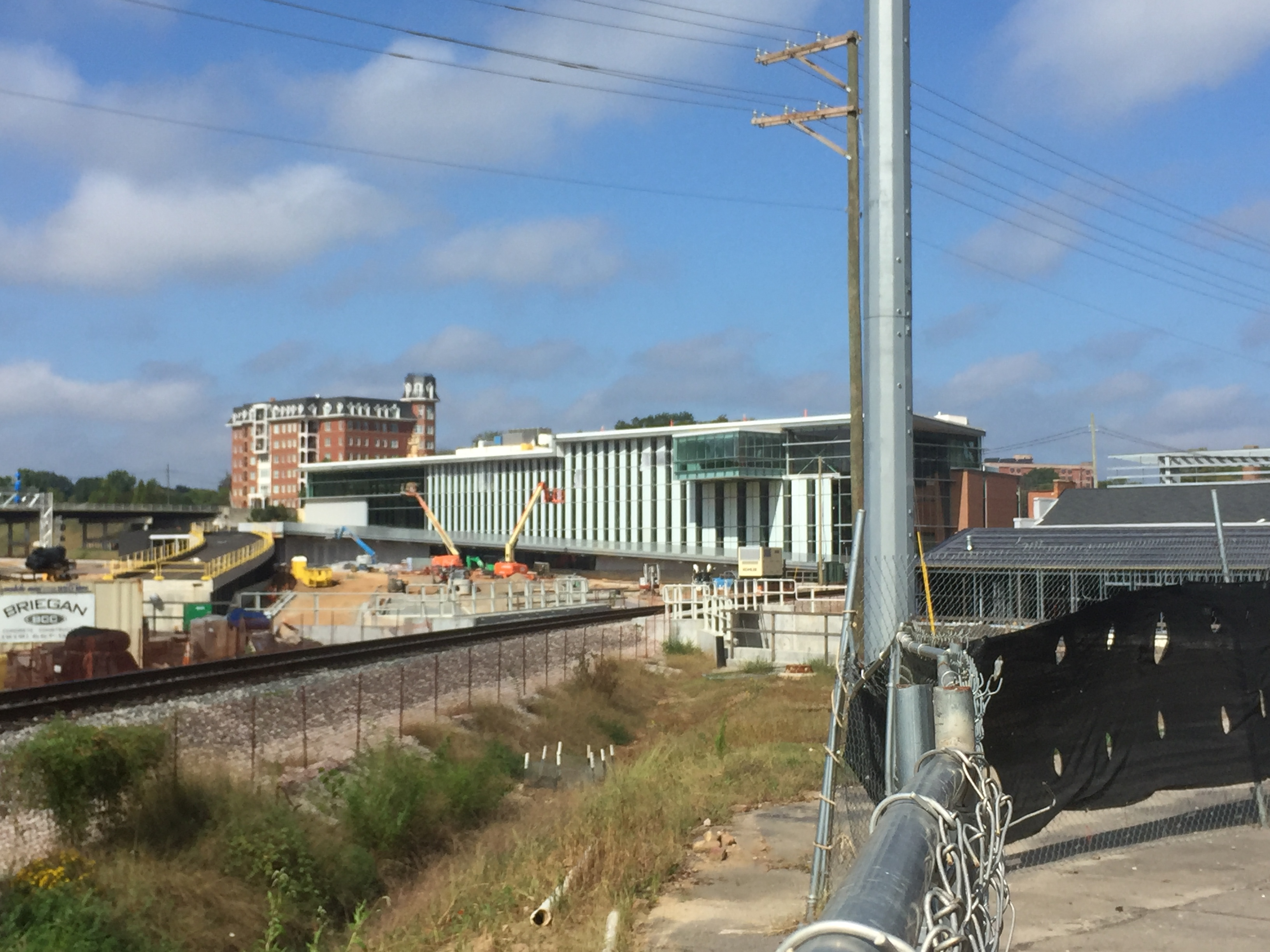
Progress on the new Union Station, as seen mid October 2017

On April 23, 2010, the City of Raleigh proposed an extensive multimodal transit center a few blocks west of the site of the 1890 Union Depot to serve the Southeast High Speed Rail Corridor, conventional Amtrak trains, future commuter rail over the North Carolina Railroad, as well as Capital Area Transit local, Triangle Transit regional, and Greyhound intercity buses. The name of the project, "Union Station," pays homage to the former Union Depot, which was commonly referred to as Union Station; the original depot operated from 1890 to 1950.

On June 29, 2011, North Carolina Department of Transportation (NCDOT) proposed a less expensive plan that would relocate the Amtrak station to an abandoned industrial site, known locally as the Viaduct Building, within the Boylan Wye, some 800 feet north of Amtrak's then-facility from corner to corner. The plan focused on Amtrak's needs, with provisions to add commuter rail and SEHSR later.

Station and track design began in 2013 and was completed in late 2014. The environmental assessment was approved on March 12, 2014. On March 3, 2015, the Raleigh City Council approved full funding for the station, $88.8 million (Local $25.9M, State $9M, Federal TIGER/ARRA $53.9M); additional funds of $21.6 million (State 5$5.1M and Federal $16.5M) were also provided for supporting project costs. A ceremonial groundbreaking followed on May 9, while actual start of construction began in January 2016.

On April 30, 2018, a dedication ceremony was held at the station with various city and state officials, including Raleigh Mayor Nancy McFarlane, U.S. Representative David Price and State Senator Nelson Dollar.

In June 2024, the station was the terminus of the U.S. Open Express, which operated during the U.S. Open at course number 2 of Pinehurst Resort. On November 10, 2024, the Silver Star was merged with the Capitol Limited as the Floridian.

== Future ==
The station is designed for significant future expansion. A second island platform and third track, along the Norfolk Southern H-Line, are planned to serve the under-development Durham-Wake commuter rail line. A northern concourse, with a new island platform and station track, on the CSX Aberdeen Subdivision (also known as the S-Line) is planned for the future Southeast High Speed Rail Corridor.

In December 2023, NCDOT was awarded nearly $1.09 billion in Federal Railroad Administration grants that will be used to upgrade the Aberdeen Subdivision between Raleigh and Wake Forest. With construction along the line to begin in 2024, NCDOT has a tentative completion date of 2030, which includes the station's northern concourse expansion.

=== Phase II ===
On the southwest corner of West and Hargett Streets, GoTriangle plans to build a bus terminal, referred to as Raleigh Union Station Bus (RUS Bus) on a 1.77-acre (0.72 ha) site. Designed by Perkins Eastman and developed by Hoffman and Associates, it will feature a 6-10 bay off-street transit facility, with two high-rise buildings on top and a pedestrian bridge that connects directly to Raleigh Union Station. Amenities include 350 unit apartments, 200 room hotel, 18,000 square feet (1,700 m^{2}) for retail, and 550 space parking garage. Estimated to cost $40.4 million (2018 US dollars), $20 million of which is covered by a 2018 Build Grant by the U.S. Department of Transportation, with the remaining through local and state funds. Scheduled to open in 2025, RUS Bus will serve as a secondary Downtown Raleigh hub for GoRaleigh, and GoTriangle, supplementing the existing GoRaleigh Station at Moore Square.
