= Main Line (Seaboard Air Line Railroad) =

Historic railroad in the Southeast

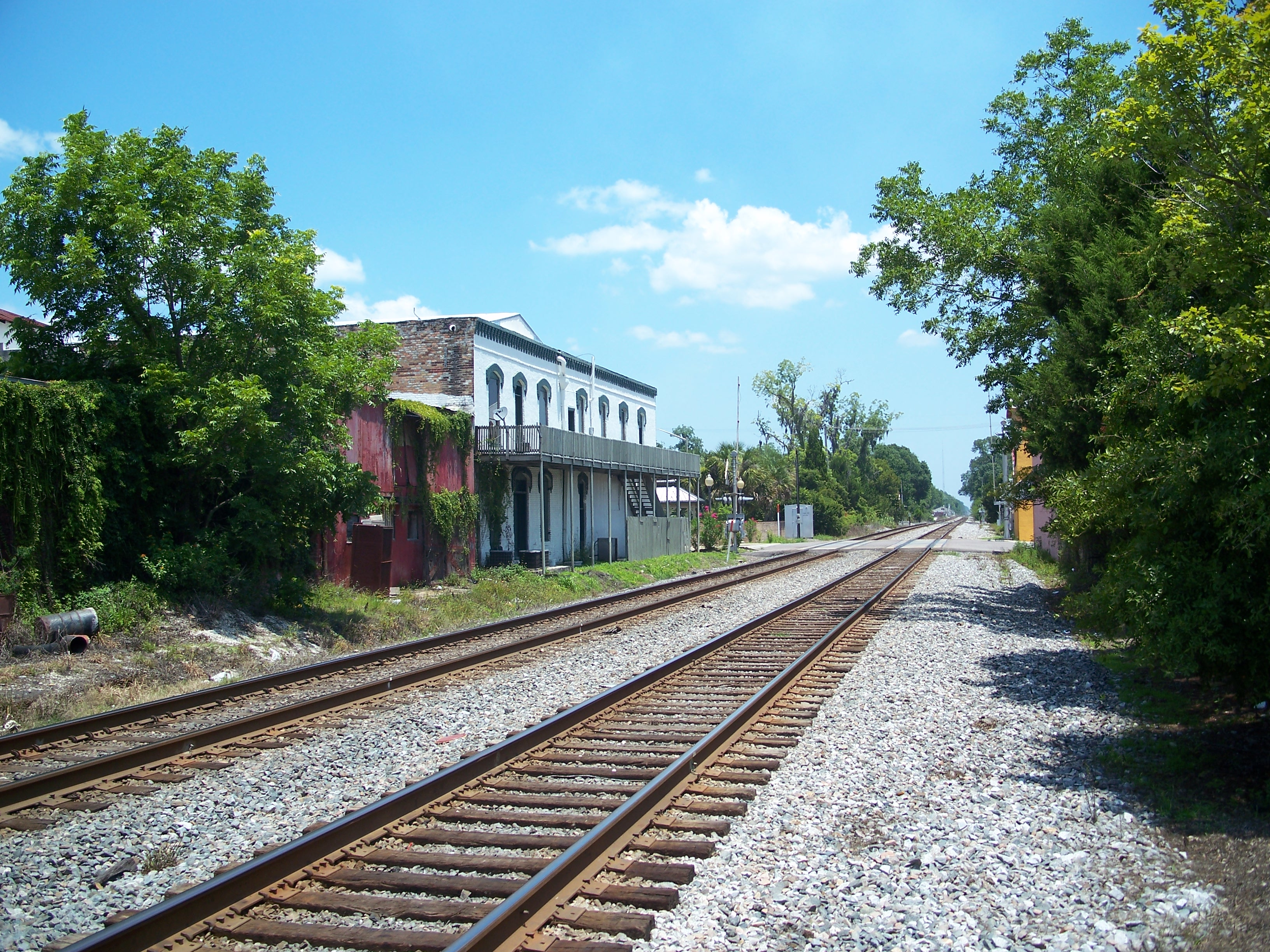
- Main Line in Starke, Florida in 2007

Overview
- Other name: S Line
- Status: Some segments are still operating
- Owner: Seaboard Air Line Railroad (1900-1967); Seaboard Coast Line Railroad (1967-1982); Seaboard System Railroad (1982-1986); CSX Transportation (1986-present)
- Termini: Richmond, Virginia; Tampa, Florida

Technical
- Line length: 845 mi (1,360 km)
- Track gauge: 1,435 mm (4 ft 8 1/2 in) standard gauge
- Electrification: No
- Signalling: Centralized traffic control
Route map
Interactive Map of Seaboard Air Line Railroad's Main Line. (Click to enlarge)

The Seaboard Air Line Railroad’s Main Line was the backbone of the Seaboard Air Line Railroad's network in the southeastern United States. The main line ran from Richmond, Virginia to Tampa, Florida, a distance of over 800 miles. While some segments of the line have been abandoned as of 2025, most of the line is still in service and is owned by the Seaboard Air Line's successor, CSX Transportation as their S Line.

== Route description ==
The Seaboard Air Line's main line began in Richmond, Virginia. From Richmond, it proceeded south to Petersburg before turning southwest through rural southern Virginia. It then entered North Carolina near Norlina and continued south through Raleigh, Sanford, and Hamlet. It then entered South Carolina just south of Hamlet and continued southwest to Columbia. Beyond Columbia, the main line turned south to Savannah, Georgia. From Savannah, it ran though coastal Georgia and entered Florida just south of Kingsland, Georgia. In Florida, it continued south to Jacksonville, where it turned west a short distance to Baldwin. From Baldwin, it continued south through Ocala, Wildwood, and Plant City to its terminus in Tampa.

For much of its history, the Seaboard Air Line divided its main line in to subdivisions on its employee timetables, a practice which is still used by successor CSX today. The Seaboard Air Line classified the main line as the following subdivisions:

- Richmond Subdivision (Richmond to Raleigh)
- Raleigh Subdivision (Raleigh to Hamlet)
- Hamlet Subdivision (Hamlet to Columbia)
- Columbia Subdivision (Columbia to Savannah)
- Orange Subdivision (within Savannah)
- Jacksonville Subdivision (Savannah to Jacksonville)
- Baldwin Subdivision (Jacksonville to Wildwood)
- Miami Subdivision (Wildwood to Coleman, which continued down a branch line to Miami)
- Tampa Subdivision (Coleman to Tampa, which continued via a branch line to St. Petersburg)

== History ==
=== Creation ===
By the time the Seaboard Air Line Railroad (known as the Seaboard Air Line Railway before 1946) was officially created, track that would make up its main line had already been built by the company's predecessors. The main line was built in the late 1800s by the following companies:

| Railroad | From | To | Notes |
|---|---|---|---|
| Richmond, Petersburg and Carolina Railroad | Richmond, Virginia | Norlina, North Carolina | |
| Raleigh and Gaston Railroad | Norlina | Raleigh, North Carolina | |
| Raleigh and Augusta Air Line Railroad | Raleigh | Hamlet, North Carolina | |
| Palmetto Railroad | Hamlet | Cheraw, South Carolina | |
| Chesterfield and Kershaw Railroad | Cheraw | Camden, South Carolina | |
| South Bound Railroad | Camden | Savannah, Georgia | Part of the Florida Central and Peninsular Railroad network |
| Florida Central and Peninsular Railroad Northern Division | Savannah | Georgia/Florida state line | Part of the Florida Central and Peninsular Railroad network |
| Florida Northern Railroad | Georgia/Florida state line | Jacksonville, Florida | Part of the Florida Central and Peninsular Railroad network |
| Florida, Atlantic and Gulf Central Railroad | Jacksonville | Baldwin, Florida | Part of the Florida Central and Peninsular Railroad network |
| Florida Railroad | Baldwin | Waldo, Florida | Part of the Florida Central and Peninsular Railroad network |
| Florida Transit and Peninsular Railroad Tampa Division | Waldo | Tampa, Florida | Part of the Florida Central and Peninsular Railroad network |

By 1900, the Seaboard Air Line Railway was incorporated, which brought together the predecessor companies together and created the main line north of Camden, South Carolina. At this time, the company had leased the Florida Central and Peninsular Railroad (FC&P) network which expanded the system through Georgia and Florida. The Seaboard Air Line would fully not own the FC&P network until 1903.

=== Passenger and freight service ===
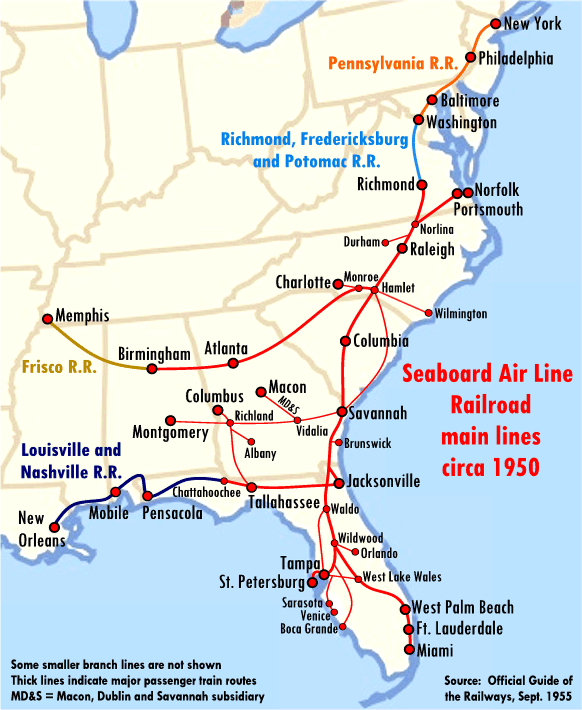
Seaboard Air Line network in 1950

The Seaboard Air Line would run many historic passenger services over its main line, many of which ran from New York to Florida. Some of the Seaboard's passenger trains included the Florida and Metropolitan Limited, Atlanta Special, Suwanee River Special, Orange Blossom Special, Southern States Special, Cotton Blossom, Palmland, Silver Meteor, Silver Comet, Silver Star, Sunland, and Tidewater.

Seaboard also had a number of fast, high-priority freight trains called Red Ball freights between various points on its system. However, from 1918 to 1966, a number of through freight trains instead ran the Andrews and Charleston Subdivisions between Hamlet, North Carolina and Savannah, Georgia to allow passenger trains to be prioritized on the main line.

=== Improvements over the years ===
In 1909, the Seaboard Air Line established its own port facility in Tampa, Florida on an island just south of downtown. The island would be named Seddon Island, which was named after Seaboard's chief engineer W.L. Seddon. The main line was extended a short distance to the island via a drawbridge over Garrison Channel.

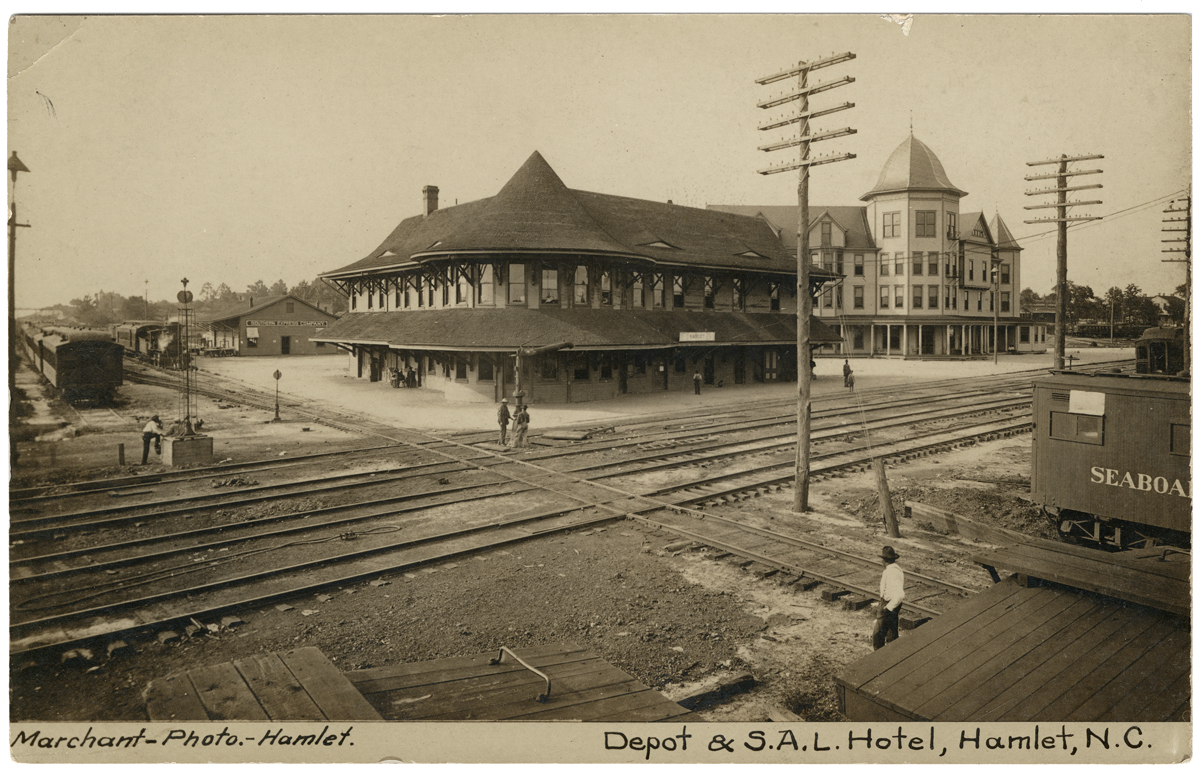
Seaboard Air Line main line in Hamlet, North Carolina in 1912

In the 1910s and 1920s, the Seaboard Air Line would make improvements to its network to allow for more capacity on the main line. In 1918, the company completed its East Carolina Line, which ran from the main line in Hamlet, North Carolina and ran through Charleston, South Carolina before reconnecting to the main line in Savannah, Georgia. The East Carolina Line would become the primary freight route through this area, which allowed passenger service to be prioritized on the main line.

In 1926, Automatic block signals were installed on the main line between Richmond and Hamlet and between Savannah and Jacksonville.

More improvements to the network were also made in Florida in response to the Florida land boom of the 1920s. In 1925, the Gross Cutoff in northern Florida was completed, which ran from a small turpentine village named Gross just south of the Florida/Georgia border and provided a direct route to the main line at Baldwin, bypassing the busy Jacksonville Terminal area. The same year, the company also completed its Brooksville Subdivision, which ran from Waldo to Tampa via Brooksville and Inverness which allowed for some freight trains to Tampa to be rerouted off the main line. By the end of the decade, automatic block signals were also installed from Baldwin to Coleman, and the main line was expanded to double track between Baldwin and Starke, between Wildwood and Coleman (where the newly-built Miami Subdivision diverged), and a segment near Tampa Union Station.

The Seaboard Air Line upgraded the signal system to Centralized traffic control along the full route of main line in the 1940s to improve efficiency. The Seaboard Air Line would also be the first railroad to install a talking hot box detector (the predecessor to the modern defect detector). This first talking hot box detector was installed on the main line in Riceboro, Georgia.

=== Mergers and consolidation ===
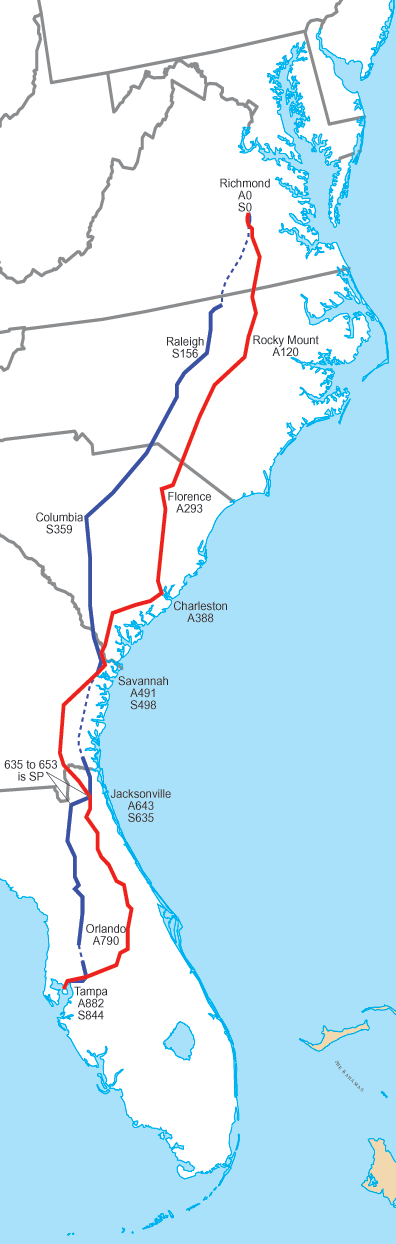
The SAL Main Line (blue) in relation to the ACL Main Line (red). Dashed lines represent where the line has been abandoned.

In 1967, the Seaboard Air Line merged with their long-time rival, the Atlantic Coast Line Railroad (ACL). The ACL also had a main line running from Richmond, Virginia to Tampa, Florida that was roughly parallel to the SAL’s main line. The two main lines crossed each other in Chester, Petersburg, Savannah, Jacksonville, and Plant City. After the merger was complete, the company was named the Seaboard Coast Line Railroad (SCL). To differentiate the two main lines, the Seaboard Coast Line designated the SAL’s main line as the "S Line" while the ACL’s main line became the "A Line". The letter S was added as a prefix to the mileposts on the S Line (S was also added to the beginning of the pre-existing letter prefixes on the SAL’s branch lines).

By the end of the 1960s, the Seaboard Coast Line would begin abandoning segments of the S Line in an effort to consolidate the combined network. In Virginia, the company abandoned the S Line from just south of Bellwood to Dunlop (just north of Petersburg). The remaining line at Dunlop was connected to the A Line, and a new stretch of track was built to connect the remaining track south of Bellwood to the A Line at Centralia. In southern Georgia near Savannah, the company abandoned the S Line's bridge crossing the Ogeechee River which was located directly beside the A Line. Remaining track on both sides of the river was then connected to the A Line, which had a double-track bridge over the river. This abandonment also eliminated the at-grade crossing of the two lines at Burroughs. By 1970, another short segment of the S Line was abandoned in Florida between Owensboro (near Dade City) and Zephyrhills with the ex-ACL West Coast Subdivision linking the remaining segments.

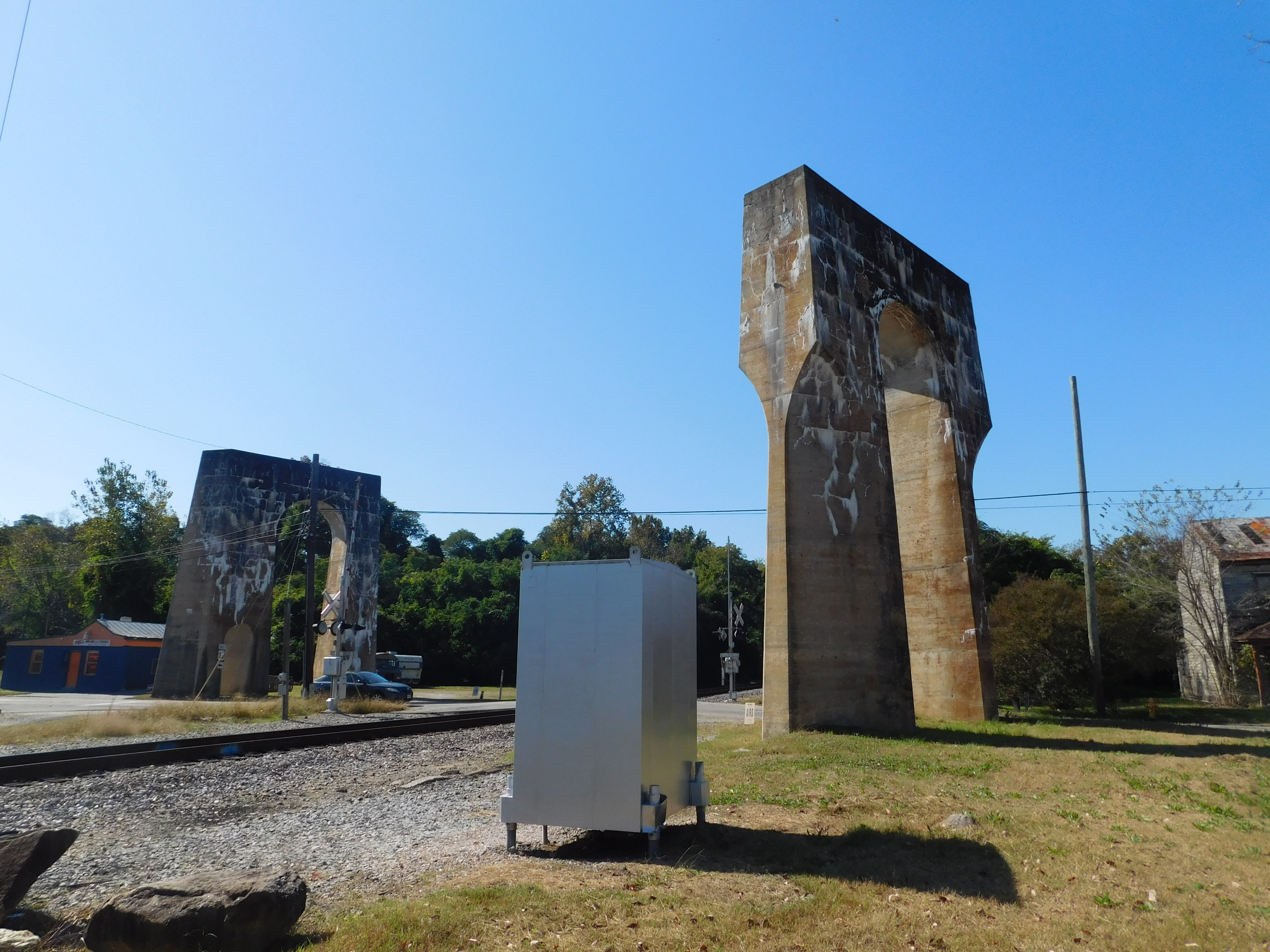
Remaining concrete piers of the SAL main line's former bridge in Petersburg, Virginia.

In 1971, the Seaboard Coast Line abandoned more of the S Line in the vicinity of Petersburg, Virginia. Track was removed from the connection to the A Line at Dunlop though Petersburg to Burgess with service being consolidated on the A Line. The Burgess Cutoff was then built to connect the remaining S Line to the south to Collier Yard on the A Line. The S Line's tall bridge over the Appomattox River in Petersburg, which was built in 1913, eventually had its deck removed in 1983 leaving only its concrete supports.

In 1979, the Seaboard Coast Line closed its terminal on Seddon Island in Tampa and sold the property. The bridge to the island was removed and track was truncated to Old Tampa Yard, which was the primary freight yard for Tampa before the construction of Yeoman Yard in the 1950s. Seddon Island has since been redeveloped and is now known as Harbour Island.

In 1980, the Seaboard Coast Line's parent company, Seaboard Coast Line Industries (SCLI), merged with the Chessie System, creating CSX Corporation. CSX Corporation initially operated the Chessie and SCLI Systems separately, however in 1982 they began the process of consolidating the railroads of both holding companies. This began with the formation of the Seaboard System Railroad, which merged all of the railroads owned by SCLI into one. In 1986, Seaboard System renamed themselves CSX Transportation (CSXT), and by August 1987, the Chesapeake and Ohio Railway, the final remaining railroad under the Chessie System brand, was merged into CSXT. As the transition into CSX was being completed, the company would abandon more segments of the S Line. In 1986, CSX abandoned the S Line between Riceboro and Bladen, Georgia, severing the line as a through route between Savannah and Jacksonville. Additional track was abandoned between Bladen and Seals, Georgia four years later. In 1987, the S Line was abandoned between Collier Yard (south of Petersburg, Virginia) and Norlina, North Carolina. A short stretch of the S Line was also abandoned between Jacksonville and Panama Park in the 1980s.

Another short stretch of the S Line between Tampa Union Station and Gary was abandoned in the late 1980s after Amtrak discontinued service to St. Petersburg. Remaining track from Tampa Union Station to Old Tampa Yard was removed in 2023.

== Current conditions and future plans ==
As of 2025, much of the line is still in service.

At the north end, CSX still operates the line from Richmond to just north of Chester, which is now CSX's Bellwood Subdivision.

In Petersburg, Virginia, the concrete supports that once held the S Line's bridge over the Appomattox River are still standing on the northwest side of Petersburg. Despite abandoment of the S Line between Chester and Norlina, North Carolina in the 1980s, CSX continued to own the right of way of the route up until 2019, when it was sold the right of way to the states of Virginia and North Carolina. The states are doing preliminary work to rebuild the line for high-speed passenger service as part of the Southeast High Speed Rail Corridor. Virginia has since bought its portion of the line, and, as December 2023, North Carolina is negotiating a deal to buy the portion in their state.

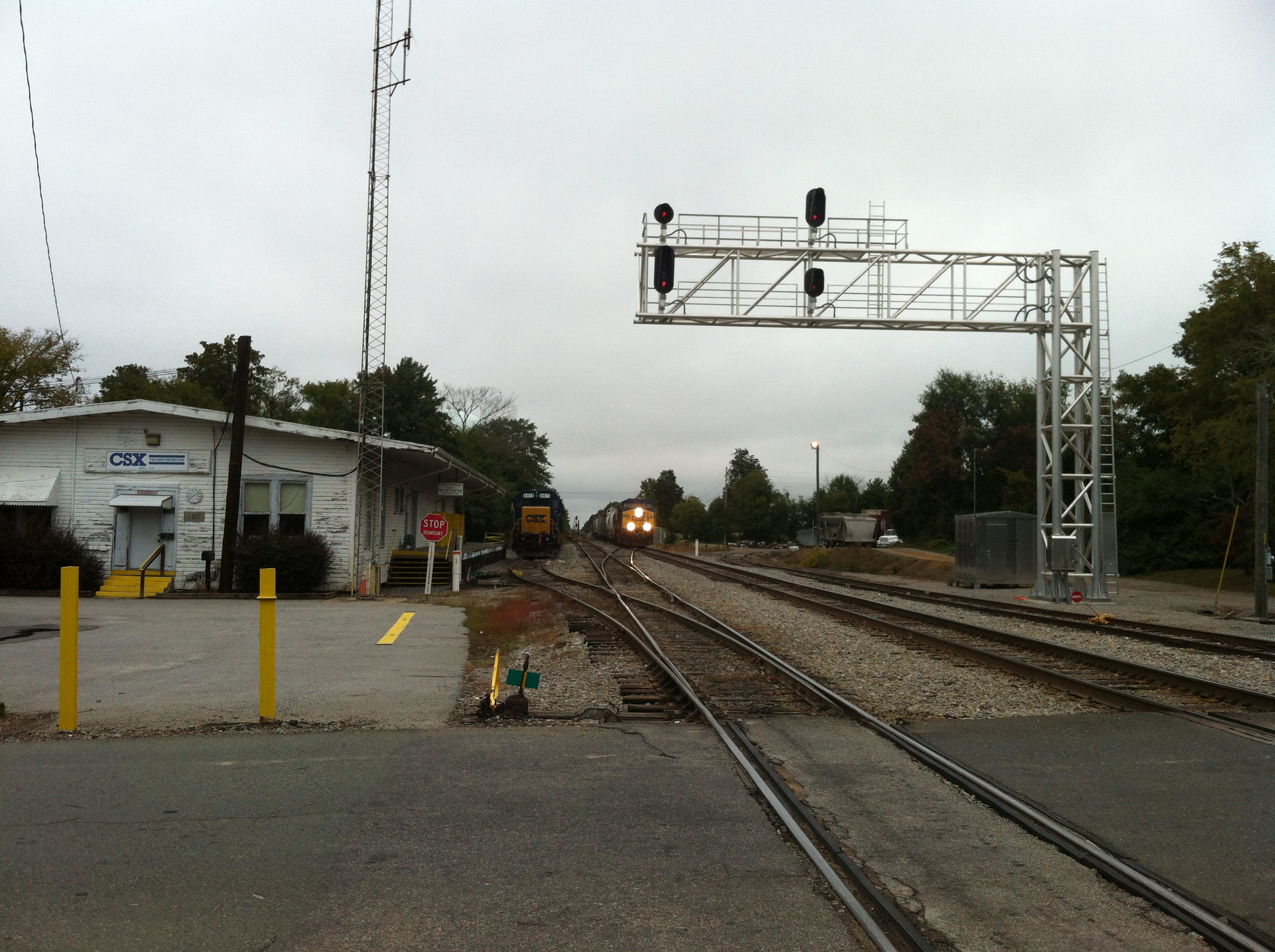
CSX train on the S Line in Apex, North Carolina.

Further south, the S Line is still in service from Norlina, North Carolina to Savannah, Georgia. This segment is now CSX's Norlina Subdivision, Aberdeen Subdivision, Hamlet Subdivision, Columbia Subdivision, and Savannah Subdivision. Amtrak still operates on this segment from Raleigh to Savannah. This is the only segment of the S Line that still carries regular passenger service.

South of Savannah near Richmond Hill, the remnants of the S Line's former bridge over the Ogeechee River remain which are right beside the A Line bridge.

The shortline Riceboro Southern Railway now operates the remaining S Line between Richmond Hill and Riceboro, Georgia. Further south, the First Coast Railroad operates the remaining S Line from Seals, Georgia to Yulee, Florida. Both the First Coast Railroad and the Riceboro Southern Railway took over their respective sections of the S Line in the mid 2000s and are both owned by Genesee & Wyoming. South of Yulee to Panama Park near Jacksonville is now CSX's Kingsland Subdivision. The S Line Urban Greenway is now on the former right of way in northeast Jacksonville.

The S Line in Florida is CSX's primary freight route through the peninsula. From Jacksonville to Baldwin, the S Line runs through CSX's Jacksonville Terminal Subdivision and runs on the Wildwood Subdivision from Baldwin to Owensboro (where the Wildwood Subdivision continues south on a former ACL route). The Hardy Trail runs on part of the abandoned right of way near Dade City. From Zephyrhills to Gary in Tampa, the line is CSX's Yeoman Subdivision and part of the Tampa Terminal Subdivision.

In 2023, the Biden Administration pledged $1.1 billion of funding to rebuild this railway line for direct passenger service between Raliegh and Richmond. In 2026, the Trump administration released $550 million of that funding to the State of North Carolina to start building. It will support trains running at up to 110 mph. This project is known as the S-Line Raleigh to Richmond project.

== Historic stations ==
| State | Milepost | City/Location | Station | Image | Connections and notes |
|---|---|---|---|---|---|
| VA | SRN 3.9 | Richmond | Hermitage | | junction with Richmond, Fredericksburg and Potomac Railroad |
| VA | SRN 0.0; S 0.0 | Richmond | Main Street Station | | Amtrak Northeast Regional originally opened in 1901 closed in 1950s with service relocated to Broad Street Station reopened in 2003 junction at Triple Crossing with: Richmond and Alleghany Railroad (C&O); Richmond and York River Railroad (SOU) |
| VA | S 0.7 | Richmond | Manchester | | junction with Richmond and Danville Railroad (SOU) |
| VA | S 8.6 | Bellwood | Bellwood | | junction with Hopewell Subdivision |
| VA | S 13.0 | Chester | Chester | | junction with Atlantic Coast Line Railroad Main Line |
| VA | S 18.7 | | Lynch | | |
| VA | S 22.9 | Petersburg | Petersburg | | |
| VA | S 27.5 | | Ryan | | |
| VA | S 31.1 | Burgess | Burgess | | |
| VA | S 37.5 | Dinwiddie | Dinwiddie | | |
| VA | S 41.8 | DeWitt | DeWitt | | |
| VA | S 47.6 | McKenney | McKenney | | |
| VA | S 52.2 | Rawlings | Rawlings | | |
| VA | S 57.1 | Warfield | Warfield | | |
| VA | S 61.1 | Alberta | Alberta | | junction with Virginian Railway (N&W) |
| VA | S 63.9 | Cochran | Cochran | | |
| VA | S 67.8 | Grandy | Grandy | | |
| VA | S 74.0 | | Skelton | | |
| VA | S 79.0 | La Crosse | La Crosse | | junction with Atlantic and Danville Railway (N&W) |
| VA | S 83.7 | | Hagood | | |
| VA | S 86.4 | Bracey | Bracey | | |
| NC | S 91.0 | | Paschall | | |
| NC | S 94.9 | Wise | Wise | | |
| NC | S 98.4 | Norlina | Norlina | | originally Ridgeway Junction junction with Portsmouth Subdivision |
| NC | S 106.5 | Middleburg | Middleburg | | |
| NC | S 109.8 | | Greystone | | |
| NC | S 113.8 | Henderson | Henderson | | junction with: Durham Subdivision; Oxford & Henderson Railroad (SOU) |
| NC | S 118.3 | | Gill | | |
| NC | S 121.8 | Kittrell | Kittrell | | |
| NC | S 130.3 | Franklinton | Franklinton | | junction with Louisburg Subdivision |
| NC | S 136.5 | Youngsville | Youngsville | | |
| NC | S 140.5 | Wake Forest | Wake Forest | | |
| NC | S 154.8 | Raleigh | Edgeton | | |
| NC | S 156.1 | Raleigh | Raleigh | | junction with: Raleigh, Charlotte and Southern Railway (SOU); Norfolk Southern Railway (SOU) |
| NC | S 160.2 | Raleigh | Meredith College | | |
| NC | S 160.5 | Raleigh | Method | | |
| NC | S 168.3 | Cary | Cary | | Amtrak Silver Star, Carolinian, and Piedmont station rebuilt in 1996 junction with North Carolina Railroad (SOU) |
| NC | S 171.1 | Apex | Apex | | junction with Durham and Southern Railway |
| NC | S 177.3 | New Hill | New Hill | | |
| NC | S 179.8 | Bonsal | Bonsal | | junction with Durham and South Carolina Railroad (SOU) |
| NC | S 181.1 | | Merry Oaks | | |
| NC | S 187.3 | Moncure | Moncure | | junction with Pittsboro Subdivision |
| NC | S 195.1 | Colon | Colon | | junction with Raleigh and Western Railway (SOU) |
| NC | S 198.9 | Sanford | Sanford | | junction with: Atlantic Coast Line Railroad Sanford Branch; Atlantic and Western Railway; Atlantic and Yadkin Railway (SOU) |
| NC | S 205.6 | Lemon Springs | Lemon Springs | | |
| NC | S 211.1 | Cameron | Cameron | | |
| NC | S 216.6 | Vass | Vass | | also known as Winder |
| NC | S 219.9 | | Fleet | | |
| NC | S 225.0 | Southern Pines | Southern Pines | | Amtrak Silver Star |
| NC | S 228.7 | Aberdeen | Aberdeen | | junction with: Aberdeen and Asheboro Railroad (NS); Aberdeen and Rockfish Railroad |
| NC | S 238.2 | | Mackall | | |
| NC | S 239.4 | Hoffman | Hoffman | | |
| NC | S 253.4 | Hamlet | Hamlet | | Amtrak Silver Star station rebuilt in 1900 junction with: Andrews Subdivision (via East Junction); Monroe Subdivision; Wilmington Subdivision |
| NC | S 260.8 | | Osborne | | |
| SC | S 269.3 | Wallace | Wallace | | |
| SC | S 271.8 | Cheraw | Cheraw | | junction with: Atlantic Coast Line Railroad Wadesboro—Florence Line; Chesterfield and Lancaster Railroad (SAL); Bennettsville and Cheraw Railroad |
| SC | S 279.8 | | Gillespie | | |
| SC | S 284.9 | Patrick | Patrick | | station rebuilt in 1900 |
| SC | S 292.0 | | Middendorf | | |
| SC | S 299.3 | McBee | McBee | | junction with Hartsville Subdivision |
| SC | S 307.0 | Bethune | Bethune | | |
| SC | S 312.6 | Cassatt | Cassatt | | |
| SC | S 319.5 | | Shepard | | |
| SC | S 326.5 | Camden | Camden | | Amtrak Silver Star |
| SC | S 330.7 | Lugoff | Lugoff | | |
| SC | S 339.0 | Blaney | Blaney | | later known as Elgin |
| SC | S 349.4 | | Weddell | | |
| SC | S 358.4 | | Elmwood | | |
| SC | S 360.7 | Columbia | Columbia | | Amtrak Silver Star rebuilt in 1903 and 1991 junction with: Atlantic Coast Line Railroad Sumter—Columbia Line; Charlotte, Columbia and Augusta Railroad (SOU); Spartanburg, Union and Columbia Railroad (SOU); Carolina Midland Railway (SOU) |
| SC | S 362.5 | Cayce | Cayce | | |
| SC | S 366.5 | | Dixiana | | |
| SC | S 371.6 | Gaston | Gaston | | |
| SC | S 381.0 | Swansea | Swansea | | |
| SC | S 385.6 | Woodford | Woodford | | |
| SC | S 393.7 | Livingston | Livingston | | |
| SC | S 402.0 | Norway | Norway | | |
| SC | S 414.1 | Denmark | Denmark | | Amtrak Silver Star junction with: Southern Railway Augusta–Charleston Line; Atlantic Coast Line Railroad Florence—Robbins Line |
| SC | S 417.7 | Govan | Govan | | |
| SC | S 426.2 | Ulmer | Ulmer | | |
| SC | S 436.0 | Fairfax | Fairfax | | junction with Charleston & Western Carolina Railway (ACL) |
| SC | S 442.8 | Gifford | Gifford | | |
| SC | S 450.5 | Estill | Estill | | |
| SC | S 460.2 | Garnett | Garnett | | |
| GA | S 469.0 | Clyo | Clyo | | |
| GA | S 478.8 | | Stillwell | | |
| GA | S 481.2 | Rincon | Rincon | | |
| GA | S 490.1 | | Meinhard | | |
| GA | S 497.3 | Savannah | Central Junction | | junction with: Savannah Subdivision & Charleston Subdivision; Atlantic Coast Line Railroad Main Line; Savannah and Atlantic Railroad (CoG/SOU) |
| GA | S 501.8 | Savannah | Savannah Union Station | | accessed via a spur track |
| GA | S 512.4 | Savannah | Burroughs | | junction with Atlantic Coast Line Railroad Main Line |
| GA | S 515.6 | Richmond Hill | Richmond Hill | | |
| GA | S 522.1 | Limerick | Limerick | | |
| GA | S 527.2 | Midway | Dorchester | | also known as Dorchester |
| GA | S 529.1 | Riceboro | Riceboro | | |
| GA | S 537.1 | | Jones | | |
| GA | S 540.1 | Warsaw | Warsaw | | |
| GA | S 544.1 | Townsend | Townsend | | |
| GA | S 550.4 | | Cox | | |
| GA | S 556.8 | Everett | Everett | | junction with Macon and Brunswick Railroad (SOU) |
| GA | S 564.4 | | Thalmann | | junction with Brunswick and Birmingham Railroad (AB&C/ACL) |
| GA | S 568.4 | Bladen | Bladen | | junction with Atlantic Coast Line Railroad Waycross—Brunswick Line |
| GA | S 573.8 | | Hayner | | |
| GA | S 578.3 | Waverly | Waverly | | |
| GA | S 582.6 | White Oak | White Oak | | |
| GA | S 587.7 | Woodbine | Woodbine | | |
| GA | S 593.4 | Seals | Seals | | |
| GA | S 598.9 | Kingsland | Kingsland | | junction with St. Mary's Railroad |
| FL | S 605.4 | Gross | Gross | | junction with Gross Subdivision |
| FL | S 613.5 | Yulee | Yulee | | junction with Fernandina Subdivision |
| FL | S 619.1 | | Tisonia | | |
| FL | S 625.0 | Jacksonville | Eastport | | junction with Dames Point Spur |
| FL | SO 630.1 | Jacksonville | Dames Point | | located on Dames Point Spur served Port of Jacksonville facilities on Dames Point and Blount Island |
| FL | S 629.5 | Jacksonville | Panama Park | | junction with Jacksonville and Southwestern Railroad (ACL) |
| FL | S 638.0 | Jacksonville | Jacksonville Union Terminal | | junction with: Florida East Coast Railway Main Line; Atlantic Coast Line Railroad Main Line; Atlantic, Valdosta and Western Railway (GS&F/SOU) |
| FL | SP 641.6 | Jacksonville | Marietta | | |
| FL | S 652.5 | Baldwin | Baldwin | | junction with Tallahassee Subdivision & Gross Subdivision |
| FL | S 659.0 | | Maxville | | |
| FL | S 669.3 | Lawtey | Lawtey | | junction with Bradford Farms Railroad |
| FL | S 678.4 | Starke | Starke | | |
| FL | S 679.1 | Starke | Wannee Junction | | junction with Wannee Subdivision |
| FL | S 679.9 | Starke | Camp Blanding Junction | | Wye junction with Camp Blanding Lead |
| FL | S 680.1 | Newnan | Newnan | | |
| FL | S 684.6 | Hampton | Hampton | | junction with Georgia Southern and Florida Railway (SOU) |
| FL | S 690.0 | Waldo | Waldo | | junction with Brooksville Subdivision |
| FL | S 696.6 | Orange Heights | Orange Heights | | |
| FL | S 703.3 | Hawthorne | Hawthorne | | junction with Atlantic Coast Line Railroad Palatka Branch |
| FL | S 712.3 | Lochloosa | Lochloosa | | |
| FL | S 714.5 | Island Grove | Island Grove | | |
| FL | S 716.9 | Citra | Citra | | |
| FL | S 722.4 | Sparr | Sparr | | |
| FL | S 725.8 | Anthony | Anthony | | |
| FL | S 731.5 | Ocala | Silver Springs Junction | | junction with Ocklawaha Valley Railroad |
| FL | S 735.3 | Ocala | Ocala Union Station | | junction with: Kendrick Spur; Atlantic Coast Line Railroad High Springs—Croom Line |
| FL | SQ 742.7 | Kendrick | Kendrick | | located on Kendrick Spur |
| FL | S 743.5 | Santos | Santos | | |
| FL | S 747.1 | Belleview | Belleview | | |
| FL | S 752.0 | Summerfield | Summerfield | | junction with Lake Weir Spur |
| FL | SS 758.3 | Weirsdale | Weirsdale | | located on Lake Weir Spur |
| FL | S 756.8 | Oxford | Oxford | | |
| FL | S 761.5 | Wildwood | Wildwood | | junction with Orlando Subdivision |
| FL | S 766.1 | Coleman | Coleman | | junction with Miami Subdivision |
| FL | S 770.4 | Lake Panasoffkee | Lake Panasoffkee | | |
| FL | S 771.0 | | Ekal | | also known as Sumterville Junction |
| FL | S 775.1 | Bushnell | Bushnell | | |
| FL | S 778.9 | St. Catherine | St. Catherine | | junction with Atlantic Coast Line Railroad High Springs—Croom Line |
| FL | S 783.2 | | Rerdell | | |
| FL | S 791.2 | Lacoochee | Lacoochee | | junction with Orange Belt Railway (ACL) |
| FL | S 791.9 | Owensboro | Owensboro | | junction with Atlantic Coast Line Railroad High Springs—Lakeland Line |
| FL | S 797.9 | Dade City | Dade City | | |
| FL | S 808.0 | Zephyrhills | Zephyrhills | | junction with Atlantic Coast Line Railroad Vitis–Tampa Line |
| FL | S 811.4 | Crystal Springs | Crystal Springs | | |
| FL | S 818.5 | Knights | Knights | | |
| FL | S 822.8 | Plant City | Sandler Junction | | junction with Plant City Subdivision |
| FL | S 823.1 | Plant City | Plant City Union Depot | | junction with Atlantic Coast Line Railroad Main Line |
| FL | S 823.2 | Plant City | Lake Wales Junction | | junction with Plant City Branch |
| FL | S 827.4 | Turkey Creek | Turkey Creek | | junction with Sarasota Subdivision |
| FL | S 829.5 | Sydney | Sydney | | |
| FL | S 832.5 | Valrico | Valrico | | also known as Valrico Junction junction with Valrico Subdivision |
| FL | S 834.8 | Brandon | Brandon | | |
| FL | S 835.8 | Brandon | Limona | | |
| FL | S 840.9 | Tampa | Yeoman | | junction with Atlantic Coast Line Railroad Tampa—Sarasota Line |
| FL | S 843.5 | Tampa | Gary | | also known as Tampa Northern Junction junction with Seaboard Air Line Railroad Tampa Subdivision |
| FL | S 844.9 | Tampa | Tampa Union Station | | replaced original station located at Franklin and Whiting Streets |
| FL | S 845.6 | Tampa | Seddon Island Terminal | | Freight terminal built in 1909 |
