= Bellwood Subdivision =

CSX railroad line in Virginia

The Bellwood Subdivision is a railroad line owned by CSX Transportation in Virginia, United States. The line runs along CSX's S Line from Richmond, Virginia, to Bellwood, Virginia, for a total of 14.4 miles (23.2 km). At its north end the line continues south from the Richmond Terminal Subdivision and at its south end the line continues south as the North End Subdivision.

== History ==
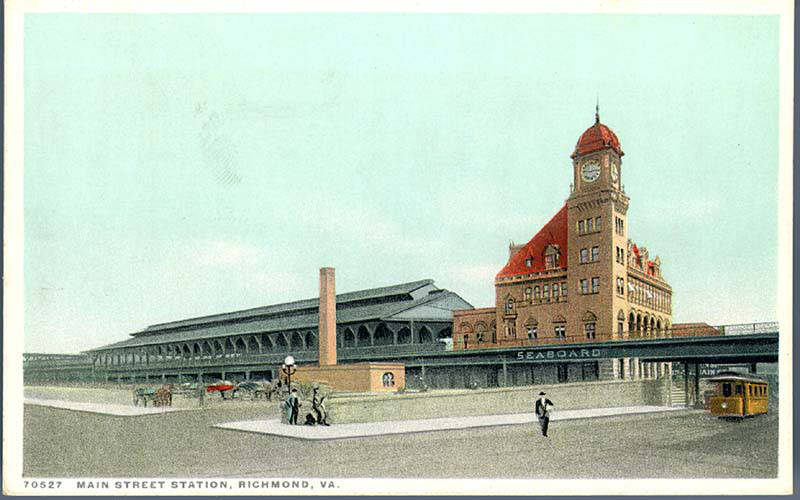
Postcard of the line at the historic Main Street Station

The line was once the northernmost segment of the Seaboard Air Line Railroad's main line (which is now CSX's S Line). Seaboard affiliate Richmond, Petersburg and Carolina Railroad originally built the line between 1898 and 1900. Seaboard designated the segment of the main line from Richmond to Raleigh as the Richmond Subdivision.

The Seaboard Air Line Railroad merged with the Atlantic Coast Line Railroad in 1967 with the merged company becoming the Seaboard Coast Line Railroad. The Seaboard Coast Line abandoned the S Line past Centralia (where it merges with the A Line) to Norlina, North Carolina in after the merger in favor of trains using the A Line. The line from Centralia to Richmond was then known as the Collier Subdivision.

In 1980, the Seaboard Coast Line's parent company merged with the Chessie System, creating the CSX Corporation. The CSX Corporation initially operated the Chessie and Seaboard Systems separately until 1986, when they were merged into CSX Transportation. The S Line from Centralia to Richmond was then known as the Bellwood Subdivision as it is today. As of today, the next active segment of the S Line south is CSX's Norlina Subdivision.

== Features ==
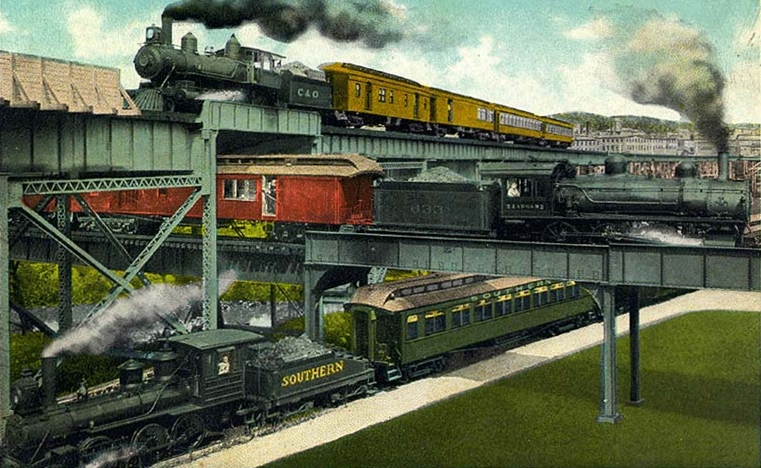
Triple Crossing in 1919

One of the line's notable features is that it runs past two of Richmond's historic railroad stations: Main Street Station, and Broad Street Station. Another feature is that it runs through Richmond's Triple Crossing, a rare instance of three railroad lines crossing at different levels. The Bellwood Subdivision passes through the middle level of the Triple Crossing. The line's bridge over the James River is also a notable feature which dates back to the Seaboard Air Line Railroad.

== See also ==
- List of CSX Transportation lines
