= Butterworth, Virginia =

Unincorporated community in Virginia, United States

- Unincorporated community
- Location within Virginia Location within the United States
- Coordinates: 37°03′05″N 77°37′37″W
- Country: United States
- State: Virginia
- County: Dinwiddie
- Elevation: 243 ft (74 m)
- Time zone: UTC-5 (Eastern (EST))
  - Summer (DST): UTC-4 (EDT)
- Area code: 804
- GNIS feature ID: 1477164

Butterworth is an unincorporated community in Dinwiddie County, Virginia, United States.

Butterworth is located along a former railroad mainline. The Richmond, Petersburg and Carolina Railroad, passing through Butterworth from Petersburg to Ridgeway Junction (today Norlina, North Carolina), was completed in 1900, at which point it was merged into the Seaboard Air Line (SAL). By 1914, the population of Butterworth was estimate by the railroad to be somewhere around 400. The line (dubbed the "S-line" after later mergers) continued to operate until the 1980s, and today Butterworth is along the abandoned portion of the CSX Norlina Subdivision.
