= Tanner House =

Tanner House may refer to:

== Places ==
=== United States ===
(by state, then city)

- Tanner Farmhouse, Wilmer, Alabama, listed on the National Register of Historic Places (NRHP)
- William A. Tanner House, Aurora, Illinois, NRHP-listed and in use as the Aurora Historical Museum
- John Tanner House, Petersburg, Kentucky, NRHP-listed
- William C. Tanner House, Falls Township, Ohio, listed on the NRHP in Muskingum County
- Albert H. Tanner House, Portland, Oregon, NRHP-listed
- Henry O. Tanner House, Philadelphia, Pennsylvania, NRHP-listed
- Henry M. Tanner House, Beaver, Utah, listed on the NRHP in Beaver County
- Jake Tanner House, Beaver, Utah, listed on the NRHP in Beaver County
- Sidney Tanner House, Beaver, Utah, listed on the NRHP in Beaver County
- A.N. Tanner House, Grouse Creek, Utah, NRHP-listed
- O.H.P. Tanner House, La Crosse, Virginia, NRHP-listed

== People ==
- Tanner House (hockey player) (born 1986), Canadian ice hockey player

See also

- Tanner Houck (born 1996), American baseball player
