= R2R =

R2R may refer to:

- Record to report, a finance and accounting management process
- R-2R, a configuration of resistor ladder
- Reel-to-reel, Reel-to-reel audio tape recording
- Right to repair
- Right to Reply, a former British television series
- Roll-to-roll, creating electronic devices on flexible rolls
- S-Line Raleigh to Richmond project project, rail infrastructure project in the U.S. states of North Carolina and Virginia
