= S Line =

S Line may refer to:

== Rail transportation ==
- S-Bahn, a type of hybrid urban and suburban railway.
- S-train (Copenhagen), an urban rail network in Copenhagen, Denmark
- Milan S Lines, a commuter rail network in Milan, Italy
- Main Line (Seaboard Air Line Railroad)
  - S-Line Raleigh to Richmond project, a project to restore service to an abandoned portion of the Seaboard Air Line Railroad main line
- S-Line (Norfolk Southern), a railroad line running between North Carolina and Tennessee operated by the Norfolk Southern Railway in the United States
- Sounder commuter rail#S Line, a commuter rail line serving Seattle, Washington, United States
- S Castro Shuttle, a Muni Metro line in San Francisco, California, United States
- S (New York City Subway service), a subway shuttle service in New York City, New York, United States
- S Line (Utah Transit Authority), a streetcar connecting the cities of Salt Lake City and South Salt Lake that is operated by the Utah Transit Authority in Utah, United States
- S (Los Angeles Railway), a former streetcar service in Los Angeles, California

== Other uses ==
- Audi S line, an optional sports trim packages available on various Audi cars
- S Line (ice hockey), a forward line for the Montreal Maroons, a former NHL hockey team
- S Line (TV series), a South Korean 2025 TV series
- Nikon S-line lenses, Nikon branding for especially high-performance ("superior") Z-mount lenses
