= Bracey, Virginia =

- Census-designated place (CDP)
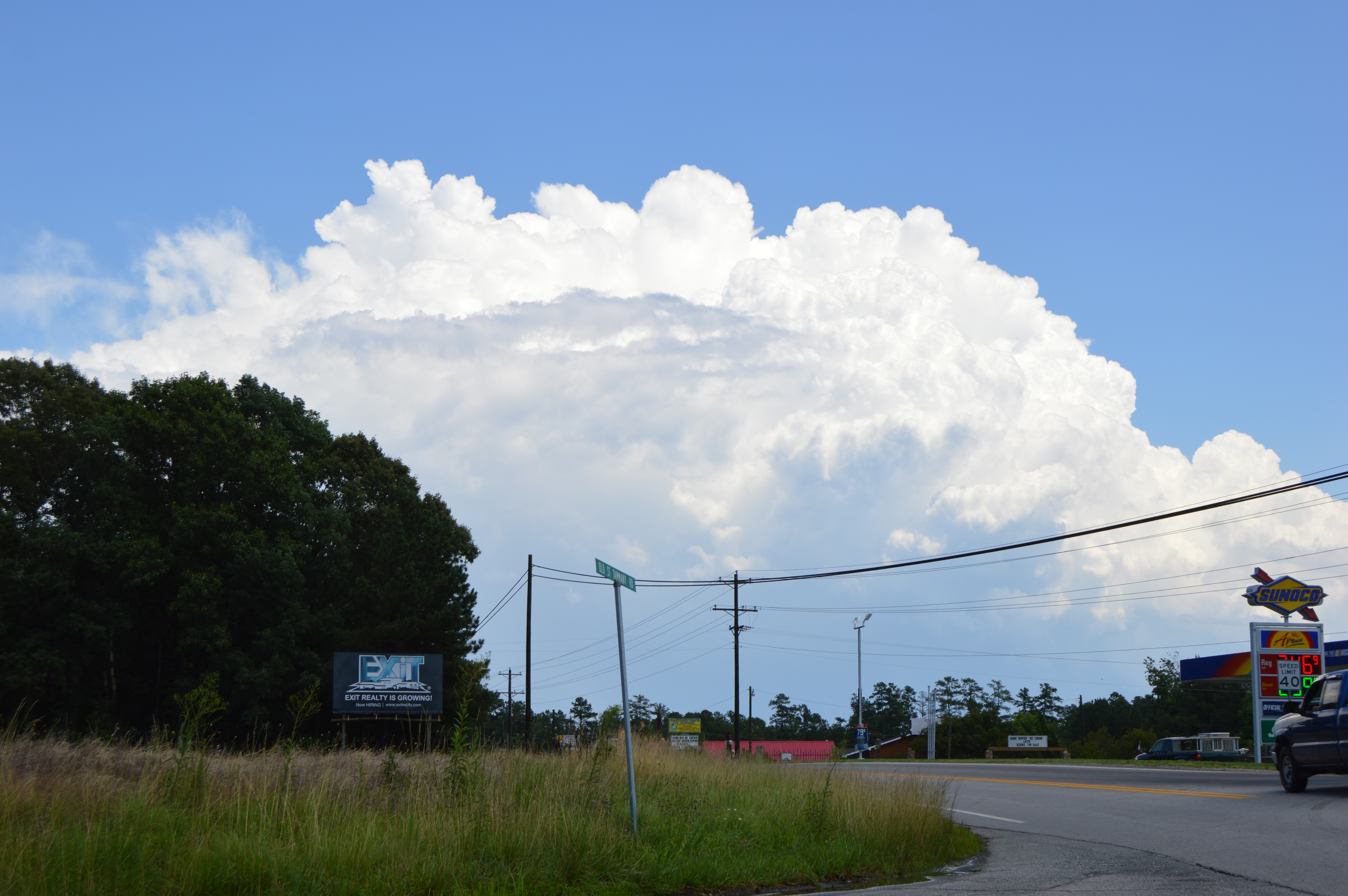
- Looking east from the intersection of Goodes Ferry and Old St. Tammany Roads near Bracey

- Location of Bracey in Virginia
- Coordinates: 36°35′59″N 78°08′35″W
- Country: United States
- State: Virginia
- County: Mecklenburg
- Elevation: 341 ft (104 m)

Population (2020)
  - Total: 1,372
  - Estimate (2024): 1,242
- Time zone: UTC−5 (EST)
  - Summer (DST): UTC−4 (EDT)
- ZIP code: 23919
- Area code: 434
- FIPS code: 51-51117
- GNIS feature ID: 1477137
- Other name: Bracy

Bracey is a census-designated place (CDP) in Mecklenburg County, Virginia, United States. It is located next to South Hill, La Crosse, and Brodnax, which are also in Mecklenburg County. As of the 2020 census, Bracey had a population of 1,372.

== History ==
Bracey is located along a former railroad mainline. The Richmond, Petersburg and Carolina Railroad, passing through Bracey from Petersburg, Virginia to Ridgeway Junction (today Norlina, North Carolina), was completed in 1900, at which point it was merged into the Seaboard Air Line (SAL). The railroad constructed a depot for Bracey, which was still standing as of 2021. By 1914, the population of Bracey was estimate by the railroad to be somewhere around 200. The line (dubbed the "S-line" after later mergers) continued to operate until the 1980s, and today Bracey is along the abandoned portion of the CSX Norlina Subdivision.

== Geography and climate ==
Bracey is located at 36°35′59″N 78°08′35″W (36.599589, −78.143051). It lies 341 feet (104 m) above sea level.

Bracey lies in the Piedmont area of Virginia and has a humid sub-tropical climate generalized by hot, humid summers and cool to chilly winters. The average annual rainfall is 45 inches with winter-time snowfall averaging 3 inches.

== Demographics ==
Historical population
| Census | Pop. | Note | %± |
|---|---|---|---|
| 2020 | 1,372 | | — |
U.S. Decennial Census; 2010 2020

Bracey was first listed as a census designated place in the 2010 U.S. census.

As of the census estimates of 2007, the population of the ZCTA (ZIP Code Tabulation Area) for 23919 was 1,981 people, an increase of 6.02% from the 2000 census. As of July 1, 2020 total population listed is 2539 (100%). Population in Households 2538 (100%). Population in Families 2038(80.3%). Population in Group 1(0.0%). Quarters 1. Population Density 88

== Lake Gaston ==
Bracey is the closest access point to Lake Gaston from Interstate-85. Bracey is home to over 20 businesses and thrives off of visitors to the Lake. It is home to Americamps camping grounds and Poplar Point Marina as well as multiple real estate agencies and two private golf clubs. The lake is popular for its fishing and water sports and is broken into four major quadrants. Bracey is the main town in the North West Quadrant.

== Economy ==
Local industry breakdown by occupation is 44.13% sales and professional, 19.47% construction and maintenance, 15.36% production and transportation, 9.92% foodservice and associated services, 9.67% management and financial services, and 1.45% agriculture.
