= Grandy, Virginia =

Unincorporated community in Virginia, United States

Coordinates: 36°48′02″N 77°57′19″W

Grandy is an unincorporated community located in Brunswick County, in the U.S. state of Virginia.

The settlement is located along a former railroad. The Richmond, Petersburg and Carolina Railroad, passing through Grandy from Petersburg to Ridgeway Junction (today Norlina, North Carolina), was completed in 1900, at which point it was merged into the Seaboard Air Line (SAL). By 1914, there was already a railway station at Grandy, which the railroad estimated had population somewhere around 500. The Seaboard line (dubbed the "S-line" after later mergers) continued to operate until the 1980s, and today Grandy is along the abandoned portion of the CSX Norlina Subdivision.
