= Trintech =

Financial software company

- Type: Private
- Industry: Financial software
- Founded: 1987
- Founder: John McGuire; Cyril McGuire
- Headquarters: Plano, Texas, United States
- Products: Cadency, Adra, DATAFlow, ReconNET, Frontier, Accurate
- Website: www.trintech.com

Trintech is a provider of cloud-based financial software focused on account reconciliation and the financial close (record-to-report) process. Its products are used to automate high-volume transaction matching, balance-sheet reconciliations, close task management, journal entries, and related governance and compliance activities.

The company was founded in Dublin, Ireland, in 1987 by brothers John and Cyril McGuire. Trintech later moved its corporate headquarters to the Dallas area, first establishing offices in Addison, Texas, before relocating to its current headquarters in Plano, Texas.

== History ==
Trintech was established in 1987 in Dublin by John and Cyril McGuire. John McGuire developed the concept for an encrypted point-of-sale service while studying computer science at Trinity College Dublin, and with his brother founded the company to commercialize secure payment and transaction technologies.

In 1999, Trintech became the first Irish firm to be dual-listed on both the Nasdaq and the Neuer Markt in Frankfurt. Following the dot-com crash, press reports in 2002 noted company efforts to avoid potential delisting, including a share buyback programme.

The company expanded its portfolio through acquisitions, including Assurity Technologies (AssureNET) in 2006, Chesapeake System Solutions in 2016, and Adra Software in 2017.

In December 2010, shareholders approved a scheme of arrangement under which Trintech was taken private by Spectrum Equity.

Spectrum held Trintech until 2015, when it announced the company's sale to Vista Equity Partners. Later that year, Trintech received a new investment from Vista's Endeavor Fund to support expansion.

In 2018, Vista sold a majority stake in Trintech to Summit Partners, while retaining a minority interest.

In July 2023, Trintech arranged debt financing of about US$230 million to acquire Fiserv's reconciliation software businesses, Frontier and Accurate. In 2024, media reports indicated its owners were exploring a potential sale of the company, valuing it at around US$2 billion.

== Products ==
Trintech offers software for account reconciliations, transaction matching, close task management, journal entry, and related analytics under the Cadency and Adra platforms, as well as products including DATAFlow, ReconNET and, since 2023, Frontier and Accurate.

== Headquarters ==
Trintech's headquarters are in Plano, Texas (Dallas area); the company also maintains offices in Europe and other regions.
