= Warfield, Virginia =

Census-designated place in Virginia, US

Coordinates: 36°53′45″N 77°49′33″W

Warfield is an unincorporated community and census-designated place (CDP) in Brunswick County, Virginia, United States. As of the 2020 census, Warfield had a population of 104.

The settlement is located along a former railroad. The Richmond, Petersburg and Carolina Railroad, passing through Warfield from Petersburg to Ridgeway Junction (today Norlina, North Carolina), was completed in 1900, at which point it was merged into the Seaboard Air Line (SAL). A railway station was built at some point by 1914, when the population of Warfield was estimated by the railroad to be somewhere around 100. The line (dubbed the "S" line after later mergers) continued to operate until the 1980s, and today Warfield is along the abandoned portion of the CSX Norlina Subdivision .

== Demographics ==
Historical population
Census	Pop.	Note	%±
2010	115		—
2020	104		−9.6%
U.S. Decennial Census; 2010 2020

Warfield was first listed as a census designated place in the 2010 U.S. census.

Warfield CDP, Virginia – Racial and ethnic composition Note: the US Census treats Hispanic/Latino as an ethnic category. This table excludes Latinos from the racial categories and assigns them to a separate category. Hispanics/Latinos may be of any race.
Race / Ethnicity (NH = Non-Hispanic)	Pop 2010	Pop 2020	% 2010	% 2020
White alone (NH)	27	28	23.48%	26.92%
Black or African American alone (NH)	86	72	74.78%	69.23%
Native American or Alaska Native alone (NH)	0	0	0.00%	0.00%
Asian alone (NH)	0	1	0.00%	0.96%
Native Hawaiian or Pacific Islander alone (NH)	0	0	0.00%	0.00%
Other race alone (NH)	0	0	0.00%	0.00%
Mixed race or Multiracial (NH)	2	3	1.74%	2.88%
Hispanic or Latino (any race)	0	0	0.00%	0.00%
Total	115	104	100.00%	100.00%
