= S-Line Raleigh to Richmond project =

Richmond-Raleigh railroad

The S-Line Raleigh to Richmond (R2R) project is a project to reconstruct part of the Seaboard Air Line Railroad main line in the U.S. states of North Carolina and Virginia. The line will be owned by the respective states' departments of transportation and served by Amtrak, and will provide a more direct service between Richmond and Raleigh when completed. The line is estimated to have served 25 million people by 2040. The track speed, which is currently at 30 mph (48 km/h) for freight trains and 25 mph (40 km/h) for passenger trains, will be upgraded so that passenger trains can have a top speed of 79 mph (127 km/h) from Richmond, Virginia to Centralia, Virginia, 90 mph (140 km/h) from Centralia to Collier (a location south of Petersburg, Virginia), and to 110 mph (180 km/h) from Collier to Raleigh, North Carolina.

== History ==
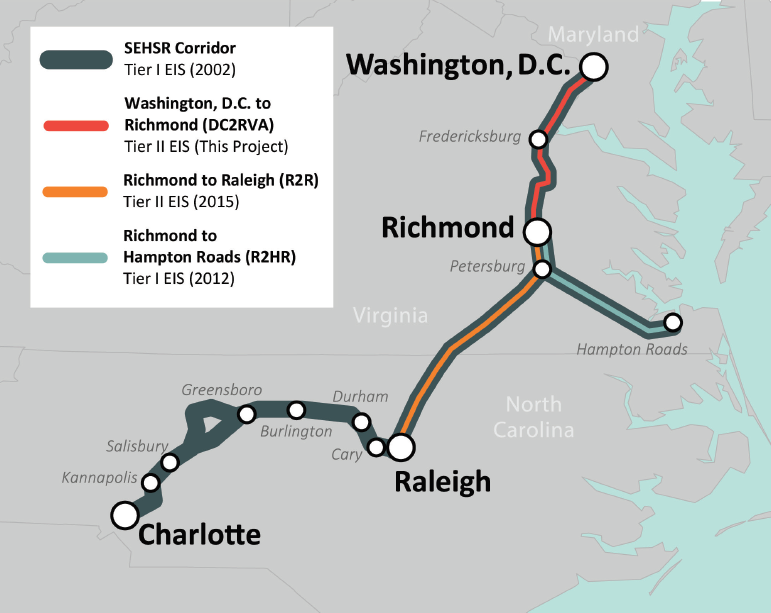
The S-Line, seen in orange.

The line was proposed by the Virginia and Carolina Railroad in 1882 to the Virginia General Assembly and was granted a charter. The railroad sold the charter to the city of Petersburg and began construction between Petersburg and Ridgeway Junction. In 1897, the Virginia and Carolina Railroad was purchased by the city of Petersburg, which renamed it to the Richmond, Petersburg and Carolina Railroad. The line line from Richmond to Ridgeway Junction began construction that year, and was opened in May 1900. On April 10, 1900, however, just a month before the railroad opened, the company was merged into the broader Seaboard Air Line Railway, and the line became the northernmost section of the Seaboard Air Line main line between Richmond and Tampa.

In 1967, the railroad merged with the Atlantic Coast Railroad to form the Seaboard Coast Line Railroad. The Seaboard Air Line main line would be known as the S-Line. The Seaboard Coast Line Railroad decided to abandon the section of the main line between Centralia and Petersburg and opted for consolidated operations on the former Atlantic Coast Railroad main line known as the "A-Line". The section from Raleigh to Norlina would be known as the Norlina Subdivision.

In 1987, after the Seaboard System, the SCL's successor, merged with the Chessie System to form CSX Transportation the previous year, CSX officially abandoned the Norlina Subdivision north of Norlina. CSX continued to own the abandoned Norlina Subdivision trackage from Norlina to Petersburg until it was purchased by the states of Virginia and North Carolina in the early 2020s.

In the 1990s, the federal government designated five high-speed rail corridors under the Intermodal Surface Transportation Efficiency Act. The S-Line was incorporated as a part of the Southeast High Speed Rail Corridor.

== Construction ==
The North Carolina Department of Transportation completed the final environmental impact statement (FEIS) with the Virginia Department of Rail and Public Transportation in 2015. The Federal Railroad Administration issued a record of decision (ROD) in 2017. In 2020, North Carolina and Virginia agreed to purchase the entire abandoned right of way between Centralia and Norlina for $47.5 million as a condition of a $58 million grant by the FRA Consolidated Rail Infrastructure and Safety Improvements Program.

In 2021, the FRA provided a $57.9 million grant for a land survey and preliminary engineering from Raleigh to Richmond. In November 2022, the USDOT funded an NCDOT study on transit-oriented development (TOD) near the line, followed by a Federal Transit Administration-funded study on TOD in 2023.

In 2023, the Federal Railroad Administration under the Biden Administration would provide a $1.09 billion grant for the project, as a part of the Infrastructure Investment and Jobs Act. The North Carolina Department of Transportation would provide another $1.09 billion grant.

The Federal Railroad Administration Federal-State Partnership for Intercity Passenger Rail would fund the design and construction for the initial segment of the S-Line, also known as the Norlina Subdivision. Stations would be built at Wake Forest, Henderson, and Norlina. The North Carolina Department of Transportation originally envisioned a start date between 2025 and 2029 for this initial phase. On July 1, 2024, then-United States secretary of transportation Pete Buttigieg, along with other state officials, participated in the groundbreaking of the project, commencing construction. In 2026, $550 million in funding was released to the state of North Carolina for this project.
