= CSX Bellwood Subdivision James River Bridge =

- Coordinates: 37°31′53″N 77°25′54″W
- Carries: Bellwood Subdivision
- Crosses: Richmond District (Norfolk Southern), James River
- Locale: Richmond, Virginia

Characteristics
- Design: Plate girder
- Total length: 1,400 feet (430 m)

History
- Construction start: 1899
- Construction end: April 1900

Location
- Interactive map of CSX Bellwood Subdivision James River Bridge

The CSX Bellwood Subdivision James River Bridge is a plate girder bridge that carries the Bellwood Subdivision over the James River in Richmond, Virginia. The bridge was built by the Colonial Construction Company using steel from the Pennsylvania Steel Company for the Richmond, Petersburg and Carolina Railroad from 1899 to mid April 1900. This bridge was the last link in the long north to south railroad line that became the Seaboard Air Line Railroad.

The bridge begins just south of the Main Street Station and constitutes the middle part of the Triple Crossing, going under the Rivanna Subdivision and over the Richmond District (Norfolk Southern) prior to crossing the James River.
