= Cochran, Virginia =

Unincorporated community in Virginia, United States

Coordinates: 36°50′36″N 77°54′18″W

Cochran is an unincorporated community located in Brunswick County, in the U.S. state of Virginia.

The settlement is located along a former railroad. The Richmond, Petersburg and Carolina Railroad, passing through Cochran from Petersburg to Ridgeway Junction (today Norlina, North Carolina), was completed in 1900, at which point it was merged into the Seaboard Air Line (SAL). By 1914, the population of Cochran was estimated by the railroad to be somewhere around 200. The Seaboard line (dubbed the "S-line" after later mergers) continued to operate until the 1980s, and today Cochran is along the abandoned portion of the CSX Norlina Subdivision.
