= Maclin =

Maclin is both a given name and a surname. Notable people with the name include:

- Maclin Cody (born 1972), American football player
- Arlene Maclin (born 1945), American physicist
- Jeremy Maclin (born 1988), American football player
- Lonnie Maclin (born 1967), American baseball player

== See also ==
- Macklin (surname)
