= La Crosse Hotel =

Historic hotel in Virginia, US

- U.S. National Register of Historic Places
- Virginia Landmarks Register
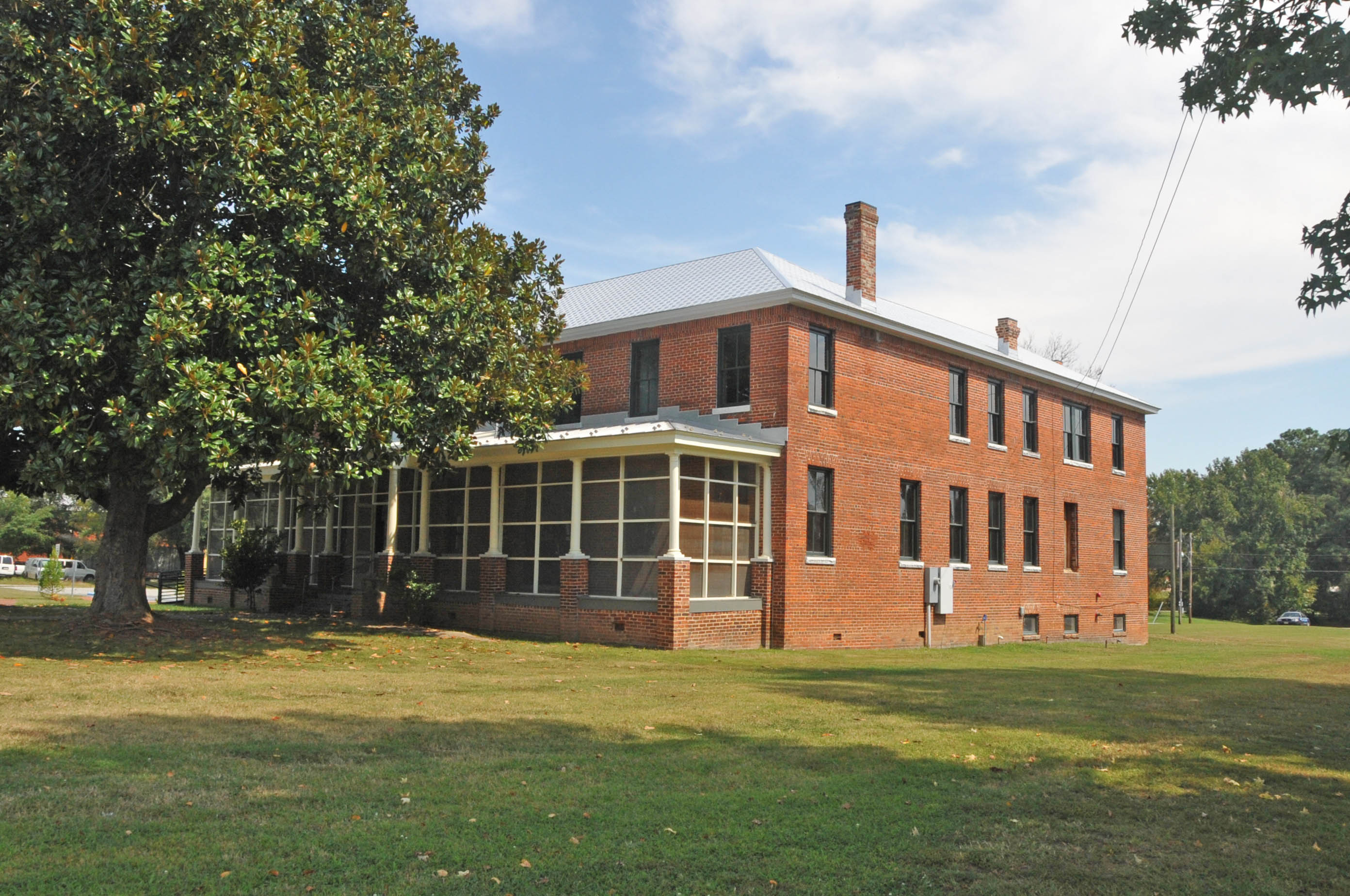

- Location within Virginia Location within the United States
- Location: 201 Central Ave., La Crosse, Virginia
- Coordinates: 36°41′51″N 78°5′35″W
- Area: 1.1 acres (0.45 ha)
- Built: 1917
- Architectural style: Colonial Revival
- NRHP reference No.: 08000876
- VLR No.: 250-5001-0003

Significant dates
- Added to NRHP: September 12, 2008
- Designated VLR: June 19, 2008

La Crosse Hotel is a historic hotel building located at La Crosse, Mecklenburg County, Virginia. It was built in 1917, and is a two-story, eight-bay, brick building with a rear ell and a hipped roof covered with standing seam metal and pressed metal shingles. The front façade features a full-width front porch combining Colonial Revival and American Craftsman details.

It was listed on the National Register of Historic Places in 2008.
