= Rawlings, Virginia =

Unincorporated community in Virginia, United States

Coordinates: 36°56′55″N 77°46′44″W

Rawlings is an unincorporated community located in Brunswick County, in the U.S. state of Virginia. The population for Rawlings, VA was 456 at the 2000 census. Rawlings is home of Lake Phoenix, a scuba park and family campground close to Davis Travel Center.

Rawlings is located along a former railroad mainline. The Richmond, Petersburg and Carolina Railroad, passing through Rawlings from Petersburg, Virginia to Ridgeway Junction (today Norlina, North Carolina), was completed in 1900, at which point it was merged into the Seaboard Air Line (SAL). By 1914, the population of Rawlings was estimate by the railroad to be somewhere around 100. The line (dubbed the "S-line" after later mergers) continued to operate until the 1980s, and today Rawlings is along the abandoned portion of the CSX Norlina Subdivision.

== Demographics ==
As previously stated, the 2000 census states there are 456 people. There are also 194 households with an average income of $66,088. The racial makeup of Rawlings, VA is 45% African American, 54% White, and < 1% Hispanic and Asian races.
