= Arlene Maclin =

American physicist and education administrator

Arlene P. Maclin
- Born: June 7, 1945 (age 81); Rawlings, Virginia
- Education: North Carolina Agricultural and Technical State University (BS); University of Virginia (MS); Howard University (PhD)
- Scientific career
- Fields: Physics; Education

Arlene Paige Maclin is an American physicist and academic administrator. Maclin was one of the first African American women to receive a PhD in physics. She is a professor at Howard University.

== Early life and education ==
Maclin was born in Rawlings, Virginia on June 7, 1945. She earned her B.S. in engineering physics from North Carolina Agricultural and Technical State University in 1967. She was an undergraduate research assistant. After graduating, she spent time as a post-baccalaureate fellow at Bryn Mawr and Haverford Colleges.

She completed a M.S. in theoretical nuclear physics from the University of Virginia in 1971, and a Ph.D. in theoretical solid state physics from Howard University in 1974.

== Career ==
Maclin was a research scientist at MIT's Lincoln Laboratory and a visiting scientist at Oak Ridge National Laboratory before she was appointed to serve as program director at the National Science Foundation in 1980. Between 1981 and 1983, she served as Senior Applied Research Physicist at the Central Intelligence Agency.

Maclin is a professor at Howard University. She has also served as an academic administrator at Morgan State University and Hampton University. She served as Delta Sigma Theta Distinguished Professor at Bennett University. She has developed an optical engineering program at Norfolk State University with a graduation rate of 96% and a high-quality laboratory equipment. She has developed science education programs for elementary and high school students as well, and collaborated with educators abroad to improve student retention in scientific fields. Based on successful models at Howard University, she presented results to the Department of Education to apply throughout the United States. Initiatives including pairing incoming students with those in the graduating class and creating more research project opportunities.

Maclin acts as a mentor to undergraduate students, encouraging them to accept internship opportunities and helping them to find such positions. Though physics undergraduate classes are gradually becoming more diverse, faculty makeup at major institutions does not always reflect this change and Maclin believes that students should work together to support each other to create an environment that is comfortable for all. Minority students leave physics because they feel isolated and out of place, not because they are struggling academically.

She has represented the United States in delegations to the International Conference on Women in Physics. As early as 1975, Maclin delivered public lectures about computers and privacy issues.

== Research and publications ==
Maclin's research covers topics like fiber optical-electronic systems to achieve optical switching in semiconductors.

- Tsang T, Maclin AP. Velocity autocorrelation functions in model liquid metals. Physical Review A. 1975 Jan 1;11(1):360. According to Google Scholar, it has been cited 7 times.
- Maclin AP, Eisenberg JM. Charge-Exchange Scattering of Pions on 14N. Canadian Journal of Physics. 1971 Jul 1;49(13):1826-7 According to Google Scholar, this article has been cited 1 time
- Maclin AP. Work in progress-Globalization of science and engineering programs at Norfolk State University. In 2007 37th Annual Frontiers In Education Conference-Global Engineering: Knowledge Without Borders, Opportunities Without Passports 2007 Oct 10 (pp. T2A-16). IEEE.

== Awards and honours ==
- 2018 Diversity & Inclusion Advocacy Recognition from the Optical Society.
- 2023 Howard Barnhill Distinguished Alumni Service Award from North Carolina Agricultural & State University
- 2025 Fellow of the American Physical Society
