= Albert H. Tanner House =

Historic building in Portland, Oregon, U.S.

- U.S. National Register of Historic Places
- U.S. Historic district – Contributing property
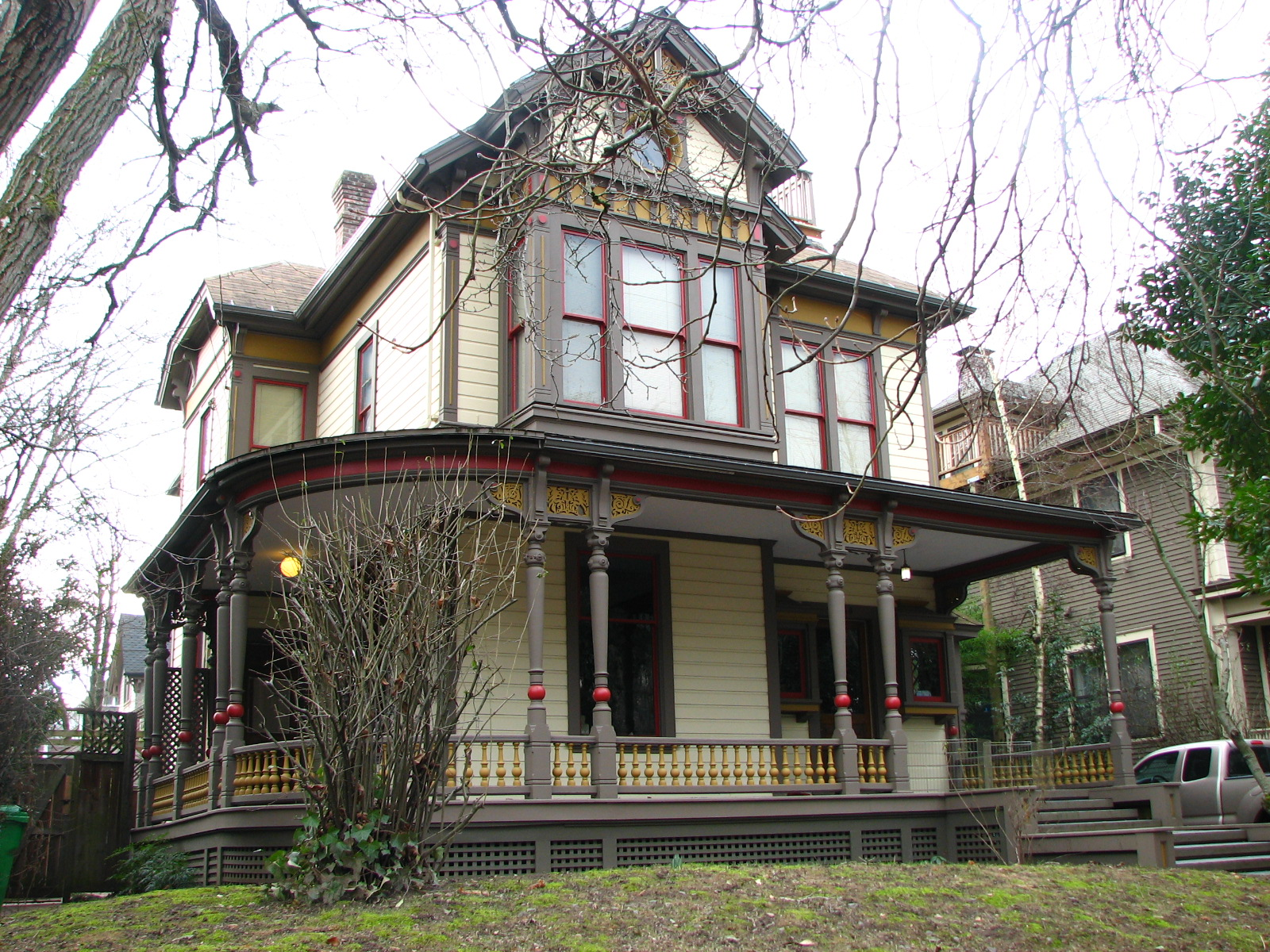

- Location within Oregon Location within the United States
- Location: 2248 NW Johnson Street; Portland, Oregon
- Coordinates: 45°31′41″N 122°41′51″W
- Built: 1893
- Architectural style: Stick/Eastlake
- Part of: Alphabet Historic District (ID00001293)
- NRHP reference No.: 83002175
- Added to NRHP: March 11, 1983

The Albert H. Tanner House is a Stick–Eastlake style house located at 2248 Northwest Johnson Street in Portland, Oregon. It was built in 1893 and has been listed on the National Register of Historic Places since 1983.

== See also ==
- National Register of Historic Places listings in Northwest Portland, Oregon
