= O.H.P. Tanner House =

Historic house in Virginia, United States

- U.S. National Register of Historic Places
- Virginia Landmarks Register
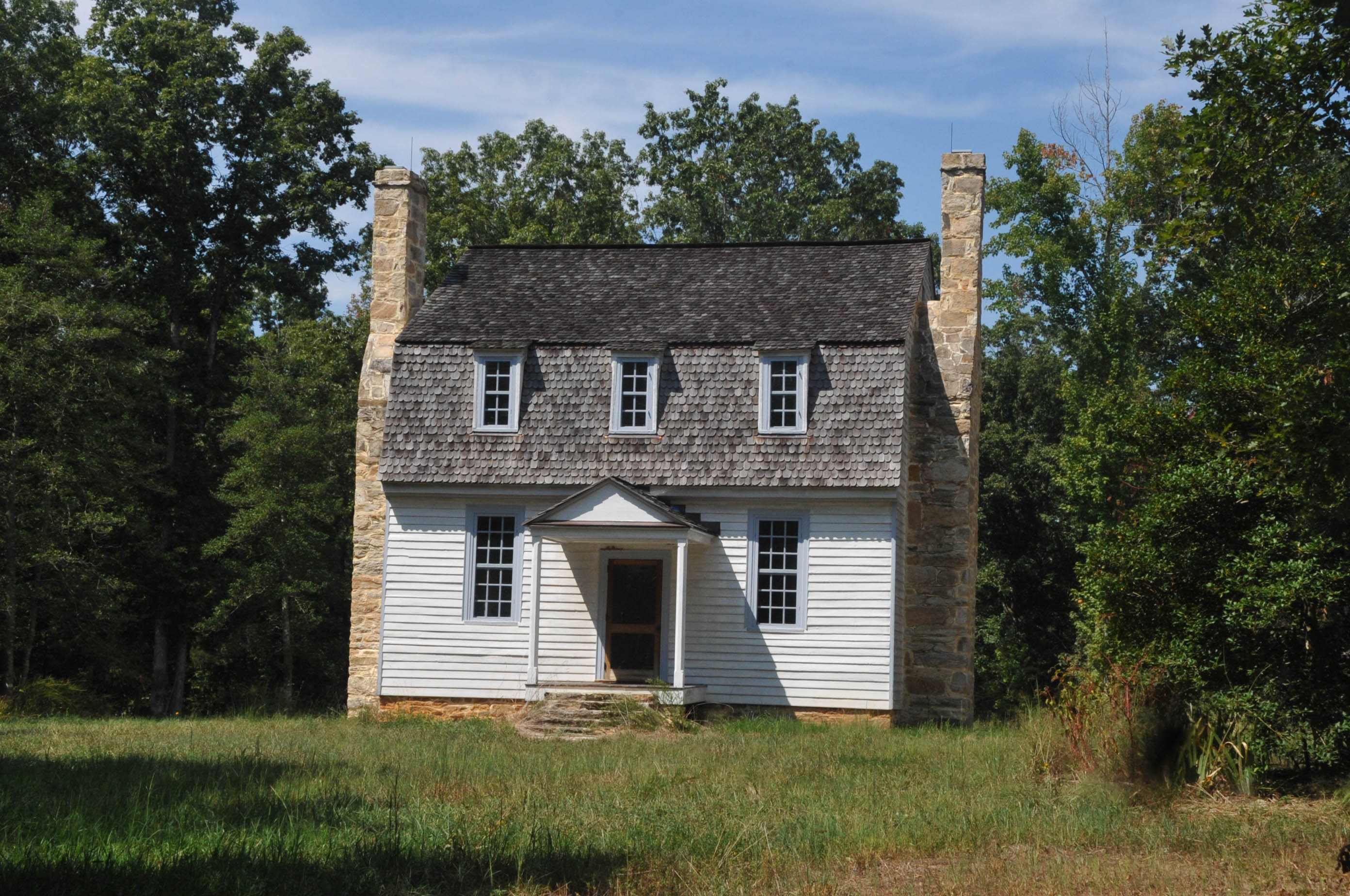
- House in 2013

- Location within Virginia Location within the United States
- Location: 3199 Old St. Tammany Rd., La Crosse, Virginia
- Coordinates: 36°41′51″N 78°5′35″W
- Area: Less than one acre
- Built: c. 1769, c. 1820, c. 1923
- Architectural style: Georgian
- NRHP reference No.: 11000606
- VLR No.: 058-5108

Significant dates
- Added to NRHP: August 26, 2011
- Designated VLR: June 16, 2011

O.H.P. Tanner House, locally known as the Old Courthouse, is a historic home located at La Crosse, Mecklenburg County, Virginia. It was built about 1769, and is a 1 1/2-story, 28-foot square, gambrel-roofed, double-pile Georgian style frame dwelling. The house was remodeled about 1820, and a rear ell added about 1923. It was moved to its present location in 2006, and a substantial rehabilitation was completed in 2009.

It was listed on the National Register of Historic Places in 2011.
