= Seaboard, Virginia =

- Unincorporated community
- Location within Virginia Location within the United States
- Coordinates: 37°8′25″N 81°46′56″W
- Country: United States
- State: Virginia
- County: Tazewell
- Elevation: 2,257 ft (688 m)
- Time zone: UTC-5 (Eastern (EST))
  - Summer (DST): UTC-4 (EDT)
- GNIS feature ID: 1496192

Seaboard is an unincorporated community and coal town located in Tazewell County, Virginia, United States. It has also been known as Big Creek.
