= Richmond, Petersburg and Carolina Railroad =

- Original route (click to enlarge)

Overview
- Locale: Virginia; North Carolina
- Successor: Seaboard Air Line Railroad; Seaboard Coast Line Railroad; CSX Transportation

Technical
- Track gauge: 4 ft 8 1/2 in (1,435 mm) standard gauge
- Previous gauge: 4 ft 8 in (1,422 mm)

The Richmond, Petersburg and Carolina Railroad was a railroad built in the early 1900s. As its name suggests, it ran from Richmond, Virginia south through Petersburg into northern North Carolina. It was a key part of the network of the Seaboard Air Line Railroad.

== History ==
The Richmond, Petersburg and Carolina Railroad was chartered in 1882 by the Virginia General Assembly and was initially known as the Virginia and Carolina Railroad. After it was chartered, the railroad did not have the financial resources to begin construction. In 1897, the charter was sold to the city of Petersburg who renamed it the Richmond, Petersburg and Carolina Railroad and construction started.

The line's planned southern terminus in North Carolina was at Ridgeway Junction (known today as Norlina). Here, it would connect to the Raleigh and Gaston Railroad. The Raleigh and Gaston Railroad, the Seaboard and Roanoke Railroad and other railroads were part of a system of railroads that was marketed as the Seaboard Air Line system, which operated from Portsmouth, Virginia east and south to Raleigh, North Carolina and continued south. In 1898, the Seaboard Air Line system bought the unfinished Richmond, Petersburg and Carolina Railroad to connect their system to Richmond.

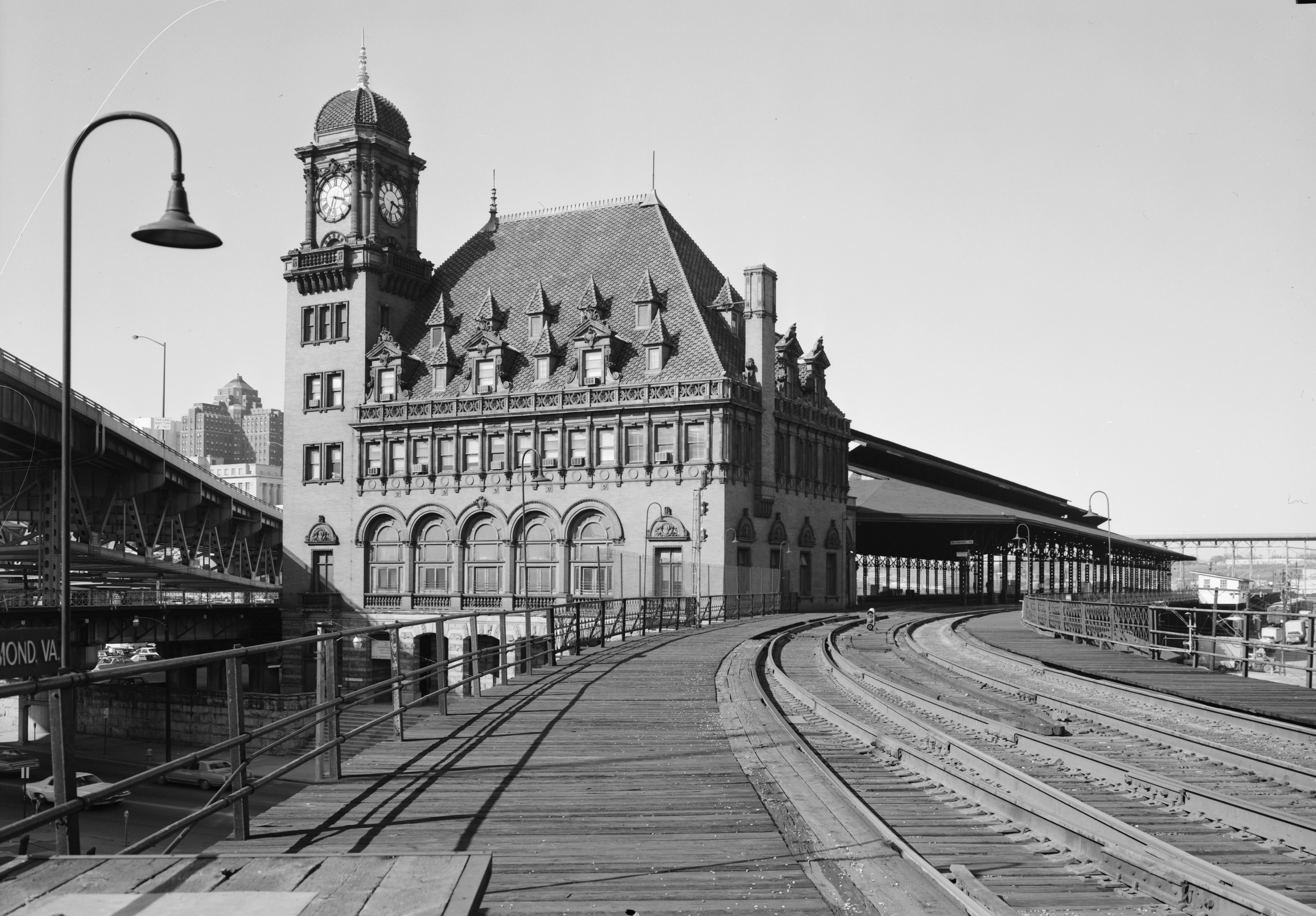
Richmond Main Street Station at the north end of the line

The Richmond, Petersburg and Carolina Railroad was completed in 1900. That same year, the railroads of the Seaboard Air Line system all officially merged into the Seaboard Air Line Railway (SAL). The SAL established their headquarters in Richmond, and the Richmond, Petersburg and Carolina Railroad would become the northernmost segment of SAL's main line (which continued south to Raleigh via the former Raleigh and Gaston Railroad).

In 1901, the SAL built Richmond Main Street Station along with the Chesapeake and Ohio Railway (C&O) at the north end of the line.

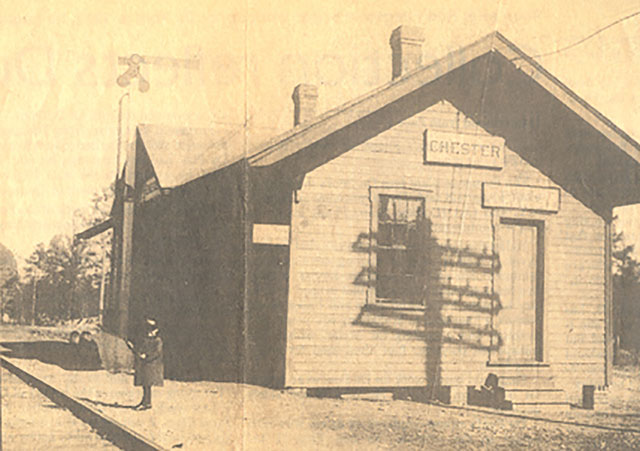
Chester Station in 1914

In 1967, the SAL merged with its rival, the Atlantic Coast Line Railroad (ACL). The merged company was named the Seaboard Coast Line Railroad (SCL). After the merger, the ex-SAL main line became known as the S Line in the combined network (whereas, the ex-ACL main line, which ran parallel just to the west of the S Line, was then known as the A Line). In the wake of the merger, SCL abandoned the S Line between Centralia (just north of Chester) and Collier Yard (just south of Petersburg) and consolidated operations on the A Line. The remaining S Line south of Petersburg was then known as the Norlina Subdivision.

In 1980, the Seaboard Coast Line's parent company merged with the Chessie System (successor of the Chesapeake and Ohio Railway), creating the CSX Corporation. The CSX Corporation initially operated the Chessie and Seaboard Systems separately until 1986, when they were merged into CSX Transportation. Also in 1986, CSX abandoned more of the S Line from Petersburg to Norlina, North Carolina, essentially all remaining track of the original Richmond, Petersburg and Carolina Railroad south of Petersburg. However, remnants of the line remain, including a number of tall concrete bridge piers that supported the bridge over the Appomattox River in Petersburg.

== Future ==
Despite the abandonment of the line, CSX continued to own the right of way for many years. In late 2019, CSX agreed to sell the right of way to the states of Virginia and North Carolina. The states are considering rebuilding the line for high-speed passenger service as part of the Southeast High Speed Rail Corridor.

== Station listing ==
State	Milepost	City/Location	Station	Connections and notes
VA	SRN 3.9	Richmond	Hermitage	junction with Richmond, Fredericksburg and Potomac Railroad
VA	SRN 0.0; S 0.0	Richmond	Main Street Station	Amtrak Northeast Regional originally opened in 1901 closed in 1950s with service relocated to Broad Street Station reopened in 2003 junction at Triple Crossing with: Chesapeake and Ohio Railway; Richmond and York River Railroad (SOU)
VA	S 0.7	Richmond	Manchester	junction with Richmond and Danville Railroad (SOU)
VA	S 8.6	Bellwood	Bellwood	
VA	S 13.0	Chester	Chester	junction with Atlantic Coast Line Railroad Main Line
VA	S 18.7		Lynch	
VA	S 22.9	Petersburg	Petersburg	
VA	S 31.1	Burgess	Burgess	
VA	S 37.5	Dinwiddie	Dinwiddie	
VA	S 40.2	Butterworth	Butterworth	
VA	S 41.8	DeWitt	DeWitt	
VA	S 47.6	McKenney	McKenney	
VA	S 52.2	Rawlings	Rawlings	
VA	S 54.2	Kress	Kress	
VA	S 57.1	Warfield	Warfield	
VA	S 61.1	Alberta	Alberta	junction with Virginian Railway (N&W)
VA	S 63.9	Cochran	Cochran	
VA	S 67.8	Grandy	Grandy	
VA	S 74.0		Skelton	
VA	S 79.0	La Crosse	La Crosse	junction with Atlantic and Danville Railway (N&W)
VA	S 83.7		Hagood	
VA	S 86.4	Bracey	Bracey	
NC	S 91.0		Paschall	
NC	S 94.9	Wise	Wise	
NC	S 98.4	Norlina	Norlina	originally Ridgeway Junction junction with Raleigh and Gaston Railroad (SAL)
