= La Crosse, Virginia =

- Town
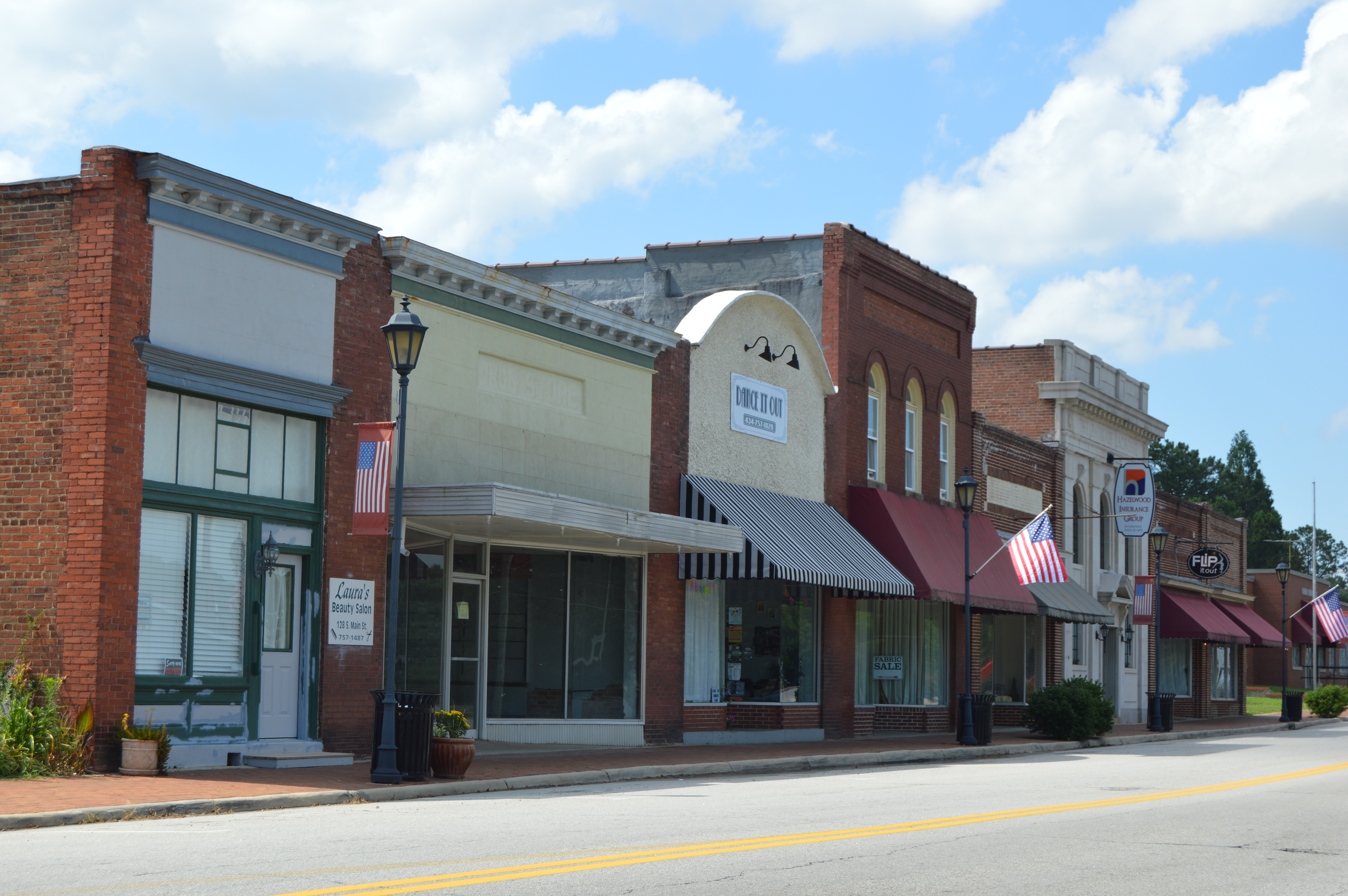

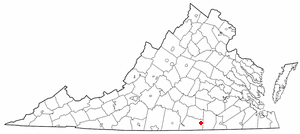
- Location of La Crosse, Virginia
- Coordinates: 36°41′50″N 78°5′32″W
- Country: United States
- State: Virginia
- County: Mecklenburg
- Incorporated: 1901

Government
  - Mayor: Robert M. Tanner

Area
  - Total: 1.22 sq mi (3.17 km^{2})
  - Land: 1.22 sq mi (3.17 km^{2})
  - Water: 0 sq mi (0.00 km^{2})
- Elevation: 476 ft (145 m)

Population (2020)
  - Total: 614
  - Density: 502/sq mi (194/km^{2})
- Time zone: UTC-5 (Eastern (EST))
  - Summer (DST): UTC-4 (EDT)
- ZIP code: 23950
- Area code: 434
- FIPS code: 51-43176
- GNIS feature ID: 1495802
- Website: Official Website

La Crosse is a town in Mecklenburg County, Virginia, United States. Its name is derived from the fact that it was a place where railroads once crossed, and there is still a caboose in the center of the town. La Crosse is adjacent to the neighboring town South Hill.

The town's population was 614 at the 2020 census.

== History ==
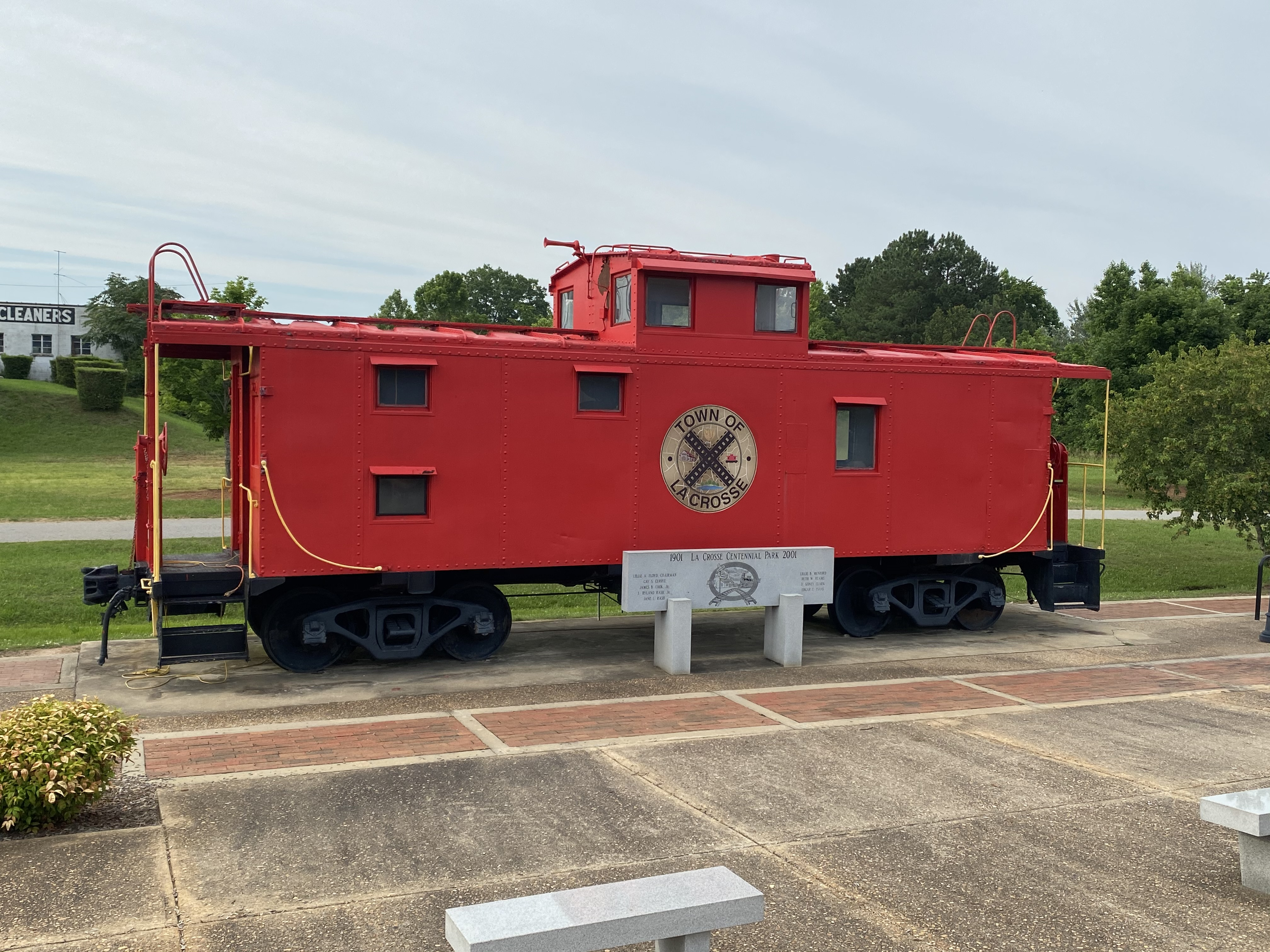
Antique caboose in Centennial Park

Before 1890, La Crosse was known as Piney Pond. The La Crosse Hotel and O.H.P. Tanner House are listed on the National Register of Historic Places. La Crosse was a stop on the Atlantic and Danville Railway. The Virginia General Assembly chartered the People's Warehouse Company in 1902 in La Crosse. The company was formed for selling tobacco. Today, the Tobacco Heritage Trail runs through the town on the old Atlantic and Danville Railway.

== Geography ==
La Crosse is located at 36°41′50″N 78°5′32″W (36.697177, -78.092322).

According to the United States Census Bureau, the town has a total area of 1.2 square miles (3.0 km^{2}), all land.

== Demographics ==
Historical population
Census	Pop.	Note	%±
1910	281		—
1920	320		13.9%
1930	427		33.4%
1940	524		22.7%
1950	675		28.8%
1960	726		7.6%
1970	674		−7.2%
1980	734		8.9%
1990	549		−25.2%
2000	618		12.6%
2010	604		−2.3%
2020	614		1.7%
U.S. Decennial Census

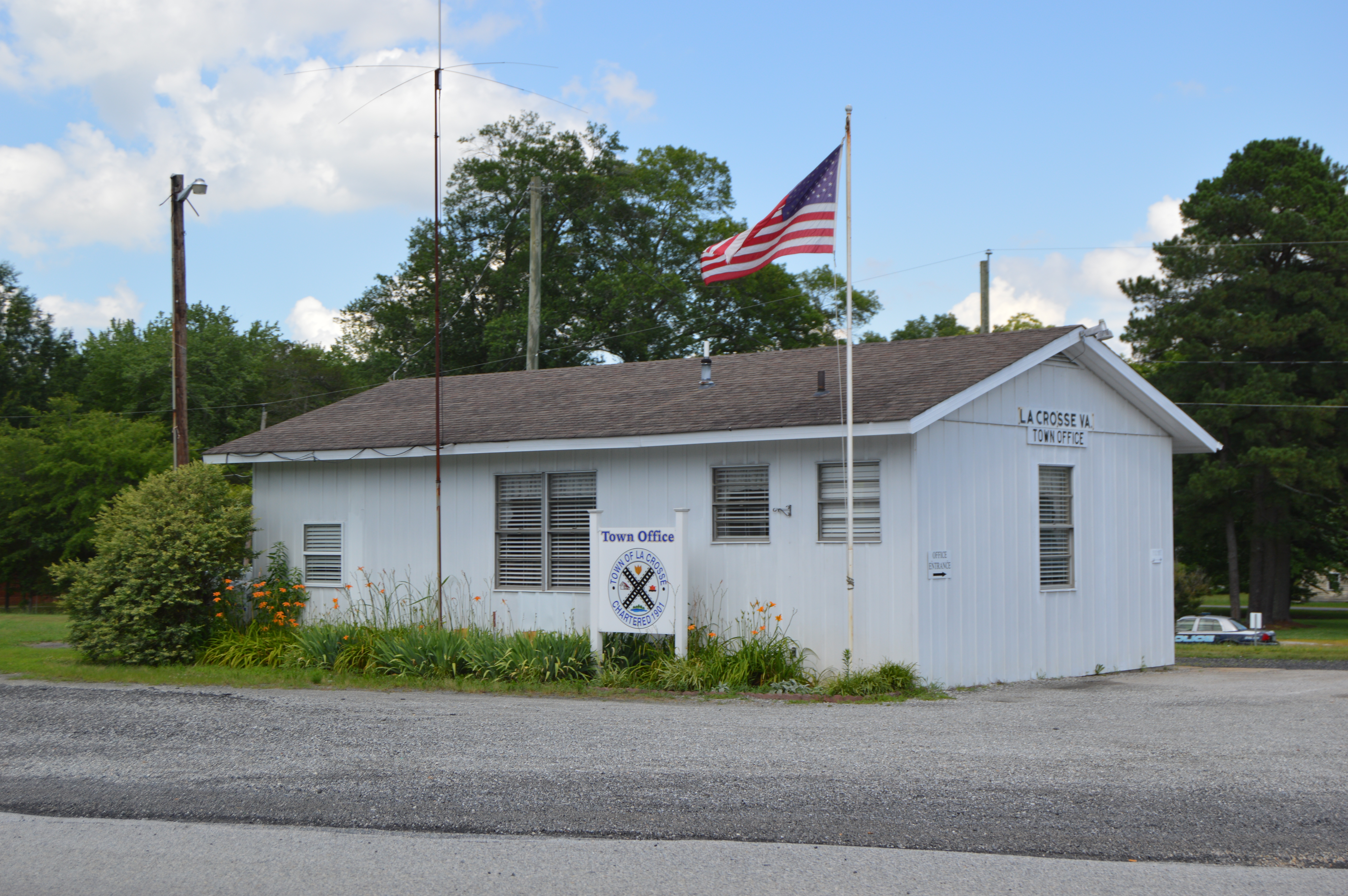
La Crosse town hall, Main near Seaboard

At the 2000 census there were 618 people, 263 households, and 160 families living in the town. The population density was 532.4 people per square mile (205.7/km^{2}). There were 314 housing units at an average density of 270.5 per square mile (104.5/km^{2}). The racial makeup of the town was 54.85% White, 43.20% African American, 0.32% Native American, 0.16% Asian, 0.49% from other races, and 0.97% from two or more races. Hispanic or Latino of any race were 2.91%.

Of the 263 households 27.4% had children under the age of 18 living with them, 35.7% were married couples living together, 21.7% had a female householder with no husband present, and 38.8% were non-families. 34.2% of households were one person and 18.3% were one person aged 65 or older. The average household size was 2.29 and the average family size was 2.90.

The age distribution was 22.3% under the age of 18, 9.2% from 18 to 24, 27.0% from 25 to 44, 23.5% from 45 to 64, and 18.0% 65 or older. The median age was 40 years. For every 100 females there were 79.7 males. For every 100 females aged 18 and over, there were 80.5 males.

The median household income was $24,643 and the median family income was $31,771. Males had a median income of $23,611 versus $17,813 for females. The per capita income for the town was $13,532. About 9.8% of families and 16.0% of the population were below the poverty line, including 24.1% of those under age 18 and 19.1% of those age 65 or over.
