= Record to report =

Finance and accounting management process

Record to report (R2R) is a Finance and Accounting (F&A) management process which involves collecting, processing and delivering relevant, timely and accurate information used for providing strategic, financial and operational feedback to understand how a business is performing. It also covers the steps involved in preparing and reporting the overall accounts which are typically stored in a general or nominal ledger and managed by a controller. The detailed steps involved are:

- data extraction
- data collection
- data validation
- data transformation (generation of voucher)
- voucher posting (to general ledger)
- storing vouchers in de-normalized and compressed format
- generating analysis account trial balance or consolidated analysis account trial balance
- generating user-defined financial and management reports

In general the Record to Report function is not engaged in processing transactions, but rather the aggregation of existing data in computer systems to enable meaningful performance reporting to be prepared for management. However, the R2R function may be a part of a broader accounting department.

In accounting terms an ideal IT platform (or ERP system) would be one which presents the data management need at the press of a button, however, various factors such as legacy systems, complexity, changing information needs and so on usually mean a team is needed on an ongoing basis to ensure the correct format reports are prepared.

What to expect in such a report:

- financial performance and position
- key performance indicators/metrics
- business commentary on the performance
- reconciliation of actual results to budget, forecast and prior year results

The other divisions of accounting in this structure are:

- invoice to payment (I2P), or P2P (Procure-to-pay)
- collect to cash (C2C), or O2C (Order to cash)
- manage fixed assets
- manage internal financial controls
