= Norlina Subdivision =

Railway line in North Carolina

The Norlina Subdivision is a railroad line owned by CSX Transportation in the U.S. State of North Carolina. The line currently runs from Norlina, North Carolina, to Raleigh, North Carolina, for a total of 51.2 miles. At its north end the line comes to an end and at its south end the line continues north from the Aberdeen Subdivision. While the current line dates back to 1840, it has been known as the Norlina Subdivision since 1967. Under CSX's predecessor, the Seaboard Coast Line Railroad, the Norlina Subdivision continued north to Collier Yard near Petersburg, Virginia.

== History ==
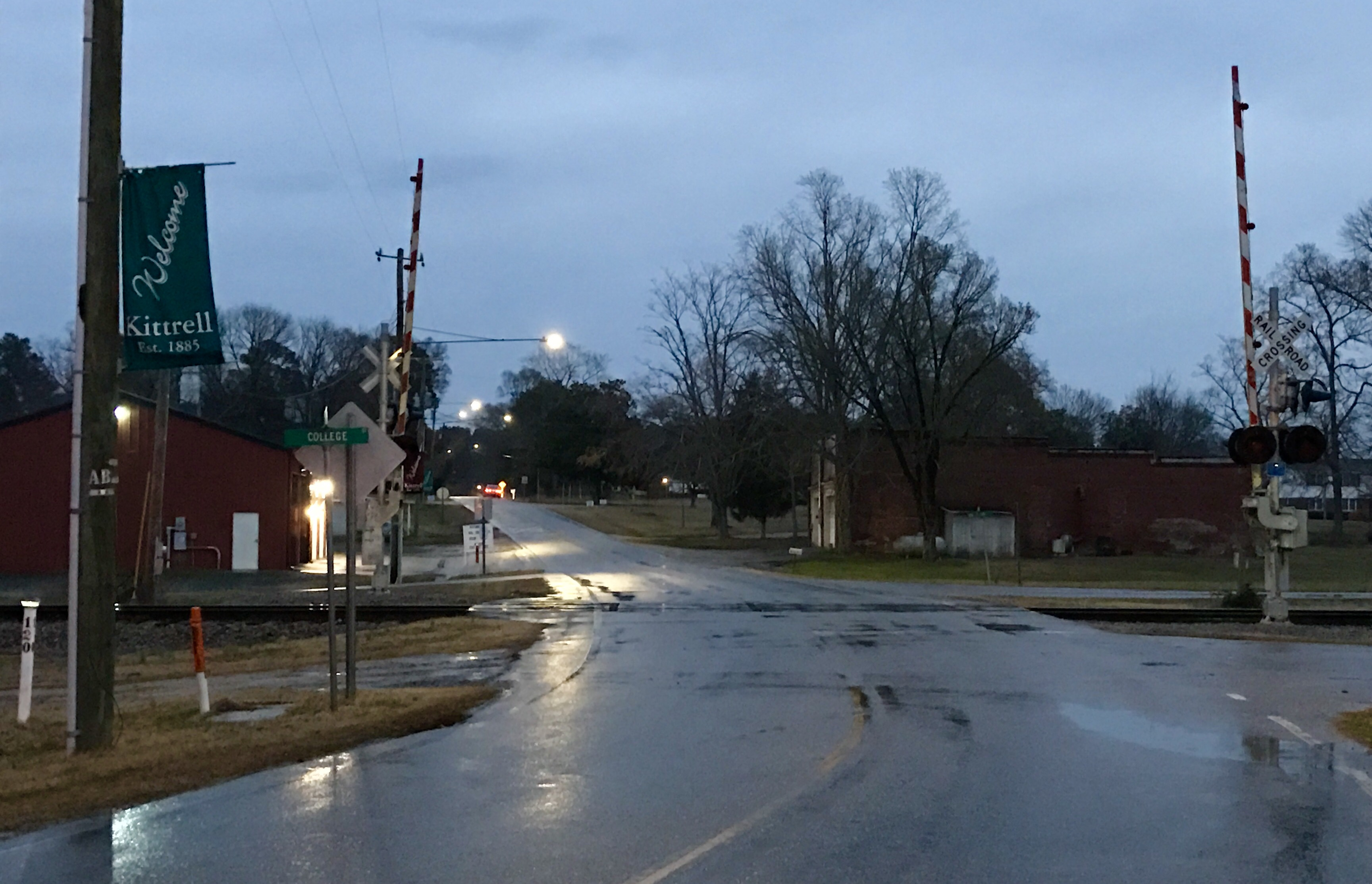
The Norlina Subdivision as it crosses Main Street in Kittrell, North Carolina.

The first segment of the Norlina Subdivision was built in 1840 by the Raleigh and Gaston Railroad, which in its entirety ran from Raleigh north to Norlina (known then as Ridgeway Junction) and east to Weldon. The Raleigh and Gaston Railroad became part of the Seaboard Air Line Railroad (SAL) in 1900. The same year, the SAL finished a line running from Norlina north to Richmond, Virginia (which was chartered by the Richmond, Petersburg and Carolina Railroad). Richmond would become the location of the SAL's corporate headquarters, and track from Richmond via Norlina to Raleigh would become part of SAL's main line. This segment of the main line from Richmond to Raleigh would be designated as the Richmond Subdivision. The original Raleigh and Gaston route from Norlina to Weldon became SAL's Portsmouth Subdivision.

In 1967, the SAL merged with its rival, the Atlantic Coast Line Railroad (ACL). The merged company was named the Seaboard Coast Line Railroad (SCL). After the merger, the ex-SAL main line became known as the "S Line" in the combined network. By 1975, the SCL abandoned the S Line north of Burgess and connected the remaining line to Collier Yard, which was located on the A Line (ex-ACL main line) just south of Petersburg, Virginia. The remaining line from Collier Yard to Raleigh was renamed the Norlina Subdivision.

In 1980, the Seaboard Coast Line's parent company merged with the Chessie System, creating the CSX Corporation. The CSX Corporation initially operated the Chessie and Seaboard Systems separately until 1986, when they were merged into CSX Transportation.

In 1987, CSX abandoned the line north of Norlina, leaving in place the track structure that is in place today. The last passenger train to use the through route from Petersburg was Amtrak's Silver Star on October 25, 1986. After the abandonment, the Silver Star between Petersburg and Raleigh was rerouted to CSX's North End Subdivision to Selma, North Carolina, where they would turn onto the Norfolk Southern-operated North Carolina Railroad.

The Norlina Subdivision today is only used by local freight trains.

== Future and state ownership ==
Despite the abandonment of the line north of Norlina, CSX continued to own the right of way of the abandoned segment. In late 2019, CSX agreed to sell the right of way to the states of Virginia and North Carolina. The states are considering rebuilding the line for high-speed passenger service as part of the Southeast High Speed Rail Corridor.

On March 30, 2021, Virginia Governor Ralph Northam and Transportation Secretary Pete Buttigieg announced that a $3.7 billion deal had been signed with CSX that finalized the sale of the Norlina Subdivision north of Ridgeway, in addition to the Buckingham Branch Railroad and half of the RF&P Subdivision right-of-way from Washington Union Station to Richmond Main Street Station, to the state of Virginia. Sale of the Norlina Subdivision south of Ridgeway to the North Carolina Department of Transportation is still pending as of April 2020.

== See also ==
- List of CSX Transportation lines
