= Norlina, North Carolina =

- Town
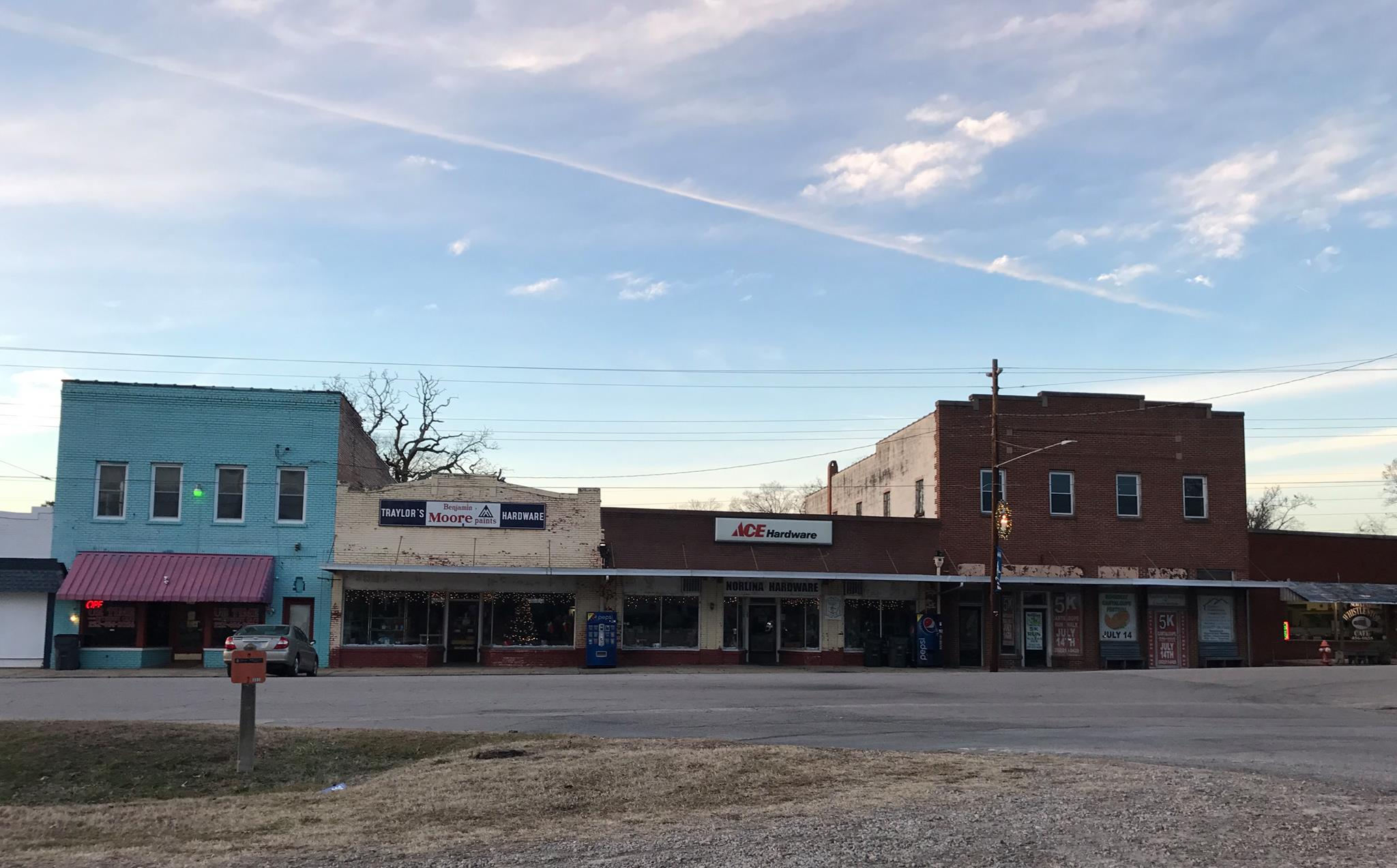
- Buildings along Hyco Street in downtown Norlina
- Motto: Norlina - where North Carolina begins and ends.
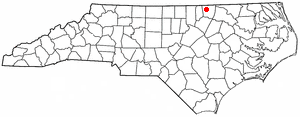
- Location of Norlina, North Carolina
- Coordinates: 36°26′43″N 78°11′43″W
- Country: United States
- State: North Carolina
- County: Warren

Area
  - Total: 1.12 sq mi (2.90 km^{2})
  - Land: 1.11 sq mi (2.88 km^{2})
  - Water: 0.0077 sq mi (0.02 km^{2})
- Elevation: 443 ft (135 m)

Population (2020)
  - Total: 920
  - Density: 826.9/sq mi (319.25/km^{2})
- Time zone: UTC-5 (Eastern (EST))
  - Summer (DST): UTC-4 (EDT)
- ZIP code: 27563
- Area code: 252
- FIPS code: 37-47240
- GNIS feature ID: 2406997
- Website: www.norlinanc.com

Norlina (/nɔːrˈlaɪnə/ nor-LY-nuh) is a town in Warren County, North Carolina, United States. As of the 2020 census, Norlina had a population of 920.

== Geography ==
According to the United States Census Bureau, the town has a total area of 1.12 square miles (2.9 km^{2}), all land.

== Demographics ==
Historical population
Census	Pop.	Note	%±
1920	673		—
1930	761		13.1%
1940	794		4.3%
1950	874		10.1%
1960	927		6.1%
1970	969		4.5%
1980	901		−7.0%
1990	996		10.5%
2000	1,107		11.1%
2010	1,118		1.0%
2020	920		−17.7%
2022 (est.)	928	▲	0.9%
U.S. Decennial Census

=== 2020 census ===
Norlina racial composition
Race	Number	Percentage
White (non-Hispanic)	362	39.35%
Black or African American (non-Hispanic)	472	51.3%
Native American	6	0.65%
Asian	2	0.22%
Pacific Islander	1	0.11%
Other/Mixed	37	4.02%
Hispanic or Latino	40	4.35%

As of the 2020 United States census, there were 920 people, 537 households, and 266 families residing in the town.

=== 2000 census ===
As of the census of 2000, there were 1,107 people, 482 households, and 300 families residing in the town. The population density was 986.0 inhabitants per square mile (380.7/km^{2}). There were 534 housing units at an average density of 475.6 per square mile (183.6/km^{2}). The racial makeup of the town was 57.36% White, 41.46% African American, 0.09% Native American, 0.72% from other races, and 0.36% from two or more races. Hispanic or Latino of any race were 1.36% of the population.

There were 482 households, out of which 28.0% had children under the age of 18 living with them, 38.2% were married couples living together, 21.2% had a female householder with no husband present, and 37.6% were non-families. 34.0% of all households were made up of individuals, and 18.3% had someone living alone who was 65 years of age or older. The average household size was 2.30 and the average family size was 2.96.

In the town, the population was spread out, with 24.4% under the age of 18, 9.4% from 18 to 24, 25.1% from 25 to 44, 21.7% from 45 to 64, and 19.4% who were 65 years of age or older. The median age was 39 years. For every 100 females, there were 83.0 males. For every 100 females age 18 and over, there were 77.0 males.

The median income for a household in the town was $25,300, and the median income for a family was $28,125. Males had a median income of $23,182 versus $21,354 for females. The per capita income for the town was $12,355. About 12.9% of families and 18.8% of the population were below the poverty line, including 27.9% of those under age 18 and 23.4% of those age 65 or over.

== History ==
Norlina was first called the "Ridgeway Junction" in 1837. As a railroad passed through this area, many citizens started to sell wood and water to the railroad. Eventually this began to expand, and in the 1860s the name changed to the "Woodyard". By the 1870s, the area had grown in business, and was referred to as the "Junction". The Seaboard & Raleigh Railroad had just been formed, and the "Junction" was now thriving with its business. A small community was formed, including two hardware stores, a horse drawn taxi service, and smithing shops. By 1900, John Williams established the Seaboard Air Line Railway and it grew to over 4,680 miles. This small group of people had turned the railway stop into a real town. In 1913, the name Norlina was coined, being a portmanteau of the beginning of "North" and the ending of "Carolina".

== See also ==
- Soul City, North Carolina
