= National Register of Historic Places listings in Pittsylvania County, Virginia =

Location of Pittsylvania County in Virginia

This is a list of the National Register of Historic Places listings in Pittsylvania County, Virginia.

This is intended to be a complete list of the properties and districts on the National Register of Historic Places in Pittsylvania County, Virginia, United States. The locations of National Register properties and districts for which the latitude and longitude coordinates are included below, may be seen in an online map.

There are 24 properties and districts listed on the National Register in the county, including 1 National Historic Landmark. Another 2 properties were once listed but have been removed.

This National Park Service list is complete through NPS recent listings posted March 6, 2026.

== Current listings ==
	Name on the Register	Image	Date listed	Location	City or town	Description
1	Berry Hill	Berry Hill	May 6, 1980 (#80004210)	Southwest of Berry Hill; 36°32′43″N 79°37′12″W	Berry Hill	
2	Bill's Diner	Bill's Diner	December 16, 1996 (#96001450)	1 Depot St. 36°49′30″N 79°23′54″W	Chatham	
3	Burnett's Diner	Burnett's Diner	December 16, 1996 (#96001451)	19 S. Main St. 36°49′32″N 79°23′53″W	Chatham	
4	Chatham Historic District	Chatham Historic District	July 13, 2001 (#01000698)	Main, Payne, Pruden, Reid, and Whittle Sts., Lanier Ave., Court Place, and Gilmer Dr. 36°49′33″N 79°23′54″W	Chatham	
5	Chatham Southern Railway Depot	Chatham Southern Railway Depot	August 24, 2015 (#15000550)	340 Whitehead St. 36°49′15″N 79°24′09″W	Chatham	
6	Clerk's Office	Clerk's Office	July 8, 1982 (#82004580)	Main St. 36°49′34″N 79°24′00″W	Chatham	
7	Phillip Craft House	Phillip Craft House	February 16, 2001 (#01000144)	1381 Old Red Eye Rd. 36°54′13″N 79°27′35″W	Chatham	Destroyed by fire on April 18, 2017
8	Thomas Claiborne Creasy House	Thomas Claiborne Creasy House	February 17, 2015 (#15000018)	415 S. Main St. 36°56′54″N 79°21′40″W	Gretna	
9	Gilbert's Restaurant		May 8, 2025 (#100011808)	401-405 N. Main Street; 36°50′09″N 79°23′37″W	Chatham	
10	Gosney Store		August 29, 2022 (#100008083)	North corner of jct. of VA 360E (Old Richmond Rd.) and VA 726N (Malmaison Rd.); 36°40′47″N 79°19′13″W	Blairs vicinity	
11	Gretna Commercial Historic District	Gretna Commercial Historic District	May 28, 2013 (#13000342)	N. and S. Main St., and Henry St. 36°57′07″N 79°21′40″W	Gretna	26 contributing buildings.
12	Hargrave Military Academy	Hargrave Military Academy	January 24, 2020 (#100004652)	200 Military Dr. 36°49′56″N 79°24′00″W	Chatham	
13	Hill Grove School	Hill Grove School	February 25, 2004 (#04000104)	2580 Wards Rd. 37°04′04″N 79°14′57″W	Hurt	
14	Leesville Dam Archeological Site (44PY30)		November 2, 1989 (#89001916)	Address Restricted	Altavista	
15	Little Cherrystone	Little Cherrystone	November 12, 1969 (#69000269)	North of the junction of State Route 57 and Fairview Rd. 36°49′11″N 79°20′58″W	Chatham	
16	Locust Hill	Locust Hill	November 27, 2002 (#02001449)	7408 Wards Rd. 37°06′47″N 79°14′41″W	Hurt	
17	Mountain View	Mountain View	September 10, 1979 (#79003066)	2 miles south of Chatham on Tight Squeeze Rd. 36°46′56″N 79°24′13″W	Chatham	
18	Oak Hill		August 22, 2024 (#100010693)	Address Restricted	Danville vicinity	
19	Oak Ridge	Oak Ridge	August 28, 2017 (#100001515)	2345 U.S. Route 311; 36°34′52″N 79°32′43″W	Danville	
20	Pittsylvania County Courthouse	Pittsylvania County Courthouse	October 29, 1981 (#81000643)	U.S. Route 29 Business; 36°49′35″N 79°23′54″W	Chatham	
21	Southside High School		August 7, 2020 (#100005430)	200 Blairs Middle School Cir. 36°41′20″N 79°22′16″W	Blairs	Now the middle school?
22	Windsor	Windsor	July 30, 1980 (#80004211)	Mountain Run Rd. 36°32′49″N 79°38′25″W	Cascade	
23	Yates Tavern	Yates Tavern	December 19, 1974 (#74002143)	South of Gretna on U.S. Route 29 Business; 36°56′08″N 79°22′01″W	Gretna	
24	John and Nancy Yeatts House	John and Nancy Yeatts House	March 25, 2009 (#09000173)	Emery Rd. 36°53′39″N 79°25′40″W	Chatham	

== Former listings ==
	Name on the Register	Image	Date listed	Date removed	Location	City or town	Description
1	Oak Hill	Oak Hill	December 28, 1979 (#79003068)	March 19, 2001	VA 863	Oak Ridge	Destroyed by fire in 1988
2	Woodlawn	Woodlawn	May 26, 2005 (#05000478)	February 21, 2017	5321 Henrys Mill Rd. 36°46′31″N 79°09′48″W	Vernon Hill	Demolished in 2015.

== See also ==
- List of National Historic Landmarks in Virginia
- National Register of Historic Places listings in Virginia
