= Chatham Historic District =

Historic district in Virginia, United States

- U.S. National Register of Historic Places
- U.S. Historic district
- Virginia Landmarks Register
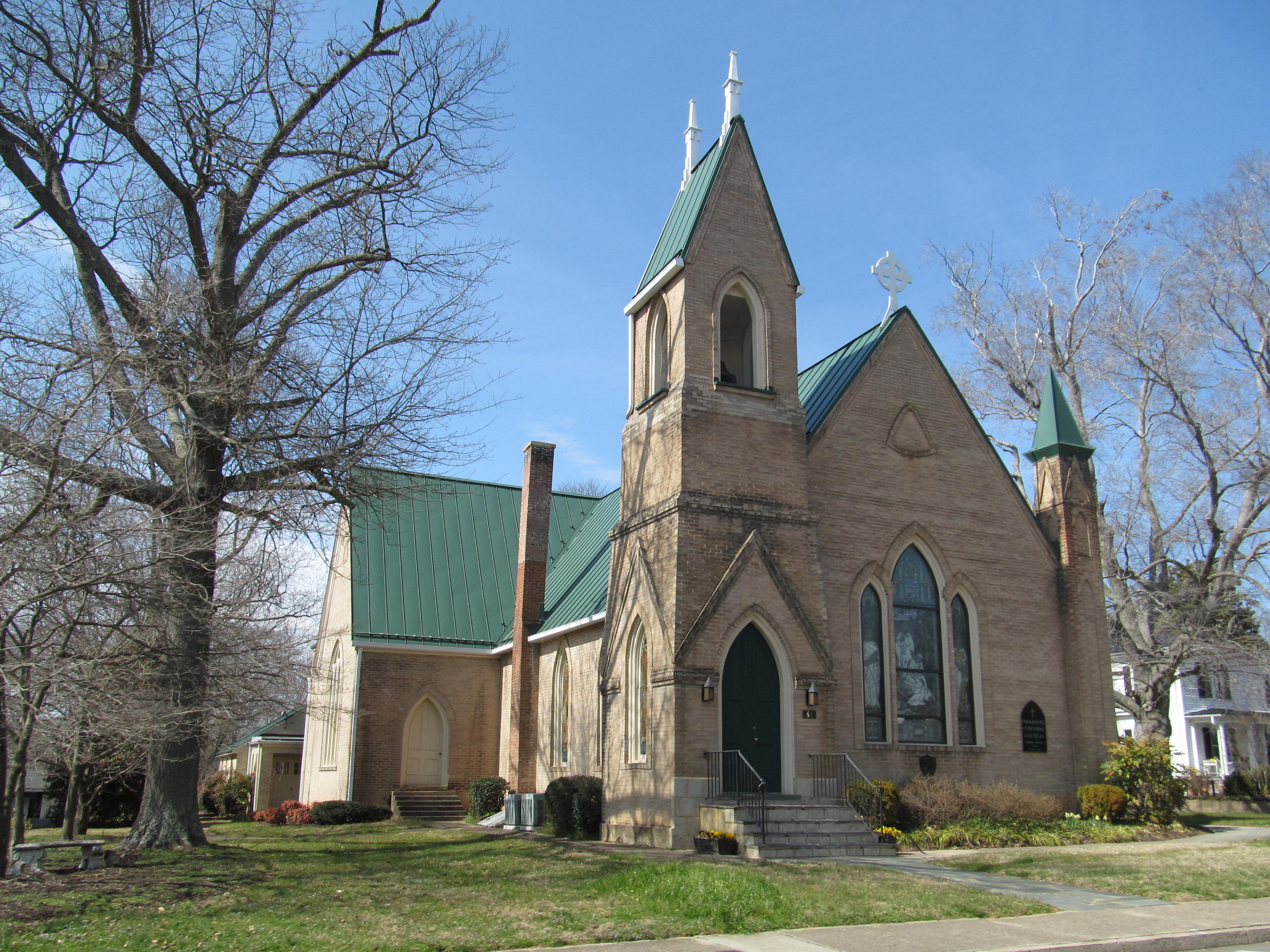
- Emmanuel Episcopal Church

- Location within Virginia Location within the United States
- Location: Main, Payne, Pruden, Reid, Whittle Sts.; Lanier Ave., Court Place; Gilmer Dr., Chatham, Virginia
- Coordinates: 36°49′28″N 79°23′50″W
- Area: 95 acres (38 ha)
- Built: 1807
- Architectural style: Federal, Queen Anne, et al.
- NRHP reference No.: 01000698
- VLR No.: 187-5001

Significant dates
- Added to NRHP: July 13, 2001
- Designated VLR: March 14, 2001

Chatham Historic District is a national historic district located at Chatham, Pittsylvania County, Virginia. The district includes 188 contributing buildings, 2 contributing sites, and 1 contributing object in the central business district of the town of Chatham. The district includes a variety of government, commercial, residential, religious and educational buildings and structures dating from the early-19th century to the mid-20th century. At the center of the district is the separately listed Pittsylvania County Courthouse. Other notable buildings include the Judge Tredway House, Tunstall-Hargrave House, The Oaks (1832), Morea (1837), Hugh Weir House (1835), Planter's Bank, Thompson's Drug and Haberdashy Building, Corinth Christian Church, Emmanuel Episcopal Church (1881), Chatham Presbyterian Church (1886), Canada-Melton House (c. 1875), United States Post Office, Chatham High School, Chatham Elementary School (1925), Chatham Savings Bank, Masonic Temple (c. 1900), Collie Hotel/William Pitt Hotel (c. 1925), Beauty Plaza (c. 1950), and the Moses Building. Also located in the district and separately listed are the Clerk's Office, Bill's Diner, and Burnett's Diner.

It was listed on the National Register of Historic Places in 2001.
