= Fountain Valley School of Colorado =

Private, boarding and day school in Colorado Springs, Colorado

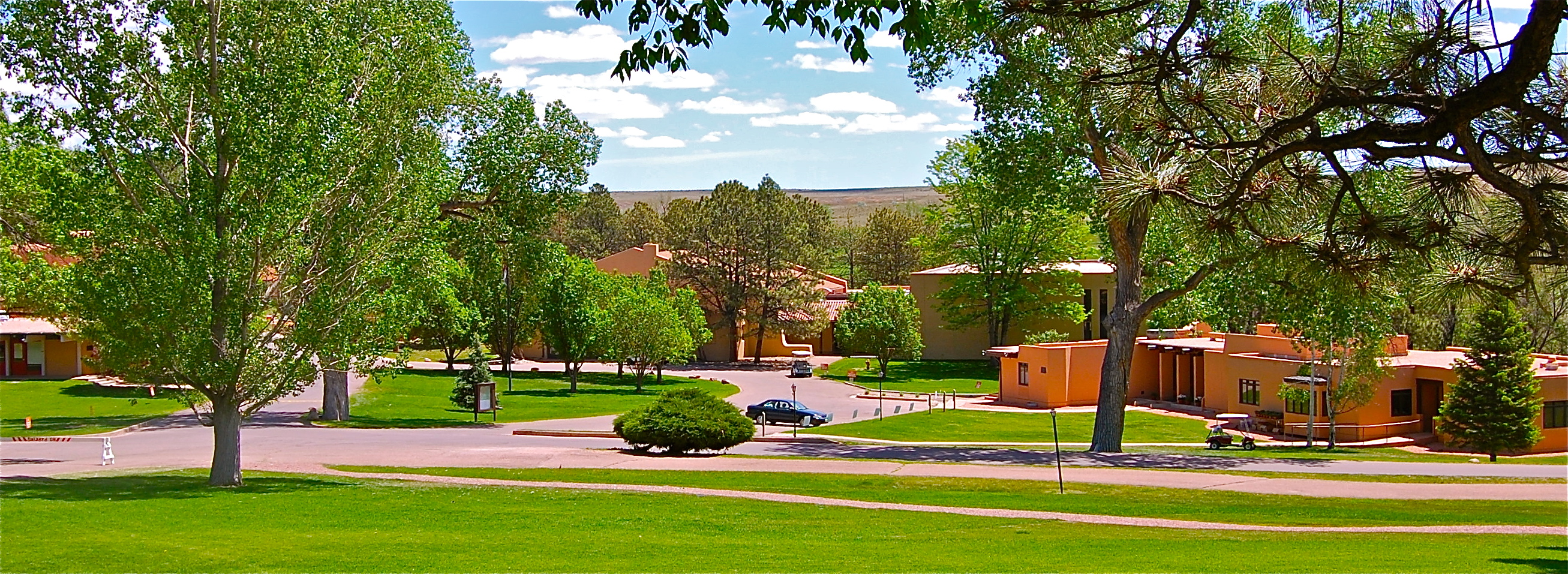

Location
- 6155 Fountain Valley School Rd; Colorado Springs, Colorado; United States; 38°44′43″N 104°42′30″W

Information
- Type: Private, boarding and day school
- Religious affiliation: None
- Established: 1930
- CEEB code: 060275
- NCES School ID: 00209217
- Head of school: Megan Harlan
- Grades: 9-12
- Gender: Co-educational
- Enrollment: 220 students
- International students: 30%
- Classes: Over 100
- Average class size: 12 students
- Student to teacher ratio: 6:1
- Campuses: Main Campus; Mountain Campus
- Campus size: 1,100 acres
- Colors: Red, gray, white
- Athletics conference: CHSAA; Black Forest League
- Sports: Climbing, Cross Country, English & Western Riding, Boys Lacrosse, Mountain Biking, Basketball, Soccer, Swimming & Diving, Tennis, Volleyball
- Mascot: Dane
- Accreditation: Association of Colorado Independent Schools (ACIS), the National Association of Independent Schools (NAIS), and The Association of Boarding Schools (TABS)
- Tuition: $40,700 - $75,900
- Website: www.fvs.edu

The Fountain Valley School of Colorado (commonly known as FVS) is a private, co-educational college-preparatory boarding and day school in Colorado Springs, Colorado. Founded in 1930, the school’s primary campus is located on 1,100-acres of rolling prairie at the base of the Rocky Mountains. The School also has a 40-acre Mountain Campus near Buena Vista, Colo., that provides opportunities for experiential education programs and class retreats. FVS enrolls approximately 220 students in 9th through 12th grade, representing more than 20 states and 23 countries.

The school is approximately 70% boarding students and 30% international students. Originally a ranch, FVS was founded in 1930 by Elizabeth Sage Hare, a civic leader, art patron, and visionary educator who sought to balance traditional academic excellence with progressive ideals and the character-building landscape of the American West. The school opened as a boys’ boarding school in September 1930 and later became co-educational in 1975. Fountain Valley is accredited by the Association of Colorado Independent Schools, the National Association of Independent Schools, and The Association of Boarding Schools.

== History and Overview ==
=== Origins ===
In 1929, Elizabeth Sage Hare gathered a group of friends to help establish what would become Fountain Valley School.

Together, they envisioned a boarding school that combined traditional academic excellence with progressive ideals of individual dignity and creative promise, cultivating both intellect and character amid the wide-open landscape of the American West. With the support of Colorado Springs entrepreneur and philanthropist Spencer Penrose, Hare persuaded educator Francis Mitchell Froelicher to become the School’s first headmaster and invited renowned architect John Gaw Meem to design the campus in the distinctive Pueblo Revival style. The site chosen for the school was the Lazy B Ranch, owned by Jack Bradley.

Its centerpiece, a 1927 estate designed by famed architect Addison Mizner, became the School’s first building. The house, known as Casa Serena and commonly referred to as the Hacienda, was surrounded by stables, a polo field, and several ranch residences. In November 1929, Hare purchased the ranch and its facilities for $150,000, and by September 1930, the school officially opened as a boys’ boarding school with 57 students. The founding faculty included F. Martin Brown (science), Alexander S. Campbell (English), Roswell C. Josephs and Robert C. Langdon (mathematics), Ernest Kitson (music), C. Dwight Perry (French), and artist Boardman Robinson (art). Froelicher, a nationally recognized progressive educator, was the leader behind incorporating the environment into Fountain Valley's programs. By 1969, FVS had students from 32 states and nine countries. This same year, Headmaster Lewis W. Perry Jr. (1958-1978) urged the Board of Trustees to approve the formation of a faculty committee to study co-educational schools. By 1976, the School enrolled 77 girls and three new female teachers, making Fountain Valley a co-educational school.

=== Heads of School ===
Francis M. Froelicher (1930–50)

Henry B. Poor (1951–58)

Lewis W. Perry Jr. (1958–78)

Timothy Knox (1978–87)

Eric S. Waples (1987–95)

John E. Creeden (1995-2007)

Craig W. Larimer (2007–13)

William V. Webb (2013–22)

Megan K. Harlan (2022–2026)

== Academics ==
=== Education ===
Fountain Valley School offers a college-preparatory curriculum, and has an average class size of 12 students and a student to faculty ratio of 6:1. Students complete acore sequence of courses across the humanities, sciences, mathematics, world languages, and the arts.

Graduation requirements total 20 academic credits, ensuring that every student experiences a balanced and comprehensive education that builds analytical skills, cultural understanding, and creative expression.

=== Signature Academic Experiences ===
==== 9th Grade: Western Immersion ====
Every Fountain Valley education begins with a connection to place. The Western Immersion Program anchors the ninth-grade year, immersing students in the ecology, history, and culture of the American West. Combining literature, environmental science, art, and local history, students explore both the prairie on the main campus and the Class of 1969 Mountain Campus near Buena Vista. In this week-long, hands-on experience, students study Colorado’s ecosystems and mining history, sketch landscapes, write field journals, and learn to see the land as a teacher.

As one faculty member described, Western Immersion “invites students to fall in love with where they learn”—reflecting FVS’s founding principle that education should be both rooted in place and expansive in perspective.

==== 10th Grade: Global Societies ====
As students progress to their sophomore year, they develop a global mindset that challenges and enriches their worldview, and spurs them to ask deep questions and analyze their place in the world.

Through Fountain Valley’s Interim Program, all tenth grade students will travel abroad for a learning expedition.

==== 11th Grade: Learning to Lead ====
11th grade students explore the themes of influence, action, and leadership, reflecting on their impact within the Fountain Valley community and beyond. Through immersive experiences, students engage with others and contribute to the common good. Students are tasked with planning and leading their own retreat at the Mountain Campus and prepare for leadership roles.

==== The Senior Year: Capstone and Global Scholar Diploma ====
In their final year, students undertake a Capstone Project, an independent research or creative endeavor that demonstrates intellectual depth and personal growth. Working with faculty mentors, seniors design and complete original projects ranging from scientific experiments and art installations to policy analysis and film production.

Students may also pursue distinction through the Global Scholar or STEM Diploma, interdisciplinary pathways that integrate advanced coursework, independent research, and global or technical inquiry. These programs challenge students to investigate complex questions, build cross-cultural understanding, and contribute meaningfully to contemporary conversations.

=== College Counseling ===
The college counseling program is grounded in the belief that students thrive when they find the college that truly fits them academically, socially, and personally. Rather than focusing on rankings alone, FVS emphasizes thoughtful, student-driven exploration. Students are empowered to lead their own college searches, supported by parents and experienced counselors, while personalized guidance ensures each student receives individual attention tailored to their goals, strengths, and aspirations. This approach has delivered meaningful results for Fountain Valley.

Over the past five years, 100% of FVS graduates have matriculated to post-secondary institutions, earning 419 acceptances to 159 distinct colleges and universities. The breadth of outcomes reflects the program’s commitment to helping every student find a path that sets them up for success in college and beyond.

== Interim Program ==
The Interim program at Fountain Valley School is a long-standing experiential learning initiative held annually in the spring. During this period, the traditional academic schedule is suspended and replaced with immersive, off-campus experiences designed to extend classroom learning through hands-on engagement. Interim has been part of the school’s curriculum for more than 50 years and is required for all students. Interim Expeditions vary by grade level and focus. Ninth-grade students remain in Colorado, participating in regional, place-based programs that emphasize community building and environmental awareness. Sophomores all take part in international travel experiences that connect their language requirement with global experiences.

Juniors and seniors choose from a range of domestic and international expeditions. Program offerings commonly include cultural immersion, environmental and scientific fieldwork, service learning, language study, and outdoor education. The program is intended to foster independence, adaptability, and global awareness while strengthening relationships among students and faculty. Interim experiences are faculty-led and typically last between seven and fourteen days, reflecting the school’s broader emphasis on experiential education beyond the traditional classroom.

== Campus, Setting, and Architecture ==
=== Location ===
Set at an elevation of roughly 6,000 feet on the edge of the Great Plains, Fountain Valley School’s 1,100-acre campus opens toward sweeping views of Pikes Peak and the Sangre de Cristo Mountains. The school is located 3 miles from the Colorado Springs Airport and 92 miles from Denver International Airport. The high-prairie landscape has defined the School’s identity since its founding in 1930. The setting offers a living classroom for exploration, reflection, and outdoor learning, where students study ecology, ride horses, and compete on athletic fields all within sight of the Rockies.

=== Architecture ===
The main campus blends historic ranch architecture with contemporary learning environments. Its earliest structure, the original ranch house Casa Serena, is a stuccoed Spanish Colonial Revival home wrapped around a courtyard and built by architect Addison Mizner in 1927. Many of the campus buildings set a tone of western authenticity and reflect the Pueblo Revival designs of architect John Gaw Meem. These adobe-inspired forms, arched doorways, thick stucco walls, and red-tile roofs, continue to inform the School’s architectural character today.

Over time, FVS has expanded to include modern residential halls and academic facilities that honor the simplicity and materiality of the early ranch buildings while meeting the needs of twenty-first-century learners. Recent renovations and additions, such as the Julie and Spencer Penrose Athletic Center and the Makerspace, integrate sustainability and craft into the architectural vocabulary of the prairie.

==== Signature Spaces ====
At the creative heart of campus stands the Art Barn, a cornerstone of school life since the 1940s. This three-story studio complex houses studios for painting, ceramics, metalsmithing, darkroom photography, digital media, and film production. Student exhibitions fill its gallery spaces, celebrating the fusion of craftsmanship and imagination.

The campus also supports a working equestrian program, featuring barns with 28 stalls with runs, automatic waterers, and rubber-matted flooring; a 150’ × 275’ indoor riding arena; four competition-sized outdoor arenas; a covered arena; and surrounding pastures that reflect the School’s enduring connection to the land. Adjacent fields and more than 15 miles of trails provide additional venues for athletics, cross-country running, mountain biking, and other outdoor activities.

Residential life is centered around ten dormitories, each housing between 16 and 20 students, fostering close-knit communities that reflect the School’s emphasis on belonging and shared experience. The Julie and Spencer Penrose Athletic Center, a 60,000-square-foot facility, features the largest indoor high school climbing wall in the country, along with a 25-meter swimming pool, strength and conditioning center, indoor spin room, indoor track, gymnasium, and training spaces that support more than a dozen interscholastic sports.

=== Mountain Campus ===
Complementing the main campus is the Class of 1969 Mountain Campus, a 40-acre site near Buena Vista, Colorado. Nestled in the Upper Arkansas Valley, the property hosts class retreats, experiential education programs, and leadership expeditions. From rock climbing and field research to reflection circles by the fire, students can experience the same spirit of curiosity and independence that defined Fountain Valley’s founders.

== Athletics ==
Fountain Valley competes in the Colorado High School Activities Association (CHSAA) and the Black Forest League (BFL) and offers both traditional and “mountain sports”. Traditional sports include boys and girls soccer, boys and girls tennis, boys and girls volleyball, boys and girls basketball, boys and girls swimming and diving, co-ed english and western riding, co-ed mountain biking, co-ed rock climbing, co-ed cross country, and boys lacrosse.

FVS teams also consistently qualify for postseason play. In the 2024-25 season, 12 out of 16 FVS competition teams advanced to post-season play.

== Equestrian Programs ==
=== English Riding ===
Founded at FVS in 2003, the English Riding program is built around the American forward seat riding system as supported by the United States Hunter Jumper Association (USHJA). Riders can take part with their personal horses or ride one of the School’s horses. Fountain Valley offers three class groups with qualified instructors, all accomplished riders and many certified by the USHJA, to support riders of all levels. Riders also have access to on- and off-campus clinics led by equestrian coaches such as Bernie Traurig, Joanne Warring, Julie Winkel, and Nick Karazissis. Riders have also attended programs like the Emerging Athletes Program (EAP). In addition to participating in local and A-rated shows, the School’s English Riding program sponsors an IEA (Interscholastic Equestrian Association) team, which has won at zones, regionals, and nationals during multiple seasons.

Many Fountain Valley alumni, such as Michaela Edwards ’19 of Stanford University, have gone on to ride in NCAA and IHSA collegiate programs, and have also become professional riders, trainers, and veterinarians in the equine industry.

=== Western Riding ===
Riding, the oldest athletic program offered at FVS, began with the School’s inception in 1930. As a working cattle ranch focused on ranch horses and teaching students to work with animals, the Western Riding program played a vital role in helping FVS’s first students complete their daily chores.

Today, the School’s Western Riding program teaches riders horse management, and prepares riders for competition in the IEA (Interscholastic Equestrian Association) with a focus on Horsemanship and Ranch Riding. Students regularly take to the trails of Fountain Valley’s 1,100-acre Prairie and have opportunities to participate in overnight pack trips in the mountains near Buena Vista and in PicketWire Canyon twice per year.

In the Western Riding Program, students gain a better understanding of horsemanship by taking care of their assigned horses and learning grooming, tacking, and the safe handling of a horse. In the saddle, they not only work on skills in Horsemanship but also in Ranch Riding, and – for more advanced riders – Reining. The spring season offers a chance for students to go back to the roots of FVS and practice working cattle, sorting, and penning.

== Student Life ==
With a 70% boarding population, life at FVS blends academic challenge with community spirit. All students, boarders and day students alike, participate in weekly community meetings, weekend activities, and campus traditions. Each year there are two student music festivals: Danesapalooza and Danechella, 20 weekend ski & ride trips, five school dances: Silly Night Out, Barn Dance, Monster Mash, Winter Formal, and Prom, dorm-based house cup competitions, weekend buses to local Colorado activities and shopping, and over 23 student-led clubs. The school mascot, the Dane, honors the Great Dane that belonged to the founding family of Fountain Valley School.

== Notable alumni ==
- Bob Weir, a member of the Grateful Dead
- John Perry Barlow, digital rights activist, founder of the Electronic Frontier Foundation, and lyricist for The Grateful Dead
- Ian Munsick, a country music star who led the resurgence of country western in Nashville
- Marshall Bell, actor (Total Recall and Outer Banks)
- Brad Dourif (HBO's Deadwood and The Lord of the Rings movie trilogy)
- Dominique Dunne, actress (Poltergeist)
- Griffin Dunne
- Lang Fisher, co-creator of Never Have I Ever
- Samuel Goldwyn Jr.
- David Hare, artist, son of founder Elizabeth Sage Hare
- Matthew Huxley, son of British author Aldous Huxley
- John R. Lane, director of the Dallas Museum of Art
- Steve Lemme, of Broken Lizard Comedy Troop (starring in movies such as Super Troopers, Club Dread, and Beerfest)
- Paul Matisse, grandson to Henri Matisse
- Belding Scribner, pioneer of kidney dialysis
- Ed Sherin, producer of Law & Order
- Peter Throckmorton, author and marine archaeologist; enrolled as Edgerton Alvord Throckmorton.
- David Philipps, two-time Pulitzer Prize winning journalist for the New York Times
