= Sharswood =

Sharswood may refer to:

- Sharswood Plantation, a plantation in Gretna, Virginia
- Sharswood, Philadelphia, U.S., neighborhood
- George Sharswood School, K–8 school in Philadelphia
- George Sharswood (1810–1883), American jurist
