= Cherrystone =

Cherrystone may refer to:

== Places ==
- Cherrystone, Virginia, United States, an unincorporated community
  - Cherrystone Bar Light, a former lighthouse
- Little Cherrystone, a historic home in Chatham, Virginia, United States
- Cherrystone Kingdom, a fictional nation in 2019 turn-based tactics video game Wargroove

== Other uses ==
- Cherrystone, a size classification of hard clam
- Commander Cherrystone, an antagonist in 1995 American novel Wicked (Maguire novel)
