= Yancy Cabin =

Yancy cabin may refer to:

- Yates Tavern, a historic tavern located near Gretna, Pittsylvania County, Virginia
- Yancy cabin in Gretna, Virginia, part of the Historic American Buildings Survey
