= Chatham Hall =

Private boarding school in Virginia, US

Coordinates: 36°49′32″N 79°23′21″W

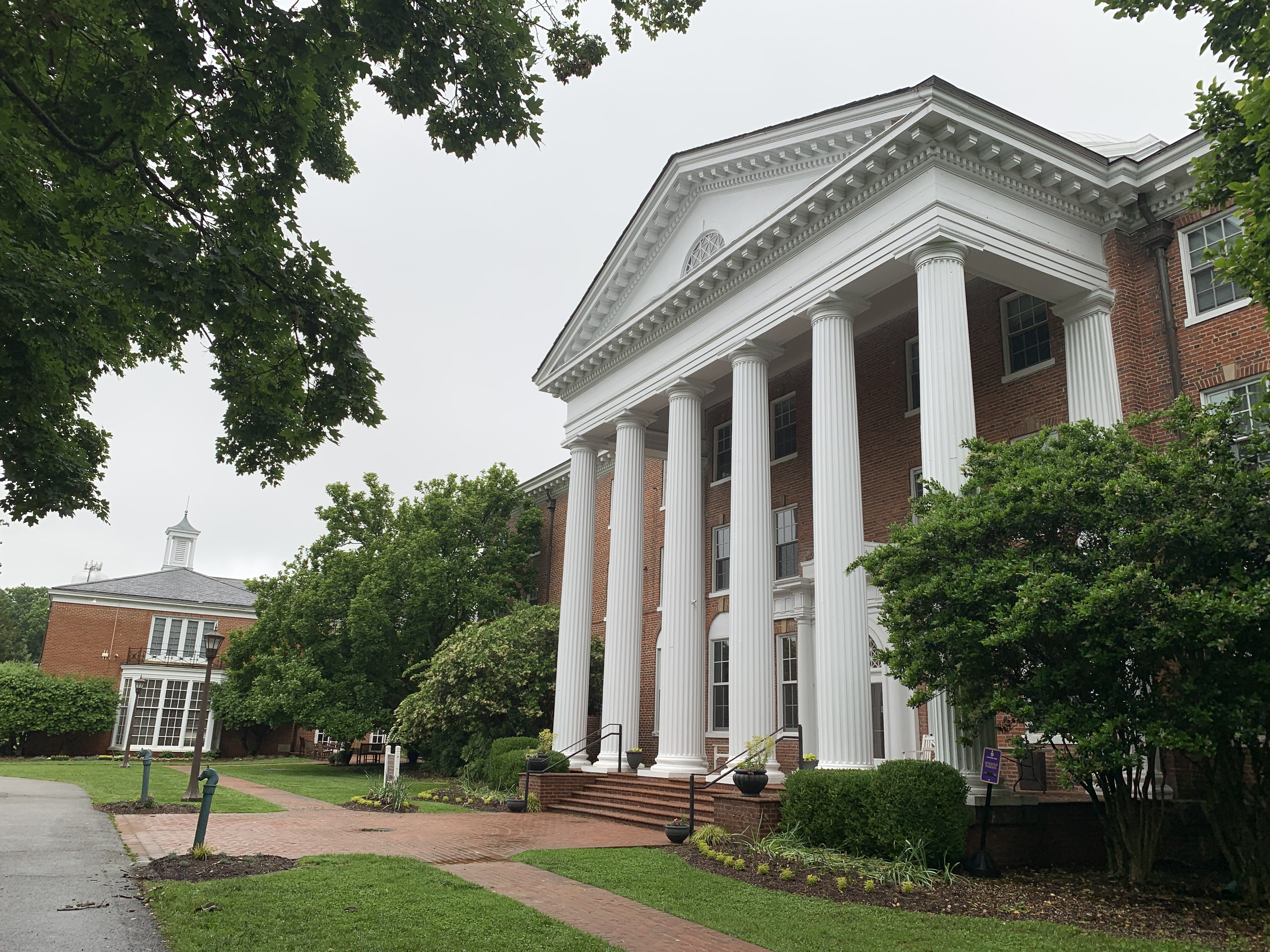
- Pruden Hall, the administrative building for Chatham Hall
- Chatham, Virginia; United States

Information
- Former name: Chatham Episcopal Institute.
- Type: Private, boarding
- Motto: Esto Perpetua (Let it be perpetual)
- Religious affiliation: Episcopal
- Established: 1894
- Acting Head of School: Jennifer Hiltwine (2026)
- Faculty: 29 academic 67% with advanced degrees
- Enrollment: 111
- Average class size: 8 students
- Student to teacher ratio: 5:1
- Campus: 365 acres (1.48 km^{2})
- Colors: Purple and Gold
- Athletics: 13 interscholastic sports
- Mascot: Turtle
- Website: www.chathamhall.org

Chatham Hall is an independent grade 9-12 girls' Episcopal boarding school in Chatham, Virginia, United States, founded in 1894 as Chatham Episcopal Institute by the rector and parishioners of Emmanuel Episcopal Church.

Chatham Hall is accredited by the Virginia Association of Independent Schools, a member of the National Association for College Admission Counseling (NACAC), and is in compliance with the NACAC's Principle of Good Practice.

== Academics ==
Chatham Hall’s average class size is seven with a 5:1 student:teacher ratio, with a diverse student body, including a large proportion of international students.

Curricular highlights include advanced courses, student-led & faculty guided independent studies, global entrepreneurship, student-led workshops, robotics, as well as robust science, literature, mathmatics, history, language, and arts programs. The majority of teaching faculty hold an advanced degree, and all faculty members are highly-qualified in their subject area.

The school hosts a "Leader in Residence" each year, providing students the opportunity to learn from and closely alongside highly successful women. Additionally, the school hosts writers and musicians in residence to further connect classroom learning to authentic work being done.

== Campus life ==
In 2025-2026, 95% of Chatham Hall students live on campus. Boarding students live on-campus for five or seven days a week. There are a small number of day students as well. Tuition for the 2026-2027 school year is $30,500 (day students), $63,00 (5-day boarding), and $73,000 (7-day boarding). More than half of the student body receives financial aid.

In the afternoons, students participate in activities that include a competitive athletics program in the Blue Ridge Conference, Interscholastic Equestrian Association (IEA) team and campus riding program, performing arts, and more. Sports currently offered include basketball, cross-country, field hockey, lacrosse, golf, riding, soccer, swimming, tennis, and volleyball.

Chatham Hall is well-known for its riding program and facilities, including the Mars Riding Arena and Hunter Trial Field. The campus is home to 30 horses, two additional teaching arenas, and riding trails.

Chatham Hall is an independent Episcopal school with chapel services twice a week and follows the precepts of the National Association of Episcopal Schools (NAES).

Chatham Hall maintains many traditions, including a robust honor code and many longstanding yearly events .

== Campus ==
The Chatham Hall campus is 365 acres in Chatham, Virginia, United States located at 800 Chatham Hall Circle. The school maintains an official arboretum where students and guests may learn about native and planted species. The school employs a horticulturalist full-time to maintain extensive gardens, including Curtis' Garden, a central campus location intended to be enjoyed during all seasons.

Chatham Hall has notable Greek Revival architecture including Pruden Hall with its six massive Doric columns, portico with dentil moldings, and domed rotunda over the "Well." Additional notable buildings include Dabney Hall, Mars Riding Arena, the romanesque St. Mary’s Chapel, and the Wagoner-La Duke Center for Athletics, Health, and Wellness, a 30,000 sq. ft. complex completed in 2024 to provide a state-of-the-art facility to support student athletics & wellness.

== Notable alumnae ==
- Claudia Emerson (1975) – Pulitzer-Prize-winning poet
- Georgia O'Keeffe (1905) – artist
- Margaret Sullavan (1927) – Film star and Oscar nominee
- Ann Taylor (1954) – NPR broadcaster
- Maggie Taylor (1979) – artist

== Miscellaneous ==
The film Crazy People (1990) was filmed at Chatham Hall.

Chatham Hall was briefly mentioned in the novel Betrayed.
