= Mount Airy, Pittsylvania County, Virginia =

Unincorporated community in Virginia, US

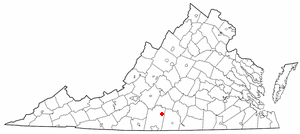
Location of Mount Airy, Virginia

Mount Airy is an unincorporated community in northeastern Pittsylvania County, Virginia, United States. Its altitude is 643 feet (196 m), and it is located at 36°56′35″N 79°11′32″W (36.9429172, -79.1922420), along State Route 40 between Gretna and Brookneal. It is included in the Danville, Virginia metropolitan area.

Sharswood Plantation lies a bit less than a mile south of Mount Airy.
