= Chatham railway station =

Chatham railway station may refer to

- Chatham railway station (Kent), England
- Chatham railway station, Melbourne, Australia
- Chatham railway station (Ontario), Canada
- Chatham station (Massachusetts), United States
- Chatham station (NJ Transit), New Jersey, United States
- Union Station (Chatham, New York), United States
- Chatham Southern Railway Depot, Virginia, United States
- 79th Street/Chatham station, Chicago, Illinois, United States
