= Oak Hill (Oak Ridge, Virginia) =

Historic house in Virginia, United States

- Formerly listed on the U.S. National Register of Historic Places
- Virginia Landmarks Register
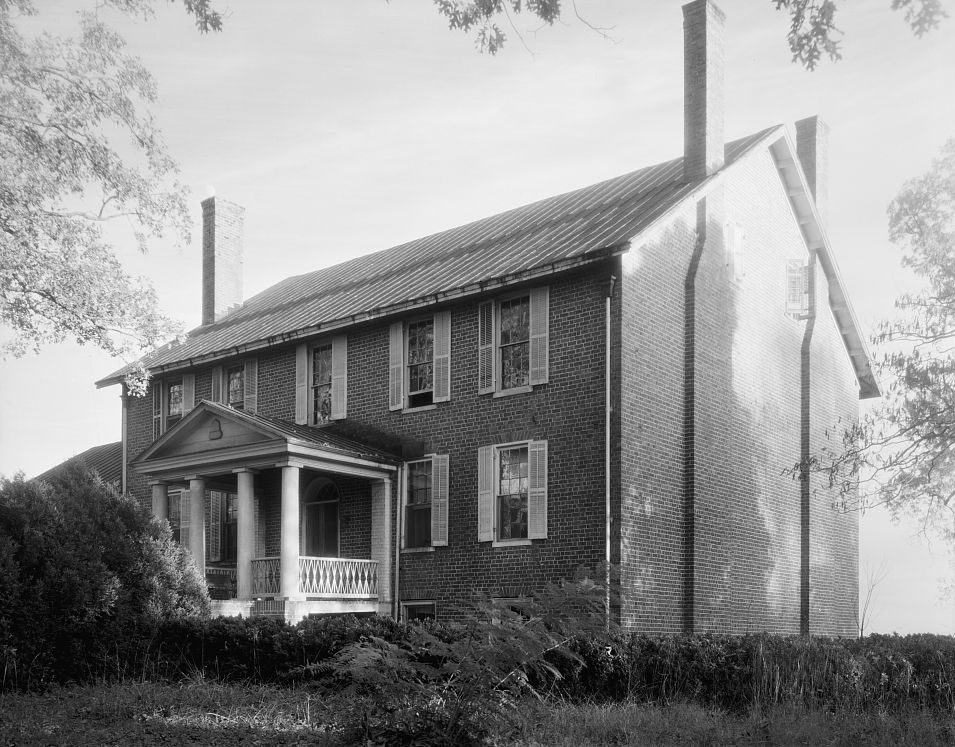
- Front of the house
- Nearest city: Oak Ridge, Virginia
- Area: 20 acres (8.1 ha)
- Built: 1823-1825, 1899
- Built by: Dejarnett, James
- Architectural style: Federal
- NRHP reference No.: 79003068
- VLR No.: 071-0026

Significant dates
- Added to NRHP: December 28, 1979
- Designated VLR: September 18, 1979
- Removed from NRHP: March 19, 2001
- Delisted VLR: March 19, 1997

Oak Hill was a historic plantation home located near Oak Ridge, Pittsylvania County, Virginia. It was built in 1823–1825, and was a 2 1/2-story, five-bay, Federal style brick dwelling with a gable roof. An addition was built in 1899. It was destroyed by fire in 1988.

It was listed on the National Register of Historic Places in 1979, and delisted in 2001.
