= Leesville Dam Archeological Site =

Archaeological site in Virginia, United States

- Leesville Dam Archaeological Site (44PY30)
- U.S. National Register of Historic Places
- Nearest city: Altavista, Virginia
- Area: 6 acres (2.4 ha)
- NRHP reference No.: 89001916
- Added to NRHP: November 2, 1989

The Leesville Dam Archaeological Site is a prehistoric Native American village site in Pittsylvania County, Virginia, near the town of Altavista. The site is located in the general vicinity of the Roanoke River, and is one of the most important Late Woodland period (c. AD 1200–1600) village sites in the area. It was listed on the National Register of Historic Places in 1989, at which time the site was covered by an agricultural field.

This archaeological site has been known to local residents of the area for some time, and was subjected to amateur collection of surface-level artifacts by the property owners. Human remains were discovered in 1941, and again in 1985. State and federal authorities were first notified of the site's existence in 1979, and the state Division of Historic Landmarks surveyed the site in 1986. At that time the site was determined to measure about 420 metres (1,380 ft) by 80 metres (260 ft), consistent with known sizes for a typical palisaded native village. Among the features identified in this survey was the large midden; artifacts recovered during the survey include ceramic and stone fragments, as well as worked copper pendants, as well as plant and animal remains.

The site is of particular importance because a significant portion of the upper Roanoke River watershed has been inundated by the creation of Leesville Lake. It is believed that this site will yield useful information regarding subsistence patterns during the Late Woodland period, especially with respect to the development of more sedentary agricultural villages. Evidence of a palisade would also suggest a level of conflict in the area over limited resources in the area.

== See also ==
- National Register of Historic Places listings in Pittsylvania County, Virginia
