= Emmanuel Episcopal Church (Chatham, Virginia) =

Historic Episcopal Church

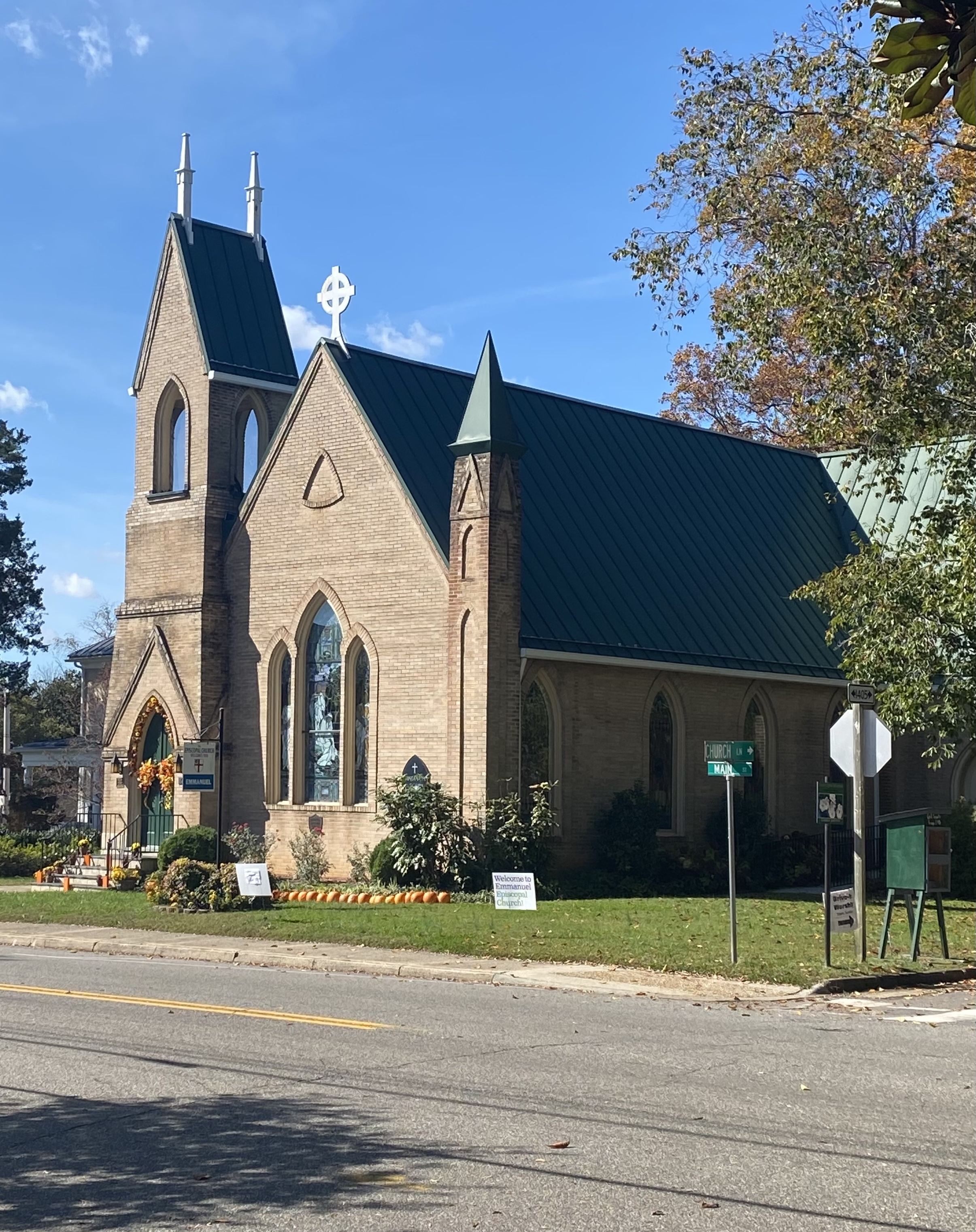
- Front view

- Location within Virginia
- 36.8281°N 79.3981°W
- Location: Chatham, Virginia
- Address: 66 Main St
- Country: United States
- Denomination: Episcopal
- Website: emmanuelepiscopalchurch.org

History
- Status: Church
- Founded: 1844
- Founder: Reverend George W. Dame
- Consecrated: May 25, 1844 (original building)

Architecture
- Style: Gothic
- Completed: 1880 (current building)

Specifications
- Materials: Brick

Administration
- Province: Washington
- Diocese: Southern Virginia

Clergy
- Bishop: Susan B. Haynes
- Rector: Reverend Becky Crites

Emmanuel Episcopal Church is a 19th-century Episcopal church located within the Chatham Historic District in Pittsylvania County, Virginia.

== History ==
Established in 1844 by the Reverend George W. Dame, a graduate of Hampden-Sydney College, Emmanuel is one of several Episcopal churches within Pittsylvania County founded by Reverend Dame.

In 1894, Emmanuel Rector Rev. Clevius Orlando Pruden helped to found Chatham Hall The parishioners at Emmanuel supported the founding of the school as well as the students through activities and housing. Students at Chatham Hall attended chapel services at Emmanuel until 1938 when the construction of St. Mary’s Chapel at Chatham Hall was completed.

== Architecture ==
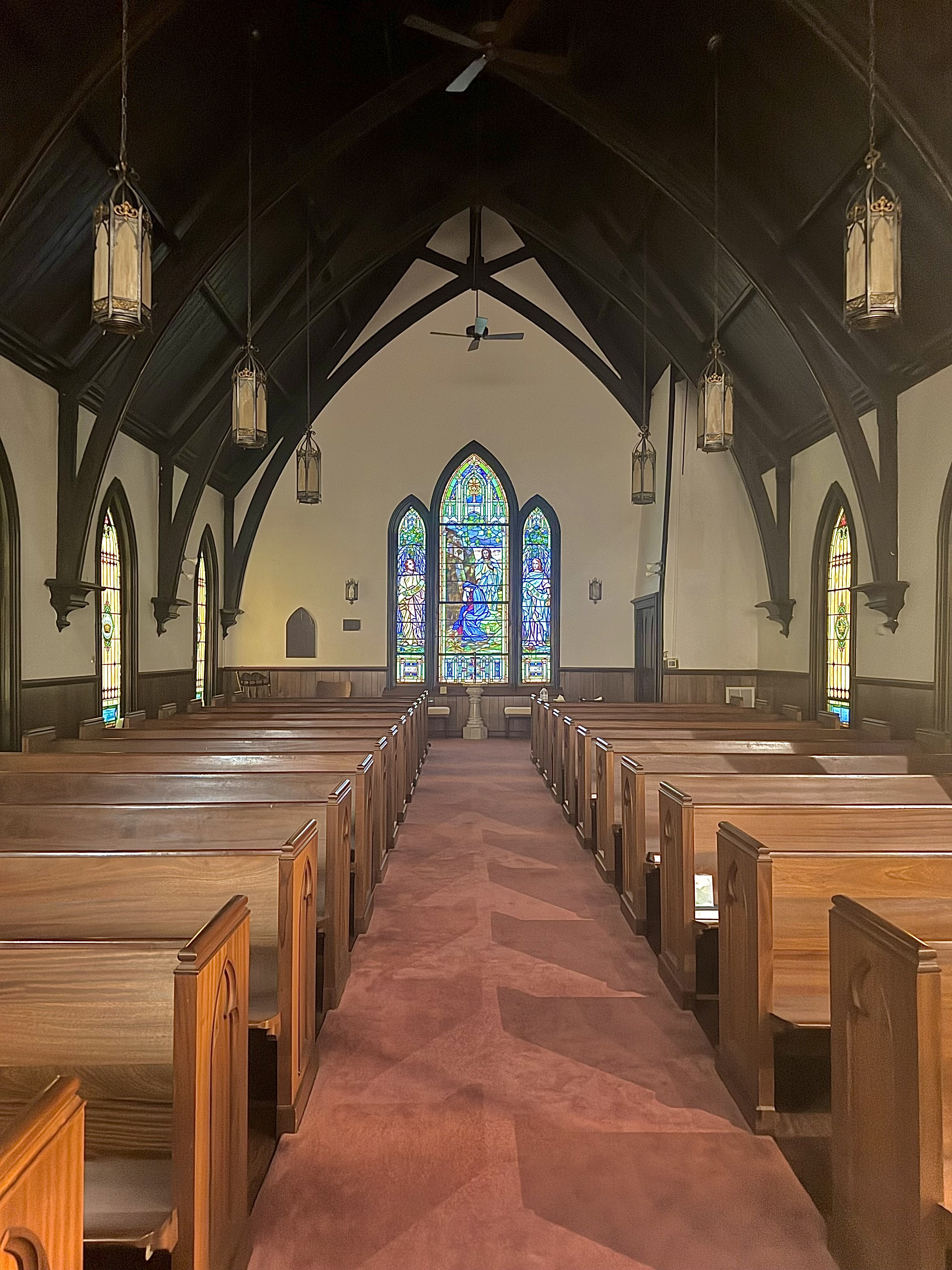
Nave, facing Baptismal Font & Narthex

The first wooden structure was built in 1844, but was then moved to Dry, Fork, Virginia, in order for a new, larger church to be built.

The current victorian church building dates from 1879. The church was originally almost identical to the carpenter gothic St. John's Episcopal Church, Mount Airy, Virginia, with a wooden clapboard exterior. An extensive remodel in 1917 added transepts, lengthened the nave, and encased the structure in buff-colored brick, unique among buildings within the area.

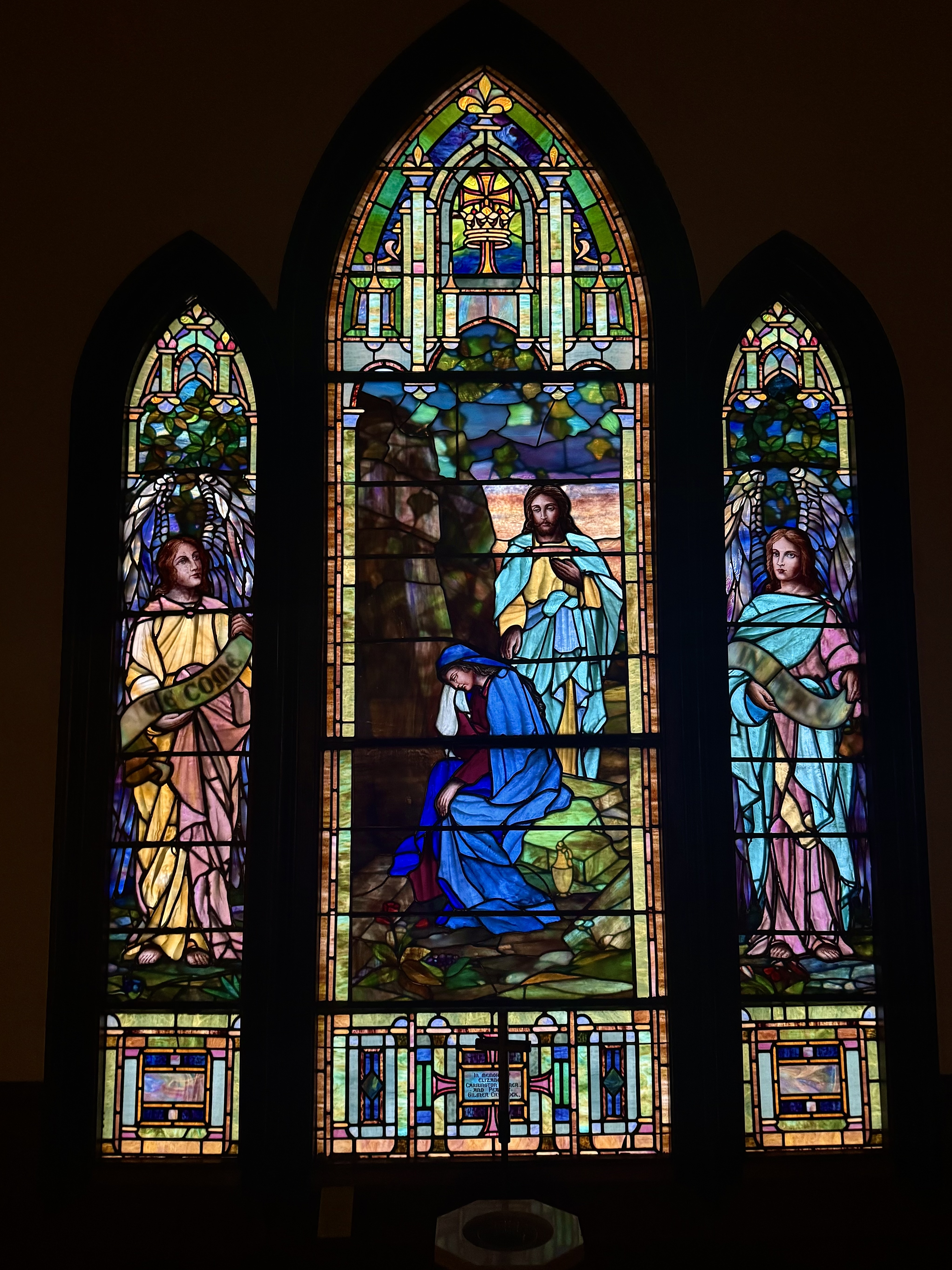
Triple-pointed Tiffany lancet window

Of particular note are the drapery stained glass windows, several of which are attributed to Tiffany Studios.
