= Chatham station (Virginia) =

Historic train station in Virginia, US

- Chatham Southern Railway Depot
- U.S. National Register of Historic Places
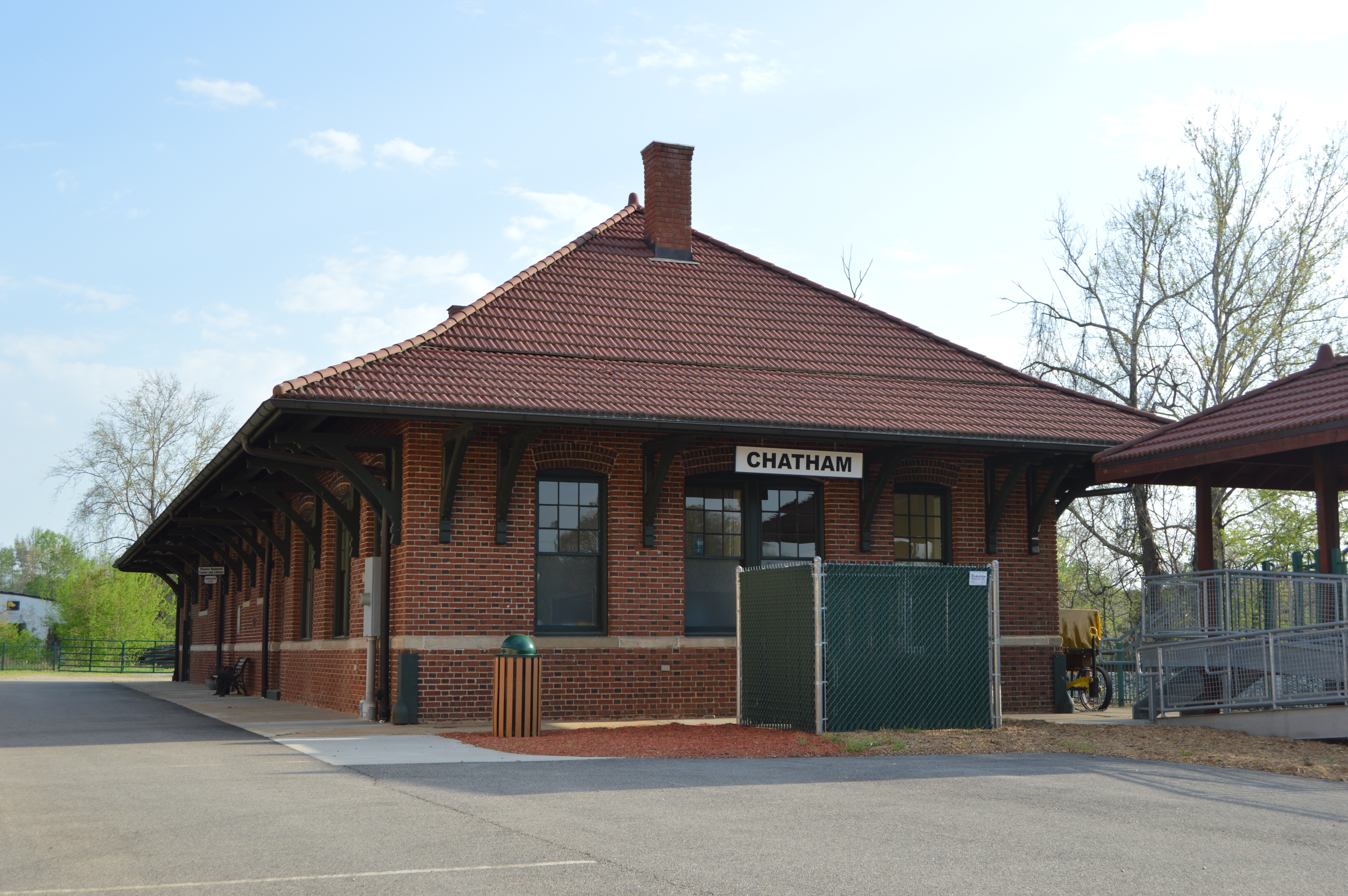
- Northern end of the depot

- Location within Virginia Location within the United States
- Location: 340 Whitehead St., Chatham, Virginia
- Coordinates: 36°49′15″N 79°24′9″W
- Area: Less than 1 acre (0.40 ha)
- Built: 1919
- NRHP reference No.: 15000550
- Added to NRHP: August 24, 2015

The Chatham Southern Railway Depot is a historic train station at 340 Whitehead Street in Chatham, Virginia.

Built in 1918–19 by the Southern Railway, it was a major hub of the city's economic activity until passenger service was discontinued in 1965, and freight service in 1975.

The building is a long rectangular single story masonry structure, from which a polygonal tower rises on 1 1/2 stories on the track side. It has a hipped roof with flared eaves supported by large wooden brackets.

It has been owned by the Pittsylvania County Historical Society since 2001, which plans to restore the building and use it as a veterans' museum.

The depot was listed on the National Register of Historic Places in 2015.

== See also ==
- National Register of Historic Places listings in Pittsylvania County, Virginia

Preceding station	Southern Railway	Following station
Dry Fork toward Birmingham	Main Line	Whittle toward Washington, D.C.
