= Phillip Craft House =

Historic house in Virginia, United States

- U.S. National Register of Historic Places
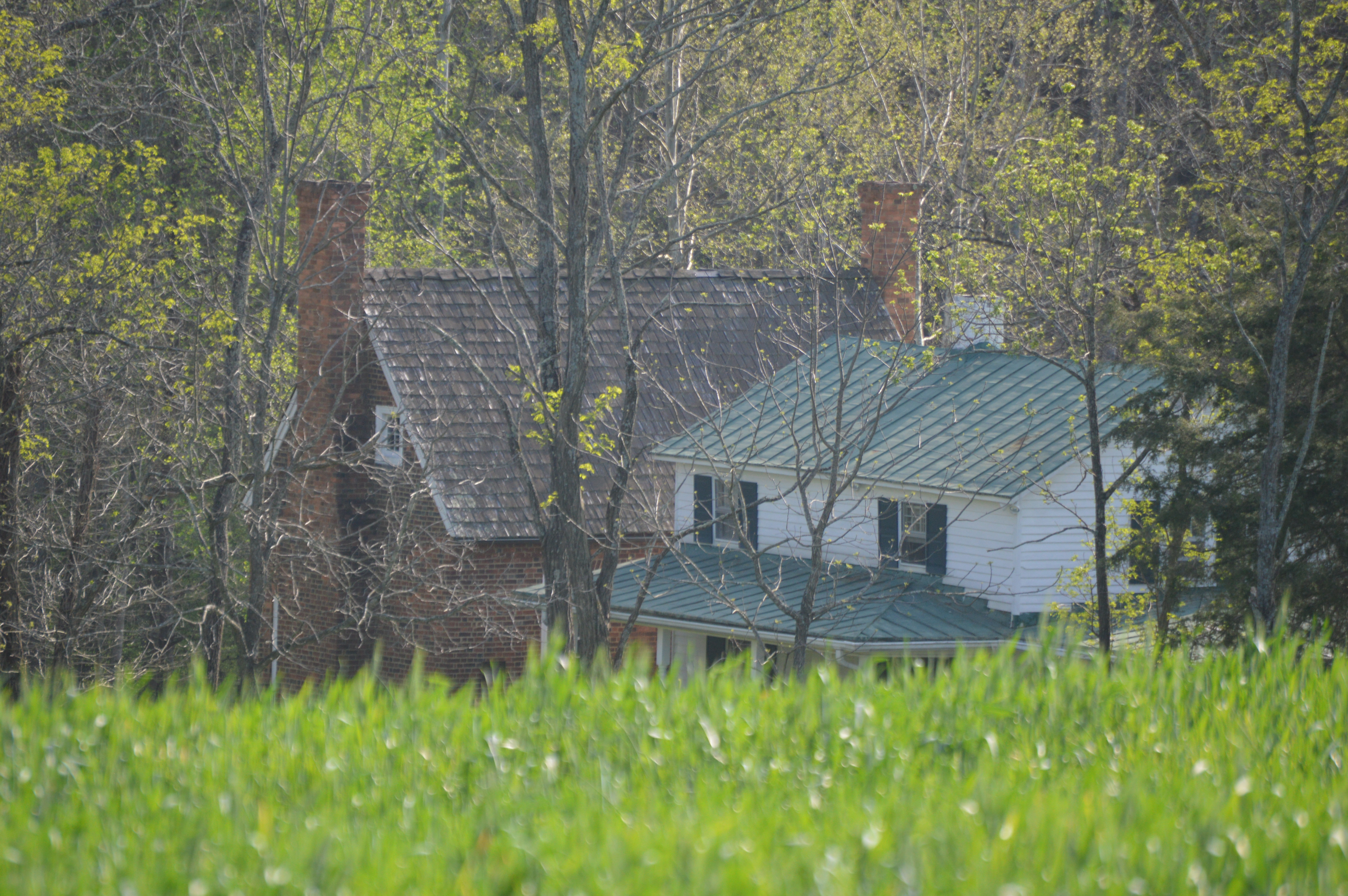
- photo taken a few days before its destruction by fire

- Location within Virginia Location within the United States
- Location: 1381 Old Red Eye Rd., near Redeye, Virginia
- Coordinates: 36°54′12″N 79°27′35″W
- Area: 1.7 acres (0.69 ha)
- Built: 1819
- Architectural style: Early Republic, Half-parlor plan
- NRHP reference No.: 01000144
- Added to NRHP: February 16, 2001

The Phillip Craft House was a historic house at 1381 Old Red Eye Road, in rural Pittsylvania County, Virginia, near the hamlet of Redeye. It was a 1 1/2-story brick structure with a gabled roof. A wood-frame addition of 20th-century construction extended to the side. Built about 1819, it was one of the few surviving early 19th-century brick buildings in the county.

The house was listed on the National Register of Historic Places in 2001. It was destroyed by fire on April 18, 2017.

== See also ==
- National Register of Historic Places listings in Pittsylvania County, Virginia
