= Thomas Claiborne Creasy House =

Historic house in Virginia, United States

- U.S. National Register of Historic Places
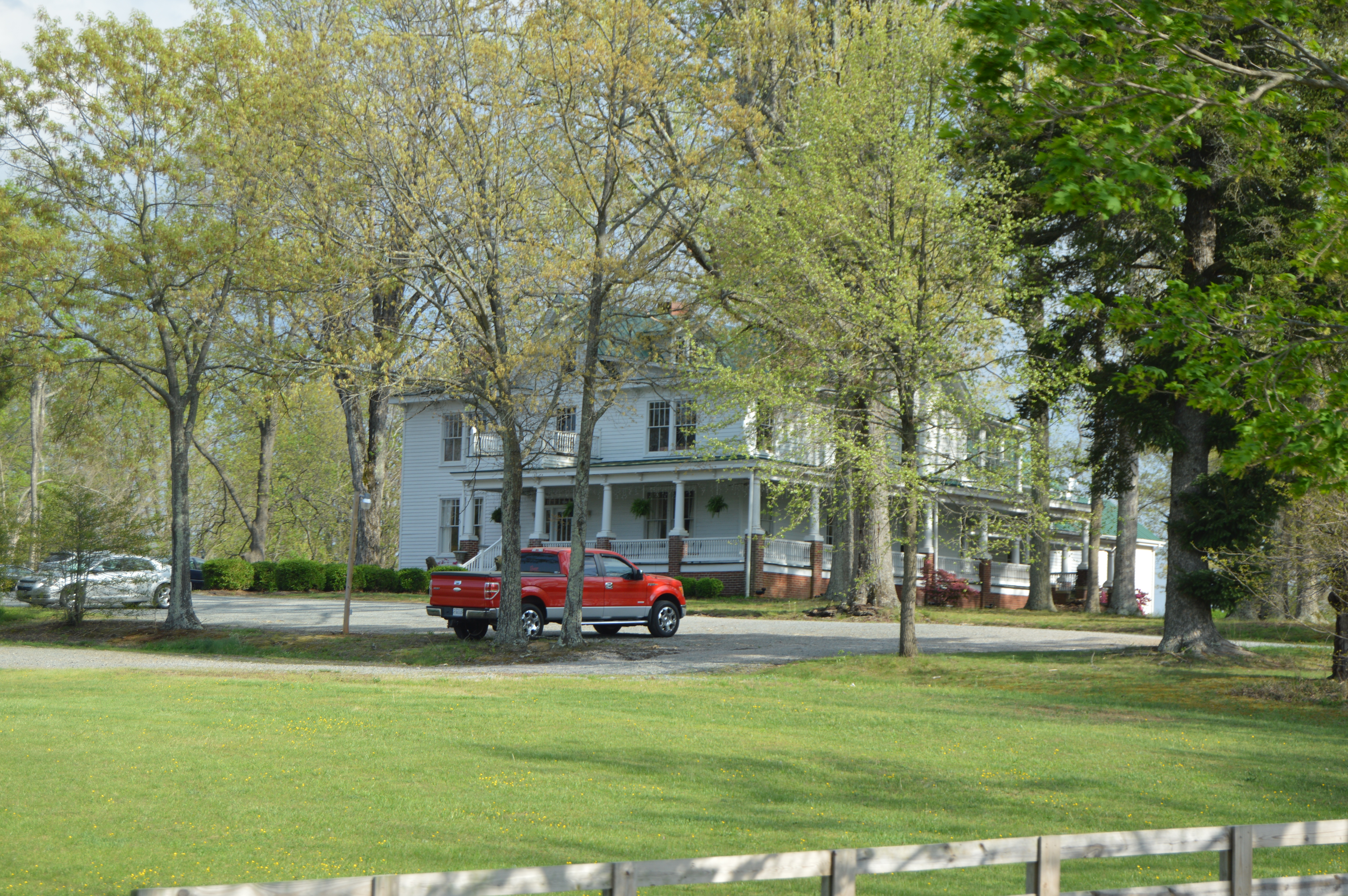
- Distant view from northwest

- Location within Virginia Location within the United States
- Location: 415 S Main St., Gretna, Virginia
- Coordinates: 36°56′54″N 79°21′41″W
- Area: 14 acres (5.7 ha)
- Built: 1840
- Architectural style: Italianate; Colonial Revival; Craftsman
- NRHP reference No.: 15000018
- Added to NRHP: February 17, 2015

The Thomas Claiborne Creasy House is a historic house at 415 South Main Street in Gretna, Virginia. It is a 2 1/2-story wood-frame structure, built in 1840 with later additions that substantially complemented the original construction. The original main block is Italianate in style, with Colonial Revival addition made in the 1880s and a Craftsman addition in 1923. A Colonial Revival porch wraps around much of the structure, unifying the parts. The house stands on a large landscaped parcel that includes several surviving farm outbuildings and the family cemetery of the Creasys. Thomas Creasy, who bought the 1840 house and substantially enlarged it, was one of Gretna's wealthiest businessmen of the post-Reconstruction era. The property is now used as a function and event facility.

The property was listed on the National Register of Historic Places in 2015.
