= John and Nancy Yeatts House =

Historic house in Virginia, United States

- U.S. National Register of Historic Places
- Virginia Landmarks Register
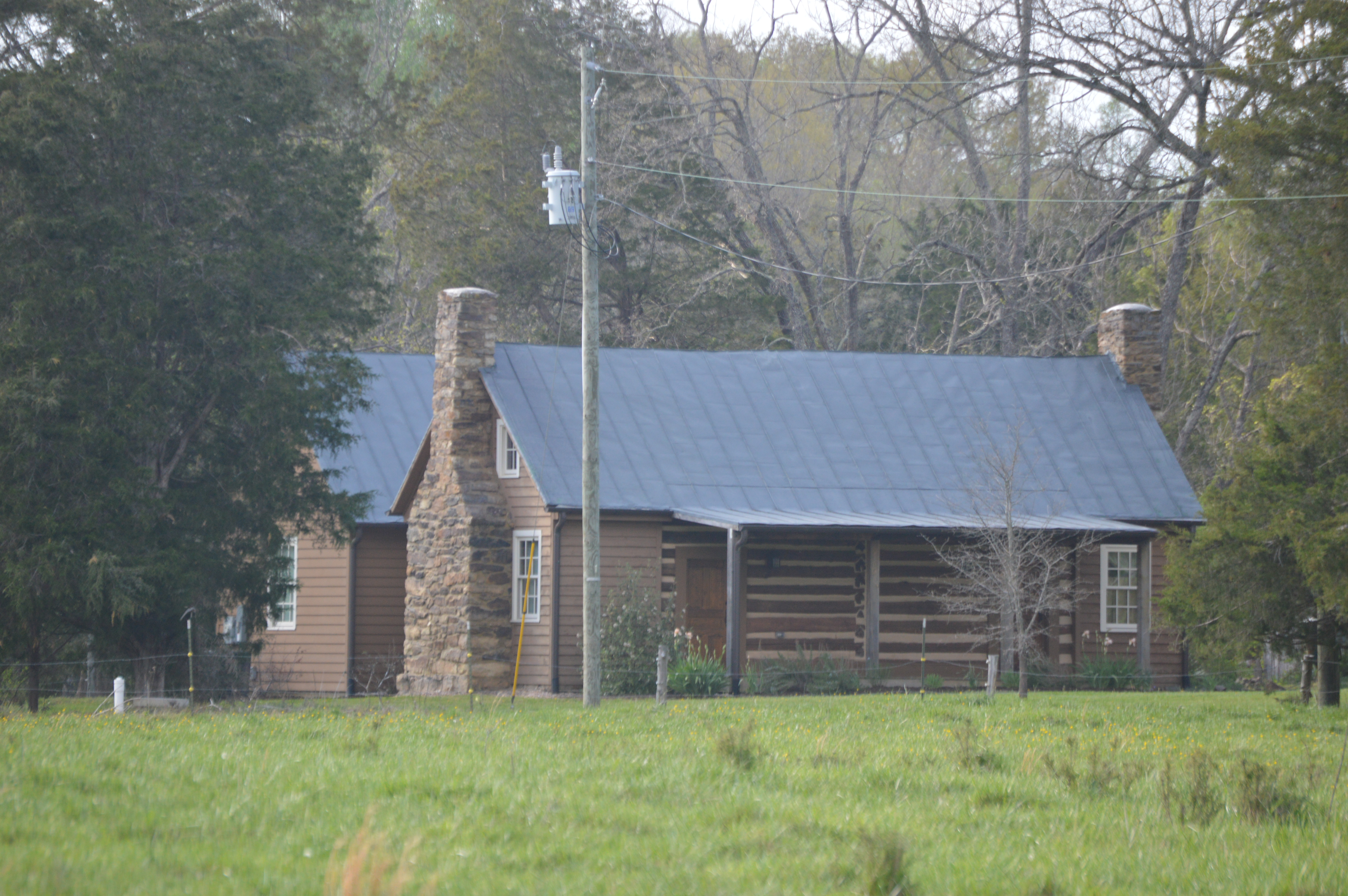
- Front of the house

- Location within Virginia Location within the United States
- Location: VA 756, near Chatham, Virginia
- Coordinates: 36°53′33″N 79°25′40″W
- Area: less than one acre
- Built: 1808
- Architectural style: Log, double pen
- NRHP reference No.: 09000173
- VLR No.: 071-5250

Significant dates
- Added to NRHP: March 25, 2009
- Designated VLR: December 18, 2008

John and Nancy Yeatts House is a historic home located near Chatham, Pittsylvania County, Virginia. The log double pen house was built in two sections with the original section built about 1808, and expanded probably in the 1820s but before 1860. The original section has v-notched logs, a stone gable end chimney, and front and back entries. The later section is of similar construction and also has a stone gable end chimney. The two sections are topped by a standing seam metal gable roof. It is representative of a finely crafted and well-preserved vernacular log dwelling.

It was listed on the National Register of Historic Places in 2009.
