= Pittsylvania County Clerk's Office =

- Clerk's Office
- U.S. National Register of Historic Places
- Virginia Landmarks Register
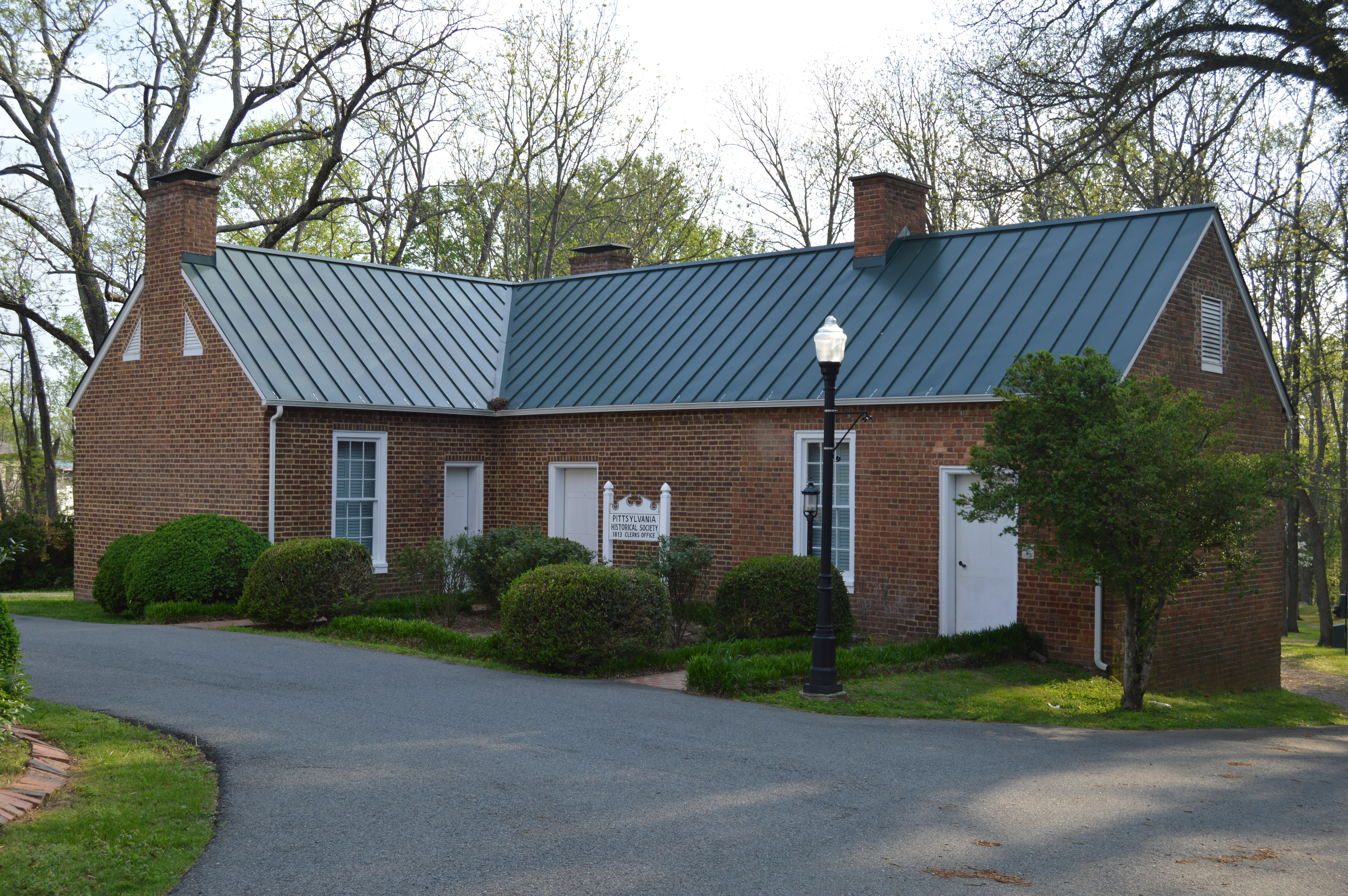
- Front of the office

- Location within Virginia Location within the United States
- Location: Main St., Chatham, Virginia
- Coordinates: 36°49′36″N 79°24′1″W
- Area: 0.5 acres (0.20 ha)
- Built: 1812
- NRHP reference No.: 82004580
- VLR No.: 187-0002

Significant dates
- Added to NRHP: July 8, 1982
- Designated VLR: October 20, 1981

The Pittsylvania County Clerk's Office is a historic county clerk's office located at Chatham in Pittsylvania County, Virginia. It was built in 1812, and is a one-story, L-shaped brick structure. It housed the county clerk's office until 1853, when those offices were moved to the newly constructed Pittsylvania County Courthouse. The building was restored by the Pittsylvania County Historical Society and houses a small museum.

It was listed on the National Register of Historic Places in 1982.
