= Little Cherrystone =

Historic house in Virginia, United States

- U.S. National Register of Historic Places
- Virginia Landmarks Register
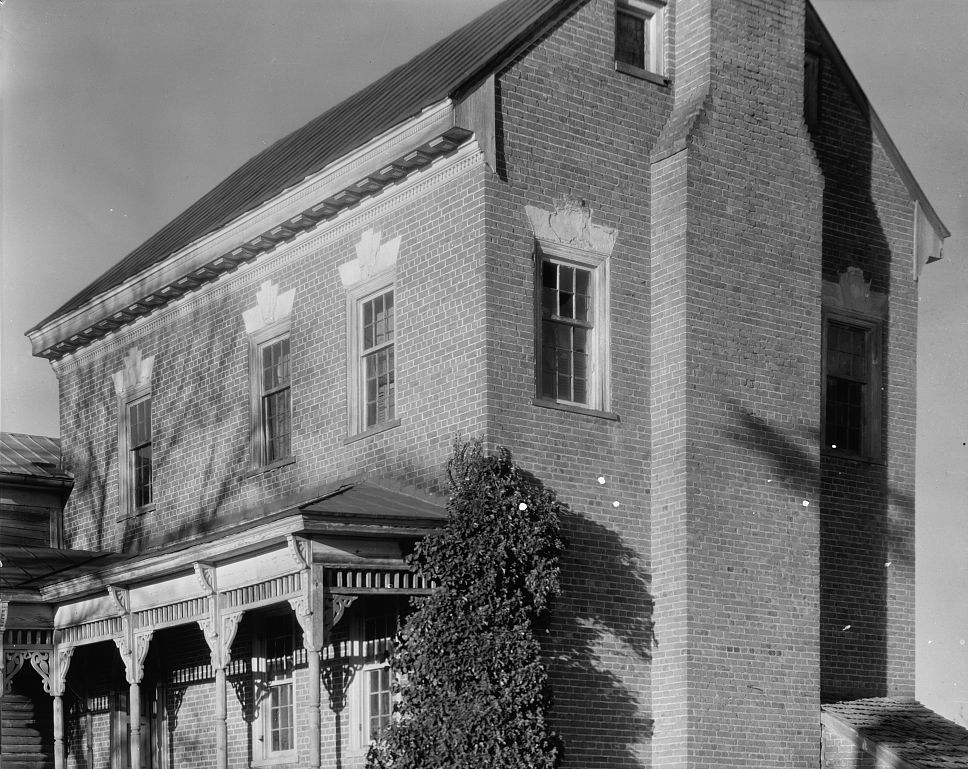
- Moses House, Carnegie Survey of the South, 1930s

- Location within Virginia Location within the United States
- Location: N of jct. of Rtes. 703 and 832, near Chatham, Virginia
- Coordinates: 36°49′19″N 79°21′27″W
- Area: 0 acres (0 ha)
- Built: c. 1800
- Architectural style: Federal
- NRHP reference No.: 69000269
- VLR No.: 071-0036

Significant dates
- Added to NRHP: November 12, 1969
- Designated VLR: September 9, 1969

Little Cherrystone, also known as Moses House and Wooding House, is a historic home located near Chatham, Pittsylvania County, Virginia. The main house was built in several sections and consists of two major building units plus at least two minor sections. The oldest section is a one-story frame structure in two sections. It is connected by a two-story frame hyphen to a two-story, Federal style brick structure built about 1800. It has a gable roof and exterior end chimney.

It was listed on the National Register of Historic Places in 1969.
