= Interscholastic Equestrian Association =

American school-age equestrian association

- Abbreviation: IEA
- Formation: 2002
- Founder: Roxane Durant, Myron Leff, Wayne Ackerer and Tim Boone
- Legal status: Nonprofit Organization
- Purpose: Youth Equestrian Sports

The Interscholastic Equestrian Association (IEA) is a nonprofit organization that gives youth in grades 4-12 the opportunity to compete in team and individual equestrian competition without the financial outlay of owning a horse. IEA offers competition across three disciplines: hunt seat, western, and dressage. Within each discipline, there are divisions for beginning through advanced riders. Riders compete on horses unfamiliar to them, and there are regulations for the placement of riders new to IEA to account for the unique format. IEA was founded in spring of 2002, and has since grown its membership to 14,500 members across 46 states. Teams can be formed through a school or riding stables.

== Hunt seat ==
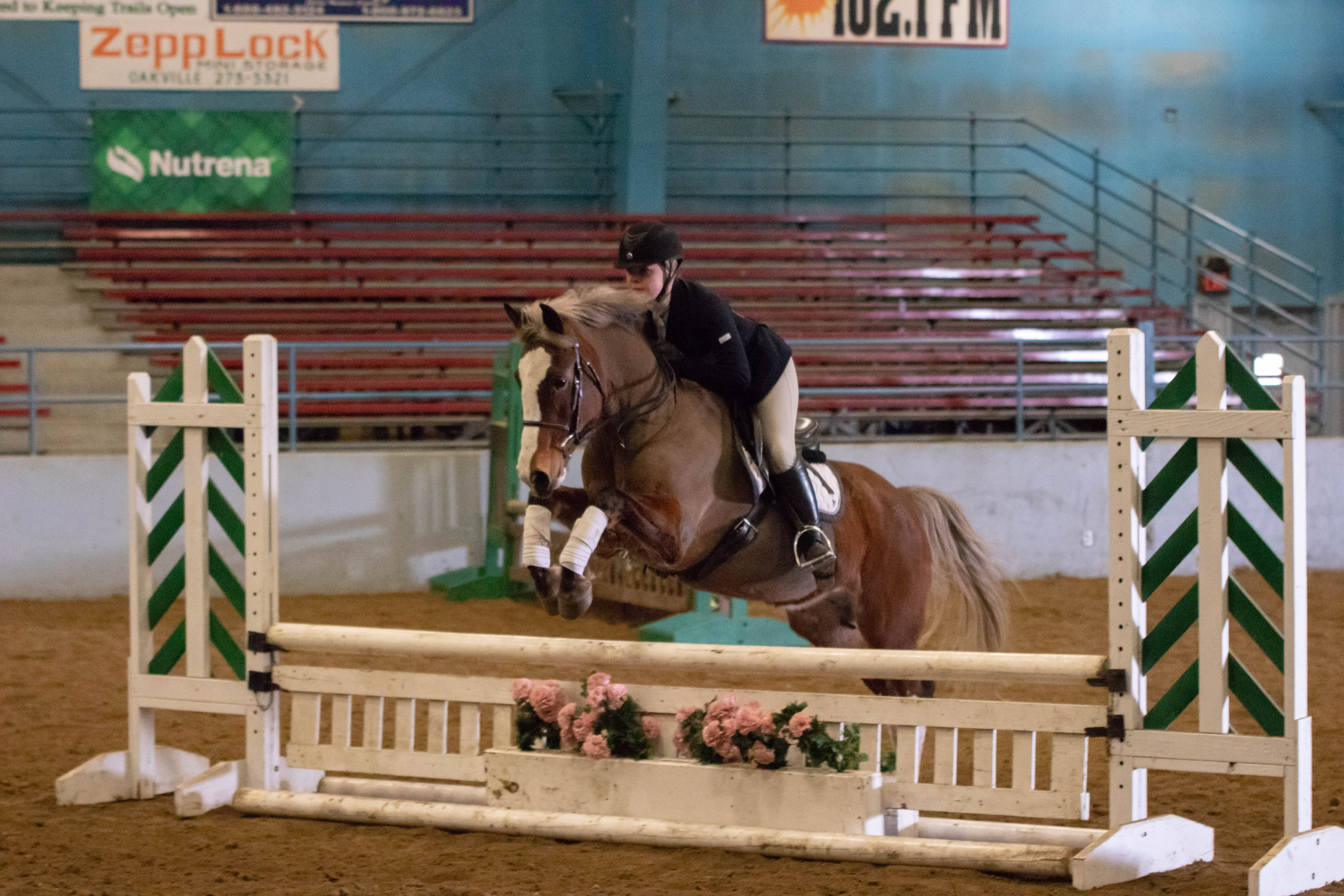
A Varsity Open Over Fences rider jumps a fence at the 2019 IEA Zone 9 Finals

The hunt seat discipline offers both over fences classes and flat classes, judged on the riders equitation. Within hunt seat 11 divisions are offered. High school members can compete in either Varsity Open over fences (fences set at 2'6), Varsity Intermediate over fences (fences set at 2ft), or Junior Varsity Novice over fences (cross rails). Riders competing in these classes must also enter the corresponding flat classes. There are two flat only divisions; JV Beginner walk-trot-canter, and JV Beginner walk-trot. Middle school members can compete in Future Intermediate over fences (fences set at 2ft) or Future Novice over fences (cross rails), and the corresponding flat classes. There are two flat-only middle school divisions as well; Future Beginner walk/trot/canter, and Future Beginner walk/trot. For the 2019-2020 season, IEA introduced the Intro division for 4th and 5th grade riders. Intro riders may compete in Intro walk/trot/canter or Intro walk/trot, which do not accumulate team points.

== Western ==
The western division offers classes in both western horsemanship and reining. Both are judged on the rider's overall equitation and how well they execute the pattern. Riders that enter reining classes must also compete in at least two horsemanship classes in the corresponding division. High school members can compete in Varsity Open Horsemanship and Varsity Open Reining, Varsity Intermediate Horsemanship and Varsity Intermediate Reining, Junior Varsity Novice Horsemanship, and Junior Varsity Novice Reining prep (an optional class that does not count for points). There are two divisions that only offer horsemanship classes; Junior Varsity Beginner walk/jog/lope, and Junior Varsity Beginner walk/jog. Middle school members can compete in Future Intermediate Horsemanship and Reining, Future Novice Horsemanship and reining prep, Future Beginner walk/jog/lope, or Future Beginner walk/jog. Similar to hunt seat, IEA introduced the Intro division for 4th and 5th grade riders for the 2019-2020 season. Intro riders may compete in Intro walk/jog/lope and Intro walk/jog, which do not accumulate team points.

== Dressage ==
Within the dressage discipline, two types of classes are offered: Dressage Test and Dressage Seat Equitation (DSE). There are four divisions offered, Open, Intermediate, Novice, Beginner and Intro. Level specific dressage tests are only offered in the Open, Intermediate and Novice divisions. For Dressage Seat Equitation classes, they are run similar to a hunt seat flat class, but level-appropriate individual testing may also be a part of the class. Dressage was a pilot program for the 2018-2019 season and was officially approved as part of IEA for the 2019-2020 season.

== Competition ==
IEA competitions are run differently from a traditional horse show. The host team provides most of the horses for riders to draw, with established teams also contributing horses. Prior to competition, each horse is schooled or warmed up by a non-competing rider or trainer, and competitors watch and take notes. After the completion of schooling, the horse draw (random selection of horses for the riders in the class) is announced so the riders know which horse they are riding. Horses are selected for each class based on the horses ability and suitability for that division. For example, the horses in the Novice and Beginner divisions will generally be quieter, and Open mounts will be more talented or difficult horses. Each rider mounts their horse and immediately enters the ring after adjusting their stirrups. Hunt Seat Over Fences riders are permitted to jump two warm-up fences in a pre-determined pattern before their class. Since each rider is on an unfamiliar horse that is new to them, this allows the judge to fairly judge each rider on how well they can ride an unfamiliar horse, which levels the playing field.

== Points and postseason competition ==
Regular season points are as follows:

1st place: 7 points

2nd place: 5 points

3rd place: 4 points

4th place: 3 points

5th place: 2 points

6th place: 1 point

7th place and under: 0 Points

Each rider is allowed to compete in a maximum of 5 shows per season. Hunt Seat riders in Zones 1, 2, 3, 4, 5, 10, and 11 need 18 points to qualify for Regionals and riders in Zones 6 ,7, 8, and 9 need 15 points. Western riders need 15 points to qualify for Regionals. Each region can determine the number of riders that it sends to Zone Finals, and each Zone can send either one or two riders to National Finals based on the size of the zone.

Teams can also qualify for postseason competition. Prior to the draw, coaches chooses a point rider for each class, and only the point riders placing will count towards team points, therefore a large team doesn't have an advantage. The teams with the highest point totals at the end of the season will qualify for postseason competition.

== See also ==
- Intercollegiate Horse Show Association
- National Collegiate Equestrian Association
- United States Hunter/Jumper Association
- National Reining Horse Association
- United States Dressage Federation
- American Quarter Horse Association
- Pony Club
