= Sharswood Plantation =

Plantation house in Pittsylvania County, Virginia

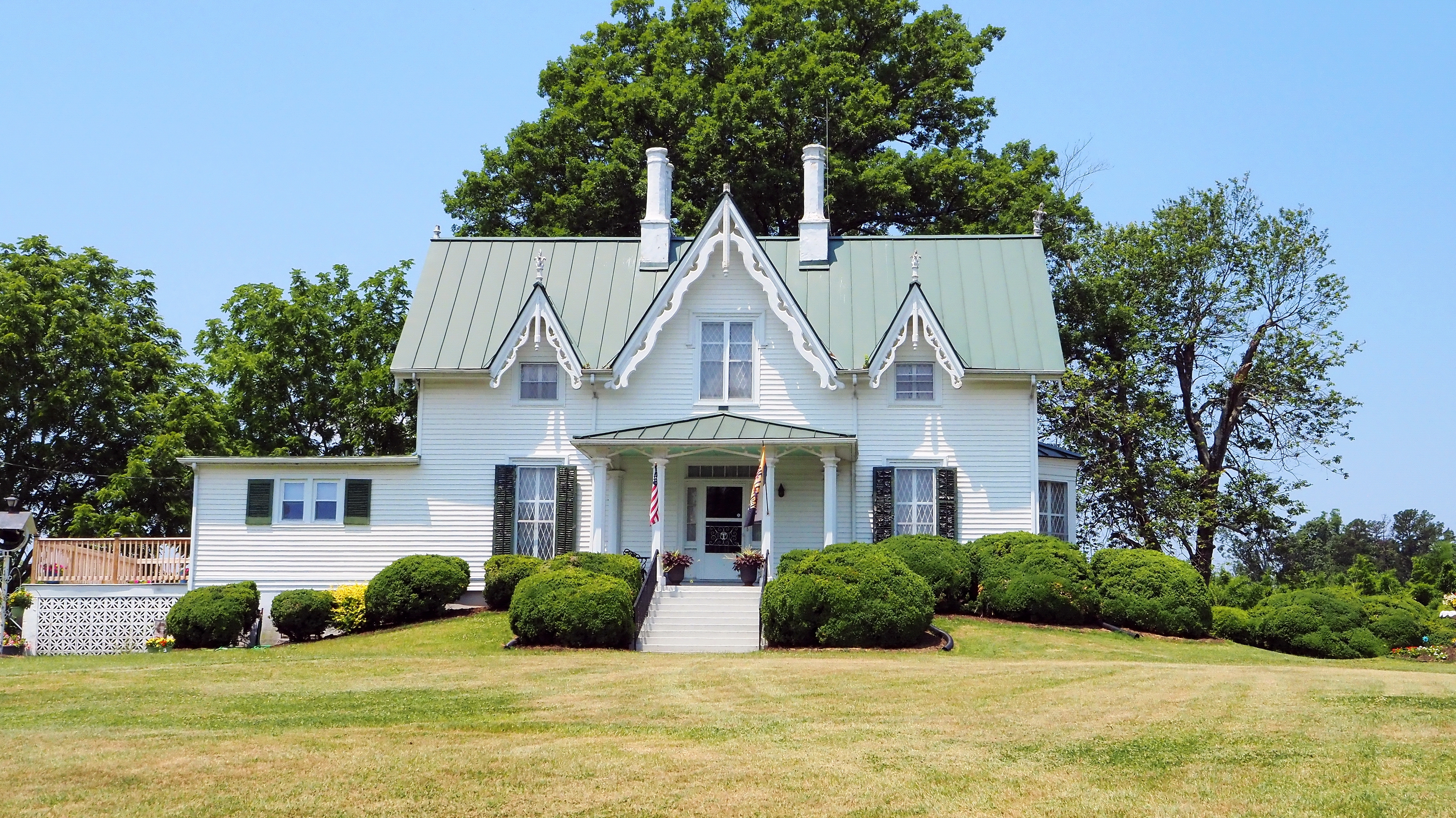
- Sharswood House in 2023
- Alternative names: Sharswood Manor Estate; Miller Plantation

General information
- Status: active
- Type: plantation house
- Architectural style: Gothic Revival
- Location: 5685 Riceville Road; Gretna, Pittsylvania County, Virginia, U.S., United States
- Coordinates: 36°55′49″N 79°11′26″W
- Owner: Frederick Miller

Height
- Roof: metal

Technical details
- Floor count: 2
- Floor area: 3200 square feet
- Grounds: 10.5 acres

Design and construction
- Architect: Alexander Jackson Davis

Sharswood Plantation, also known as Sharswood Manor Estate, is a historic plantation house in Pittsylvania County, Virginia, about a mile south of the unincorporated community of Mount Airy. Prior to the American Civil War, Sharswood operated as a 2,000-acre tobacco plantation under the ownership of Charles Edwin Miller and Nathaniel Crenshaw Miller. The Gothic Revival house was designed by New York architect Alexander Jackson Davis. The plantation remained in the Miller family until 1917, when it was purchased by the Thompson family. In 2020, the estate was purchased by Frederick Miller, a descendant of people enslaved at Sharswood.

== History ==
Prior to the American Civil War, Sharswood operated as a 2,000-acre tobacco plantation under the ownership of two brothers, Charles Edwin Miller and Nathaniel Crenshaw Miller. The plantation was built in Virginia, located outside the town of Gretna, between Danville and Lynchburg.

A wood-frame structure, likely the original plantation house, was built before 1800. After 1820, the original house was divided into a duplex and used as living quarters for slaves. In the 1850s, a house, designed by New York architect Alexander Jackson Davis, was built in the Gothic Revival style for the Miller family. The house features a steep roof, polygonal chimney stacks, lacy bargeboards with finials, fleur-de-lis crockets, a one-story porch with octagonal columns and tracery, and diamond-paned windows with hood molds. The plantation also contained twelve outbuildings, many of which were slave quarters.

In 1860, the ages of those enslaved at Sharswood ranged from one to seventy-two years of age. According to that year's census, thirty-five enslaved people were twelve or older and twenty-three were children. Thirty-one enslaved people at Sharswood were female. After emancipation, ten formerly enslaved people signed labor contracts with Nathaniel Miller to stay on as sharecroppers.

In 1917, the plantation was bought by the Thompson family, who owned it for over a century.

In 2020, the estate was purchased for $225,000 by Frederick Miller, a retired United States Air Force veteran. Frederick Miller, who is African-American, is the great-great-grandson of Violet and David Miller, who were both enslaved at Sharswood. His great-grandmother, Sarah Miller, was born in 1868 at Sharswood and was recorded as a member of the household in the Slave Birth Index. Miller was unaware of his ancestral connection to Sharswood at the time of his purchase. Miller founded the Sharswood Foundation, a non-profit organization that supports the upkeep and historical preservation of the plantation. In June 2022, the plantation hosted a large Juneteenth celebration with over 1,000 people in attendance. A second Juneteenth celebration was held on June 18, 2023.

Sharswood includes the 3,200 square-foot house and a 10.5-acre estate with various small buildings, including an overseer's office and a cabin that previously served as a kitchen, laundry, and slave quarters. There is also a slave cemetery on the Sharswood estate.
