= Windsor (Cascade, Virginia) =

Historic house in Virginia, United States

- U.S. National Register of Historic Places
- Virginia Landmarks Register
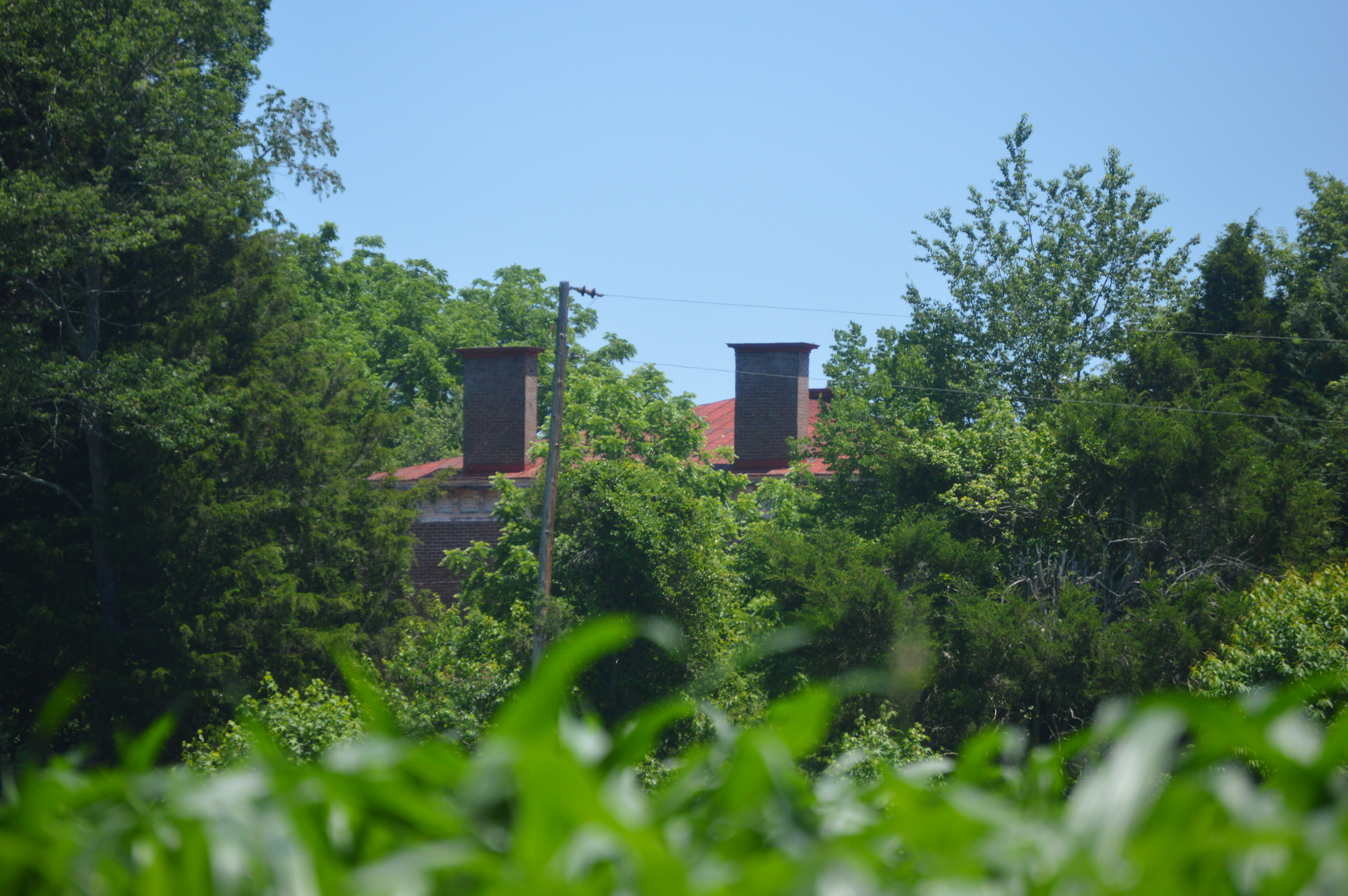
- Seen from Mountain Run Road

- Location within Virginia Location within the United States
- Nearest city: Cascade, Virginia
- Area: 38 acres (15 ha)
- Built: 1862
- Architectural style: Italianate, Georgian
- NRHP reference No.: 80004211
- VLR No.: 071-0035

Significant dates
- Added to NRHP: July 30, 1980
- Designated VLR: April 15, 1980

Windsor is a historic plantation complex located near Cascade, Pittsylvania County, Virginia, United States. The house was completed in 1862, and is a two-story, five-bay Georgian-style brick dwelling, with Italianate-style ornamentation. It has a shallow hipped roof and double-pile, central-hall plan. The main section is flanked by one-story, one bay wings. Also on the property are the contributing original school / playhouse, kitchen, smoke house, laundry, gas house, two slave houses, and a spring house, barn / horse stable, Gris Mill.

It was listed on the National Register of Historic Places in 1980.
