= Cherrystone, Virginia =

Unincorporated community in Virginia, United States

Cherrystone
- Unincorporated community
- Location within the Commonwealth of Virginia Cherrystone (the United States)
- Coordinates: 37°18′22″N 76°00′6″W
- Country: United States
- State: Virginia
- County: Northampton
- Elevation: 7 ft (2.1 m)
- Time zone: UTC−5 (Eastern (EST))
  - Summer (DST): UTC−4 (EDT)
- GNIS feature ID: 1492749

Cherrystone is an unincorporated community in Northampton County, Virginia, United States.
