= Burnett's Diner =

Historic commercial building in Virginia, United States

- U.S. National Register of Historic Places
- Virginia Landmarks Register
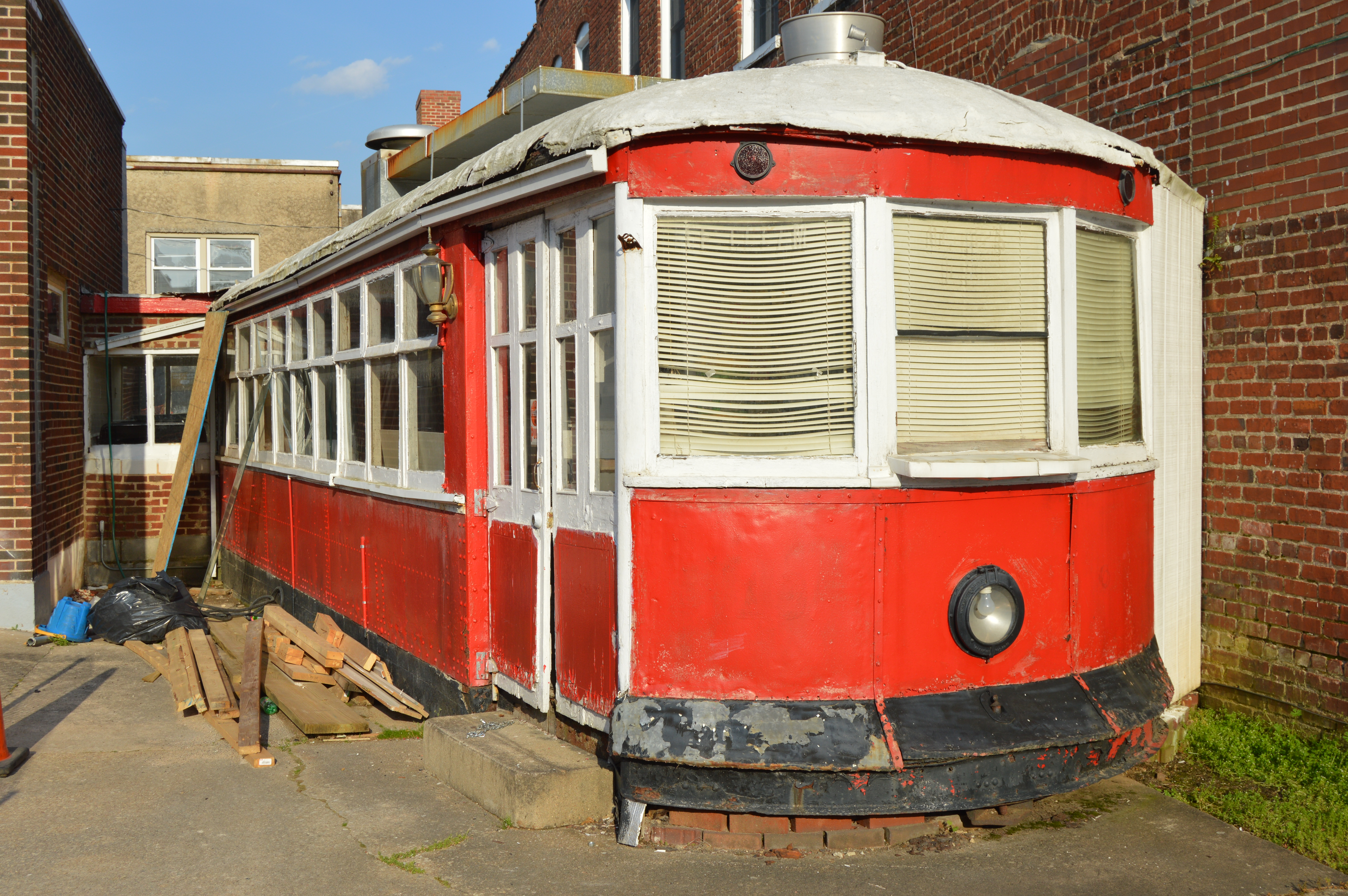
- Front and side

- Location within Virginia Location within the United States
- Location: 19 S. Main St., Chatham, Virginia
- Coordinates: 36°49′32″N 79°23′55″W
- Area: Less than 1 acre (0.40 ha)
- Built: 1939
- MPS: Diners of Virginia MPS
- NRHP reference No.: 96001451
- VLR No.: 187-0013

Significant dates
- Added to NRHP: December 16, 1996
- Designated VLR: June 19, 1996

Burnett's Diner, also known as Main Street Lunch, S&K Diner, and Chatham Cafe, was a historic converted streetcar diner located at Chatham in Pittsylvania County, Virginia. It was built in 1923, and used as a streetcar in Danville, Virginia. It was brought to Chatham in 1939, and converted for use as a diner. It was restored in the 1980s.

It was listed on the National Register of Historic Places in 1996.
