= Cascade, Virginia =

Unincorporated community in Virginia, US

Coordinates: 36°33′52″N 79°40′11″W

Cascade is an unincorporated community in Pittsylvania County, in the U.S. state of Virginia.

Windsor was listed on the National Register of Historic Places in 1974.
