= Gretna Commercial Historic District =

Historic district in Virginia, United States

- U.S. National Register of Historic Places
- U.S. Historic district
- Virginia Landmarks Register
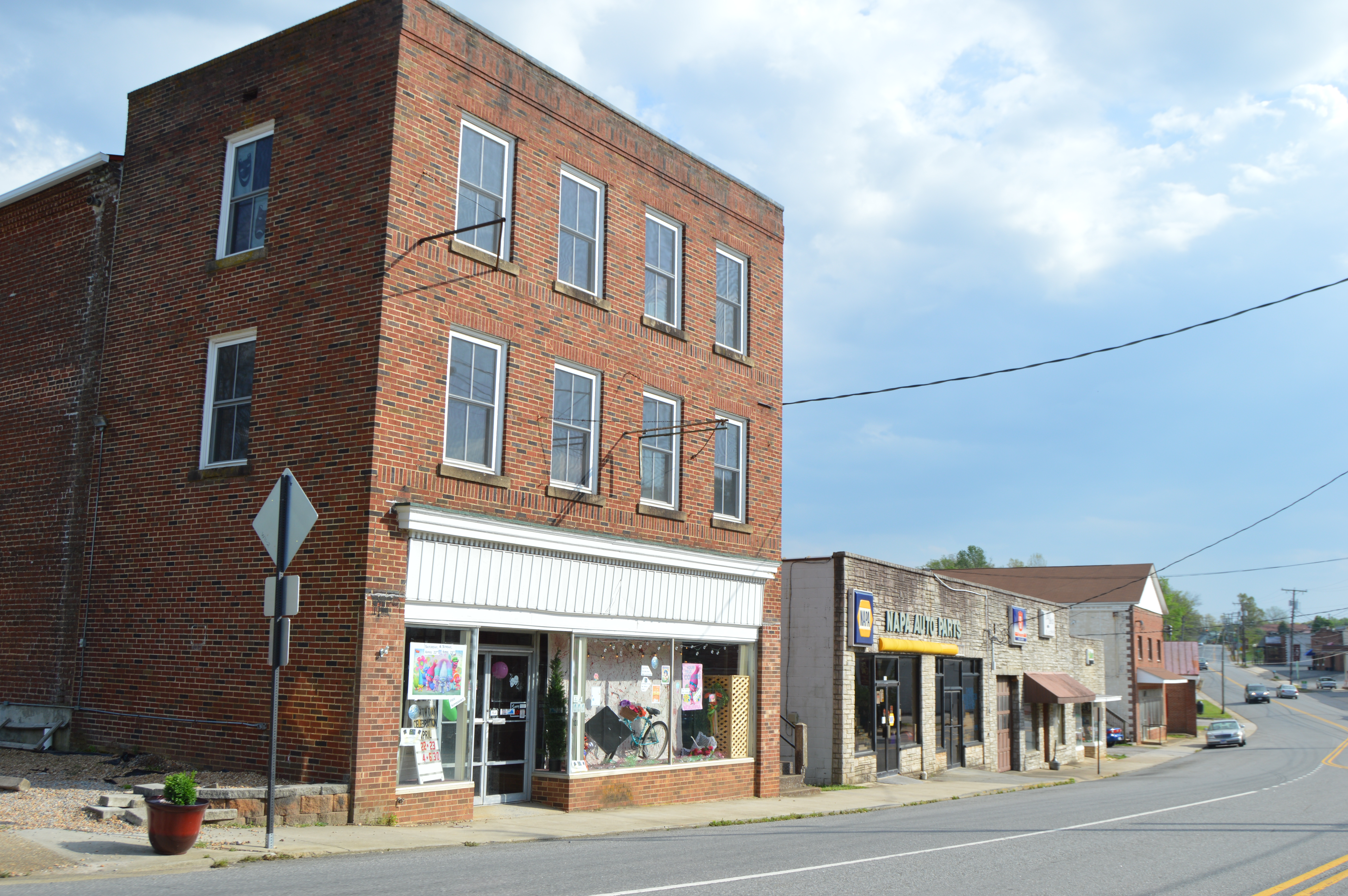
- Main Street downtown

- Location within Virginia Location within the United States
- Location: N. and S. Main and Henry Sts., Gretna, Virginia
- Coordinates: 36°57′08″N 79°21′40″W
- Area: 6.5 acres (2.6 ha)
- Built: 1881
- Architectural style: Late 19th and early 20th century revivals, Late 19th and early 20th century American movements
- NRHP reference No.: 13000342
- VLR No.: 227-5002

Significant dates
- Added to NRHP: May 28, 2013
- Designated VLR: March 31, 2013

Gretna Commercial Historic District is a national historic district located at Gretna, Pittsylvania County, Virginia. The district encompasses 26 contributing buildings in the central business district of Gretna. The district primarily developed in the early-to-mid-20th century, with buildings dated between about 1881 and 1963. Notable buildings include the Thomas C. and Robert H. Creasy storehouse (1881), Masonic hall (1902), Bank of Elba (1907), Dalton building (c. 1914), W.D. Love and Co. grocery store (c. 1921), Amoco Service Station (1940), former Gretna Fire Station and Town Hall, and Berger Motor Co. (mid-1940s).

It was listed on the National Register of Historic Places in 2013.
