= Bill's Diner =

Historic commercial building in Virginia, United States

- U.S. National Register of Historic Places
- U.S. Historic district – Contributing property
- Virginia Landmarks Register
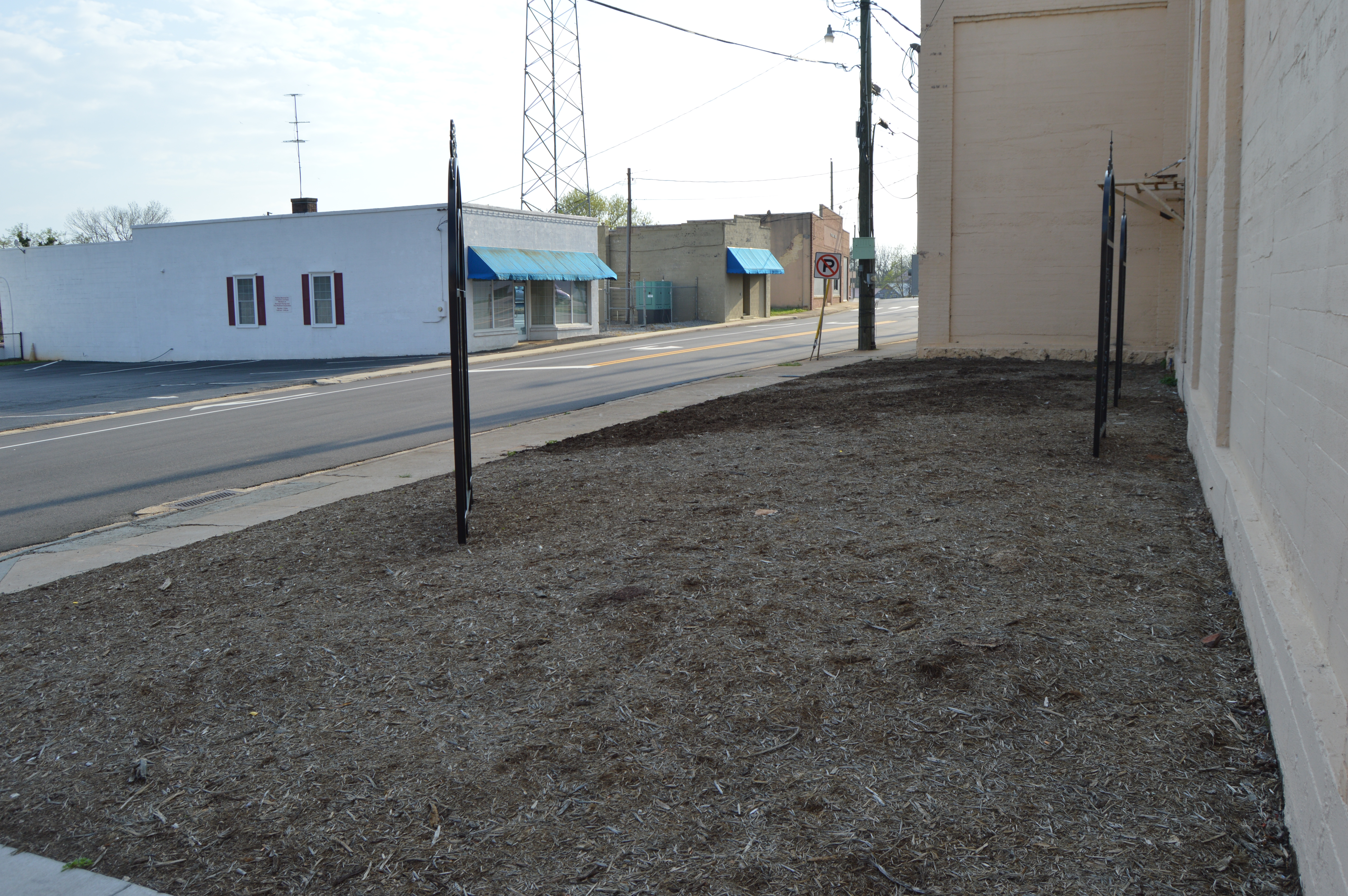
- Site of the diner

- Location within Virginia Location within the United States
- Location: 1 Depot St., Chatham, Virginia
- Coordinates: 36°49′30″N 79°23′55″W
- Area: Less than 1 acre (0.40 ha)
- Built: 1937
- MPS: Diners of Virginia MPS
- NRHP reference No.: 96001450
- VLR No.: 187-0014

Significant dates
- Added to NRHP: December 16, 1996
- Designated VLR: June 19, 1996

Bill's Diner, also known as A Streetcar Named Desire, is a historic converted streetcar diner located at Chatham in Pittsylvania County, Virginia. It was built in the mid-1920s, and used as a streetcar in Reidsville, North Carolina. It was brought to Chatham in 1937, and converted for use as a diner. A rear addition was added in the 1950s.

It was listed on the National Register of Historic Places in 1996.
