= Oak Ridge, Pittsylvania County, Virginia =

Unincorporated community in Pittsylvania County, Virginia

Coordinates: 36°34′53″N 79°32′45″W

Oak Ridge, Pittsylvania County is an unincorporated community in Pittsylvania County, Virginia, United States. It is known as the location of the holiday home of former British prime minister Gordon Brown.
