= United States Hunter/Jumper Association =

Sport governing body

The United States Hunter/Jumper Association, or USHJA, is the governing body for hunt seat and show jumping in the United States. The mission statement of the USHJA is "to unify and represent the hunter and jumper disciplines of equestrian sport through education, recognition and sport programs". The organization is an affiliate of the United States Equestrian Federation (USEF).

The USHJA was formed in 2004 by Bill Moroney. In 2010, they opened their new offices at the Kentucky Horse Park in Lexington, Kentucky.

Major roles include representing all levels of riding in the hunter and jumper disciplines in the United States, and setting rules for the welfare of the horses in the discipline.

The USHJA has 12 zones for different regions of the country, each represented by a zone committee. Zone committees can bring issues brought to them to the USHJA leadership. Members of the committees are appointed by peers via election or by presidential appointment. The USHJA administers several major annual championships, including the USHJA International Hunter Derby Championship, the USHJA Hunter Derby Finals, the USHJA Pony Finals, and the USHJA Emerging Athletes Program. These programs are intended to develop talent across all levels of the hunter and jumper disciplines.
