= Yates Tavern =

Historic commercial building in Virginia, United States

- U.S. National Register of Historic Places
- Virginia Landmarks Register
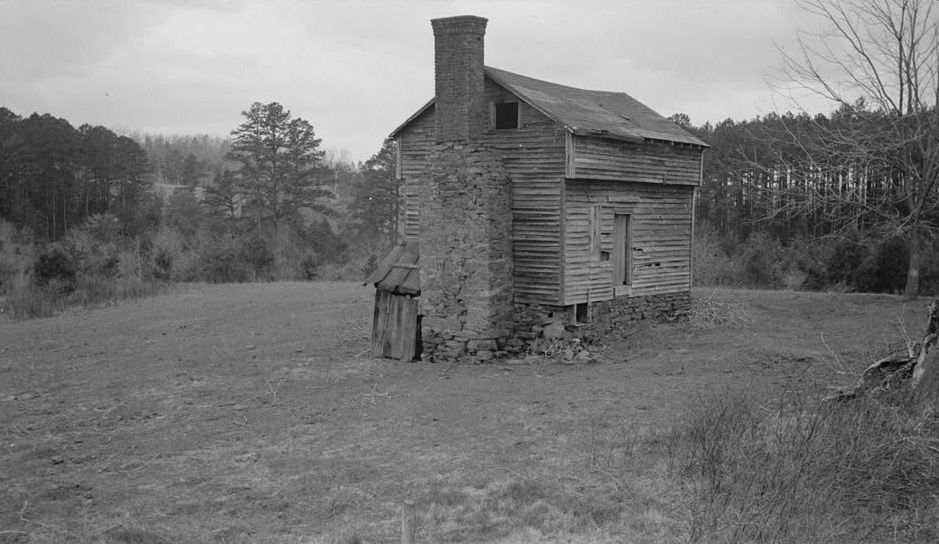
- Yancy Cabin, HABS Photo

- Location within Virginia Location within the United States
- Location: S of Gretna on U.S. 29, near Gretna, Virginia
- Coordinates: 36°56′8″N 79°22′5″W
- Area: 1 acre (0.40 ha)
- Architectural style: Tidewater-Upland House
- NRHP reference No.: 74002143
- VLR No.: 071-0060

Significant dates
- Added to NRHP: December 19, 1974
- Designated VLR: November 19, 1974

Yates Tavern, also known as Yancy Cabin, is a historic tavern located near Gretna, Pittsylvania County, Virginia. The building dates to the late-18th or early-19th century, and is a two-story, frame building sheathed in weatherboard. It measures approximately 18 feet by 24 feet and has eight-inch jetty on each long side at the second-floor level. It is representative of a traditional hall-and-parlor Tidewater house. The building was occupied by a tavern in the early-19th century. It was restored in the 1970s.

It was listed on the National Register of Historic Places in 1974.
