= Pittsylvania County Courthouse =

Historic courthouse in Virginia, US

- U.S. National Register of Historic Places
- U.S. National Historic Landmark
- Virginia Landmarks Register
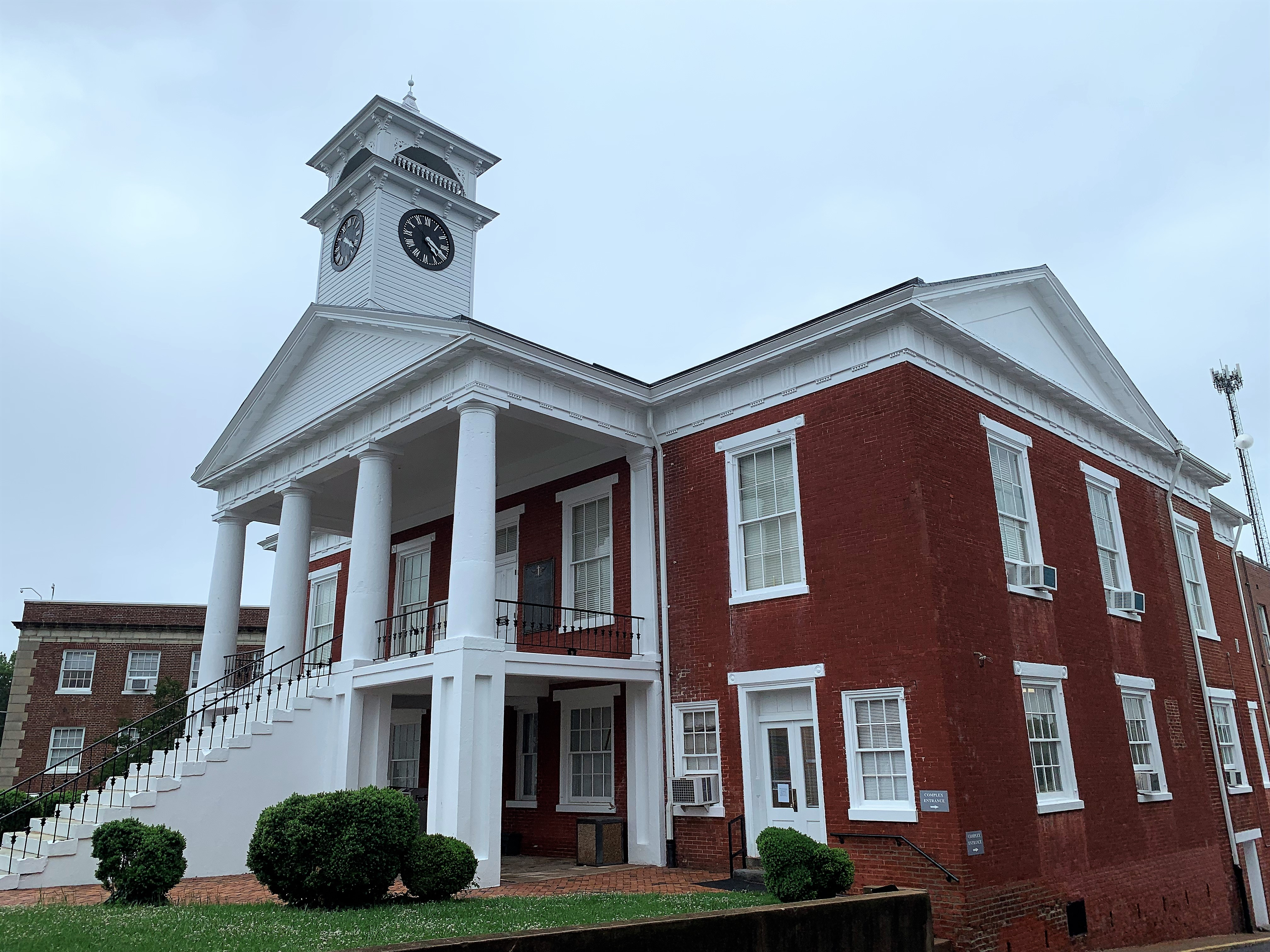
- Pittsylvania Courthouse in 2022

- Location within Virginia Location within the United States
- Interactive map showing the location of Pittsylvania County Courthouse
- Location: US 29, Chatham, Virginia
- Coordinates: 36°49′31″N 79°23′54″W
- Area: 0.5 acres (0.20 ha)
- Built: 1853
- Architect: Shumaker, L.A.
- Architectural style: Colonial Revival, Italianate
- NRHP reference No.: 81000643
- VLR No.: 187-0007

Significant dates
- Added to NRHP: October 29, 1981
- Designated NHL: May 4, 1987
- Designated VLR: June 16, 1981

The Pittsylvania County Courthouse is located at 1 North Main Street in downtown Chatham, Virginia, United States. Built in 1853, this Greek Revival building was Pittsylvania County's third courthouse. It was declared a National Historic Landmark in 1987, because it was the scene of events leading to Ex parte Virginia, a United States Supreme Court case extending the Equal Protection Clause to state actions such as jury selection.

== Description and history ==
The Pittsylvania County Courthouse is located on the east side of US Business Route 29, at the northeast corner of Bank Street. The original portion of the building, built in 1853, faces west, with a modern addition extending to the east along Bank Street. It is a two-story brick building, with a combination of Classical and Italianate styling, designed by L.M. Shumaker. It has a pedimented Greek Revival portico, supported by four fluted Doric columns, and is topped by a tall cupola housing a bell and clock.

Both the county, formed in 1767, and the town of Chatham were named for William Pitt, 1st Earl of Chatham, then the de facto leader of the British government. The present court house replaced a structure built in 1783, one block west of where the old offices of the clerk still stands. The court was removed to this locality from Callands in 1777.

In 1878, Judge J.D. Coles, a district judge, was arrested for violating the Civil Rights Act of 1875 by excluding African Americans from the jury selection process for grand juries and trial juries. Coles filed for release from custody, on the grounds that his rights as an individual and as an officer of the state had been violated. In Ex parte Virginia, the United States Supreme Court ruled against Coles, indicating that the Equal Protection Clause of the Fourteenth Amendment to the United States Constitution provided redress against the operation of state laws and the actions of state officials. It was one of a small number of victories for advocates of civil rights in the period.

== See also ==
- List of National Historic Landmarks in Virginia
- National Register of Historic Places listings in Pittsylvania County, Virginia
