= Gretna, Virginia =

- Town
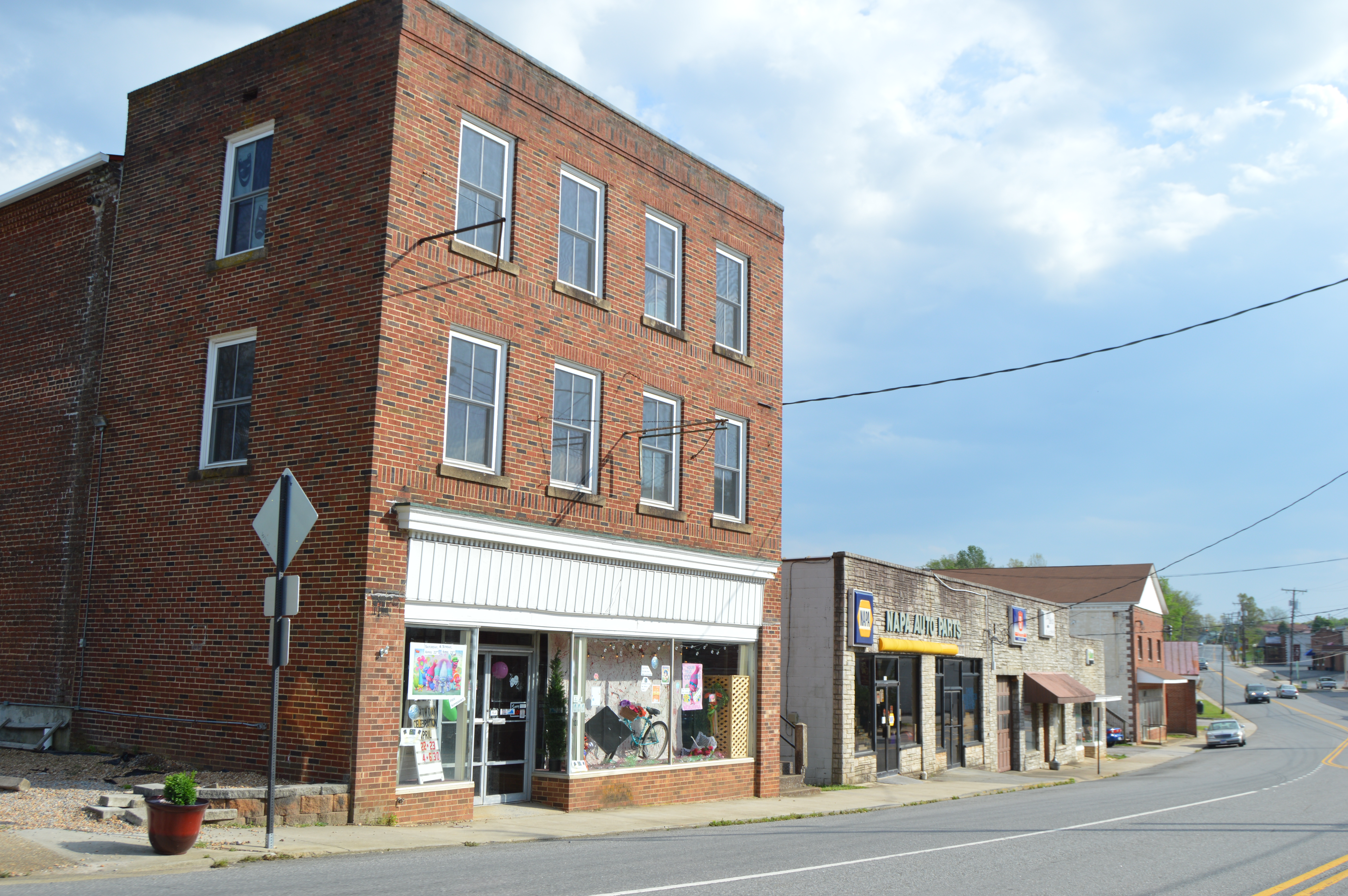
- Main Street downtown

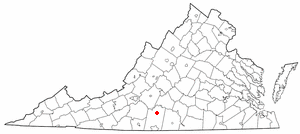
- Location of Gretna, Virginia
- Coordinates: 36°57′11″N 79°21′46″W
- Country: United States
- State: Virginia
- County: Pittsylvania

Government
  - Type: Council-Manager
  - Mayor: R. Keith Motley

Area
  - Total: 1.69 sq mi (4.38 km^{2})
  - Land: 1.67 sq mi (4.32 km^{2})
  - Water: 0.019 sq mi (0.05 km^{2})
- Elevation: 833 ft (254 m)

Population (2020)
  - Total: 1,310
  - Estimate (2019): 1,190
  - Density: 712.9/sq mi (275.25/km^{2})
- Time zone: UTC-5 (Eastern (EST))
  - Summer (DST): UTC-4 (EDT)
- ZIP code: 24557
- Area code: 434
- FIPS code: 51-33232
- GNIS feature ID: 1467538
- Website: www.townofgretna.org

Gretna is a town in Pittsylvania County, Virginia, United States. As of the 2020 census, Gretna had a population of 1,310. It is part of the Danville Micropolitan Statistical Area.

== History ==
The Gretna Commercial Historic District and Yates Tavern are listed on the National Register of Historic Places. Sharswood Plantation, a historic tobacco plantation, is located near Gretna.

The Gretna High football program has produced some prolific teams and claims 5 AA state championships.

== Geography ==
Gretna is located at 36°57′11″N 79°21′46″W (36.953190, -79.362769).

According to the United States Census Bureau, the town has a total area of 1.1 square miles (2.8 km^{2}), of which 1.1 square miles (2.8 km^{2}) is land and 0.04 square miles (0.10 km^{2}) (1.83%) is water.

== Demographics ==
Historical population
Census	Pop.	Note	%±
1910	330		—
1920	470		42.4%
1930	637		35.5%
1940	619		−2.8%
1950	803		29.7%
1960	900		12.1%
1970	986		9.6%
1980	1,255		27.3%
1990	1,339		6.7%
2000	1,257		−6.1%
2010	1,267		0.8%
2020	1,310		3.4%
U.S. Decennial Census

At the 2000 census there were 1,257 people, 569 households, and 326 families living in the town. The population density was 1,172.8 people per square mile (452.8 people/km^{2}). There were 635 housing units at an average density of 592.5 per square mile (228.8/km^{2}). The racial makeup of the town was 60.54% White, 38.90% African American, 0.08% Native American, 0.08% Asian, 0.16% from other races, and 0.24% from two or more races. Hispanic or Latino people of any race were 0.40%.

Of the 569 households 20.7% had children under the age of 18 living with them, 36.6% were married couples living together, 18.3% had a female householder with no husband present, and 42.7% were non-families. 40.4% of households were one person and 22.0% were one person aged 65 or older. The average household size was 2.06 and the average family size was 2.75.

The age distribution was 18.4% under the age of 18, 4.7% from 18 to 24, 21.7% from 25 to 44, 23.9% from 45 to 64, and 31.3% 65 or older. The median age was 50 years. For every 100 females there were 74.1 males. For every 100 females aged 18 and over, there were 67.9 males.

The median household income was $23,710 and the median family income was $33,611. Males had a median income of $28,158 versus $20,598 for females. The per capita income for the town was $14,397. About 14.4% of families and 19.3% of the population were below the poverty line, including 27.7% of those under age 18 and 20.7% of those age 65 or over.
