= Chatham, Virginia =

- Town
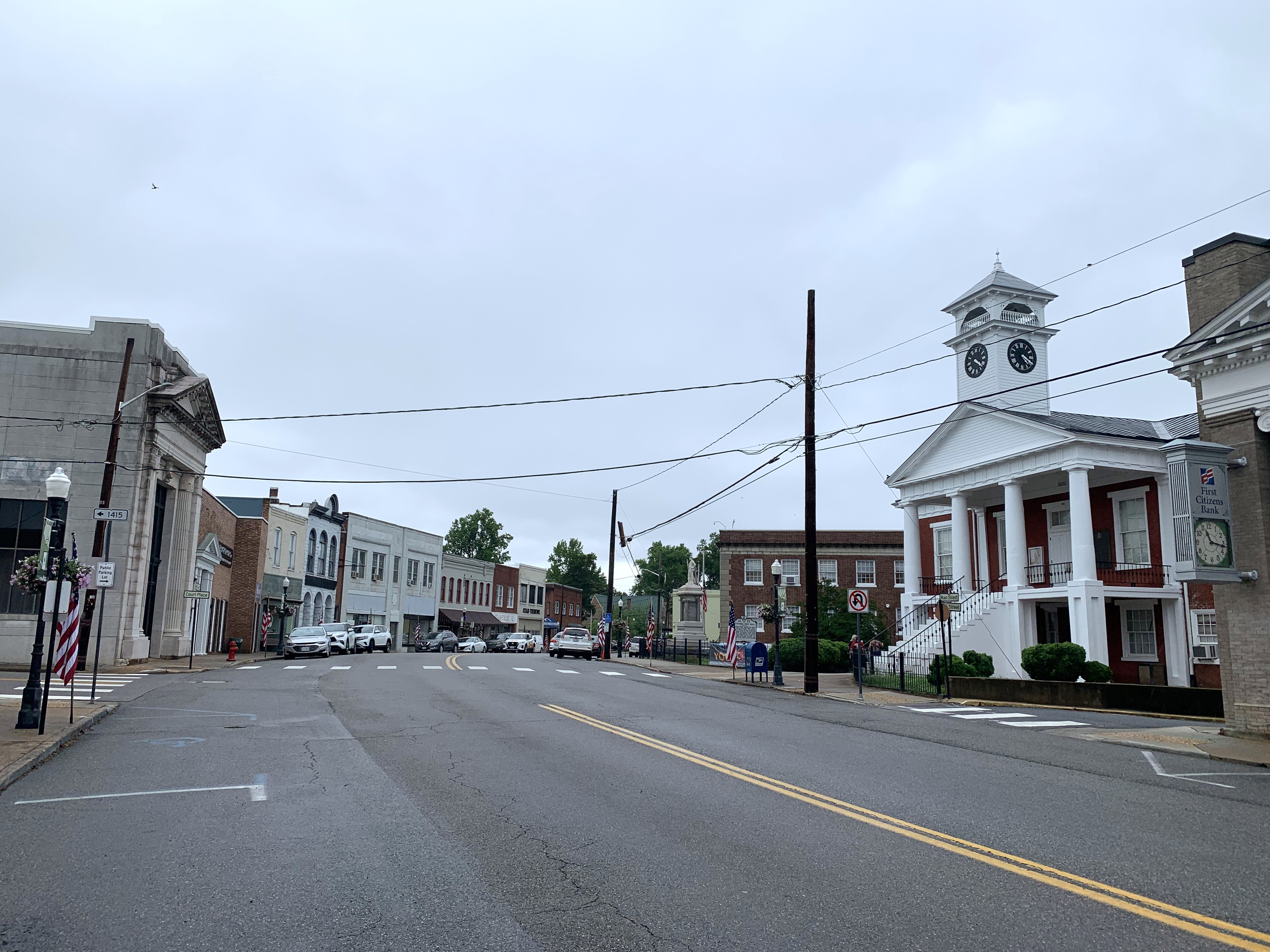
- North Main Street Chatham Virginia, 2022

- Seal

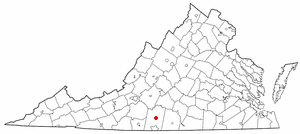
- Location of Chatham, Virginia
- Coordinates: 36°49′32″N 79°23′51″W
- Country: United States
- State: Virginia
- County: Pittsylvania

Government
  - Type: Council-Manager
  - Mayor: Alisa B. Davis
  - Town Council: Janet R. Bishop; William P. Black; Teresa D. Easley; William A. Pace; William M. Riddle; Robert B. Thompson
  - Town Manager: William Wiebking

Area
  - Total: 2.03 sq mi (5.26 km^{2})
  - Land: 2.03 sq mi (5.26 km^{2})
  - Water: 0.0039 sq mi (0.01 km^{2})
- Elevation: 748 ft (228 m)

Population (2020)
  - Total: 1,232
  - Density: 607/sq mi (234.4/km^{2})
- Time zone: UTC−5 (Eastern (EST))
  - Summer (DST): UTC−4 (EDT)
- ZIP code: 24531
- Area code: 434
- FIPS code: 51-15000
- GNIS feature ID: 1498464
- Website: www.chatham-va.gov

Chatham is a town in and county seat of Pittsylvania County, Virginia, United States. Chatham's population was 1,232 at the 2020 census. It is included in the Danville, Virginia metropolitan area. The town was originally called Competition, but the name was changed to Chatham by the Virginia General Assembly on May 1, 1852.

Pruden Hall, Chatham Hall, November 2020

Chatham is home to several high schools: Chatham High School (1964), a Pittsylvania County Public School, Hargrave Military Academy (1909), an all-boys independent military academy, and Chatham Hall (1894), an all-girls independent Episcopal school.

== History ==
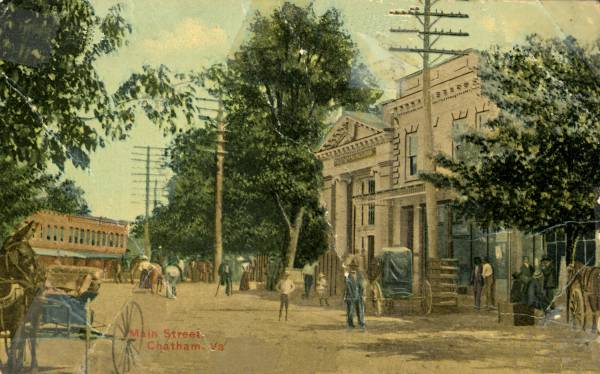
North Main Street, Chatham, circa 1909

It is the home to the oldest continually used building in Pittsylvania County, once an 18th-century tavern, since turned into a house and now occupied by Chatham Hall faculty. Chatham is the county seat for Pittsylvania County and has held that status since 1777. There is a large U.S. Department of Agriculture office to support farmers in the area and a small branch office of the U.S. Forest Service. Virginia has built a new state prison at the site of an old work-release camp; this led to infrastructure upgrades in fire and water services to support the increased population.

Chatham did not see any battle action during the Civil War although it is between Richmond, the capital of the Confederacy, and Danville, which contained Confederate prisons for captured Union soldiers. On Confederate Memorial Day each year, the local chapter of the United Daughters of the Confederacy places flowers at the statue of a Confederate soldier which is prominent in the front of the historic Pittsylvania County Court House. There is a walking tour of this downtown historic district and a brochure for this is available at the Town Hall, or at the Historical Society building next to Town Hall. There are several bed & breakfast establishments located on Main Street in historic Greek Revival homes.

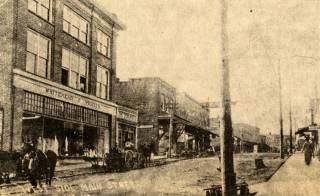
Lower Main Street, Chatham, February 1911

== Geography ==
According to the United States Census Bureau, Chatham has a total area of 2.0 square miles (5.3 km^{2}), all land.

== Demographics ==
Historical population
Census	Pop.	Note	%±
1880	543		—
1890	757		39.4%
1900	918		21.3%
1910	1,113		21.2%
1920	1,171		5.2%
1930	1,143		−2.4%
1940	1,230		7.6%
1950	1,456		18.4%
1960	1,822		25.1%
1970	1,801		−1.2%
1980	1,390		−22.8%
1990	1,354		−2.6%
2000	1,338		−1.2%
2010	1,269		−5.2%
2020	1,232		−2.9%
U.S. Decennial Census

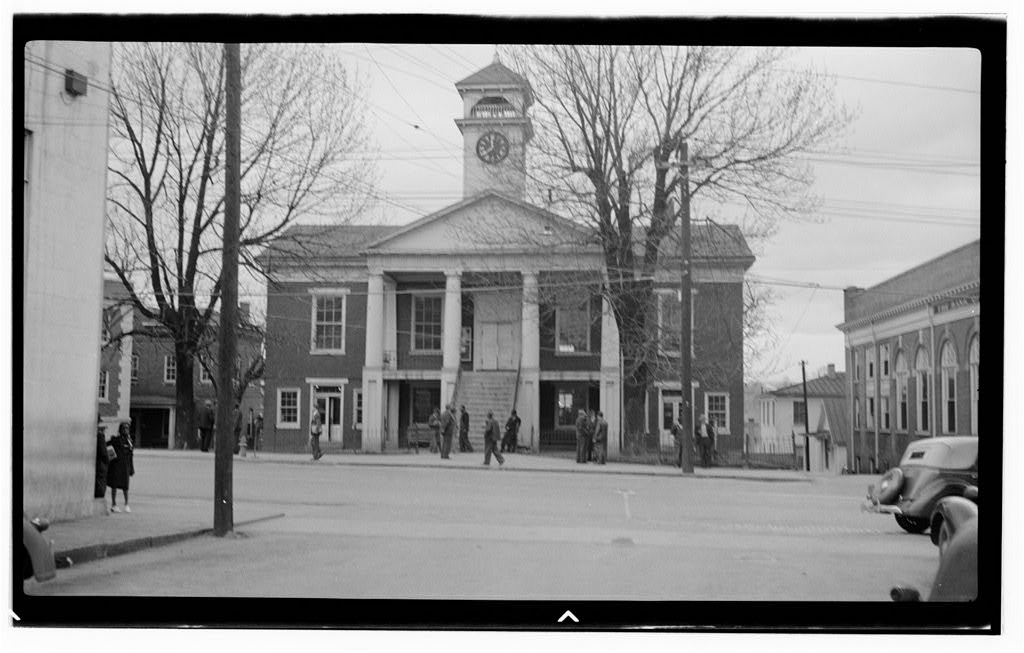
The Pittsylvania County Courthouse is one of eight sites in Chatham listed on the National Register of Historic Places.

As of the census of 2000, 1,338 people, 554 households, and 350 families resided in the town. The population density was 654.6 people per square mile (253.2/km^{2}). The 612 housing units averaged 299.4 per square mile (115.8/km^{2}). The racial makeup of the town was 71.52% White, 26.08% African American, 0.60% Native American, 0.52% from other races, and 1.27% from two or more races. Hispanics or Latinos of any race were 0.60% of the population.

Of the 554 households, 21.7% had children under the age of 18 living with them, 49.8% were married couples living together, 10.6% had a female householder with no husband present, and 36.8% were not families. About 35.6% of all households were made up of individuals, and 17.1% had someone living alone who was 65 years of age or older. The average household size was 2.22 and the average family size was 2.87.

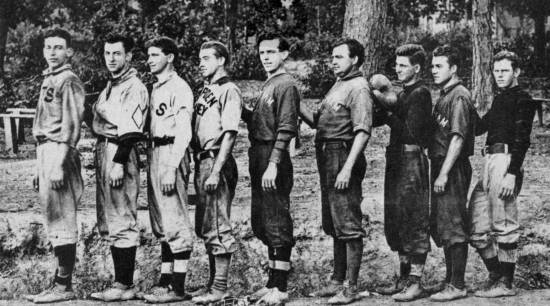
The Countyseat Giants, Chatham's baseball team, 1912

In the town, the population was distributed as 19.6% under the age of 18, 6.2% from 18 to 24, 26.8% from 25 to 44, 26.7% from 45 to 64, and 20.8% who were 65 years of age or older. The median age was 43 years. For every 100 females, there were 100.0 males. For every 100 females age 18 and over, there were 100.7 males.

The median income for a household in the town was $38,938, and for a family was $50,391. Males had a median income of $29,375 versus $23,472 for females. The per capita income for the town was $20,785. About 6.3% of families and 12.3% of the population were below the poverty line, including 16.4% of those under age 18 and 17.0% of those age 65 or over. For people 25 years and over in Chatham:

- High school or higher: 77.4%
- Bachelor's degree or higher: 33.1%
- Graduate or professional degree: 13.2%
- Unemployed: 5.3%
- Mean travel time to work (commute): 20.8 minutes

For people 15 years and over in Chatham:

- Never married: 23.4%
- Now married: 49.6%
- Separated: 3.8%
- Widowed: 9.8%
- Divorced: 13.4%

Nineteen residents are foreign born (1.4%).

== Government ==
The Mayor of Chatham serves a two-year term. The current mayor is Alisa B. Davis. Members of the town council serve four-year terms. The current town council members are Janet R. Bishop, William P. Black, William A. Pace, William M. Riddle, and Robert B. Thompson.

== Climate ==
The climate in this area is characterized by hot, humid summers and generally mild to cool winters. According to the Köppen climate classification system, Chatham has a humid subtropical climate, Cfa on climate maps.

Climate data for Chatham, Virginia (1991–2020 normals, extremes 1922–present)
Month	Jan	Feb	Mar	Apr	May	Jun	Jul	Aug	Sep	Oct	Nov	Dec	Year
Record high °F (°C)	78 (26)	82 (28)	88 (31)	94 (34)	99 (37)	103 (39)	105 (41)	105 (41)	104 (40)	99 (37)	86 (30)	79 (26)	105 (41)
Mean maximum °F (°C)	67.7 (19.8)	70.9 (21.6)	79.6 (26.4)	85.7 (29.8)	88.1 (31.2)	92.0 (33.3)	93.8 (34.3)	92.6 (33.7)	89.2 (31.8)	84.0 (28.9)	75.8 (24.3)	68.7 (20.4)	95.0 (35.0)
Mean daily maximum °F (°C)	47.3 (8.5)	51.0 (10.6)	59.2 (15.1)	69.4 (20.8)	75.9 (24.4)	82.8 (28.2)	86.3 (30.2)	84.9 (29.4)	78.9 (26.1)	69.6 (20.9)	59.4 (15.2)	50.3 (10.2)	67.9 (19.9)
Daily mean °F (°C)	35.7 (2.1)	38.4 (3.6)	45.5 (7.5)	55.0 (12.8)	63.4 (17.4)	71.4 (21.9)	75.5 (24.2)	74.0 (23.3)	67.5 (19.7)	56.2 (13.4)	45.7 (7.6)	38.6 (3.7)	55.6 (13.1)
Mean daily minimum °F (°C)	24.2 (−4.3)	25.7 (−3.5)	31.8 (−0.1)	40.6 (4.8)	50.8 (10.4)	59.9 (15.5)	64.7 (18.2)	63.2 (17.3)	56.0 (13.3)	42.9 (6.1)	31.9 (−0.1)	27.0 (−2.8)	43.2 (6.2)
Mean minimum °F (°C)	6.6 (−14.1)	10.4 (−12.0)	15.5 (−9.2)	25.6 (−3.6)	35.1 (1.7)	46.9 (8.3)	54.5 (12.5)	53.0 (11.7)	41.7 (5.4)	27.8 (−2.3)	18.5 (−7.5)	13.3 (−10.4)	4.3 (−15.4)
Record low °F (°C)	−9 (−23)	−7 (−22)	0 (−18)	17 (−8)	25 (−4)	33 (1)	35 (2)	38 (3)	26 (−3)	19 (−7)	10 (−12)	−3 (−19)	−9 (−23)
Average precipitation inches (mm)	4.18 (106)	2.79 (71)	3.97 (101)	3.85 (98)	4.51 (115)	4.24 (108)	4.22 (107)	4.12 (105)	5.00 (127)	3.46 (88)	3.52 (89)	3.84 (98)	47.70 (1,212)
Average snowfall inches (cm)	1.9 (4.8)	1.6 (4.1)	1.0 (2.5)	0.0 (0.0)	0.0 (0.0)	0.0 (0.0)	0.0 (0.0)	0.0 (0.0)	0.0 (0.0)	0.0 (0.0)	0.0 (0.0)	1.3 (3.3)	5.8 (15)
Average precipitation days (≥ 0.01 in)	10.0	8.3	10.4	10.6	12.2	11.0	11.2	9.8	9.1	8.5	8.5	9.4	119.0
Average snowy days (≥ 0.1 in)	1.1	0.7	0.4	0.0	0.0	0.0	0.0	0.0	0.0	0.0	0.0	0.5	2.7
Source: NOAA

== Notable people ==
Charles Hurt
