= Danville micropolitan area, Virginia =

Micropolitan statistical area in Virginia, United States

Danville, Virginia Area
- Micropolitan Statistical Area
- Danville, VA Micropolitan Statistical Area
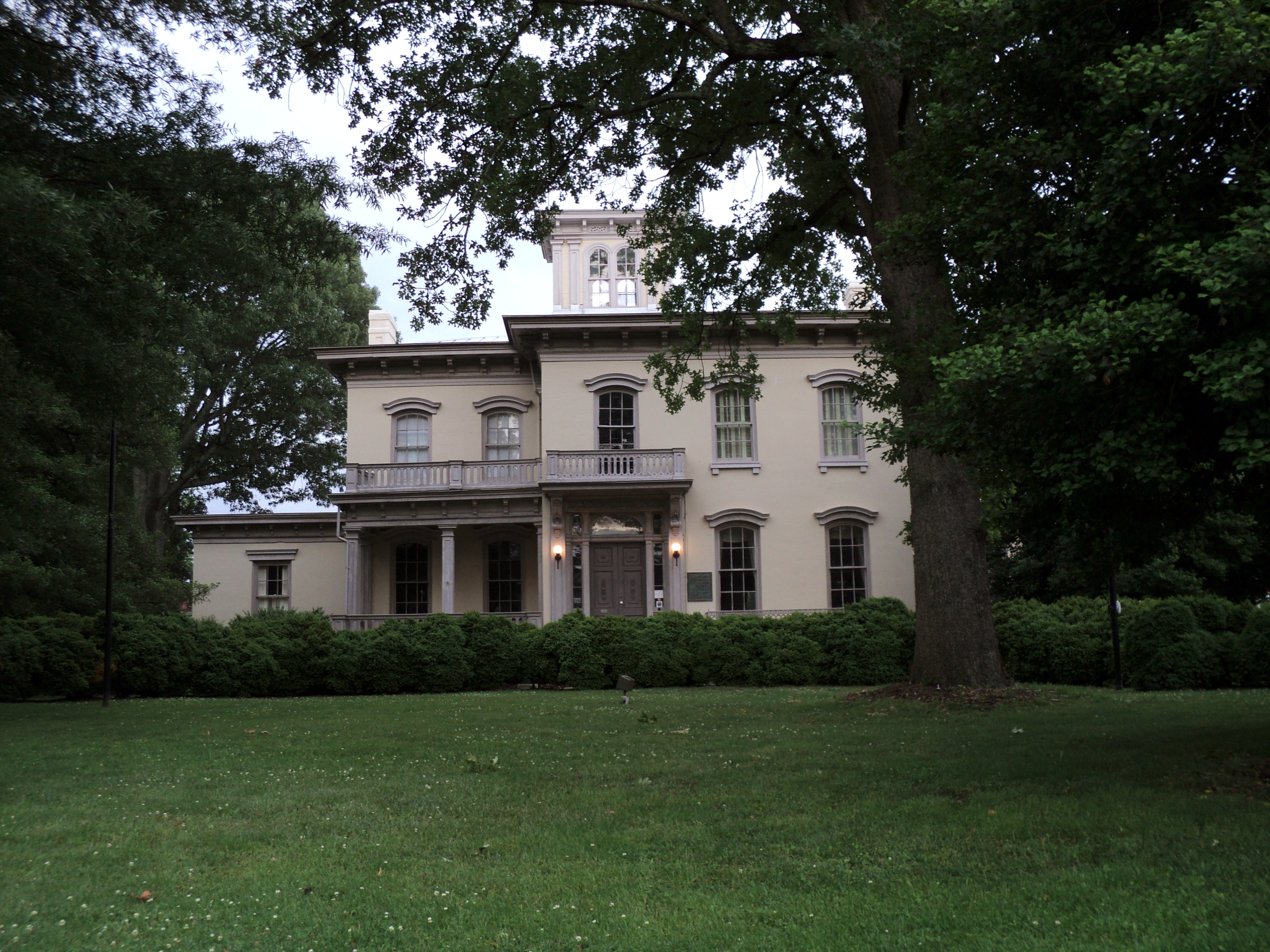
- William T Sutherlin Mansion
Interactive Map of Danville, VA μSA
City of Danville
Danville, VA μSA
- Country: United States
- State: Virginia
- Largest city: Danville
- Time zone: UTC−5 (EST)
  - Summer (DST): UTC−4 (EDT)

The Danville Micropolitan Statistical Area is a Micropolitan Statistical Area (μSA) in Virginia as defined by the United States Office of Management and Budget (OMB). As of the 2010 census, the μSA had a population of 106,561

The Danville μSA was previously classified as a Metropolitan Statistical Area (MSA) until 2013, when it was demoted to a Micropolitan Statistical Area due to core urban area's population falling below 50,000.

== μSA components ==
Note: Since a state constitutional change in 1871, all cities in Virginia are independent cities that are not located in any county. The OMB considers these independent cities to be county-equivalents for the purpose of defining MSAs and μSAs in Virginia.

One county and one independent city are included in the Danville Micropolitan Statistical Area.

- Counties
  - Pittsylvania
- Independent Cities
  - Danville

== Communities ==
=== Incorporated places ===
- Chatham
- Danville (Principal city)
- Gretna
- Hurt

=== Unincorporated places ===
- Blairs
- Chalk Level
- Dry Fork
- Grit
- Mount Airy
- Mt. Hermon
- Pickeral's Crossing
- Pittsville
- Renan
- Ringgold
- Sonans
- Straightstone
- Whittles Depot
- Tightsqueeze

== Demographics ==
As of the census of 2000, there were 110,156 people, 45,291 households, and 31,157 families residing within the MSA. The racial makeup of the MSA was 65.71% White, 32.64% African American, 0.15% Native American, 0.37% Asian, 0.02% Pacific Islander, 0.41% from other races, and 0.70% from two or more races. Hispanic or Latino of any race were 1.24% of the population.

The median income for a household in the μSA was $31,027, and the median income for a family was $38,600. Males had a median income of $29,863 versus $21,383 for females. The per capita income for the μSA was $17,071.

== See also ==
- List of U.S. Micropolitan Statistical Areas in Virginia
- Virginia census statistical areas
