= Samuel M. Inman =

Cotton merchant of Atlanta, Georgia

Samuel Martin Inman
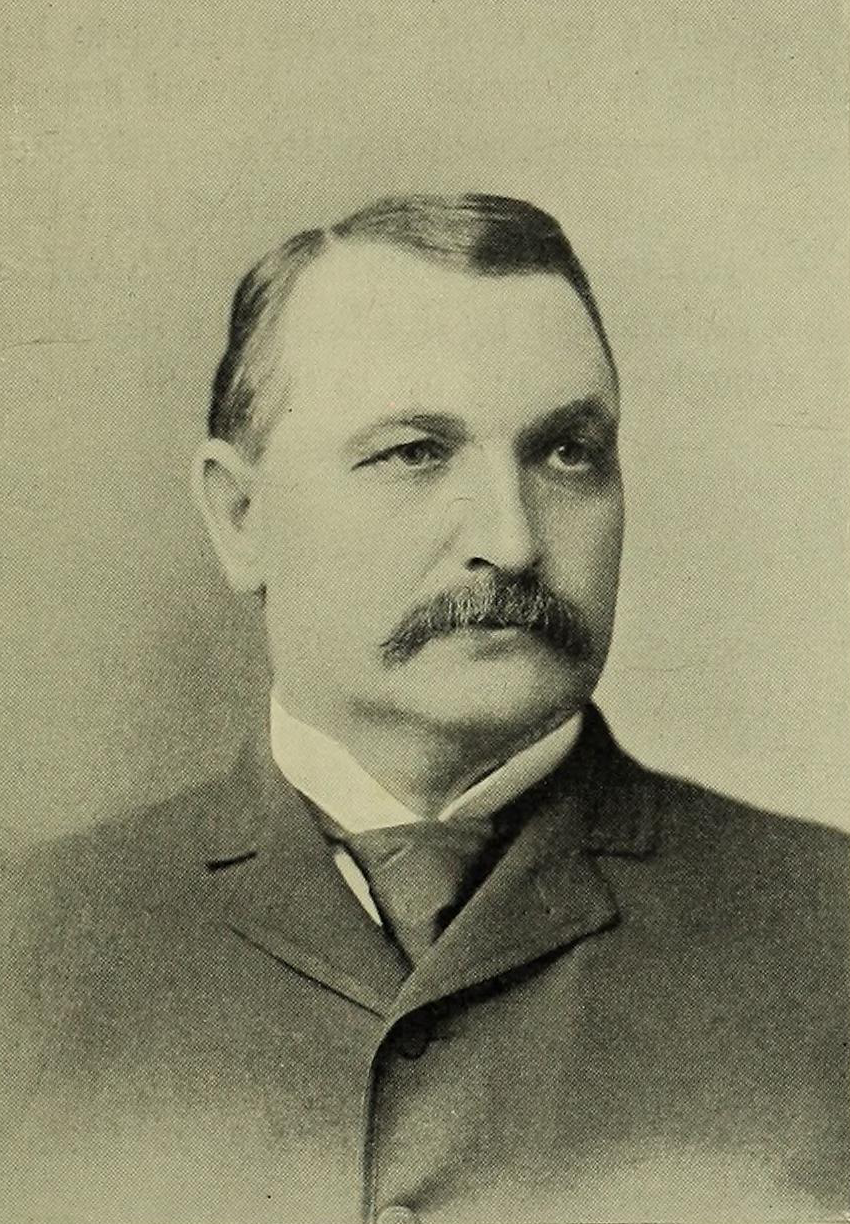
- Born: February 19, 1843; Dandridge, Tennessee
- Died: January 12, 1915 (aged 71)
- Resting place: Oakland Cemetery
- Education: Maryville College; Princeton College
- Notable work: Inman Park
- Relatives: John H. Inman (brother); Hugh T. Inman (brother)

Signature
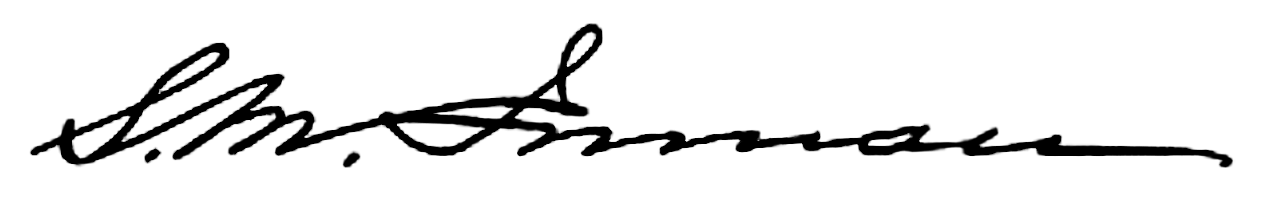

Samuel Martin Inman (February 19, 1843 – January 12, 1915) was a prominent cotton merchant and businessman in Atlanta, Georgia, who is best known for the neighborhood in Atlanta that bears his name. Inman was also commemorated in the name of the Samuel M. Inman Elementary School, and subsequently Middle School in the Virginia-Highland neighborhood from 1929-2020.

== Early life ==
Inman was born February 19, 1843, in Dandridge, Tennessee. He was the son of Shadrach W. Inman and Jane Martin Inman. Inman was educated at Maury Academy and Maryville College before entering Princeton College. At the age of 18, he joined Company K of the Confederate Army's First Tennessee Cavalry during the American Civil War. During the war he served as a lieutenant of his company and was present at the surrender of the army. His diploma from Princeton was awarded to him after the close of the Civil War.

== Atlanta and Inman Park ==
In 1866, Inman moved to Augusta, Georgia, and became a businessman. He joined with Joel Hurt that year to form the East Atlanta Land Company with the purpose of developing Inman Park as a residential suburb of Atlanta. They also formed the Atlanta & Edgewood Street Railroad to provide convenient transportation to the new neighborhood.

He moved permanently to Atlanta in 1867 to establish the S. W. Inman & Son cotton house with his father. The next year he married Jennie Dick of Rome, Georgia, with whom he had two sons and a daughter.

In 1869, they changed the title of the company to S. W. Inman & Co. and by 1889, it was the largest cotton business in the city, with a branch house in Houston, Texas. Some estimated at that time that Inman was worth about $750,000 to $1,000,000, a sum that would have been much larger if not for his charitable donations.

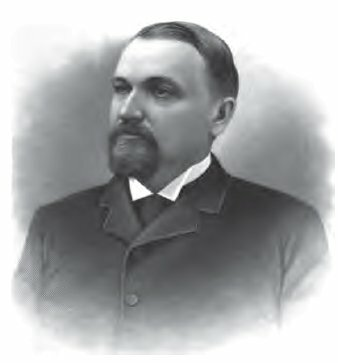
Samuel M. Inman in 1889

== Relatives ==
By 1889, Inman, his two younger brothers, and other male relatives were a very wealthy, enterprising, and influential clan. According to the New Georgia Encyclopedia, "From their interest in cotton they expanded into such related areas as fertilizers, cotton presses, steel hoops to hold compressed cotton, and railroads for the shipping of cotton. In order to influence shipping rates, the Inmans obtained positions on the boards of various railroads and as voting stockholders." The Inmans also invested very profitably in Atlanta real estate, streetcar lines, banking, and insurance, and eventually became involved in Atlanta politics and charitable organizations.

Samuel's brother John H. Inman was the head of the investment company Inman, Swann, & Co. of New York City and president of the Richmond and West Point Terminal Railway and Warehouse Company, a holding company which controlled several railroads that served Atlanta, including the Richmond and Danville Railroad, the East Tennessee and Virginia Railroad, and the Central of Georgia Railroad, totalling 11,000 miles of track throughout the Southeast. John was president of the Richmond and Danville for two years, but was forced to resign on account of charges of financial mismanagement. The other brother, Hugh T. Inman, owned the Kimball House Hotel in Atlanta. Other relatives involved in the family businesses were William H. Inman and Walker Inman, uncles to Samuel and his brothers.

== Georgia School of Technology ==
Inman was instrumental in the early days of the Georgia School of Technology, now known as the Georgia Institute of Technology. First, he secured funding for the school in the amount of $5,000 of his own money and $75,000 plus an annuity of $2,500 from the city. He also helped secure the land for the school and was appointed to the board of commissioners to help oversee some of the construction. Some stated that the school was better equipped than any other technical school at the time.
