= Whitmell P. Tunstall =

American politician

Whitmell Pugh Tunstall
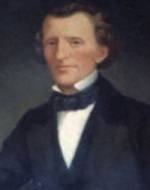
- Whitmell Pugh Tunstall of Chatham, Virginia; Virginia legislator and founder of Richmond and Danville Railroad
- Born: April 15, 1810; Pittsylvania County, Virginia
- Died: February 19, 1854 (aged 43)

Whitmell Pugh Tunstall (April 15, 1810 – February 19, 1854) was a lawyer and state legislator in Chatham, Virginia. He was the long-time advocate most responsible for the creation of the Richmond and Danville Railroad which was completed in 1856.

== Biography ==
Whitmell Pugh Tunstall was born in Pittsylvania County, Virginia. He was educated at Danville Academy and the University of North Carolina at Chapel Hill.

A railroad was a revolutionary idea in the 1830s, which had the confidence of very few people at the time. However, the greatest opposition in the southern portion of Virginia came from those along the Roanoke River who ran the Roanoke Navigation Company and its system of canals. They feared a rival in the transportation business.

A lawyer by profession, Tunstall was admitted to the Virginia State Bar in 1832. He was a member of the Railroad Convention that met at Danville, October 5, 1835, and at Richmond June 11, 1836.

Tunstall served in the Virginia General Assembly in both houses. He was a delegate in the House of Delegates from 1836 to 1841, a senator in the State Senate in 1841 and 1842, and a delegate again from 1845 to 1848.

On April 13, 1838, he introduced a bill to charter the Richmond and Danville Railroad (R&D) with an impassioned speech. No action was taken at that time, and he was to fight tirelessly for creation of the R&D in the Virginia legislature for almost a decade. It was not until 1845 that petitions were again introduced. Finally, after a struggle of nine years, the charter was granted on March 9, 1847. Records reveal Tunstall's dedication to the cause in this statement made to a friend, "Tis the proudest day of my life, and I think I may now say that I have not lived in vain."

Whitmell Pugh Tunstall died on February 19, 1854, of typhoid fever, 2 years before the railroad he had long sought was completed.

== Posthumous honors ==
Pittsylvania County has had several schools named in his honor. Founded in 1878 as a two-room school, in 1918 the Whitmell Farm-Life School became the first rural consolidated school in Pittsylvania County.

In 1964, Whitmell High School and Brosville High School were merged to form Tunstall High School.

Two Virginia Historical Markers were established relating to Whitmell P. Tunstall:

- Whitmell P. Tunstall (L-48) marker is located about one mile south of Chatham in Pittsylvania County. It is on the east side of U.S. Highway 29 at Tightsqueeze just south of the Fairview Road intersection. The marker text reads "One mile east stands Belle Grove, the home of Whitmell Pugh Tunstall (1810-1854). Educated at Danville Academy and the University of North Carolina, Tunstall was admitted to the bar in 1832. He served in the House of Delegates (1836-1841; 1845-1848) and the Senate of Virginia (1841-1842). As a delegate representing Pittsylvania County, he fought for a decade to charter the Richmond and Danville Railroad (part of the present-day Norfolk Southern Railway). He served as the company's first president from 1847 until his death. Tunstall is buried at Belle Grove. Department of Historic Resources, 1993"
- Whitmell School (U-38) marker reads "Founded in 1878 as a two-room school and named for state senator Whitmell P. Tunstall, in 1918 the Whitmell Farm-Life School became the first rural consolidated school in Pittsylvania County. Sarah Archie Swanson Beverly, who between 1916 and 1951 taught there and served as principal, believed that "the country school must be the center of community life." Under her leadership, Whitmell School attained that goal as a model progressive school. In 1920, the National Conference on Rural Education and Country Life was held here, followed in 1923 by the Virginia Rural Life Conference, which Gov. E. Lee Trinkle and U.S. Sen. Carter Glass addressed."

== See also ==
- Richmond and Danville Railroad
- Algernon S. Buford
