= Hugh T. Inman =

American cotton merchant

Hugh Theodore Inman
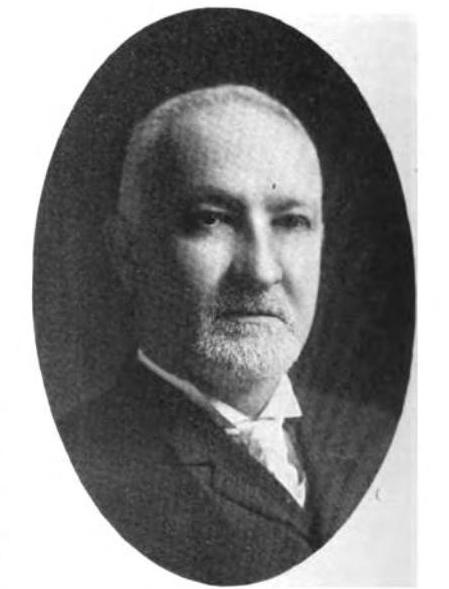
- Born: November 14, 1846; Dandridge, Tennessee, United States
- Died: November 14, 1910 (aged 64)

Hugh Theodore Inman (December 24, 1846 – November 14, 1910) was a member of the prominent Inman Family of Atlanta and was the wealthiest man in Georgia at the time of his death.

He was born in Dandridge, Tennessee, son of Shadrach Inman and grew up there with his brothers Samuel M. Inman and John H. Inman, who were also successful cotton traders and industrialists. He owned an interest in the Inman, Swann, & Co. of New York City. He engaged in the cotton trade in New York City until moving to Savannah, Georgia, and then ultimately Atlanta where he continued in the cotton trade.

He was a founding member and first president of the Exposition Cotton Mills, which was founded in 1882. By 1890, it had 500 employees and had spun fifty million yards of yarn. Along with his brothers he was an investor in the Atlanta Steel and Hoop Company, later known as Atlantic Steel. It was Atlanta's first steel hoop mill. Hugh founded clothing manufacturer Inman, Smith and Company with his son, Edward, in 1896. By 1902, it had 300 employees and was producing 1000 pairs of pants per day. Hugh and son, Edward, provided financial support and were vice-presidents of Atlanta Woolen Mills, which had 450 employees in 1902 and did yearly business amounting to $500,000.

He owned the Kimball House Hotel in downtown Atlanta which he gave as a wedding gift to daughter Annie and son-in-law John W. Grant. His son, Edward Hamilton Inman, owned the Swan House (Atlanta).

At the time of his death, he had amassed an estate exceeding $2,000,000 (approx. US$54 million in 2019 adjusted for inflation) making him the wealthiest man in the state. In August 1910, he went to a sanitarium in New York City suffering from neurasthenia and died there three months later of pneumonia.
