= Algernon Sidney Buford =

American businessman

4th President of the Richmond and Danville Railroad
- In office September 13, 1865 – December 16, 1887
- Preceded by: Lewis E. Harvie
- Succeeded by: Alfred Sully

Member of the Virginia House of Delegates from Richmond City
- In office 1887–1888
- Preceded by: James N. Dunlop, James D. Patton, and Ashton Starke
- Succeeded by: Walter T. Booth, Thomas Byrne, and Levin Joynes

Member of the Virginia House of Delegates from Pittsylvania County
- In office 1861–1865
- Preceded by: E. F. Keen
- Succeeded by: position abolished
- In office 1853–1854 Serving with Andrew J. Whitehead
- Preceded by: George Townes
- Succeeded by: Richard M. Kirby

Personal details
- Born: January 2, 1826 Rowan County, North Carolina
- Died: May 6, 1911 (aged 85) Richmond, Virginia
- Resting place: Hollywood Cemetery, Richmond, Virginia
- Spouse(s): Emily Whitmell Townes (1830–1859) Kate Aubrey Wortham (1843–1875) Mary Cameron Strother (née Ross, 1848–1916)
- Children: 8
- Parent(s): William Buford (1785–1848) and Susan Robertson Shelton (1785–1846)
- Education: University of Virginia (BL)
- Occupation: Railroad executive, lawyer, politician

Algernon Sidney Buford (January 2, 1826 – May 6, 1911) was a Virginia lawyer, businessman, Confederate officer and politician best known for his 22-year presidency of the Richmond and Danville Railroad following the American Civil War, during which he was responsible for growing the line from 140 miles in length to 3,000 miles in length. He also represented Pittsylvania County for one term before the conflict, as well as during the war, and after his retirement represented the City of Richmond for one term.

== Early life and education ==
Born in the part of Rowan County, North Carolina (that became Davie County), although his parents (William Buford and his wife Sarah Robinson Shelton Buford) had grown up in Virginia. William Henry Buford (1785- ) was the youngest son of William and Mary Ragsdale Buford, and married Sarah Robinson Shelton, whose family were prominent patriots in Albemarle and Pittsylvania Counties during the American Revolutionary War (and Sarah Shelton had married Patrick Henry) His father moved the family to Pittsylvania County, Virginia, where Buford was raised and his father operated a school. The family included elder and younger brothers: William Henry Buford (born September 10, 1820) and Charles James Fox Buford (b. May 24, 1830). A.S. Buford himself taught briefly before enrolling at the University of Virginia School of Law in Charlottesville, where he studied from 1846 to 1848, and graduated with a Bachelor of Law degree.

== Early career ==
After graduation and admission to the Virginia bar, Buford moved to Chatham, Virginia, and practiced law in Pittsylvania and neighboring counties as well as the city of Danville (the with a population of approximately 3500). In 1852 Buford bought the Danville Register, which had been aligned with the disintegrating Whig party. Whitmell Pugh Tunstall had founded and was the first president of the Richmond and Danville Railroad. The railroad needed permissions and subsidies from the state legislature. Ironically given Buford's later ownership of that railroad, and his later relation through marriage with Tunstall, Buford campaigned against completion of that railroad, possibly because he may have had a financial interest in the Roanoke Navigation Company, whose river transportation business the railroad would eclipse.

In 1853, Pittsylvania County voters refused to re-elect their part-time representatives in the Virginia House of Delegates, George Townes and William H. Wooding, but instead elected Buford and Andrew J. Whitehead. Buford served on the Committee on Banks, but two years later he abandoned his campaign against the railroad, and voters instead elected Richard M. Kirby and Thomas W. Walton as their delegates.

== American Civil War ==
When the Civil War broke out in the spring of 1861, Buford enlisted in the Confederate States Army on April 23, 1861. He became a sergeant major in the 18th Virginia Infantry, was assigned to the Army of Northern Virginia, and served through the First Battle of Manassas until the fall of 1861, when he was reported sick throughout September and October. However, Buford again ran for a seat in the Virginia House of Delegates from Pittsylvania County, and won, and thereafter instead served in Richmond (winning re-election until war's end). Virginia Governor John Letcher brevetted Buford a lieutenant colonel in the Virginia militia (which led to his postwar honorific, Col. Buford). Buford also watched over sick and injured Confederate troops at "Buford's Home" and forwarded important military supplies to soldiers on the front lines. In 1863, Buford was in charge of the Virginia Depot, on 13th street, south of Cary Street, (Shockoe Slip), in Richmond. His elder brother, William Henry Buford, who may have initially been exempt because of his young children and operation of the plantation, was assigned to the 18th Virginia infantry on October 4, 1864 and captured late in the war at the Battle of Saylor's Creek and taken to Point Lookout Prison. After Appomattox in April 1865, Buford resigned from the legislature and returned to Danville. He applied for a presidential pardon (as did his brother) on July 19, 1865 and received it two days later.

== President of the Richmond and Danville Railroad (1865–1887) ==
Governor Francis Pierpont summoned Buford to Richmond and suggested he become President of the Richmond and Danville Railroad. After his selection on September 13, 1865, Buford moved back to Richmond in early 1866.

Over the next two decades, Buford guided the railroad through its best years. In 1866, the R&D had 154 miles of track and $284,790 in profit. By 1886, it had grown to 2,670 miles of track and $1,767,662 in profit. Adjusting for deflation in the late 19th century, Buford delivered a 1,050% growth in profit over 20 years. In the course of those years, however, the controlling interests in the company became contrary to Buford's established policies of management and he tendered his resignation in late 1886. Over the next two decades, Buford guided the railroad through its best years. In 1866, the R&D had 154 miles of track, $672,714 in earnings, $284,790 in profit, 25 locomotives, and 285 total cars. By 1886, it had grown to 2,670 miles of track, $3,981,355 in earnings, $1,767,662 in profit, 126 locomotives, and 2,551 total cars. Adjusting for deflation in the late 19th century (i.e., converting 1866 USD to 1886 USD), the 1866 earnings decrease to $397,705 and profit decreases to $168,366. When the 1886 numbers are taken as percentages of the 1866 numbers, the growth rates in earnings and profit are given: 1,001% growth in earnings and 1,050% growth in profit.

With the support of Virginia Governor Francis H. Pierpont, on September 13, 1865, Colonel Buford became president of the 140-mile (230 km) Richmond and Danville Railroad (R&D). Damage from the war, including the bridge across the James River between Manchester and Richmond was repaired.

Over the next 20 years, as R&D President, Col. Buford extended the trackage to three thousand miles. The R&D's early acquisitions included the Piedmont Railroad in 1866, and the North Carolina Railroad in 1871.

In 1872, the R&D extended aid to the Atlanta and Richmond Air Line Railway to help it complete its road between Charlotte and Atlanta. The line was to become a key link in the "Piedmont Air Line", a system of railroads across the southeast.

In 1878, the R&D acquired the Charlotte, Columbia and Augusta Railroad.

In 1880, the Richmond and West Point Terminal Railway and Warehouse Company was chartered to acquire railroads which the R&D could not acquire directly due to a limitation in its charter. One of these was the former Richmond and York River Railroad. The Terminal Company quickly purchased over 700 miles (1,100 km) of existing railroads and acquired the franchises for a number of projected lines including the Georgia Pacific Railway and the Rabun Gap Short Line Railway.

In 1881, the R&D leased the Piedmont Air Line system, by then renamed Atlanta and Charlotte Air Line Railway, forming the Richmond and Danville Railroad System.

In 1885, the R&D bought the Lawrenceville-to-Suwanee line in Georgia from the Lawrenceville Branch Railroad. This line was sold to the Atlanta and Charlotte Air Line Railway in 1908, and was abandoned in 1920.

The R&D leased the 61-mile (98 km) North Eastern Railroad (Georgia) in 1886. In 1887, the Terminal Company gained control of the East Tennessee, Virginia and Georgia Railway.

In 1888, the Terminal Company purchased the entire capital stock of the Georgia Company, which held a controlling interest in the Central Railroad and Banking Company. In 1889, the 566-mile (911 km) Georgia Pacific Railway was completed and began operation from Atlanta to Greenville, Mississippi. It had been leased to the R&D in January of that year.

In 1890, the Terminal Company acquired a controlling interest in the Alabama Great Southern Railroad.

By 1890, the R&D System covered 3,300 miles (5,300 km) of track in Virginia, North Carolina, South Carolina, Georgia, Tennessee, Alabama, Mississippi, Arkansas, and Texas. However, the R&D System had become financially unstable during all the growth. In 1892, the R&D and subsidiaries entered receivership.

Reorganized by J.P. Morgan and his New York banking firm of Drexel, Morgan and Company, they emerged in 1894 as the Southern Railway Company, which controlled over 4,000 miles (6,400 km) of line at its inception. In 1980, Southern Railway Company later became part of Norfolk Southern Railway.

== Bon Air community ==
was developed as a resort community of Richmond located on the Richmond and Danville Railroad.

Col. Buford personally (as well as through the Richmond and Danville Railroad) was much involved in the development of Bon Air as a resort community 9 miles (14 km) west of Richmond, beginning around 1877. Originally known as Brown's Summit, later renamed Grand Summit, it was eventually renamed to reflect the French expression for good air. Buford was among the first investors and officers in the Bon Air Land and Improvement Company, alongside other R&D officials, including General Thomas M. Logan, Col. Andrew Talcott, and Talcott's son, Thomas Mann Randolph Talcott. Among Bon Air's residents of the period was druggist Polk Miller, who founded Sergeant's Pet Care Products and became a notable musician.

== After the R&D (1887–1911) ==
After his retirement from the presidency of the Richmond and Danville, Buford remained active in Richmond society. He also successfully ran for one of Richmond City's four legislative seats, and won, as Richmond voters refused to re-elect any of their four previous delegates and instead elected Buford alond with Henry L. Carter, John A. Curtis and Lyon Gardiner Tyler. Buford was also one of the directors of the Merchants National Bank of Richmond, and served as president of the Virginia Agricultural and Mechanical Society for four years. In 1893, he ran for governor of Virginia but was defeated by Charles T. O'Ferrall.

== Personal life ==
Buford married three times. His first marriage was to Emily Whitmell Townes (1830–1859) of Pittsylvania in December 1854, with whom he had three daughters: Elizabeth T. "Lizzie" (1856–1859), Susan A. (1857–1859), and Emily Townes (1859–1938), married Col. Clement E. Manly (1853–1928) of North Carolina. Emily died in November 1859 and Buford remarried to Kate Aubrey Wortham (1843–1875) of Richmond in December 1869. They had two daughters: Catherine "Kate" Thomas (1871–1963), married Walter T. L. Livingston (1871–1930); and Elizabeth "Lizzie" Gilmer (1873–1880). After Kate's death in 1875, Buford remarried for the third and final time to Mary Cameron Strother (née Ross, 1848–1916), the widow of Robert Q. Strother (1844–1873), in May 1879. They had three children: Algernon Sidney Jr. (1880–1951), married Elisabeth Lanier Dunn (1884–1980); Mary Ross (1883–1962), married Frederick E. Nolting (1872–1955); and William Erskine (1887–1954), married Sarah Sergeant Oppenheimer (1894–1972).

== Death and legacy ==
In 1911, Algernon S. Buford died at his home in Richmond and was buried at Hollywood Cemetery. On the night of May 6, 1911, Colonel Buford died at his residence at 20 West Franklin Street in Richmond. His funeral was held on May 8 at Broad Street Methodist Church, which he had attended for many years. He was buried in Hollywood Cemetery.

Buford is memorialized by the naming of the thoroughfare Buford Road in Bon Air, Virginia.

Buford, Georgia, a town (and later a city) on a portion for the Richmond and Danville Railroad system was named for him.
