= Sonan =

Sonan may refer to:

- Jinhaku Sonan (楚南 仁博 1892–1984) a Japanese entomologist
  - Sonan's salamander, Hynobius sonani, a salamander in the family Hynobiidae, endemic to Taiwan, where it occurs in the Central Mountain Range
- "Sōnan" (遭難 "Distress"), the second single by Japanese rock band Tokyo Jihen

== See also ==
- Sonans, Virginia, an unincorporated community in Pittsylvania County
