= Dandridge, Tennessee =

County seat of Jefferson County, Tennessee, United States

Dandridge
- Town
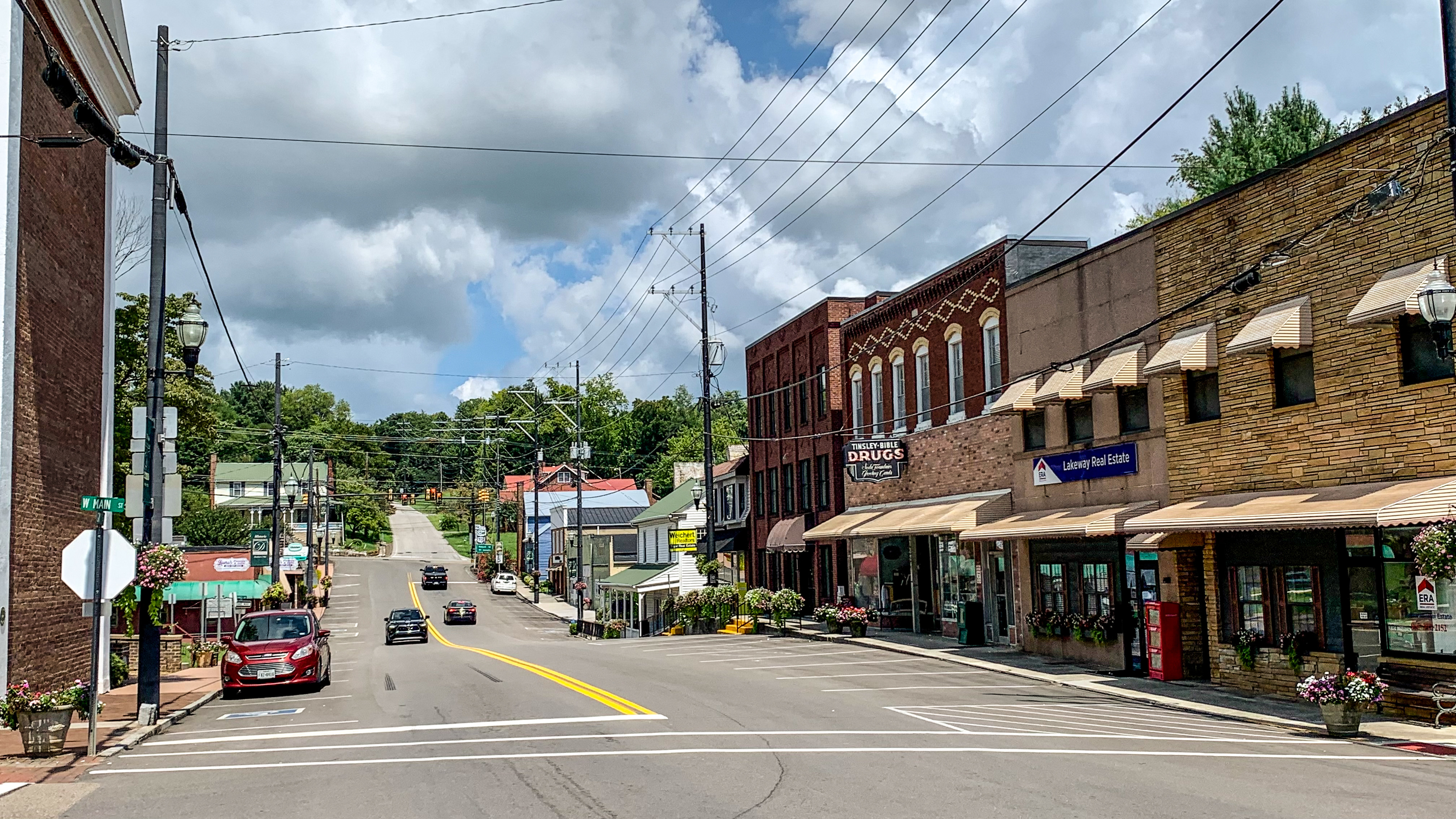
- Storefronts along Gay Street in downtown Dandridge

- Flag Logo
- Motto: “We Saved a Place For You.”
- Location of Dandridge in Jefferson County, Tennessee
- Coordinates: 36°1′43″N 83°25′26″W
- Country: United States
- State: Tennessee
- County: Jefferson
- Founded: 1783
- Incorporated: 1799
- Named for: Martha Dandridge Washington

Government
  - Type: Mayor-council
  - Mayor: George Gantte
  - Vice Mayor: Todd Kesterson
  - Town Council: Aldermen: Todd Kesterson; Mike Chambers; Jeffrey Depew; Jessica Elder; Colton Runyon; Marianne Reese

Area
  - Total: 6.55 sq mi (16.96 km^{2})
  - Land: 6.02 sq mi (15.59 km^{2})
  - Water: 0.53 sq mi (1.37 km^{2})
- Elevation: 997 ft (304 m)

Population (2020)
  - Total: 3,344
  - Density: 555.5/sq mi (214.48/km^{2})
- Time zone: UTC-5 (Eastern (EST))
  - Summer (DST): UTC-4 (EDT)
- ZIP code: 37725
- Area code: 865
- FIPS code: 47-19380
- GNIS feature ID: 1282016
- Website: www.dandridgetn.gov

Dandridge is a town in and the county seat of Jefferson County, Tennessee. It had a population of 3,341 at the 2020 census. The town is part of the Morristown, Tennessee Metropolitan Statistical Area, which consists of Jefferson and Hamblen counties.

It is considered a suburb of Knoxville based on its proximity to the city, and the connection between the two via Interstate 40.

Dandridge bills itself as the "second oldest town in Tennessee" (behind only Jonesborough in Washington County). Most of the downtown area of Dandridge sits below the high level water mark of Douglas Lake and is protected by a levee made out of stone.

== History ==
In the 16th century, a substantial Native American chiefdom known as Chiaha was located on Zimmerman's Island, just southwest of Dandridge along the French Broad River. Spanish explorer Hernando de Soto spent several weeks at Chiaha in 1540, and Juan Pardo built a small fort near the chiefdom's main village in 1567. Both expeditions were en route to the chiefdom of Coosa in what is now Georgia. Zimmerman's Island is now submerged by Douglas Lake.

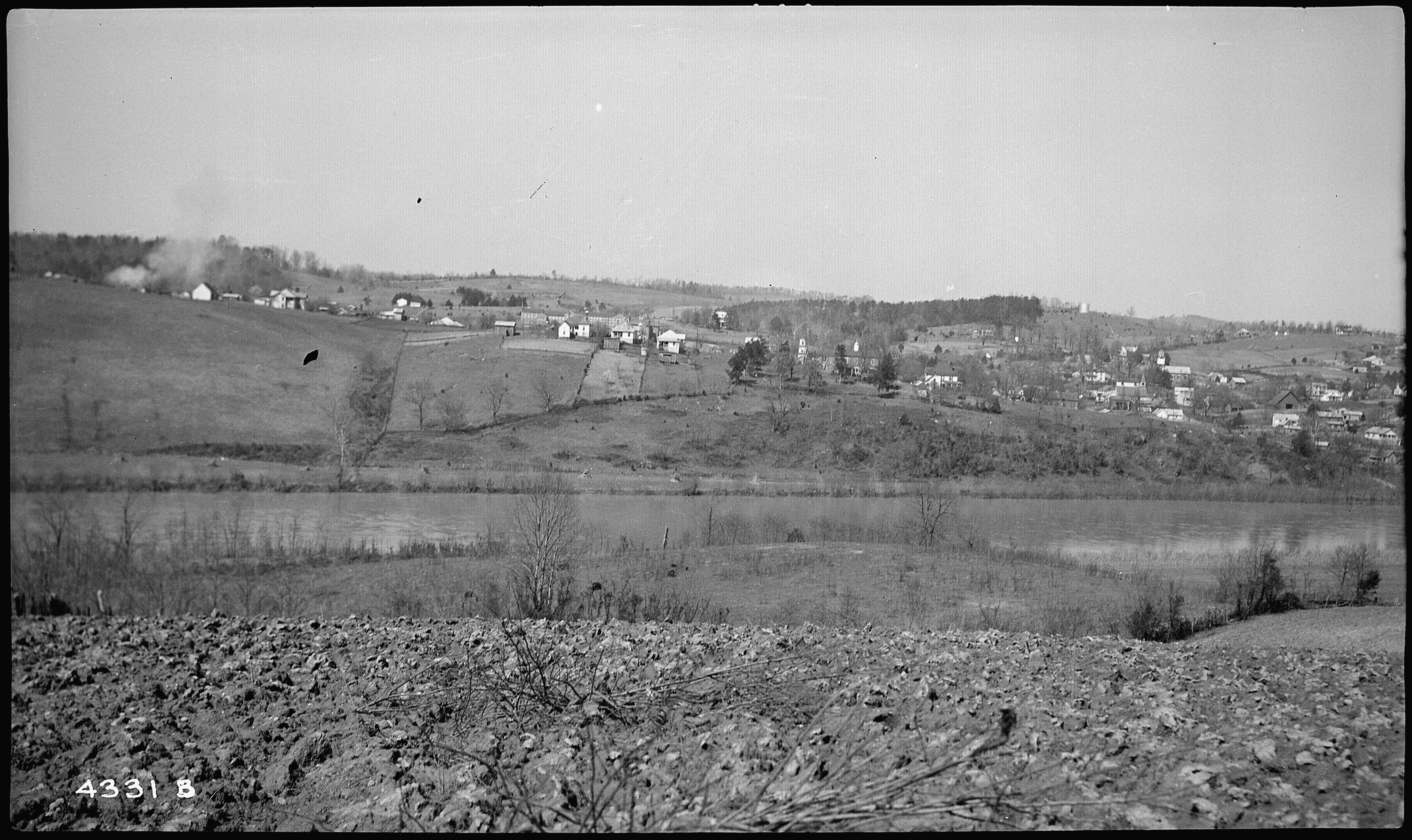
Dandridge in 1938

The first Euro-American settlers arrived in Dandridge in 1783. In 1793, the town was officially named the county seat of Jefferson County, which had been created the previous year. The town was named for Martha Dandridge Washington, the wife of the first president of the United States.

On December 24, 1863, at the height of the Civil War, a skirmish occurred at Dandridge as Confederate General James Longstreet and Union General Ambrose Burnside struggled for control of Knoxville. As Longstreet's army retreated to Morristown, a detachment of his army intercepted and routed a pursuing Union brigade just north of Dandridge. The Union troops were forced to fall back to New Market.

The construction of Douglas Dam on the French Broad River in 1942 proposed to flood almost all of downtown Dandridge, which was situated below the proposed reservoir's high-water mark. Residents of the town successfully petitioned then First Lady Eleanor Roosevelt, pointing out that Dandridge was the only town in the United States named for the wife of George Washington. The Tennessee Valley Authority constructed a levee between downtown Dandridge and the reservoir. The levee rises almost immediately behind the Town Hall, and runs roughly parallel to Main Street.

In 1975, Interstate 40 would be completed north of Dandridge, prompting town officials to annex the corridor of I-40 at exit 417 where it shares an interchange with SR 92.

In 2015, the Town of Dandridge began efforts to revitalize its downtown area and its waterfront. These plans include a public dock across the SR 92 bridge in Dandridge on TWRA owned land, improved bicycle and pedestrian access, a floating amphitheater, civic space, a swimming area, a farmer's market pavilion, commercial development space, and a hotel-conference center. The project is expected to be complete in the early to mid 2020s.

== Geography ==
Dandridge is located south of the center of Jefferson County at 36°1′43″N 83°25′26″W (36.028493, -83.424010). The town is situated along the northern bank of the Douglas Lake impoundment of the French Broad River, approximately 45 miles (72 km) upstream by river from its confluence with the Holston and Tennessee rivers at Knoxville, and approximately 12 miles (19 km) upstream from Douglas Dam.

By highway, Dandridge is 9 miles (14 km) south of Jefferson City, 18 miles (29 km) southwest of Morristown, 16 miles (26 km) northwest of Newport, 18 miles northeast of Sevierville, and 31 miles (50 km) east of Knoxville.

According to the United States Census Bureau, Dandridge has a total area of 6.4 square miles (16.6 km^{2}), of which 5.9 square miles (15.3 km^{2}) are land and 0.54 square miles (1.4 km^{2}), or 8.21%, are water.

=== Major highways ===
- I-40
- I-81
- US 25W
- US 70
- SR 66
- SR 92
- SR 113
- SR 139

== Demographics ==
Historical population
Census	Pop.	Note	%±
1880	431		—
1910	447		—
1920	439		−1.8%
1930	446		1.6%
1940	488		9.4%
1950	690		41.4%
1960	829		20.1%
1970	1,270		53.2%
1980	1,383		8.9%
1990	1,540		11.4%
2000	2,078		34.9%
2010	2,812		35.3%
2020	3,344		18.9%
2024 (est.)	3,841	▲	14.9%

=== 2020 census ===
Dandridge racial composition
Race	Number	Percentage
White (non-Hispanic)	2,958	88.46%
Black or African American (non-Hispanic)	106	3.17%
Native American	15	0.45%
Asian	26	0.78%
Pacific Islander	3	0.09%
Other/Mixed	105	3.14%
Hispanic or Latino	131	3.92%

As of the 2020 census, Dandridge had a population of 3,344. The median age was 43.2 years. 20.3% of residents were under the age of 18 and 22.0% were 65 years of age or older. For every 100 females, there were 97.4 males, and for every 100 females age 18 and over, there were 92.4 males age 18 and over.

0.0% of residents lived in urban areas, while 100.0% lived in rural areas.

There were 1,202 households in Dandridge, including 796 families. Of those households, 31.3% had children under the age of 18 living in them. Of all households, 52.2% were married-couple households, 14.3% were households with a male householder and no spouse or partner present, and 27.9% were households with a female householder and no spouse or partner present. About 25.4% of all households were made up of individuals, and 12.6% had someone living alone who was 65 years of age or older.

There were 1,339 housing units, of which 10.2% were vacant. The homeowner vacancy rate was 1.8% and the rental vacancy rate was 8.0%.

=== 2010 census ===
As of the census of 2010, there were 2,721 people, 833 households, and 516 families residing in the town. The population density was 509 inhabitants per square mile (197/km^{2}). There were 833 housing units at an average density of 156.0 per square mile (60.2/km^{2}). The racial makeup of the town was 92.44% White, 6.54% African American, 0.24% Native American, 0.05% Asian, 0.19% from other races, and 0.53% from two or more races. Hispanic or Latino of any race were 0.96% of the population.

There were 749 households, out of which 27.9% had children under the age of 18 living with them, 54.7% were married couples living together, 11.5% had a female householder with no husband present, and 31.0% were non-families. 28.3% of all households were made up of individuals, and 10.8% had someone living alone who was 65 years of age or older. The average household size was 2.30 and the average family size was 2.81.

In the town, the population was spread out, with 24.0% under the age of 18, 7.8% from 18 to 24, 26.3% from 25 to 44, 21.8% from 45 to 64, and 20.2% who were 65 years of age or older. The median age was 39 years. For every 100 females, there were 100.2 males. For every 100 females age 18 and over, there were 87.4 males.

The median income for a household in the town was $34,167, and the median income for a family was $40,357. Males had a median income of $31,667 versus $21,176 for females. The per capita income for the town was $19,753. About 9.4% of families and 13.1% of the population were below the poverty line, including 18.4% of those under age 18 and 10.8% of those age 65 or over.

== Notable people ==
- John Caspar Branner (1850–1922) — geologist
- Harry Masayoshi Fujiwara (1935–2016) — wrestled professionally as Mr. Fuji
- Norman C. Gaddis (1923–2024) — United States Air Force general and POW
- Hugh T. Inman (1846–1910) — entrepreneur and cotton merchant
- John H. Inman (1844–1896) — entrepreneur
- Samuel M. Inman (1843–1915) — entrepreneur and cotton merchant
- Glenn Thomas Jacobs (b. 1967) — mayor of Knox County, actor, and insurer; wrestled professionally as Kane
- Peter Malnati (b. 1987) — pro golfer
- John Rankin (1795–1886) — abolitionist
