= Bobby Dodd Stadium =

American football stadium on the Georgia Tech campus in Atlanta, GA

- The Flats
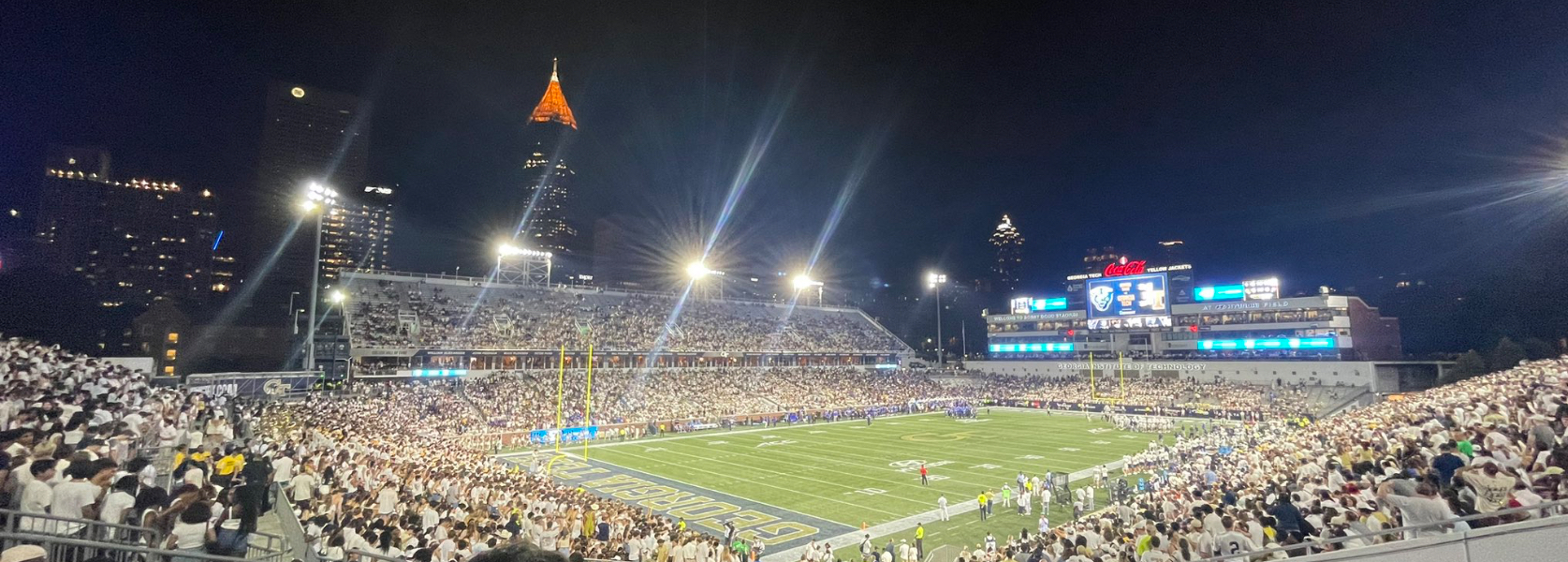
- A view of Bobby Dodd Stadium during a night game in 2024.
- Interactive map of Bobby Dodd Stadium
- Former names: Grant Field (1913–1988); Bobby Dodd Stadium at Historic Grant Field (1988–2023)
- Address: 155 North Avenue NW; Atlanta, Georgia; United States
- Coordinates: 33°46′21″N 84°23′34″W
- Owner: Georgia Institute of Technology
- Operator: Georgia Institute of Technology
- Capacity: 52,113 (2026–present) Former capacity: List: 51,913 (2024–2025); 55,000 (2003–2023); 43,719 (2002); 41,000 (2001); 46,000 (1986–2000); 58,121 (1967–1985); 53,300 (1962–1966); 44,000 (1947–1961); 30,000 (1925–1946); 25,000 (1919–1924); 7,000 (1913–1918)
- Surface: Bermuda grass (1913–70, 1995–2019); Astroturf (1971–94); Shaw Legion NXT synthetic turf (2020–present)
- Record attendance: 60,316 (1973 vs. Georgia)

Construction
- Groundbreaking: April 1913
- Opened: September 27, 1913
- Renovated: 1985, 2003, 2020
- Expanded: 1924, 1925, 1947, 1958, 1962, 1967, 2003
- Cost: $35,000 (original west stands) ($1.14 million in 2025 dollars) $75 million (Latest expansion)
- Architects: Charles Wellford Leavitt; HOK Sport (renovation)

Tenants
- College football: Georgia Tech Yellow Jackets (NCAA) (1913–present); Peach Bowl (NCAA) (1968–1970); College baseball: Georgia Tech Yellow Jackets (NCAA) (1914–1929); Pro football: Atlanta Falcons (NFL) (October 5, 1969); Soccer: Atlanta Apollos (NASL) (1973); Atlanta Beat (WUSA) (2001); Atlanta United FC (MLS) (2017)

Website
- ramblinwreck.com/bobby-dodd-stadium

Bobby Dodd Stadium, commonly known as Bobby Dodd or The Flats is the football stadium located at the corner of North Avenue at Techwood Drive on the campus of the Georgia Institute of Technology in Atlanta. It has been home to the Georgia Tech Yellow Jackets football team, often referred to as the "Ramblin' Wreck", in rudimentary form since 1905 and as a complete stadium since 1913. The team participates in the NCAA Division I Football Bowl Subdivision as a member of the Atlantic Coast Conference. It is the oldest stadium in the FBS and has been the site of more home wins than any other FBS stadium.

== Location ==
The stadium is located on the east side of the Georgia Tech campus, across from freshman housing facilities and just a short walk from the campus library and fraternity/sorority row. The facility is in Midtown Atlanta, just off Interstate 75/85 (the "Downtown Connector"), across from the famed Varsity restaurant.

North Avenue station, located on the Red and Gold lines of the MARTA subway system, is a short walk to the east of Bobby Dodd Stadium along North Avenue.

== History ==
Bobby Dodd Stadium, formerly known as Historic Grant Field, is the oldest continuously used on-campus site for college football in the Southern United States, and the oldest in the FBS.

Football has been played at the current site since 1905. In 1913, permanent grandstands were built for the first time, mostly by Tech students. It was originally named for Hugh Inman Grant, son of John W. Grant, a well-known Atlanta merchant and original benefactor of the stadium. From 1913 to 1919, the stadium grew from a capacity of 7,000 to one of 25,000.

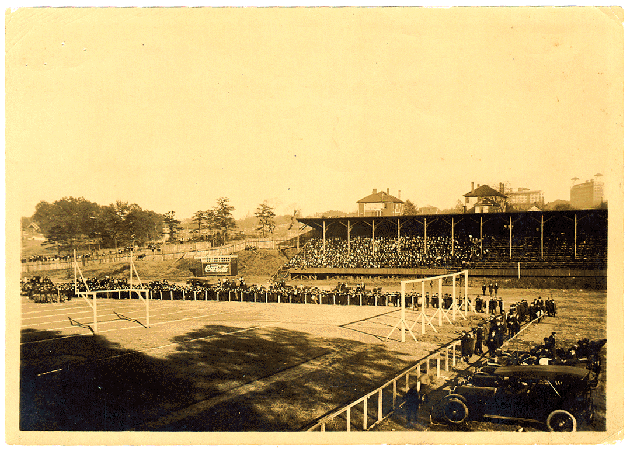
Grant Field and the east stands (note houses in background, along Techwood Drive, also visible in other early photos), c. 1912–13

The stadium bears little, if any, resemblance to its original form, having been expanded many times. The original facility, roughly corresponding to the lower level of the current stadium's west grandstands, seated 5,600. The terrain in the area slopes upward from north to south, a slope very noticeable in the background of early photos, before the slopes were covered by the large stands built over them. Due to that natural grade, much of the field itself is below street level. The houses observable in the background of early photos were replaced by dormitory buildings in the 1930s. In 1935, President Franklin D. Roosevelt gave a speech at the stadium.

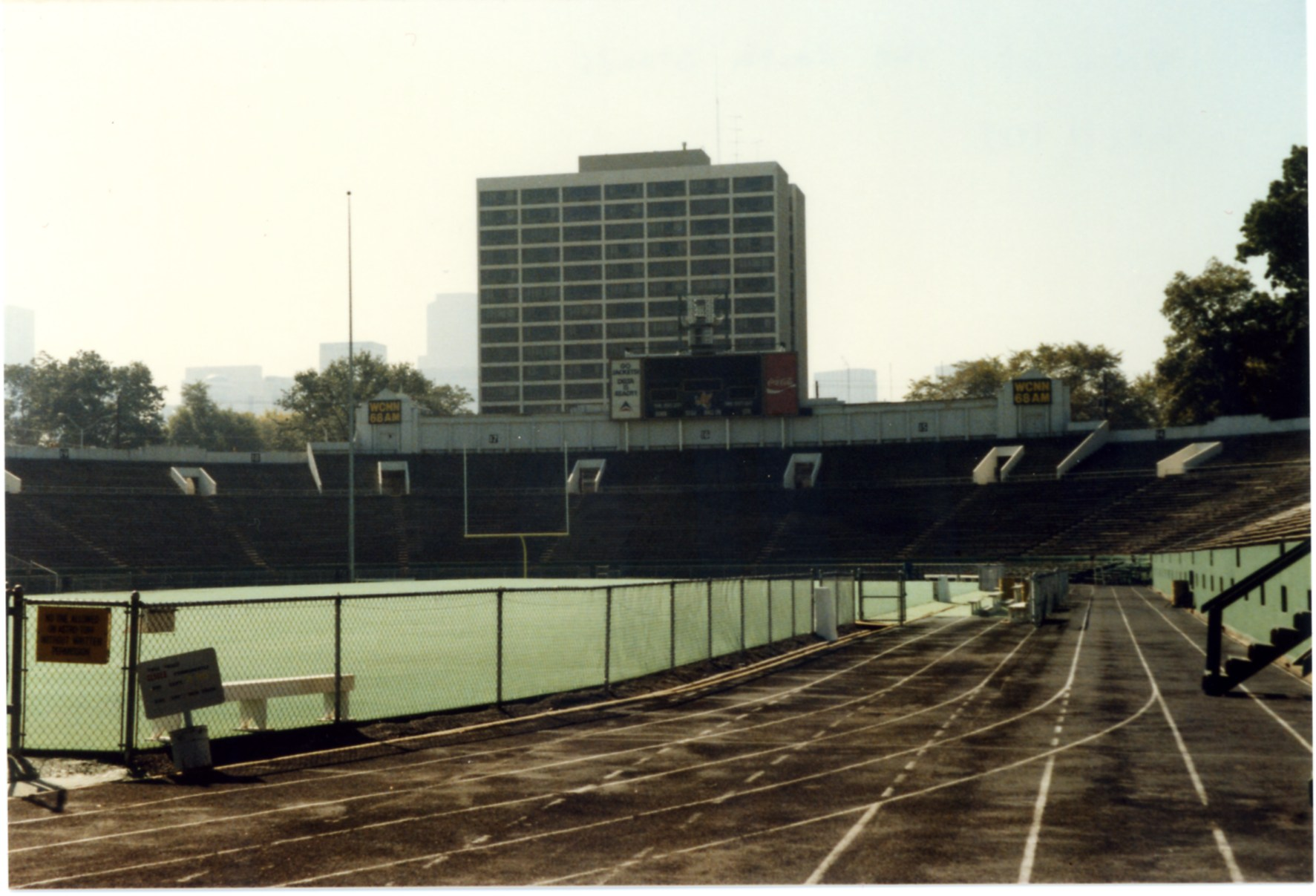
Grant Field and the south stands in 1985, shortly before their removal

By 1925, the east and south stands were completed, making the stadium a 30,000-seat horseshoe with an open north end. The west stands were rebuilt and a large press box was added in 1947, bringing capacity up to 44,000. The original all-steel 4,105-seat North stands were erected in 1958, and in 1962 and 1968 the upper decks were added to the East and West sides, respectively, bringing capacity to its all-time high of 58,121. Following this, Grant Field hosted the inaugural Peach Bowl in 1968, and would serve as its venue from 1968 to 1970. Grant Field was used as a site for an Atlanta Falcons game on October 5, 1969, when it was sharing Fulton County Stadium with the Atlanta Braves of Major League Baseball and there were scheduling conflicts for the 1969 NLCS. Grant Field also served as the home field for the Atlanta Apollos of the North American Soccer League for their 1973 season. In August 1984, the stadium hosted the annual Drum Corps International World Championships. In 1985 the South stands were razed to make room for the William C. Wardlaw Center, a modern field house and athletic office facility to replace the facilities in the old Heisman Gym, which was located just to the north of the stadium; the construction of the Wardlaw Center reduced the stadium's capacity to 46,000.

In 1988, the stadium was renamed in honor of Bobby Dodd, who has the most wins of any coach in the team's history.

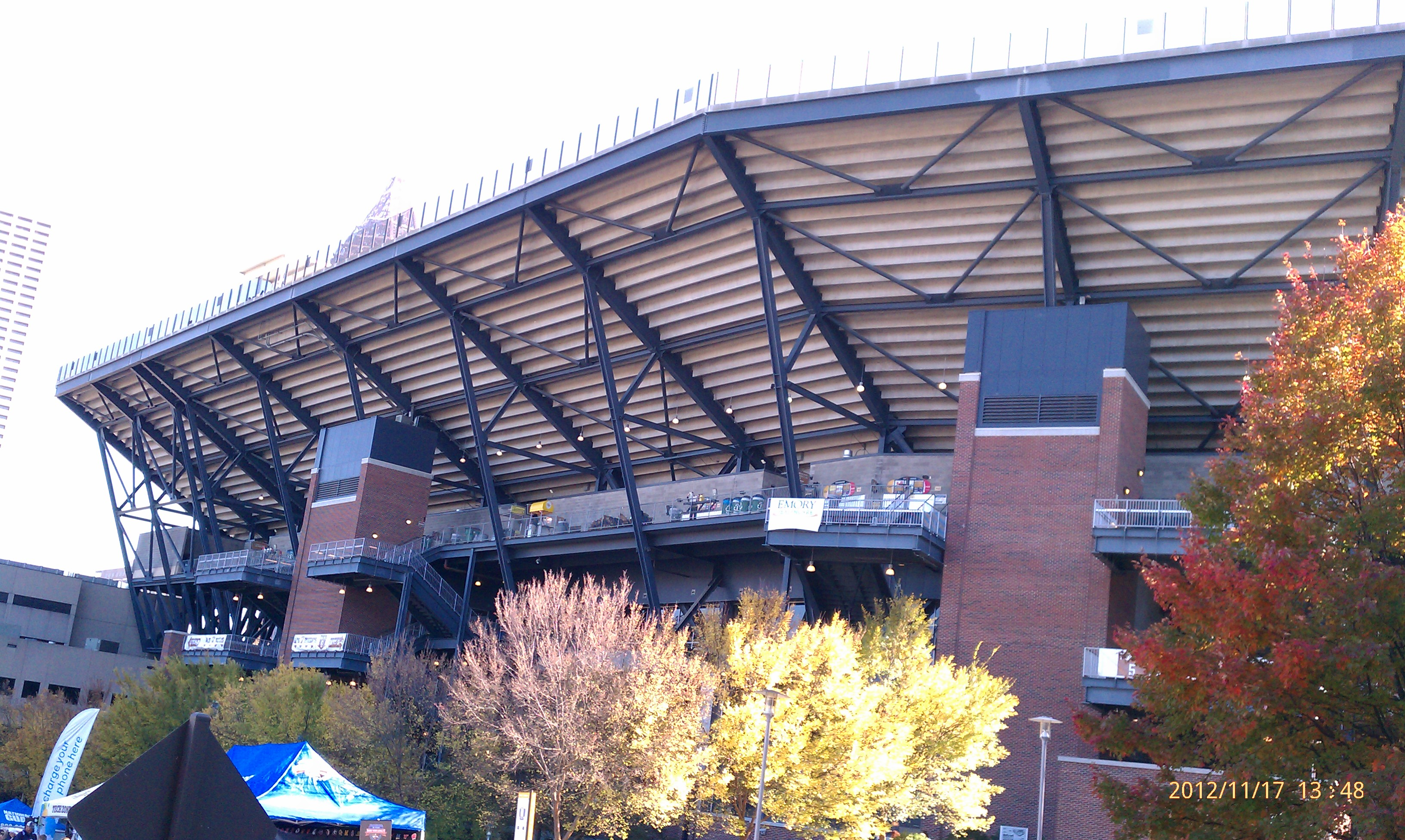
North stands, 2012

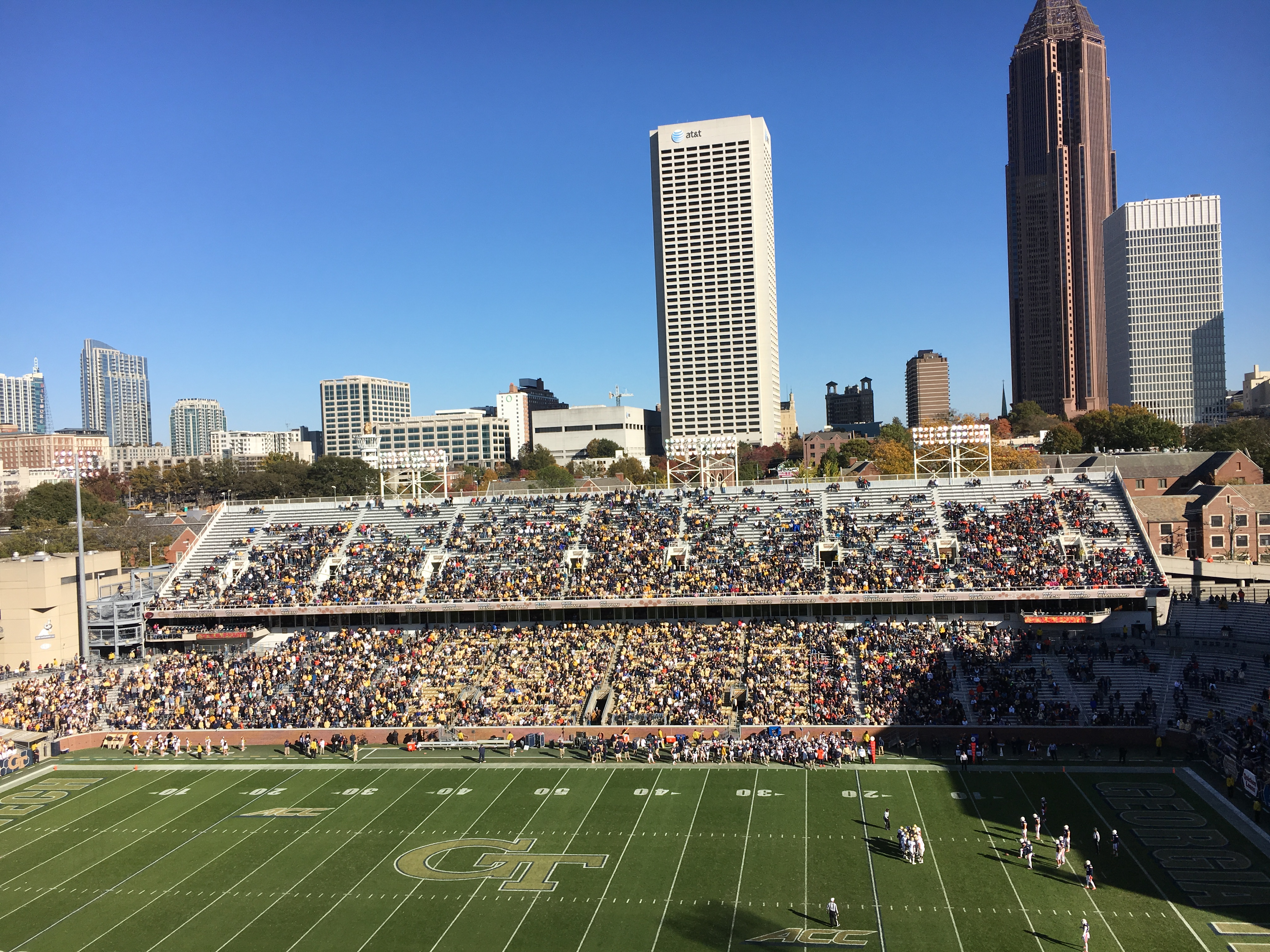
Georgia Tech plays the Virginia Cavaliers at Bobby Dodd Stadium in 2016

The current, modern west grandstand covers the old concrete one, which is still intact underneath. The high interstitial space is currently used for storage. The lighting was replaced in 1998.

In 2001, the stadium served as the home venue for the Atlanta Beat of the Women's United Soccer Association in their inaugural season. Following the 2001 season, a major expansion and renovation project was started, which was done in two phases in order to play the 2002 season in the stadium. For the 2002 season, seating was returned to the South end in front of the Wardlaw Center, and the original North stands and lower east bleachers were rebuilt and bowled in, with a club section featuring chairback seating and an air conditioned lounge added. After the 2002 season, the expansion was completed by adding a massive free standing upper deck in the north end zone. This addition of a north end zone upper deck brought Bobby Dodd Stadium to its current capacity. The new stadium was rededicated during the 2003 home season opener versus the Auburn Tigers on September 2, 2003. Georgia Tech won that game 17–3 in front of a capacity crowd of 55,000.

In the summer of 2009, Bobby Dodd Stadium underwent a number of changes. First, the scoreboard was renovated and after completion, is now twice as big as the old scoreboard. Also, ribbon boards were installed in front of the Wardlaw Center, as well as along the sides of the stadium. Another change was the improvement of the sound system in the stadium.

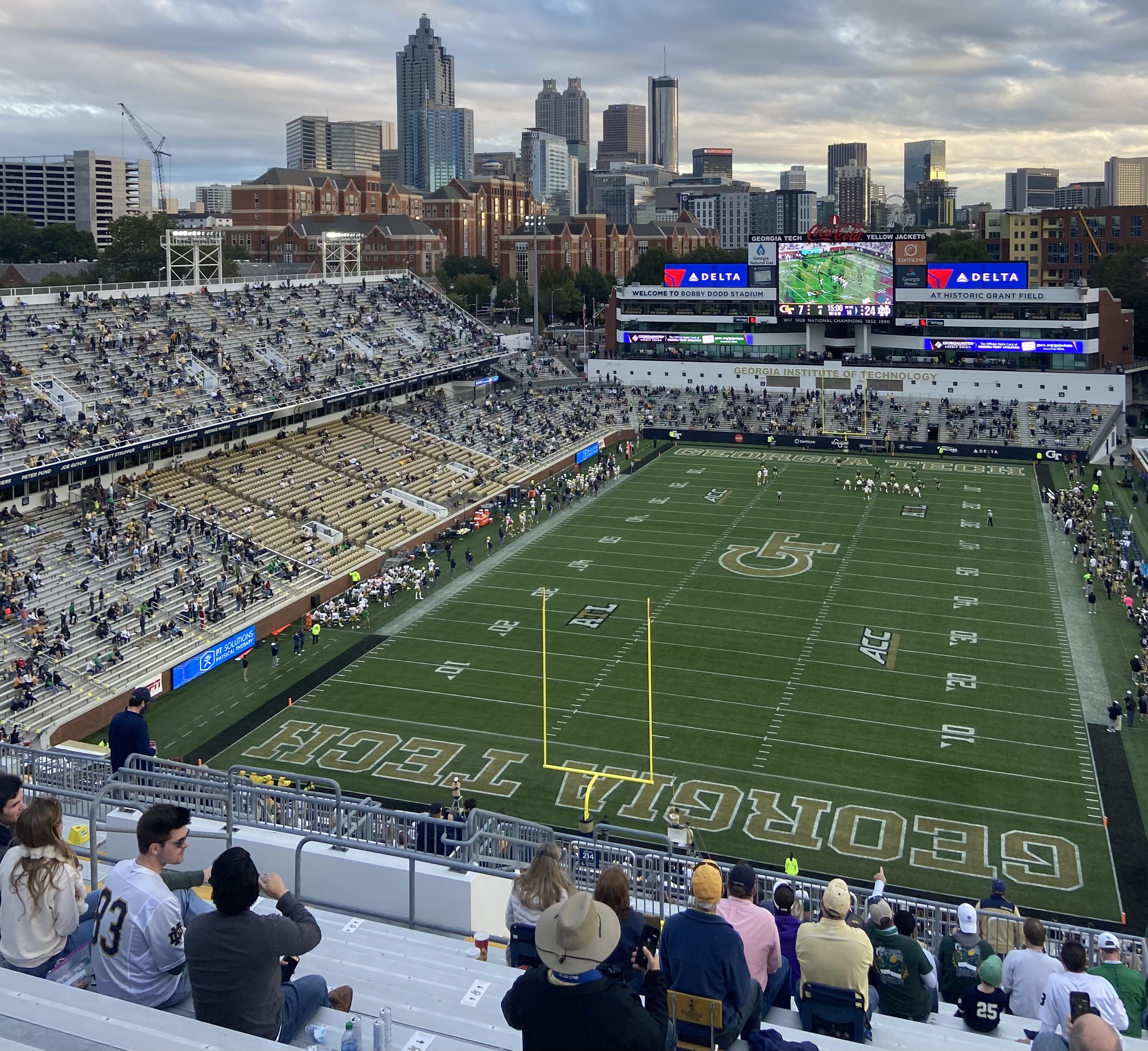
Georgia Tech plays Notre Dame on October 31, 2020, with the stadium's new artificial turf field.

On October 5, 2016, Major League Soccer expansion team Atlanta United FC announced that it would play its home matches for the first half of the 2017 MLS season at Bobby Dodd Stadium until Mercedes-Benz Stadium was ready in mid-2017. The soccer club paid the university and the athletic association over $1 million for the usage of Bobby Dodd Stadium.

In the summer of 2020, Georgia Tech athletics officials announced that the playing surface of Bobby Dodd Stadium would be replaced with the Legion NXT synthetic turf by Shaw Sports. The stadium also got a new sound system, new LED lights, a full rebrand of stadium signage, and renovated restrooms.

On August 8, 2023, Georgia Tech announced a "multi-decade" naming rights deal with the Hyundai Motor Company, with Grant Field changing its name to Hyundai Field. According to the Atlanta Journal-Constitution, the agreement is for 20 years and worth $55 million.

In 2024, sections 218 and 219, and a part of section 217, in the stadium were permanently removed to fit the new Fanning Center, a 100,000 square-foot facility, into the northeast corner of the historic venue. Bobby Dodd Stadium's capacity, starting with the 2024 season, was reduced from 55,000 to 51,913.

In October 2024, plans were announced for "Full Steam Ahead", a $500 million dollar expansion and renovation project to Georgia Tech's athletic facilities, including Bobby Dodd. The plans call for additions to the stadium's amenities and facilities, including the replacement of existing metal bleachers with chairback seats, an additional video board between the North and West stands, and new club level areas, among other additions. The plan was approved by the Board of Regents of the University System of Georgia on May 15, 2025. Construction is set to begin in Fall of 2026 and conclude in 2027.

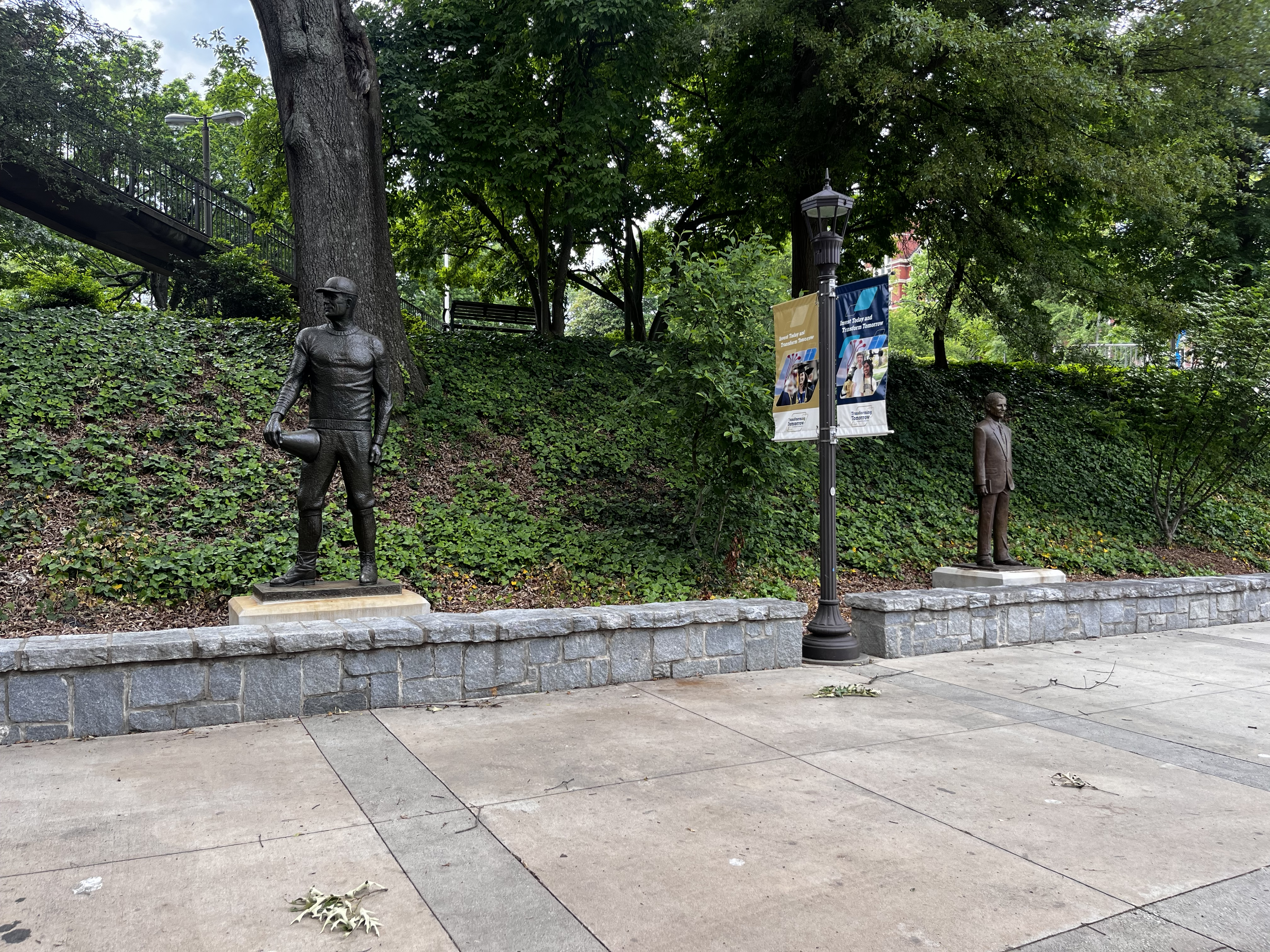
Statues of John Heisman and Dr. Homer Rice located outside SW corner of the stadium.

== Notable games ==
September 27, 1913: Georgia Tech 19, Fort McPherson 0
The first game at the newly christened Grant Field was between Georgia Tech and the soldiers from Atlanta's Fort McPherson. Georgia Tech was met with a decent fight from their Army opponent but ultimately prevailed in a 19–0 shutout.

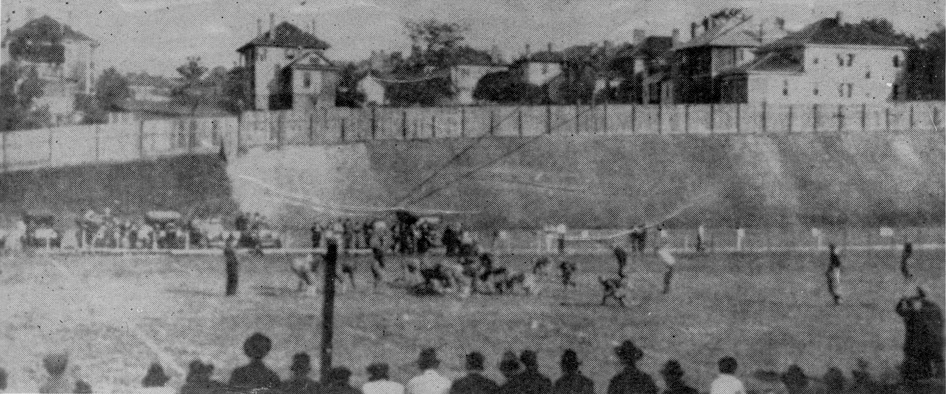
Cumberland vs. Georgia Tech game at Grant Field in 1916; looking east toward Techwood Drive (note houses also visible in other early photos)

October 7, 1916: Georgia Tech 222, Cumberland College 0
In the most lopsided game in American football history, Georgia Tech, under coach John Heisman, defeated Cumberland College, 222–0. It has been said that Coach Heisman was repaying the Bulldogs for a 22–0 baseball defeat the previous year in which Cumberland had allegedly used professional players to ensure victory or conversely that he was showing how that running up the score against weak opponents was vastly influential over the voters in college football rating polls. In any case, the Engineers (as the Georgia Tech team was known at the time) never threw a pass and never took more than four plays to score.

November 29, 1917: Georgia Tech 68, Auburn 7
This win marked the end of the first undefeated, untied National Championship season for the Yellow Jackets. In 1917, Georgia Tech outscored opponents 491–17 in the midst of a 33-game undefeated streak spanning over five seasons.

December 8, 1928: Georgia Tech 20, Georgia 6
This was the culmination of Georgia Tech's second perfect season and National Championship, though the Yellow Jackets would go on to the Rose Bowl to face Cal in what would turn out to be a famous game itself. Georgia Tech played only two away games in its 9–0 regular season lineup hosting Notre Dame, Alabama, Auburn and Georgia. The main reason for this is that many of the other Southern teams' stadiums were not as large or accessible as Grant Field in Midtown Atlanta.

External image
- Old West Stands

November 15, 1952: #4 Georgia Tech 7, #12 Alabama 3
In one of the biggest games of Georgia Tech's third national championship season, two of the highest ranked teams to ever face off on Grant Field saw Georgia Tech defeat Alabama in a closely matched defensive battle. Georgia Tech's Jake "Mouse" Rudolph was knocked unconscious by tackling Alabama's Bobby Marlow on a fourth-down play on the goal line late in the game, which became known as the "$125,000 tackle". This play prevented Alabama from scoring and provided the Yellow Jackets with the opportunity to win the game with one touch down drive. The victory preserved the Yellow Jackets' undefeated record, and Georgia Tech was invited to play in the Sugar Bowl and earned the bowl payout. Tech, which had already defeated number 6 Duke would go on to defeat Florida State, Georgia and undefeated number 7 Mississippi (in the Sugar Bowl) in the midst of a 31-game undefeated streak.

November 17, 1962: Georgia Tech 7, #1 Alabama 6
This upset victory over top-ranked Alabama ended the Crimson Tide's 26-game unbeaten streak. Bobby Dodd called it his greatest victory as Tech thwarted Alabama comeback efforts by preventing a two-point conversion attempt and intercepting a Joe Namath pass deep in their own territory with just 1:05 left.

October 5, 1969: Baltimore Colts 21, Atlanta Falcons 14
This was the only regular season NFL game played at Grant Stadium. The stadium hosted this game because the Atlanta Braves were playing in the National League Championship Series against the New York Mets.

November 6, 1976: Georgia Tech 23, #11 Notre Dame 14
In the most memorable game of a 4–6–1 season, Georgia Tech defeated #11 Notre Dame without throwing a forward pass. After quarterback Gary Lanier was sacked while dropping back to pass in the first quarter, Notre Dame's Ross Browner and Willie Fry celebrated on the field. Georgia Tech coach Pepper Rodgers decided to not allow the Fighting Irish the chance to strut after a sack, and called for a run on every subsequent play. The unusual strategy worked, and the Yellow Jackets upset Notre Dame.

October 13, 1990: #15 Georgia Tech 21, #14 Clemson 19
Only two seasons removed from a 3–8 1988 season, Coach Bobby Ross had led his team to a 4–0 record to face the Tigers. The Yellow Jackets came out on top of this closely matched battle and would go on to defeat number 1 Virginia and number 19 Nebraska in the Citrus Bowl for its fourth national championship.

October 17, 1998: #25 Georgia Tech 41, #7 Virginia 38
In the second meeting between two highly ranked Georgia Tech and Virginia teams (the first being in 1990), Georgia Tech again came out victorious by the same score of 41–38, earning the Yellow Jackets a share of the ACC Championship. Virginia jumped to a big lead in this Georgia Tech homecoming game. Big plays by GT finally put them ahead late in the game, including a dramatic touchdown pass by Joe Hamilton to Dez White. Virginia missed a field goal in the final seconds prompting thousands of Georgia Tech fans to pour onto the field.

November 27, 1999: #16 Georgia Tech 51, #21 Georgia 48 (OT)
In the highest scoring game ever in the series, Georgia overcame a 17-point deficit in the second half to tie the game and appeared to be within easy victory after driving all the way to Tech's 2-yard line with nine seconds left in regulation. Rather than kick a game-winning field goal, Georgia coach Jim Donnan called a running play that was ruled a fumble by Jasper Sanks which Georgia Tech recovered in the endzone. Replays seemed to indicate that the runner was down when the ball came out, anyway Georgia lost. In overtime, after intercepting a Georgia pass in the endzone, Tech attempted a field goal on third down in its possession. The kick was blocked, but Tech holder George Godsey recovered the ball. Tech kicker Luke Manget's second chance at the kick was good. The Georgia Tech student section rushed the field and tore down the goal posts. As of 2023, this remains Georgia Tech's most recent home win over Georgia.

September 2, 2006: #2 Notre Dame 14, Georgia Tech 10
A prime time game in front of a national audience on ABC, the Jackets played toe to toe with the second-ranked Irish but fell just short in a 14–10 defeat. College Gameday came to Atlanta earlier that day. The storyline of a top five Irish squad going up against the Jacket's Calvin Johnson, who at the time was the best college wide receiver in the nation, intrigued sports fans. A crowd of 56,680 squeezed into the stadium, which is the largest crowd in the current configuration of Bobby Dodd Stadium.

November 1, 2008: Georgia Tech 31, #16 Florida State 28
Prior to the November 1 meeting between FSU and Georgia Tech, Bobby Bowden was undefeated against Georgia Tech. Florida State Coach Bobby Bowden had never lost to Georgia Tech in 12 meetings. The last time Georgia Tech defeated Florida State in football was in 1975. During Paul Johnson's first year as head coach, Georgia Tech had a 6–2 record going into the game. Georgia Tech fell behind by a touchdown twice in the first quarter, but pulled ahead in the 2nd quarter to finish the first half leading 24–20. A third-quarter touchdown put Tech up 31–20, but Florida State rallied, scoring a touchdown and converting on the two-point attempt to come within three points. On their final drive Florida State drove down to inside the five-yard line. Florida State running back Marcus Sims received the handoff and was headed for the end zone, but was met by Georgia Tech freshman, Cooper Taylor, son of former Tech QB Jim Bob Taylor. The football was knocked loose into the end zone and recovered by Tech freshman Rashaad Reid to secure the victory for the Jackets. Fans swarmed the field after witnessing their team snap a 12-game losing streak to the Seminoles, Tech's longest to any modern team.

November 20, 2008: Georgia Tech 41, #23 Miami (FL) 23
Under the lights on Thursday night the Jackets made a statement with a pivotal blowout win over Miami. Tech had fallen from the ranks after losing to then nineteenth ranked North Carolina nearly two weeks prior. The Yellow Jackets had a bye week and extra time to prepare for the Hurricanes. Bobby Dodd Stadium was energized for the game. While it is an annual tradition now, this was the first white-out game on the flats. Paul Johnson wanted to excite the fanbase in his first year as coach. Inspired by Penn State, he introduced the white-out to Tech. Come game time, the entire stadium wasn't full (49,335 out of 55,000 seats were filled). But the Tech students packed the sections behind both endzones, creating a tough environment for the Miami offense to play in. Miami was favored by 3.5 points. After the first quarter Tech led 3–0 in a mostly even game. That changed in the second period. Miami faced 3rd & 3 in their own territory. Michael Johnson picked off a pass and ran it back for the first Touchdown of the game. The Jackets would score 21 points in the second, 17 in the third, and cruised to victory. The Jacket offense behind the spread option scheme rushed for 472 yards and wowed an ESPN national audience. The next week the Jackets returned to the polls at #18.

October 17, 2009: #19 Georgia Tech 28, #4 Virginia Tech 23
Played before an emotionally charged crowd, this was the first time Georgia Tech defeated a top-5 team at home since beating No. 1 Alabama 7–6 in 1962. After the victory students rushed the field, tore down the goalpost at the north end zone, and carried it to Georgia Tech President George P. "Bud" Peterson's house. The victory launched the Jackets to #11 in the AP Poll. This was the pivotal game which helped Georgia Tech win the ACC Coastal Division title. Later, the Jackets beat Clemson in the 2009 ACC Championship Game and earned its first conference title since 1998 and its first Orange Bowl berth since 1967. The game is also remembered by Tech fans as the “All The Way Turnt Up game”. GT players made hype videos using the song All the Way Turnt Up which were played on the video board during timeouts. The Tech fans chanted it throughout the game and the Tech team sang it in the locker room postgame. The ACC title was later vacated.

October 29, 2011: Georgia Tech 31, #5 Clemson 17
Before a sellout crowd of 55,646, Georgia Tech rebounded from two consecutive losses to upset #5 Clemson. The Tigers, who were undefeated before the game, turned the ball over 4 times in the game and allowed Georgia Tech to rush for 383 yards. Tevin Washington led the Yellow Jackets by rushing for 176 yards on 27 carries and a touchdown, which was the most rushing yards ever by a Georgia Tech quarterback. The Yellow Jackets raced to a 24–3 halftime lead and held off Clemson, which was 8–0 for the first time since 2000, when Georgia Tech defeated the then #4 Clemson Tigers. It was Tech's first win against a top-5 team since defeating #4 Virginia Tech in 2009.

October 24, 2015: Georgia Tech 22, #9 Florida State 16
Before a sellout crowd of 55,000, Georgia Tech rebounded from five consecutive losses to opponents with combined records of 30–4 to upset #9 Florida State University, a program that had won 28 consecutive conference games, the 2013 Vizio BCS National Championship, and two consecutive Atlantic Coast Conference Titles. Over their last 51 games, Florida State was 48–3. The Seminoles, who were undefeated before the game, had the ball with 3rd and goal to go with eight minutes remaining, up 16–13, when Everett Golson's intended pass was deflected off Georgia Tech cornerback Lawrence Austin's shoe and intercepted by veteran senior safety Jamal Golden. Harrison Butker of the Yellow Jackets nailed a 25-yard field goal with 57 seconds remaining to tie the game at 16. Florida State drove down the field, and set itself up for a 56-yard game-winning field goal by Roberto Aguayo, who was 26 for 26 all time on field goal attempts in the fourth quarter, and 63 for 63 on extra points in the fourth quarter. The potential game-winning kick was blocked by Patrick Gamble of the Yellow Jackets, and recovered by Lance Austin at the 22 yard line, where he dazzled his way amongst a convoy of Georgia Tech blockers 78 yards down the gridiron into the endzone as time expired, giving Georgia Tech its third win of the 2015 season, and third Top 10 win under Paul Johnson's guidance. Fans rushed the field almost immediately after Austin reached the endzone. Ever since the VT game in 2009, the goalposts have been lowered after each game, which prevented fans from tearing them down that night. Regardless, Tech fans partied and celebrated on Grant Field for almost two hours postgame. Some of the Tech players even came back out to party with the fans. This remains one of the most recognizable endings in College Football history, and is known as the “Miracle on Techwood Drive”.

March 5, 2017: Atlanta United 1, New York Red Bulls 2
The first game in Atlanta United history was played before a sellout crowd of 55,297. In the 25th minute, midfielder Yamil Asad scored the very first goal in club history, with the assistance of forward Josef Martínez. The Red Bulls, however, struck back with midfielder Daniel Royer's equalizer in the 76th minute and the game-winning own goal for the Red Bulls scored by United defender Anton Walkes, with the help of Red Bulls forward Bradley Wright-Phillips. United would go on to play another 8 games at Bobby Dodd before moving to their new home at Mercedes-Benz Stadium.

October 28, 2023: Georgia Tech 46, #17 North Carolina 42
Behind 635 yards of offense and Haynes King's fourth touchdown pass of the game with 4:28 to go, Georgia Tech erased an 11-point deficit with 22 points in the final 13 minutes of its 46–42 win over 17th-ranked North Carolina. King's 5-yard touchdown pass to Brett Seither with 4:28 remaining capped a 79-yard drive – the Yellow Jackets’ third scoring drive of the fourth quarter – and proved to be the game-winner. Trailing 35–24, Tech started its comeback when Haynes capped an 88-yard march with a 4-yard touchdown run at the 12:02 mark. King connected with Malik Rutherford on an inside screen for the two-point conversion, bringing the Jackets within 35–31. North Carolina answered with a long kickoff return to set up a quick two-play drive for a touchdown, scoring on a 35-yard pass from Drake Maye to Doc Chapman and extending its lead to 42–32. But it took just 33 seconds for Tech to score next, with Smith bolting 70 yards up the middle for a touchdown to get the Jackets back within 42–39 with 10:40 remaining in the game. After UNC's Noah Burnett's 39-yard field goal missed to the left, Tech capitalized by moving 79 yards on six plays, capped by the go-ahead touchdown pass from King to Seither with 4:28 to go. Maye started leading the Tar Heels down the field once again. Maye completed a 36-yard strike to Tez Walker, but Tech's Ahmari Harvey drilled Walker to knock the ball loose and K.J. Wallace recovered the fumble for the Jackets at their 24-yard line. From there, Tech picked up a pair of first downs to drain the last 2:54 off the clock, setting off a field-storming celebration by an elated Bobby Dodd Stadium crowd.

November 9, 2024: Georgia Tech 28, #4 Miami 23
Georgia Tech kept the nation's top offense at bay and gashed No. 4 Miami's defense for 271 yards on the ground to knock the Hurricanes from the ranks of the unbeaten with a 28–23 win on Homecoming in front of a deafening Tech crowd. Despite throwing just 16 passes in quarterback Haynes King's first start since sustaining an injury nearly a month ago, Georgia Tech (6–4, 4–3 ACC) raced out to a 21–10 lead and held on to hand Miami its first loss of the season. It was Tech's first win over a top four team since the 2009 Virginia Tech win. The win triggered a huge field-storming celebration, and both goalposts were torn down and paraded around campus.

== Capacity ==
Period	Capacity
1913–23	5,304
1924	18,000
1947–57	40,000
1962–66	53,300
1967–87	58,121
1988–2000	46,000
2001	41,000
2002	43,719
2003–2023	55,000
2024–present	51,913

== See also ==
- List of NCAA Division I FBS football stadiums
- List of American football stadiums by capacity
- Lists of stadiums

Events and tenants
Preceded by first stadium	Home of the Peach Bowl; 1968–1970	Succeeded by Atlanta–Fulton County Stadium
Preceded by Miami Orange Bowl	Host of the Drum Corps International; World Championship; 1984	Succeeded by Camp Randall Stadium
Preceded by Francis Field	Host of the College Cup; 1968	Succeeded by Spartan Stadium
Preceded by first stadium	Home of Atlanta United FC; 2017	Succeeded by Mercedes-Benz Stadium
