= Railway accident on the Bostian Bridge =

Rail disaster in the United States

Coordinates: 35.764003°N 80.921669°W

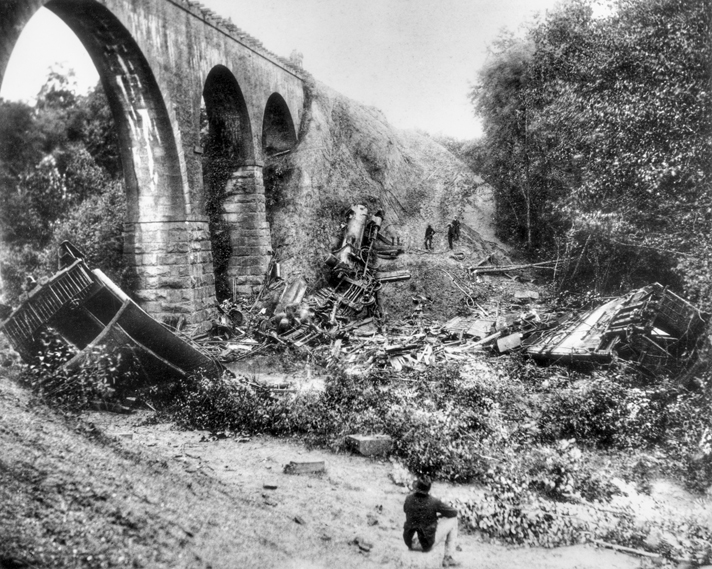
Railway accident on the Bostian Bridge

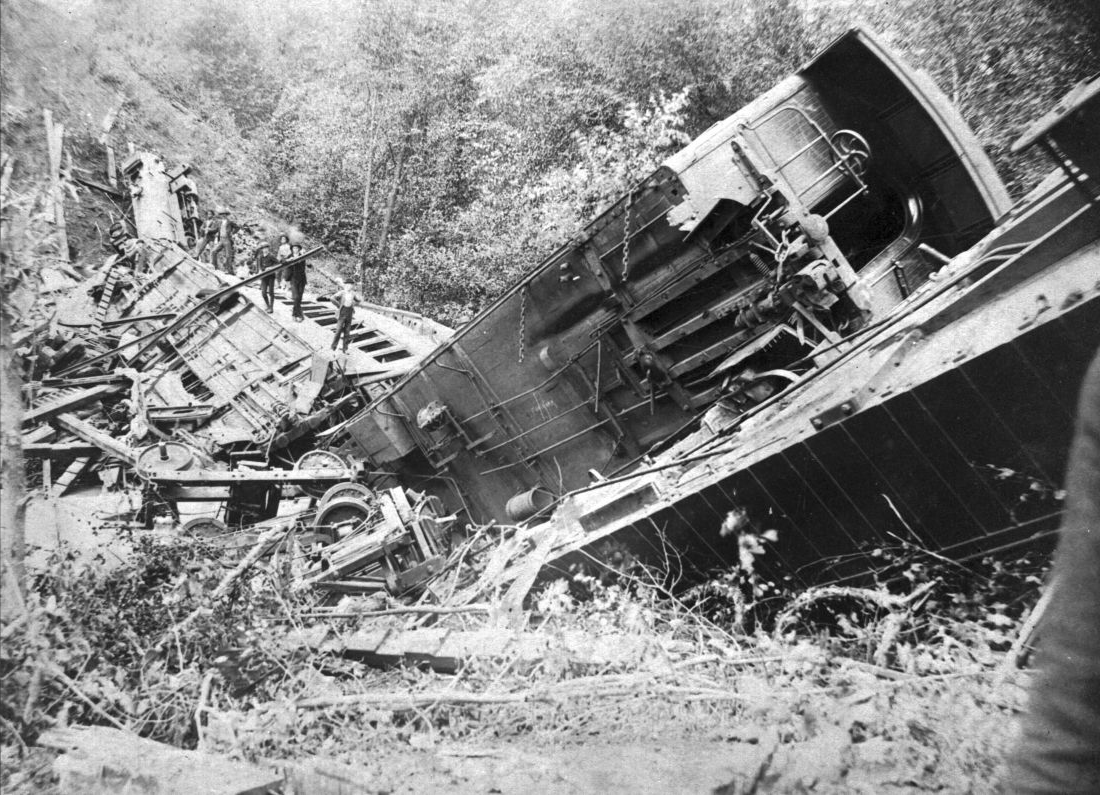
The derailed carriages

The railway accident on the Bostian Bridge killed 23 people on August 27, 1891, west of Statesville, North Carolina, when a Richmond & Danville Railroad train derailed.

On the same day, 119 years later, a trespassing pedestrian was hit and killed by a train on the bridge.

== Accident ==
Steam Locomotive No. 166 of train No. 9 of the Richmond & Danville Railroad (R & D) left Statesville on August 27, 1891, at around 2:30 a.m. with a five-car train: a baggage car, a first- and second-class car, a Pullman sleeper, and the railroad superintendent's private car [Bridger's] from the Atlantic Coast Line Railroad. The train was 34 minutes late and travelled at probably 35 to 40 miles per hour (55–65 km/h) to catch up on the delay. Less than five minutes after the train had left Statesville, it derailed and crashed from the Bostian Bridge, a 60- foot (18-meter), five-bay natural stone and brick bridge that spans Third Creek. The sleeping car hit the ground 153 feet (47 m) from where it had left the bridge.

Several of the less heavily injured survivors ran back to Statesville to report the disaster. Rescue workers made their way to the train, and took the injured to Statesville, which did not have a hospital, so they needed to be accommodated and cared for in private homes. The dead were taken to a tobacco warehouse for identification.

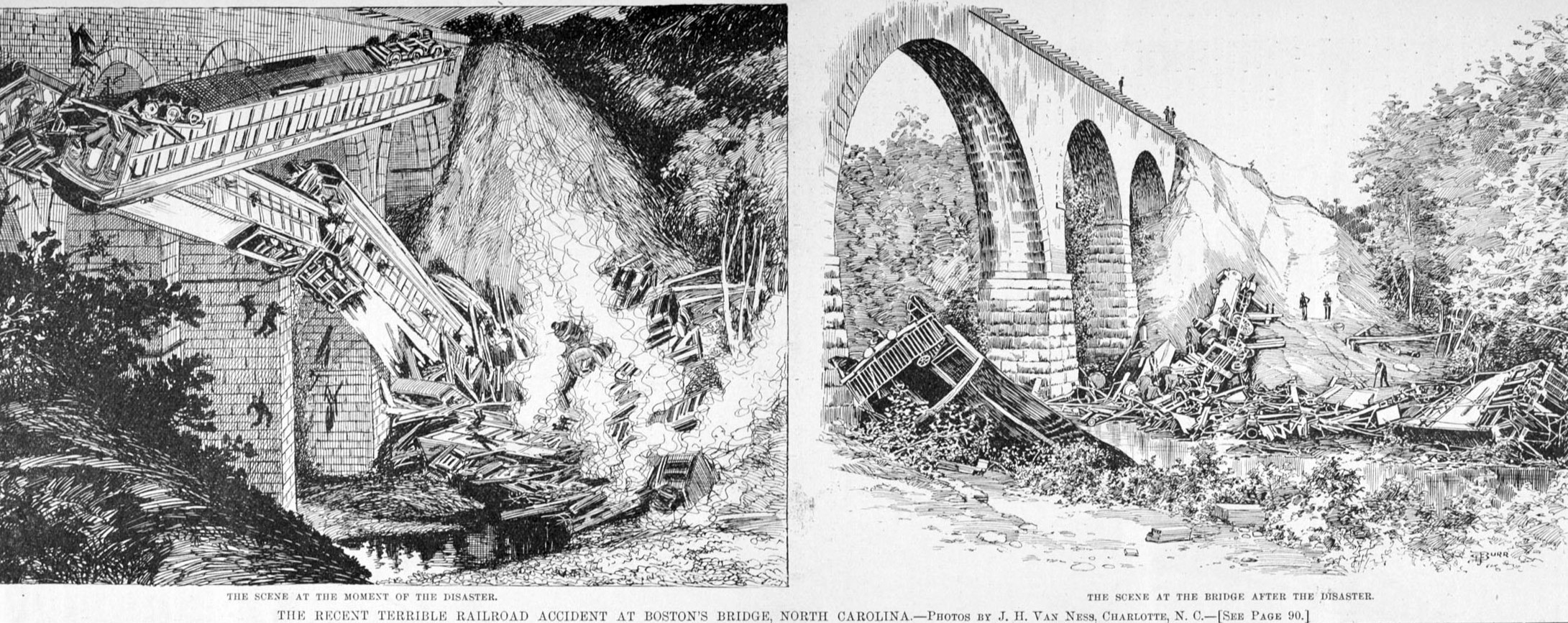
Drawings after photos by JH Van Ness

After the rescue, thousands of onlookers came. The photographers William Stimson from Statesville and JH Van Ness from Charlotte took pictures and sold hundreds of them in the following weeks. An illustration of the accident illustrated with a Van Ness photo appeared in Frank Leslie's Weekly, an illustrated newspaper.

== Investigation ==
Four days after the accident, a judicial inquiry concluded that the accident had been caused by unknown persons removing spikes from the rails, which were probably in neglected condition. As R & D was experiencing financial difficulties, those who feared large claims for compensation worked feverishly to find the alleged saboteurs. For months railroad detectives swarmed through the area. Several people were detained and interrogated, but eventually released. In 1897, two men who were already in the state penitentiary were convicted of alleged confessions to other inmates causing the accident.

== Subsequent events ==
According to legend, on the anniversary of the accident, the screeching of the wheels and screams of the passengers can still be heard, and the ghost of a uniformed railway employee can be seen with a gold watch. According to slightly varying accounts, the ghost of the man with the golden clock was first seen on the first anniversary of the accident. It is said to have been the spirit of Baggage Master Hugh K. Linster, whose body was found with a broken neck in the wreckage.

On the morning of August 27, 1941, the fiftieth anniversary of the accident, the rider of a car that had a flat tire was waiting for help. She thought she had heard and seen a train crash off the bridge, shattering its old-fashioned wooden passenger cars. The woman could hear the screaming and moaning of wounded. Her husband and the owner of a nearby shop found no wreck in Third Creek.

On the 119th anniversary of the accident, on August 27, 2010, just before 3:00 am, 10 to 12 amateur ghost observers were illegally on the bridge, hoping to hear the sounds of the accident and perhaps see something. Instead, a real Norfolk Southern train came with three locomotives and one carriage. The terrified ghost observers ran about 150 foot (50 m) back towards Statesville, to get to safety. The 29-year-old Christopher Kaiser from Charlotte was hit by the train and killed. A woman, whom Kaiser wanted to bring to safety, fell about 30 to 40 feet from the bridge and was so badly injured that she had to be treated at Carolinas Medical Center in Charlotte.
