= John W. Grant =

American businessman (1867–1938)

John W. Grant (July 26, 1867, West Point, Georgia – March 8, 1938) was a member of the Georgia School of Technology board of trustees and a well-known Atlanta, Georgia, merchant around the 1880s.

He was the grandson of John T. Grant and the son of William D. Grant, both of whom were successful railroad builders with their Fannin, Grant & Company.

With help from his grandfather, he was made president of the Gate City Loan, Saving and Banking Company at the age of 21. In 1902, he was a director of the Atlanta-based Third National Bank.

He married the daughter of Hugh T. Inman who gave him the Kimball House as a wedding gift. By this time Grant the younger was well-placed in Atlanta society, where he was heavily involved in the Capital City Club and Piedmont Driving Club.

Grant was also the benefactor of Grant Field, the home of the Georgia Tech Yellow Jackets football team, naming it in honor of his deceased son, Hugh Inman Grant (1895–1906).
