= Richmond and York River Railroad =

Railway company in the United States, active 1853–1894

Overview
- Locale: Virginia
- Dates of operation: 1853–1894
- Successor: Richmond, York River and Chesapeake Railroad Company; Southern Railway Company

Technical
- Track gauge: 4 ft 8 1/2 in (1,435 mm) standard gauge
- Previous gauge: 5 ft (1,524 mm) American Civil War era. Converted to 4 ft 9 in (1,448 mm) in 1886

The Richmond and York River Railroad Company was incorporated under an act of the Virginia General Assembly on January 31, 1853. The State of Virginia subscribed to 60 per cent of the capital stock. The company built and initially operated 39 miles (63 km) of railroad line between Richmond, Virginia and West Point, Virginia on the York River. The railroad prospered during the first year of the American Civil War but was wrecked during the Peninsula Campaign. It was rebuilt after the Civil War. In 1894, it became part of the Southern Railway Company.

== Organization; American Civil War ==
In January 1857, the Richmond and York River Railroad Company issued $400,000 in mortgage bonds. Before and during the American Civil War, the company repaid $53,000 on the mortgage dated September 9, 1859 which secured these bonds. The State increased its subscription to the capital stock of the company under an act of the Virginia General Assembly passed March 25, 1858.

In 1861, the company completed construction of 39 miles (63 km) of railroad line between Richmond, Virginia and West Point, Virginia on the York River, which was opened for operation on March 29, 1861. The western terminus was adjacent to Richmond's Tobacco Row. West Point was a shipping port at the head of the York River, which is formed by the confluence of the Pamunkey River and the Mattaponi River.

The Virginia General Assembly passed an act on February 13, 1861, under which the company purchased the steamer West Point to operate from the terminal and to make connections with steamboat lines or other navigation lines.

Initially, the railroad made a profit transporting supplies for the Confederate States of America Government. The railroad was wrecked during the Peninsula Campaign of the American Civil War in 1862 and was completely abandoned for several years.

== Rehabilitation and reorganization ==
After the Civil War, the holders of the remaining $347,000 of bonds agreed to subordinate their lien to the lien of a new mortgage dated January 1, 1866 in order to raise funds to rebuild the railroad. The line reopened in 1867. On June 27, 1870, the Virginia General Assembly authorized extension of the line to a point on the Chesapeake Bay or its tributaries between the mouth of the Rappahannock River and Yorktown, Virginia The company was bankrupt before this extension of the line, which was to be located about 20 miles (32 km) east to the mouth of the Piankatank River in Gloucester County, Virginia could be carried out.

The Richmond and York River Railroad Company defaulted in the payment of its interest charges and its mortgages were foreclosed on December 16, 1872. The purchasers of all the property and franchises of the company as of May 2, 1873, under a deed dated July 4, 1873, reorganized the railroad under the general law of Virginia as the Richmond, York River and Chesapeake Railroad. A new first mortgage on the railroad line, dated October 15, 1873, to secure $400,000 of bonds due January 1, 1894, later extended to January 1, 1910, was given to William P. Clyde, Isaac Davenport Jr. and John Stewart, Trustees. The purchasers were mainly interested in connecting the railroad with their steamer lines on the Chesapeake Bay and they started a regular service between West Point and Baltimore, Maryland. Under an act of the Virginia General Assembly approved February 28, 1874, the Richmond, York River and Chesapeake Railroad was authorized to acquire stock in the connecting water line, the Baltimore, Chesapeake and Richmond Steamboat Company, a Maryland corporation. The through rail and water line between Richmond and Baltimore was known as the "York River Line."

== Clyde interests; water line connection ==
In 1873, the Richmond, York River and Chesapeake Railroad and the Richmond and Danville Railroad built a connecting line between their termini in Richmond. On April 8, 1875, the two railroads and the steamboat company entered into a traffic agreement under which the rail and water lines became part of the Piedmont Air-Line for through business to and from the Southern United States. This agreement introduced the Clyde interests into the business of the Richmond and Danville Railroad. These interests obtained control of the Richmond and Danville by purchase from the Southern Railway Security Company, which had been formed by the Pennsylvania Railroad Company in 1880.

The Virginia General Assembly authorized the railroad to issue additional bonds in an act approved March 4, 1880 in order to extend the terminal facilities at West Point. A second mortgage, dated November 10, 1880 to secure $500,000 of bonds due November 1, 1900, later extended to November 1, 1910, was given to William P. Clyde, Isaac Davenport Jr. and John Stewart, Trustees.

== Richmond and Danville Railroad lease ==
The Clyde interests obtained control of the Richmond and Danville Railroad in 1881. An act of the Virginia General Assembly approved July 11, 1870 already had authorized the Richmond and Danville Railroad to lease the railroad line between Richmond, Virginia and West Point, Virginia. Under this authority, the Richmond, York River and Chesapeake Railroad was leased to the Richmond and Danville Railroad on July 9, 1881, for a term of 999 years for payment of the principal and interest on the two issues of mortgage bonds and 6 per cent interest on the stock of the Richmond, York River and Chesapeake. The lease also conveyed to the Richmond and Danville 1,251 shares of the capital stock of the Baltimore, Chesapeake and Richmond Steamboat Company which the Richmond, York River and Chesapeake had acquired in 1874.

Under the Clyde interests, the Richmond and Danville Railroad Company had incorporated the Richmond and West Point Terminal Railway and Warehouse Company on March 8, 1880, to acquire lines to which the Richmond and Danville did not connect or lines in other States. Although the Richmond Terminal Company, as it was often referred to, was organized as a holding company for the acquisition of other lines by the Richmond and Danville Railroad, the holding company came to control the Richmond and Danville and several other companies which were leased to the Richmond and Danville.

== Bankruptcy; reorganization; Southern Railway Company ==
By 1891, the Richmond Terminal Company was insolvent and in December 1891 a committee was appointed to prepare a plan of reorganization. Two plans were presented and rejected by the securities holders in May 1892. The Richmond and Danville and other railroads controlled by the Richmond Terminal Company went into bankruptcy along with the Richmond Terminal Company in June 1892. Temporary receivers were appointed for the Richmond and Danville on June 16, 1892, and a receiver was appointed for the Richmond Terminal Company on June 22, 1892.

The securities holders then asked Drexel, Morgan and Company, soon to be J.P. Morgan & Co., to prepare a plan of reorganization for the Richmond Terminal Company and the companies in which that company had an interest. The Richmond Terminal Reorganization Committee, Charles H. Coster, George Sherman and Anthony J. Thomas, presented an agreement dated May 1, 1893, modified February 20, 1894, in which the old securities would be deposited with the committee, who would form a new corporation to issue new securities and establish a cash fund for the repair and renewal of the properties. Under an act of the Virginia General Assembly of February 20, 1894, the purchasers of the foreclosed properties, Charles H. Coster and Anthony J. Thomas, and their associates, Samuel Spencer, A. B. Andrews, Francis Lynde Stetson, and W. A. C. Ewen, organized Southern Railway Company, June 18, 1894.

The purchasers of the Richmond and Danville Railroad rejected the lease of the Richmond, York River and Chesapeake Railroad because all of the stock of that company had been deposited with the Richmond Terminal Reorganization Committee. This permitted the committee to convey the Richmond, York River and Chesapeake Railroad line between Richmond, Virginia and West Point, Virginia and the company's 1,251 shares of the Baltimore, Chesapeake and Richmond Steamboat Company to Southern Railway Company on June 28, 1894, in consideration of the assumption by Southern Railway Company of the Richmond, York River and Chesapeake mortgage debt. Southern Railway Company began operations of the former Richmond and Danville Railroad Company lines, including the former Richmond, York River and Chesapeake Railroad line, on July 1, 1894.

== See also ==
- Confederate railroads in the American Civil War
