= Richmond and Danville Railroad =

1800s railway, initially based in Virginia

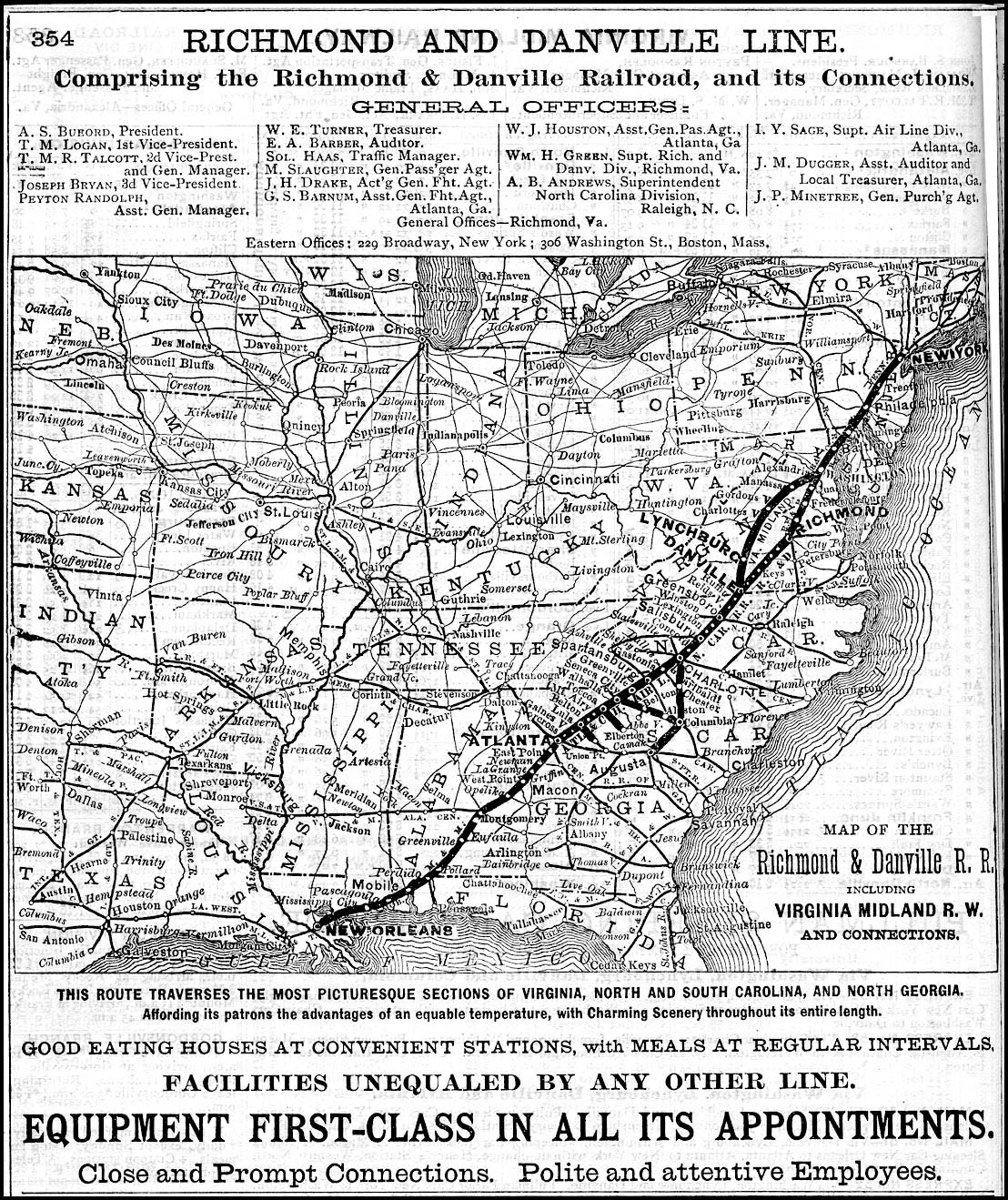
- 1882 map of the Richmond and Danville Railroad and connections

Overview
- Headquarters: Richmond, Virginia
- Locale: Virginia; Leased lines in North Carolina, South Carolina, Georgia
- Founder: Whitmell P. Tunstall
- Dates of operation: 1847–1894
- Predecessor: none
- Successor: Southern Railway; Norfolk Southern

Technical
- Track gauge: 4 ft 8 1/2 in (1,435 mm) standard gauge
- Previous gauge: 5 ft (1,524 mm); American Civil War era 4 ft 9 in (1,448 mm)

The Richmond and Danville Railroad (reporting mark R&D) was a railroad that operated independently from 1847 until 1894, first in the U.S. state of Virginia, and later on 3,300 miles (5,300 km) of track in nine states.

Chartered on March 9, 1847, the railroad completed its 140-mile (230 km) line between Richmond and Danville in 1856. During the American Civil War, the railroad was a vital link between the Confederate capital of Richmond and the rest of the Confederacy. After the Civil War, the railroad grew to become the 3,300-mile (5,300 km) Richmond and Danville Railroad Company System.

Placed in receivership in 1892, the Richmond and Danville Railroad Company was sold in 1894 and conveyed into the new Southern Railway Company (later the Norfolk Southern Railway) in 1896 and 1897.

== History ==
=== Beginnings (1847-61) ===
The new Richmond and Danville Railroad was championed by Whitmell P. Tunstall, a lawyer in Chatham, Virginia, who was also a member of the Virginia General Assembly. After many years, Tunstall secured a charter for the new railroad on March 9, 1847. In the same year, the state of Virginia took a 60% interest in the capital stock of the company, which it would hold until 1871.

Construction on the 144.7-mile (232.9 km) line began on January 31, 1848, under the supervision of Col. Andrew Talcott, who was later to become the Richmond and Danville's general manager. By 1850, the new railroad had reached Coalfield Station, near the coal mines in an area known today as Midlothian in western Chesterfield County. There, it competed with the mule-powered Chesterfield Railroad, the first railroad established in Virginia. Lawsuits followed, but the older railroad was quickly supplanted by the competition. The Virginia General Assembly allowed the Richmond and Danville Railroad to buy the Chesterfield Railroad for as much as $200,000 in 1848.

By the end of 1851, the line had reached Jetersville in Amelia County. Two years later, it was completed to a point near Drakes Branch, and had been graded to South Boston in Halifax County. On May 16, 1856, the railroad had finished construction of the main line.

In 1856, the Richmond and Danville Railroad was 140.5 miles (226 km) long, with bridges over the James River, the Staunton River and the Dan River. Its stations included:

- Richmond
- Midlothian Coal Pits
- Amelia Court House
- Jetersville
- Jennings Ordinary
- Burkeville
- Meherrin
- Keysville
- Mossingford, now Mossingford Road Virginia State Route 642, in Charlotte County.
- Clover
- South Boston
- New's Ferry in Halifax County
- Barksdale in Halifax County
- Ringgold
- Dan River
- Danville

=== Civil War (1861–1865) ===
Known as the "first railroad war", the American Civil War devastated the South's railroads and economy. In 1862, the Richmond and York River Railroad — acquired after the war by the R&D — played a crucial role in George McClellan's Peninsula Campaign.

In 1862, the R&D employed 400 laborers, 50 train hands, 30 carpenters, and 20 blacksmiths. The railroad also employed 300 slaves, some of whom it owned and some whose labor it rented from local planters. If a rented slave was injured or killed, the railroad reimbursed his or her owner; in one instance, the R&D paid $1,379.44 for a slave killed in an accident. Some enslaved women were put to work as maids in ladies' dining cars.

The Richmond and Danville Railroad was an essential transportation link for the Confederacy throughout the war. It provided the production of south-central Virginia to Richmond. When the Richmond and Petersburg Railroad was cut in 1864, the R&D's connection with the Piedmont Railroad was the only remaining connection from Richmond to the rest of the South.

The Confederate Army was often handicapped by its inability to transport supplies efficiently from depots to forces in the field. In one case, the war forced the Confederate government to overrule objections by North Carolina. That state had blocked construction of a rail connection from Greensboro to Danville, fearing that post-war trade from North Carolina's Piedmont would continue to flow to Richmond via the R&D.

==== April 1865 ====
Following successful Union attacks on April 1, 1865, Confederate Gen. Robert E. Lee abandoned Petersburg and headed west and south in an attempt to join Gen. Joseph Johnston's army in North Carolina.

After evacuating Richmond the next day, on April 2, 1865, Confederate President Jefferson Davis and his cabinet left Richmond on the R&D. The departing Confederates set fire to the bridge across the James River between Richmond and Manchester. They traveled to Danville, where they attempted to set up a temporary government.

On reaching Amelia Court House during the morning of April 4, 1865, Lee searched the commissary stores, finding abundant ordnance but no food. Lee waited 24 hours in vain there for R&D trains to arrive with badly needed supplies. Union cavalry, meanwhile, sped forward and cut the Richmond & Danville at Jetersville. Lee had to abandon the railroad, and his army stumbled across rolling country towards Lynchburg. On the morning of April 9, 1865, Palm Sunday, Lee met Grant in the front parlor of Wilmer McLean's home near Appomattox Court House to surrender.

=== Reconstruction (1865–94) ===
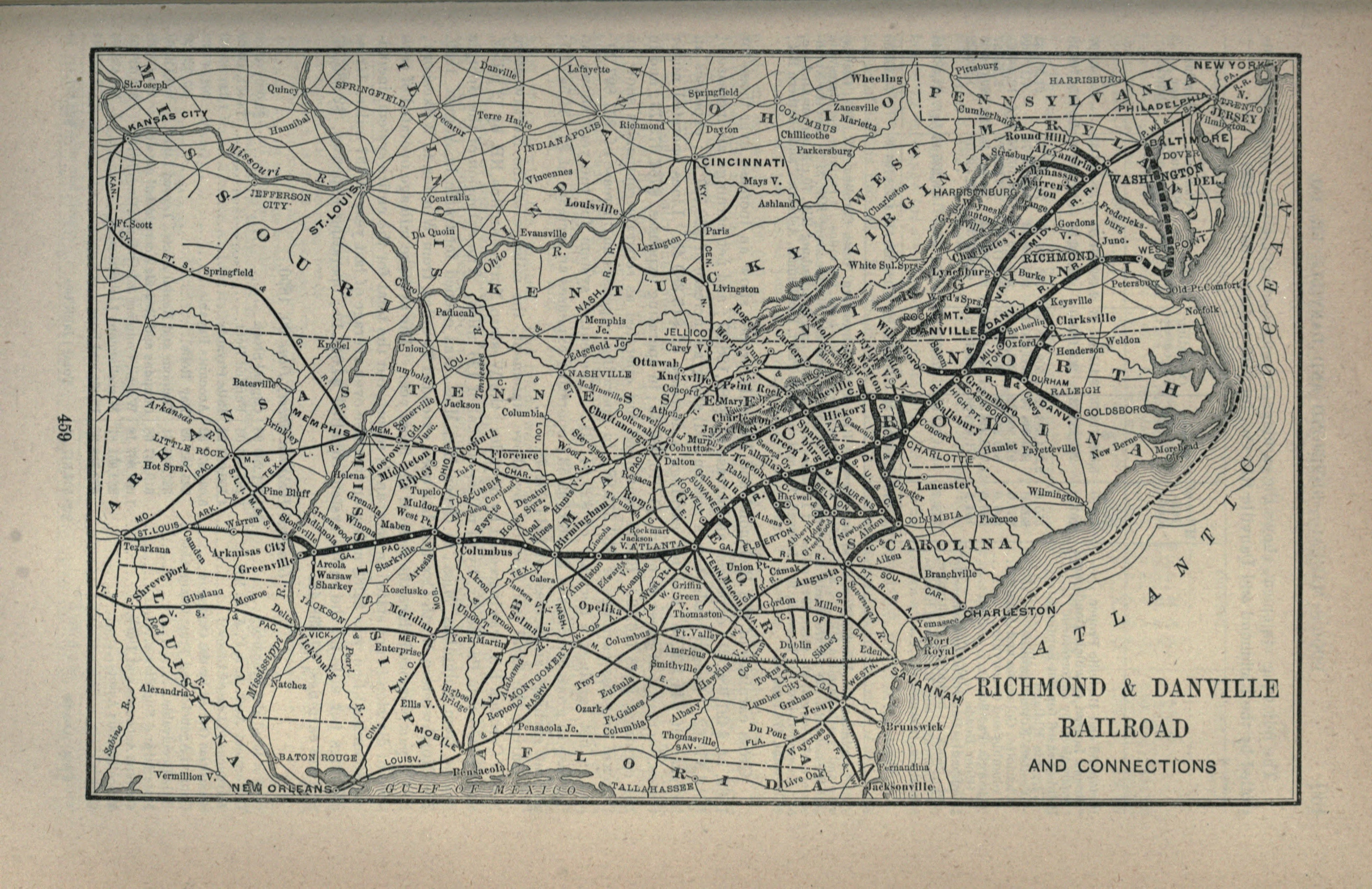
1891 map of Richmond and Danville Railroad and connections

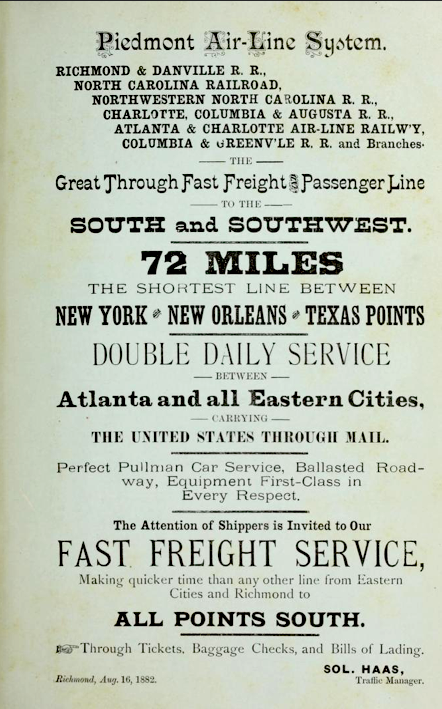
Piedmont Air Line System advertisement 1882

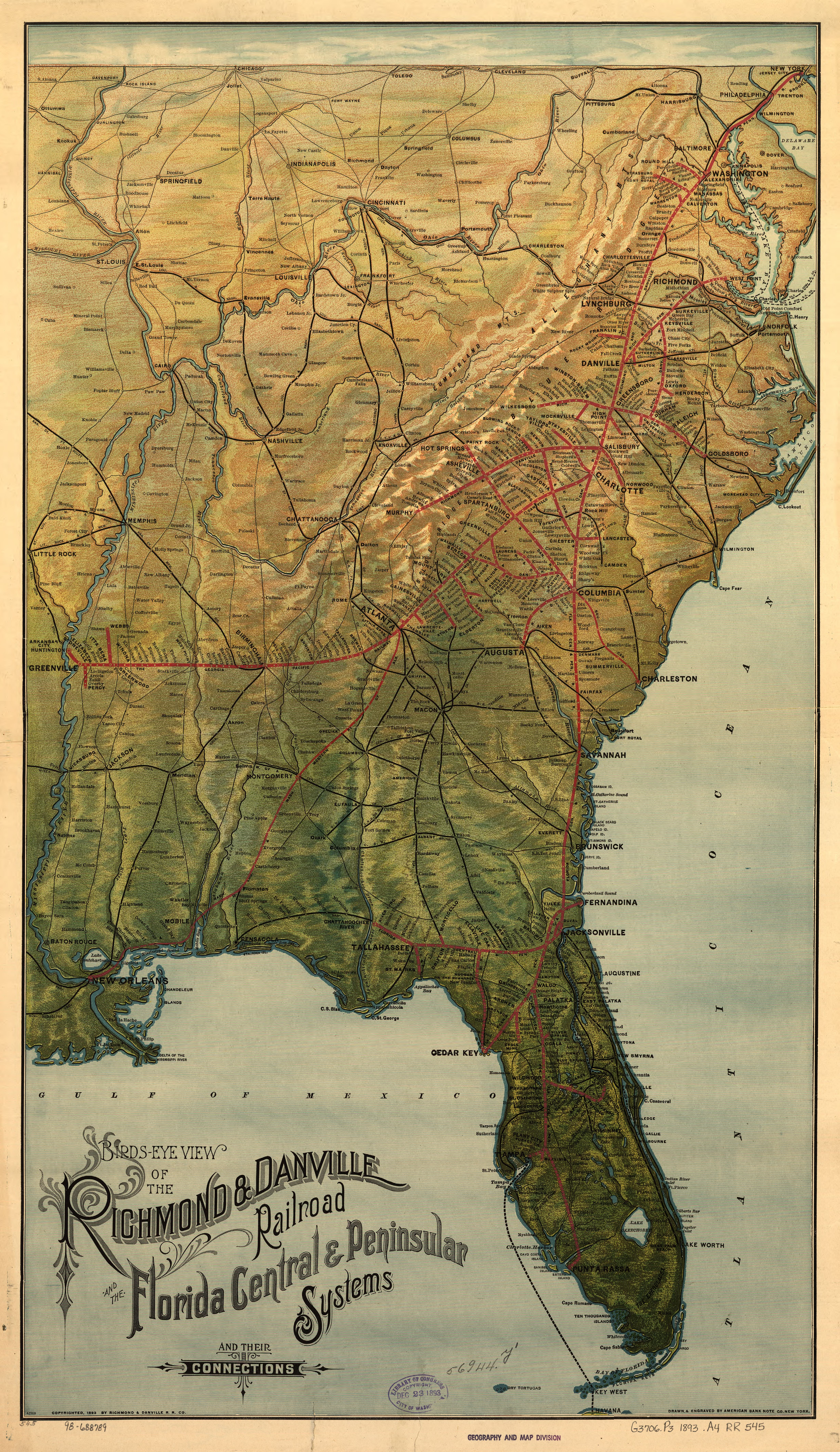
1893 map (also showing the Florida Central and Peninsular Railroad and connections)

With the support of Virginia Governor Francis H. Pierpont, Algernon S. Buford became president of the 140-mile (230 km) R&D on September 13, 1865. Repair work began on war-damaged tracks, including the bridge across the James River between Manchester and Richmond.

Over the next 20 years, Buford, Richmonder James H. Dooley, and other leaders extended the railroad's trackage to 3,000 miles through construction and acquisition. Early acquisitions included the Piedmont Railroad in 1866 and a 25-year lease of the North Carolina Railroad in 1871.

In 1871, the Southern Railway Security Company acquired the 60 percent stake in the railroad held by the state of Virginia. Another large shareholder was the Pennsylvania Railroad.

In 1877, Buford joined with Andrew Talcott, Thomas Mann Talcott, and others to form the Bon Air Land and Improvement Company, a land investment that added a resort train stop in Bon Air six miles east of Richmond.

In 1880, control of the R&D was acquired by William P. Clyde and interests that controlled the Richmond, York River and Chesapeake Rail Road Company.

In 1881, the Richmond and West Point Terminal Railway and Warehouse Company was organized to develop and expand the R&D, whose charter limited its control of connecting railroads.

In 1882, the R&D, along with the North Carolina Railroad, Northwestern North Carolina Railroad, Charlotte, Columbia and Augusta Railroad, Atlanta and Charlotte Air-Line Railway and the Columbia and Greenville Railroad lines were being operated as the Piedmont Air-Line System advertised as the shortest line between New York, New Orleans and Texas. One improvement that year was the installation of two steam powered Nutter car hoists in north Danville, Virginia, in order to allow truck exchange to allow cars to be exchanged across the break of gauge with the Virginia Midland Railway.

In or about 1886, the Richmond and West Point Terminal Railway and Warehouse Company acquired a majority of R&D Company stock, and thus control of the railroad.

By 1890, the R&D System covered 3,300 miles (5,300 km) of track in Virginia, North Carolina, South Carolina, Georgia, Tennessee, Alabama, Mississippi, Arkansas, and Texas. However, the R&D System had become financially unstable during all the growth. After the Richmond and West Point Terminal Railway and Warehouse Company, declared bankruptcy, the R&D Company was pulled down with it. Receivers were appointed to take possession of its property, including its subsidiaries, on June 15, 1892.

=== Southern Railway System (1894-1982) ===
On June 18, 1894, the R&D was sold in foreclosure. Its property was surrendered to Southern Railway Company for operation on July 1, 1894, even though the deeds of conveyance were not completed and filed until later. Reorganized by J.P. Morgan and his New York banking firm of Drexel, Morgan and Company, the R&D was merged with five other railroads to form the new Southern Railway.

The R&D property was formally conveyed to Southern Railway Company by deeds dated January 9, 1896, and August 30, 1897. The Southern Railway Company, incorporated in Virginia on the same date, June 18, 1894, controlled over 4,000 miles (6,400 km) of line at its inception. Samuel Spencer became Southern's first president.

=== Norfolk Southern (1982-present) ===
Norfolk Southern Corporation, a holding corporation, acquired control of Norfolk and Western Railway Company and Southern Railway Company and their affiliates and subsidiaries on June 1, 1982, after approval by the Interstate Commerce Commission. Effective December 31, 1990, Southern Railway Company changed its name to Norfolk Southern Railway Company. Norfolk and Western Railway Company became a wholly owned subsidiary of Norfolk Southern Railway Company rather than a subsidiary of Norfolk Southern Corporation. In 1999, the system grew substantially with the acquisition of over half of Consolidated Rail Corporation (Conrail).

== Officers ==
=== Presidents ===
- Whitmell P. Tunstall (1847 – February 19, 1854)
- A. F. D. (Adolphus Frederick Danberry) Gifford (February 19, 1854 – April 13, 1854) (acting president)
- Vincent Witcher (April 13, 1854 – December 10, 1856)
- Lewis E. Harvie (December 10, 1856 – September 12, 1865)
- Algernon Sidney Buford (September 13, 1865 – December 16, 1886)
- George S. Scott (1884, December 21, 1887 – December 18, 1889)
- Alfred Sully (December 16, 1886 – December 21, 1887)
- John H. Inman (December 18, 1889 – March 16, 1892)
- Walter G.(George) Oakman (March 16, 1892 – 1894)

=== Vice presidents ===
- A. F. D. Gifford
- A. Y. Stokes (1868 or before – 1880/1)
- Joseph N.(Napoleon) DuBarry (Btw. 1876 and 1878 – 1880/1)
- Thomas M. Logan (1881/2 – 1883), 1st VP
- T. M. R.(Thomas Mann Randolph) Talcott (1881/2 – 1883, 1888/9 – 1889), 2nd VP 1881/2–1883, 1st VP 1888/9–1889
- Joseph Bryan (1881/2 – 1884), 3rd VP
- Calvin S. Brice (1884), 1st VP
- Alfred L. Rives (1883 – 1885/6), 2nd VP
- Frederick W. Huidekoper (1885 – 1885/6), 1st VP
- Walter G.(George) Oakman (Fall 1883 – 1887, 1887 – May 1, 1891), 3rd VP Fall 1883–1887, 2nd VP 1887–1888, 1st VP 1888–May 1, 1891, Pres. 1892–1894
- Alexander B.(Boyd) Andrews (1886/7 – 1894), 3rd VP 1886/7–1889, 2nd VP 1890–1894
- Henry Fink (April 30, 1887 – December 16, 1887)
- J. W. Johnston (1890), 3rd VP
- Peyton Randolph (1891), 3rd VP
- John A. Rutherford (1892 – 1894), 3rd VP

== Acquired railroads ==
- Piedmont Railroad: A 48.5-mile line from Danville, Virginia, to Greensboro, North Carolina. Chartered in March 1862. Construction began 1862 and ended late 1863. The R&D bought most shares and built and operated the railroad. Leased to R&D for 86 years on February 20, 1874. Bought by the Southern Railway in 1894.
- North Carolina Railroad – A 223.15-mile line from Goldsboro to Charlotte, North Carolina, leased for 30 years (starting Oct. 1871) on September 11, 1871, for an annual rent of $260,000. The North Carolina Railroad Company was chartered on January 27, 1849, and the line opened January 30, 1856. The R&D made an offer to lease the NC RR in January 1871 but was rejected. In September 1871, a new offer was made and accepted. In 1895, R&D successor Southern Railway negotiated a 99-year lease for the NC RR.
- North-Western North Carolina Railroad: A 103.22-mile line from Greensboro to Wilkesboro, North Carolina. The NWNC RR was chartered in 1868 and acquired by the R&D in early 1871. The line was finished in 1873. Purchased by the Southern Railway along with the rest of the R&D system in 1894.
- Richmond, York River and Chesapeake Railroad
- Milton and Sutherlin Railroad
- State University Railroad
- Atlanta and Charlotte Air Line Railway
- Charlotte, Columbia and Augusta Railroad
- Atlantic, Tennessee and Ohio Railroad
- Danville, Mocksville, and Southwestern Railroad
- Chester and Lenoir Narrow Gauge Railroad
- Asheville and Spartanburg Railroad
- Western North Carolina Railroad
- Statesville and Western Railroad
- Oxford and Henderson Railroad
- Oxford and Clarksville Railroad
- Danville and Western Railroad
- High Point, Randleman, Asheboro and Southern Railroad
- North Carolina Midland Railroad
- Atlantic and Danville Railway
- Yadkin Valley Railroad

== Maps ==
- "Map of the Richmond & Danville Railroad System in Virginia, North Carolina, South Carolina, Georgia, Tennessee, Alabama, Mississippi, Arkansas & Texas". New York: G.W. & R.B. Colton & Co. 1881. in "American Memory". Library of Congress.
- "Map of the Richmond and Danville Railroad (Piedmont Air-Line) and Connections". Western North Carolina R.R. Scenery: "Land of the Sky". Portland, Maine: Chisholm Bros. c. 1880. p. 13. at D. H.Ramsey Library, Special Collections, University of North Carolina at Asheville 28804

== See also ==
- Confederate railroads in the American Civil War
- The song The Night They Drove Old Dixie Down, by North American rock group The Band, is a fictional narrative by a Confederate soldier who "served on the Danville Train" during the Civil War, and describes the tracks being torn up by General Stoneman's cavalry.
- Railway accident on the Bostian Bridge, a bridge on which a trespasser was fatally hit by a train on the 119th anniversary of a previous accident.
