= Tightsqueeze, Virginia =

Unincorporated community in Virginia, United States

Coordinates: 36°46′52.2″N 79°23′49.4″W

Tightsqueeze is an unincorporated community in the center of Pittsylvania County, Virginia, United States. It is included in the Danville, Virginia metropolitan area.

== History ==
The community of Tightsqueeze got its name due to the construction of two buildings close to a road that connected Chatham and Danville during the 19th century. In 1870, W. H. Colbert built his general store close enough to the road that women could go straight from their carriages to the store without getting muddy or dusty.

Soon, another merchant, Isaiah Giles, built a blacksmith-wheelwright shop directly across the road from the general store. It, too, was on the road's edge. Due to the closeness of the two buildings, buggies and wagons had to slow down as they passed between the two buildings. Thus, individuals were told to slow down for the "tight squeeze" where the two stores were located.

As related by Virginia journalist Guy Friddell in his book What Is It About Virginia?, at one point, the Pittsylvania County Board of Supervisors changed the name of Tightsqueeze to "Fairview." However, after public protest, the name of Tightsqueeze was restored. It has frequently been noted on lists of unusual place names.
