= Mount Hermon, Virginia =

Mount Hermon
- census-designated place
- Location of Mount Hermon within the state of Virginia
- Coordinates: 36°40′42″N 79°25′20″W
- Country: United States
- State: Virginia
- County: Pittsylvania

Population (2020)
  - Total: 4,057
- ZIP code: 53944

Mount Hermon is a census-designated place (CDP) in Pittsylvania County, Virginia, United States. As of the 2020 census, Mount Hermon had a population of 4,057.

Mount Hermon is located approximately three miles northwest of the city limits of Danville.

== Demographics ==
Historical population
Census	Pop.	Note	%±
2010	3,966		—
2020	4,057		2.3%
U.S. Decennial Census; 2010 2020

Mount Hermon was first listed as a census designated place in the 2010 U.S. census.

=== 2020 census ===
As of the 2020 census, Mount Hermon had a population of 4,057. The median age was 47.4 years. 20.6% of residents were under the age of 18 and 23.4% of residents were 65 years of age or older. For every 100 females there were 88.1 males, and for every 100 females age 18 and over there were 85.6 males age 18 and over.

89.7% of residents lived in urban areas, while 10.3% lived in rural areas.

There were 1,651 households in Mount Hermon, of which 30.4% had children under the age of 18 living in them. Of all households, 61.3% were married-couple households, 14.2% were households with a male householder and no spouse or partner present, and 21.0% were households with a female householder and no spouse or partner present. About 23.3% of all households were made up of individuals and 11.7% had someone living alone who was 65 years of age or older.

There were 1,717 housing units, of which 3.8% were vacant. The homeowner vacancy rate was 0.1% and the rental vacancy rate was 9.5%.

Racial composition as of the 2020 census
Race	Number	Percent
White	3,368	83.0%
Black or African American	459	11.3%
American Indian and Alaska Native	11	0.3%
Asian	69	1.7%
Native Hawaiian and Other Pacific Islander	4	0.1%
Some other race	31	0.8%
Two or more races	115	2.8%
Hispanic or Latino (of any race)	79	1.9%
