= Sonans, Virginia =

Unincorporated community in Virginia, US

Coordinates: 36°53′10″N 79°19′02″W

Sonans is an unincorporated community in Pittsylvania County, in the U.S. state of Virginia.
