= John H. Inman =

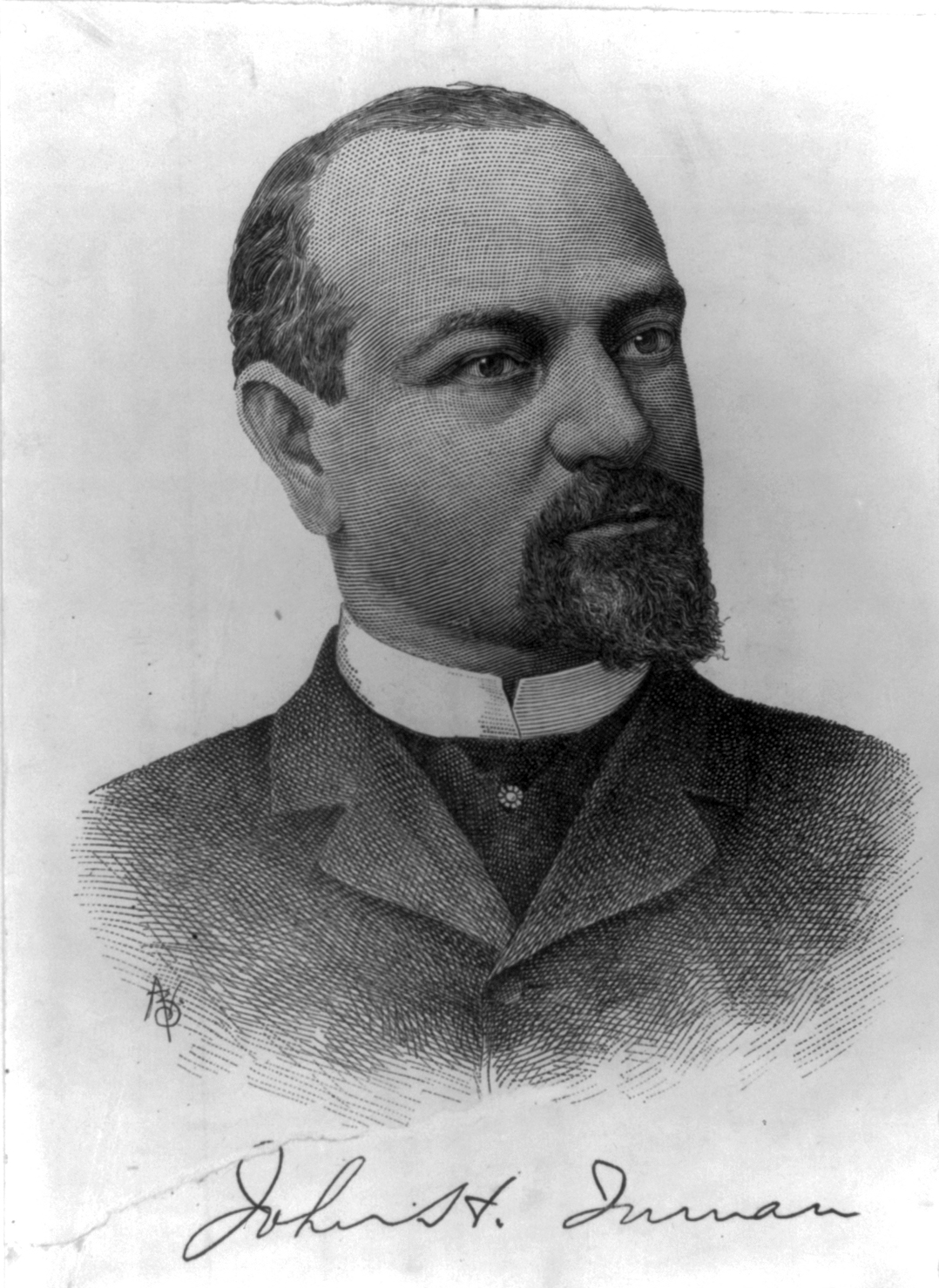
- Born: John Hamilton Inman; 23 October 1844
- Died: 5 November 1896 (aged 52)

John Hamilton Inman (23 October 1844 – 5 November 1896) was an American capitalist who invested in cotton, coal, iron and steel, and railroads, especially in the impoverished American South during the Reconstruction Era. While he is remembered as a tycoon in the age of laissez-faire, cut-throat capitalism, he nevertheless helped the economic development of his native state and the South in general.

== Early years ==
John H. Inman was a member of one of the best-known families in Tennessee. His father was a merchant in the village of Dandridge, and owned a plantation nearby. The Inman children received a good common school education. John H. Inman supplemented his English education by reading extensively. He left school at fifteen years of age, and became a clerk in a Georgia bank of which his uncle was president. He proved so intelligent and efficient that within a year he was promoted to the position of assistant cashier. At the beginning of the Civil War he enlisted in the Confederate army although he was not yet eighteen years old. His father and relatives were impoverished by the war, and in September 1865, he went to New York City to seek his fortune. He obtained employment in a cotton house and was admitted to full partnership in the firm in 1868. In 1871 he founded the house of Inman, Swann and Co., in which he associated himself with his former partners. The business grew rapidly, and in a few years he amassed a fortune of several million dollars in the cotton trade, that came to be centered in New York City largely through his activity.

== Southern resources ==
Inman made a careful study of Southern resources and wants, and determined to do what he could for the development of the South. In association with other businesspeople who relied on his judgment, he invested over $5 million in the enterprises of the Tennessee Coal, Iron and Railroad Company, including the bituminous coal mines at Birmingham, Alabama, the blast furnaces in that city, and Bessemer Steel Works at Ensley City, near there. He induced the investment of over $100,000,000 in Southern enterprises, and became a director in companies that possessed more than 10,000 miles of railroad.

In 1883 Inman directed his attention to Southern railroads. He became a director in the East Tennessee. Virginia and Georgia system, the Louisville and Nashville Railroad, the Richmond and Danville Railroad, and the Nashville, Chattanooga and St. Louis Railway.

Inman was a director in the Fourth National Bank in New York, and took so much interest in its prosperity that he refused a directorship in a prominent railroad company because a clause in the latter's charter made it impossible for a director of the company to also be director of a National Bank. Inman said, in declining, that he would rather part with all railroad interests than to sever connection with the Board of Directors of the Fourth National Bank.

Among Southern enterprises Inman was largely interested in the organization of the Southern Iron Company, controlling the charcoal iron industry of the South. This concern brought about the manufacture of steel at the Chattanooga plant. He also owned a big tract of coal land in the Sequatchie Valley of Tennessee, one of the large centers of coal and iron interests below the Ohio River.

Since 1886 Inman invested in the Richmond Terminal system of railroads and was chosen President in 1889. He was one of a few owners of the South Atlantic and Ohio Railroad, running from Bristol, Tennessee to Big Stone Gap, Virginia. For many years, Inman competed for control of the Tennessee Railroad Company with New York Republican boss Thomas C. Platt, who was represented between 1898 and 1891 by Company Chief Superintendent Judge Hiram Bond of New York, but Inman was ultimately successful. Among other corporations in which Inman was a director were the American Cotton Oil Company, the Home Insurance Company, Royal Insurance Company of Liverpool, the American Pig Iron Storage Warrant Company, the American Surety Company, and the Liberty Insurance Company.

Inman was appointed a New York City Rapid Transit Commissioner in 1891 and held the office until his death. He was one of the committee of five to provide a plan to secure the necessary financial aid for the World's Fair at the time New York was endeavoring to secure that exposition. The other members of the committee were J. Pierpont Morgan, August Belmont, Samuel Babcock, and Cornelius Vanderbilt.

== Personal life ==
Inman was married on 8 June 1870, to Margaret M. Coffin of Sweetwater, Monroe County, Tennessee, a granddaughter of Dr. Charles Coffin, the founder and for years the President of Greenville College. Together, they had six children and lived in New York City. He died on 5 November 1896 in his country house in Berkshire, Massachusetts.
