= List of Virginia railroads =

The following railroads operate(d) in the U.S. state of Virginia.

== Common freight carriers ==
- Buckingham Branch Railroad (BB)
- Canadian Pacific Railway (CP) through subsidiary Delaware and Hudson Railway (DH) (trackage rights, not used)
- Chesapeake and Albemarle Railroad (CA)
- Commonwealth Railway (CWRY)
- CSX Transportation (CSXT)
- Delmarva Central Railroad (DCR)
- Durbin and Greenbrier Valley Railroad (DGVR) operates Shenandoah Valley Railroad (SV)
- North Carolina and Virginia Railroad (NCVA)
- Norfolk and Portsmouth Belt Line Railroad (NPB)
- Norfolk Southern Railway (NS)

== Passenger carriers ==
- Amtrak (AMTK)
- Busch Gardens Railway (located in Busch Gardens Williamsburg)
- The Tide
- Virginia Railway Express
- Washington Metro

== Private carriers ==
- Fort Eustis Military Railroad (USAX)
- Newport News Shipbuilding & Dry Dock Company (NNSX)
- Norfolk Naval Shipyard (USNX)

== Defunct railroads ==
Note: railroads that existed only in present-day West Virginia before 1863 are not listed.

Name	Mark	System (Note: This is one or more of the Class I railroads that the railroad became part of, if any.)	From	To	Successor	Notes
Abingdon Coal and Iron Railroad		N&W	1887	1894	Virginia Western Coal and Iron Railway	
Alberene Railroad		C&O	1895	1902	Chesapeake and Ohio Railway	
Alexandria and Fredericksburg Railway		RF&P	1864	1890	Washington Southern Railway	
Alexandria, Loudoun and Hampshire Railroad		SOU	1853	1870	Washington and Ohio Railroad	
Alexandria and Harper's Ferry Railroad		SOU	1847	1853	Alexandria, Loudoun and Hampshire Railroad	
Alexandria and Washington Railroad		RF&P	1854	1887	Alexandria and Washington Railway	
Alexandria and Washington Railway		RF&P	1887	1890	Washington Southern Railway	
Appomattox Railroad		N&W	1847	1854	Southside Railroad	
Atlantic Coast Line Railroad	ACL	ACL	1898	1967	Seaboard Coast Line Railroad	
Atlantic and Danville Railway	AD	N&W	1882	1962	Norfolk, Franklin and Danville Railway	
Atlantic, Mississippi and Ohio Railroad		N&W	1870	1881	Norfolk and Western Railroad	
Baltimore and Ohio Railroad	B&O, BO	B&O	1867	1987	Chesapeake and Ohio Railway	
Baltimore and Potomac Railroad		PRR	1890	1891	Philadelphia, Wilmington and Baltimore Railroad	
Bay Coast Railroad	BCR		2006	2018	Delmarva Central Railroad	
Beaver Dam Railroad			1910			
Big Sandy Railway		C&O	1902	1906	Chesapeake and Ohio Railway of Kentucky	
Big Sandy and Cumberland Railroad	BS&C	N&W	1900	1932	Norfolk and Western Railway	
Big Stone Gap and Powell's Valley Railroad			1912			
Big Stone Gap and Powell's Valley Railway			1892	1912	Big Stone Gap and Powell's Valley Railroad	
Big Stony Railway		N&W	1892	1915	Norfolk and Western Railway	
Black Mountain Railway		SOU	1903	1908	Virginia and Southwestern Railway	
Blackstone and Lunenburg Railroad		N&W	1905	1910	Norfolk and Western Railway	
Blackstone and Southern Railroad		N&W	1900	1905	Blackstone and Lunenburg Railroad	
Blue Ridge Railroad		C&O	1849	1870	Chesapeake and Ohio Railroad	
Brighthope Railway			1877	1889	Farmville and Powhatan Railroad	
Bristol Coal and Iron Narrow-Gauge Railroad		SOU	1876	1882	South Atlantic and Ohio Railroad	
Buchanan and Clifton Forge Railway		C&O	1876	1880	Richmond and Alleghany Railroad	
Buckingham Railroad		C&O	1879	1897	Chesapeake and Ohio Railway	
Cape Charles Railroad		PRR	1906	1918	New York, Philadelphia and Norfolk Railroad	
Carolina, Clinchfield and Ohio Railway	CC&O	ACL/ L&N	1908	1990	CSX Transportation	
Carolina and Northwestern Railway	CRN	SOU	1982	1988	Southern Railway	
Carolina and Northwestern Railway	CR&N	SOU	1951	1974	Norfolk Southern Railway	
Catawba Valley Railway and Mining Company		N&W	1902	1909	Norfolk and Western Railway	
Charleston, Cincinnati and Chicago Railroad		ACL/ L&N	1887	1893	Ohio River and Charleston Railroad	
Charlottesville and Rapidan Railroad		SOU	1876	1914	Southern Railway	
Chesapeake and Ohio Railroad		C&O	1868	1878	Chesapeake and Ohio Railway	
Chesapeake and Ohio Railway	C&O, CO	C&O	1878	1987	CSX Transportation	
Chesapeake and Ohio Railway of Kentucky		C&O	1906	1907	Chesapeake and Ohio Railway	
Chesapeake, Shendun and Western Railroad		N&W	1892	1895	Chesapeake and Western Railroad	
Chesapeake and Western Railroad		N&W	1895	1943	Chesapeake Western Railway	
Chesterfield Railroad			1828	1851	N/A	
Chowan and Southern Railroad		ACL	1887	1889	Norfolk and Carolina Railroad	
City Point Railroad		N&W	1836	1847	Appomattox Railroad	
Clarksville and North Carolina Railroad		SOU	1887	1894	Southern Railway	
Clinch Valley Railroad		N&W	1887	1887	Norfolk and Western Railroad	
Clinchfield Railroad	CRR	ACL/ L&N	1924	1983	Seaboard System Railroad	
Clinchfield Northern Railway		ACL/ L&N	1911	1912	Carolina, Clinchfield and Ohio Railway	
Clover Hill Railroad			1841	1877	Brighthope Railway	
Consolidated Rail Corporation	CR		1976	1999	Norfolk Southern Railway	
Covington and Ohio Railroad		C&O	1853	1868	Chesapeake and Ohio Railroad	
Cumberland Valley Railroad		PRR	1890	1919	PRR	Leased the Cumberland Valley and Martinsburg Railroad
Cumberland Valley and Martinsburg Railroad		PRR	1889	1958	Penndel Company	
Danville, Mocksville and Southwestern Railroad		SOU	1880	1899	Danville and Western Railway	
Danville and New River Railroad		SOU	1873	1890	Danville and Western Railway	
Danville and Seaboard Railroad		NS	1887	1891	Norfolk, Albemarle and Atlantic Railroad	
Danville and Western Railway	D&W	SOU	1891			
Delaware, Maryland and Virginia Railroad		PRR	1883	1956	Philadelphia, Baltimore and Washington Railroad	
Dismal Swamp Railroad			1896	1941	N/A	
East River Railroad		N&W	1881	1882	Norfolk and Western Railroad	
Eastern Shore Railroad	ESHR		1981	2006	Bay Coast Railroad	
Eastern Shore Railroad		PRR	1867	1878	Peninsula Railroad	
Elizabeth City and Norfolk Railroad		NS	1875	1883	Norfolk Southern Railroad	
Elizabeth River Railroad			1901	1910	Norfolk and Portsmouth Belt Line Railroad	
Elkhorn Southern Railway		ACL/ L&N	1906	1911	Carolina, Clinchfield and Ohio Railway, Clinchfield Northern Railway	
Farmville and Powhatan Railroad			1884	1905	Tidewater and Western Railroad	
Franklin and Carolina Railroad			1945	1958	Atlantic Coast Line Railroad	
Franklin and Pittsylvania Railroad			1878	1932	N/A	
Fredericksburg and Gordonsville Railroad			1853	1876	Potomac, Fredericksburg and Piedmont Railroad	
Fredericksburg, Orange and Charlottesville Railroad			1872	1873	Fredericksburg and Gordonsville Railroad	
Gladeville Railroad			1892	1902	Virginia and Kentucky Railway	
Greensville and Roanoke Railroad		ACL	1834	1855	Petersburg Railroad	
Haysi Railroad		L&N/ SCL	1969	1983	Seaboard System Railroad	
Henrico Railroad			1882			
Laurel Railway			1906			
Lick Creek and Lake Erie Railroad		ACL/ L&N	1902	1908	Carolina, Clinchfield and Ohio Railway	
Louisa Railroad		C&O	1836	1850	Virginia Central Railroad	
Louisville and Nashville Railroad	L&N, LN	L&N	1887	1983	Seaboard System Railroad	
Lynchburg Belt Line and Connecting Railway		N&W	1907	1910	Norfolk and Western Railway	
Lynchburg and Danville Railroad		SOU	1866	1872	Virginia and North Carolina Railroad	
Lynchburg and Durham Railroad		N&W	1887	1896	Norfolk, Lynchburg and Durham Railroad	
Lynchburg, Halifax and North Carolina Railroad		N&W	1884	1887	Lynchburg and Durham Railroad	
Lynchburg and Tennessee Railroad		N&W	1848	1849	Virginia and Tennessee Railroad	
Manassas Gap Railroad		SOU	1850	1867	Orange, Alexandria and Manassas Railroad	
Marion and Rye Valley Railroad			1891	1900	Marion and Rye Valley Railway	
Marion and Rye Valley Railway			1900	1931	N/A	
Martinsburg and Potomac Railroad		PRR	1870	1890	Cumberland Valley and Martinsburg Railroad	
Meherrin Valley Railroad			1878			
Milton and Sutherlin Railroad			1876	1894	N/A	
Mount Airy and Eastern Railway			1899	1910	Virginia and Mount Airy Railway	
Nansemond Land, Lumber and Narrow Gauge Railway Company		NS	1873	1884	Suffolk and Carolina Railway	
Nelson and Albemarle Railway			1903	1963	N/A	
New River Railroad		N&W	1877	1882	Norfolk and Western Railroad	
New River Railroad, Mining and Manufacturing Company		N&W	1873	1877	New River Railroad	
New River, Holston and Western Railroad	NH&W	N&W	1900	1919	Norfolk and Western Railway	
New River Plateau Railway		N&W	1888	1889	Norfolk and Western Railroad	
New York and Norfolk Railroad		PRR	1872	1878	Peninsula Railroad	
New York, Philadelphia and Norfolk Railroad		PRR	1882	1958	Penndel Company	
Norfolk, Albemarle and Atlantic Railroad		NS	1891	1896	Norfolk, Virginia Beach and Southern Railroad	
Norfolk and Carolina Railroad		ACL	1889	1900	Atlantic Coast Line Railroad	
Norfolk, Franklin and Danville Railway	NFD	N&W	1962	1983	Norfolk and Western Railway	
Norfolk, Lynchburg and Durham Railroad		N&W	1896	1896	Norfolk and Western Railroad	
Norfolk and Petersburg Railroad		N&W	1851	1871	Atlantic, Mississippi and Ohio Railroad	
Norfolk, Roanoke and Southern Railroad		N&W	1896	1896	Norfolk and Western Railroad	
Norfolk and Sewalls Point Railroad		NS	1872	1882	Norfolk and Virginia Beach Railroad and Improvement Company	
Norfolk Southern Railroad	NS	NS	1910	1942	Norfolk Southern Railway	
Norfolk Southern Railroad		NS	1883	1891	Norfolk and Southern Railroad	
Norfolk Southern Railway	NS	NS	1942	1982	Carolina and Northwestern Railway	
Norfolk and Southern Railroad		NS	1891	1906	Norfolk and Southern Railway	
Norfolk and Southern Railway		NS	1906	1910	Norfolk Southern Railroad	
Norfolk Terminal Company		N&W	1882	1889	Norfolk and Western Railroad	
Norfolk Terminal Railway		NS/ N&W	1910			
Norfolk Terminal and Transportation Company		C&O	1896	1945	Chesapeake and Ohio Railway	
Norfolk and Virginia Beach Railroad		NS	1887	1891	Norfolk, Albemarle and Atlantic Railroad	
Norfolk and Virginia Beach Railroad and Improvement Company		NS	1882	1887	Norfolk and Virginia Beach Railroad	
Norfolk, Virginia Beach and Southern Railroad		NS	1896	1900	Norfolk and Southern Railroad	
Norfolk and Western Railroad		N&W	1881	1896	Norfolk and Western Railway	
Norfolk and Western Railway	N&W, NW	N&W	1896	1998	Norfolk Southern Railway	
Norfolk Wharf, Warehouse and Terminal Company		C&O	1893	1896	Norfolk Terminal and Transportation Company	
North and South Railroad		PRR	1853	1878	Peninsula Railroad	
Norton and Northern Railway			1916	1934	N/A	
Ohio River and Charleston Railroad		ACL/ L&N	1894	1894	Ohio River and Charleston Railway	
Ohio River and Charleston Railway		ACL/ L&N	1894	1902	South and Western Railway	
Orange and Alexandria Railroad		SOU	1848	1867	Orange, Alexandria and Manassas Railroad	
Orange, Alexandria and Manassas Railroad		SOU	1867	1872	Virginia and North Carolina Railroad	
Orange and Fredericksburg Railroad			1925	1926	Virginia Central Railway	
Peninsula Railroad		PRR	1878	1882	New York, Philadelphia and Norfolk Railroad	
Penn Central Transportation Company	PC		1968	1976	Consolidated Rail Corporation	
Penndel Company		PRR	1958	1976	Consolidated Rail Corporation	
Pennsylvania Railroad	PRR	PRR	1918	1968	Penn Central Transportation Company	
Petersburg and Lynchburg Railroad						
Petersburg Railroad		ACL	1830	1898	Atlantic Coast Line Railroad	
Petersburg and Asylum Railway		ACL	1888	1896	Petersburg and Western Railroad	
Petersburg and Western Railroad		ACL	1896	1898	Petersburg Railroad	
Philadelphia, Baltimore and Washington Railroad		PRR	1902	1918	Pennsylvania Railroad	
Philadelphia, Wilmington and Baltimore Railroad		PRR	1891	1902	Philadelphia, Baltimore and Washington Railroad	
Piedmont Railroad		SOU	1862	1894	Southern Railway	
Pocahontas and Western Railroad		N&W	1904	1910	Norfolk and Western Railway	
Portsmouth and Roanoke Railroad		SAL	1832	1846	Seaboard and Roanoke Railroad	
Potomac Railroad		RF&P	1867	1917	Richmond, Fredericksburg and Potomac Railroad	
Potomac, Fredericksburg and Piedmont Railroad			1876	1925	Orange and Fredericksburg Railroad	
Prince George and Chesterfield Railway		SAL	1929	1946	Seaboard Air Line Railroad	
Radford-Southern Railroad and Mining Company		N&W	1898	1903	Norfolk and Western Railway	
Richmond and Alleghany Railroad		C&O	1878	1889	Richmond and Alleghany Railway	
Richmond and Alleghany Railway		C&O	1889	1890	Chesapeake and Ohio Railway	
Richmond and Danville Railroad		SOU	1847	1894	Southern Railway	
Richmond, Fredericksburg and Potomac Railroad	RF&P, RFP	RF&P	1834	1991	Richmond, Fredericksburg and Potomac Railway	
Richmond, Fredericksburg and Potomac Railway	RFP		1991			Still exists as a subsidiary of CSX Transportation
Richmond, Fredericksburg and Potomac and Richmond and Petersburg Railroad Connection Company		RF&P	1866	1919	N/A (operated by Richmond, Fredericksburg and Potomac Railroad)	
Richmond and Lynchburg Railroad		C&O	1860	1873	Straight-Shoot Railroad	
Richmond and Mecklenburg Railroad		SOU	1875	1950	Southern Railway	
Richmond and Petersburg Railroad		ACL	1836	1898	Atlantic Coast Line Railroad	
Richmond, Petersburg and Carolina Railroad		SAL	1892	1900	Seaboard Air Line Railway	
Richmond Terminal Railway		ACL/ RF&P	1916	1976	N/A	
Richmond and York River Railroad		SOU	1853	1873	Richmond, York River and Chesapeake Railroad	
Richmond, York River and Chesapeake Railroad		SOU	1873	1894	Southern Railway	
Roanoke and Southern Railway		N&W	1887	1896	Norfolk, Roanoke and Southern Railroad	
Roanoke Valley Railroad		SOU	1850	1880	Richmond and Mecklenburg Railroad	
Roaring Fork Railroad			1904			
Rockbridge Alum and Goshen Railroad			1889			
Rosslyn Connecting Railroad	RC	PRR	1904	1969	Penndel Company	
Seaboard Air Line Railroad	SAL	SAL	1946	1967	Seaboard Coast Line Railroad	
Seaboard Air Line Railway		SAL	1900	1945	Seaboard Air Line Railroad	
Seaboard Air Line System		SAL	1893	1900	Seaboard Air Line Railway	
Seaboard Coast Line Railroad	SCL		1967	1983	Seaboard System Railroad	
Seaboard and Roanoke Railroad		SAL	1846	1911	Seaboard Air Line Railway	
Seaboard System Railroad	SBD		1983	1986	CSX Transportation	
Shenandoah Valley Railroad		N&W	1867	1890	Shenandoah Valley Railway	
Shenandoah Valley Railway		N&W	1890	1890	Norfolk and Western Railroad	
South Atlantic and Ohio Railroad		SOU	1882	1898	Virginia and Southwestern Railway	
South and Western Railroad		ACL/ L&N	1905	1908	Carolina, Clinchfield and Ohio Railway	
South and Western Railway		ACL/ L&N	1902	1906	South and Western Railroad	
Southeastern and Atlantic Railroad			1896	1898	Norfolk and Portsmouth Belt Line Railroad	
Southern Railway	SOU	SOU	1894	1990	Norfolk Southern Railway	
Southside Railroad		N&W	1846	1871	Atlantic, Mississippi and Ohio Railroad	
Straight-Shoot Railroad		C&O	1873	1878	Richmond and Alleghany Railroad	
Suffolk and Carolina Railway		NS	1884	1906	Norfolk and Southern Railway	
Sulphur Mines Railroad		C&O	1884			
Surry, Sussex and Southampton Railway			1886	1930	N/A	
Tidewater Railway		N&W	1904	1907	Virginian Railway	
Tidewater and West Virginia Railroad		N&W	1900	1901	Chesapeake Western Railway	
Tidewater and Western Railroad			1905	1917	N/A	
Tuckahoe and James River Railroad			1837			
Valley Railroad		B&O	1866			
Valley Street Railway			1890	1892	Big Stone Gap and Powell's Valley Railway	
Virginia Air Line Railway		C&O	1906	1912	Chesapeake and Ohio Railway	
Virginia Anthracite Coal and Railway Company		N&W	1902	1911	Norfolk and Western Railway	
Virginia Blue Ridge Railway	VBR		1914	1980	N/A	
Virginia and Carolina Railroad		SAL	1882	1892	Richmond, Petersburg and Carolina Railroad	
Virginia–Carolina Railway		N&W	1898	1919	Norfolk and Western Railway	
Virginia and Carolina Coast Railroad		NS	1905	1906	Norfolk and Southern Railway	
Virginia–Carolina and Southern Railway		N&W	1906	1912	Virginia–Carolina Railway	
Virginia Central Railroad		C&O	1850	1868	Chesapeake and Ohio Railroad	
Virginia Central Railway	VC		1926	1983	N/A	
Virginia and Kentucky Railroad		SOU	1852	1876	Bristol Coal and Iron Narrow-Gauge Railroad	
Virginia and Kentucky Railway			1902	1916	Norton and Northern Railway	
Virginia and Maryland Railroad	VAMD		1977	1981	Eastern Shore Railroad	
Virginia Midland Railway		SOU	1880	1898	Southern Railway	
Virginia and Mount Airy Railway			1920		N/A	Never operated
Virginia and North Carolina Railroad		SOU	1872	1873	Washington City, Virginia Midland and Great Southern Railway	
Virginia and Potts Creek Railroad		N&W	1906	1910	Big Stony Railway	
Virginia and Southeastern Railway		SOU	1904	1908	Virginia and Southwestern Railway	
Virginia Southern Railroad			1902	1931	N/A	
Virginia and Southwestern Railway		SOU	1899			Still exists as a lessor of the Norfolk Southern Railway
Virginia and Tennessee Railroad		N&W	1849	1871	Atlantic, Mississippi and Ohio Railroad	
Virginia Western Coal and Iron Railway		N&W	1894	1898	Virginia–Carolina Railway	
Virginian Railway	VGN	N&W	1907	1959	Norfolk and Western Railway	
Virginian Terminal Railway		N&W	1907	1936	Virginian Railway	
Washington, Alexandria and Georgetown Railroad		RF&P	1862	1868	Alexandria and Washington Railroad	
Washington City, Virginia Midland and Great Southern Railway		SOU	1873	1880	Virginia Midland Railway	
Washington and Ohio Railroad		SOU	1870	1882	Washington and Western Railroad	
Washington, Ohio and Western Railroad		SOU	1883	1894	Southern Railway	
Washington Southern Railway	WSN	RF&P	1890	1920	Richmond, Fredericksburg and Potomac Railroad	
Washington and Western Railroad		N&W	1889	1890	Shenandoah Valley Railway	
Washington and Western Railroad		SOU	1882	1883	Washington, Ohio and Western Railroad	
Western Branch Railway		ACL	1888	1888	Chowan and Southern Railroad	
White Top Railway			1913			
Winchester Railroad			1929	1929	Winchester and Wardensville Railroad	
Winchester and Potomac Railroad		B&O	1831	1987	CSX Transportation	
Winchester and Strasburg Railroad		B&O	1867	1987	CSX Transportation	
Winchester and Wardensville Railroad			1929	1941	Winchester and Western Railroad	
Winchester and Western Railroad			1916	1930	Winchester and Wardensville Railroad	
Wise Terminal Company		SOU	1900	1913	Interstate Railroad	
Worcester Railroad		PRR	1876	1883	Delaware, Maryland and Virginia Railroad	

Electric

- Appalachian Power Company
- Alexandria, Barcroft and Washington Transit Company
- Blue Ridge Light and Power Company
- Charlottesville and Albemarle Railway
- Chesapeake Transit Company
- Citizens Railway, Light and Power Company
- Danville Traction and Power Company
- Great Falls and Old Dominion Railroad
- Hampton Roads Traction Company
- Lynchburg Traction and Light Company
- Mill Mountain Incline
- Mount Vernon, Alexandria and Washington Railway
- Newport News and Old Point Railway and Electric Company
- Norfolk Railway and Light Company
- Norfolk City and Suburban Railway
- Norfolk and Ocean View Railroad and Hotel Company
- Norfolk and Ocean View Railway
- Norfolk Southern Railroad
- Norfolk and Southern Railroad
- Norfolk Street Railroad
- Radford Water Power Company
- Richmond and Chesapeake Bay Railway
- Richmond and Henrico Railway
- Richmond and Rappahannock River Railway
- Richmond-Ashland Railway
- Richmond-Petersburg Interurban Electric Railway
- Roanoke Railway and Electric Company
- Schuyler Railway
- Tazewell Railway and Light Company

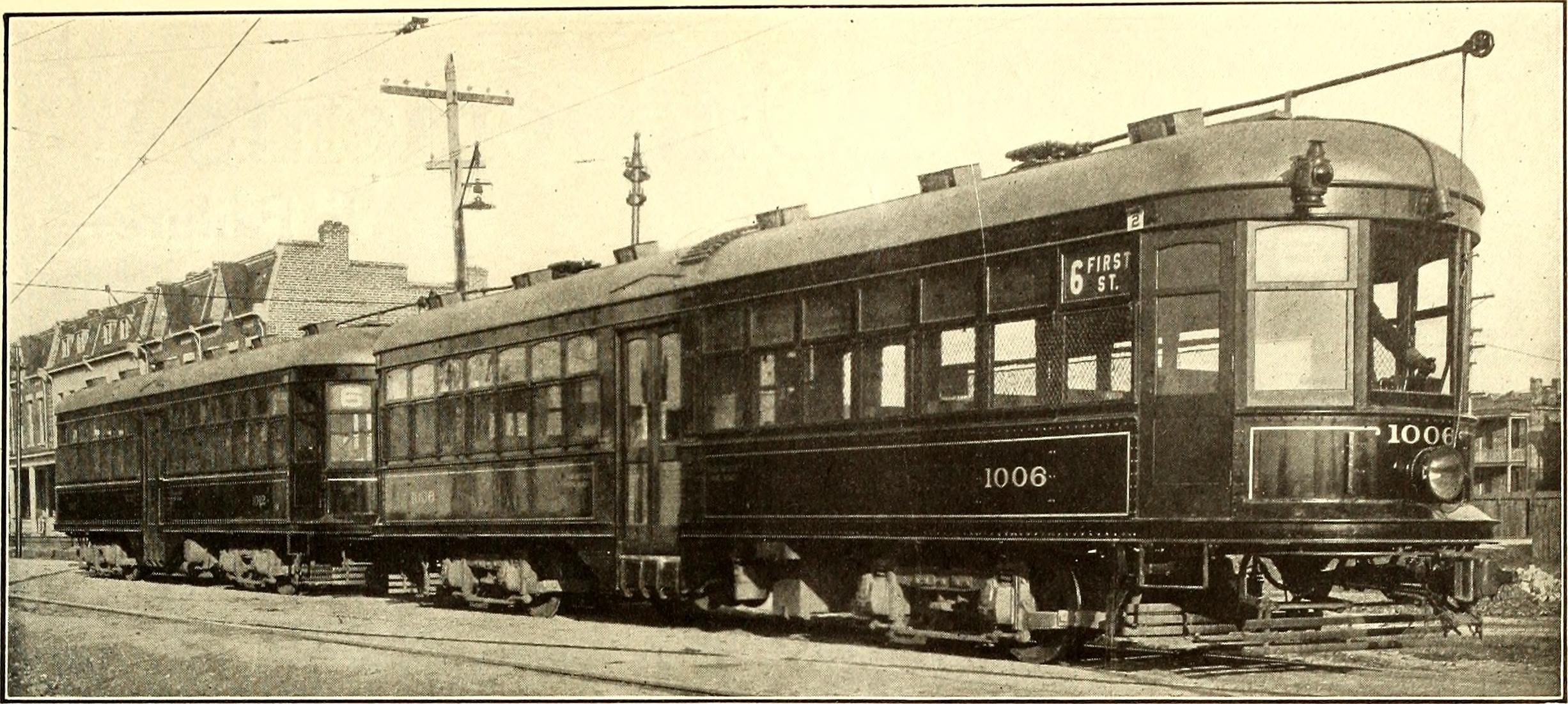
Virginia Railway & Power Company in Richmond, 1914

- Virginia Railway and Power Company
- Washington, Alexandria and Mount Vernon Railway
- Washington and Old Dominion Railroad
- Washington and Old Dominion Railway
- Washington Utilities Company
- Washington-Virginia Railway

Private carriers

- Centreville Military Railroad
- Lorton and Occoquan Railroad
- Suffolk Lumber Company's Railroad
- United States Military Railroad

== See also ==
- List of railroad lines in the Delmarva Peninsula
