= Valley Railroad =

Valley Railroad may refer to:

- Connecticut Valley Railroad, 1868–1887, a defunct railroad in the US
- Valley Railroad (Connecticut), a heritage railroad
- Valley Railroad (New York), 1869–1945, predecessor of the Delaware, Lackawanna and Western Railroad
- Valley Railroad (Virginia), a Virginia railroad, predecessor of the Baltimore and Ohio Railroad
- Valley Railway, a former shortline in Ohio

== See also ==
- Valley Rail (disambiguation)
