= Norfolk Southern (disambiguation) =

Norfolk Southern may refer to:

- Norfolk Southern Railway, a railroad operating throughout the Eastern United States
  - Norfolk Southern Railway (1942–1982), a defunct, smaller railroad, now part of the current railroad
- Norfolk Southern Corporation, parent company of the Norfolk Southern Railway
