= Charlottesville and Albemarle Railway =

Electric street railroad in Virginia, US

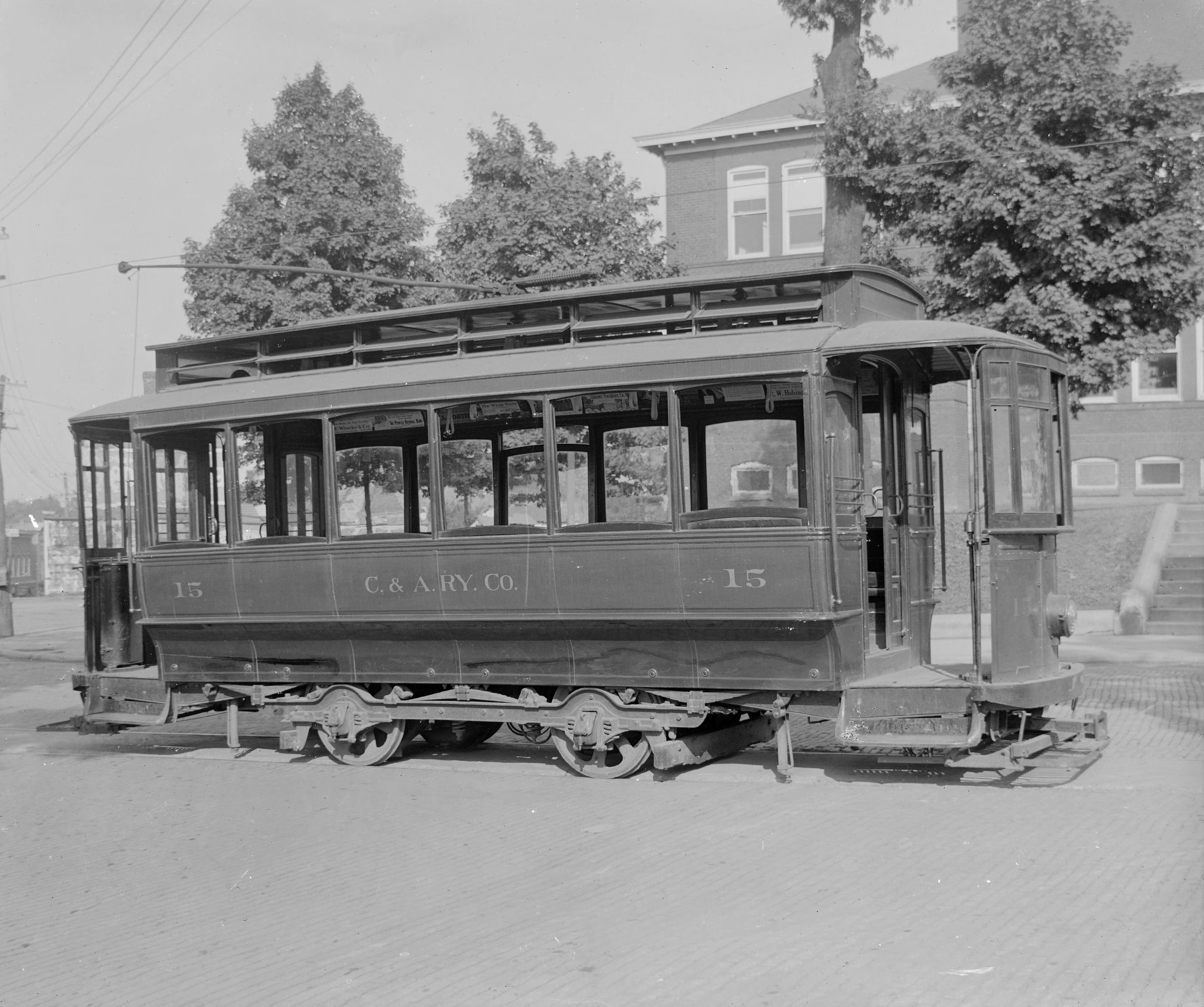
- C&A Railway streetcar #15 in 1918

Overview
- Headquarters: Charlottesville, Virginia
- Locale: Charlottesville, Virginia; Albemarle County, Virginia
- Dates of operation: 1903–1936
- Predecessor: Charlottesville City and Suburban Railway Company
- Successor: Charlottesville and Albemarle Bus Company

Technical
- Track gauge: 4 ft 8 1/2 in (1,435 mm)
- Electrification: 1895
- Length: 3.5 miles (5.6 km)

The Charlottesville and Albemarle Railway (C&A) was a short electric street railroad operating within the city of Charlottesville, Virginia, United States, during the early 20th century. The line was preceded by several streetcar lines operating both horse-drawn and electric powered cars dating back to 1887. After facing financial difficulties, the predecessor lines were reorganized into the C&A in 1903. The C&A's electric streetcars operated off of an overhead line system that was powered by the railroad's own power plant. The C&A also offered electric power generated by its plant to the city of Charlottesville. During the mid-1910s, the line received numerous upgrades, including the construction of a new power plant on the Rivanna River, a new company headquarters building, expansion of track, and the purchase of new streetcars.

Increased expenses and decreasing ridership, coupled with the Great Depression, caused the railway to cease streetcar operations in 1935. The railway was reorganized as the Charlottesville and Albemarle Bus Company in 1936 with a transition to bus service. Today, Charlottesville Area Transit provides bus service to the city of Charlottesville; however, the city has recently investigated the feasibility of a streetcar line following much of the same route as the Charlottesville and Albemarle Railway.

== History ==
=== Background ===
Charlottesville gained its first railroad in 1850, when the Virginia Central Railroad – formerly the Louisa Railroad – arrived as it progressed westward towards the Blue Ridge Mountains. The Orange and Alexandria Railroad, chartered in 1848, entered into a contract in the early 1850s with the Virginia Central to use the Virginia Central's track from Gordonsville to Charlottesville for its extension southward towards Lynchburg. This line began operations to Charlottesville in April 1854. Thus, two major railroads – the Virginia Central in an east-west direction and the Orange and Alexandria in a north-south direction – converged at Charlottesville, ensuring the town's prosperity. In 1868, the Virginia Central was reorganized with the Covington and Ohio Railroad to form the Chesapeake and Ohio Railroad, which was renamed as the Chesapeake and Ohio Railway (C&O) in 1878. After a series of mergers, the Orange and Alexandria Railroad was incorporated into the newly formed Southern Railway in 1894. Charlottesville became a significant junction of the two railroads, with two railroad stations in operation. One was on the C&O line and the second, the Union Station, was just west of the C&O station at the junction between the C&O and Southern railroads.

The first local transit system within Charlottesville was established in 1883 as an omnibus line operating on a regular schedule. This service, which consisted of a large mule- or horse-drawn cart, operated between downtown Charlottesville and the University of Virginia. Fare for the one-way trip cost 10¢ ($3.37 today). This service would soon be replaced by the development of Charlottesville's streetcar system.

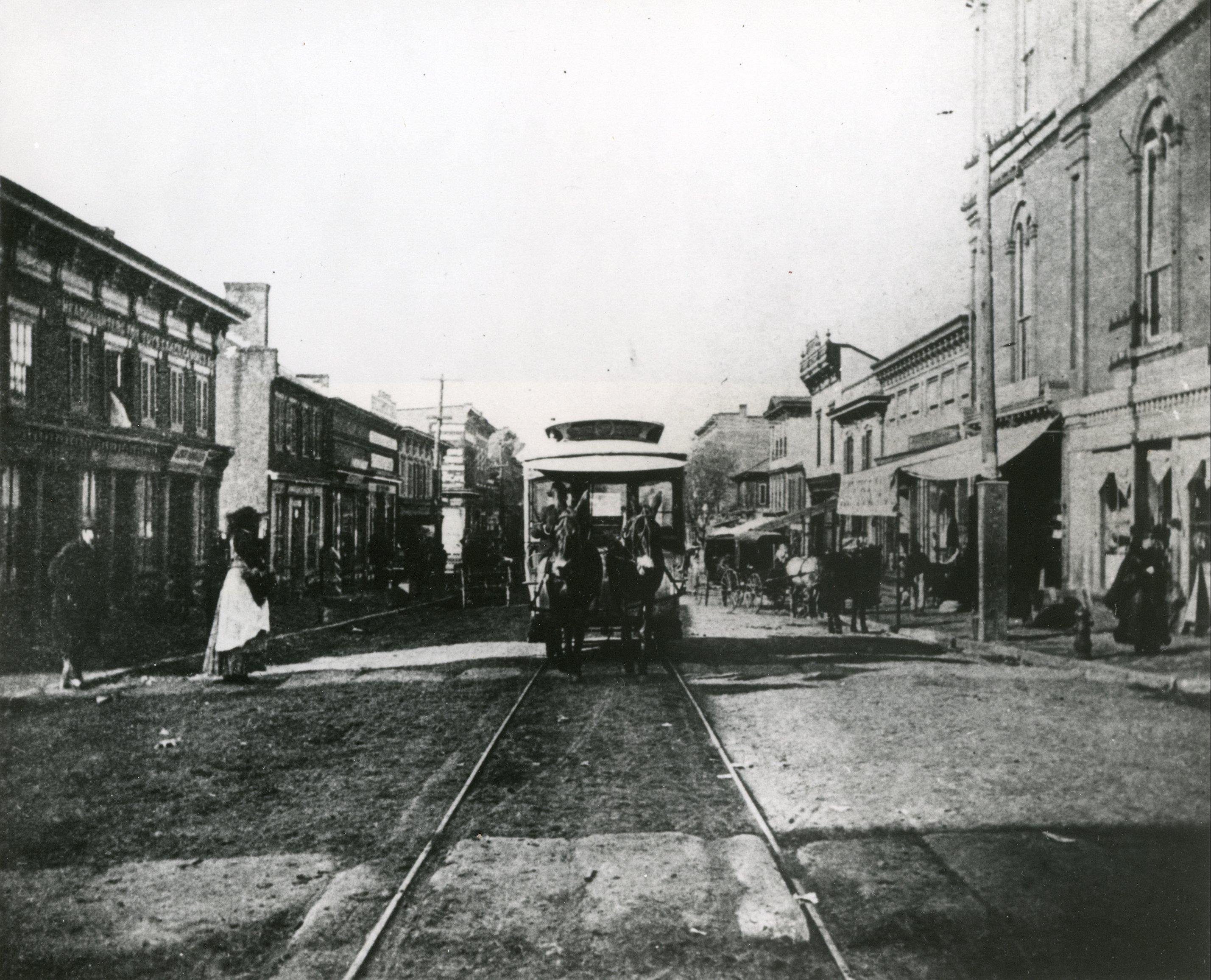
A mule-drawn Charlottesville and University Street Railway car

=== Development of the streetcar system ===
The C&A's earliest predecessor line was chartered by the Virginia General Assembly on March 30, 1887 as the Charlottesville and University Street Railway Company. This line constructed the first horse-drawn streetcar line within Charlottesville and began operation on June 14, 1887. The Piedmont Construction and Improvement Company (renamed as Piedmont Traction Company in January 1896) was incorporated by the General Assembly on March 4, 1890 and began work on an electrified streetcar line. Meanwhile, the Charlottesville and University Street Railway Company – renamed as the Charlottesville City and Suburban Railway in 1895 – continued operation. For a time these two companies operated both horse-drawn and electric streetcars on parallel tracks simultaneously, beginning with the first operation of the electric streetcars on January 12, 1895.

This continued until all of the Piedmont Traction Company's holdings were transferred to the Charlottesville City and Suburban Railway on July 31, 1896, at which time the operation of horse-drawn streetcars ceased. Several other companies, including the Charlottesville and University Electric Light and Gas Company, the Consolidated Ice and Electric Company, and the Jefferson Park Company, were acquired by the Charlottesville City and Suburban Railway around 1900. Having defaulted on six months of payments towards bonds and mortgages, the Charlottesville City and Suburban Railway was sold at public auction on November 10, 1903, after which it was reorganized as the Charlottesville and Albemarle Railway.

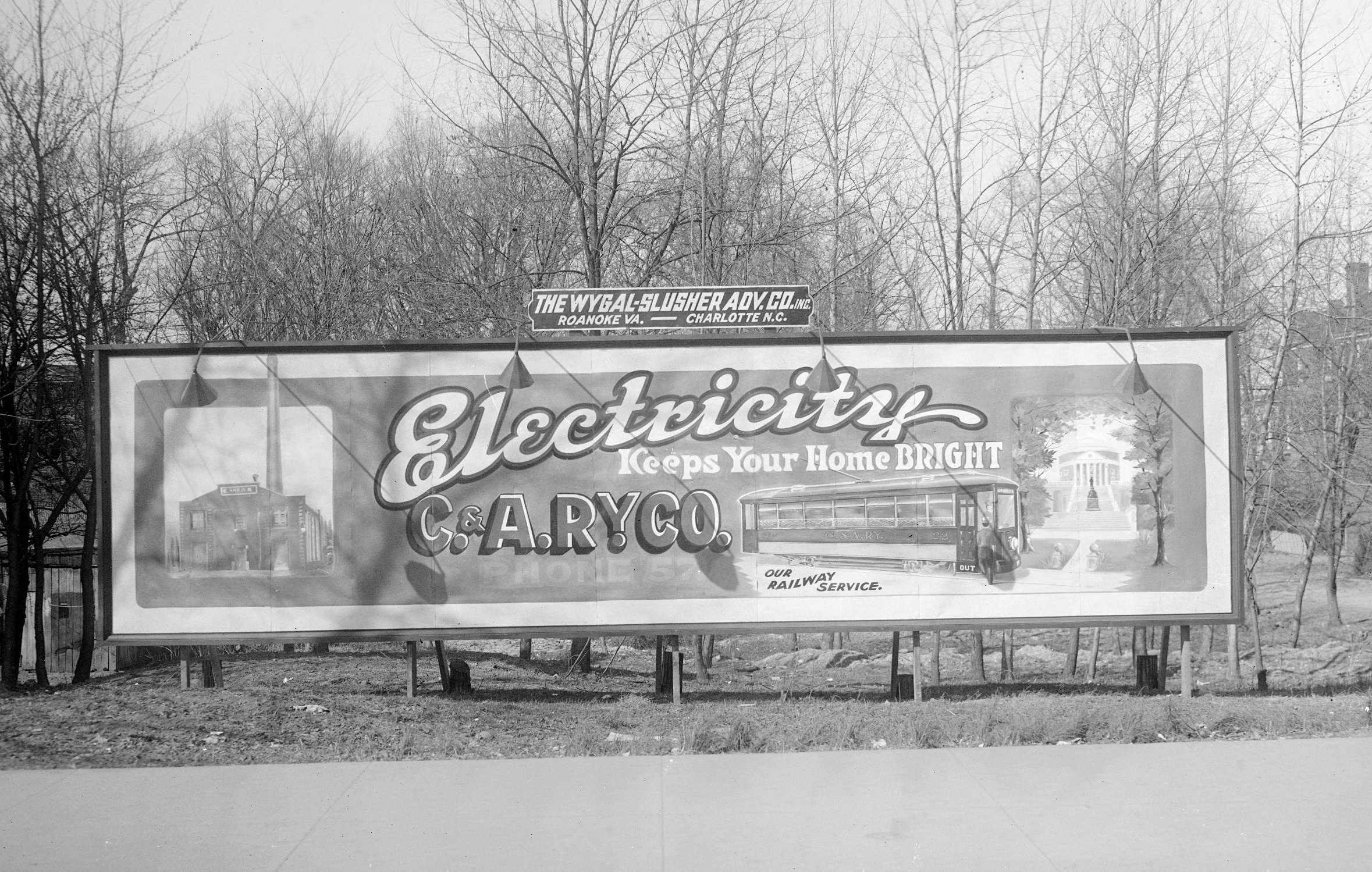
A sign advertising the C&A's electric services. Note the images of the power plant and the Rotunda at the University of Virginia.

=== Expansion, development, and decline ===
After the reorganization of the company as the Charlottesville and Albemarle Railway in 1903, the new railway faced hardship in establishing a profitable business. Charlottesville, as of the 1900 Census, had only a population of 6,449 people and few industries, making the development of an electric power provider and streetcar service difficult. Furthermore, the company's electric power service, at that time using direct current, competed with the municipal gas provider. The C&A's streetcar service was not expansive either, running for only 3 miles (4.8 km) down Main Street from the C&O station west to the University of Virginia with multiple branches. Thus, the C&A's profitability suffered and the railway went further into debt until it was purchased in 1912 by F.C. Todd, Norman James, and John L. Livers. Under the new ownership, the company was revitalized with many improvements including the construction of a new power plant producing alternating current electricity, the purchase of one-man streetcars (operated by one man), and a refocus of the company's power service.

The C&A's 3-mile (4.8 km) track was expanded by 1/2 mile (0.80 km) during this time to reach the University of Virginia's new stadium. The new one-man streetcars required an alteration of the track at each end of the C&A's line to accommodate the turning of the cars. After failing to receive permission from the C&O Railway to construct a loop at the C&O station, the C&A constructed a small turntable; however, this was later replaced by a loop. The C&A also increased the number of Main Street sidings from three to five, thus reducing travel time to five minutes.

By 1922, the C&A had grown to serve 28,000 customers and employed 55 people. This prosperity, however, would soon reverse with the coming of the Great Depression at the end of the decade. Like many other transit companies, the C&A suffered financially during the depression. With a decrease in ridership and increased operational costs, the C&A ended streetcar operations in 1935. On February 6, 1936, the company was renamed as the Charlottesville and Albemarle Bus Company and began providing bus service. Today, Charlottesville Area Transit provides bus transit in the Charlottesville area.

== Operation and infrastructure ==
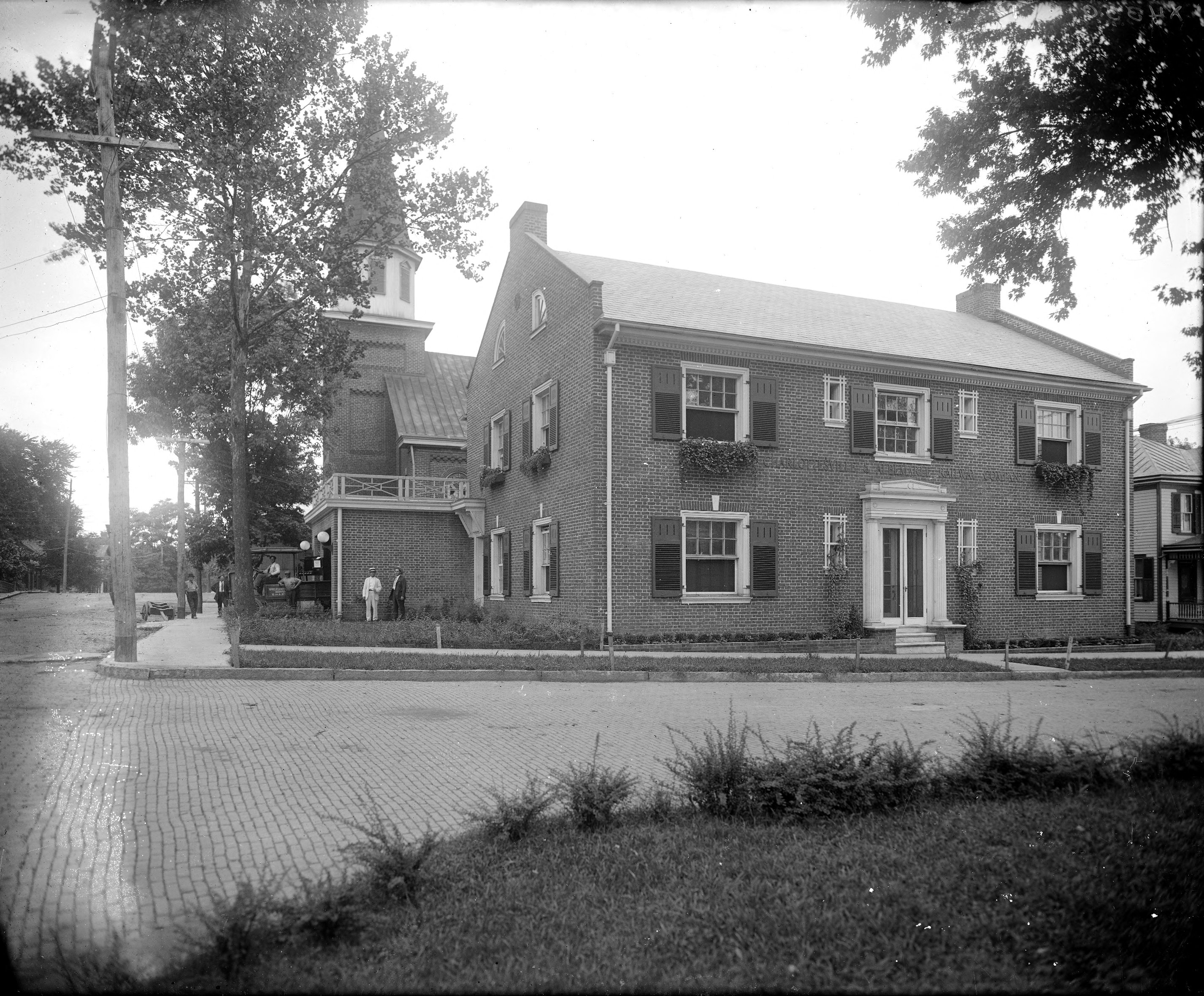
C&A headquarters building

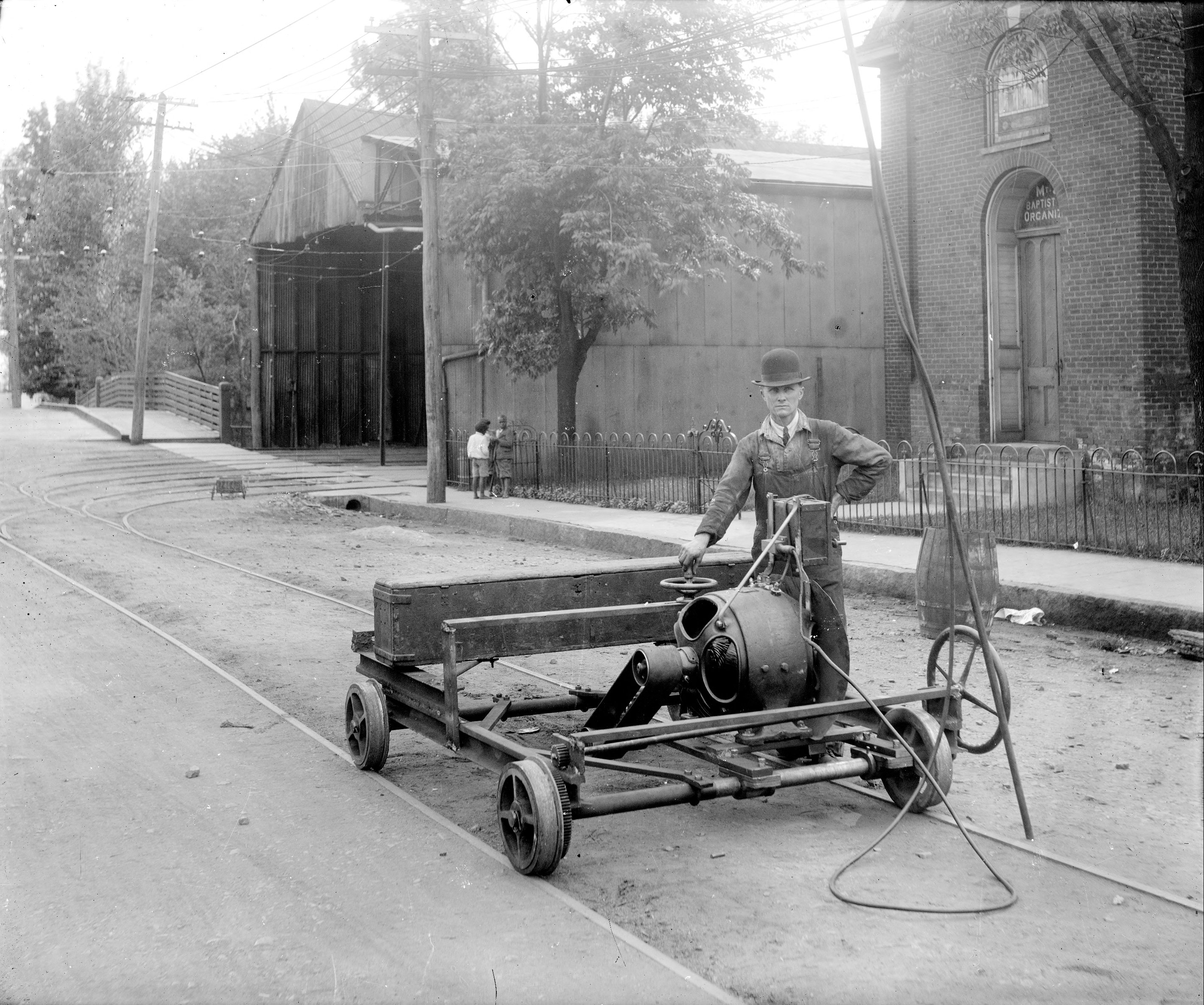
C&A track grinding machine and car barn

=== Route Description ===
As of 1920, the C&A's line was approximately 3.5 miles (5.6 km) long. The line began at its easternmost point at the C&O Station and continued west down West Main Street. At the intersection of West Main Street and Ridge Street, a short branch line down Ridge Street was in service to reach the company's car barn. The main street line continued past Ridge Street, the Charlottesville Union Station, and passed over the Southern Railway tracks before coming to the junction of West Main Street and Jefferson Park Avenue approximately 0.3 miles (0.48 km) west of the Southern tracks. At this point the line split, with one line following Jefferson Park Avenue south for approximately 1.6 miles (2.6 km) to Jefferson Park and Fry's Spring. The other line, approximately 1/2 mile (0.80 km) long, continued west on West Main Street to the University of Virginia, passing the Rotunda, before turning north on Rugby Road where the line ended just before reaching the C&O mainline.

The C&A's five passing sidings were located at the following locations: approximately halfway between the C&O station and Ridge Street on West Main Street, at the intersection of West Main Street and Ridge Street, near the union station, before the intersection of West Main Street and Jefferson Park Avenue, and approximately halfway down the Jefferson Park Avenue branch.

=== Company headquarters ===
In 1914, the C&A began construction on a new company headquarters building at 300 West Main Street, which was completed in 1916. Built in the Jeffersonian style of architecture, the new building featured red brick, white trim, and green shutters with bronze letters spelling the company name on the front. The building served as the company's headquarters, a sales room, and an electrical substation. The substation was attached to the rear of the office building and featured two 200-kilowatt converters and three 65-kilowatt transformers for the purpose of reducing the 2200-volt AC power generated at the power plant to 600-volt DC power for use in the street railway system. The substation also contained devices to prepare the power for use in street lighting. The Southern Railway took advantage of the substation and installed transformers, raising the voltage to 4400 volts, for use along the Southern's line between Calverton and Lynchburg. The building has since become an office building.

Located behind the company headquarters building was the railway's car barn, the location where the streetcars were stored and maintained. Though constructed of only leftover rail and corrugated iron, the car barn suited the railway's purpose, and most repair work was done in shop. The car barn has since become the entrance to a Greyhound Lines bus station.

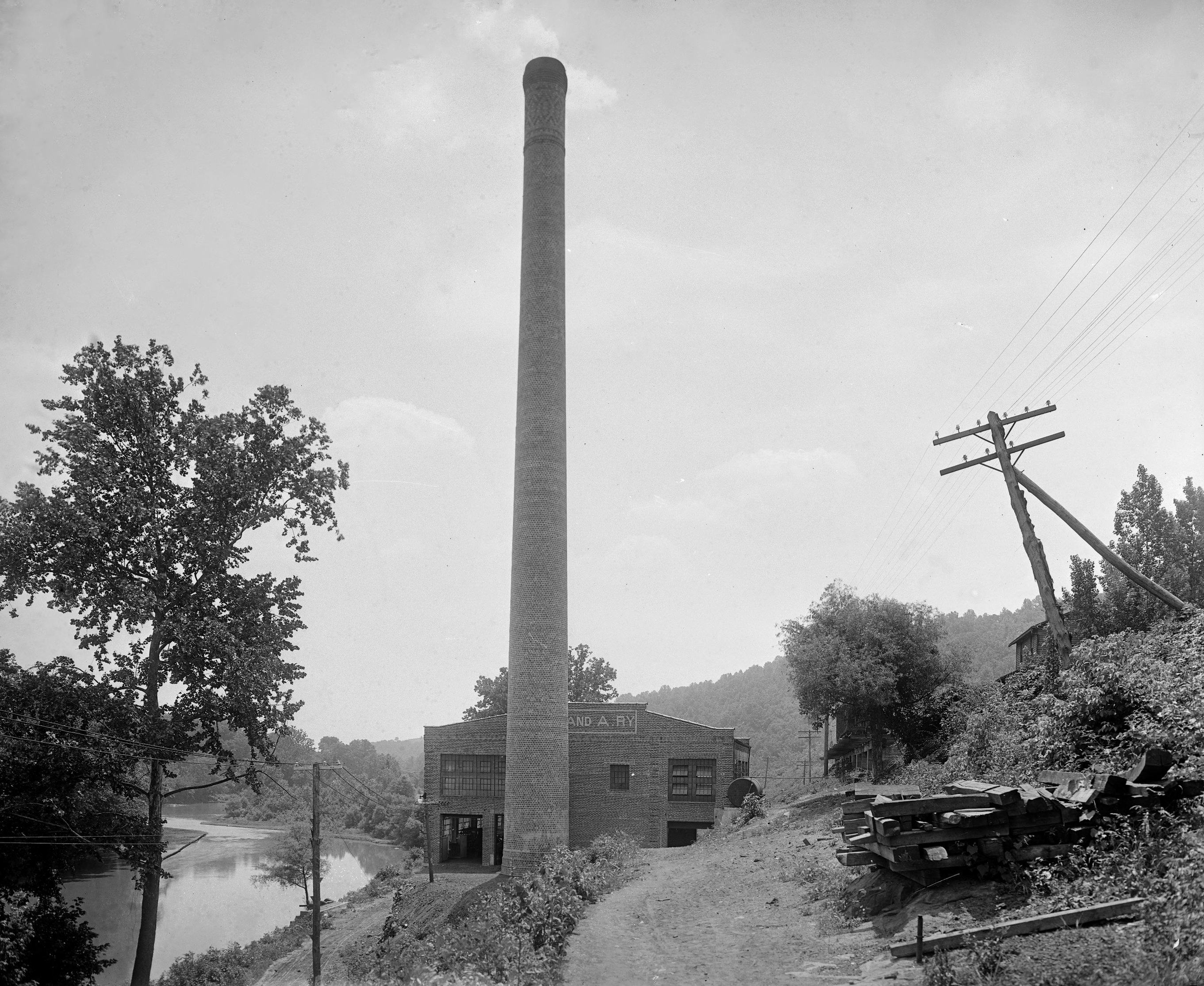
View of the C&A's new power plant in 1914

=== Power plant ===
The C&A's original power plant was located within the city of Charlottesville and produced direct current power for distribution to city residents. By the 1912 ownership change, this power plant had become worn and expensive to maintain, costing as much as 8¢ per kilowatt hour (kWh) to generate electricity (equivalent today to $2.51). The plant also suffered from a flywheel explosion that caused $15,000 worth of damage on February 14, 1913. Because of the high expense, along with the difficulties of distributing DC power over an expanding system, the building of a new power plant to produce AC power was deemed necessary.

A location was selected east of Charlottesville where the C&O mainline followed the Rivanna River, providing both an easy water supply and rail access. The Red Land Power Corporation, chartered March 29, 1913, was charged to construct a 2,000-horsepower plant for the C&A and was merged into the C&A on November 25, 1913. The old power plant was used temporarily, with new equipment, to produce AC power for the city as the new plant was being completed. Coal was provided to the new plant by way of rail, where a spur off of the C&O railway was provided to allow coal from hopper cars to be unloaded into a storage bin beneath. Two 400 hp boilers were installed along with multiple turbines and generators in order to generate the electricity. The completed plant produced 175,000 kWh per month as of 1914 and consumed four hopper cars worth of coal per month; this is contrasted with the old power plant's generation of 125,000 kWh per month consuming 14–15 cars worth, demonstrating the new plant's efficiency.

=== Jefferson Park ===
Jefferson Park, which was located near the university in western Charlottesville, was owned by the C&A. The 13-acre park was improved in the mid-1910s with a renovated dance hall using materials harvested from a hotel that was torn down nearby. The park also featured motion picture shows, boxball, roller-skating, and swings. The C&A used the park's attractions to garner further passengers on its streetcar line.

== Streetcars ==
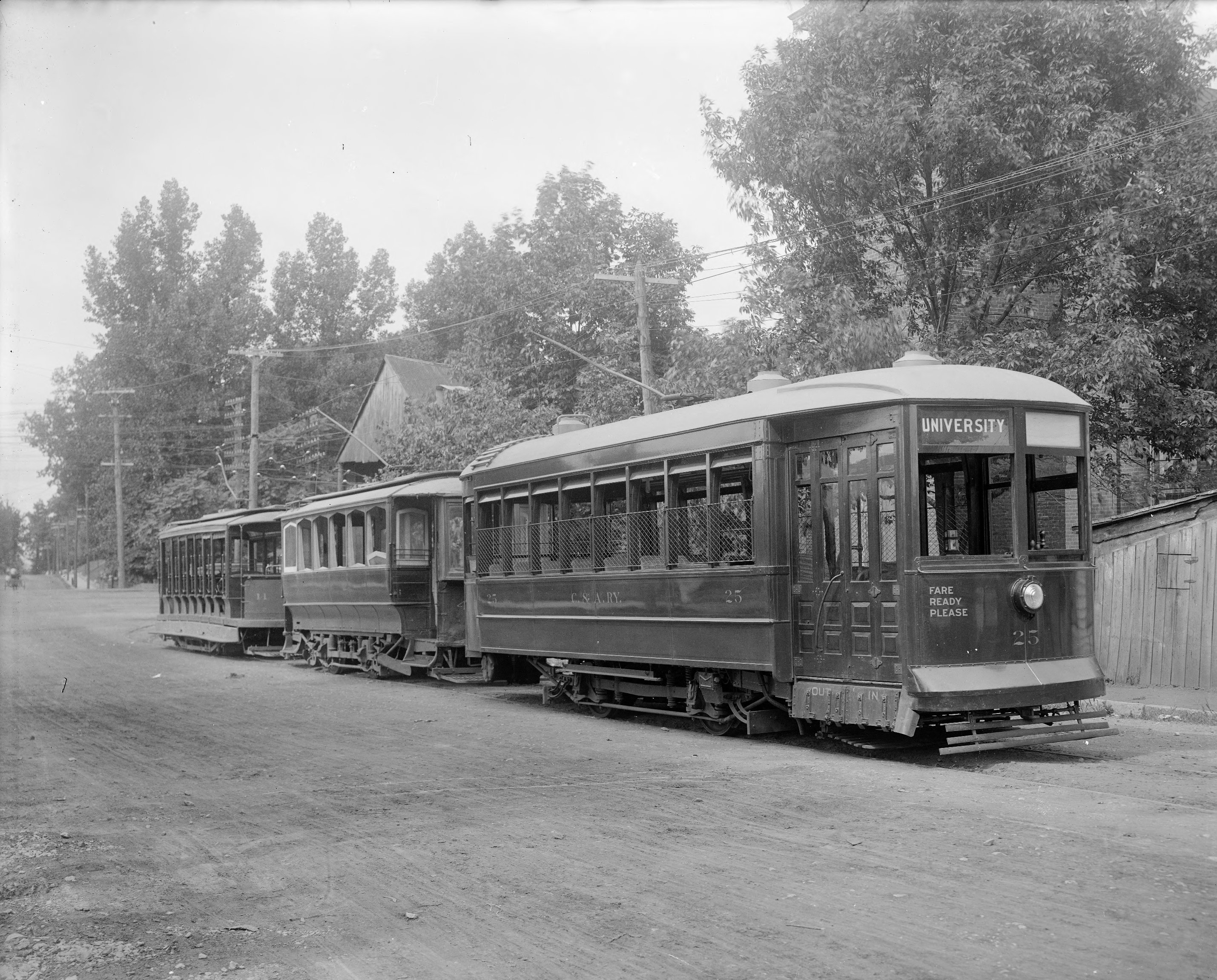
Three C&A streetcars of different types in 1914. The rightmost is an example of the new one-man streetcars purchased in 1912.

The C&A possessed multiple types of streetcars throughout its history. Both open and closed cars were used by the C&A, with these cars seating an average of 24 passengers and weighing between 24,000 and 30,000 pounds (11,000 and 14,000 kg). The closed cars were refurbished as part of the series of upgrades across the line to include new interior paint, tungsten lamps, and orange and blue exterior paint, a move to make the cars "more attractive to the students" of the University of Virginia, as these were the school's colors.

Although the old cars received cosmetic upgrades, the energy inefficiency of the cars, due in part to their heavy weight, caused the railway to seek a new and improved car. Orders were placed with the J.G. Brill Company for five new near-side one-man streetcars sometime around 1913. By June 1914, two additional cars were ordered and placed in service making for a total of seven new streetcars servicing Charlottesville. These new cars offered multiple advantages to the company, as they were lighter, weighing around 18,000 pounds (8,200 kg), seated 36 people, and could be operated by one man. The near-side cars were in length 31 feet 2 1/4 inches (9.5 m) and rode on a single truck. The benefits of the new cars allowed the company to scrap most of the older cars soon after the arrival of the new replacements.

== Future plans ==
Though the Charlottesville and Albemarle Railway's streetcars are long gone from Charlottesville, public transit is still of interest to the city. Since the rise of the personal automobile, Charlottesville has struggled to provide an effective public transportation system. Although bus service has been implemented under Charlottesville Area Transit, the city is challenged by expanding development and the lack of consumer willingness to use public transportation. In the early 2000s, the city began planning and analyzing various methods of public transportation for implementation within Charlottesville, one of which includes the development of a streetcar system. A 2005 study entitled Shaping Community with Transit laid out plans for the development of a streetcar system that would operate along West Main Street from the University of Virginia to downtown Charlottesville, following much of the same path as the Charlottesville and Albemarle Railway. A Streetcar Task Force was created in December 2006 by the City Council to examine the feasibility of a streetcar system, though no concrete plans have been developed or implemented as of 2012.
