= Thoroughbred Shortline Program =

1987 shortline railroad creation program

The Thoroughbred Shortline Program was a system of shortline creation devised by Norfolk Southern in the late 1980s. It involved an alternative to the typical practice of a Class I railroad selling rail lines outright to shortlines in the post-Staggers Act era. Defining features of the program included leasing lines to shortline operators, as opposed to outright sales, keeping stations available in Norfolk Southern marketing campaigns, and crediting carloads delivered to Norfolk Southern towards the lease and eventual purchase of the line. The program ran from 1988 to 1991, creating more than a dozen new shortline railroads, nearly all of which are still in operation today.

== Background ==
The period following railroad deregulation under the provisions of the Staggers Rail Act of 1980 spawned a plethora of railroad rationalization programs. In addition to outright abandonment of low density routes, many of the more promising lines were sold to shortline operators. A reoccurring problem was that many of these new railroads were often so overburdened by the costs of purchasing the infrastructure they operated on, that they lacked the capital to expand their customer base and improve their railroads.

Norfolk Southern explored the creation of its own rationalization program in 1987, with the goal of reorganizing 2,700 miles (4,300 km) of low density lines spread throughout their 27,000 miles (43,000 km) of track. 1,500 miles (2,400 km) of track were abandoned outright, with the remaining tracks slated to be distributed to shortlines. The result was the creation of the Thoroughbred Shortline Program.

== The Program ==
A key fixture of the Thoroughbred Shortline Program included leasing, as opposed to selling, railroads to shortline operators. This spared the new startups from expensive costs of taking out loans for mortgage payments on the railroads. The second component of the program involved crediting carloads delivered to Norfolk Southern by the shortlines towards the lease. So long as the shortline could maintain the same annual carloads on the line as Norfolk Southern, they owed no payments towards the lease. This also kept traffic directed on Norfolk Southern interchange points, as opposed to competitors lines. Leases under the program spanned between 3 and 20 years, after which the shortlines had the option of purchasing the railroad outright.

=== Shortlines Created ===
- Aberdeen, Carolina and Western Railway
- Carolina and Northwestern Railroad
- Carolina Coastal Railway
- Central Railroad of Indianapolis
- Chattooga and Chickamauga Railway
- Chesapeake and Albemarle Railroad
- Commonwealth Railway
- Georgia and Alabama Railroad
- Great Walton Railroad
- Indiana Hi-Rail Corporation
- Indiana Rail Road
- North Carolina and Virginia Railroad
- Ogeechee Railway
- Pickens Railway
- South Carolina Central Railroad
- Yadkin Valley Railroad
