= Marion and Rye Valley Railway =

Overview
- Locale: Virginia
- Dates of operation: 1891–1931

Technical
- Track gauge: 4 ft 8 1/2 in (1,435 mm) standard gauge

The Marion and Rye Valley Railway was a standard gauge logging railroad that ran from an intersection with the Norfolk and Western Railway at Marion, Virginia, southward to Sugar Grove, Virginia.

At Sugar Grove, it intersected with the Virginia Southern Railroad which ran from Sugar Grove, across Iron Mountain, through Troutdale and then westward to Fairwood. There was also a branch from the wye track at Sugar Grove that went eastward toward Camp, Virginia. The two railroads combined formed a line operating some 27 or so miles. Both were initially owned separately, but eventually fell under the same management and ownership.

The main line followed future Highway 16 S from Marion, Va for several miles until turning right onto Currin Valley road. The railroad featured four switchbacks between Currin Valley, south of Marion, and Teas, just west of Sugar Grove, and another set of switchbacks between Sugar Grove and Troutdale at the top of Iron Mountain.

Motive power for the railroad was provided by Shay-type locomotives, an Alco consolidation, a Heisler, and an Edwards Motorcar.

The railroad was chartered by the State Corporation Commission of Virginia in 1891 as the Marion and Rye Valley Railroad, reorganized in 1900 as the "Marion and Rye Valley Railway Company", and disbanded in 1931 and sold to the Marion Brick Company. The line was abandoned sometime afterward.

There are virtually no remains of the railroads today other than abandoned railroad grades and a few spikes that are eroded out of the old grades from time to time.
