= Norfolk and Portsmouth Belt Line Railroad =

Railroad in southern Virginia

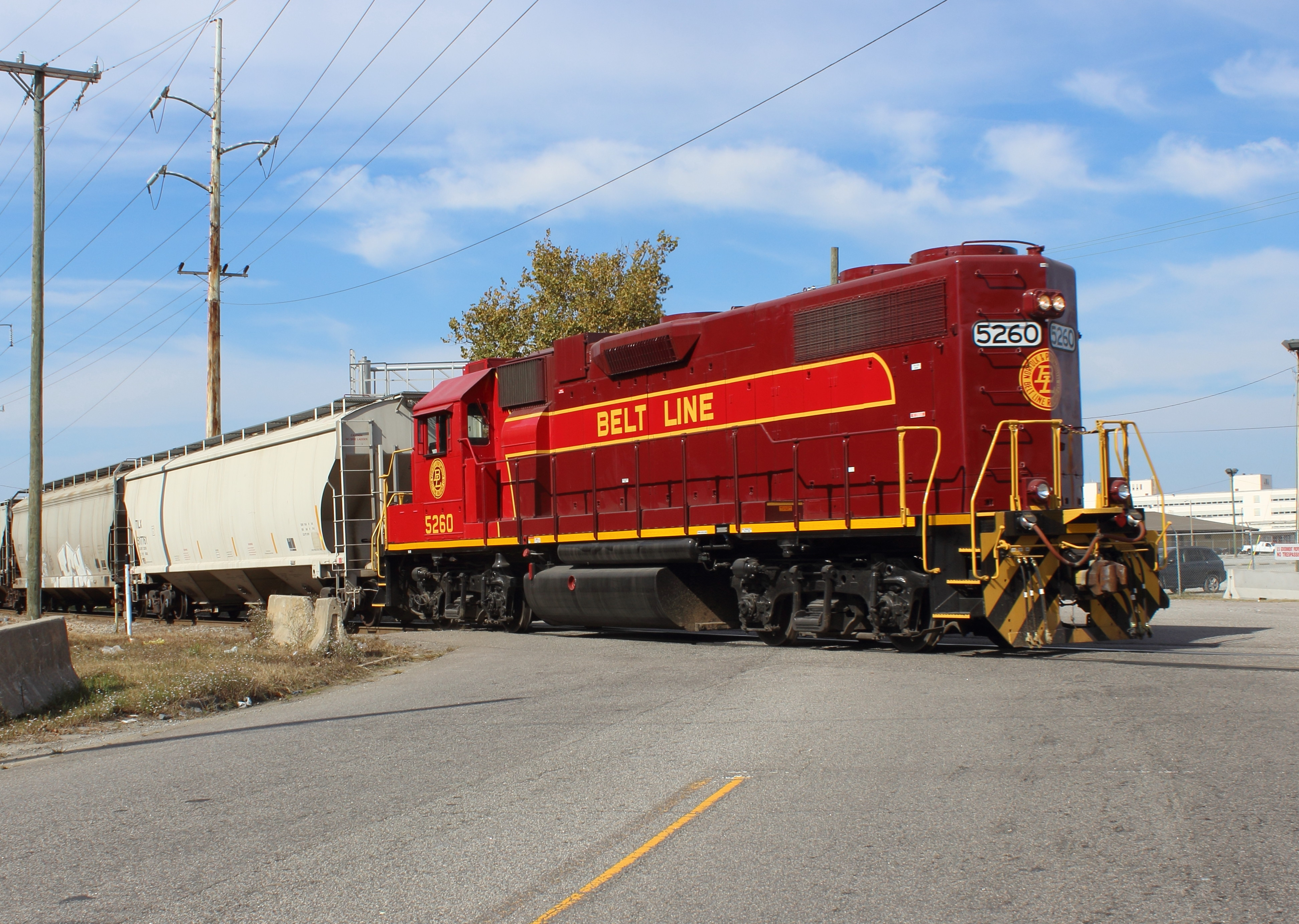
- NPBL EMD GP38-2 number 5260 at Elm Avenue crossing in Portsmouth, Virginia.

Overview
- Headquarters: Norfolk, Virginia
- Reporting mark: NPB
- Locale: Chesapeake, Virginia to Portsmouth, Virginia
- Dates of operation: March 4, 1896–

Other
- Website: Official website

The Norfolk and Portsmouth Belt Line Railroad (reporting mark NPB) is a class III railroad operating in southern Virginia.

== History ==
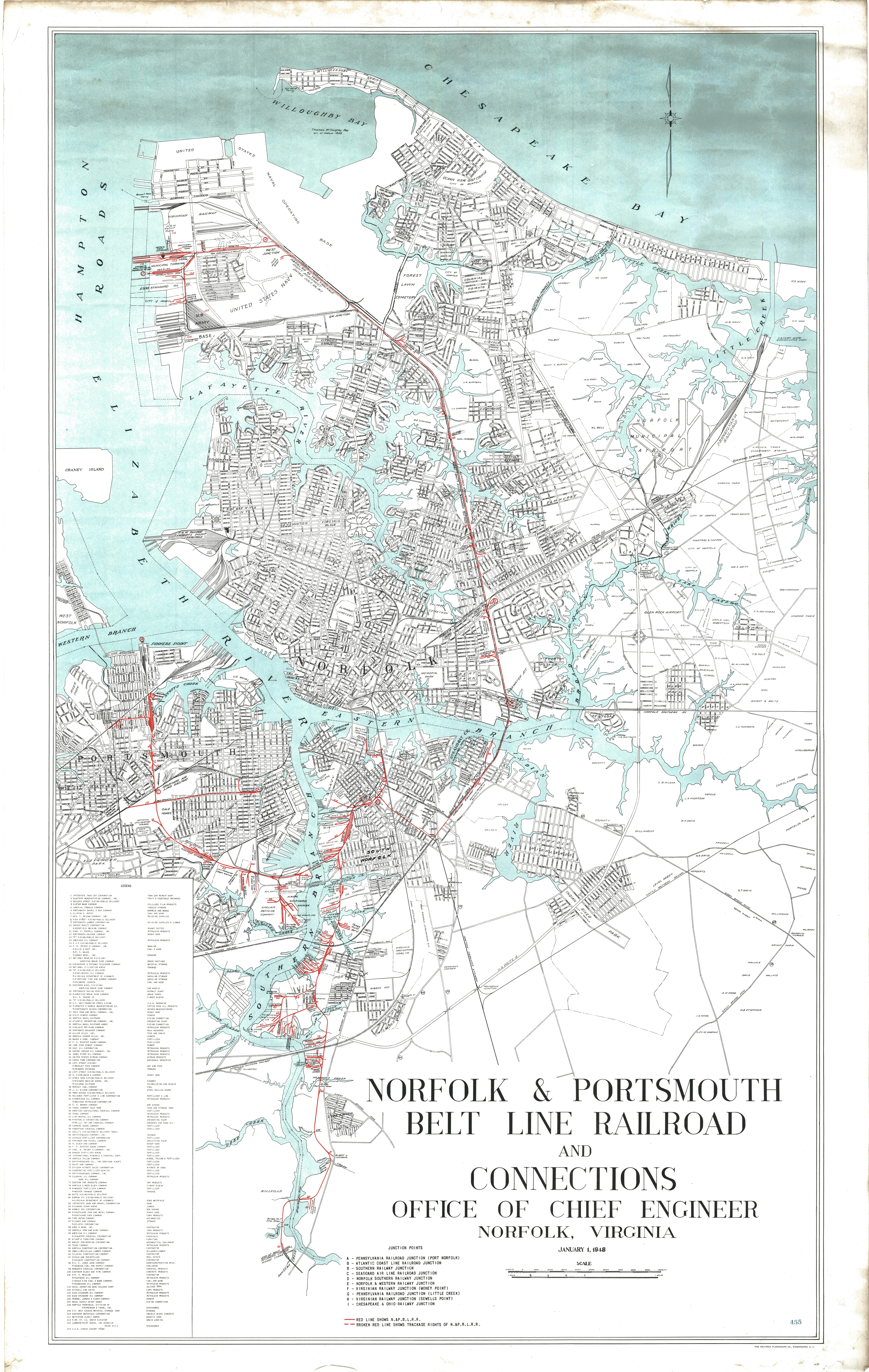
1948 N&PBL (Norfolk and Portsmouth Belt Line Railroad) map showing railroad system and major customers in City of Norfolk, City of Portsmouth, Norfolk County/Incorporated Town of South Norfolk (now Chesapeake), Virginia.

The NPB serves Norfolk, Portsmouth and Chesapeake and has been operating since 1896. It is a Class III terminal switching railroad, incorporated in the State of Virginia as the Southeastern and Atlantic Railroad Company on March 4, 1896, currently operating over 26 miles of road in the Hampton Roads communities of Norfolk, Portsmouth and Chesapeake. The Belt Line adopted its current corporate name on January 12, 1898 and acquired and absorbed the Elizabeth River Railroad in 1910. The Belt Line was originally formed by eight railroads: Norfolk & Western, Chesapeake & Ohio, Southern Railway Co., New York, Philadelphia & Norfolk, Atlantic & Danville Railway, Atlantic Coast Line, Norfolk Southern Railway (1942–1982), and Seaboard Air Line. The NPBL is owned fifty-seven percent by Norfolk Southern Railway and forty-three percent by CSX Transportation.

== Interchanges ==
The NPBL interchanges with; Chesapeake and Albemarle Railroad, CSX Transportation, and Norfolk Southern. The NPBL is a terminal switching company that owns 36 miles (58 km) of track, (plus 27 miles (43 km) of trackage rights) and links commerce around the deepwater port from Sewells Point to Portsmouth Marine Terminal, including the Southern Branch Elizabeth River. It currently serves 24 industries.

NPBL interchanges rail cars between connecting line haul carriers and various marine terminals and industries located along its tracks. It currently operates one main classification yard located in the South Norfolk area of Chesapeake, Virginia, where its General Office, T&E, and Maintenance of Way facilities are also located. In addition to its own tracks, the NPBL utilizes certain tracks of its owning railroads through trackage rights agreements.

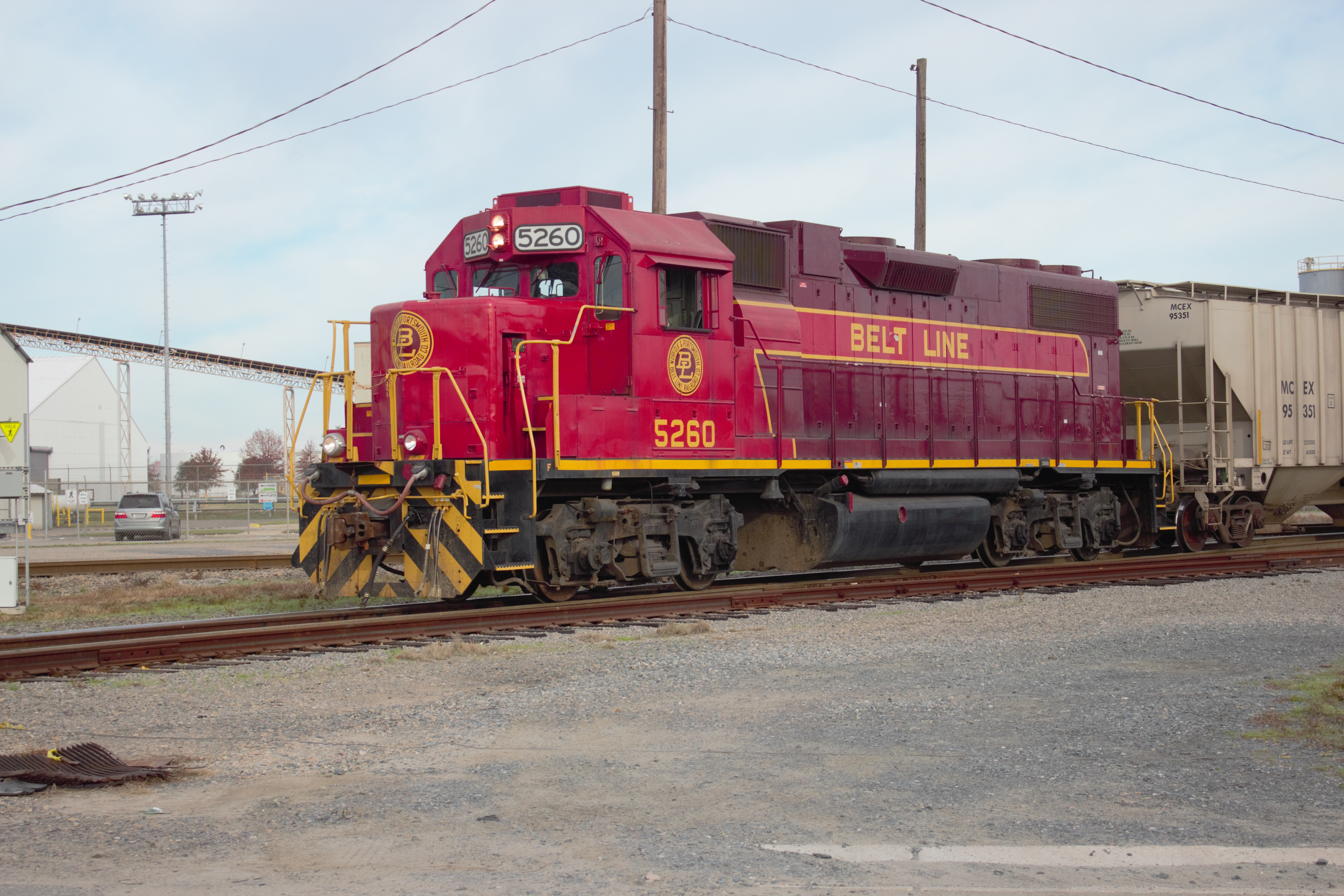
Norfolk & Portsmouth Belt Line EMD GP38-2 #5260 at south end of Berkley Yard in City of Chesapeake, Virginia; November, 2015. Photographer: David E. George III

Currently all Norfolk and Portsmouth Belt Line locomotives are provided by Norfolk Southern Corporation. EMD GP38-2 number 5260 was painted in a commemorative scheme in 2013.

== Locomotive roster ==
Locomotive model	Road number	Notes
EMD GP38-2	5008	
EMD GP38-2	5009	
EMD GP38-2	5010	
EMD GP38-2	5011	
EMD GP38-2	5260	Wrecked in October 2026
