= White Top Railway =

Former railway line in Virginia

WT Shay #4 as seen from the company store.

The White Top Railway was chartered as a common carrier in the early 20th century from a portion of the logging lines of the Hassinger Lumber Company in Washington and Grayson Counties, Virginia, United States. The move was born of the lumber company's need to protect its rail operations at points of intersection with the Virginia-Carolina Railway from possible condemnation for the V-C's own, expanding line. (Both roads were vying for right-of-way through the narrow confines of the Laurel Creek gorge.)

The length of the WT was a scant 8 miles, covering the distance from the mill in Konnarock to the mountain village of White Top. This mileage represented a small percentage of Hassinger's 75 miles of logging line. The WT was built as a standard gauge line, although a third rail was added for two miles near the mill to accommodate narrow gauge trains acquired with the purchase of the T.W. Thayer Lumber Co. in 1924. Operations on the WT ceased upon or soon after the closing of the mill on Christmas Eve 1928.

The WT locomotive roster included two Climax and three Shay geared steam locomotives. WT rolling stock included 20 flat cars; two log loaders; a steam ditcher; a steel flat car; and at least one caboose (seen behind the log loader and at the end of the train in the photo to the left.)

Road no.	Mfg	c/n	Class	Acquired/Shipped	Comment
1	Climax	526	B-25	1907	From Douglas Land Co., Damascus, VA. Re-gauged. Sold 1929.
2	Climax	353	B-35	1907	From Hassinger PA operations. Re-gauged. For sale in 1929.
3	Shay	2013	70-3	October 1907	Purchased new. Sold to Deep Cut Tie & Lumber Co. prior to 1926.
4	Shay	2700	100-4	December 1913	Purchased new; only 4-truck Shay built for a customer outside of railroad industry. Sold to Bemis Lbr. Co. in Robbinsville, NC. Scrapped in 1947.
2	Shay	2205	36-2	March 1923	From Damascus Lbr. Co. Re-gauged.
