= Shenandoah Valley Railroad (1867–1890) =

Defunct American railroad

Overview
- Headquarters: Roanoke, Virginia
- Locale: Maryland, West Virginia and Virginia
- Dates of operation: 1867–1890
- Successor: Norfolk and Western Railway

Technical
- Track gauge: 4 ft 8 1/2 in (1,435 mm) standard gauge
- Length: 239.3 miles (385.1 km)
1882 station map

Shenandoah Valley Railroad was a line completed on June 19, 1882, extending up the Shenandoah Valley from Hagerstown, Maryland through the West Virginia panhandle into Virginia to reach Roanoke, Virginia and to connect with the Norfolk and Western Railway (N&W). The development of this railroad had considerable backing from the Pennsylvania Railroad. In September 1890 it went into bankruptcy and was reorganized as the Shenandoah Valley Railway. In December 1890, it became part of N&W. The line is now part of the Roanoke District of the Norfolk Southern system.

== Planning ==
The organizers of the SVRR planned to construct a railroad from the Pennsylvania Railroad (PRR) station in Hagerstown, Maryland (a branch out of Harrisburg, PA called the Cumberland Valley Railroad) to the Virginia and Tennessee Railroad (V&T) in Salem, Virginia. The route called for 243 miles (391 km) of new construction. The line follows closely the great iron ore belt along the western slope of the Blue Ridge Mountains.

Peter Bouck Borst of Page County, Virginia introduced a charter for the railroad for a bill before the Virginia General Assembly in 1866. The ambitious plan was to build a railroad from Harpers Ferry, West Virginia, to the Virginia Central Railroad somewhere near Staunton, to a connection with the V&T around Salem, and finally to somewhere near the southwest corner of Virginia to meet the East Tennessee and Virginia Railroad at Bristol, Virginia.

Since the route traversed three states (Maryland, West Virginia, and Virginia) three legislative authorizations were required. Virginia provided approval on February 23, 1867. West Virginia approved the construction idea on February 25, 1870. Maryland provided the final approval needed on April 4, 1870.

On March 14, 1870, the company was formed and the first president, Peter Bouck Borst, was elected.

== Rival railroads ==
After Maryland approved construction of a bridge over the Potomac river anywhere between Harpers Ferry and Williamsport, the Pennsylvania Railroad (PRR) took notice. There could be link with rival B&O railroad, as well as a link with its own Cumberland Valley Railroad, just north of Williamsport in Hagerstown. This new north/south line would be the key to capturing the traffic on numerous just-acquired southern lines and directing it to the port of Philadelphia. The competing B&O wanted to divert the riches of the area to the port of Baltimore and expand into the south. Each tried to cut off the other from the south. Meanwhile, Virginia really didn’t want either to succeed so that traffic would be directed to the Norfolk port.

The PRR began purchasing stock in the SVRR, and took effective control of it. B&O took control of a competing north/south line called the Valley Railroad. The plans showed the railroads were to run parallel to each other through the valley, sometimes just a few miles apart. The race was on.

== Main line construction (1870–1882) ==
The Central Improvement Company (a subsidiary of Pennsylvania Railroad) was awarded a contract to construct 224 miles (360 km) of the SVRR from Shepherdstown to Salem for $35,000 a mile. The work was to be completed by August 1872. The major source of capital came from the sale of 6% mortgage bonds backed by the Pennsylvania Railroad.

In 1871, Thomas A. Scott was elected as the second president of SVRR; he was also a Vice President of the Pennsylvania Railroad. Peter B. Borst was forced out because of his involvement with a competing plan for a similar rail line called the Luray Valley Railroad Company that was pushed through the Virginia General Assembly in 1870.

In August 1871, the Central Improvement Company submitted a proposal to cancel the construction contract, asking for payment only for work completed. The proposal was rejected by SVRR. In 1872, the deadline for completion of the railroad was extended to January 1875 and 94 miles (151 km) of work south of the C&O railroad in Staunton eliminated. Service began between Shepherdstown, WV and the Shenandoah River on December 15, 1879.

In September 1872, the Cumberland Valley Railroad (a subsidiary of Pennsylvania Railroad) was asked to construct the tracks from their station in Hagerstown, MD to Shepherdstown, WV. Service began on that stretch in 1880.

Problems with PRR escalated over the inability to obtain a traffic contract with the Cumberland Valley Railroad. SVRR sent a team of surveyors during the summer of 1880 into Pennsylvania indicating a desire to build a line to Harrisburg to connect with the competing Philadelphia and Reading Railroad line. The bluff worked and a contract was worked out. But the split with PRR was now inevitable.

Proposed southern extension from Waynesboro to Bonsack's and Norfolk and Western (1880)

Also in 1880, service began on the section south of the Shenandoah River between Elkton and Waynesboro. In 1881 the north and south sections were connected. Finally, in 1882, it stretched south to meet the Norfolk and Western Railroad in the new railroad town of Roanoke, Virginia. The track was now complete.

Meanwhile, rival Valley Railroad (VRR) was trying to raise capital. With Robert E. Lee as its spokesman, it convinced Baltimore to authorize $1,000,000 to secure funding by other Virginia counties. Baltimore was to gain considerably by having the traffic from the richest parts of the south directed its way. Many delays occurred, particularly after the recession on the 1870s, but traffic finally began between Harrisonburg and Staunton in 1883. The southern section was never constructed.

== Recession, strikes and bankruptcy (1882–1890) ==
The financial panic of 1873 brought a deep recession that suppressed business into the 1880s. In 1882 SVRR received a loan of $79,000 from Philadelphia financiers E.W. Clark & Co. to cover that year’s shortfall. The life of all the bridges was ending and significant funds would be needed in the coming years.

In 1882, N&W made a deal with PRR to swap the SVRR share capital for N&W common stock. SVRR got a loan from N&W of $600,000, plus up to $200,000 per year for 3 years. PRR kicked in $150,000 as advanced payment for highly discounted future traffic contracts. Control of SVRR stock was now with N&W. In 1883, SVRR floated $1.8 million of income bonds. Revenues continued to be far below forecast due to the bad economy.

In early 1885, SVRR defaulted on its loan interest, taxes, payrolls, and bills. A Roanoke judge put the line in a receivership, but in December, the mortgage company holding its notes filed suit for liquidation of the road’s assets. The Norfolk and Western Railroad fought a legal battle for the next four years to regain control. On September 30, 1890, the SVRR was reorganized as the Shenandoah Valley "Railway", with stockholders approval to sell to N&W. On December 2, the Shenandoah Valley Railway acquired the rights to the franchise of the Washington and Western Railroad. On December 15, 1890, N&W purchased the company outright for $6,000,000 of stock and added the rails to its system.

The competing Valley Railroad ran out of capital to build in 1884 and struggled until it went into receivership in 1896. The final length of that line was 36 miles (58 km) from Staunton to Lexington, the southern 51 miles (82 km) to Salem never finished. The line was never profitable.

== Stations ==
Mile	Location
0.0	Hagerstown, (Washington County) MD
5.9	Saint James, MD
9.0	Grimes, MD
14.1	Antietam, MD
16.9	Shepherdstown, (Jefferson County) WV
19	Morgans Grove, WV
23.1	Shenandoah Junction, WV
28.4	Charlestown, WV
32.5	Wheatland, WV
33.7	Rippon, WV
36.2	Gaylord, (Clarke County) VA
39.9	Berryville, VA
46.2	Boyce, VA
49.2	White Post, VA
53.2	Ashby, (Warren County) VA
56.4	Cedarville, VA
59.2	Riverton, VA
62.1	Front Royal, VA
66.4	Manor, VA
72.9	Bentonville, VA
75.6	Overall, (Page County) VA
79.8	Rileyville, VA

Mile	Location
83	Vaughn’s Summit
85.1	Kimball, VA
86	Elgin, VA
88.8	Luray, VA
95.6	Marksville (Stanley), VA
101.9	Ingham, VA
104.0	Grove Hill, VA
106.7	Milnes, VA
112.5	Elkton, (Rockingham County) VA
??	Sellers
127.2	Port Republic
130	Grottoes
129.1	Weyer’s Cave, (Augusta County) VA
132.1	Patterson
133	Harriston
136.9	Crimora, VA
141	Dooms, VA
143.2	Waynesboro Junction, VA
148.0	Lyndhurst, VA
150.0	Lipscomb, VA
153.0	Stuart’s Draft, VA
159.4	Greenville, VA

Mile	Location
162.7	Lofton, VA
167.6	Vesuvius, (Rockbridge County) VA
174.9	Midvale, VA
179.7	Riverside, VA
186	Buena Vista, VA
186	Loch Laird, VA
188.7	Thompson, VA
191.0	Buffalo Forge, VA
197	Glasgow, VA
198.6	Natural Bridge, VA
207	Solitude
208.9	Arcadia, (Botetourt County) VA
214.2	Buchanan, VA
219.2	Lithia, VA
224.6	Houston, VA
225	Nace, VA
227.9	Troutville, VA
232.2	Cloverdale, VA
234	Hollins, (Roanoke County) VA
236.5	Tinker Creek
239.3	Roanoke, VA

== Historical timeline ==
1867	Shenandoah Valley Railroad chartered 2/23/1867
1870	Shenandoah Valley Railroad organized as a subsidiary of the Pennsylvania Railroad.; Work on the road (railroad track) begins.
1873	Work is suspended because of difficulty with contractor
1879	Construction resumes in the spring of 1879.; Train service begins between Shepherdstown and the Shenandoah river on 12/15/1879 (42 miles).
1880	Service extended southward from Shenandoah River to Front Royal on 4/1/1880.; Service extended southward to Bentonville on 5/10/1880.; Service extended northward to Hagerstown on 8/19/1880.; Service extended southward to Milford (now Overall) on 9/6/1880.; Separate section of service between Elkton and Waynesboro (area now called Basic City) begins on 11/22/1880.; The northern section extended south to Shenandoah Iron Works on 12/20/1880.
1881	Elsewhere: Norfolk & Western Railroad Company (N&W) formed from purchase of Atlantic, Mississippi, and Ohio Railroad.; Virginia, Tennessee, Georgia Air Line was formed via a contract between SVRR, N&W, and the East Tennessee, Virginia, and Georgia Railroad. The Air Line was between Hagerstown, MD and Norfolk, VA.; The northern and southern sections of track are connected on 4/18/1881. Service is now from Hagerstown MD to Waynesboro VA.
1882	Track completed southward from Waynesboro (Basic), VA to Roanoke, VA on 6/19/1882. Connection with Norfolk & Western Railroad is established.; A contract between SVRR and N&W is signed on 12/29/1882 (ratified by stockholders on 2/12/1883). The majority of SVRR share capital was traded for N&W common stock. N&W agreed to loan SVRR up to $200,000 per year, for a maximum of 3 years from 1/2/1883, if it loses money.
1883	First-ever annual report is published. It is called the "Third Annual Report" to coincide with the N&W numbering scheme.; Loss of $183,648.16 is covered by $200,000 loan from N&W for year 1883.
1884	The Southern Despatch Line is formed between Pennsylvania Railroad, Cumberland Valley Railroad, Western Maryland Railroad, SVRR, N&W, and East Tennessee, Virginia and Georgia Railroad.; $135,000 loan from N&W for year 1884.
1885	Shenandoah Valley Railroad forced into receivership 04/01/1885.
1890	In September, Shenandoah Valley Railroad sold under foreclosure and reorganized as the Shenandoah Valley Railway; in December, Shenandoah Valley Railway is acquired and absorbed by Norfolk & Western Railroad.

== Passenger service ==
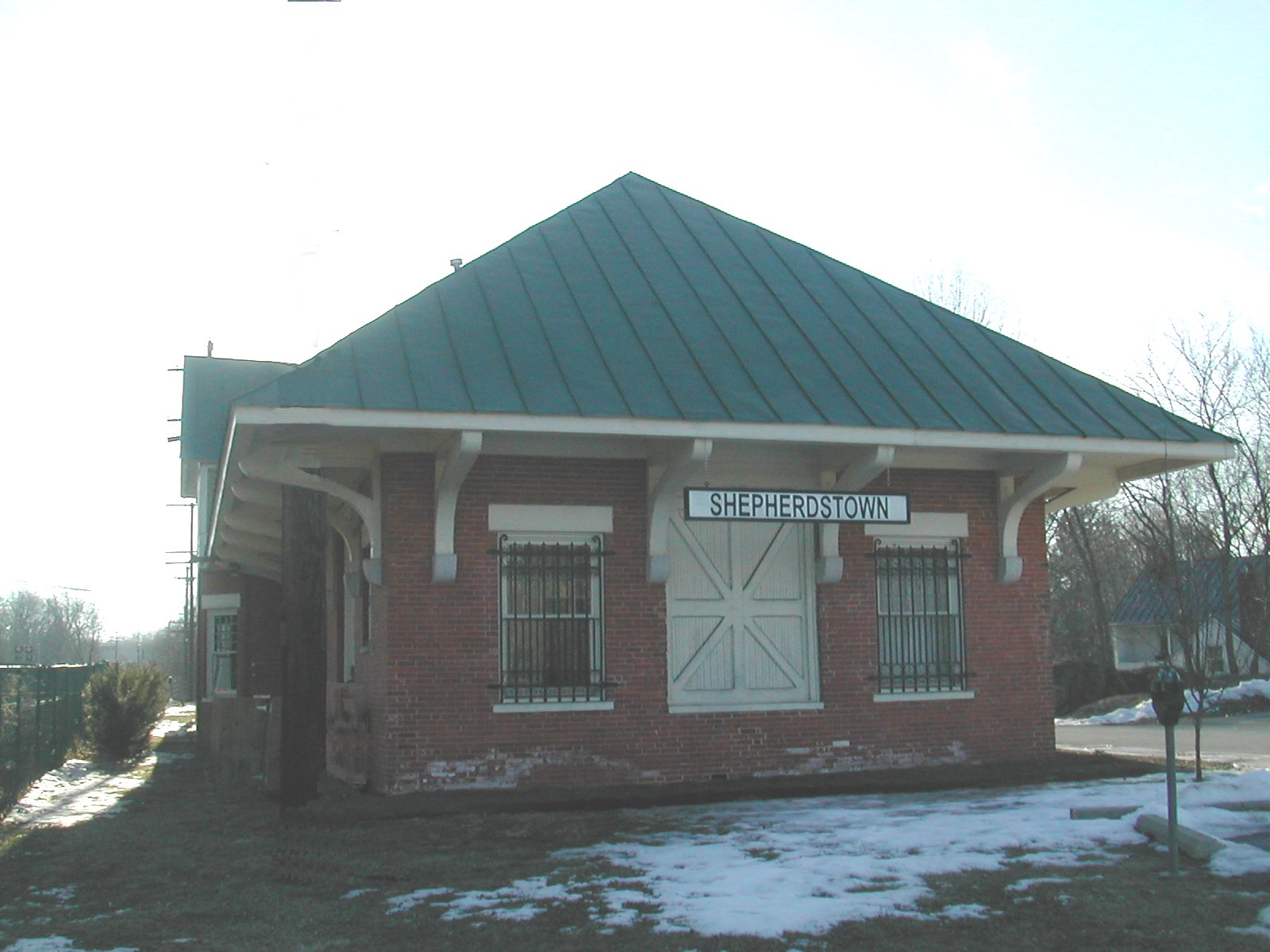
Shepherdstown station

Into the mid-20th century the new owners, the Norfolk & Western, operated two passenger trains a day in each direction. The #1 (southbound) and the #2 (northbound), Roanoke-New York City via Hagerstown and Harrisburg, were part of a pooled long distance night train in cooperation with the Pennsylvania Railroad, complete with Pullman service and lounge car service. This service ended on June 10, 1962.

== See also ==
- List of defunct Maryland railroads
- List of defunct Virginia railroads
- List of defunct West Virginia railroads
- Shenandoah Valley Railroad (short-line)
