= Valley Rail =

Valley Rail may refer to:

- Valley Metro Rail, a light rail system in Phoenix, Arizona
- Valley Rail (ACE), a project to expand Altamont Corridor Express (ACE) commuter rail in California
- North Valley Rail, a project to expand rail service in Northern California
- Valley Railway, a short line railroad in Ohio

== See also ==
- Valley Railroad (disambiguation)
- Valley Link, a planned rail service in Alameda and San Joaquin Counties, California
- Cross Valley Corridor, a project to initiate passenger rail service across the Central Valley of California
