= New River, Holston and Western Railroad =

The New River, Holston and Western Railroad (reporting mark NH&W) was an intrastate railroad in southwestern Virginia.

It extended from Narrows on the New River in Giles County to Suiter in Bland County. The railroad followed the course of Wolf Creek or its tributaries for its entire length. The total distance between Narrows and Suiter is approximately 43 miles.

Construction started in 1903 from Narrows, but only three miles of track was laid. In 1912, the line was extended to Rocky Gap and by 1914 had reached Suiter. In 1919, the line was sold to the Norfolk and Western Railway. Operations continued until 1946.
