= Norfolk, Virginia Beach and Southern Railroad =

19th-century Virginian railway

The Norfolk, Virginia Beach and Southern Railroad was a 19th-century railroad that operated a line from downtown Norfolk to the Virginia Beach oceanfront, where the railroad owned and operated the Princess Anne Hotel. A branch split southeast from the present day Newtown Rd area and proceeded into Princess Anne county following the route of today's Princess Anne Road. The branch terminated at Munden where the railroad operated a turntable as well as two steam ferries. The Munden site is now Munden Point park of the City of Virginia Beach Parks and Recreation. Only the wharves remain of this early intermodal operation.

In 1900, the railroad was acquired by Norfolk and Southern Railroad, which merged into the Southern Railway system in 1974. In 1982, Southern Railway and Norfolk and Western Railway merged to create the new Norfolk Southern Railway.
