= Virginia Southern Railroad =

Overview
- Headquarters: Keysville, Virginia
- Reporting mark: VSRR
- Locale: Southern Virginia, northern North Carolina
- Dates of operation: 1988–

Technical
- Track gauge: 4 ft 8 1/2 in (1,435 mm) standard gauge

The Virginia Southern Railroad (reporting mark VSRR) is a shortline railroad division of the North Carolina and Virginia Railroad (reporting mark NCVA), a subsidiary of the Genesee & Wyoming, with rights to operate 78 miles (126 km) of track between Norfolk Southern Railway connections at Oxford, North Carolina and Burkeville, Virginia. The southernmost segment between Clarksville, Virginia and Oxford is out of service.

The line was built by the Oxford and Clarksville Railroad, Clarksville and North Carolina Railroad, Atlantic and Danville Railway, Richmond and Mecklenburg Railroad, and Richmond and Danville Railroad, all predecessors of the Southern Railway (except for the short piece of A&D, which left the Southern system for the Norfolk and Western Railway), and in November 1988 successor Norfolk Southern leased it to the new Virginia Southern Railroad as the first spin-off in its Thoroughbred Shortline Program.

The NCVA and VSRR were previously owned by Railtex and RailAmerica, and is now operated by the Buckingham Branch Railroad.

== See also ==
- Genesee & Wyoming
- Thoroughbred Shortline Program
