= Big Stony Railway =

Historic Virginia intrastate railroad

The Big Stony Railway is a historic intrastate railroad that operated in Virginia.

Located in the southwestern part of the state, it extended from Big Stony Junction on the New River in Giles County to the West Virginia border near Kire. At the border, it connected with the Interior and West Virginia Railroad, which ran to the Virginia border near Laurel Branch in Monroe County. From the border, the Virginia and Potts Creek Railroad ran to Potts Creek in Craig County. The railroad followed the course of Big Stony Creek to the Virginia-West Virginia border, where it began following Potts Creek, a tributary of the James River . The total distance between Big Stony Junction and Potts Creek is approximately 39 miles (63 km).

Construction started in 1892 from the New River and reached Interior by 1896. In 1905, the line was acquired by the Norfolk and Western Railroad, which extended the line to the Virginia-West Virginia border and chartered the additional companies to complete the line to Potts Creek. The line reached its greatest extent by 1910. In 1934, the upper 34 miles (55 km) of the line were abandoned. The remaining 5 miles (8.0 km) of the line are operated as the Potts Valley Branch of Norfolk Southern, and serve a lime plant at Kimballton.
