= North Carolina and Virginia Railroad =

Railway line in the U.S.

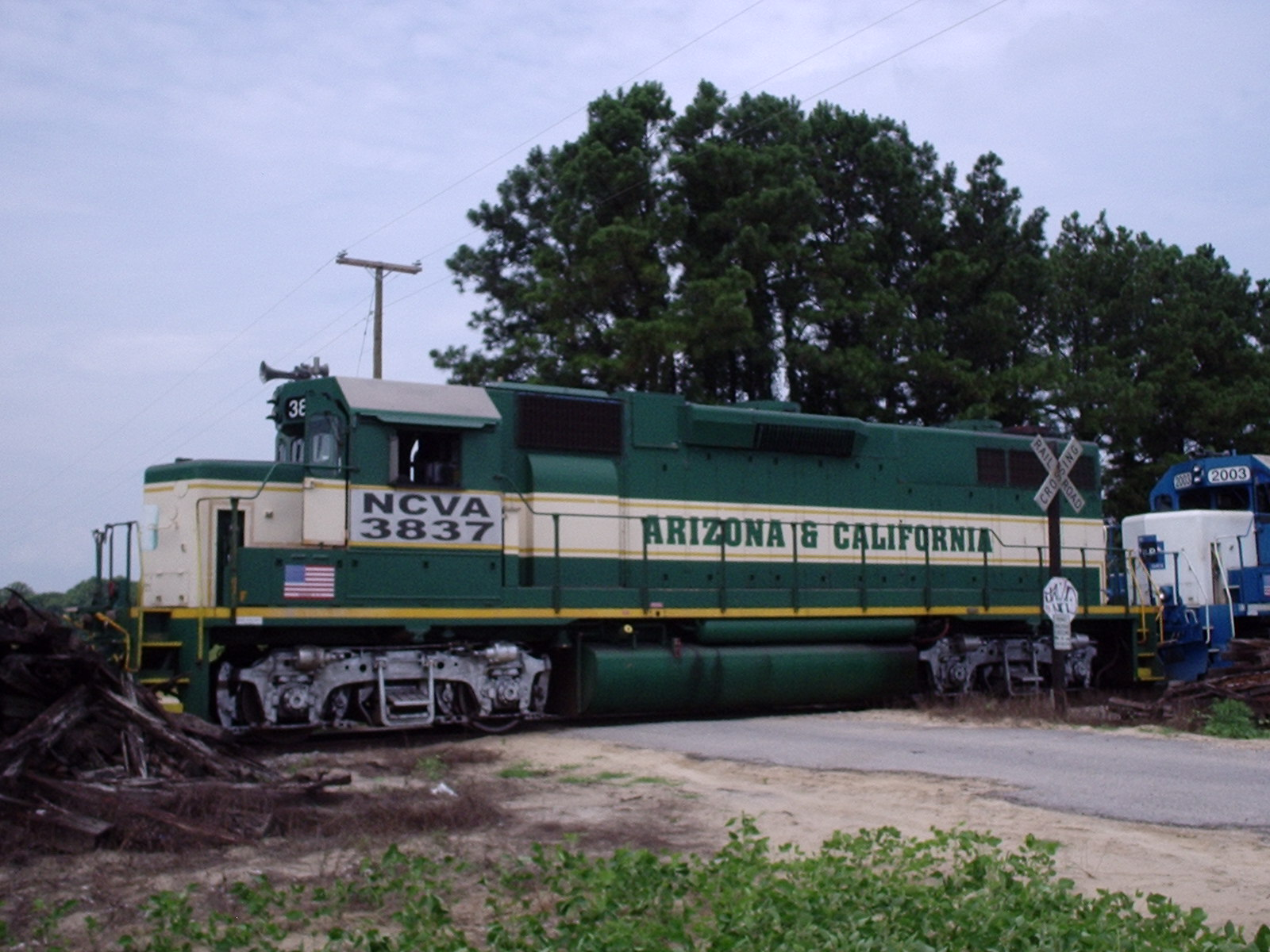
- An NCVA EMD GP38 locomotive, painted in the colors of the Arizona and California Railroad

Overview
- Parent company: Genesee and Wyoming
- Headquarters: Ahoskie, North Carolina
- Reporting mark: NCVA
- Locale: Boykins, VA to Cofield, NC
- Dates of operation: 1987–present

Technical
- Track gauge: 4 ft 8 1/2 in (1,435 mm) standard gauge
- Length: 63 miles (101 km)

Other
- Website: Official website

The North Carolina and Virginia Railroad (reporting mark NCVA) is a short-line railroad operating in the U.S. states of North Carolina and Virginia. Formed in 1987 to operate a CSX Transportation branch, the NCVA operates 63 miles (101 km) of track. It is a subsidiary of Genesee & Wyoming. The company primarily hauls steel, grain, and chemicals, and reported 25,000 carloads hauled in 2008.

== History ==
The North Carolina and Virginia Railroad was founded in November 1987, when shortline holding company RailTex purchased from CSX Transportation 52 miles (84 km) of former Seaboard Coast Line Railroad trackage between Boykins, Virginia and Tunis in Cofield, North Carolina. As part of the purchase, CSX sold two EMD GP9 locomotives to the NCVA, though by 1988 only one, built in 1957, was used for train operations. The company started out with six employees and headquarters in Ahoskie, North Carolina.

A significant customer for the railroad is a Nucor steel mill in Hertford, which the state of North Carolina asserted chose its location because service was available from the NCVA.

The NCVA is a subsidiary of the Genesee & Wyoming and was previously owned by RailAmerica.

The railroad's traffic comes mainly from steel products, as well as grain and chemical products. The NCVA hauled around 25,500 carloads in 2008. As of 2024, the NCVA operates 63 miles (101 km) of trackage, with 60 miles (97 km) in North Carolina and the remainder in Virginia. It interchanges with CSX at Boykins.

== See also ==
- Chesapeake and Albemarle Railroad
- Virginia Southern Railroad
