= New River Railroad =

Railroad in Virginia, U.S.

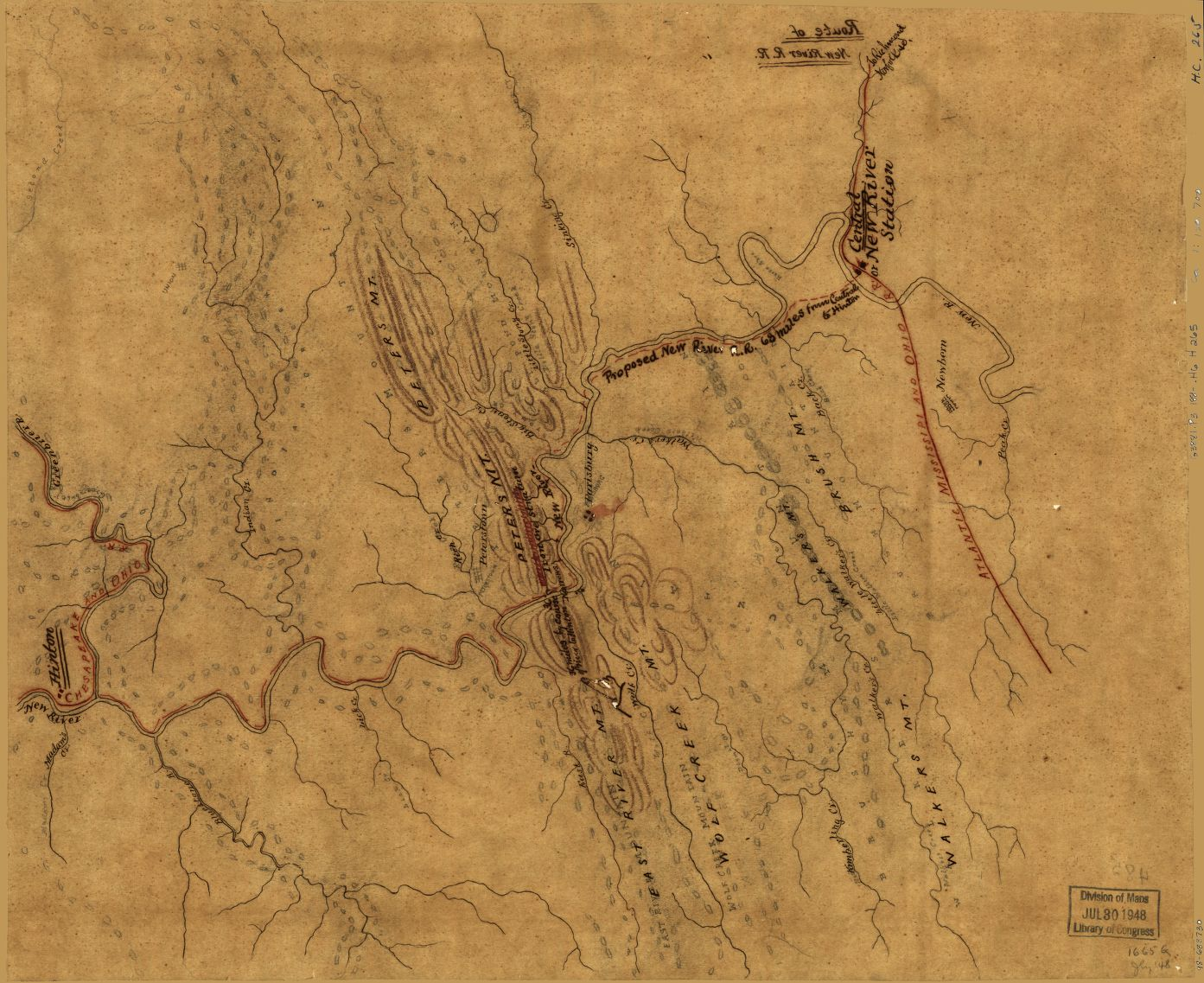
- New River Railroad Map: Proposed Railroad Route.

Overview
- Headquarters: Philadelphia, Pennsylvania
- Locale: Hinton, Virginia
- Dates of operation: 1877–1882 (purchased by Norfolk and Western Railroad in 1882)
- Successor: Norfolk and Western Railroad

Technical
- Track gauge: 5 ft (1,524 mm) gauge
- Length: 64 mi (103 km)

The New River Railroad was founded as the New River Mining and Railroad Company on May 24, 1874, at the Montgomery White Sulphur Springs, in Virginia. Construction of the railroad began on September 16 at the New River Depot on the Atlantic, Mississippi and Ohio Railroad.

== Route ==
The railroad route travels north through Virginia and down the New River valley to the Chesapeake and Ohio Railway on the mouth of the Greenbrier River.

== History ==
The company issued and sold $4 million of stock to pay for the railroad. The development of the railroad revealed multiple coal seams along its route. The company established its headquarters in Philadelphia, Pennsylvania. Mining companies could own stocks, and counties affected by the railroad could sell bonds or levy taxes to buy stock or pay off the bonds.

J. Dickenson Sergeant, Thomas Graham, Richard Wood, Henry Beckwith, S. H. Newbery, William Firmstone, R. F. Hoke, P. H. McCaull, P. W. Strother, and Richard B. Roane were the founders of the railroad. William Firmstone, an industrialist and engineer, died three years after incorporating the company in 1877. He had rebuilt the furnace of Glendon Iron Company to modernize it. Frank Firmstone, his son, modernized two more furnaces. Another of his sons, Harry Firmstone, was the first engineer in Virginia to use coke to make pig iron in 1874. The high-grade coke that made this possible came from the New River. P. H. McCaull was a delegate to the Virginia House of Delegates and a County Clerk of Roanoke County in 1887; McCaull was a Republican who wrote to William Mahone in 1877 that an election had been lost due to a law that gave Democrats control of voting rolls. P. W. Strother was also a Delegate. Richard B. Roane, a Superintendent, was married to a relative of Sam Houston.

In 1878, Frederick W. M. Holliday, the Governor of Virginia, provided prisoners to work on the railroad system. Many of these were wrongfully convicted, innocent men used for convict leasing to the New River Railroad. The state would subsidize the cost of clothes, food, medical expenses, and guards for the men equivalent to what the state would pay if the men had stayed in prison. In return, the railroad would pay back these expenses each year with railroad bonds along with six percent interest.

On December 23, 1881, the New River Railroad and Mining and Manufacturing Company merged with Bluefield Railroad to form the New River Railroad of West Virginia.

These railroads were the foundation for the Norfolk and Western Railway, New River Division. Norfolk and Western Railway President Frederick J. Kimball bought the New River Railroad and transformed the railroad system from one that just transported agricultural products to one that made significant profits from coal by opening the Pocahontas Coalfield in western Virginia and southern West Virginia.
