= Virginia–Carolina Railway =

Railway in Virginia and North Carolina

Overview
- Locale: North Carolina; Virginia
- Dates of operation: 1887–1977

Technical
- Track gauge: 4 ft 8 1/2 in (1,435 mm) standard gauge

The Virginia–Carolina Railway was an interstate railroad in southwestern Virginia and northwestern North Carolina. It ran from Abingdon in Washington County, Virginia to Todd in Ashe County, North Carolina. The line charted a complicated course through the mountains of the area, crossing the Blue Ridge not far from Mount Rogers.

== History ==
Construction of the railroad was begun in 1887 by the Abingdon Coal and Iron Railroad, but the company folded before the railroad became operational. Construction was continued by the Virginia Western Coal and Iron Railway in 1894, and it was renamed the Virginia–Carolina Railway in 1898, but financial difficulties persisted. The Norfolk and Western Railway funded construction to Damascus, which was completed in 1900. In 1906, the line had reached Taylor's Valley, Virginia. The Hassinger Lumber Company, whose mill was seven miles away in Konnarock, Virginia, built the Virginia-Carolina and Southern Railway to make this connection. Later, the V-C&S would be absorbed into the V-C, which used it as a branch line to the mill. The V-C was extended through the Blue Ridge Mountains to White Top in 1912 and to its terminus by 1920. The Norfolk and Western absorbed the line in 1919 and operated it as its Abingdon branch until 1977, when operations ceased after flooding damaged portions of the track. Most of the former roadbed in Virginia is occupied by the Virginia Creeper Trail. Efforts are underway to extend the trail into North Carolina.
