= Chesapeake and Albemarle Railroad =

Class III railroad in North Carolina and Virginia

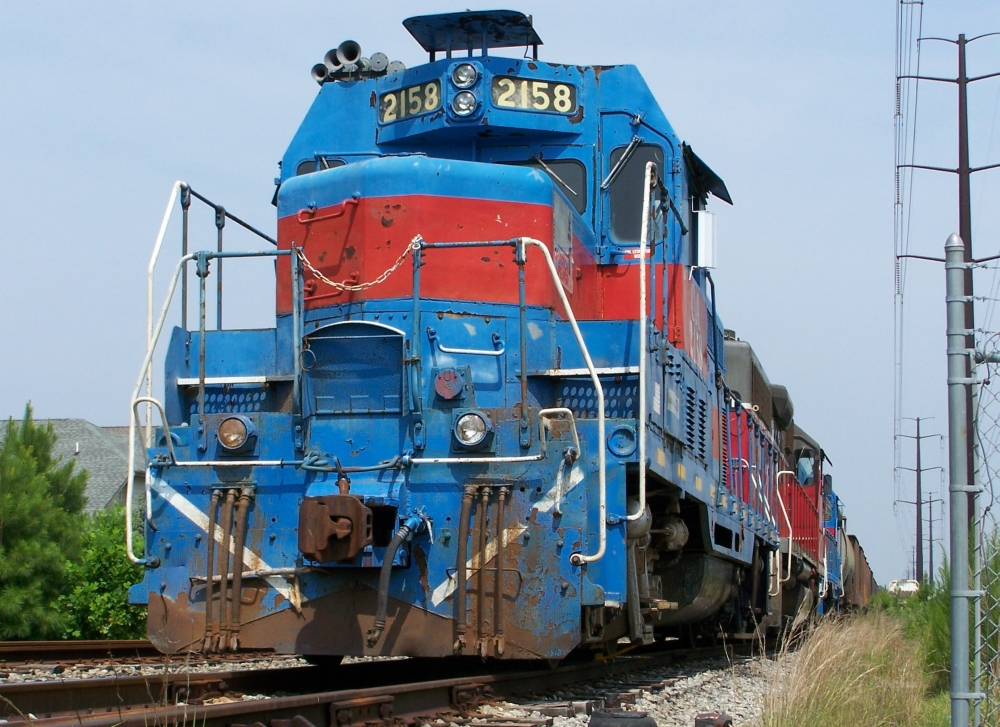
- CA #2158 in Chesapeake, Virginia.

Overview
- Fleet: CA 502 (EMD GP38-2) CA 2116 (EMD GP38-2) CA 3557 (EMD GP38-2)
- Parent company: Genesee and Wyoming
- Headquarters: Ahoskie, North Carolina
- Reporting mark: CA
- Locale: Chesapeake, Virginia to Edenton, North Carolina
- Dates of operation: 1990–present
- Predecessor: Norfolk Southern Railroad

Technical
- Track gauge: 4 ft 8+1/2in (1,435 mm), standard gauge
- Length: 78 miles (126 km)

Other
- Website: www.gwrr.com/ca

The Chesapeake and Albemarle Railroad (reporting mark CA) is a short-line railroad that operates 78 miles (126 km) of track from Chesapeake, Virginia, to Edenton, North Carolina.

== History ==
The railroad was originally part of the Norfolk Southern Railroad, which continued south, crossing the Albemarle Sound and on to Mackeys Ferry and Plymouth. The railroad was started as part of Norfolk Southern's Thoroughbred Shortline Program, where low density lines were handed over to shortline operators. The current railroad began operations in 1990, was acquired by RailAmerica in 2000, and subsequently acquired by the Genesee & Wyoming in 2012. With the acquisition of the railroad by Genesee & Wyoming, the railroad made the decision to lower track speeds from 25-35mph to 10-25mph.

The railroad was fined around $15,100 for a spill of diesel fuel in August 2010 after a derailment on 26 March 2010 spilled around 1,000 US gallons (3,800 L) of fuel into the Intracoastal Waterway.

In 2022 and 2023, the line was given money from the North Carolina government as part of a wider plan to help improve infrastructure on shortline railroads in the state.

On June 17, 2024, the line was closed indefinitely following a train derailment in Chesapeake. The line will be out of service for an unknown duration until the incident is handled, as the National Transportation Safety Board was notified, and repairs are made.

== Services ==
C&A interchanges with both Norfolk Southern Railway, CSX Transportation, and the Norfolk and Portsmouth Belt Line Railroad. The railroad's traffic comes mainly from stone and chemical products, along with smaller amounts of potash, lumber, and cement. The CA hauled around 3,300 carloads in 2008. Some of the main businesses on the line are Vulcan Materials in Elizabeth City, aprocessor of aggregate stone; Universal Forest Products in Elizabeth City, distributor of forest products; and FP Wood Grain Co. of Camden, a distributor of agricultural commodities.
