= Covington and Ohio Railroad =

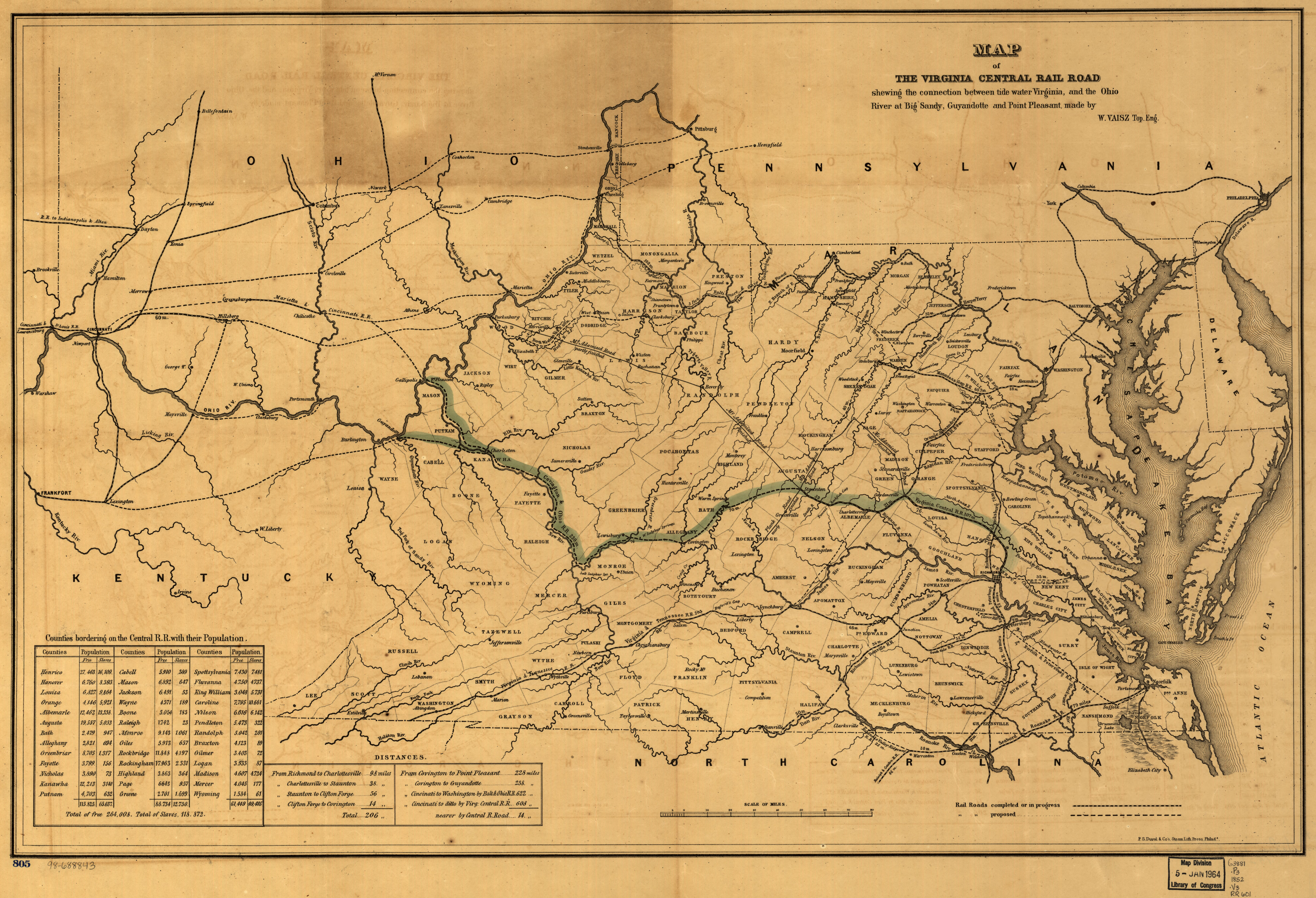
- 1852 map showing the planned Covington and Ohio Railroad and the Virginia Central Railroad

Overview
- Locale: Virginia, United States
- Successor: Chesapeake and Ohio Railway

Covington and Ohio Railroad was part of a planned railroad link between Eastern Virginia and the Ohio River in the 1850s. The mountainous region of the Allegheny Front (eastern side) of the Appalachian Plateau between an existing canal, railroads and navigable rivers represented a formidable obstacle.

The railroad was never formally incorporated. Instead, it became part of the Chesapeake and Ohio Railway in 1868. Under the leadership of Williams Carter Wickham and Collis P. Huntington, it opened to through traffic in 1873.

In the early 21st century, the tracks form a vital portion of the rail network for CSX Transportation as part of a pathway from the bituminous coal mines of West Virginia to the coal piers at Newport News, Virginia.

== Historical transportation need ==
Beginning in the 18th century, for purposes of shipping goods and passenger transportation, Virginians had long sought a canal or railroad link between the navigable rivers which drain to the Chesapeake Bay and the Atlantic Ocean at the Fall Line and the Ohio River, which leads to the Mississippi River and the Gulf of Mexico. As a surveyor, George Washington had mapped out several potential routes, and in 1785, he had been an early investor in a canal venture. The James River and Kanawha Canal was the last final effort to do so by canal, and was partially completed. However, after 1830, emerging railroad technology made it increasingly clear that it offered a better solution to providing the desired link.

== Virginia Central Railroad ==
The early railroads in Virginia were privately owned, but often received partial state-funding through investments by the Virginia Board of Public Works, which was always keen to help with internal improvements in the state's transportation infrastructure. The Virginia Central Railroad, earlier known as the Louisa Railroad, had been formed in 1836 and was one of the state's oldest railroads. 40% of its stock was owned by the Virginia Board of Public Works. By the 1850s, it extended westerly from Richmond on the fall line of the James River through the Piedmont region of Virginia.

A plan was developed to extend the Virginia Central across the Blue Ridge Mountains and into the Shenandoah Valley and points west. However, the railroad had found that a planned crossing of the Blue Ridge Mountains at Swift Run Gap was financially unfeasible.

== Blue Ridge Railroad ==
To protect its investment and enable transportation, the Virginia General Assembly then incorporated and financed a new entity, the Blue Ridge Railroad, to accomplish the hard and expensive task of crossing the Blue Ridge mountain barrier to the west. Rather than attempting the more formidable Swift Run Gap, under the leadership of the great early civil engineer Claudius Crozet, the state-owned Blue Ridge Railroad built over the mountains at the next gap to the south, Rockfish Gap near Afton Mountain, using four tunnels, including the 4,263-foot Blue Ridge Tunnel at the top of the pass, then one of the longest tunnels in the world. The tunnel was 'holed-through' on Christmas Day, 1856, and was less than six inches off perfect alignment, as construction had proceeded from either end. Rail service didn't begin until April 1858, although temporary tracks over the top of the gap were in operation as early as 1854. Due to the extreme grade, the first train to cross over the mountain wrecked on its return journey eastwards the following day. The Blue Ridge Tunnel eliminated this grade. As a corporate entity, the Blue Ridge Railroad ceased to exist when the tunnels were completed, becoming part of the Virginia Central Railroad. (During the American Civil War, the tunnels were utilized as part of the so-called foot cavalry movements of the Confederate troops of General Stonewall Jackson).

== Covington to the Ohio River ==
In the 1850s, it became clear that the biggest obstacle to a thorough route to the Ohio River between the existing canal, railroads and navigable rivers was the rugged terrain of the Allegheny Front (eastern side) of the Appalachian Plateau (an area known in old Virginia as the "Transmountaine" region) to reach the Kanawha River (a tributary of the Ohio River).

In 1853, the Virginia General Assembly passed legislation authorizing the Board of Public Works to construct a railroad from Covington to the Ohio River. Planned for future incorporation and sale of stock, the project was called the Covington and Ohio Railroad, but construction was commenced with state funds appropriations. Important grading work on the Alleghany grade and considerable work on numerous tunnels over the mountains and in the west was done. It also did a good deal of roadway work around Charleston on the Kanawha River. However, the work was interrupted by the American Civil War.

After the War, state funds were no longer available for the project. Virginia's pre-war debt became a major political issue and allocation of a fair portion became a source of conflict with the new state of West Virginia, which was broken off in 1863. Prior to 1861, the State had purchased a total of $48,000,000 worth of stock in transportation improvements, many of which were heavily damaged or destroyed during the Civil War. For several decades after the War, the two states disputed the new state's share of the Virginia government's debt. The issue was finally settled in 1915, when the United States Supreme Court ruled that West Virginia owed Virginia $12,393,929.50. The final installment of this sum was paid off in 1939.

However, immediately after the War, both states wanted to encourage completion of the Covington and Ohio line. To do without government funding, the state legislatures of both Virginia and West Virginia authorized incorporation of the Covington and Ohio Railroad in 1866 and again in 1867. However, with no state funds were available to subsidize the project, the offer found no takers. Instead, under a plan offered by the Virginia General Assembly, in 1868, the existing project was merged with the extant Virginia Central Railroad to form a new enterprise to be known as the Chesapeake and Ohio Railway (C&O).

== Forming the Chesapeake and Ohio Railway ==
The head of the Virginia Central Railroad was former Confederate General Williams Carter Wickham. After failing to find southern or British financing, he went to New York City. There, he successfully attracted both industrialist Collis P. Huntington and new financing. The final spike ceremony for the 428-mile-long line from Richmond to the Ohio River was held on January 29, 1873, at Hawk's Nest railroad bridge in the New River Valley, near the town of Ansted in Fayette County, West Virginia.

== Coal to Newport News ==
Huntington was also aware of the potential to ship eastbound coal from West Virginia's untapped natural resources with the completion of the new railroad. His agents began acquiring property in Warwick County in Eastern Virginia. In the 1880s, he oversaw extension of the C&O's new Peninsula Subdivision, which extended from the Church Hill Tunnel in Richmond southeast down the peninsula through Williamsburg to Newport News, where the company developed coal piers on the harbor of Hampton Roads, to extend the C&O to what would become new coal piers at Newport News.

== Modern use ==
In modern times, portions of the former Covington and Ohio Railroad are in use by CSX Transportation.

== See also ==
- Virginia Central Railroad
- Blue Ridge Railroad
- Chesapeake and Ohio Railway
