= List of North Carolina railroads =

The following railroads operate in the U.S. state of North Carolina.

== Common freight carriers ==
- Aberdeen, Carolina and Western Railway (ACWR)
- Aberdeen and Rockfish Railroad (AR)
- Alexander Railroad (ARC)
- Atlantic and Western Railway (ATW)
- Blue Ridge Southern Railroad (BLU)
- Caldwell County Railroad (CWCY)
- Cape Fear Railways (CF)
- Carolina Coastal Railway (CLNA)
  - (Operates the Nash County Railroad)
- Chesapeake and Albemarle Railroad (CA)
- Clinton Terminal Railroad (CTR)
- CSX Transportation (CSXT)
- Great Smoky Mountains Railroad (GSM)
- High Point, Thomasville and Denton Railroad (HPTD)
- Kinston Railroad (KR), formerly the Kinston and Snow Hill Railroad (KSH)
- Laurinburg and Southern Railroad (LRS)
- Norfolk Southern Railway (NS) including subsidiaries Camp Lejeune Railroad (CPLJ) and State University Railroad (SUR)
  - (Operates the North Carolina Railroad) (NCRR)
- North Carolina and Virginia Railroad (NCVA)
- R.J. Corman Carolina Lines (RJCS)
- Thermal Belt Railway (TBRY)
- Virginia Southern Railroad (VSRR)
- Wilmington Terminal Railroad (WTRY)
- Winston-Salem Southbound Railway (WSS)
- Yadkin Valley Railroad (YVRR)

== Passenger carriers ==
- Amtrak (AMTK)
- Charlotte Trolley
- Craggy Mountain Line
- Great Smoky Mountains Railroad
- Handy Dandy Railroad
- New Hope Valley Railway
- North Carolina Transportation Museum
- Lynx Blue Line
- Red Springs & Northern Railroad
- Tweetsie Railroad

== Defunct railroads ==
Name	Mark	System (Note: This is one or more of the Class I railroads that the railroad became part of, if any.)	From	To	Successor	Notes
Aberdeen and Asheboro Railroad		NS	1897	1912	Raleigh, Charlotte and Southern Railway	
Aberdeen and Briar Patch Railway	ABPR		1983	1987	Aberdeen, Carolina and Western Railway	
Aberdeen and West End Railroad		NS	1889	1897	Aberdeen and Asheboro Railroad	
Air Line Railroad in South Carolina		SOU	1868	1870	Atlanta and Richmond Air–Line Railway	
Albemarle and Pantego Railroad		NS	1887	1891	Norfolk and Southern Railroad	
Albemarle and Raleigh Railroad		ACL	1883	1894	Wilmington and Weldon Railroad	
Alma Railway				1911	Maxton, Alma and Southbound Railroad	
Appalachian Railway			1908	1935	N/A	
Asheboro and Montgomery Railroad		NS	1896	1897	Aberdeen and Asheboro Railroad	
Asheville and Craggy Mountain Railway		SOU	1889	1941	Southern Railway	
Asheville Southern Railway		SOU	1905	1941	Southern Railway	
Asheville and Spartanburg Railroad		SOU	1881	1902	Southern Railway – Carolina Division	
Atlanta and Charlotte Air Line Railway		SOU	1877	1996	Norfolk Southern Railway	
Atlanta, Knoxville and Northern Railway		L&N	1896	1905	Louisville and Nashville Railroad	
Atlanta and Richmond Air–Line Railway		SOU	1870	1876	North Carolina Air–Line Railway	
Atlantic and Carolina Railroad			1914	1948	N/A	
Atlantic Coast Line Railroad	ACL	ACL	1898	1967	Seaboard Coast Line Railroad	
Atlantic and Danville Railway	AD	N&W	1889	1962	Norfolk, Franklin and Danville Railway	
Atlantic and East Carolina Railway	AEC	SOU	1939	2003	Norfolk Southern Railway	
Atlantic and French Broad Valley Railroad		SOU	1881	1882	Carolina, Cumberland Gap and Chicago Railway	
Atlantic and North Carolina Company		NS	1905	1906	Norfolk and Southern Railway	
Atlantic and North Carolina Railroad	ANC	NS	1852	1989	North Carolina Railroad	
Atlantic, Tennessee and Ohio Railroad		SOU	1855	1894	Southern Railway	
Atlantic and Western Railroad			1889	1927	Atlantic and Western Railway	
Atlantic and Yadkin Railway		SOU	1899	1950	Southern Railway	
Beaufort and Morehead Railroad	BMH		1937	1998	North Carolina Railroad	
Beaufort and Morehead Railway	BMH		1991	2002	Carolina Rail Services	
Black Mountain Railway		ACL/ L&N	1910	1955	Yancey Railroad	
Blue Ridge and Atlantic Railway		SOU	1901	1909	Tallulah Falls Railway	
Bonlee and Western Railway			1908	1932	N/A	
Caldwell and Northern Railroad		SOU	1893	1910	Carolina and Northwestern Railway	
Cape Fear and Northern Railway		SCL	1898	1903	Durham and Southern Railway	
Cape Fear and Yadkin Valley Railway		ACL, SOU	1879	1898	Atlantic and Yadkin Railway, Wilmington and Weldon Railroad	
Carolina Railroad		NS	1912	1931	N/A	
Carolina, Atlantic and Western Railway		SAL	1914	1915	Seaboard Air Line Railway	
Carolina Central Railroad		SAL	1880	1901	Seaboard Air Line Railway	
Carolina Central Railway		SAL	1873	1880	Carolina Central Railroad	
Carolina, Clinchfield and Ohio Railway	CC&O	ACL/ L&N	1908	1990	CSX Transportation	
Carolina Coast Railroad		NS	1903	1906	Norfolk and Southern Railway	
Carolina, Cumberland Gap and Chicago Railway		SOU	1882	1895	N/A	Sold at foreclosure; no property in North Carolina
Carolina and Georgia Railway			1919	1927	Tennessee and North Carolina Railway	
Carolina, Glenanna and Pee Dee Railway and Development Company		ACL/ N&W	1905	1907	Carolina Valley Railway	
Carolina Narrow-gauge Railroad		SOU	1872	1873	Chester and Lenoir Narrow Gauge Railroad	
Carolina and Northeastern Railroad			1917	1931	Carolina and Northeastern Railway	
Carolina and Northeastern Railway			1931	1934	N/A	
Carolina Northern Railroad		SAL	1899	1905	Raleigh and Charleston Railroad	
Carolina and Northwestern Railway	CRN	NS	1994		Caldwell County Railroad	Line from Hickory to Lenoir purchased by Caldwell County Economic Development Commission; Leased to CWCY.
Carolina and Northwestern Railway	CRN	SOU	1982	1988	Southern Railway	
Carolina and Northwestern Railway	CRN	SOU	1897	1974	Norfolk Southern Railway	
Carolina Rail Services	CRIJ		1986	2005	Morehead and South Fork Railroad	
Carolina Southern Railway			1926	1961	N/A	
Carolina and Tennessee Southern Railway		SOU	1902	1944	N/A	
Carolina Valley Railway		ACL/ N&W	1907	1909	Piedmont Railway	
Carolina and Yadkin River Railway		ACL/ N&W	1912	1923	High Point, Thomasville and Denton Railroad	
Carthage Railroad			1886	1920	Randolph and Cumberland Railway	
Carthage and Pinehurst Railroad		NS	1907	1922	N/A	
Carthage and Western Railroad			1893			
Cashie and Chowan Railroad and Lumber Company			1883			
Cashie and Roanoke Railroad			1887	1893	Wellington and Powellsville Railroad	
Chapel Hill Iron Mountain Railroad		SOU	1873	1879	State University Railroad	
Charleston, Cincinnati and Chicago Railroad		ACL/ L&N, SOU	1886	1893	Ohio River and Charleston Railway	
Charlotte, Columbia and Augusta Railroad		SOU	1869	1894	Southern Railway	
Charlotte and South Carolina Railroad		SOU	1847	1869	Charlotte, Columbia and Augusta Railroad	
Chatham Railroad		SAL	1861	1871	Raleigh and Augusta Air Line Railroad	
Cheraw and Coalfields Railroad		ACL	1867	1868	Cheraw and Salisbury Railroad	
Cheraw and Darlington Railroad		ACL	1882	1898	Atlantic Coast Line Railroad	
Cheraw and Salisbury Railroad		ACL	1868	1882	Cheraw and Darlington Railroad	
Chester and Lenoir Narrow Gauge Railroad		SOU	1873	1897	Carolina and Northwestern Railway	
Chowan River Railway and Baltimore Steamboat Company		ACL	1883	1886	Chowan and Southern Railroad	
Chowan and Southern Railroad	ACL		1886	1889	Norfolk and Carolina Railroad	
Cliffside Railroad	CLIF		1905	1987	N/A	
Clinchfield Railroad	CRR	ACL/ L&N	1924	1983	Seaboard System Railroad	
Clinton and Faison Railroad		ACL	1881	1885	Clinton and Warsaw Railroad	
Clinton and Warsaw Railroad		ACL	1885	1888	Wilmington and Weldon Railroad	
Dan Valley and Yadkin River Railroad		SOU	1879	1880	North Carolina Midland Railroad	
Dan Valley and Yadkin River Narrow Gauge Railroad		SOU	1881	1883	North Carolina Midland Railroad	
Danville, Mocksville and Southwestern Railroad		SOU	1880	1899	Danville and Western Railway	
Danville and New River Railroad		SOU	1873	1890	Danville and Western Railway	
Danville and Western Railway	D&W	SOU	1891			
Dismal Swamp Railroad			1896	1941	N/A	
Dover and South Bound Railroad			1905	1930	N/A	
Dunn-Erwin Railway	DER		1987	1989	Aberdeen and Rockfish Railroad	
Durham and Charlotte Railroad		NS	1893	1912	Raleigh, Charlotte and Southern Railway	
Durham and Northern Railway		SAL	1887	1901	Seaboard Air Line Railway	
Durham and Roxboro Railroad		N&W	1885	1887	Lynchburg and Durham Railroad	
Durham and South Carolina Railroad		NS	1905	1993	New Hope Valley Railway	
Durham and Southern Railway	DS	SCL	1904	1981	Seaboard Coast Line Railroad	
Durham Union Station Company		N&W/ SAL/ SOU	1904	1965	N/A	
Duval Transportation of the Carolinas			1987	1987	Mid Atlantic Railroad	
East Carolina Railway		ACL	1898	1965	N/A	
East Carolina Land and Railway Company		ACL	1887	1894	Wilmington, Newbern and Norfolk Railroad	
East Tennessee and Western North Carolina Railroad	ETWN		1866	1950	N/A	
Edenton and Norfolk Railway		NS	1888	1902	Suffolk and Carolina Railway	
Egypt Railway		NS	1892	1910	Sanford and Troy Railroad	
Elizabeth City and Norfolk Railroad		NS	1870	1883	Norfolk Southern Railroad	
Elizabeth City and Western Railroad		NS	1899	1902	Suffolk and Carolina Railway	
Elkin and Alleghany Railroad			1920	1931	N/A	
Elkin and Alleghany Railway			1907	1919	Elkin and Alleghany Railroad	
Florence and Fayetteville Railroad		ACL	1862	1881	Cape Fear and Yadkin Valley Railway	
Franklin County Railroad			1985	1990		LRS subsidiary; operated ex-SAL Franklinton-Louisburg branch (originally Louisburg Railroad); to NCDOT after shutdown, trail lease/rail bank
French Broad Railroad			1919	1925	N/A (leased the Madison County Railway)	
Georgia, Carolina and Northern Railway		SAL	1887	1901	Seaboard Air Line Railway	
Georgia and North Carolina Railroad		L&N	1871	1887	Marietta and North Georgia Railway	
Glendon and Gulf Mining and Manufacturing Company		NS	1891	1896	Durham and Charlotte Railroad	
Goldsboro Union Station Company		ACL/ NS/ SOU	1908	1968	N/A	
Graham County Railroad	GC		1905	1984	N/A	
Great Smoky Mountains Railway	GSM		1988	1999	Great Smoky Mountains Railroad	
Greensville and Roanoke Railroad		ACL	1834	1855	Petersburg Railroad	
Greenville and French Broad Railroad		SOU	1855	1874	Spartanburg and Asheville Railroad	
Gumberry and Jackson Railroad and Lumber Company			1887	1896	Northampton and Hertford Railroad	
Halifax and Weldon Railroad		ACL	1834	1837	Wilmington and Raleigh Railroad	
Hendersonville and Brevard Railway, Telegraph and Telephone Company		SOU	1891	1897	Transylvania Railroad	
High Point and Randleman Railroad		SOU	1883	1887	High Point, Randleman, Asheboro and Southern Railroad	
High Point, Randleman, Asheboro and Southern Railroad		SOU	1887			Still exists as a lessor of the Norfolk Southern Railway
Hoffman and Troy Railroad			1883			
Howland Improvement Company		NS	1903	1905	Atlantic and North Carolina Company	
Jackson Springs Railroad		NS	1901	1907	Aberdeen and Asheboro Railroad	
Kinston Carolina Railroad		NS	1918	1929	N/A	
Kinston and Carolina Railroad		NS		1909	Kinston–Carolina Railroad and Lumber Company	
Kinston–Carolina Railroad and Lumber Company		NS	1910	1918	Kinston Carolina Railroad	
Kinston and Snow Hill Railroad		NS		1913	Carolina Railroad	
Lawndale Railway and Industrial Company			1903	1943	N/A	
Linville River Railroad			1896	1899	Linville River Railway	
Linville River Railway			1899	1940	N/A (owned by East Tennessee and Western North Carolina Railroad)	
Louisburg Railroad		SAL	1881	1901	Raleigh and Gaston Railroad	
Louisville and Nashville Railroad	L&N, LN	L&N	1905	1983	Seaboard System Railroad	
Lower Creek and Linville Valley Transportation Company		SOU	1891	1893	Caldwell and Northern Railroad	
Lynchburg and Durham Railroad		N&W	1887	1896	Norfolk, Lynchburg and Durham Railroad	
Madison County Railway			1910	1925	N/A	
Marietta and North Georgia Railway		L&N	1887	1895	Atlanta, Knoxville and Northern Railway	
Maxton, Alma and Southbound Railroad	MA&S		1911	1937	N/A	
Mid Atlantic Railroad	MRR		1987	1995	Carolina Southern Railroad	
Midland North Carolina Railway		ACL	1873	1884	Wilmington and Weldon Railroad	
Milton and Sutherlin Railroad			1876	1894	N/A	
Moore Central Railroad			1945	1948	N/A	
Moore Central Railway			1924	1945	Moore Central Railroad	
Moore County Railroad			1893	1904	N/A	
Mount Airy Railroad		SOU	1879	1879	Cape Fear and Yadkin Valley Railway	
Mount Airy and Eastern Railway			1899	1910	Virginia and Mount Airy Railway	
Mount Airy and Ore Knob Railroad		SOU	1871	1879	Mount Airy Railroad	
Mount Hope Valley Railroad		NS	1904	1905	Durham and South Carolina Railroad	
Norfolk and Carolina Railroad		ACL	1889	1900	Atlantic Coast Line Railroad	
Norfolk, Franklin and Danville Railway	NFD	N&W	1962	1983	Norfolk and Western Railway	
Norfolk, Lynchburg and Durham Railroad		N&W	1896	1896	Norfolk and Western Railroad	
Norfolk, Roanoke and Southern Railroad		N&W	1896	1896	Norfolk and Western Railroad	
Norfolk Southern Railroad	NS	NS	1910	1942	Norfolk Southern Railway	
Norfolk Southern Railroad		NS	1883	1891	Norfolk and Southern Railroad	
Norfolk and Southern Railroad		NS	1891	1906	Norfolk and Southern Railway	
Norfolk Southern Railway	NS	NS	1942	1982	Carolina and Northwestern Railway	
Norfolk and Southern Railway		NS	1906	1910	Norfolk Southern Railroad	
Norfolk and Western Railroad		N&W	1892	1896	Norfolk and Western Railway	
Norfolk and Western Railway	N&W, NW	N&W	1896	1998	Norfolk Southern Railway	
North Carolina Railroad		SOU	1849			Still exists as a lessor of the Norfolk Southern Railway
North Carolina Air–Line Railway		SOU	1877	1877	Atlanta and Charlotte Air Line Railway	
North Carolina Connecting Railway			1905	1907	Roanoke River Railway	
North Carolina Midland Railroad		SOU	1880			Still exists as a lessor of the Norfolk Southern Railway
North Carolina Mining, Manufacturing and Development Company		ACL/ N&W	1903	1905	Carolina, Glenanna and Pee Dee Railway and Development Company	
North Carolina Ports Railway Commission	NCPR		1979	2002	North Carolina State Ports Authority	
North and South Carolina Railroad		SOU	1899	1940	N/A	
North and South Carolina Railway		SAL	1910	1914	Carolina, Atlantic and Western Railway	
North Western North Carolina Railroad		SOU	1868	1894	Southern Railway	
Northampton and Hertford Railroad			1891	1908	Northampton and Hertford Railway	
Northampton and Hertford Railway			1909	1917	Carolina and Northeastern Railroad	
Ohio River and Charleston Railway		ACL/ L&N, SOU	1894	1902	South Carolina and Georgia Extension Railroad, South and Western Railway	
Oxford and Clarksville Railroad		SOU	1885	1894	Southern Railway	
Oxford and Coast Line Railroad		SAL	1891	1906	Seaboard Air Line Railway	
Oxford and Henderson Railroad		SOU	1871	1894	Southern Railway	
Palmetto Railroad		SAL	1883	1895	Palmetto Railway	
Palmetto Railway		SAL	1895	1901	Seaboard Air Line Railway	
Pee Dee Valley Railway		ACL	1909	1910	Rockingham Railway	
Petersburg Railroad		ACL	1831	1898	Atlantic Coast Line Railroad	
Piedmont Railroad		SOU	1862	1894	Southern Railway	
Piedmont Railway		ACL/ N&W	1909	1912	Carolina and Yadkin River Railway	
Piedmont and Northern Railway	P&N		1914	1969	Seaboard Coast Line Railroad	Electric until 1954
Pigeon River Railway			1906	1931	N/A	
Pittsboro Railroad		SAL	1885	1899	Raleigh and Augusta Air Line Railroad	
Portsmouth and Roanoke Railroad		SAL	1833	1846	Seaboard and Roanoke Railroad	
Raleigh and Augusta Air Line Railroad		SAL	1871	1901	Seaboard Air Line Railway	
Raleigh and Cape Fear Railway		NS	1898	1905	Raleigh and Southport Railway	
Raleigh, Charlotte and Southern Railway		NS	1911	1913	Norfolk Southern Railroad	
Raleigh and Charleston Railroad		SAL	1906	1941	N/A	
Raleigh and Eastern North Carolina Railroad		NS	1903	1903	Raleigh and Pamlico Sound Railroad	
Raleigh and Gaston Railroad		SAL	1835	1901	Seaboard Air Line Railway	
Raleigh and Pamlico Sound Railroad		NS	1903	1906	Norfolk and Southern Railway	
Raleigh and Southport Railway		NS	1905	1912	Raleigh, Charlotte and Southern Railway	
Raleigh and Western Railway		NS	1893	1908	N/A	Leased the Egypt Railway
Randolph and Cumberland Railroad			1906	1907	Randolph and Cumberland Railway	
Randolph and Cumberland Railway			1907	1924	Moore Central Railway	
Richmond and Danville Railroad		SOU	1866	1894	Southern Railway	
Richmond, Petersburg and Carolina Railroad		SAL	1892	1900	Seaboard Air Line Railway	
Roanoke Railroad		SAL	1847	1849	Seaboard and Roanoke Railroad	
Roanoke River Railway			1907	1919	Townsville Railroad	
Roanoke and Southern Railway		N&W	1887	1896	Norfolk, Roanoke and Southern Railroad	
Roanoke and Tar River Railroad		SAL	1885	1911	Seaboard Air Line Railway	
Roanoke Valley Railroad			1855	1863	N/A	
Rockingham Railroad	RKG	ACL	1910	1968	N/A	
Rockingham Railway		ACL	1910	1910	Rockingham Railroad	
Roxboro Railroad		N&W	1881	1887	Lynchburg and Durham Railroad	
Roxboro and Narrow Gauge Railroad		N&W	1879	1881	Roxboro Railroad	
Rutherfordton, Marion and Tennessee Railway		ACL/ L&N, SOU	1881	1886	Charleston, Cincinnati and Chicago Railroad	
Sanford and Glendon Railroad		NS		1910	Sanford and Troy Railroad	
Sanford and Troy Railroad		NS	1910	1912	Raleigh, Charlotte and Southern Railway	
Seaboard Air Line Railroad	SAL	SAL	1946	1967	Seaboard Coast Line Railroad	
Seaboard Air Line Railway		SAL	1900	1945	Seaboard Air Line Railroad	
Seaboard Air Line System		SAL	1893	1900	Seaboard Air Line Railway	
Seaboard Coast Line Railroad	SCL		1967	1983	Seaboard System Railroad	
Seaboard and Raleigh Railroad		ACL	1873	1883	Albemarle and Raleigh Railroad	
Seaboard and Roanoke Railroad		SAL	1846	1911	Seaboard Air Line Railway	
Seaboard System Railroad	SBD		1983	1986	CSX Transportation	
Smoky Mountain Railway	SMN		1905	1927	N/A	
South Carolina and Georgia Extension Railroad		SOU	1898	1902	Southern Railway – Carolina Division	
South and Western Railroad		ACL/ L&N	1905	1908	Carolina, Clinchfield and Ohio Railway	
South and Western Railway		ACL/ L&N	1901	1906	South and Western Railroad	
Southeastern Railroad		ACL	1897	1900	Atlantic Coast Line Railroad	
Southern Railway	SOU	SOU	1894	1990	Norfolk Southern Railway	
Southern Railway – Carolina Division		SOU	1902	1996	Norfolk Southern Railway	
Spartanburg and Asheville Railroad		SOU	1874	1881	Asheville and Spartanburg Railroad	
Statesville and Western Railroad		SOU	1887	1894	Southern Railway	
Suffolk and Carolina Railway		NS	1884	1906	Norfolk and Southern Railway	
Tallulah Falls Railway	TF	SOU	1909	1961	N/A	
Tennessee and North Carolina Railroad			1903	1920	Tennessee and North Carolina Railway	
Tennessee and North Carolina Railway			1920	1951	N/A	
Town Creek Railroad and Lumber Company			1905	1911	Wilmington, Brunswick and Southern Railroad	
Townsville Railroad			1919	1933	N/A	
Transylvania Railroad		SOU	1899			
Tuckaseegee and Southeastern Railway			1920	1945	N/A	
Virginia and Carolina Railroad		SAL	1883	1892	Richmond, Petersburg and Carolina Railroad	
Virginia–Carolina Railway		N&W	1911	1919	Norfolk and Western Railway	
Virginia and Carolina Southern Railroad		ACL	1903			
Virginia and Mount Airy Railway			1920		N/A	Never operated
Warrenton Railroad	WAR		1876	1985	N/A	
Washington and Plymouth Railroad		NS	1901	1904	Norfolk and Southern Railroad	
Washington and Vandemere Railroad		ACL	1903	1944	Atlantic Coast Line Railroad	
Weldon and Roanoke Rapids Electric Railway			1907	1917	Carolina and Northeastern Railroad	
Wellington and Powellsville Railroad			1893	1926	Carolina Southern Railway	
Western Railroad		ACL, SOU	1852	1879	Cape Fear and Yadkin Valley Railway	
Western North Carolina Railroad		SOU	1855	1894	Southern Railway	
Wilmington Railway Bridge Company		ACL/ SAL	1866	1956	Atlantic Coast Line Railroad, Seaboard Air Line Railroad	
Wilmington, Brunswick and Southern Railroad			1907	1945	N/A	
Wilmington and Carolina Railroad		ACL	1870	1870	Wilmington, Columbia and Augusta Railroad	
Wilmington, Chadbourn and Conway Railroad		ACL	1887	1895	Wilmington and Conway Railroad	
Wilmington, Chadbourn and Conwayboro Railroad		ACL	1883	1887	Wilmington, Chadbourn and Conway Railroad	
Wilmington and Charlotte Railroad		SAL	1855	1855	Wilmington, Charlotte and Rutherford Railroad	
Wilmington, Charlotte and Rutherford Railroad		SAL	1855	1873	Carolina Central Railroad	
Wilmington, Columbia and Augusta Railroad		ACL	1870	1898	Atlantic Coast Line Railroad	
Wilmington and Conway Railroad		ACL	1895	1896	Wilmington, Columbia and Augusta Railroad	
Wilmington and Manchester Railroad		ACL	1847	1870	Wilmington and Carolina Railroad	
Wilmington and Newbern Railroad		ACL	1897	1897	Wilmington and Weldon Railroad	
Wilmington, Newbern and Norfolk Railroad		ACL	1893	1897	Wilmington and Newbern Railroad	
Wilmington, Onslow and East Carolina Railroad		ACL	1885	1893	Wilmington, Newbern and Norfolk Railroad	
Wilmington and Raleigh Railroad		ACL	1834	1855	Wilmington and Weldon Railroad	
Wilmington and Tarboro Railroad		ACL	1861	1873	Seaboard and Raleigh Railroad	
Wilmington and Weldon Railroad		ACL	1855	1900	Atlantic Coast Line Railroad	
Winston-Salem and Madison Railroad		SOU	1879	1880	North Carolina Midland Railroad	
Winston-Salem and Mooresville Railroad		SOU	1878	1880	North Carolina Midland Railroad	
Winston-Salem Terminal Company		ACL/ N&W/ SOU	1922	1972	Norfolk and Western Railway, Southern Railway, Winston-Salem Southbound Railway	
Winton Railroad and Lumber Company			1889			
Yadkin Railroad		SOU	1871			Still exists as a lessor of the Norfolk Southern Railway
Yancey Railroad	YAN		1955	1982	N/A	

Electric railways

- Asheville and East Tennessee Railroad
- Asheville Electric Company
- Asheville Loop Line Railway
- Asheville Street Railway
- Carolina Power and Light Company
- Charlotte Electric Railway, Light and Power Company
- Cumberland Railway and Power Company
- Durham Traction Company
- Fayetteville Street Railway
- Fries Manufacturing and Power Company
- North Carolina Public Service Company
- Piedmont and Northern Railway (P&N)
- Piedmont Traction Company
- Salisbury and Spencer Railway
- Tidewater Power Company
- Wilmington Sea Coast Railroad

Private carriers

- Blackwood Lumber Company
- Butters Lumber Company
- Experimental Railroad
- Whiteville Lumber Company

Not completed

- Cincinnati and Charleston Railroad
- Louisville, Cincinnati and Charleston Railroad
