= Carolina Central Railroad =

Defunct railroad in North Carolina

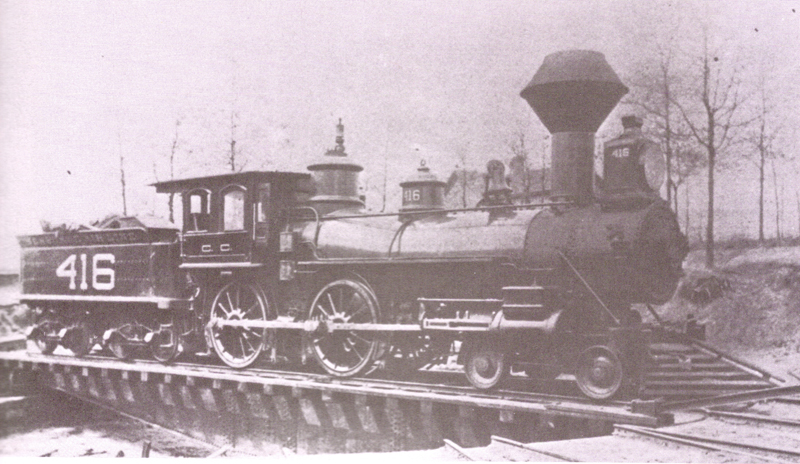
- Seaboard Air Line Railroad 416, formerly Carolina Central Railroad 26

Overview
- Locale: North Carolina
- Dates of operation: 1855–1900
- Predecessor: Wilmington, Charlotte and Rutherford Railroad
- Successor: Seaboard Air Line Railroad

Technical
- Length: 152 miles (245 km)

The Carolina Central Railroad, was a railway company in the United States. It was incorporated in 1855 as the Wilmington and Charlotte Railroad and was renamed the Wilmington, Charlotte and Rutherford Railroad shortly after. It was reorganized as the Carolina Central Railway in 1873. It built 152 miles (245 km) of track, in two unconnected sections, in the southern part of North Carolina. The company was again reorganized as the Carolina Central Railroad in 1880. In 1900, the Carolina Central Railroad was merged into the Seaboard Air Line Railroad. Its lines are now owned by CSX Transportation.

== History ==
=== Formation and early years ===
The Wilmington and Charlotte Railroad was incorporated on February 13, 1855, but the name was changed soon after to the Wilmington, Charlotte and Rutherford Railroad. The company intended to build a railway line from Wilmington, North Carolina, on the Atlantic Ocean, to Rutherford County, North Carolina, via Charlotte, North Carolina.

The company completed a 112-mile (180 km) line from Navassa, outside Wilmington, to Rockingham, in 1861. This line included a 78.8-mile (126.8 km)-long segment of straight track between Laurel Hill and East Arcadia, the longest such line in the United States. Separately, the company built a 31-mile (50 km) from Charlotte to Lincolnton, in the direction of Rutherford County. The outbreak of the American Civil War prevented any further construction from taking place. In 1870 an additional 7 miles (11 km) opened between Rockingham and Pee Dee, on the Pee Dee River, leaving the a 63-mile (101 km) gap between the two sections of the railroad.

When the east end of the line in Navassa was completed in 1861, it ran just north of Royster Road to its terminus at the Cape Fear River just south of the Interstate 140 bridge (both road locations as of 2023).

Following the outbreak of the Civil War, the government of the Confederate States of America chose to bolster railroads it deemed of strategic importance by recycling rails and equipment from lines viewed as less significant to the war effort. As a result, 10 miles of rails were stripped from the WC&R before the governor interceded to halt the practice. The railway thus remained operational through most of the war, though it ended with only one functional locomotive instead of the seven it had before the conflict broke out. In the closing phases of the war, belligerents on both sides sabotaged the railway, putting it out of operation. In the aftermath, the company received $3,000,000 in bonds issued by the state government to support its recovery.

In 1866, the Wilmington, Charlotte and Rutherford Railroad created the Wilmington Railway Bridge Company as a joint venture with the Wilmington and Manchester Railroad to build a bridge over the Cape Fear River. The bridge, which was jointly owned by both railroads, was completed in 1867 allowing both railroad to extend into central Wilmington. The company entered receivership in 1872 and was sold in 1873 to the Carolina Central Railway, which in 1874 completed the connection between Wilmington and Charlotte. The railroad finally reached Rutherford via a new extension of the line in 1877. The expansion of line allowed the company to become a significant freight carrier for cotton which was shipped from the Piedmont to Wilmington for export. Another change in corporate identity occurred in 1880, when the Carolina Central Railway became the Carolina Central Railroad, controlled by a predecessor of the Seaboard Air Line Railroad.

In 1896, a branch was built from Ellenboro south to Caroleen and the Henrietta Mill.

The Carolina Central Railroad was ultimately merged into the Seaboard Air Line Railroad in 1900.

=== Seaboard Air Line years ===
Wilmington and Monroe Subdivisions

Overview
- Status: Segments still operating under CSX
- Owner: Seaboard Air Line Railroad
- Termini: Wilmington, North Carolina; Rutherfordton, North Carolina

Technical
- Line length: 304.3 mi (489.7 km)
- Electrification: No

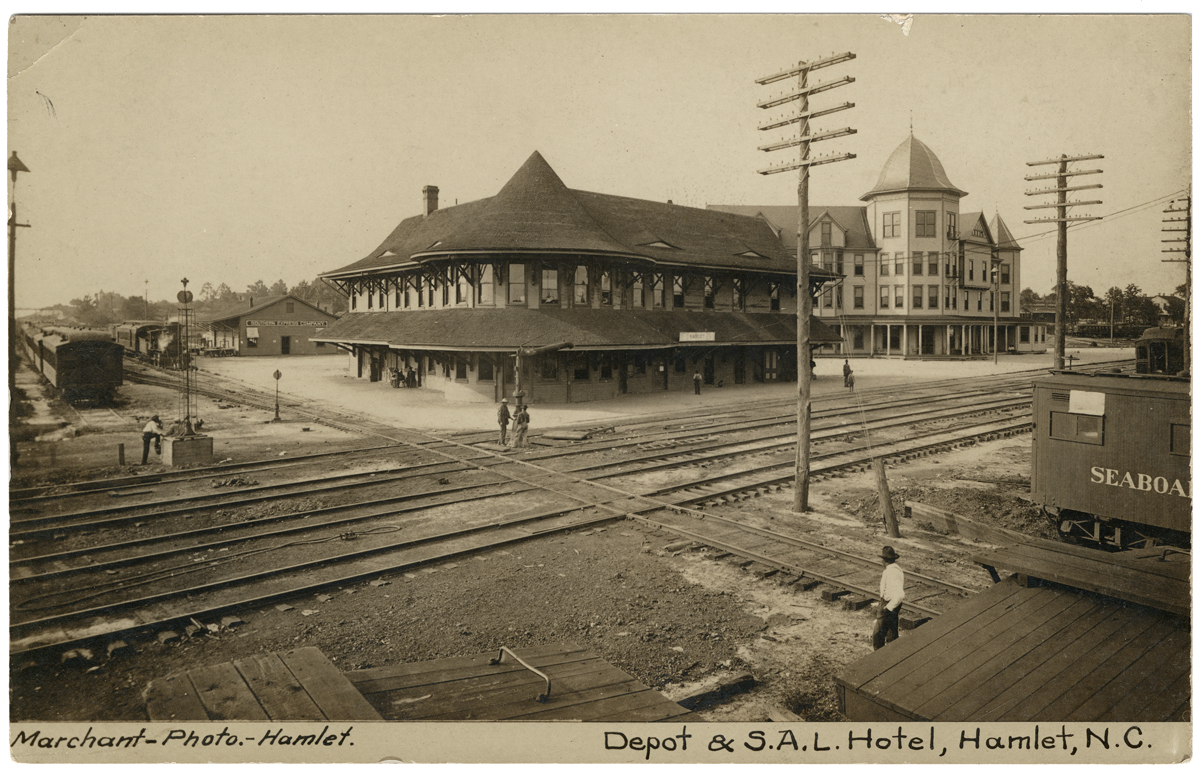
Seaboard Air Line Hamlet Passenger Depot in 1912.

The Seaboard Air Line Railroad operated the line as their Wilmington Subdivision east of Hamlet and as their Monroe Subdivision west of Hamlet to Rutherfordton. The branch to Caroleen was known as the Caroleen Subdivision. The line would be the Seaboard Air Line's only route to the port city of Wilmington, which by then was the headquarters and a major hub of their main competitor, the Atlantic Coast Line Railroad.

The Seaboard built their historic Hamlet station at the junction with the mainline in Hamlet which would become a major hub for the company. In the 1950s, the company was running a local passenger train from Wilmington to Charlotte daily. At the same time, Seaboard's New York City—Birmingham Silver Comet and The Cotton Blossom provided through passenger service between Hamlet and Monroe. They would diverge from the mainline at Hamlet before turning southward onto the Abbeville Subdivision toward Atlanta and Birmingham at Monroe. A first class Raleigh—Birmingham named freight train called The Capitol also followed this routing. On the Wilmington Subdivision, a through-freight train ran daily along with separate local freight trains which ran three days a week. On the Monroe Subdivision, the Tar Heel, a named freight train ran from Hamlet to Bostic daily along with separate local freight trains.

Seaboard discontinued its local passenger train from Wilmington to Charlotte in 1958, ending its passenger service to Wilmington.

=== Later years ===
In 1967, the Seaboard Air Line merged with its rival, the Atlantic Coast Line Railroad (ACL). The merged company was named the Seaboard Coast Line Railroad (SCL). Seaboard Coast Line continued operating the line as the Wilmington Subdivision and Monroe Subdivision. The Silver Comet was discontinued the following year.

In 1980, the Seaboard Coast Line's parent company merged with the Chessie System, creating the CSX Corporation. The CSX Corporation initially operated the Chessie and Seaboard Systems separately until 1986, when they were merged into CSX Transportation. CSX extended the Monroe Subdivision name from Monroe to Abbeville as it is today and truncated the Abbeville Subdivision to Abbeville. The former Monroe Subdivision west of Monroe towards Charlotte, North Carolina is now the Charlotte Subdivision.

== Current operations ==
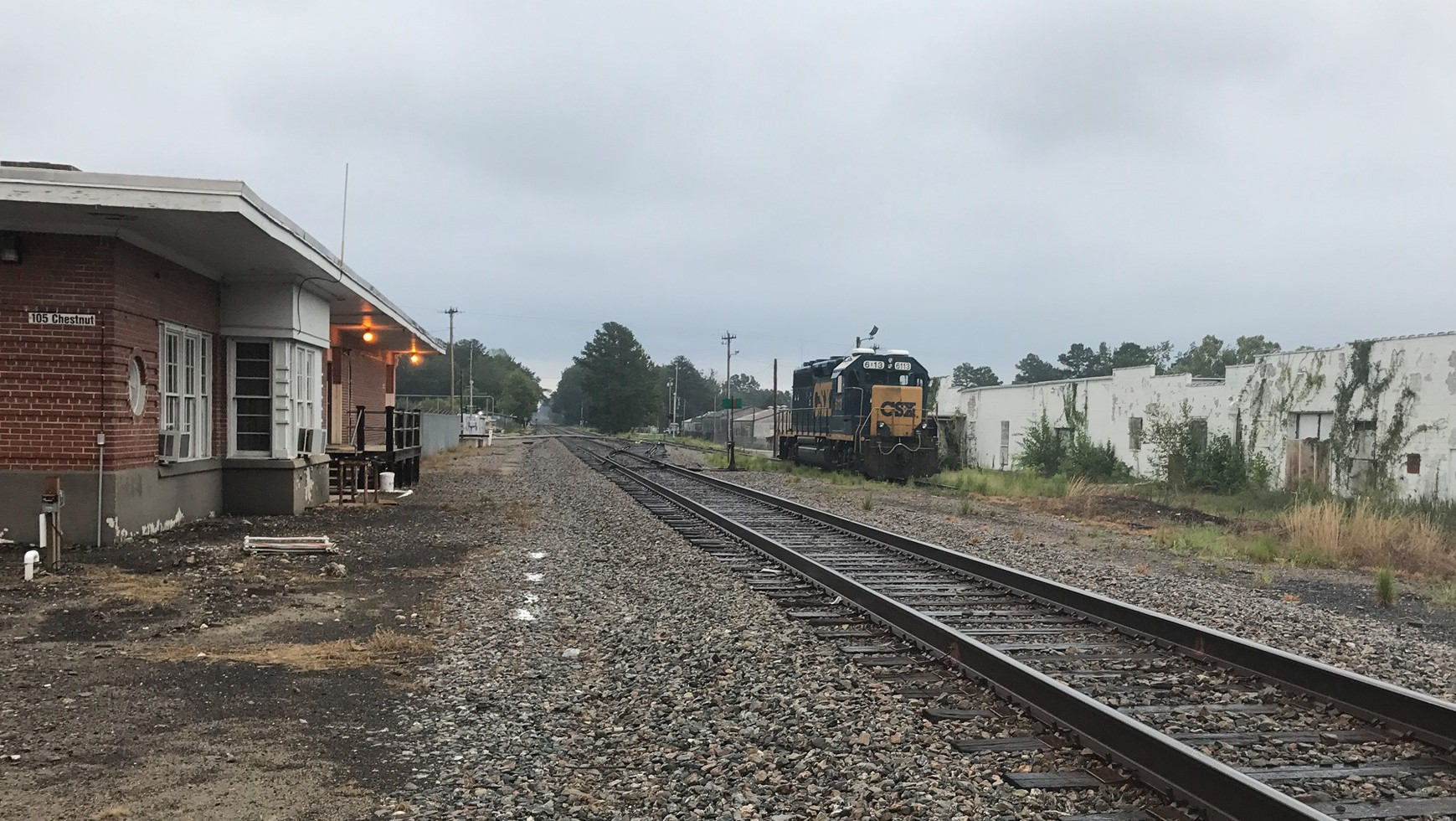
CSX locomotive on the Wilmington Subdivision in Lumberton, a remnant of the Carolina Central Railroad

Today, the former Carolina Central Railroad is still in service from Wilmington to Bostic and is still operated by CSX Transportation.

=== Wilmington Subdivision ===
The segment from Wilmington to East Junction in Hamlet is still operated as CSX's Wilmington Subdivision. It is now the only remaining rail line serving Wilmington, North Carolina since all former Atlantic Coast Line Railroad lines to Wilmington have since been severed.

=== East Junction to Monroe ===
The line from East Junction in Hamlet west to Pee Dee is now the east-west segment of CSX's Hamlet Terminal Subdivision. From Pee Dee west to Monroe is still known as the Monroe Subdivision, which now continues beyond Monroe down to Abbeville on the former Georgia, Carolina and Northern Railway.

=== Charlotte Subdivision ===
The line from Monroe though Charlotte to Bostic is now CSX's Charlotte Subdivision. The Charlotte Subdivision now terminates at CSX's Blue Ridge Subdivision (a former Clinchfield Railroad line) in Bostic. It connects to the Terrell Subdivision and the Charlotte Western Railroad in Mount Holly.

=== Terrell Subdivision ===
The line from Mount Holly, North Carolina to Terrell, North Carolina is called the Terrell Subdivision. The line runs for a total of 23.2 miles (37.3 km). At its southern end the line continues north from the Charlotte Subdivision and at its northern end the line comes to an end at Marshall Steam Station, owned by Duke Power.

=== West of Bostic ===
In the 1980s, CSX and Norfolk Southern Railway consolidated their parallel lines between Forest City and Rutherfordton. In the 1990, this remaining track and track from Forest City to Bostic was sold to the Thermal Belt Railway. Track from Forest City to Rutherfordton was abandoned in the early 2000s and is now part of the Thermal Belt Rail Trail. Track from Bostic to Forest City is still in place but has not been used since 2013.

== Historic stations ==
Wilmington to Rutherfordton
| Milepost | City/Location | Station | Connections and notes |
|---|---|---|---|
| SE 364.2 | Wilmington | Nutt Street Station | junction with Wilmington and Weldon Railroad (ACL) |
| SE 362.6 | Wilmington | Hilton Yard | |
| SE 360.3 | | Navassa | junction with Wilmington and Manchester Railroad (ACL) |
| SE 360.0 | | Navassa Yard | |
| SE 349.8 | | Northwest | |
| SE 347.0 | | Acme | |
| SE 338.8 | | East Arcadia | |
| SE 360.0 | | Council | |
| SE 327.1 | | Rosindale | |
| SE 318.9 | Clarkton | Clarkton | |
| SE 310.8 | Bladenboro | Bladenboro | |
| SE 301.9 | | Allenton | |
| SE 297.1 | Lumberton | Lumberton | junction with Carolina Northern Railroad |
| SE 291.3 | | Lowe | |
| SE 285.7 | Pembroke | Pembroke | junction with Atlantic Coast Line Railroad Main Line |
| SE 278.4 | | Alma | |
| SE 275.9 | Maxton | Maxton | junction with Cape Fear and Yadkin Valley Railway Bennettsville Branch (ACL) |
| SE 274.6 | | McNairs | |
| SE 269.1 | Laurinburg | Laurinburg | junction with Laurinburg and Southern Railroad |
| SE 263.6 | | Laurel Hill | |
| SE 260.8 | | Old Hundred | |
| SE 254.3 | Hamlet | East Junction | junction with Seaboard Air Line Railroad Andrews Subdivision |
| SE 253.4; SF 253.4 | Hamlet | Hamlet | junction with Seaboard Air Line Railroad Main Line |
| SF 253.8 | Hamlet | West Hamlet | |
| SF 259.3 | Rockingham | Rockingham | junction with Rockingham Railroad (ACL) |
| SF 266.7 | | Pee Dee | |
| SF 271.0 | | Gravelton | |
| SF 273.0 | Lilesville | Lilesville | |
| SF 278.1 | Wadesboro | Wadesboro | junction with: Cheraw and Salisbury Railroad (ACL); Winston-Salem Southbound Railway |
| SF 281.7 | | Russellville | |
| SF 285.2 | Polkton | Polkton | |
| SF 289.9 | Peachland | Peachland | |
| SF 295.8 | Marshville | Marshville | Siding: ~ 10,300 ft |
| SF 300.4 | Wingate | Wingate | |
| SF 306.2 | Monroe | Monroe | junction with Georgia, Carolina and Northern Railway (SAL) Yard: 0.9 mi |
| SF 313.3 | Indian Trail | Stouts | Siding: ~ 13,400 ft |
| SF 319.5 | Matthews | Matthews | |
| SF 326.2 | Charlotte | Rama | Siding: ~ 1,000 ft |
| SF 328.3 | Charlotte | East Charlotte Yard | |
| SF 330.2 | Charlotte | Charlotte | junction with: Raleigh, Charlotte and Southern Railway (NS); North Carolina Railroad (SOU) |
| SF 334.2 | Charlotte | Pinoca Yard | |
| SF 337.3 | Charlotte | Thrift | |
| SF 341.8 | Mount Holly | Mount Holly | junction with Piedmont and Northern Railway |
| SF 348.6 | Stanley | Stanley | |
| SF 355.8 | | Iron | |
| SF 362.3 | Lincolnton | Lincolnton | |
| SF 367.4 | | Crouse | |
| SF 372.4 | Cherryville | Cherryville | |
| SF 383.7 | Shelby | Shelby | |
| SF 391.8 | Lattimore | Lattimore | junction with Charleston, Cincinnati and Chicago Railroad (SOU) |
| SF 398.2 | Ellenboro | Ellenboro | junction with branch to Caroleen |
| SF 403.8 | Bostic | Bostic | junction with Carolina, Clinchfield and Ohio Railway |
| SF 405.5 | Bostic | CC&O Yard | |
| SF 407.4 | Forest City | Forest City | |
| SF 410.9 | Rutherfordton | Rutherfordton | junction with Charleston, Cincinnati and Chicago Railroad (SOU) |

Ellenboro to Caroleen
| Milepost | City/Location | Station | Connections and notes |
|---|---|---|---|
| SFA 398.2 | Ellenboro | Ellenboro | junction with Main line |
| SFA 402.7 | | Caroleen | |
| SFAB 403.4 | | Henrietta | |

== Works cited ==
- American Railroad Manual for the United States and the Dominion. United States: American Railroad Manual Company. 1874.
- Evans, William McKee (1995). Ballots and Fence Rails: Reconstruction on the Lower Cape Fear (reprint ed.). Athens: University of Georgia Press. ISBN 0-8203-1731-4.
- Interstate Commerce Commission (1932). Interstate Commerce Commission Reports: Decisions of the Interstate Commerce Commission of the United States: Valuation reports. United States: U.S. Government Printing Office.
- Prince, Richard E. (2000) [1966]. Seaboard Air Line Railway: Steam Boats, Locomotives, and History. Indiana University Press. ISBN 978-0-253-33695-8.
