= Wadesboro—Florence Line =

Atlantic Coast Line Railroad line in North Carolina and South Carolina

Overview
- Other name: Wadesboro Subdivision
- Status: Some segments are still operating
- Owner: Atlantic Coast Line Railroad (1902–1967); Seaboard Coast Line Railroad (1967–1986)
- Locale: South Carolina, North Carolina

Technical
- Track gauge: 1,435 mm (4 ft 8 1/2 in) standard gauge
- Electrification: No
- Signalling: None

The Atlantic Coast Line Railroad's Wadesboro—Florence Line (J Line) was one of the company's secondary main lines that ran from Florence, South Carolina north to Wadesboro, North Carolina. It was built in the late 1800s and large parts of it were built by the Atlantic Coast Line's predecessor companies. Parts of the line are still in service.

== Route description ==
The Wadesboro—Florence Line began at a junction with the Atlantic Coast Line Railroad's main line in Florence. From there it headed north and notably passed through Darlington, Society Hill, and Cheraw (where it crossed the main line of the Seaboard Air Line Railroad, the Atlantic Coast Line's primary competitor). From Cheraw, it continued north into North Carolina and terminated at Wadesboro.

The line's Hartsville Branch ran from the line at Floyd (just north of Darlington) west to Hartsville.

== History ==
The Wadesboro—Florence Line was built in segments by the Atlantic Coast Line Railroad's predecessors. From Florence to Cheraw, it was built by the Cheraw and Darlington Railroad in 1853. In 1868, the Cheraw and Salisbury Railroad was built from Cheraw north to Wadesboro.

The Hartsville Branch was built in 1884 by the Hartsville Railroad.

In 1892, the Cheraw and Darlington Railroad acquired the Cheraw and Salisbury Railroad and then acquired the Hartsville Railroad in 1895. The Cheraw and Darlington Railroad was then fully merged into the Atlantic Coast Line Railroad in 1898.

In 1910, the Wadesboro—Florence Line would also connect with the newly built Winston-Salem Southbound Railway in Wadesboro. The Winston-Salem Southbound Railway was jointly built by the Atlantic Coast Line and the Norfolk and Western Railway.

Passenger service operated on the Wadesboro—Florence Line until the 1940s. By 1949, one through freight train ran the line daily from Florence to Wadesboro and a separate local freight train ran six days a week. A local freight train also ran from Florence to Hartsville six days a week.

The Atlantic Coast Line became the Seaboard Coast Line Railroad (SCL) in 1967 after merging with their rival, the Seaboard Air Line Railroad (SAL). The line was designated as the Wadesboro Subdivision and the Hartsville Branch became the Floyd Subdivision. In an effort to further differentiate the lines, the company also added the letter A to the milepost prefix of former Atlantic Coast Line lines, making the line's prefix AJ. This was particularly important for this line considering the nearly parallel Hartsville Subdivision (a former Seaboard Air Line track) also had the prefix J (which became SJ post-merger).

In the mid-1970s, the Seaboard Coast Line abandoned the northern segment of the Wadesboro Subdivision from Wadesboro to Cheraw.

In 1980, the Seaboard Coast Line's parent company merged with the Chessie System, creating the CSX Corporation. The CSX Corporation initially operated the Chessie and Seaboard Systems separately until 1986, when they were merged into CSX Transportation. In the mid-1980s, the line was abandoned between Floyd and Society Hill, making two discontinuous segments.

== Current operations ==
The Wadesboro—Florence Line from Florence to Floyd, the Hartsville Branch, and former Seaboard Air Line trackage beyond Hartsville are still operated by the South Carolina Central Railroad. The South Carolina Central Railroad also operated the discontinuous segment from Society Hill to Cheraw, but that segment was abandoned in 2012.

== Historic stations ==
Wadesboro to Florence
State	Milepost	City/Location	Station	Connections and notes
NC	AJ 356.0	Wadesboro	Wadesboro	junction with: Seaboard Air Line Railroad Monroe Subdivision; Winston-Salem Southbound Railway
NC	AJ 346.1	Morven	Morven	
NC	AJ 342.7	McFarlan	McFarlan	
SC	AJ 337.3		Laney	
SC	AJ 334.8		Gretchen	
SC	AJ 331.4	Cheraw	Cheraw	junction with Seaboard Air Line Railroad Main Line
SC	AJ 326.3		Cash	
SC	AJ 319.8	Society Hill	Society Hill	
SC	AJ 310.4	Dovesville	Dovesville	
SC	AJ 308.1		Floyd	junction with Hartsville Branch
SC	AJ 302.2	Darlington	Darlington	junction with: Atlantic Coast Line Railroad Parkton—Sumter Line; Seaboard Air Line Railroad Hartsville Subdivision
SC	AJ 301.8		Nix	
SC	AJ 298.3		Palmetto	
SC	AJ 292.7	Florence	Florence	junction with: Atlantic Coast Line Railroad Main Line; Florence—Robbins Line

Hartsville Branch
Milepost	City/Location	Station	Connections and notes
AJA 308.1		Floyd	junction with Wadesboro—Florence Line
AJA 313.6		Auburn	
AJA 318.1	Hartsville	Hartsville	junction with Seaboard Air Line Railroad Hartsville Subdivision
