= Georgetown and North Carolina Narrow Gauge Railroad =

The Georgetown and North Carolina Narrow Gauge Railroad was a Southeastern railroad company chartered immediately after Reconstruction.

The Georgetown and North Carolina Narrow Gauge Railroad was chartered in 1878 by the South Carolina General Assembly.

The original intent was to build a line from Georgetown, South Carolina, through Georgetown, Williamsburg, Clarendon, Sumter and Kershaw counties, to the North Carolina border.

Its charter was amended in 1882 to strike "Narrow Gauge" from in its name, and the line was renamed the Georgetown and North Carolina Railroad.

In 1885, the S.C. General Assembly approved changing the name of the Georgetown and North Carolina to the Charleston, Cincinnati and Chicago Railroad Company.
