= Gumberry =

Gumberry may refer to:

- Gumberry, North Carolina in Northampton County, North Carolina
- Gumberry Swamp in Northampton County, North Carolina
- Cordia dichotoma
- Nyssa sylvatica (known as tupelo, sour gum, or black gum) and its fruit
- Gumberry and Jackson Railroad in North Carolina that was acquired by the Northampton & Hertford Railroad in 1894, which was acquired by Carolina & Northeastern Railway
