= ABPR =

ABPR may refer to:

- Animal By-Products Regulations
- Aberdeen and Briar Patch Railway
- American Book Publishing Record
