= Hartsville Railroad =

The Hartsville Railroad was a railroad that served eastern South Carolina in the late 19th century.

The Hartsville Railroad Company was chartered by the South Carolina General Assembly in 1884, with the goal of constructing a line starting from Hartsville, South Carolina.

The line was completed in 1889 and was acquired by the Cheraw and Darlington Railroad in 1895. The Cheraw and Darlington was acquired by the Atlantic Coast Line Railroad in 1898. The line became the Atlantic Coast Line's Hartsville Branch.
