= Winston-Salem Southbound Railway Freight Warehouse and Office =

Historic building in North Carolina, US

- U.S. National Register of Historic Places
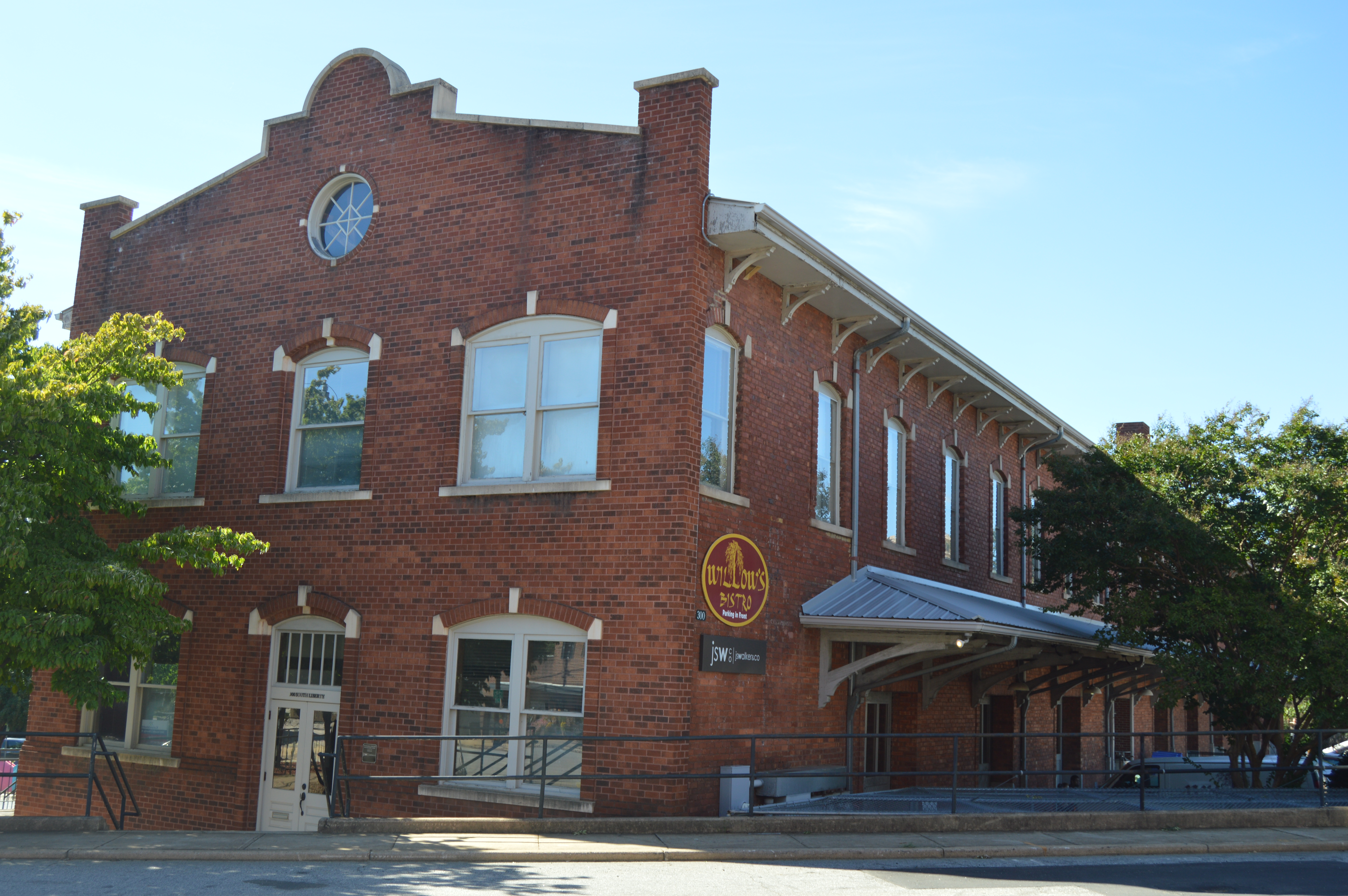
- Northern side and front

- Location within North Carolina Location within the United States
- Location: 300 S. Liberty St., Winston-Salem, North Carolina
- Coordinates: 36°5′30″N 80°14′40″W
- Area: 0.7 acres (0.28 ha)
- Built: 1913
- Built by: Rhodes & Underwood
- Architect: Leither, Joseph F.
- Architectural style: Italianate
- NRHP reference No.: 91001747
- Added to NRHP: November 29, 1991

Winston-Salem Southbound Railway Freight Warehouse and Office is a historic railway freight warehouse and office building located at Winston-Salem, Forsyth County, North Carolina. It was built in 1913, and is a two-story, brick railroad building with a shallow gable roof and Italianate-style design elements. It measures 40 feet by 224 feet. The building served until 1985 as headquarters for the Winston-Salem Southbound Railway. In 1990, the building was sympathetically renovated for office use.

It was listed on the National Register of Historic Places in 1991.
