= Palmetto Railway =

Railroad in North Carolina and South Carolina

The Palmetto Railway was a Southeastern railroad that served South Carolina and North Carolina in the late 19th century.

The Palmetto Railway was a successor to the Palmetto Railroad which had been chartered by the general assemblies of South Carolina and North Carolina in the 1880s.

In 1895, the Palmetto Railroad was reorganized due to financial difficulties and renamed the Palmetto Railway.

The line stretched from Hamlet, North Carolina, to Cheraw, South Carolina, where it connected with the Cheraw and Darlington Railroad.

In 1900, the Palmetto Railway become part of Seaboard Air Line Railway.

October 13, 2013 South Carolina Public Railways (SCPR) announced Friday its name change to Palmetto Railways, in a move designed to streamline operations and better reflect the state-owned agency's expanding economic development mission.
