= South Carolina and Georgia Extension Railroad =

The South Carolina and Georgia Extension Railroad of South Carolina was a railroad that operated in the late 19th century.

The line was created in 1898 when organizers purchased the failed Ohio River and Charleston Railway, a successor of the Charleston, Cincinnati and Chicago Railroad.

In February 1899, the South Carolina and Georgia Extension Railroad Company of South Carolina was consolidated with the South Carolina and Georgia Extension Railroad Company of North Carolina, to form the South Carolina and Georgia Extension Railroad Company.

In 1902, the South Carolina and Georgia Extension Railroad became part of the Southern Railway – Carolina Division.
