= Terrell Subdivision =

Railway line in North Carolina

The Terrell Subdivision is a railroad line owned by CSX Transportation in the U.S. state of North Carolina. The line runs from Mount Holly, North Carolina, to Terrell, North Carolina, for a total of 23.2 miles (37.3 km). At its southern end the line continues north from the Charlotte Subdivision and at its northern end the line comes to an end at Marshall Steam Station, owned by Duke Power.

== See also ==
- List of CSX Transportation lines
