= Georgia Air Line Railroad =

The Georgia Air Line Railroad was chartered as a railroad company designed to serve the Southeastern United States, beginning in the mid-19th century.

The Georgia Air Line was chartered in 1856, with the goal of laying a line between Atlanta, Georgia, and the South Carolina Upstate Region. This did not happen as the Georgia Air Line Railroad never laid any track.

In June 1870, the Georgia Air Line Railroad and the Air Line Railroad in South Carolina were joined together by the Richmond and Danville Railroad to form the Atlanta and Richmond Air Line Railway.
