= East Carolina Land and Railway Company =

Chartered by Craven County, North Carolina, and the city of New Bern in 1887

The East Carolina Land and Railway Company was chartered by Craven County, North Carolina, and the city of New Bern in 1887 to construct a 37-mile (60 km) rail line connecting New Bern with Jacksonville, North Carolina. $60,000 was asked for the rail line from the county, plus an additional $40,000 to extend the rail line to either Washington, Greenville, or Pantego. The county commissioners agreed to underwrite $50,000 worth of bonds, provided the East Carolina Land and Railway Company's plans were approved of by Craven County voters in a special referendum. In January 1888, however, the railroad company withdrew its proposal and interest in the project waned.

In 1889, interest in the East Carolina Land and Railway Company was renewed, when citizens of New Bern petitioned the county commissioners to call a special referendum to allow the city of New Bern to vote on a proposition to provide $50,000 to the railroad company, provided that the railroad company connected New Bern with Jacksonville. The referendum was approved by the voters, and by 1893 the line was completed. The same year, the county commissioners officially approved New Bern’s purchase of East Carolina Land and Railway Company stock. However, the promise of lowered local taxes, owing to the proposed revenues that were to be generated by the railroad’s operation, never occurred, and in fact, taxes were raised to pay for the city’s stock purchase. Also at this time, the East Carolina Land and Railway Company was merged with the Wilmington, Onslow and East Carolina Railroad to form the Wilmington, Newbern and Norfolk Railway Company.
