= Georgetown and North Carolina Railroad =

The Georgetown and North Carolina Railroad was a Southeastern railroad company that operated after Reconstruction.

The company was originally chartered as the Georgetown and North Carolina Narrow Gauge Railroad by the South Carolina General Assembly in 1878.

The charter was amended in 1882 to strike "Narrow Gauge" from its name, and the line was renamed the Georgetown and North Carolina Railroad.

The original intent was to build a line from Georgetown, South Carolina, through Georgetown, Williamsburg, Clarendon, Sumter and Kershaw counties, to the North Carolina border.

Its In 1883, the line was to be rerouted so that it would be able to access Charleston Harbor.

In 1885, the S.C. General Assembly approved changing the name of the Georgetown and North Carolina to the Charleston, Cincinnati and Chicago Railroad Company.
