= Raleigh and Charleston Railroad =

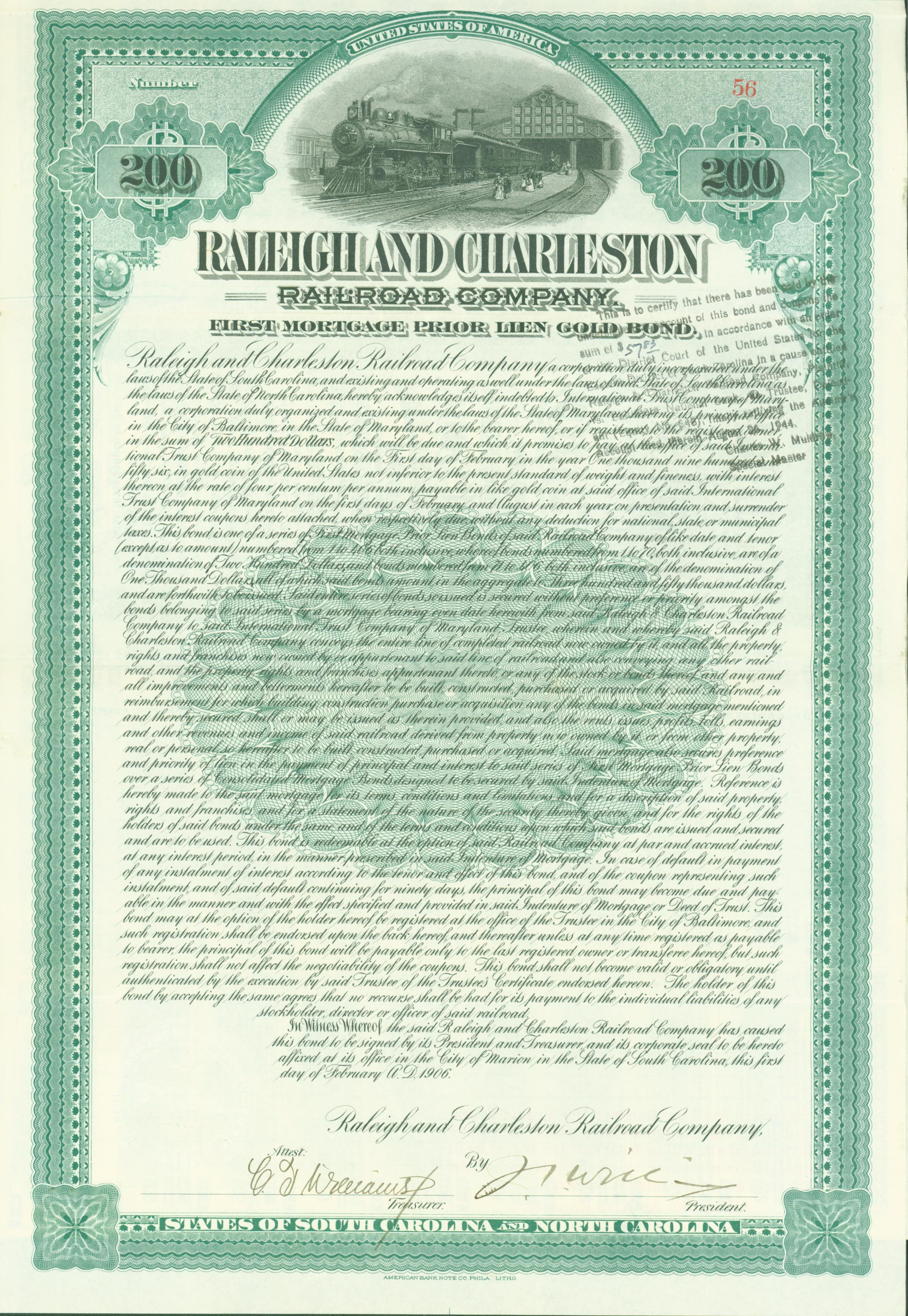
Gold Bond of the Raleigh and Charleston Railroad Company, issued 1 February 1906

The Raleigh and Charleston Railroad was a Southeastern railroad that served eastern South Carolina and eastern North Carolina in the early 20th century.

The Raleigh and Charleston was formed as a reorganization of the Carolina Northern Railroad in 1905 after the latter went into receivership in 1902. The line ran from Lumberton, North Carolina, to South Marion, South Carolina.

The Raleigh and Charleston Railroad Company was incorporated in 1905. In December 1911, the Seaboard Air Line acquired the company.

The Raleigh and Charleston was listed as an "abandoned" line when Seaboard underwent a reorganization in the early 1940s.
