= High Point, Thomasville and Denton Railroad =

Overview
- Reporting mark: HPTD
- Locale: North Carolina
- Dates of operation: 1923–

Technical
- Track gauge: 4 ft 8 1/2 in (1,435 mm) standard gauge

The High Point, Thomasville, and Denton Railroad (Reporting mark HPTD) was a 20-mile short-line railroad owned by the jointly CSX Transportation and Norfolk Southern Railway owned Winston-Salem Southbound Railway (WSS). The Winston-Salem Southbound Railway, filed a request April 13, 2010, to merge the High Point, Thomasville, and Denton Railroad into the Winston-Salem Southbound Railway. The Surface Transportation Board published notice of this transaction April 16, 2010 to be effective May 1.

Norfolk Southern has a small yard in High Point at the beginning of the line.

== Traffic ==
Commodities carried by the line are grain, sand, gravel, stone, forest products, paper products, coal, coke, cement, clay, fertilizer, aluminum, chemicals, iron, and steel.

== Motive power ==
At the present time, locomotives are provided by CSX or Norfolk Southern.

== See also ==
- CSX Transportation
- Norfolk Southern Railway
- Winston-Salem Southbound Railway
