= Atlanta and Richmond Air-Line Railway =

Railway line in the United States

Atlanta and Richmond Air–Line Railway
Overview
- Locale: Georgia
- Dates of operation: 1870–1876
- Successor: Southern Railway

Technical
- Track gauge: 4 ft 8 1/2 in (1,435 mm) standard gauge

Organized in 1870, the Atlanta and Richmond Air–Line Railway combined the Georgia Air Line Railroad and the Air Line Railroad in South Carolina under president Algernon S. Buford. The line was complete by 1873 but went broke the next year when it was re-organized into the Atlanta and Charlotte Air Line Railway.

It later became part of the Southern Railway.
