= Wilmington, New Bern and Norfolk Railroad =

Historic railroad in North Carolina

Overview
- Dates of operation: 1891–1897
- Successor: Atlantic Coast Line Railroad

Technical
- Track gauge: 4 ft 8 1/2 in (1,435 mm) standard gauge
- Length: 86 miles (138 km)

The Wilmington, New Bern and Norfolk Railroad was a railroad built in the late 1800s running from New Bern Junction in Wilmington, North Carolina northeast to New Bern, North Carolina. The line was part of the Wilmington and Weldon Railroad network and later became part of the Atlantic Coast Line Railroad network.

== History ==
The Wilmington, New Bern and Norfolk Railroad was first chartered in 1885 as the Wilmington, Onslow and East Carolina Railroad by the North Carolina General Assembly. It was owned by the Wilmington and Weldon Railroad, who operated a large network in North Carolina. The line began service in 1891.

In 1894, the Wilmington, Onslow and East Carolina Railroad was reorganized as the Wilmington, New Bern and Norfolk Railroad. Later that same year, it was renamed the Wilmington and New Bern Railroad, though some official records indicate this name was never used and still referred to the line as the Wilmington, New Bern and Norfolk Railroad.

In 1897, the company went into foreclosure and was again reorganized. During this reorganization, it was fully merged into the Wilmington and Weldon Railroad network. By 1900, the Wilmington and Weldon Railroad was fully incorporated into the Atlantic Coast Line Railroad.

The Atlantic Coast Line Railroad operated the line as their New Bern Branch and Wilmington would also be the headquarters of the Atlantic Coast Line Railroad system. The Atlantic Coast Line Railroad continued to operate passenger service on the New Bern Branch in its early years but it later became freight only.

In 1941, the Atlantic Coast Line built a branch on the line from Jacksonville south to the site of Marine Corps Base Camp Lejeune. The branch would first be used to transport materials needed to construct Camp Lejeune and it was later used to support operation of the base.

By 1949, the Atlantic Coast Line was running one local freight train six days a week.

In 1967, the Atlantic Coast Line merged with its rival, the Seaboard Air Line Railroad (SAL). The merged company was named the Seaboard Coast Line Railroad (SCL) and the line was then known as the New Bern Subdivision.

The Seaboard Coast Line abandoned the New Bern Subdivision in 1985. Some of the Camp Lejeune Subdivision near the base was incorporated into the Camp Lejeune Railroad, which is still in place.

== Historic stations ==
Milepost	City/Location	Station	Connections and notes
ACB 243.1	Wilmington	New Bern Junction	junction with Wilmington and Weldon Railroad (ACL)
ACB 245.9		Fernside	
ACB 255.3		Scotts Hill	
ACB 259.7		Hampstead	
ACB 264.7		Woodside	
ACB 272.5	Holly Ridge	Holly Ridge	
ACB 277.1		Folkstone	
ACB 280.7		Dixon	
ACB 286.2		Verona	
ACB 292.1	Jacksonville	Jacksonville	
ACB 294.1	Jacksonville	Marine Junction	junction with Camp Lejeune Branch
ACD 302.4	Jacksonville	Camp Lejeune	built 1941 located on Camp Lejeune Branch
ACB 297.9		Kellum	
ACB 306.6		Belgrade	
ACB 308.3	Maysville	Maysville	
ACB 315.6	Pollocksville	Pollocksville	
ACB 327.9	New Bern	New Bern Yard	
ACB 329.1	New Bern	New Bern	junction with: Atlantic and North Carolina Railroad (NS); Pamlico, Oriental and Western Railway (NS)
