= Ohio River and Charleston Railway =

Former American railway company

Overview
- Status: Consolidated
- Owner: North Carolina portion: Ohio River and Charleston Railway Company (of North Carolina) (?-November 1894), Ohio River and Charleston Railway Company (November 1894- June 1898); South Carolina portion: Ohio River and Charleston Railway Company (of South Carolina) (May 1894-November 1894), Ohio River and Charleston Railway Company (November 1894-August 1, 1898), South Carolina and Georgia Extension Company (of South Carolina) (August 1, 1898-February 1899), South Carolina and Georgia Extension Railroad Company (February 1899-May 1902), Southern Railway (wholly owned subsidiary) (May 1902-December 1990), Norfolk Southern Railway (December 1990 – 2813 (911-year lease)); Virginia portion: Ohio River and Charleston Railway Company (of Virginia) (?-November 1894), Ohio River and Charleston Railway Company (November 1894-June 1898); Tennessee portion: Ohio River and Charleston Railway Company (of Tennessee) (?-November 1894), Ohio River and Charleston Railway Company (November 1894-June 1898)
- Locale: Eastern United States
- Termini: Edgefield, South Carolina & Shelby, North Carolina; Aiken & Camden, South Carolina
- Stations: 29 (1894; South Carolina), 30 (1895–1898; South Carolina)

Service
- Type: Railway
- Operator(s): Same as Owner, see above.

Technical
- Track gauge: 4 ft 8 1/2 in (1,435 mm)

The Ohio River and Charleston Railway was a Southeastern railroad that operated in the late 19th century.

== Creation ==
=== Tennessee ===
On July 17, 1893, Charles E. Hellier bought a section of railroad known as the "Clinchfield route" from Baring Brothers, an English banking company that had recently gone bankrupt due to the Panic of 1893, for $550,000. He then organized the Ohio River and Charleston Railway Company (of Tennessee). Two months later, in September 1893, he extended the railroad to go from Chestoa, Tennessee, to a station five miles south of Huntdale, North Carolina.

=== South Carolina ===
The Ohio River and Charleston Railway Company (of South Carolina) was organized in 1894 to take over the Charleston, Cincinnati and Chicago Railroad.

== Consolidation of the Four Companies ==
In November 1894, the Ohio River and Charleston Railway Company (of North Carolina), the Ohio River and Charleston Railway Company (of Virginia), and the Ohio River and Charleston Railway Company (of Tennessee) were consolidated to form the Ohio River and Charleston Railway Company.

== Fate ==
The line went into foreclosure in June 1898, with South Carolina property being sold under foreclosure on August 1, 1898, to organizers of the South Carolina and Georgia Extension Railroad Company (of South Carolina).

In February 1899, the South Carolina and Georgia Extension Railroad Company of South Carolina was consolidated with the South Carolina and Georgia Extension Railroad Company of North Carolina, to form the South Carolina and Georgia Extension Railroad Company.

In 1902, the South Carolina and Georgia Extension Railroad became part of the Southern Railway – Carolina Division. Meanwhile, that same year, The Tennessee portion became part of the South and Western Railway.

== See also ==
- Charleston, Cincinnati and Chicago Railroad
