= Air Line Railroad in South Carolina =

The Air Line Railroad Company of South Carolina was chartered as a South Carolina railroad that was to have served the Southeastern United States, beginning in the mid-19th century.

The Air Line was created by an act of the South Carolina General Assembly in 1856, with the goal of laying a line toward Georgia to the west and "some point of connection with the Charlotte and South Carolina Railroad, in the direction of Charlotte, North Carolina," in the east. This did not happen as the Air Line Railroad never laid any track.

In June 1870, the Air Line Railroad Company of South Carolina and the Georgia Air Line Railroad were joined by the Richmond and Danville Railroad to form the Atlanta and Richmond Air Line Railway.
