= Florence and Fayetteville Railroad =

Former railroad in the Southeastern region of the United States

The Florence and Fayetteville Railroad was a Southeastern railroad that operated during and after the American Civil War.

The Florence and Fayetteville was chartered by both South Carolina and North Carolina in 1861.

It's not clear if the line was completed while under the Florence and Fayetteville name, but it appears 47 miles of right of way were graded, from Fayetteville, North Carolina, to the South Carolina state line. The work appears to have been completed by the Western Railroad, which later changed its name in 1879 to the Cape Fear and Yadkin Valley Railway.
