= Kings Mountain Railroad =

Former railroad in South Carolina, USA

The Kings Mountain Railroad was a 5 ft (1,524 mm) gauge shortline railroad that served South Carolina before, during and after the American Civil War.

The Kings Mountain Railroad Company was chartered in 1848 and the line was completed in 1852. It ran 22 miles (35 km) from Yorkville to Chester Court House and cost 000, most of which was privately financed.

The line connected Yorkville with a main railroad line running from Charlotte, North Carolina, to Gastonia, North Carolina, and then to Atlanta, Georgia. The local line was eventually extended to Chester and made connection there with the Charlotte-to-Columbia, South Carolina, main line.

The railroad was destroyed by the Union Army during the Civil War and was not rebuilt afterward. It lay abandoned for several years, until its line was acquired by the Chester and Lenoir Narrow Gauge Railroad in 1873.

The Chester and Lenoir eventually operated under the umbrella of the Richmond and Danville Railroad, and later became part of the Southern Railway.
