= Chester and Lenoir Narrow Gauge Railroad =

Railroad in South Carolina, US

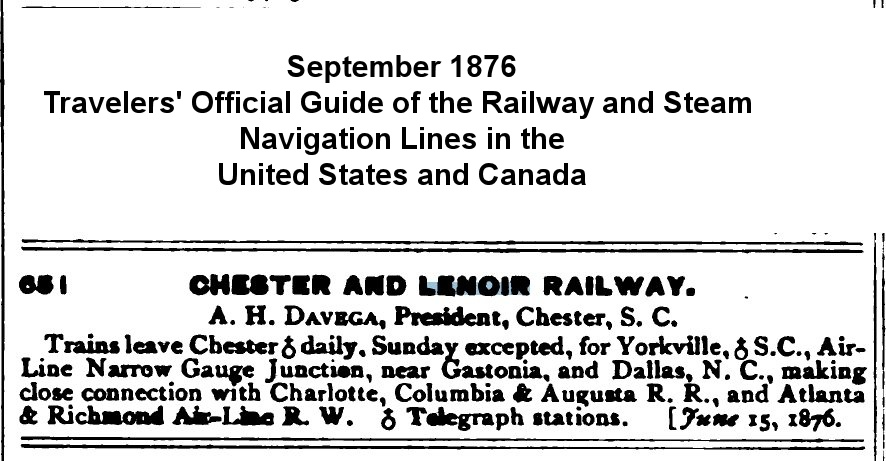
A schedule for the Chester and Lenoir Railway from 1876. Via Google Books.

The Chester and Lenoir Narrow Gauge Railroad was a 3 ft (914 mm) narrow-gauge railroad that served South Carolina following the Civil War.

In 1873, the Chester and Lenoir was chartered through the consolidation of the Kings Mountain Railroad and the Carolina narrow gauge railroad company. The previous line had lay abandoned for several years until it was acquired by the Chester and Lenoir.

Within a decade the Chester and Lenoir had extended the line to Lenoir, North Carolina. At over 120 miles (190 km), the Chester and Lenoir was the largest narrow-gauge railroad in the Carolinas.

Over the next decade, the railroad operated under the umbrella of the Richmond and Danville Railroad.

When the Richmond and Danville were re-organized as the Southern Railway In 1894, the Chester and Lenoir operated on its own for a short while. By 1896, it went into receivership, and the following year was re-organized as the Carolina & North-Western Railway.

The Carolina & North-Western was absorbed into the Southern Railway around 1940.
