= Caroleen, North Carolina =

- Unincorporated community
- Location within North Carolina Location within the United States
- Coordinates: 35°16′52″N 81°47′29″W
- Country: United States
- State: North Carolina
- County: Rutherford

Area
  - Total: 1.11 sq mi (2.87 km^{2})
  - Land: 1.11 sq mi (2.87 km^{2})
  - Water: 0 sq mi (0.00 km^{2})
- Elevation: 860 ft (260 m)

Population (2020)
  - Total: 560
  - Density: 505.8/sq mi (195.28/km^{2})
- Time zone: UTC-5 (Eastern (EST))
  - Summer (DST): UTC-4 (EDT)
- ZIP code: 28019
- Area code: 828
- GNIS feature ID: 2628617

Caroleen is an unincorporated community and census-designated place (CDP) in southeastern Rutherford County, North Carolina, United States. Its population was 560 as of the 2020 census. Caroleen has a post office with ZIP code 28019. U.S. Route 221 Alternate passes through the community.

== History ==
Caroleen is located on the Second Broad River. It was named in honor of Caroline, wife of industrialist Simpson B. Tanner Sr.

The Post Office Department ruled that Caroline was too similar to Carolina to be acceptable, so the name Caroleen was selected instead.

The communities of Avondale and Henrietta, founded in 1887 and named for Tanner's mother-in-law Henrietta McRae Spencer, lie directly south.

== Demographics ==
Historical population
Census	Pop.	Note	%±
2020	560		—
U.S. Decennial Census

== Notable person ==
Smoky Burgess – Major League Baseball player, nine-time All-Star and 1960 World Series champion
