= Aberdeen and Briar Patch Railway =

Overview
- Reporting mark: ABPR
- Dates of operation: 1984–1987
- Predecessor: Carolina and Northwestern Railway
- Successor: Aberdeen, Carolina and Western Railway

Technical
- Track gauge: 4 ft 8 1/2 in (1,435 mm)

The Aberdeen and Briar Patch Railway (reporting mark ABPR) was a short-line railroad which operated in North Carolina. The company operated a former Norfolk Southern line between Star and Aberdeen, North Carolina. The company was founded in 1983, began operating in 1984, and was sold in 1987.

== History ==
The Aberdeen and Briar Patch owned a 34.46-mile (55.46 km) line between Star and Aberdeen in North Carolina. This line began as a logging railroad in the 1880s, eventually passing to the Norfolk Southern in 1916. In 1983 the Norfolk Southern, then doing business as the Carolina and Northwestern Railway, decided to abandon the line. The Aberdeen and Briar Patch was incorporated on August 1, 1983, and acquired the line. It began operating in 1984. The Aberdeen, Carolina and Western Railway acquired the assets of the company on June 19, 1987.

== Notes ==
=== References ===
- Lewis, Edward A. (1986). American Shortline Railway Guide (3rd ed.). Milwaukee, WI: Kalmbach Publishing. ISBN 0-89024-073-6. OCLC 14819199. OL 617324M.
- Lewis, Edward A. (1991). American Shortline Railway Guide (4th ed.). Waukesha, WI: Kalmbach Publishing. ISBN 0-89024-109-0. OCLC 25150373.
