= Experimental Railroad =

The Experimental Railroad was a horse-driven railroad in Raleigh, North Carolina built in 1833 to transport granite for the North Carolina State Capitol from a quarry one mile away in southeast Raleigh. It is considered North Carolina's first railroad.

North Carolina's first self-powered railroad was the Wilmington and Weldon Railroad, built in 1840.
