= Asheville and Spartanburg Railroad =

Carolinas railway, est. 1879

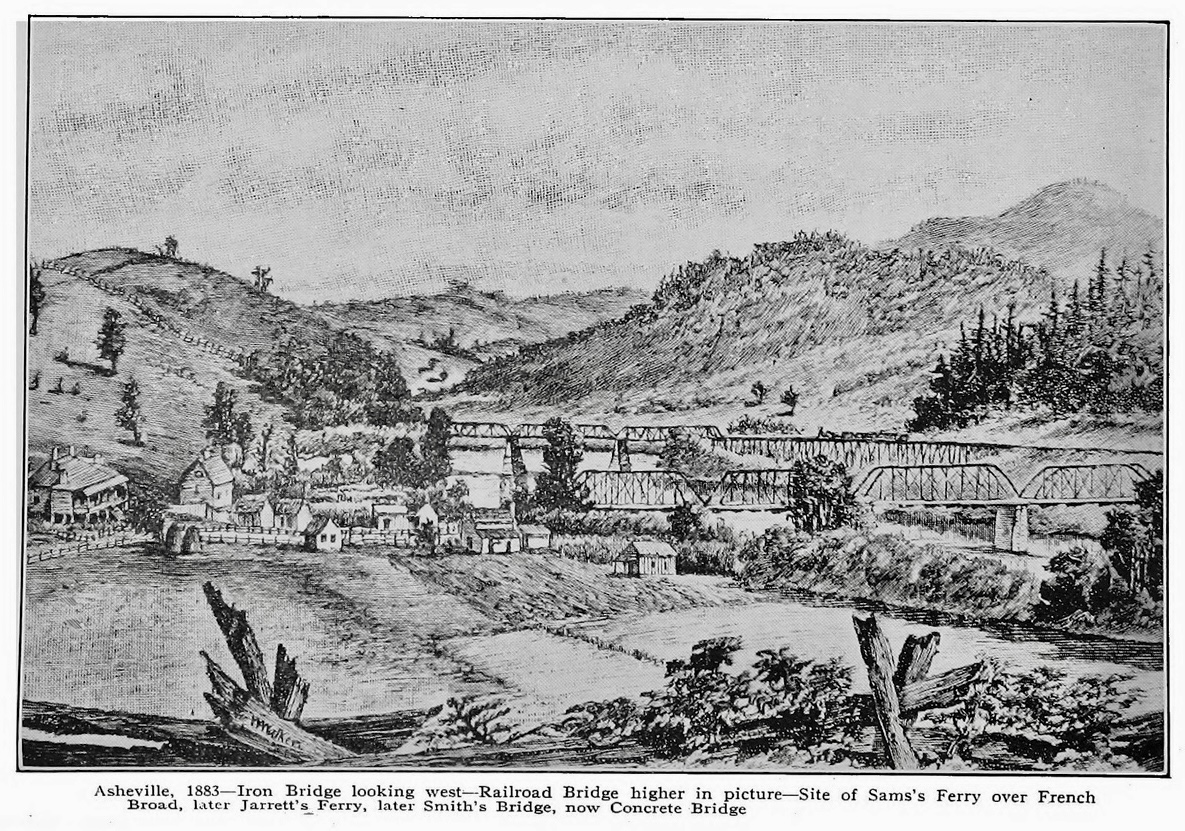
Asheville, 1883—Iron Bridge looking west—Railroad Bridge higher in picture—Site of Sams's Ferry over French Broad, later Jarrett's Ferry, later Smith's Bridge, now Concrete Bridge (1922)

The Asheville and Spartanburg Railroad was a Southern United States railroad that served South Carolina and North Carolina in the late 19th century and early 20th century.

The line was chartered as the Spartanburg and Asheville Railroad in 1873 and the following year it was consolidated with the Greeneville and French Broad Railroad, a North Carolina line. The Greeneville and French Broad was chartered in 1854 to connect Greeneville, Tennessee (near the French Broad River) with destinations in North Carolina, but "anticipated costs and the U.S. Civil War caused this line to be aborted before construction ever started."

The line between Spartanburg, South Carolina, and Hendersonville, North Carolina, opened in 1879. It was sold under foreclosure in 1881 and reorganized under the Asheville and Spartanburg Railroad that same year.

The 21 mi (34 km) distance between Hendersonville and Asheville, North Carolina, was completed in 1886. By that point, the line was operated as part of the Richmond and Danville Railroad until 1894 and controlled by the Southern Railway afterward.

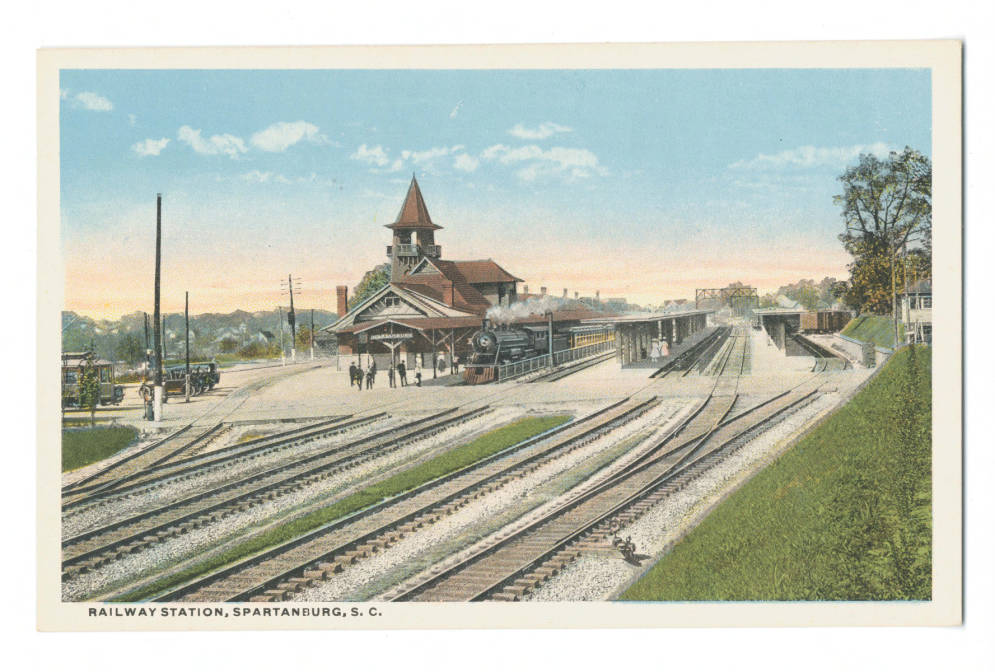
Spartanburg Union Station around 1910-1919; showing the main station, five tracks with three platforms along them and a separate track going to other side of station.
