= State University Railroad =

Railway sector

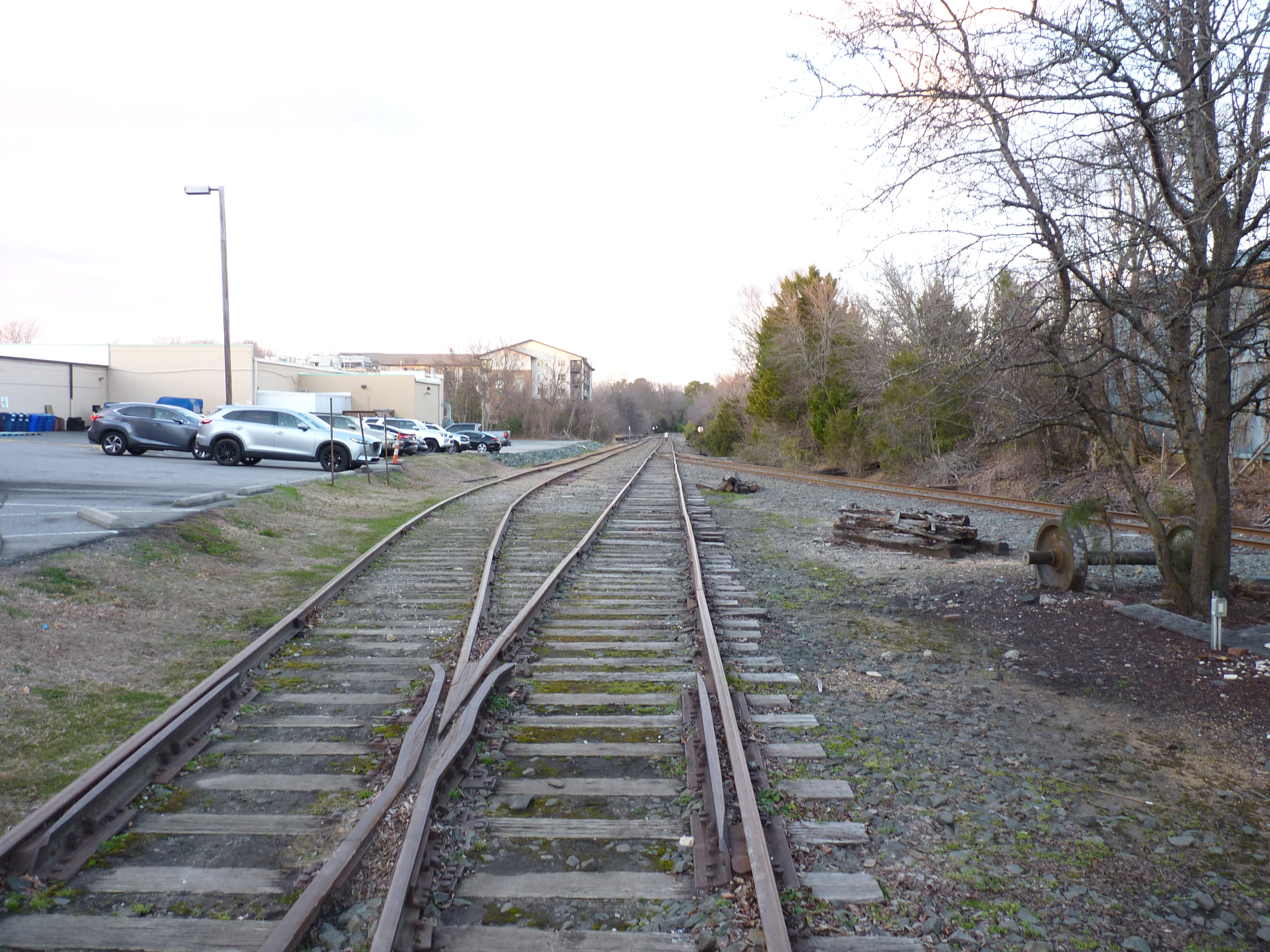
- Carrboro Yard

Overview
- Reporting mark: SUR
- Locale: North Carolina
- Dates of operation: 1873–Present

Technical
- Track gauge: 4 ft 8 1/2 in (1,435 mm) standard gauge
- Length: 10.2 miles (16.4 kilometres)

Other
- Website: www.nscorp.com

The State University Railroad is a 10.2 mile railroad spur of the North Carolina Railroad that began offering service from Glenn, North Carolina, near Hillsborough to a point west of Chapel Hill, North Carolina on January 1, 1882.

== History ==
As railroads developed in North Carolina during the nineteenth century, the University of North Carolina at Chapel Hill's relatively isolated location meant that it did not lie along any rail lines initially. A major east-west rail corridor between Greensboro in the west and Goldsboro in the east passed eight miles to the north.

Robert F. Hoke, a former Confederate general and the owner of an iron mine just north of Chapel Hill, obtained a charter in February 1873 for the Chapel Hill Iron Mountain Railroad Company, but the railroad was not organized until after the name was changed to the State University Railroad in March 1879, with the support of UNC president Kemp Battle. In order that the students at the University of North Carolina not be tempted from their studies, a state statute decreed that the end of the spur be located at least a mile from the school's campus.

The rail line began service in 1881, and the first train, known as "The Whooper," was a locomotive and two passenger cars that made the run from University Station to Chapel Hill Station twice daily. The trip from university station to Chapel Hill Station took an hour traveling southbound and seventy minutes northbound. The current town of Carrboro, then known as West End, started to grow as a result of the railroad. Elizabeth 'Libba' Cotten wrote the famous song "Freight Train" as a young teenager, inspired mainly by the train that for years passed behind her house on Lloyd Street in Carrboro. In the 1920s, the line was extended into the UNC campus for a time, where it was used to transport construction materials for campus buildings, including Wilson Library.

The company still exists as a subsidiary of the Norfolk Southern Railway. As passenger service ended by 1940, UNC's new power plant was built to take advantage of the rail line. The primary traffic on the rail line currently comes from freight deliveries of coal to this power plant.

== See also ==
- Norfolk Southern Railway
