= Thermal Belt Railway =

Overview
- Headquarters: Morganton, North Carolina
- Reporting mark: TBRY
- Locale: Rutherford County, North Carolina
- Dates of operation: 1990–
- Predecessor: Norfolk Southern, CSX Transportation

Technical
- Track gauge: 4 ft 8 1/2 in (1,435 mm) standard gauge
- Length: 8.5 miles (13.7 km)

The Thermal Belt Railway (reporting marks TBRY) is a Class III shortline railroad that operates for freight service on an irregular schedule on a former CSX line from Bostic to Forest City and on a former Norfolk Southern line from Forest City to Alexander Mills, North Carolina. Total mileage is 8.5 miles (13.7 km). Connections are made with CSX at Bostic. Rail is 85 pounds.

== History ==
The former CSXT Bostic-Forest City line was originally built by the Central Carolina Railroad in 1886 as part of a route from Rutherfordton to Charlotte, North Carolina. The Central Carolina was later acquired by Seaboard Air Line. Through mergers, it later became part of CSX. The former Norfolk Southern Forest City-Alexander Mills line was built in 1887 by the Charleston, Cincinnati, and Chicago Railroad as part of a line from Marion, North Carolina to Kingville in South Carolina. The line was soon acquired by the Southern Railway, which merged into Norfolk Southern in 1982.

By the early 1980s, both CSX and Norfolk Southern reached an agreement to allow the consolidation of trackage in both Rutherford and Cleveland counties. This would allow both companies to abandon duplicate lines, while granting trackage rights on former competitor routes. While this move helped with operating costs, traffic declined to the point that by late 1989, Norfolk Southern had pulled out of operating its remaining segment from Gilkey, through Forest City, to Alexander Mills. The Gilkey-Ruth segment of this line had already been embargoed due to lack of traffic as well as downed trees caused by Hurricane Hugo. At about this time, CSX was considering abandonment of its Bostic-Forest City line as well.

A group of the railroad's online shippers formed the Rutherford Railroad Development Corporation, which acquired both the former CSX Bostic-Forest City line and Norfolk Southern's Gilkey-Alexander Mills line in early 1990 in order to preserve rail service. Total rail mileage acquired was 16 miles. The line was leased to Southeast Shortlines, Inc, which renamed the line the Thermal Belt Railway after the area's isothermal effect which, on certain cool nights, allowed the area mountains to be warmer in temperature on the slope than on the base. The line started operations on April 2, 1990. Traffic in its first few years consisted of inbound plastic pellets, grain and lumber and outbound pulpwood on the remaining open sections of track, while work started on clearing the downed trees on the embargoed section. However traffic on that segment never materialized, and after about 10 years of dormancy, the Gilkey-Spindale section was converted into a rail-trail with the provision that it could be reactivated if needed. The remaining trackage has seen a steady decline of traffic to the point that by late 2010, parts of the line was used for rail car storage.

As of 2014 the only customer remaining on the line is a small transload operation near the CSX interchange. Included in the May 2014 North Carolina Freight Rail & Rail Crossing Safety Improvement Fund Projects budget is a $58,688 grant to construct more transloading tracks and expand this operation.

== Motive power ==
The Thermal Belt operates with two locomotives. Number 1 is an Electro-Motive Corporation SW model switcher repowered with a Cummins 600 horsepower engine block. The unit was originally built in July, 1938 for Missouri Pacific's subsidiary, Union Terminal Railway of St. Joseph, Missouri. It was then transferred to another Missouri Pacific subsidiary, St. Joseph Belt Railway, which served as their #5. When the St Joseph Belt was merged into the Missouri Pacific, the SW became their #6005.

The locomotive was sold in the mid-1960s to Precision Engineering, which remanufactured (but not repowered) the SW. The unit was sold to the Pickens Railroad as their #3. Pickens kept the unit until the mid-1970s when it was sold to Birmingham Rail and Locomotive near Birmingham, Alabama. It was then acquired by Duke Power and sent to Chattahoochee Locomotive, near Cornelia, Georgia to be repowered with a Cummins engine block. It was assigned to construction duty at Duke's Cherokee Nuclear Power Plant. An economic downturn as well as new nuclear power regulations in the 1980s sidelined the plant, parking the SW locomotive for several years.

The unit was sold in 1989 to Don McGrady, which formed Southeastern Shortlines Inc as an operator for the Thermal Belt Railway and, later on, the Caldwell County Railroad.

The 4601 was built as Illinois Central GP9 9343, in January 1958. She was rebuilt by Illinois Central & Gulf, at their Paducah, Kentucky, shops, in August 1974, as GP10 8339. In 1992, she was rebuilt for the United States Army and designated USAX 4601. She was transferred to the Tennessee Valley Authority in August 2007, as TVAX 4601. By August 2014, she had been sold to Thermal Belt Railway.
