= Caldwell County Railroad =

Railroad in North Carolina, U.S.

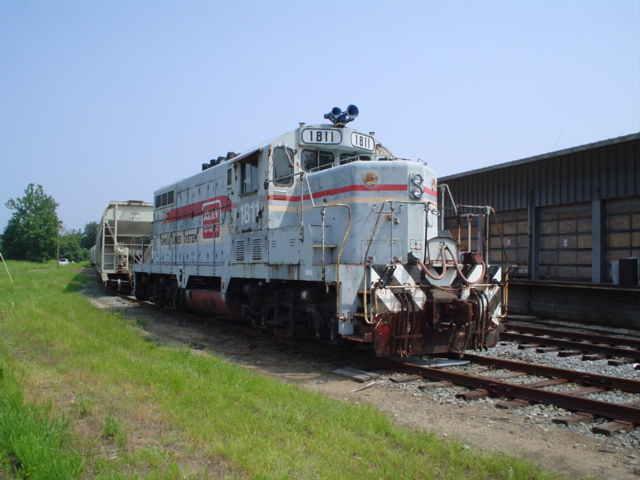
- Caldwell County Railroad #1811, EMD GP-16, photographed July 20, 2004.

Overview
- Headquarters: Morganton, North Carolina
- Reporting mark: CWCY
- Locale: North Carolina
- Dates of operation: 1994–present
- Predecessor: Southern Railway, Norfolk Southern Railway, Carolina & North-Western Railway

Technical
- Track gauge: 4 ft 8 1/2 in (1,435 mm) standard gauge
- Previous gauge: , originally 3 ft (914 mm)
- Length: 17 miles (27 kilometers)

The Caldwell County Railroad (reporting mark CWCY) is a Class III shortline railroad operating over 17 miles (27 kilometers) between Hickory and Lenoir, North Carolina. The CWCY is operated by Southeast Shortlines, Inc., which also operates the Thermal Belt Railway.

== History ==
The Caldwell County Railroad was formed in 1994 when Norfolk Southern sold the 22-mile (35 km) line from Hickory to Lenoir to the Caldwell County Economic Development Commission (CCEDC). The CCEDC subsequently leased the line to the Caldwell County Railroad Company, a subsidiary of Southeast Shortlines Inc.

The line was originally constructed as 3 ft (914 mm) gauge in 1874, under the charter of the Chester & Lenoir. The line was part of the subsequent reorganization into the Carolina & North-Western Railway in 1897, which was absorbed into the Southern Railway around 1940. As part of the Thoroughbred Shortline Program, the line was spun off to the Carolina and Northwestern Railroad, which operated the line from 1990 to 1994.

On March 21, 2007, the CWCY filed a request with the Surface Transportation Board to abandon 5 miles (8 km) of its line near Lenoir to near Valmead. The request was approved on July 9, 2007.

== Operations ==
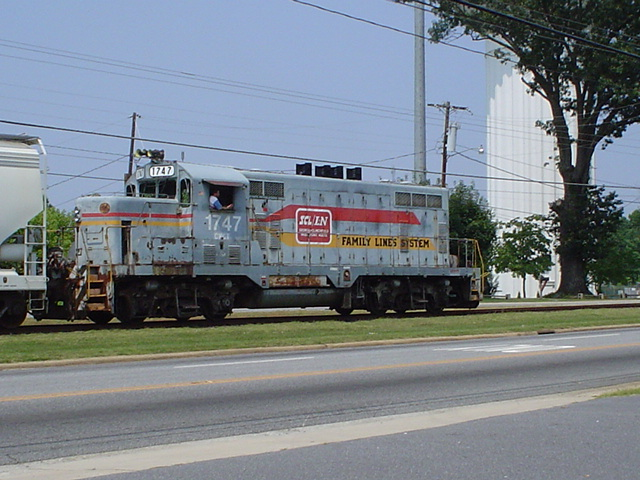
Caldwell County Railroad #1747, EMD GP-16, photographed July 20, 2004.

The railroad serves 5 customers, handling approximately 425 carloads (38,000 short tons or 34,500 metric tons or 33,900 long tons) per year. Commodities carried by the railroad are plastics and building materials. The CWCY interchanges with Norfolk Southern at Hickory.

The CWCY uses radio frequency 161.17500, under license WPGG862, for all of their operations.

The Caldwell County Railroad operates 2 locomotives, numbers 1747 and 1811. Both units are EMD GP-16's and were purchased from CSX. They are still in the Family Lines System livery.

=== Cities/Towns served ===
- Hickory
- Rhodhiss
- Granite Falls
- Hudson
- Lenoir

== See also ==
- Carolina & North-Western Railway
- Southern Railway
- Thoroughbred Shortline Program
