= Camp Lejeune Railroad =

Short-line railroad in North Carolina, United States

Overview
- Headquarters: Jacksonville, North Carolina
- Reporting mark: CPLJ
- Locale: Eastern North Carolina
- Dates of operation: 1941–Present

Technical
- Track gauge: 4 ft 8 1/2 in (1,435 mm) standard gauge
- Length: 5.5 miles (8.9 kilometres)

Camp Lejeune Railroad, (reporting mark CPLJ), is a shortline railroad that was wholly owned by the Department of the Navy. The railroad operates over 25 miles (40 kilometres) of track that is owned by the U.S. Government with a trackage agreement to Norfolk Southern Railway for operations. A small 5.5 mile stretch between MCB Camp Lejeune and downtown City of Jacksonville, NC was abandoned in 1999 and turned over as part of Rails to Trails initiative. However the remaining Camp Lejeune Railroad from MCB Camp Lejeune to Havelock NC, 25 miles in total, is still active and owned by the US Navy.

== History ==
Camp Lejeune Railroad began operations in 1941 to meet the needs for a track connecting the Marine Corps base with the Atlantic Coast Line Railroad in Jacksonville. A 5.5 mile section between the base and Jacksonville was hauling materials for the facility's construction and supplies for the Marines. The line serves as a point of access to the Marine Corps Air Station at Cherry Point and the port at Wilmington.

In October 1999, the Camp Lejeune Railroad Company (CL) filed for abandonment of the 5.5 mile portion between Camp Lejeune and City of Jacksonville NC. The abandonment was approved in December, which officially ended the railroad and operations from Marine Junction in Jacksonville to Camp Lejeune. After abandonment, the railroad was converted to a rail-trail.

A GE 65-ton switcher that served on the line at one time is preserved at the New Hope Valley Railway. The locomotive was acquired as surplus from the Department of Defense.

== Towns served ==
- Havelock
- Camp Lejeune

== See also ==
- Norfolk Southern Railway
- Southern Railway (U.S.)
