= Cheraw and Salisbury Railroad =

The Cheraw and Salisburg Railroad was a shortline railroad that ran between Cheraw, South Carolina, and Wadesboro, North Carolina.

The Cheraw and Salisbury Company was originally incorporated by special charter in 1857 as the Cheraw and Coalfields Railroad. At the company's 1869 annual meeting stockholders approved changing the name of the carrier to Cheraw and Salisbury.

The carrier was originally charged with building a line between Cheraw and Salisbury, North Carolina, a distance of approximately 80 miles (130 km). The line began operation in 1868 and by the early 1870s, according to the 1873 American Railroad Manual for the United States and the Dominion, track had been laid between Cheraw and Wadesboro, a distance of 23 miles (37 km).

The Cheraw and Darlington Railroad acquired the Cheraw and Salisbury in 1892 for $90,000.

The Cheraw and Darlington Railroad was acquired by the Atlantic Coast Line Railroad in 1898, which became part of their Wadesboro—Florence Line. The Atlantic Coast Line Railroad existed until 1967, when it merged with the Seaboard Air Line Railroad to form the Seaboard Coast Line Railroad. After several more mergers and consolidations, it is now part of CSX Transportation.

The line was abandoned in the 1970s.
