= Rockingham Railroad =

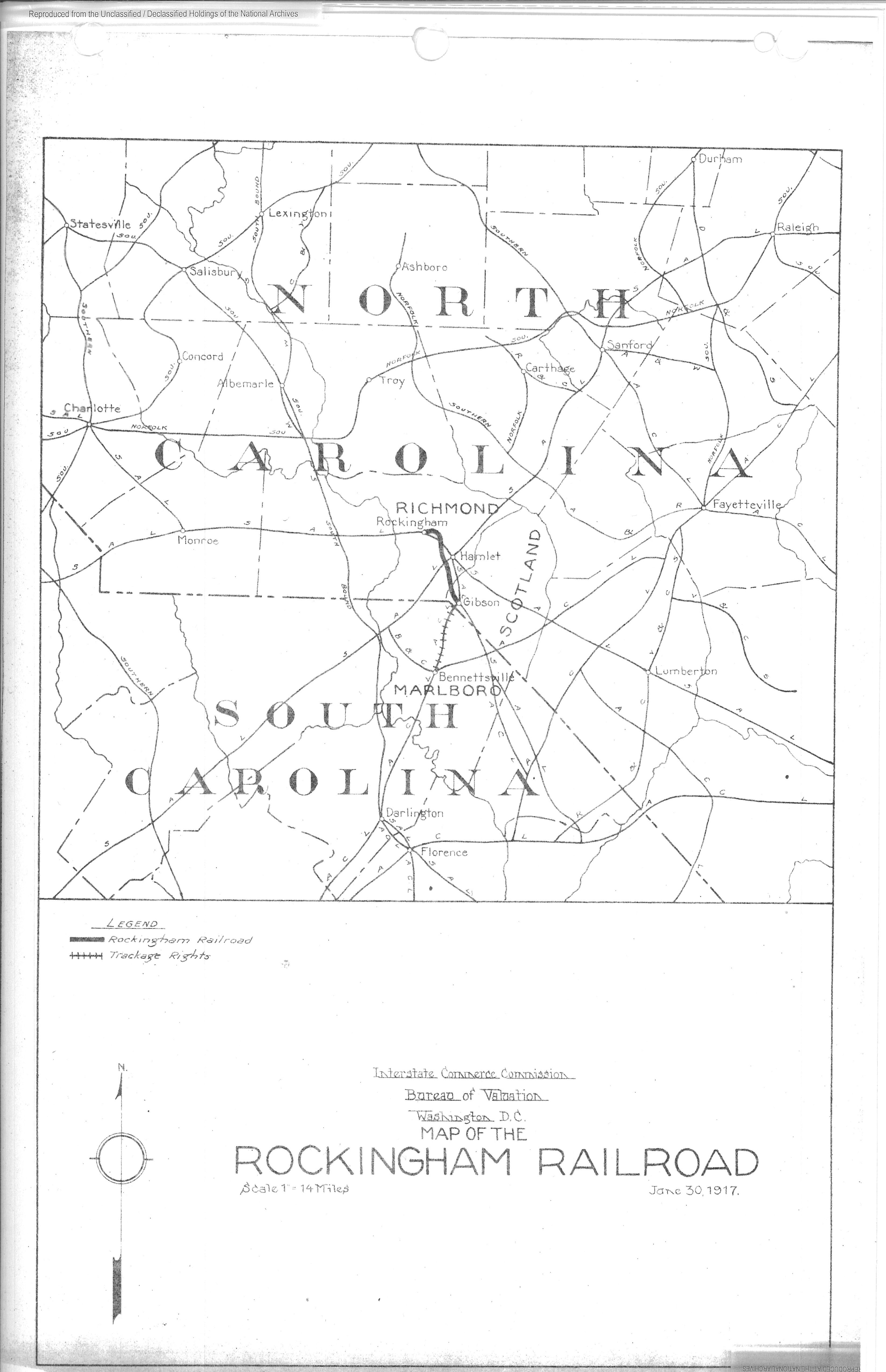
1917 map of the Rockingham Railroad

The Rockingham Railroad was a Southeastern railroad that operated during most of the 20th century.

The Rockingham Railroad was organized in 1910.

The Rockingham Railroad operated a 19-mile route from Roberdel, North Carolina, through Rockingham, to Gibson, North Carolina.

In July 1922 the Atlantic Coast Line Railroad acquired the Rockingham Railroad. The line was abandoned in 1968.
