= Carolina Northern Railroad =

Overview
- Headquarters: Lumberton, North Carolina
- Locale: North and South Carolina, U.S.
- Dates of operation: 1900–1905
- Successor: Raleigh and Charleston Railroad

Technical
- Length: about 40 miles (64 km)

The Carolina Northern Railroad was a shortline railroad that served eastern South Carolina and eastern North Carolina in the early 20th century. The railroad connected Lumberton, North Carolina, and South Marion, South Carolina, serving towns, farms and lumber mills along the route. Passenger trains were run twice a day (except Sundays) in each direction, southbound in the morning and northbound in the afternoon. It was sold under foreclosure and reorganized as the Raleigh and Charleston Railroad in 1905.

== History ==
The Carolina Northern was chartered in consolidation with the Carolina and Northern Railroad of South Carolina to extend from Lumberton, NC, to South Marion, SC, a distance of about 40 miles (64 km). The railroad was incorporated in February 1899. Construction began soon after with the first carloads of 60 lb/yd rails arriving on August 11. The line first opened on January 1, 1900, with the official completion coming on December 1, 1901. Extensions were proposed in January 1902 from Lumberton to Fayetteville and from Marion to Charleston, South Carolina, with the ultimate goal of creating a through route from Raleigh to Charleston.

The carrier entered receivership on December 2, 1902, after which it was sold under foreclosure and subsequently reorganized as the Raleigh and Charleston Railroad.

The Raleigh and Charleston Railroad Company was incorporated in 1905. In December 1911, the Seaboard Air Line Railroad acquired the company. The stretch between Lumberton and Lake View, South Carolina, was abandoned in 1933, while the remaining section from Lake View to Marion was abandoned in 1941.
