= Carolina and Northwestern Railway =

US railroad

Technical
- Track gauge: 4 ft 8 1/2 in (1,435 mm) standard gauge
- Previous gauge: 3 ft (914 mm)(?)

The Carolina & Northwestern Railway (Ca&NW) was a railroad that served South Carolina and North Carolina from 1897 until January 1, 1974. The original line was operated by the Ca&NW as a separate railroad controlled by the Southern Railway until 1974 when the name was changed to the Norfolk Southern Railway. On June 1, 1982, Southern Railway and Norfolk and Western Railroad merged to form Norfolk Southern Railway. Choosing to use the name 'Norfolk Southern Railway' for the merger, in 1981, the original Ca&NW line along with original Norfolk Southern Railway was renamed Carolina and Northwestern once again. In the early 1950s several shortline subsidiaries of the Southern Railway were leased to the Ca&NW for operation, with these lines remaining a part of the Ca&NW into the 1980s.

== History ==
The carrier traces its beginnings back to the Kings Mountain Railroad that ran from Chester, South Carolina, to York, South Carolina, before the Civil War. The Kings Mountain Railroad was begun in 1855 but was destroyed by the Union Army during the American Civil War and was not rebuilt after the conflict.

The route lay abandoned for almost eight years until the creation of the Chester and Lenoir Narrow Gauge Railroad in 1873. Within a decade the Chester & Lenoir had extended the line to Lenoir, North Carolina. At over 120 miles (190 km), the Chester & Lenoir was the largest narrow gauge railroad in the Carolinas.

Over the next decade, the railroad operated under the umbrella of the Richmond and Danville Railroad.

When the Richmond and Danville was re-organized as the Southern Railway in 1894, the Chester & Lenoir operated on its own for a short while. By 1896, it went into receivership, and the following year was re-organized as the Carolina & Northwestern Railway. Though technically controlled by the Southern, this shortline carrier, more than any other in the Southern Railway family, was allowed to operate almost autonomously.

By 1902, the Carolina & Northwestern Railway was converted to 4 ft 8 1/2 in (1,435 mm) standard gauge track, and it purchased a controlling interest in a logging railroad, the Caldwell and Northern, that ran from Lenoir to Collettsville, North Carolina. By 1906, the railroad had been expanded to Edgemont, North Carolina, making the line nearly 150 miles (240 km) long, further increasing access to the timber in the mountains north and west of Hickory, North Carolina.

In 1912, new shops were built in Hickory and within 10 years a locomotive was even built within the railroad’s shops.

In 1917 it acquired the Northampton & Hertford Railroad which had acquired the Gumberry & Jackson Railroad in 1894.

By the mid 1930s, the Carolina and Northwestern was only operating one freight train a day except Sundays between Chester and Lenoir. By 1938, the railroad abandoned the line from west Lenoir to Edgemont. The Carolina and Northwestern was absorbed into the Southern Railway system around 1940.

In 1943, the Carolina and Northwestern was only operating one passenger train a day between Chester and Edgemont. Passenger service was soon discontinued in 1947. In March 1948, the carrier had completely dropped steam (with Southern Railway 2-8-0 #544 having the honor of being the last steam locomotive on the line) and replaced it with diesel locomotives. The Carolina & Northwestern was one of the first completely dieselized railroads in the southeast.

The section of the line between Chester and York was abandoned around 1972. The section from York to Clover was abandoned in 1981. By the late 1980s, the line had been abandoned all the way to just north of the North Carolina state line, near Bowling Green, South Carolina.

Around 1990, the track from Newton to Lincolnton, North Carolina was abandoned by the Norfolk Southern. The North Carolina Department of Transportation has railbanked the line from South Newton, NC to an area South of Maiden, NC where the end of the line stops at U.S. Highway 321.

In 1994, Norfolk Southern sold the original 22-mile (35 km) line from Hickory, NC to Lenoir, NC to the Caldwell County Economic Development Commission (CCEDC). The CCEDC subsequently leased the line to the Caldwell County Railroad Company, a subsidiary of Southeast Shortlines Inc.

The five-mile (8 km) stretch of railroad track between Gastonia and Dallas was abandoned on or about August 20, 2003.
