= Cheraw and Darlington Railroad =

- Original route (click to enlarge)

Overview
- Dates of operation: 1853–1898
- Successor: Atlantic Coast Line Railroad

Technical
- Track gauge: 5 ft (1,524 mm)

The Cheraw and Darlington Railroad was a 26-mile (42 km) 5 ft (1,524 mm) gauge shortline railroad that served South Carolina and, later, North Carolina, beginning before the American Civil War. The gauge was changed to 4 ft 9 in (1,448 mm) in 1886.

== History ==
The Cheraw and Darlington was chartered in 1849 and began operations in 1853, initially serving the area between Cheraw, South Carolina, and Darlington, South Carolina.

Like many Southern lines, the Cheraw and Darlington Railroad suffered during the American Civil War. In the waning days of the conflict, a considerable portion of the carrier's infrastructure was ordered destroyed by invading Union forces. Maj. Gen. William T. Sherman sent a mounted infantry force to Florence, South Carolina, to level the depots, trestle-work, bridges, and public buildings and stores.

In the course of the action, which took place in March 1865, 500 yards (460 m) of trestle work, two depots, 11 freight and four passenger cars were destroyed, along with a considerable amount of supplies. However, the Confederate cavalry and infantry was able to stop the Union cavalry from completing some of this mission.

By 1867, the Cheraw and Darlington was running again, going from Cheraw to Florence and back daily.

As of 1887, the line had four locomotives, three passenger cars and 29 freight cars.

The Cheraw and Darlington acquired the Cheraw and Salisbury Railroad, in 1892 for $90,000. With the purchase came an extension north to Wadesboro, North Carolina.

The Cheraw and Darlington Railroad was acquired by the Atlantic Coast Line Railroad in 1898, which became part of their Wadesboro—Florence Line.

The Atlantic Coast Line Railroad existed between 1898 and 1967, when it merged with the Seaboard Air Line Railroad to form the Seaboard Coast Line Railroad. After several more mergers and consolidations, it is now part of CSX Transportation.

The line is still in service from Florence to Floyds and is now operated by the South Carolina Central Railroad.
