= Winston-Salem Southbound Railway =

Overview
- Headquarters: Winston-Salem, North Carolina
- Reporting mark: WSS
- Locale: central North Carolina
- Dates of operation: 1910–

Technical
- Track gauge: 4 ft 8 1/2 in (1,435 mm) standard gauge

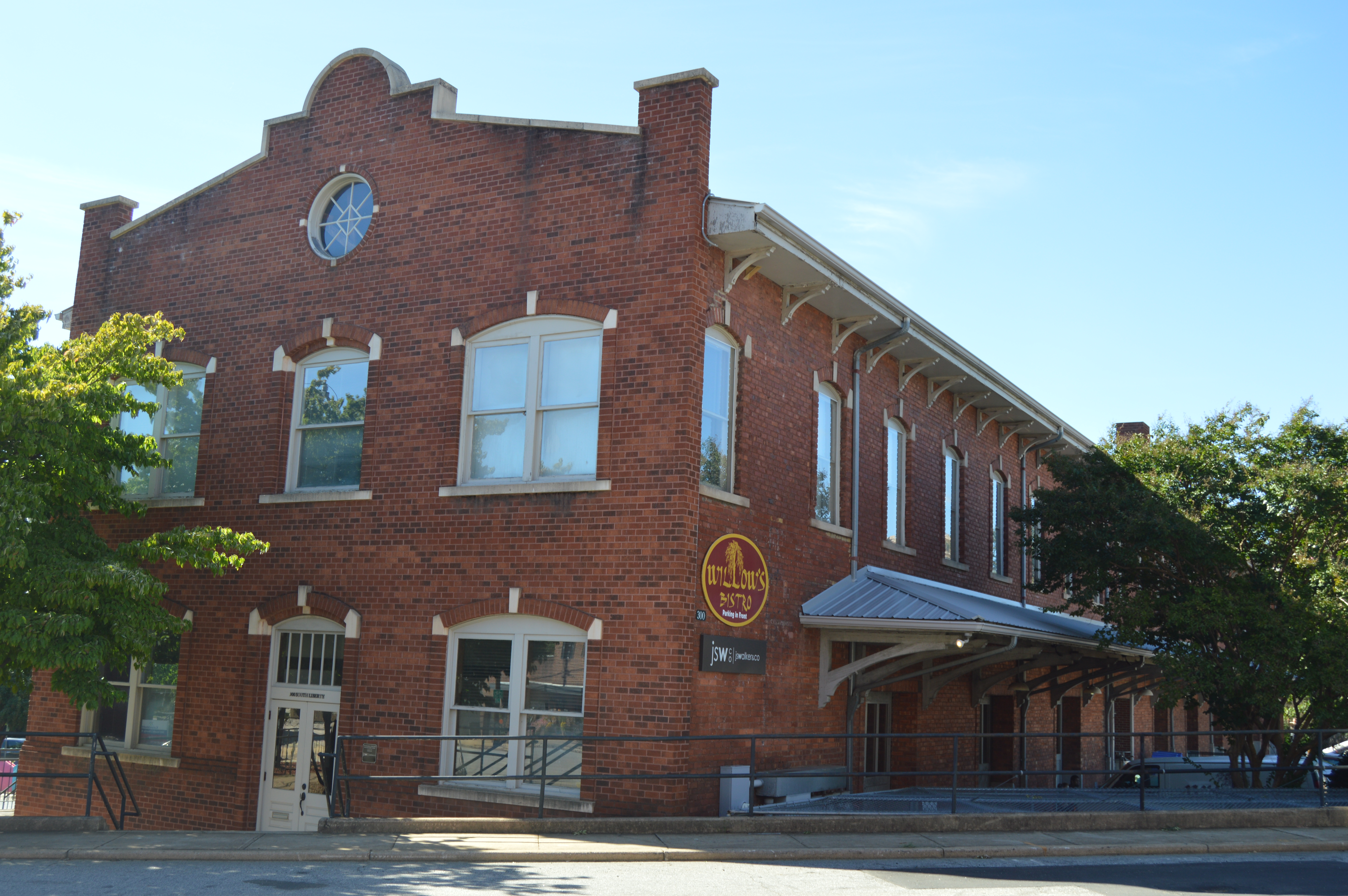
Former offices in Winston-Salem

The Winston-Salem Southbound Railway (reporting mark WSS) is a 90-mile (140 km) short-line railroad jointly owned by CSX Transportation and the Norfolk Southern Railway (NS), which provide it with equipment. It connects with NS at the north end in Winston-Salem, CSX at the south end in Wadesboro, and in between with NS at Lexington and Whitney, the subsidiary High Point, Thomasville and Denton Railroad at High Rock, and the Aberdeen, Carolina and Western Railway at Norwood. Originally owned jointly by the Atlantic Coast Line Railroad and Norfolk and Western Railway, predecessors to CSX and NS, it was completed in November 1910.

In 1957, the railroad retired its last steam locomotive in favor of diesel power. The EMD GP9 was the diesel locomotive of choice.

In June 1960 the WSS acquired full control of the connecting High Point, Thomasville and Denton Railroad, which is similarly operated with equipment from both owners.

Between 1913 and 1985 the railroad was headquartered in the Winston-Salem Southbound Railway Freight Warehouse and Office. It was listed on the National Register of Historic Places in 1991.

Commodities carried by the railroad are grain, sand, gravel, stone, forest products, paper products, coal, coke, cement, clay fertilizer, aluminum, chemicals, iron, and steel. Principal shippers are Corn Products Company of Winston-Salem, a manufacturer of corn syrup and related products, and Owens Brockway Glass Company of Eller, a manufacturer of glass products.

On April 16, 2010, notice was published of the intent to merge the High Point, Thomasville, and Denton Railroad into the Winston-Salem Southbound Railway, effective May 1, 2010.

== Motive power ==
The WSS used a variety of steam locomotives from 1910 until 1957, since the Norfolk and Western Railway continued to operate with steam power, so there was no hurry to dieselize the Winston-Salem Southbound Railway. On April 22, 1957, the railroad caved-in, and four new EMD GP9 diesels arrived, priced at about $190,000 each. With the arrival of diesels, the water tanks and coaling stations of the steam era would soon fall. The four GP9s were purchased from the N&W, and the swiftly-dieselizing ACL; the two companies then in ownership of the WSS. They were re-painted into two different paint schemes and served from the 1950s to the late 1960s, when the WSS, realizing it wasn't cost-effective to maintain servicing facilities, sent the GP9s back to their respective owners and started to lease equipment from the ACL and N&W. To this day, the WSS continues to lease road power from the successors of the ACL (CSX) and N&W (NS).

The GP9 units were numbered 1501 (N&W), 1502 (N&W), 1503 (ACL), 1504 (ACL). The latter were the only two GP9 on ACL roster; one of them was rebuilt to GP16 by the Seaboard Coast Line and still runs today, owned by R.J. Corman.

== See also ==
- CSX Transportation
- Norfolk Southern Railway
