= Charleston, Cincinnati and Chicago Railroad =

The Charleston, Cincinnati and Chicago Railroad, informally known as the Triple C, was a Southeastern railroad that operated in the late 19th century.

The company was formed in 1886 with the idea of extending a rail line from Charleston, South Carolina, to Ashland, Kentucky, in an effort to mine coal and iron ore found in the Appalachians. Construction began at Rutherfordton, North Carolina, with rails being laid both north and south.

In 1890, major investor Baker Brothers & Co. failed and a court-appointed receiver was ordered for the Charleston, Cincinnati and Chicago. Three years later, the line was sold to its bondholders and a new corporation was established: The Ohio River and Charleston Railway.

== See also ==
- Georgetown and North Carolina Railroad - predecessor of the Triple C
