= Transportation in North Carolina =

There are many different types of transportation in North Carolina, including air, rail, mass transit, and major highways. North Carolina is a rapidly growing state with over 10.4 million people and requires multiple types of transportation. Currently, NC has 10 commercial and many municipal airports, a passenger rail called NC By Train operated by North Carolina in partnership with Amtrak with many different routes, public bus transportation in cities like Raleigh and Charlotte, and highways that span the State.

== International/regional airports ==
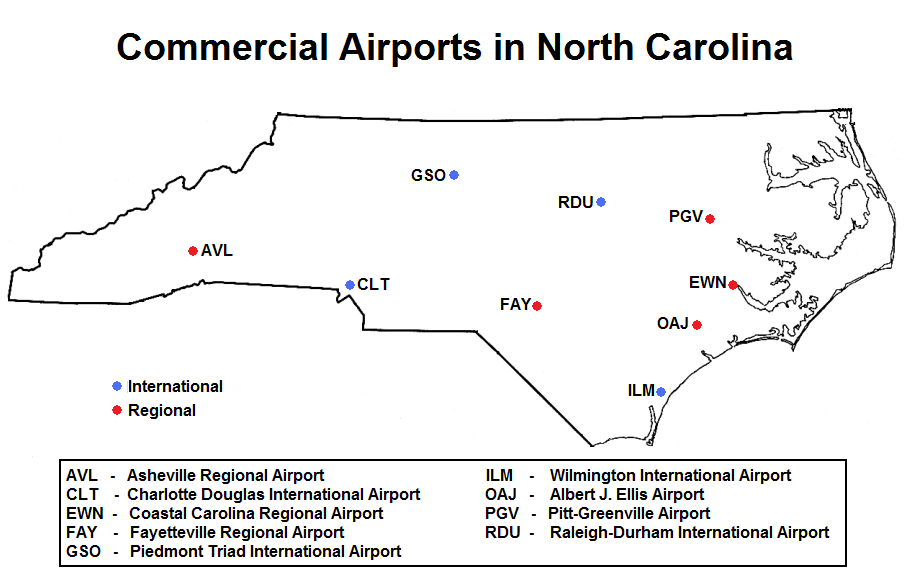
Commercial Airports in North Carolina

=== Commercial Passenger ===
- Albert J. Ellis Airport (Jacksonville)
- Asheville Regional Airport (Asheville)
- Charlotte/Douglas International Airport (Charlotte)
- Coastal Carolina Regional Airport (New Bern)
- Concord-Padgett Regional Airport (Concord)
- Fayetteville Regional Airport (Fayetteville)
- Piedmont Triad International Airport (Greensboro/Winston-Salem/High Point)
- Pitt-Greenville Airport (Greenville)
- Raleigh-Durham International Airport (Raleigh/Durham)
- Wilmington International Airport (Wilmington)

=== Non-commercial ===
- Hickory Regional Airport (Hickory)
- Kinston Regional Jetport (Kinston)

== Rail ==
Amtrak operates several passenger rail lines in North Carolina. Each train is daily except the Piedmont which runs four round trips daily.

- The Carolinian between New York and Charlotte serves Rocky Mount, Wilson, Selma-Smithfield, Raleigh, State Fair (conditional), Cary, Durham, Hillsborough (future), Burlington, Greensboro, High Point, Lexington (conditional), Salisbury, Kannapolis, and Charlotte.
- The Piedmont between Raleigh and Charlotte operates tour round trips per day and serves the same stations as the Carolinian.
- The Crescent between New York and New Orleans serves Greensboro, High Point, Salisbury, Charlotte, and Gastonia.
- The Palmetto between New York and Savannah, Georgia serves Rocky Mount, Wilson, Selma-Smithfield, and Fayetteville.
- The Silver Meteor between New York and Miami, Florida serves Rocky Mount and Fayetteville.
- The Floridian between New York and Tampa, Florida serves Rocky Mount, Raleigh, Cary, Southern Pines, and Hamlet.

The state subsidizes both the Piedmont and Carolinian intercity rail between Raleigh and Charlotte and serving the Research Triangle. Amtrak has announced a third subsidized train that will run between Raleigh and Charlotte. This train will run midday to complement the Piedmont and Carolinian and include stops in Greensboro, Burlington, and High Point. There is also the Crescent which runs from New York to Atlanta during the early morning before dawn.

The planned Southeast High Speed Rail Corridor includes service along the old Seaboard Air Line Railroad mainline, which is now CSX's underutilized "S" line, north of Raleigh, and the North Carolina Railroad lines south of Raleigh currently used by the Carolinian and Piedmont services. In 2022, the USDOT granted North Carolina $58 million to start the Raleigh-Richmond segment of this corridor. The S-Line has also received a “$1.09 billion FRA Federal-State Partnership for Intercity Passenger Rail (FSP) grant” which “is the largest grant NCDOT has received to date and the third largest grant awarded in the country under the FSP grant program in 2023” according to NCDOT project outline. The outline also highlights the potential for the S-Line to provide a top speed of 110 miles-per-hour for passenger rail and to expand coverage of undeserved and isolated areas void of reliable and efficient public transportation interconnections. On July 1, 2024, Governor Roy Cooper and Transportation Secretary Pete Buttigieg broke ground on the S-Line project marking the beginning of widespread infrastructure investments across the state aimed at improving pedestrian safety and transportation efficiency.

The State has also explored several other rail options, which would include GoTriangle Commuter service from Raleigh to Durham, and potentially Fayetteville. Some of the proposed routes are:

- Raleigh to Wilmington (via Goldsboro/Fayetteville)
- Raleigh to Greenville
- Sanford to Henderson (via Raleigh)
- Salisbury to Asheville

== Mass transit ==
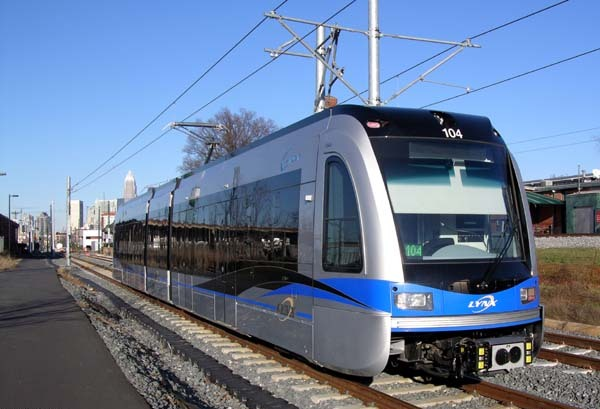
LYNX light rail car in Charlotte

Several cities are served by mass transit systems.

The Charlotte Area Transit System (CATS) operates a historical trolley line and 76 bus and shuttle routes serving Charlotte and its satellite cities. In 2007, it opened the LYNX light rail line connecting Charlotte with suburban Pineville. Future plans include expanding LYNX Light Rail as well as implementation of Commuter Rail and Streetcar. The Gold Line streetcar will be a 10-mile, 37 stop streetcar line that will connect the Blue Line light rail, Silver Line light rail, Red Line Commuter Rail, and the Charlotte Gateway Station. Additionally, UNC Charlotte has its own bus system called Niner Transit, offering destinations primarily on campus with some off-campus stops.

Raleigh is serviced by GoRaleigh. GoRaleigh also operates a historical trolley line giving tours of the historic areas of Downtown Raleigh and other areas of interest in the Capital City. It operates 35 bus routes, 4 of which are express routes, and a downtown circulator called the R-Line which services the entertainment and shopping areas of Downtown Raleigh. N.C. State University within the City of Raleigh operates its own bus line named the Wolfline to provide service to the university's students and employees.

The GoCary transit system has 10 routes as of mid-November 2024. These routes are outlined on their interactive map and schedule website. The most recent route added was the Downtown Loop service opened June 1, 2024. As of March of 2024, GoCary has explored the possibility of adding three new routes that would expand and replace certain routes. Those routes are Route 11, Route 12, and a Downtown Circulator route. The route map and possible alternative routes are outlined in a service changes press release from GoCary.

Durham is serviced by GoDurham which operates 22 bus routes, 1 of which is a special service running from Northern High School to Downtown Durham twice a day on school days only.

Wake Forest is served by GoRaleigh which operates 2 loop routes there, one does a clockwise loop and the other is counterclockwise.

The Fayetteville Area System of Transit (FAST) serves the city with seventeen bus routes and 21 additional vehicles to assist people with disabilities who cannot utilize the bus routes.

GoTriangle operates buses that serve the Triangle region and connect to municipal bus systems in Raleigh, Durham, Chapel Hill, Cary and Apex.

Greensboro is serviced by the Greensboro Transit Authority (GTA), which operates 14 bus routes. Additionally, the Higher Education Area Transit (HEAT) system provides service to students who attend the following institutions: Bennett College, Elon University School of Law, Greensboro College, Guilford College, Guilford Technical Community College, North Carolina A&T State University, and University of North Carolina at Greensboro. The HEAT service provides transportation between campuses and various other destinations, including downtown Greensboro.

Winston-Salem Transit Authority (WSTA) operates 30 bus routes around the city of Winston-Salem; additionally, WSTA recently completed construction of a central downtown multi-modal transportation center with 16 covered bus bays adjacent to a large enclosed lobby/waiting area. There are future plans being discussed for a $52 million streetcar system connecting Piedmont Triad Research Park/Downtown with Wake Forest Baptist Medical Center.

Piedmont Authority for Regional Transportation (PART) is the Triad's 10-county regional organization with the goal of enhancing all forms of transportation through regional cooperation. PART Express Bus provides express shuttle service to each major Triad city from Piedmont Triad International Airport, while Connections Express connects the Triad to Duke and UNC Medical Centers. PART is also administering and developing several rail service studies that include both commuter and intercity rail.

Wilmington's Wave Transit operates eleven bus lines, 3 shuttle routes, and one trolley line within the city with over 400 bus stops.

In July 2008, Western Piedmont Regional Transit Authority began serving Burke, Caldwell, Catawba and Alexander counties in the region just west of Charlotte, and include the cities of Conover, Hickory, Lenoir, Morganton, and Taylorsville.

Jacksonville recently began a trial bus system called the LOOP, which runs two routes through the city and nearby Camp Lejeune. But this loop has yet to be made permanent.

Asheville operates the Asheville Transit System, which consists of sixteen bus lines providing service throughout the City of Asheville and to Black Mountain, North Carolina.

Greenville is serviced by Greenville Area Transit (GREAT), as well as East Carolina University Transit, which focuses on transit for students, faculty and staff of ECU, and Vidant Medical Center transportation, which provides shuttles from parking lots, as well as in between offices in Greenville. Pitt County is serviced by Pitt Area Transit, which also operates within Greenville City limits.

== Major highways ==
The North Carolina Highway System consists of a vast network of Interstate Highways, including Interstate 26, Interstate 40, Interstate 73, Interstate 74, Interstate 77, Interstate 85 and Interstate 95, U.S. Highways, and state highways. North Carolina has the largest state-maintained highway network in the United States, with 77,400 miles (124,600 km) of roadway.

== See also ==
- Plug-in electric vehicles in North Carolina
