= Harrisburg station (North Carolina) =

Railway station in Harrisburg, North Carolina

Harrisburg, NC

General information
- Location: 3945 NC Highway 49 South; Harrisburg, North Carolina; United States
- Coordinates: 35.3224°N 80.6410°W
- Owner: Town of Harrisburg
- Line: NCRR Corridor
Future services
Preceding station	Amtrak	Following station
Charlotte Terminus	Carolinian	Kannapolis toward New York
Charlotte Terminus	Piedmont	Kannapolis toward Raleigh
Location

Harrisburg station is a planned infill train station in Harrisburg, North Carolina, located on the North Carolina Railroad (NCRR). When it is completed, Amtrak's Carolinian and Piedmont will serve the station. The station building will also have office space for the Cabarrus County Sheriff's Department. It will be the nearest Amtrak station to the University of North Carolina at Charlotte.

== History ==
The NCRR purchased the 2.982-acre (1.207 ha) parcel on August 16, 2019, to construct a rail station. The town will reimburse NCRR for the land and cost of adding office space to the station.
