= High Point station =

Train station in High Point, North Carolina, U.S.

High Point, NC
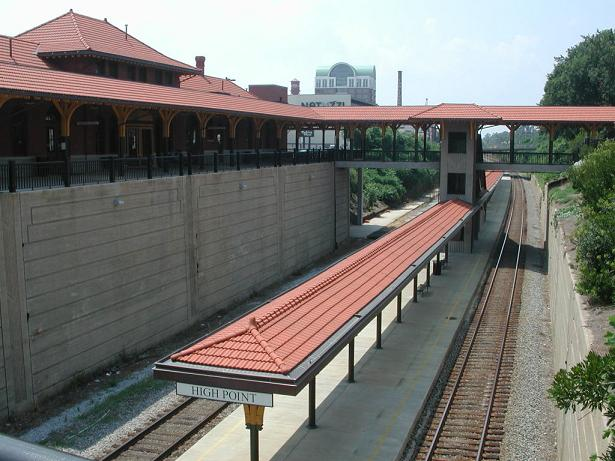

General information
- Location: 100 West High Avenue; High Point, North Carolina; United States
- Coordinates: 35°57′26″N 80°00′23″W
- Owner: City of High Point
- Lines: NCRR Corridor; Danville District
- Platforms: 1 island platform
- Tracks: 2
- Bus operators: HPTS
- Connections: PART; Amtrak Thruway

Construction
- Structure type: Below-grade
- Parking: 73 spaces
- Accessible: Yes
- Architectural style: Richardsonian Romanesque

Other information
- Status: Unstaffed; attendant available
- Station code: Amtrak: HPT

History
- Opened: 1907
- Rebuilt: 2002–2003
- Original company: Southern Railway

Passengers
- FY 2025: 43,391 (Amtrak)

Services
Preceding station	Amtrak	Following station
Salisbury toward New Orleans	Crescent	Greensboro toward New York
Salisbury toward Charlotte	Carolinian	Greensboro toward New York
Lexington (seasonal) toward Charlotte	Carolinian	Greensboro toward New York
Salisbury toward Charlotte	Piedmont	Greensboro toward Raleigh
Lexington (seasonal) toward Charlotte	Piedmont	Greensboro toward Raleigh
Former services
Preceding station	Southern Railway	Following station
Thomasville toward Birmingham	Main Line	Jamestown toward Washington, D.C.
Terminus	High Point – Asheboro	Trinity toward Asheboro
Location

High Point station is an intermodal transit station in High Point, North Carolina, United States. Its main building serves as an Amtrak train station, while the Broad Avenue Terminal serves as the bus terminus for both High Point Transit System (HPTS) and the Piedmont Authority for Regional Transportation (PART). The station is located in downtown High Point and near the West High Street Historic District.

== History ==
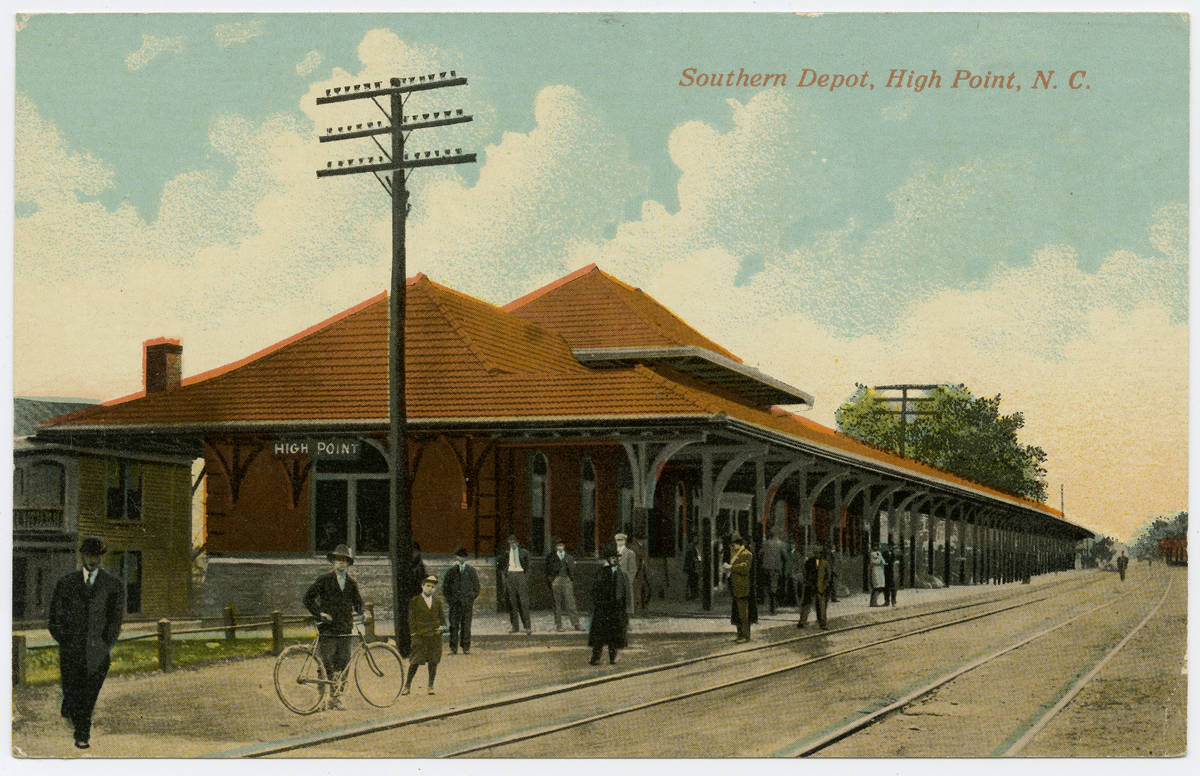
Southern Depot, High Point, North Carolina

High Point Station was originally built in 1907 by Southern Railway. It was designed in Richardsonian Romanesque, with a rusticated ashlar base and a tiled hip roof.

In the late 1930s, a trench was dug so rail and automobile traffic would not impede each other through downtown High Point; a walkway across the tracks and a staircase to an island platform at track level was constructed.

In 1979, Amtrak took over passenger operations at the station from Southern Railway.

Between 2002 and 2003, a $6.8 million renovation project was done that included making the station ADA accessible; the station reopened on December 9, 2003.

== Services ==
The train station, operated by Amtrak, provides inter-city rail service via three routes: Crescent, Carolinian and Piedmont. Amtrak operating hours are 12:00am–4:00am, 7:00am–12:30pm and 3:30pm–9:00pm; it includes a Quik-Trak kiosk, waiting area and restrooms. No baggage service is available at this station. A station attendant is available on site during operating hours.

=== Broad Avenue Terminal ===
The Broad Avenue Terminal, operated by HPTS, provides local bus service that operates Monday-Friday at 5:45am–7:30pm and Saturday at 8:45am–5:30pm, closed on Sunday. PART also operates two intercity bus routes from the terminal, Route 3 (High Point Express) and Route 9 (Davidson Business 85 Express), which travel to Greensboro and Thomasville/Lexington, respectively.

Amtrak Thruway service to Winston-Salem State University (Union Station) and Winston-Salem (Clark Campbell Transportation Center) is provided four times a day, Monday–Saturday. This service is operated by PART, designated as Route 5 (NC Amtrak Connector). Amtrak bus departing designations are #6173, #6175, #6177, and #6179; arriving designations are #6174, #6176, #6178, and #6180.

== Station layout ==
The station building is located on West High Avenue, with a walkway that goes across a 35 ft (11 m) deep trench to the Broad Avenue Terminal. The station's island platform is located in the trench, connected to the walkway by stairs and an elevator.

Station layout
G	Street level	Entrance/exit, station building, walkway, parking, bus terminal
P	Track 1	← Crescent, Carolinian toward New York (Greensboro) ← Piedmont toward Raleigh (Greensboro)
P	Island platform
P	Track 2	Crescent toward New Orleans (Salisbury) → Carolinian, Piedmont toward Charlotte (Lexington or Salisbury) →
