= J. Douglas Galyon Depot =

Train station in North Carolina, US

J. Douglas Galyon Depot Greensboro, North Carolina
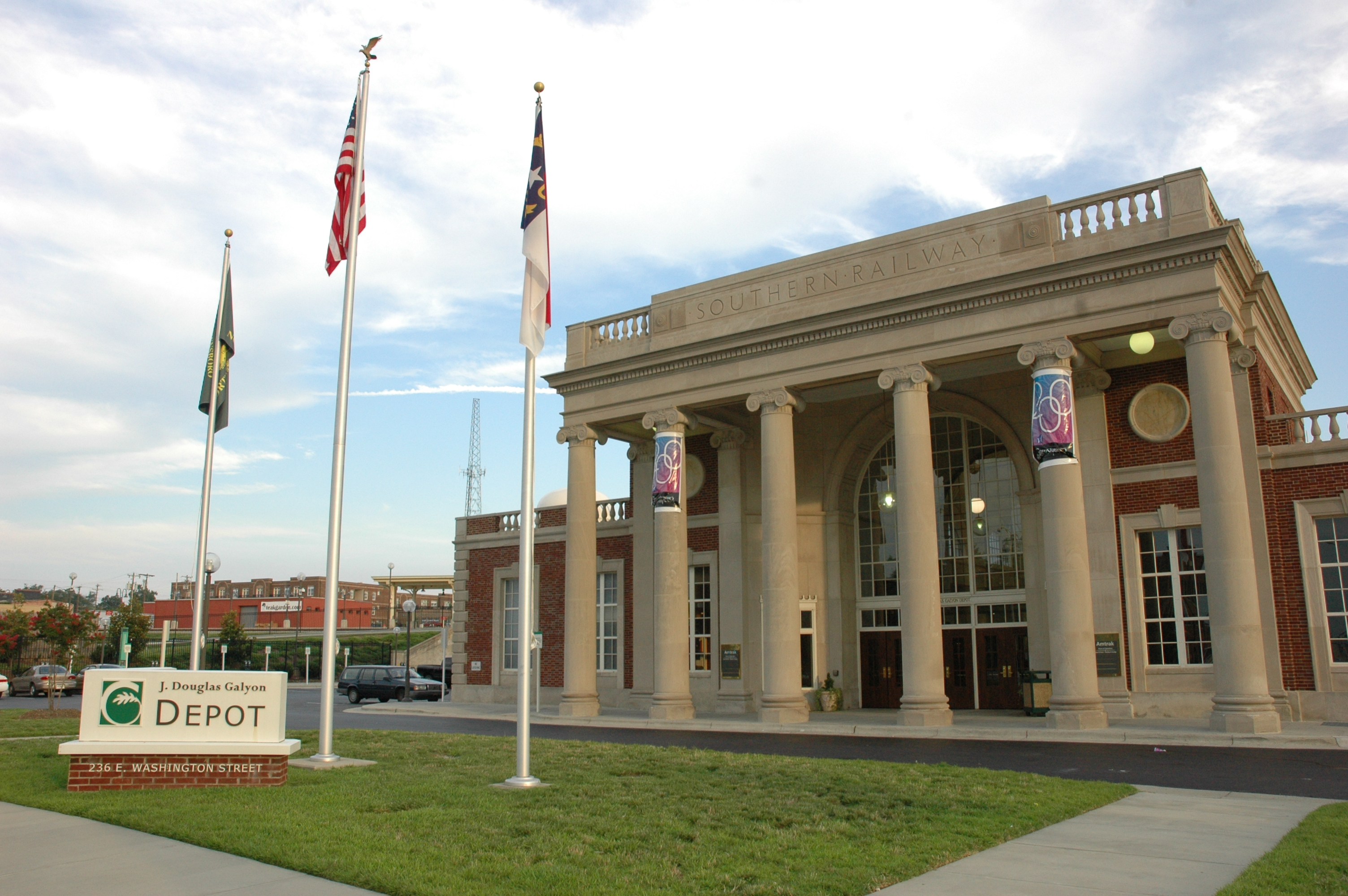

General information
- Location: 236 East Washington Street; Greensboro, North Carolina; United States
- Coordinates: 36°04′10″N 79°47′14″W
- Owner: City of Greensboro
- Lines: NCRR Corridor; Danville District
- Platforms: 2 island platforms
- Tracks: 4
- Bus stands: 22
- Bus operators: GTA; Greyhound Lines
- Connections: PART; Sunway Charters

Construction
- Structure type: At-grade
- Parking: 102 spaces
- Accessible: Yes
- Architect: Alfred T. Fellheimer
- Architectural style: Beaux-Arts

Other information
- Station code: Amtrak: GRO

History
- Opened: 1927, reopened 2005
- Closed: 1979
- Rebuilt: 2001–2003
- Original company: Southern Railway

Passengers
- FY 2025: 210,652 (Amtrak)

Services
Preceding station	Amtrak	Following station
High Point toward Charlotte	Carolinian	Burlington toward New York
High Point toward Charlotte	Piedmont	Burlington toward Raleigh
High Point toward New Orleans	Crescent	Danville toward New York
Former services
Preceding station	Southern Railway	Following station
Jamestown toward Birmingham	Main Line	Brown's Summit toward Washington, D.C.
Pomona toward North Wilkesboro	North Wilkesboro – Morehead City	McLeansburg toward Morehead City
Battle Ground toward Mount Airy	Mount Airy – Sanford	Pleasant Garden toward Sanford
Location

J. Douglas Galyon Depot, also known as Greensboro station, is an intermodal transit facility in Greensboro, North Carolina, United States. Located at 236 East Washington Street in downtown Greensboro, it serves Amtrak passenger rail and is the city's main hub for local and intercity buses.

The station was built in 1927. Train service was moved to a new building outside downtown in 1979. The historic station was renovated and reopened as a transit center in 2005.

== History ==
The station was originally built in 1927 as the Greensboro Southern Railway Depot. It was a replacement for an 1899 Southern Railway Depot that still exists today, albeit without the gabled-third story and cupola it had in the past. The 1927 depot was donated to the city in 1978, a year before the Southern Railroad finally gave up passenger service.

Efforts to return service to the old station began in 1993. It was heavily renovated from 2001 to 2005, and reopened to the public on October 1, 2005. The restored station was named for James Douglas "Doug" Galyon (1930–2019), a longtime civic leader in Greensboro who was a member of the North Carolina Board of Transportation from 1992 to 2008, serving for most of that time as the board's chairman.

Designed by the New York architectural firm of Alfred T. Fellheimer & Steward Wagner, the 1927 Beaux-Arts facade of the Greensboro station features Ionic columns, a full entablature, and a three-story arched entry. Inside, the ticketing area features a vast mural displaying the service area of the Southern Railway system in the 1920s.

Until 1970 the Southern Railway operated the Asheville Special from Asheville and Winston-Salem to Greensboro. Until the 1960s that train had linked with the Augusta Special at Greensboro and had continued to Washington, D.C., and New York City. Until the 1960s the Carolina Special went from Cincinnati to Asheville, with the North Carolina branch of the train going to Greensboro. Until 1953 or 1954 the Carolina Special went further east to Goldsboro in the eastern part of the state.

=== Former Amtrak station ===
Open in 1979, the station was located along Oakland Avenue, at the Pomona freight yard, in a facility owned by Southern Railway (later becoming Norfolk Southern Railway in 1982). The building was split with passenger service, operated by Amtrak, and freight service that included a control tower for the yard. It had one side platform and a fence that separated it from the short-term (30 minutes) parking area for passengers. The station was closed in 2005 when Amtrak moved passenger operations back to downtown Greensboro. The station half of the building was afterwards converted as a police station for the Norfolk Southern Railway Police Department.

== Services ==
The train station (lower level) is operated by Amtrak, providing inter-city rail service via three routes: Crescent, Carolinian and Piedmont. The station is open 24-hours and includes a ticket office, passenger assistance, baggage service and waiting area.

The transit center (upper level) is shared between the Greensboro Transit Authority (GTA) and Greyhound Lines. Both operators have their own tickets/information and waiting areas, with GTA operating daily at scheduled times and Greyhound operating 24-hours. Outside, there are 22 bus bays, 18 dedicated to GTA and four to Greyhound Lines. Bus connections from other operators include the Piedmont Authority for Regional Transportation (PART) and Sunway Charters (Mountaineer Express East-West and Triad-Danville Connector).

== Station layout ==
The station has two levels identified as lower level and upper level, with a total space of 73,153 square feet (6,796.1 m^{2}).

Station layout
UL	Upper Level	Transit Center (GTA. PART, Sunway Charters and Greyhound/Flixbus)
LL	Lower Level	Entrance/Exit, ticketing, baggage check, waiting area, parking, lunch room and convenience store (Carolina Blues)
LL	Tunnel	To platforms 1 and 2 (Stairwell, escalator, elevator for each platform)
P	Track 2	← Crescent toward New Orleans (High Point)
P	Island platform (Platform 1)
P	Track 1	Crescent toward New York (Danville) →
P	Track 2	← Carolinian, Piedmont toward Charlotte (High Point)
P	Island platform (Platform 2)
P	Track 1	Carolinian toward New York (Burlington) → Piedmont toward Raleigh (Burlington) →

== Gallery ==
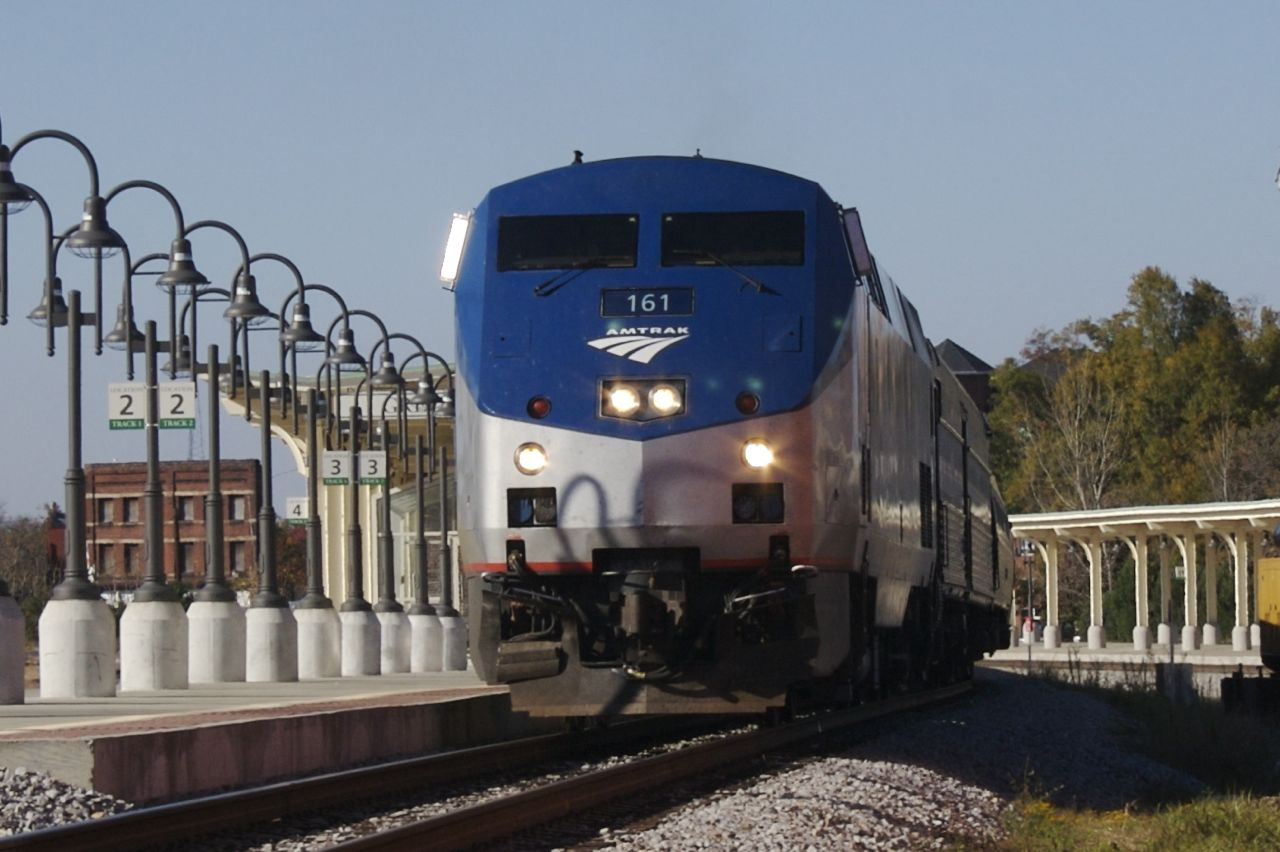
Train 80, the Carolinian, at Greensboro

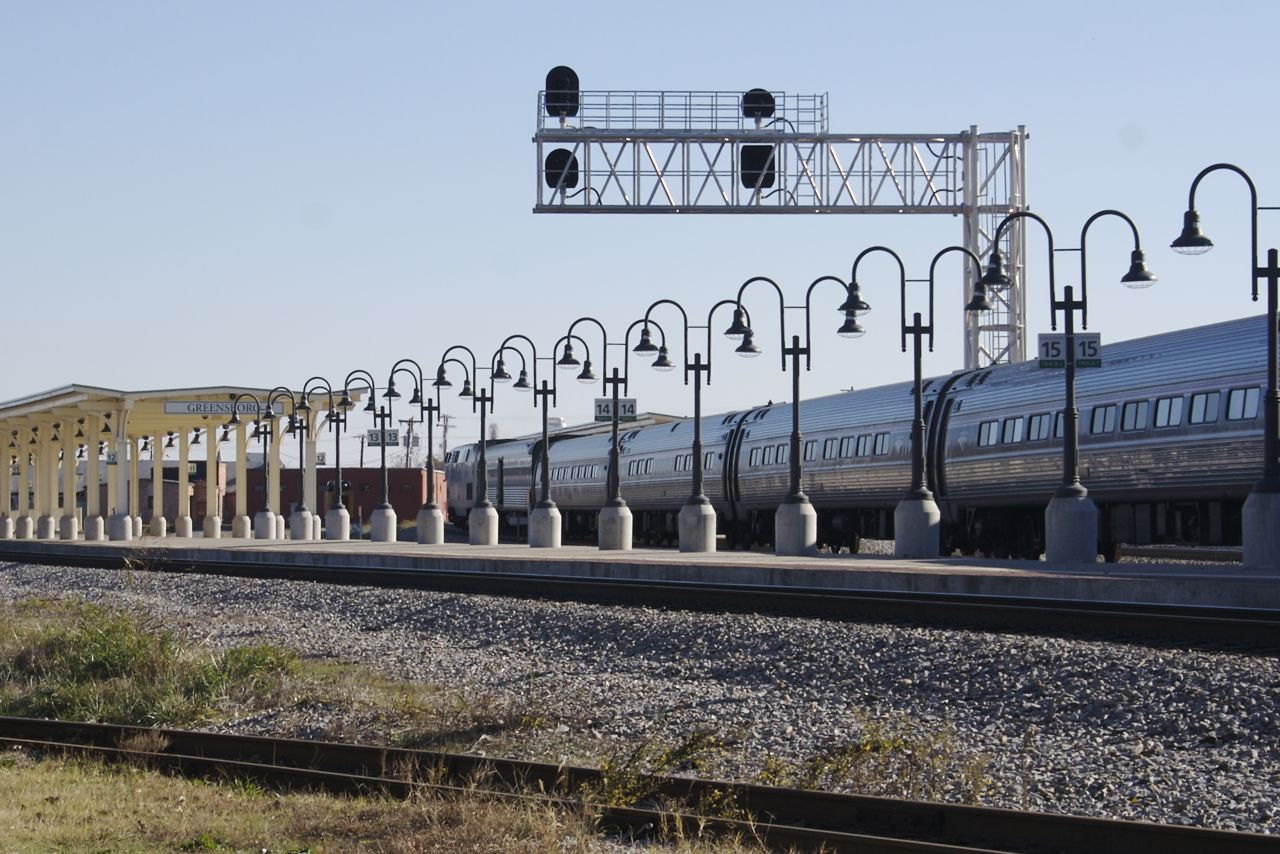
Amtrak train arriving in Greensboro

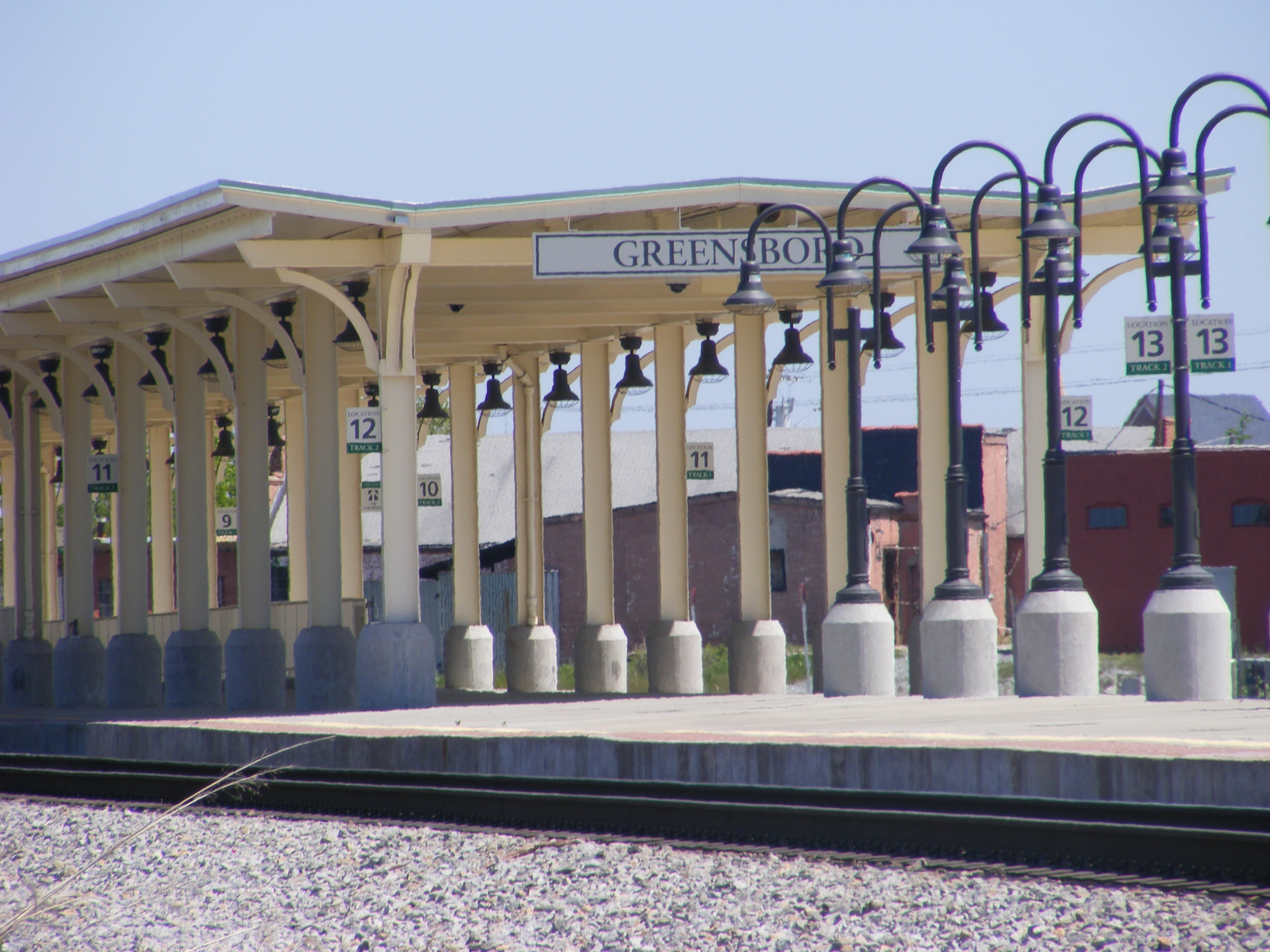
View of the restored platforms

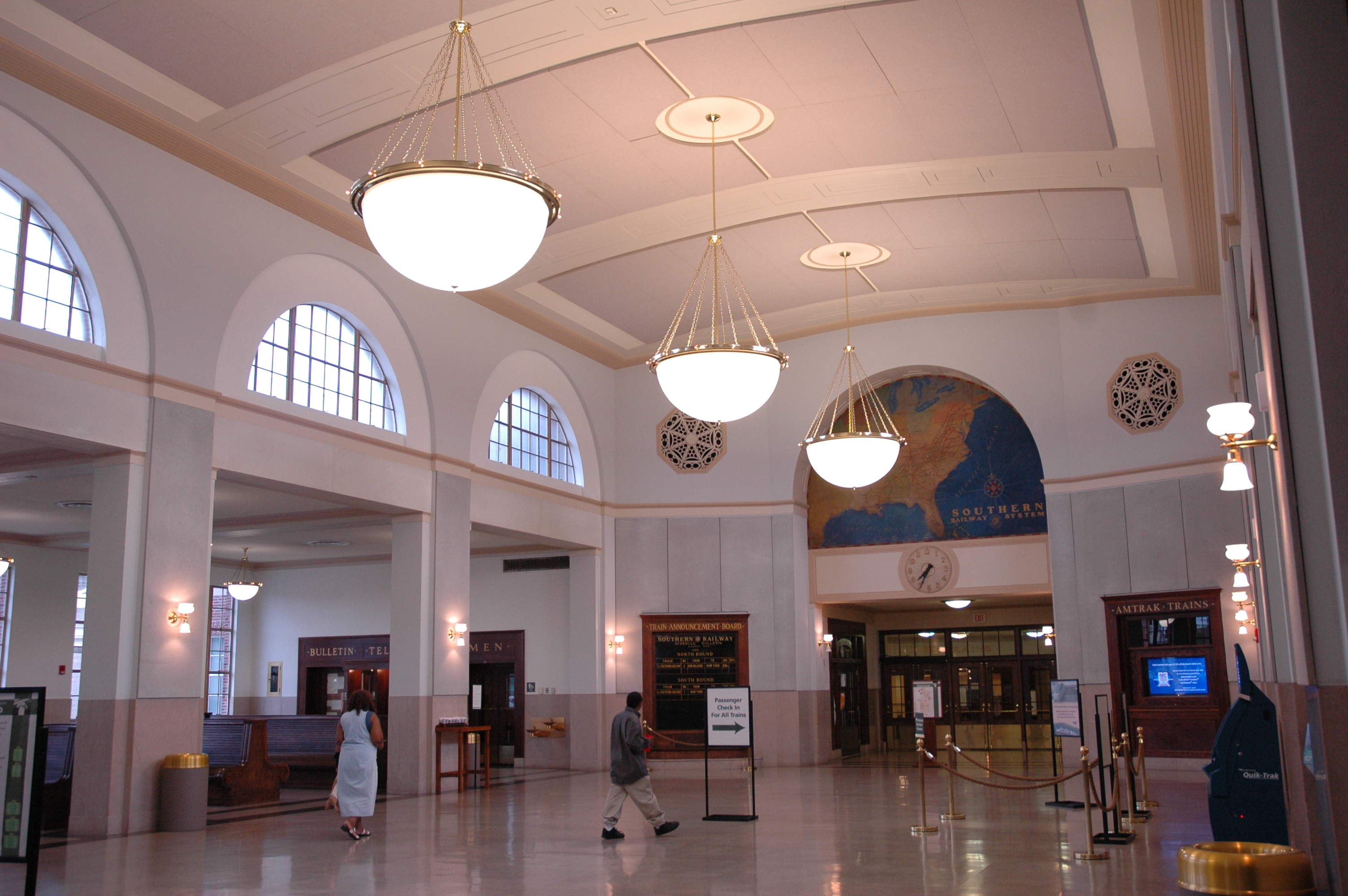
Inside of restored station
