= Hi tran =

Hi tran may refer to:

- High Point Transit System in North Carolina, United States
- HITRAN (High Resolution Transmission), a molecular spectroscopic database
