= Lexington station (North Carolina) =

Lexington, NC
- The Piedmont at Lexington station in 2022

General information
- Location: 29 South Railroad Street; Lexington, North Carolina; United States
- Coordinates: 35°49′13″N 80°15′09″W
- Lines: NCRR Corridor; Danville District
- Tracks: 2

Construction
- Parking: No
- Accessible: No

Other information
- Status: Seasonal; temporary platform only
- Station code: Amtrak: LEX

Services
Preceding station	Amtrak	Following station
Salisbury toward Charlotte	Carolinian	High Point toward New York
Salisbury toward Charlotte	Piedmont	High Point toward Raleigh
Crescent does not stop here
Former services
Preceding station	Southern Railway	Following station
Linwood toward Birmingham	Main Line	Thomasville toward Washington, D.C.
Location

Lexington station is a seasonal Amtrak station located in a former freight house in Lexington, North Carolina, United States. It is served by Amtrak's Carolinian and Piedmont, and is only open for one day during the Lexington Barbecue Festival in October.

A permanent station, which would allow for daily passenger service, was proposed in 2021.

== History ==
Currently, the station operates with a temporary platform near a former Southern Railway freight house, which is now used as the Lexington Farmer's Market. The freight house itself is used for festival activities, and is located along a pair of spur tracks. A third spur track is located between the main tracks and the side along the freight house. Though Amtrak gives the address as being at "Center Street at the railroad tracks," it is actually located around the corner along South Railroad Street. Center Street is located along a bridge over the tracks northeast of the freight house.
