= Salisbury station (North Carolina) =

Railway station in Salisbury, North Carolina

Salisbury, NC
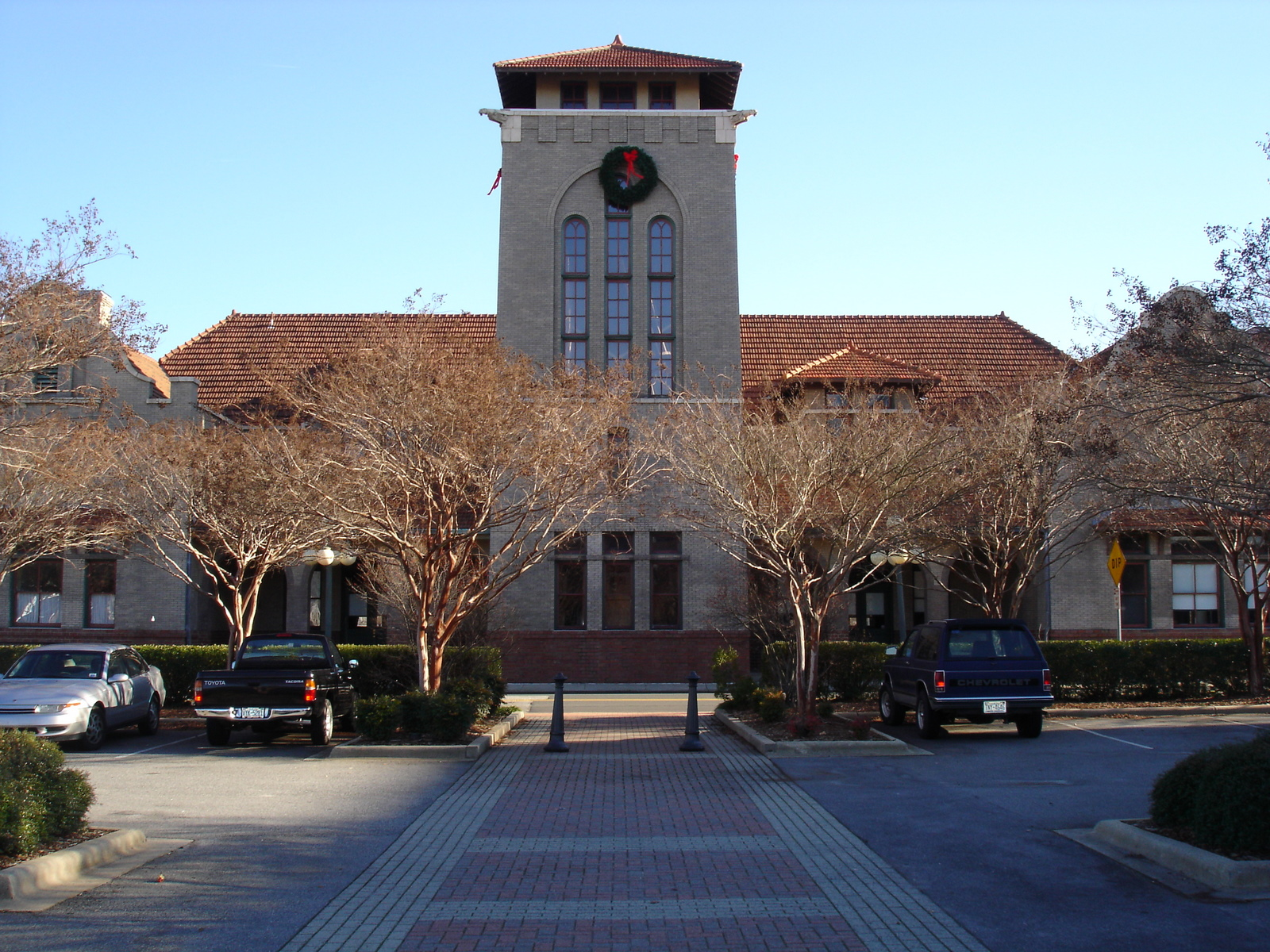
- Entrance to the historic Salisbury Station

General information
- Location: 215 Depot Street; Salisbury, North Carolina; United States
- Coordinates: 35°40′02″N 80°27′58″W
- Owner: Historic Salisbury Foundation
- Lines: NCRR Corridor; Charlotte District
- Platforms: 1 side platform
- Tracks: 1

Construction
- Structure type: At-grade
- Parking: 26 spaces

Other information
- Status: Unstaffed; attendant available
- Station code: Amtrak: SAL

History
- Opened: 1908
- Rebuilt: 1993-1996, 1999
- Original company: Southern Railway

Passengers
- FY 2025: 28,675 (Amtrak)

Services
Preceding station	Amtrak	Following station
Kannapolis toward Charlotte	Carolinian	High Point toward New York
Kannapolis toward Charlotte	Carolinian	Lexington (Seasonal) toward New York
Kannapolis toward Charlotte	Piedmont	High Point toward Raleigh
Kannapolis toward Charlotte	Piedmont	Lexington (Seasonal) toward Raleigh
Charlotte toward New Orleans	Crescent	High Point toward New York
Former services
Preceding station	Southern Railway	Following station
China Grove toward Birmingham	Main Line	Spencer toward Washington, D.C.
Barber toward Morristown	Morristown – Norwood	Rockwell toward Norwood
- Salisbury Southern Railroad Passenger Depot
- U.S. National Register of Historic Places
- U.S. Historic district – Contributing property
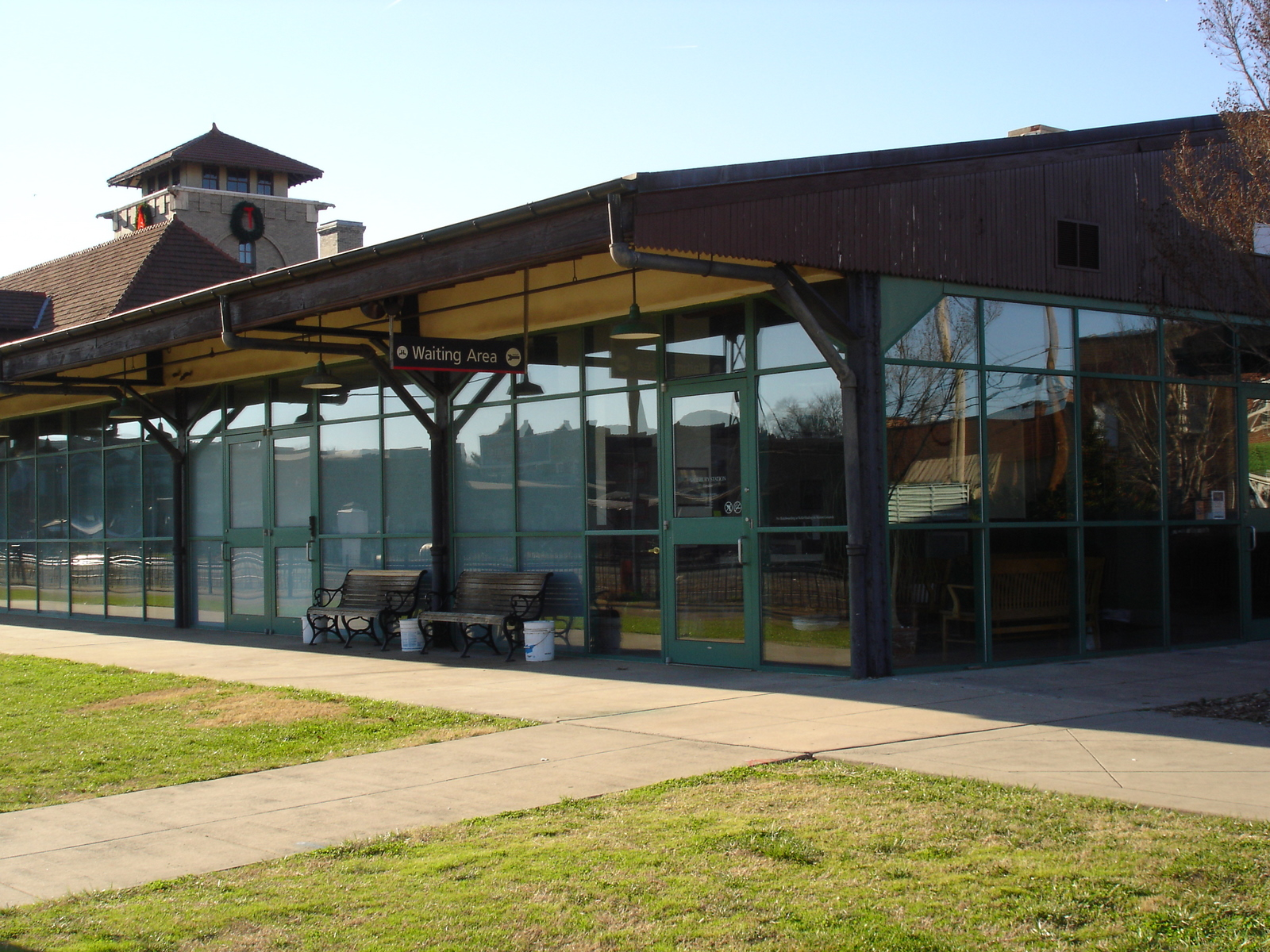
- Waiting area
- Location: E side of Depot St. between Kerr and Council Sts., Salisbury, North Carolina
- Area: 4 acres (1.6 ha)
- Built: 1907
- Architect: Milburn, Frank P.
- Architectural style: Mission/spanish Revival
- NRHP reference No.: 75001290
- Added to NRHP: July 30, 1975
Location

Salisbury station is an Amtrak station located in Salisbury, North Carolina. It is served by three passenger trains: the Crescent, the Carolinian, and the Piedmont. The street address is Depot and Liberty Streets, and is located in the Salisbury Railroad Corridor Historic District.

== History ==
The station was constructed in 1908 by the Southern Railway and was designed by Frank P. Milburn in the Spanish Mission Style. It was added to the National Register of Historic Places in 1975, but was nearly demolished until it was bought by the Historic Salisbury Foundation in 1984. Renovations began in 1993 and were completed by 1996, although NCDOT gave the foundation extra funding in 1999 to enlarge the waiting room.

The Historic Salisbury Foundation sold the depot to the city in 2025.
