= Thomasville station (North Carolina) =

- Thomasville Railroad Passenger Depot
- U.S. National Register of Historic Places
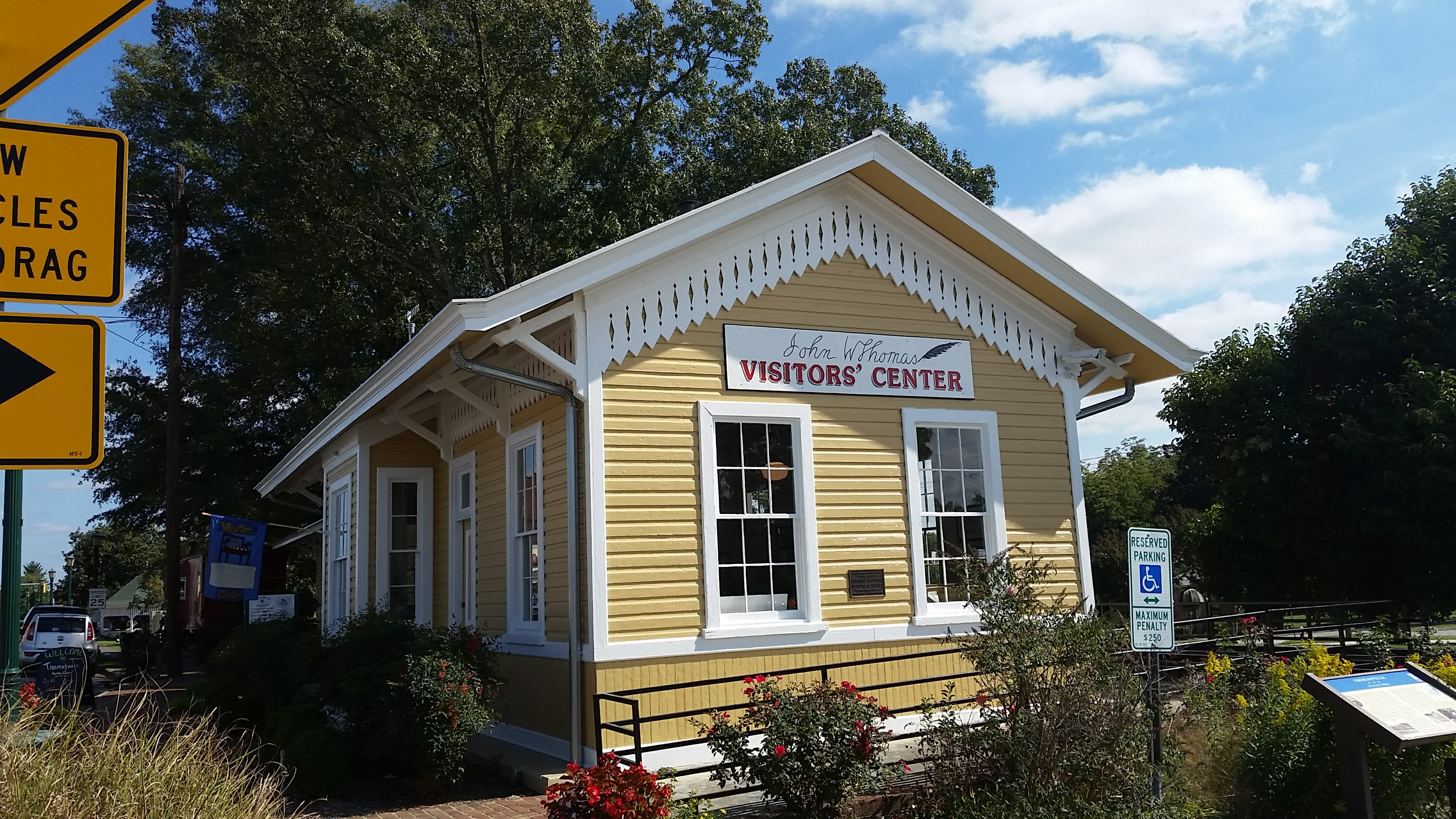
- The Depot as it is now as the city's visitor center.

- Location within North Carolina Location within the United States
- Location: W. Main St., Thomasville, North Carolina
- Coordinates: 35°52′56″N 80°5′2″W
- Area: less than one acre
- Built: 1870-1871
- Architectural style: Victorian
- NRHP reference No.: 81000423
- Added to NRHP: July 9, 1981

The Thomasville Railroad Passenger Depot is a historic train station located at Thomasville, Davidson County, North Carolina. It is one of the oldest remaining frame depots in the state, built between 1870 and 1871. The board-and-batten building features Victorian sawnwork detailing. Until 1912, it served as a passenger train station with the Richmond and Danville Railroad and later the Southern Railway. Due to the increase in passenger rail travel, a new brick depot was built. This depot was then moved to the north side of the tracks and served as a freight agent's office. The Southern Railway eventually gave the structure to the town. The Thomasville Historical Society raised $5,000 for its restoration in 1969. Another restoration was completed in the late 1990s. In July 2000, the Thomasville Railroad Passenger Depot became the home of the Thomasville Visitors' Center.

It was added to the National Register of Historic Places in 1981.

Preceding station	Southern Railway	Following station
Lexington toward Birmingham	Main Line	High Point toward Washington, D.C.
