= Piedmont (train) =

Amtrak train between Raleigh and Charlotte, North Carolina

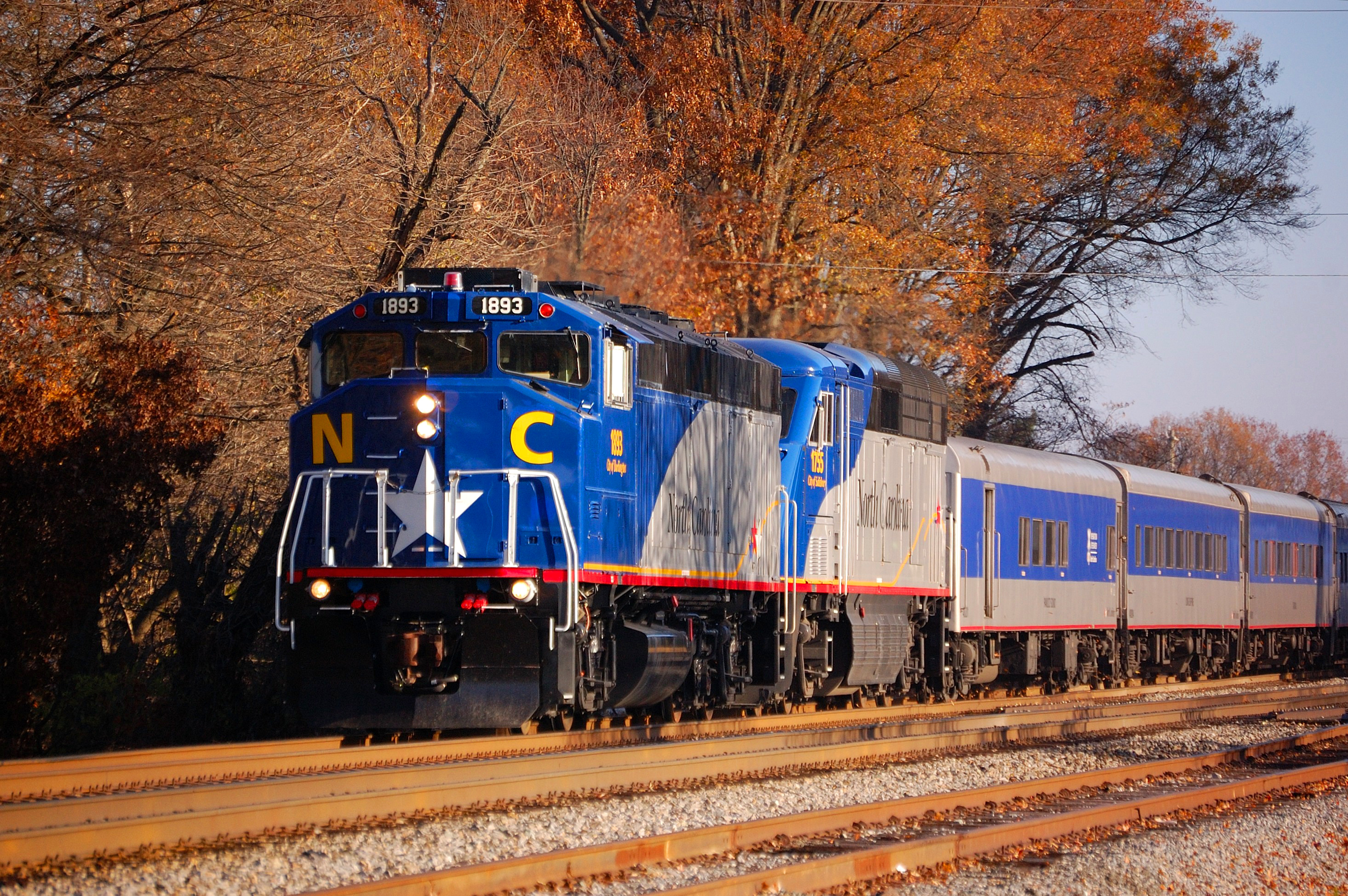
- A state-owned EMD F59PH and EMD F59PHI lead the Piedmont into High Point on an autumn day in 2012.

Overview
- Service type: Inter-city rail
- Locale: North Carolina
- First service: May 26, 1995
- Current operator: Amtrak in partnership with NCDOT
- Annual ridership: 360,655 (FY 24) ▲24.4% (Note: Amtrak's Fiscal Year (FY) runs from October 1 of the prior year to September 30 of the named year.)

Route
- Termini: Raleigh, North Carolina; Charlotte, North Carolina
- Stops: 11
- Distance travelled: 173 miles (278 km)
- Average journey time: 3 hours to 3 hours 20 minutes
- Service frequency: Four round trips daily
- Train number: 71–78

On-board services
- Class: Coach Class
- Disabled access: All stations (except event-only stops)
- Catering facilities: Lounge car
- Baggage facilities: Checked baggage (some stations)

Technical
- Track gauge: 4 ft 8 1/2 in (1,435 mm) standard gauge
- Operating speed: c. 55 mph (89 km/h) (avg.); 79 mph (127 km/h) (top)
- Track owner: NS/NCRR

The Piedmont (also known as the Piedmont Service) is a regional passenger train operated by Amtrak and the North Carolina Department of Transportation (NCDOT), running four round trips daily between Raleigh and Charlotte, North Carolina. It is a sister train to the Carolinian, which runs from Charlotte to New York City. The Piedmont route is coextensive with the southern end of the Carolinian, largely paralleling Interstate 85. It operates along the western portion of the state-owned North Carolina Railroad, which runs from Charlotte to Morehead City. Operations began in May 1995.

NCDOT owns the rolling stock used on the Piedmont, unlike the Carolinian, which uses Amtrak rolling stock. Both trains are marketed by NCDOT under the NC By Train brand.

In fiscal year 2023, Piedmont carried 289,955 passengers, a 36.4% increase from FY2022. This is an increase from pre-COVID-19 pandemic ridership, with 214,218 passengers carried in FY2019.

== History ==
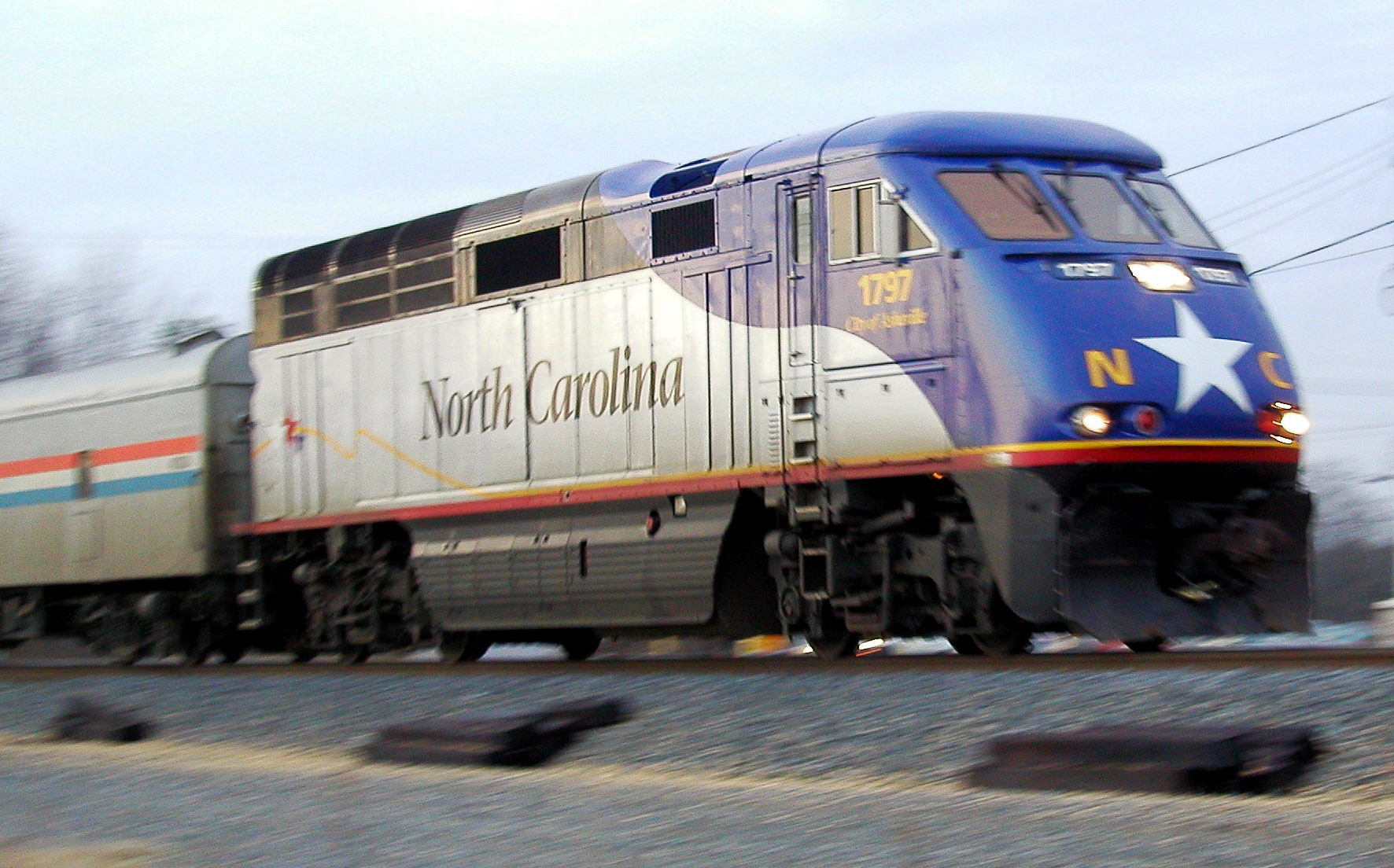
The Piedmont near Charlotte in 2003

North Carolina developed the Piedmont as a regional follow-on to the Carolinian, which had entered service in early 1990. With the growing popularity of the Carolinian, state officials sought to add a second daily round-trip between Charlotte and Raleigh. However, Amtrak initially balked, claiming that it didn't have enough rolling stock to spare. Undaunted, in the fall of 1990, NCDOT approved the acquisition of five used passenger cars and the leasing of two diesel locomotives. The board planned to have the second train enter service by early 1992.

The Piedmont (as the train came to be called) faced numerous delays. Since the Charlotte station was not designed to turn equipment, Norfolk Southern, which operates the NCRR under a longstanding lease with the state, insisted that the state construct a wye in Charlotte for turning the two trains around. At the time, the southbound Carolinian had deadheaded 10 miles (16 km) south to the nearest wye in Pineville and turned around there. In 1993, the cost of the wye plus land purchase was estimated at $200,000; by late 1994, this grew to $695,000, plus $1.5 million for a maintenance facility in Raleigh. The Piedmont finally began operating on May 26, 1995. Originally, it operated with an early-morning trip to Charlotte and a nighttime return to Raleigh. Its creation enabled same-day business travel between Charlotte and Raleigh in both directions.

After delays in refurbishing the motive power and passenger cars, an additional Piedmont round trip began operating on June 5, 2010. With the addition of the second train, Amtrak rebranded the route Piedmont Service to reflect the multiple daily frequencies.

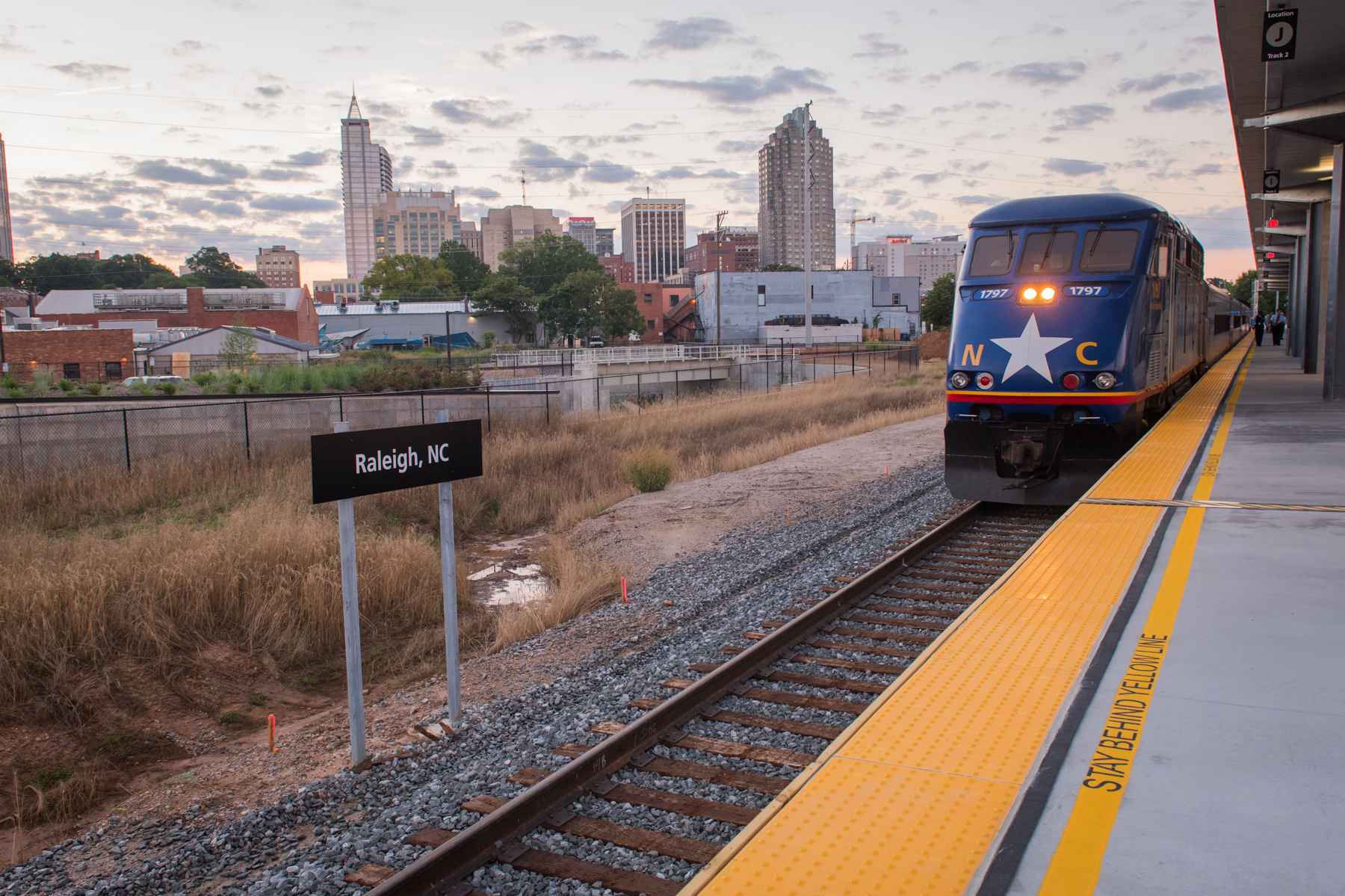
The first Piedmont at Raleigh Union Station in 2018

On March 22, 2011, it was announced that an agreement between NCDOT, Amtrak, Norfolk Southern and the North Carolina Railroad had been reached that would allow for $461 million in grants from the federal government to be used in upgrading infrastructure. The money would be used to add additional double track and passing sidings, as well as reducing curves, resulting in a 13-minute reduction in travel time. The improvements also would support a possible increase in maximum speed to 90 miles per hour (145 km/h) from the existing 79 mph (127 km/h). The speed increase would be implemented after the installation of positive train control safety technology, and it would reduce travel time by another 12 to 15 minutes.

Improvements include the new Raleigh Union Station, which had its "ribbon cutting" in late April 2018 and began accepting trains that July. A third daily Piedmont round trip was added on June 4, 2018.

On April 6, 2020, the Piedmont was truncated to a single round trip due to the COVID-19 pandemic. On May 18, 2020, the Piedmont was suspended in a further round of COVID-related service cutbacks. This left the Carolinian, which returned that day after a month-long suspension, as the only rail link between Charlotte and Raleigh. The Piedmont returned on August 10, with a single round trip. A second round trip was restored in December. On April 5, 2021, the Piedmont resumed its full schedule of three round trips. This was part of a planned larger restoration of service across the Amtrak system in the spring and summer of 2021. A fourth round trip was added on July 10, 2023.

On May 27, 2021, Amtrak released a long-range planning document for improved service in the Southeast Region that proposed additional Piedmont frequencies between Charlotte and Raleigh, as well as a potential expansion of two round trips south to Atlanta, Georgia along the route of the Crescent. If implemented, an additional round trip along this corridor would operate only between Charlotte and Atlanta. Expanding the Piedmont route to Atlanta would create the first daylight service south of Charlotte since the Southern Railway's Piedmont Limited was truncated from Atlanta to Charlotte in 1975.

After the federal government awarded the NCDOT a $1.1 billion dollar grant in December 2023, NCDOT said that the Piedmont route would be extended from Raleigh to Wake Forest, North Carolina. NCDOT targeted 2030 for the completion of infrastructure improvements to support this plan.

== Route details ==
Map of the Piedmont route

The Piedmont operates over North Carolina Railroad trackage. Norfolk Southern Railway and its predecessors have leased the NCRR from the state since 1871.

- Charlotte District, Charlotte to Linwood
- Danville District, Linwood to Greensboro
- Raleigh District, Greensboro to Raleigh

PART operates Amtrak Thruway service between High Point station and Winston-Salem, branded as NC Amtrak Connector.

The NCDOT offers free transit passes which allow detraining Piedmont passengers to get one free bus ride and one transfer on the same day of travel. Passes are honored by 13 participating transit systems along its route.

While the Piedmont is operated by Amtrak crews, most other operations are handled by NCDOT. The state sets schedules, owns the equipment, and handles most of the marketing. Maintenance is handled by state contractors at facilities in Charlotte and Raleigh.

== Rolling stock ==
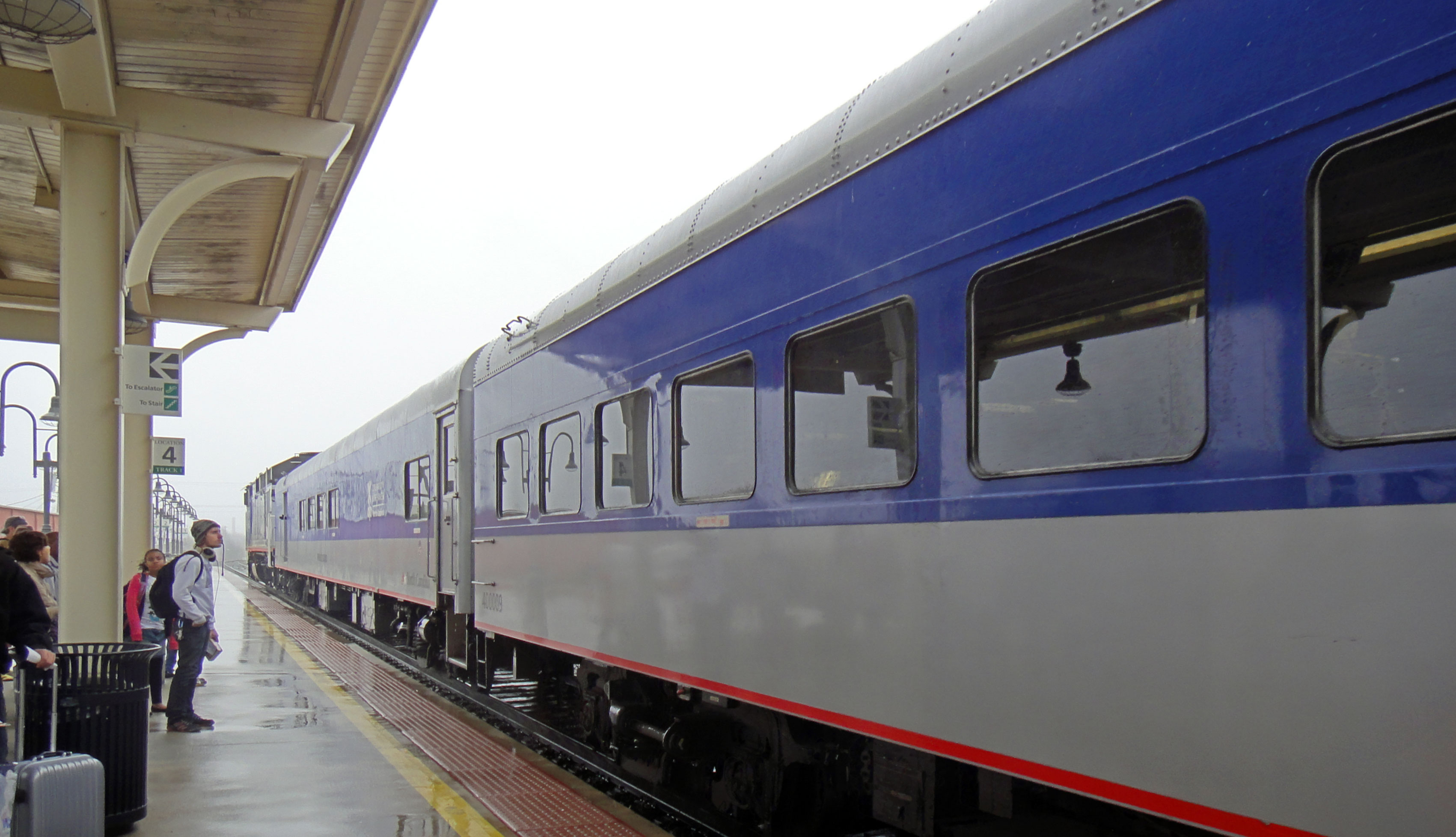
State-owned coaches on the Piedmont.

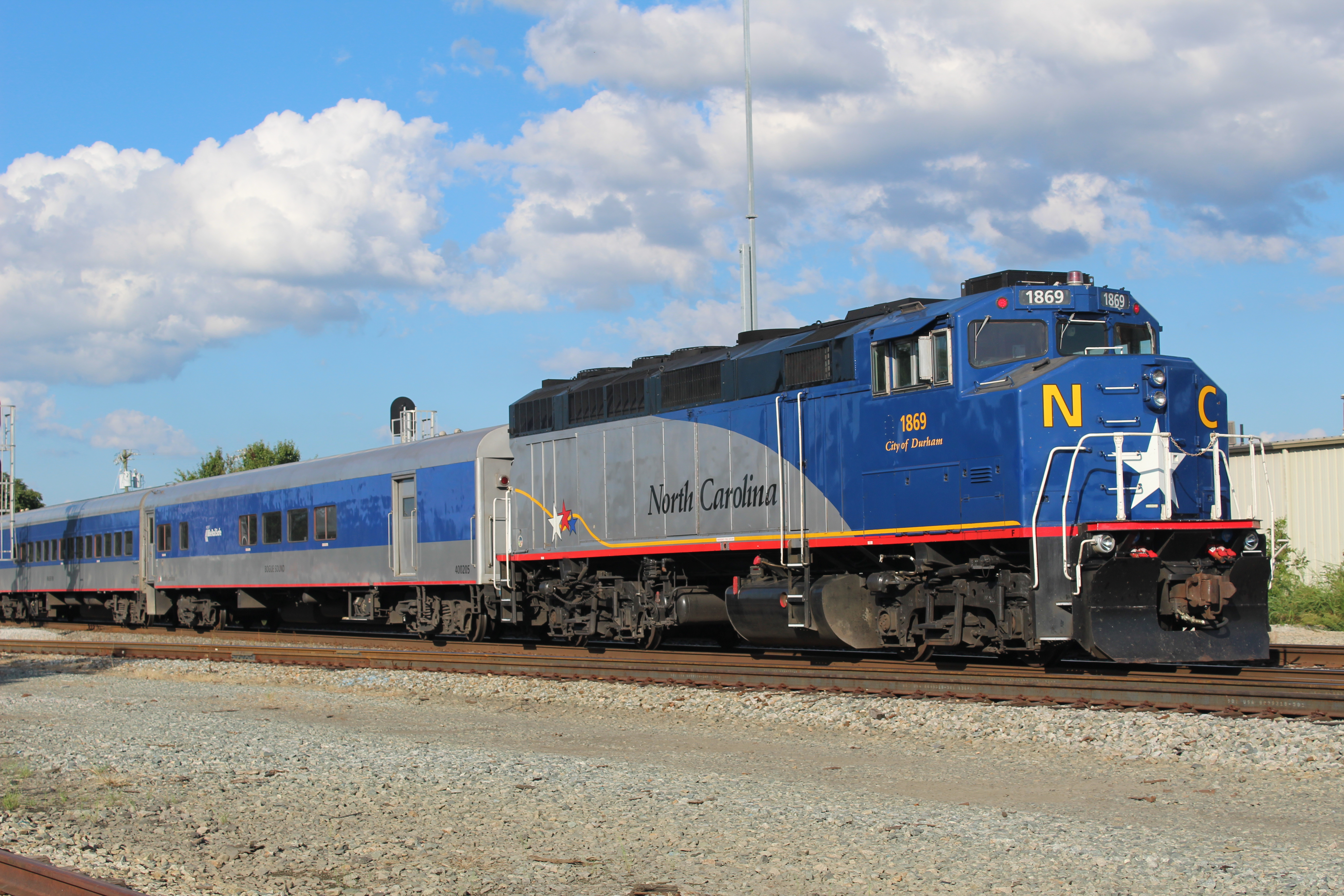
NCDT F59PH engine City of Durham at Salisbury.

The motive power for the Piedmont has been provided by eight state-owned locomotives. Two are EMD F59PHIs, numbered 1755 (City of Salisbury) and 1797 (City of Asheville). Six are EMD F59PHs, numbered 1810 (City of Greensboro), 1859 (City of High Point), 1869 (City of Durham), 1871 (Town of Cary), 1893 (City of Burlington), and 1984 (City of Kannapolis). NCDOT also has five cab control units which are numbered 101-105. NCDOT's current F59PHs were originally used by GO Transit of Toronto, Ontario, Canada, and rebuilt by American Motive Power and Altoona Works.

NCDOT formerly operated two GP40PH-2's rebuilt by AMF. 1768 (City of Charlotte), originally B&O GP40 4008, was sold to the Virginia Railway Express and became VRE V24. 1792 (City of Raleigh), originally L&N GP40 3006, was wrecked in the Mebane accident. Everything except the EMD 645 engine, bell and horn were scrapped.

Since at least 2017, the Piedmont has operated with two locomotives, one on each end of the train, to improve on-time performance. With the addition of the cab control units, the Piedmont also operates in push-pull mode with a single locomotive.

State-owned passenger cars on the Piedmont are refurbished coach cars originally built by Pullman-Standard and the St. Louis Car Company in the 1960s for the Kansas City Southern and Union Pacific. There are five lounge/baggage cars and one coach/baggage car originally built by the St. Louis Car Company in the 1950s and used by the United States Army. The lounge car includes vending machines and complimentary coffee and tea. There are 14 regular coaches used on trains in addition to the 5 lounge/baggage cars. Each regular coach is named after a state landmark or state symbol, including "Box Turtle", "Cardinal", "Carolina Lily", "Channel Bass", "Dogwood", "Emerald", "Fraser Fir", "Granite", "Gray Squirrel", "Honey Bee", "Long Leaf Pine", "Plott Hound", "Scotch Bonnet", and "Sweet Potato". Each lounge/baggage car is named after an estuary located in the state, including "Albemarle Sound", "Bogue Sound", "Core Sound", "Currituck Sound", and "Pamlico Sound". Finally, the coach/baggage car, named "Yadkin River", had seen service before it was donated to the North Carolina Transportation Museum. During the COVID-related service cutbacks of 2020, NCDOT opted to run the Carolinian rather than the Piedmont to save the expense of maintaining the state-owned consists, since the Carolinian uses Amtrak rolling stock.

All rolling stock has been painted in a blue and silver livery, with red accents, based on the North Carolina state flag. The Carolinian uses Amtrak's national red-white-blue livery.

In August 2019, the Federal Railroad Administration awarded NCDOT up to $76.9 million to purchase 13 new coaches, allowing the replacement of some older cars and an expansion to four daily round trips. On May 22, 2020, Senator Thom Tillis announced that NCDOT will receive an $80 million dollar grant to order 13 additional new railcars (for an overall total of 26 new railcars) and 6 new locomotives to replace the remainder of the current fleet.

By February 2020, nine former circus train cars purchased by NCDOT for $383,000 in 2017 for restoration and use on the Piedmont were stored in Spring Hope, North Carolina. The state listed the nine cars for sale in December 2020. The cars were not sold; they were damaged by fire on March 10, 2022. The five surviving cars were again listed for sale in April 2022.

In October 2024, NCDOT was awarded federal and matching grants for the purchase of 26 new cars of rolling stock and 6 new engines. The new trains and corresponding maintenance facility are expected to begin construction in 2026.

In January 2025, NCDOT was awarded a $14 million federal grant for adding cafe car service to Piedmont trains.

== Stations ==
Municipality	Station	Connections
Raleigh	Raleigh	Amtrak: Carolinian, Floridian; GoRaleigh
Raleigh	North Carolina State Fair	Only served during North Carolina State Fair; Amtrak: Carolinian
Cary	Cary	Amtrak: Carolinian, Floridian; GoCary, GoTriangle
Durham	Durham	Amtrak: Carolinian; GoDurham, GoTriangle, Greyhound, Megabus
Burlington	Burlington	Amtrak: Carolinian; Elon BioBus
Greensboro	Greensboro	Amtrak: Carolinian, Crescent; Greyhound, GTA, PART
High Point	High Point	Amtrak: Carolinian, Crescent; Amtrak Thruway, Hi tran, PART
Lexington	Lexington	Only served during Lexington Barbecue Festival; full-time station planned. Amtrak: Carolinian
Salisbury	Salisbury	Amtrak: Carolinian, Crescent; Rowan Transit, Salisbury Transit
Kannapolis	Kannapolis	Amtrak: Carolinian; CK Rider, Rowan Transit
Charlotte	Charlotte	Amtrak: Carolinian, Crescent; CATS
