= Carolinian (train) =

Amtrak service between New York, NY and Charlotte, NC

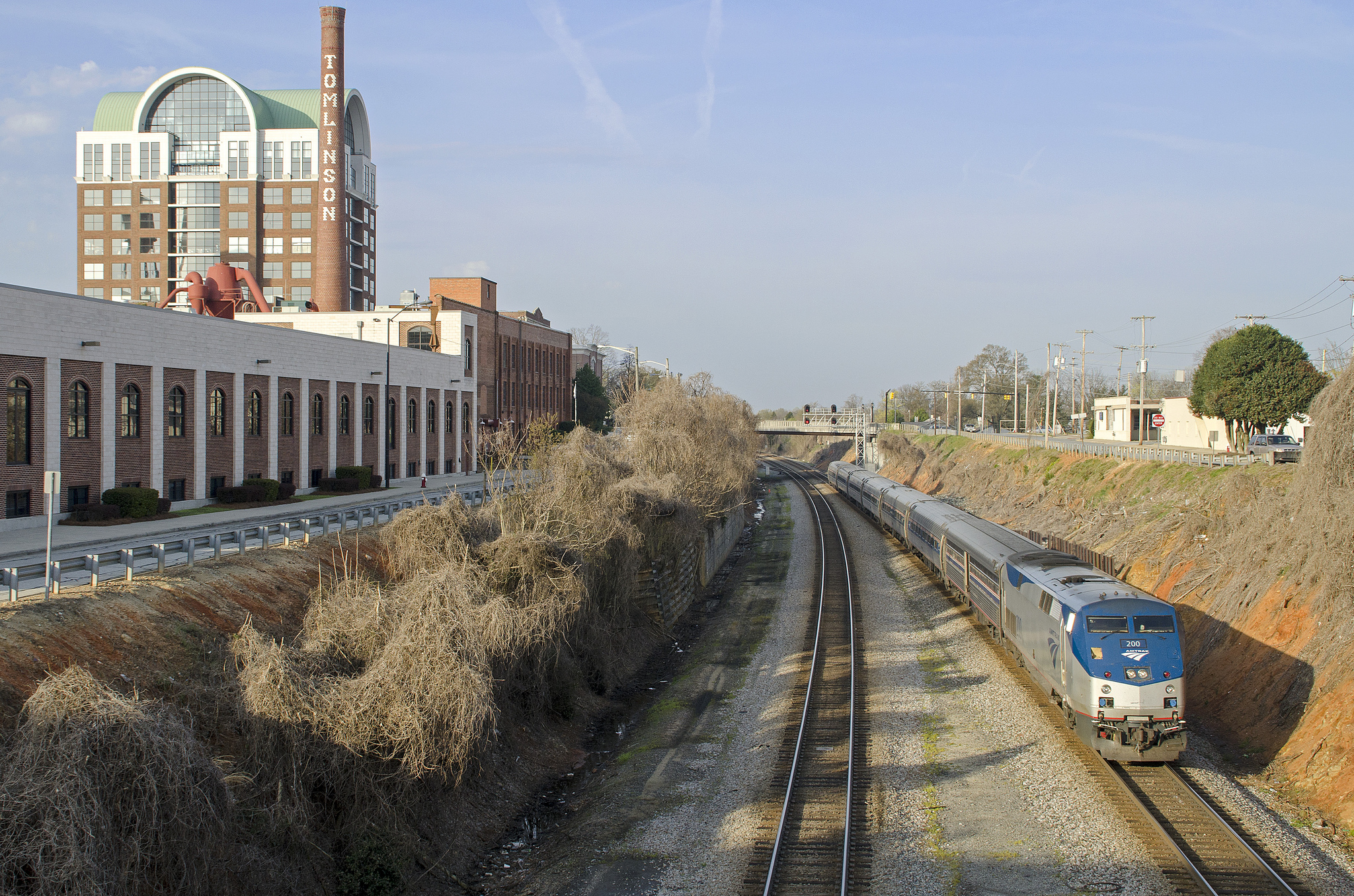
- Northbound Carolinian pulling in to High Point in 2013

Overview
- Service type: Inter-city rail
- Locale: Northeastern and Southern United States
- First service: May 12, 1990
- Current operator: Amtrak in partnership with NCDOT
- Annual ridership: 347,360 (FY 24) ▲10% (Note: Amtrak's Fiscal Year (FY) runs from October 1 of the prior year to September 30 of the named year.)

Route
- Termini: New York City; Charlotte, North Carolina
- Stops: 24
- Distance travelled: 704 miles (1,133 km)
- Average journey time: 13 hours, 31 minutes (northbound); 13 hours, 50 minutes (southbound)
- Service frequency: Daily
- Train number: 79, 80

On-board services
- Classes: Coach Class; Business Class
- Disabled access: All cars, most stations
- Catering facilities: Café car
- Baggage facilities: Overhead racks, checked baggage available at selected stations

Technical
- Rolling stock: Amfleet cars
- Track gauge: 4 ft 8 1/2 in (1,435 mm) standard gauge
- Electrification: Overhead line, 12 kV AC at 25 Hz (New York–Washington)
- Operating speed: 52 mph (84 km/h) (avg.); 125 mph (201 km/h) (top)
- Track owners: Amtrak, CSX, NS/NCRR

The Carolinian is a daily Amtrak passenger train that runs between New York City and Charlotte, North Carolina, with major stops in Philadelphia, Baltimore, Washington, Richmond, Raleigh, Cary, Durham, and Greensboro. The 704-mile (1,133 km) service is the longest state-supported route in the Amtrak system. Northbound trains leave Charlotte in the early morning and arrive in New York in the early evening, while southbound trains leave New York during the morning rush and arrive in Charlotte in the evening.

The Carolinian began operation in 1990 and is jointly funded and operated by Amtrak and the North Carolina Department of Transportation (NCDOT). Additional corridor service between Charlotte and Raleigh is provided by the Piedmont. The two trains are marketed by NCDOT under the NC By Train brand.

The train operates over the Northeast Corridor between New York and Washington, D.C. The North Carolina portion of the route runs along the North Carolina Railroad, a state-owned railroad which is leased to Norfolk Southern.

== History ==
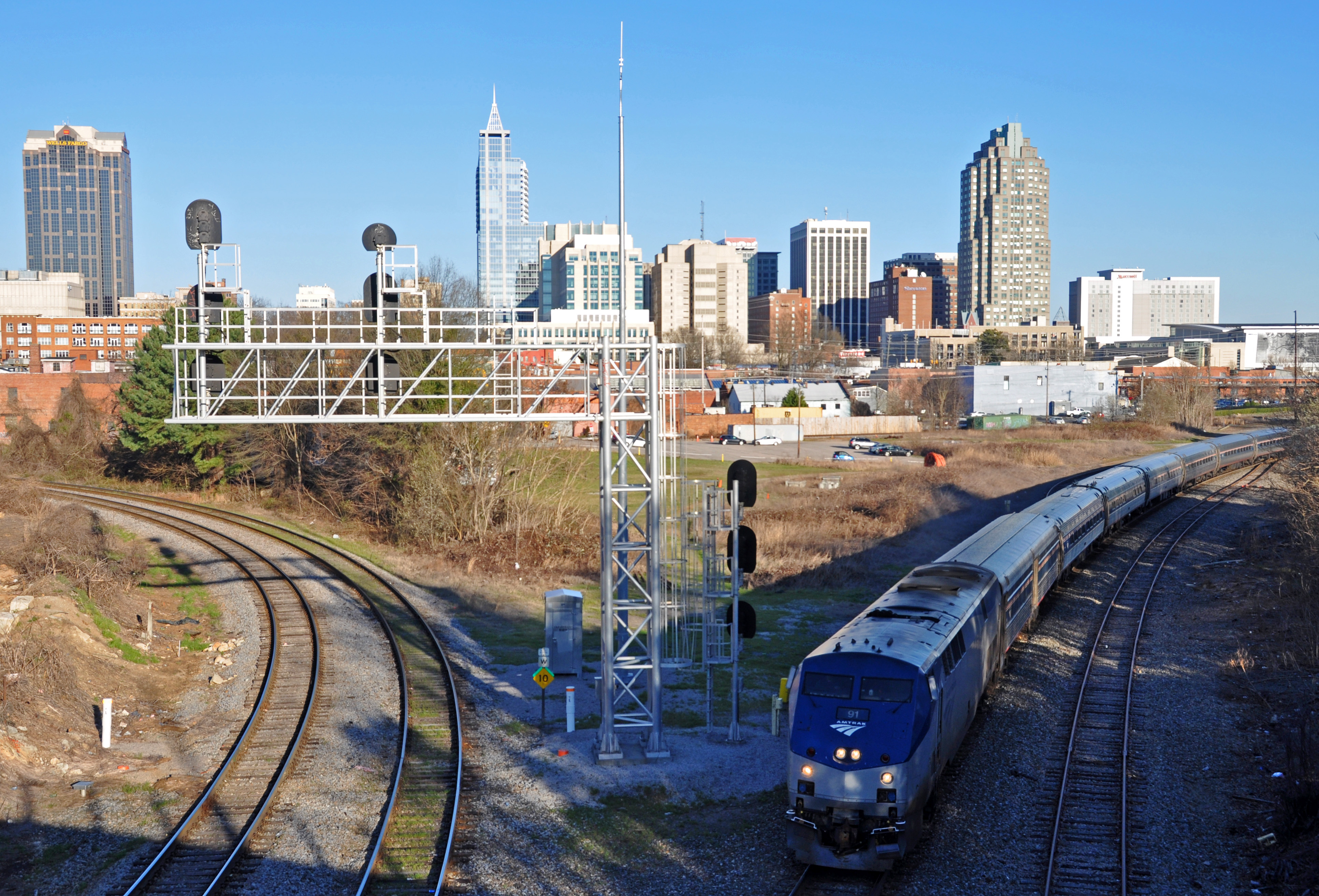
The Carolinian departing the old Raleigh Amtrak station in 2014; a new station was built and opened in 2018

For most of Amtrak's first two decades, service in North Carolina was limited to long-distance trains, which were not well-suited to regional travel. The Piedmont from Greensboro to Charlotte continued to be served by Southern Railway for much of the 1970s; Southern had been one of the few large railroads to opt out of Amtrak in 1971. However, Southern drastically reduced its remaining service in 1976, including its remaining medium-haul trains going through the state, before handing its remaining service to Amtrak in 1979.

=== First iteration ===
Amtrak first introduced the Carolinian on October 28, 1984, in partnership with the state of North Carolina. It was originally a section of the Palmetto, which ran between New York and Savannah, Georgia. It ran from Charlotte to Raleigh, where it stopped at the old Seaboard Air Line Railroad station. From there, it ran to Henderson to Collier Yard south of Petersburg, Virginia. At Richmond, Virginia, the Carolinian joined the Palmetto for the journey to New York along the Northeast Corridor. The southbound train operated in the reverse direction, splitting from the Palmetto in Richmond while the Palmetto continued to Savannah. North Carolina supported the Carolinian with a $436,000 yearly subsidy from Charlotte to the Virginia line. It was the first direct Raleigh—Charlotte service in 30 years and the first North Carolina-specific service in 20 years. An early alternative name for the service was the Piedmont Palmetto.

Amtrak intended the Carolinian to be a one-year pilot project, and was very open to making the route permanent. However, while ridership exceeded expectations, revenues did not: most passengers traveled within North Carolina and did not continue to the Northeast. Amtrak was also hampered by the proliferation of cheap airfares from Charlotte and Raleigh to the Northeast. Amid losses of $800,000, Amtrak discontinued the Carolinian on September 3, 1985, after North Carolina declined to increase its subsidy. Supporters of the Carolinian blamed Amtrak and the state for not marketing the train properly; many passengers were unaware that the train went all the way to New York.

=== Second iteration ===
Amtrak and North Carolina re-launched the Carolinian on May 12, 1990. Like the original, it was originally a section of the Palmetto, only this time the split occurred in Rocky Mount, North Carolina. This incarnation proved successful enough that in April 1991, Amtrak made the Carolinian a full-fledged day train running from Charlotte to New York. While the Palmetto runs through from Richmond to Alexandria, Virginia; the Carolinian stops at Fredericksburg and Quantico (shared with Northeast Regional trains going to Newport News or Norfolk) before continuing on to Alexandria.

In 1995, the Carolinian was joined with a sister regional train, the Piedmont, which runs along the I-85 Corridor between Raleigh and Charlotte–the southern leg of the Carolinian. The Piedmont was originally due to enter service in 1993, but was delayed when Norfolk Southern insisted that Amtrak build a new wye in Charlotte to turn the Carolinian and Piedmont around. Previously, the southbound Carolinian had to make a time-consuming 10-mile deadhead trip to the nearest wye in Pineville, North Carolina.

In 2004, the Carolinian began bypassing BWI Rail Station.

On March 9, 2015, a northbound Carolinian collided with a tractor-trailer that was stuck on the tracks in Halifax County, North Carolina. The locomotive landed on its side, while all of the cars remained upright. There were no fatalities, but 55 people were injured.

In April 2020, NCDOT and Amtrak suspended the Carolinian as part of a larger round of service reductions in response to the COVID-19 pandemic. The Carolinian returned on May 18 as a truncated service between Charlotte and Raleigh. Full service to New York was restored on June 1, 2020.

=== Proposed expansion ===
In 2017, NCDOT and the Connecticut Department of Transportation were in talks to extend the Carolinian from New York to New Haven, with additional stops at New Rochelle, Stamford, and Bridgeport. The resultant route would be 779 miles (1,254 km) long. By increasing the length of the route to over 750 miles (1,210 km), the Carolinian would become a long-distance network route rather than state-supported, as defined by the Passenger Rail Investment and Improvement Act of 2008. In effect, this would allow the train to be fully subsidized by the federal government and thus free North Carolina of its state funding obligations.

Long-term plans call for restoring a portion of the former Seaboard main line between Raleigh and Richmond, known as the "S-Line," as part of construction of the Southeast High Speed Rail Corridor between Charlotte and Washington. The S-Line had been abandoned in 1985, forcing Amtrak to route its trains linking Raleigh and the Northeast through Selma along the NCRR. It is estimated that restoring the S-Line will cut an hour off the Carolinian's running time by enabling a more direct route over the Virginia border.

== Operation ==
=== Equipment ===
A typical Carolinian consists of a locomotive, a Viewliner baggage car, an Amfleet Business Class coach, Amfleet café car, and four Amfleet coaches.

Between Charlotte and Washington, trains are pulled by a GE Genesis or Siemens Charger diesel locomotive at speeds up to 79 miles per hour (127 km/h). Between Washington and New York, the service operates over the Northeast Corridor which has overhead electric lines and trains are pulled by Siemens ACS-64 electric locomotives at speeds up to 125 miles per hour (201 km/h).

By 2031, the train's existing equipment is expected to be replaced by Amtrak Airo trainsets, Amtrak's branding for trainsets combining Siemens Venture passenger cars with a Siemens Charger diesel-electric locomotive. The Carolinian trainsets will include six passenger cars with a food service area and a mix of 2×2 Coach Class and 1×2 Business Class seating. The car nearest the locomotive will be an "Auxiliary Power Vehicle" (APV) equipped with a pantograph to draw power from overhead lines and supply electricity to four electric traction motors in the APV and four in the locomotive. The design is intended to allow near-seamless transitions between diesel and electric operation, eliminating the need for a time-consuming locomotive change in Washington.

=== Classes of service ===
All classes of service include complimentary WiFi, an electric outlet (120 V, 60 Hz AC) at each seat, reading lamps, fold-out tray tables. Reservations are required on all trains, tickets may be purchased online, from an agent at some stations, a ticketing machine at most stations, or, at a higher cost, from the conductor on the train.

- Coach Class: 2×2 seating. Passengers self-select seats on a first-come, first-served basis.
- Business Class: 2×2 seating with more legroom than coach. Passengers receive complimentary soft drinks. Seats assigned in advance.

=== Route ===
The Carolinian operates over Amtrak, CSX Transportation, Norfolk Southern Railway, and North Carolina Railroad trackage. Since 1871, Norfolk Southern and its predecessors have leased the NCRR from the state.

- Amtrak Northeast Corridor, New York to Washington
- CSX RF&P Subdivision, Richmond Terminal Subdivision, North End Subdivision, and South End Subdivision, Washington to Selma
- NS Raleigh District, Selma to Greensboro (leased from NCRR)
- NS Danville District, Greensboro to Linwood (leased from NCRR)
- NS Charlotte District, Linwood to Charlotte (leased from NCRR)

Two Amtrak Thruway bus routes connect large swaths of eastern North Carolina to the Wilson station. One route serves Greenville, New Bern, Havelock, and Morehead City; another serves Goldsboro, Kinston, Jacksonville, and Wilmington. A third Thruway route connects Winston-Salem to the High Point station.

=== Funding ===
The North Carolina Department of Transportation provides funding to operate the Carolinian from Charlotte to the Virginia border. NCDOT offers free transit passes which allow detraining Carolinian passengers in North Carolina to get one free bus ride and one transfer on the same day of travel. Passes are honored by 13 participating transit systems along its route.

=== Ridership and revenue ===
Ridership in 2013 was over 317,550 passengers. It was then followed by a period of steadily decreasing passengers through the COVID-19 pandemic, where it saw 150,365 riders in 2020. In fiscal year 2022 the Carolinian saw a 38.7% increase from 2021, surpassing 2018 and 2019 levels with 270,050 passengers. The Carolinian's ridership increased by 16.9% in fiscal year 2023, to 315,781, nearly matching its previous ridership record of 317,550 in 2013. In fiscal year 2024 the Carolinian saw record ridership with 347,360 passengers boarding. Additionally in FY 2024, the Carolinian had operating revenue of $21.7 million

=== Station stops ===
The train has two seasonal stops in October. A station in Lexington is used during the Lexington Barbecue Festival, while an additional station in Raleigh is used for the North Carolina State Fair.

Before 2019, the northbound Carolinian followed the practice of most medium- and long-distance trains operating in the Northeast and did not allow passengers to travel only between stations on the Northeast Corridor. It only stopped to discharge passengers from Washington northward in order to keep seats available for passengers making longer trips. Starting in 2019, the northbound Carolinian began allowing local travel on the Northeast Corridor on Sundays, Thursdays and Fridays. The southbound Carolinian allows local travel in the Northeast at all times from Trenton southward.

State	Town/City	Station	Connections
New York	New York City	New York; Penn Station	Amtrak (long-distance): Cardinal, Crescent, Lake Shore Limited, Palmetto, Silver Meteor; Amtrak (intercity): Acela, Adirondack, Berkshire Flyer, Empire Service, Ethan Allen Express, Keystone Service, Maple Leaf, Northeast Regional, Pennsylvanian, Vermonter; LIRR: ■ City Terminal Zone, ■ Port Washington Branch; NJ Transit: ■ North Jersey Coast Line, ■ Northeast Corridor Line, ■ Gladstone Branch, ■ Montclair–Boonton Line, ■ Morristown Line; NYC Subway: PATH: HOB-33 JSQ-33 JSQ-33 (via HOB); NYC Transit Bus
New Jersey	Newark	Newark; Penn Station	Amtrak: Acela, Cardinal, Crescent, Keystone Service, Northeast Regional, Pennsylvanian, Silver Meteor, Vermonter; NJ Transit: ■ North Jersey Coast Line, ■ Northeast Corridor Line, ■ Raritan Valley Line; PATH: NWK-WTC; Newark Light Rail; NJ Transit Bus
New Jersey	Trenton	Trenton	Amtrak: Cardinal, Crescent, Keystone Service, Northeast Regional, Pennsylvanian, Silver Meteor, Vermonter; NJ Transit: ■ Northeast Corridor Line, ■ River Line; SEPTA Regional Rail: ■ Trenton Line; NJ Transit Bus, SEPTA Suburban Bus
Pennsylvania	Philadelphia	30th Street Station	Amtrak: Acela, Cardinal, Crescent, Keystone Service, Northeast Regional, Palmetto, Pennsylvanian, Silver Meteor, Vermonter; SEPTA Regional Rail: all routes NJ Transit: ■ Atlantic City Line; SEPTA Metro: SEPTA City Bus, SEPTA Suburban Bus
Delaware	Wilmington	Wilmington	Amtrak: Acela, Cardinal, Crescent, Palmetto, Northeast Regional, Silver Meteor, Vermonter; SEPTA Regional Rail: ■ Wilmington/Newark Line; DART First State; Greyhound Lines
Maryland	Baltimore	Baltimore	Amtrak: Acela, Cardinal, Crescent, Palmetto, Northeast Regional, Silver Meteor, Vermonter; MARC: ■ Penn Line; Light RailLink; MTA Maryland, Charm City Circulator
District of Columbia	Washington	Washington; Union Station	Amtrak: Acela, Cardinal, Crescent, Floridian, Palmetto, Northeast Regional, Silver Meteor, Vermonter; MARC: ■ Brunswick Line, ■ Camden Line, ■ Penn Line; VRE: ■ Manassas Line, ■ Fredericksburg Line; Washington Metro: Red Line; Metrobus, MTA Maryland, Loudoun County Transit, OmniRide; Intercity bus: Greyhound, Megabus, BestBus, Peter Pan, OurBus
Virginia	Alexandria	Alexandria	Amtrak: Cardinal, Crescent, Floridian, Northeast Regional, Silver Meteor; VRE: ■ Fredericksburg Line, ■ Manassas Line; Metro: Blue Line, Yellow Line; Metrobus, DASH
Virginia	Quantico	Quantico	Amtrak: Northeast Regional; VRE: ■ Fredericksburg Line; PRTC
Virginia	Fredericksburg	Fredericksburg	Amtrak: Northeast Regional, Silver Meteor; VRE: ■ Fredericksburg Line; FRED
Virginia	Richmond	Richmond Staples Mill Road	Amtrak: Floridian, Northeast Regional, Palmetto, Silver Meteor, Amtrak Thruway to Charlottesville; GRTC
Virginia	Ettrick	Petersburg	Amtrak: Floridian, Northeast Regional, Palmetto, Silver Meteor
North Carolina	Rocky Mount	Rocky Mount	Amtrak: Floridian, Palmetto, Silver Meteor; Tar River Transit; Intercity bus: Greyhound
North Carolina	Wilson	Wilson	Amtrak: Palmetto, Amtrak Thruway to Greenville, New Bern, Havelock, Morehead City, Goldsboro, Kinston, Jacksonville, and Wilmington, North Carolina
North Carolina	Selma	Selma-Smithfield	Amtrak: Palmetto
North Carolina	Raleigh	Raleigh	Amtrak: Floridian, Piedmont; GoRaleigh, GoTriangle
North Carolina	Raleigh	North Carolina State Fair	Only served during North Carolina State Fair; Amtrak: Piedmont
North Carolina	Cary	Cary	Amtrak: Floridian, Piedmont; GoCary, GoTriangle
North Carolina	Durham	Durham	Amtrak: Piedmont; GoDurham, GoTriangle; Intercity bus: Greyhound Buses, Megabus
North Carolina	Burlington	Burlington	Amtrak: Piedmont; Elon BioBus, Alamance County Transportation Authority, Burlington Link Transit
North Carolina	Greensboro	Greensboro	Amtrak: Crescent, Piedmont; GTA, PART; Intercity bus: Greyhound
North Carolina	High Point	High Point	Amtrak: Crescent, Piedmont, Amtrak Thruway. (Note: Amtrak contracts with PART to provide Thruway service to Winston-Salem. Passage is available via through-ticketing or as a separate fare. Both methods are co-branded as NC Amtrak Connector.); Hi tran, PART
North Carolina	Lexington	Lexington	Only served during Lexington Barbecue Festival; full-time station planned. Amtrak: Piedmont
North Carolina	Salisbury	Salisbury	Amtrak: Crescent, Piedmont; Salisbury Transit
North Carolina	Kannapolis	Kannapolis	Amtrak: Piedmont; CK Rider
North Carolina	Charlotte	Charlotte	Amtrak: Crescent, Piedmont; CATS
