= Salisbury Railroad Corridor Historic District =

Historic district in North Carolina, United States

- U.S. National Register of Historic Places
- U.S. Historic district
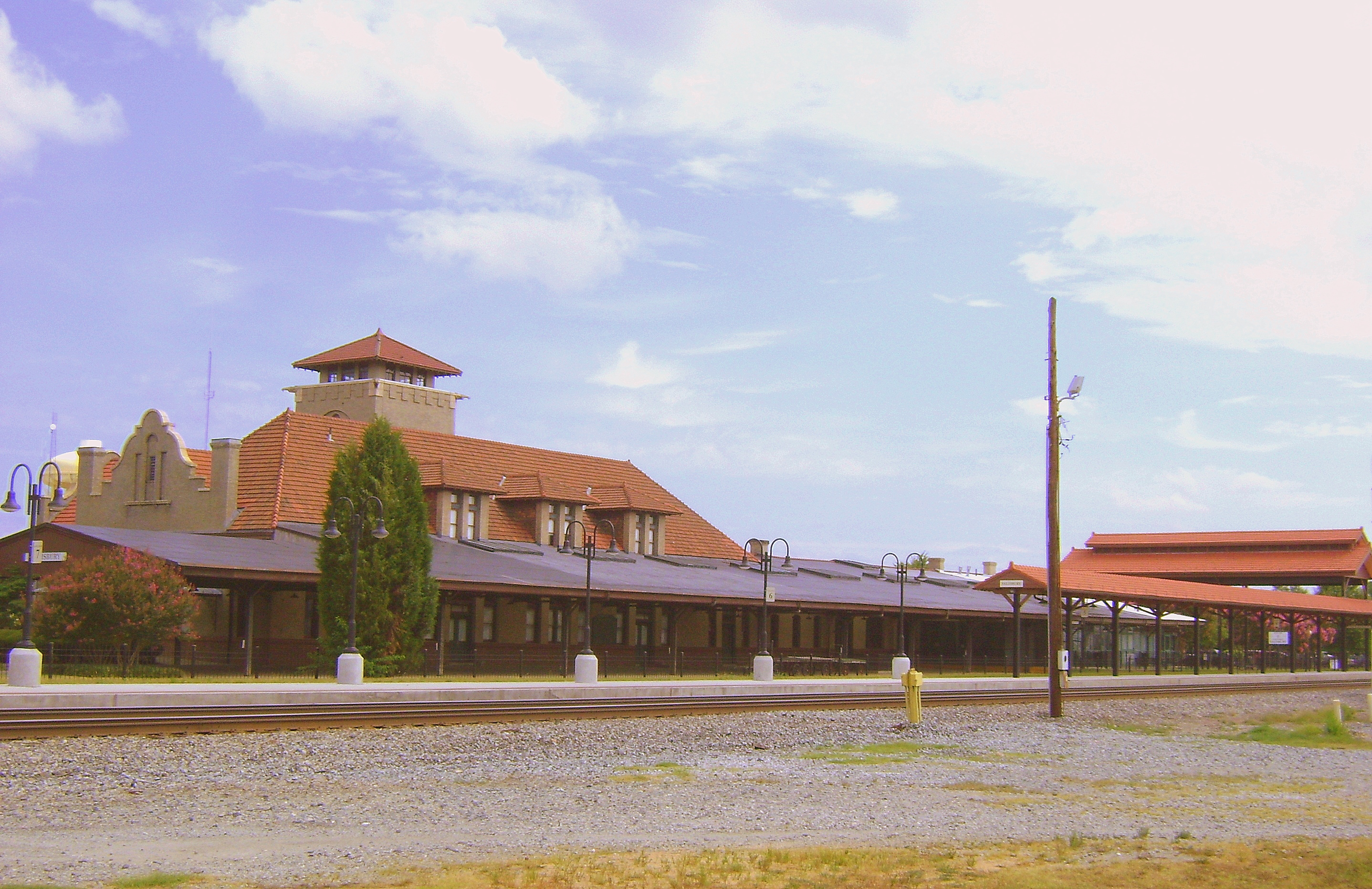
- Salisbury Railroad Corridor Historic District, July 2010

- Location within North Carolina Location within the United States
- Location: Roughly East Council, Liberty, Kerr, Cemetery, Franklin, Lee, and Depot Sts.; also the 300 and 400 blocks of N. Lee St., Salisbury, North Carolina
- Coordinates: 35°40′06″N 80°27′53″W
- Area: 25.3 acres (10.2 ha)
- Built: 1905
- Architect: Milburn, Frank P.; Et al.
- Architectural style: Mission/spanish Revival, Spanish Mission Style
- NRHP reference No.: 86003460, 03000342 (Boundary Increase)
- Added to NRHP: May 13, 1987, May 1, 2003 (Boundary Increase)

Salisbury Railroad Corridor Historic District is a national historic district located at Salisbury, Rowan County, North Carolina. The district encompasses 37 contributing buildings and 1 contributing site consisting primarily of railroad-related and commercial buildings. It largely developed during the first half of the 20th century, and includes notable examples of Mission Revival style architecture. Located in the district is the separately listed Salisbury Southern Railroad Passenger Depot designed by Frank Pierce Milburn. Other notable buildings include the Cheerwine/Carolina Beverage Corporation Building (1913), Yadkin Hotel (1913), Frick Building (c. 1905), Boyden-Overman Company Cotton Warehouse (c. 1910), and Old Freight Depot (c. 1907).

It was listed on the National Register of Historic Places in 1987, with a boundary increase in 2003.
