= High Point Transit System =

North Carolina, USA transport company

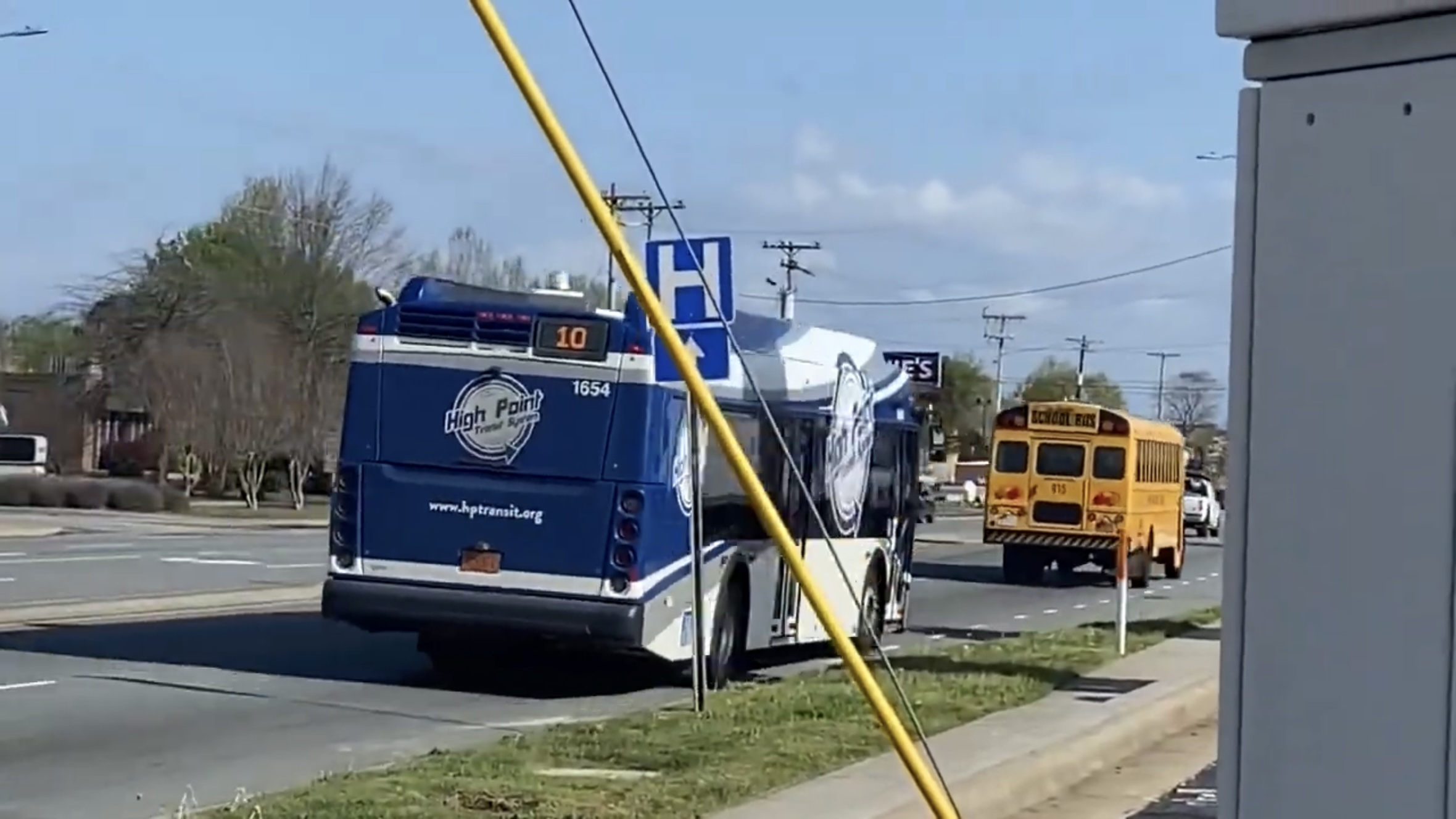
- High Point Transit System Bus #1654 on Route 10 North Main Street
- Parent: City of High Point
- Founded: 1975
- Headquarters: 716 West Martin Luther King Jr Drive
- Locale: High Point
- Service area: Guilford County, NC
- Service type: bus service, paratransit
- Routes: 12
- Fuel type: Diesel

High Point Transit System is the operator of public transportation in the High Point, North Carolina, area. It complements three other local bus services and one regional bus service in the Piedmont Triad. Twelve routes operate almost entirely within the city limits.

== Facilities ==
=== Transit Operations Center ===
Address: 716 West Martin Luther King Jr Drive
Coordinates: 35°57′11.4″N 80°00′49.1″W
Facilities: Administration, bus storage and maintenance

=== Broad Avenue Terminal ===
Address: 201 West Broad Avenue
Coordinates: 35°57′26.3″N 80°00′25.0″W
Facilities: Main transfer point for the transit system, adjacent to the Amtrak station

== Routes ==
- 10 North Main Street
- 11 South Main Street
- 12 West Green Drive
- 13 Montlieu Avenue
- 14 Westchester Drive
- 15 Oak Hollow Mall
- 16 Leonard Avenue
- 17 Washington Street
- 18 East Green Drive
- 19 English Road
- 20 Kearns Avenue
- 25 GTCC/Jamestown
- PART Route 19: High Point Express, connects between the Broad Avenue Terminal and the regional hub in Greensboro.

== Microtransit ==
In March 2025, High Point announce HPTSGo!, a microtransit program offering pre-booked shared rides in areas not covered by the city's bus routes.
