= Charlotte station (Amtrak) =

Amtrak Station in Charlotte, North Carolina

Charlotte, NC
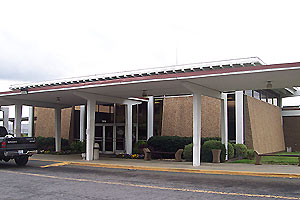
- Station entrance

General information
- Location: 1914 North Tryon Street; Charlotte, North Carolina; United States
- Coordinates: 35°14′28″N 80°49′22″W
- Owner: Norfolk Southern Railway
- Lines: NCRR Corridor; Charlotte District
- Platforms: 1 island platform
- Tracks: 2
- Connections: CATS: 11

Construction
- Structure type: At-grade
- Parking: 80 spaces; free
- Accessible: Yes
- Architect: Walter Hook Associates, Inc.
- Architectural style: Mid-century modern

Other information
- Station code: Amtrak: CLT

History
- Opened: November 6, 1962; 63 years ago
- Original company: Southern Railway

Passengers
- FY 2025: 365,514 (Amtrak)

Services
Preceding station	Amtrak	Following station
Gastonia toward New Orleans	Crescent	Salisbury toward New York
Terminus	Carolinian	Kannapolis toward New York
Terminus	Piedmont	Kannapolis toward Raleigh
Former services
Preceding station	Southern Railway	Following station
Belmont toward Birmingham	Main Line	Concord toward Washington, D.C.
Terminus	Charlotte – Savannah	Griffith toward Savannah
Derita toward Taylorsville	Taylorsville – Charlotte	Terminus
Location

Charlotte station is an Amtrak station located at 1914 North Tryon Street, about 1.5 miles (2.4 km) northeast of Uptown Charlotte. Owned by Norfolk Southern, it is located near that railroad's yard outside Uptown.

It is the southern terminus for the Carolinian and Piedmont, as well as a service stop on the Crescent. As of fiscal year 2023, it is the busiest station in North Carolina, and one of the busiest in the Southeast.

The outdated station, disconnected from the city center, will be replaced by a new station uptown, Charlotte Gateway Station, which is scheduled to open for Amtrak service by 2028.

== History ==
Opened in 1962, this was Charlotte's second station to be served by the Southern Railway, now part of Norfolk Southern. It was designed by local architectural firm Walter Hook Associates, Inc. The structure was designed to be constructed quickly and therefore included the use of an exposed precast concrete framing system. A separate mail building (freight depot) and boiler house were also constructed northeast of the station. The facility is smaller than its predecessor station on 531 West Trade Street, which was a response to the dramatic decrease in passenger rail service of that time. Southern Railway continued passenger rail service until 1979, when it was turned over to Amtrak.

Southern was one of the few large railroads that opted out of Amtrak in 1971. For most of the 1970s, Southern ran two routes through Charlotte. In addition to the overnight Southern Crescent, it operated the Piedmont Limited (no relation to the current Amtrak service), a daytime train that ran from Atlanta to Washington–essentially, the middle leg of the Southern Crescent. The Piedmont was truncated to a Charlotte-Washington train for much of 1975, then cut back even further to Salisbury before being discontinued altogether in 1976, shortly before Southern bowed out of passenger service and handed its trains to Amtrak in 1979.

For most of the next two decades, the only train that called at Charlotte was the Crescent, which arrived late at night in both directions. An early version of the Carolinian provided daylight service for much of 1984 and 1985. Since the Carolinian returned in 1990, the station has seen increased traffic, and is now served by 12 trains per day. In 2002, with partnership with the North Carolina Department of Transportation (NCDOT), the station was expanded with additional space for the waiting area, additional ticket window and new benches that replaced the original wood furniture. It is the busiest Amtrak station in North Carolina, and has the highest ridership of any Amtrak station in the Southeast, outside of Virginia.

=== Predecessor stations ===
==== Seaboard Depot ====
Opened in June 1896, the Seaboard Depot (also referred as Seaboard station) was designed by Charles Hook and is located at 945 North College Street. The station was a replacement of an earlier station built by the Wilmington, Charlotte and Rutherfordton Railroad Company, from 1858-1895. The two-story pink stucco station offered white and colored waiting areas on the first floor, separated by a hallway and ticket office, toilet facilities and a baggage room; the second floor was dedicated to railroad use: an office and engineers' dormitory, conductors' and train master's rooms, telegraph room and convenience areas.

Renovation to the station occurred in 1916–17, at a cost of $22,000. Drafted by Seaboard architects and constructed by A. M. Walkup Company of Richmond, Virginia; the facility was enlarged by adding one-story additions on both ends, a wide umbrella shed and facade changes. In November 1958, the station discontinued passenger service; the station was used afterwards as a yard office before being sold to Union Ministry Center.

Up until 1958, the Seaboard Air Line Railroad operated a daily passenger train from this station to Wilmington.

==== Richmond and Danville Depot ====
Built in 1886, the Richmond and Danville Depot was located on Trade Street on the east side of the downtown bypass tracks. Replacing the Atlanta & Charlotte depot, which was located same area but on opposite side of tracks, it was two-and-half-story with eaves on nearly all sides. The facility including two waiting rooms, ticket office, dining room, kitchen (2nd floor), telegram office, baggage area and a Southern Express Company (packaging services) office. In 1894, ownership changed to the Southern Railway Company; eleven years later the station was razed and replaced.

==== Southern Depot ====
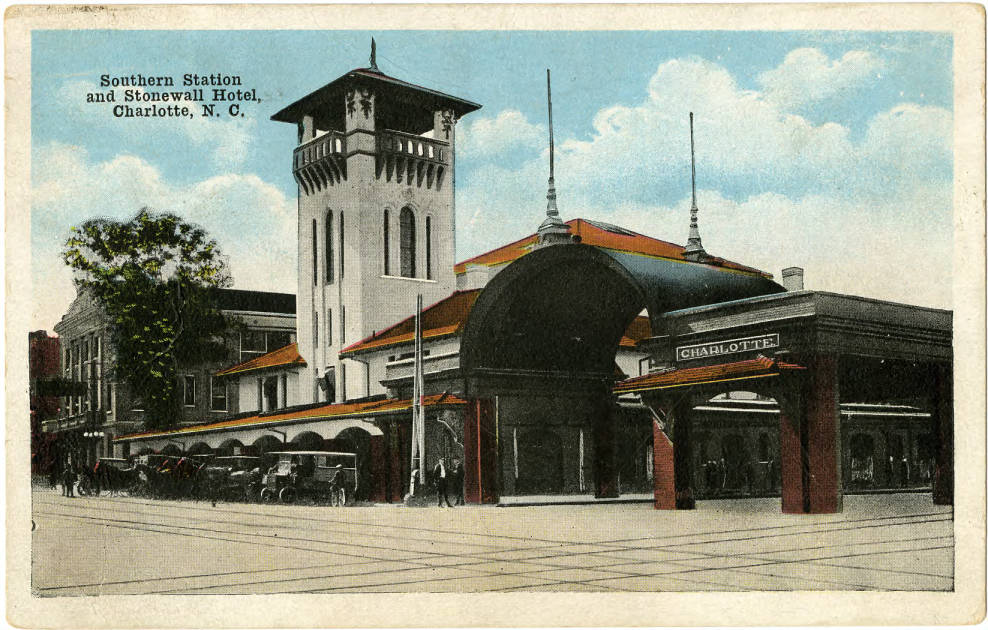
Postcard of Southern Station and Stonewall Hotel

Opened in 1906, the Southern Depot (also referred as Southern Station) was designed by Frank Milburn and was located at 531 West Trade Street. Replacing the Richmond and Danville Depot, which was located in same area, the three-story Mediterranean style station had one side platform and one island platform operating on three tracks. The facility included waiting areas, ticket office and baggage facilities on the first floor; the second floor was dedicated to railroad use and a five-story tower. A separate two-story Southern Express Company (packaging services) building was located south adjacent to station, while the three-story Stonewall Hotel was located east adjacent to the station. Eaves on nearly all sides of the station, it also had a high arch going over two tracks, connecting with the island platform canopy.

Multiple trains per day traveled through the station on the route of today's Crescent, the Southern Railway incarnation of the train, as well as other trains, such as the Peach Queen. The station was also the point of departure for the Southern's Augusta Special toward Augusta, Georgia's Augusta Union Station by way of Columbia, South Carolina until the route's termination in 1966.

Because of a grade separation project and the reduction in passenger service, the station was replaced in November 1962 with the current Southern, and later Amtrak, station at 1914 North Tryon Street. The station was razed from February 1963, with demolition work completed later that year. Two of the three tracks were raised to separate grade crossings with Fourth, Trade and Fifth streets. In November 1973, a Greyhound station was opened where the Southern Depot once stood, while unused land became car parking lots.

==== Interurban Depot ====
Opened in July 1912, the Piedmont and Northern Railway Interurban Depot (also referred to as Interurban Station) was located at 425 West Fourth Street, across from the Charlotte Mint. The rail line was electrified to 1,500 volts DC, connecting Charlotte to Mount Holly, Belmont and Gastonia. In 1951, passenger operations were discontinued and the depot was razed by 1970. The area remained dormant for decades, used on occasion for car parking and storage; in 2012, the land was redeveloped into the BB&T Ballpark.

== Services ==
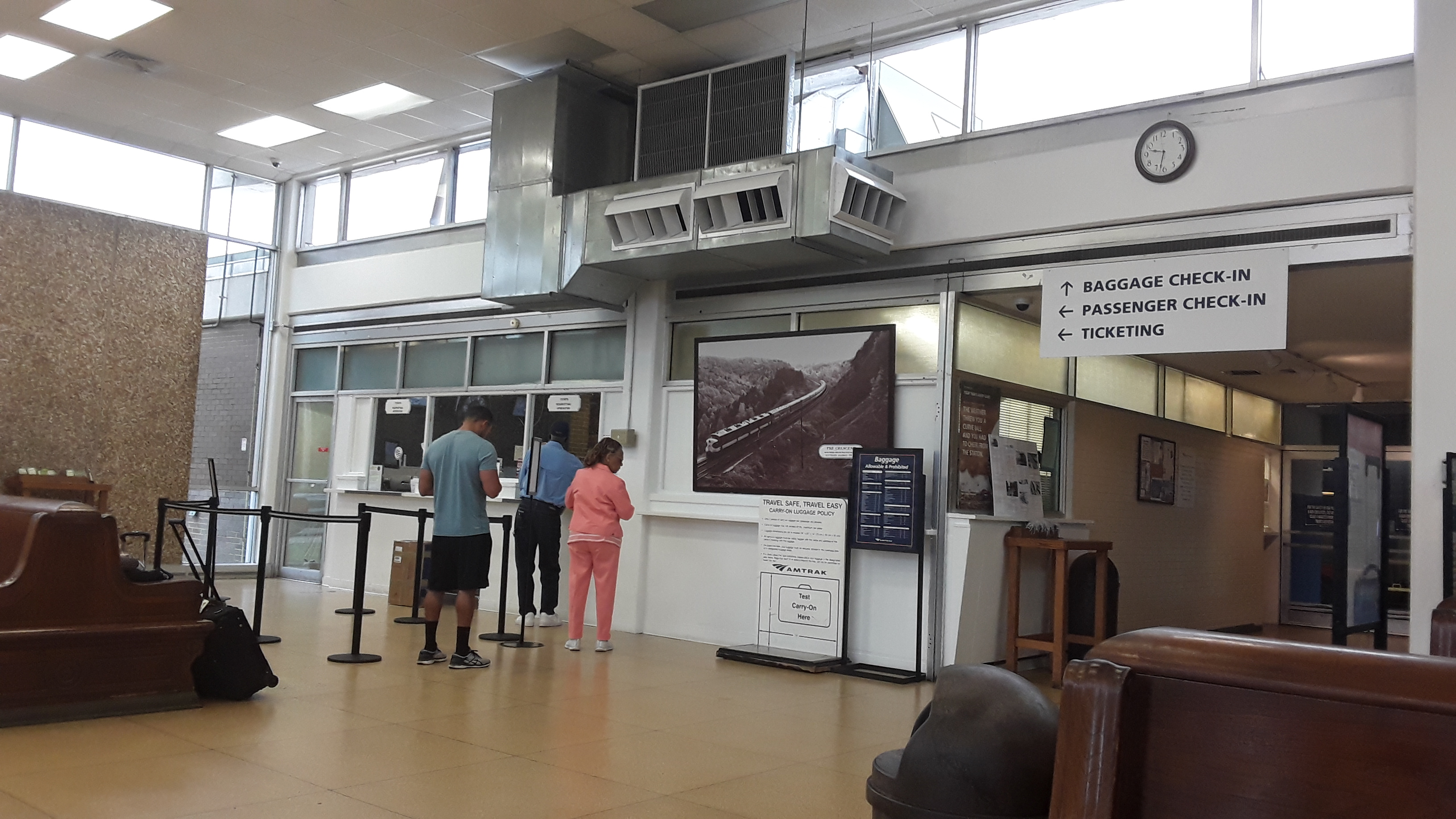
Waiting room

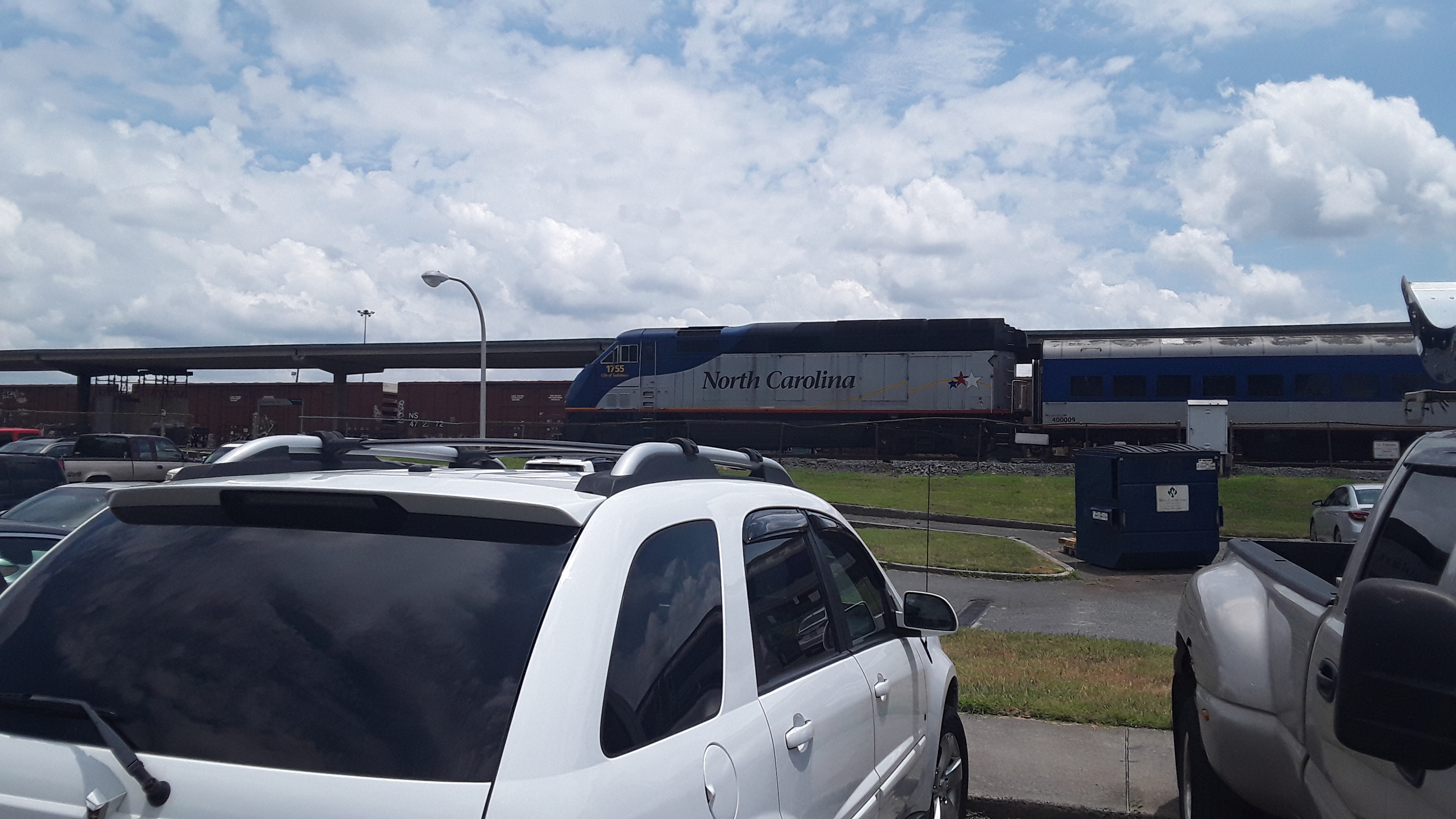
The westbound Piedmont viewed from the station parking lot

The station is served by three Amtrak routes, for a total of 12 trains daily. An additional Piedmont round trip was slated to begin by 2020, but was not added until 2023.

- The Carolinian (southern terminus), with the northbound train leaving for New York just before the morning rush and the southbound train arriving in Charlotte in the evening.
- The Piedmont (southern terminus), a regional counterpart of the Carolinian, with four round trips to Raleigh.
- The Crescent, with one train passing overnight in each direction. It is the only Amtrak route that enters Charlotte from the south.

The facility is open 24 hours, which includes the ticket office, Quik-Trak kiosks, waiting area and restrooms. Services provided include passenger assistance, baggage service, bike boxes and bag storage. Free short and long-term parking is available.

Charlotte Area Transit System bus number 11 meets all Carolinian and Piedmont trains. This route also serves riders who want to board the northbound Crescent, which normally arrives at 5:31 am.

== Station layout ==
The current station's exterior incorporates dark brown brick and large, angled concrete panels covered in pebble-dash. Interspersed with these heavy, solid elements are transparent walls of glass, which—coupled with clerestory windows beneath the roof—allow ample natural light to flood the 1,200-square-foot (110 m^{2}) waiting room. In keeping with the aesthetics of Mid-Century Modern architecture, the station has minimal applied ornamentation.

== Future ==
The plan for passenger rail service in Charlotte is to return to Center City with the proposed Charlotte Gateway Station. To be located again along West Trade Street, it is to be an intermodal transit center linking inter-city Amtrak service with local bus, intercity bus, CityLynx Gold Line and taxi/ridesharing services. When completed, the current station will be decommissioned and closed.
