= Piedmont Authority for Regional Transportation =

- Founded: 1998
- Service area: Piedmont Triad
- Service type: bus service
- Routes: 17
- Hubs: Coble Transportation Center
- Daily ridership: 1,300 (weekdays, Q1 2026)
- Annual ridership: 376,100 (2025)
- Operator: National Express Transit
- Website: partnc.org

Piedmont Authority for Regional Transportation (PART) provides inter-city and regional public transportation for the Greensboro, Winston-Salem and High Point, NC, combined statistical area, known as the Piedmont Triad area. In 2025, the system had a ridership of 376,100, or about 1,300 per weekday as of the first quarter of 2026.

== Member Counties ==
- Alamance
- Davie
- Davidson
- Forsyth
- Guilford
- Randolph
- Rockingham
- Stokes
- Yadkin

== History ==
In the winter of 1989 the city managers, transportation advisory committee chairpersons, and the directors of transportation for the cities of Greensboro, High Point, and Winston-Salem held a joint meeting to discuss transportation related issues in the Triad Region. It was a necessity known by all represented that better planning needed to occur to improve the transportation systems throughout the Piedmont Triad. A lack of regional level communication and planning between districts and divisions of the cities and state, respectively, had been a contributing factor to congestion and diminishing the quality of life. In the fall of 1993, the NCDOT provided funding for what has been called a "phase one study to develop a Regional Transportation Plan."

In the fall of 1995, the Transit 2001 Commission was appointed by Governor Jim Hunt to investigate the future of North Carolina's transit industry.

In the fall of 1996, a second phase Regional Transportation Study initiated a meeting of the mayors and others throughout the Triad to discuss the formation of a new Triad Transportation Authority.

In February 1997, the Transit 2001 Commission released its final report. The Transit 2001 report had been regarded as the map for the future of North Carolina's transit industry.

In June 1997, the North Carolina General Assembly passed Article 27, GS160A, authorizing the formation of a Regional Transportation Authority in the Triad. The NC General Assembly also appropriated $750,000 to conduct two separate rail corridor studies in the Triad to be administered by the new Regional Transportation Authority. Moreover, in June 1997, authorization for new revenue sources to fund Regional Transportation Programs was established.

In the Fall of 1997, representatives of local governments met to arrange for the formation of a Regional Transportation Authority in the Piedmont Triad.

On October 6, 1998, the Piedmont Authority for Regional Transportation held its inaugural meeting of the board of trustees. The PART Board of Trustees has been meeting regularly since the inaugural meeting of 1998. The board of trustees have established a work program, adopted a business plan and have increased staff to manage the activities of the Regional Transportation Authority.

In 2012, PART chose National Express Transit as its contractor, after the bankruptcy of previous operator Coach America.

On February 21, 2022, the Surry County Board of County Commissioners voted to withdraw their membership from PART effective June 30, 2022.

== Route list (Effective May 1, 2022) ==
=== Weekday Routes (Effective May 1, 2022) ===
1 — Winston-Salem Express	Coble Transportation Center to Downtown Winston-Salem
2 — Greensboro Express	Coble Transportation Center to Downtown Greensboro
3 — High Point Express	Coble Transportation Center to Downtown High Point
4 — Alamance-Burlington Express	Coble Transportation Center to Chapel Hill via downtown Greensboro, Burlington, Graham and Mebane
9 — Davidson County Express	Thomasville and downtown High Point to UNCG and downtown Greensboro
10 — Randolph County Express	NC Zoo, Asheboro and Randleman to UNCG and downtown Greensboro
17 — Kernersville Express	Kernersville to downtown Winston-Salem and the Coble Transportation Center
20 — Pleasant Ridge	Coble Transportation Center to nearby facilities to the west
21 — Chimney Rock	Coble Transportation Center to nearby facilities to the east
22 — Sandy Ridge	Coble Transportation Center to nearby areas to the south
23 — Piedmont Parkway	Coble Transportation Center to nearby facilities to the south
24 — Burgess/Regional Road	Coble Transportation Center to facilities in its direct vicinity
25 — PTI Airport	Coble Transportation Center to Piedmont-Triad International Airport

=== Saturday Routes ===
1 — Winston-Salem Express	Coble Transportation Center to Downtown Winston-Salem
2 — Greensboro Express	Coble Transportation Center to Downtown Greensboro
3 — High Point Express	Coble Transportation Center to Downtown High Point
North-South Saturday	On-demand service from Coble Transportation Center to destinations along Weekday Routes 20, 21, 22, 23 and 24
PTI Airport Saturday	On-demand service from Coble Transportation Center destinations along Weekday Route 25-PTI Airport Corridor
