= North Carolina Railroad =

Rail corridor

- Route of the North Carolina Railroad, in blue.

Overview
- Parent company: State of North Carolina
- Headquarters: Raleigh, North Carolina
- Reporting mark: NCRR
- Locale: Between Morehead City and Charlotte
- Dates of operation: 1854–

Technical
- Track gauge: 4 ft 8 1/2 in (1,435 mm) standard gauge
- Previous gauge: 4 ft 8 in (1,422 mm)
- Length: 317 miles (510 km)

Other
- Website: ncrr.com

The North Carolina Railroad (reporting mark NCRR) is a 317-mile (510 km) state-owned rail corridor extending from Morehead City, North Carolina, to Charlotte. The railroad carries over 70 freight trains (operated by the Norfolk Southern Railway) and ten passenger trains (Amtrak's Carolinian and Piedmont) daily. The railroad works with the North Carolina Department of Commerce and the North Carolina Department of Transportation on capital-improvement projects.

== History ==
In 1848, the North Carolina Legislature authorized a railroad that would connect the eastern part of the state with the Piedmont. North Carolina Senate President Calvin Graves cast the deciding vote, ensuring that the railroad would be built, but ending his political career because it would not pass through his district. The North Carolina Railroad was incorporated January 27, 1849, by special act of the legislature.

In 1851, Senator Graves was given the honor of lifting the first shovel of soil as construction of the railroad began in Greensboro. In 1854, the railroad's first president, businessman John Motley Morehead, dubbed the rail line "the tree of life" for the state.

About 130 miles of the 4 ft 8 in (1,422 mm)-gauge railroad, between Greensboro and Goldsboro, was opened for operation on December 13, 1855. About 94 miles of the railroad, between Greensboro and Charlotte, was opened on January 30, 1856. In early 1856, the first train traveled along the entire route from Goldsboro to Charlotte.

At the close of the American Civil War in May 1865, the shareholders' inspection committee examined and delivered a report on the status of the railway. The document noted significant damage to the tracks from rain and flooding, the wholesale destruction of about 10 miles of track near Salisbury by federal forces, and the burning of the depots at Raleigh, Goldsboro, High Point, and Salisbury, as well as the burning of several facilities in Charlotte. The track east of Raleigh had been sabotaged by retreating Confederate forces during the closing stages of the war and was under the jurisdiction of the United States Military Railroad.

In 1858, the Atlantic and North Carolina Railroad was completed, opening 96 miles (154 km) of rail between Goldsboro and Shepard's Point, now Morehead City. Efforts to consolidate the Atlantic and North Carolina with the NCRR began in 1866, but completing the merger and consolidating the railroads from Morehead City to Charlotte was not completed until 1989.

The North Carolina Railroad was leased to the Richmond and Danville Railroad Company and its receiver from September 11, 1871, to June 30, 1894.

From July 1, 1894, the North Carolina Railroad was leased to the R&D's successor, the Southern Railway Company, for 99 years. Southern merged with Norfolk & Western Railway to form Norfolk Southern, which inherited the NCRR lease. Norfolk Southern retained control of the railroad until 1999, when NCRR and Norfolk Southern reached an exclusive trackage rights agreement enabling Norfolk Southern to continue freight and maintenance operations on the NCRR line for 15 years, renewable for 30 more years.

In 1929, Governor O. Max Gardner appointed Fanny Yarborough Bickett as the first woman president of the railroad. She was succeeded by Cora Lily Woodard Aycock in 1933.

In 1998, one year before the establishment of the new lease with Norfolk Southern, the State of North Carolina agreed to buy out the remaining 25% of private shares of NCRR stock. While the NCRR is still nominally a private company, all of the voting stock is held by the state.

In 2000, the North Carolina Legislature established by statute that North Carolina Railroad Company dividends paid to the state were required to be used by the North Carolina Department of Transportation for improvements to the NCRR line. At that time, NCRR was a real estate investment trust. In 2013, the legislature rewrote this statute to enable NCDOT to use its dividends of the North Carolina Railroad Company for the purposes set forth in the statute.

== Today ==
Recently, the North Carolina Railroad Company added three new passing sidings over eight miles and centralized traffic control between Raleigh and Selma (30 miles) to increase capacity for both freight and passenger trains. The company is also replacing several other bridges along the corridor to improve safety, efficiency, and speed. Other improvements made by the NCRR since 2001 include rail and bridge upgrades between Raleigh and Morehead City, at a cost in excess of $60 million. In 2010, the company completed commuter rail investment and ridership studies for the segments between Goldsboro and Greensboro, through Raleigh.

Since 2008, the North Carolina Railroad Company has been working with the North Carolina Department of Transportation and Norfolk Southern to improve crossing safety on the eastern portion of the line by upgrading gates and crossing signals. The Company is also working with these parties to add or replace double track between Charlotte and Raleigh in an initiative to extend higher-speed passenger rail south to Charlotte from Washington via Richmond, Virginia.

The North Carolina Railroad was instrumental in encouraging the economic development of North Carolina in the 19th century, helping to define new markets, new industries, and new cities. Today, NCRR continues to contribute to the state’s economy. NCRR carries over one million carloads of freight each year and about 300,000 passengers. Based on a 2007 study by the Research Triangle Institute, the railroad saves North Carolina industries $198 million in transportation costs annually, and the total impact on North Carolina economic output is $338 million annually. In 2005, in counties bordering NCRR tracks, industries using rail freight services accounted for $143 billion in output, more than 24% of North Carolina’s total economy. NCRR freight transportation also has environmental advantages, conveying $65.7 million in external benefits.

In 2012, the Program Evaluation Division of the General Assembly conducted an evaluation of the railroad. The evaluation report recommended maintaining ownership of the North Carolina Railroad, payment of both one-time and annual dividends, and stronger reporting requirements.

== See also ==
- North Carolina Department of Transportation
- Amtrak
- Norfolk Southern Railway

== Works cited ==
- Trelease, Allen W. (1991). The North Carolina Railroad, 1849–1871, and the Modernization of North Carolina. UNC Press. ISBN 0-8078-1941-7.
