= Southeast High Speed Rail Corridor =

Proposed passenger rail project in the United States

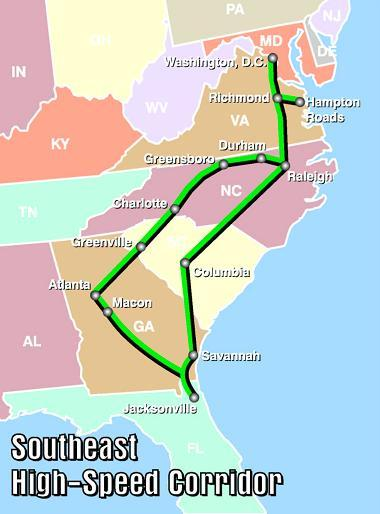
Corridor as designated by the Federal Railroad Administration

The Southeast High Speed Rail Corridor (SEHSR) is a proposed passenger rail transportation project in the Mid-Atlantic and Southeastern United States to build high-speed passenger rail services into the Southeast. Routes would extend south via Richmond and Petersburg, Virginia, with a spur to Norfolk in Virginia's Hampton Roads region; the mainline would continue south to Raleigh, Durham, Greensboro, and Charlotte, North Carolina. Since the corridor was first established in 1992, the U.S. Department of Transportation (USDOT) has extended it further to Atlanta and Macon, Georgia; Greenville and Columbia, South Carolina; Jacksonville, Florida; and Birmingham, Alabama.

== History ==
Funding for the SEHSR in the early 2000s was by the USDOT and the states of North Carolina and Virginia. Both states already funded some non-high-speed rail service operated for them by Amtrak, and own locomotives and passenger cars.

On January 28, 2010, the White House announced that Southeast Corridor would receive $620 million of its request. This money was primarily for capacity upgrades along the Raleigh–Charlotte portion of the corridor (a.k.a. the Piedmont Improvement Program), along with some money for the Richmond–D.C. portion, as the Tier II Environmental Impact Statement (EIS) for the important Raleigh–Richmond portion was not expected to be complete until 2015. The first large section of the SEHSR, from Washington, D.C., through Virginia and North Carolina south to Charlotte, was projected in 2010 to begin service sometime between 2018 and 2022, based on funding availability.

In 2019, the Commonwealth of Virginia announced it would acquire the abandoned portion of the CSX S-Line between Petersburg, Virginia and Ridgeway, North Carolina; negotiate rights for a route from Petersburg to Richmond; acquire large portions of right-of-way and track from CSX between Richmond and Washington; and purchase and rebuild the bridge over the Potomac River.

Later in 2020, the State of North Carolina received federal funding allowing for the purchase of the active segment of the CSX S-line between Ridgeway and Raleigh.

As of 2023, Tier II planning is complete for the Washington to Raleigh section, and for portions of the Raleigh to Charlotte section. Tier I planning, in cooperation with North Carolina, South Carolina and Georgia, is complete for the Charlotte to Atlanta section, with some routing to be determined.

== Route ==
=== D.C.–Richmond ===
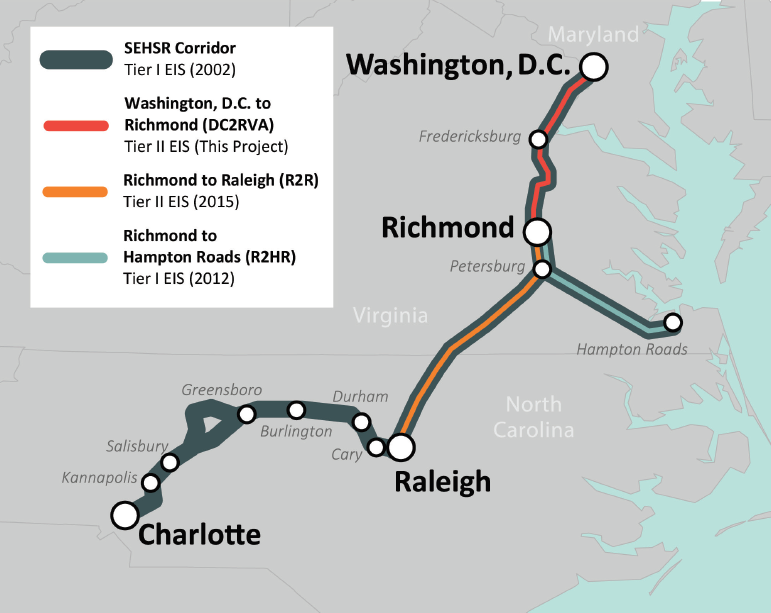
Map from Washington to Charlotte and Hampton Roads, with the status of each SEHSR segment indicated.

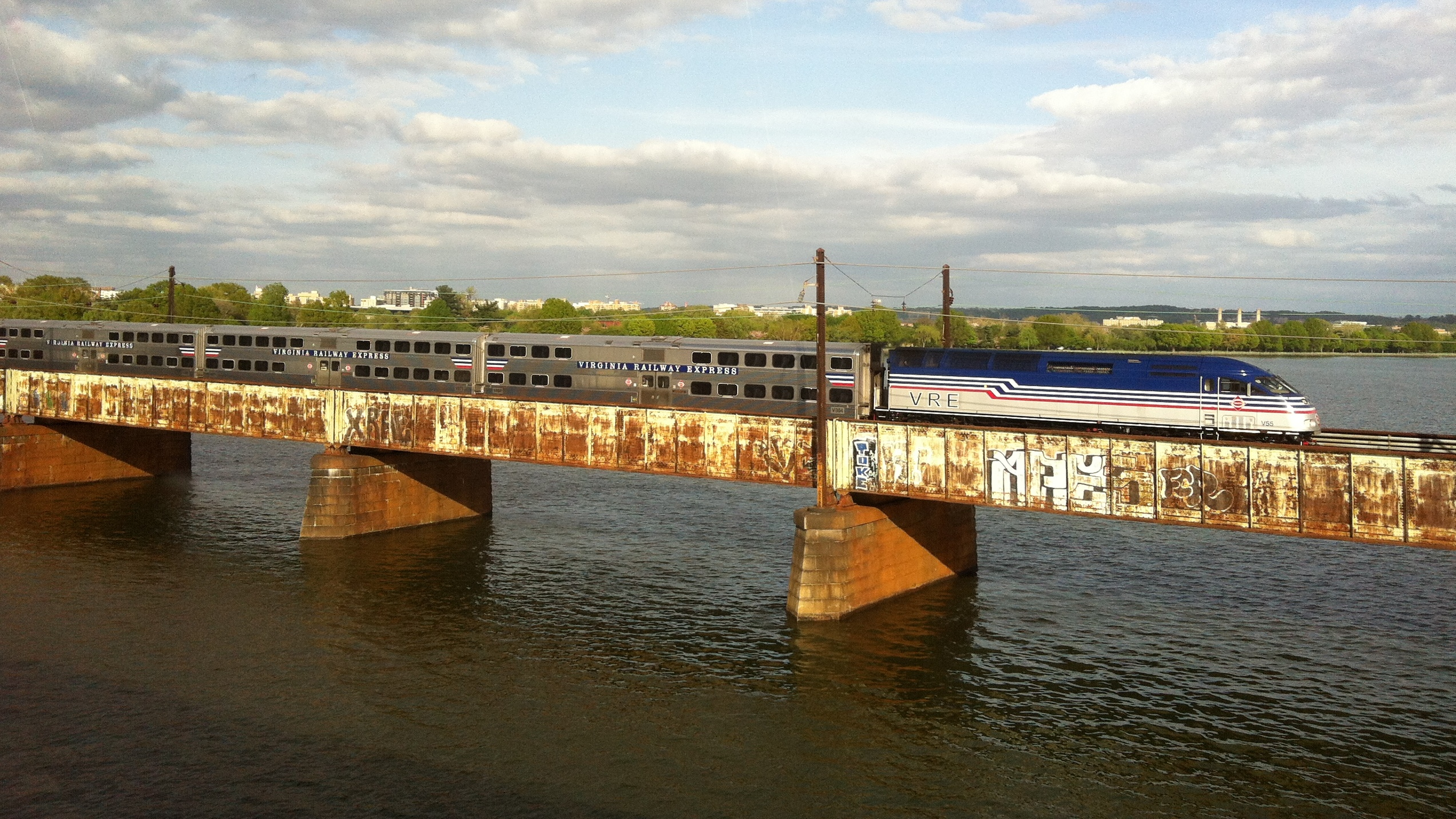
Expanding the Long Bridge over the Potomac River from two to four tracks will allow a doubling of the amount of Amtrak service between Washington D.C. and Virginia, including services proposed under the SEHSR plan.

The D.C. to Richmond segment of the proposed corridor travels along 123 miles of CSX track currently used by CSX freight trains, non-high-speed Amtrak trains, and the VRE commuter rail's Fredericksburg Line. Federal funding in the amount of $75 million issued in September 2012 paid for construction of a third main track in Stafford and Prince William counties, while Virginia's Atlantic Gateway infrastructure project funded additional main tracks in two segments in Fairfax County along with some of the design and engineering costs for providing relief for the capacity constrained Long Bridge over the Potomac River between DC and Alexandria. In October 2014, the Federal Railroad Administration filed a notice of intent to perform (in partnership with the Virginia Department of Rail and Public Transportation) a Tier II EIS for upgrading this segment, with the aim of increasing train frequency and cutting the current travel time by thirty minutes. The draft version of the Tier II EIS was released in September 2017, with the final version released in May 2019. The study covered the corridor from the Long Bridge to a rail junction at Centralia, five miles south of Richmond. A new bridge would be built over the James River to expand service to Richmond Main Street station (RVM). Currently north-south through trains stop only at Richmond Staples Mill Road station (RVR), using the bypass Belt Line across the river. RVM, near the State Capitol, is preferred under federal guidelines as a central city location. The package of projects between DC and Richmond are projected to result in travel times of 2 hours and 15 minutes between the two cities.

Significant infrastructure changes between the draft and final EIS in May 2019 included:

- Coordination with VRE station expansions and improvements.
- Clarification that Ashland (ASD) would receive no additional track or station improvements. A bypass had been considered before the draft version.
- Clarification that all Amtrak trains would stop at both RVR and RVM, except the non-stop Auto Train from Lorton to Florida.

In December 2019, Virginia agreed to acquire 350 miles of right of way from CSX, effectively giving the Commonwealth control over much of the Richmond-D.C. leg of the corridor. As part of the deal, Virginia will build a new two-track rail bridge over the Potomac River for Amtrak and VRE trains parallel to the existing Long Bridge. The new bridge will take passenger traffic off the existing bridge, which will serve only freight traffic. The Long Bridge has historically been one of the worst bottlenecks in the national rail system. The Commonwealth of Virginia will cover roughly one-third of the costs, federal funds (including Amtrak) will cover another third, and the remainder will be sought from a variety of regional partners, such as VRE, the Northern Virginia Transportation Authority, the District of Columbia, and Maryland, all of which have pledged support for bridge expansion.

=== Richmond–Norfolk (Hampton Roads spur) ===
In 1996, USDOT added a connection from Richmond east to Newport News to SEHSR. However, with the extension of Northeast Regional Amtrak service to Norfolk in December 2012, the Virginia Department of Rail and Public Transportation (DRPT) re-evaluated rail access to the Hampton Roads metropolitan area and on September 1, 2012, announced that while rail service from Richmond to Newport News will be maintained, the preferred high-speed corridor has been shifted to a Richmond–Petersburg–Norfolk alignment. The current Amtrak route through Suffolk would change to achieve more separation from freight, and a suburban station would be added at Bower's Hill in Chesapeake.

In November 2014 the Hampton Roads Transportation Planning Organization (HRTPO) released a report recommending a different route, from Richmond to Suffolk to Norfolk via a new crossing of the James River near Charles City, bypassing Petersburg. This would provide combined high speed rail for a western portion of the Newport News route. It is not clear if the 2014 report will influence the project.

Meanwhile, Virginia plans to expand conventional Amtrak service to both Newport News and Norfolk as part of a funding plan announced December 2019, encompassing major steps towards SEHSR on the Washington to Raleigh line.

=== Richmond–Raleigh (S-Line) ===
Between Richmond and Raleigh, the corridor uses the CSX S-line (the former Seaboard Air Line main line), which generally parallels US 1. The tracks on the segment of this line between Centralia, Virginia and Norlina, North Carolina were removed in the late 1980s and through traffic shifted to the CSX A-line (the former Atlantic Coast Line main line). The relative absence of freight trains along the remaining portions of the S-line will mean that significant curve straightening and other work can be accomplished without disrupting current service.

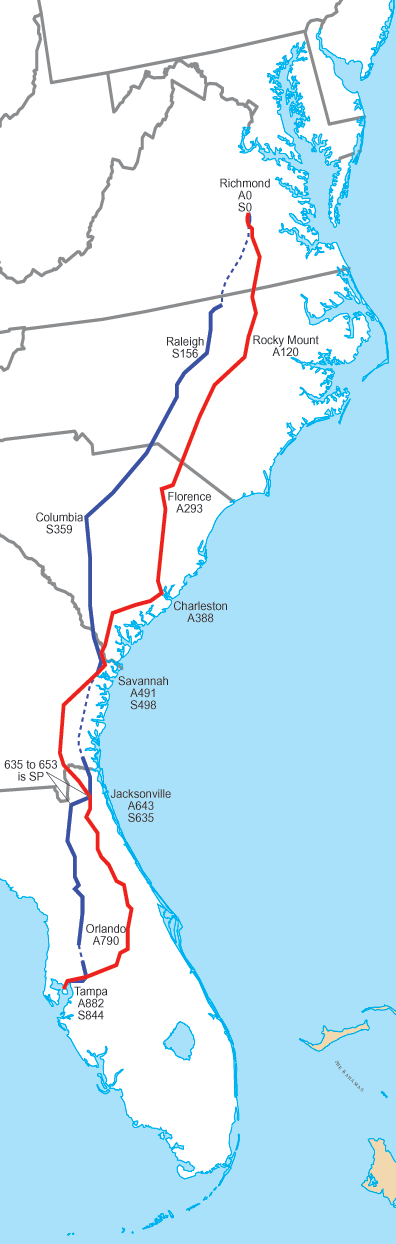
CSX's main "A" (red) and "S" (blue) lines. Note the removed track between Centralia, Virginia and Norlina, North Carolina, indicated by the dashed line.

The S-line also provides a more direct route for trains between Raleigh and the Northeast via Richmond. Since the abandonment of part of the S-line, Amtrak trains traveling north of Raleigh use the A-line and the North Carolina Railroad between Raleigh and Selma. (The A-line does not pass through Raleigh, instead running roughly parallel to Interstate 95 through Rocky Mount, Wilson, and Fayetteville.) The new S-line route will include station stops at Norlina, North Carolina, Henderson, North Carolina and Wake Forest, North Carolina.

The proposed project does not include electrification of the railway, unlike in the Northeast Corridor. However, top speeds would be raised from 79 to 110 miles per hour (127 to 177 km/h), resulting in an average speed of 85–87 mph (137–140 km/h). Travel time currently between Richmond and Raleigh on the Carolinian and Silver Star is close to four hours, but full implementation as proposed would reduce this to nearly two hours. The proposed two hours in time savings is nearly evenly split between the shorter distance provided by the more direct S-line routing and speed increases.

The overall project cost for fully restoring and improving the S-line, including the curve straightening and new bridges necessary to raise top speeds to 110 mph (180 km/h), has been estimated at $4 billion. In response, the North Carolina-Virginia Interstate High-Speed Rail Compact Commission has proposed investigating a staged effort that would first restore the S-line to its 79 mph (127 km/h) max speed state from the 1980s and pursue other improvements only after service was restored. This would have the benefit of reducing the travel time between Richmond and Raleigh by nearly one hour for a much lower startup cost, though it may somewhat increase the cost of performing the later improvements. The Silver Star would also travel over a restored S-line, as it did before 1986, and would also see the improvement in travel time.

As part of Atlantic Gateway, Virginia sought to take control of the abandoned S-Line right-of-way between Petersburg and the North Carolina border. In late 2019, negotiations were concluded and CSX, Virginia, and North Carolina reached separate deals that called for the two states to acquire the portions of the S-Line within their respective boundaries. Virginia will acquire 65 miles (105 km) of the S-Line between the North Carolina-Virginia line and Petersburg, while North Carolina will acquire 10 miles (16 km) of the line between Ridgeway and the North Carolina-Virginia line. North Carolina officials said that the Virginia deal will boost their efforts to acquire the remainder of the S-Line to Raleigh, which remains in light service as the Norlina Subdivision of CSX carrying some freight traffic. The North Carolina Department of Transportation (NCDOT) was awarded a $47.5 million federal grant in 2020 to purchase the line.

In early June 2022, a $58 million federal grant under the Consolidated Rail Infrastructure and Safety Improvements program to fund the initial engineering work necessary for rebuilding the S-Line between Raleigh and Richmond was announced. NCDOT projected a service begin on the route between 2025 and 2029.

On December 5, 2023, United States Secretary of Transportation Pete Buttigieg, U.S. Senator of North Carolina Thom Tillis, and Governor of North Carolina Roy Cooper announced the state will be receiving a $1 billion federal grant to develop the S-Line between Raleigh and Wake Forest for high-speed passenger rail service. On July 1, 2024, Buttigieg and Cooper, along with various state and local officials, participated in a groundbreaking ceremony for the project, marking the official start of construction.

=== Raleigh–Charlotte ===
The segment of the corridor between Raleigh and Charlotte travels along currently operational lines of the North Carolina Railroad (NCRR), roughly parallel to I-85. The portion of the route between Raleigh and Greensboro is over the H-line, while the Greensboro–Charlotte section travels along Norfolk Southern's main line. (While the lines are owned by the North Carolina Railroad, Norfolk Southern has an operational contract for trackage rights.) Both see current freight and passenger traffic (Amtrak's Carolinian and Piedmont), with freight traffic along the main line particularly heavy. However, double-tracking was removed from several sections of the Greensboro to Charlotte main line since its heyday, and significant signal upgrades, curve straightening, super-elevation, and restoration will be required to support high-speed passenger service along the corridor without interfering with freight operations.

NCDOT has worked with Norfolk Southern, CSX, and the NCRR to restore the double-tracking and make other incremental upgrades, a process that reduced the travel time between Raleigh and Charlotte by 35 minutes from 2001 to 2010. Additional work began in 2010 under the Piedmont Improvement Project (PIP), funded by a $520 million grant under the 2009 ARRA stimulus. The PIP projects included restoring complete double-track between Greensboro and Charlotte, adding passing sidings between Raleigh and Greensboro, straightening several curves, closing crossings, and building bridges to separate train and highway movements, all of which were completed by January 2018. The ARRA funds, along with funds from the city of Raleigh and NC DOT, also constructed Raleigh Union Station, a replacement train station located at the Boylan Wye intersection of the H-line and S-line. The station opened in July 2018 with a concourse and platform along the H-line only, but space is reserved for future construction of a northern concourse and platform along the S-line for future SEHSR trains.

=== Charlotte–Atlanta ===
Added to the SEHSR Corridor in 1998, a feasibility study was completed in August 2008 on the further extension from Charlotte through Spartanburg and Greenville, South Carolina to Atlanta and then Macon, Georgia. Further extensions to Savannah, Georgia, along with an extension from Raleigh through Columbia, South Carolina to Savannah and on to Jacksonville, Florida are also part of the federally designated SEHSR corridor, but those extensions have not yet been studied. All feasibility studies have suggested that synergy between parts of SEHSR and the neighboring Northeast Corridor is important. The Charlotte to Raleigh portion is predicted to be much more profitable with the corridor connected to D.C. and the Northeast Corridor. Similarly, the feasibility study found it much easier to justify the Charlotte to Atlanta and Macon route if the Charlotte to D.C. portion was completed. Atlanta is also the connecting point between SEHSR and federally designated Gulf Coast Corridor.

In May 2013, the Federal Railroad Administration (FRA), in cooperation with the Georgia Department of Transportation (GDOT), initiated a Tier I EIS for passenger rail service between Charlotte and Atlanta. During the scoping phase, the six possible routes from the feasibility study were reduced to the following three:

- Alternative 1: Southern Crescent

Using the existing Norfolk Southern right-of-way, coextensive with the middle leg of Amtrak's Crescent. The estimated 237-mile (381 km) route would have an estimated travel time of 4:35~5:34 hours, train speed between 79 mph (127 km/h) to 110 mph (177 km/h), with four round trips per day. The route has the lowest capital expenditure cost at $2 billion to $2.3 billion, but is also the least competitive compared to auto and air travel.

Potential stations would be at: Charlotte Gateway → Charlotte Airport → Gastonia → Spartanburg → Greenville → Clemson → Toccoa → Gainesville → Suwanee → Doraville → Atlanta MMPT → Atlanta Airport.

- Alternative 2: Interstate 85

Using the existing Interstate 85 right-of-way. The estimated 244-mile (393 km) route would have an estimated travel time of 2:42~2:50 hours, train speed between 125 mph (201 km/h) to 180 mph (290 km/h), with 14 round trips per day. The route has the highest capital expenditure cost at $13.3 billion to $15.4 billion, but would be competitive against auto travel.

Potential stations would be at: Charlotte Gateway → Charlotte Airport → Gastonia → Spartanburg → Greenville → Anderson → Commerce → Suwanee → Doraville → Atlanta MMPT → Atlanta Airport.

- Alternative 3: Greenfield

The Greenfield alternative is a dedicated-use alternative primarily on new right-of-way. The estimated 267-mile (430 km) route would have an estimated travel time of 2:06~2:44 hours, train speed between 125 mph (201 km/h) to 220 mph (354 km/h), with 16-22 round trips per day. The route would have a capital expenditure cost at $6.2 billion to $8.4 billion, but would be competitive against both auto and air travel, when access and security clearance times are included.

Potential stations would be at: Charlotte Gateway → Charlotte Airport → South Gastonia → Greenville–Spartanburg Airport → Anderson → Athens → Suwanee → Doraville → Atlanta MMPT → Atlanta Airport.

All three options would be able to substitute the Suwanee and Doraville stations with ones in Lawrenceville and Tucker in Georgia, should CSX right of way be used for the final approach into Atlanta rather than the Norfolk Southern right of way that the former two cities are located on.

The Tier I EIS was completed in September 2019, and in June 2021 the FRA and GDOT published a record of decision that identified the Greenfield corridor as the preferred alternative. Determination of a specific alignment, station locations, and service levels was deferred to the Tier II EIS. In December 2023, the Greenfield corridor was selected as part of the FRA's Corridor Identification and Development Program. It was granted up to $500,000 toward engineering and feasibility studies and is prioritized for future federal funding.

=== Atlanta and further south ===
There are three routes out of Atlanta being considered for high/higher speed rail. In 2012, during the study for the Tier I EIS, two main alternatives for higher speed rail have been considered. The first alternative is called Shared Use with top speeds of 90 mph (145 km/h) to 110 mph (177 km/h). The second alternative is called Hybrid High Performance with top speeds of 130 mph (209 km/h). There are also high-speed rail alternatives in the same study with top speeds of 180 mph (290 km/h) to 220 mph (354 km/h) or higher.

The three routes are:

- Atlanta – Macon – Jacksonville
- Atlanta – Chattanooga – Nashville – Louisville
- Atlanta – Birmingham

For the Louisville route, a feasibility study indicated that the high-speed trains for this link would be economically feasible. The stations along the route could include Cartersville and Dalton in Georgia; Chattanooga, Murfreesboro and Nashville in Tennessee; and Bowling Green and Elizabethtown in Kentucky. Although the Atlanta–Louisville high-speed rail link is not federally designated, the link will connect two federally designated corridors, SEHSR and Chicago Hub Network. The same route has been included in the US High Speed Rail Network of the US High Speed Rail Association, a non-profit advocacy group.

In June 2012, a feasibility study report presented to the State Transportation Board of Georgia indicated that a high-speed rail between Atlanta and Jacksonville would be economically feasible. Fares between Atlanta and Jacksonville would range between $119.41 and $152.24. The construction for that route would cost from $5 billion to $16 billion.

=== Western Virginia ===
Another proposed rail project, known as the Transdominion Express, would connect to SEHSR and extend from Richmond west to Lynchburg and from Washington, D.C. (Alexandria) south via an existing Virginia Railway Express route to Manassas, extending on south to Charlottesville, Lynchburg, Roanoke and Bristol on the Tennessee border.

== See also ==
- High-speed rail in the United States
