= Catbus (disambiguation) =

Catbus is a character in the film My Neighbor Totoro.

Catbus may also refer to:

- Capital Area Transit (Harrisburg), a public transportation agency in Harrisburg, Pennsylvania
- Capital Area Transit (Raleigh), a transit system in Raleigh, North Carolina
- Clemson Area Transit, a transit system in Clemson, South Carolina
- Perth Central Area Transit, a transit system in Perth, Western Australia

== See also ==
- Charlotte Area Transit System, a public transit authority in Charlotte, North Carolina
- Cottbus (disambiguation)
