= Laurel station (Mississippi) =

Train station in Laurel, Mississippi, US

Laurel, MS
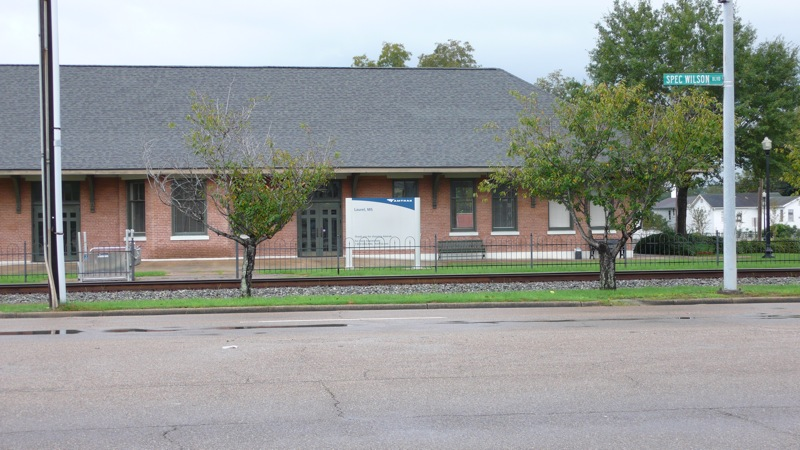

General information
- Location: 230 North Maple Street; Laurel, Mississippi; United States
- Coordinates: 31.6922°N 89.1280°W
- Line: Norfolk Southern Railway
- Platforms: 1 side platform
- Tracks: 1

Other information
- Status: Flag stop; unstaffed
- Station code: Amtrak: LAU

History
- Opened: 1913

Passengers
- FY 2025: 6,282 (Amtrak)

Services
Preceding station	Amtrak	Following station
Hattiesburg toward New Orleans	Crescent	Meridian toward New York
Former services
Preceding station	Southern Railway	Following station
Ellisville toward New Orleans	New Orleans – Cincinnati	Hawkes toward Cincinnati
- New Orleans and Northeastern Railroad Depot
- U.S. National Register of Historic Places
- Location: Maple St., Laurel, Mississippi
- Coordinates: 31°41′32″N 89°7′39″W
- Area: 2.3 acres (0.9 ha)
- Built: 1913
- Architectural style: Bungalow/craftsman
- NRHP reference No.: 95001192
- Added to NRHP: October 31, 1995
Location

Laurel station is an Amtrak station at 230 North Maple Street in the heart of downtown Laurel, Mississippi. Currently served by Amtrak's Crescent passenger train, the station was originally built in 1913 by the New Orleans and Northeastern Railroad, which was acquired in 1916 by the Southern Railway.

The station is a Mississippi Landmark and has been listed on the National Register of Historic Places since October 31, 1995.

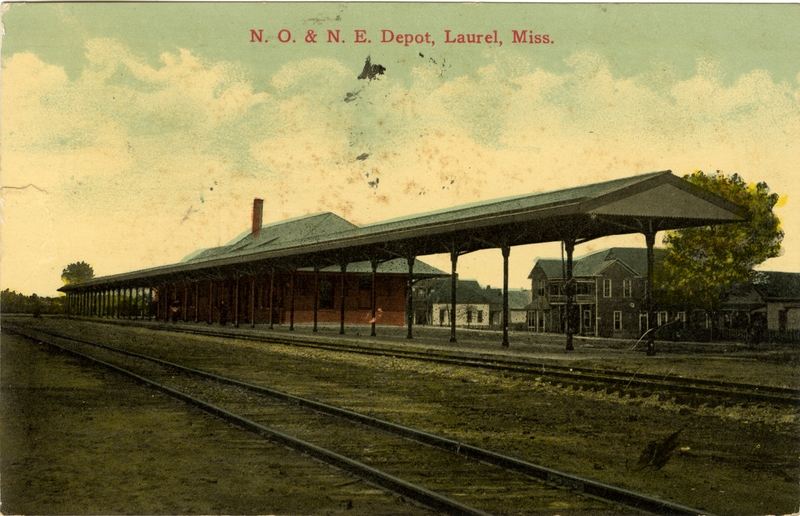
Station postcard from early 1900s
