= CrimsonRide =

Bus service

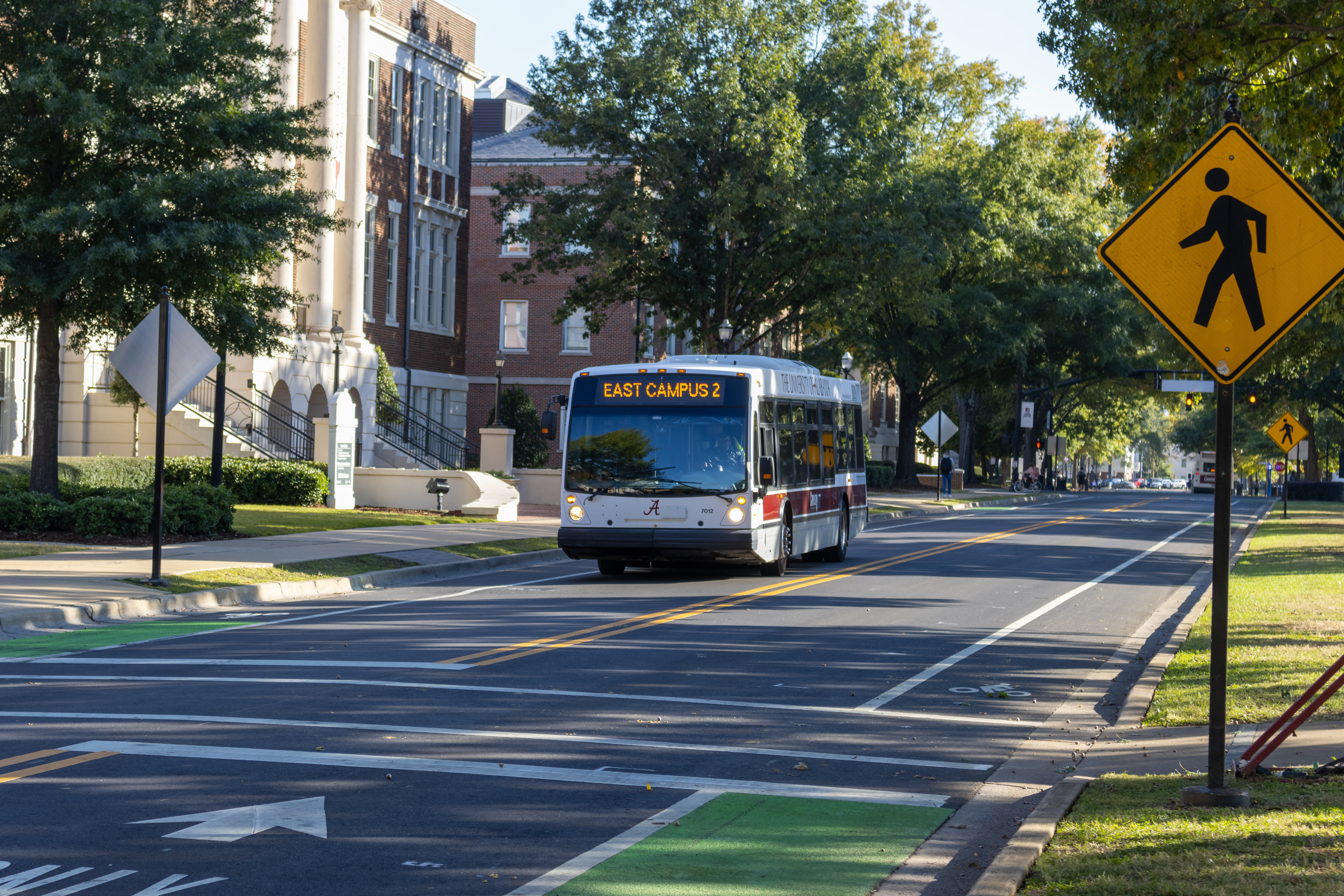
- Founded: 2007
- Headquarters: Tuscaloosa, Alabama
- Locale: University of Alabama
- Service area: University of Alabama campus
- Service type: Campus shuttle bus service
- Fleet: 17 (2008)
- Daily ridership: 13,510 (weekday)
- Operator: First Transit
- Website: http://crimsonride.ua.edu

The CrimsonRide is an area bus service serving the students, staff, faculty, and general public on and around the University of Alabama's campus in Tuscaloosa, Alabama. The CrimsonRide is operated by First Transit, under contract with UA's Department of Transportation Services, and commenced operation on August 11, 2007. The CrimsonRide replaced the previous Blue & Yellow Routes operated by the Tuscaloosa Transit Authority as the public transit option for students, staff, faculty, and general public on the UA campus.

The system consists of 17, 40-foot (12 m) long Nova LFS buses with 41 stops. The buses run as early as 7 a.m. until as late as 4 a.m. with 15 being used at peak hours and 8 being used at non-peak times. The buses run at 5-minute intervals on the academic routes in the central portion of campus and at 20-minute intervals on the perimeter of the campus. Each bus is also equipped with a TransLoc GPS monitor allowing for the status of each bus to be monitored by users in real time.

== History ==
The development of an on-campus shuttle system was initially offered as a serious proposal in Fall 2005 with an initial opening date set in August 2006, but by Winter 2006, university officials announced the system would be operational by August 2007. In June 2006, the UA Board of Trustees approved the budget of $1.8 million for the proposed transit system. The funding for the system project was paid with a $1.5 million federal transportation appropriations grant and supplemented with an additional $375,000 generated from parking fees.

Paying tribute to the Crimson Tide nickname, the moniker CrimsonRide was selected by students voting in the 2006 Homecoming elections over the second place name of Tide Transit. With the start of the bus system, several roads throughout campus were closed to vehicular traffic in becoming solely bus and bicycle lanes. The most notable of the road closures are located around the Quad. The system would open in June 2007 in a test mode, with the official opening occurring on August 11, 2007.

After its first semester in operation, the system saw an average ridership of 13,510 passengers per day. The CrimsonRide served its 2 millionth passenger, Ciara Prater, at the beginning of its second year of service on August 25, 2008.

== Routes ==
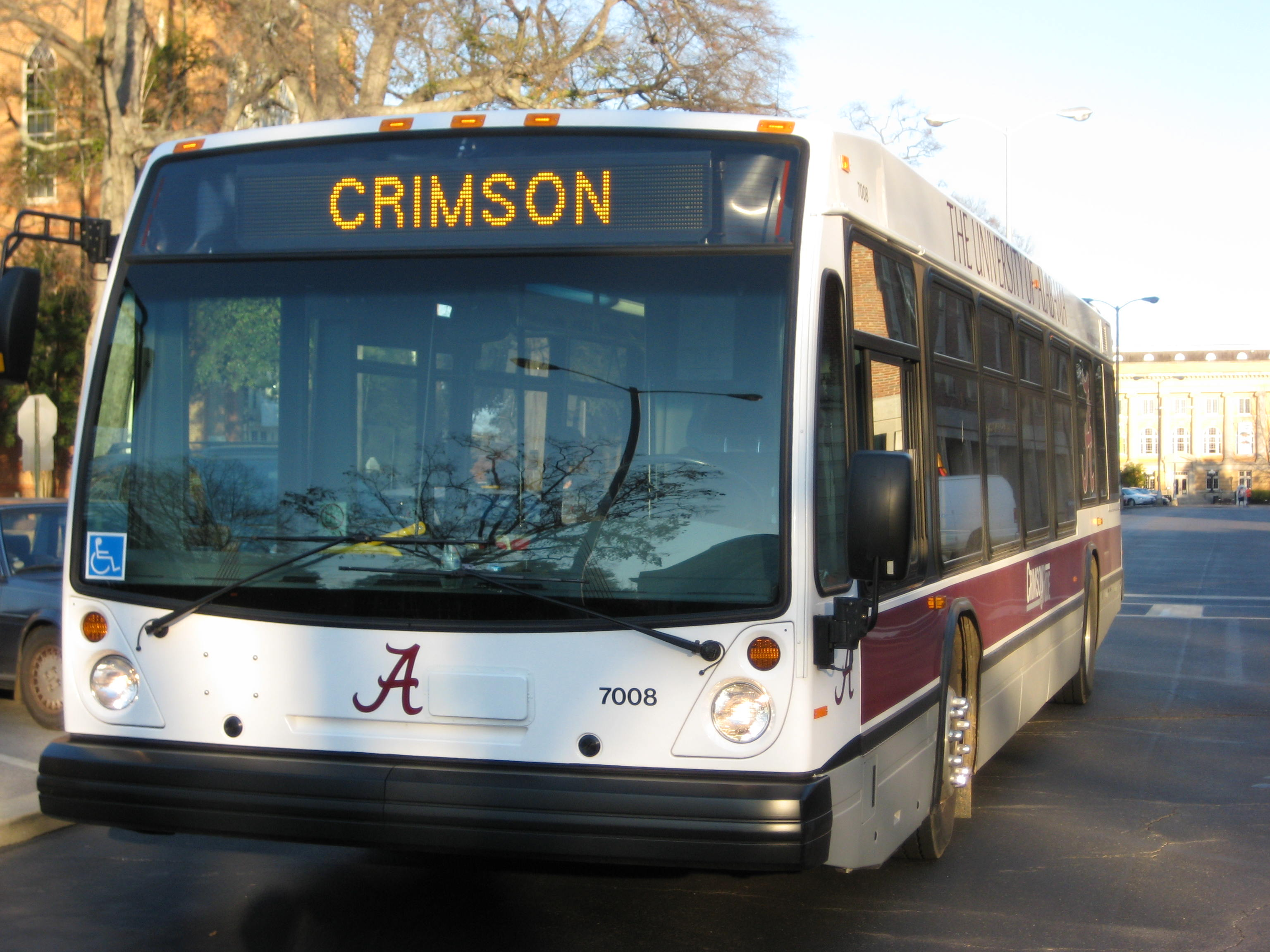
Front view of a CrimsonRide bus, running the Crimson route.

The CrimsonRide operates eight routes during the weekdays and a singular, comprehensive system on the weekends.

== See also ==
- List of bus transit systems in the United States
- Tuscaloosa Transit Authority
- Tuscaloosa station
