= Crescent (train) =

Amtrak service between New York and New Orleans

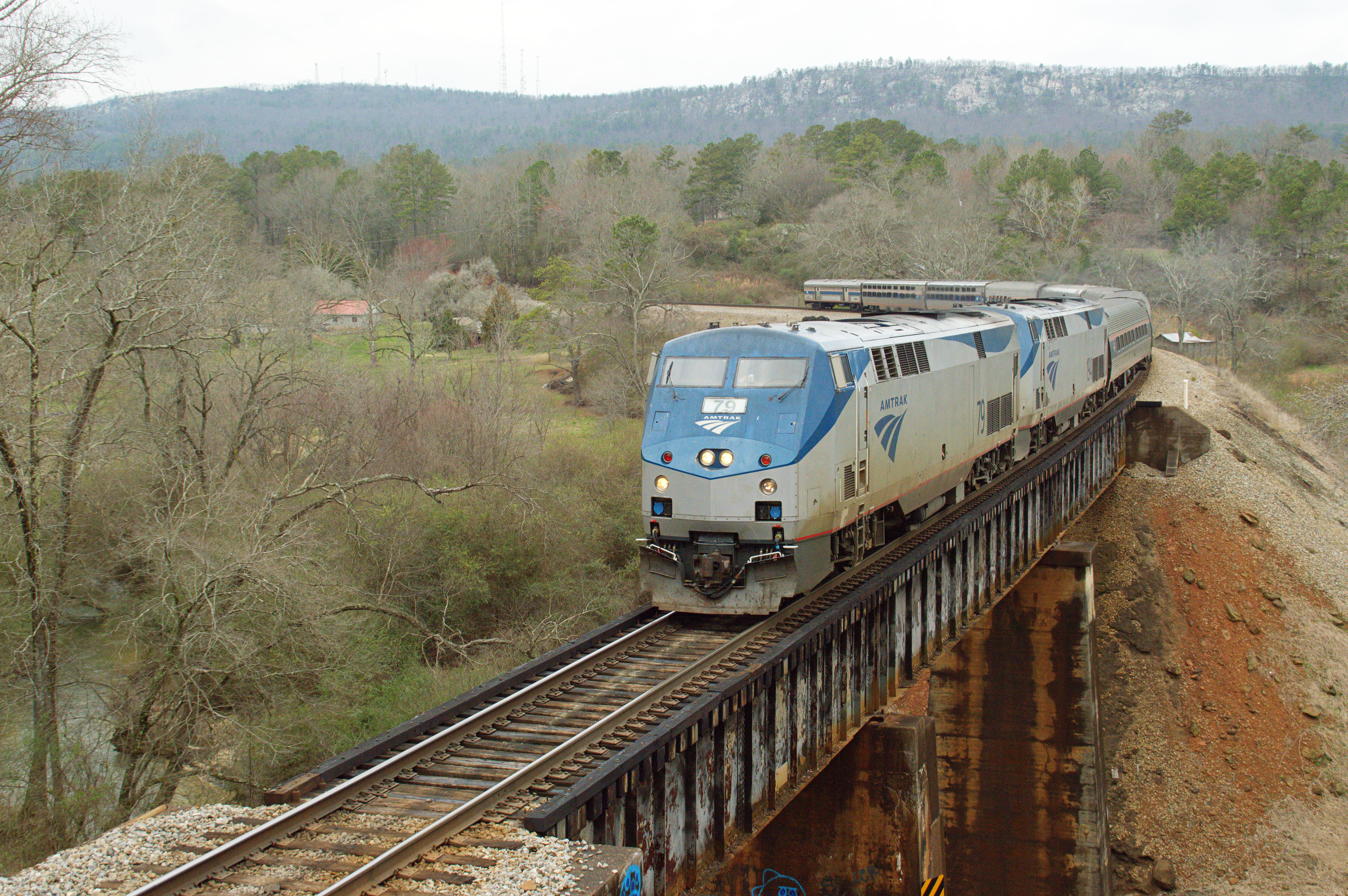
- The Crescent crossing a stream near Cooks Springs, Alabama, in March 2015

Overview
- Service type: Inter-city rail
- Locale: Eastern United States
- Current operator: Amtrak
- Former operator: Southern Railway (1970–1979)
- Annual ridership: 316,213 (FY 25) ▲4.3% (Note: Amtrak's Fiscal Year (FY) runs from October 1 of the prior year to September 30 of the named year.)

Route
- Termini: New York City, New York; New Orleans, Louisiana
- Stops: 33
- Distance travelled: 1,377 miles (2,216 km)
- Average journey time: 30 hours, 47 minutes (southbound); 32 hours, 36 minutes (northbound)
- Service frequency: Daily
- Train numbers: 19 (southbound); 20 (northbound)

On-board services
- Classes: Coach Class; First Class Sleeper Service
- Disabled access: All train cars, most stations
- Sleeping arrangements: Roomette (2 beds); Bedroom (2 beds); Bedroom Suite (4 beds); Accessible Bedroom (2 beds)
- Catering facilities: Dining car, Café
- Baggage facilities: Overhead racks, checked baggage available at selected stations

Technical
- Rolling stock: Amfleet · Viewliner
- Track gauge: 4 ft 8 1/2 in (1,435 mm) standard gauge
- Operating speed: 43.4 mph (69.8 km/h) (avg.); 125 mph (201 km/h) (top)
- Track owners: Amtrak, CSX, NS

The Crescent is a daily long-distance passenger train operated by Amtrak between New York City and New Orleans (the "Crescent City"). The 1,377-mile (2,216 km) route connects the Northeast to the Gulf Coast via the Appalachian Piedmont, with major stops in Charlotte, North Carolina; Atlanta, Georgia; and Birmingham, Alabama.

Most of the route of the Crescent is on the Norfolk Southern Railway. It is the successor to the Southern Crescent, introduced in 1970 by Norfolk Southern's predecessor, the Southern Railway.

== History ==
=== Southerner ===
Today's Crescent is a direct descendant of the Southerner, a streamlined passenger train operated by the Southern Railway from 1941 to 1970. The daily train followed essentially the same route as the modern Crescent, providing sleeper service between New York and New Orleans via Washington, Atlanta, and Birmingham.

=== Southern Crescent ===
Since its inception, the sister train of the Southerner was a second New York–New Orleans sleeper, the Southern Railway's Crescent. The two trains shared generally the same route between New York and Atlanta but diverged between Atlanta and New Orleans. The Crescent took a more coastal route, operating via Mobile and Montgomery over Atlanta and West Point Railroad, Western Railway of Alabama, and Louisville & Nashville Railroad trackage. The Southerner stayed inland to run exclusively on Southern Railway trackage through Birmingham.

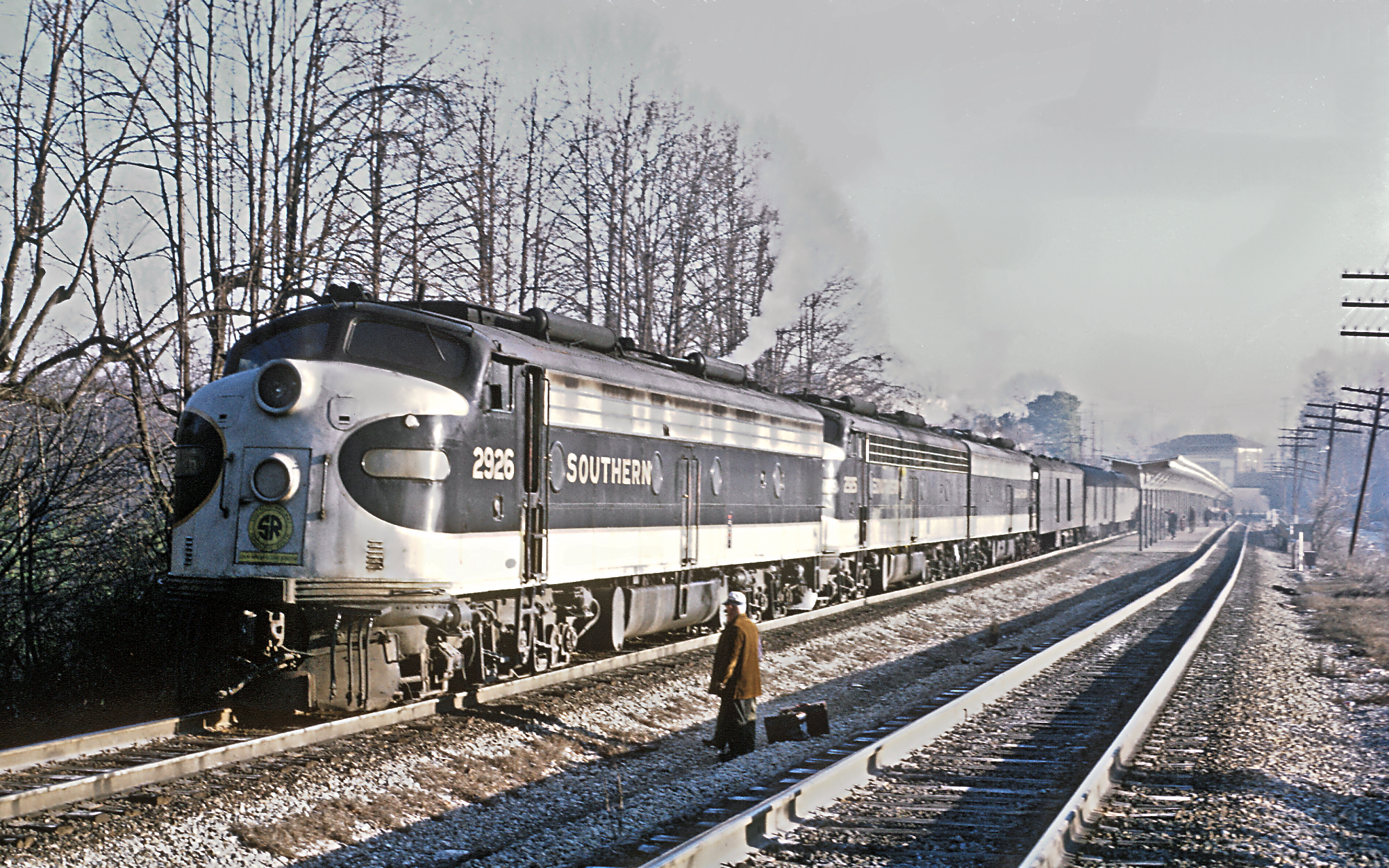
Southern Railway's Southern Crescent at Peachtree station on January 21, 1971

In 1970, amid a push by its partners to discontinue passenger operations, the Southern Railway merged the Southerner and the Crescent into one service: the Southern Crescent. The new train used the route of the Southerner, operating via Birmingham instead of Mobile. Although the Birmingham route was slightly longer, it was fully owned by the Southern Railway and therefore more reliable. The Southern Crescent was numbered 1 southbound and 2 northbound. Penn Central carried it between Washington and New York along the Northeast Corridor, inheriting the longstanding haulage agreement from the Pennsylvania Railroad.

For most of the 1970s, the Southern Crescent was supplemented by the Piedmont, a former New York–New Orleans train that had been cut back to a regional Atlanta–Washington (later Charlotte–Washington and Salisbury–Washington) service running along the middle leg of the Southern Crescent route.

Amtrak took over most inter-city passenger trains in the United States on May 1, 1971, but the Southern Railway initially opted out. Amtrak did inherit most of Penn Central's passenger services, including the haulage agreement for the Southern Crescent. For a portion of the mid-1970s, the Southern Crescent only operated tri-weekly between Atlanta and New Orleans, and carried a run-through Amtrak 10-6 sleeper on those days to connect to the Sunset Limited. On occasion, when the Southern deemed an Amtrak car to be short of its standards, it substituted a Southern sleeper in the consist. Additionally, one of the two dome coaches in the Southern car fleet was added for the leg south of Atlanta.

The Southern Crescent was one of the last two privately operated long-distance passenger services in the United States, the other being the Rio Grande Zephyr. However, mounting revenue losses and equipment-replacement expenses forced Southern Railway to leave the passenger business.

=== Amtrak era ===
The Southern Railway turned over full operation of the Southern Crescent to Amtrak on February 1, 1979. Amtrak simplified the name to the Crescent and renumbered it 19 southbound and 20 northbound, though for several years the Southern assigned it operating numbers 819 and 820. The train began using rebuilt Heritage Fleet equipment in 1981.

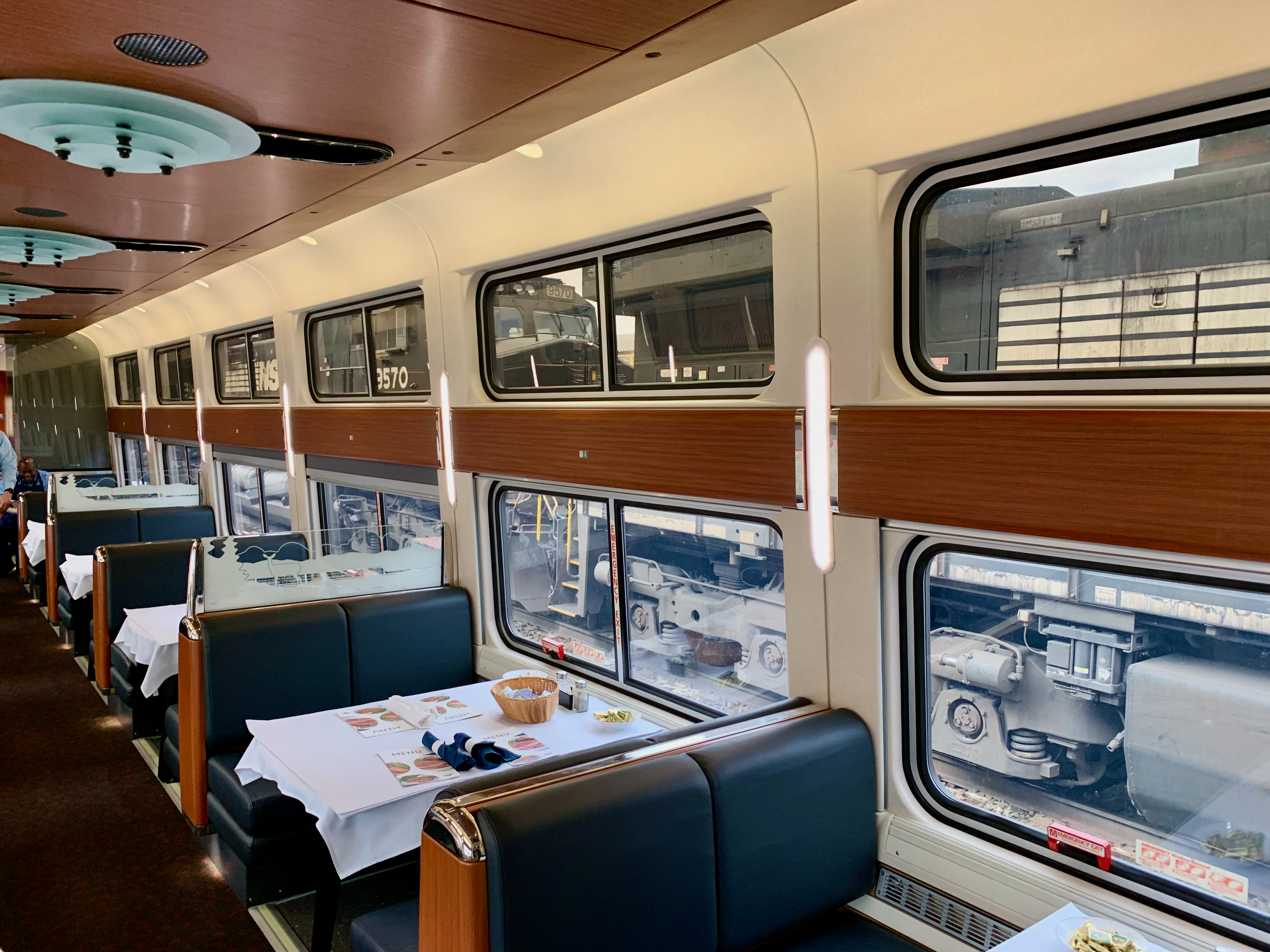
The Amtrak Crescent dining car in 2019

On October 28, 1989, Amtrak added a section of the Crescent between Birmingham and Mobile, Alabama, known as the Gulf Breeze. It ran until April 1, 1995, when it was cancelled due to budget issues. A replacement Amtrak Thruway bus ran until October 16, 1997. The Atlanta–New Orleans portion of the Crescent was reduced to tri-weekly operation from April 2, 1995, to November 11, 1996 (quad-weekly from November 1995 to February 1996).

When Hurricane Katrina struck Louisiana, Mississippi, and Alabama in August 2005, the Crescent was temporarily truncated to Atlanta. Service was restored first as far as Meridian, Mississippi, while Norfolk Southern crews worked to repair the damage to their lines serving the Gulf Coast. Amtrak restored Crescent and City of New Orleans service to New Orleans on October 9, 2005.

From July 10 to September 1, 2017, the train terminated at Washington, D.C. instead of New York City due to track work at Penn Station. Starting October 1, 2019, traditional dining car services were removed and replaced with a reduced menu of 'Flexible Dining' options. As a result, the dining car serves as a lounge car for use exclusively by sleeping car passengers.

=== Proposed expansion ===
As part of Amtrak's Network Growth Strategy (NGS), adding a section from Meridian, Mississippi to Fort Worth, Texas has been discussed since the early 2000s, with the route supposed to be up and running by 2002. The plan fell through when Amtrak abandoned the NGS. However, in March 2023, Amtrak announced that it is seeking federal funding to once again study this proposal. Due to Kansas City Southern Railway's (KCS) continued opposition to hosting this train on the Meridian Speedway, the study was dependent on a proposed merger between the KCS and Canadian Pacific Railway being approved by the United States Surface Transportation Board. This merger was approved on March 15, 2023, and officially went into effect on April 14, 2023, allowing this proposal to move forward. In June 2023, Amtrak applied for funding to begin the project to extend service from Mississippi to Texas along the I-20 corridor.

=== Federal lawsuit ===
In July 2024, the United States Department of Justice filed a lawsuit against Norfolk Southern Railway, alleging that they did not give priority to Amtrak's Crescent on about 1,140 miles of Norfolk Southern-owned tracks as required by federal law. According to the lawsuit and audits conducted by Amtrak, about one out of every four southbound Crescent services arrived at their destination on-time in 2023. A spokesman for Norfolk Southern said that delays on the route had been reduced in recent months and that they were "committed to complying with the law, working together, and honoring our commitments."

== Route ==
Route map of the Crescent

The tracks used were once part of the Pennsylvania Railroad; Richmond, Fredericksburg and Potomac Railroad; Southern Railway and North Carolina Railroad systems; they are now owned by Amtrak, CSX Transportation, and Norfolk Southern Railway, respectively. The following lines are used:

- New York City to Washington, D.C.: Northeast Corridor, ex-Pennsylvania Railroad, now Amtrak
- Washington to Alexandria, Virginia: Richmond, Fredericksburg and Potomac Railroad, now CSX
- Alexandria to Danville, Virginia: Virginia Midland Railway (ex-Southern Railway), now Norfolk Southern
- Danville to Greensboro, North Carolina: Piedmont Air-Line Railway (ex-Southern Railway), now NS
- Greensboro to Charlotte, North Carolina: North Carolina Railroad (formerly leased by Southern Railway), track managed by NS
- Charlotte to Atlanta, Georgia: Atlanta and Charlotte Air-Line Railway (ex-Southern Railway), now NS
- Atlanta to Birmingham, Alabama: Georgia Pacific Railway (ex-Southern Railway), now NS
- Station and adjacent tracks in Birmingham: Louisville and Nashville Railroad, now CSX
- Birmingham to Meridian, Mississippi: Alabama Great Southern Railroad (ex-Southern Railway), now NS
- Meridian to New Orleans, Louisiana: New Orleans and Northeastern Railroad (ex-Southern Railway), now NS

== Rolling stock ==
As of 2024, a usual consist on the Crescent included:

- 2 GE P42DC or Siemens ALC-42 diesel locomotives (1 Siemens ACS-64 electric locomotive north of Washington, D.C.)
- 3 Amfleet II coaches
- 1 Amfleet II café car
- 2 Viewliner sleeping cars
- 1 Viewliner II baggage-dorm
- 1 Viewliner II diner

By March 2025, the train only had one sleeping car, but the second was planned to be re-added in May 2025. Amtrak plans to replace the Amfleet cars with new long-distance cars by 2032.

== Station stops ==
State	Town/city	Station	Connections
New York	New York City	New York Penn Station	Amtrak (long-distance): Cardinal, Lake Shore Limited, Palmetto, Silver Meteor; Amtrak (intercity): Acela, Adirondack, Berkshire Flyer, Carolinian, Empire Service, Ethan Allen Express, Keystone Service, Maple Leaf, Northeast Regional, Pennsylvanian, Vermonter; LIRR: ■ City Terminal Zone, ■ Port Washington Branch; NJ Transit: ■ North Jersey Coast Line, ■ Northeast Corridor Line, ■ Gladstone Branch, ■ Montclair–Boonton Line, ■ Morristown Line; NYC Subway: PATH: HOB-33 JSQ-33 JSQ-33 (via HOB); NYC Transit Bus
New Jersey	Newark	Newark Penn Station	Amtrak: Acela, Carolinian, Cardinal, Keystone Service, Northeast Regional, Pennsylvanian, Silver Meteor, Vermonter; NJ Transit: ■ North Jersey Coast Line, ■ Northeast Corridor Line, ■ Raritan Valley Line; PATH: NWK-WTC; Newark Light Rail; NJ Transit Bus
New Jersey	Iselin	Metropark	Amtrak: Acela, Carolinian, Keystone Service, Northeast Regional, Palmetto, Vermonter; NJ Transit Rail: ■ Northeast Corridor Line; Local bus: NJ Transit Bus
New Jersey	Trenton	Trenton	Amtrak: Carolinian, Cardinal, Keystone Service, Northeast Regional, Pennsylvanian, Silver Meteor, Vermonter; NJ Transit: ■ Northeast Corridor Line, ■ River Line; SEPTA Regional Rail: ■ Trenton Line; NJ Transit Bus, SEPTA Suburban Bus
Pennsylvania	Philadelphia	30th Street Station	Amtrak: Acela, Carolinian, Cardinal, Keystone Service, Northeast Regional, Palmetto, Pennsylvanian, Silver Meteor, Vermonter; SEPTA Regional Rail: all routes NJ Transit: ■ Atlantic City Line; SEPTA Metro: SEPTA City Bus, SEPTA Suburban Bus
Delaware	Wilmington	Wilmington	Amtrak: Acela, Carolinian, Cardinal, Palmetto, Northeast Regional, Silver Meteor, Vermonter; SEPTA Regional Rail: ■ Wilmington/Newark Line; DART First State; Greyhound Lines
Maryland	Baltimore	Baltimore	Amtrak: Acela, Carolinian, Cardinal, Palmetto, Northeast Regional, Silver Meteor, Vermonter; MARC: ■ Penn Line; Light RailLink; MTA Maryland, Charm City Circulator
Maryland	Hanover	BWI Airport	Amtrak: Acela, Carolinian, Northeast Regional, Palmetto, Vermonter; MARC: ■ Penn Line; Shuttle to Baltimore/Washington International Airport; MTA Maryland, UMBC Transit
District of Columbia	Washington	Washington; Union Station	Amtrak: Acela, Carolinian, Cardinal, Floridian, Palmetto, Northeast Regional, Silver Meteor, Vermonter; MARC: ■ Brunswick Line, ■ Camden Line, ■ Penn Line; VRE: ■ Manassas Line, ■ Fredericksburg Line; Metro: Red Line; Metrobus, MTA Maryland, Loudoun County Transit, OmniRide; Intercity bus: Greyhound, Megabus, BestBus, Peter Pan, OurBus
Virginia	Alexandria	Alexandria	Amtrak: Carolinian, Cardinal, Floridian, Northeast Regional, Silver Meteor; VRE: ■ Fredericksburg Line, ■ Manassas Line; Metro: Blue Line, Yellow Line; Metrobus, DASH
Virginia	Manassas	Manassas	Amtrak: Cardinal, Northeast Regional; VRE: ■ Manassas Line; PRTC
Virginia	Culpeper	Culpeper	Amtrak: Cardinal, Northeast Regional
Virginia	Charlottesville	Charlottesville	Amtrak: Cardinal, Northeast Regional, Amtrak Thruway to Richmond, Washington, D.C. Charlottesville Area Transit; Greyhound Lines
Virginia	Lynchburg	Lynchburg	Amtrak: Northeast Regional; Greater Lynchburg Transit Company; Greyhound Lines
Virginia	Danville	Danville	
North Carolina	Greensboro	Greensboro	Amtrak: Carolinian, Piedmont; Greensboro Transit Authority, Piedmont Authority for Regional Transportation; Greyhound Lines
North Carolina	High Point	High Point	Amtrak: Carolinian, Piedmont, Amtrak Thruway to Winston-Salem, North Carolina; Piedmont Authority for Regional Transportation
North Carolina	Salisbury	Salisbury	Amtrak: Carolinian, Piedmont
North Carolina	Charlotte	Charlotte	Amtrak: Carolinian, Piedmont; Charlotte Area Transit System
North Carolina	Gastonia	Gastonia	
South Carolina	Spartanburg	Spartanburg	
South Carolina	Greenville	Greenville	Greenlink
South Carolina	Clemson	Clemson	Clemson Area Transit
Georgia	Toccoa	Toccoa	
Georgia	Gainesville	Gainesville	Red Rabbit Bus
Georgia	Atlanta	Peachtree	MARTA Bus
Alabama	Anniston	Anniston	ACTS; Greyhound
Alabama	Birmingham	Birmingham	BJCTA MAX Bus; Greyhound
Alabama	Tuscaloosa	Tuscaloosa	Tuscaloosa Transit Authority
Mississippi	Meridian	Meridian Union Station	Greyhound
Mississippi	Laurel	Laurel	
Mississippi	Hattiesburg	Hattiesburg	Hub City Transit
Mississippi	Picayune	Picayune	
Louisiana	Slidell	Slidell	
Louisiana	New Orleans	New Orleans; Union Passenger Terminal	Amtrak: City of New Orleans, Mardi Gras Service, Sunset Limited; Streetcar: 46 Rampart–Loyola; RTA Bus; Greyhound

== Bibliography ==
- Murray, Tom (2007). Southern Railway (1st ed.). Voyager Press. ISBN 978-0-7603-2545-2.
