= Clemson station =

Train station in Clemson, South Carolina

Clemson, SC
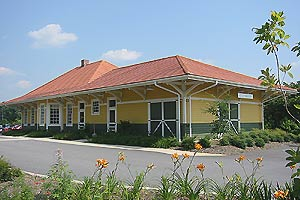
- Station building, built in 1916 and moved back from the right-of-way in 2001

General information
- Location: 1105 Tiger Boulevard; Clemson, South Carolina; United States
- Coordinates: 34.6910°N 82.8325°W
- Owner: City of Clemson
- Line: Greenville District
- Platforms: 1 side platform
- Tracks: 1
- Connections: Clemson Area Transit

Construction
- Structure type: At-grade
- Parking: Yes; free

Other information
- Status: Unstaffed
- Station code: Amtrak: CSN

History
- Opened: 1916
- Former names: Calhoun
- Original company: Southern Railway

Passengers
- FY 2025: 4,416 (Amtrak)

Services
Preceding station	Amtrak	Following station
Toccoa toward New Orleans	Crescent	Greenville toward New York
Former services
Preceding station	Southern Railway	Following station
Courtenay toward Birmingham	Main Line	Central toward Washington, D.C.
Location

Clemson station is a train station in Clemson, South Carolina. It is served by the Crescent passenger train of Amtrak, the national passenger rail service. The station sits on the corner of Calhoun Memorial Highway and College Avenue in the heart of downtown Clemson. Clemson is situated on one of the nation's emerging high-speed rail corridors, known as the Southeast High Speed Rail Corridor or SEHSR.

The station was originally erected by the Southern Railway in 1916. In the early 1960s, R.C. Edwards, then Clemson University president, convinced D.W. Brosnan, president of the Southern at the time, to prefer Clemson over Seneca as the main station for the area. On January 31, 1979, the Southern discontinued passenger service, turning operations of the Crescent over to Amtrak. In 2016 the station closed for construction on a nearby intersection. An Amtrak Thruway bus transferred Clemson passengers to Greenville.

Amtrak's Crescent resumed normal service at Clemson station on August 1, 2019.
