= Picayune station =

Train station in Picayune, Mississippi, US

Picayune, MS
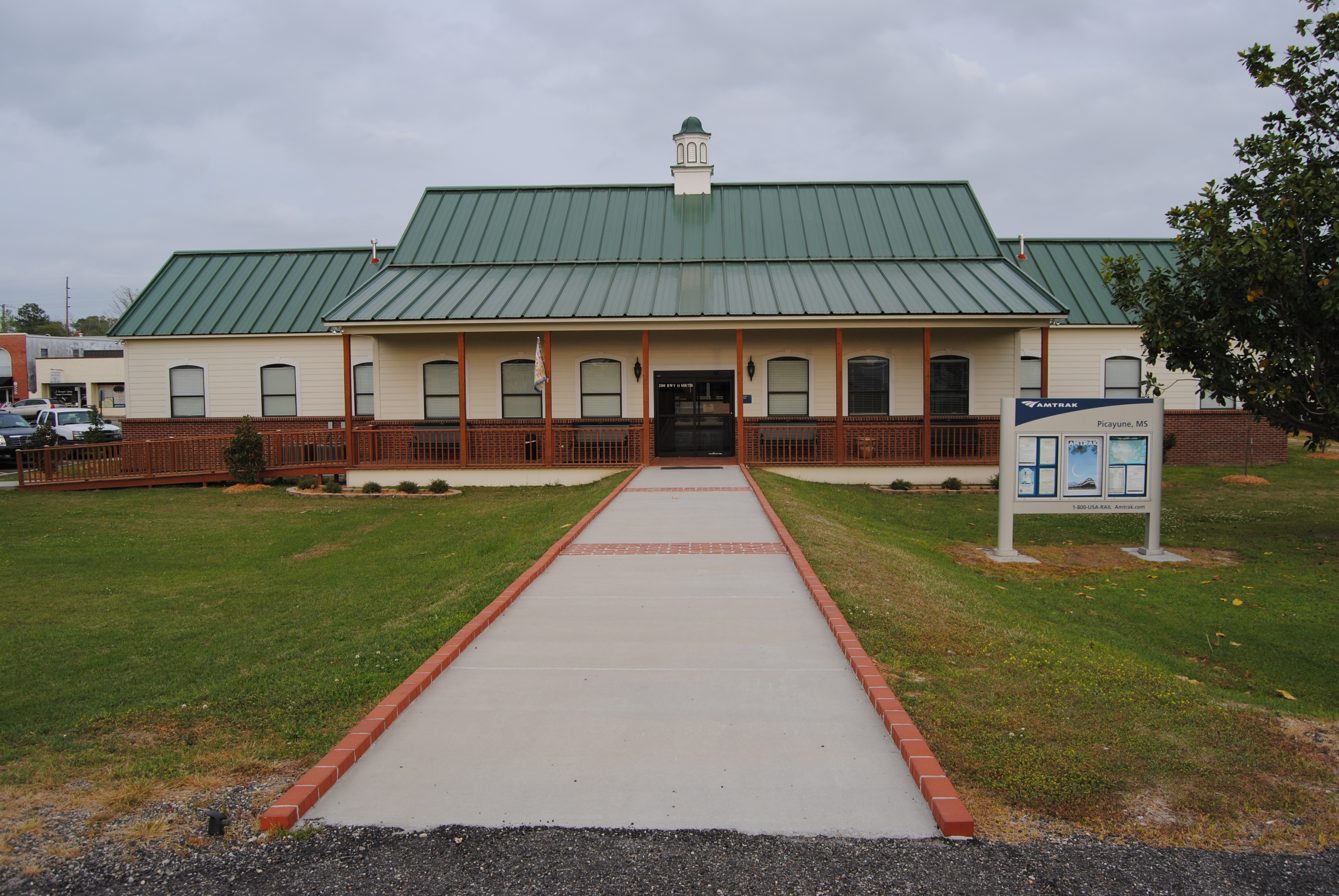

General information
- Location: 200 South Highway 11; Picayune, Mississippi; United States
- Coordinates: 30.5244°N 89.6804°W
- Owner: City of Picayune
- Line: Norfolk Southern Railway
- Platforms: 1 side platform
- Tracks: 2

Other information
- Status: Flag stop; unstaffed
- Station code: Amtrak: PIC

History
- Rebuilt: 2008

Passengers
- FY 2025: 2,507 (Amtrak)

Services
Preceding station	Amtrak	Following station
Slidell toward New Orleans	Crescent	Hattiesburg toward New York
Former services
Preceding station	Southern Railway	Following station
Nicholson toward New Orleans	New Orleans – Cincinnati	Richardson toward Cincinnati
Location

Picayune is an Amtrak intercity train station at 200 South Highway 11, in the heart of downtown Picayune, Mississippi. The station is served by Amtrak's Crescent passenger train. The station house was built in 2008 as a replacement for an open covered shelter. Like its predecessor, however, it is a flag stop, and only stops here when passengers have tickets either to or from the station.

Picayune is one of five Amtrak stations servicing the Mississippi Gulf Coast, alongside Bay St. Louis, Gulfport, Biloxi, and Pascagoula on the Mardi Gras Service.
