= Slidell station =

Train station in Slidell, Louisiana, US

Slidell, LA
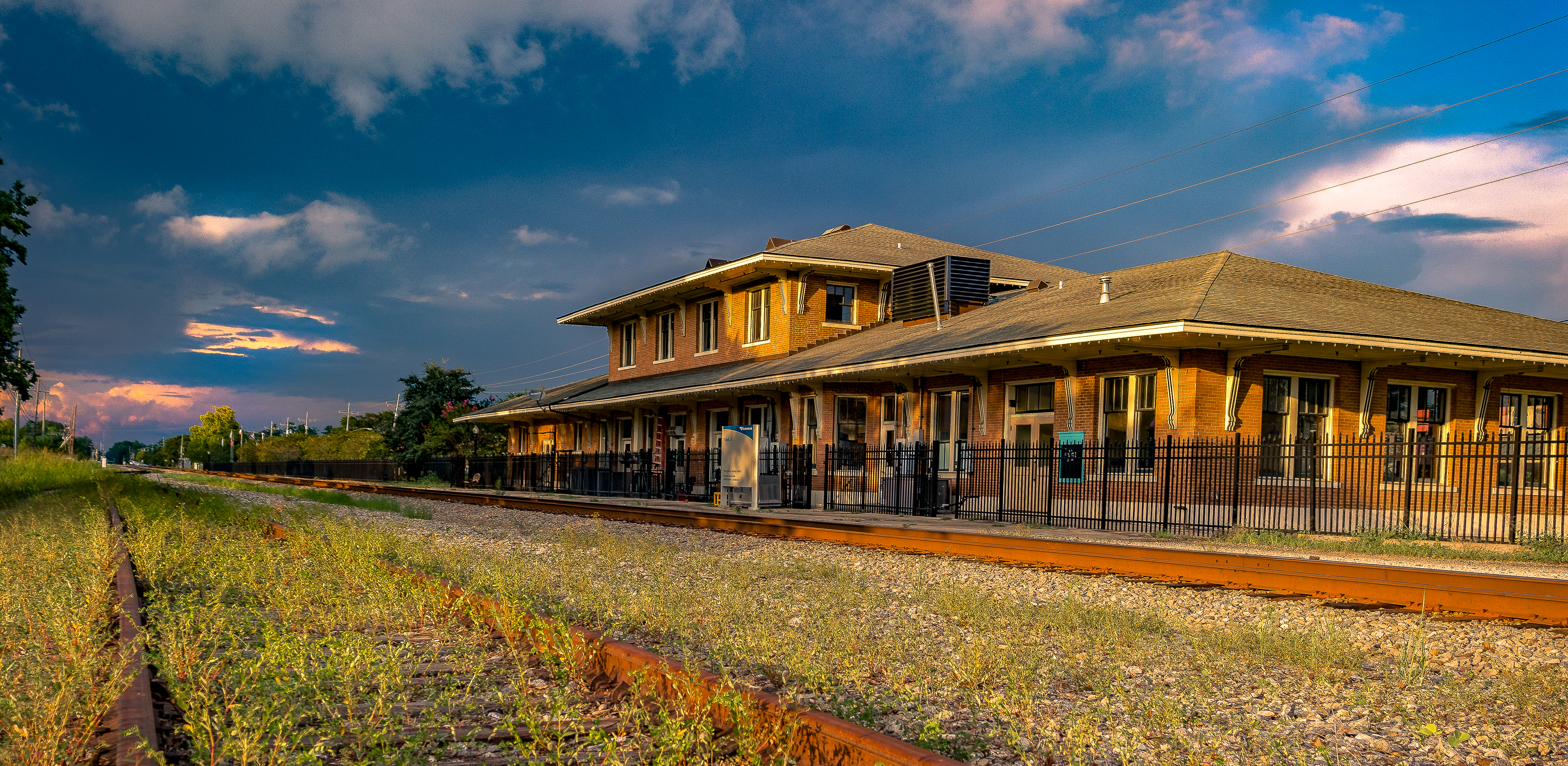
- Slidell station in 2016, with the platform in the foreground.

General information
- Location: 1827 Front Street; Slidell, Louisiana; United States
- Coordinates: 30°16′42″N 89°46′58″W
- Owner: City of Slidell
- Line: Norfolk Southern Railway
- Platforms: 1 side platform
- Tracks: 2

Construction
- Parking: 12 long and 12 short term spaces
- Accessible: Yes

Other information
- Status: Flag stop; unstaffed
- Station code: Amtrak: SDL

History
- Opened: 1913

Passengers
- FY 2025: 6,682 (Amtrak)

Services
| Preceding station | Amtrak | Following station |
|---|---|---|
| New Orleans Terminus | Crescent | Picayune toward New York |
Former services
| Preceding station | Southern Railway | Following station |
|---|---|---|
| North Shore toward New Orleans | New Orleans – Cincinnati | Pearl River toward Cincinnati |
- New Orleans and Northeastern—New Orleans and Great Northern Railroad Depot
- U.S. National Register of Historic Places
- Area: less than one acre
- NRHP reference No.: 96001188
- Added to NRHP: October 24, 1996
Location

Slidell station is an Amtrak intercity train station in Slidell, Louisiana, served by the daily Crescent train. It was built in 1913 for the use of the New Orleans and Northeastern and the New Orleans Great Northern Railroads. Slidell was first established in 1881 as a construction camp for the NO&NE. The station is served by one daily Amtrak train.

The Norfolk Southern Railway, successor to the NO&NE, donated the depot to the city in 1996. It was substantially renovated with a grant from the Louisiana Department of Transportation and Development with funds received from the federal government under the Intermodal Surface Transportation Efficiency Act of 1991. It currently houses an art gallery, the Slidell Cultural Center, and an American-style hamburger restaurant named Times Grill.

It was added to the National Register of Historic Places in 1996 as New Orleans and Northeastern–New Orleans and Great Northern Railroad Depot.
