= Hattiesburg station =

Train station in Hattiesburg, Mississippi, US

Hattiesburg, MS
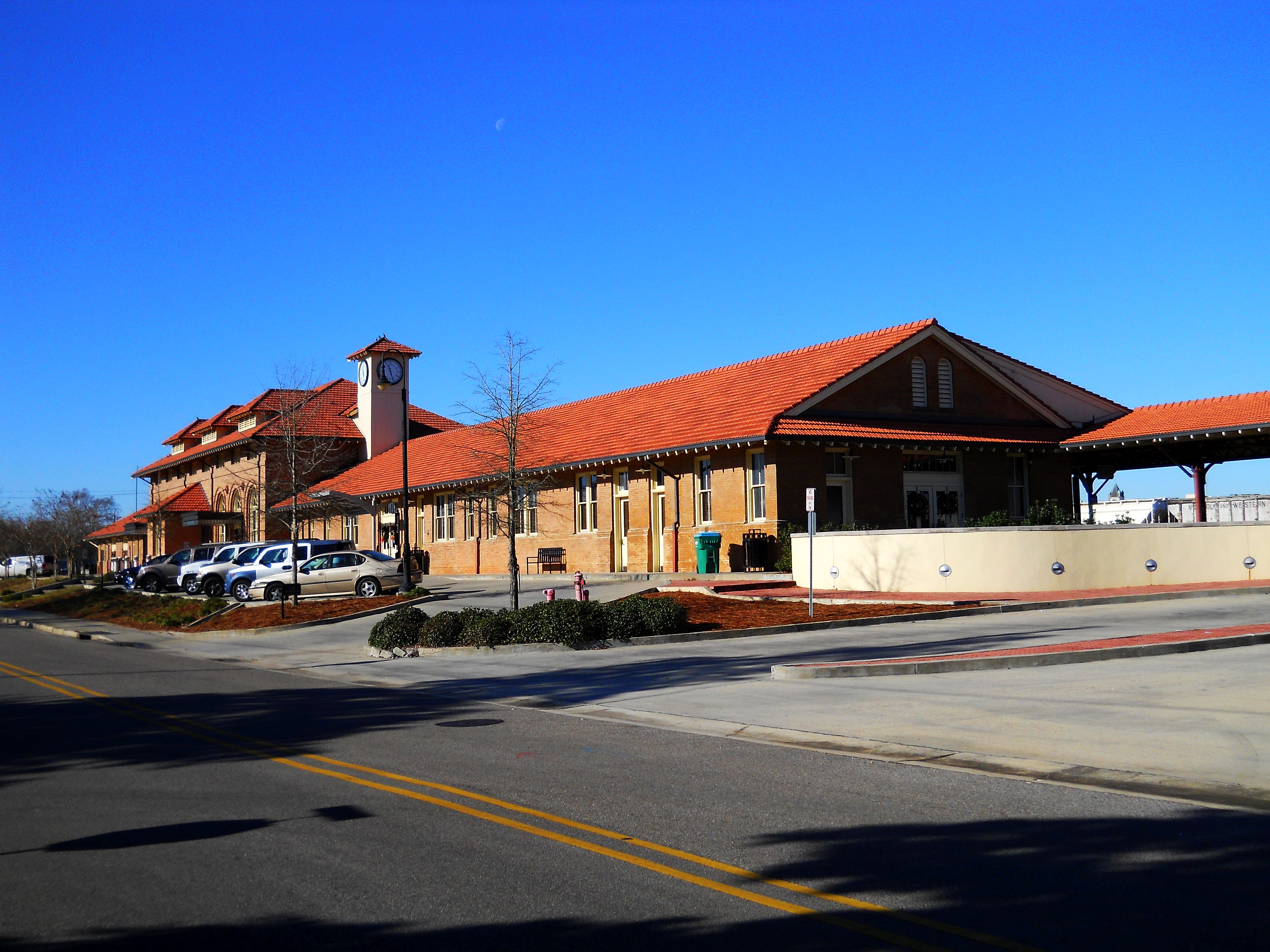

General information
- Location: 308 Newman Street; Hattiesburg, Mississippi; United States
- Coordinates: 31.3272°N 89.2864°W
- Owner: City of Hattiesburg
- Line: Norfolk Southern Railway
- Platforms: 1 side platform
- Tracks: 2

Construction
- Parking: Yes
- Cycle facilities: Yes
- Accessible: Yes

Other information
- Status: Unstaffed
- Station code: Amtrak: HBG

History
- Opened: 1910
- Rebuilt: 2007

Passengers
- FY 2025: 10,531 (Amtrak)

Services
Preceding station	Amtrak	Following station
Picayune toward New Orleans	Crescent	Laurel toward New York
Former services
Preceding station	Southern Railway	Following station
Richburg toward New Orleans	New Orleans – Cincinnati	Eastabuchie toward Cincinnati
Location

Hattiesburg station, also known as Union Station and New Orleans & Northeastern Passenger Depot, is an Amtrak intercity train station located in Hattiesburg, Mississippi, at 308 Newman Street. The station is served by Amtrak's Crescent passenger train, and is the last regular stop before its southern terminus in New Orleans. On June 14, 2001, the depot was selected as a Mississippi Landmark (035-HAT-0088-NRD-ML), and in 2002, the depot was designated as a contributing resource within the Hub City Historic District (Boundary Increase) (Reference Number 02000855, listed 2002-08-09) on the National Register of Historic Places.

== Description ==
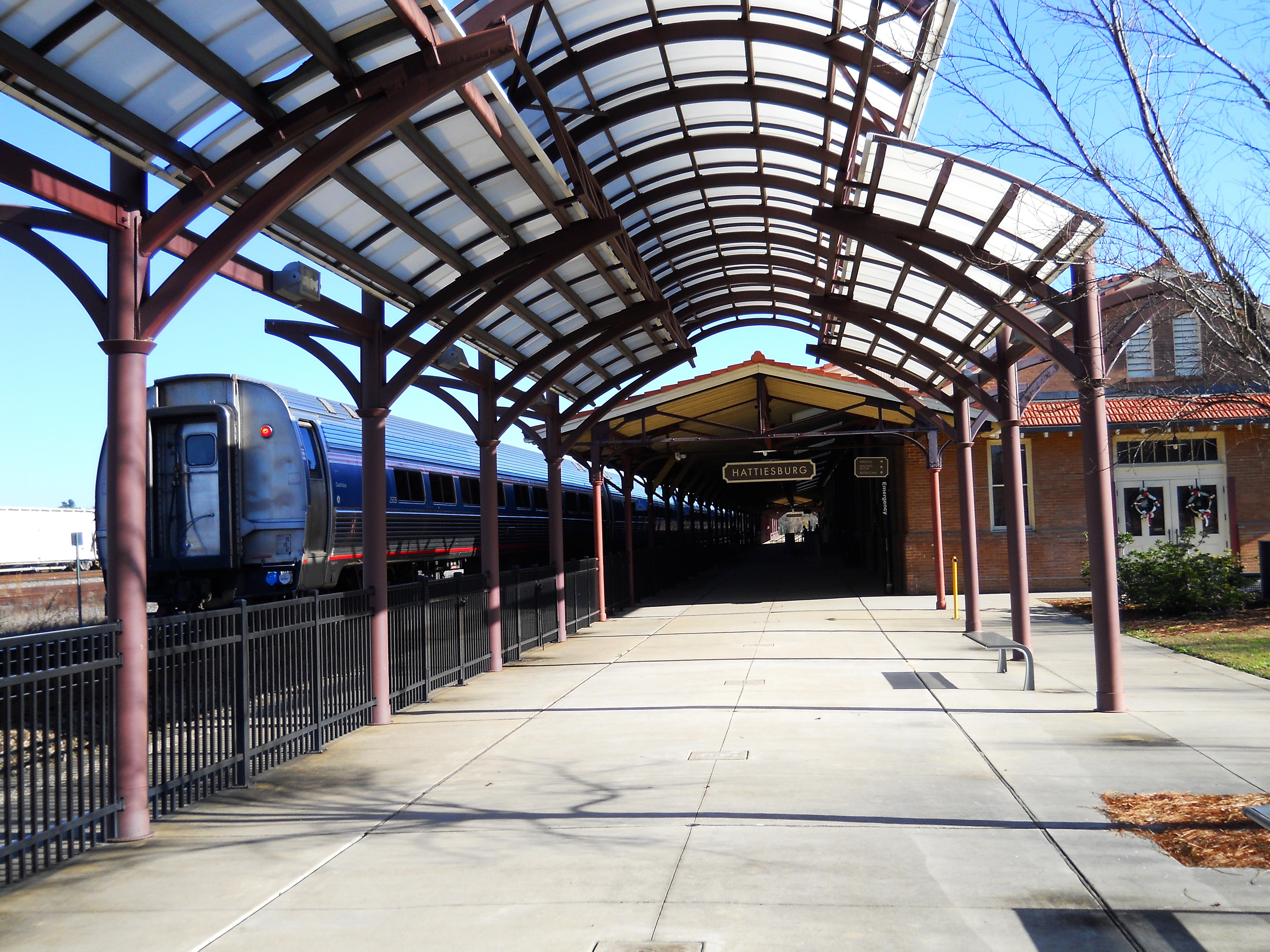
Amtrak Crescent at the platform

Designed by architect Frank Pierce Milburn, and built in 1910 for the New Orleans and Northeastern Railroad, the depot is a 1 1/2-story brick structure of Italian Renaissance Revival architectural style. The depot contains 14,000 square-feet (1300 square meters) of interior space, including a 4,000 square-foot (372 square meters) waiting room (Grand Hall) for passengers and has been in continuous use since 1910. A loading platform, adjacent to the depot, is covered by a 924-foot (282 meters) canopy.

In 2000, the City of Hattiesburg acquired the depot plus approximately 3 acres (1.2 hectares), surrounding the structure, from Norfolk Southern Railway and began extensive repairs and restoration to convert the facility into an intermodal transportation center for bus and taxi service, in addition to the railway. The 5-year restoration was completed in 2007. Funding for the $10 million renovation came from federal earmarks and grants from state, city, and private organizations.

Besides serving as an intermodal transportation center for the City of Hattiesburg, the depot's Grand Hall is used for art exhibits, social functions, and private events. The Grand Hall is no longer used for arrivals and departures by rail; a separate waiting area, in the depot, accommodates Amtrak passengers.
