= Tuscaloosa Transit Authority =

Transit authority in Alabama

- Founded: 1971
- Headquarters: 601 23rd Ave; 33°12′32″N 87°33′58″W
- Locale: Tuscaloosa, Alabama
- Service type: Bus service Demand responsive transport
- Routes: 7
- Annual ridership: 333,414 (2025)
- Website: tuscaloosatransit.com

The Tuscaloosa Transit Authority, or TTA, is a local, government-owned bus system based in Tuscaloosa, Alabama that commenced operation in 1971. The Tuscaloosa Transit Authority serves the city of Tuscaloosa south of the Black Warrior River and also operates gameday express buses for Alabama football games. The Tuscaloosa Transit Authority is governed by a seven member board, and employs a staff of 27 full-time employees as of February 2008. The TTA's fleet consists of 32-foot long ElDorado EZ Rider II BRT buses that are wrapped to resemble historic trolleys absent from Tuscaloosa since 1941.

Ridership for the system averages approximately 27,000 per month, and the system as a whole has seen recent ridership surpass pre-COVID-19 pandemic numbers, with 317,499 passengers utilizing fixed route bus service in 2025 compared with 297,875 passengers in 2019, the year immediately preceding the pandemic.

== History ==
Public transit in Tuscaloosa began in 1883 with horsecars operated by the Tuskaloosa Street Railway. By December 1887, the company had 38 horses and mules pulling the cars. A year later, the Tuskaloosa Belt Railway began service of a seven mile steam dummy line. The first electric streetcars operated on June 30, 1915 leading to the closure of the steam dummy. Over the course of 1941-1942, the streetcars were discontinued in favor of buses, which would run under private ownership until August 1964. At that time, all public transit in the city ceased, until it was revived in April 1965 under the Tuscaloosa Transit Company. This company of six buses and seven routes would finally be replaced by the current Tuscaloosa Transit Authority in 1971.

=== Intermodal Facility Transit Center ===
In February 2008, the city broke ground on a new transit center at 6th Street and 23rd Avenue The project consists of retail space, transit offices, and a 449 space parking ramp. The $12.5 million project was opened on September 23, 2009. Prior to this project being finalized, the city had been interested in converting the former train depot on Greensboro Ave. into a transit center. Currently, all bus routes meet at the transit center for the last 10 minutes of every hour, allowing passengers to easily transfer buses in a central location.

== Routes ==
The TTA operates seven fixed routes serving the city of Tuscaloosa with each originating and terminating at the downtown Intermodal Facility Transit Center. Unless otherwise specified below, service for each route is Monday through Friday between the hours of 5:00 a.m. and 6:00 p.m. at one-hour intervals. The seven fixed routes are listed below:

- 1 Alberta - Five Points - via Jack Warner and University, serves the Alberta and Five Points region of east Tuscaloosa, including the Alberta School of the Performing Arts and Crescent East public housing.
- 2 McKenzie Court - via Stillman, MLK and Fosters Ferry, serves the western portions of Tuscaloosa, including Stillman College and the McKenzie Court public housing project.
- 3 Greensboro - via Greensboro, Hargrove and 37th St, serves the Amtrak and Greyhound stations and McFarland Plaza.
- 4 VA - 15th St - via 15th St, Loop and McFarland, serves University Mall, the VA Hospital, Health Department, Easterseals and Snow Hinton Park.
- 5 Shelton State - via AL-69 and Old Greensboro, serves both Shelton State Community College campuses and shopping destinations in southwest Tuscaloosa. This route runs from 7:00 a.m. to 4:00 p.m. Mondays through Thursdays and from 7:00 a.m. to 12:00 p.m. Fridays.
- 6 University Shuttle - via University and Campus, serves the Strip, the Quad, apartments and the UA Bus Hub Transit Center. This route runs twice per hour
- 7 Skyland - via Skyland and Jug Factory, serves south Tuscaloosa, including apartments, Walmart and the Career Center.

The TTA also operates ADA complementary paratransit as required by federal regulations to transport residents whose physical or mental disabilities functionally prevent them from utilizing the fixed route service. Prospective riders must apply and obtain a doctor's signature confirming their functional disability. Each trip on paratransit costs $2.00, and personal care assistants ride free.

=== Former routes ===
- Northport Route - In December 2001, the Northport City Council approved an expansion of TTA bus service into Northport. The route served the areas between Druid City Hospital Northport and downtown. With service commencing in January 2002, the route was discontinued by the mid 2000s.
- Blue & Yellow Routes - The TTA operated a two line shuttle service on the University of Alabama campus beginning in the early 2000s. The service was never fully utilized by the student body due to limited service and a lack of promotion. The service was discontinued by 2007 with the opening of the University operated campus shuttle, the CrimsonRide.

== Fixed route ridership ==
The ridership statistics shown here are of fixed route services only and do not include demand response services.

== See also ==
- List of bus transit systems in the United States
- CrimsonRide
- Tuscaloosa station
