= Atlantic Gateway (Virginia) =

The Atlantic Gateway is a planned infrastructure improvement project in Virginia that will expand transportation routes leading into Washington, D.C. from Virginia. It includes road and rail components, and construction is planned to take place through the end of the 2010s and into the early 2020s.

== Funding ==
The budget for the entire project is estimated at $1.4 billion, and is funded by a mix of federal, state, and private sources. $710 million comes from the state's transportation budget, while rail operator CSX Transportation and toll road operator Transurban will jointly contribute $565 million and the federal government, through its FASTLANE program, issued a $165 million grant.

== Road improvements ==
Tolled high occupancy lanes on Interstate 395 will be extended about 8 miles (13 km) north from their current terminus just inside the Washington Beltway to the Pentagon, while similar lanes on Interstate 95 will be extended about 10 miles (16 km) south into Fredericksburg. I-95's crossing of the Rappahannock River will also see additional capacity added. The I-395 work is scheduled to be completed in 2019, while I-95 construction will continue into 2020.

== Rail improvements ==
Two sections of additional mainline trackage will be added to the CSX line running south through Virginia. A 6 miles (9.7 km) fourth track will be built from Long Bridge, which crosses the Potomac, south to Alexandria, and an 8 miles (13 km) third track will be built between the Franconia–Springfield station and Occoquan River crossing. CSX will transfer an abandoned right-of-way between Petersburg and the North Carolina border, a critical link in the planned Southeast High Speed Rail Corridor, to the state of Virginia. Early design and engineering work of a replaced or rebuilt Long Bridge to increase rail capacity out of Washington will also take place, through actual construction remains unfunded. Most rail construction is to take until 2020, though some minor improvements to the corridor will be completed sooner.
