= Gainesville station (Georgia) =

Gainesville, GA
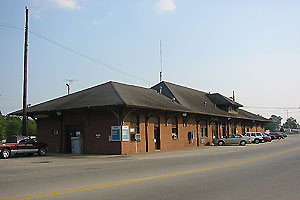

General information
- Location: 116 Industrial Boulevard; Gainesville, Georgia; United States
- Coordinates: 34.2888°N 83.8197°W
- Owner: Norfolk Southern Railway (NS)
- Line: NS Greenville District
- Platforms: 1 side platform
- Tracks: 1

Construction
- Structure type: At-grade
- Parking: Yes; free
- Accessible: Yes

Other information
- Status: Unstaffed
- Station code: Amtrak: GNS

History
- Opened: 1910
- Original company: Southern Railway

Passengers
- FY 2025: 4,743 (Amtrak)

Services
Preceding station	Amtrak	Following station
Atlanta toward New Orleans	Crescent	Toccoa toward New York
Former services
Preceding station	Southern Railway	Following station
Oakwood toward Birmingham	Main Line	Lula toward Washington, D.C.
Location

Gainesville station is a train station in Gainesville, Georgia, that is currently served by Amtrak's Crescent. The station was also known as the Gainesville Southern Railway Depot.

Constructed for the Southern Railway in 1910, the red brick station was built to replace an earlier depot damaged by a tornado in 1903. Norfolk Southern, successor of Southern Railway, uses most of the building as office space. The passenger waiting area is open for an hour before and an hour after trains arrive. The station is currently also used by a local chapter of the Fraternal Order of Eagles.
