= Toccoa station =

Toccoa, GA
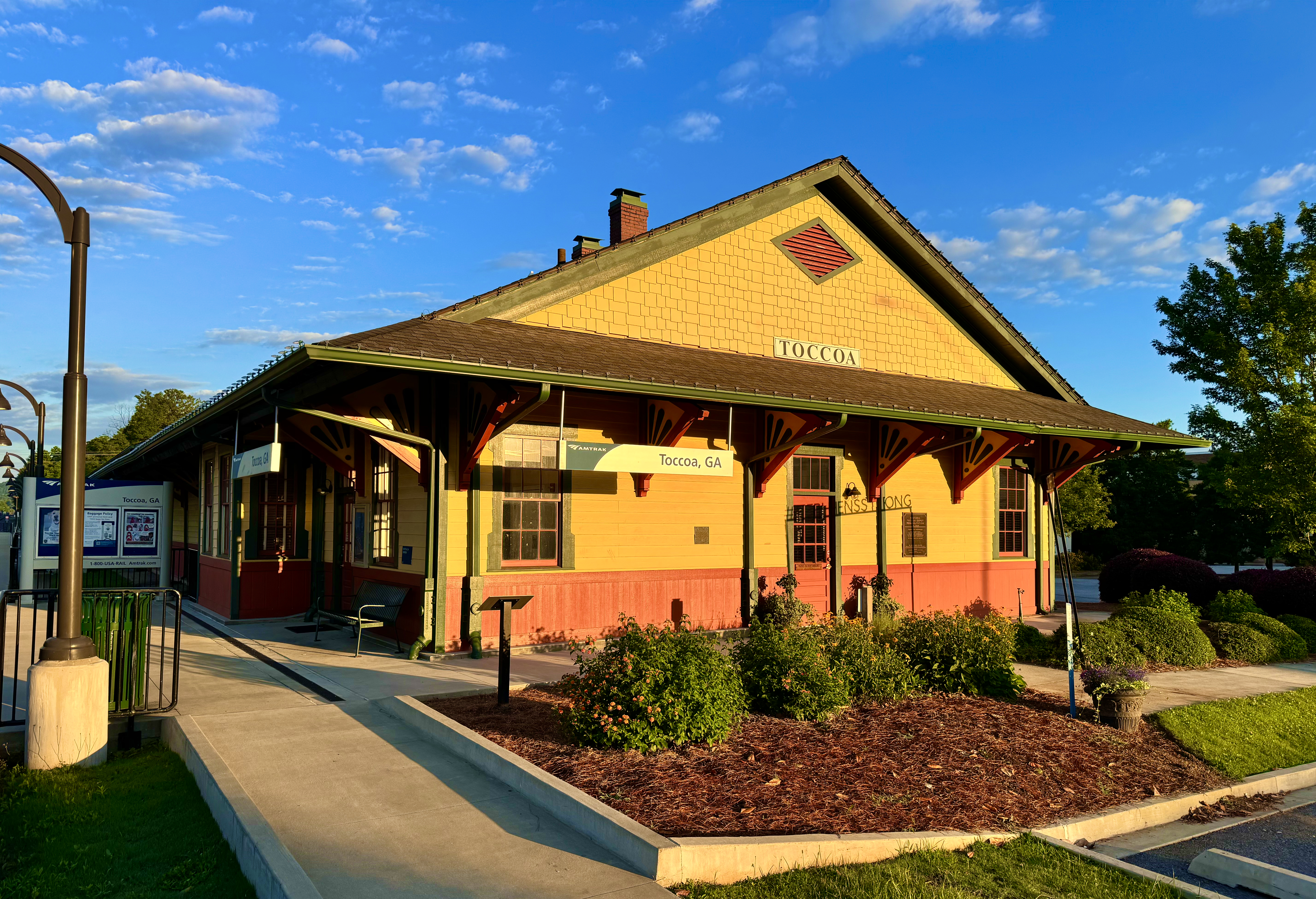
- Toccoa station in June 2024

General information
- Location: 47 North Alexander Street; Toccoa, Georgia; United States
- Coordinates: 34.5785°N 83.3318°W
- Owner: City of Toccoa
- Line: NS Greenville District
- Platforms: 1 side platform
- Tracks: 1

Construction
- Parking: Yes

Other information
- Status: Flag stop; unstaffed
- Station code: Amtrak: TCA

History
- Opened: 1915
- Original company: Southern Railway

Passengers
- FY 2025: 2,095 (Amtrak)

Services
| Preceding station | Amtrak | Following station |
|---|---|---|
| Gainesville toward New Orleans | Crescent | Clemson toward New York |
Former services
| Preceding station | Southern Railway | Following station |
|---|---|---|
| Mount Airy toward Birmingham | Main Line | Madison toward Washington, D.C. |
| Terminus | Toccoa – Elberton | Eastanollee toward Elberton |
Location

Toccoa station is an Amtrak train station in Toccoa, Georgia, served by the daily Crescent. The first station in Dry Pond (later Toccoa) opened on the Atlanta and Richmond Air-Line Railway in 1870. A new station building was constructed in 1915. It was restored from 2005 to 2009. The structure was added to the National Register of Historic Places in 2011 as part of the Toccoa Downtown Historic District.
