= Cottbus (disambiguation) =

Cottbus is a city in the state of Brandenburg, Germany.

Cottbus may also refer to:

- Cottbus, Missouri, unincorporated community in Howell County, Missouri, United States
- Landkreis Cottbus, rural district in the Province of Brandenburg (1886–1945), later part of the Soviet occupation zone and GDR (1945–1952)
- Bezirk Cottbus, a district of the German Democratic Republic (1952–1990)
- Operation Cottbus, anti-partisan operation during the occupation of Belarus by Nazi Germany (1943)
