= Spartanburg station =

Amtrak train station in South Carolina, USA

Spartanburg, SC
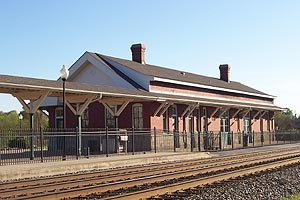

General information
- Location: 290 Magnolia Street; Spartanburg, South Carolina; United States
- Coordinates: 34.9535°N 81.9375°W
- Owner: City of Spartanburg
- Line: Charlotte District
- Platforms: 1 side platform
- Tracks: 1

Construction
- Structure type: At-grade
- Parking: 50 spaces; free
- Accessible: Yes

Other information
- Status: Unstaffed
- Station code: Amtrak: SPB

History
- Opened: 1904
- Original company: Southern Railway

Passengers
- FY 2025: 3,707 (Amtrak)

Services
Preceding station	Amtrak	Following station
Greenville toward New Orleans	Crescent	Gastonia toward New York
Former services
Preceding station	Atlantic Coast Line Railroad	Following station
Terminus	Charleston and Western Carolina Railway Main Line	Roebuck toward Port Royal
Preceding station	Southern Railway	Following station
Hayne toward Birmingham	Main Line	Converse toward Washington, D.C.
Spartanburg Junction toward Asheville	Asheville – Columbia	Cedar Spring toward Columbia
Location

Spartanburg station is an Amtrak train station in Spartanburg, South Carolina, United States. It is located at 290 Magnolia Street, within walking distance of Wofford College, the Spartanburg County government administration building and the Donald S. Russell Federal Building, which includes the federal courthouse for the U.S. District Court for the District of South Carolina.

== History ==
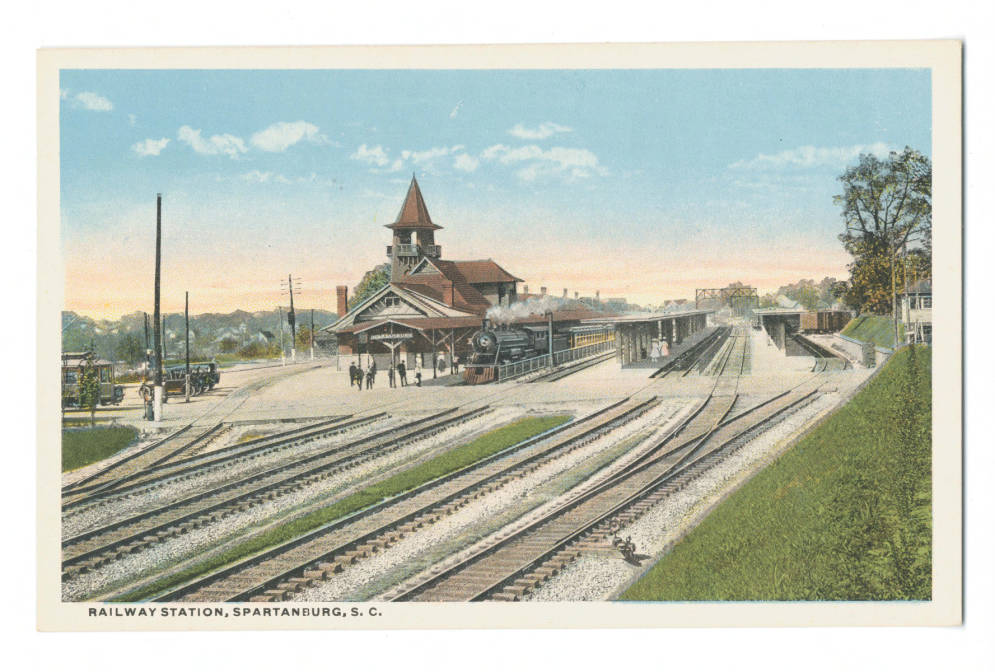
1910s Spartanburg Union Station

Opened in 1904, the Spartanburg Union Depot (also referred to as Union Station) was built by Southern Railway and also served the Clinchfield Railroad and the Charleston & Western Carolina Railway. Nicknamed "Hub City," the two-story station had one side platform and two island platforms operating on five tracks. The building included waiting areas, baggage facilities, and offices. A few years later, the station was expanded to include a three-story tower in the center. In 1915, a separate building, located west adjacent to station, was built for the Southern Express Company (packaging services).

By 1940, the three-story tower had been removed from the station. Over the next three decades, the station was gradually scaled down as passenger rail service dropped. In 1973, the main station was razed while the former Southeastern Express building was converted into the current station. In 1996, the station was damaged by fire; however, instead of being demolished it was restored thanks to a 16-year-old who launched a crusade to save the station through letters, editorials and meetings with local politicians.

In mid-twentieth century the station was a hub for passenger eservices in different directions. In addition to serving the New Orleans-Washington-New York City corridor with six departures a day to Atlanta, the station hosted two trains a day on the Asheville to Columbia line with the (including the South Carolina section of the Carolina Special ran from Cincinnati to Knoxville, Asheville, Spartanburg, Columbia and finally to Charleston). The Skyland Special ran from Asheville to Jacksonville, Florida, having a cessation from 1942 to 1947, owing to World War II. The Skyland Special was discontinued in 1958.

Into the mid 1960s, the station continued to be rather busy. The Southern Railway continued to run several New York City to Atlanta trains, of which a few such as the Crescent continued to Birmingham and New Orleans. The Southern Railway lost the Carolina Special in 1968.

== Services ==
The station, operated by Amtrak, provides inter-city rail service via the Crescent. The facility is open nightly at 11:00pm–6:00am, which includes the waiting area. No ticket sales office nor baggage services are available at this station.

== Hub City Railroad Museum ==
Located inside the depot building, the museum showcases Spartanburg's railroads and two major industries, textiles and peaches. Open on Wednesdays and Saturdays, it is operated by the Greenville Chapter of the National Railway Historical Society.
