= Tuscaloosa station =

Railway station

Tuscaloosa, AL
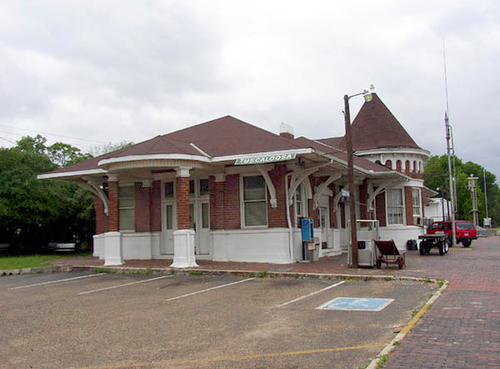
- The station as seen in 2003

General information
- Location: 2105 Greensboro Avenue; Tuscaloosa, Alabama; United States
- Coordinates: 33.1934°N 87.5601°W
- Line: Norfolk Southern Railway
- Platforms: 1 side platform
- Tracks: 3

Other information
- Status: Unstaffed
- Station code: Amtrak: TCL

History
- Opened: 1911

Passengers
- FY 2025: 10,726 (Amtrak)

Services
Preceding station	Amtrak	Following station
Meridian toward New Orleans	Crescent	Birmingham toward New York
Former services
Preceding station	Southern Railway	Following station
Englewood toward New Orleans	New Orleans – Cincinnati	Cottondale toward Cincinnati
Location

Tuscaloosa station is an Amtrak intercity rail station located at 2105 Greensboro Avenue one mile south of downtown Tuscaloosa, Alabama. Currently served exclusively by the Crescent to New York or New Orleans, the station was originally operated by the Southern Railway. Tuscaloosa was one of the last railroad-operated active passenger stations in the country, as the Southern Crescent, predecessor to the current Amtrak train, was still operated by the Southern well into the Amtrak era.
