= Greenville station =

Greenville, SC
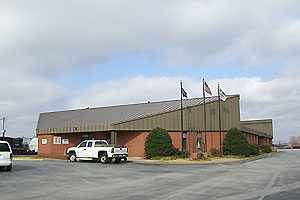

General information
- Location: 1120 West Washington Street; Greenville, South Carolina; United States
- Coordinates: 34°51′31″N 82°24′49″W
- Owner: Norfolk Southern Railway
- Line: Greenville District
- Platforms: 1 island platform 1 side platform
- Tracks: 2

Construction
- Structure type: At-grade
- Parking: 55 spaces
- Accessible: Yes

Other information
- Station code: Amtrak: GRV

History
- Opened: 1988

Passengers
- FY 2025: 8,802 (Amtrak)

Services
Preceding station	Amtrak	Following station
Clemson toward New Orleans	Crescent	Spartanburg toward New York
Location

Greenville station is an Amtrak train station in Greenville, South Carolina, United States. It is located at 1120 West Washington Street, at the south end of the Norfolk Southern Railway freight yard and one mile (1.6 km) northwest of downtown Greenville. This station has no security and no employees present.

== History ==
Opened in 1988, the modern red-brick Greenville station was built by Norfolk Southern Railway. It replaced the larger Southern Railway station, which had existed at the same location from 1905-1988.

== Services ==
The station, operated by Amtrak, provides inter-city rail service via the Crescent. The facility is open between the hours of 4:00am–6:00am and 10:00pm–12:00am, which includes the waiting area. No ticket sales office nor baggage services are available at this station.
