= Gastonia station =

Train station in Gastonia, North Carolina

Gastonia, NC
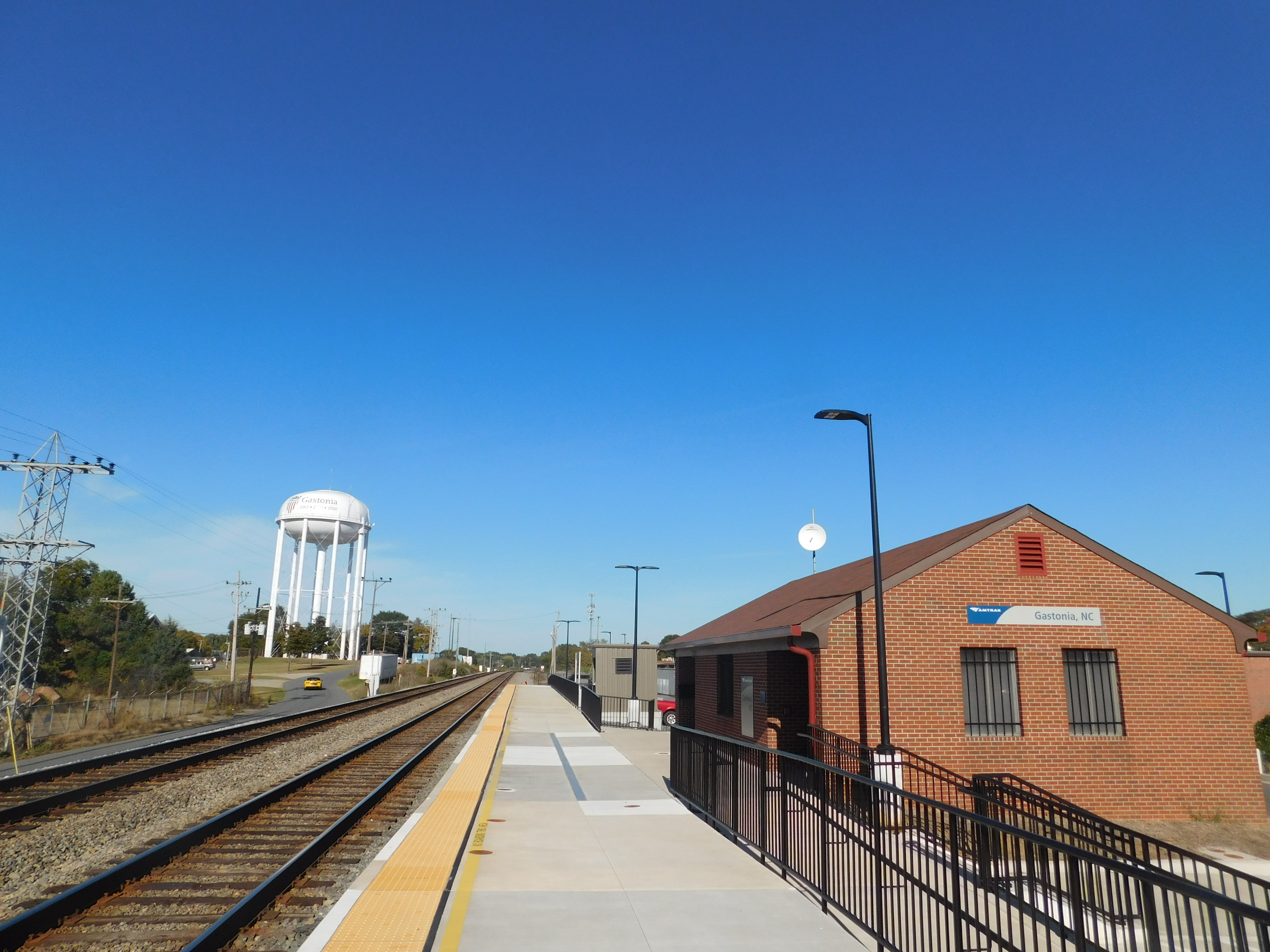
- Gastonia station in October 2021, post-renovation.

General information
- Location: 350 Hancock Street; Gastonia, North Carolina; United States
- Coordinates: 35.2692°N 81.1624°W
- Owner: Norfolk Southern Railway
- Line: Charlotte District
- Platforms: 1 side platform
- Tracks: 2

Construction
- Parking: 10 spaces
- Accessible: Yes

Other information
- Status: Flag stop; unstaffed
- Station code: Amtrak: GAS

History
- Opened: 1966
- Rebuilt: 2020
- Original company: Southern Railway

Passengers
- FY 2025: 2,146 (Amtrak)

Services
Preceding station	Amtrak	Following station
Spartanburg toward New Orleans	Crescent	Charlotte toward New York
Former services
Preceding station	Southern Railway	Following station
Bessemer City toward Birmingham	Main Line	Lowell toward Washington, D.C.
Location

Gastonia station is an Amtrak train station in Gastonia, North Carolina, United States. Located at 350 Hancock Street, it is about 1.5 miles (2.4 km) northeast of downtown Gastonia.

== History ==
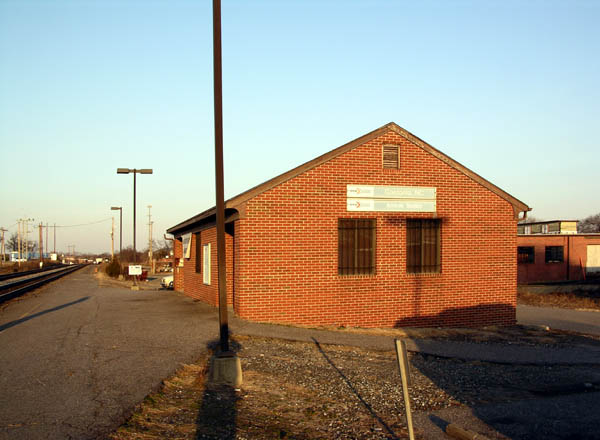
Gastonia station before renovation

The station was originally built in 1966 by Southern Railway, before being acquired by Norfolk Southern Railway. Previously, Amtrak's Gastonia stop was located on Air Line Avenue; however, it was moved in 1987 due to an effort to relocate the city's railroads.

In January 2020, Amtrak began an eight-month project to improve the historically "bare-bones," in terms of amenities, facility. The project includes a new 360-foot (110 m) concrete platform that is accessible compliant, railings, lighting and signage, along with accessible ramps and parking stalls; the station will have a new accessible entrance with a power-operable door, and renovate the waiting room and restroom. In April 2023, Amtrak completed the $3.2 million project, with upgrades that makes the station fully compliant to the Americans with Disabilities Act.

== Services ==
The station, operated by Amtrak as a flag stop (customers must have booked a reservation for the train to stop), provides inter-city rail service via the Crescent. The station opens one hour before train arrival time and closes one half hour after train departure. The station facility has a heated waiting room with restroom.
