= Greensboro Transit Agency =

Greensboro Transit Agency (GTA) buses

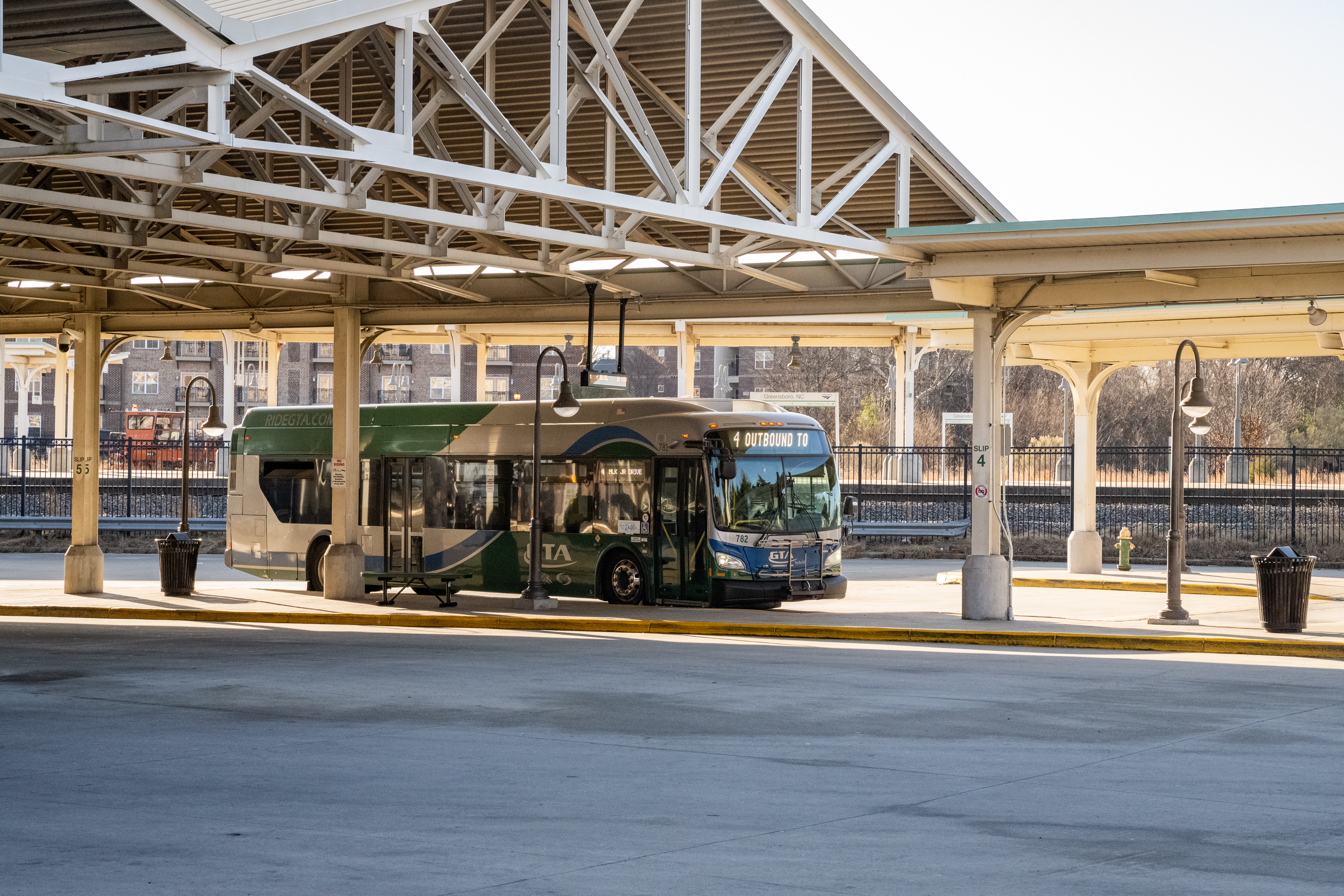
- Headquarters: 300 W Washington Street in Greensboro, North Carolina
- Service area: Guilford County, North Carolina
- Service type: Bus
- Routes: 16/1 Connector
- Stops: 1056 (GTA), 46 (HEAT)
- Fleet: 45
- Daily ridership: 7,200 (weekdays, Q2 2026)
- Annual ridership: 2,329,500 (2025)
- Fuel type: Diesel, Diesel Hybrid, Electric
- Operator: RATP Dev (since 2022)
- Website: greensboro-nc.gov/transit

The Greensboro Transit Agency (GTA) is the operator of public transportation in the Greensboro, North Carolina area. It complements three other local and one regional bus service in the Piedmont Triad. Fifteen routes travel almost solely within the city limits. In 2025, the system had a ridership of 2,329,500, or about 7,200 per weekday as of the second quarter of 2026.

In 1991, the Greensboro Transit Agency assumed operation of a private bus system run by Duke Energy (known at the time as Duke Power). The Greensboro Transit Agency consists of nine board members, each appointed for a two-year term by members of Greensboro City Council.

GTA collaborated with seven local colleges and universities in 2006 to create Higher Education Area Transit (HEAT), with nine routes serving the higher learning institutions and select destinations throughout the city.

GTA also operates Access GSO, a door-to-door and curb-to-curb paratransit service for passengers with disabilities that make riding fixed routes difficult. Previously known as Specialized Community Area Transportation (SCAT), the service was renamed in January 2021 following community input.

In early 2011, GTA added a number of diesel-electric hybrid buses to their fleet.

There are currently 45 fixed-route buses in the GTA fleet, consisting of New Flyer, Gillig, and Chevrolet makes. There are 10 buses for HEAT, all Chevrolet makes. SCAT has almost 50 paratransit vans. GTA also has ten battery-electric rechargeable buses manufactured by Proterra, Inc.

== History ==
=== Public Transportation Timeline ===
- 1925 - Southern Public Utilities, a subsidiary of Duke Power, begins public transportation services in Greensboro
- 1934 - Trackless trolleys begin service downtown
- 1962 - First African-American driver, Ed Greenlee, takes the wheel
- 1963 - Current bus fare is 15 cents per trip
- 1964 - National civil rights laws end segregation on public buses
- 1988 - Voters pass referendum authorizing property tax to support public transit
- 1990 - City of Greensboro takes over transit services from Duke Power
- 1991 - Greensboro City Council creates Greensboro Transit Authority; fare is 50 cents per trip
- 1992 - GTA carries one millionth rider; launches Career Express
- 1992 - GTA receives first lift-equipped buses and SCAT vans
- 1993 - Bus fare is 70 cents per trip
- 1995 - GTA displays first advertising painted bus
- 1996 - African-American female appointed Public Transportation Manager
- 1997 - Bus fare is $1 per trip
- 1998 - Evening modified (deviated) bus service offered for first time since departure of Duke Transit
- 1999 - Evening and Sunday fixed schedule offered
- 2000 - GTA debuts talking buses
- 2002 - SCAT service area adjusted to 3/4 mile of Fixed Route Corridor except for previously established trips.
- 2003 - Opening of J. Douglas Galyon Depot multi-modal transportation center (Phase 1); six-month operational analysis performed on SCAT recommended elimination of monthly pass and grandfathered trips, establishment of premium fare for non-ADA trips and development of a method of payment for users who cannot easily manipulate a cash fare
- 2004 - GTA Board established a two-tiered fare structure that enabled riders who resided or traveled beyond the ADA service area to ride SCAT at a higher rate
- 2005 City Council votes to terminate the two-tiered fare structure, institute a "single ADA paratransit service" and extend the SCAT service area to anywhere within the City limits at the same base fare for all trips
- 2006 - Higher Education Area Transit (HEAT) begins service
- 2007 - GTA Board adopts revised fare structure that supported City Council recommendation; adds sedans to fleet; GTA fare is $1.10 per trip; HEAT website wins American Public Transportation Association AdWheel Award; 30-minute service begins on all daytime routes
- 2008 - GTA fare is $1.20 per trip
- 2009 - Daytime routes extended from 7 to 15 routes; fare increased to $1.30 per trip as part of third planned fare increase
- 2010 - GTA radio commercial wins American Public Transportation Association AdWheel Award; GTA Transportation Center offers free Wi-Fi and electronic charging station; HEAT adds direct routes to area shopping districts; construction begins on new Operations and Maintenance Facility and Administrative Offices
- 2011 - GTA places into operation Greensboro's first diesel-electric hybrid buses
- 2012 - GTA completes construction on new 66,000-square-foot Operations/Maintenance Facility and Administrative Office at 223 W. Meadowview Rd, fares increased to $1.50 per trip
- 2013 - GTA places in operation first gasoline-electric hybrid SCAT vans
- 2014 - Debut of GoPass, GTA's first rechargeable smart card
- 2015 - GTA wins marketing awards from North Carolina City-County Communicators
- 2016 - Live bus tracking begins
- 2017 - GTA wins American Public Transportation Association AdWheel Marketing Award
- 2018 - North Carolina's first battery-electric buses to be placed into municipal service begins serving Greensboro. GTA wins American Public Transportation Association AdWheel Marketing Award
- 2019 - Greensboro City Council changes Greensboro Transit Authority Board to Greensboro Transit Advisory Commission
- 2019 - Operations and maintenance contracted to Keolis
- 2022 - RATP Dev takes over as operations and maintenance contractor

== Route list ==
This list does not include the HEAT routes which are also operated by the Greensboro Transit Agency with GTA fares.

- 1 West Wendover Avenue/Spring Garden Street
- 2 Four Seasons Boulevard
- 3 North Elm Street
- 4 Martin Luther King Jr Drive/Benbow Road/Willow Road
- 5 Gorrell Street
- 6 Summit Avenue/McKnight Mill Road
- 7 Friendly Avenue/Friendly Shopping Center
- 8 Battleground Avenue/Cotswold Avenue
- 9 West Market Street/Swing Road
- 10 East Market Street/Phillips Avenue
- 11 West Gate City Boulevard/GTCC Jamestown
- 12 South Elm-Eugene Street
- 12A South Town Connector
- 13 Randleman Road
- 14 Bessemer Avenue/Phillips Avenue
- 15 Yanceyville Street/Brightwood School Road
- 17 Lawndale Drive

Sunday Routes

- 21 Summit Avenue/North Elm Street
- 22 East Market Street/Bessemer Avenue/Phillips Avenue
- 23 Gorrell Street/Benbow Street/MLK Jr
- 24 Randleman Road/South Elm-Eugene Street
- 25 Four Seasons Town Centre/West Gate City Boulevard
- 26 West Wendover Avenue/West Friendly Avenue
- 27 Battleground Avenue/ Friendly Shopping Center
