= Clemson Area Transit =

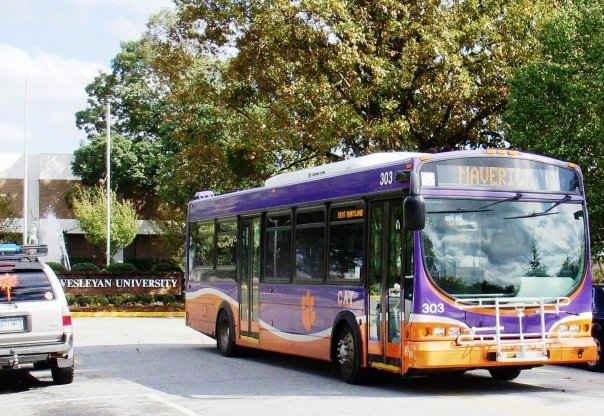
- A CAT bus at Southern Wesleyan University
- Founded: January 8, 1996
- Headquarters: 200 West Lane Clemson, South Carolina 29631
- Locale: South Carolina
- Service area: Clemson and Clemson University with service to Central and Pendleton
- Service type: Bus service
- Routes: 8
- Annual ridership: 1,050,800 (2025)
- Fuel type: Electric, Diesel
- Operator: Clemson University, Town of Pendleton, Town of Central, City of Clemson, South Carolina Department of Transportation
- Chief executive: Keith Moody
- Website: catbus.com

Clemson Area Transit (CAT), known locally as the "CATbus", is a zero-fare bus system serving Clemson University, the City of Clemson, and the Towns of Central and Pendleton in the U.S. state of South Carolina. The headquarters of the organization is located in the City of Clemson. In 2025, the system had a ridership of 1,050,800.

The fare-free system is made possible by federal grants and matching funds from the city and University. CAT operates a modern fleet of buses, including over 10 forty-foot-long Proterra electric buses, 7 forty-foot-long Nova LFS buses, and two articulated Nova buses, which were the first articulated buses operating in South Carolina. Utilizing multiple routes, CAT buses help transport citizens and students from campus or downtown to surrounding neighborhoods and apartment complexes, and move travelers from the Clemson area to surrounding communities.

The service is jointly operated by the City of Clemson, Clemson University, the Town of Pendleton, the Town of Central, and South Carolina Department of Transportation.

== History ==
In 2024, Seneca voted to end its CATbus service due to the cost of replacing its aging electric bus fleet.

== Routes ==
As of 2026, CAT operates five bus routes:

- Pendleton Route - service throughout Pendleton and to Tri-County Technical College
- Red Route - Service to Central and Clemson
- Central Route
- Gold Route - Service throughout Clemson, to Patrick Square neighborhood
- Highpointe/Pier Route - Shuttles from apartment complexes to Clemson University

CAT buses are characterized by purple and orange paint schemes. Buses are equipped with bike racks and are handicap accessible. Buses operated in Seneca had a dark blue and gold color scheme.
