= Southern Railway Terminal (New Orleans) =

Southern Railroad Terminal
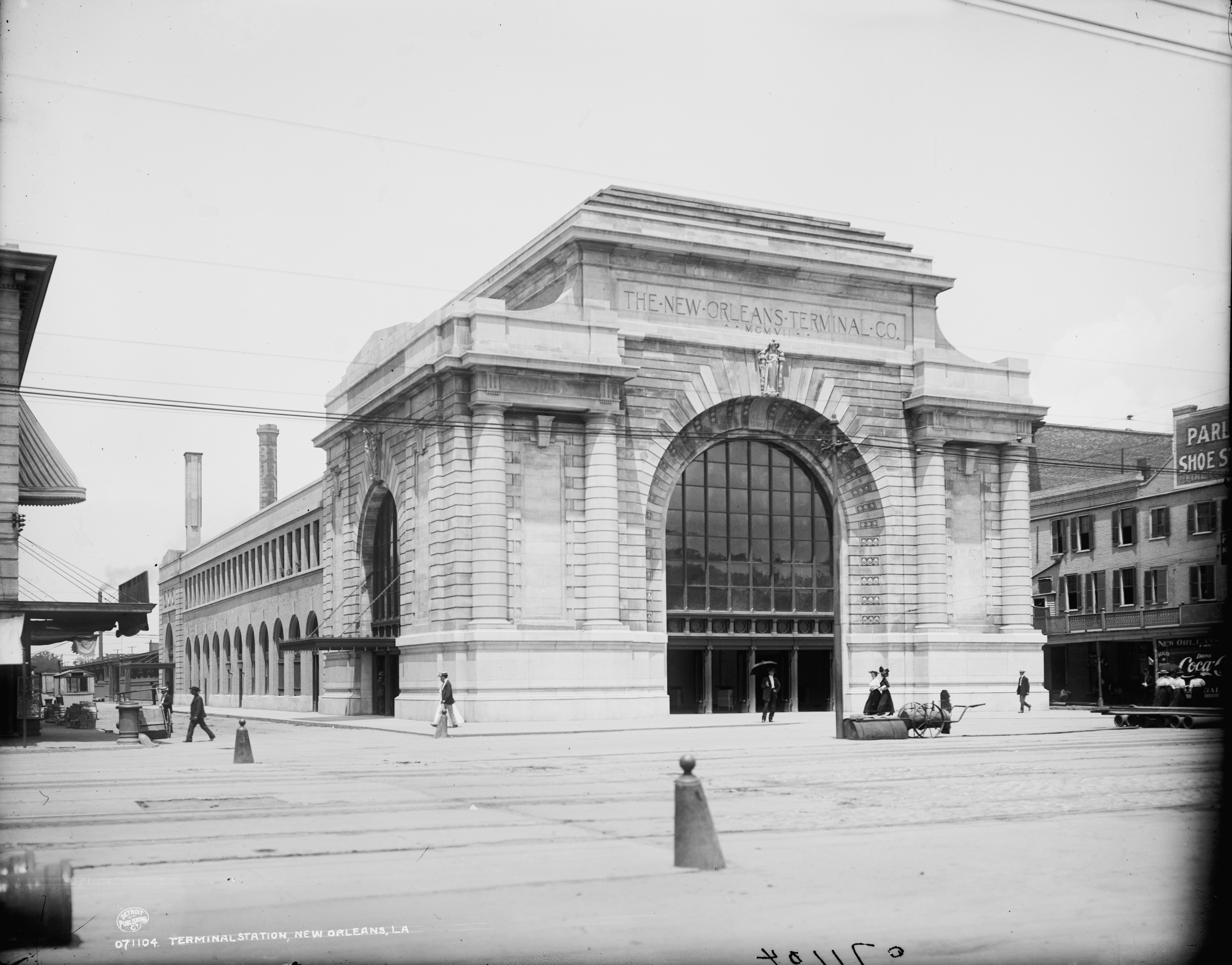
- New Orleans Terminal on Canal Street

General information
- Location: 1125 Canal Street; New Orleans, Louisiana
- Coordinates: 29°57′23″N 90°04′23″W
- System: Passenger Station
- Operator: Southern Railway (US)

History
- Opened: 1908
- Closed: 1956

Former services
Preceding station	Southern Railway	Following station
Terminus	New Orleans – Cincinnati	Seabrook toward Cincinnati
Location

The Southern Railway Terminal, originally officially "New Orleans Terminal", in New Orleans was constructed by the Southern Railway in 1908 on the neutral ground of Basin Street at the intersection of Canal Street. The building was designed by Daniel Burnham, who was also the architect for the Union Station in Washington D.C. The station also served the New Orleans and Northeastern Railroad and the New Orleans Terminal Company. It was the terminus for many of Southern's premier trains, most notably the Crescent. As such, it was the "front door" to New Orleans for many passengers from the Northeast for most of the first half of the 20th century. The Gulf Mobile & Ohio Little Rebel trains also operated into Terminal Station.

From New Orleans, Southern provided service to the following areas:

- Northern Gateway (Cincinnati, Louisville and Washington D.C.)
- Western Gateway (Memphis and St. Louis)
- Ports (Baltimore, Brunswick, Charleston, Gulfport, Jacksonville, and Savannah)

The station was demolished in 1956 after all passenger service was relocated to the new Union Passenger Terminal. After station and tracks were removed the neutral ground was landscaped and the area was designated as the "Garden of the Americas".

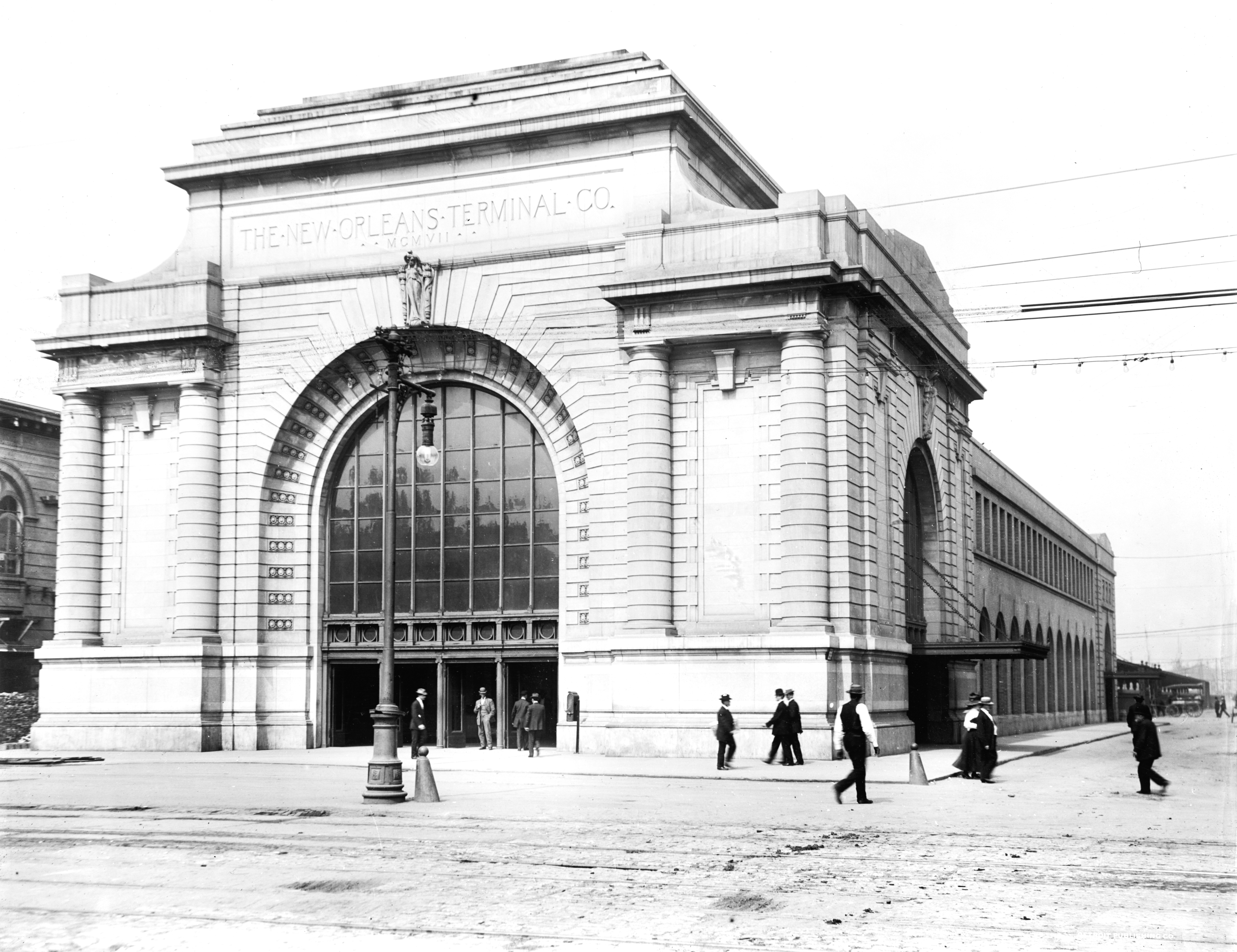
Southern Railroad Terminal from Canal Street

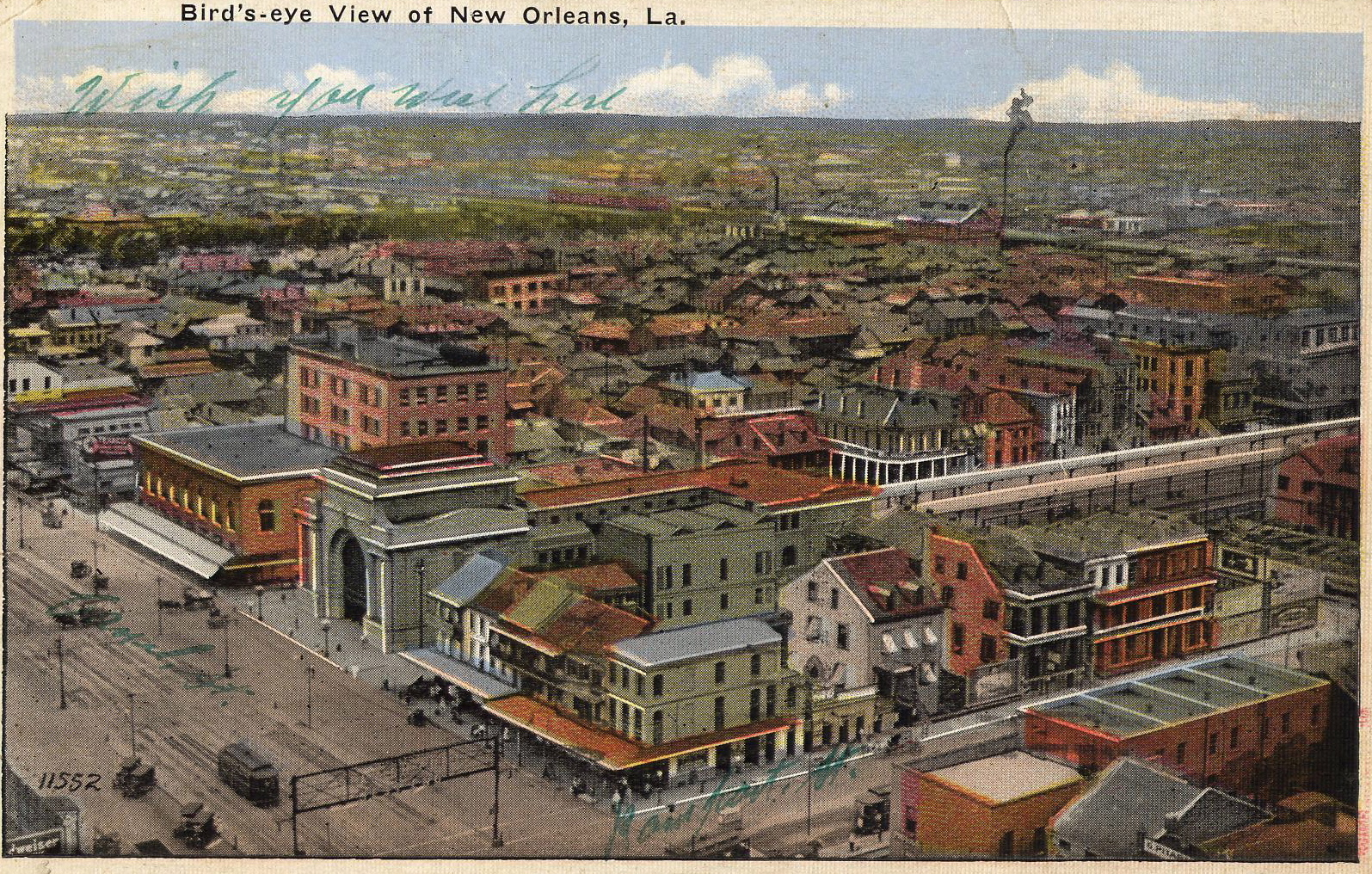
Postcard - Southern Railroad Terminal seen from atop Roosevelt Hotel
