= Terminal Station (Atlanta, Georgia) =

Former railway station in Atlanta, Ga., USA (demolished 1972)

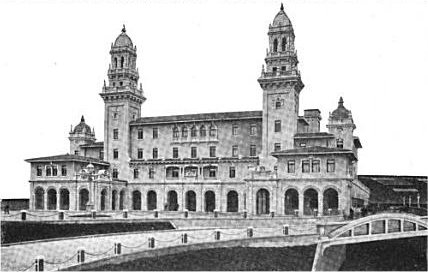
- Terminal Station in 1918.

General information
- Location: 75 Spring Street SW; Atlanta, Georgia, United States
- Coordinates: 33.753°N 84.396°W
- System: Inter-city rail

History
- Opened: May 1905
- Closed: June 1970 (demolished 1972)
- Rebuilt: 1947

Former services
Preceding station	Atlanta, Birmingham and Coast Railroad	Following station
Terminus	Atlanta – Waycross until mid-1930s	Ben Hill toward Waycross
Preceding station	Central of Georgia Railway	Following station
Terminus	Main Line	Fort McPherson toward Savannah
Terminus	Suburban trains	Mitchell Street toward Jonesboro
Preceding station	Seaboard Air Line Railroad	Following station
Floyd toward Birmingham	Birmingham – Monroe	Emory toward Monroe
Preceding station	Southern Railway	Following station
Chattahoochee toward Birmingham	Main Line	Atlanta Peachtree toward Washington, D.C.
Austell toward Chattanooga	Chattanooga – Jacksonville	Roseland toward Jacksonville
Roseland toward Columbus, GA	Columbus, GA – Atlanta	Terminus
Terminus	Atlanta – Fort Valley	Roseland toward Fort Valley
Preceding station	West Point Route	Following station
East Point toward Montgomery	Main Line	Terminus
Location

Terminal Station was the larger of two principal train stations in downtown Atlanta, Union Station being the other. Opening in 1905, Terminal Station served Southern Railway, Seaboard Air Line, Central of Georgia (including the Nancy Hanks to Savannah), and the Atlanta and West Point. The architect was P. Thornton Marye, whose firm also designed the Fox Theater and Capital City Club in downtown Atlanta, as well as the Birmingham Terminal Station.

At the station's opening in 1905 the military band of the 16th Infantry Regiment played "Down in Dixie" according to a report that appeared in the Atlanta Journal. On May 21, 1910, a statue of Samuel Spencer, who had served as the first president of Southern Railway, was dedicated at the station, where it would remain until the station's closing.

In its 20th century heyday, Terminal Station was used by such well-known trains of the time as the Crescent, Man o' War, Nancy Hanks, Royal Palm, Ponce de Leon, and Silver Comet. A rail-travel crossroads of the American south-east, it was a critical railroad link between the warm climate of Florida and the Gulf Coast, and the rather colder, more densely populated states of the north-east and mid-west. For many residents of the Northeast, Terminal Station was the gateway to the sunshine. The Atlanta Convention Bureau released a postcard in the 1920s that claimed that Terminal Station was served by 86 trains per day.

The train shed that had originally been built alongside the head house was torn down in 1925. The Southern Railway built an office building next door to the station at 99 Spring Street that is still standing, although the Southern eventually moved their local offices to another building in Atlanta. On 17 May 1938 a five-story Terminal Hotel, that had been built across the street from Terminal Station, burned in a disaster that claimed 27 lives.

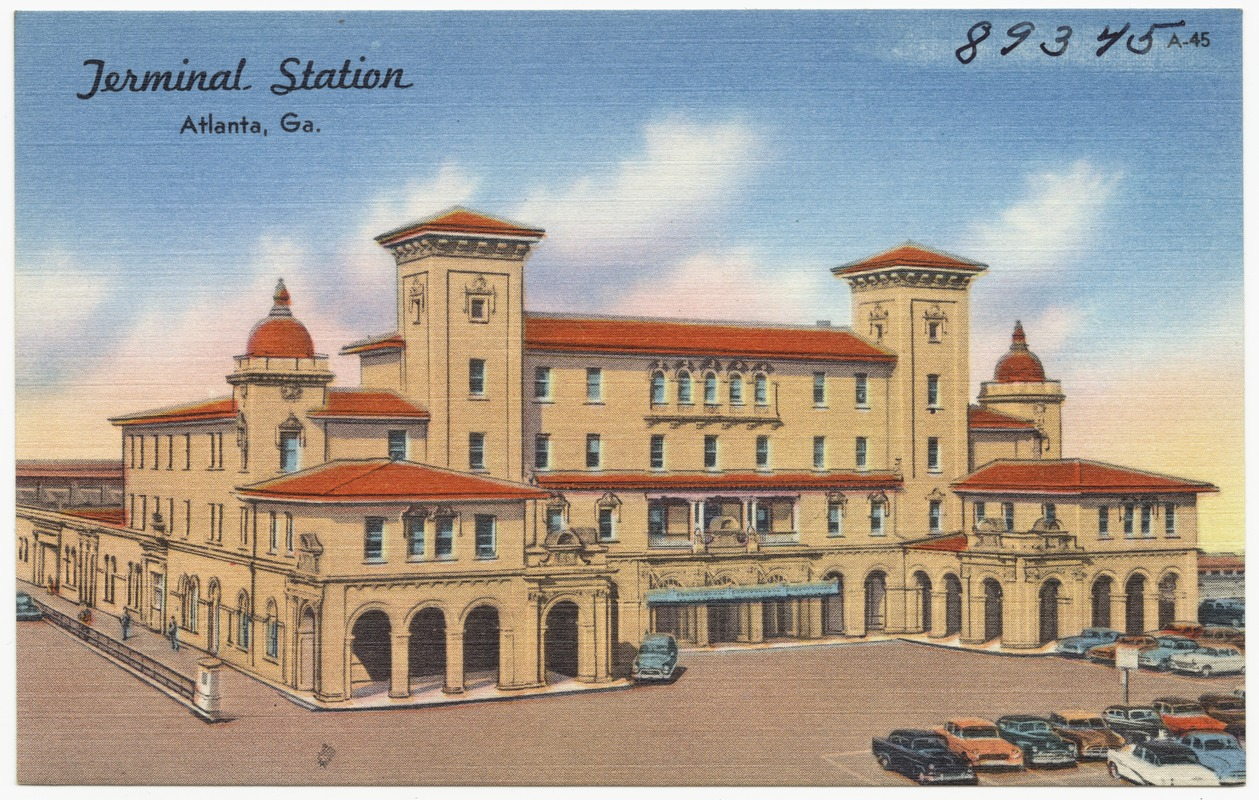
Terminal Station showing its shortened towers, c. 1949

The station head house was renovated in 1947 just after World War II.

After Terminal Station closed in June 1970, Southern continued to operate its Southern Crescent and Piedmont passenger trains using the much smaller Peachtree Station, commonly known as Brookwood Station and built as a suburban station, as their only stop in Atlanta. The only other passenger train remaining at that time that had been using Terminal Station, the Nancy Hanks, used a makeshift ticket office and waiting room in the Southern office building next door.

Terminal Station was razed in 1972, and the Richard B. Russell Federal Building, built in 1979, currently occupies the site.

The last remains of the station were an interlocking tower and a portion of one of the station platforms retained by the Southern, the former demolished in June, 2018, and the latter demolished November, 2019.

== Major trains ==
- Atlanta & West Point; and Southern Railway
  - Crescent: New York - New Orleans
- Central of Georgia Railway
  - Man O'War: Atlanta - Columbus
  - Nancy Hanks: Atlanta - Savannah
  - Southland: Chicago- St. Petersburg, Sarasota and Miami
- Seaboard Air Line (Seaboard Coast Line after 1967)
  - Cotton Blossom: New York - Birmingham
  - Passenger Mail and Express: Washington and Portsmouth - Birmingham
  - Silver Comet: New York and Portsmouth - Birmingham
- Southern Railway
  - Florida Sunbeam (winter only): Chicago, Detroit and Cleveland - Miami
  - Kansas City–Florida Special: Kansas City - Jacksonville
  - New Yorker: New York - Atlanta
  - Peach Queen: New York - Atlanta, with through sleepers continuing west to Shreveport on the Southwestern Limited
  - Piedmont Limited: New York - Atlanta
  - Ponce de Leon: Cincinnati - Miami and St. Petersburg
  - Royal Palm: Cincinnati - Jacksonville
  - Southerner: New York - Birmingham
  - Sunnyland: Atlanta - Birmingham
  - Washington-Atlanta-New Orleans Express

== See also ==
- Atlanta Union Station (1930)

== Bibliography ==
- Loy, Sallie; Hillman, Dick; Cates, C. Pat (2004). The Southern Railway. Images of Rail (1st ed.). Arcadia Publishing. ISBN 978-0-7385-1641-7.
