= Samuel Spencer (railroad executive) =

American railroad executive (1847–1906)

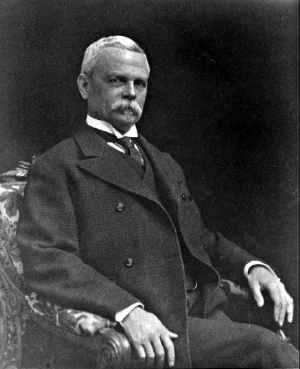
- Born: March 20, 1847; Columbus, Georgia, U.S.
- Died: November 29, 1906 (aged 59); Virginia, U.S.
- Burial place: Oak Hill Cemetery; Washington, D.C., U.S.
- Education: University of Georgia; University of Virginia
- Occupation: President of Southern Railway
- Spouse: Louise Benning

Samuel Spencer (March 20, 1847 – November 29, 1906) was an American civil engineer, businessman, and railroad executive. With an education interrupted by service in the Confederate cavalry late in the American Civil War, he completed his education at the University of Georgia and the University of Virginia.

Spencer spent his career with railroads, rising through the ranks during the busy growth years of American railroading in the late 19th century. He eventually became president of six railroads, and was a director of at least ten railroads and several banks and other companies.

Although his career was cut short when he was killed in a train wreck in Virginia in 1906, Samuel Spencer is best remembered as the Father of the Southern Railway System. Spencer, North Carolina, site of the North Carolina Transportation Museum, was named in his honor.

== Early life ==
Samuel Spencer was born on March 20, 1847, in Columbus, Georgia, to Vernie Mitchel and Lambert Spencer. He attended the school of John Isham in Columbus.

At the age of 16, Spencer enlisted in the Confederate States Army. He served two years as a member of Nelson Rangers. Following the Civil War, he attended the University of Georgia and graduated with first honors in 1868. He then studied engineering at the University of Virginia.

== Career ==
After graduating, Spencer worked as a civil engineer with Mr. Sharpe to build a road from Opelika, Alabama, to Goodwater, Alabama. Spencer followed Sharpe to Long Branch, New Jersey, to survey a road as his assistant superintendent. He then followed Sharpe to the Baltimore and Ohio Railroad and then became superintendent of the Old Virginia Midland Railroad.

In 1869, he began working with railroads as a surveyor, and rose through the ranks, learning many aspects of railroad management. He became superintendent of the Long Island Rail Road in 1878 and was president of the Baltimore and Ohio Railroad during 1887–1888, following Robert Garrett.

In 1889, Spencer left the presidency of the Baltimore and Ohio to become a railroad expert working for financier J.P. Morgan of Drexel, Morgan and Company. According to the New York Times, "It was said of him that there was no man in the country so thoroughly well posted on every detail of a railroad from the cost of a car brake to the estimate for a new terminal."

When the bankrupt Richmond and Danville Railroad (R&D) was acquired by Drexel, Morgan and Company in 1894, the new Southern Railway was formed by the financiers from a consolidation of the R&D and the East Tennessee, Virginia and Georgia Railroad.

Tapped to lead the new railroad for Morgan, Spencer became its first president. Under his leadership, the mileage of the Southern Railway doubled, the number of passengers served annually increased to nearly 12 million, and annual earnings increased from $17 million to $54 million. After his death, the Southern grew to become one of the strongest and most profitable in the United States, merging with the also strong and profitable Norfolk and Western Railway in the 1980s to form Norfolk Southern, a Fortune 500 company.

== Personal life ==
Spencer married Louise Benning, daughter of General Henry L. Benning. They had at least three children, Henry Benning, Vivan and Mrs. James Lane. He had homes in New York City and Washington, D.C.

Spencer's career was cut short when he was killed at the age of 59 in a train collision in Virginia before dawn on Thanksgiving morning, November 29, 1906. The Spencer party were in his private car, at the rear of the train, en route to his hunting lodge near Friendship, North Carolina. When the coupling failed on the lead car, the train was left stalled on the track. A following train ran into the stranded cars in the pre-dawn darkness, crushing the Spencer car, killing Spencer & all but one of its occupants.

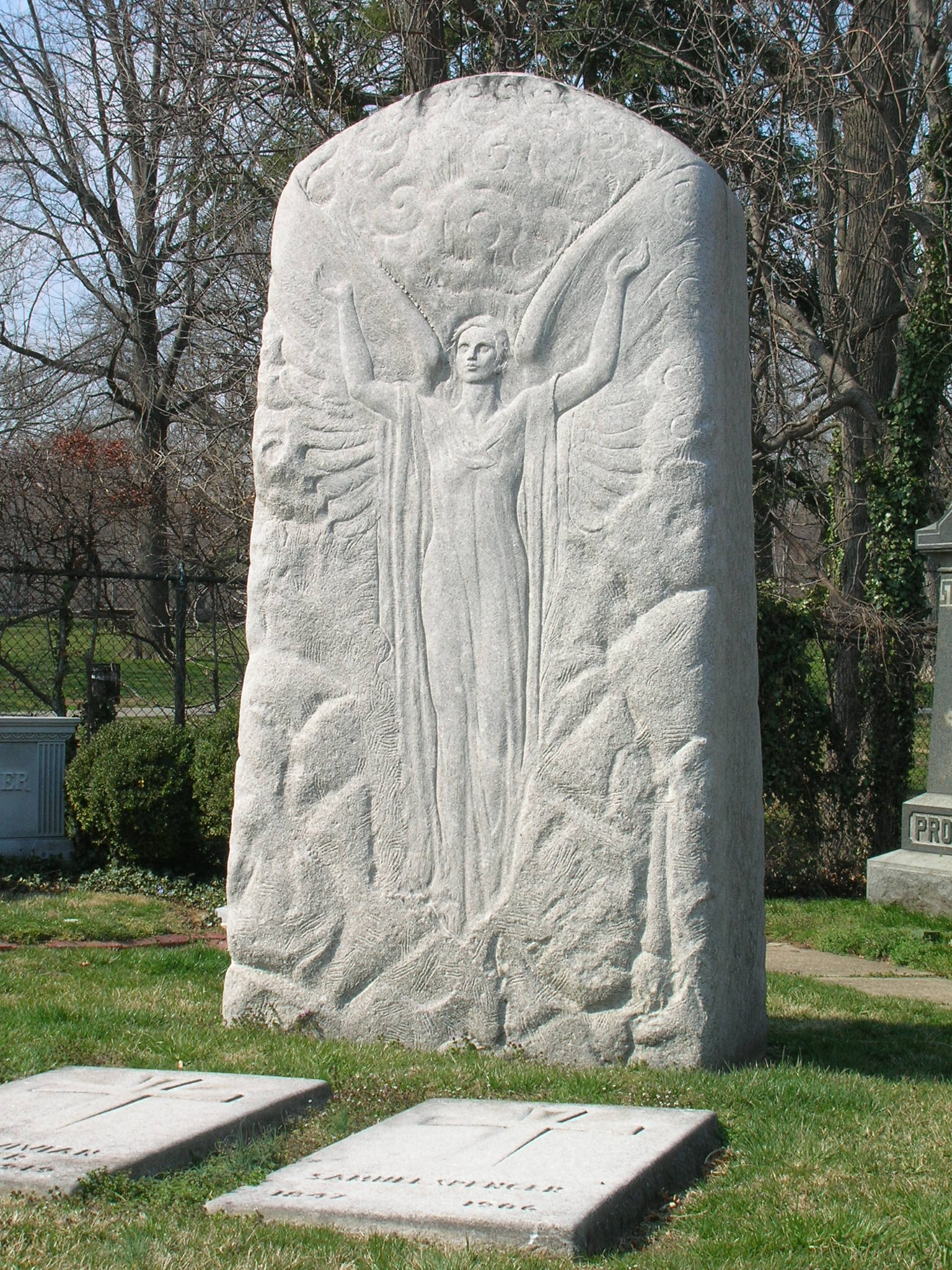
Grave of Spencer at Oak Hill Cemetery

Spencer was buried at Oak Hill Cemetery.

== Legacy ==
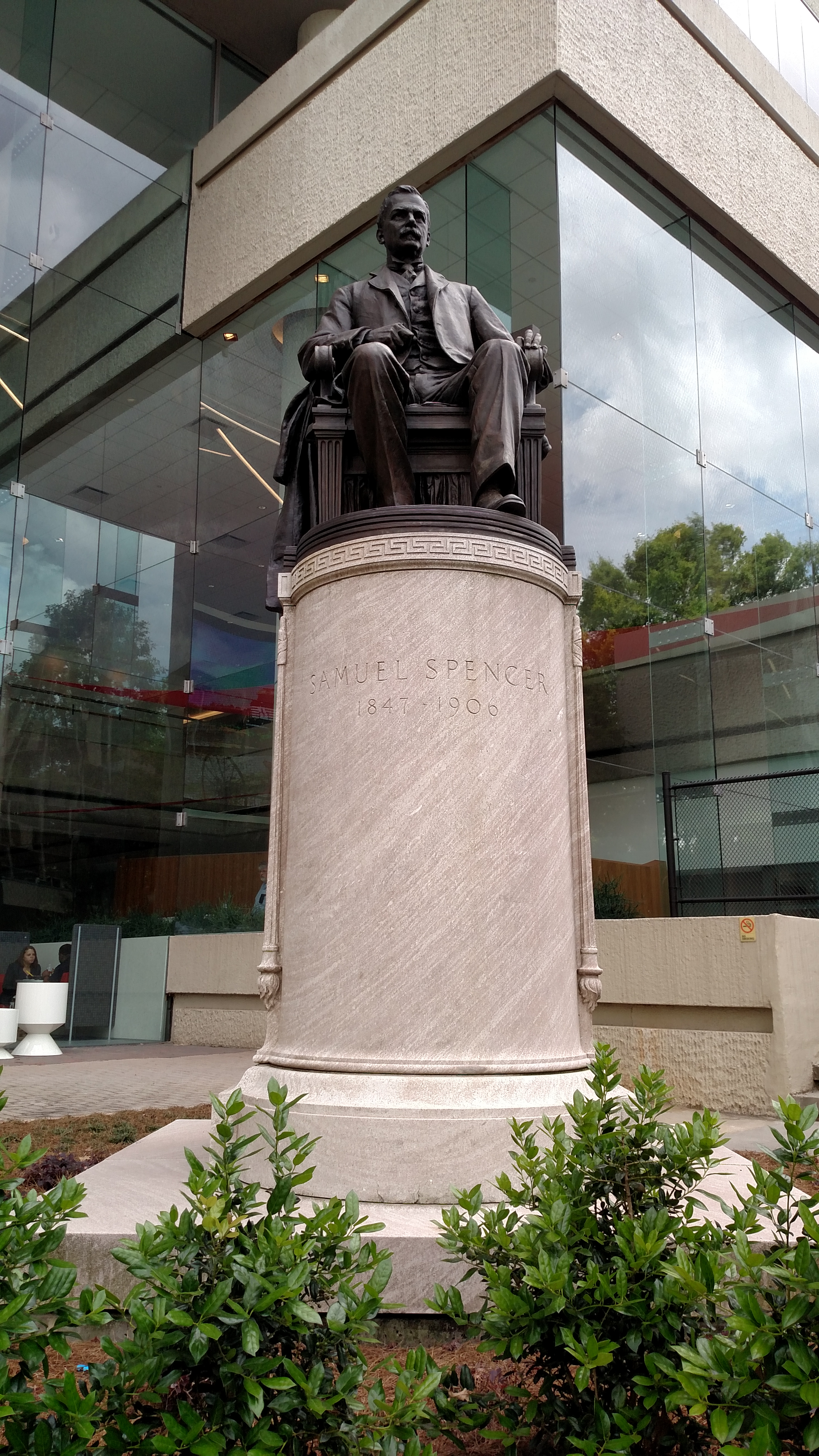
Statue of Samuel Spencer

Spencer is credited with leading the Southern Railway and the South during a period of unprecedented growth. After his untimely death, 30,000 Southern Railway employees contributed to pay for a statue of him by sculptor Daniel Chester French, which was dedicated in 1910 and stood for many years at Atlanta's Terminal Station. Following the station's demolition in 1970, the statue was moved multiple times, first to Peachtree station, then in 1996 to Hardy Ivy Park, and it also moved in front of the Norfolk Southern building at the intersection of Peachtree Street and 15th Street in Midtown Atlanta. In late 2023, it moved to its final resting place at the Atlanta History Center.

Spencer was also a member of the Jekyll Island Club, which operated as an exclusive millionaire's retreat from 1888 to 1942. Spencer's former apartment in the Clubhouse Annex is said to be haunted by his ghost.

The Southern Railway's Spencer Shops and the town of Spencer, North Carolina were named in his honor. In 1977, the closed Spencer Shops formed the basis of the new North Carolina Transportation Museum.

== See also ==
- List of railroad executives
- Spencer Yard

Southern Railway created	President of Southern Railway; 1894 – 1906	Succeeded by William W. Finley
