= Royal Palm =

Royal Palm may refer to:

- Royal palm or Roystonea, a genus of palm trees
- Royal Palm (train), a passenger train of the Southern Railway
- Royal Palm (turkey), a breed of domestic turkey

== See also ==
- Royal Palm Golf and Country Club, Lahore, Punjab, Pakistan
- Royal Palms Resort and Spa, Phoenix, Arizona
- Royal Palm Hotel (disambiguation)
