= Peachtree station =

Railway station in Atlanta, US

Atlanta, GA
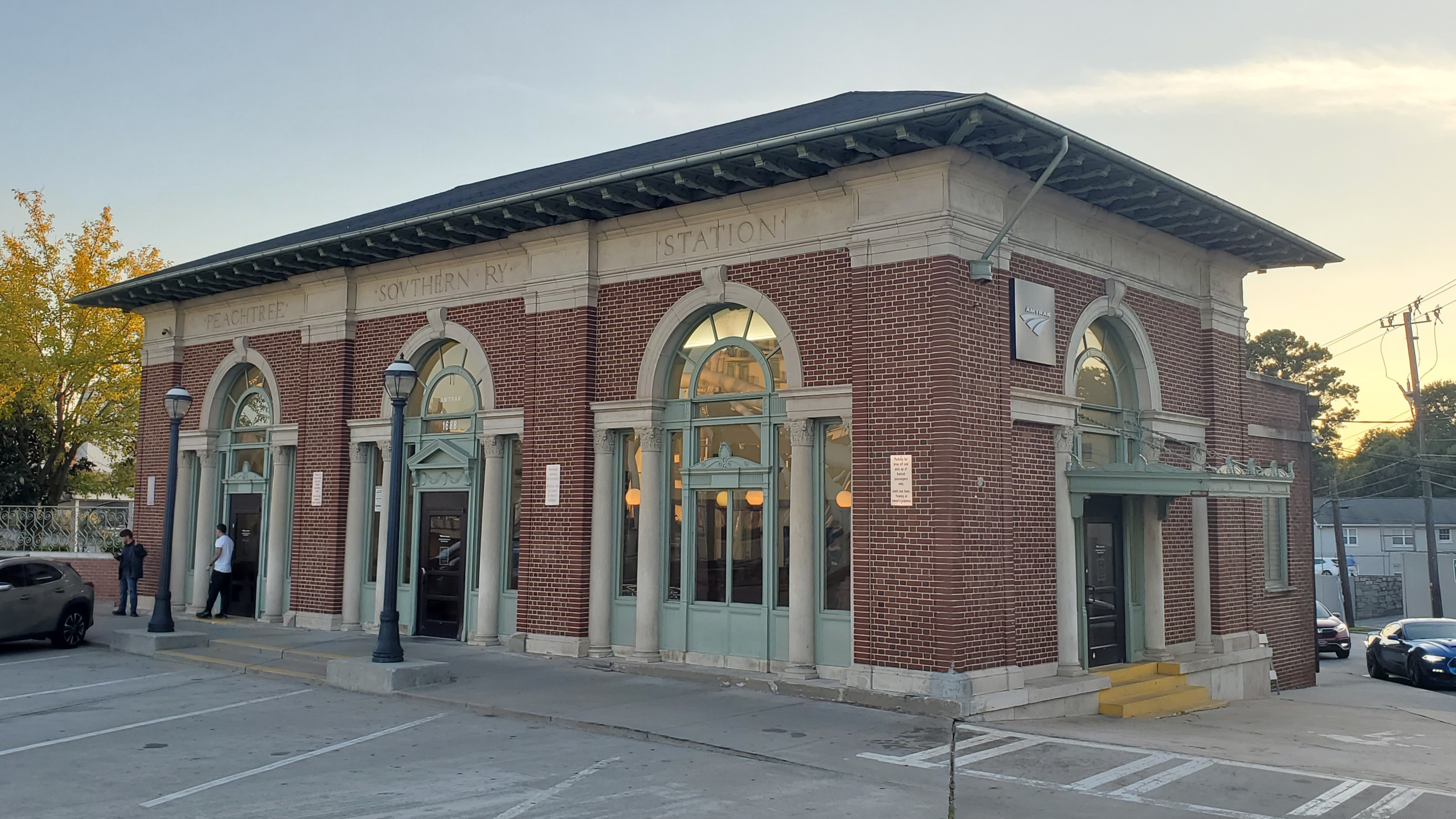
- Exterior of the station, 2022

General information
- Location: 1688 Peachtree Road, N.W. Atlanta, Georgia; United States
- Coordinates: 33.79938°N 84.39275°W
- Owner: Norfolk Southern Railway
- Platforms: 1 side platform, 1 island platform
- Tracks: 2
- Connections: MARTA: 110 & 23

Construction
- Parking: Yes; Paid; Limited
- Cycle facilities: No
- Accessible: Yes

Other information
- Station code: Amtrak: ATL

History
- Opened: March 17, 1918

Passengers
- FY 2025: 86,040 (Amtrak)

Services
Preceding station	Amtrak	Following station
Anniston toward New Orleans	Crescent	Gainesville toward New York
Former services
Preceding station	Southern Railway	Following station
Atlanta Terminal toward Birmingham	Main Line	Oghethorpe University toward Washington, D.C.
- Peachtree Southern Railway Station
- U.S. National Register of Historic Places
- Architect: Hentz, Reid & Adler
- Architectural style: Renaissance
- NRHP reference No.: 76000628
- Added to NRHP: September 14, 1976
Location

Peachtree Station is a train station in Atlanta, Georgia. It is a service stop for Amtrak's Crescent passenger train. The street address is 1688 Peachtree Road, Northwest, in the Brookwood section of the city between Buckhead and Midtown.

== Services ==
Peachtree Station is served by the Amtrak Crescent route with one train in each direction per day. The southbound #19 arrives at 8:43am and the northbound #20 arrives at 11:00pm.

== History ==
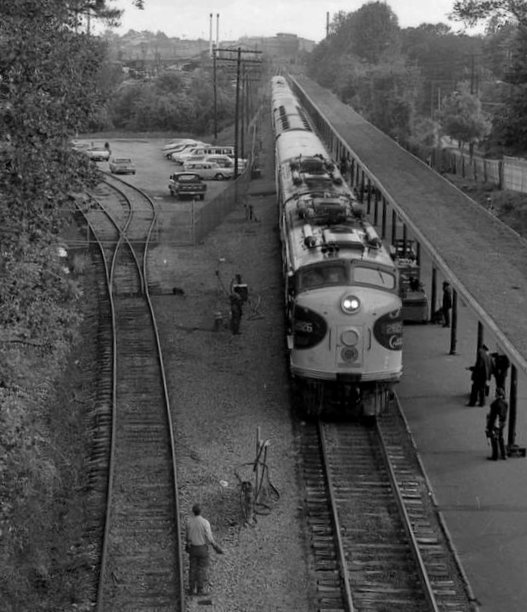
Peachtree Station in Atlanta, Georgia, c. 1974

It was designed by architect Neel Reid, and built in 1918, as a commuter stop on the north side of Atlanta for the Southern Railway whose main stop was Terminal Station downtown. The new station was formally named Peachtree Station by Southern; informally it was widely referred to as Brookwood Station. Its role was roughly analogous to Boston's Back Bay station.

Amid a long decline in passenger rail service, Southern closed Terminal Station in 1970 and moved most of its services to the smaller Peachtree Station (though the Nancy Hanks continued to use a makeshift platform and ticket office near Terminal Station until it ended in 1971). That same year, the statue of Samuel Spencer was relocated from Terminal Station to Peachtree station, where it stayed until 1996. When Union Station closed in 1971 with the start of Amtrak, Peachtree Station became the only passenger station in Atlanta still open.

Southern was one of the few major railroads to stay in the passenger business when Amtrak launched. However, the three-decade decline in passenger service culminated in 1975, when Southern cut back service to a single train, what was then the Southern Crescent. It was the first time in Atlanta's railroad history that it was only served by just one train. Southern finally got out of the passenger business in 1979 and turned the Crescent over to Amtrak. Southern then leased Peachtree station to Amtrak, a lease maintained after Southern merged into Norfolk Southern.

== Architecture ==
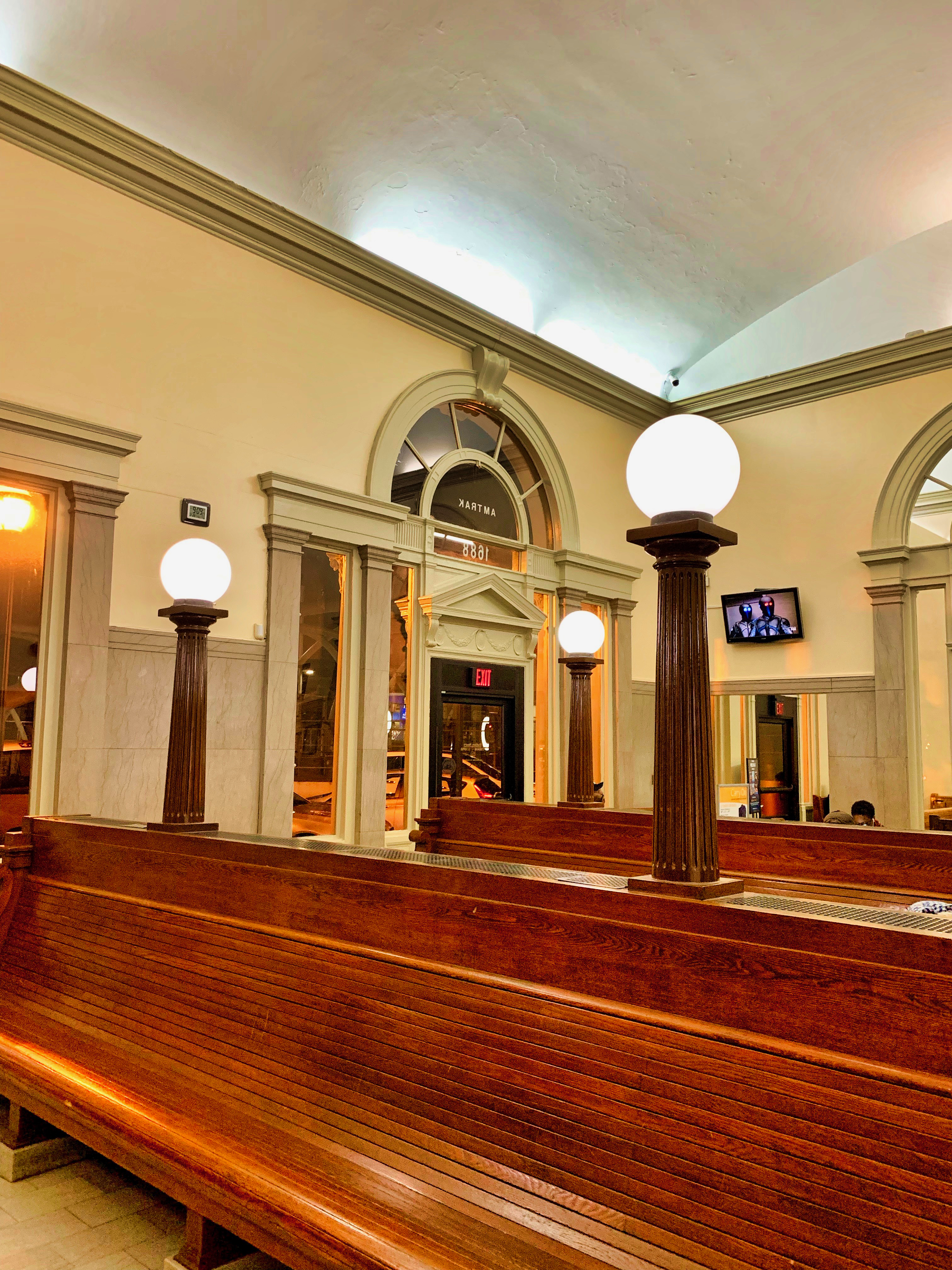
The interior waiting room of Amtrak's Peachtree station in Atlanta

The depot was designed in an Italian Renaissance style of architecture, featuring Palladian windows and classical elements such as pilasters and a molded entablature.

Amtrak passengers often note that the station is small and is elevated far above the tracks, requiring use of a long stairway or elevator. This design reflects the original intent of the station as a suburban stop and the much smaller size of Atlanta at the turn of the 20th century.

The interior of the station underwent an extensive remodeling in preparation for the 1996 Summer Olympics, held in Atlanta.

== Possible replacement ==
There have been proposals for a new Amtrak station in downtown. In April 2011, the city of Atlanta submitted an application for a grant seeking $22.5 million to relocate the station approximately 1 mile (1.6 km) south to Northside Drive and 17th Street, near the multi-use community of Atlantic Station. However, the deal fell through, and the property instead sold to Fuqua Development.

In November 2011, the Georgia Department of Transportation signed a $12.2 million contract with Cousins Properties, The Integral Group, and Forest City Enterprises to develop plans for a new station in The Gulch area near Five Points, close to the former site of the Terminal station. This station is intended to serve as a hub not only for Amtrak, but for MARTA, intercity buses, and the proposed commuter rail lines as well.

Amtrak continued to negotiate with MARTA, Norfolk Southern, CSX, the City of Atlanta, and GDOT as it explores options for replacing its facility. Among the options currently under consideration is the site of the former General Motors assembly plant adjacent to the Doraville MARTA station.

== See also ==
- Atlanta Union Station (1930)
- Terminal Station (Atlanta)
