= Monroe station (North Carolina) =

Defunct train station in North Carolina

Monroe

General information
- Other names: Seaboard Air Line Railroad Depot
- Location: 100 Smith Street; Monroe, North Carolina; United States
- Coordinates: 34°59′07″N 80°33′01″W
- Owner: CSX
- Line: Seaboard Air Line Railroad
- Platforms: 1
- Tracks: 1

Construction
- Architectural style: Queen Anne

History
- Opened: 1874
- Closed: October 14, 1969
- Rebuilt: 1906

Former services
Preceding station	Seaboard Air Line Railroad	Following station
Indian Trail toward Rutherfordton	Carolina Central Railroad	Wingate toward Wilmington
Mineral Springs toward Birmingham	Birmingham – Monroe	Terminus
Location

The Seaboard Air Line Railroad depot in Monroe, Union County, North Carolina, United States, is a former train station formerly used by the Seaboard Air Line Railroad from 1874 to 1969.

== History ==
Train service to Monroe began in 1874 when the Carolina Central Railway between Charlotte and Wilmington was completed. This made Monroe a market town where agricultural products were sold and shipped from the North to the South and vice versa. Due to the agricultural trade, it made Monroe a very important town and junction on the railroad along with the supply lines. In 1892, construction of the Georgia, Carolina and Northern Railway to Atlanta made new connections to other cities.

== Current station building ==
In 1906, the Seaboard Air Line Railroad made 2 new depots for Monroe. It included the current station building that was constructed with pressed brick, terra cotta panels, Ornate chimneys and Queen Anne style architecture window slashes. A new freight depot was also built but sadly no longer exists.

== Trains that stopped here ==
- Cotton Blossom
- Passenger Mail and Express
- Silver Comet

== Decline and present ==
Ever since the 1950s rail passenger service has been in decline due to new interests such as the car and plane. One such event came in 1958 when the Charlotte-Wilmington local train on the route serving the station was discontinued. In the 1960s, rail traffic even declined more across the United States. The final blow came on October 14, 1969 when the Silver Comet was discontinued. After the Silver Comet ended passenger services to Monroe, the station was still used as a yard office for the railroad and still maintains that usage to this date. Currently, CSX owns the station building after acquiring the former SAL routes through the merger of the Seaboard System and the Chessie System.
