= Royal Palm (train) =

Defunct American long-distance train

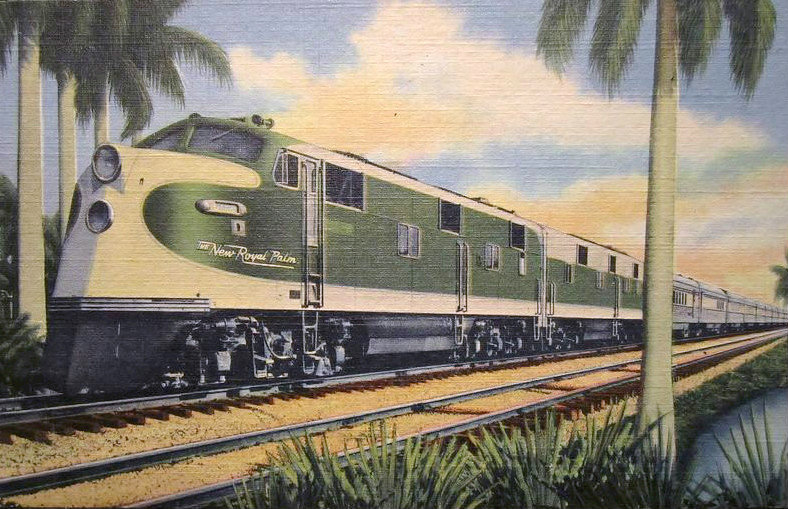
- Postcard depiction of the New Royal Palm

Overview
- Service type: Inter-city rail
- Status: discontinued
- Locale: Midwestern United States/Southeastern United States
- Last service: 1970
- Former operator(s): Southern Railway

Route
- Termini: Cincinnati, Ohio; Miami, Florida
- Distance travelled: 1,205.7 miles (1,940.4 km)
- Average journey time: 32 hours (southbound), 33 hours, 54 minutes (northbound)
- Service frequency: Daily
- Train number(s): 3 (southbound), 4 (northbound)

On-board services
- Seating arrangements: coach
- Sleeping arrangements: Roomettes and double bedrooms
- Catering facilities: dining-lounge

The Royal Palm was a named train of the Southern Railway that ran from Cincinnati, Ohio, to Jacksonville, Florida, and then on the Florida East Coast Railway's East Coast Champion to Miami, Florida. The train was discontinued in 1970.

== Operations ==
The Royal Palm provided connections with the New York Central Railroad at Cincinnati for passengers headed to Detroit, Cleveland and St. Louis. The Pennsylvania Railroad from Cincinnati provided a connection to Chicago. A through sleeper and coach between Miami and Detroit operated until 1957. The Florida East Coast Railway operated the Jacksonville to Miami section of the route, on the FEC's #5 train south and #6 train north. From Jacksonville to St. Petersburg the Seaboard Air Line operated that alternate section of the train on the SAL's Silver Meteor.

The Royal Palm operated overnight between Atlanta and Jacksonville and during daylight hours to the north to Cincinnati. The Ponce de Leon alternated with the Royal Palm on a reverse schedule between Cincinnati and Jacksonville, and the heavyweight companion was actually just as fast as the Palm during the 1950s and 1960s.

The Royal Palm (Train #3) departed from Cincinnati going south via the Cincinnati, New Orleans and Texas Pacific Railway to Chattanooga, Tennessee, then on Southern's former East Tennessee, Virginia & Georgia main on to Atlanta, Georgia, and Macon, Georgia, then via the Georgia Southern & Florida to Jacksonville, Florida.

== History ==
=== Train accident ===
The Ponce de Leon and Royal Palm collided on December 23, 1926, in Rockmart, Georgia. The northbound Ponce de Leon struck the Royal Palm, killing 19 people and injuring 133 others, most on the Ponce de Leon.

The collision was the subject of the song "The Wreck of the Royal Palm", which was written by Andrew Jenkins and recorded by Vernon Dalhart in 1927.

=== Post-war winter schedule ===
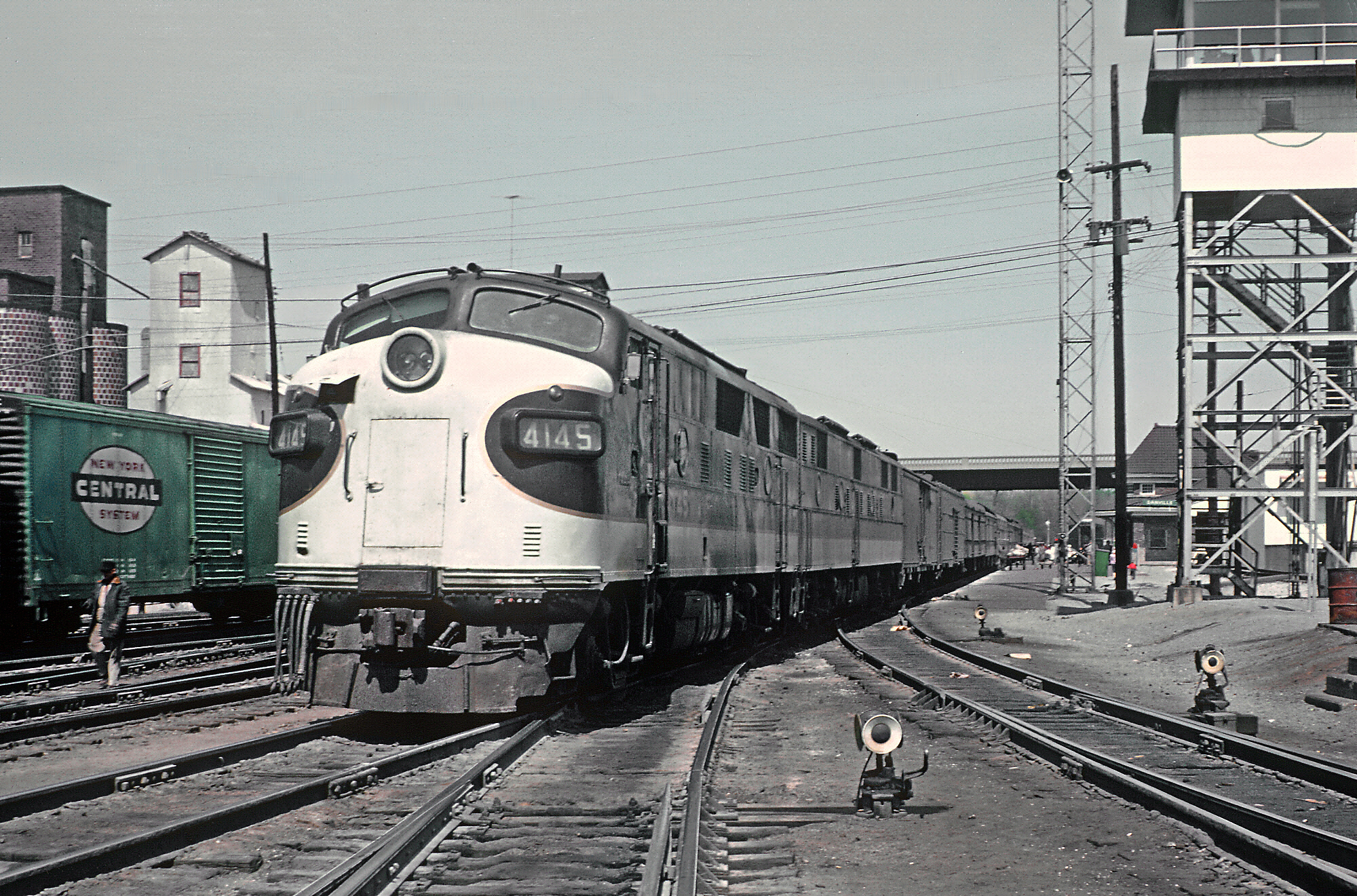
The Royal Palm at Danville, KY station on April 11, 1963.

In 1949, an order for twelve EMD E7s was delivered to Southern Railway for use on its passenger trains. On December 15, 1949, the New York Central, Southern and Florida East Coast began operation of the streamlined New Royal Palm winter-only train that replaced the Florida Sunbeam, which had run down Southern's (GS&F) Palatka branch to Hampton, where it connected to the Seaboard to Miami.

The New Royal Palm was a Detroit-Miami streamliner which carried through-sleepers for Chicago, Cleveland and Buffalo. Each train carried up to 20 cars, including a dining car and tavern-lounge car. In the off-season, the equipment was used on the Royal Palm, where it was permanently assigned after the New Royal Palm ceased to operate in April 1955.

Stylish coaches provided by Southern and Florida East Coast featured spacious men's and women's smoking lounges and large color photo murals of Florida scenery on both bulkheads. Both trains carried an elegant Pullman-built split-level observation lounge car (with tall rear windows) for sleeping car passengers until 1957. (Click on Royal Street link below).

Coach passengers could socialize and relax in an intimate little bar-lounge next to the diner.

Until 1957 African-Americans were carried in the "colored" coach (RP-1), a combination baggage-coach behind the diesels. The dining car was segregated, and the coach-lounge was strictly off-limits to black passengers.

The train ceased operating south of Jacksonville in 1958, as reflected in the FEC and Southern timetables that year.

The amenities provided on the Royal Palm were gradually curtailed as Southern Railway attempted to reduce operating losses. The train was discontinued in segments - first between Jacksonville and Valdosta, Georgia, in 1966 when the diner and sleeper were dropped - but the Palm carried its coach-lounge right up to the end of its long career. However, passengers wishing to travel south of Valdosta could switch at Atlanta to take the Atlantic Coast Line Railroad's (and from 1967 to 1969, the Seaboard Coast Line Railroad's) Dixie Flyer to continue the trip to Jacksonville, as the SCL advertised on its timetable connections to the Southern's #3/#4 (The Royal Palm).

Ironically, the Royal Palm name was kept even though the train no longer served Florida, where royal palms thrived on the lower East Coast. In the summer of 1967, the two-car remnant of the once-proud sunliner was discontinued south of Atlanta, then the section between Somerset, Kentucky, and Dalton, Georgia, was cut, leaving two disconnected trains, which were finally discontinued in 1970.

The Southern Railway did not join Amtrak in 1971, at which time it had only four remaining passenger trains. These were the Southern Crescent, the Piedmont Limited, and two unnamed runs, one each in North Carolina and Virginia; the latter three were dropped in 1975.

The Southern Railway finally ended passenger operations on January 31, 1979, and joined Amtrak, with its only remaining train being the Crescent.
