= Seaboard Coastline Building =

- U.S. National Register of Historic Places
- Virginia Landmarks Register
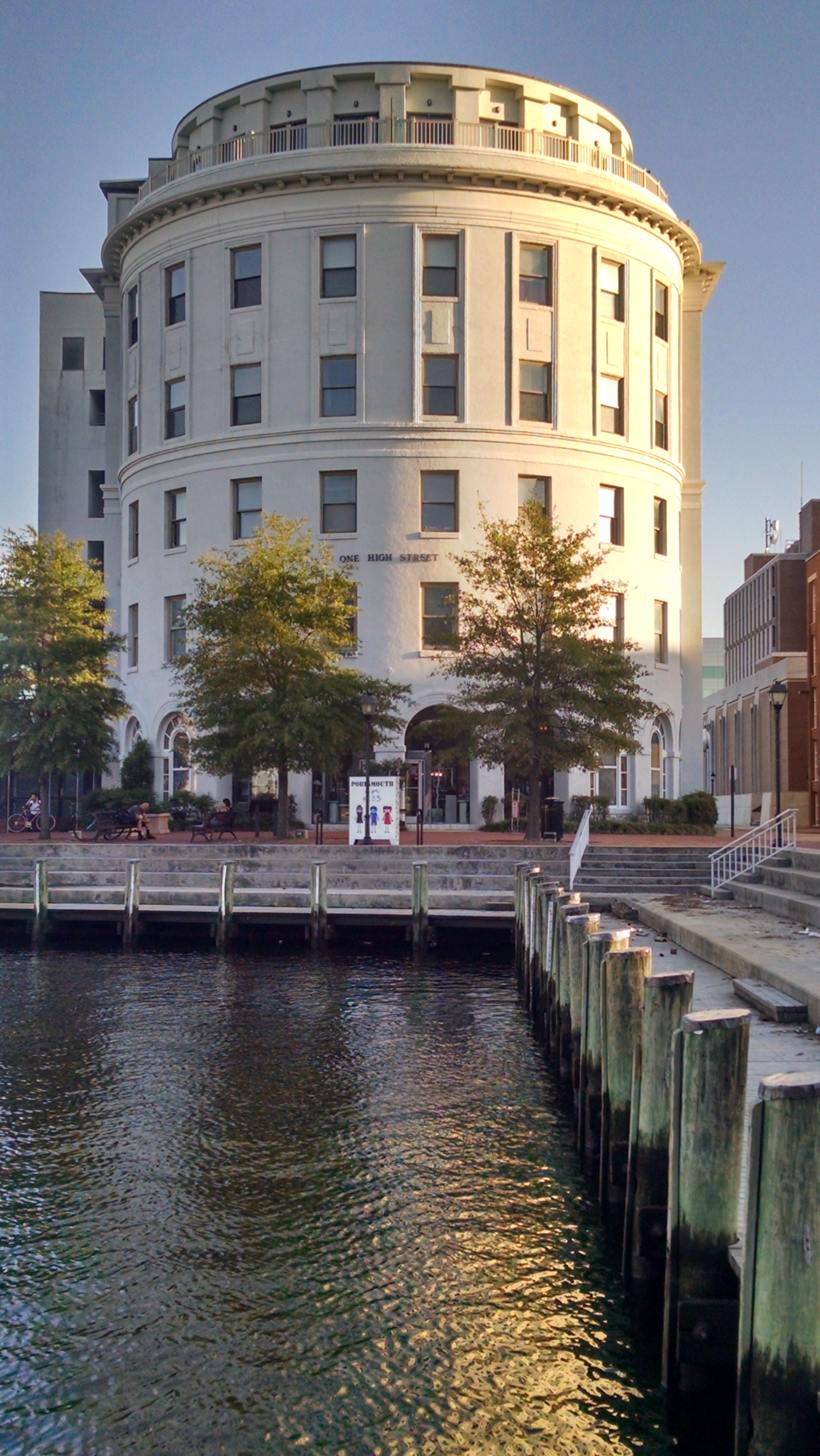

- Location within Virginia Location within the United States
- Location: 1 High St., Portsmouth, Virginia
- Coordinates: 36°50′5″N 76°17′49″W
- Area: 0.8 acres (0.32 ha)
- Built: 1894-1895, 1914
- Built by: Seaboard Air Line Railway
- NRHP reference No.: 85003129
- VLR No.: 124-0053

Significant dates
- Added to NRHP: October 10, 1985
- Designated VLR: August 13, 1985

Seaboard Coastline Building, also known as Old City Hall, is a historic train station located at Portsmouth, Virginia. The original section was built in 1894-1895 by the Seaboard Air Line Railroad. It is a six-story brick and concrete structure, with the 4th and 5th floors added in 1914. The front facade features a distinctive half-round or semicylindrical profile intended to recall the imagery of the streamlined locomotives of the late-19th century. The building served as the northern terminus and office headquarters of the Seaboard Air Line until 1958.

== Passenger train terminal ==
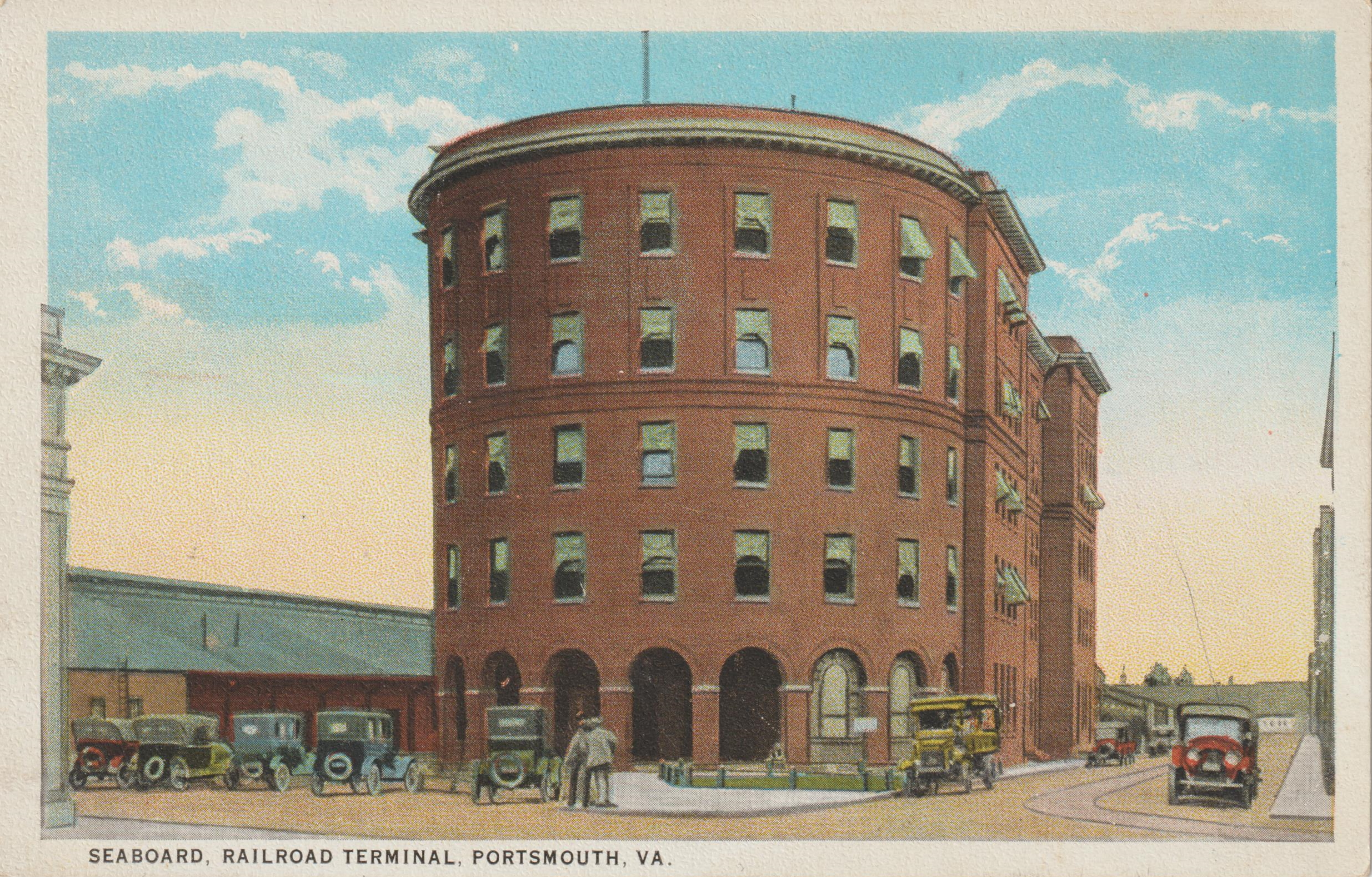
The terminal as a passenger station, circa 1920

The station served multiple passenger trains daily. One train was the Portsmouth section of the SAL's full service Silver Comet, bound for Raleigh, North Carolina, Athens and Atlanta in Georgia and Birmingham, Alabama. Another train, #3-11 southbound/#6-10 northbound, was a coach-only train to Atlanta, making local stops along the way. The Silver Comet had its last trip into the station in 1968, when the SAL's successor, the merged Seaboard Coast Line, terminated passenger service on the branch leading into Portsmouth.

== Use in recent years ==
After the building was used for railroad purposes, it was used as the municipal building until 1980. It was listed on the National Register of Historic Places in 1985.

Preceding station	Seaboard Air Line Railroad	Following station
Purvis toward Norlina	Norlina-Portsmouth	Terminus
