= West Point Route =

Railroad in the Southern United States

The West Point Route was actually a nickname used in the early 20th century for the joint operations of the Atlanta and West Point Railroad and the Western Railway of Alabama. The name refers to the city of West Point, Georgia, where the two railroads met.

Until the 1960s, the route carried Southern Railway passenger trains, such as the Crescent and the Piedmont Limited on New York to New Orleans service. By the latter 1960s, the Crescent was the only remaining passenger train. In 1970, the Crescent was rerouted on its present-day more northwestern route, through Birmingham.

Major station stops, southwest from Atlanta's Terminal Station were in Georgia: Newman, LaGrange, West Point, in Alabama: Opelika, Auburn, Chehaw and Montgomery. Coach-only trains made additional station stops. Passenger trains continued west beyond Montgomery to Mobile and New Orleans on the Louisville and Nashville Railroad.
