= Statue of Samuel Spencer =

Monument in Georgia, United States

Samuel Spencer statue
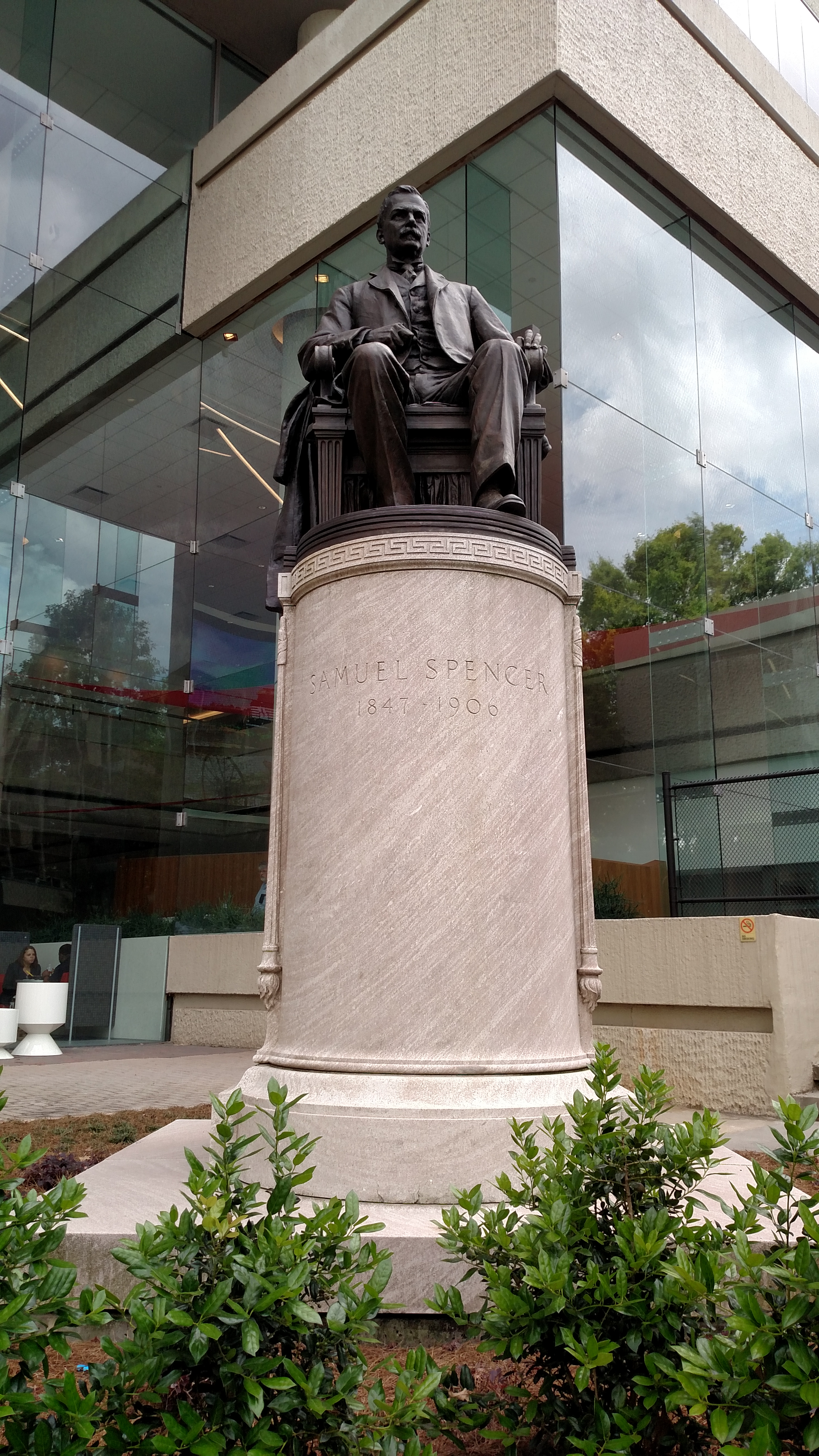
- Samuel Spencer statue (2015)
- Location: 130 W Paces Ferry Rd NW, Atlanta, Georgia
- Designer: Henry Bacon; Daniel Chester French
- Fabricator: Piccirilli Brothers
- Dedicated date: May 21, 1910
- Dedicated to: Samuel Spencer

The Samuel Spencer statue is a public monument in Atlanta, Georgia. Dedicated in 1910, the monument was designed by Daniel Chester French, Henry Bacon, and the Piccirilli Brothers and honors Samuel Spencer, a railroad executive who died in 1906. The statue, initially located in front of Atlanta's Terminal Station, was moved several times over the next several decades, including Norfolk Southern's headquarters in midtown Atlanta. In 2023, it was relocated to the Atlanta History Center and remained there on display ever since.

== History ==
Samuel Spencer was a railroad executive who served as the first president of Southern Railway, which eventually became Norfolk Southern Railway in 1982. He died in the early morning of Thanksgiving 1906 in a train wreck. Following this, over 30,000 employees of the Southern Railway donated money to commission a statue honoring their late president. The statue was designed by Henry Bacon, Daniel Chester French, and the Piccirilli Brothers and was unveiled on May 21, 1910, in front of Terminal Station in Atlanta, Georgia. Five years after this statue's unveiling, these individuals would again collaborate on the statue of Abraham Lincoln at the Lincoln Memorial, which also features a seated figure.

The statue was initially located near the front entrance of Terminal Station, where it would remain until the station closed in June 1970. Following this, the statue was moved several times to locations throughout Atlanta. On July 3, 1970, the statue was rededicated outside of Peachtree station in the Brookwood neighborhood of Atlanta. It remained there until May 1996, when, in preparation for the 1996 Summer Olympics in Atlanta, the statue was moved to Hardy Ivy Park in downtown Atlanta. The monument was moved for the third time on May 30, 2009, to a plaza in front of Norfolk Southern's offices, located along Peachtree Street in midtown Atlanta. But when Norfolk Southern moved into its new Atlanta headquarters building in 2021, they removed the monument since Spencer is a former Confederate soldier. In December 2023, the monument could be found at the Atlanta History Center.

== See also ==
- 1910 in art
- Public sculptures by Daniel Chester French
