= Atlanta and West Point Railroad =

Defunct American railway company

Atlanta and West Point Rail Road

Overview
- Headquarters: Atlanta, Georgia
- Reporting mark: AWP
- Locale: Georgia
- Dates of operation: 1847–1983
- Successor: Seaboard System

Technical
- Track gauge: 4 ft 8 1/2 in (1,435 mm) standard gauge
- Previous gauge: originally built as 5 ft (1,524 mm) and changed to 4 ft 9 in (1,448 mm) in 1886

The Atlanta and West Point Rail Road (reporting mark AWP) was a railroad in the U.S. state of Georgia, forming the east portion of the Atlanta-Selma West Point Route. The company was chartered in 1847 as the Atlanta and LaGrange Rail Road and renamed in 1857; construction of the 5 ft (1,524 mm) gauge line was begun in 1849–50 and completed in May 1854. A large minority interest owned by the Georgia Railroad and Banking Company eventually passed under the control of the Atlantic Coast Line Railroad (ACL), which later acquired a majority of the stock in November, 1902.

In the late 20th century restructuring, through the Seaboard Coast Line Railroad (SCL), successor to the ACL, the A&WP came under the Family Lines System banner in 1972. Years later in June 1983, it was merged into the Seaboard System Railroad, successor to the SCL. The former A&WP property is now owned by CSX Transportation.

In 1967 A&WP reported 232 million revenue ton-miles of freight and 3 million passenger-miles on 93 miles (150 km) of road operated.

== History ==
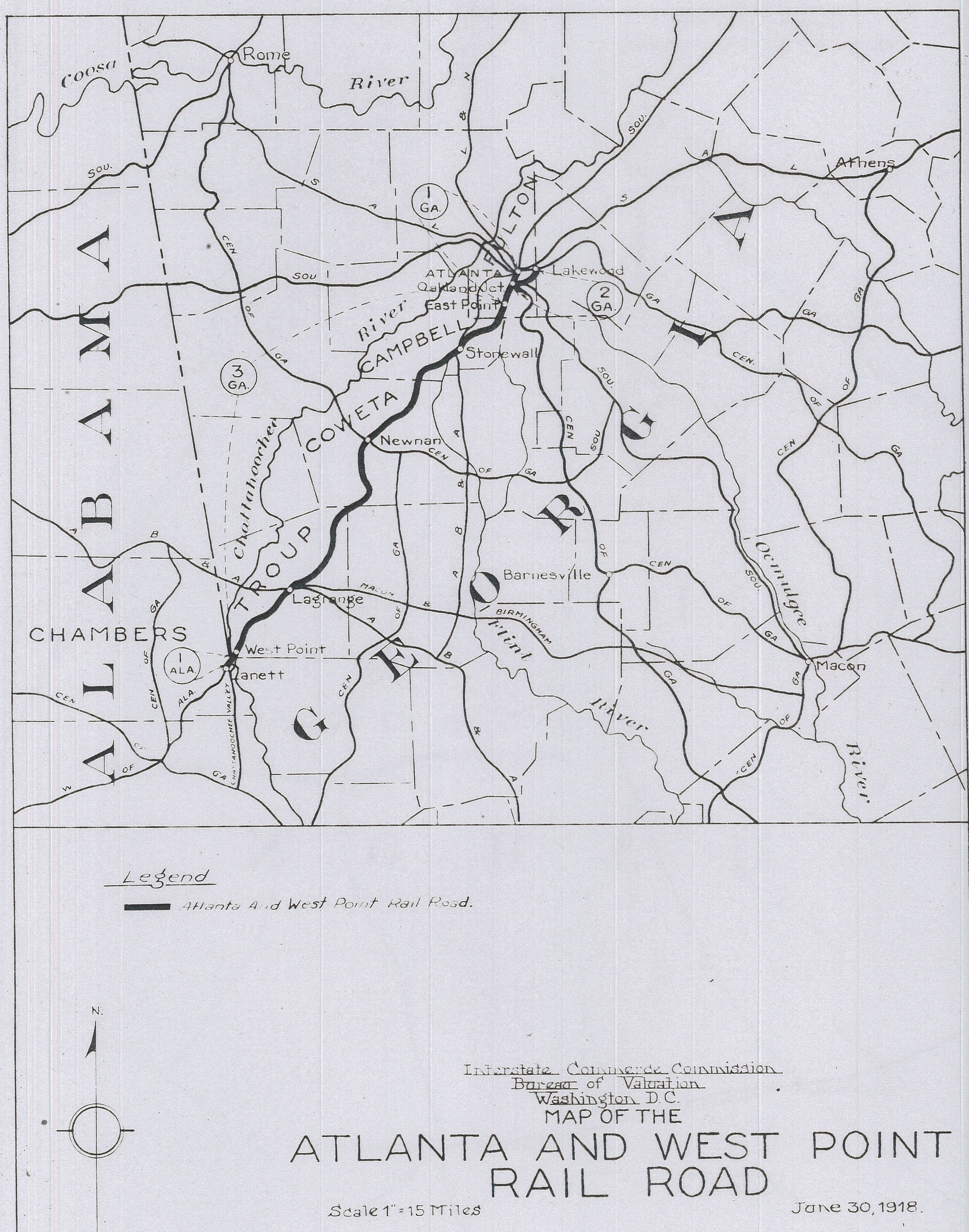
1918 map of the railroad

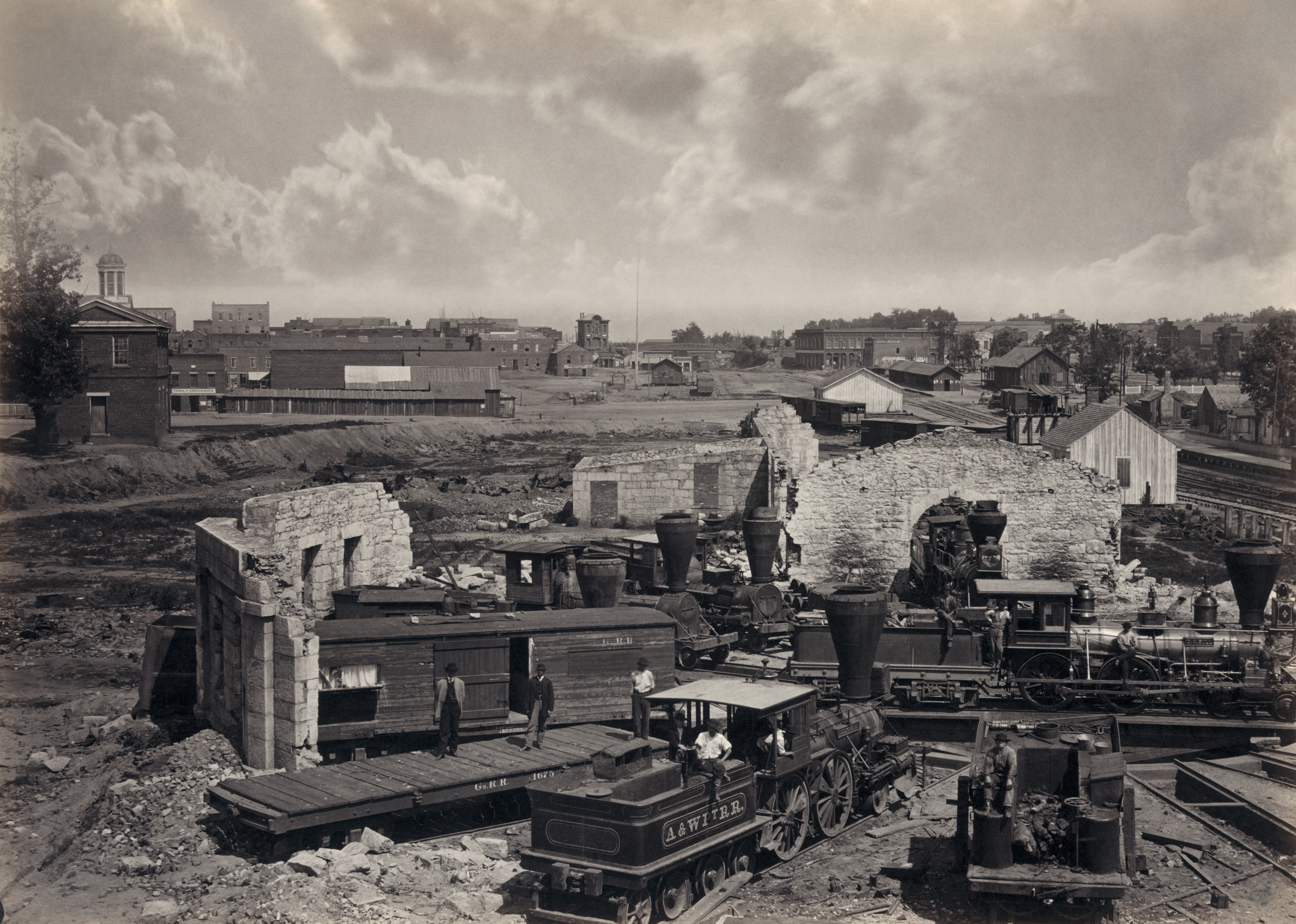
A 4-4-0 locomotive of the A. & WPT. R. R. (foreground) in the ruined roundhouse of Atlanta, Georgia shortly after the end of the Civil War. (All other rolling stock either without identifyable marking or Ga. R. R.)

The AWP and the Western Railway of Alabama had financial backing from the parent company of the Georgia Railroad and Banking Company. From 1886 onward the AWP and the Western operated essentially as one railroad under the name "West Point Route". In the 19th and early 20th centuries, the three were controlled through joint lease by the Central of Georgia Railroad and the Louisville and Nashville Railroad (through assignment by its majority owner, the Atlantic Coast Line Railroad).

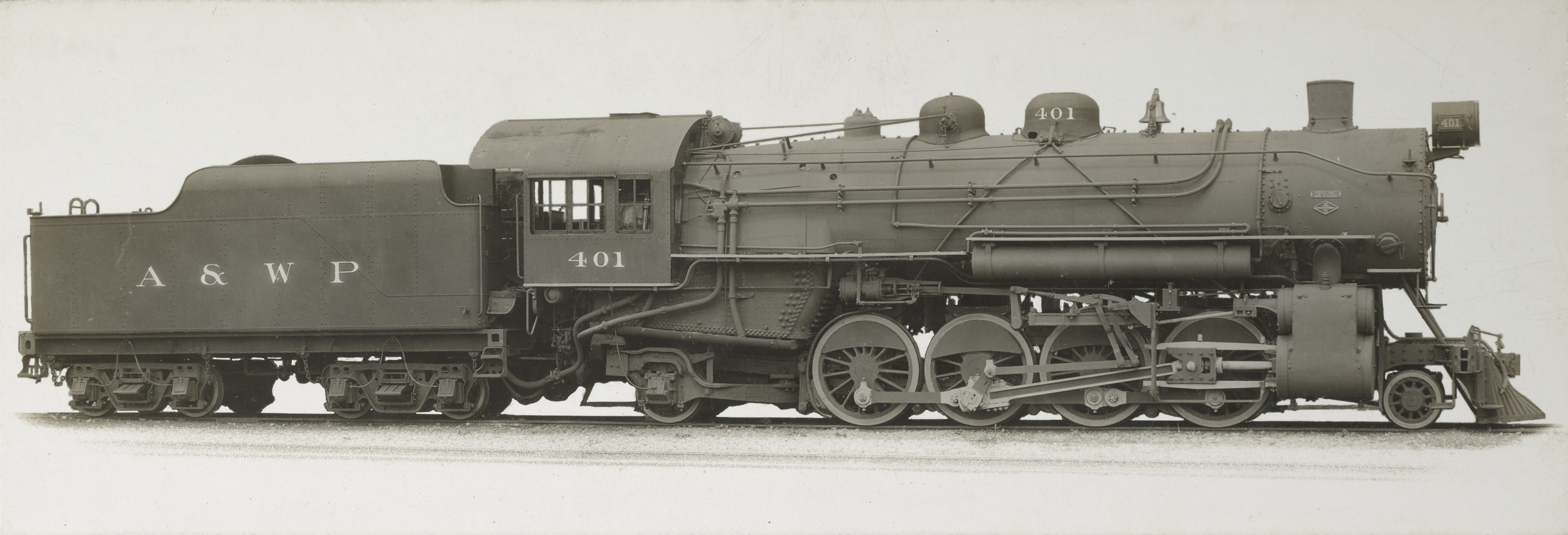
A AWP Mikado at Lima plant in 1918.

The CofG sold its interest in 1944. The lines eventually fell under the control of the Seaboard Coast Line Railroad, as a result of a merger between the Atlantic Coast Line and the Seaboard Air Line. All of these lines, plus the Clinchfield Railroad, became the Family Lines System in the 1970s, though all the lines maintained separate corporate identities. Those identities became "fallen flags" when the group was renamed Seaboard System Railroad (SBD). In 1986 SBD merged with Chessie System to form CSX Transportation.

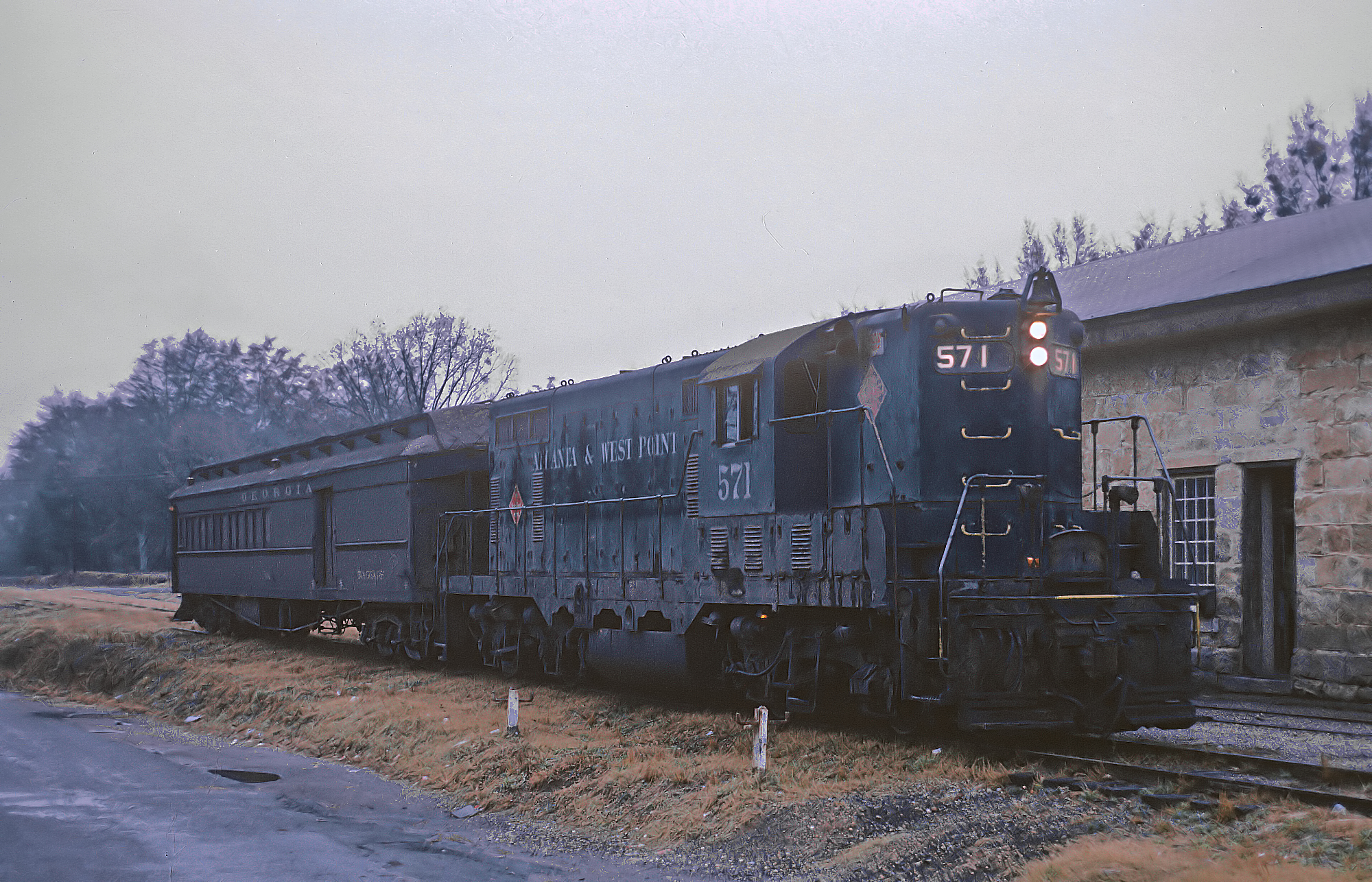
A short AWP passenger train at Crawford, GA, station on November 24, 1967

The former AWP line remains in full service today, although passenger service ended on January 7, 1970. This was 16 months before Amtrak took over most of the nation's long-distance passenger trains. (The Central of Georgia's Man o' War continued to operate for several more months over the A&WP rail line.) The Atlanta & West Point name ended in June 1983, when the railroad company was absorbed by the Seaboard System.

One of AWP's most notable steam locomotives, heavy Pacific AWP 290, survived and was restored to operational status in 1989. The 290 pulled steam excursions around Atlanta from 1989 to 1992 for the "New Georgia Railroad," including a special excursion from Atlanta to Montgomery along the original West Point Route.

== List of stations ==
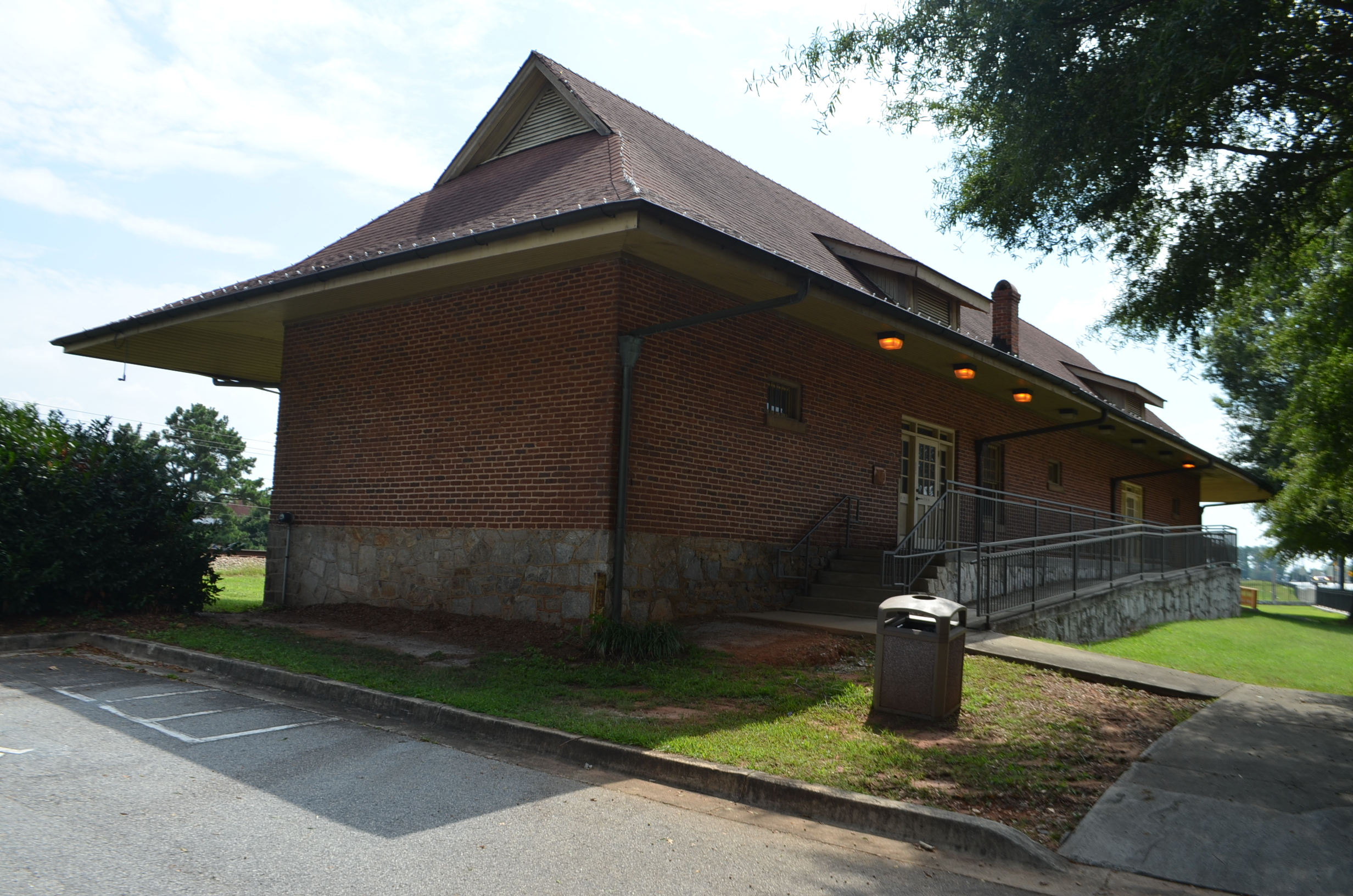
The preserved Fairburn station building in 2014

These stations existed as of 1867.

Name	Miles	Kilometers	Notes
East Point	7	11	Unknown
Fairburn	19	31	Unknown
Palmetto	25	40	completed on March 17, 1851
Powells	33	53	Unknown
Newnan	39	63	completed on September 9, 1851
Grantville	51	82	completed on June 1, 1852
Hogansville	58	93	Unknown
LaGrange	71	114	completed in February, 1853
Long Cane	80	130	Off Long Cane Road
West Point	86	138	completed on May 15, 1854

Trains departed from Atlanta at 12:15PM and arrived there at 8:37AM. West Point was the connecting point further west via the Montgomery and West Point Railroad.

== See also ==
- Lemuel P. Grant
- Atlanta and West Point 290
