= Nancy Hanks (train) =

Named passenger train in the United States

Nancy Hanks II
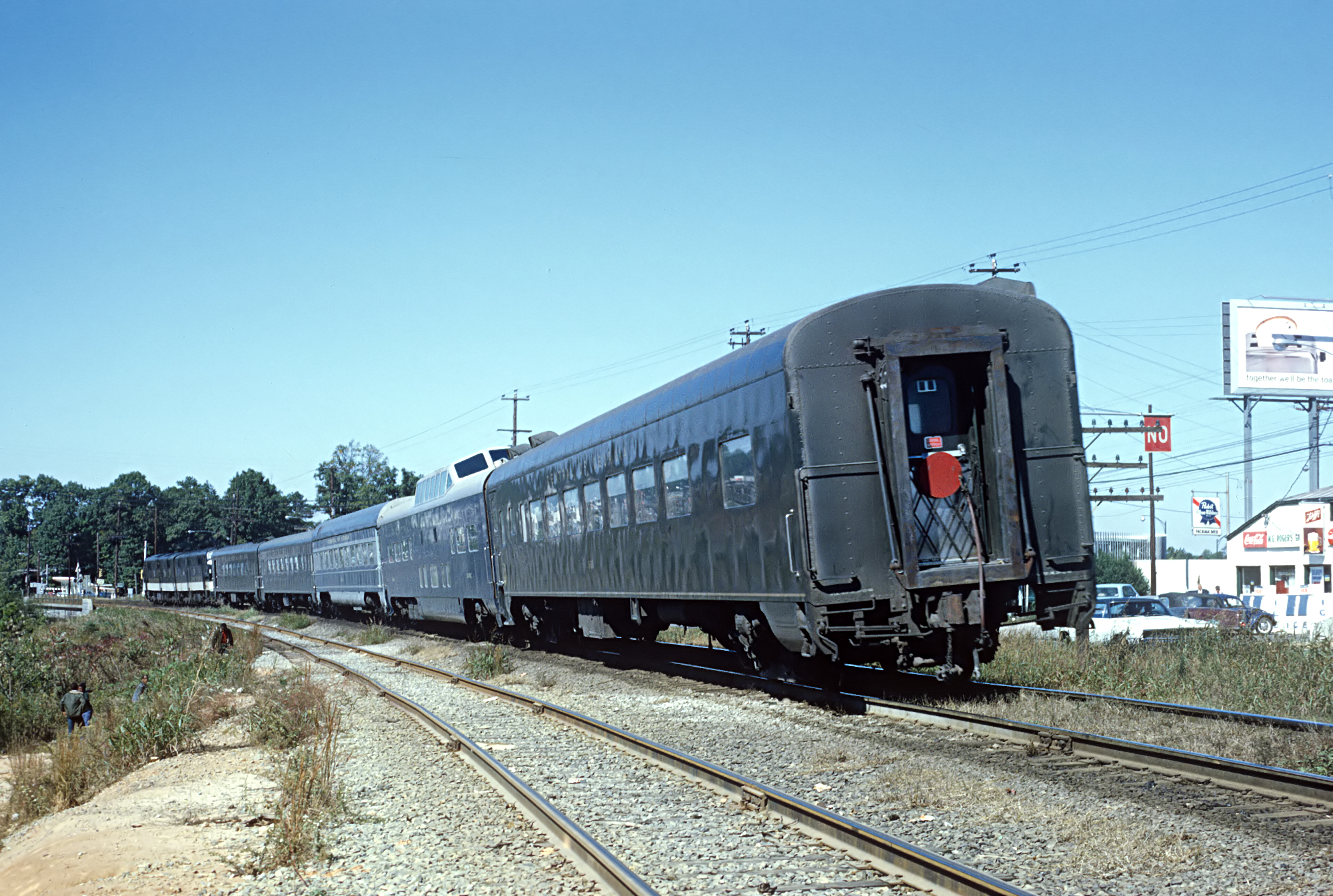
- The Nancy Hanks II near Atlanta in 1968

Overview
- Service type: Inter-city rail
- Status: Discontinued
- Locale: Georgia
- Predecessor: Nancy Hanks
- First service: July 17, 1947
- Last service: April 30, 1971
- Former operator: Central of Georgia Railway

Route
- Termini: Atlanta, Georgia; Savannah, Georgia
- Distance travelled: 293.7 miles (472.7 km)
- Average journey time: 6 hours (1954)
- Service frequency: Daily
- Train numbers: 108 (southbound), 107 (northbound)

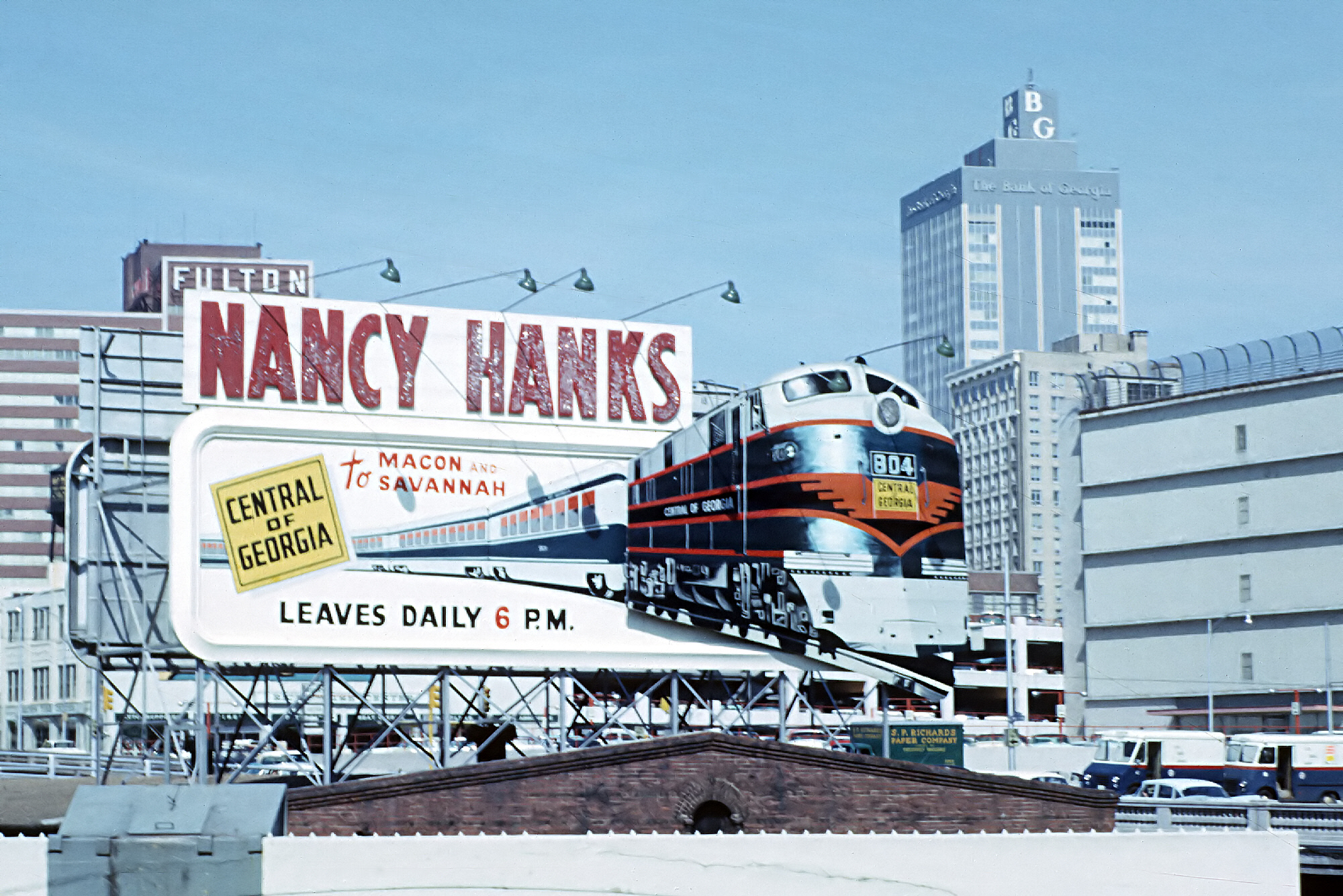
An advertisement for the Nancy Hanks II

The Nancy Hanks was a popular Central of Georgia Railway and later Southern Railway passenger train in Georgia running between Atlanta and Savannah. It was named after a race horse that was named for Abraham Lincoln's mother. The name is even older than the mid-20th century train derived from that of a short-lived but famous steam special, the Nancy Hanks. The earlier Nancy operated in 1892 and 1893.

== History ==
Nancy Hanks II made its first trip on July 17, 1947. The new train's cars were painted blue and gray and, like the first Nancy, each bore a likeness of the famed trotter on the side.

"The Nancy", as it was known, was an all-coach, reserved-seat train with grill lounge service. The train had an average speed of 48 mph (including stops) and made the 293.7 mi (472.7 km) journey in six hours. It left the Central of Georgia Depot in Savannah daily at 7 a.m., running to Atlanta Terminal Station, via Macon Terminal Station, and returning at 6 p.m.

In the 1960s the Central leased a dome car from the Norfolk and Western-Wabash line, where it had operated for a number of years; the car was thoroughly renovated for service on the Nancy Hanks II. The dome parlor-lounge car was 85 feet (26 m) long, made of steel and originally was built by Pullman-Standard. It had a dark-blue exterior and interior upholstery in royal blue and gray. In keeping with the racehorse theme, the lounge beneath the dome was branded the "Saddle & Stirrup."

Despite its popularity in Middle Georgia, the Nancy suffered a marked decline in ridership during the 1960s, in tandem with the larger decline of rail service during this period. While Southern opted to stay in the passenger business when Amtrak took over most passenger service, the Nancy was not among the routes retained. As a result, the Nancy made its last run on April 30, 1971, the day before Amtrak came into being. Atlanta's Terminal Station was demolished the following year.
