= Ponce de Leon (train) =

Overview
- Service type: Inter-city rail
- Status: Discontinued
- Locale: Midwestern United States/Southeastern United States
- First service: 1924
- Last service: mid-1960s
- Former operator(s): Southern Railway

Route
- Termini: Cincinnati, Ohio; Jacksonville, Florida
- Distance travelled: 840.2 mi (1,352.2 km)
- Service frequency: Daily
- Train number(s): Southbound: 1; northbound: 2

On-board services
- Seating arrangements: Reclining seat coaches
- Sleeping arrangements: Sections, drawing room, compartments
- Catering facilities: Restaurant-lounge

The Ponce de Leon was a named train of the Southern Railway which ran from Cincinnati, Ohio, to Jacksonville, Florida, from 1924 to the mid-1960s.

== Operations ==
The Ponce de Leon (Train #4) departed Jacksonville at midday going north via subsidiary Georgia Southern and Florida Railroad to Macon and Atlanta, Georgia, then on Southern's former East Tennessee, Virginia and Georgia Railroad line to Chattanooga, Tennessee, traveling overnight to Cincinnati via Southern subsidiary Cincinnati, New Orleans and Texas Pacific Railway. The train provided connections with the New York Central Railroad at Cincinnati for passengers headed to Detroit, Chicago, Cleveland, and Buffalo.

The Royal Palm alternated with the Ponce de Leon on a reverse schedule between Cincinnati and Jacksonville, operating during daylight hours south from Cincinnati and then overnight between Atlanta and Jacksonville. In the latter city there were connections with Florida East Coast Railway for an east coast trip to Miami, and Seaboard Air Line Railroad trains to Miami on an interior route to Tampa.

Sleepers were discontinued on the train in November 1959 and it ran as a coach-only consist until the end of operation.

In 1964, Southern Railway dropped the Atlanta - Jacksonville leg of the Ponce's operation.

By the time Southern Railway filed to discontinue the train on January 22, 1968 it was unnamed, operating as Numbers 1 and 2, but only between Cincinnati and Atlanta. The train finally disappeared from the timetable in March 1968.

== Train accident ==
The Ponce de Leon and Royal Palm collided on December 23, 1926 in Rockmart, Georgia. The northbound Ponce de Leon struck the Royal Palm with the result that 19 people were killed and 113 were injured, most on the Ponce de Leon.

The accident was also the subject of a song: "The Wreck of the Royal Palm" by Vernon Dalhart.

== See also ==
- Royal Palm (train)
