= Royal Palm Hotel =

Royal Palm Hotel has been the name of several hotels, including:

- Royal Palm Hotel (Detroit, Michigan), a Registered Historic Place
- Royal Palm Hotel (Havana)
- Royal Palm Hotel (Miami), an early 20th-century luxury hotel
