= Piedmont Limited =

American named passenger train

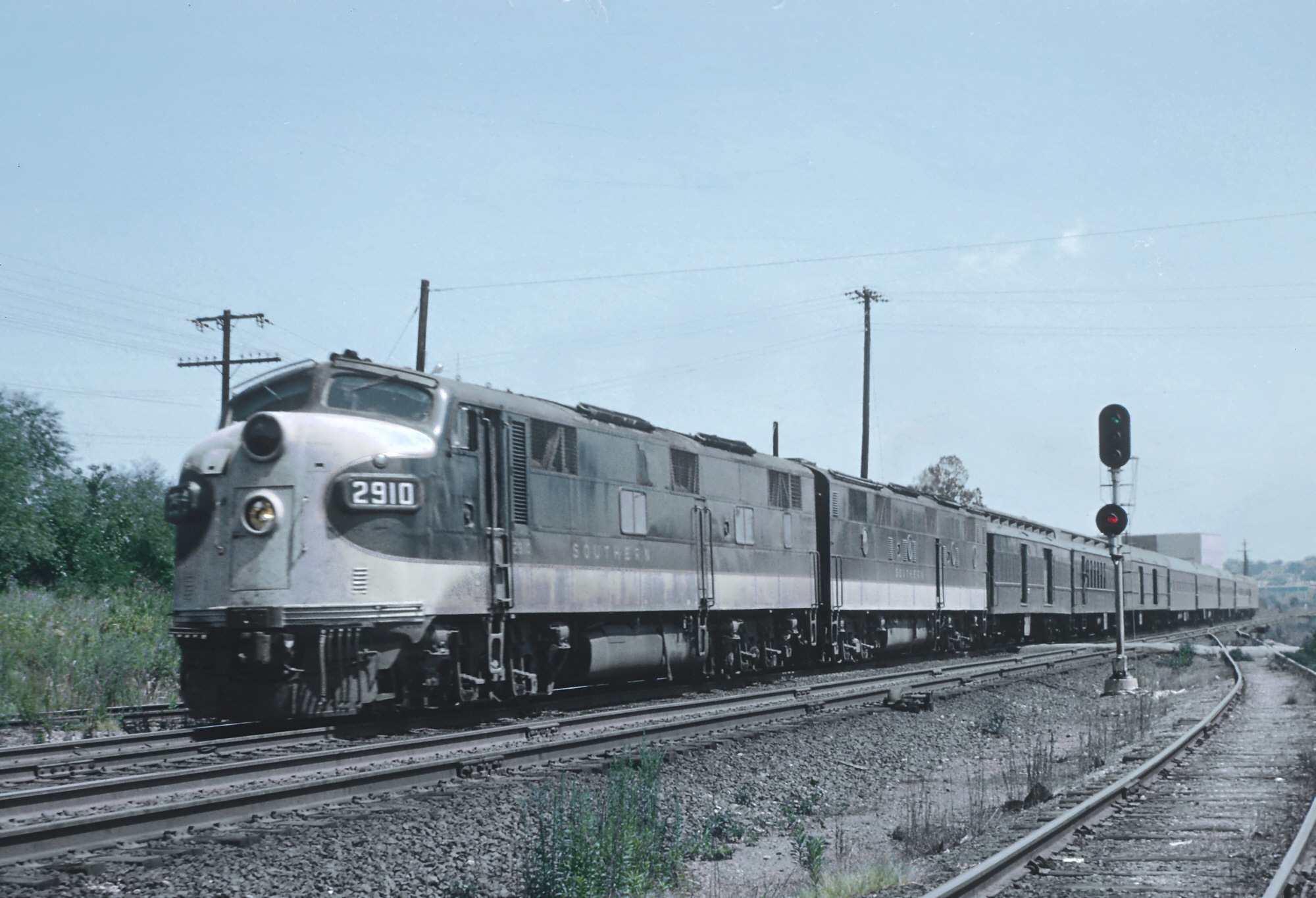
- The Piedmont Limited in Charlotte in 1962

Overview
- Service type: Inter-city rail
- Status: Discontinued
- Locale: Southeastern United States
- First service: March 12, 1899
- Last service: 1967
- Former operator: Southern Railway

Route
- Termini: New York, New York; New Orleans, Louisiana
- Service frequency: Daily
- Train numbers: 33 (southbound), 34 (northbound)

On-board services
- Seating arrangements: Reclining seat coaches
- Sleeping arrangements: Pullman open sections, roomettes and other closed rooms
- Catering facilities: Dining car
- Entertainment facilities: Lounge-coach with radio

The Piedmont Limited was a named passenger train operated by the Southern Railway in the southern United States. For most of its life it was a New York—New Orleans train, operating over the same route as the more famous Crescent Limited. The Southern Railway discontinued the Piedmont Limited in 1967 but re-used the name Piedmont a few years later for an Atlanta–Washington service.

== History ==
The Southern Railway introduced the train on March 12, 1899, and it was known as the crack train of the route until the introduction of the Crescent in 1925.

A section of the Piedmont served Birmingham, but this was eliminated by 1964. By the end of that year, the southbound itinerary of the route was cut from running from New York to New Orleans to having Kings Mountain, North Carolina, south of Charlotte, North Carolina as the southern terminus of the route. By late 1966, the train was running from Washington, D.C. to Salisbury, North Carolina in both directions. Amid the postwar decline in passenger rail service, the train was eliminated in 1967.

=== Piedmont ===
Beginning in 1970 the Piedmont name was revived for an Atlanta–Washington daytime service, supplementing the then-Southern Crescent along its middle leg. Southern did not join Amtrak in 1971, leaving the service as one of the few intercity rail routes in America which was not operated by the new quasi-government agency. In 1975, its southern terminus was truncated to Charlotte. This train was discontinued in 1976; by then its southern terminus had been cut back to Salisbury, North Carolina.

== Route details ==
In its prime the Piedmont Limited operated over the following roads:

- Pennsylvania Railroad: New York—Washington, D.C.
- Southern Railway: Washington—Atlanta, Georgia
- West Point Route: Atlanta—Montgomery, Alabama
- Louisville and Nashville Railroad: Montgomery—New Orleans

=== Major cities served ===
Aside from the above cited cities, the train served Newark, Philadelphia, Baltimore, Lynchburg, Charlottesville, Greensboro, Charlotte, Spartanburg, Greenville, Gainesville, Mobile and Gulfport.
