= Silver Comet (train) =

Former Seaboard Air Line Railroad service between New York City, NY and Birmingham, AL

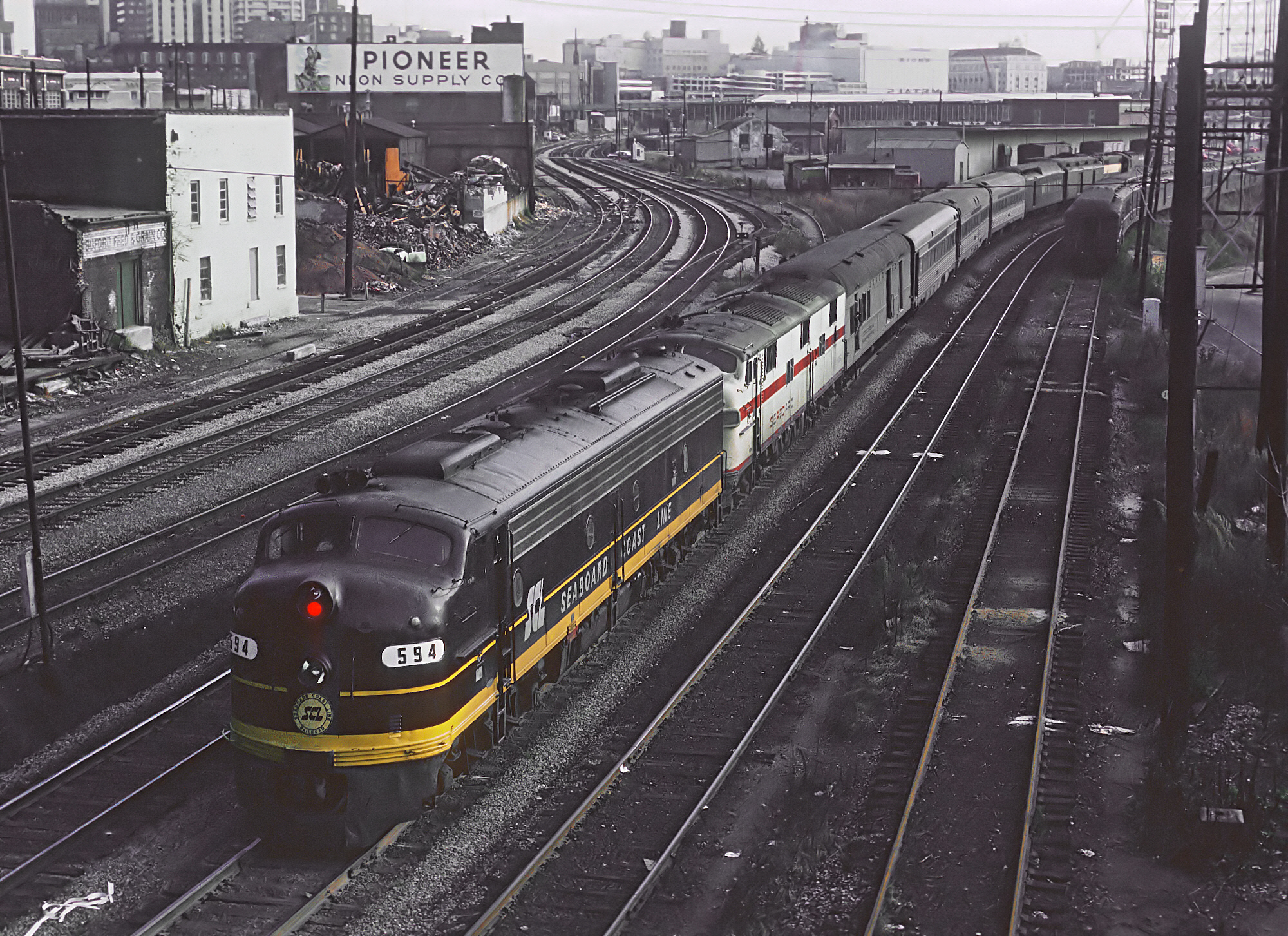
- The Silver Comet reversing into Atlanta Terminal Station in Atlanta in November 1967

Overview
- Service type: Inter-city rail
- Status: Defunct
- Locale: Eastern United States
- First service: May 18, 1947
- Last service: October 14, 1969
- Former operators: SAL (1947–1967); SCL (1967–1969)

Route
- Termini: New York City, U.S. Birmingham, Alabama, U.S.
- Distance travelled: 1,106.3 miles (1,780.4 km)
- Service frequency: Daily
- Train numbers: Southbound, 197-33 (PRR-SAL); Northbound, 34-196 (SAL-PRR)

On-board services
- Seating arrangements: Coaches
- Sleeping arrangements: Pullman sections, compartments, double bedrooms and drawing rooms
- Catering facilities: Dining car
- Observation facilities: Observation coach
- Baggage facilities: Baggage car

Technical
- Track gauge: 1,435 mm (4 ft 8 1/2 in)
- Track owners: PRR (New York–Washington); RFP (Washington–Richmond); SAL (Richmond–Birmingham)

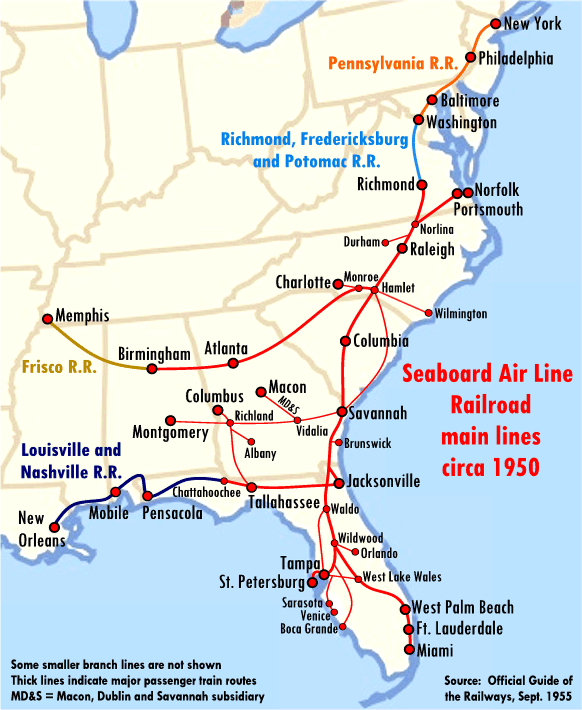
The 1955 routes of the Seaboard Air Line Railroad, including the Silver Comet from New York City to Birmingham, Alabama

The Silver Comet was a streamlined passenger train inaugurated on May 18, 1947, by the Seaboard Air Line Railroad (Seaboard Coast Line after merger with the Atlantic Coast Line on July 1, 1967). Before its inaugural run, the new train was christened by actress Jean Parker at Pennsylvania Station in New York City. The train succeeded the SAL's Cotton States Special, which took the same route and which like the Silver Comet left the northeast at midday and arrived at Birmingham in the late morning of the next day.

Daily service extended from New York City via Washington, D.C., Richmond, Virginia, Raleigh, North Carolina, and Atlanta to Birmingham, Alabama. From New York to Washington, the train was handled by the Pennsylvania Railroad; from Washington, D.C. to Richmond, by the Richmond, Fredericksburg and Potomac Railroad; and by Seaboard from Richmond to points south. Under its original schedule, the New York City to Birmingham trip took 23 hours at an average speed of 48 miles per hour.

The consist of the Silver Comet included baggage cars, coaches, Pullman sleepers, and a dining car between New York and Birmingham, along with through coaches and Pullmans to or from Portsmouth, Virginia, connecting at Raleigh, North Carolina. A 48-seat observation car brought up the rear of the train.

Owing to declining passenger and mail revenues, the Silver Comet was discontinued in stages in 1969: the last trip between Atlanta and Birmingham was made on January 18; between Washington and Richmond, May 7; and between Richmond and Atlanta, October 14. It lost its section that ran from Portsmouth's Seaboard Terminal in early 1968. The last through sleeper had run on December 31, 1968.

== See also ==
- Crescent, now operated by Amtrak, runs from New York City to New Orleans via Washington, D.C., Atlanta, and Birmingham, Alabama, a route partly parallel to that of the Silver Comet but over ex-Southern rails
- Silver Star, once operated by Amtrak, ran from New York City to Miami via Washington, D.C., Raleigh, Hamlet, North Carolina, and Columbia, South Carolina, a route partly parallel to that of the Silver Comet but over ex-Seaboard Air Line rails
