= Union Station (Meridian, Mississippi) =

Train station in Meridian, Mississippi, U.S.

Meridian, MS
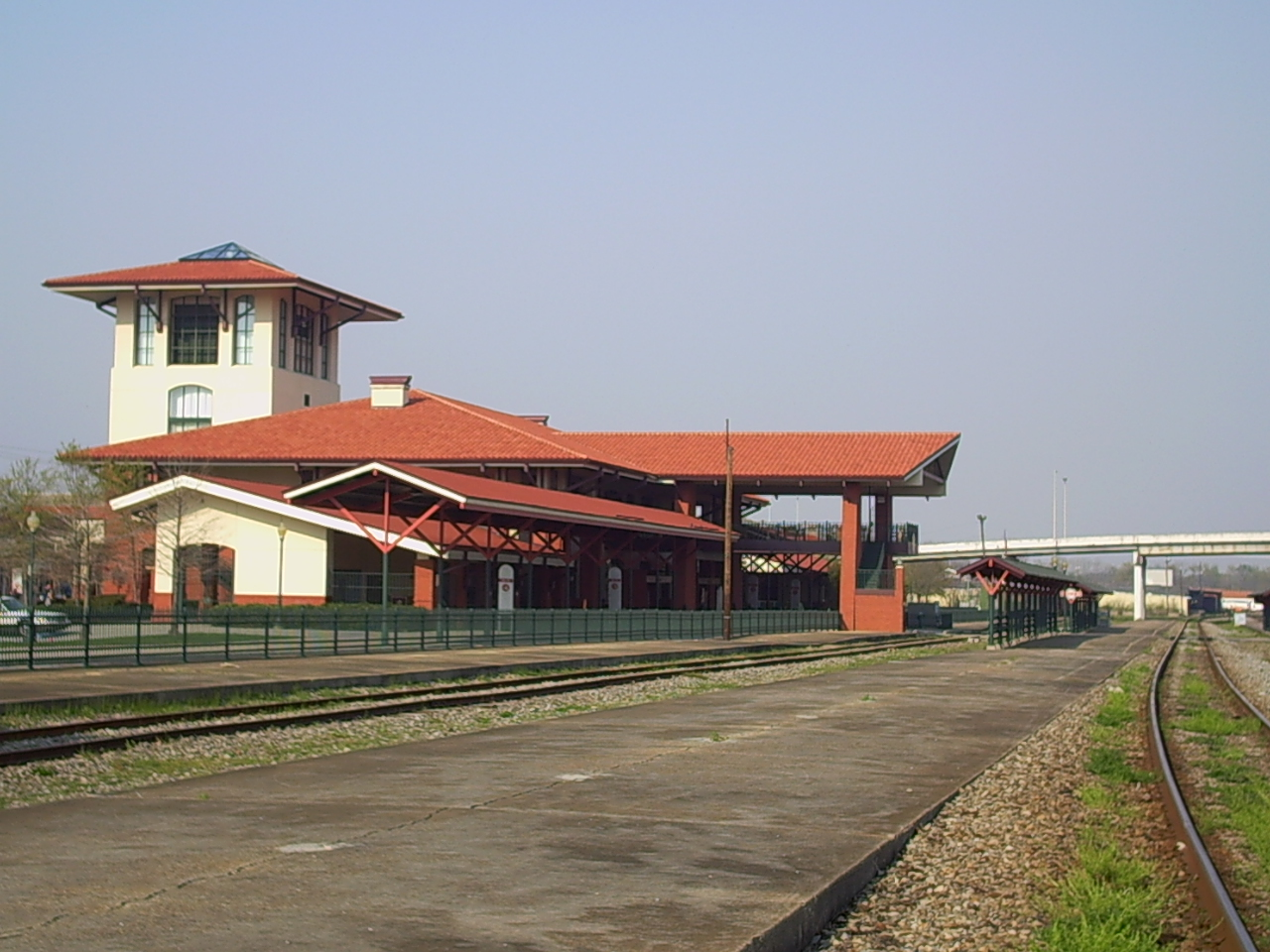

General information
- Other names: Meridian Multi-Modal Transportation Center; Union Station
- Location: 1901 Front Street; Meridian, Mississippi; United States
- Coordinates: 32.3639°N 88.6964°W
- Owner: City of Meridian
- Lines: Alabama Great Southern Railway; Meridian Speedway
- Platforms: 2 island platforms
- Tracks: 3 (2 in use)
- Connections: Amtrak Thruway; Greyhound Lines

Other information
- Status: Unstaffed
- Station code: Amtrak: MEI

History
- Rebuilt: December 1997

Passengers
- FY 2025: 8,932 (Amtrak)

Services
Preceding station	Amtrak	Following station
Laurel toward New Orleans	Crescent	Tuscaloosa toward New York
Former services
Preceding station	Gulf, Mobile and Ohio Railroad	Following station
Lauderdale toward Dyersburg	Dyersburg - Mobile	Quitman toward Mobile
Duffee toward New Orleans	New Orleans - Meridian	Terminus
Preceding station	Illinois Central Railroad	Following station
Lost Gap toward Shreveport	Vicksburg Route Division	Terminus
Preceding station	Southern Railway	Following station
Shops toward New Orleans	New Orleans – Cincinnati	Arklet toward Cincinnati
Proposed services
Preceding station	Amtrak	Following station
Jackson toward Fort Worth	Crescent Proposed Texas Section	Tuscaloosa toward New York
Location

Union Station, also called the Meridian Multi-Modal Transportation Center, is an intermodal transportation center in Meridian, Mississippi. The station is located at 1901 Front Street in the Union Station Historic District within the larger Meridian Downtown Historic District, both of which are listed on the National Register of Historic Places. Consisting of a new addition and renovated surviving wing of the 1906 building, Union Station was officially dedicated on December 11, 1997. It is a center of several modes of passenger transportation, including Amtrak train service on the Norfolk Southern rail corridor, Greyhound, and other providers of bus services.

Meeting rooms on the mezzanine level are designed for community activities, the existing east wing houses Meridian's economic development agency. Located beside the station, a former Railway Express Agency building has been renovated and adapted as the Meridian Railroad Museum, inviting patrons to learn more about Meridian's railroading history.

== History ==
=== Original depot ===
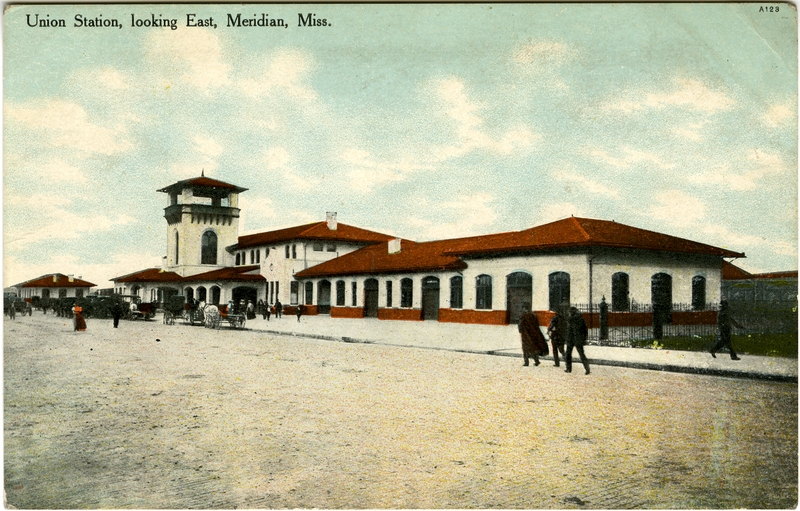
Postcard of original Union Station

The railroading history of Meridian began in the 1850s with the Mobile & Ohio and the Alabama and Vicksburg lines forming a junction at the small community. Meridian would grow to become the largest city in Mississippi at the turn of the 20th century, with five major rail lines; it had 44 trains coming in and out of Meridian daily.

The Meridian Terminal Company, composed of officers from the Mobile & Ohio, the Southern, the Alabama & Vicksburg, and the New Orleans and Northeastern Railroad lines, was formed to build a new passenger depot. The station also hosted trains of the Illinois Central Railroad. The new depot and railway express agency were completed in August 1906 at a cost of $250,000 and constructed in Mission Revival Style architecture. The original depot construction included a central tower, which was demolished in the late 1940s. Further demolition to Union Station occurred in 1966, when all but the eastern wing of the remaining passenger depot was removed.

=== Plans for a new depot ===
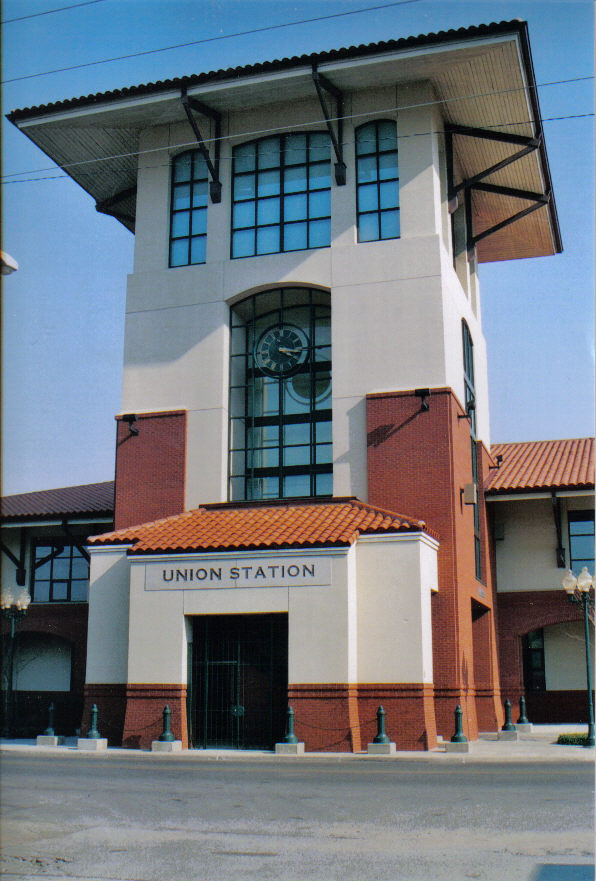
Union Station's central tower

In 1991, a Multi-Modal Transit Study Committee was established to investigate the potential of a MMTC facility. In June of the same year, the Mississippi Department of Transportation approved the use of Federal Transit Administration planning funds for a feasibility study to evaluate the demand and possible sites for a MMTC in Meridian.

The Study Committee, made up of community leaders and organizations, property owners, government officials and interested citizens, participated in the initial charrettes conducted by the engineering firm preparing the feasibility study. It was the collective vision of the committee to develop a model which would not only serve the transportation needs of the East Mississippi/West Alabama area, but which could also serve as a national model for small city inter-modal operations.

=== Funding ===
The Intermodal Surface Transportation Efficiency Act of 1991 (ISTEA) provides funding for transportation capital improvement projects which promote multi-modal facilities and for the preservation of historic transportation structures. The city was awarded $5.1 million in federal and state grants, including the first ISTEA grant ever awarded by the state for a historic reconstruction project. All of this money was funneled directly into construction costs.

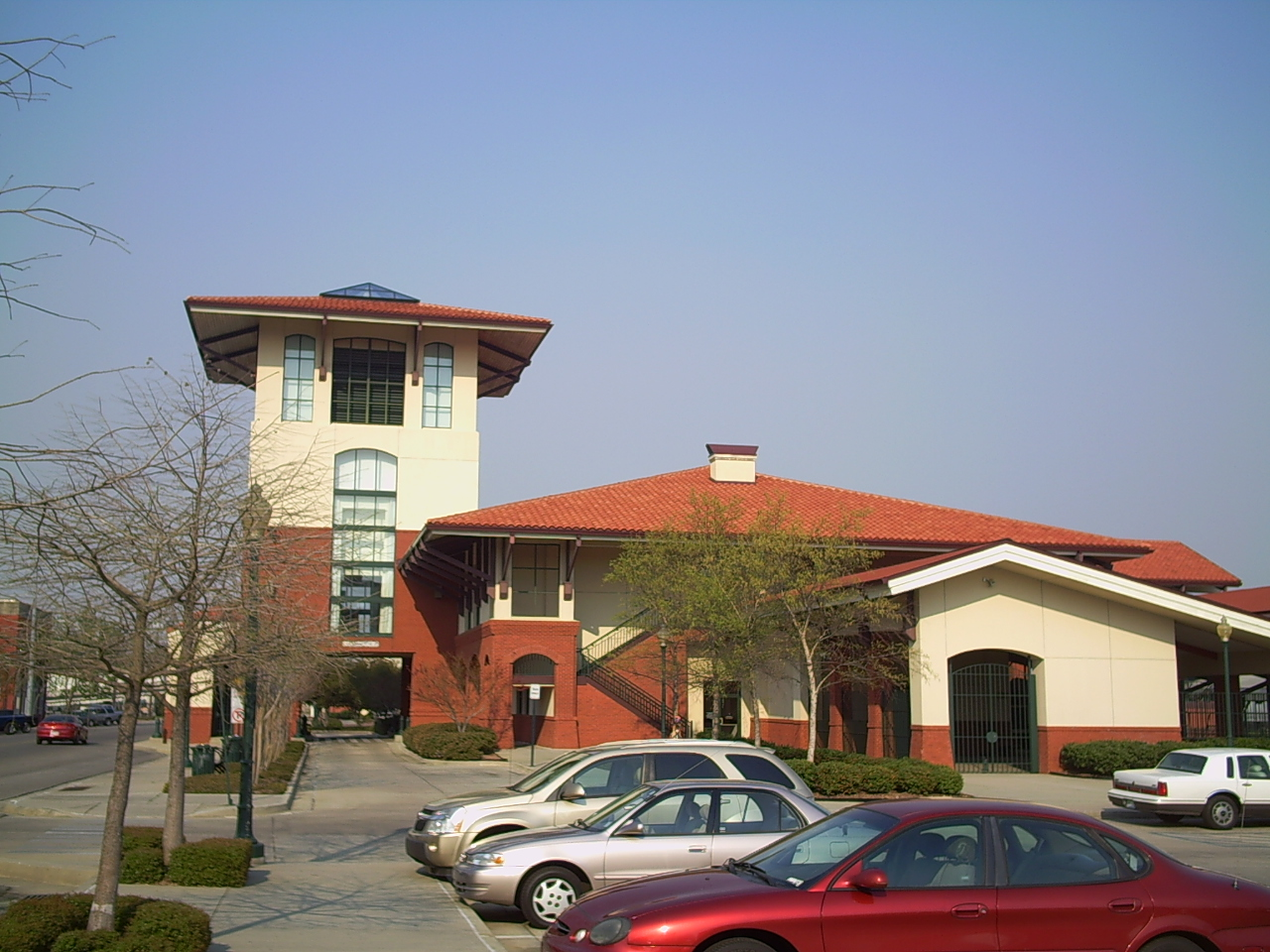
Union Station as seen from Front Street

Local financial aid was provided through Certificates of Participation (COPs), a state-authorized funding mechanism that allows the city to lease the facility from a non-profit corporation that, in turn, sells shares of the lease to financial institutions.

In 1993, Transportation Enhancement funds for the preservation of historic transportation structures under the Surface Transportation Program of ISTEA were approved by the Mississippi Department of Transportation for this project at the request of the City of Meridian. The project involved several constituents in an undertaking that had a total construction price tag of approximately $6.5 million, including $5.1 million in federal and state contributions, $1.3 million from the city, and $431,000 in contributions from Amtrak.

=== Design and development ===
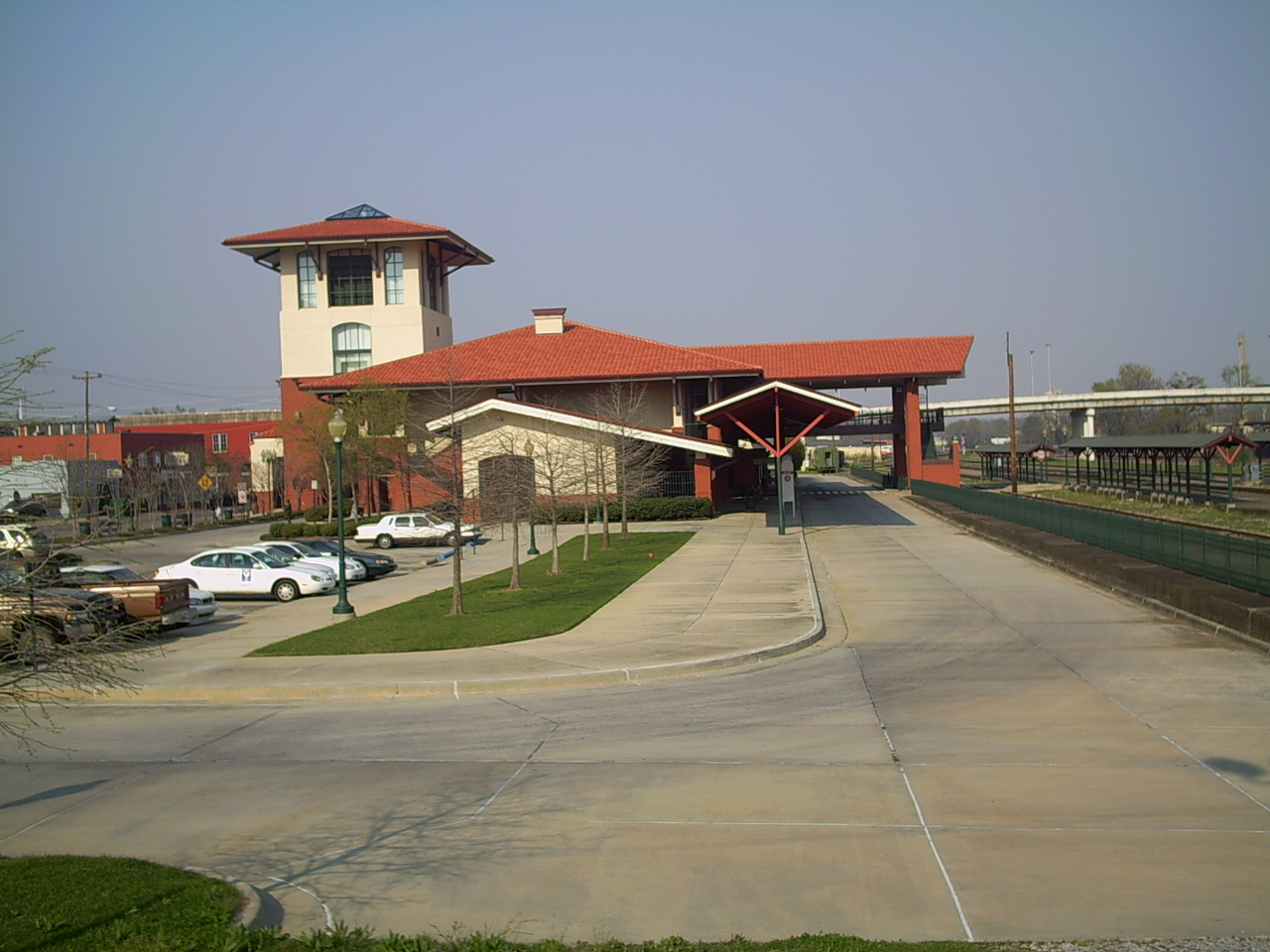
Looking at the Bus Terminal

To begin the process, a design team of joint venture architects, consultant specialists, and engineering consultants commissioned by the city held a series of town meetings as a means of discussing conceptual design concerns with the Study Committee. Conceptual drawings were developed to relate the character of the project and to outline the major components of the MMTC.

The MMTC occupies four city blocks. The Alabama Great Southern Railroad, a subsidiary of Norfolk Southern, donated 6 acres (24,000 m^{2}) of the project site. From east to west, the facilities involved in the Union Station site plan are as follows:

1. An area designed for future addition of rolling stock
2. The Meridian Railroad Museum (REA building)
3. A landscaped area with memorial brick pavers
4. The new terminal addition attached to the surviving portion of the depot.

East of the project site lies a farmers' market, a landscaped park, and an area for festivals and other city events.

== Union Station today ==
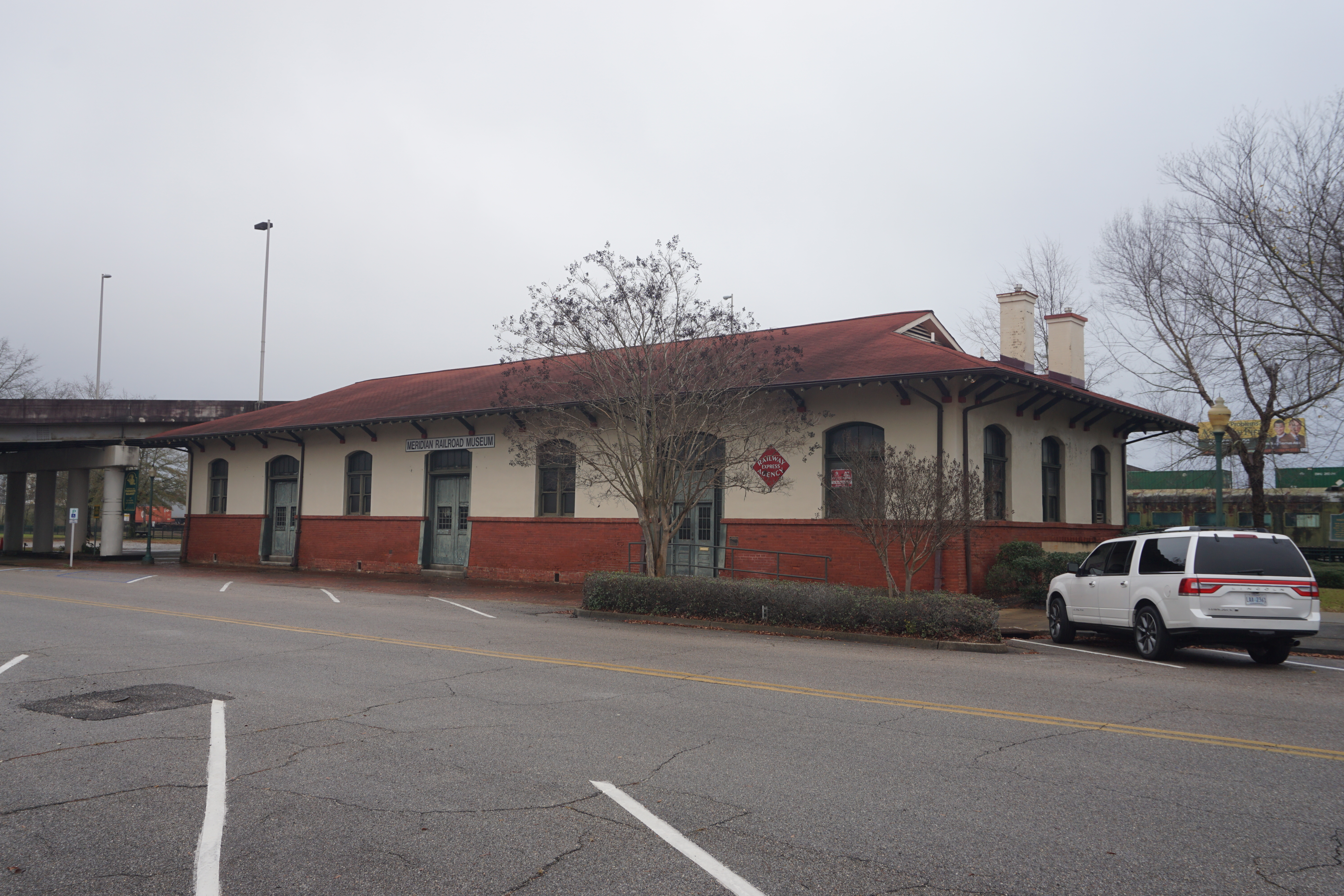
Meridian Railroad Museum at Union Station

Union Station has had a profound impact on the community in numerous ways. The number of passengers on Amtrak trains, Greyhound buses, and Meridian Transit System buses averages 242,360 per year.

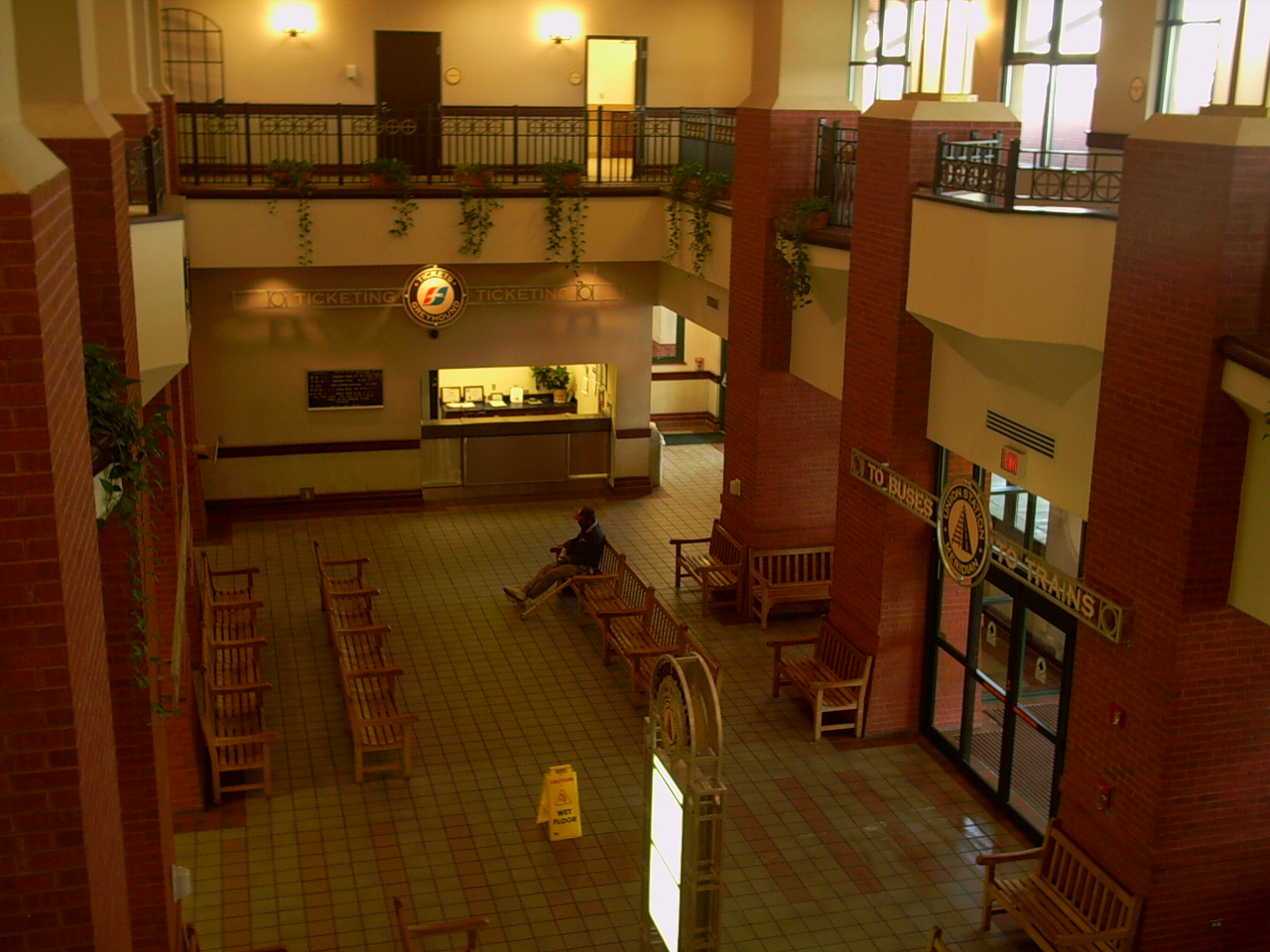
Inside Union Station

The station has already encouraged more than $8 million in private investment in the Depot District, including office space, retail shops, a data processing/computer training center, upper-story apartments on the west side of Front Street, two hotels - the Terminal Hotel and the Union Hotel, the newly renovated Rosenbaum condominiums, two restaurants, and vital records storage buildings. Meridian's iconic Threefoot Building has been fully renovated into an upscale hotel as well.

The meeting rooms on the tower's mezzanine level are in great demand for business meetings and social events such as retirement parties, class reunions, birthday parties, weddings, and receptions. Residents, as well as people with ties to Meridian, are becoming a permanent part of the Union Station complex by purchasing brick pavers inscribed with the names of loved ones, friends or themselves. The pavers are installed in the brick pathway of a small, landscaped green space linking the tower and east wing to the railroad museum.

In April 2023, Community Development Director Craig Hitt said that Amtrak plans a $13-million upgrade to the station. In order to not interrupt service to the station, the work will be done in stages and will not be completed until 2025.
