= BellSouth Long Distance =

BellSouth Long Distance, Inc.
- Company type: Holding of AT&T
- Industry: Telecommunications
- Founded: 1996
- Products: Long distance
- Brands: AT&T Long Distance Service
- Website: www.bellsouth.com/longdistance

BellSouth Long Distance, Inc. consists of the long distance operations of AT&T serving BellSouth Telecommunications customers. BSLD was acquired by AT&T in 2006 when it purchased BellSouth Corporation.

BSLD does business as AT&T Long Distance Service.
