= Quitman station =

- Quitman Depot (Mississippi)
- U.S. National Register of Historic Places
- Mississippi Landmark
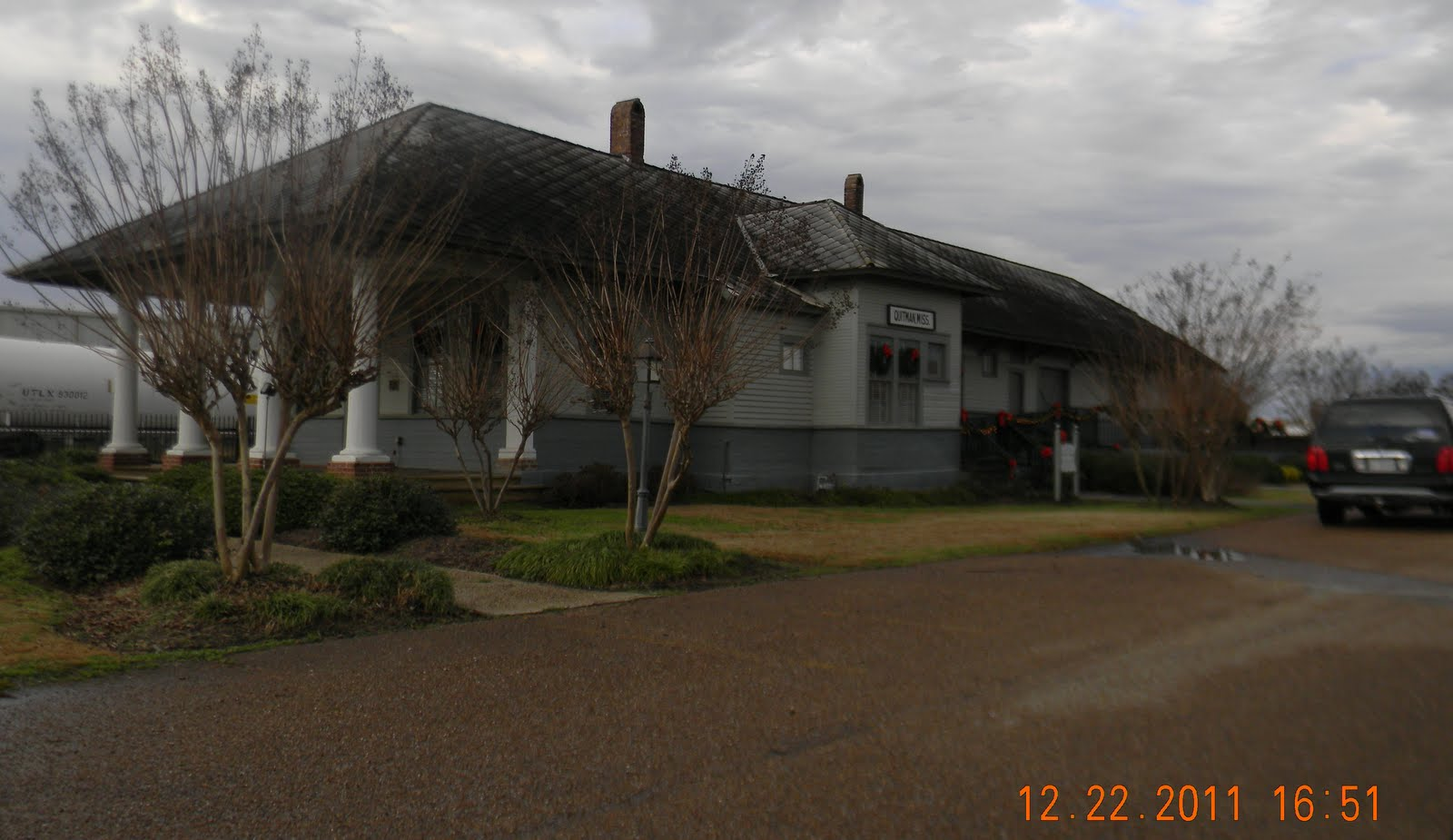
- Quitman Depot in 2011

- Location within Mississippi Location within the United States
- Location: 100 South Railroad Avenue; Quitman, Mississippi
- Coordinates: 32°2′23″N 88°43′49″W
- Area: less than 1 acre (0.40 ha)
- Built: c. 1910
- Architectural style: Vernacular
- MPS
- NRHP reference No.: 94000505
- USMS No.: 023-QTM-0192-NR-NRD-ML

Significant dates
- Added to NRHP: May 20, 1994
- Designated USMS: January 10, 1996

Quitman Depot, also known as GM&O Railroad Depot, is a historic railway station located at 100 South Railroad Avenue in Quitman, Mississippi. The depot was placed on the National Register of Historic Places in 1994 and was designated a Mississippi Landmark in 1996.

== Description ==
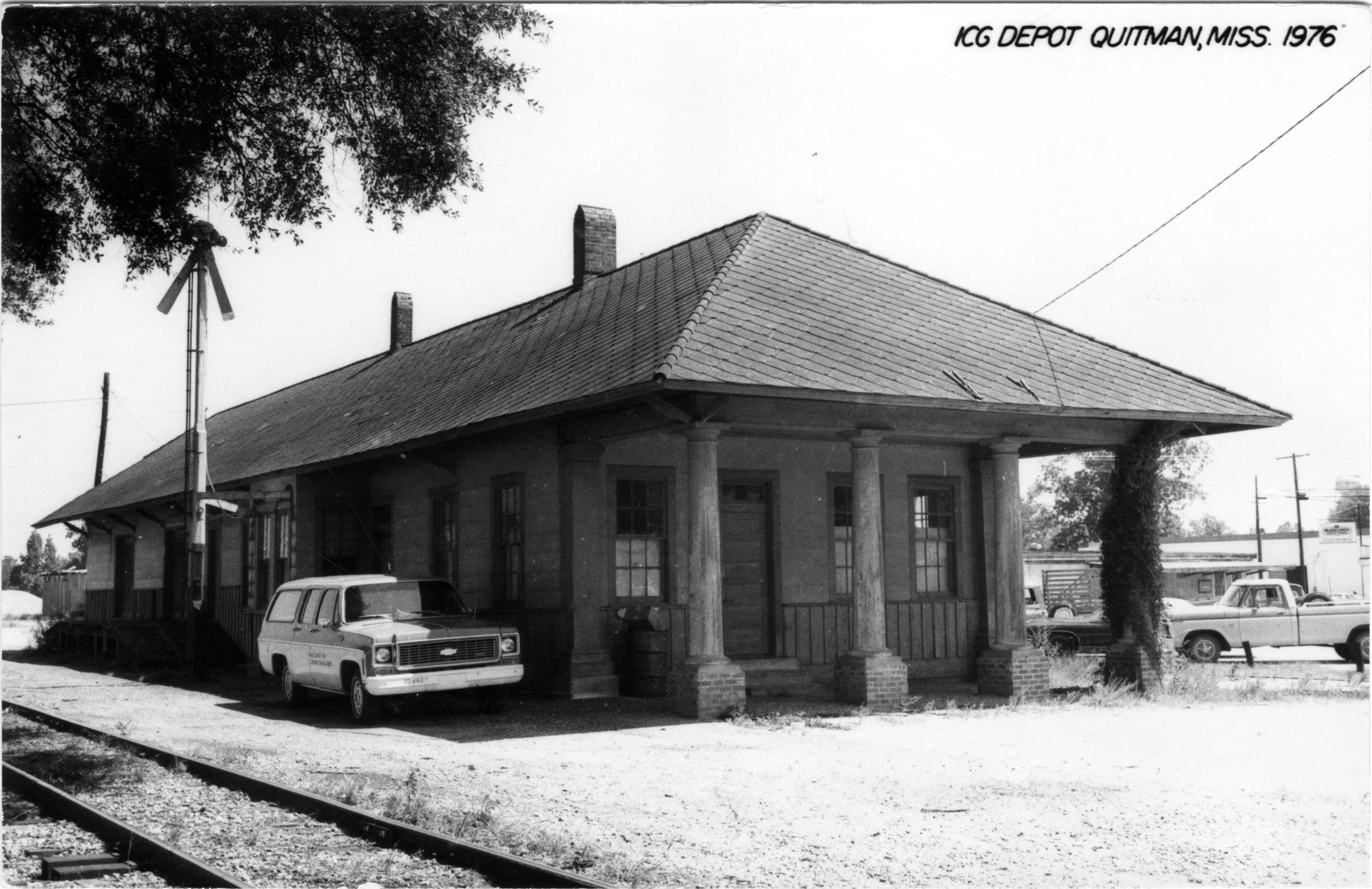
Quitman depot in 1976

The Quitman Depot is a one-story, rectangular, wood frame structure, built around 1910. Typical of railway stations in small towns, the depot floor plan included areas for freight, a passenger waiting room, and an office for the railroad agent. The hip roof featured wide, overhanging eaves to shelter passengers and workers on the loading dock. The lower portion of outer walls was covered with board and batten wainscoting, and asbestos shingles covered the upper portion. The south elevation was dominated by a carriage porch, with an entrance door and three, double-hung sash windows on the south wall. The west elevation, facing the railroad, contained an agent's bay, entrance door, double hung sash windows, two freight doors, and loading dock. The loading dock extended across the north elevation and along the east elevation for access to two additional freight doors, then ended at a projecting bay, about mid-length on the east side. The depot's interior featured beaded-board walls and ceilings.

== Restoration ==
By 1970, railroad operation at the depot had ceased. By 1990, the structure had become dilapidated from neglect. Historic Clarke County, Inc. acquired the depot and completed restoration in 1999, using private donations as matching funds to secure a grant from the Mississippi Department of Transportation.

The Quitman Depot houses the Clarke County Chamber of Commerce.

Preceding station	Gulf, Mobile and Ohio Railroad	Following station
Meridian toward Dyersburg	Dyersburg - Mobile	Shubuta toward Mobile
