= Owen Building =

Owen Building may refer to:

- Owen Building (Columbia, South Carolina)
- Owen Building (Sheffield Hallam University)
