= Lorena Weeks =

American sex discrimination case plaintiff

Lorena W. Weeks (born 1929) was the plaintiff in an important sex discrimination case, Weeks v. Southern Bell (1969). She claimed that Southern Bell had violated her rights under the 1964 Civil Rights Act when they denied her application for promotion to a higher paying position because she was a woman. She was represented in the case by Sylvia Roberts, a National Organization for Women attorney. She lost the initial case but won in 1969 after several appeals.

== Early life ==
Lorena Weeks was born in 1929 in Columbia, South Carolina. Her family moved around before settling in Louisville, Georgia when she was nine years old. Around the same time, her father died in a sawmill accident, leaving her mother to raise and provide for Lorena and her three siblings. In 1947, when Lorena was 18, her mother died of a cerebral hemorrhage. Lorena was left to care for her younger siblings. In order to support them, she worked a four-hour shift as a waitress before working an overnight shift as a telephone operator for Southern Bell. She married Billy Weeks, an electrician who happened to have the same last name. She took a five-year break from working at Southern Bell when she had three children in rapid succession. Lorena and Billy wanted their children to be able to send their children to college so Lorena went back to work "as soon as my girl was old enough to call me on the phone to talk."

== Weeks v. Southern Bell ==
While Lorena was working at Southern Bell, she saw a notice that a higher paying switchman's job was open. She applied for the post, which involved making sure routing equipment was working. She was denied on the basis that the job was only given to men. She sent a letter to the Equal Employment Opportunity Commission which investigated but Southern Bell said their decision was made, citing a Georgia rule women could not be made to lift anything heavier than 30 pounds. In her current position as a clerk, she had to lift a 34-pound typewriter each day. She filed a legal appeal which she lost in district court. She was represented by a union lawyer in court. After returning to work, she began to write out her reports by hand instead of lifting her typewriter onto the desk. Her supervisor complained and suspended her from work. She then met with Marguerite Rawalt who told her that the National Organization for Women would represent her for free. Sylvia Roberts was assigned to her appeal which was heard before Judge Griffin Bell of the Fifth Circuit Court of Appeals. She eventually won her case after years of appeals. The primary argument used was that "women come in all shapes and sizes." The idea that no woman could lift thirty pounds was ridiculous given the number of women who routinely carried thirty pound children. In the end, Lorena Weeks received a check for $31,000 in back pay and the switchman's job.

== Legacy ==
Weeks v. Southern Bell was an important case as it marked the first victory in which NOW used the Civil Rights Act to fight gender-based discrimination. It helped to open the way for women to earn a good living without depending on a husband for support. Without such a ruling, legislation such as the Lilly Ledbetter Fair Pay Act would not have been possible.

Lorena Weeks' files related to Weeks v. Southern Bell are held at the Richard B. Russell Library for Political Research and Studies, University of Georgia Libraries, Athens, Georgia, 30602-1641. Lorena Weeks donated her papers to them in 2010.
