= BellSouth =

Defunct American telecommunications company

BellSouth, LLC

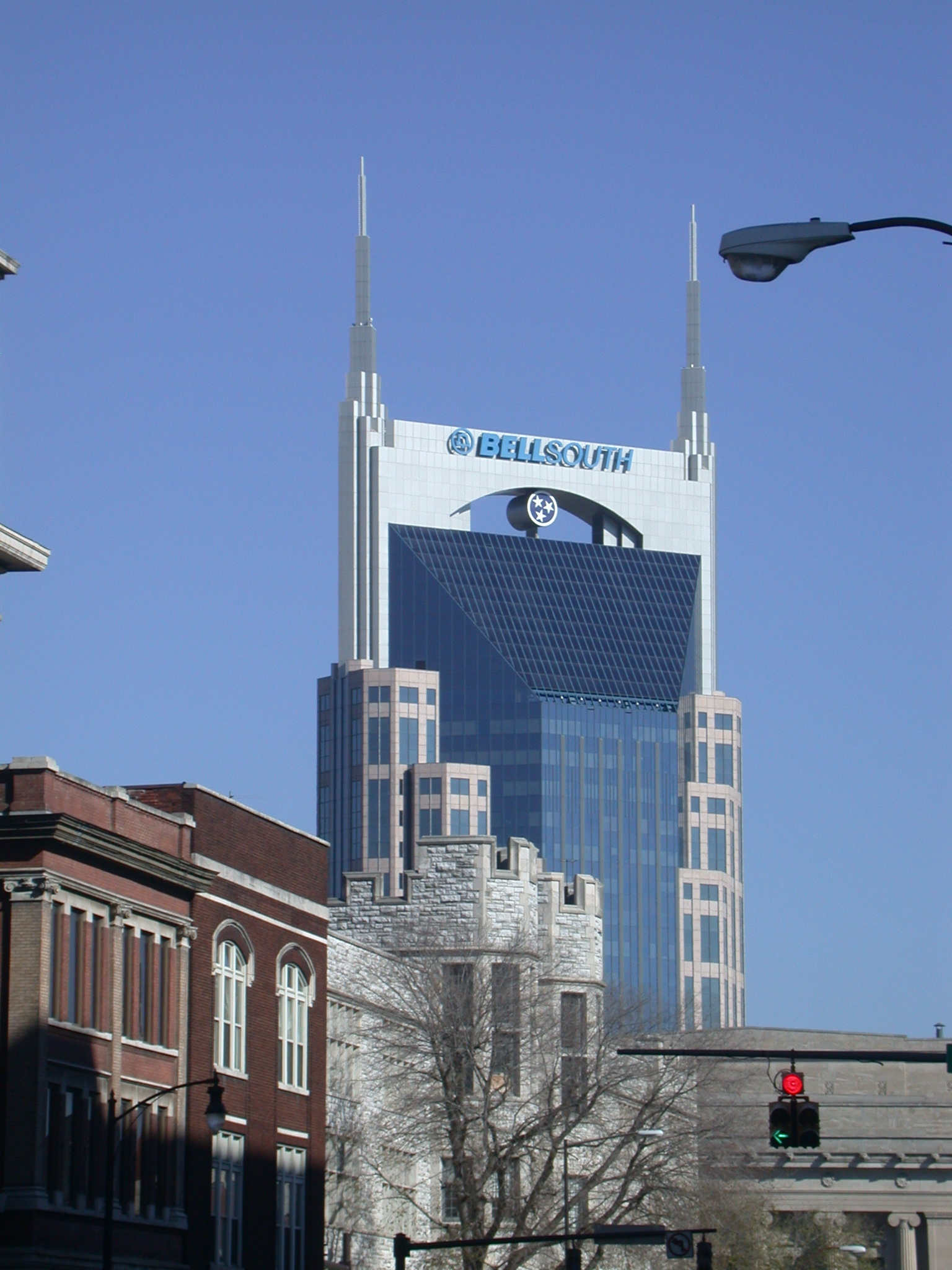
- BellSouth Regional Headquarters in Nashville (circa 2003)
- Trade name: AT&T South
- Type: Subsidiary
- Traded as: NYSE: BLS
- Industry: Telecommunications
- Founded: December 31, 1983; 42 years ago
- Defunct: December 29, 2006; 19 years ago
- Fate: Acquired by AT&T Inc.
- Headquarters: Atlanta, Georgia, U.S.
- Key people: F. Duane Ackerman (chairman and CEO)
- Products: Telephone, Internet, Television
- Number of employees: 63,000
- Parent: AT&T Corporation (1983); AT&T Inc. (2006)
- Subsidiaries: BellSouth Telecommunications
- Website: bellsouth.com at the Wayback Machine (archived 2000-07-06)

BellSouth, LLC (stylized as BELLSOUTH and formerly known as BellSouth Corporation) was an American telecommunications holding company based in Atlanta, Georgia. BellSouth was one of the seven original Regional Bell Operating Companies after the U.S. Department of Justice forced the American Telephone & Telegraph Company to divest itself of its regional telephone companies on January 1, 1984.

In a merger announced on March 5, 2006, and executed on December 29, 2006, AT&T Inc. (originally SBC Communications) acquired BellSouth for approximately $86 billion (1.325 shares of AT&T for each share of BellSouth). The merger also consolidated ownership of Cingular Wireless and Yellowpages.com, both of which were joint ventures between BellSouth and AT&T. With the merger completed, wireless services previously offered by Cingular Wireless were then offered under the AT&T name, and BellSouth Telecommunications (a subsidiary of a Bell Operating Company) began doing business as AT&T Southeast.

BellSouth was the last of the Regional Bell Operating Companies to keep its original corporate name after the 1984 AT&T breakup, as well as the last one to retain the Bell logo as part of its main corporate identity.

BellSouth also operated in Latin America in Argentina, Chile, Colombia, Ecuador, Guatemala, Nicaragua, Panama, Peru, Uruguay and Venezuela. BellSouth operated in New Zealand under the name of BellSouth New Zealand Limited from 1993 until 1998 when it was acquired by Vodafone to become Vodafone New Zealand. It competed against Telecom New Zealand. Its operations in Australia were under the name of BellSouth Australia Pty Limited. All of BellSouth's operations in Latin America were acquired by Telefonica in late 2004 for nearly $5.85 billion, and became Movistar.

== Organization and services ==
As part of the breakup of the old AT&T during 1984, BellSouth was formed as the holding company for the telephone operating companies in the southern portion of the old Bell System—Atlanta-based Southern Bell and Birmingham, Alabama-based South Central Bell. The creation of BellSouth, in effect, reunited most telephone service in the Southeastern United States. Southern Bell had been the Bell System operating company for the entire Southeast until 1967, when the western portion of its service territory became South Central Bell.

BellSouth formed a shared services company, BellSouth Services, to provide centralized functions such as engineering and information technology to Southern Bell and South Central Bell. Services provided in the BellSouth operating area include telephone and DSL/Dial-up Internet services in the states of Alabama, Florida, Georgia, Kentucky, Louisiana, Mississippi, North Carolina, South Carolina, and Tennessee. Satellite television service was provided as a partnership with DirecTV. Cable television (often via MMDS) was provided in limited markets as BellSouth Entertainment (as part of the Americast venture).

In 1992, BellSouth merged South Central Bell and BellSouth Services into Southern Bell, which changed its name to BellSouth Telecommunications. This created a single operating company in the BellSouth territory, and fully reunited Southern Bell and South Central Bell. However, BellSouth continued using the Southern Bell name in the eastern portion of its territory and the South Central Bell name in the western portion until 1998, when it adopted BellSouth as the sole customer-facing brand.

The company maintained its largest operation centers in Atlanta and Birmingham. Region-wide headquarters operations were also primarily in Atlanta and Birmingham. Statewide operations centers were located in Birmingham, Miami, Atlanta, Louisville, New Orleans, Jackson, Charlotte, Columbia, and Nashville. BellSouth Mobility was based in Atlanta, Georgia and Birmingham, Alabama.

In August 1998, BellSouth launched FastAccess DSL, their broadband service provided through a DSL connection, initially launched in the Atlanta, Birmingham, Charlotte, Miami/Ft. Lauderdale, Jacksonville, New Orleans and Raleigh/Durham areas. Eventually, it became available in all of BellSouth's service area.

Toward its end, BellSouth realigned itself in two important areas, Wireless and broadband. In 2001, they merged BellSouth Mobility, their wireless enterprise, with SBC's wireless services, and took a 40% stake in the resulting company, Cingular Wireless. The new company provided a large percentage of BellSouth's revenue. This joint venture continued after SBC purchased the old AT&T and rebranded as AT&T Inc. Continued increase of broadband penetration and applications in the consumer market was a key strategy to the company. These activities were being funded in part by the sale of Latin America operations.

BellSouth became the first "Baby Bell" that did not operate pay telephones. By 2003, BellSouth's payphone operation was discontinued because it had become too unprofitable, most likely due to the increased availability of cell phones. Cincinnati Bell has taken BellSouth's place for payphones in northern BellSouth territory; independents have set in further south.

BellSouth's main operating units at its end were the Communications Group, Domestic Wireless, and Advertising and Publishing. The communications group operated two wholly owned subsidiaries, BellSouth Telecommunications Inc. (BST) and BellSouth Long Distance, Inc. (BSLD). The main marketing groups for the communications group were consumer, small business, large business, and interconnection (wholesale services). The communications group provided wireline communications services, including local exchange, network access, intraLATA long-distance services, and Internet services, as well as long-distance services.

The advertising and publishing group was responsible for printing and distributing telephone books, selling advertising, and operating online electronic directories.

The BellSouth–SBC/AT&T relationship went further than just Cingular Wireless. Both companies also co-owned yellowpages.com (formerly RealPages.com and SmartPages.com).

BellSouth licensed its trademark to US Electronics, which produced telephones under the BellSouth brand. It also previously maintained a history page at bellsouth.com/servicemarks, which displayed its former and recent BellSouth logo usage.

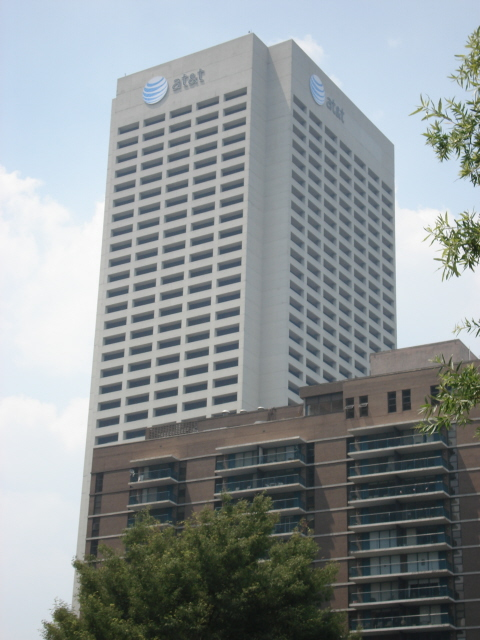
AT&T Midtown Center, Atlanta, AT&T Southeast headquarters.

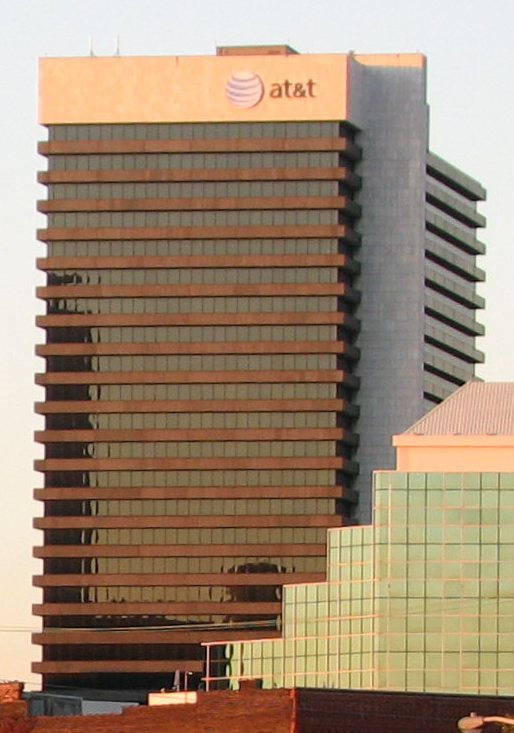
AT&T City Center, Birmingham, Alabama, South Central Bell's former Headquarters.

=== BellSouth stops displaying caller ID from Sprint customers ===
BellSouth customers were no longer receiving caller ID information from Sprint PCS customers based on an Atlanta Business Chronicle article from December 15, 2003. Any incoming call originating from a Sprint PCS cell phone will usually display the City, State format on the caller ID display instead of the name or business name associated with that number. Based on a 1996 agreement between Sprint and BellSouth, it is likely that this is a result of a ten-year contract. In 2003, Sprint sued BellSouth for $20 million as a result of Sprint claiming Bellsouth violated a 1996 contract by not providing Sprint caller-identification information to BellSouth customers.

Similar caller ID "deals" have been left to the consumer to fight either with their own carrier or through government regulatory commissions for what they should have displayed on their caller ID device. In 2002, Sprint and SBC Communications could not come to an agreement on fees charged to carriers to look up the caller name information.

== Alleged NSA cooperation ==
In 2006, USA Today published an article which erroneously claimed that three of the largest United States carriers, including BellSouth, had been supplying calling records to the National Security Agency for all international and domestic calls. This data, the article claimed, is being used to create, "the largest database ever assembled."

On May 16, 2006, BellSouth released a retraction claiming that no contract with the NSA existed and that they had never provided information such as calling records to the NSA.

USA Today posted an update on June 30, 2006, stating that:

"On May 15, BellSouth said it could not categorically deny participation in the program until it had conducted a detailed investigation. BellSouth said that internal review concluded that the company did not contract with the NSA or turn over calling records."

== See also ==
- BellSouth Telecommunications
- Cingular Wireless
