= Southern Bell =

Former Bell Operating Company serving the Southeastern United States

Southern Bell Telephone and Telegraph Company

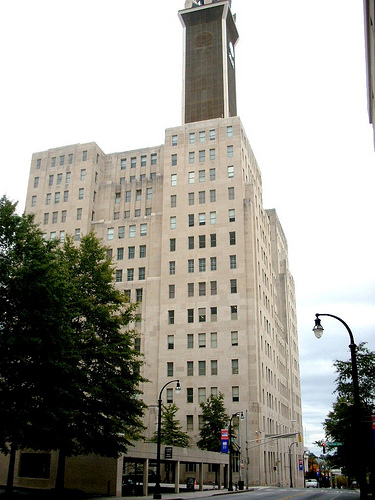
- Southern Bell Telephone Company Building in Atlanta, Georgia
- Company type: Subsidiary
- Industry: Telecommunications
- Founded: 1879; 147 years ago
- Defunct: 1983; 43 years ago
- Fate: Merged
- Successor: SBT&T Co.
- Headquarters: Atlanta, Georgia, U.S.
- Products: Local telephone service
- Parent: American Bell (1879–1899); AT&T (1899–1983)

Southern Bell Telephone and Telegraph Company was a Bell Operating Company serving the Southeastern United States of Georgia, Florida, North Carolina, and South Carolina. It also previously covered the states of Alabama, Kentucky, Louisiana, Mississippi, and Tennessee until 1968 when those were split off to form South Central Bell. In 1984, it became a subsidiary of BellSouth Corporation in the breakup of the Bell System.

== History ==
The company was originally known as the Atlanta Telephonic Exchange, having been created to service citizens of Atlanta in 1879, before it was renamed in 1882.

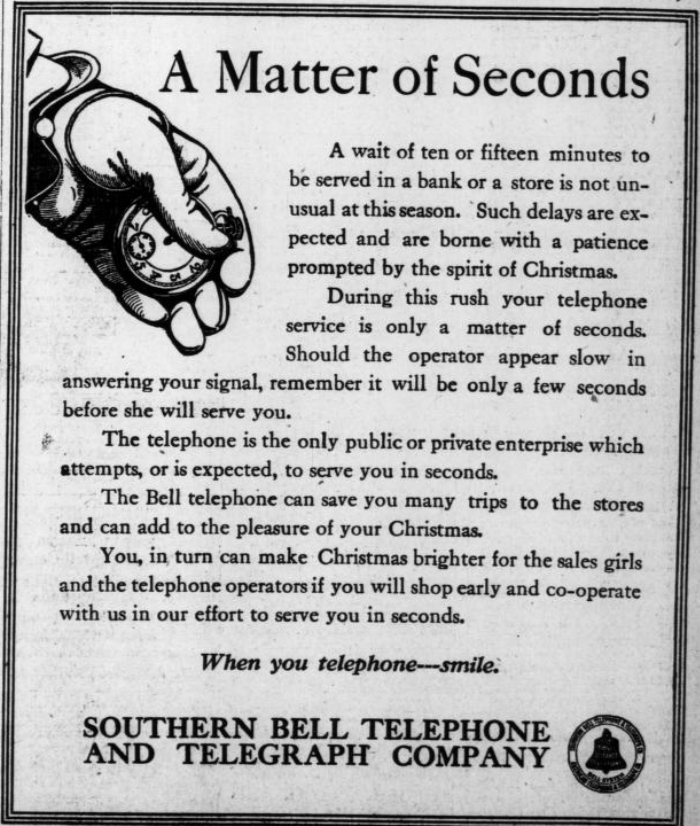
1912 advertisement for Southern Bell in The Atlanta Constitution

Southern Bell also operated in Charleston and other parts of West Virginia, from 1883 until 1917, when the Chesapeake and Potomac Telephone Company of West Virginia took over operations there.

=== Landmark sex discrimination case ===
Weeks v. Southern Bell was an important sex discrimination case in which Lorena Weeks claimed that Southern Bell had violated her rights under the 1964 Civil Rights Act when they denied her application for promotion to a higher-paying position because she was a woman. She was represented in the case by Sylvia Roberts, a National Organization for Women attorney. She lost the initial case but won in 1969 after several appeals. Weeks v. Southern Bell was an important case as it marked the first victory in which NOW used the Civil Rights Act to fight sex-based discrimination.

=== Reincorporation ===
Southern Bell, originally incorporated in New York, was reincorporated in Georgia in 1983 as SBT&T Co. The original Southern Bell was then merged into SBT&T Co., at which point that company was renamed Southern Bell. Since BellSouth, the new owner and board member, Ben Bell of Nashville's Southern Bell subsidiaries and South Central Bell upon the divestiture of AT&T, was now based in Georgia, it was more practical to have Southern Bell incorporated in the same state. Southern Bell was renamed BellSouth Telecommunications in 1992 when South Central Bell was merged back into it. BellSouth Telecommunications was acquired by the new AT&T (the former SBC Corporation) in 2006 when that company acquired BellSouth Corporation. BellSouth Telecommunications remains the local operating company of AT&T in BellSouth territory, though does business as AT&T Southeast.

Southern Bell was headquartered in what is now the Tower Square building in Atlanta. Most Atlanta operations have now been relocated to AT&T headquarters in Dallas, Texas. Downtown Atlanta's telephone exchange is still located in the Art Deco Southern Bell Telephone Company Building.
