= F. Duane Ackerman =

American businessman (born 1942)

- Born: 1942 (age 83–84)
- Education: Rollins College; MIT Sloan School of Management
- Occupation: businessman
- Title: BellSouth Corporation (Chairman & CEO)
- Honours: Georgia Trustee

F. Duane Ackerman (born 1942) is an American businessman. He was the last chairman and Chief Executive Officer of BellSouth Corporation.

== Early life ==
Ackerman was raised in Plant City, Florida. In 1964, he graduated from Rollins College with a B.S. in physics. In 1970, he graduated from the Rollins College Crummer Graduate School of Business with an MBA. In 1978, Ackerman also graduated from the MIT Sloan School of Management with a master's degree in management.

== Career ==
Ackerman began his communications career in 1964, and worked in numerous capacities with BellSouth. In November 1992, he was named President and Chief Executive Officer of BellSouth Telecommunications, BellSouth's local telephone service unit and largest subsidiary. He was promoted to vice chairman and Chief Operating Officer in January 1995, and was elevated to the position of President and CEO in January 1997. A year later, the BellSouth board added the chairman's responsibilities to Ackerman's portfolio, and he was chairman and CEO until BellSouth's merger with AT&T on December 29, 2006. In 2006, his total annual compensation was a reported $13.97 million, with a 5-year compensational total of $43.30 million.

Ackerman is on the President's Council of Advisors on Science and Technology and is immediate past chairman of the U.S. Council on Competitiveness, as well as the National Security Telecommunications Advisory Committee. He is a former member of the Homeland Security Advisory Council. A past chair of the Georgia Partnership for Excellence in Education, Ackerman is vice chairman of the Rollins College Board of Trustees and a former member of the Board of Governors for the Society of Sloan Fellows of MIT.

== Awards and honors ==
In 2017, he was inducted as a Georgia Trustee, an honor given by the Georgia Historical Society in conjunction with the Governor of Georgia to individuals whose accomplishments and community service reflect the ideals of the founding body of Trustees, which governed the Georgia colony from 1732 to 1752.
