= P. Thornton Marye =

American architect

Philip Thornton Marye (1872-1935), known as P. Thornton Marye, was an American architect with offices in Atlanta, Georgia.

Marye was born in Alexandria, Virginia, and raised at the family mansion, Brompton, outside Fredericksburg, Virginia. He attended Randolph-Macon College and the University of Virginia before serving in the Fourth Virginia Volunteers in Cuba during the Spanish–American War. Marye trained in architecture briefly with Glen Brown in Washington, D.C., and practiced architecture in Newport News, Virginia, in the early 1900s, but moved to Atlanta in 1903 after receiving the important commission to design the Atlanta Terminal Station. The success of the Atlanta Terminal led to him being selected to design the Terminal Station in Birmingham, Alabama. With partners he designed several notable civic, commercial, and domestic buildings in the Atlanta area, including several which are listed in the National Register of Historic Places. He served in the U.S. Army Construction Division and American Expeditionary Forces Transportation Corps in World War I. Marye also was known for his efforts in architectural preservation, and served as a district officer of the Historic American Buildings Survey and as consultant to the American Institute of Architects Commission for the Preservation of Historic Buildings in America. Several of the buildings Marye designed have been listed in the National Register of Historic Places (NRHP).

P. Thornton Marye's partnerships include:

- with A. Ten Eyck Brown
- the firm of Marye, Alger, and Alger with Barrett Alger and his son Richard Alger
- the firm of Marye, Alger, and Vinour with Olivier Vinour

P. Thornton Marye's works include:

- St. Paul's Episcopal Church, Newport News, Virginia (1899)
- Terminal Station (Atlanta), Atlanta, Georgia (1905)
- St. Luke's Episcopal Church, Atlanta, Georgia (1906)
- Gulf, Mobile and Ohio Passenger Terminal, Mobile, Alabama (1907) NRHP 75000323
- Birmingham Terminal Station, Birmingham, Alabama (1909)
- Highlands Methodist Church, Birmingham, Alabama (1909)
- Capital City Club, Atlanta, Georgia (1911) NRHP 77000425
- Edward Lyle House, 108 17th St Ne, Atlanta, Georgia (1912) Ansley Park
- Truitt Vanderbilt Club, 304 Broad Street, LaGrange, Georgia (1914)
- Gentry-McClinton House, Atlanta, Georgia (1914)
- Greenville County Courthouse, Greenville, South Carolina (1918) NRHP 94000300
- Randolph-Lucas House, Atlanta, Georgia (1924)
- Sunny Gables Alumni House, LaGrange College, LaGrange, Georgia (1925)
- Fox Theatre (Atlanta), Atlanta, Georgia (1929) NRHP 74002230
- Southern Bell Telephone Company Building, Atlanta, Georgia (1929) NRHP 78000985
- Aladdin Theater, also known as The Historic Cocoa Village Playhouse, Cocoa, FL (1924) NRHP 91001541

== Gallery ==
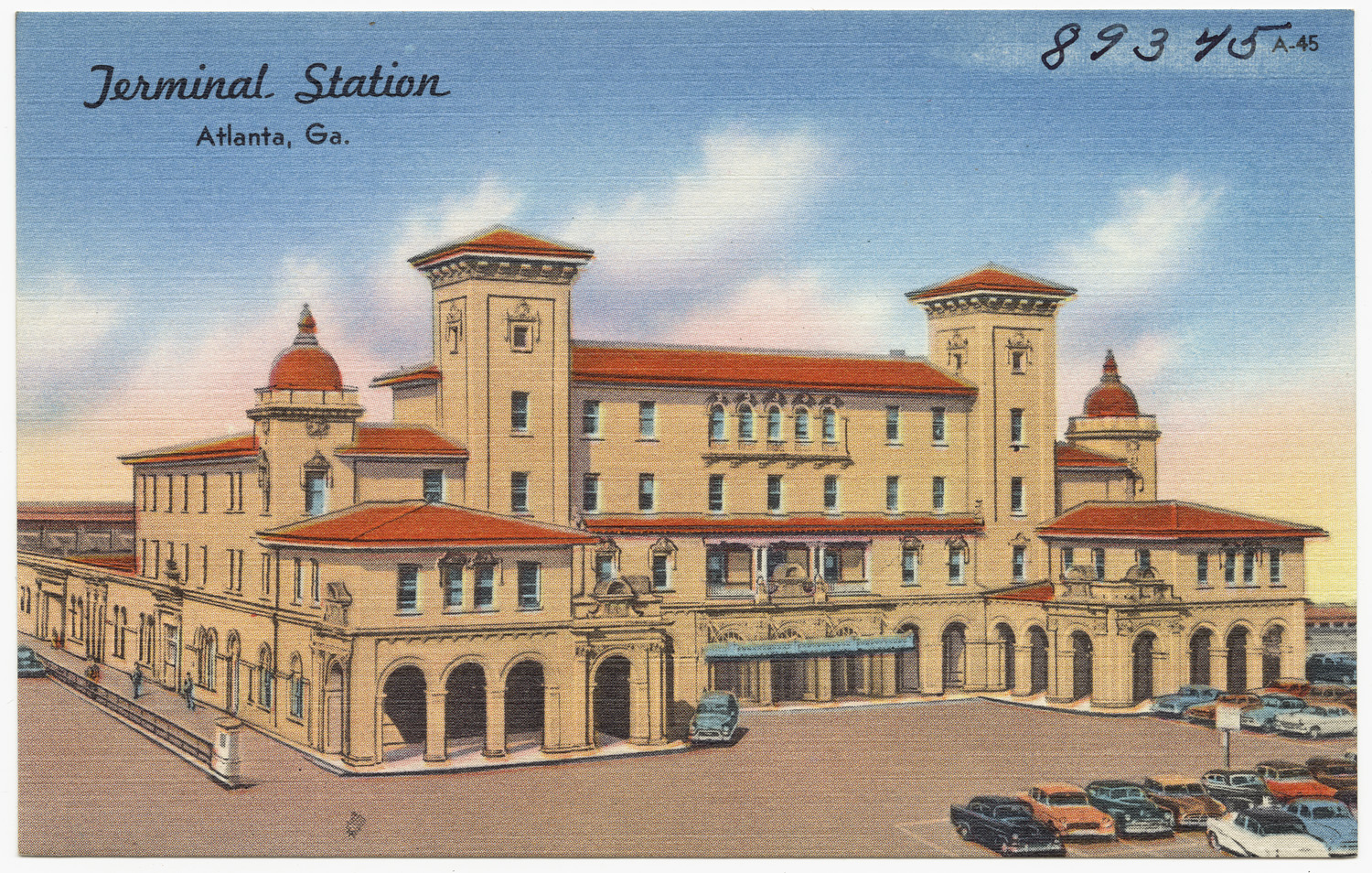
Atlanta Terminal Station

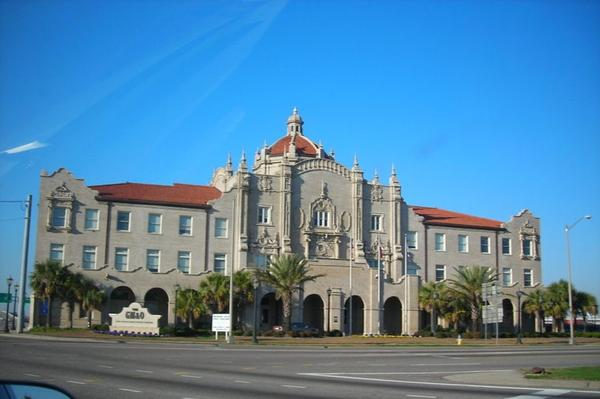
Mobile Terminal

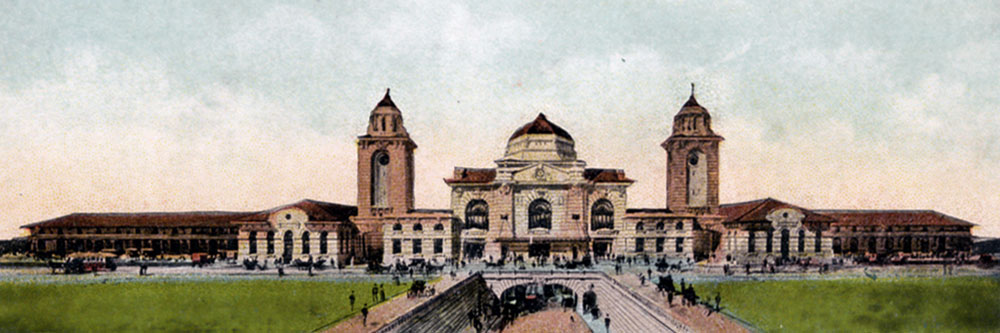
Birmingham Terminal

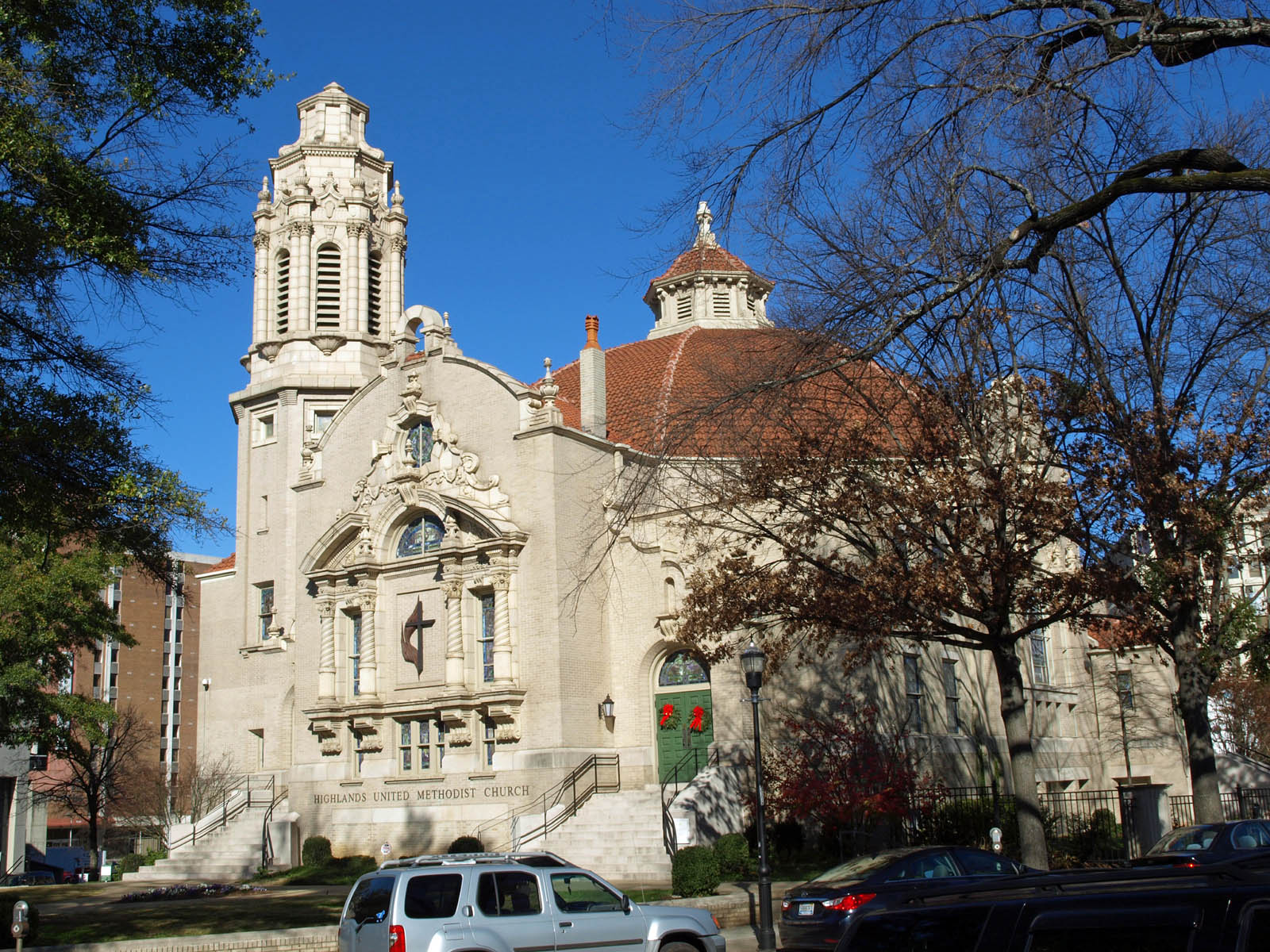
Highlands United Methodist Church

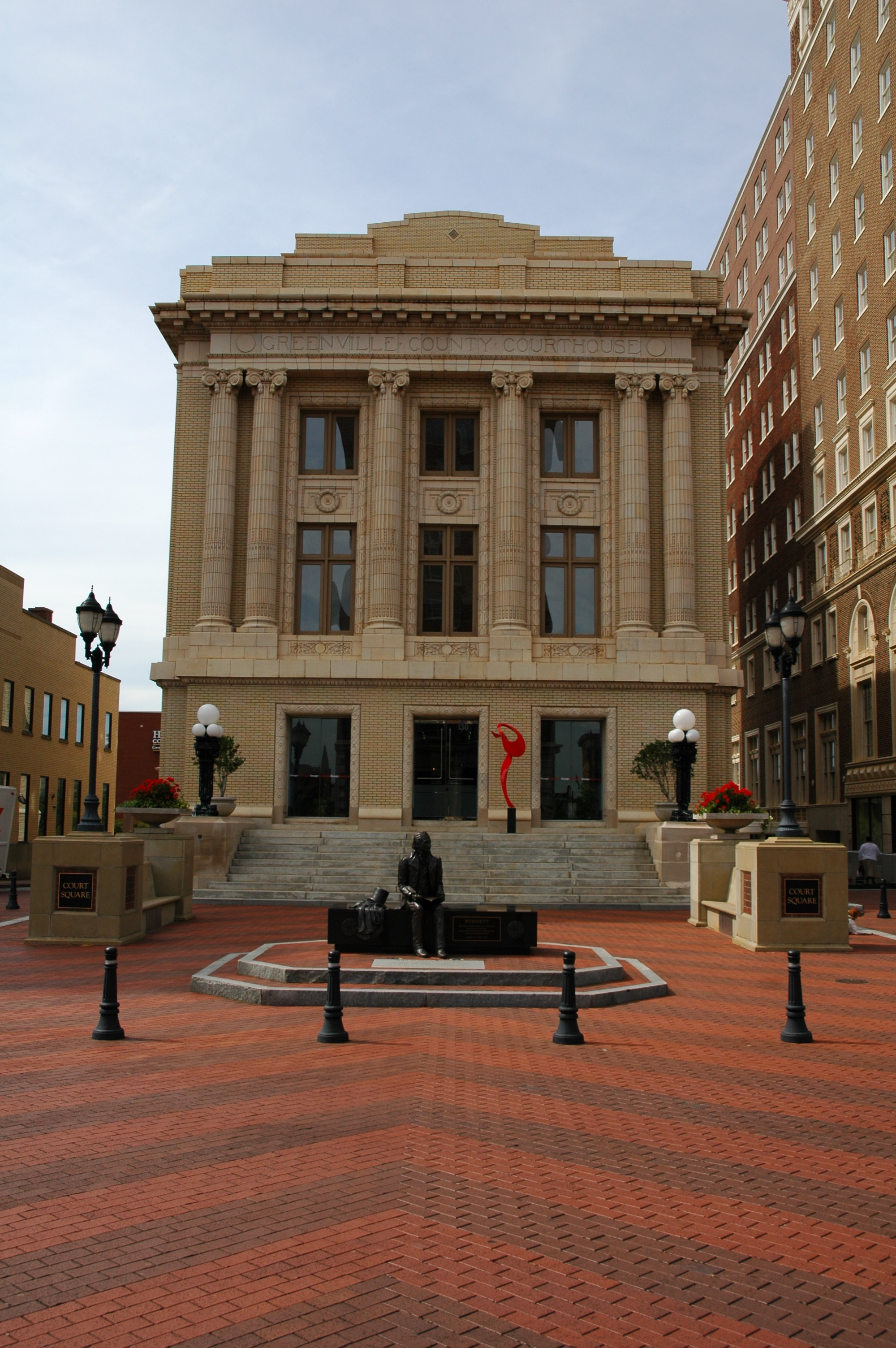
Greenville County Courthouse

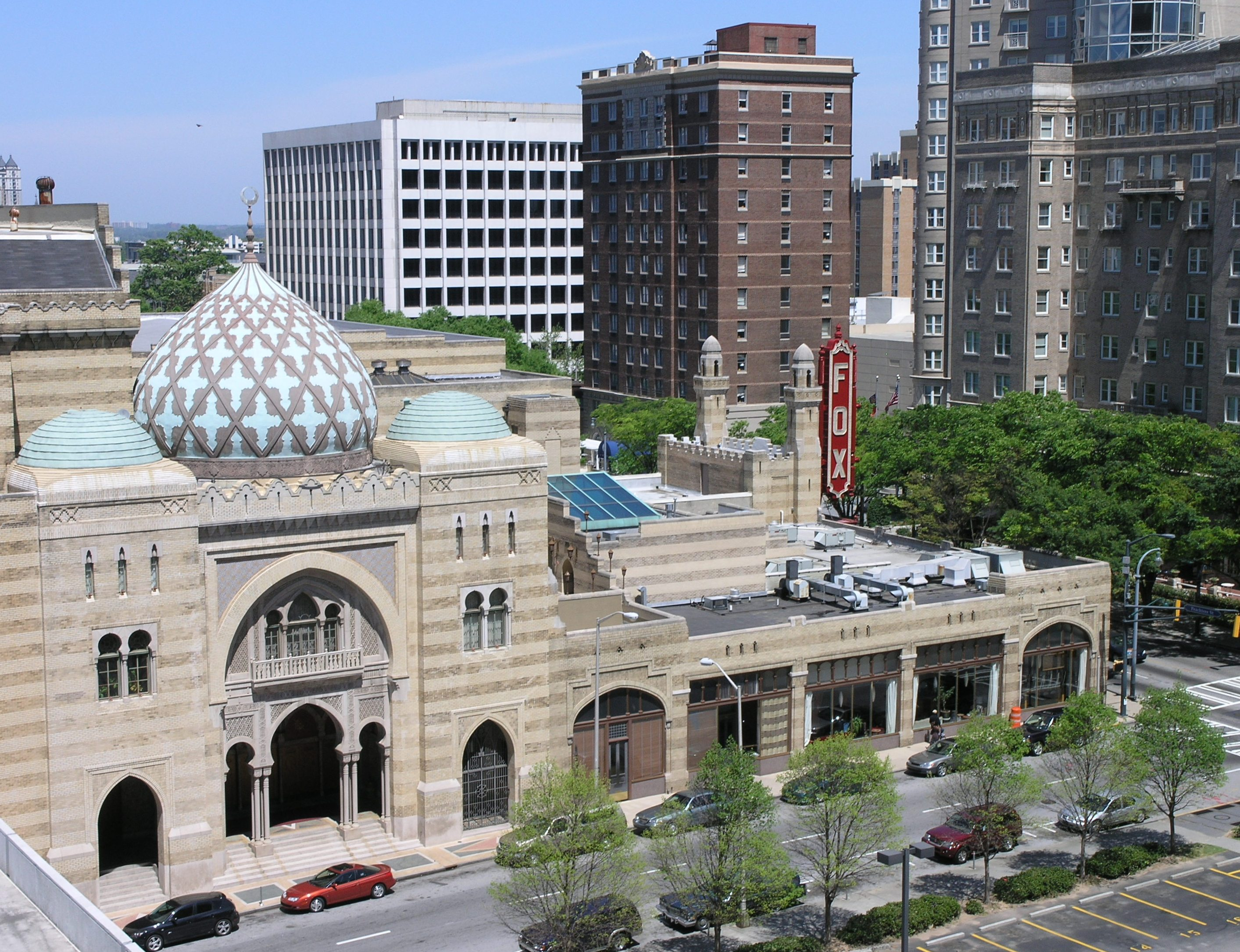
Fox Theater

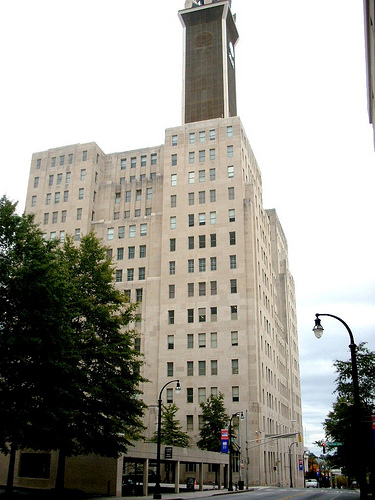
Southern Bell Building

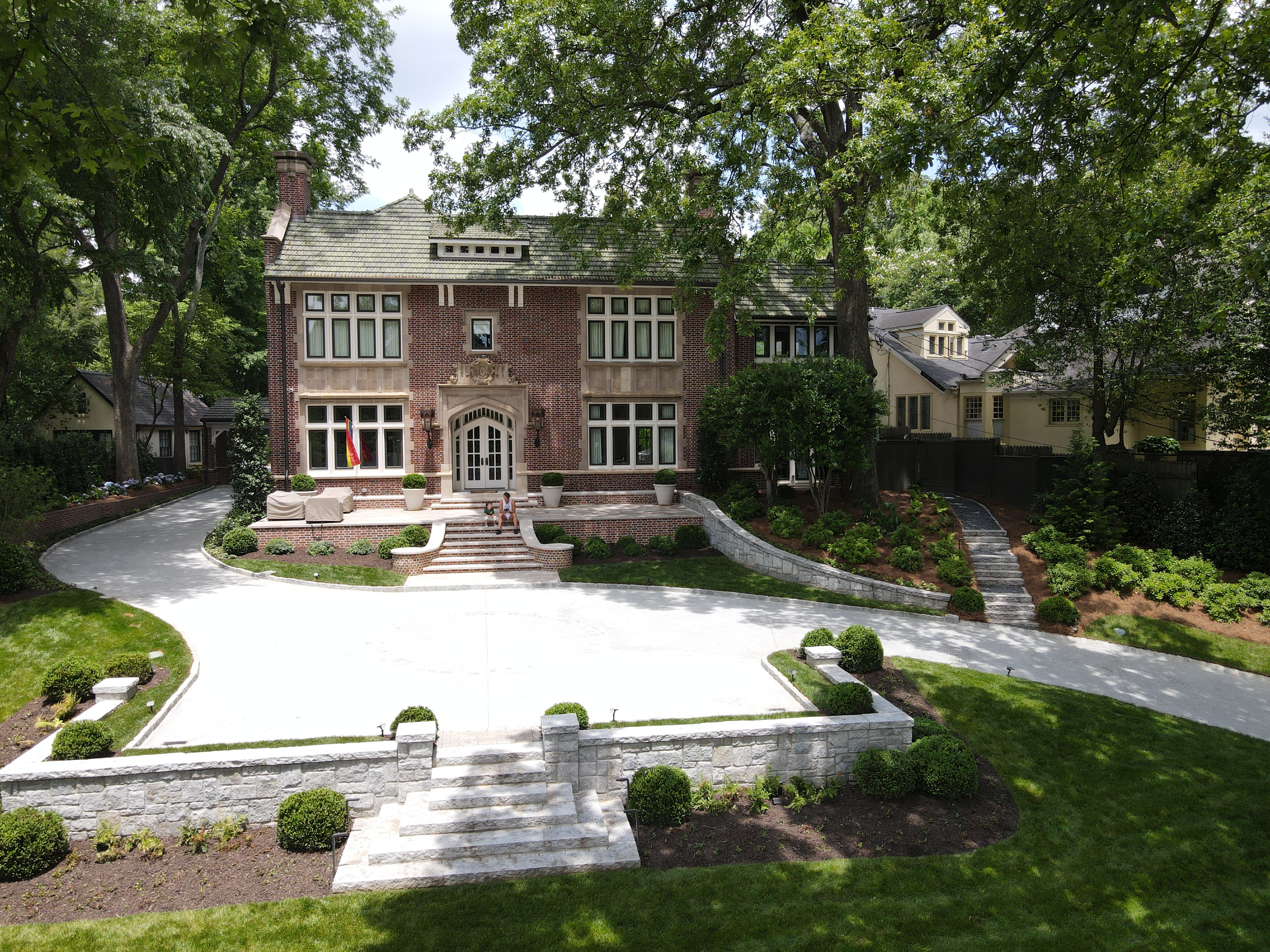
Edward Lyle House
