= Owen Building (Columbia, South Carolina) =

- Owens Building
- U.S. National Register of Historic Places
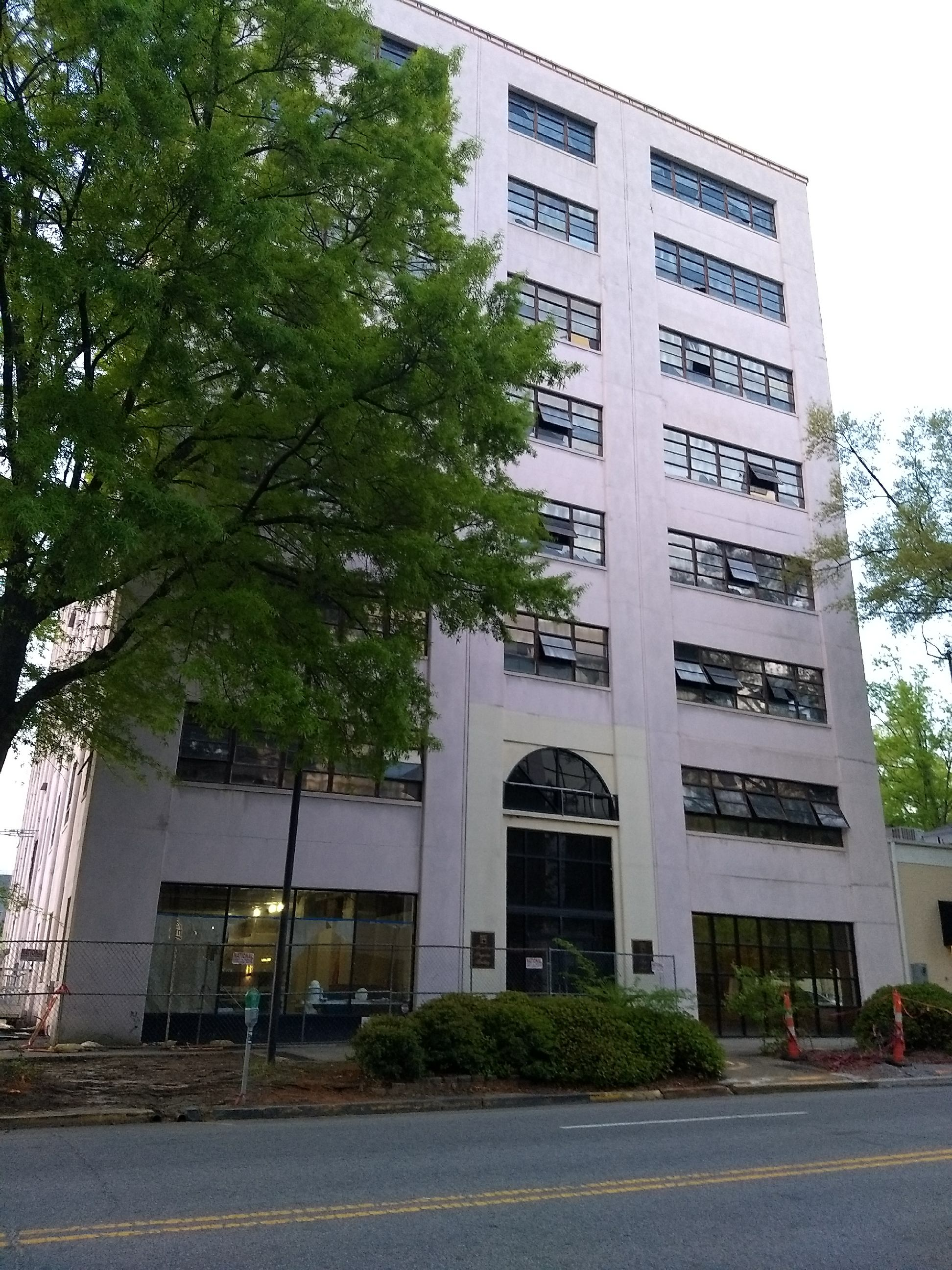

- Location within South Carolina Location within the United States
- Location: 1321 Lady St., Columbia, South Carolina
- Coordinates: 34°0′14″N 81°1′54″W
- Area: 0.1 acres (0.040 ha)
- Built: 1949
- Architectural style: Skyscraper
- NRHP reference No.: 13000398
- Added to NRHP: June 14, 2013

The Owen Building, known more recently as the Bruce Building, is a historic office building at 1321 Lady Street in Columbia, South Carolina. It is an eight-story concrete structure which was built in 1949 around the core of an older two-story brick building. It was designed by Lafaye, Lafaye, and Fair for local businessman Frank Owen, and was the first skyscraper built in the city after World War II. Its primary tenant for many years was Southern Bell Telephone Company, who in 1961 constructed an annex to the building to house computer equipment. It was purchased by the Seibels Bruce Insurance Company, another major tenant, in 1980. The building exterior has been relatively little-altered since its construction, and it retains some of its early internal features, including a period mail chute.

The building was listed on the National Register of Historic Places in 2013.

== See also ==
- National Register of Historic Places listings in Columbia, South Carolina
