= The Wave Transit System =

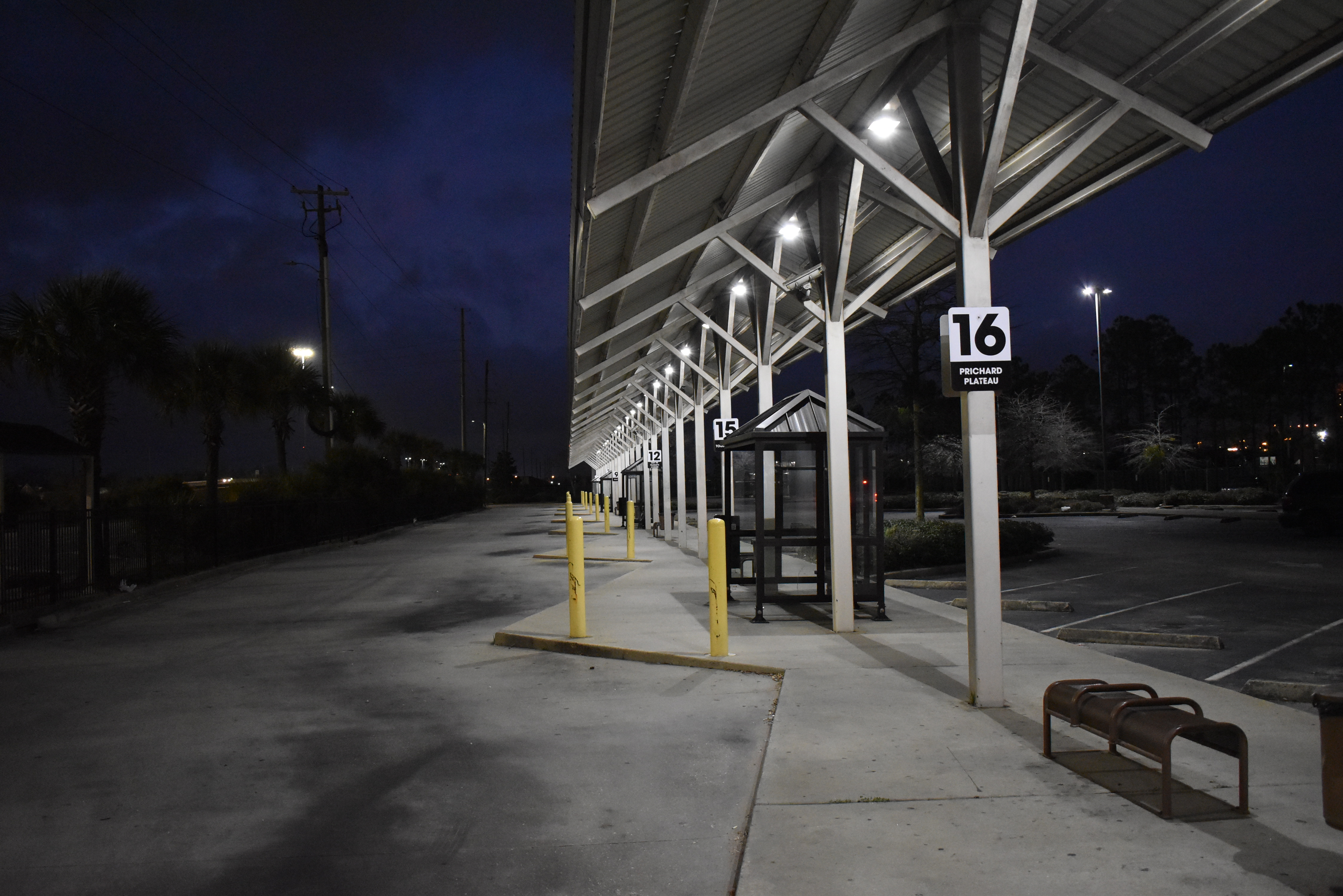
- The GM&O Transit Center at night
- Parent: City of Mobile
- Founded: 1995
- Headquarters: 110 Beauregard Street
- Locale: Gulf, Mobile and Ohio Passenger Terminal; Mobile, Alabama
- Service area: Mobile County, Alabama
- Service type: bus service, paratransit
- Routes: 13
- Daily ridership: 1,628 (2022)
- Annual ridership: 495,899 (2022)

The Wave Transit System is the operator of public transportation in Mobile, Alabama, operated by the City of Mobile. Eleven local routes service the city and suburban regions, while the modal trolley provides downtown shuttle service. Crossbay service via the Baylinc route service Baldwin County, Alabama. The cities of Spanish Fort, Daphne, Fairhope, and Point Clear have bus access to Downtown Mobile via US 98 and US 90.

== History ==
Mobile's public transportation was started in 1860 as the Mobile and Spring Hill Railway, a mule-drawn tram system. In 1892, the line was acquired by J. Howard Wilson and electrified. In 1893 Mobile Light & Railway was formed by the consolidation of the Mobile Electric Railway and the Mobile Electric Light & Power. In 1897, Mobile and Spring Hill Railway was combined into Mobile Light & Railway to form the Mobile Light & Railroad

Another system was started in 1887 under similar ownership as the Mobile and Spring Hill under the name Mobile Street Railway. It was sold in foreclosure in 1892 and was renamed the Mobile Street Railroad. By 1903, the Mobile Street Railroad was combined into Mobile Light & Railroad. After the death of J. Howard Wilson in 1939, Mobile Light & Railroad was acquired by National City Lines and renamed Mobile City Lines. Mobile City Lines converted the system to buses. In 1971, the bus lines were taken over by the Mobile Transit Authority. Mobile Transit Authority collapsed in 1995 and the operations were taken over by the City of Mobile under the name Metro Transit. In 2005, Metro Transit was renamed The Wave.

== Route list ==
Number	Name	Frequency	Operation		Link	Notes
Number	Name	Frequency	Week days	Satur days	Link	Notes
1	Airport	60 min	6:00; 18:45	7:00; 18:50	link	
4	Spring Hill	60 min	5:00; 18:55	6:30; 18:30	link	Saturday service only between Downtown and Zeigler/University
5	Highway 45	60 min	5:25; 18:55	6:25; 18:55	link	
7	Dauphin Street	60 min	5:25; 20:50	6:25; 20:50	link	
9	Broad /Southside /Bel Air Mall	60 min	5:10; 21:55	6:10; 21:55	link	
10	Crosstown	60 min	5:05; 21:55	6:05; 21:55	link	
11	Dauphin Island Parkway	60 min	5:20; 18:40	6:30; 18:25	link	Saturday service only between Downtown and Fulbrook Shopping Center
12	Highway 90 /Tillman's Corner	60 min	6:00; 18:55	7:00; 19:55	link	
15	Toulminville	60 min	5:30; 18:40	6:30; 18:40	link	
16	Plateau /Prichard	25 min	5:30; 18:25	6:30; 18:25	link	This route serves as a transit hub connection between Prichard, Al and Downtown Mobile, Al.
18	Cottage Hill /USA	60 min	5:35; 18:55	7:00; 18:55	link	Saturday service only between Bel Air Mall and Cottage Hill Shopping Center
19	Schillinger /Airport Boulevard	60 min	5:30; 19:30	6:30; 18:30	link	Flex service, with scheduled transfers to route 1 at Providence Hospital
Moda (downtown shuttle)		20 min	7:00; 14:00	-	link	Service extended during special events

== Fixed route ridership ==
The ridership statistics shown here are of fixed route services only and do not include demand response services.

== See also ==
- List of bus transit systems in the United States
- GM&O Transit Center
