= South Central Bell =

Telephone company serving the South-Central US

South Central Bell Telephone Company
- Type: Subsidiary
- Industry: Telecommunications
- Predecessor: Southern Bell
- Founded: 1968; 58 years ago
- Fate: Merged
- Successor: BellSouth Telecommunications
- Headquarters: Birmingham, Alabama, U.S.
- Area served: Alabama, Kentucky, Louisiana, Mississippi, Tennessee
- Parent: AT&T (1968–1983); BellSouth (1984–2006); The "new" AT&T (2006–present)

South Central Bell Telephone Company, headquartered in Birmingham, Alabama, was the name of the Bell System's operations in Alabama, Kentucky, Louisiana, Mississippi and Tennessee. South Central Bell was created in July 1968 when the Bell telephone operations in those states were split off from Southern Bell. South Central Bell was headquartered in (what is now) the AT&T City Center building in Birmingham.

South Central Bell logo, 1968-1969

In 1984, South Central Bell became a subsidiary of BellSouth Corporation as part of the breakup of the Bell System, effectively reuniting South Central Bell with Southern Bell. The two companies were officially reunited in 1992 when Southern Bell and South Central Bell became BellSouth Telecommunications. The two names were used, however, until 1995. The service network itself still exists and performs business and operates as the "new" AT&T.
