= Southern Bell Telephone Company Building =

Historic building in Atlanta, Georgia, US

- U.S. National Register of Historic Places
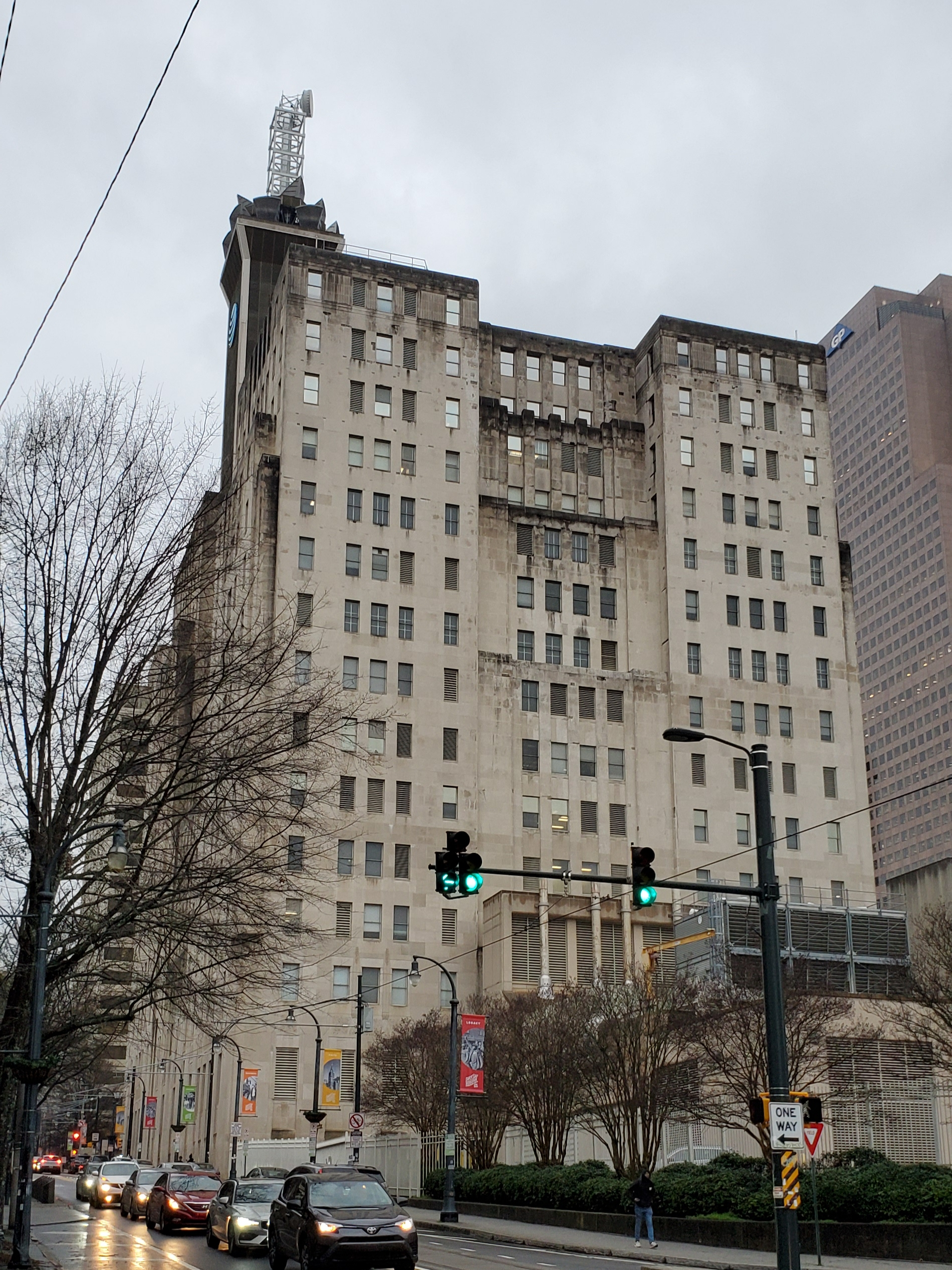
- AT&T Communications Building (2020)

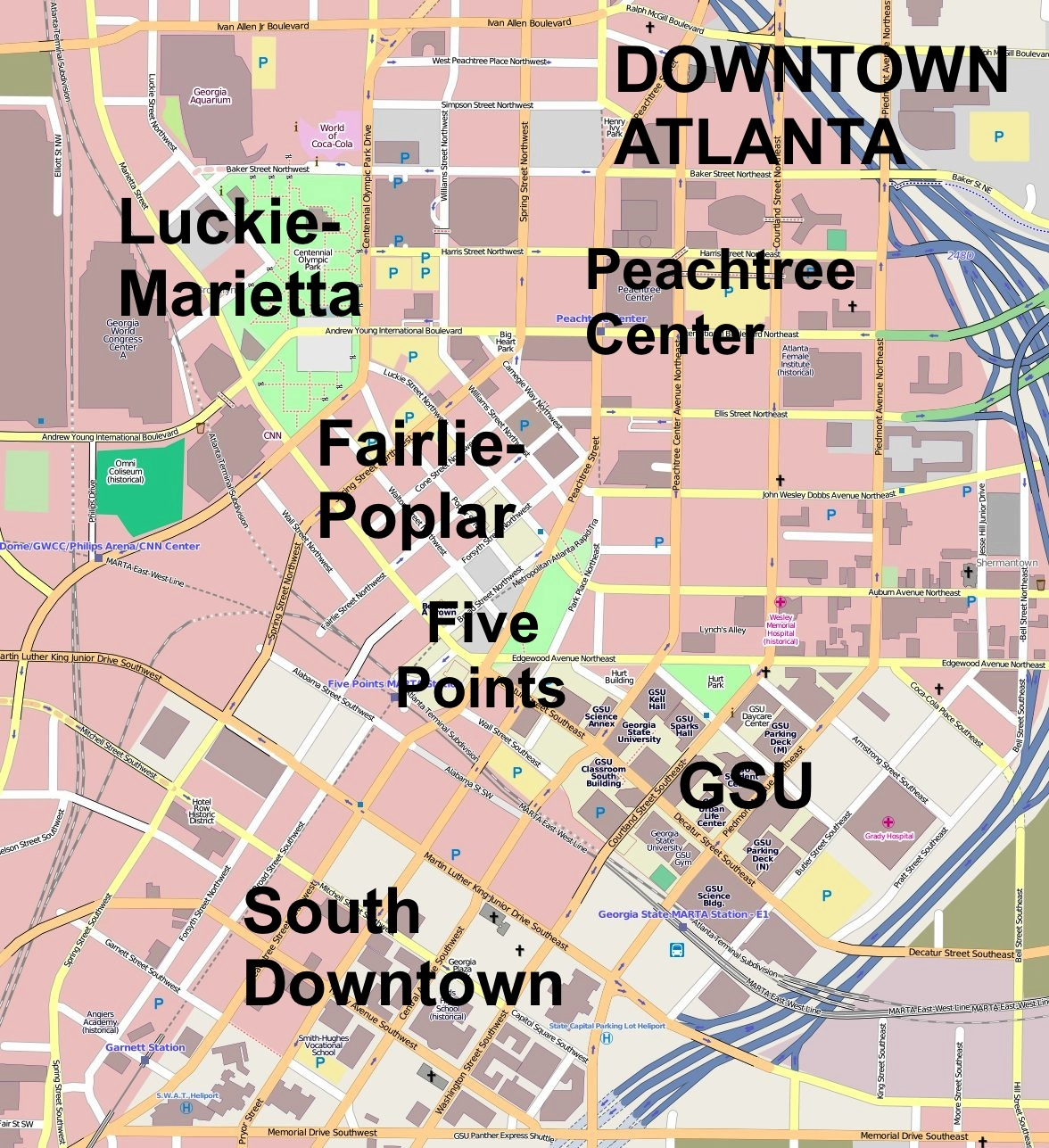
- Location within Downtown Atlanta Location within Atlanta Location within Georgia Location within the United States
- Location: 51 Peachtree Center Ave. NE; Atlanta, Georgia
- Coordinates: 33°45′20″N 84°23′8″W
- Built: 1929
- Architect: Marye, Alger & Vinour
- Architectural style: Art deco
- NRHP reference No.: 78000985
- Added to NRHP: December 01, 1978

The Southern Bell Telephone Company Building, now known as the AT&T Communications Building, is the main telephone exchange for downtown Atlanta, Georgia. It is located at 51 Peachtree Center Avenue, on the northeast corner of Auburn Avenue.

It was designed for Southern Bell by Marye, Alger and Vinour, in an austere art deco style. Originally planned to be 25 stories in height, which would have made it the tallest building in Atlanta, it was completed in 1929 at six stories. Additions in 1947, 1948 and 1963 brought it to its present 14 stories.

The building is crowned by a microwave communications tower.
