= Sylvia Roberts =

American lawyer (1933–2014)

Sylvia Roberts (1933–2014) was an American lawyer known for legal work on behalf of patients at the East Louisiana State Hospital's Forensic Unit, for the National Organization for Women's (NOW) Legal Defense and Education Fund (LDEF), as an educator and advocate for the legal rights of women in Louisiana, and on the behalf of victims of domestic violence. Roberts known for representing Lorena Weeks in Weeks v. Southern Bell, the first legal victory in which the National Organization for Women used Title VII of the Civil Rights Act to fight gender-based discrimination.

She served as NOW's first Southern Regional Director and as president of the NOW Legal Defense and Education Fund (currently Legal Momentum) (1972–1974).

Her lifelong advocacy on behalf of the victims of mental illness, workplace discrimination, the legal system, and domestic abuse was exemplified through her tireless pursuit of legal justice and efforts to educate the public.

== Early life and education ==
Roberts was born on January 6, 1933, in Bryan, Texas, and grew up in Lafayette, Louisiana.

Roberts attended the University of California, Los Angeles and graduated in 1953. Although she had never seen a woman lawyer, Roberts was determined to become one. While she was accepted into the law school at UCLA, she returned to her home state of Louisiana to attend law school at Louisiana State University in Baton Rouge (where she was one of three women in the school) and Tulane University Law School. Roberts left law school at Louisiana State University due to hostility from her male classmates and professors. She chose Tulane Law School to finish her studies because there were more women and she "was not an object of curiosity there." She graduated from Tulane University Law School in 1956. After graduation from Tulane University Law School, Roberts spent one year at the Sorbonne in Paris studying comparative law where she hoped for a more gender-inclusive experience compared to the law practices of Louisiana.

== Early career ==
Upon returning to Louisiana, Roberts clerked for the chief justice of the state supreme court because the career placement officer she consulted was opposed to women lawyers and there were not any law firms in New Orleans accepting female applicants. She then worked for the law firm of H. Alva Brumfield in New Orleans as a secretary and, later, as a lawyer in their Baton Rouge office These early years of Roberts' legal career were spent representing plaintiffs in insurance and malpractice lawsuits.

=== Work with the East Louisiana State Hospital Forensic Unit ===
In 1964, Roberts began working with patients at the East Louisiana State Hospital's Forensic Unit. She effectively used the legal system to fight for better hospital facilities, to improve patient care, and to increase the availability of mental health treatment in Louisiana. She also served as chairman of the subcommittee on mental illness of the Louisiana Governor's Commission on Law Enforcement and Criminal Justice.

== NOW and NOW legal defense and education fund ==
In 1966, Roberts joined the newly founded National Organization for Women, although she was not a founding member. She was quickly recruited to serve on the NOW Legal Committee where she was integral to NOW's litigation strategy. Marguerite Rawait and the other lawyers of the NOW Legal Committee, focused on sex discrimination cases in hopes of utilizing Title VII of the Civil Rights Act to strike down the protective labor laws which were preventing women from equal employment and payment and create a legal precedent. In 1967 the lawsuit of Lorena Weeks against the Southern Bell Telephone Company provided a venue through which to test this strategy.

=== Weeks v. Southern Bell ===
In 1969, with the support of the NOW Legal Committee, Roberts argued the first sex discrimination case appealed under Title VII of the Civil Rights Act of 1964: Weeks v. Southern Bell. The decision in this case stated that employers could not refuse to consider a woman for a job unless "all or substantially all women" could be proven incapable of performing the tasks required. In addition to the judgment, the judge ordered that Weeks be promoted to switchman and Weeks received $31,000 in back pay and commuting expenses. The ruling was a huge victory for women and for NOW, proving NOW's investment in arguing sex discrimination lawsuits could have a positive result.

Weeks had worked as an operator for many years when she applied for a higher paying position as a switchman at Southern Bell. She was denied on the grounds of a Georgia state law that women employees could not be made to lift anything heavier than thirty pounds. After losing her legal appeal in district court, Weeks began writing all company reports by hand in protest, rather than carry her thirty-four-pound typewriter to her desk, which resulted in her suspension. Roberts represented Weeks in her subsequent appeal before the Fifth Circuit, during which she successfully argued that the idea that no woman could lift more than thirty pounds was illogical, given that many women routinely carry children weighing thirty pounds or more.

Her small stature of 5'2", was advantageous during Weeks v. Southern Bell when she used all the tools involved in a switchman's job as evidence, walking around the courtroom carrying each item and demonstrating the absurdity and discrimination of the weight limitation rules.

=== Founding of NOW LDEF ===
After their success with the Weeks case, Roberts and Rawait decided to formalize the NOW Legal Committee by creating the NOW Legal Defense and Education Fund which would, theoretically, provide funding for their litigation efforts. Unfortunately, funding for the LDEF, whose purpose was to combat sexist policies and discrimination, was harder to come by than anticipated.

Roberts became the first President of the NOW LDEF in 1972, a role she held for 2 years. Under her leadership, NOW LDEF would educate women about sex discrimination and evaluate potential cases brought forth by local and regional NOW chapters to choose which had the greatest potential for success. While President, Roberts also served as general counsel of the LDEF, representing women in employment discrimination cases, and as an educator. Roberts stated in an interview:

''Education and litigation were used to balance each other..We were in a position of having to tell the American people that discrimination is unfair, it's not the American way. We felt it necessary to develop projects on education."

In 1974, Mary Jean Tully became the new President of the NOW LDEF, and Roberts was free to focus more intently on her role as an LDEF lawyer.

=== Work for NOW LDEF 1960s-1970s ===
From the mid-1960s through the 1970s, Roberts represented many women in sexual discrimination cases on behalf of LDEF often citing Title VII of the Civil Rights Act of 1964. These cases spanned a range of employment fields from academia, to industrial manufacturing, to healthcare. Some of these cases include Johnson v. University of Pittsburgh, Cussler v. University of Maryland, Braden v. University of Pittsburgh.

When not preparing and arguing cases on behalf of LDEF, Roberts focused on the legal rights and status of women in Louisiana. She served as Secretary to the Louisiana Commission on the Status of Women (1970-1973), was a member of the National News Council, and chair of the committee on the Rights of Women of the American Bar Association. During this time, Roberts also collaborated with fellow members of the Association for Women Attorneys on Corpus Christi Parish Credit Union v. Selina K. Martin, a 1978 case which led to the end Louisiana's Head and Master laws.

=== Founding of Baton Rouge NOW ===
Roberts and Roberta Madden teamed up to found a Baton Rouge chapter of the National Organization for Women. Roberts served as NOW's first southern regional director. A the southern regional director, Roberts travelled around the southern United States spreading information about women's issues and helping women organize chapters of NOW. Roberts said, "I didn't want people to think of the movement as something out of New York, as just about abortion rights and ERA. I wanted it to be meaningful to them, wanted them to use NOW to make real progress for women."

=== Later career ===
By the early 1980s, Roberts shifted her efforts to focus almost exclusively on Louisiana women. She worked to educate Louisiana women about their legal rights with respect to marriage, separation, and divorce. In 1981, she incorporated The Legal Picture, Inc, an organization dedicated to educating Louisiana residents about their legal rights. In the early 1990s, Roberts refocused her attentions to the awareness and prevention of domestic violence. In 1995, Roberts successfully represented Lynn Gildersleeve Michelli in Michelli v. Michelli, the first case to define the phrase "history of family violence".

== Death ==
Roberts remained active with the National Women's Political Caucus of Baton Rouge, V.O.I.C.E.S., and other small organizations until she died in Baton Rouge, Louisiana in 2014.

== Advocacy ==
=== NOW Judicial Education Project ===
With fellow NOW LDEF member, Marilyn Hall Patel, Roberts created the first Judicial Education Project which presented sexual discrimination research material to judges as part of their training.

=== Abolition of Head and Master laws of Louisiana ===
In her capacity as Southern Regional Director of NOW, Roberts traveled the southern United States helping spread the ideas of feminism and found new chapters of NOW. She also visited various Louisiana women's clubs and organizations to spread information about Louisiana's Head and Master laws. Roberts collaborated with several other lawyers on Corpus Christi Parish Credit Union v. Selina K. Martin, a 1978 case which led to the end Louisiana's Head and Master laws.

=== Rape crisis advocacy ===
In 1978, Roberts served as a moderator at a public hearing on rape which was co-sponsored by the Mayor's Commission on the Needs of Women of Lafayette, the National Organization for Women, the League of Women Voters, the American Association of University Women, and two local women's advocacy groups, Onyx and Les Amis.

=== Educating on the legal rights of Louisianans ===
Continuing her efforts toward education, Roberts incorporated The Legal Picture, Inc. in 1981. The purpose of this organization was to educated Louisiana citizens about their legal rights.

=== Domestic Violence Prevention Advocacy ===
Roberts became involved with efforts to prevent domestic violence in the 1980s. With Lynn Gildersleeve, whom Roberts represented in Michelli v. Michelli, Roberts co-founded V.O.I.C.E.S. (Violence Only Increases Crime, Educate to Stop it), an organization dedicated to preventing abuse through educational programs with children and teenagers.

== Recognition and awards ==
As a result of her work on behalf of the mentally ill, Roberts received commendations from the Louisiana Psychological Association and the Louisiana Association for Mental Health.

In 2008, Roberts was honored by the Veteran Feminists of America (VFA) during its Salute to Feminist Lawyers 1963-1975. She was a member of the VFA's Honorary Board.

In 2016, Roberts was posthumously inducted into the Tulane Law School Hall of Fame.

== Legacy ==
Roberts's activism inspired many women to get involved in the feminist movement, including Karline Tierney who was also involved in the American Association of University Women (AAUW). Together Tierney and Roberts helped build a coalition to lobby the Louisiana Legislature to ratify the Equal Rights Amendment. Roberts later represented Tierney in a lawsuit against Rollins trucking company.

Her personal and professional papers have been archived at the following institutions:

- the Newcomb Archives, part of the Newcomb Institute of Tulane University
- the Louisiana and Lower Mississippi Valley Collections Louisiana State University Libraries, Baton Rouge, LA as the Sylvia Roberts Papers, Mss. 3259.
- the University Archives and Acadiana Manuscripts Collection at Edith Garland Dupré Library, University of Louisiana at Lafayette as the Sylvia Roberts Collection, COLL 186.
