= BellSouth Telecommunications =

Operating company of AT&T that serves the southeastern United States

BellSouth Telecommunications, LLC
- Formerly: SBT&T Co. Southern Bell Telephone and Telegraph Company
- Company type: Subsidiary
- Industry: Telecommunications
- Predecessor: Southern Bell, South Central Bell
- Founded: 1983; 43 years ago
- Defunct: 2007; 19 years ago
- Fate: Absorbed into AT&T
- Headquarters: AT&T Midtown Center; Atlanta, Georgia, United States
- Area served: Southeastern United States
- Key people: David Scobey (president)
- Products: POTS, DSL
- Parent: BellSouth Corporation (1984–2006); AT&T (2006–2007)
- Website: www.att.com www.bellsouth.com

BellSouth Telecommunications, LLC was a telecommunications company that operated in the southeastern United States. It consisted of the former operations of Southern Bell and South Central Bell and was a subsidiary of BellSouth Corporation, which was acquired by AT&T on December 29, 2006. With the merger completed, BellSouth Telecommunications began doing business as AT&T Southeast.

== History ==
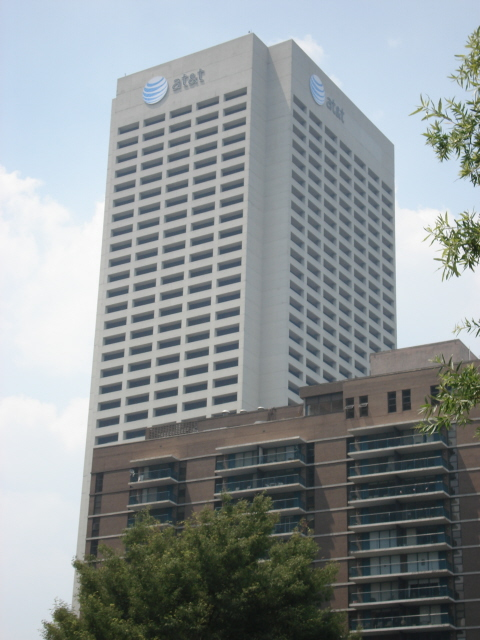
AT&T Midtown Center, BellSouth Telecommunications (d/b/a AT&T Southeast) headquarters, Atlanta

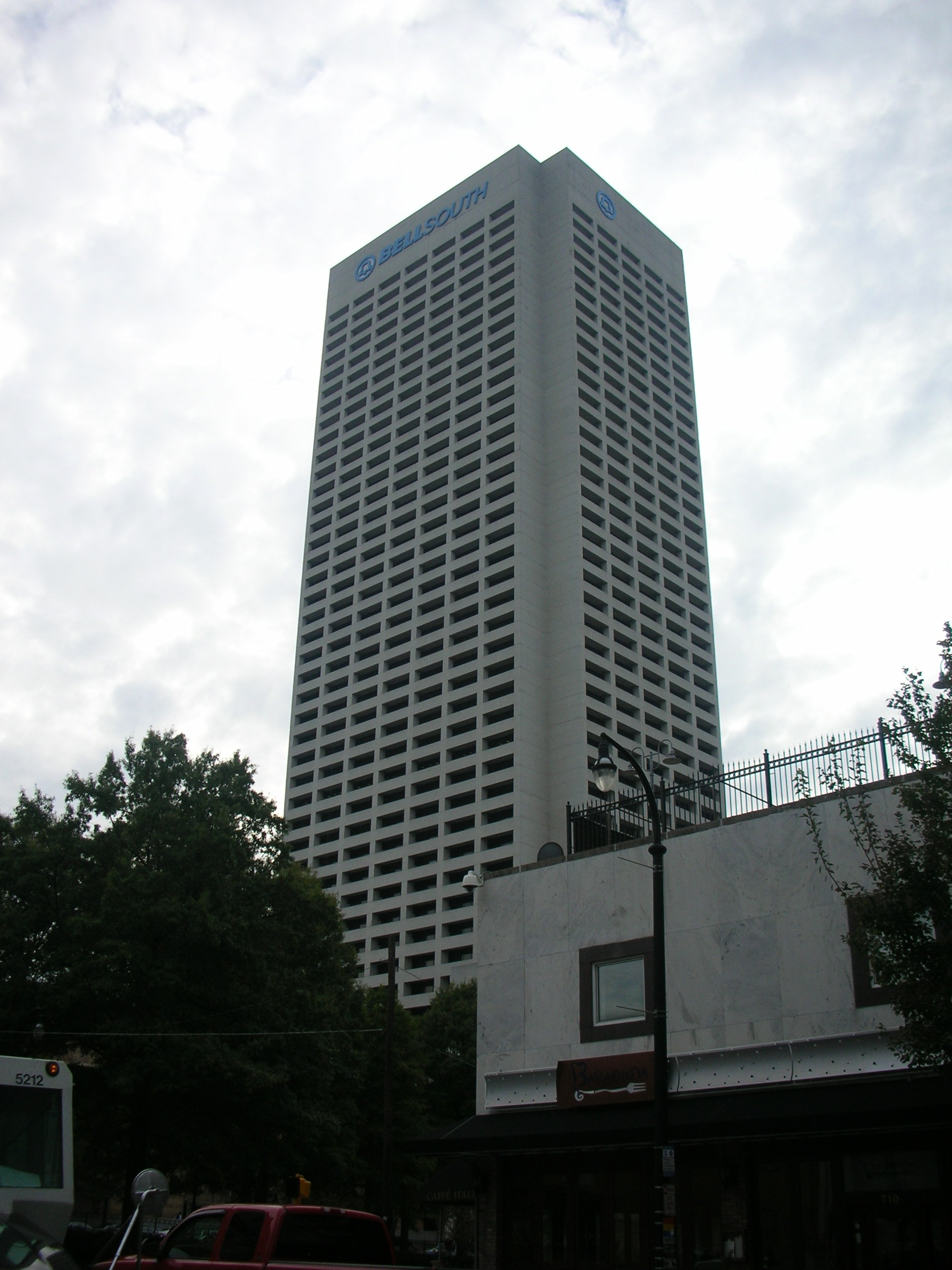
BellSouth Telecommunications HQ, Atlanta, prior to AT&T acquisition

BellSouth Telecommunications was formed in 1992 when BellSouth Corporation consolidated its operating companies, South Central Bell and Southern Bell, into one entity. It was a wholly-owned by BellSouth Corporation.

In 1995, South Central Bell and Southern Bell were officially dropped and only BellSouth Telecommunications, Inc. was used in marketing.

On March 5, 2006, AT&T (SBC after acquiring the original AT&T) announced its intentions to acquire BellSouth Corporation, and, on December 29, 2006, BellSouth Telecommunications became an operating company of AT&T The merger also consolidated the ownership of Cingular Wireless, which became AT&T Mobility.

In 2025, the U.S. Equal Employment Opportunity Commission (EEOC) filed a lawsuit against BellSouth, alleging that the company violated the Americans with Disabilities Act. BellSouth enforced 275-pound weight limit for its employees, intended to screen out those with Class III obesity.
