= Meridian Transit System =

- Headquarters: 1901 Front St.
- Locale: Meridian, Mississippi
- Service area: Lauderdale County, Mississippi
- Service type: Bus service, Paratransit
- Routes: 5

The Meridian Transit System was the primary provider of mass transportation in Lauderdale County, Mississippi. It ceased operation in 2012 due to a lack of funding.

== Routes ==
- 1 Bonita Lakes
- 2 East
- 4 Broadmoor
- 6 College
- 8 West
