= Mobile station (Gulf, Mobile and Ohio Railroad) =

- Gulf, Mobile and Ohio Passenger Terminal
- U.S. National Register of Historic Places
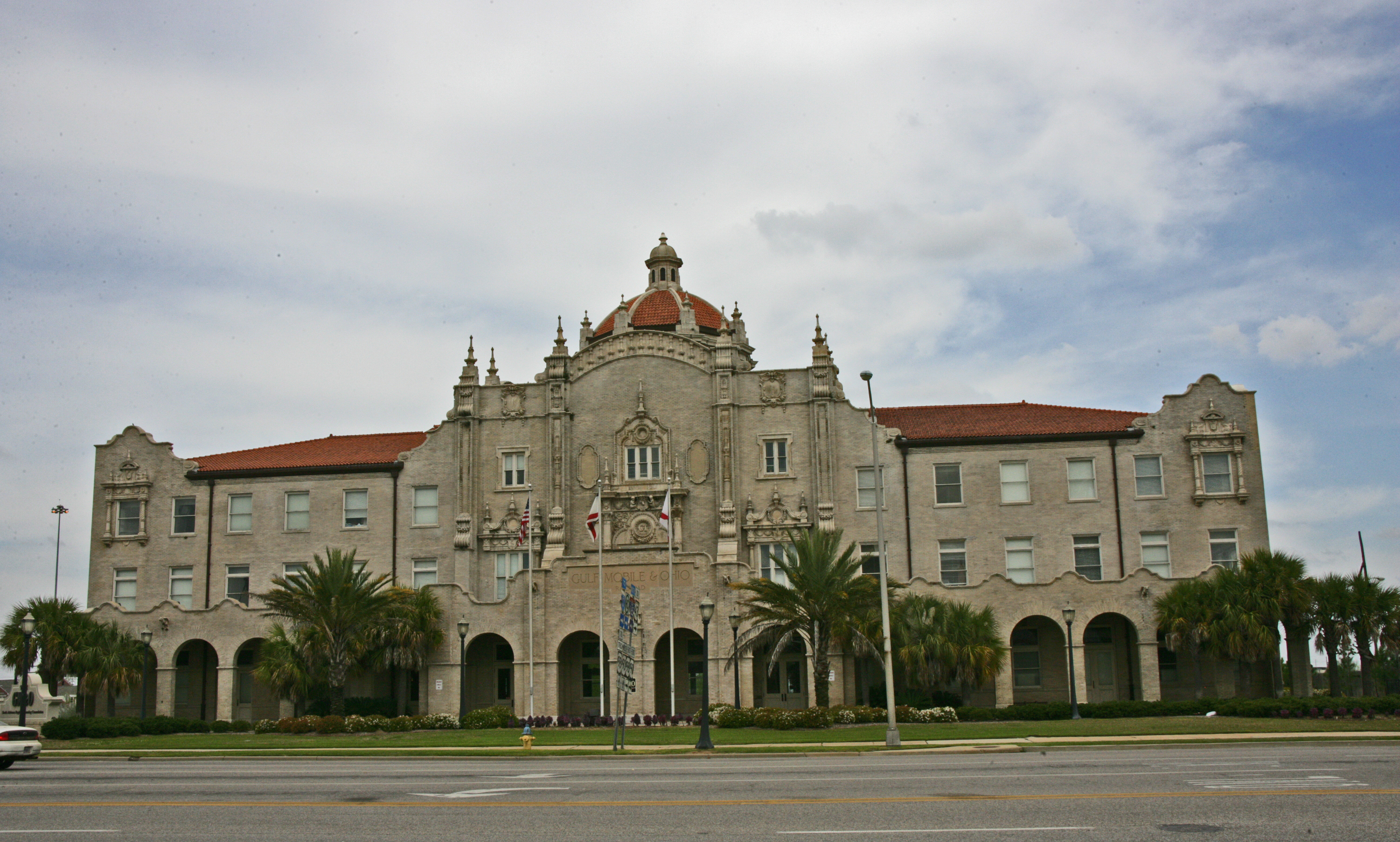
- The Gulf, Mobile and Ohio Passenger Terminal in 2008.

- Location within Mobile, Alabama Location within Alabama Location within the United States
- Location: 110 Beauregard St, Mobile, Alabama
- Coordinates: 30°42′1″N 88°2′44″W
- Built: 1907
- Architect: Marye, P. Thornton
- Architectural style: Mission/Spanish Revival
- NRHP reference No.: 75000323
- Added to NRHP: August 15, 1975

The Gulf, Mobile and Ohio Passenger Terminal is a historic train station in Mobile, Alabama, United States. Architect P. Thornton Marye designed the Mission Revival style terminal for the Mobile and Ohio Railroad and its then-parent company Southern Railway. It was completed in 1907 at a total cost of $575,000. The Mobile and Ohio merged with the Gulf, Mobile and Northern Railroad in 1940 to form the Gulf, Mobile and Ohio Railroad.

== Trains in final years ==
Major trains served:

- Gulf, Mobile & Ohio:
  - Gulf Coast Rebel: St. Louis, Missouri–Mobile
- Southern Railway:
  - Goldenrod: Birmingham, Alabama–Mobile

== Demise ==
The last GM&O passenger trains into Mobile terminal station were the Gulf Coast Rebels, which made their last runs on October 14, 1958. Louisville & Nashville passenger service in Mobile called at a separate L&N station located about 1 mile distant. Passenger service in the Amtrak era continued at the former L&N passenger station Mobile station. GM&O Terminal Station continued to serve as railroad offices. It was placed on the National Register of Historic Places on August 15, 1975. It had suffered neglect, extensive interior alteration, and partial removal of the train shed by this time. GM&O's successor Illinois Central Gulf Railroad vacated the old terminal building in 1986 and for fifteen years it suffered from demolition-by-neglect. The Alabama Historical Commission and the Alabama Trust for Historic Preservation named it as one of their "Places in Peril" in 1996. In 2001 the City of Mobile and a private company invested more than $18 million to restore the local landmark with the developer taking advantage of the Federal Historic Preservation Tax Incentive program. Today the building houses private offices and the city's The Wave Transit System. The renovated facility was extensively damaged by flooding during Hurricane Katrina.

== See also ==
- Mobile station (Amtrak)

| Preceding station | Gulf, Mobile and Ohio Railroad | Following station |
|---|---|---|
| Terminus | Main Line | Semmers toward St. Louis |
| Brichard toward Dyersburg | Dyersburg - Mobile | Terminus |
| Preceding station | Southern Railway | Following station |
| Terminus | Mobile – Birmingham | Chickasaw toward Birmingham |
