= Louisville Division =

Railway division of CSX Transportation

The Louisville Division is a railroad division operated by CSX Transportation in the U.S. states of Illinois, Indiana, Kentucky, Ohio, Tennessee, and Virginia. The Louisville Division comprises 29 subdivisions.

The subdivisions within the Louisville Division are as follows:

- Big Sandy Subdivision
- CC Subdivision
- CV Subdivision
- C&N Subdivision (note 1)
- Central Ohio Subdivision (note 1)
- Cincinnati Subdivision
- Cincinnati Terminal Subdivision
- Coal Run Subdivision
- Corbin Terminal Subdivision
- E&BV Subdivision
- EK Subdivision
- Hoosier Subdivision
- Illinois Subdivision
- Indiana Subdivision
- Indianapolis Subdivision
- LCL Subdivision
- LH&StL Subdivision
- Long Fork Subdivision
- Louisville Terminal Subdivision
- Main Line Subdivision
- Middletown Subdivision
- Midland Subdivision (note 2)
- Northern Subdivision
- Old Road Subdivision
- Richmond Subdivision
- Rockhouse Subdivision
- Russell Subdivision
- SV&E Subdivision
- Toledo Subdivision

- Note 1: This line is now operated by the Columbus and Ohio River Railroad
- Note 2: This line is now operated by the Indiana and Ohio Railway

== See also ==
- List of CSX Transportation lines
