= New York Central Lines LLC =

American railroad line company

New York Central Lines LLC was a limited liability company that owned railroad lines in the United States that are owned and operated by CSX Transportation. The company was formed in 1998 to own Conrail lines assigned to CSX in the split of Conrail between CSX and the Norfolk Southern Railway; operations were switched over on June 1, 1999. The company was named after the old New York Central Railroad, whose old main line became a line of the new company. In November 2003, the Surface Transportation Board approved a plan allowing CSX to fully absorb New York Central Lines, which was done on August 27, 2004.

== List of lines ==
CSX's name	Conrail's name	Notes
Baldwinsville Subdivision	Baldwinsville Secondary (part)	
Belt Subdivision	Belt Line Branch	
Bergen Subdivision	River Line (part)	
Berkshire Subdivision	Boston Line (part)	
Boston Subdivision	Boston Line (part)	
Buffalo Terminal Subdivision	Chicago Line (part)	
Carman Subdivision	Carman Branch	
Castleton Subdivision	Selkirk Branch (part)	
Cleveland Terminal Subdivision	Chicago Line (part)	
Columbus Line Subdivision	Columbus Line	
Crawfordsville Branch Subdivision	Crawfordsville Branch	
Danville Secondary Subdivision	Danville Secondary	
Erie West Subdivision	Chicago Line (part)	
Fairgrounds Subdivision	Baldwinsville Secondary (part)	
Fall River Subdivision	Fall River Secondary	
Fitchburg Subdivision	Fitchburg Secondary	
Framingham Subdivision	Framingham Secondary	
Frankfort Secondary Subdivision	Frankfort Secondary	
Fulton Subdivision	Fulton Secondary	
Greenwich Subdivision	Indianapolis Line (part)	
Harrisburg Subdivision	Harrisburg Line (part)	
Herbert Subdivision	Herbert Secondary	
Hudson Subdivision	Chicago Line (part) and Hudson Line	
Indianapolis Line Subdivision	Indianapolis Line (part)	
Indianapolis Terminal Subdivision	Indianapolis Line (part) and St. Louis Line (part)	
Lake Shore Subdivision	Chicago Line (part)	
Landover Subdivision	Landover Line	
Lockport Subdivision	Lockport Branch	
Louisville Secondary Subdivision	Louisville Secondary	
Middleboro Subdivision	Middleboro Secondary (part)	
Mohawk Subdivision	Chicago Line (part)	
Montreal Subdivision	Montreal Branch	Now owned by St. Lawrence and Adirondack Railway and Canadian National
Mount Victory Subdivision	Indianapolis Line (part)	
New Bedford Subdivision	New Bedford Secondary	
Niagara Subdivision	Niagara Branch	Ended near Whirlpool Rapids Bridge near border with Canada at CSX Transportation Niagara Falls Yard.
Olin Secondary Subdivision	Olin Running Track	
Popes Creek Subdivision	Pope's Creek Secondary	
Port Subdivision	Albany Secondary	
Porter Subdivision	Porter Branch	
Post Road Subdivision	Post Road Branch	owned by Amtrak
River Subdivision	River Line (part)	
Rochester Subdivision	Chicago Line (part)	
Schodack Subdivision	Selkirk Branch (part)	
Scottslawn Subdivision	Scottslawn Secondary and Western Branch (part)	
Selkirk Subdivision	Chicago Line (part) and Selkirk Branch	
Shelbyville Secondary Subdivision	Shelbyville Secondary	
Short Line Subdivision	Short Line	
Somerset Railroad Subdivision	Somerset Secondary	owned by the Somerset Railroad
St. Lawrence Subdivision	Montreal Secondary	Did not enter into Canada and ended at junction with Montreal Subdivision in Massena NY near CSX Massena Yard.
St. Louis Line Subdivision	St. Louis Line	
Toledo Branch Subdivision	Toledo Branch	
Trenton Subdivision	Trenton Line	
West Shore Subdivision	West Shore Branch	

== See also ==
- List of CSX Transportation lines
- Pennsylvania Lines LLC
