= List of CSX Transportation lines =

CSX Transportation owns and operates a vast network of rail lines in the United States east of the Mississippi River. In addition to the major systems which merged to form CSX – the Baltimore and Ohio Railroad, Chesapeake and Ohio Railway, Louisville and Nashville Railroad, Atlantic Coast Line Railroad and Seaboard Air Line Railroad – it also owns major lines in the Northeastern United States acquired from the 1999 breakup of Conrail.

The lines are split into two regions – Northern and Southern, further split into divisions (five in the Northern region and four in the Southern), and finally into subdivisions, most of which consist of a single main line with short branches.

== Active lines ==
=== CSX Northern Region === ==== Albany Division ====
| Subdivision | From | To | Notes |
|---|---|---|---|
| Baldwinsville Subdivision | Solvay, New York | Baldwinsville, New York | Former Delaware, Lackawanna and Western |
| Belt Subdivision | Buffalo, New York | Kenmore, New York | Former Conrail |
| Berkshire Subdivision | Schodack, New York | Springfield, Massachusetts | Part of former Conrail Boston Line, née New York Central (NYC) Boston & Albany. |
| Boston Subdivision | Worcester, Massachusetts | Springfield, Massachusetts | Part of former Conrail Boston Line, née NYC Boston & Albany. |
| Buffalo Terminal Subdivision | Depew, New York | Hamburg, New York | Part of former Conrail Chicago Line, née NYC Water Level Route. |
| Carman Subdivision | Schenectady, New York | | |
| Castleton Subdivision | Castleton-on-Hudson, New York | Ravena, New York | |
| Fair Grounds Subdivision | Syracuse, New York | Woodard, New York | |
| Fairless Branch | Woodbourne, Pennsylvania | Morrisville, Pennsylvania | |
| Fremont Industrial Track | Glendale, Queens | Port Morris, Bronx | |
| Fulton Subdivision | Liverpool, New York | Oswego, New York | |
| Lockport Subdivision | Lockport, New York | Niagara Falls, New York | Former New York Central line |
| Mohawk Subdivision | Hoffmans, New York | Verona, New York | Part of former Conrail Chicago Line, née NYC Mohawk Division/Water Level Route. Home of the Selkirk Foreign Power Team. This subdivision sees the most traffic of any within the Albany Division. The milepost prefix is QC, the dispatcher is NC Selkirk. |
| Montreal Subdivision | Massena, New York | Beauharnois, Quebec | Canadian National Rail Company announced on August 30, 2019 that it had signed an agreement to acquire the Massena rail line from CSX |
| Nashua Subdivision | Concord, New Hampshire | North Chelmsford, Massachusetts | Former Pan Am Railway Northern Main Line and Hillsboro Branch. |
| Niagara Subdivision | Buffalo, New York | Niagara Falls, New York | |
| Port Subdivision | Selkirk, New York | Albany, New York | |
| Portland Subdivision | Yarmouth, Maine | Littleton, Massachusetts | Former Pan Am Railway Freight Main Line, Brunswick, Mountain, and Portsmouth Branch |
| River Subdivision | Selkirk, New York | North Bergen, New Jersey | Former NYC West Shore Line, which also hosted the NYO&W through the 1950s. |
| Rochester Subdivision | Solvay, New York | Depew, New York | Former NYC main line |
| Selkirk Subdivision | Hoffmans, New York | Selkirk, New York | Former NYC |
| St. Lawrence Subdivision | Massena, New York | Syracuse, New York | Canadian National Rail Company announced on August 30, 2019 that it had signed an agreement to acquire the Massena rail line from CSX |
| Syracuse Terminal Subdivision | Verona, New York | Solvay, New York | Newly formed as of January 24, 2011 out of the western half of the Mohawk Subdivision |
| Trenton Subdivision | Manville, New Jersey | Philadelphia, Pennsylvania | MP QA4.4 (Philadelphia, Pennsylvania) to QA57.3 (Bound Brook, New Jersey), Former Reading Company mainline. |
| Waterville Subdivision | Mattawamkeag, ME | Yarmouth, Maine | Former Pan Am Railway Freight Main Line, Hinckley, and Rumford Branches |
| West Shore Subdivision | Fairport, New York | Churchville, New York | |
| Worcester Subdivision | Worcester, Massachusetts | Ayer, Massachusetts | Former Pan Am Railway Worcester Main Line. Shares short portion of trackage with P&W Gardner Subdivision. |
==== Baltimore Division ====
| Subdivision | From | To | Notes |
| Alexandria Extension | Capital Subdivision at Hyattsville, Maryland | RF&P Subdivision at Washington, D.C. | Part of Capital Subdivision |
| Baltimore Terminal Subdivision | Baltimore, Maryland | Halethorpe, Maryland | Former Baltimore and Ohio Railroad (B&O) original main line, oldest common carrier line in U.S. |
| Bridgeport Subdivision | Grafton, West Virginia | Clarksburg, West Virginia | Former B&O |
| Capital Subdivision | Baltimore, Maryland | Washington, D.C. | Used by MARC Camden Line trains. Former B&O Washington Branch. |
| Cumberland Subdivision | Brunswick, Maryland | Cumberland, Maryland | Former B&O |
| Cumberland Terminal Subdivision | Cumberland, Maryland | | Former B&O |
| Fairmont Subdivision | Grafton, West Virginia | Fairmont, West Virginia | Former B&O main line |
| Georges Creek Subdivision | Westernport, Maryland | Carlos, Maryland | Former Western Maryland Thomas Subdivision Now operated by Georges Creek Railway (GCK) |
| Hanover Subdivision | Baltimore, Maryland | Hagerstown, Maryland | Former Western Maryland (WM) through Gettysburg, Pennsylvania |
| Harrisburg Subdivision | Philadelphia, Pennsylvania | | |
| Herbert Subdivision | Brandywine, Maryland | Aquasco, Maryland | Former Pennsylvania Railroad (PRR) |
| Keystone Subdivision | Cumberland, Maryland | McKeesport, Pennsylvania | Former B&O |
| Landover Subdivision | Landover, Maryland | Anacostia, DC | Former PRR |
| Lurgan Subdivision | Shippensburg, Pennsylvania | Cherry Run, West Virginia | Former WM |
| Marietta Subdivision | Belpre, Ohio | Beverly, Ohio | Former B&O |
| Metropolitan Subdivision | Washington, D.C. | Weverton, Maryland | Used by MARC Brunswick Line trains. Formerly B&O Metropolitan Branch |
| Mon Subdivision | Brownsville, Pennsylvania | McKeesport, Pennsylvania | Mon is short for Monongahela |
| Mountain Subdivision | Cumberland, Maryland | Grafton, West Virginia | Former B&O main line |
| New Castle Terminal Subdivision | West Pittsburgh, Pennsylvania | New Castle, Pennsylvania | |
| Ohio River Subdivision | Wheeling, West Virginia | Guyandotte, West Virginia | Former B&O |
| Old Main Line Subdivision | Baltimore, Maryland | Point of Rocks, Maryland | Used by MARC to access the Frederick Branch. Former B&O, oldest common carrier line in U.S. |
| P&W Subdivision | Rankin, Pennsylvania | New Castle, Pennsylvania | Former B&O P&W = Pittsburgh & Western |
| Philadelphia Subdivision | Philadelphia, Pennsylvania | Baltimore, Maryland | Former B&O Royal Blue Line |
| Pittsburgh Subdivision | McKeesport, Pennsylvania | New Castle, Pennsylvania | Former Pittsburgh and Lake Erie Railroad |
| Pomeroy Subdivision | Kanauga Jct. (Gallipolis, Ohio) | Hobson (Middleport, Ohio) | |
| Popes Creek Subdivision | Bowie, Maryland | Bel Alton, Maryland | Former PRR |
| RF&P Subdivision | Washington, D.C. | Richmond, Virginia | Former Richmond, Fredericksburg and Potomac Railroad |
| S&C Subdivision | Rockwood, Pennsylvania | Johnstown, Pennsylvania | Former B&O S&C=Somerset & Cambria |
| Shenandoah Subdivision | Brunswick, Maryland | Strasburg Junction, Virginia | Former B&O |
| Short Line Subdivision | Clarksburg, West Virginia | New Martinsville, West Virginia | Former B&O |
| Stony River Subdivision | Bayard, West Virginia | Stony River, West Virginia | Former WM |
| Thomas Subdivision | Rawlings, Maryland | Bayard, West Virginia | Originally West Virginia Central and Pittsburg Railway; subsequently WM |
| W&P Subdivision | Pittsburgh, Pennsylvania | Washington, Pennsylvania | |
==== Chicago Division ====
| Subdivision | From | To | Notes |
| Altenheim Subdivision | North Lawndale, Chicago, Illinois | Forest Park, Illinois | |
| Barr Subdivision | Willow Creek, Indiana | Blue Island, Illinois | |
| Bay City Subdivision | Saginaw, Michigan | Bay City, Michigan | Leased to Saginaw Bay Southern in 2005 |
| Blue Island Subdivision | Blue Island, Illinois | North Lawndale, Chicago, Illinois | |
| Carrothers Secondary | Walbridge, Ohio | Woodville, Ohio | Former PRR Mansfield-Toledo-Detroit main line |
| Chicago Heights Subdivision | | | |
| Dean Subdivision | Saginaw, Michigan | Midland, Michigan | Leased to Saginaw Bay Southern in 2005, Now owned by Lake State Railway. |
| Decatur Secondary | | | |
| Detroit Subdivision | Plymouth, Michigan | Detroit, Michigan | |
| Essexville Subdivision | Bay City, Michigan | Essexville, Michigan | Leased to Saginaw Bay Southern in 2005, Now owned by Lake State Railway. |
| Fort Wayne Line/Secondary | Pittsburgh, Pennsylvania | Gary, Indiana | Line is owned by NS, and CSX. |
| Fremont Subdivision | Holland, Michigan | Fremont, Michigan | Leased to Mid-Michigan Railroad north of West Olive, Michigan in 2005. |
| Garrett Subdivision | Deshler, Ohio | Willow Creek, Indiana | |
| Grand Rapids Subdivision | Porter, Indiana | Grand Rapids, Michigan | |
| Grand Rapids Terminal Subdivision | Grand Rapids, Michigan | | |
| Lake Subdivision | East Chicago, Indiana | East Side, Chicago, Illinois | |
| Ludington Subdivision | Grand Rapids, Michigan | Ludington, Michigan | Leased to Marquette Rail in 2005 |
| Manistee Subdivision | Branch, Michigan | Manistee, Michigan | Leased to Marquette Rail in 2005 |
| Monon Subdivision | Maynard, Indiana | Cloverdale, Indiana | Lafayette subd merged into Monon |
| New Rock Subdivision | Blue Island, Illinois | Utica, Illinois | Iowa Interstate Railroad has trackage rights; Joliet, Illinois to Blue Island, Illinois over Metra trackage rights on the Rock Island District. Former Chicago, Rock Island and Pacific Railroad (Rock Island Line) main line. |
| Pemberville Subdivision | Toledo, Ohio | Fostoria, Ohio | Formerly the portion of the Columbus Subdivision north of Fostoria; created 2006.04.08 |
| Plymouth Subdivision | Grand Rapids, Michigan | Plymouth, Michigan | Former Lansing subdivision |
| Port Huron Subdivision | Port Huron, Michigan | Marine City, Michigan | |
| Porter Subdivision | Blue Island, Illinois | Porter, Indiana | |
| Saginaw Subdivision | Toledo, Ohio | Saginaw, Michigan | Since 2016, the section from Mt. Morris to Saginaw has been owned by the Lake State Railway. The Plymouth to Mt. Morris line was leased to Lake State Railway starting in March 2019. |
| Saginaw Terminal Subdivision | | | |
| Sarnia Subdivision | Chatham, ON | Sarnia, ON | Section between Sombra and Chatham abandoned. |
| Toledo Terminal Subdivision | | | |
| Woodland Subdivision | | | |
==== Great Lakes Division ====
| Subdivision | From | To | Notes |
| CL&W Subdivision | Sterling, Ohio | Lorain, Ohio | Former B&O (CL&W = Cleveland, Lorain & Wheeling) |
| Cleveland Subdivision | Valley City, Ohio | Cleveland, Ohio | Former B&O |
| Cleveland Terminal Subdivision | Collinwood, Ohio | Cleveland, Ohio | Former Conrail |
| Columbus Subdivision | Columbus, Ohio | Fostoria, Ohio | |
| Columbus Line Subdivision | Galion, Ohio | Columbus, Ohio | Former Conrail |
| Crawfordsville Branch Subdivision | Indianapolis, Indiana | Crawfordsville, Indiana | |
| Erie West Subdivision | Lake View, New York | Collinwood, Ohio | Includes the CSX Bridge in Painesville, Ohio |
| Fostoria Subdivision | Fostoria, Ohio | | Former C&O |
| Frankfort Secondary Subdivision | Indianapolis, Indiana | Frankfort, Indiana | Former PRR & Conrail |
| Greenwich Subdivision | Berea, Ohio | Martel, Ohio | |
| Indianapolis Belt Subdivision | Indianapolis, Indiana | | |
| Indianapolis Line Subdivision | Bellefontaine, Ohio | Indianapolis, Indiana | Former New York Central Ohio Division |
| Indianapolis Terminal Subdivision | Indianapolis, Indiana | | |
| Louisville Secondary Subdivision | Indianapolis, Indiana | | |
| Mount Victory Subdivision | Martel, Ohio | Bellefontaine, Ohio | |
| New Castle Subdivision | New Castle, Pennsylvania | Greenwich, Ohio | Former B&O |
| Newton Falls Subdivision | Newton Falls, Ohio | DeForest, Ohio | |
| St. Louis Line Subdivision | Indianapolis, Indiana | East St. Louis, Illinois | Former Conrail |
| Scottslawn Subdivision | Columbus, Ohio | Ridgeway, Ohio | |
| Shelbyville Secondary Subdivision | Indianapolis, Indiana | Shelbyville, Indiana | |
| Short Line Subdivision | Collinwood, Ohio | Berea, Ohio | Former NYC & Conrail |
| Toledo Branch Subdivision | Toledo, Ohio | Columbus, Ohio | |
| Willard Subdivision | Willard, Ohio | Deshler, Ohio | Former B&O |
| Willard Terminal Subdivision | Greenwich, Ohio | Willard, Ohio | |
==== Louisville Division ====
| Subdivision | From | To | Notes |
| Athens Subdivision | Columbus, Ohio | Groveport, Ohio | Former Columbus, Hocking Valley and Toledo Railway main line; later C&O |
| Big Sandy Subdivision | Elkhorn City, Kentucky | Catlettsburg, Kentucky | Former C&O |
| C&N Subdivision | Newark, Ohio | Columbus, Ohio | C&N = Columbus & Newark. Leased to Columbus and Ohio River Railroad (CUOH)) |
| CC Subdivision | Covington, Kentucky | Corbin, Kentucky | CC = Cincinnati Corbin |
| Central Ohio Subdivision | Newark, Ohio | Cambridge, Ohio | Now operated by the Columbus and Ohio River Railroad (CUOH) |
| Cincinnati Subdivision | South Shore, Kentucky | Silver Grove, Kentucky | |
| Cincinnati Terminal Subdivision | Silver Grove, Kentucky | Hamilton, Ohio | |
| Coal Run Subdivision | Pikeville, Kentucky | Kimper, Kentucky | |
| Corbin Terminal Subdivision | Corbin, Kentucky | Corbin, Kentucky | |
| CV Subdivision | Corbin, Kentucky | Big Stone Gap, Virginia | Former L&N CV = Cumberland Valley |
| E&BV Subdivision | Martin, Kentucky | Deane, Kentucky | Former C&O, originally Elkhorn & Beaver Valley Railway |
| EK Subdivision | Winchester, Kentucky | Hazard, Kentucky | EK = Eastern Kentucky |
| Hoosier Subdivision | New Albany, Indiana | Bedford, Indiana | MP 00Q245.8 (Bedford, end of track) to 00Q317.7 (VI tower); former Monon Railroad |
| Illinois Subdivision | Washington, Indiana | East St. Louis, Illinois | Former B&O |
| Indiana Subdivision | Cincinnati, Ohio | Washington, Indiana | Former B&O |
| Indianapolis Subdivision | Hamilton, Ohio | Indianapolis, Indiana | Former B&O |
| LCL Subdivision | Covington, Kentucky | Louisville, Kentucky | Former Louisville and Nashville Railroad (L&N) LCL = Louisville Cincinnati Line |
| LH&StL Subdivision | Louisville, Kentucky | Henderson, Kentucky | Former L&N LH&StL = Louisville, Henderson & St. Louis |
| Long Fork Subdivision | Martin, Kentucky | Martin, Kentucky | Former C&O |
| Louisville Terminal Subdivision | Louisville, Kentucky | Louisville, Kentucky | |
| Main Line Subdivision | Louisville, Kentucky | Nashville, Tennessee | Former L&N Main Line (from which that line took its name) |
| Middletown Subdivision | New Miami, Ohio | Middletown, Ohio | |
| Midland Subdivision | St. Bernard, Ohio | Columbus, Ohio | Now operated by Indiana & Ohio Railway (IORY)) |
| Northern Subdivision | Greenup, Kentucky | Columbus, Ohio | |
| Old Road Subdivision | Anchorage, Kentucky | Winchester, Kentucky | Now operated by RJ Corman Railroad (RJCC) |
| Richmond Subdivision | Fernald, Ohio | Richmond, Indiana | Now operated by Indiana Eastern Railroad (IERR) |
| Rockhouse Subdivision | Hazard, Kentucky | Deane, Kentucky | |
| Russell Subdivision | Russell, Kentucky | Greenup, Kentucky | Terminal subdivision incorporating Russell Yard and Raceland Car Shops |
| SV&E Subdivision | Shelbiana, Kentucky | Dorton, Kentucky | SV&E = Sandy Valley & Eastern |
| Toledo Subdivision | Hamilton, Ohio | Perrysburg, Ohio | MP BE25.8 (Butler Street) to BE193.6 (Perrysburg). Former B&O |
=== CSX Southern Region === ==== Atlanta Division ====
| Subdivision | From | To | Notes |
| A&WP Subdivision | Union City, Georgia | Montgomery, Alabama | A&WP = Atlanta & West Point |
| Abbeville Subdivision | Abbeville, South Carolina | Tucker, Georgia | Ex-Seaboard Air Line, from Tucker, Georgia, to Abbeville, South Carolina. |
| Atlanta Terminal Subdivision | Elizabeth, Georgia | Lithonia, Georgia | Includes Tilford and Hulsey yards; Connects to W&A Sub at Elizabeth and Georgia Sub at Lithonia |
| | Atlanta, Georgia | Peachtree City, Georgia | Starts at Tilford Yard; Connects to Manchester Sub at Peachtree City |
| | Atlanta, Georgia | Cartersville, Georgia | Starts at Tilford Yard; Connects thru Marietta, Georgia |
| | Atlanta, Georgia | Union City, Georgia | Connects to A&WP Sub at Union City |
| | Hulsey Yard | Decatur, Georgia | Also known as the Inman Park Belt Line; Connects Georgia Sub to Abbeville Sub at Decatur |
| Birmingham Mineral Subdivision | Birmingham, Alabama | Brookwood, Alabama | |
| Boyles Terminal Subdivision | New Castle, Alabama | Hoover, Alabama | |
| Camak Subdivision | Camak, Georgia | Milledgeville, Georgia | Milledgeville is end of track |
| Cartersville Subdivision | Cartersville, Georgia | Cedartown, Georgia | Ex-Seaboard Air Line, (Seaboard Coast Line after July 1, 1967 SAL-ACL merger); Cedartown is end of track |
| Etowah Subdivision | Etowah, Tennessee | Cartersville, Georgia | Ex-L&N Railroad |
| Gainesville Midland Subdivision | Athens, Georgia | Gainesville, Georgia | Connects CSX Abbeville Sub with Norfolk Southern Piedmont Division, Greenville District |
| Georgia Subdivision | Grovetown, Georgia | Lithonia, Georgia | |
| KD Subdivision | Corbin, Kentucky | Etowah, Tennessee | |
| Lineville Subdivision | Bessemer, Alabama | Manchester, Georgia | |
| M&M Subdivision | Montgomery, Alabama | Mobile, Alabama | M&M = Mobile & Montgomery |
| Manchester Subdivision | Peachtree City, Georgia | Manchester, Georgia | |
| NO&M Subdivision | Mobile, Alabama | New Orleans, Louisiana | NO&M = New Orleans & Mobile |
| PD Subdivision | Pensacola, Florida | Flomaton, Alabama | |
| S&NA South Subdivision | Birmingham, Alabama | Montgomery, Alabama | S&NA = South & North Alabama |
| W&A Subdivision | Chattanooga, Tennessee | Elizabeth, Georgia | Owned by the state of Georgia, leased to CSX for 99 years. Former L&N W&A = Western & Atlantic |
==== Florence Division ====
| Subdivision | From | To | Notes |
| Aberdeen Subdivision | Raleigh, North Carolina | Marston, North Carolina | Former Seaboard Air Line main line to Richmond, Va. Abandon north of Norlina, N.C. in 1987. |
| Alleghany Subdivision | Clifton Forge, Virginia | Hinton, West Virginia | |
| Andrews Subdivision | Hamlet, North Carolina | Charleston, South Carolina | |
| Augusta Subdivision | Augusta, Georgia | Yemassee, South Carolina | Originally the Port Royal and Augusta Railway |
| Bellwood Subdivision | Richmond, Virginia | Bellwood, Virginia | Mostly part of the S Line |
| Belton Subdivision | Spartanburg, South Carolina | Williamston, South Carolina | |
| Big Coal Subdivision | Whitesville, West Virginia | Sproul, West Virginia | |
| Big Marsh Fork Subdivision | Whitesville, West Virginia | Sundial, West Virginia | |
| Blue Ridge Subdivision | Erwin, Tennessee | Spartanburg, South Carolina | Part of the former Clinchfield Railroad |
| Buffalo Subdivision | Man, West Virginia | Lorado, West Virginia | |
| Cabin Creek Subdivision | Cabin Creek, West Virginia | Red Warrior, West Virginia | |
| Charleston Subdivision | Florence, South Carolina | Savannah, Georgia | Part of the A Line |
| Charlotte Subdivision | Monroe, North Carolina | Bostic, North Carolina | |
| CN&L Subdivision | Laurens, South Carolina | Columbia, South Carolina | CN&L = Columbia, Newberry & Laurens |
| Coal River Subdivision | Sharples, West Virginia | St. Albans, West Virginia | |
| Columbia Subdivision | Columbia, South Carolina | Savannah, Georgia | Part of the S Line |
| Creston Subdivision | Elloree, South Carolina | St. George, South Carolina | |
| Cross Subdivision | St. Stephen, South Carolina | Cross, South Carolina | |
| Eastover Subdivision | Sumter, South Carolina | Columbia, South Carolina | |
| Erwin Terminal Subdivision | Erwin, Tennessee | Erwin, Tennessee | Terminal closed 2015 |
| G&E Subdivision | Charmco, West Virginia | Quinwood, West Virginia | |
| Gauley Subdivision | Gauley Bridge, West Virginia | Fola, West Virginia | |
| Georgetown Subdivision | Georgetown, South Carolina | Andrews, South Carolina | |
| Hamlet Subdivision | Hamlet, North Carolina | Columbia, South Carolina | Part of the S Line |
| Hamlet Terminal Subdivision | Marston, North Carolina | Hamlet, North Carolina | Includes the S Line, SF Line & SH Line |
| Hopewell Subdivision | Bellwood, Virginia | Hopewell, Virginia | |
| Island Creek Subdivision | Logan, West Virginia | Scarlet, West Virginia | |
| James River Subdivision | Gladstone, Virginia | Clifton Forge, Virginia | |
| Jarrolds Valley Subdivision | Whitesville, West Virginia | Clear Creek, West Virginia | |
| Kanawha Subdivision | Montgomery, West Virginia | Russell, Kentucky | |
| Kingsport Subdivision | Elkhorn City, Kentucky | Erwin, Tennessee | Part of the former Clinchfield Railroad |
| Lane Subdivision | Lane, South Carolina | Sumter, South Carolina | |
| Laurel Fork Subdivision | Clothier, West Virginia | Hampton #3 Mine, West Virginia | |
| Logan Subdivision | Barboursville, West Virginia | Gilbert, West Virginia | |
| Logan and Southern Subdivision | Logan, West Virginia | Sarah Ann, West Virginia | |
| McCormick Subdivision | Augusta, Georgia | Greenwood, South Carolina | Former Seaboard System, split off by CSX from Spartanburg Sub. |
| Middle Creek Subdivision | Prestonsburg, Kentucky | David, Kentucky | Former C&O |
| Monroe Subdivision | Hamlet, North Carolina | Abbeville, South Carolina | |
| New River Subdivision | Hinton, West Virginia | Montgomery, West Virginia | |
| Norlina Subdivision | Norlina, North Carolina | Raleigh, North Carolina | Part of the S Line |
| North End Subdivision | Richmond, Virginia | Rocky Mount, North Carolina | Part of the A Line |
| Orangeburg Subdivision | Sumter, South Carolina | Cope, South Carolina | Former ACL, originally part of the Manchester and Augusta Railroad |
| Parmele Subdivision | Parmele, North Carolina | Kinston, North Carolina | |
| Peninsula Subdivision | Newport News, Virginia | Richmond, Virginia | Former Chesapeake and Ohio Railway (C&O), End of the Line |
| Pine Creek Subdivision | Omar, West Virginia | Hobet #7 Mine Omar, West Virginia | |
| Piney Creek Subdivision | Prince, West Virginia | Glen Daniel, West Virginia | |
| Pond Fork Subdivision | Danville, West Virginia | Wharton, West Virginia | |
| Portsmouth Subdivision | Portsmouth, Virginia | Weldon, North Carolina | Part of the S Line |
| Raleigh Southwestern and Winding Gulf Subdivision | Raleigh, West Virginia | Pemberton, West Virginia | |
| Richmond Terminal Subdivision | Richmond, Virginia | | |
| Rivanna Subdivision | Richmond, Virginia | Gladstone, Virginia | |
| Rupert Subdivision | Rainelle, West Virginia | Clearco, West Virginia | |
| Seth Subdivision | Seth, West Virginia | Prenter, West Virginia | |
| Sewell Valley Subdivision | Meadow Creek, West Virginia | Nallen, West Virginia | |
| South End Subdivision | Rocky Mount, North Carolina | Florence, South Carolina | Part of the A Line |
| Spartanburg Subdivision | Spartanburg, South Carolina | Greenwood, South Carolina | |
| Tarboro Subdivision | Rocky Mount, North Carolina | Plymouth, North Carolina | |
| Terrell Subdivision | Mount Holly, North Carolina | Terrell, North Carolina | Former Piedmont & Northern, Acquired by SCL July 1, 1969. |
| W&W Subdivision | Wilson, North Carolina | Wallace, North Carolina | W&W = Wilson & Wallace |
| West Fork Subdivision | Van, West Virginia | Twilight, West Virginia | |
| Wilmington Subdivision | Hamlet, North Carolina | Wilmington, North Carolina | |
| Winston-Salem Southbound Railway | Winston-Salem, North Carolina | Wadesboro, North Carolina | |
==== Jacksonville Division ====
| Subdivision | From | To | Notes |
| Achan Subdivision | Mulberry, Florida | Bradley, Florida | Former Charlotte Harbor and Northern Railway |
| Agricola Spur | Bradley, Florida | Agricola, Florida | |
| Auburndale Subdivision | Auburndale, Florida | Mangonia Park, Florida | |
| Bainbridge Subdivision | Tallahassee, Florida | Bainbridge, Georgia | The segment from Bainbridge to Attapulgus, Georgia, was sold to the Florida Gulf & Atlantic Railroad on June 1, 2019. CSX retains trackage rights into Tallahassee. |
| Bone Valley Subdivision | Mulberry, Florida | Agricola, Florida | |
| Brewster Subdivision | Edison, Florida | Arcadia, Florida | Former Charlotte Harbor and Northern Railway |
| Brooker Subdivision | Starke, Florida | Newberry, Florida | |
| Brooksville Subdivision | Brooksville, Florida | Sulphur Springs, Florida | Former Tampa Northern Railroad |
| Brunswick Subdivision | Waycross, Georgia | Brunswick, Georgia | |
| Callahan Subdivision | Callahan, Florida | Baldwin, Florida | |
| Carters Subdivision | Poinciana, Florida | Lakeland, Florida | Part of the A Line. Former South Florida Railroad |
| CH Subdivision | Lakeland, Florida | Eaton Park, Florida | Originally the Charlotte Harbor Division of the South Florida Railroad |
| Clearwater Subdivision | Gary, Florida | St. Petersburg, Florida | |
| Deerhaven Subdivision | Alachua, Florida | Gainesville, Florida | |
| Dothan Subdivision | Montgomery, Alabama | Thomasville, Georgia | Former Seaboard System |
| Fitzgerald Subdivision | Manchester, Georgia | Waycross, Georgia | This is CSX's main line coming in from the Midwest into Florida. |
| Homestead Subdivision | Hialeah, Florida | Homestead, Florida | Homestead is end of track, the southernmost point on the CSX network |
| Jacksonville Terminal Subdivision | Jacksonville, Florida | Baldwin, Florida | Part of the S Line |
| Jacksonville Terminal Subdivision | Dinsmore, Florida | St. Johns, Florida | Part of the A Line |
| Jesup Subdivision | Jesup, Georgia | Folkston, Georgia | |
| Kingsland Subdivision | Jacksonville, Florida | Yulee, Florida | |
| Lakeland Subdivision | Lakeland, Florida | Mango, Florida | This is for the first section that is part of the A Line. The second section runs from Winston, FL to Mulberry, FL. Former South Florida Railroad |
| Miami Subdivision | Delta, Florida | Hialeah, Florida | Former subdivision Line is now South Florida Rail Corridor. |
| Nahunta Subdivision | Richmond Hill, Georgia | Dinsmore, Florida | Part of the A Line |
| P&A Subdivision | Chattahoochee, Florida | Pensacola, Florida | Former subdivision, named for the Pensacola and Atlantic Railroad, which was merged into the L&N in 1891. Sold to the Florida Gulf & Atlantic Railroad on June 1, 2019. CSX retains trackage rights. |
| Palmetto Subdivision | East Tampa, Florida | Oneco, Florida | |
| Plant City Subdivision | Plant City, Florida | Welcome, Florida | |
| Sanford Subdivision | St. Johns, Florida | Deland, Florida | Part of the A Line. Previously continued to Auburndale with former segment now the Central Florida Rail Corridor and Carters Subdivision. Former Jacksonville, Tampa and Key West Railway |
| Savannah Subdivision | Savannah, Georgia | | |
| Tallahassee Subdivision | Baldwin, Florida | Chattahoochee, Florida | Former subdivision, sold to the Florida Gulf & Atlantic Railroad on June 1, 2019. CSX retains trackage rights. |
| Tampa Terminal Subdivision | Tampa, Florida | | |
| Thomasville Subdivision | Thomasville, Georgia | Waycross, Georgia | |
| Valrico Subdivision | Valrico, Florida | Bowling Green, Florida | |
| Vitis Subdivision | Zephyrhills, Florida | Lakeland, Florida | |
| Wildwood Subdivision | Baldwin, Florida | Zephyrhills, Florida | Part of the S Line. Former ACL line from Zephyrhills to Trilacoochee, and former SAL line from Trilacoochee to Baldwin. |
| Yeoman Subdivision | Zephyrhills, Florida | Tampa, Florida | Part of the S Line. Former SAL line from Valrico to Zephyrhills, and former ACL line from Zephyrhills to Richland. |
==== Nashville Division ====
| Subdivision | From | To | Notes |
| Bruceton Subdivision | Nashville, Tennessee | Camden, Tennessee | |
| CE&D Subdivision | Perrysville, Indiana | Evansville, Indiana | |
| Chattanooga Subdivision | Nashville, Tennessee | Chattanooga, Tennessee | |
| Evansville Terminal Subdivision | Evansville, Indiana | | |
| Henderson Subdivision | Evansville, Indiana | Nashville, Tennessee | |
| Memphis Subdivision | Bruceton, Tennessee | Memphis, Tennessee | Former Louisville and Nashville Railroad (L&N) |
| Memphis Terminal Subdivision | Memphis, Tennessee | | |
| Nashville Subdivision | Brentwood, Tennessee | Columbia, Tennessee | Columbia is end of track/beginning of TSRR |
| Nashville Terminal Subdivision | Nashville, Tennessee | | |
| O&N Subdivision | Drakesboro, Kentucky | Island, Kentucky | O&N = Owensboro & Nashville |
| S&NA North Subdivision | Brentwood, Tennessee | Fultondale, Alabama | S&NA = South & North Alabama |
| St. Louis Subdivision | Evansville, Indiana | Okawville, Illinois | Leased to the Evansville Western Railway |

== Former lines ==
=== Northern Region === ==== Albany Division ====
| Subdivision | From | To | Reason |
|---|---|---|---|
| Fall River Subdivision | Myricks, Massachusetts | Fall River, Massachusetts | Sold ownership to Massachusetts Bay Transportation Authority and freight operating rights to Massachusetts Coastal Railroad in 2010. |
| Fitchburg Subdivision | Leominster, Massachusetts | Framingham, Massachusetts | Realigned to Boston Subdivision as Fitchburg Branch, No longer a main line track now controlled by Framingham Yardmaster. |
| Framingham Subdivision | Mansfield, Massachusetts | Framingham, Massachusetts | Sold ownership to Massachusetts Bay Transportation Authority and partial freight operating rights to Massachusetts Coastal Railroad. |
| Hudson Subdivision | Hoffmans, New York | Poughkeepsie, New York | Leased to Amtrak December 2012 |
| Lake Shore Subdivision | Erie, Pennsylvania | Buffalo, New York | As of 2010.03.15 the Lake Shore subdivision has been moved from the Albany to the Great Lakes division IH desk, and the NH desk has been abolished. Merged into Erie West Subdivision. |
| Middleboro Subdivision | Attleboro, Massachusetts | Taunton, Massachusetts | Sold ownership to Massachusetts Bay Transportation Authority and partial freight operating rights to Massachusetts Coastal Railroad. |
| New Bedford Subdivision | Weir Village, Massachusetts | New Bedford, Massachusetts | Sold ownership to Massachusetts Bay Transportation Authority and freight operating rights to Massachusetts Coastal Railroad in 2010. |
| Post Road Subdivision | Castleton-on-Hudson, New York | Rensselaer, New York | Leased to Amtrak December 2012 |
| Schodack Subdivision | Stuyvesant, New York | Schodack, New York | Realigned and merged with Castleton Subdivision. |
| Somerset Railroad Subdivision | Somerset, New York | Lockport, New York | CSX discontinued and ceased operations on December 8, 2021 |
==== Baltimore Division ====
| Subdivision | From | To | Notes |
| Bergen Subdivision | North Bergen, New Jersey | Bogota, New Jersey | MP QR2.1 to QR7.5 connected Conrail Shared Assets to River Sub. Became part of River Sub in 2008. |
==== Chicago Division ====
| Subdivision | From | To | Notes |
==== Great Lakes Division ====
| Subdivision | From | To | Notes |
==== Louisville Division ====
| Subdivision | From | To | Notes |
=== Southern Region === ==== Atlanta Division ====
| Subdivision | From | To | Notes |
==== Florence Division ====
| Subdivision | From | To | Notes |
| Piedmont Subdivision | Richmond, VA | Gordonsville, VA | Ex C&O Trackage. |
| North Mountain Subdivision | Orange, VA | Clifton Forge, VA | Ex C&O Trackage. |
==== Monongah Division ====
| Subdivision | From | To | Notes |
| Parkersburg Subdivision | Grafton, WV | Belpre, OH | Tracks torn out 1985. Division reorganized. |
| M.R. Subdivision | Clarksburg, WV | Haywood, WV | Tracks torn out. |
| W.Va.&P Subdivision | Clarksburg, WV | Weston, WV | Tracks torn out. |
==== Nashville Division ====
| Subdivision | From | To | Notes |
| Danville Secondary Subdivision | Terre Haute, Indiana | Olivet, Illinois | Sold to Watco in Sep. 2018. Now operated by the Decatur & Eastern Illinois Railroad. |
| Decatur Subdivision | Hillsdale, Indiana | Decatur, Illinois | Sold to Watco in Sep. 2018. Now operated by the Decatur & Eastern Illinois Railroad. |
| Selma Subdivision | Montgomery, Alabama | Selma, Alabama | |
==== Huntington Division ====
| Subdivision | From | To | Notes |
| Cowen Subdivision | Grafton, West Virginia | Cowen, West Virginia | Leased to Appalachian & Ohio |
| Pickens Subdivision | Hampton, West Virginia | Alexander, West Virginia | Leased to Appalachian & Ohio |
==== Appalachian Division ====
| Subdivision | From | To | Notes |

== See also ==
- List of Norfolk Southern Railway lines
