= Albany Division =

Railway division of CSX Transportation

The Albany Division is a railroad division operated by CSX Transportation in the U.S. states of Massachusetts, New Jersey, New York and Pennsylvania. The Albany Division comprises 28 subdivisions. It includes connections to other railroads.

== Subdivisions list ==
The subdivisions within the Albany Division are as follows:

- Baldwinsville Subdivision
- Belt Subdivision
- Berkshire Subdivision
- Boston Subdivision
- Buffalo Terminal Subdivision
- Carman Subdivision
- Castleton Subdivision
- Fair Grounds Subdivision
- Fitchburg Subdivision
- Framingham Subdivision
- Fulton Subdivision
- Hudson Subdivision
- Lockport Subdivision
- Middleboro Subdivision
- Mohawk Subdivision
- Montreal Subdivision
- Niagara Subdivision
- Port Subdivision
- Post Road Subdivision
- River Subdivision
- Rochester Subdivision
- St. Lawrence Subdivision
- Schodack Subdivision
- Selkirk Subdivision
- Somerset Railroad Subdivision
- Syracuse Terminal Subdivision
- Trenton Subdivision
- West Shore Subdivision

== See also ==
- List of CSX Transportation lines
