= Nashville Division =

Railway division of CSX Transportation

The Nashville Division is a railroad division operated by CSX Transportation in the U.S. states of Alabama, Georgia, Kentucky, Illinois, Indiana, and Tennessee. The Nashville Division has fourteen subdivisions.

The subdivisions within the Nashville Division are as follows:

- Bruceton Subdivision
- CE&D Subdivision
- Chattanooga Subdivision
- Danville Secondary Subdivision
- Decatur Subdivision
- Evansville Terminal Subdivision
- Henderson Subdivision
- Memphis Subdivision
- Memphis Terminal Subdivision
- Nashville Subdivision
- Nashville Terminal Subdivision
- O&N Subdivision
- S&NA North Subdivision
- St. Louis Subdivision (Leased to EVWR)

== See also ==
- List of CSX Transportation lines
