= Atlanta Division =

Railway division of CSX Transportation

The Atlanta Division is a railroad division operated by CSX Transportation in the U.S. states of Alabama, Georgia, Kentucky, Louisiana, Mississippi, South Carolina, Florida & Tennessee. The Atlanta Division has 18 subdivisions.

The subdivisions within the Atlanta Division are as follows:

- Atlanta Terminal Subdivision
- Abbeville Subdivision
- A&WP Subdivision
- Birmingham Mineral Subdivision
- Boyles Terminal Subdivision
- Camak Subdivision
- Cartersville Subdivision
- Etowah Subdivision
- Georgia Subdivision
- Gainesville Midland Subdivision
- KD Subdivision
- Lineville Subdivision
- M&M Subdivision
- Manchester Subdivision
- NO&M Subdivision
- PD Subdivision
- S&NA South Subdivision
- W&A Subdivision

== See also ==
- List of CSX Transportation lines
