= LH&StL Subdivision =

Railway line in Kentucky

The LH&STL Subdivision is a railroad line owned by CSX Transportation in the U.S. state of Kentucky. It was originally built as the Louisville, Henderson and Texas Railway in 1882, with the intent of building a line to Texas by way of St. Louis, Missouri. It was nicknamed "The Texas Line," by which it is still often referred today. The line fell into bankruptcy and was reorganized as the Louisville, Henderson and St. Louis Railway in 1896. The rail line was acquired by the Louisville and Nashville Railroad in 1929; the parent company still exists and holds other rail-related assets. Through a series of mergers, the line is now operated by CSX.

The line runs from Louisville, Kentucky, to Henderson, Kentucky, for a total of 136.5 miles (219.7 km). At its east end the line continues west from the Louisville Terminal Subdivision, and at its west end the line continues west as the Henderson Subdivision of the Nashville Division.

== See also ==
- List of CSX Transportation lines
