= Terminal Railway of Buffalo =

Overview
- Locale: southeast of Buffalo, New York
- Dates of operation: 1898–1914

Technical
- Track gauge: 4 ft 8 1/2 in (1,435 mm) standard gauge

The Terminal Railway of Buffalo was a part of the New York Central Railroad system southeast of Buffalo, New York. It built the Gardenville Branch or Gardenville Cutoff, allowing through trains to bypass Buffalo. The cutoff has since been abandoned in favor of other parallel lines.

== History ==
The Terminal Railway was chartered on June 12, 1895 to connect the New York Central Railroad main line at Depew (42.9087°N 78.7146°W) southwest through Gardenville to the NYC's Lake Shore and Michigan Southern Railway at Lackawanna (42.8043°N 78.8344°W). The line, intended to ease congestion in Buffalo, opened on September 20, 1898.

When originally built, the southwest end only provided direct access only towards Buffalo, merging with the Lake Shore and Michigan Southern at the West Seneca Yard. A connection was soon built allowing for through traffic between New York City and Chicago without turning at the yard. A connection was also built, in or soon after 1923, from the northeast end at Depew north to the New York Central's West Shore Railroad (42.9325°N 78.7191°W). This allowed trains on the West Shore, which paralleled the NYC main line, to also use the cutoff.

The Terminal Railway was merged into the New York Central Railroad on December 22, 1914.

The line passed into the hands of Penn Central in 1968 and Conrail in 1976. By 1995 the line was gone south of the Pennsylvania Railroad (Western New York and Pennsylvania Railway) crossing at Ebenezer (42.8492°N 78.7706°W), abandoned in favor of the PRR's West Seneca Branch and the Lehigh Valley Railroad's Lehigh and Lake Erie Railroad. North of Ebenezer the branch continued to serve local traffic from a connection with the old PRR line to the NYC lines at Depew, but that has been cut back to a short section near Ebenezer. The 1998 breakup of Conrail assigned the remaining section to Pennsylvania Lines LLC, a subsidiary of Norfolk Southern.

The connection to the West Shore at Depew is now owned by New York Central Lines LLC, a CSX subsidiary, and is used to move trains between the old NYC main and West Shore lines.

== See also ==
- Junction Railroad, which built the NYC's Buffalo Belt Line northeast of downtown
- Lehigh and Lake Erie Railroad, a parallel cutoff built by the Lehigh Valley Railroad
- West Seneca Branch, a parallel cutoff built by the Pennsylvania Railroad
