= Rupert Subdivision =

Railroad line in West Virginia, United States

The Rupert Subdivision is a railroad line owned by CSX Transportation in the U.S. state of West Virginia. It was formerly part of the CSX Huntington East Division. It became part of the CSX Florence Division on June 20, 2016. The line runs from Rainelle, West Virginia, to Clearco, West Virginia, for a total of 20.8 miles (33.5 km). At its west end the track wye's off of the Sewell Valley Subdivision and at its east end the track comes to an end.

== See also ==
- List of CSX Transportation lines
