= MQT =

MQT may refer to:

- Sawyer International Airport's IATA code
- Marquette Rail's reporting mark
