= Old Road =

Old Road may refer to:

- Old Road, Antigua and Barbuda, a town on Antigua island, Antigua and Barbuda
- Old Road, Oxford, a road in Oxford and Oxfordshire, England
- The Old Road, an alternative name for U.S. Route 99, United States
- Old Road Campus, a University of Oxford site in Oxford, England
- Old Road F.C., Antiguan football team in the Antigua and Barbuda Premier Division
- Old Road Ground, former cricket, football, and greyhound racing stadium in Clacton-on-Sea, Essex, England
- Old Road Subdivision, railroad line in Kentucky, United States
- Old Road Town, a town in Saint Kitts and Nevis

== See also ==
- This Old Road, a 2006 album by Kris Kristofferson
- Old Street, a street in London, England
- "Old Town Road", a 2018 song by Lil Nas X
