= Blue Ridge Subdivision =

Railway line in the United States of America

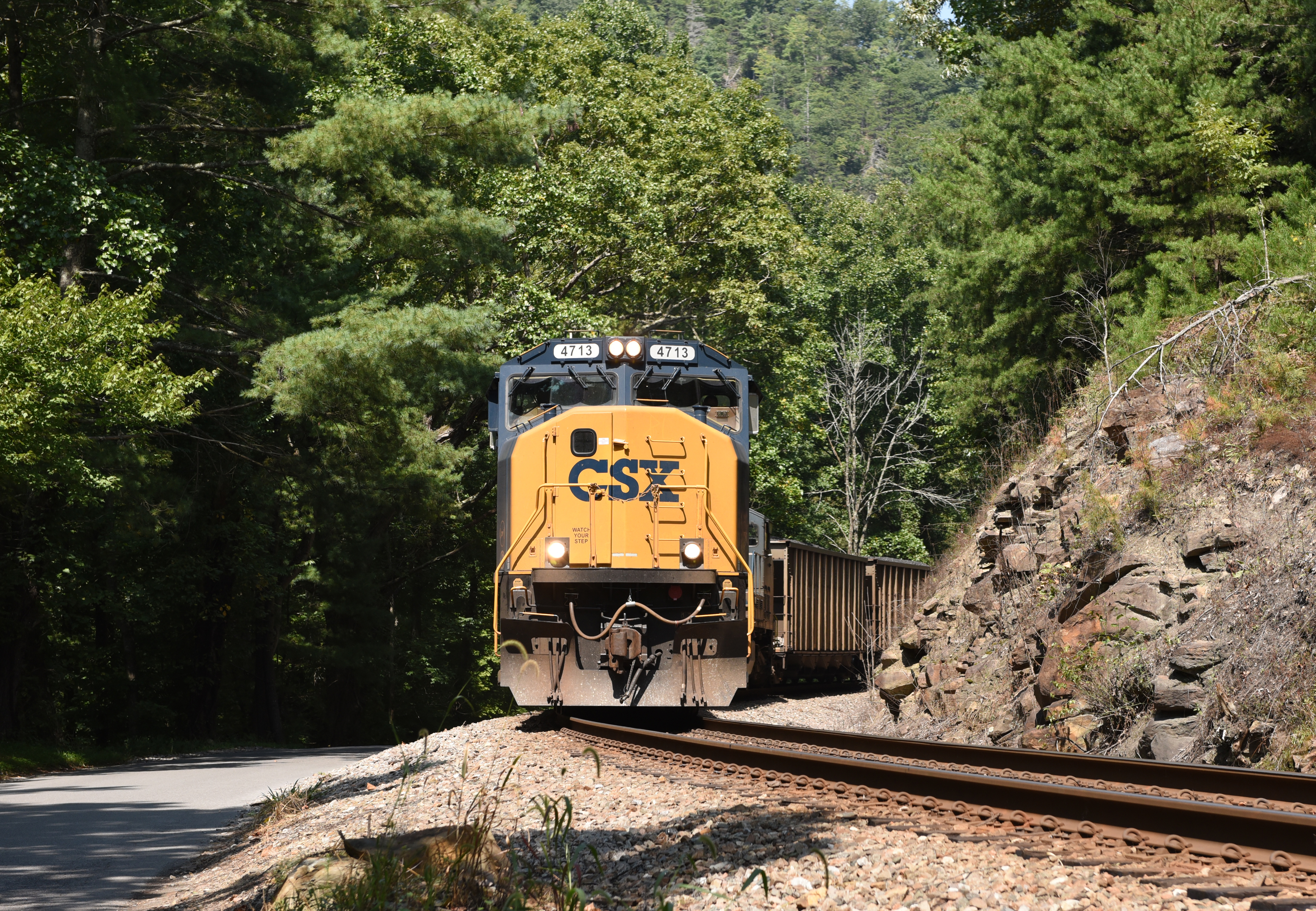
A CSX freight train in Unaka Springs, TN, on the Blue Ridge subdivision

The Blue Ridge Subdivision is a railroad line owned by CSX Transportation in the U.S. states of Tennessee, North Carolina, and South Carolina. It was formerly part of the CSX Huntington West Division. It became part of the CSX Florence Division on June 20, 2016. The line was originally owned by Clinchfield Railroad, and runs from Erwin, Tennessee, to Spartanburg, South Carolina, for a total of 138.6 miles (223.1 km). At its north end it continues south from the Erwin Terminal Subdivision and at its south end it branches off onto the Belton Subdivision and the Spartanburg Subdivision. Approximately 14 million tons of freight were carried over the subdivision each year as of 2024. About 5 to 7 trains used the subdivision per day as of 2024, including four daily merchandise trains, coal trains serving utility customers, ethanol trains heading towards the Charlotte, North Carolina area, and sporadic grain trains.

Much of the line in Tennessee and North Carolina was destroyed by Hurricane Helene in September 2024. A year of reconstruction work commenced afterwards; the line re-opened in September 2025.

== See also ==
- List of CSX Transportation lines
