= Lineville Subdivision =

Railway line in Georgia and Alabama

The Lineville Subdivision is a railroad line currently operated by CSX Transportation in Georgia and Alabama. It runs from Parkwood (a suburb of Birmingham, Alabama) southeast though Lineville, Alabama to Manchester, Georgia, a distance of 179.4 miles (288.7 km). It connects with CSX's Manchester Subdivision and Fitzgerald Subdivision in Manchester.

== History ==
The Lineville Subdivision was complete in 1908 by the Atlanta, Birmingham and Atlantic Railway (AB&A). In 1926, the AB&A went into receivership and the Atlantic Coast Line Railroad (ACL) purchased a majority stock in the AB&A. The Atlantic Coast Line reorganized the AB&A as the Atlanta, Birmingham and Coast Railroad (AB&C) and continued to operate it as a separate company. The Atlanta, Birmingham and Coast Railroad operated passenger service on the line from Birmingham, which continued south on the AB&C network to Waycross, Brunswick, and Thomasville.

In 1946, the Atlantic Coast Line fully absorbed the AB&C and it became their Western Division. The Atlantic Coast Line became the Seaboard Coast Line Railroad (SCL) in 1967 after merging with their rival, the Seaboard Air Line Railroad (SAL). The Seaboard Coast Line adopted the Seaboard Air Line's method of naming their lines as subdivisions which resulted in the from Manchester to Parkwood being named the Lineville Subdivision. The former AB&C/ACL track beyond Parkwood to Birmingham was designated as the Elyton Subdivision. The Elyton Subdivision was abandoned in 1988 and the Lineville Subdivision now merges with the S&NA South Subdivision (a former Louisville and Nashville Railroad line) at Parkwood. An overpass that once carried the former Elyton Subdivision over Carolina Avenue in Bessemer still stands abandoned today.

In 1980, the Seaboard Coast Line's parent company merged with the Chessie System, creating the CSX Corporation. The CSX Corporation initially operated the Chessie and Seaboard Systems separately until 1986, when they were merged into CSX Transportation, who operates the Lineville Subdivision today. A short segment of the Lineville Subdivision has been abandoned in LaGrange, which has been consolidated with the A&WP Subdivision.

== Historic stations ==
Manchester to Birmingham
State	Milepost	City/Location	Station	Connections and notes
GA	ANJ 788.1	Manchester	Manchester	
GA	ANJ 793.3	Warm Springs	Warm Springs	originally Bullochville junction with Georgia Midland and Gulf Railroad (SOU)
GA	ANJ 797.1		Camp Ground	
GA	ANJ 799.7		Durand	junction with Savannah and Western Railroad (CoG)
GA	ANJ 800.6		Carlsbad	
GA	ANJ 805.0		Stovall	
GA	ANJ 809.5		Big Springs	
GA	ANJ 812.0		Knott	
GA	ANJ 818.2	LaGrange	LaGrange	junction with Atlanta and West Point Railroad
GA	ANJ 825.3		Pyne	
GA	ANJ 828.7		Abbottsford	
AL	ANJ 834.2		Standing Rock	junction with Chattahoochee Valley Railway
AL	ANJ 837.1		Cedric	
AL	ANJ 843.1	Roanoke	Roanoke	junction with East Alabama and Cincinnati Railway (CoG)
AL	ANJ 847.7		Peavy	
AL	ANJ 849.7		Dickert	
AL	ANJ 852.3		Blake	
AL	ANJ 853.4		Abanda	
AL	ANJ 857.2	Wadley	Wadley	
AL	ANJ 863.8		Malone	
AL	ANJ 872.1		Cragford	
AL	ANJ 873.2		Berwick	
AL	ANJ 881.6	Lineville	Lineville	
AL	ANJ 886.6		Highland	
AL	ANJ 888.0		Pyriton	
AL	ANJ 892.2		Erin	
AL	ANJ 893.7		Clairmont Springs	
AL	ANJ 895.8		Weathers	
AL	ANJ 897.5		Chandler	
AL	ANJ 902.8	Waldo	Waldo	
AL	ANJ 904.3		Carara	
AL	ANJ 905.8		Stockdale	
AL	ANJ 908.4	Talladega	Bama Junction	junction with Anniston and Atlantic Railroad (L&N)
AL	ANJ 910.2	Talladega	Talladega	junction with Alabama and Tennessee River Railroad (CoG)
AL	ANJ 913.1		Shocco	
AL	ANJ 919.5		St. Ives	
AL	ANJ 924.0		Grasmere	
AL	ANJ 926.0		Coosa Pines	
AL	ANJ 929.7		Arkwright	
AL	ANJ 932.0	Harpersville	Harpersville	
AL	ANJ 939.2	Westover	Westover	
AL	ANJ 945.1	Chelsea	Chelsea	
AL	ANJ 947.8		Scotia	
AL	ANJ 949.0		Watkins	
AL	ANJ 955.1		Deerhurst	
AL	ANJ 959.6	Pelham	Pelham	
AL	ANJ 961.7	Helena	Helena	junction with South and North Alabama Railroad (L&N)
AL	ANJ 967.4		Parkwood	
AL	ANJ 971.2		Purser	
AL	ANJ 974.3	Bessemer	Bessemer	
AL	ANJ 974.6	Bessemer	Bessemer Yard	
AL	ANJ 984.0	Birmingham	Elyton	
AL	ANJ 985.9	Birmingham	Birmingham	

== See also ==
- List of CSX Transportation lines
- Atlanta, Birmingham and Atlantic Railroad
