= Sewell Valley Subdivision =

Railway line in West Virginia

The Sewell Valley Subdivision is a railroad line owned by CSX Transportation in the U.S. state of West Virginia. It was formerly part of the CSX Huntington East Division. It became part of the CSX Florence Division on June 20, 2016.

The line runs from Meadow Creek, West Virginia, to Nallen, West Virginia, for a total of 43.6 miles (70.2 km). At its south end the line wye's off of the New River Subdivision and at its north end the track comes to an end. The line has junctions with the Rupert Subdivision and the G&E Subdivision.

== See also ==
- List of CSX Transportation lines
