= Central Ohio Subdivision =

Overview
- Other name(s): Cambridge Subdivision
- Owner: CUOH
- Locale: Ohio, USA
- Termini: Newark, Ohio; Cambridge, Ohio

Service
- Operator(s): Columbus and Ohio River Railroad

Technical
- Line length: 54.41 mi (87.56 km)
- Track gauge: 4 ft 8 1/2 in (1,435 mm) standard gauge

The Central Ohio Subdivision is owned by CSX Transportation and operated by Columbus and Ohio River Railroad in the U.S. State of Ohio. The line runs from Newark to Cambridge for a total of 54.41 miles (87.56 km). At its west end the line continues east from the Columbus and Ohio River Railroad C&N Subdivision and at its east end the line comes to an end.

== See also ==
- List of CSX Transportation lines
