= Ohio and Mississippi Railway =

Railway in Ohio and Illinois

Map

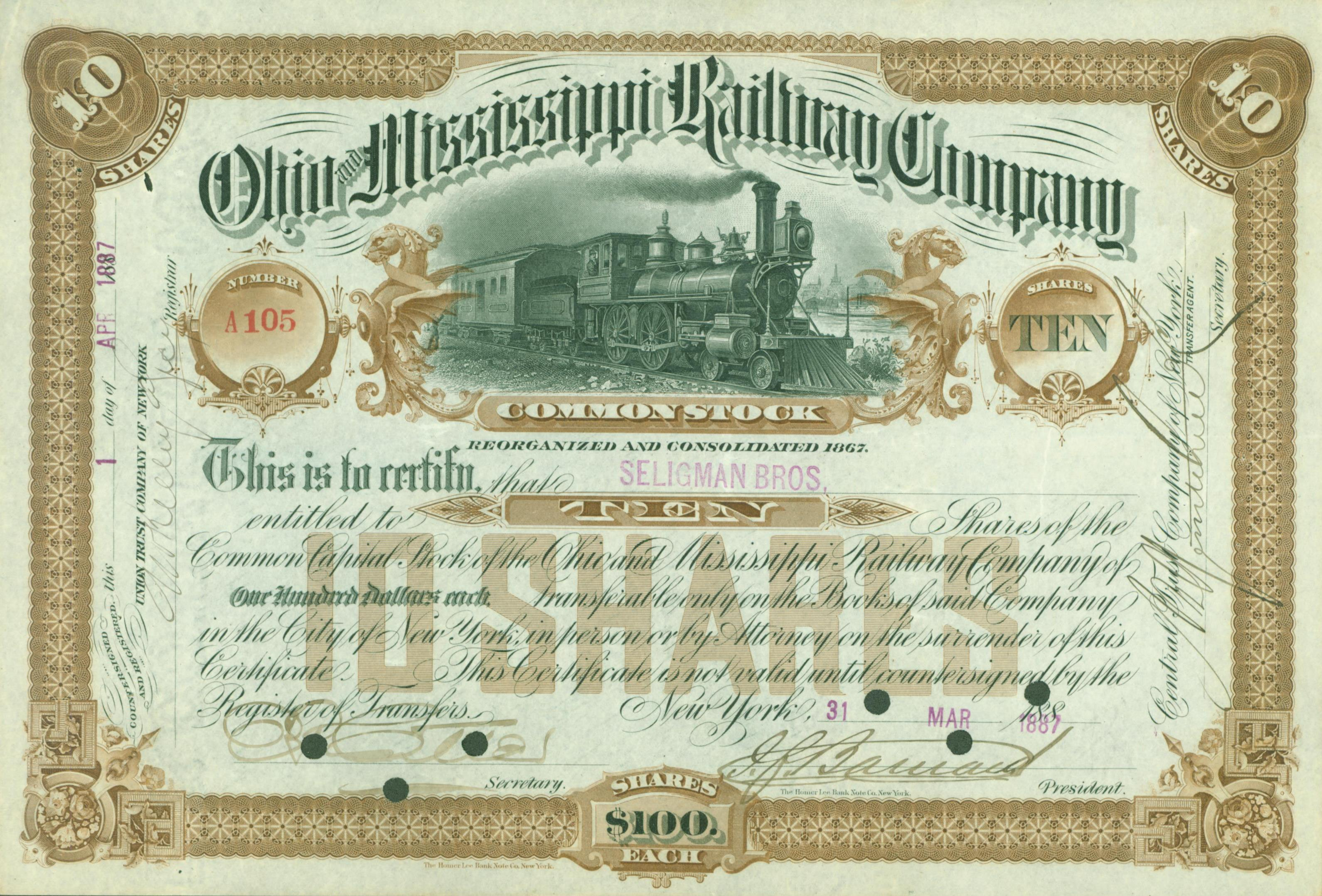
Share of the Ohio and Mississippi Railway Company, issued 31 March 1887

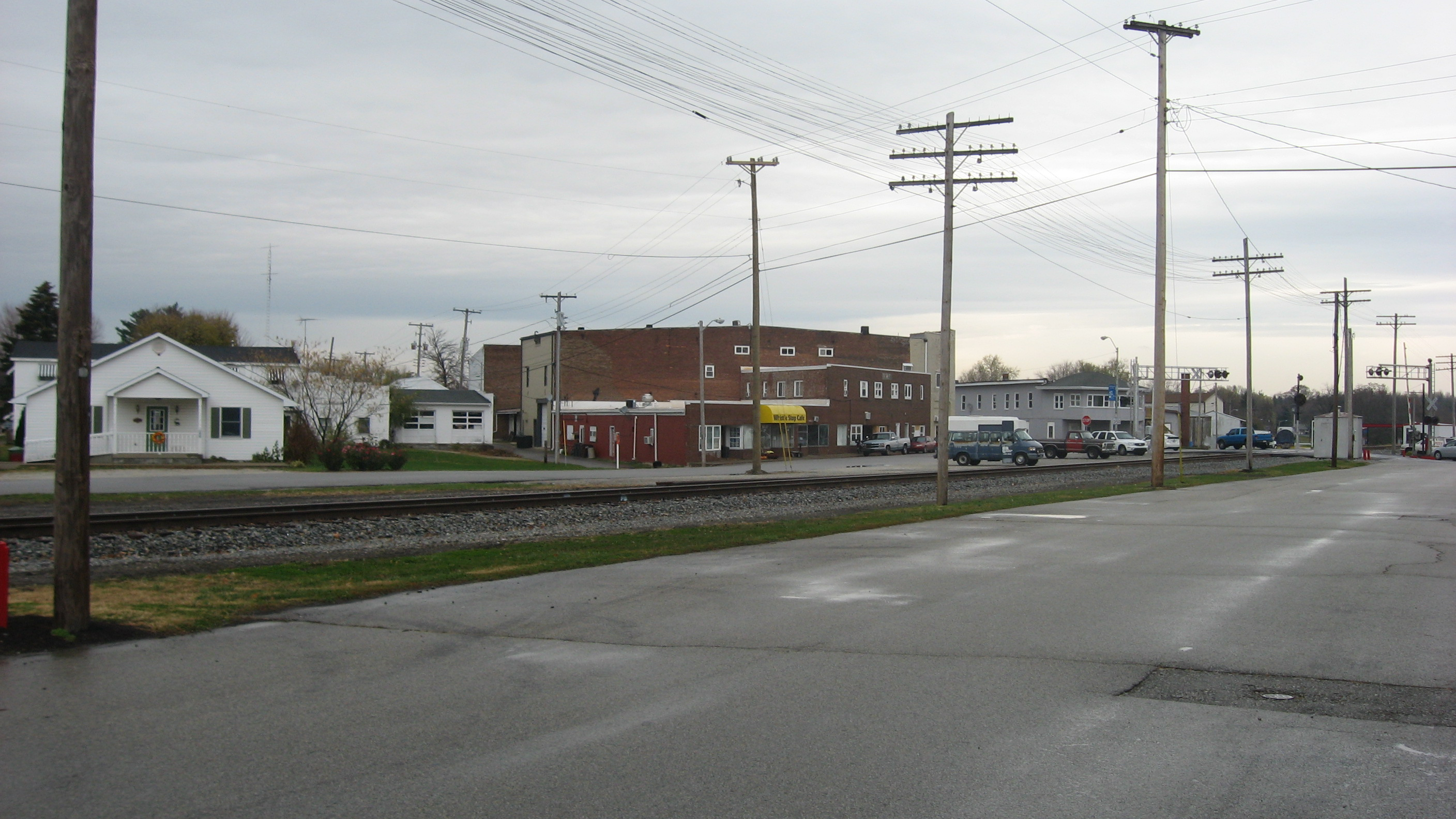
The former O&M line in Osgood, Indiana.

The Ohio and Mississippi Railway (earlier the Ohio and Mississippi Rail Road), abbreviated O&M, was a railroad operating between Cincinnati, Ohio, and East St. Louis, Illinois, from 1857 to 1893.

The railroad started in 1854 and paralleled the Cincinnati and Whitewater Canal. Its East St. Louis terminal near the Mississippi River was completed in 1857. It was a founding rail line of the Terminal Railroad Association of St. Louis. General Ormsby M. Mitchel (d. 1862) was a civil engineer on this project.

On September 17, 1861, during the American Civil War a train carrying union troops fell through a sabotaged bridge at Huron, Indiana, injuring or killing 100.

On October 6, 1866, the Adams Express Company car was robbed by the Reno Gang just east of Seymour, Indiana, becoming the first train robbery in U.S. history. The insolvent Ohio and Mississippi Railroad was reorganized in 1867 as the Ohio and Mississippi Railway.

When originally built the Ohio & Mississippi was built to the 6 feet (1.8 m) broad “Erie Gauge.” For a time a connection with a dual gauge section of the Cincinnati Hamilton & Dayton (CH&D), Atlantic Great Western (AGW) and the Erie Railway allowed travel on the Great Broad Route of Erie Gauge from St. Louis to New York City. In one day in 1871, Sunday, July 23, 1871, 400 miles (640 km) of the Ohio & Mississippi was converted to standard gauge.

The line came under the influence and later control of the Baltimore & Ohio Railroad, and combined with the former Marietta & Cincinnati connecting to the B&O at Parkersburg, West Virginia formed a continuous line between St. Louis and the east coast at Baltimore and Washington, DC. For many years, one of B&O's premier trains, the National Limited, traveled this route.

It merged in 1893 with the Baltimore and Ohio Southwestern Railway, and is now part of CSX Transportation's Indiana Subdivision and Illinois Subdivision.
