= Cross Subdivision =

Railway line in South Carolina

The Cross Subdivision is a railroad line owned by CSX Transportation in the U.S. State of South Carolina. The line runs from St. Stephen, South Carolina, to Cross, South Carolina, for a total of 14.6 miles (23.5 km). At its east end the line continues west from the Charleston Subdivision, and at its west end the track comes to an end.

== See also ==
- List of CSX Transportation lines
