= Old Road Subdivision =

Railway line in Kentucky

Overview
- Service type: Freight rail
- Status: Active
- Locale: Louisville metropolitan area, Bluegrass region, Lexington–Fayette metropolitan area
- Current operator: R.J. Corman Railroad Group
- Former operators: Louisville and Nashville Railroad; CSX Transportation

Route
- Termini: Anchorage, Kentucky, United States; Winchester, Kentucky, United States
- Distance travelled: 88 mi (142 km)

Technical
- Track gauge: 1,435 mm (4 ft 8 1/2 in)
- Operating speed: 10–40 mph (16–64 km/h)
- Track owner: R.J. Corman Railroad Group
- Timetable numbers: W, VB

The Old Road Subdivision is a railroad line owned & operated by R.J. Corman Railroad Group in the U.S. state of Kentucky. The line was formerly owned by CSX Transportation. The line runs from Anchorage, Kentucky, to Winchester, Kentucky, for a total of 101 miles (163 km). At its west end the line branches off of the LCL Subdivision and at its east end the line connects to the CC Subdivision.

== See also ==
- List of CSX Transportation lines
