= EK Subdivision =

Railway line in Kentucky

The EK Subdivision is a railroad line owned by CSX Transportation in the U.S. State of Kentucky. The line runs from Winchester, Kentucky, to Hazard, Kentucky, for a total of 117.5 miles (189.1 km). At its north end the line continues south from the CC Subdivision and at its south end the line continues south as the Rockhouse Subdivision.

== See also ==
- List of CSX Transportation lines
