= Birmingham Mineral Subdivision =

Railway line in Alabama

The Birmingham Mineral Subdivision is a railroad line owned by CSX Transportation in the U.S. State of Alabama. There are 3 sections to the Birmingham Mineral Subdivision.

== Magella to Brookwood ==
This line runs from Birmingham, Alabama, to Brookwood, Alabama, for a total of 34.7 miles. At its north end it branches off from the Boyles Terminal Subdivision and at its south end the track comes to an end.

== Huntsville #1 ==
This line runs from Bessemer, Alabama to Birmingham, Alabama for a total of 15.7 miles. At its south end it branches off from the Boyles Terminal Subdivision and at its north end it connects to the Magella to Brookwood section of the Birmingham Mineral Subdivision.

== Bradshaw Branch ==
This line runs from Bessemer, Alabama to Birmingham, Alabama for a total of 4.8 miles. At its south end it branches off from the Magella to Brookwood section of the Birmingham Mineral Subdivision and at its north end the track comes to an end.

== See also ==
- List of CSX Transportation lines
