= Rockhouse Subdivision =

Railway line in Kentucky

The Rockhouse Subdivision is a railroad line owned by CSX Transportation in the U.S. state of Kentucky. The line runs from Hazard, Kentucky, to Deane, Kentucky, for a total of 43.7 miles (70.3 km). At its west end the line continues east from the EK Subdivision and at its east end the line continues east as the E&BV Subdivision

== See also ==
- List of CSX Transportation lines
