= Erie West Subdivision =

Railway line in Pennsylvania and Ohio

- Map

Overview
- Other name(s): Lake Shore Subdivision, Chicago Line, Great Lakes Service Lane
- Status: Active
- Owner: CSX
- Locale: Lake Erie
- Termini: Euclid, Ohio; Buffalo, New York

Service
- Type: Freight, Inter-city rail
- System: CSX Transportation
- Operator(s): CSX, Amtrak

Technical
- Number of tracks: 2
- Track gauge: 4 ft 8 1/2 in (1,435 mm) standard gauge

The Erie West Subdivision is a railroad line owned by CSX Transportation in the U.S. states of Pennsylvania and Ohio. The line runs from Derby, New York southwest along the shore of Lake Erie to Cleveland, Ohio, along the former New York Central Railroad main line.

At its east end (east of downtown Buffalo), the Erie West Subdivision becomes the Buffalo Terminal Subdivision; at its west end (east of downtown Cleveland), it becomes the Cleveland Terminal Subdivision. This subdivision is also known as the Great Lakes Service Lane. Amtrak's Lake Shore Limited uses the Erie West Subdivision.

== History ==
The line was built by the Cleveland, Painesville and Ashtabula Railroad and opened in 1852. Through mergers, leases, and takeovers, it became part of the Lake Shore and Michigan Southern Railway, New York Central Railroad, and Conrail. When Conrail was broken up in 1999, the main line east of Cleveland, including the Erie West Subdivision, was assigned to CSX. In 2007 in Painesville, Ohio on this line, a major freight train derailment occurred resulting in the spill of ethanol and a large fire.

In 2010, its eastern terminus was extended to Buffalo when the Lake Shore Subdivision was transferred from the Albany Division to the Great Lakes Division and absorbed.

== See also ==
- CSX Bridge (Painesville, Ohio)
