= O&N Subdivision =

Railway line in Kentucky

The O&N Subdivision is a railroad line owned by CSX Transportation in the U.S. state of Kentucky. The line runs from Drakesboro, Kentucky, to Island, Kentucky, for a total of 12.9 miles (20.8 km). At its south end the track comes to an end and at its north end the track continues south from the Henderson Subdivision MH&E Branch.

== See also ==
- List of CSX Transportation lines
