= Tully Township, Ohio =

Tully Township, Ohio may refer to:

- Tully Township, Marion County, Ohio
- Tully Township, Van Wert County, Ohio
