= St. Louis Subdivision =

Railway line in Indiana and Illinois

The St. Louis Subdivision is a railroad line owned by CSX Transportation and leased to the Evansville Western Railway in the U.S. states of Indiana and Illinois. The line runs from Evansville, Indiana, to Okawville, Illinois, for a total of 122.2 miles (196.7 km). At its south end it branches off the Evansville Terminal Subdivision and at its north end the track comes to an end.

== See also ==
- List of CSX Transportation lines
