= S&NA North Subdivision =

Railway line in Tennessee and Alabama

The S&NA North Subdivision is a railroad line owned by CSX Transportation in the U.S. states of Tennessee and Alabama. The line runs from Brentwood, Tennessee, to Fultondale, Alabama, for a total of 186.9 miles (300.8 km). At its north end the line continues south from the Nashville Terminal Subdivision Main Section and at its south end the line continues south as the Boyles Terminal Subdivision of the Atlanta Division.

== See also ==
- List of CSX Transportation lines
