= Corbin Terminal Subdivision =

Railroad/yard in Kentucky, U.S.

Overview
- Status: Active
- Owner: CSX Transportation
- Locale: Kentucky, United States
- Termini: CC Subdivision (north); KD Subdivision (south)
- Stations: Corbin Yard

Service
- Type: Freight rail yard

The Corbin Terminal Subdivision is a railroad/yard that is owned by CSX Transportation in the U.S. State of Kentucky. The yard is located in Corbin, Kentucky. The CC Subdivision and the KD Subdivision runs from the north and south of the Corbin Terminal Subdivision.

== See also ==
- List of CSX Transportation lines
