= G&E Subdivision =

Railway line in West Virginia

The G&E Subdivision is a railroad line owned by CSX Transportation in the U.S. State of West Virginia. It was formerly part of the CSX Huntington East Division. It became part of the CSX Florence Division on June 20, 2016. The line runs from Rainelle, West Virginia, to Peaser Junction for 14.2 miles (22.9 km). At its south end (37°58′38″N 80°45′53″W) it intersects with the Sewell Valley Subdivision and at its north end the main track ends (38°05′16″N 80°39′14″W).

== See also ==
- List of CSX Transportation lines
