= Cincinnati Subdivision =

Railroad line in Kentucky, U.S.

The Cincinnati Subdivision is a railroad line owned by CSX Transportation in the U.S. State of Kentucky. The line runs from South Shore, Kentucky, to Silver Grove, Kentucky, for a total of 107.2 miles (172.5 km). At its east end the line junctions with the Northern Subdivision, and at its west end the line continues as a branch of the Cincinnati Terminal Subdivision.

== See also ==
- List of CSX Transportation lines
