= Lake Shore Subdivision =

Railway line in New York and Pennsylvania

The Lake Shore Subdivision is a former subdivision of a railroad line owned by CSX Transportation in the U.S. states of New York and Pennsylvania.

== History and features ==
This railroad line was built by two companies, the Buffalo and State Line Railroad in New York and the Erie and North East Railroad in Pennsylvania. It opened in 1852.

Through mergers, leases, and takeovers, it became part of the Lake Shore and Michigan Southern Railway, New York Central Railroad, Penn Central, and Conrail. When Conrail was broken up in 1999, the main line east of Cleveland, including the Lake Shore Subdivision, was assigned to CSX.

It runs from Buffalo, New York, southwest along the shore of Lake Erie to Erie, Pennsylvania, along the former New York Central Railroad main line.

At its east end, the Lake Shore Subdivision becomes the Buffalo Terminal Subdivision; the west end is west of downtown Erie, where the Erie West Subdivision begins.

Amtrak's Lake Shore Limited uses the Lake Shore Subdivision.

The CSX Transportation Albany Division Timetable #6, effective October 15, 2010, shows the Buffalo Terminal Subdivision extending south from Buffalo, New York to Hamburg, New York where it continues west as the Erie West Subdivision of the Great Lakes Division, thus eliminating the Lake Shore Subdivision.

== See also ==
- List of CSX Transportation lines
