= Fair Grounds Subdivision =

Railway line in New York

The Fair Grounds Subdivision is a railroad line owned by CSX Transportation in the U.S. state of New York. The line runs from Syracuse, New York, to Liverpool, New York. At its south end it leaves the newly created Syracuse Terminal Subdivision and at its north end it connects with the Baldwinsville Subdivision.

== History ==
It became part of New York Central and Conrail through leases, mergers, and takeovers, and was assigned to CSX Transportation in the 1999 breakup of Conrail.

== See also ==
- List of CSX Transportation lines
