= Mohawk Subdivision =

Railway line in New York

The Mohawk Subdivision is a railroad line owned by CSX Transportation in the U.S. state of New York. It is part of the Albany Division. The line runs from Amsterdam, NY west to Oneida, NY along the former New York Central Railroad main line. At its east end, east of downtown Amsterdam, the line becomes the Selkirk Subdivision. With the creation of the CSX Syracuse Terminal Subdivision, the west end is at Oneida, New York.

Amtrak's Empire Service, Lake Shore Limited, and Maple Leaf operate over the entire Mohawk Subdivision.

As of January 24, 2011 at 0930 hours, the Syracuse Terminal Subdivision went into service. It broke-up the Mohawk Subdivision. The Syracuse Terminal Subdivision east end starts in Oneida, New York, where the Mohawk Subdivision leaves off and the west end is in Syracuse, New York, where the Rochester Subdivision picks up.

== History ==
In 1836, the Utica and Schenectady Railroad opened a line from Schenectady west via Amsterdam to Utica. The Syracuse and Utica Railroad opened in 1839, extending the line west to Syracuse. The portion of the Mohawk Subdivision west from downtown Syracuse was opened in 1853 by the New York Central Railroad as part of a more direct route from Syracuse to Rochester. The entire line became part of the New York Central Railroad and Conrail through leases, mergers and takeovers, and was assigned to CSX Transportation in the 1999 breakup of Conrail.

== De Witt Yard ==
De Witt Yard is a railyard in East Syracuse, New York (6228 Fremont Rd ) (part of DeWitt, New York). It was originally built by the New York Central in the 1870s. It is now located in the Mohawk Subdivision of CSXT.

A study concluded in 2017 identified the yard as the best location in central New York as an 'inland port', or dry port. New York transportation officials agreed to provide funds to transform the rail yard into an intermodal cargo facility to ship containers to and from ocean ports, namely through ExpressRail services in Port Newark–Elizabeth Marine Terminal: the largest container port in the Port of New York and New Jersey.

== See also ==
- List of CSX Transportation lines
