= Stony River Subdivision =

Railway line in West Virginia

Overview
- Status: Operational
- Owner: CSX Transportation
- Locale: Grant County, West Virginia
- Termini: Bayard; Mount Storm Power Station

Service
- Type: Freight rail
- System: CSX Transportation
- Operator(s): CSX Transportation

Technical
- Line length: 16.7 mi
- Number of tracks: 1
- Track gauge: 4 ft 8 1/2 in (1,435 mm) standard gauge

The Stony River Subdivision is a railroad line owned by CSX Transportation in the U.S. state of West Virginia. The line is located in Bayard, West Virginia, for a total of 16.7 miles (26.9 km). At its north end the line connects with the Thomas Subdivision and at its south end the line comes to an end.

== See also ==
- List of CSX Transportation lines
