= Etowah Subdivision =

Railway line in Tennessee and Georgia

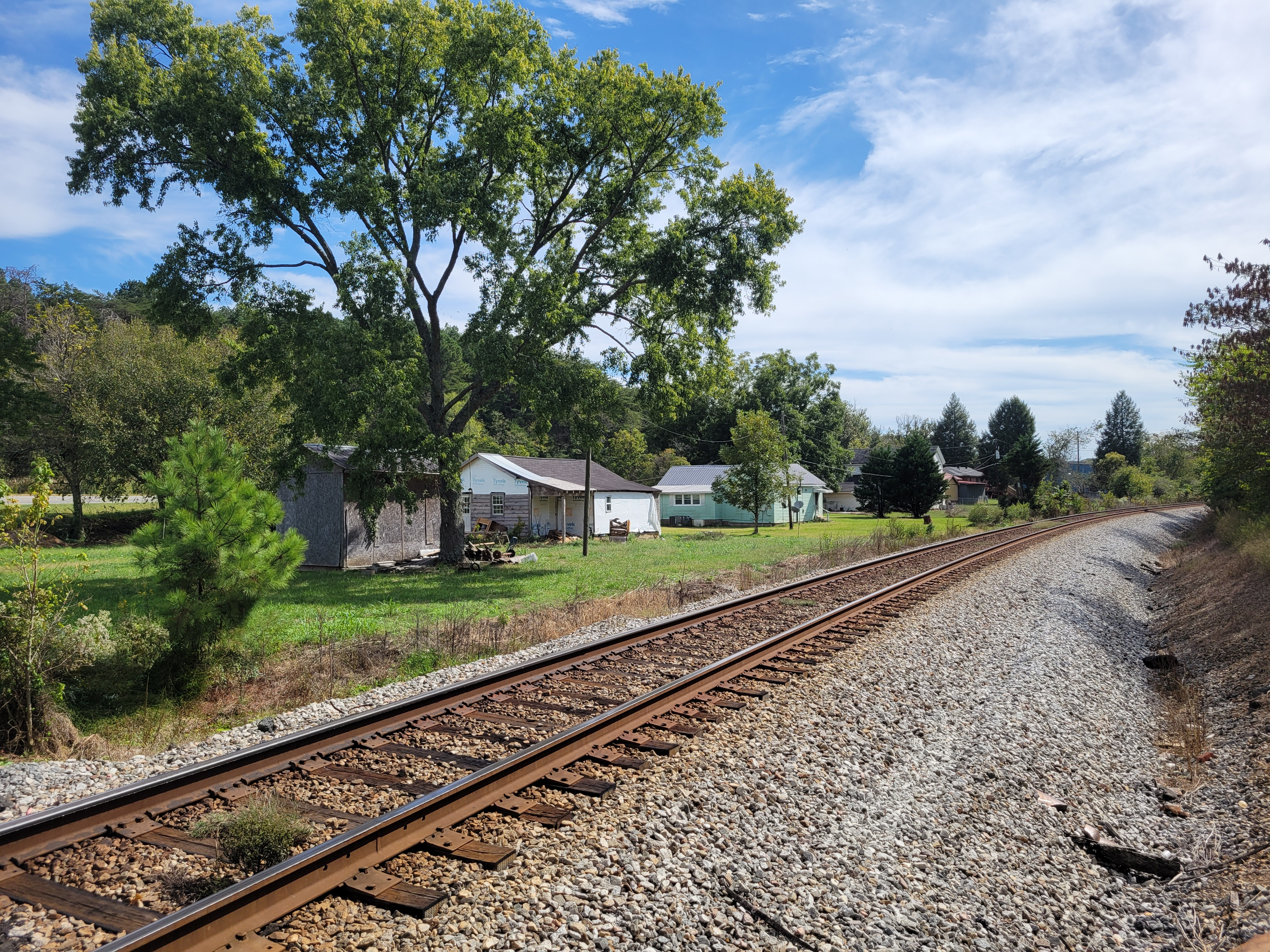
Railroad tracks at Vaughn Dairy Road in Rydal, Georgia

The Etowah Subdivision is a railroad line owned by CSX Transportation in the U.S. states of Tennessee and Georgia. The line runs between Etowah, Tennessee, and Cartersville, Georgia, for a total of 89.3 miles (143.7 km). At its north end it continues south from the KD Subdivision and at its south end it continues south as the W&A Subdivision.

== See also ==
- List of CSX Transportation lines
