= Coal Run Subdivision =

Railroad line in Kentucky, U.S.

The Coal Run Subdivision is a railroad line owned by CSX Transportation in the U.S. State of Kentucky. The line runs from Pikeville, Kentucky, to Kimper, Kentucky, for a total of 31.1 miles (50.1 km). At its west end the line continues east from the Big Sandy Subdivision and at its east end the line comes to an end. The Winns Branch branches off of the Coal Run Subdivision

== See also ==
- List of CSX Transportation lines
