= Indiana Subdivision =

Railway line in Ohio and Indiana

The Indiana Subdivision is a railroad line owned and operated by CSX Transportation in the U.S. states of Ohio and Indiana. The line runs from Cincinnati, Ohio, west to Washington, Indiana, along a former Baltimore and Ohio Railroad line.

At its east end, the Indiana Subdivision becomes the Cincinnati Terminal Subdivision; it continues west as the Illinois Subdivision. Along the way, the line intersects the Hoosier Subdivision at Mitchell, Indiana.

== History ==
The line, built by the Ohio and Mississippi Railroad, was completed in 1857. It passed to the Baltimore and Ohio Railroad and CSX via leases and mergers.
