= Camak Subdivision =

Railway line in Georgia, United States

The Camak Subdivision is a railroad line owned by CSX Transportation in the U.S. State of Georgia. The line runs from Camak, Georgia, to Milledgeville, Georgia, for a total of 47.0 miles (75.6 km). At its north end it continues south from the Camak Yard and at its south end the track comes to an end.

== See also ==
- List of CSX Transportation lines
