= Carrothers Secondary =

Railway line in the United States

The Carrothers Secondary is a railway line that consists of approximately 41 miles (66 km) of track from Toledo to Tiffin, Ohio via Woodville.

== History ==
The line, constructed in the early 1870s, was formerly a portion of the Pennsylvania Railroad's branch line from the company's Pittsburgh, Fort Wayne and Chicago Railway main line (near Mansfield) to Toledo, Ohio and, several decades later, Detroit, Michigan.

The Toledo to Woodville line was one of the Conrail lines that was originally transferred to CSX circa 1999. PRR abandoned the Carrothers–Mansfield segment in 1959. Conrail abandoned the Tiffin–Carrothers segment in 1984. In June 1988, Conrail notified the Interstate Commerce Commission of its intentions to abandon the Woodville to Tiffin segment. The Tiffin-Seneca-Sandusky Port Authority purchased the Woodville to Tiffin line from Conrail circa 1989 and contracted the Indiana Hi-Rail Corp to operate it up until the IHRC bankruptcy.

== Current ==
Today, the line consists of approximately:

- 20 miles (32 km) of track from Toledo to Woodville owned by CSX Transportation; and

- 21 miles (34 km) long from Woodville to Tiffin is owned by the Sandusky-Seneca-Tiffin Port Authority (SST Port Authority) and operated by the Northern Ohio and Western Railway.
