= Bruceton Subdivision =

Railway line in Tennessee

The Bruceton Subdivision is a railroad line owned by CSX Transportation in the U.S. State of Tennessee. The line runs from Nashville, Tennessee, to Camden, Tennessee, for a total of 87.7 miles (141.1 km). At its east end the line continues west from the Nashville Terminal Subdivision and at its west end the line continues west as the Memphis Subdivision.

== See also ==
- List of CSX Transportation lines
