= Georgia Subdivision =

Railway line in Georgia, USA

The Georgia Subdivision is a railroad line owned by CSX Transportation in the U.S. State of Georgia. The line runs from Harrisonville Yard in Augusta, Georgia, to Lithonia, Georgia, for a total of 145.9 miles. At its east end it continues west from the Atlanta Terminal Subdivision and at its west end it continues west as the Augusta Subdivision of the Florence Division.

== See also ==
- List of CSX Transportation lines
