= Memphis Terminal Subdivision =

Railroad in Tennessee, United States

The Memphis Terminal Subdivision is a railroad line owned by CSX Transportation in the U.S. State of Tennessee. The line is located in Memphis, Tennessee, for a total of 3.2 miles (5.1 km). The line runs from N. Graham Street, at the west end of the Memphis Subdivision, through the CSX Leewood Yard, to downtown where it terminates as it merges into the Union Pacific Memphis Subdivision at Kentucky Street. The line runs from Leewood to Aulon Junction on the Canadian National Shelby Subdivision.

== See also ==
- List of CSX Transportation lines
