= Illinois Subdivision =

Railway line in Indiana and Illinois

The Illinois Subdivision is a railroad line owned and operated by CSX Transportation in the U.S. states of Indiana and Illinois. The line runs from Washington, Indiana, west to East St. Louis, Illinois, along a former Baltimore and Ohio Railroad line.

At its east end, the Illinois Subdivision becomes the Indiana Subdivision. At its west end in East St. Louis, near the west end of the St. Louis Line Subdivision, it meets the Terminal Railroad Association of St. Louis. Along the way, the line intersects the CE&D Subdivision at Vincennes, Indiana.

== History ==
The line, built by the Ohio and Mississippi Railroad, was completed in 1857. It passed to the Baltimore and Ohio Railroad and CSX via leases and mergers.

In the 2000s, traffic slowly started to fall due to declining customers and CSX acquiring Conrail's St. Louis line which ran parallel to the Illinois Subdivision. CSX began to reroute the remaining trains onto the St. Louis line since it could handle more traffic. By 2015, only 4 trains still used the Illinois Subdivision before the last trains ran through in July 2015.

In the summer of 2015, the Illinois Subdivision line was cut in Caseyville, Illinois, and just west of Flora, Illinois. This marked the temporary closure of the line from Flora west. A plastic manufacturer and three grain buyers in Richland and Lawrence counties continue to have access to the line with trains from the east. In April 2017, the line west of Flora was briefly reopened for railcar storage. CSX initially planned to store more cars but due to the Illinois Commerce Commission requesting that they replace most of the crossings which were inactive and had their gates removed after it was initially taken OOS, they only ran one storage train. After other complaints they removed the cars stored between Aviston, Illinois and Shattuc, Illinois in 2019. (Update 11/6/25) It marks over 10 years since the Illinois Subdivision's shut down from Flora, Illinois and to O'Fallon, Illinois. The future of this once action packed line is now facing an uncertain fate. As CSX Transportation has no plans to reactivate or to even have any future plans on this line. Since 2021 sidings have been ripped out and diamonds in Odin, Illinois and Shattuc remain cut.
