= C&N Subdivision =

Railway line in Ohio

- Map

Overview
- Status: Active
- Owner: CUOH
- Locale: Ohio
- Termini: Newark; Columbus

Service
- Type: Freight rail
- System: CUOH
- Operator(s): CSX, CUOH, NS

Technical
- Number of tracks: 1
- Track gauge: 4 ft 8 1/2 in (1,435 mm) standard gauge

The C&N Subdivision is a railroad line owned by CSX Transportation and operated by the Columbus and Ohio River Railroad in the U.S. State of Ohio. The line runs from Newark, Ohio, to Columbus, Ohio, for a total of about 30 miles (48 km). At its east end the line continues west from the Columbus and Ohio River Railroad Mt. Vernon Sub and at its west end it connects to the Norfolk Southern Dayton District.

== See also ==
- List of CSX Transportation lines
