= Belton Subdivision =

Railway line in South Carolina

The Belton Subdivision is a railroad line owned by CSX Transportation in the U.S. State of South Carolina. This line runs from Spartanburg, South Carolina, to Pelzer, South Carolina, for a total of 49.7 miles (80.0 km). At its east end, the line continues to travel west from the Spartanburg Subdivision and at its west end, it continues west as the Greenville and Western Railway.

== See also ==
- List of CSX Transportation lines
