= Nashville Subdivision =

Railway line in Tennessee

The Nashville Subdivision is a railroad line owned by CSX Transportation in the U.S. state of Tennessee. The line runs from Brentwood, Tennessee, to Columbia, Tennessee, for a total of 30.8 miles. At its north end the line continues south from the Nashville Terminal Subdivision and at its south end it continues south as the Tennessee Southern Railroad.

== See also ==
- List of CSX Transportation lines
