= St. Louis Line Subdivision =

Railway line in Indiana and Illinois

The St. Louis Line Subdivision is a railroad line owned by CSX Transportation in the U.S. states of Indiana and Illinois. The line runs from Indianapolis, Indiana, west-southwesterly to East St. Louis, Illinois, along a former Conrail line, partly former New York Central Railroad trackage and partly former Pennsylvania Railroad trackage.

At its east end near Avon Yard, the St. Louis Line Subdivision continues through downtown Indianapolis as the Indianapolis Terminal Subdivision. Its west end is near Rose Lake Yard in East St. Louis, where it meets the Terminal Railroad Association of St. Louis. Along the way, the line intersects the Lafayette Subdivision at Greencastle, Indiana, and the CE&D Subdivision and Danville Secondary Subdivision at Terre Haute, Indiana. Its west end is near the west end of the Illinois Subdivision.

== History ==
The St. Louis Line Subdivision was formed from two main lines, joined by a short connecting track in Terre Haute, Indiana. From Terre Haute east to Indianapolis, the Indianapolis and St. Louis Railroad opened in 1870; this became part of the New York Central Railroad (NYC) through leases and mergers. The line west of Terre Haute was built by the Terre Haute and Indianapolis Rail Road (in Indiana) and the St. Louis, Vandalia and Terre Haute Railroad (in Illinois), and was also completed in 1870. These companies became part of the Pennsylvania Railroad (PRR) through leases and mergers.

Both lines became part of Penn Central Transportation and then Conrail, which decided to downgrade the PRR's line east of Terre Haute and the NYC's line west of Terre Haute, building a short connection in Terre Haute and forming the St. Louis Line. The line was assigned to CSX in Conrail's 1999 breakup.

Amtrak's National Limited used the line between 1971 and 1976, with stops at Effingham and Terre Haute.
