= Boyles Terminal Subdivision =

Railway line in Alabama

The Boyles Terminal Subdivision is a railroad line owned by CSX Transportation in the U.S. State of Alabama. The line runs from New Castle, Alabama, to Hoover, Alabama, for a total of 17.3 miles. At its north end it continues south from the S&NA North Subdivision which is part of the Nashville Division and at its south end it continues south as the S&NA South Subdivision.

== See also ==
- List of CSX Transportation lines
