= Long Fork Subdivision =

Railway line in Kentucky

The Long Fork Subdivision was a railroad line owned and operated by CSX Transportation in the U.S. state of Kentucky. It split from the E&BV Subdivision at Martin and ran south to a dead end at Hi Hat. CSX filed to abandon all but the first 3 miles (4.8 km) from Martin to Salisbury in 2003; it had not seen traffic since c. 1990. However, due to complications regarding possible leasing by a coal company, the line was not abandoned until 2006. As of 2006, that lease is planned to take effect.

The line was built in the 1910s or early 1920s by the Long Fork Railway, a Baltimore and Ohio Rail Road subsidiary. The Chesapeake and Ohio Railway acquired it in 1933, and it passed through mergers to CSX.
