= Russell Subdivision =

Railroad line in Kentucky

The Russell Subdivision is a railroad line owned by CSX Transportation in the U.S. state of Kentucky. The line runs from Russell, Kentucky, to Greenup, Kentucky, for a total of 7.5 miles (12.1 km). At its south end the line continues north from the Kanawha Subdivision of the Florence Division and at its north end the line continues north as the Northern Subdivision.

== See also ==
- List of CSX Transportation lines
