= PD Subdivision =

Railway line in Florida and Alabama

The PD Subdivision is a railroad line owned by CSX Transportation in Florida and Alabama. The line runs from Pensacola, Florida, north to Flomaton, Alabama, for a total of 41.0 miles (66.0 km). At its south end it connects to the Florida Gulf & Atlantic Railroad and at its north end it continues north as the M&M Subdivision.

== History ==
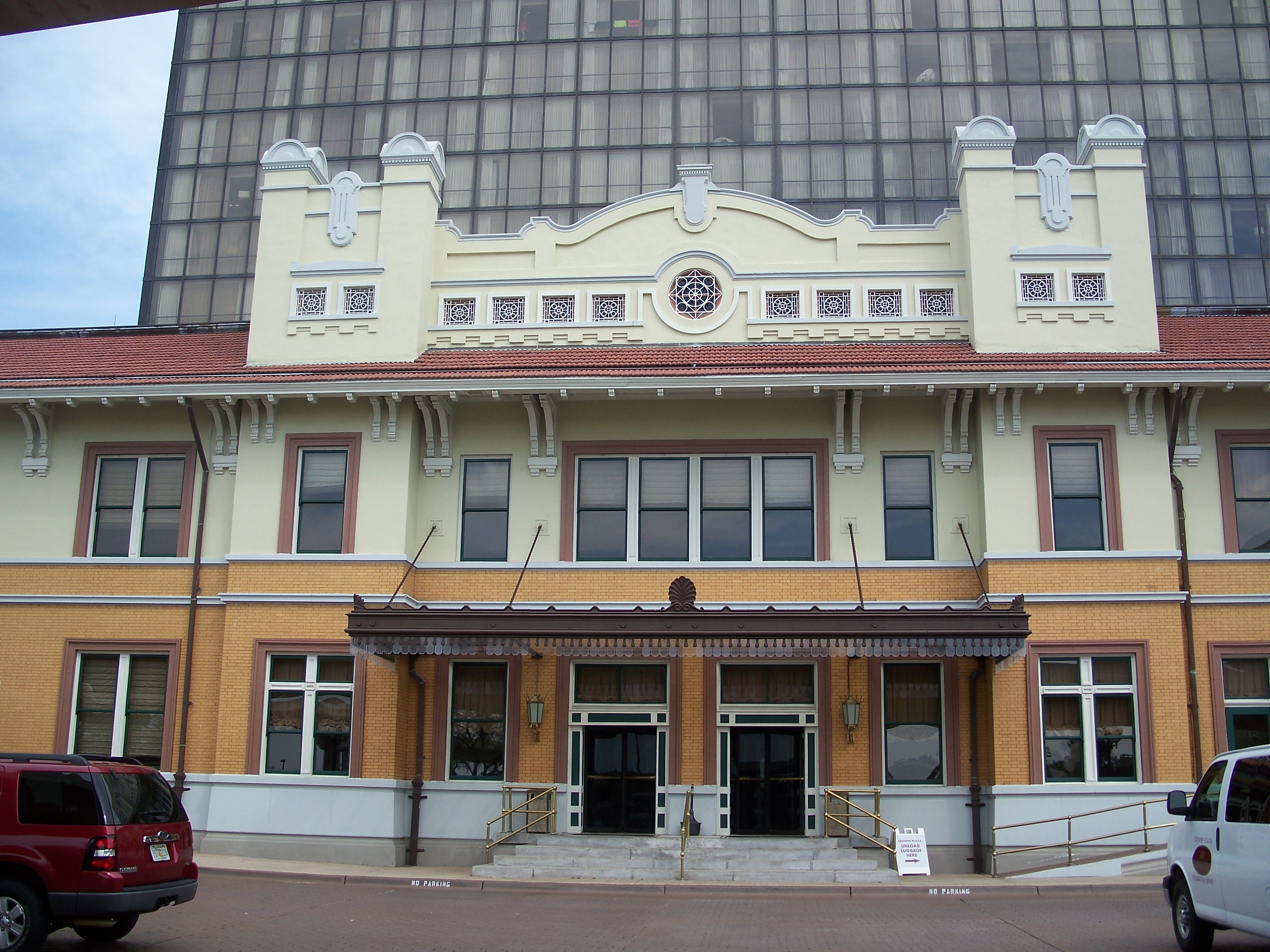
The historic Pensacola depot built by the Louisville and Nashville Railroad in 1912.

The PD Subdivision was originally built as the Pensacola Railroad, a branch of the Alabama and Florida Railroad. Construction on the line began in 1861 near the start of the American Civil War. Much of the road needed to be rebuilt due to the war and the line was completed by 1869. On February 27, 1880, the line was bought by the Louisville and Nashville Railroad.

In 1882, the L&N built a line east to Chattahoochee under the name of the Pensacola and Atlantic Railroad, a subsidiary of the L&N; that line is now the Florida Gulf & Atlantic Railroad. The L&N also built the Louisville and Nashville Passenger Station and Express Building in Pensacola in 1912, replacing an earlier depot nearby. The 1912 depot still stands and is now part of the Crown Plaza Hotel.

The Louisville and Nashville Railroad was absorbed by the Seaboard Coast Line Railroad in 1982, which became CSX Transportation in 1986. Amtrak's Sunset Limited once used the line when it extended beyond New Orleans to Orlando. Amtrak service was suspended due to Hurricane Katrina and never resumed east of New Orleans.

== See also ==
- List of CSX Transportation lines
