= Gainesville Midland Subdivision =

Railway line in Georgia

The Gainesville Midland Subdivision is a railroad line owned by CSX Transportation in the U.S. State of Georgia. The line runs from Athens, Georgia, to Gainesville, Georgia, for a total of 38.3 miles (61.6 km). At its south end, it branches off from the Abbeville Subdivision and at its north end the track comes to an end. The purpose of this line is to connect the CSX Abbeville Subdivision with the Norfolk Southern Piedmont District.

See also

- List of CSX Transportation lines
