= Big Sandy Subdivision (CSX Transportation) =

Railway line in Kentucky

The Big Sandy Subdivision is a railroad line owned and operated by CSX Transportation in the U.S. state of Kentucky. The line runs from Catlettsburg south to Elkhorn City along a former Chesapeake and Ohio Railway line.

At its north end, the Big Sandy Subdivision junctions with the Kanawha Subdivision, which heads east to West Virginia and Virginia and northwest to Ohio. The line continues from the south end as the Kingsport Subdivision; this was the historic change between the C&O and Clinchfield Railroad. From north to south, the following lines branch off, most to dead ends:

- Dawkins Subdivision
- Middle Creek Subdivision
- E&BV Subdivision (part of a continuous line to Winchester)
- Coal Run Subdivision
- SV&E Subdivision
