= CE&D Subdivision =

Railway line in Indiana

The CE&D Subdivision is a railroad line owned by CSX Transportation in the U.S. State of Indiana. The line runs from Perrysville, Indiana, to Evansville, Indiana, for a total of 145.6 miles. At its north end the line continues south from the Woodland Subdivision of the Chicago Division and at its south end the line continues south as the Evansville Terminal Subdivision. In Terre Haute, Indiana it crosses the St. Louis Line Subdivision

== See also ==
- List of CSX Transportation lines
