= Chattanooga Subdivision =

Railway line in Tennessee, Alabama, and Georgia, U.S.

The Chattanooga Subdivision is a railroad line owned by CSX Transportation in the U.S. states of Tennessee, Alabama and Georgia. The line runs from Nashville, Tennessee, to Chattanooga, Tennessee, for a total of 140.0 miles (225.3 km). At its north end the line continues south from the Nashville Terminal Subdivision and at its south end the line continues south as the W&A Subdivision.

== See also ==
- List of CSX Transportation lines
