= Main Line Subdivision =

Railway line in Kentucky and Tennessee

The Main Line Subdivision is a railroad line owned by CSX Transportation in the U.S. states of Kentucky and Tennessee. The line runs from Louisville, Kentucky, to Nashville, Tennessee, for a total of 165.5 miles (266.3 km). At its north end the line continues south from the Louisville Terminal Subdivision and at its south end the line continues south as the Nashville Terminal Subdivision.

The Main Line Subdivision was originally built as the namesake line of the Louisville and Nashville Railroad. Through various mergers, it passed through the Family Lines System, Seaboard System, and finally to CSX.

== See also ==
- List of CSX Transportation lines
