= Martel, Ohio =

Unincorporated community in Ohio, U.S.

Coordinates: 40°40′08″N 82°54′37″W

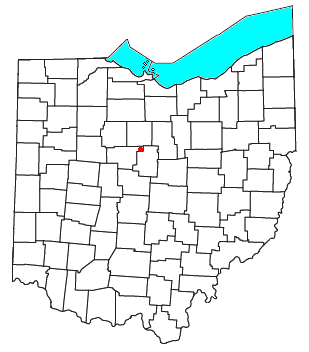
Location of Martel, Ohio

Martel is an unincorporated community in central Tully Township, Marion County, Ohio, United States. It had a post office with the ZIP code 43335. After its post office was closed, the community was made part of the Caledonia ZIP code area.

== History ==
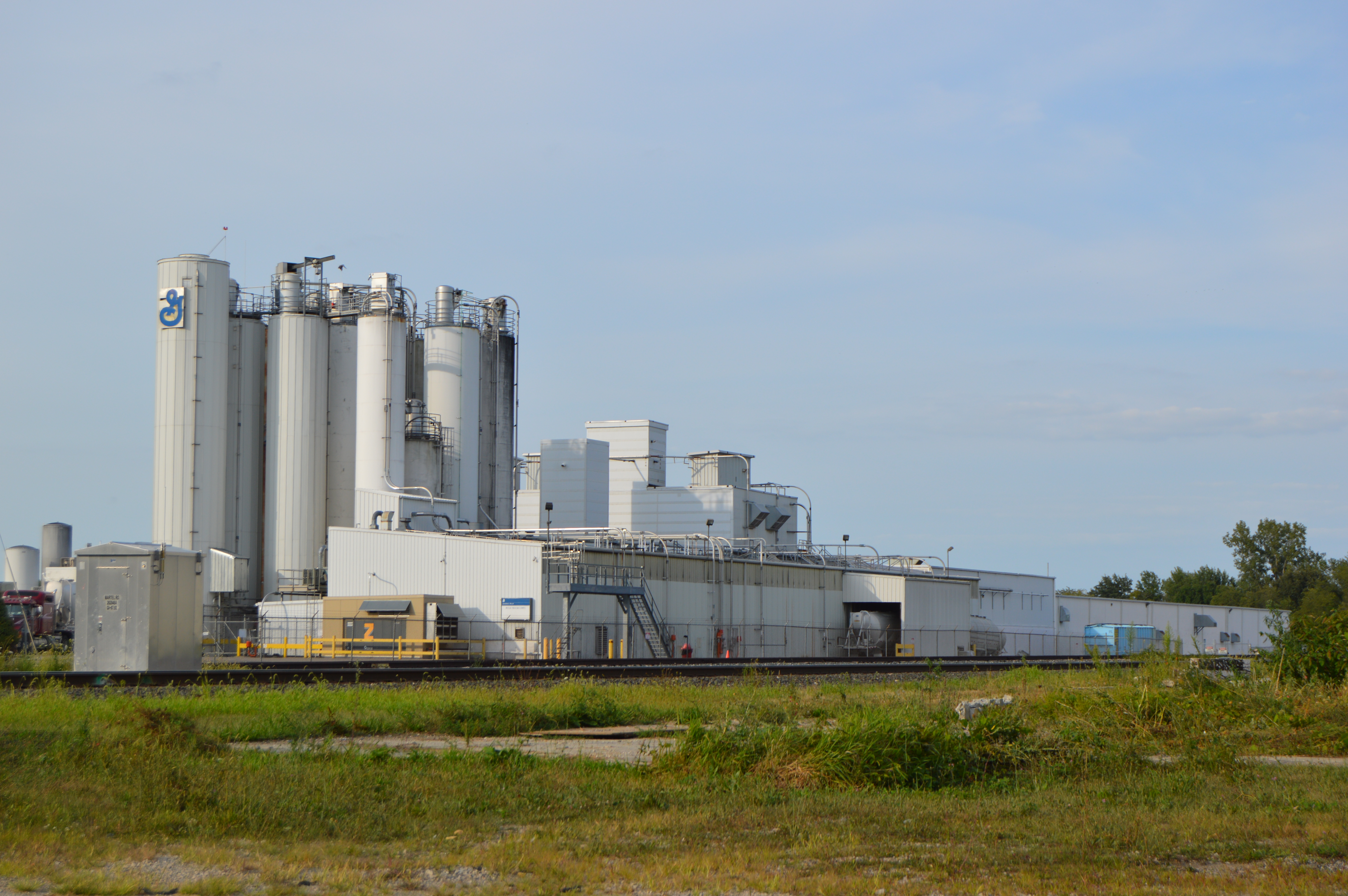
Martel General Mills processing plant

Martel was laid out in 1881. A post office called Martel was established in 1883, and remained in operation until 1996. Besides the post office, Martel had a railroad station. Martel also appears on some maps as Baker, Three Locusts, and Tully City.
