= Richmond Subdivision =

Railway line in Ohio and Indiana

The Richmond Subdivision is a railroad line owned by CSX Transportation and operated by Indiana Eastern Railroad in the U.S. states of Ohio and Indiana. The line runs from Fernald, Ohio, to Richmond, Indiana, for a total of 43.0 miles (69.2 km). The line is dead-ended at its north and south ends and intersects in the middle with the Indianapolis Subdivision.

== See also ==
- List of CSX Transportation lines
