= Sundial, West Virginia =

- Unincorporated community
- Location within West Virginia Location within the United States
- Coordinates: 37°52′34″N 81°30′52″W
- Country: United States
- State: West Virginia
- County: Raleigh
- Elevation: 1,037 ft (316 m)
- Time zone: UTC-5 (Eastern (EST))
  - Summer (DST): UTC-4 (EDT)
- Area codes: 304 & 681
- GNIS feature ID: 1555753

Sundial is an unincorporated community in Raleigh County, West Virginia, United States. Sundial is located on West Virginia Route 3, 19 miles (31 km) west-northwest of Beckley.
