= A&WP Subdivision =

Railroad line in the USA

The A&WP Subdivision is a railroad line that is part of the Atlanta Division, which is owned by CSX Transportation in the U.S. states of Alabama and Georgia. The line runs from Union City, Georgia, to Montgomery, Alabama, for a total of 157.6 miles. At its north end it continues south from the Atlanta Terminal Subdivision Chart D and at its south end it continues south as the M&M Subdivision.

== See also ==
- List of CSX Transportation lines
- Atlanta and West Point Railroad
- Montgomery and West Point Railroad
- Western Railway of Alabama
