= Carman Subdivision =

Railroad line in New York, U.S.

The Carman Subdivision is a railroad line owned by CSX Transportation in the U.S. state of New York. The line is located in and near Schenectady along a former New York Central Railroad line. It connects the Hudson Subdivision in Schenectady with the Selkirk Subdivision at Rotterdam.

== See also ==
- List of CSX Transportation lines
