= Baldwinsville Subdivision =

Railway line in New York

The Baldwinsville Subdivision is a railroad line owned by CSX Transportation in the U.S. State of New York. The line runs from Syracuse, New York, northwest to Oswego, New York. It branches off the Fair Grounds Subdivision.

== History ==
The subdivision became part of New York Central and Conrail through leases, mergers, and takeovers, and was assigned to CSX Transportation in the 1999 breakup of Conrail.

== See also ==
- List of CSX Transportation lines
