= Port Subdivision =

Railway line in New York

The Port Subdivision is a railroad line owned by CSX Transportation in the U.S. state of New York. The line runs from Selkirk north to Albany along a former New York Central Railroad line. At its south end, the Port Subdivision junctions with the Castleton Subdivision and River Subdivision; its north end is at the Port of Albany, served by the Albany Port Railroad.

== See also ==
- List of CSX Transportation lines
