= Nallen, West Virginia =

- Unincorporated community
- Location within West Virginia Location within the United States
- Coordinates: 38°06′38″N 80°52′37″W
- Country: United States
- State: West Virginia
- Counties: Fayette and Nicholas
- Elevation: 1,890 ft (580 m)
- Time zone: UTC-5 (Eastern (EST))
  - Summer (DST): UTC-4 (EDT)
- ZIP code: 26680
- Area codes: 304 & 681
- GNIS feature ID: 1555187

Nallen is an unincorporated community in Fayette and Nicholas counties, West Virginia, United States. Nallen is located along West Virginia Route 41, 12 miles (19 km) south of Summersville. Nallen has a post office with ZIP code 26680.

The community was named after John I. Nallen, a businessperson in the lumber industry.

It was the home of the Wilderness Lumber Company. The lumber mill operated its own railroad consisting of shay locomotives to bring the logs from the surrounding forest areas to the mill for over thirty years. The site of the saw mill was later replaced by an asphalt company in the 1970s and has since been replaced by a modern log cabin dealership on the same property.
