= St. Lawrence Subdivision =

Railway line in New York

The St. Lawrence Subdivision is a railroad line owned by CSX Transportation in the U.S. state of New York. The line runs from Syracuse, New York, north to Massena, New York, along a former New York Central Railroad line. At its south end, it meets the Syracuse Terminal Subdivision; its north end is at the south end of the Montreal Subdivision. Along the way it junctions with the Fulton Subdivision at Woodard, New York, (near Liverpool).

== History ==
The section from Richland north to Watertown was opened by the Watertown and Rome Railroad in the early 1850s. The Oswego and Rome Railroad opened the short piece from Richland west to Pulaski in 1866, and the Syracuse Northern Railroad opened in the early 1870s from Syracuse north to Pulaski. To the north, the Potsdam Railroad opened in 1856 from Potsdam to Norwood, and the Potsdam and Watertown Railroad built from Potsdam south to Watertown in the 1850s. The short Norwood and Montreal Railroad completed the line north from Norwood to Massena in 1886. All of the companies became part of the Rome, Watertown and Ogdensburg Railroad, New York Central Railroad, and Conrail. In the 1999 breakup of Conrail, the line was assigned to CSX Transportation.

== See also ==
- List of CSX Transportation lines
- Conrail
- Canadian National Railway
- Surface Transportation Board
