= Fulton Subdivision =

Railway line in New York

- Map

Overview
- Status: Active
- Owner: Canadian National Railway
- Locale: Oswego County
- Termini: Syracuse; Oswego

Service
- Type: Freight rail
- System: CN
- Operator(s): CN

Technical
- Number of tracks: 1
- Track gauge: 4 ft 8 1/2 in (1,435 mm) standard gauge

The Fulton Subdivision is a railroad line owned by Canadian National in the U.S. State of New York. The line runs from Liverpool, New York, north to Oswego, New York. At its south end the line branches off of the St. Lawrence Subdivision.

== History ==
The CN Fulton Sub became part of New York Central and Conrail through leases, mergers, and takeovers, and was assigned to CSX Transportation in the 1999 breakup of Conrail. Under the purchase of CSX's St. Lawrence Subdivision by the Canadian National Railway in August 2019, the Fulton Line was sold off as well with the line. Current ownership by CSX expires on May 21, 2020, with CN assuming duties thereafter.

== See also ==
- List of CSX Transportation lines
