= Northern Subdivision (CSX) =

Railway line in Kentucky and Ohio

- Map

Overview
- Status: Active
- Owner: CSX Transportation
- Locale: Ohio
- Termini: Columbus; Greenup

Service
- Type: Freight rail
- System: CSX Transportation
- Operator(s): CSX Transportation

Technical
- Number of tracks: 2
- Track gauge: 4 ft 8 1/2 in (1,435 mm)

The Northern Subdivision is a railroad line owned by CSX Transportation in the U.S. states of Kentucky and Ohio. The line runs from Greenup, Kentucky, to Columbus, Ohio, for a total of 106.4 miles (171.2 km). At its south end the line continues north from the Russell Subdivision and at its north end the line continues north as the Columbus Subdivision of the Great Lakes Division.

== See also ==
- List of CSX Transportation lines
