= Deane, Kentucky =

Unincorporated community in Kentucky, United States

- Unincorporated community
- Location in Kentucky Location in the United States
- Coordinates: 37°14′19″N 82°46′24″W
- Country: United States
- State: Kentucky
- County: Letcher
- Elevation: 1,335 ft (407 m)
- Time zone: UTC-5 (Eastern (EST))
  - Summer (DST): UTC-4 (EDT)
- ZIP codes: 41812
- GNIS feature ID: 507826

Deane is an unincorporated community located in Letcher County, Kentucky, United States. The community still operates a post office with the ZIP code 41812.
