= Syracuse Terminal Subdivision =

Railway line in New York

Overview
- Status: Active
- Owner: CSX
- Locale: Rochester, Upstate New York
- Termini: Oneida; Syracuse

Service
- Type: Freight, Inter-city rail
- System: CSX Transportation
- Operator(s): CSX, Amtrak

Technical
- Number of tracks: 2-3
- Track gauge: 4 ft 8 1/2 in (1,435 mm) standard gauge

The Syracuse Terminal Subdivision is a railroad line owned by CSX Transportation in the U.S. state of New York. The line runs from Oneida, New York, at its east end where it continues from the Mohawk Subdivision to Solvay, New York, at its west end where it continues as the Rochester Subdivision. In Syracuse, New York, (just north of the Destiny USA mall) the St. Lawrence Subdivision begins its run north.

== History ==
On January 24, 2011 at 0930 hours the Syracuse Terminal Subdivision went into service. It took over the western half of the Mohawk Subdivision.

== See also ==
- List of CSX Transportation lines
