= Henderson Subdivision =

Railway line in Indiana, Kentucky, and Tennessee

The Henderson Subdivision is a railroad line owned by CSX Transportation in the U.S. states of Indiana, Kentucky, and Tennessee. The line runs from Evansville, Indiana, to Nashville, Tennessee, for a total of 144.5 miles (232.6 km). At its north end the line continues south from the Evansville Terminal Subdivision and at its south end it continues south as the Nashville Terminal Subdivision. The line also includes the Cut-Off Main, Morganfield Branch, MH&E Branch & River Branch.

== See also ==
- List of CSX Transportation lines
