= Belt Subdivision =

Railway line in New York

Overview
- Owner: CSX Transportation

History
- Opened: November 1, 1871

Technical
- Line length: 7.23 mi (11.64 km)
- Track gauge: 1,435 mm (4 ft 8 1/2 in) standard gauge

The Belt Subdivision is a railroad line owned by CSX Transportation in Buffalo, New York, U.S. The line connects the Buffalo Terminal Subdivision with the Niagara Subdivision. It was originally built by predecessors of the New York Central Railroad.

== History ==
The New York Central and Hudson River Railroad established the Junction Railroad on April 20, 1870, to build a new connecting line between its main line and the former Buffalo and Niagara Falls Railroad. The line opened for operation on November 1, 1871. The Junction Railroad was merged into the parent company on October 1, 1879.

Following the bankruptcy of Penn Central Transportation the line was conveyed to Conrail in 1976. It was assigned to CSX Transportation in the 1999 breakup of Conrail.

== Operation ==
The southern end of the line connects with the Buffalo Terminal Subdivision near the former Buffalo Central Terminal. It runs north and then west, connecting to the Niagara Subdivision in Black Rock, Buffalo.

== See also ==
- List of CSX Transportation lines
