= Hoosier Subdivision =

Railway line in Indiana

The Hoosier Subdivision was a railroad line owned by CSX Transportation in the U.S. state of Indiana. The line ran from New Albany, Indiana, to Bedford, Indiana, for a total of 72.2 miles. At its south end it continued north from Norfolk Southern and at its north end it came to an end; it formerly connected here with the Soo Line (ex-Milwaukee Road) and former Canadian Pacific branch from Terre Haute, Indiana. The Indiana Rail Road operated on the Hoosier Subdivision from the Milwaukee Road junction in Bedford to Louisville from 2006 until 2009. The Hoosier Subdivision was considered out of service by CSX but was rail banked in case of future revival. The last train ran between New Albany and Mitchell in 2009 but a small section in New Albany remained in service until 2016 to serve an industry until it closed.

On December 19, 2017, CSX Transportation filed with the Surface Transportation Board to abandon a 62.3-mile majority of the Hoosier Subdivision from Mile Post 00Q 314.0 in New Albany, Indiana, to milepost 00Q 251.7 in Bedford, Indiana. In 2023, CSX has removed the track from Mitchell to New Albany to eventually become a rail trail called Monon South Greenway.

== See also ==
- List of CSX Transportation lines
