= Memphis Subdivision =

Railway line in Tennessee

The Memphis Subdivision is a railroad line owned and operated by CSX Transportation in the U.S. state of Tennessee. The line runs from east of Bruceton west and southwest to Memphis, where it terminates at CSX Leewood Yard, mostly along a former Louisville and Nashville Railroad line from Nashville towards Louisville, Kentucky. (The part east of McKenzie was the main line of the Nashville, Chattanooga and St. Louis Railway.)

At its east end, at Lipe, the Bruceton Subdivision continues east towards Nashville. At its west end, at Leewood, the Memphis Terminal Subdivision continues through Memphis.
