= Louisville Terminal Subdivision =

Railway line in Kentucky

The Louisville Terminal Subdivision is a railroad line owned by CSX Transportation in the U.S. state of Kentucky. The line is located in Louisville, Kentucky, and links the LCL Subdivision to the north with the Main Line Subdivision to the south.

== See also ==
- List of CSX Transportation lines
