= Frankfort Secondary Subdivision =

Railway line in Indiana

The Frankfort Secondary Subdivision is a railroad line owned by CSX Transportation in the U.S. state of Indiana. The line runs from Clermont on the Crawfordsville Branch Subdivision north to Frankfort along a former Pennsylvania Railroad line.

== History ==
The Indianapolis and Frankfort Railroad (Ben Davis north to Frankfort) opened in 1918 as the last new main line railroad in Indiana, completing the PRR's route between Chicago and southern Indiana. The line passed through mergers and takeovers into Conrail; in the 1999 split of Conrail it was assigned to CSX. By this time, the line north of Clermont was the Frankfort Secondary, while the short piece from Clermont south to Ben Davis was part of the Crawfordsville Branch.
