= Rochester Subdivision =

Railway line in New York

Overview
- Status: Active
- Owner: CSX
- Locale: Rochester, Upstate New York
- Termini: Buffalo; Syracuse

Service
- Type: Freight, Inter-city rail
- System: CSX Transportation
- Operator(s): CSX, Amtrak

Technical
- Number of tracks: 2
- Track gauge: 4 ft 8 1/2 in (1,435 mm) standard gauge

The Rochester Subdivision is a railroad line owned by CSX Transportation in the U.S. state of New York. The line runs from Solvay, New York, west to Churchville, New York, along the former New York Central Railroad water level route. At its east end, west of downtown Syracuse, New York, the line continues west from the Syracuse Terminal Subdivision at Control Point (CP)-296. It intersects the West Shore Subdivision, which provides a southern bypass of Rochester, at Fairport (CP-359) and Churchville (CP-382). At its west end in Churchville the line becomes the Buffalo Terminal Subdivision.

Amtrak's Empire Service, Lake Shore Limited, and Maple Leaf operate over the entire Rochester Subdivision.

== History ==
The oldest part of the Rochester Subdivision is from Rochester southwest to Batavia, opened in 1837 by the Tonawanda Railroad. The portion of the line from Rochester east to Brighton was opened in 1841 by the Auburn and Rochester Railroad; the rest of the original route to Syracuse was less direct than the current line. The two lines were connected in Rochester in 1844. The Buffalo and Rochester Railroad was built from Depew east to Batavia in 1852, replacing the old, longer route via Attica. In 1853, the New York Central Railroad built a more direct route from Syracuse to Rochester, meeting the old route east of Rochester at Brighton. Most of the line once had four tracks, and, while much of the railbed is still wide enough to support such infrastructure, only two tracks are currently in service. The entire line became part of the New York Central Railroad and Conrail through leases, mergers and takeovers, and was assigned to CSX Transportation in the 1999 breakup of Conrail.

In the 1850s, New York Central Railroad took over the line in an effort to build new direct routes. The railroad built signal bridges along the line to increase safety and capacity. Currently, all New York Central Railroad signals along the subdivision have been replaced by CSX Transportation with the newer Safetran signals.

== See also ==
- List of CSX Transportation lines
