= KD Subdivision =

Railway line in Kentucky and Tennessee

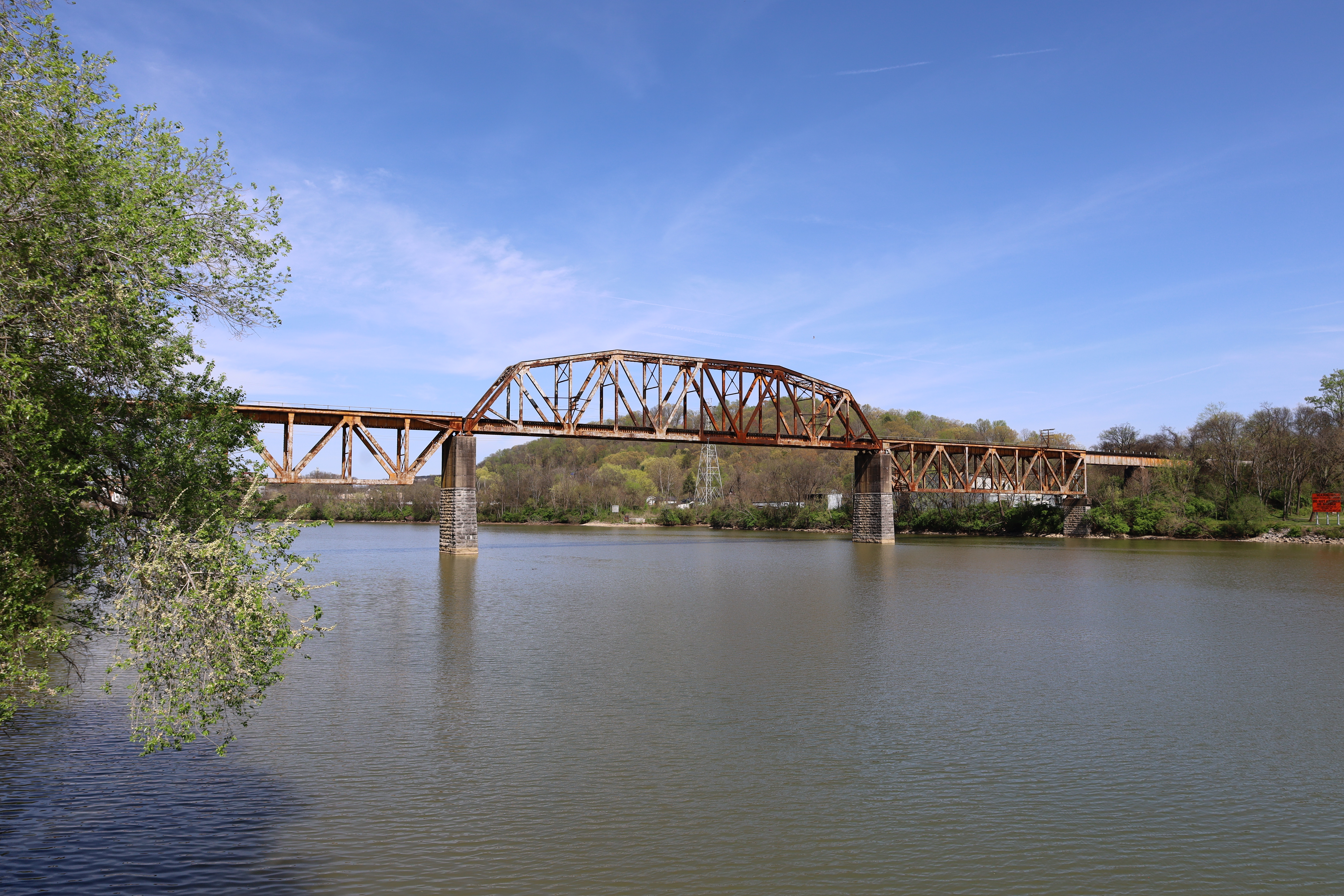
The KD Subdivision crossing the Tennessee River in Knoxville, Tennessee in 2025

The KD Subdivision is a railroad line owned by CSX Transportation in the U.S. states of Kentucky and Tennessee. The line runs from Corbin, Kentucky, to Etowah, Tennessee, for a total of 161.4 miles (259.7 km). At its north end it continues as the Corbin Terminal Subdivision, and at its south end it continues as the Etowah Subdivision.

== History ==
The oldest part of the KD Subdivision is the section between Corbin, Kentucky, and Jellico, Tennessee, which was completed in 1883 by the Louisville and Nashville Railroad. At Jellico, the line connected with the East Tennessee, Virginia and Georgia Railroad. Beginning in the late 1880s, the L&N began extending south from Jellico to create a new through route between Cincinnati, Ohio, and Atlanta, Georgia. The Knoxville Southern Railroad, organized in 1887, completed a line between Knoxville, Tennessee, and the Georgia border in 1890. The gap was closed in 1905 by the Knoxville, La Follette and Jellico Railroad, which completed a new line between Jellico to Knoxville.

== See also ==
- List of CSX Transportation lines
