= Olivet, Illinois =

Olivet
- CDP
- Location of Olivet within Illinois
- Coordinates: 39°56′46″N 87°38′23″W
- Country: United States
- State: Illinois
- County: Vermilion
- Township: Elwood

Area
  - Total: 2.383 sq mi (6.17 km^{2})
  - Land: 2.383 sq mi (6.17 km^{2})
  - Water: 0 sq mi (0 km^{2})
- Elevation: 673 ft (205 m)

Population (2010)
  - Total: 428
  - Density: 180/sq mi (69.3/km^{2})
- Time zone: UTC-6 (CST)
  - Summer (DST): UTC-5 (CDT)
- Area code: 217
- GNIS ID: 2628557

Olivet is a census-designated place in Elwood Township, Vermilion County, Illinois. As of the 2020 census, Olivet had a population of 336.

== Education ==
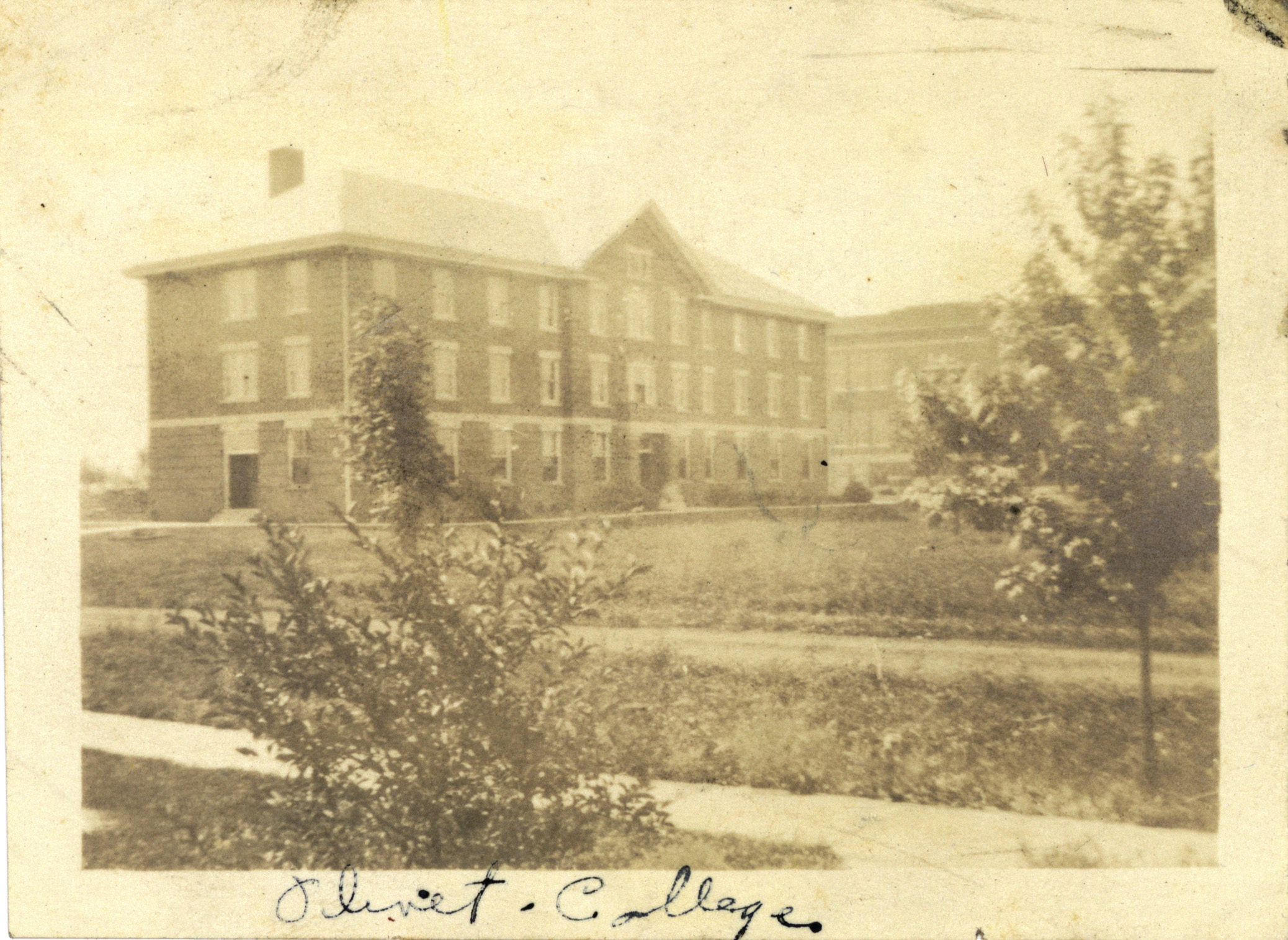
Olivet Nazarene College, Olivet Illinois

Illinois Holiness University was founded 1909 in Olivet, changing to Olivet College in 1923. The College left the campus in Olivet after a fire destroyed the main building in 1939. The school then moved to Bourbonnais and later became today's Olivet Nazarene University.

The remaining campus buildings were sold to the Missionaries of La Salette and housed a Catholic seminary that was later converted to a retreat center. When the retreat center was relocated, the campus was sold again and became the Notre Dame De La Salette Boys Academy.

== History ==
The town of Olivet was designed around the Nazarene school. The site for the school was purchased in 1908. By 1911, there were "About 16 houses with modern equipment."

== Education ==
It is within the Georgetown-Ridge Farm Consolidated Unit School District 4.
