= Marquette Rail =

Railroad in Michigan, US

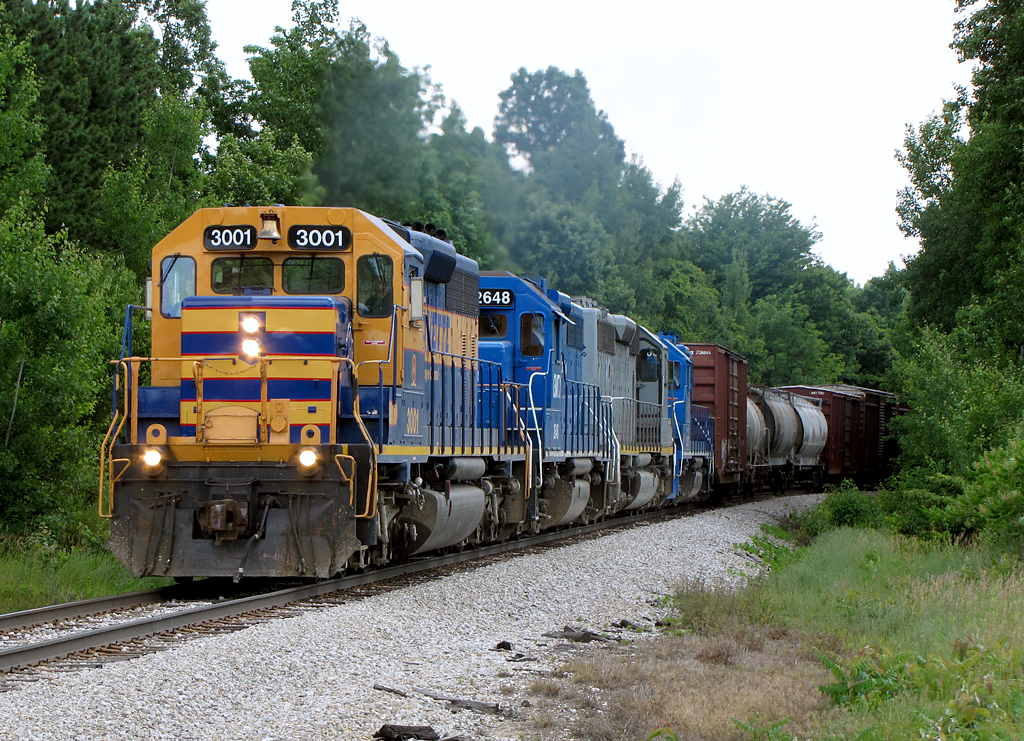
- MQT #3001, an EMD SD40-2, in Alpine Township, Michigan.

Overview
- Parent company: Genesee and Wyoming
- Headquarters: Ludington, Michigan
- Reporting mark: MQT
- Locale: Michigan
- Dates of operation: 2005–

Technical
- Track gauge: 4 ft 8 1/2 in (1,435 mm) standard gauge
- Length: 135 miles (217 km)

Other
- Website: https://www.gwrr.com/mqt/

Marquette Rail is a short line railroad operating in Michigan. It is based in Ludington and as of 2024, operates 135 miles (217 km) of trackage north from Grand Rapids, Michigan, where connections with CSX and Grand Rapids Eastern Railroad are located. It serves chemical, paper products and various general freight customers. In 2012, the railroad expected an annual profit of about $4 million on income of $13 million.

The company was founded in November 2005 by Kevin Ruble, a nationally active railroad consultant, who purchased a CSX line running north from Grand Rapids to Ludington and Manistee. The railroad maintains its trackage to 40 mph (64 km/h) standards, and operates, as of 2008, seven EMD GP38-2 and EMD SD40-2 locomotives.

On 8 February 2012, RailAmerica, a national short-line operator, announced that it planned to purchase Marquette Rail for $40 million. RailAmerica and Marquette Rail were subsequently purchased by Genesee & Wyoming. Prior to its acquisition, Marquette Rail was an employee-owned company.
