= CC Subdivision =

Railway line in Kentucky

Overview
- Service type: Freight rail
- Status: Active
- Locale: Northern Kentucky; Bluegrass region
- First service: late 1850s
- Current operator(s): CSX Transportation
- Former operator(s): Covington & Lexington Railroad; Kentucky Central Railroad; Louisville and Nashville Railroad

Route
- Termini: Taylor Mill, Kentucky, United States; Corbin, Kentucky, United States
- Distance travelled: 177.1 mi (285.0 km)

Technical
- Track gauge: 1,435 mm (4 ft 8 1/2 in)
- Operating speed: 10–60 mph (16–97 km/h)
- Track owner(s): CSX Transportation
- Timetable number(s): KC, C

The CC Subdivision is a railroad line owned by CSX Transportation in the U.S. State of Kentucky. The line runs from Taylor Mill, Kentucky, to Corbin, Kentucky, for a total of 177.1 miles (285.0 km). At its north end the line continues as a branch of the Cincinnati Terminal Subdivision, and at its south end it continues as the KD Subdivision of the Atlanta Division.

== History ==
What is today the CC Subdivision began in 1849, when a group under the name Covington & Lexington Railroad were chartered to build a railroad south of Covington, Kentucky. However, by 1853, only 20 miles (32 km) had been built due to financial difficulties. Despite this, progress was made, and by 1856, the railroad reached the Maysville and Lexington Railroad (now-Transkentucky Transportation Railroad) at Paris, Kentucky. In 1859, the Covington & Lexington and the Maysville & Lexington merged to create the Kentucky Central Railroad, after which the modern mileposts from Taylor Mill to Sinks are named. At one time, the KC also included a portion of rail between Lexington and Nicholasville, Kentucky. During the Civil War, the railroad played a major role ferrying Union supplies and soldiers south from Cincinnati through neutral Kentucky. In 1881, under new leadership controlled by Collis P. Huntington, plans were made to further extend the Kentucky Central to connect with the Louisville and Nashville Railroad at Sinks of Roundstone, Kentucky, just north of Livingston. The extension was completed in 1883, forming a complete connection from Covington to the L&N in eastern Kentucky. In 1890, the L&N purchased two-thirds of the stock in the Kentucky Central, and on September 22, 1891, would acquire the remaining shares. By this point, the Kentucky Central's total mileage sat at 217 miles directly owned.

Immediately south of Ford, the CC Subdivision crosses the Kentucky River. There have been a total of three crossings for the railroad at this location. The first was built in 1883. In 1907, it was replaced by a second bridge, with the original structure being relocated to Ravenna, Kentucky to be used as a pedestrian bridge. The 1907 bridge still stands today albeit it abandoned.

The section of track between Livingston and East Bernstadt consists of a long series of steep grades, sharp curves, and tunnels known as Crooked Hill. Originally single-track, the Louisville and Nashville Railroad double-tracked the hill in 1908. In 1964, the original line was abandoned in favor of the newer 1908 alignment, returning the hill to single-track territory.

As of July 2021, CSX is in the process of removing the double-track at the south end of the subdivision near Corbin, Kentucky.

== See also ==
- List of CSX Transportation lines
