= Clearco, West Virginia =

Unincorporated community in West Virginia, United States

- Unincorporated community
- Location within West Virginia Location within the United States
- Coordinates: 38°05′36″N 80°34′09″W
- Country: United States
- State: West Virginia
- County: Greenbrier
- Elevation: 3,389 ft (1,033 m)
- Time zone: UTC-5 (Eastern (EST))
  - Summer (DST): UTC-4 (EDT)
- Area codes: 304 & 681
- GNIS feature ID: 1554145

Clearco is an unincorporated community and coal town in Greenbrier County, West Virginia, United States. Clearco is 8 miles (13 km) east-northeast of Quinwood.

The community's name is an amalgamation of Clear Creek Coal Company.
