= Lockport Subdivision =

Railway line in New York

Overview
- Headquarters: CSX Transportation
- Locale: Niagara County
- Predecessor: New York Central Railroad

Technical
- Track gauge: 4 ft 8 1/2 in (1,435 mm) standard gauge

The Lockport Subdivision is a railroad line owned by CSX Transportation in the U.S. state of New York. The line runs from Lockport west to a junction with the Niagara Subdivision east of Niagara Falls in Sanborn, New York along a former New York Central Railroad line. At its east end, it interchanges with the Falls Road Railroad and Somerset Railroad.

== History ==
The line opened in 1838 as part of the Lockport and Niagara Falls Railroad. It became part of the New York Central and Conrail through leases, mergers, and takeovers, and was assigned to CSX in the 1999 breakup of Conrail.

== See also ==
- List of CSX Transportation lines
