= S&NA South Subdivision =

Railway line in Alabama

The S&NA South Subdivision is a railroad line owned by CSX Transportation in the U.S. state of Alabama. The line runs from Birmingham, Alabama, to Montgomery, Alabama, for a total of 87.9 miles (141.5 km). At its north end it continues south from the Boyles Terminal Subdivision and at its south end it continues south as the M&M Subdivision.

== See also ==
- List of CSX Transportation lines
