= Somerset Railroad (New York) =

Railroad in Niagara County, New York

Overview
- Reporting mark: SOM
- Locale: New York
- Dates of operation: 1983–2021

Technical
- Track gauge: 4 ft 8 1/2 in (1,435 mm) standard gauge

The Somerset Railroad (reporting mark SOM) was a railroad that operated in Niagara County, New York. It was operated by CSX Transportation. The railroad was built with the primary objective of providing coal to the Kintigh Generating Station, also known as the Somerset Power Plant, a 675 megawatt coal-fired power plant located in Somerset, New York. The railroad was built in 1983 by the New York State Electric and Gas Co. using new and old rights of way. From Lockport, New York, it runs on the defunct International Railway Co. (IRC) interurban line opened in 1900 under the name Buffalo, Lockport & Olcott Beach (BL&OB) which became part of the IRC in 1902. From Newfane, New York, the SOM sweeps off the IRC (abandoned in 1937) to the Hojack Line in Appleton, New York (Township of Newfane, Niagara County, NY), to West Somerset in the Town of Somerset. It then swings off on new trackage to a series of spurs and a loop at the Kintigh Generating Station.

Although the Somerset Railroad owned 428 rotary-dump gondola cars, CSX provided their motive power and operated the railroad. Prior to the acquisition of Conrail by Norfolk Southern and CSX in 1998, Conrail provided motive power. The Somerset Railroad right of way includes 15.59 miles (25 km) of trackage, known as the Somerset Secondary. Unit coal trains leaving from Youngstown, Ohio, run to Erie, Pennsylvania, followed by Buffalo, then north to the Niagara Branch, where they swing off onto the Lockport Subdivision, and finally in Lockport onto the Somerset Secondary. Even though the Somerset Power Plant owned its own gondolas, CSXT Hoppers were a regular sight at the plant.

The coal cars were unloaded using a rotary car dumper at the power plant. Also on the line in Lockport is a chemical plant, Vanchlor, which receives Chlorine via the railroad. The first train on the line ran in November 1983. Power was provided by four Conrail GE B23-7s, with 1926 as the lead unit.

In March 2020, The New York Times reported that the Kintigh Generating Station would shut down. The Somerset plant closure was a direct result of Governor Andrew Cuomo's plan to reduce carbon emissions in New York state. Electricity for the area is now purchased and delivered from power plants in Pennsylvania. Shortly after the plant closure, that October CSX filed for abandonment of the line as the plant was the only customer. In late spring 2022, the line was torn up by CSX from just past the chemical plant spur all the way to the power plant. This was the second time the Hojack right of way was abandoned. Prior to line abandonment, all Somerset rail cars were collected by CSX and sent to scrap, with a few remaining in other mixed services.

== See also ==
- List of CSX Transportation lines
