= LCL Subdivision =

Railway line in Kentucky

Overview
- Service type: Freight rail
- Status: Active
- Locale: Northern Kentucky, north central Kentucky, Louisville metropolitan area
- First service: 1869
- Current operator: CSX Transportation
- Former operators: Louisville, Cincinnati and Lexington Railroad; Louisville, Cincinnati and Lexington Railway; Louisville and Nashville Railroad

Route
- Termini: Latonia, Covington, Kentucky, United States; Clifton, Louisville, Kentucky, United States
- Distance travelled: 101.4 mi (163.2 km)
- Service frequency: ~14 trains per day

Technical
- Track gauge: 1,435 mm (4 ft 8 1/2 in)
- Operating speed: 10–50 mph (16–80 km/h)
- Track owner: CSX Transportation
- Timetable number: 00T

The LCL Subdivision is a railroad line owned by CSX Transportation in the U.S. state of Kentucky. The line runs from Covington, Kentucky, to Louisville, Kentucky, for a total of 101.4 miles (163.2 km). At its north end the line continues as a branch of the Cincinnati Terminal Subdivision, and at its south end the line continues as the Louisville Terminal Subdivision. A notable feature of this line is a street running section in La Grange.

== See also ==
- List of CSX Transportation lines
