= Columbus and Ohio River Railroad =

Railroad in Ohio, United States

Columbus & Ohio River Railroad
- Map

Overview
- Headquarters: Coshocton, Ohio
- Reporting mark: CUOH

Technical
- Track gauge: 4 ft 8 1/2 in (1,435 mm) standard gauge
- Length: 243 mi (391 km)

Other
- Website: www.gwrr.com/cuoh/

The Columbus & Ohio River Railroad (reporting mark CUOH) is a railroad in the U.S. state of Ohio owned by Genesee & Wyoming Inc.

The main line, formerly part of the Pennsylvania Railroad's "Panhandle," was acquired from Conrail in 1992. It begins in Columbus along CSX Transportation and Norfolk Southern Railway tracks and stretches to Mingo Junction, Ohio near Steubenville on the Ohio River. It interchanges with CSX at Columbus, and Norfolk Southern at Columbus and Mingo Junction. The railroad also connects with Ohio Central Railroad in Coshocton, Ohio and Zanesville, Ohio. Ohio Central is also owned by Genesee & Wyoming. As of 2024, it operates 243 miles (391 km).

There are trackage rights in Columbus, Ohio on CSX to reach Parsons Yard, and Norfolk Southern to reach Watkins Yard.

In addition to the main line (known as the Pan Subdivision), five additional lines are part of the Columbus & Ohio River:

Neilston Line - Former PRR line used to reach Grogan Yard in Columbus.
Mount Vernon Subdivision - Former B&O line to Mount Vernon, Ohio.
Cambridge Subdivision - Former B&O line to Byesville, Ohio.
Cadiz Branch - Former PRR branch to Georgetown, Ohio.
Piney Fork Subdivision - Using Ohi-Rail trackage rights to North Apex, Ohio.

The company was acquired by Genesee & Wyoming in 2008 as part of its purchase of the Ohio Central Railroad System.

== Operations ==
There are many interchanges in BPRR. CSX and Norfolk Southern Railway have interchanges at Columbus, Ohio. Norfolk Southern Railway also has an interchange at Goulds, Ohio, Ohio Central Railroad System at Morgan Run, Ohio and Zanesville, Ohio, and Wheeling and Lake Erie Railway at Harmon, Ohio.

The railroad received a $750,000 grant from the Ohio Rail Development Commission in May 2023 to support additional tracks in Newark Yard, the primary yard on the CUOH system. The grant also supported conversion of two manually operated switches at the Ohio Central Railroad and Ohio Southern Railroad interchange in Zanesville.
