= Decatur & Eastern Illinois Railroad =

Overview
- Parent company: Watco
- Headquarters: Decatur, Illinois, USA
- Reporting mark: DREI
- Locale: Eastern Illinois & Western Indiana
- Dates of operation: September 9, 2018–present

Technical
- Track gauge: 4 ft 8 1/2 in (1,435 mm) (standard gauge)
- Length: 182 mi (293 km)

The Decatur & Eastern Illinois Railroad (reporting mark DREI) is a Class III American regional railroad that is a subsidiary of Watco operating in eastern Illinois and western Indiana.

In January 2018, CSX Transportation announced that it was seeking offers to buy the Decatur Subdivision and the Danville Secondary Subdivision as part of a system-wide sale of low-traffic routes, and in July, Watco, via the DREI, was identified as the winning bidder. Following regulatory approval from the Surface Transportation Board, the DREI began operations on September 9. Commodities on this route are primarily chemicals, plastics, soybeans, and corn.

The DREI operates three intersecting routes totaling 182 miles (293 km)—the former Decatur Subdivision between Montezuma, Indiana, and Decatur, Illinois, the former Danville Subdivision between Terre Haute, Indiana, and Olivet, Illinois, and the former Eastern Illinois Railroad trackage from North Metcalf, Illinois, to Neoga, Illinois. It interchanges traffic with CSX, the Norfolk Southern Railway, the Canadian National Railway and the Union Pacific Railroad. The railroad is headquartered in Decatur, Illinois.
