= Evansville Terminal Subdivision =

Railway line in Indiana

The Evansville Terminal Subdivision is a railroad line owned by CSX Transportation in Evansville, Indiana. The Evansville Terminal Subdivision comprises the City Yard (1.0 miles), Howell Yard (3.5 miles), Old Belt Main (2.8 miles), Old City Main (1.6 miles), Wansford Main (5.3 miles) and the Yankeetown Lead.

== See also ==
- List of CSX Transportation lines
