= Buffalo Terminal Subdivision =

Railway line in New York

Overview
- Status: Active
- Owner: CSX
- Locale: Buffalo

Service
- Type: Freight, Inter-city rail
- System: CSX Transportation
- Operator(s): CSX, Amtrak

Technical
- Number of tracks: 2-3
- Track gauge: 4 ft 8 1/2 in (1,435 mm) standard gauge

The Buffalo Terminal Subdivision is a railroad line owned by CSX Transportation in the U.S. State of New York. The line runs from Churchville, New York, to Hamburg, New York.

== History ==
It became part of New York Central and Conrail through leases, mergers and takeovers, and was assigned to CSX Transportation in the 1999 breakup of Conrail.

== See also ==
- List of CSX Transportation lines
