= Selkirk =

Selkirk may refer to:

== People ==
- Alexander Selkirk, Scottish castaway who formed the basis for the novel Robinson Crusoe by Daniel Defoe
- Selkirk (surname), surname origin, and list of people with the surname
- Earl of Selkirk, a title in the Peerage of Scotland
- James Douglas-Hamilton, Baron Selkirk of Douglas, Scottish politician and Life Peer, briefly 11th Earl of Selkirk
- Thomas Douglas, 5th Earl of Selkirk, Scottish philanthropist who sponsored immigrant settlements in Canada

== Places ==
- Selkirk Mountains, in British Columbia, Canada, the Idaho panhandle, and far eastern Washington State, United States

=== Canada ===
- Selkirk, Manitoba
- Selkirk (federal electoral district), a federal riding in Manitoba
- Selkirk (provincial electoral district), in Manitoba
- Selkirk, Ontario
- Fort Selkirk, Yukon

=== Chile ===
- Alejandro Selkirk Island, in the Juan Fernández Archipelago, Valparaíso Region, Chile

=== Scotland ===
- Selkirk, Scottish Borders, Scotland
- Selkirk (Parliament of Scotland constituency)
- Selkirkshire, Scotland

=== United States ===
- Selkirk, Kansas, an unincorporated community
- Selkirk, Missouri, a ghost town
- Selkirk, New York, an unincorporated hamlet in the town of Bethlehem
  - Selkirk Yard, a large freight railroad yardlocated in Selkirk, New York

== Animals ==
- Selkirk (horse), (1988–2013), a North American-bred, thoroughbred racehorse
- Selkirk Rex, a breed of cat which named from Selkirk Mountains

== Education ==
- Selkirk College, a community college in British Columbia
- Selkirk Secondary School, a high school in Kimberley, British Columbia

== Sports ==
- Selkirk F.C., a football club
- Selkirk RFC, a rugby club
- Winnipeg Selkirks, a former ice hockey team from Winnipeg, Canada, see List of ice hockey teams in Manitoba

== Transportation ==
- Selkirk (sternwheeler 1895)
- HMS Selkirk (J18)
- Selkirk hurdle, a freight train route in New York
- Selkirk locomotive, a type of steam locomotive

== Other uses ==
- Selkirk Communications, a defunct Canadian radio and television broadcasting company
- Selkirk Grace commonly recited before a Burns supper
- Selkirk transmitting station, near Selkirk, Scotland
- The animated movie 7 Sea Pirates, also known as "Selkirk, el verdadero Robinson Crusoe"
