= Hudson Valley Rail Trail =

Paved trail in Ulster County, New York

Coordinates: 41°43′24″N 73°58′11″W

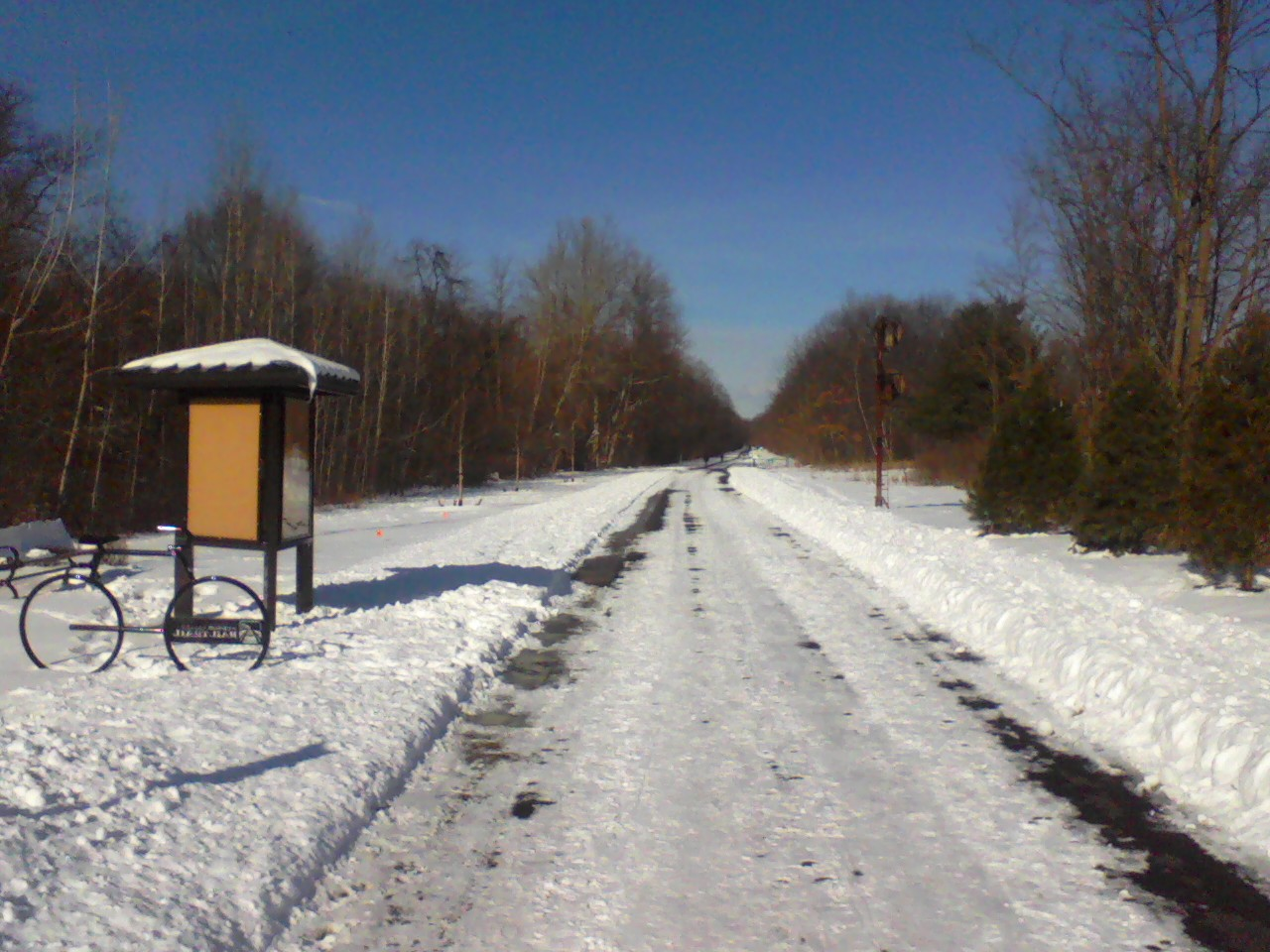
- The trail by the Commercial Avenue parking lot
- Length: 4 mi (6.4 km)
- Location: Lloyd, New York, US
- Trailheads: Haviland Road; Commercial Avenue; The Rotary pavilion; Tony Williams Park
- Use: Hiking, bicycling, horseback riding, roller blading, and cross country skiing.
- Sights: Poughkeepsie Bridge; Hudson River; Black Creek Wetlands Complex; Illinois Mountain; Tony Williams Park
- Website: hudsonvalleyrailtrails.org

The Hudson Valley Rail Trail is a paved 4-mile (6.4 km) east–west rail trail in the town of Lloyd in Ulster County, New York, United States, stretching from the Hudson River through the hamlet of Highland. The trail was originally part of the Poughkeepsie Bridge Route, a rail corridor that crossed the Hudson via the Poughkeepsie Bridge. Controlled by a variety of railroads throughout the 19th and 20th centuries, the bridge was damaged and became unusable after a May 8, 1974 fire. By the 1980s, the corridor's then-owner, Conrail, had routed all rail traffic in the region north through Selkirk Yard and was eager to relieve itself of the bridge and adjoining rights-of-way. In 1984, it sold the entire property for one dollar to a felon who did not maintain it or pay taxes on it. The section of the corridor west of the Hudson was seized by Ulster County in 1991 and transferred to the town of Lloyd.

During the 1990s, a broadband utility seeking to lay fiber optic cable paid the town to pass through the former corridor. The town used part of its payment to pave the route and open it as a public rail trail in 1997. The creation of the trail was supported by a local Rotary club, which built a pavilion along the trail. The pavilion includes a donated antique caboose. While the trail originally ended at Route 44–55, it was extended eastward between 2009 and 2010, intersecting Route 9W and continuing to the Poughkeepsie Bridge. The extension was paid for by stimulus funding.

The bridge, now a pedestrian walkway called Walkway Over the Hudson, connects the trail with the Dutchess Rail Trail to the east, creating a 30-mile (48 km) rail trail system that spans the Hudson.

The trail extends west along Route 299 to New Paltz, forming part of the Empire State Trail. As it passes through Highland, the trail is carried by several bridges, connects to four parking areas, and traverses a wetlands complex.

== History ==
=== Declining rail usage ===
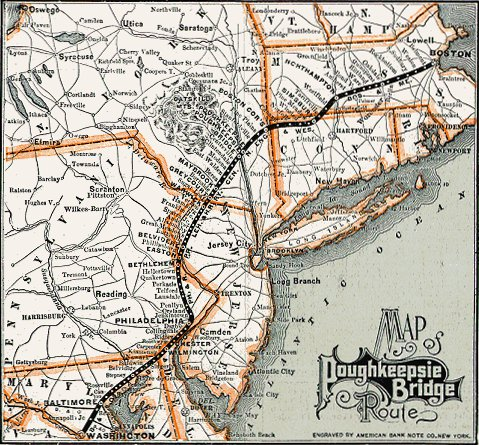
Map of the original Poughkeepsie Bridge Route from Boston to Washington, D.C., c. 1892

The Hudson Valley Rail Trail is part of the former rail corridor that comprised the Poughkeepsie Bridge Route. It ran east through the hamlet of Highland, in the town of Lloyd, over the Hudson River via the Poughkeepsie Bridge. Highland has historically been Lloyd's largest population center. The corridor was, throughout its history, operated by the Central New England, Philadelphia and Reading, New Haven, Erie, Ontario and Western, Lehigh and New England and Penn Central railroads. Under the ownership of Penn Central, traffic along the bridge route was discouraged in favor of a northern route through Selkirk; the use of newer technology at Selkirk Yard to improve efficiency was cited as the primary reason. At one point, the Poughkeepsie corridor had been the primary thoroughfare for freight being shipped to New England, and the New Haven yard at nearby Maybrook was once "the largest railroad yard east of the Mississippi River". Rail traffic over the Poughkeepsie Bridge stopped entirely after the bridge was damaged in a May 8, 1974 tie fire.

After Penn Central went bankrupt, Conrail assumed control of the corridor, but opposed renovating it due to budgetary concerns. Rail traffic up to the bridge continued until March 1982, when Conrail received permission from the Interstate Commerce Commission to completely cease using the corridor; the tracks were removed the following year. Donald L. Pevsner, a transportation lawyer from Florida, secured a first-refusal option for purchasing the corridor to create restaurants and tourist attractions, but allowed it to expire on November 1, 1984, because he could not secure financial backing; he claims that Conrail expressed a desire to sell the corridor, at that point a potential liability, to the "first warm body" that would buy it. Conrail immediately sold the Poughkeepsie Bridge and adjoining rights-of-way on November 2, 1984, for one dollar to Gordon Schreiber Miller, a convicted bank fraudster who "seemed uncertain what he wished to do" with the corridor. Miller did not pay taxes, fines or insurance on the corridor, or maintain it. He went bankrupt in 1990 and sold the corridor for one dollar to his friend Vito Moreno, who also did not pay taxes on it. In 1991, Ulster County seized the right-of-way west of the Poughkeepsie Bridge and gave over 5 miles (8.0 km) of the abandoned corridor to the town of Lloyd.

=== Conversion to trail ===
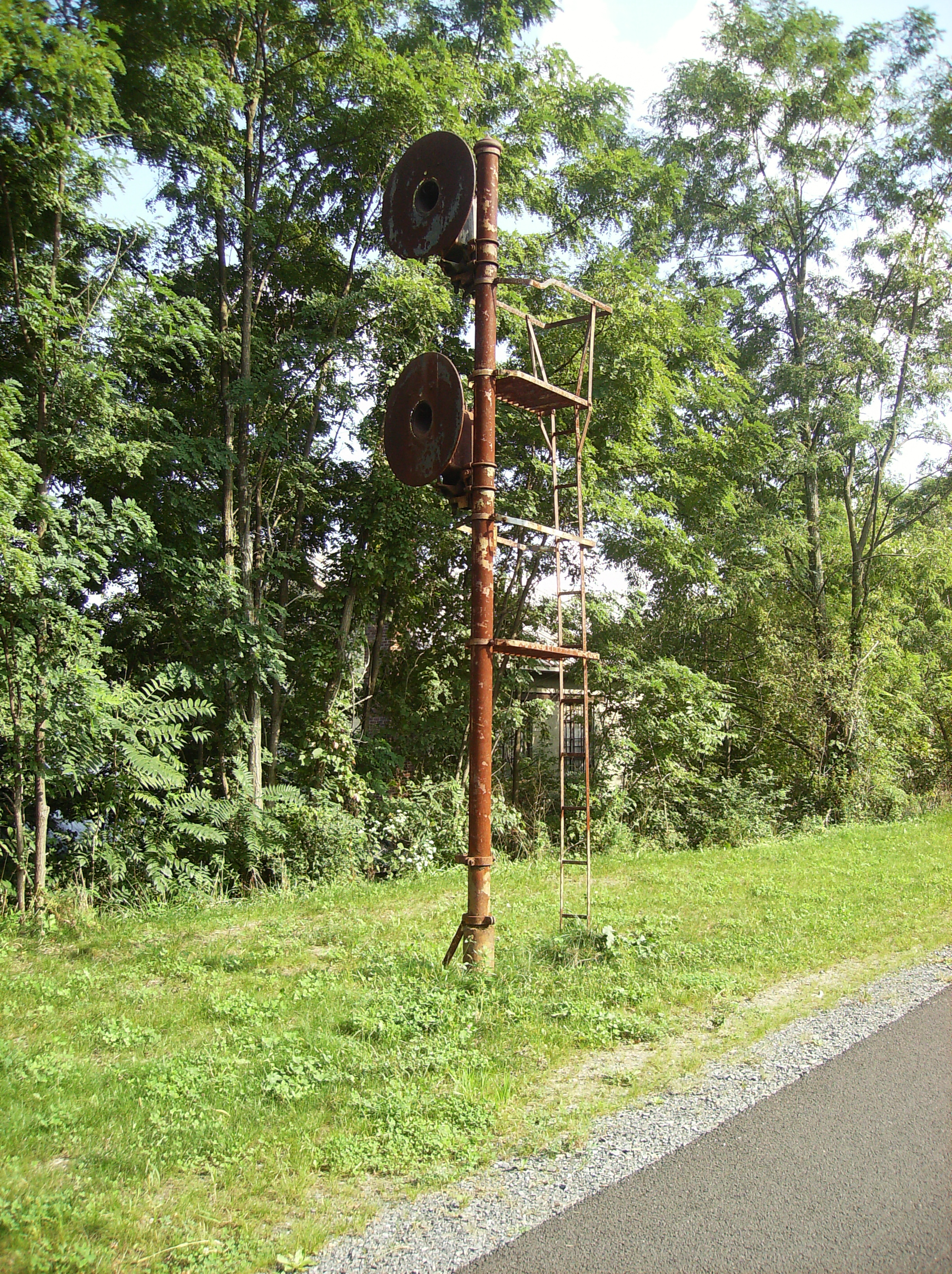
A defunct railway signal on the trail by Commercial Avenue

Parcels of the right-of-way between Lloyd and the neighboring town of New Paltz were sold-off by the county shortly before ownership of the remaining corridor was transferred to Lloyd and converted to a rail-trail. Roughly $400,000 in funding to convert the corridor to a trail was acquired through an easement from the town of Lloyd to a broadband utility for the laying of fiber optic cable, though only $70,000 was needed to pave the trail. The trail remains a right-of-way for the fiber optic line. The development of the trail was supported by Highland's Rotary club, which has since built several utilities for trail users, including a pavilion, garden and parking lot. The corridor was officially opened as a trail in 1997. Initially 2.5 to 3 miles (4.0 to 4.8 km) long, it stretched from Riverside Road in the west to Vineyard Avenue in the east; the removal of an overpass on Vineyard Avenue, as well as a blockage under a bridge on U.S. Route 9W, prevented the trail from continuing east to the Poughkeepsie Bridge.

Lloyd received a $224,000 state and federal grant in the summer of 2000 to create such a connection. Additional funding for the eastern extension was provided in November 2006, when the state granted $1.5 million to construct a bridge and a tunnel, and to complete the path. Lloyd received a $7,500 grant in 2002 to extend the trail west to the Black Creek Wetlands Complex; the town received an additional grant for $20,000 in May , 2005 to complete the Black Creek extension.

In 2006, a local businessman donated an antique caboose to the trail Association; this was placed beside the pavilion. Built in 1915, it was "one of ... the first cabooses made of steel instead of wood". An October 2007 study of paint chips from the caboose found the paint contained lead. The study was released less than a week before a town supervisor election in Lloyd; one of the candidates, Ray Costantino, was president of the Hudson Valley Rail Trail Association, and one of the early proponents of the trail. He claimed that the timing of the study was politically-motivated. Costantino subsequently became town supervisor, and the caboose had its paint replaced and was repaired at a total cost of $4,500. A second caboose, dating from 1926, is located at the trail's parking lot on Haviland Road.

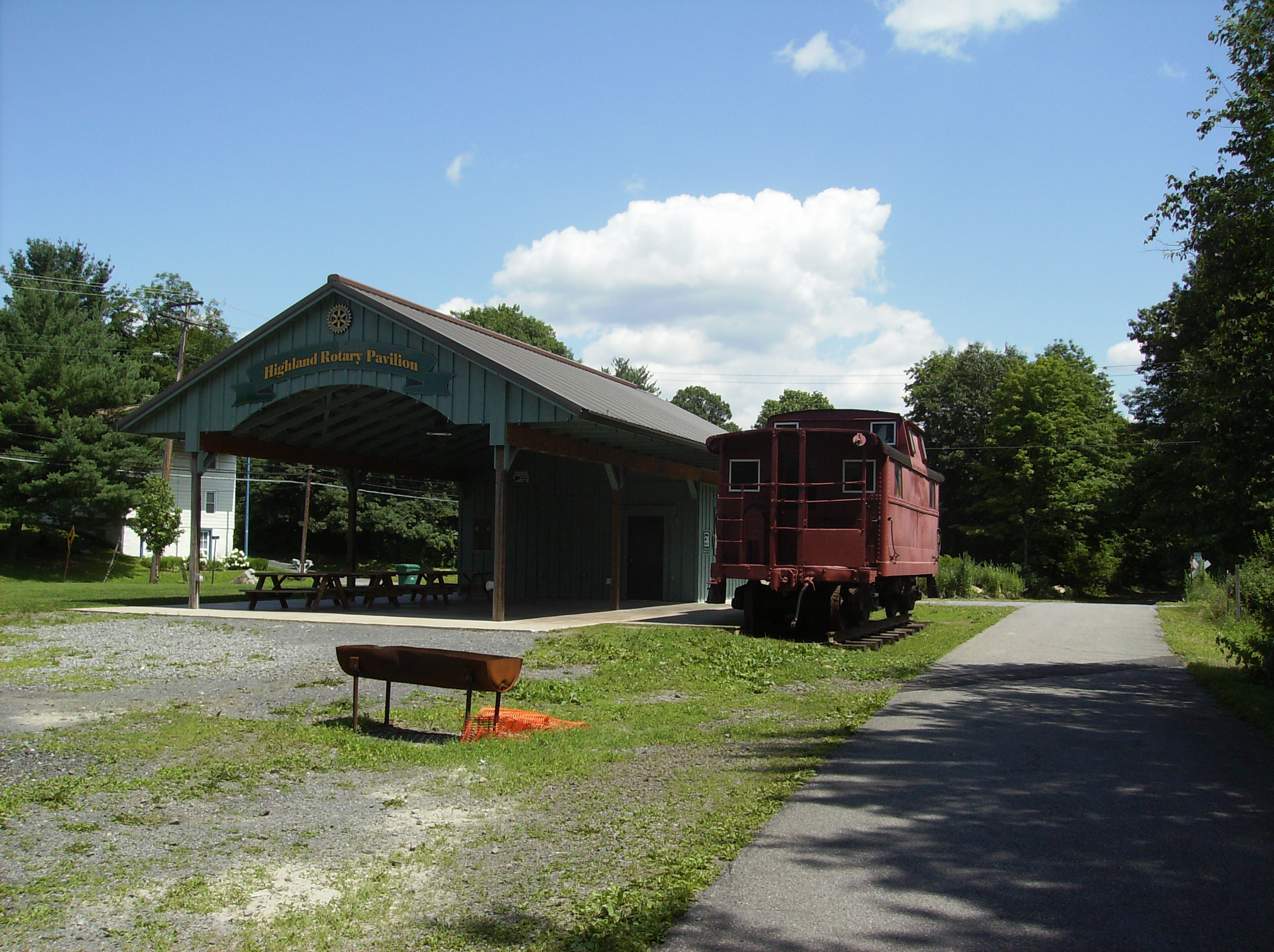
The rail trail's Rotary pavilion, with adjacent caboose

Lloyd's police department became the first in the county to purchase a Segway, in 2007, for the express purpose of patrolling the rail trail. The trail had been occasionally vandalized. Lloyd's Police Chief felt that use of such a vehicle would enable officers to patrol the trail for longer periods of time, and that it could also be used to patrol other areas of the town. Seven officers were expected to use the Segway, which contains an automated external defibrillator, and can go as fast as 12 1/2 miles per hour (20.1 km/h).

In March 2009, Ulster County received almost $21 million in stimulus funds. The funding included a $3.16 million project to complete the trail between Lloyd and the Poughkeepsie Bridge. Some funding for the architectural and engineering aspects of the project came from the reserve fund created after the town's fiber optic deal. The Rail Trail Association also received a $1,500 grant from a public-benefit corporation, the Hudson River Valley Greenway, to print brochures. Construction for the 1.28-mile (2.06 km) section was underway by that September. In March 2010, a portion of New Paltz Road was closed pending the replacement of a bridge over the trail.

The official groundbreaking ceremony took place on May 4, 2010, and the trail was expected to be completed by October. The bridge over Vineyard Avenue was opened to pedestrian traffic on July 16, 2010. The only remaining obstruction was the placement of a bridge carrying Mile Hill Road over the trail, which was expected to be completed in August. The crossing at US 9W had been remedied; the new section let "users to cross either over or under" the highway. To celebrate the opening of the Vineyard Avenue bridge, Route 44–55 throughout Highland (which includes Vineyard Avenue) was shut down for the day. The eastern expansion does not deviate from the original route of the corridor, and officially opened on October 2, 2010.

Between June 23 and 24, 2011, parts of the trail were spray-painted with "dozens of [...] words and images". Volunteers who removed some of the graffiti believed that different types of paint were used. Lloyd's highway superintendent noted similar vandalism elsewhere in the town, and Town Supervisor Ray Costantino stated that the incident would cause Lloyd residents to feel a personal connection to the trail and become outraged.

As part of the Empire State Trail project, the trail was extended 2 miles (3.2 km) to the west, ending just past the New York State Thruway in New Paltz. The state also constructed an on-road connection between the Hudson Valley Rail Trail and the Wallkill Valley Rail Trail. Prior to this construction, there has never been a direct link between the Poughkeepsie Bridge and the Wallkill Valley corridor. Other plans include the development of commercial zones along the trail, and a project to connect the trail to Illinois Mountain.

== Route ==
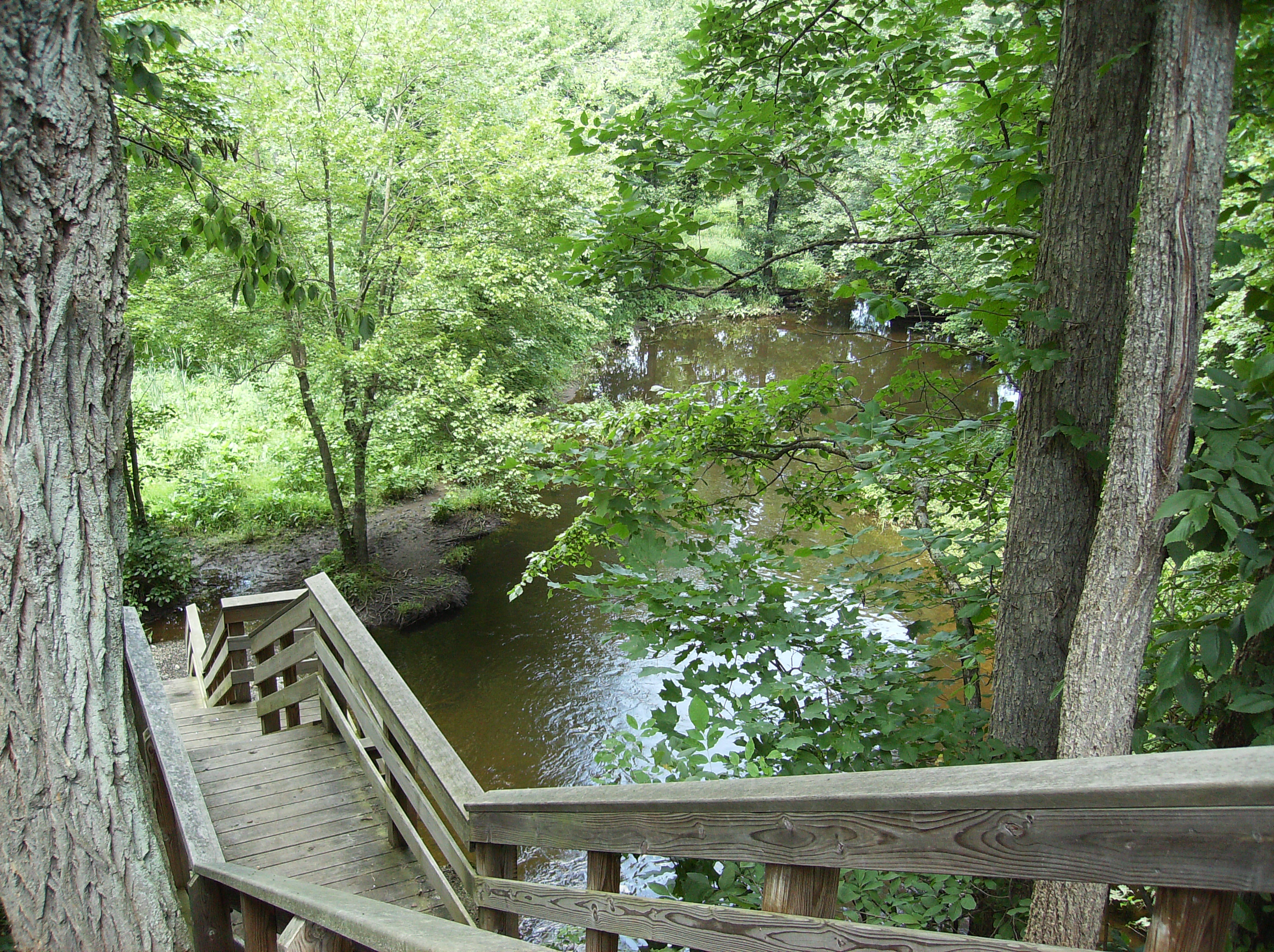
The Black Creek Wetlands Complex, accessible from the trail via a staircase

The east–west trail begins at the Poughkeepsie Bridge, by Haviland Road. The 1.28-mile (2.06 km) Poughkeepsie Bridge was opened as a pedestrian walkway in 2009. The bridge is a National Recreation Trail, and connects to the Dutchess Rail Trail to the east, creating a contiguous 18.2-mile (29.3 km) rail trail system that spans both Ulster and Dutchess counties.

The Hudson Valley trail continues 0.5 miles (0.80 km) west from the Poughkeepsie Bridge to a bridge over Mile Hill Road, then another 0.1 miles (0.16 km) to a crossing at US 9W. At the 1-mile (1.6 km) mark, the trail reaches a bridge over Vineyard Avenue. About 1.5 miles (2.4 km) from the bridge, the trail crosses under New Paltz Road. Almost 0.5 miles (0.80 km) from this road, the trail reaches the Black Creek Wetlands Complex. Black Creek is one of the two "principal streams" to run through Lloyd; it bisects the town as it flows north and pools in a pond. The wetlands complex itself is important for water drainage. Part of New York State Department of Environmental Conservation region 3, the complex contains Plutarch Swamp and one of the region's largest dwarf shrub bogs, hosting a variety of rare species. The complex also includes the Swarte Kill, Lloyd's second major waterway. The trail continues an additional 0.5-mile (0.80 km) past the beginning of the complex to Tony Williams Park.

The trail was extended about 2 miles (3.2 km) west as part of the Empire State Trail project. This section parallels New York State Route 299, ending just west of the New York State Thruway in New Paltz. On-road connections are available connecting the western terminus to the Wallkill Valley Rail Trail.

There are five parking areas along the trail, by Haviland Road, Commercial Avenue, the Rotary pavilion, at Tony Williams Park, and along Route 299 in Lloyd. The trail is 12 feet (3.7 m) wide and 4 miles (6.4 km) long; it is paved with asphalt and suitable for hiking, bicycling, horseback riding, roller blading, and cross country skiing.

In 2018, Hudson Valley law firm Mainetti & Mainetti, P.C. published an updated bicycle map that showed the proposed route of the Hudson Valley Rail Trail, and how it links the Walkill Valley Rail Trail and River-to-Ridge-Trail with the Dutchess County Rail Trail.

== See also ==
- List of rail trails in New York
- Rosendale trestle – another instance in which Conrail sold a bridge and adjoining rights-of-way for one dollar

== Bibliography ==
- Adams, Arthur G. (1996). The Hudson River Guidebook (2nd ed.). Ramsey, NJ: Fordham University Press. ISBN 978-0-8232-1679-6.
- Mabee, Carleton (1995). Listen to the Whistle: An Anecdotal History of the Wallkill Valley Railroad. Fleishmanns, NY: Purple Mountain Press. ISBN 978-0-935796-69-8.
- Mabee, Carleton (2001). Bridging the Hudson: The Poughkeepsie Railroad Bridge and Its Connecting Rail Lines: A Many-Faceted History. Fleishmanns, NY: Purple Mountain Press. ISBN 978-1-930098-25-1.
- Penna, Craig Della; Sexton, Tom (2002). The Official Rails-to-Trails Conservancy Guidebook. Guilford, CT: Globe Pequot Press. ISBN 978-0-7627-0450-7.
- Sylvester, Nathaniel Bartlett (1880). History of Ulster County, New York, with Illustrations and Biographical Sketches of its Prominent Men and Pioneers: Part Second: History of the Towns of Ulster County. Philadelphia, PA: Everts & Peck. OCLC 2385957.
