= Poughkeepsie Bridge Route =

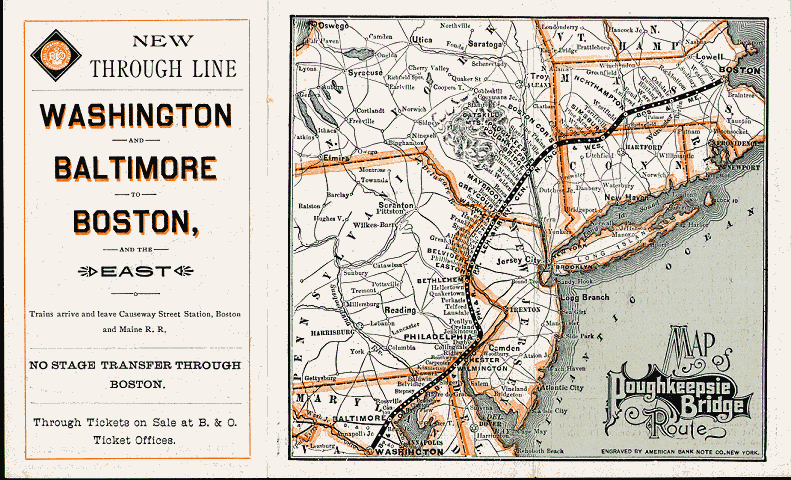
An advertisement for the route

The Poughkeepsie Bridge Route was a passenger train route from Washington, D.C. to Boston, Massachusetts, via Baltimore, Maryland and Philadelphia, Pennsylvania.

The route specifically avoided the Port of New York, due to the lack of a rail crossing of the North River (Hudson River). Instead it passed over the Poughkeepsie Bridge at Poughkeepsie, New York. Its Boston terminus was at North Station, an advantage allowing for a direct transfer to Boston and Maine Railroad lines to the north.

The Federal Express later used a similar route for several years in the 1910s, but ran via Trenton, New Jersey and New Haven, Connecticut.

The route used the following companies' lines:

- Baltimore and Ohio Railroad - Washington to Philadelphia
- Philadelphia and Reading Railroad - Philadelphia to Bethlehem, Pennsylvania (via the North Pennsylvania Railroad)
- Central Railroad of New Jersey - Bethlehem to Easton, Pennsylvania
- Lehigh and Hudson River Railway - Easton to Maybrook, New York
- Central New England and Western Railroad - Maybrook to Simsbury, Connecticut
- New York, New Haven and Hartford Railroad - Simsbury to Northampton, Massachusetts (via the New Haven and Northampton Company)
- Boston and Maine Railroad - Northampton to Boston (North Station) (via the former Central Massachusetts Railroad)

The route was used only from 1890 to 1893, after which operating patterns changed. The closure of the bridge to rail traffic after a May 8, 1974 tie fire eliminated the route and created the Selkirk hurdle.

Parts of the route near the Poughkeepsie Bridge over the Hudson River have been converted to rail trails; the Hudson Valley Rail Trail to the west, the Poughkeepsie Bridge itself, and the Dutchess Rail Trail to the east.
