= Schodack Subdivision =

Railway line in New York

Overview
- Status: Operational
- Owner: Amtrak
- Locale: Capital District
- Termini: Amtrak Hudson Line; Berkshire Subdivision / Castleton Subdivision

Service
- System: CSX Transportation

History
- Opened: 1924

Technical
- Line length: 7.1 miles (11.4 km)
- Number of tracks: 1
- Character: At-grade
- Track gauge: 4 ft 8 1/2 in (1,435 mm) standard gauge
- Operating speed: 40 miles per hour (64 km/h)

The Schodack Subdivision is a railroad line owned by CSX Transportation in the U.S. state of New York. The line runs from Stuyvesant north to Schodack along a former New York Central Railroad line. At its south end, it merges with the Hudson Subdivision; its north is at a junction with the Berkshire Subdivision, and the Castleton Subdivision at the east end of the Alfred H. Smith Memorial Bridge.

== History ==
The entire Schodack Subdivision was opened in 1924 by the Hudson River Connecting Railroad as part of a bypass around Albany. The line became part of the New York Central Railroad and Conrail through leases, mergers, and takeovers, and was assigned to CSX Transportation in the 1999 breakup of Conrail.

== See also ==
- List of CSX Transportation lines
