= A. H. Smith =

Notable people known as A. H. Smith include:

- A. Hyatt Smith (1814–1892), American politician
- Abby Hadassah Smith (1797–1879), American suffragist
- Albert Hugh Smith (1903–1967), English philologist
- Alfred Holland Smith (1863–1924), American railroad executive

== See also ==
- List of people with surname Smith
