= Berkshire Subdivision =

Railway line in Massachusetts and New York

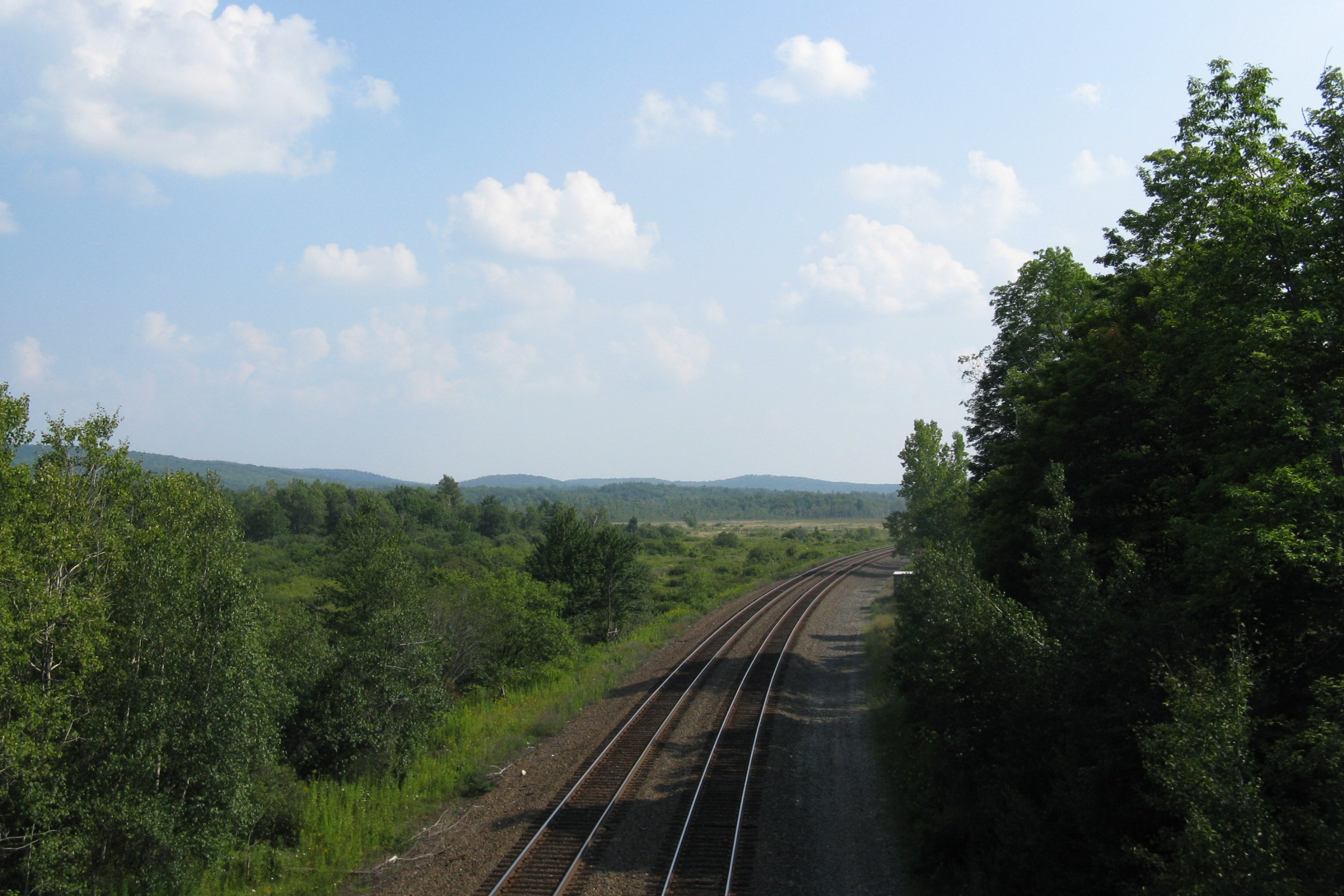
- Looking south from Route 8 in Hinsdale, Massachusetts

Overview
- Status: Operational
- Owner: CSX Transportation
- Locale: Berkshires
- Termini: Castleton Subdivision; Boston Subdivision
- Stations: 2

Service
- System: Amtrak; CSX Transportation
- Services: Berkshire Flyer, Lake Shore Limited

History
- Opened: 1839

Technical
- Line length: 99.9 miles (160.8 km)
- Number of tracks: 1-2
- Character: At-grade except one tunnel
- Track gauge: 4 ft 8 1/2 in (1,435 mm) standard gauge

The Berkshire Subdivision is a railroad line owned by CSX Transportation in the U.S. states of Massachusetts and New York. The line runs from near Springfield, Massachusetts west to Schodack, New York, (near Albany) along a former New York Central Railroad line. Its east end is in Wilbraham, east of Springfield, at the west end of the Boston Subdivision. Its west end is just east of the Alfred H. Smith Memorial Bridge, at a junction with the Castleton Subdivision and Schodack Subdivision. Along the way, the line junctions Amtrak's Post Road Branch (over which CSX has trackage rights) in Schodack.

Amtrak operates trains over the Berkshire Subdivision east of the junction with the Post Road Branch. The seasonal Berkshire Flyer runs as far as Pittsfield, while the Boston section of the long-distance Lake Shore Limited follows the line through to its eastern terminus.

== History ==
The Western Railroad opened east of Springfield in 1839, and from Springfield west to the New York state line in 1841. In 1842, the portion of the Boston-Albany line in New York was completed by the Albany and West Stockbridge Railroad. The Hudson River Connecting Railroad opened the piece of the current Berkshire Subdivision west of the Post Road Branch junction in 1924. The line became part of the Boston and Albany Railroad, New York Central, and Conrail through leases, mergers, and takeovers, and was assigned to CSX in the 1999 breakup of Conrail.

== See also ==
- List of CSX Transportation lines
