= Castleton Subdivision =

Railroad line in New York, United States

The Castleton Subdivision is a railroad line owned and operated by CSX Transportation in the U.S. state of New York. The line runs from Schodack northwest to Selkirk along a former New York Central Railroad line. At its southeast end, it junctions with the Berkshire Subdivision and Schodack Subdivision. After crossing the Hudson River on the Alfred H. Smith Memorial Bridge, it meets the River Subdivision and Port Subdivision at Selkirk and ends at Selkirk Yard, where the Selkirk Subdivision begins.

== History ==
The entire Castleton Subdivision was opened in 1924 by the Hudson River Connecting Railroad as part of a bypass around Albany. The line became part of the New York Central and Conrail through leases, mergers, and takeovers, and was assigned to CSX in the 1999 breakup of Conrail.

== See also ==
- List of CSX Transportation lines
