= Alfred Holland Smith =

American railroader (1863–1924)

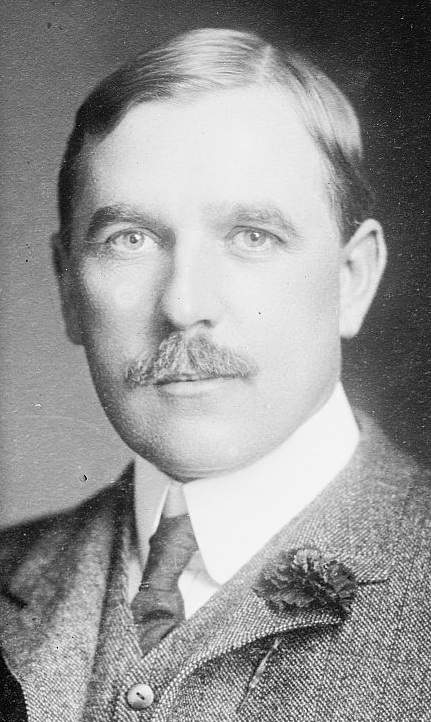
- Smith, c. 1910-1915
- Born: April 26, 1863; Cleveland, Ohio, U.S.
- Died: March 8, 1924 (aged 60); New York City, U.S.
- Employer: New York Central Railroad
- Title: President

Alfred Holland Smith (April 26, 1863 – March 8, 1924) was the President of New York Central Railroad from January 1914 to May 1918 and from June 1919 until his death. The entirety of Smith's forty-five-year career was dedicated to the railroads. He started his career as a messenger boy at the age of fourteen, earning 4 dollars a week, and became the highest-paid railroad manager in the U.S., receiving an annual salary of more than $100,000 according to one survey.

After the American entry into World War I, Smith joined the federal service as the Eastern Director of the United States Railroad Administration and temporarily assumed control over the largest pool of railroads in U.S. history, carrying one half of the nation's freight. He successfully alleviated traffic congestion and the buildup of Europe-bound cargoes in the docks.

Smith spoke and acted in favor of government-sponsored consolidation of American, Canadian and Cuban railroads into larger corporations but opposed direct nationalization of railroads. Smith's last full year with the New York Central Railroad, 1923, was the company's most successful year. On March 8, 1924, before the record profit numbers were published, Smith was killed in a horse riding accident in Central Park.

== Biography ==
=== Lake Shore and Michigan Southern ===
Smith was a fifth child in a family. Alfred was fourteen years old when his father died; instead of completing high school and going to college, he had to drop out of school and take care of himself. His first job, that of a messenger boy for the Lake Shore and Michigan Southern Railway offices in Cleveland, paid four dollars a week. Promotions within the office did not encourage him enough, and five years later Smith transferred to a railroad construction crew in Toledo, Ohio, area, paid $1.50 a day. The change from an office job to physical work was not easy for Smith, but he eventually developed "a physique which was the marvel of railroad men who learned their job only in the office." Later in life his associates noted that Smith "did not know the meaning of the word fatigue."

Smith's proficiency in both physical labor and clerical work led to his promotion to a foreman. In 1890, after eleven years with Lake Shore and Michigan, he became a superintendent for Kalamazoo, Michigan, division. He spent the 1890s supervising different construction teams of Lake Shore and Michigan, and in 1901 became the principal construction superintendent for the railroad, based in Cleveland.

=== Career in New York Central ===
In 1902 Smith transferred to New York Central & Hudson River Railroad (a division of New York Central Railroad) as General Superintendent. In the next year he became General Manager for this division. In 1912, after nine years of service and a few career moves Smith was appointed VP for New York Central Lines east and west of Buffalo. On January 1, 1914, Smith succeeded William C. Brown as the President of the company. His first reign as the President was marked by the reconstruction of the subordinate lines of New York Central and bringing these troubled lines to profitability.

=== Advisor to Canada ===
On July 13, 1916, Smith, Henry Lumley Drayton and William Mitchell Acworth were appointed to the Royal Commission formed by the Governor General of Canada to examine Canada's railway system. The three commissioners agreed on their assessment of preexisting conditions, that of excessive government aid and overdevelopment of railway lines that undermined their performance, but split on the future role of the government in reforming the system. Drayton and Acworth called for the nationalization of three principal Canadian railroads (Grand Trunk Railway, Grand Trunk Pacific Railway and Canadian Northern Railway) and argued that the expense of tax dollars was in the best interest of the Canadian nation. They insisted on separation of business from politics through an elaborate corporate government scheme.

Smith opposed nationalization. His 1917 minority report noted that no legal safeguard can prevent the parliament from changing its mind and taking direct control of the nationalized assets. Smith analyzed each railroad and found that each one had a healthy, profitable component. He advised stripping the railroads of redundant, loss-making lines through exchange or closure: "The scrap heap is frequently the most economical disposition available for inefficient plant and machinery." The role of the government, wrote Smith, must be limited to that of a regulator and a clearing house. Smith's plan, "in all probability, would have saved the country a great many millions of dollars" but the government of Canada settled for nationalization along the lines of Drayton-Acworth report.

=== Federal service ===
In the very end of 1917 William Gibbs McAdoo, head of the United States Railroad Administration, appointed Smith as assistant director for the north-eastern quadrant of the United States (east of Chicago and north of the Ohio and the Potomac rivers); in January 1918 Smith became Director of Eastern District of the Federal Railroad Administration. He did not formally resign as President of the New York Central until requested by McAdoo in May 1918. According to The New York Times, Smith had consolidated the largest pool of railroads in the United States history to this date, which carried over half of national freight tonnage over 80,000 miles of main lines.

In 1917 the railroad system faced a severe freight congestion, aggravated by shortage of coal and a streak of bad weather. Smith, as a federal administrator, had to untie the congestion that threatened to halt shipping in the Eastern states and resupply of the American Expeditionary Forces. Smith imposed a temporary embargo on new shipments, which reduced the pressure on the system. On the receiving end he imposed heavy demurrage penalties against idle cargoes that clogged rolling stock and marshalling yards. As a practical railroad man he persuaded the Federal Government to abolish its priority order system which, in his opinion, was the major contributor to congestion.

Another problem, that of Europe-bound ships waiting too long at the piers for their cargoes, was solved by a mandatory policy of forming unit trains and a takeover of private piers by federal authority. When the ice in New York Harbor put the system on the verge of collapse, Smith successfully persuaded the United States Navy to break all regulations and send its ships to clear the harbour. He dispatched harbor tugs to clear the Kill Van Kull, personally hired icebreaking steamer SS Florizel and guaranteed its insurance risks out of his own pocket.

=== Return to New York Central ===
On June 1, 1919, Smith was reelected President of the New York Central. His first job was to supervise transfer of assets from the federal government back to private ownership. During and after the Great Railroad Strike of 1922 he negotiated labor dispute directly with the unions, "virtually ignoring" the Railroad Labor Board, the intermediary whose actions provoked the strike.

Smith approved the improvements brought by the Transportation Act of 1920, but spoke against any further restriction by the government. He, however, welcomed the new plans to consolidate smaller railroads under control of New York Central and in the end of 1923 actually consolidated operations of the Lehigh Valley Railroad, the Erie Railroad and the New York, Ontario and Western Railway over the Belt Line 13 in New Jersey. A critical observer from The New Republic wrote about Smith's take on the federal effort to optimize the system: "Mr. Smith's ideas, boiled down, show a maximum of thought about New York Central and a minimum, and a very small one at that, about the consolidation scheme – whether it is sound or unsound, right or wrong." Smith the competitor was noted for his fierce rivalry with the Pennsylvania Railroad and for his business alliance with the Cleveland-based Van Sweringen brothers.

In the beginning of 1924 Smith spent several weeks in Cuba inspecting the Cuban railroads that were being consolidated into a single corporation under the Tarafa Bill. Smith was to be appointed chairman of the Board of the new Cuban company. His own railroad showed strong performance, and the 1923 turned out its best year ever. According to the annual report authored by Smith and released after his death, net income in 1923 increased by 120% compared to 1922. The gain was attributed to an increase in sales, mostly for freight transportation. Smith also elaborated on three investment projects: the proposed acquisition of the Central Railroad of New Jersey, the already one-half completed Castleton cut-off, and the future redevelopment of Manhattan's West Side Line in line with the 1923 Kaufman Act.

Smith's full-length portrait was painted by the Swiss-born American artist Adolfo Muller-Ury (1862–1947) together with that of his granddaughter Charlotte, a horse and dog, at the end of 1921 and early 1922, and was intended for an overmantel at his mansion at Chappaqua.

=== Death ===
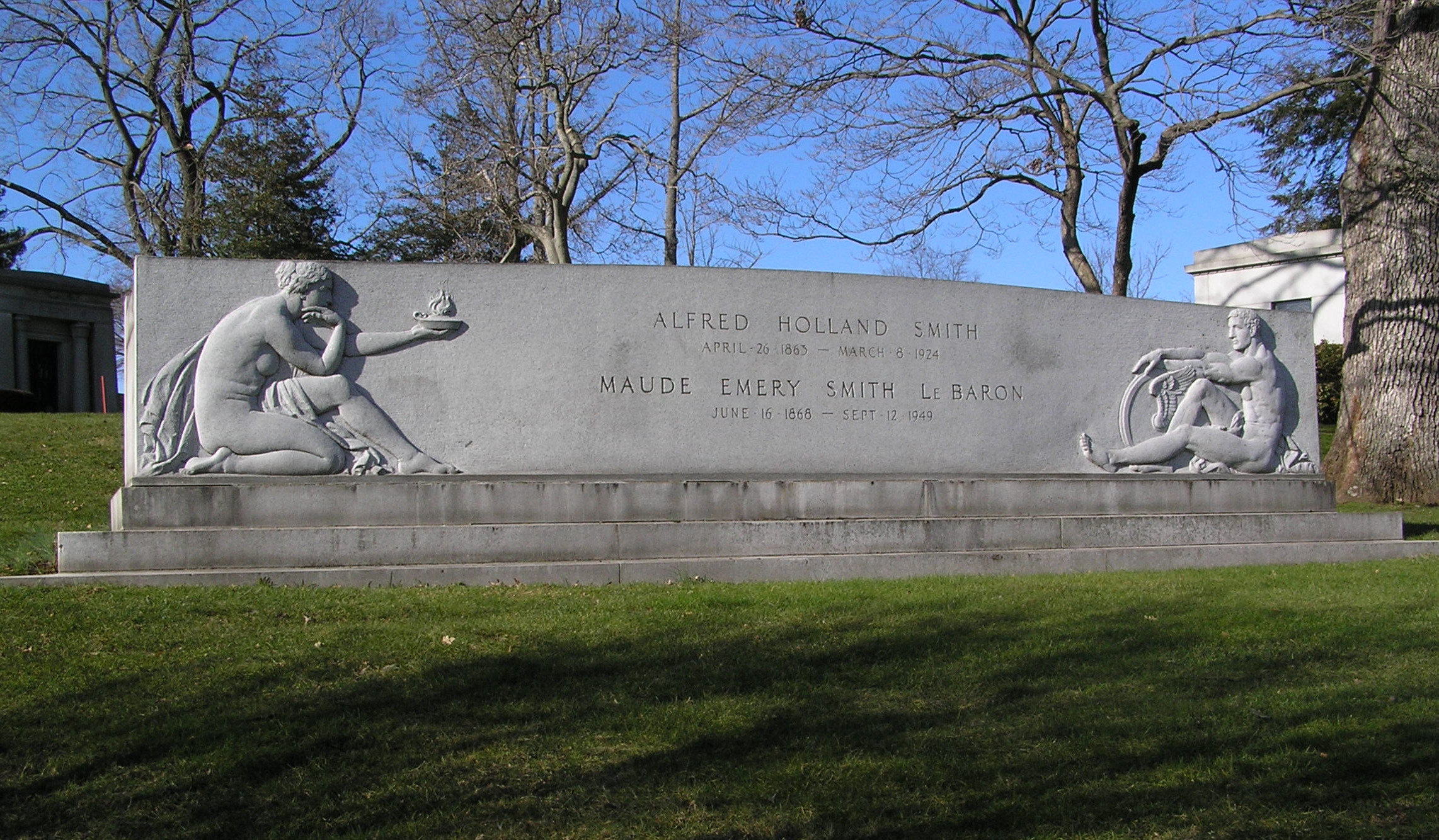
The gravesite of Alfred Holland Smith

According to the New York Times obituary, "horseback riding was Mr. Smiths's hobby and practically his only form of outdoor exercise ... He liked golf, tennis and baseball but did not have enough time" for these sports.

In the afternoon of March 8, 1924, Smith and his freight manager Edward Hoopes mounted their horses for a regular ride through Central Park. Both were expert riders and regular companions. They started from Smith's residence at the Plaza Hotel and rode together for more than two hours; Smith had already changed his mount. The two were riding near the 67th Street intersection when a woman on a horse crossed into their path. According to Hooper's testimony Smith pulled sharply on the reins, lost his balance, grabbed the horses's neck and fell on the ground head-on. The woman left the scene, her name remained unknown. Hoopes, unaware that the neck injury was fatal, rushed to Smith and screamed for help. Another woman volunteered to drive Smith to the Fifth Avenue Hospital. He was pronounced dead on arrival; the doctors believed that the death was instant or practically instant. Smith was survived by his widow and son Emory, who had a ten-year-old daughter.

Memorial services for Smith were held at his estate in Chappaqua and at the Saint Thomas Church on the 53rd Street. Police commissioner Enright, Smith's long-time friend, provided motorcycle escorts to the funeral motorcade. Smith was buried at the Kensico Cemetery in Valhalla, New York. The Alfred H. Smith Memorial Bridge between Castleton-on-Hudson and Selkirk, opened in 1924 after his death, is named for him.
