= Bethlehem Grange No. 137 =

Grange in New York

- U.S. National Register of Historic Places
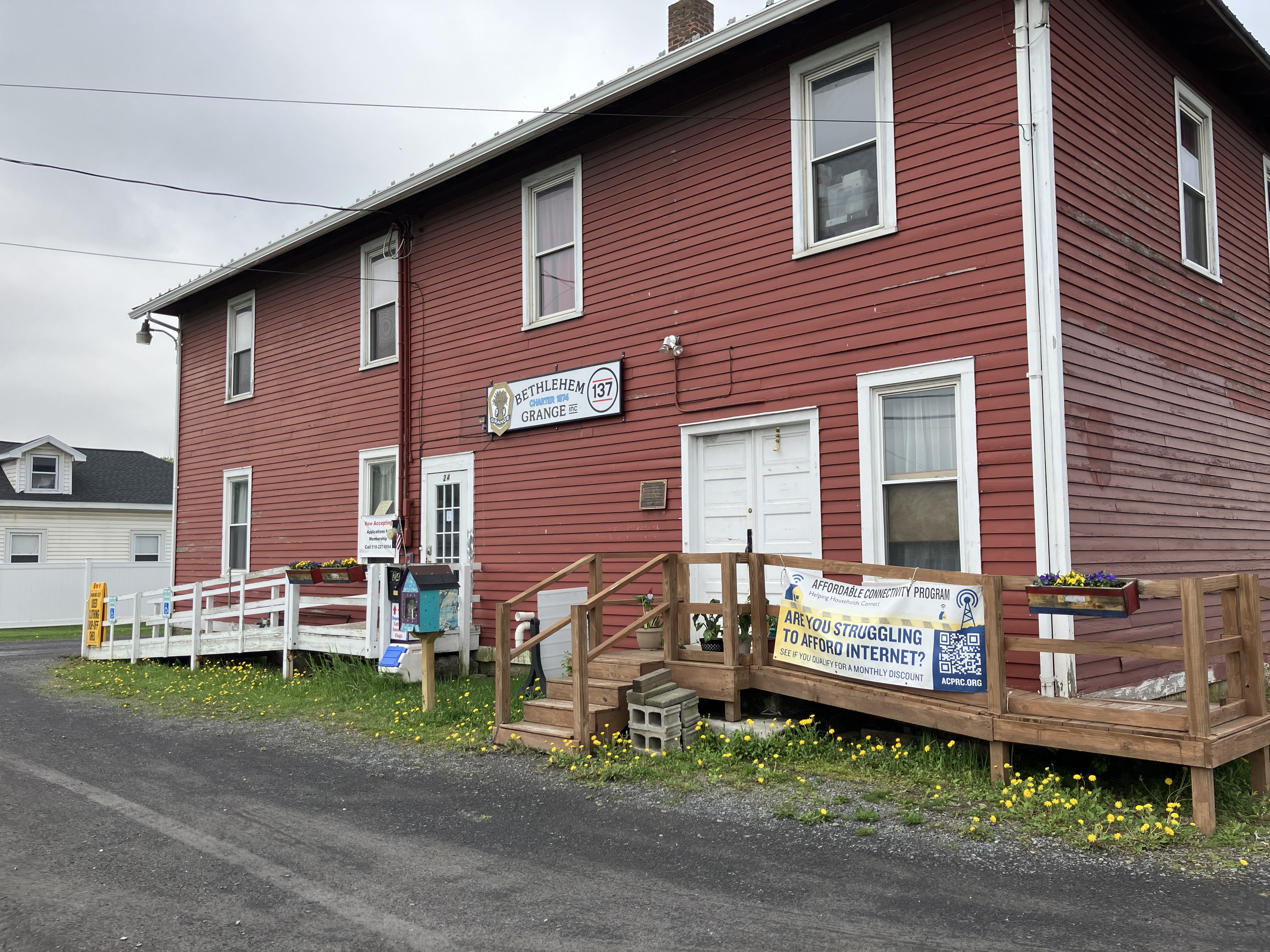
- Bethlehem Grange No. 137 in 2024

- Location within New York Location within the United States
- Location: 24 Bridge St. Selkirk, New York
- Coordinates: 42°32′54″N 73°48′38″W
- Area: less than one acre
- Built: 1921
- NRHP reference No.: 01001443
- Added to NRHP: January 11, 2002

The Bethlehem Grange No. 137 is a historic Grange hall located in Selkirk, Albany County, New York, United States. It was built in 1921 and expanded in 1936. This rectangular, wood-frame building is three bays wide, four bays long, two stories tall and has a medium-pitched hipped roof.

It was listed on the National Register of Historic Places in 2002.
