= Alfred E. Perlman =

American railroad executive

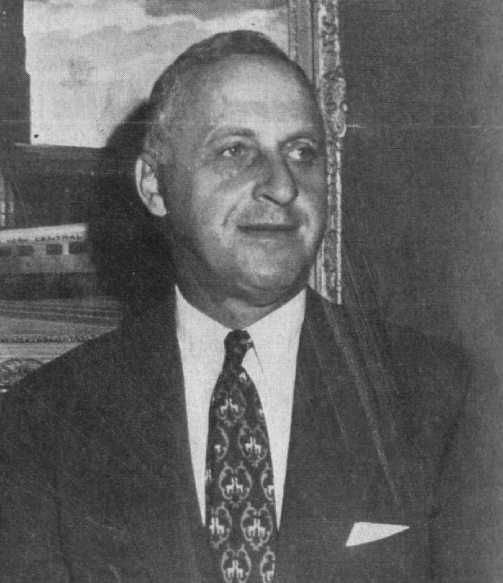
- Perlman in 1955
- Born: November 22, 1902; Saint Paul, Minnesota, U.S.
- Died: April 30, 1983 (aged 80); San Francisco, California, U.S.
- Occupation: Railroad executive
- Years active: 1948–1976
- Known for: Denver and Rio Grande Western Railroad, New York Central Railroad, Penn Central Railroad, Western Pacific Railroad
- Spouse: Adele Sylvia Emrich
- Children: Michael Louis; Lee Alfred; Constance

Alfred Edward Perlman (November 22, 1902—April 30, 1983) was a railroad executive, having served as president of the Penn Central Transportation Company and its predecessor, the New York Central Railroad, and later, president of the Western Pacific railroad presiding over its successful turnaround before being absorbed into the present day Union Pacific system.

== Early career ==
Perlman graduated from the Massachusetts Institute of Technology with a Bachelor of Science in civil engineering in 1923. He graduated from the Harvard Business School with a master's degree in railway transportation in 1931. He was awarded honorary degrees from Clarkson University and Depauw University.

According to a November 1960 write-up in Modern Railroads, Perlman never wanted to be anything but a railroader from the age of eight. While earning his degree at MIT, he worked summers on several railroads. Upon graduation, he joined the Northern Pacific Railway as a draftsman. After a year "He decided that the way to get to the top was to start at the bottom, and he worked eight months as a track laborer." In 1925, he was promoted to inspector of icing facilities on the Northern Pacific, with headquarters in St. Paul, Minnesota. A year later, he was named assistant superintendent, Bridges and Buildings, with headquarters on the railway's Yellowstone Division at Glendive, Montana. He was next promoted to roadmaster, serving at several points on the NP system. In 1930, the NP sent Perlman to Harvard Graduate School of Business Administration. Upon his return, he was appointed roadmaster at Staples, Minnesota. In 1934, he was named as an assistant on the staff of the Northern Pacific's Vice-President (Operations) Howard E. Stevens (Stevens himself was a trained civil engineer).

In 1934, during the depths of the Great Depression, Perlman was "borrowed" by the Reconstruction Finance Corporation as a consultant about financially-ailing railroads, including the Denver and Rio Grande Western.

Next, Perlman joined the Chicago, Burlington and Quincy Railroad as an assistant engineer in 1935, helping reconstruct lines in Colorado, Nebraska and Kansas damaged by heavy flooding.

Working on the Burlington in Colorado brought Perlman into close proximity with the Denver and Rio Grande Western Railroad, then struggling in receivership. Perlman joined the Rio Grande in 1936 as engineer-in-charge of maintenance-of-way work; in 1941, he was promoted to become chief engineer. In 1948, Perlman was general manager; from 1952 to 1954, executive vice-president. At the Rio Grande, Perlman enhanced his reputation as an operations expert with reforms that included off-track maintenance machines (today's highway/rail equipment), transitioning the road from labor-intensive steam locomotives to fuel-efficient diesel-electrics and the establishment of a research laboratory for what was then called "test-tube" railroading.

== New York Central and Penn Central ==
Modern Railroads noted that Perlman was invited in the spring of 1954 to come to the New York Central Railroad by its chairman, Robert R. Young, to modernize and streamline its properties as well as reorganize its personnel and operations. Young was the recent winner of a proxy fight to control the Central. Together, they worked on improving the Central's finances and reducing expenses. Young was considered a railroad visionary, but found the failing New York Central in worse shape than he had imagined. Unable to keep his promises, Young was forced to suspend dividend payments in January, 1958. Later that month, Young, who had a history of clinical depression, committed suicide in his Palm Beach, Florida mansion. Perlman assumed Young's leadership role with the Central.

For the next ten years, Perlman continued to work to strengthen and improve the Central in the face of ever-increasing air, automobile, sea and truck competition. Within six years, Perlman succeeded in reducing the Central's long-term debt by nearly $100 million; reduced its passenger-service deficit from $42 to $24.8 million; and by 1959 had increased earnings to $1.29 per share: double that of 1958. Perlman's attempts to create economically viable passenger traffic led to the famous Jet Train of 1966, when a Budd Rail Diesel Car M-497 was mated to a General Electric jet engine. Running in Ohio, it set a still-standing speed record of 183.85 miles per hour (295.88 km/h).

Commenting in 1962 on the integration of computerized networks on the Central, especially in the replacement of clerical duties and yard operations, Perlman said:

"Like many other industries, we are using data processing machines to replace routine, repetitive clerical work. In addition, we have automatic machine tools, which perform their work faster and more efficiently without human intervention. We have maintenance-of-way equipment, which performs many laborious, complicated and delicate operations automatically. We are, in short, like most of industry, automating simple control functions that require only low-level human judgment.

"Our electronic classification yards are one of the best examples of advanced cybernation at work in the railroad industry. For example, when a freight train leaves Toledo, Ohio, its consist is electronically stored in a memory system at Elkhart, Indiana, 100 miles away. When the train leaves Elkhart, it is pushed over a hump. When a freight car rolls down the hump, an analog computer goes to work to control the car's speed. The computer takes into account the car's weight, the kind of bearings, the condition of the lubricant in the journals, the direction and velocity of the wind, on which track the car must come to rest, how many curves it must go around to get there, and how far down that track it will be going before encountering another car. In the time it takes the car to move 150 feet down the incline, the computer has calculated the precise speed the car must leave the hump track in order to roll to its classification track and couple safely with the next car.

"Metal shoes, operated by electronic instructions from the computer, press against the car's wheels to retard it to the correct speed. A radar-scanning device between the rails determines when the car has been brought down to the calculated speed and then releases the retarders. All the while, the electronic memory system is opening and closing switches to route the car automatically to the proper track."

One of the largest yard projects was at Selkirk Yard, south of Albany, New York, built in 1924. Billed as a twenty million dollar undertaking c. 1966, the yard was rebuilt and automated, increasing capacity to handle 8,329 cars a day, up from 2,300. When completed in 1968, the Central spent $29 million, including $4 million for a diesel locomotive service facility. When opened, the rebuilt terminal was named the Alfred E. Perlman Yard.

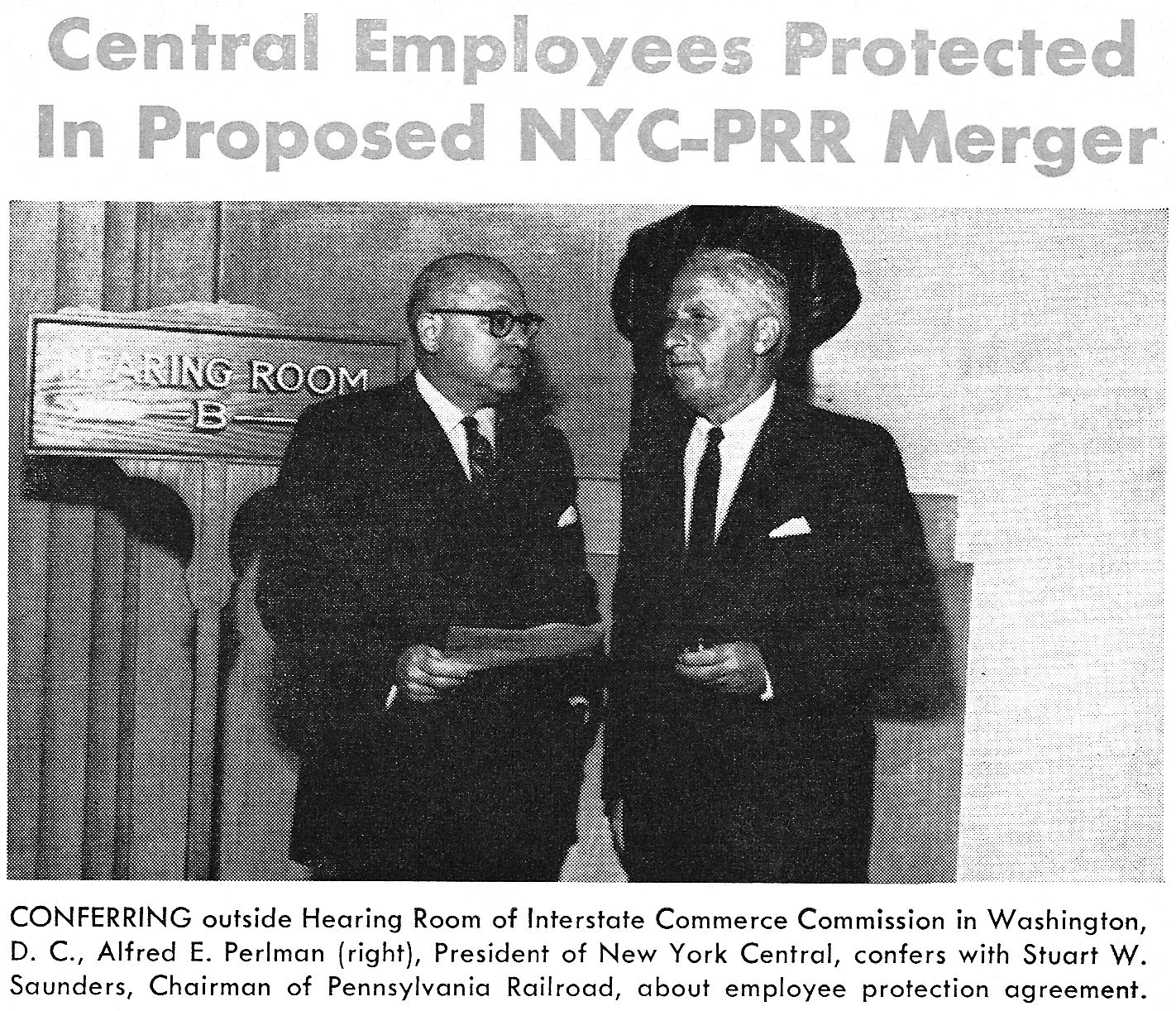
Conferring outside Hearing Room of Interstate Commerce Commission in Washington, D.C., Alfred E. Perlman (right), President of New York Central Railroad, confers with Stuart T. Saunders, Chairman of Pennsylvania Railroad, about employee protection agreement.

Perlman's modernization of the Central's physical plant also included paring down four-track main line routes to double track with centralized traffic control. On January 16, 1957, he was the first to push the button at the Erie, Pennsylvania, control center activating the world's longest stretch of electronically controlled railroad, at a cost of $6,238,460. Centralized traffic control enabled one operator each shift to control the trains between Erie and Cleveland, Ohio. while another operator each shift controlled train movement between Erie and Buffalo, New York. Crossovers were located an average of every seven miles. If a locomotive engineer missed a signal, the train would automatically stop, and could not be moved until the engineer complied with the signal indication. Even in blizzard conditions, the train dispatchers could start snow melters located miles away with the push of a button. Freight trains could be operated at 60 miles an hour and passenger trains could be operated at 79 miles an hour over the 163-mile stretch of double track. The two remaining segments of the former four-track Cleveland-Buffalo main line were reduced to two tracks starting in late 1957, saving the Central money in terms of both maintenance and taxes. With the opening of the Erie center in 1957, Perlman indicated that the Central's entire New York-Chicago main line would be operated under centralized traffic control by 1963, and the company was already installing centralized traffic control between Buffalo and Syracuse, New York. The final four-track portion of the entire NYC main line, the Hudson Division south of Albany, was double-tracked by late 1962.

As he had done on the Rio Grande, Perlman opened a railroad research laboratory on the Central at Cleveland, Ohio. Perlman also brought in a young crop of like-minded managers; according to Modern Railroads, his executive team was an average of 46 years old. Perlman said he considered developing good managers "The No. 1 responsibility of any chief executive officer . . . a machine is only as good as the man behind it."

Even as chief executive officer, Perlman was known to carry boots and denims in his business car. Among the business maxims Perlman is best remembered for is a comment which appeared in the New York Times on July 3, 1958. "After you've done a thing the same way for two years, look it over carefully. After five years, look at it with suspicion. And after ten years, throw it away and start all over." In 1960, with railroad deregulation under the Staggers Rail Act more than two decades away, Perlman was quoted as saying the railroad industry could solve its own problems "If we can be permitted as volume carriers to price our services competitively, based on costs."

Beginning February 1, 1968, Perlman was president, director, and chief administrative office of Penn Central Transportation (PC), the ill-fated merger of the New York Central with the Pennsylvania Railroad. Stuart T. Saunders, leader of the Pennsylvania for five years, was named chairman. Penn Central operated a system with 40,000 miles (64,000 km) of track in fourteen states and two Canadian provinces. It had total assets of $6.3 billion and annual revenues of nearly $2 billion. Within two years of merger, competition from trucking on the federally funded Interstate Highway System and the St. Lawrence Seaway, deindustrialization in the Northeast and Rust Belt, an economic downturn, strict regulation, heavy taxation, redundant trackage, outdated work rules, the inability to end money-losing passenger services and the forced 1969 integration of the financially disabled New York, New Haven and Hartford Railroad by the Interstate Commerce Commission, coupled with Penn Central's own bungled integration of the merged companies and mismanagement, resulted in the largest corporate bankruptcy in American history at the time. After Perlman's death, his son stated, "My father was Vice-Chairman of the Penn Central and has been quoted as saying that was not a merger, but a takeover."

== Western Pacific and retirement ==
Along with Stuart T. Saunders and David C. Bevan (both from the Pennsylvania), Perlman was dismissed from the Penn Central on June 8, 1970. Saunders, an attorney, returned to private practice having held onto his stock and suffered a personal loss of $700,000 (in 1970 dollars). Bevan was tried and acquitted for embezzling $4 million in Penn Central funds. Perlman, however, remained in railroading, and was hired to revitalize the Western Pacific Railroad. He served as president from December 1, 1970, to December 31, 1972, and chairman from 1970 until his retirement on June 24, 1976. Later that year, the Western Pacific was sold to a private investment group led by Perlman protégé Robert G. "Mike" Flannery. The Western Pacific was merged into the Union Pacific Railroad on January 1, 1983.

== Death ==
Perlman died on April 30, 1983, in San Francisco, California. He is remembered as one of Trains Magazine's ten most-prominent railroad presidents of the Twentieth Century.

== Other ==
In 1949, Perlman served as a consultant to the Railroad Administration Bureau of the South Korean Ministry of Transportation (the predecessor to Korean National Railway). The following year, he served as a consultant to the Israeli State Railways. Perlman was a member of the Transportation Association of America; American Museum of Immigration; University of Denver; Elmira College; Bay Area Council; Newcomen Society.

== See also ==
- List of railroad executives
