= Dr. John Babcock House =

Historic house in New York, United States

- U.S. National Register of Historic Places
- Location within New York Location within the United States
- Nearest city: Selkirk, New York
- Coordinates: 42°32′58″N 73°48′47″W
- Area: 10 acres (4.0 ha)
- Built: 1851
- Architectural style: Italianate, Greek Revival
- NRHP reference No.: 03001278
- Added to NRHP: December 10, 2003

Dr. John Babcock House is a historic home located at Becker's Corners, Selkirk in Albany County, New York.

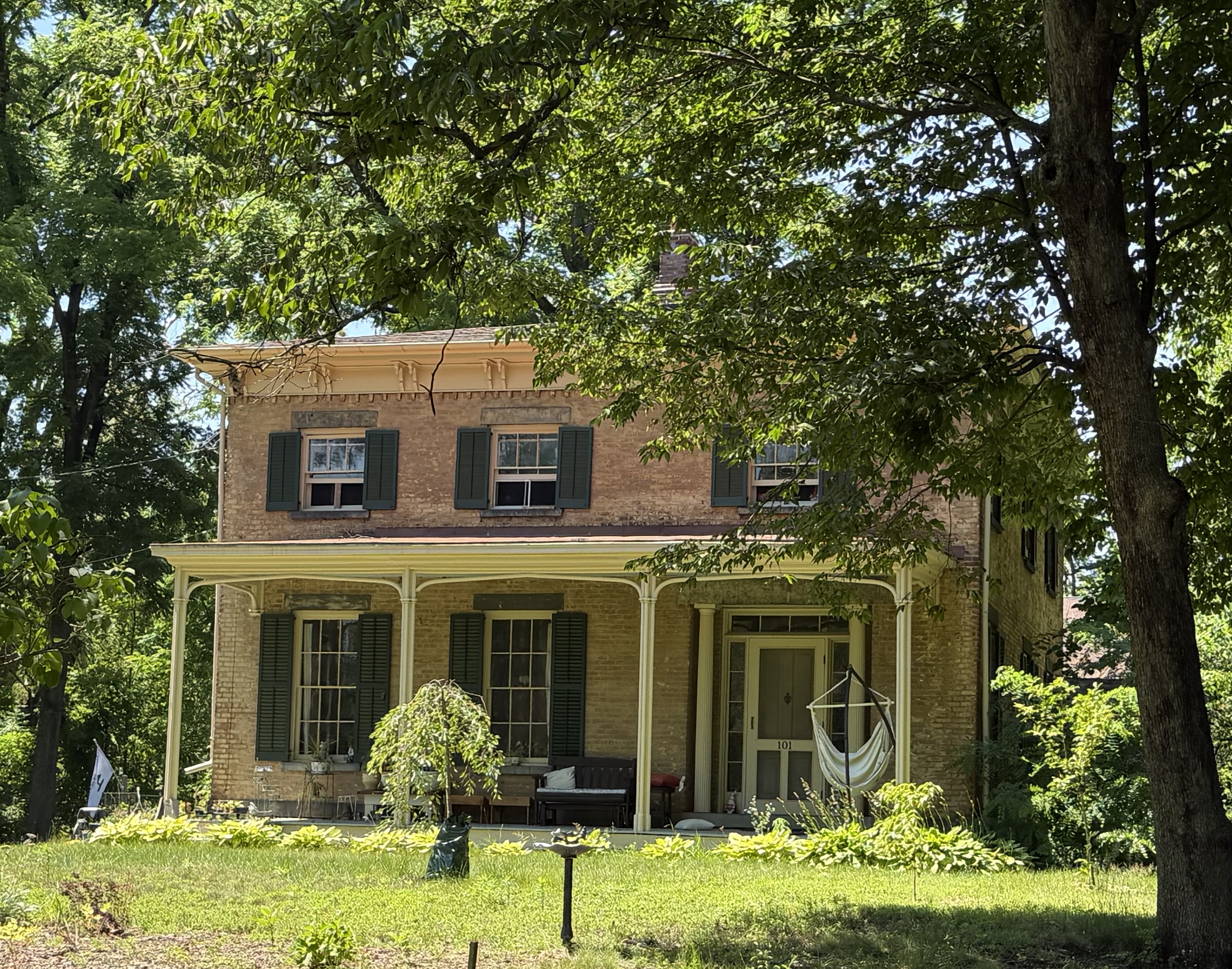
Dr John Babcock House in the Becker's Corners section of Selkirk NY

== Description and history ==
It was built in 1851 and consists of a three-by-three-bay, two-story red brick main block with a one-story summer kitchen addition. It represents a transitional Greek Revival/Italianate style. The main block has a hipped roof and sits on a limestone ashlar foundation. It has a modern for the time cistern, water collection tank, in the basement along with a fireplace which served as the winter kitchen. Behind the house is a barn dated 1840 used for livestock, horses and carriages. Dr. Babcock married Hester Vanderzee whose parents owed the abutting farm.

It was listed on the National Register of Historic Places on December 10, 2003.

In May 2023 the house was sold to its third family to own it since it was built.
