= Schoonmaker House =

Historic house in New York, United States

- U.S. National Register of Historic Places
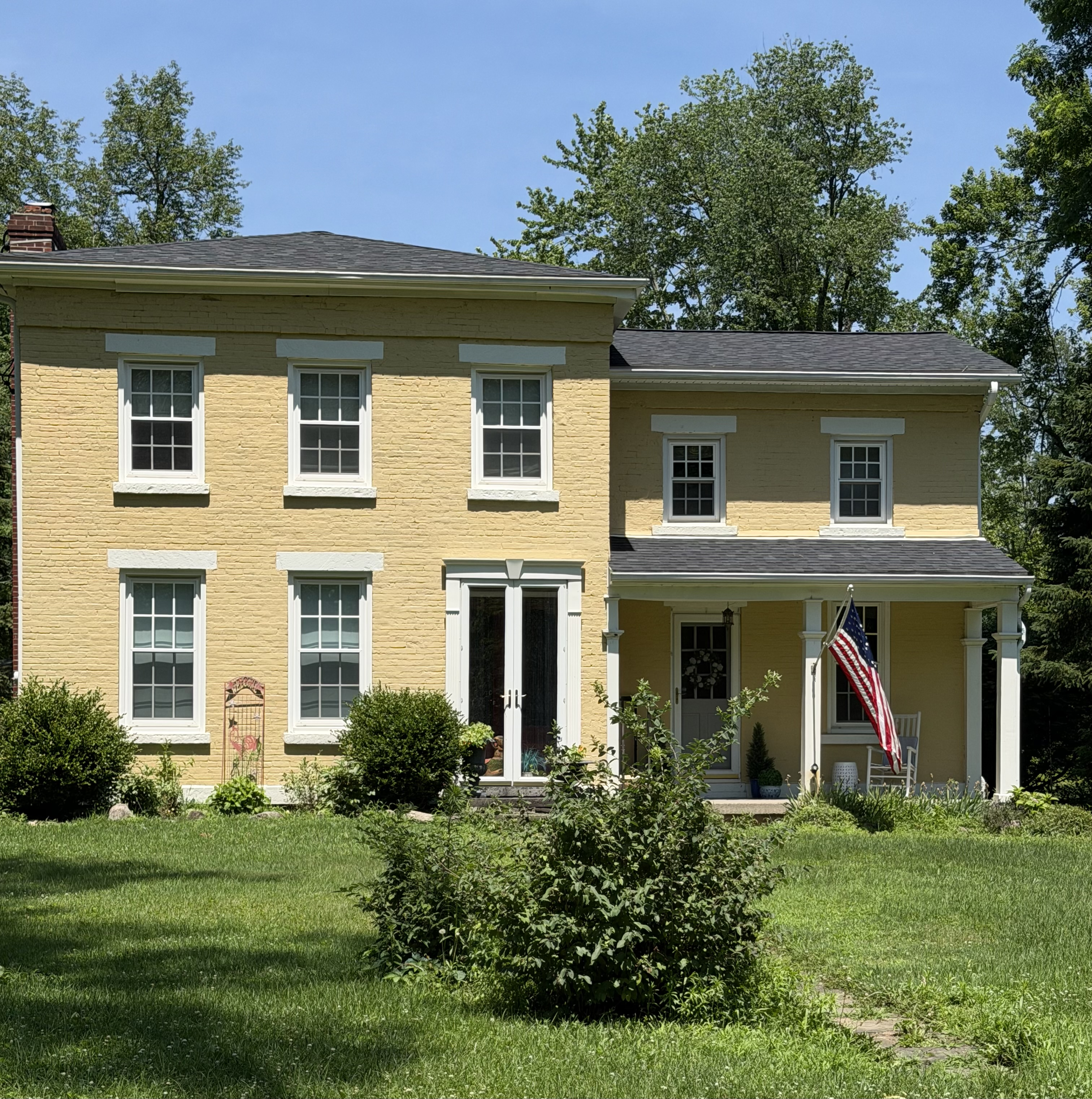

- Location within New York Location within the United States
- Location: 283 Beaver Dam Rd., Selkirk, New York
- Coordinates: 42°32′40″N 73°47′47″W
- Area: 4 acres (1.6 ha)
- Built: 1860
- Architectural style: Italianate
- NRHP reference No.: 01001396
- Added to NRHP: December 28, 2001

Schoonmaker House is a historic home located at Selkirk in Albany County, New York. It was built about 1860 and is a two-story brick farmhouse in the Italianate style. It consists of a two-story main block with a two-story brick east wing and one-story frame south wing.

It was listed on the National Register of Historic Places in 2001.
