= Selkirk (surname) =

Origin
- Language: Scots
- Meaning: "hall", "manor" + "church"
- Region of origin: Scotland

Other names
- Variant forms: Sailcirc; Shailcirc

Selkirk is a Scottish surname. The name is a habitational name, derived from Selkirk, located on the Scottish Borders. The place name is derived from the Middle English elements sale, sele, meaning "hall", "manor"; and kirk, meaning "church". The Scottish Gaelic form of the surname is Sailcirc (masculine), and Shailcirc (feminine).

== List of people with the surname ==
- Alexander Selkirk (1676–1721), a Scottish sailor who spent four years as a castaway when he was marooned on an uninhabited island; he is supposed to be inspiration for Daniel Defoe's Robinson Crusoe (1719)
- Andrew Selkirk (born ?), British archaeologist and magazine editor
- Elisabeth Selkirk (born 1945), American theoretical linguist
- George Selkirk (1908–1987), Canadian baseball player
- J. B. Selkirk (James Brown Selkirk; 1832–1904), Scottish poet and essayist
- Jamie Selkirk (born 1947), New Zealand film editor and producer
- John Selkirk (1782–1843), British songwriter
- Neil Selkirk (born 1947), British-born American photographer
- Patricia Margaret Selkirk (born 1942), Australian plant biologist and ecologist
- Rebecca Selkirk (born 1993), South African chess player
- Russell Selkirk (1905–1993), American politician
- Diane Selkirk (born 1967), Canadian journalist
