= Selkirk, Missouri =

Extinct hamlet in Missouri, U.S.

Coordinates: 36°43′26″N 89°27′17″W

Selkirk is an extinct town in New Madrid County, in the U.S. state of Missouri. The GNIS classifies it as a populated place.

Selkirk was laid out ca. 1905, taking its name from the Selkirk family, the original owners of the town site.
