= Selkirk hurdle =

Long freight rail route to New York City

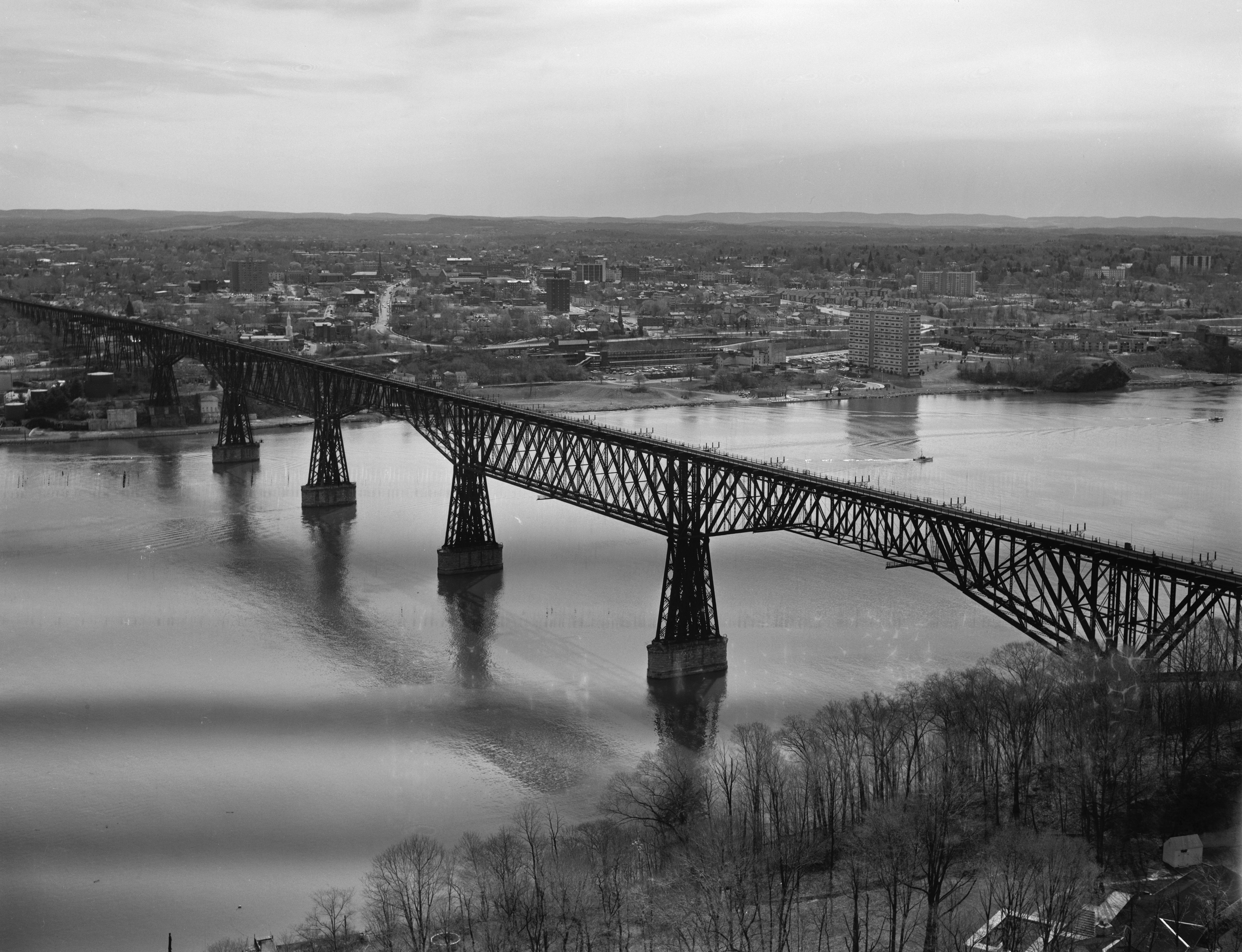
The Poughkeepsie Bridge ca. 1978. Its loss required an even longer detour for freight trains coming to New York City from the southwest.

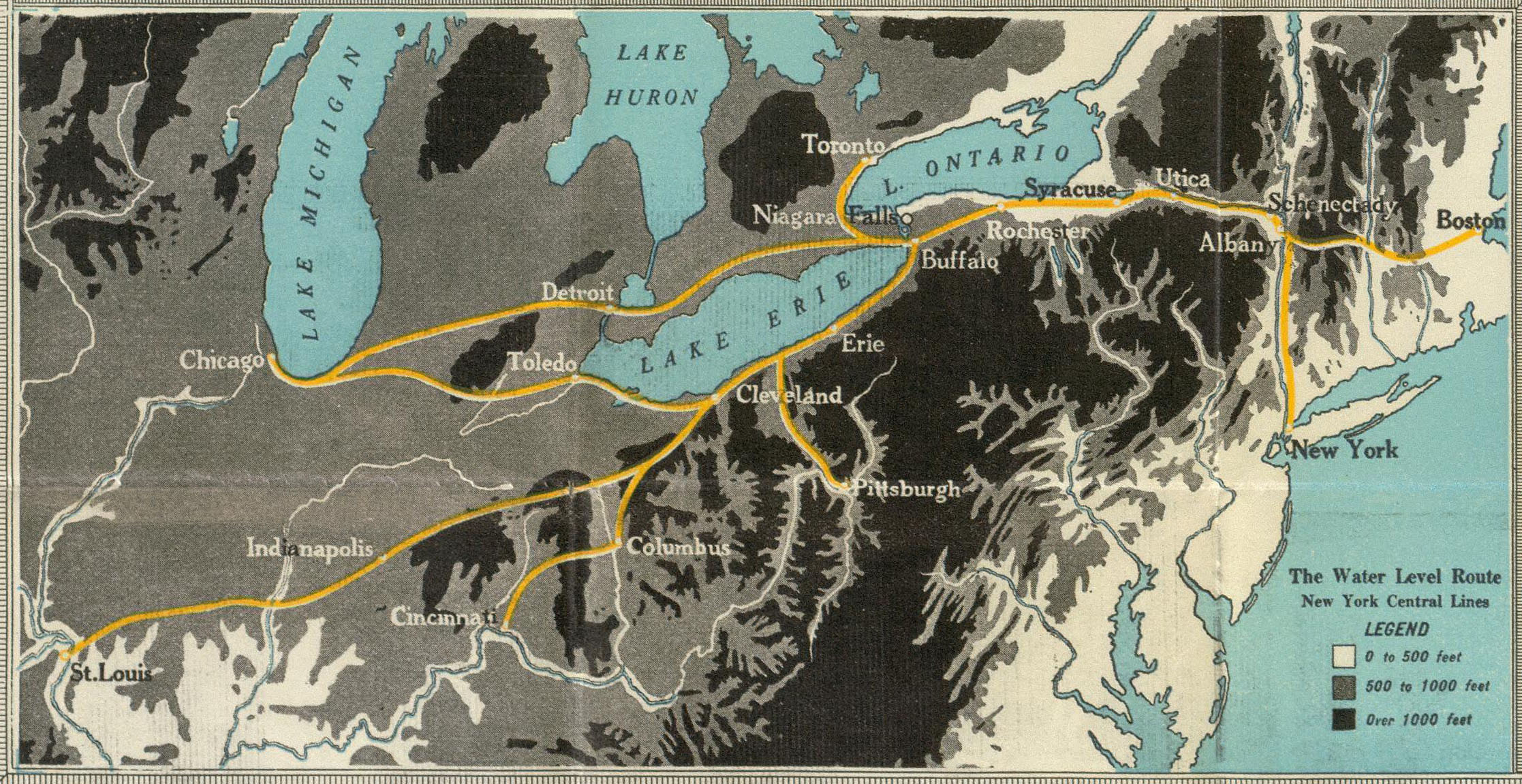
New York Central Railroad map from 1929 shows the Water Level Route avoids major elevation changes

The Selkirk Hurdle is the term used by urban planners, railroad employees, politicians, and others to describe the route that must be taken by freight trains traveling between New York City and other points in downstate New York that are east of the Hudson River, and locations in the United States to the south and west. There are no rail freight bridges or tunnels that cross the Hudson River south of Selkirk, which is 10 miles (16 km) south of Albany and the home of Selkirk Yard, a major CSX classification yard. As a result, trains from Long Island and New York City (except for the borough of Staten Island which can be reached via the Arthur Kill Vertical Lift Bridge ) must travel 140 miles (230 km) north to cross at Selkirk before continuing on their way. Advocates claim that this detour and the inefficiencies that result force New York City to rely more heavily on relatively-inefficient trucks than most parts of the United States, where freight trains are more common. However, at least for traffic to and from the west, this route was touted for its efficiency as the "Water Level Route" by the New York Central Railroad because trains using it did not have to climb over the Appalachian Mountains, and it is still used by the New York Central's successor, CSX, for traffic to both sides of the Hudson River.

To cross the Hudson, trains must use the Alfred H. Smith Memorial Bridge or another bridge further north near Mechanicville, New York, operated by Pan Am Southern railroad. A May 8, 1974, tie fire ended service across a railroad bridge at Poughkeepsie, 73 miles or 117 kilometers north of New York City. Because of the height of the bridge, trains still had to travel west to Maybrook, New York and back, limiting its use when it was in service. The rails on the bridge at Poughkeepsie have been removed and the bridge was converted into the Walkway Over the Hudson State Historic Park in 2009, a 6,768-foot (2,063 m) pedestrian footbridge.

The only alternative to the Selkirk Hurdle is for rail cars to be floated across Upper New York Bay: an operation run until 2006 by the New York Cross Harbor Railroad and currently run by New York New Jersey Rail, LLC, now owned by the Port Authority of New York and New Jersey. The Port Authority is investing in improvements to its decayed infrastructure, much of which was washed away by Hurricane Sandy. As trucking has become more prevalent, rail float operations across the bay have dwindled and freight operations on the Bay Ridge Branch have decreased from 600,000 railcar loads per year to less than 3,000 carloads per year. The Port Authority of New York and New Jersey hopes some day to transport as many as 25,000 cars annually.

Eliminating the Selkirk Hurdle is a primary objective of the Cross-Harbor Rail Tunnel, proposed to span Upper New York Bay between Brooklyn and Jersey City, New Jersey. A draft environmental impact study for the project was released in November 2014.

== See also ==
- Poughkeepsie Bridge
- Poughkeepsie Bridge Route
- Rail freight transportation in New York City and Long Island
- Selkirk Yard
