= Dutchess Rail Trail =

Paved trail in Dutchess County, New York

Coordinates: 41°40′0″N 73°51′18″W

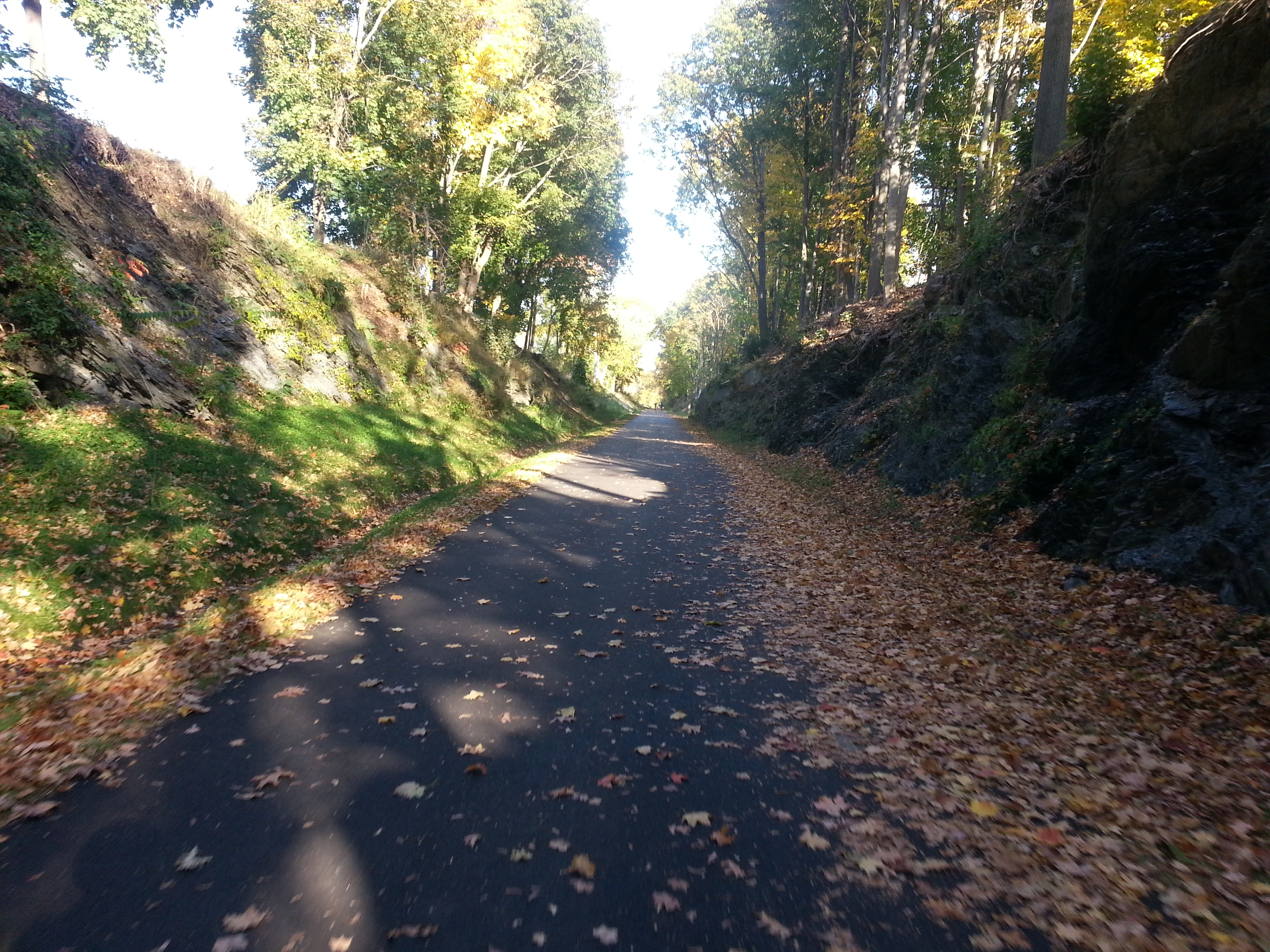
Dutchess Rail Trail in the Fall

The Dutchess Rail Trail is a 13-mile (21 km) rail trail that stretches from the former Hopewell Junction train depot, north to the Poughkeepsie entrance of the Walkway over the Hudson. It's a shared use rail trail open for pedestrians and bicyclers. The Dutchess Rail Trail forms part of the Empire State Trail.

Construction was initially set to begin in July 2007. It was built in five phases. The final stage from Morgan lake in the Town of Poughkeepsie to the Walkway over the Hudson was completed in July 2013.

Conrail's Maybrook Line was double tracked, allowing for a simultaneous paved and packed dirt trail.

In January 2012, a 1-mile stretch of property was purchased from CSX Transportation. An effort was made to develop this stretch of property in 2013, resulting in connections with Walkway Over the Hudson and the Hudson Valley Rail Trail.

The railroad line was built in 1892 by the Central New England Railway; it was severed by a fire on the Poughkeepsie Bridge on May 8, 1974. Dutchess County originally purchased the Maybrook Line to build a limited access highway to Interstate 84 but did not want to pay the monetary and environmental costs of connecting from Hopewell Junction to I-84. At the Hopewell Junction terminus of the train, the Maybrook Trailway, another nearby trail, was later completed and connected in 2020 as part of the Empire State Trail project.
