= Selkirk Yard =

CSX rail yard in Selkirk, New York

Coordinates: 42.55256°N 73.83498°W

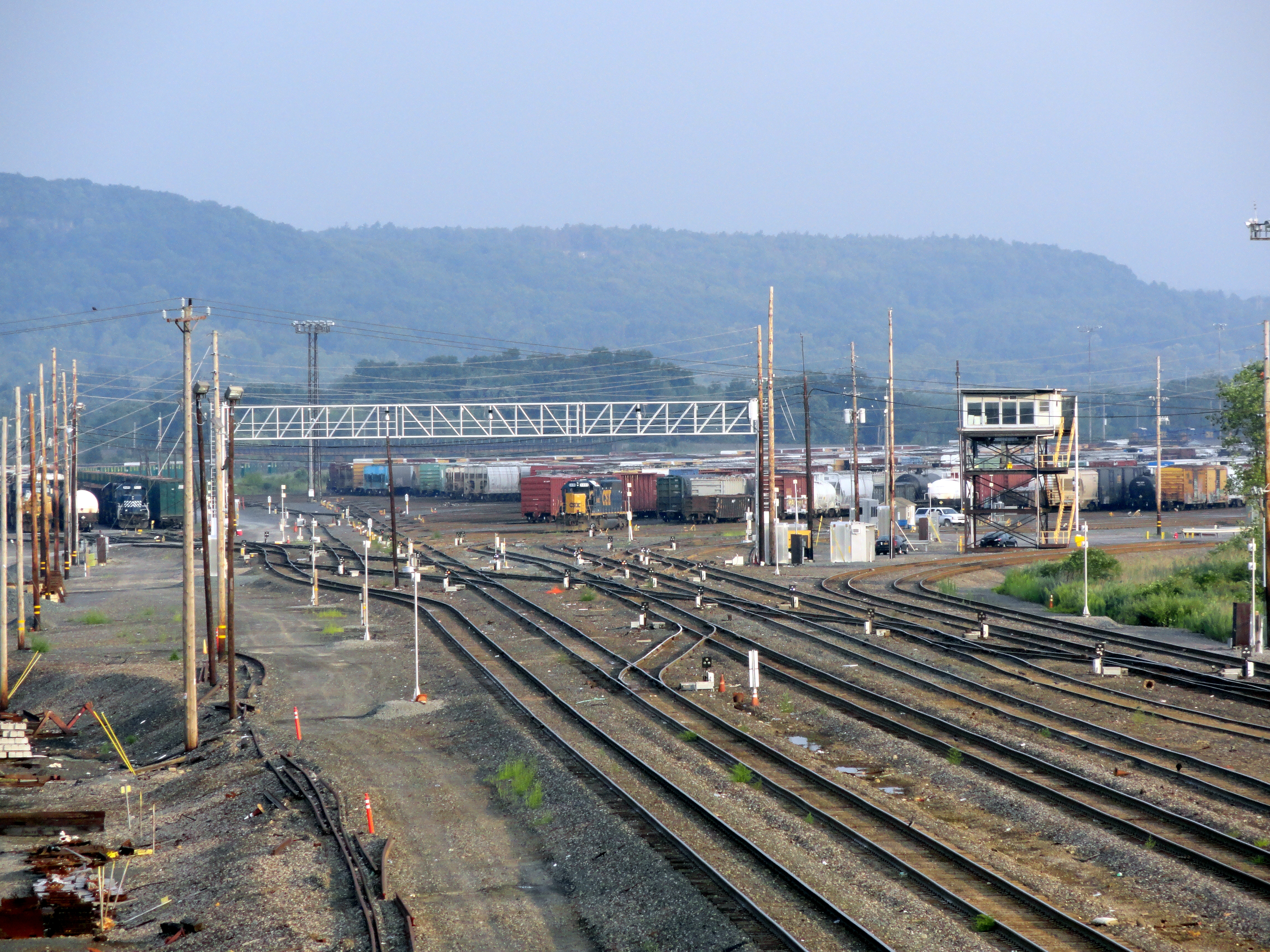
East end of Selkirk Yard, with classification yard on the left, north departure yard in center, and yardmaster tower on the right.

Selkirk Yard is a large freight railroad yard located in Selkirk, New York, about 8 mi (13 km) south of Albany. The yard is owned by CSX Transportation and is its major classification yard for the northeastern United States and the gateway to points east of the Hudson River, including New York City. It is situated just west of the Alfred H. Smith Memorial Bridge on the railroad's Castleton Subdivision, and is the eastern end of the Selkirk Subdivision.

== History ==
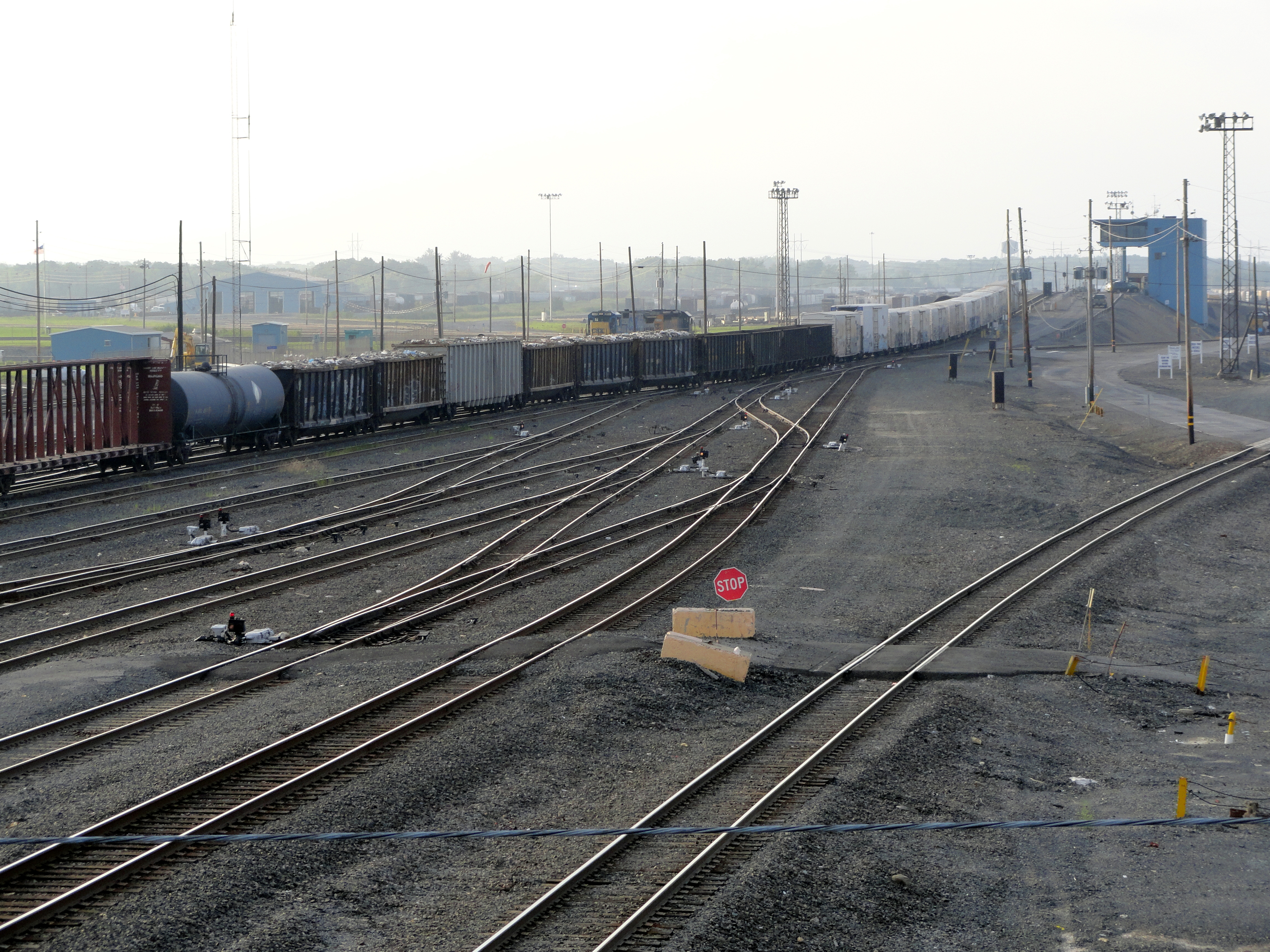
A freight train in the receiving yard is being pushed over the hump. Cars are separated (uncoupled) on the hump and sorted in the classification yard beyond.

Selkirk Yard was built in 1924 by the New York Central Railroad on a 700-acre (280 ha) site. Initially, it had two hump classification yards with a capacity of 11,000 cars and typically handled 8,000 cars per day.

=== 1968 rebuild ===
The facility was rebuilt in 1968 as the Alfred E. Perlman Yard, on an expanded site of 1,250 acres (510 ha). It features a 70-track classification hump yard, several support yards and servicing facilities. The yard can process over 3,200 cars per day, using computerized controls that originally employed a GE PAC 4020.

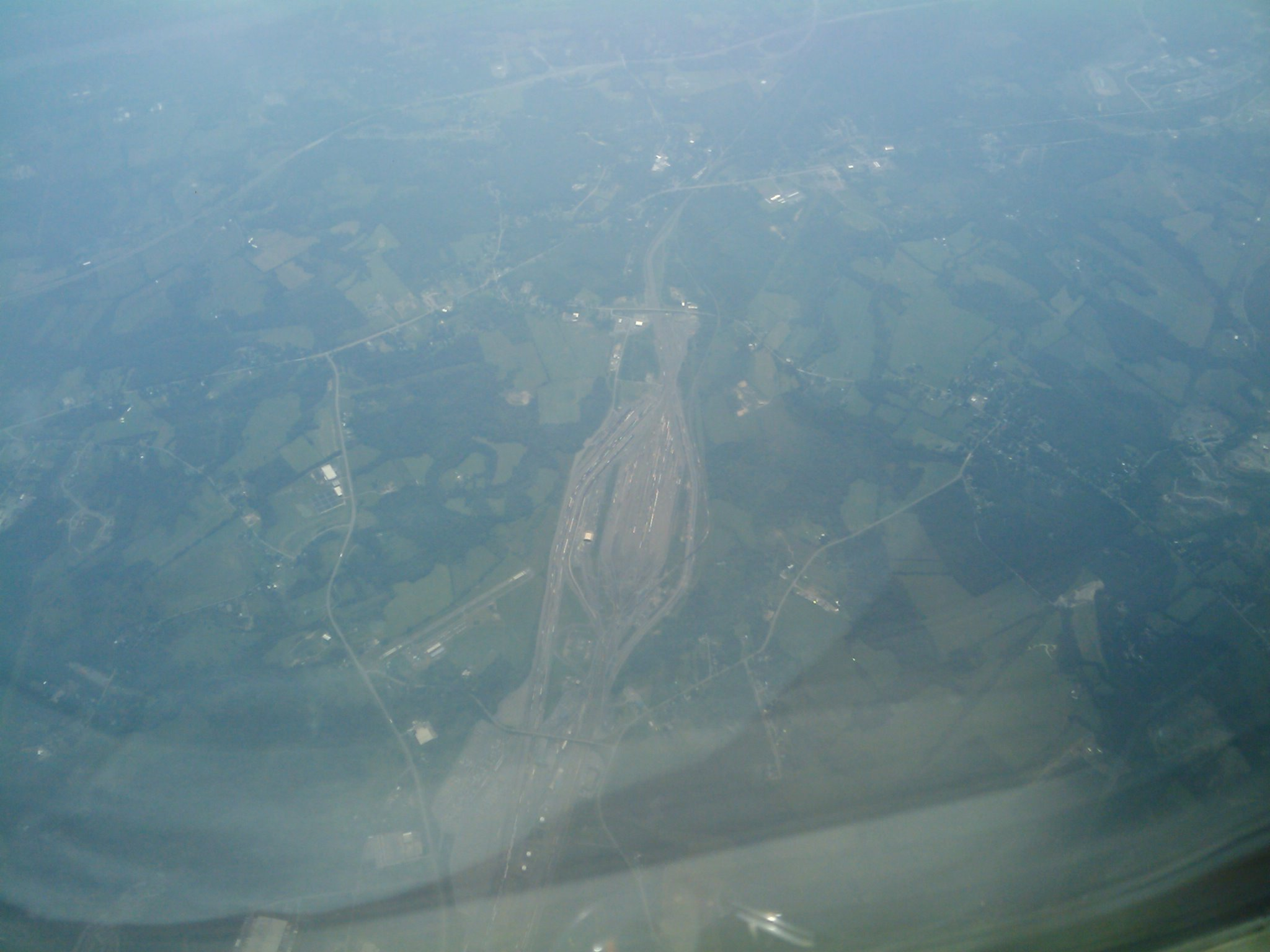
Selkirk Yard seen from above

== Recent improvements ==
Improvements in 2011 included an automobile transload facility and a genset switching locomotive, to improve air quality by reducing emissions from yard operations.

Since 2017, Selkirk features a two-track mainline that runs east to west on the south side of the yard, allowing many run-through trains to swap crews more quickly and easily. Before, these trains ran through the body of the yard.

== See also ==
- List of rail yards
- Selkirk hurdle
