= Alfred H. Smith Memorial Bridge =

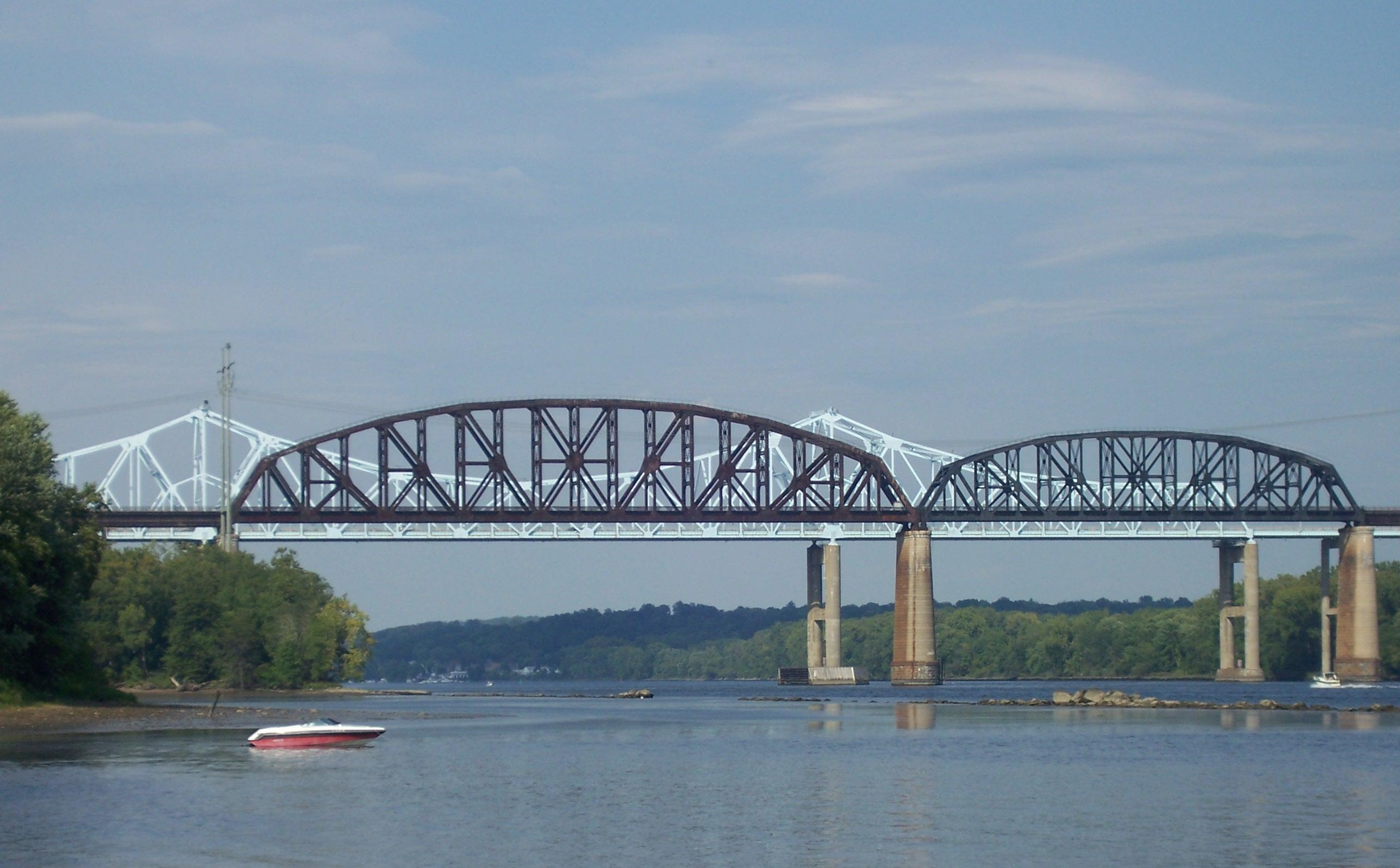
- Foreground: Alfred H. Smith Bridge; Background: Castleton Bridge. Seen from the west shore, south of the bridges.
- Coordinates: 42.5087°N 73.775°W
- Carries: Railroad freight
- Crosses: Hudson River
- Locale: Castleton-on-Hudson, New York
- Maintained by: CSX Transportation

Characteristics
- Design: Truss bridge
- Total length: 1,601.7 m (5,255 ft)
- Clearance above: AAR
- Clearance below: 139 ft (42 m)

Rail characteristics
- No. of tracks: 2

History
- Opened: 1928, 1924

Location
- Interactive map of Alfred H. Smith Memorial Bridge

The Alfred H. Smith Memorial Bridge is a railroad bridge spanning the Hudson River between Castleton-on-Hudson and Selkirk, New York in the United States.

The bridge is owned by CSX Transportation and was originally built for the New York Central Railroad, which was subsequently merged into the Penn Central and then Conrail before being acquired by CSX. The bridge forms part of the Castleton Subdivision of CSX.

The bridge is named in honor of Alfred Holland Smith, the president of the New York Central Railroad who authorized the construction of this bridge as part of an extensive project known as the Castleton Cut-Off. He died in a horse-riding accident in Central Park in 1924, prior to the completion of the bridge in that same year. He is sometimes confused with Alfred E. Smith, New York's governor at the time.

The bridge has been the southernmost rail freight route across the Hudson River since May 8, 1974, after a fire damaged the Poughkeepsie Bridge, 55 miles (89 km) further south. Rail freight traveling direct between most of New York City or Long Island and all points south must take a 280-mile (450 km) detour along the Hudson River and across the bridge, a route known as the Selkirk hurdle. The New York City borough of Staten Island is the sole part of New York State south of the bridge with a direct rail connection over the Arthur Kill Vertical Lift Bridge, but this connection is isolated from the rest of the state. Rail freight may also reach Long Island indirectly via the NYNJ railroad's car float over New York Harbor, but the capacity is extremely limited.

The Cross-Harbor Rail Tunnel project has been proposed as a direct route between Long Island and the US mainland, cutting across New York Harbor.

== History ==
The Alfred H. Smith Memorial Bridge was completed in 1924 to facilitate rail freight traffic, which was growing increasingly bottlenecked through Rensselaer. Steep grades west of Albany required delays of westbound traffic as additional engines were supplied or trains were broken into multiple sections to allow them to climb the hill. The bridge was opposed by rail workers and ferry operators, both of which feared loss of income as traffic moved south of the city. But, backed by Alfred H. Smith, the future President of the New York Central Railroad, contracts were awarded in 1921, with Walsh Construction Company receiving the bulk of the business. Bethlehem Steel's McClintic Marshall subsidiary built the bulk of the structural steel used in the bridge.

Grading began in 1922 and the large concrete pedestal foundations were finished near the end of 1923. The steel trusses were begun in early 1924. By November the concrete deck was complete and New York Governor Alfred E. Smith formally opened the bridge, naming it the Alfred H Smith Memorial Bridge.

== See also ==
- Schodack Island State Park
- List of fixed crossings of the Hudson River
