= Walkway over the Hudson =

Pedestrian bridge in New York, United States

Walkway Over the Hudson
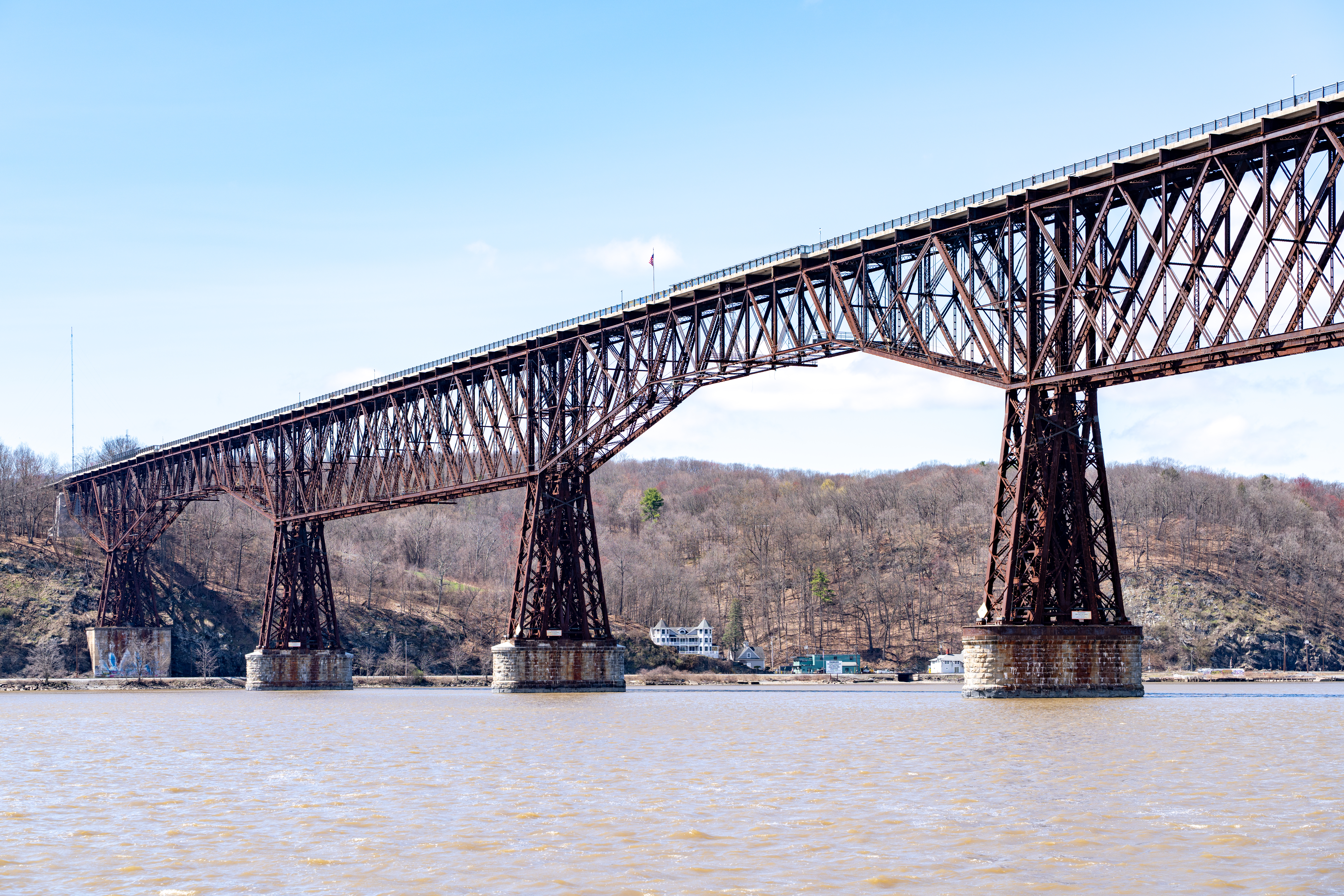
- Coordinates: 41°42′40″N 73°56′38″W
- Carries: Railroad (1889–1974); Hudson Valley Rail Trail (2009–present)
- Crosses: Hudson River
- Locale: Poughkeepsie, New York, to Highland, New York
- Website: walkway.org

Characteristics
- Design: Cantilever deck truss bridge
- Total length: 6,768 feet (1.282 mi; 2.063 km)
- Width: 35 feet (11 m)
- Height: 212 feet (65 m)
- Longest span: 2 × 548 feet (167 m)
- No. of spans: 7
- Clearance below: 160 feet (49 m)

History
- Constructed by: Manhattan Bridge Building Company
- Construction start: 1886
- Construction end: 1889
- Opened: January 1, 1889 (rail service); October 3, 2009 (pedestrian use)

Statistics
- Poughkeepsie–Highland Railroad Bridge
- U.S. National Register of Historic Places
- Location: Poughkeepsie, New York
- Coordinates: 41°42′38″N 73°56′40″W
- Built: 1886–1888
- Architect: John F. O'Rourke; Union Bridge Co.
- NRHP reference No.: 79001577
- Added to NRHP: February 23, 1979 (original); May 20, 2008 (additional documentation)

Location
- Interactive map of Walkway Over the Hudson

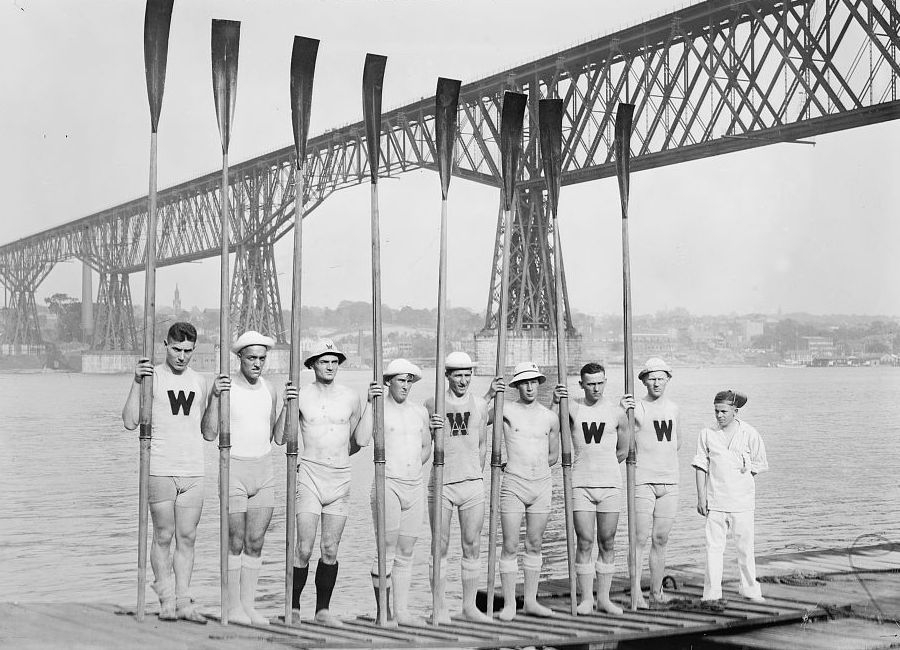
The University of Wisconsin varsity sport rowing team at the Intercollegiate Rowing Association regatta on June 11, 1914, near the Poughkeepsie Bridge

The Walkway Over the Hudson is a steel cantilever bridge crossing the Hudson River between Poughkeepsie and Highland in New York, United States. The structure was completed in 1889 as a double track railroad bridge, later known as the Poughkeepsie–Highland Railroad Bridge. Rail service ended in 1974 after a fire damaged part of the deck.

The bridge was listed on the National Register of Historic Places in 1979, with additional documentation recorded in 2008. It reopened on October 3, 2009 as a pedestrian walkway in the Walkway Over the Hudson State Historic Park. The New York State Bridge Authority owns the bridge structure. The park is operated by the New York State Office of Parks, Recreation and Historic Preservation. The walkway connects the Hudson Valley Rail Trail to the Dutchess Rail Trail, forming part of the Empire State Trail. The Walkway Over the Hudson is the longest elevated pedestrian bridge in the world.

== History ==
=== Planning ===
Proposals for a fixed crossing of the Hudson River south of Albany appeared in the nineteenth century. An 1868 proposal for a railroad bridge at Poughkeepsie was discussed in local newspapers. A separate effort, chartered in 1868 as the Hudson Highland Suspension Bridge Company, proposed a crossing near the later Bear Mountain Bridge site. That bridge was not built.

The State of New York chartered the Poughkeepsie Bridge Company in 1872. Early efforts to finance construction were affected by the Panic of 1873. A later attempt began pier construction in 1876, with work complicated by foundation failures. The contractor entered bankruptcy in 1878.

=== Construction ===
In 1886, the Manhattan Bridge Building Company was organized to finance construction. The Union Bridge Company was subcontracted for major fabrication work. Foundation engineering was performed by Dawson, Symmes, and Usher. Structural engineering included John F. O'Rourke, P. P. Dickinson, and Arthur B. Paine. The bridge opened for rail service on January 1, 1889 after test operation in late December 1888.

The bridge is a multispan cantilever truss structure. It has seven main spans, with a total length of 6,768 feet (2,063 m) including approaches. The deck is approximately 212 feet (65 m) above the river.

=== Rail operation ===
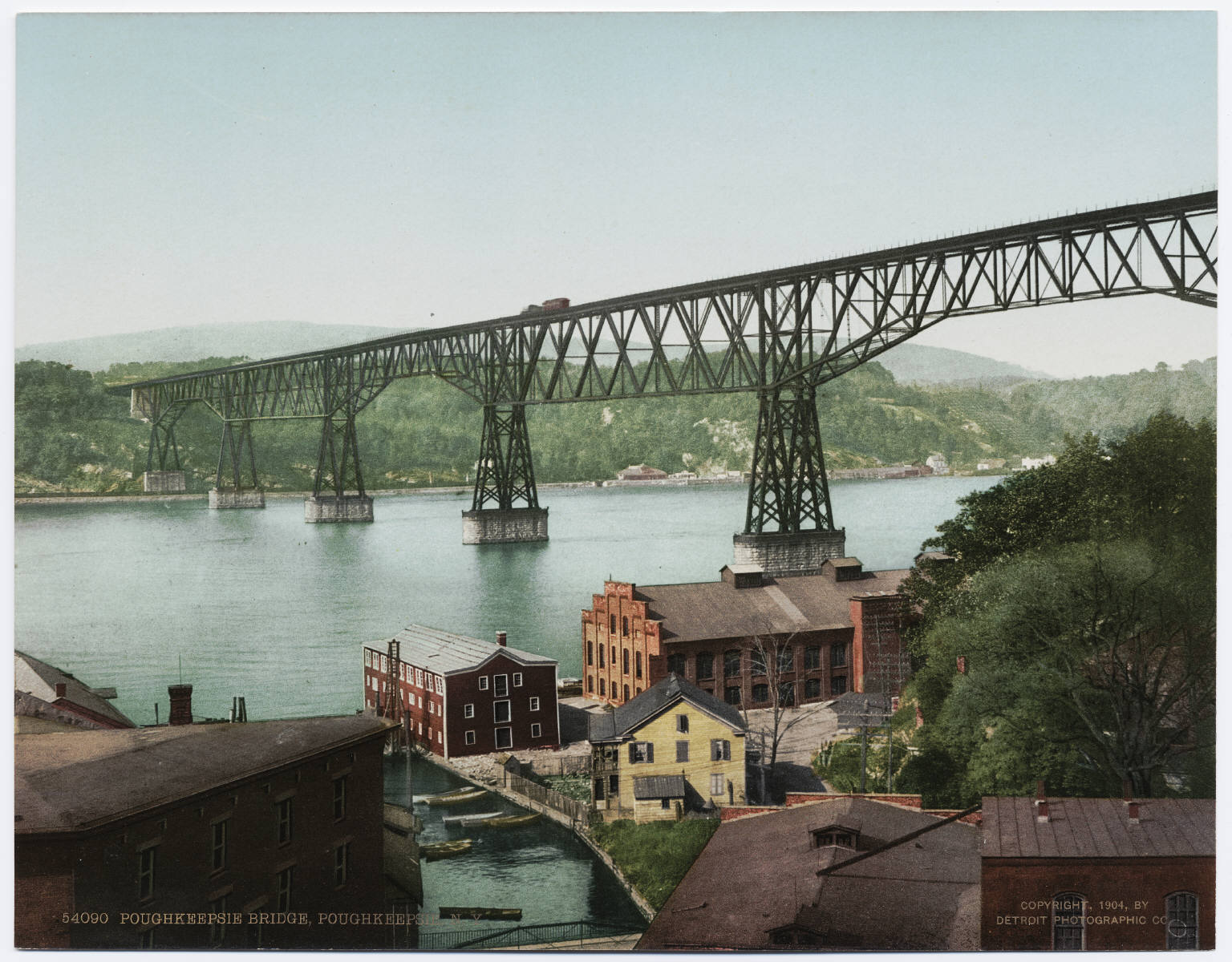
The bridge, c. 1900

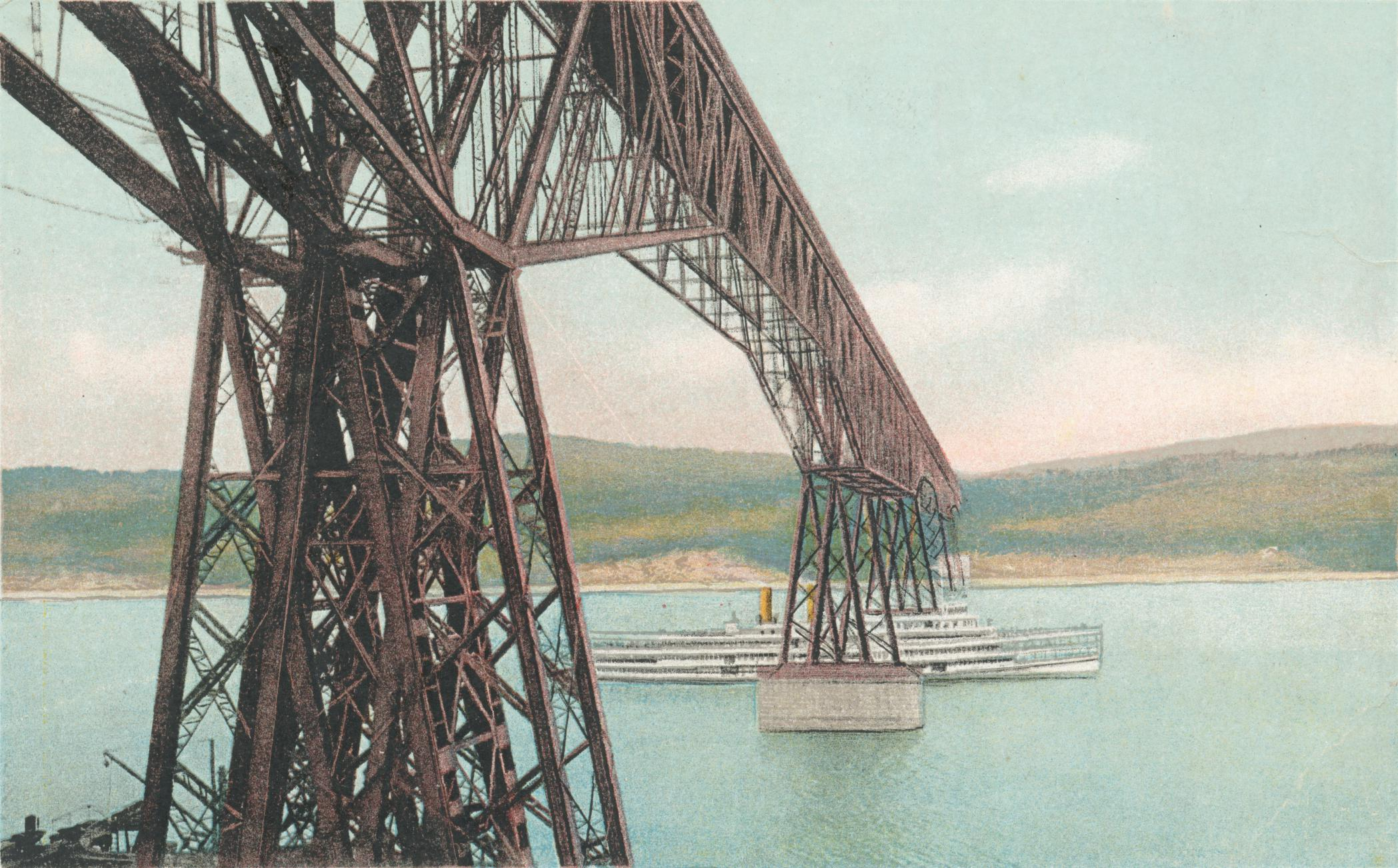
Under the bridge, early 20th century

The bridge served freight traffic on routes linking southern New England, New York, Pennsylvania, and the Midwest via connecting railroads. Ownership, control, or operating interest passed through several railroads during the twentieth century, including the New York, New Haven & Hartford Railroad and later Penn Central. Engineering work to strengthen the bridge was completed in 1907 to accommodate heavier trains, with design work attributed to engineer Ralph Modjeski. In 1917–1918, the tracks were converted to gauntlet track operation, with speed restrictions reported in secondary sources. A centered single track replaced the gauntlet arrangement in 1959.

=== Fire, closure, and disuse ===
On May 8, 1974, a fire damaged approximately 700 feet (210 m) of decking and underlying structure on the east end of the bridge. Rail service over the bridge ended after the fire. In the late 1970s and early 1980s, the bridge remained out of service. Portions of the approach structure required attention after debris fell onto adjacent roadways, prompting repair and removal work reported in local coverage.

==== Ownership changes (1984–1998) ====
In 1984, Conrail sold the bridge to a private investor group for a nominal price, as described in contemporary reporting. During this period, issues related to maintenance, insurance, lighting, and utility attachments were subject to litigation and regulatory proceedings.

=== Conversion to pedestrian use ===
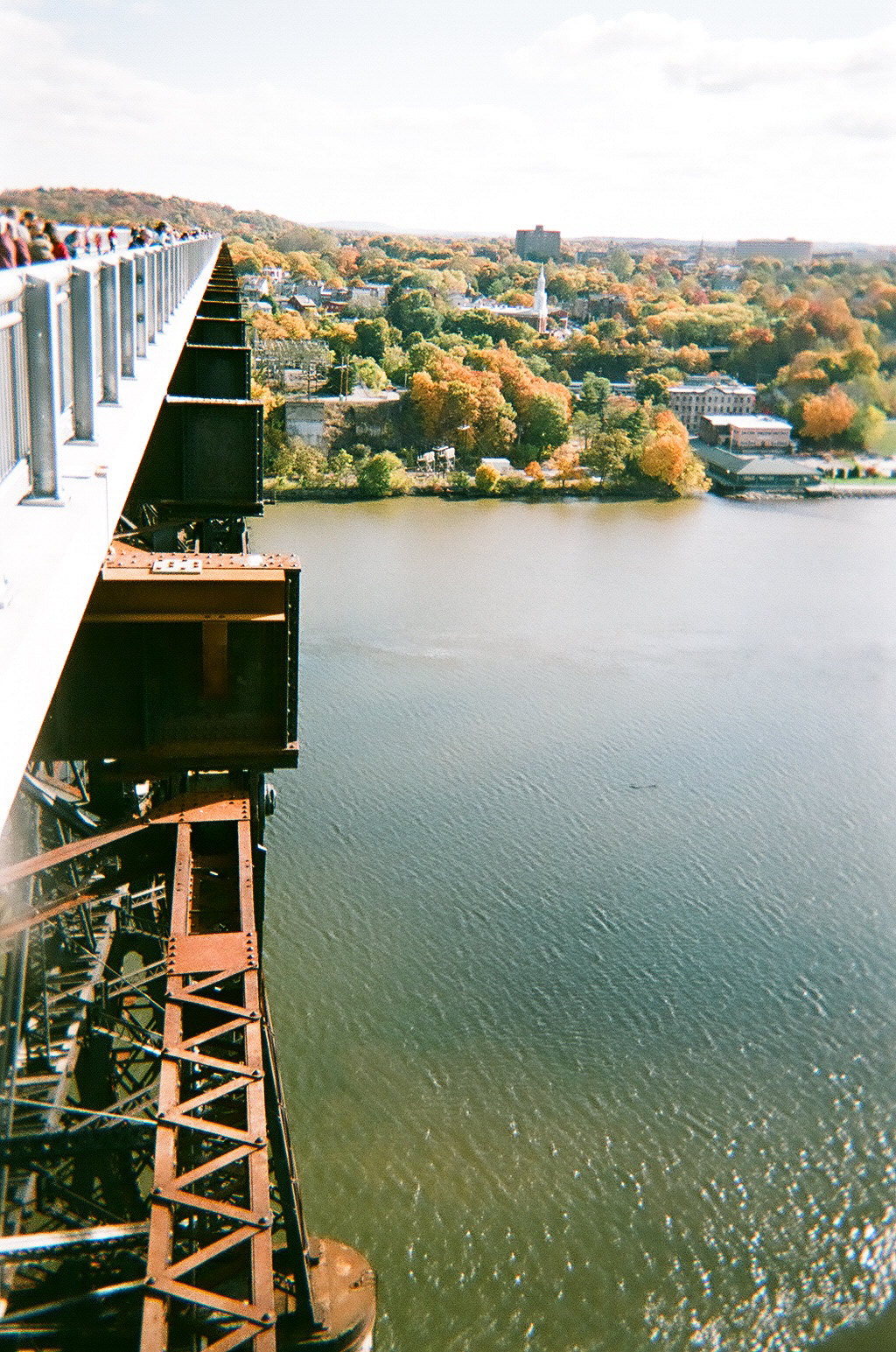
Detail of deck and steel structure

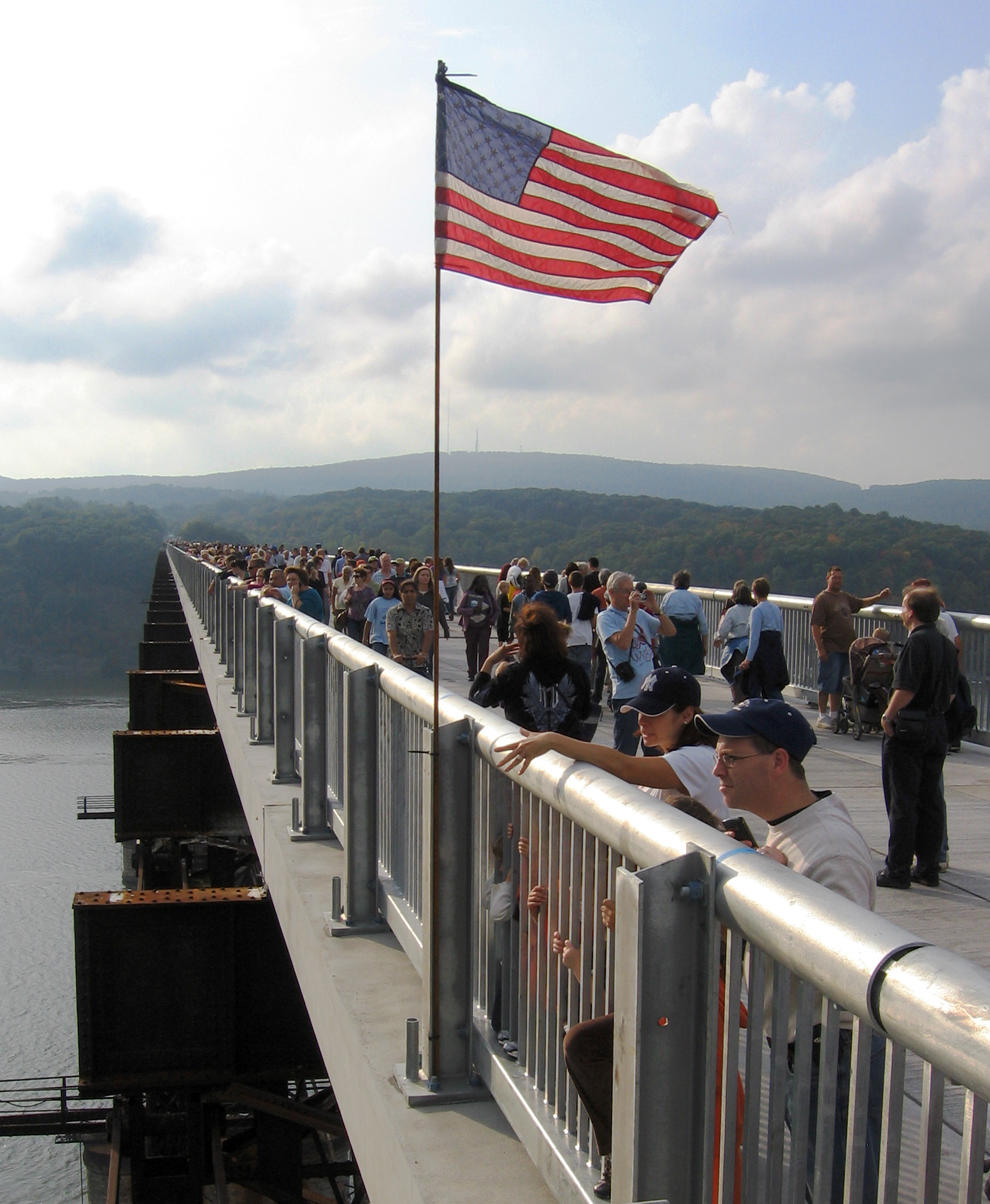
Opening day, October 3, 2009

In 1998, a nonprofit organization, Walkway Over the Hudson, acquired the bridge through its New York corporate entity, with the stated goal of conversion to pedestrian use. Conversion work included structural repairs and installation of a concrete deck. The walkway opened to the public on October 3, 2009.

In December 2010, the nonprofit conveyed the structure to the New York State Bridge Authority.

== Walkway Over the Hudson State Historic Park ==
Logo used by the park

The park opened on October 3, 2009. The bridge is open daily from 7:00 a.m. to dusk, subject to park rules and closures. Parking, restrooms, and visitor facilities are located near each end of the bridge. Bicycles are permitted. Skateboards are prohibited, per posted rules.

The walkway links the Dutchess Rail Trail on the east side with the Hudson Valley Rail Trail on the west side. These trails connect to other segments of the Empire State Trail.

=== Facilities ===
An east pavilion opened in 2013. A glass elevator connecting Upper Landing Park to the walkway opened in 2014.

A welcome center on the west side opened in 2018. A welcome center on the east side opened in 2019. A plaza at the east entrance opened in 2021, funded through state capital sources and partner support.

=== Events ===
The walkway hosts organized runs, seasonal programs, and permitted special events.

A 5K race associated with the opening weekend took place in October 2009, with results published by race organizers.

In January 2017, a march associated with the 2017 Women's March took place on the walkway, with attendance estimates reported in local coverage.

The Walkway Over the Hudson experienced its first suicide in 2011. More recent suicides have happened in 2012, 2013, 2021, 2023 and 2025.

== See also ==
- List of fixed crossings of the Hudson River
- List of bridges documented by the Historic American Engineering Record in New York
