= Selkirk, New York =

- Hamlet
- Location within New York Location within the United States
- Coordinates: 42°32′01″N 73°48′22″W
- Country: United States
- State: New York
- Region: Capital District
- County: Albany
- Town: Bethlehem
- Elevation: 161 ft (49 m)
- Time zone: UTC-5 (EST)
  - Summer (DST): UTC-4 (EDT)
- ZIP Code: 12158
- Area code: 518

Selkirk is a hamlet in the town of Bethlehem, Albany County, New York, United States. It is located south of the city of Albany and is a suburb of that city.

A major freight railyard operated by the Selkirk Subdivision of CSX Transportation is located there; all of the CSX freight traffic going to or from Boston goes through Selkirk on its way to points north, south or west. The route is also used by traffic from New York City via the Alfred H. Smith Memorial Bridge to points west, a detour known as the Selkirk hurdle.

Also in Selkirk is Audubon International, a non-profit environmental educational organization.

The Dr. John Babcock House, Bethlehem Grange No. 137, and Schoonmaker House are listed on the National Register of Historic Places.

Selkirk is accessible via the New York State Thruway at Exit 22, a stop that has connecting routes New York State Route 396 and New York State Route 144.

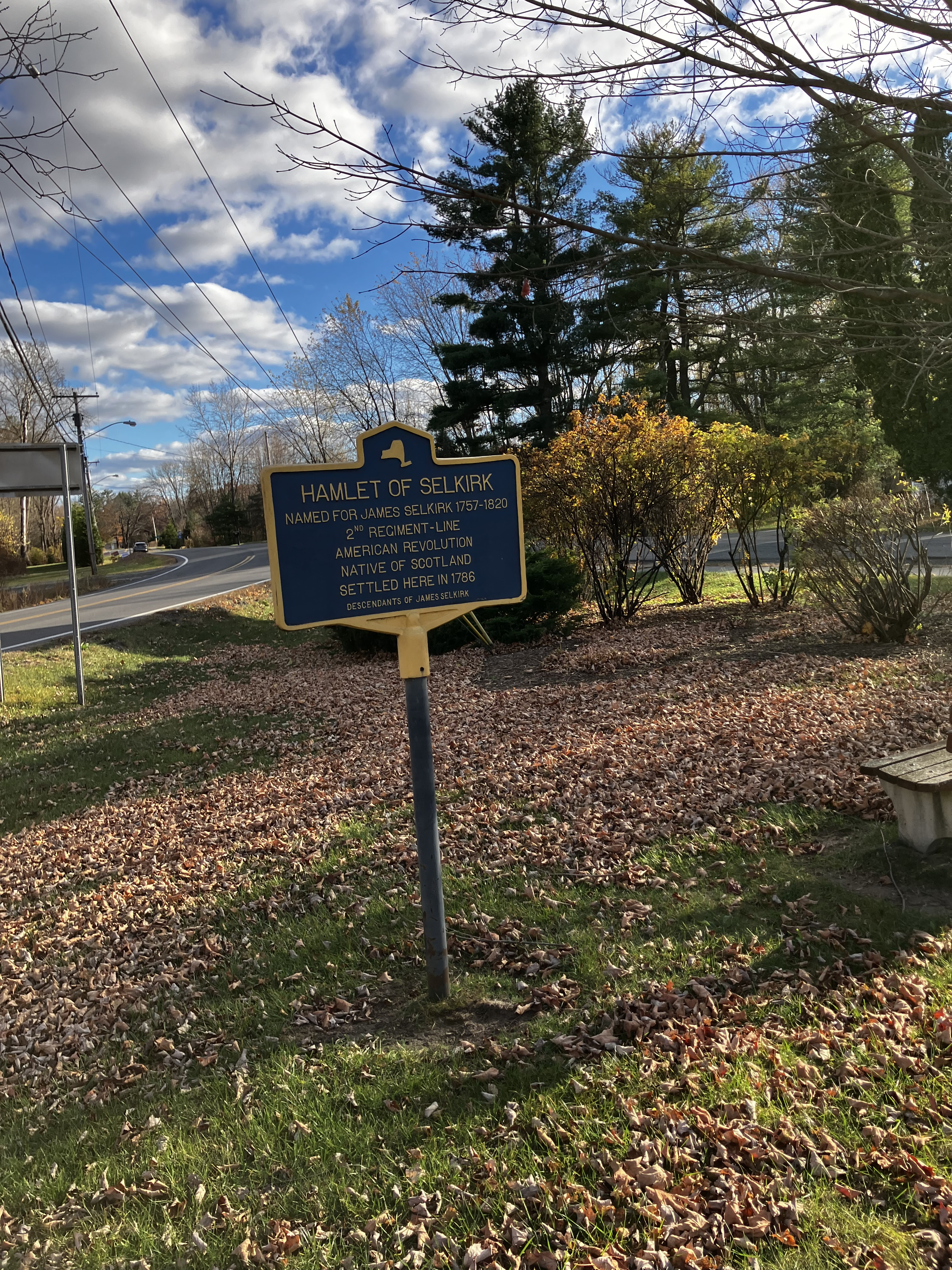
Selkirk, Albany County
