= Chesapeake and Ohio Depot =

Chesapeake and Ohio Depot may refer to:

- Ashland, Kentucky station (Chesapeake and Ohio Railway)
- Chesapeake and Ohio Depot (Catlettsburg, Kentucky)
- Charleston, West Virginia (Amtrak station)
- Charlottesville station (Chesapeake and Ohio Railway)
- Clifton Forge (Amtrak station), Virginia
- Culpeper (Amtrak station)
- Hinton (Amtrak station), West Virginia
- Lee Hall Depot, Newport News, Virginia
- Chesapeake and Ohio Depot (Marlinton, West Virginia)
- Maysville (Amtrak station), Kentucky
- Chesapeake and Ohio Depot (Mount Sterling, Kentucky)
- Chesapeake and Ohio Depot (Petoskey, Michigan)
- Chesapeake and Ohio Depot (Pikeville, Kentucky)
- Prince (Amtrak station), West Virginia
- Chesapeake and Ohio Depot (St. Albans, West Virginia)
- Thurmond (Amtrak station), West Virginia
- White Sulphur Springs (Amtrak station), West Virginia
