= Ohio River Subdivision =

Railway line in West Virginia

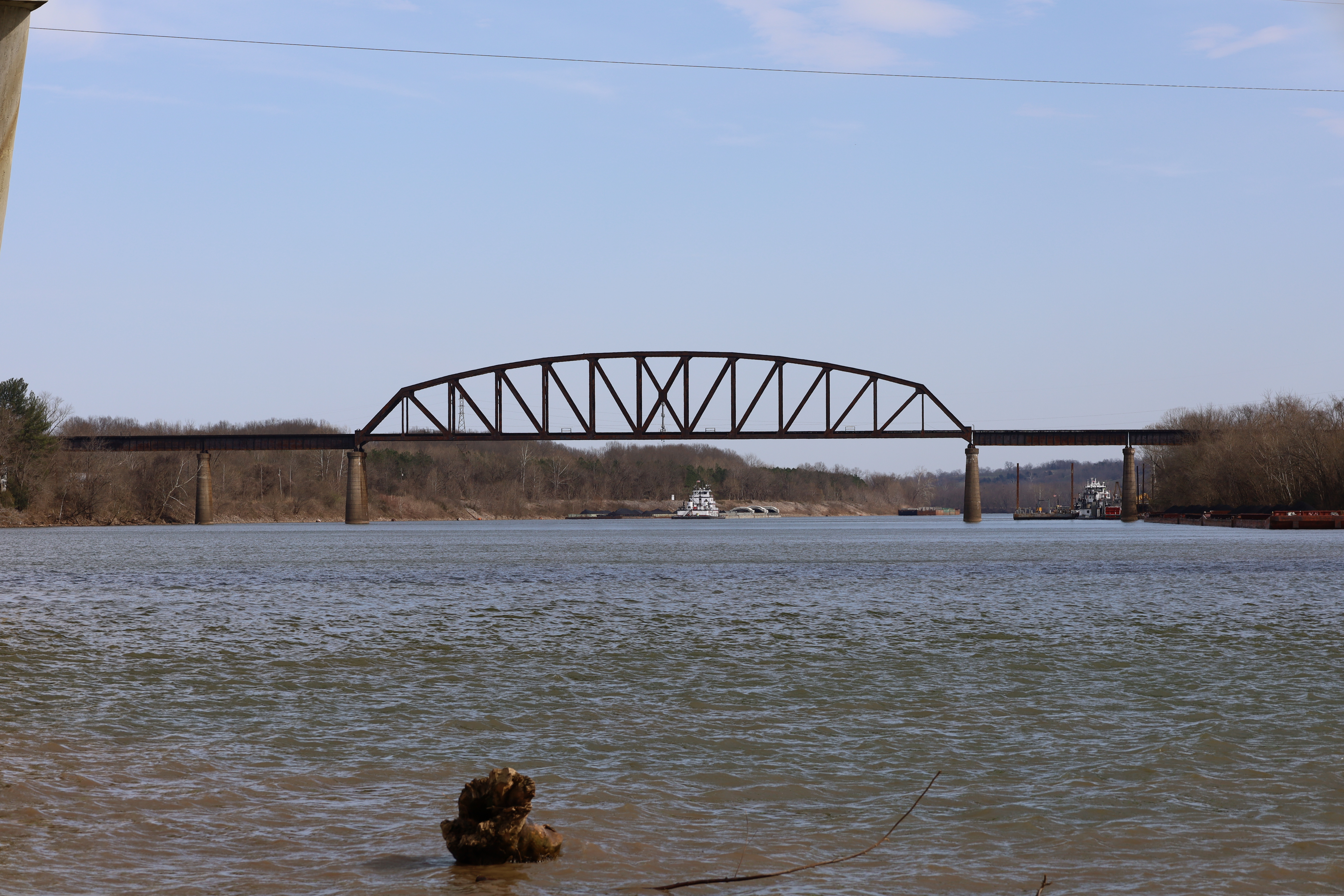
- Ohio River Subdivision crossing the Kanawha River at Point Pleasant, West Virginia in 2022

Overview
- Status: Active
- Owner: CSX Transportation
- Locale: West Virginia
- Termini: Huntington; Wheeling

Service
- Type: Freight rail
- System: CSX Transportation
- Operator(s): CSX Transportation

Technical
- Number of tracks: 1
- Track gauge: 4 ft 8 1/2 in (1,435 mm) standard gauge

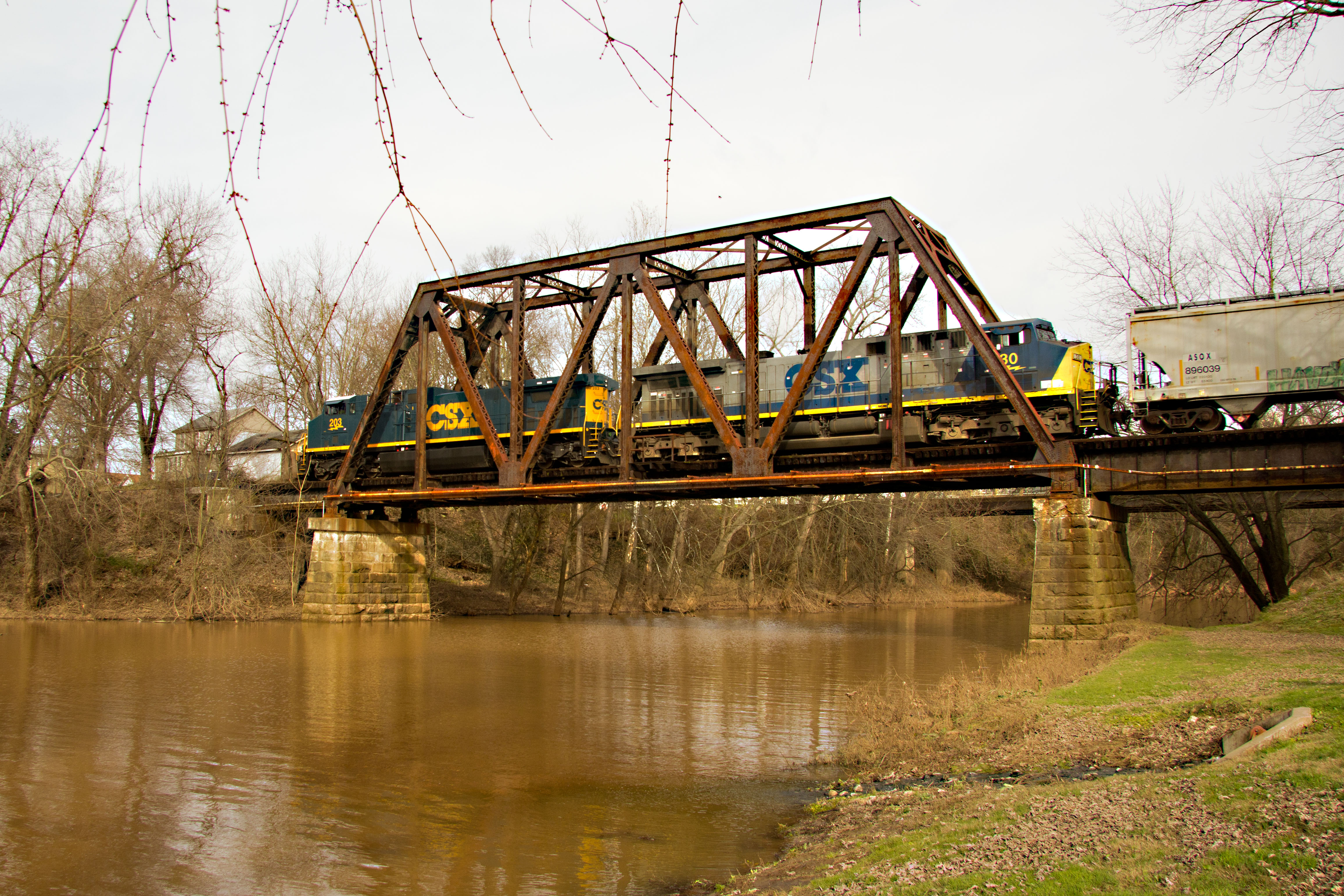
Train on the Ohio River Subdivision crossing Sandy Creek in Ravenswood, West Virginia in 2011

Map

The Ohio River Subdivision is a railway line owned and operated by CSX Transportation in the U.S. state of West Virginia. The line runs from Wheeling southwesterly along the east (left) shore of the Ohio River to Huntington along a former Baltimore and Ohio Railroad line.

The Ohio River Subdivision intersects the Short Line Subdivision at New Martinsville, the Marietta Subdivision at Parkersburg, and the Kanawha Subdivision at Huntington. It also intersects the Kanawha River Railroad at Point Pleasant, where CSX has trackage rights across the Ohio on the Point Pleasant Rail Bridge to the short Pomeroy Subdivision in the state of Ohio.

== History ==
The line south of Moundsville was built by the Ohio River Railroad in the 1880s. Though the Ohio River Railroad built a line from Moundsville north to Wheeling, the parallel tracks of the original B&O main line, opened in 1852, were used there. The entire line became part of the B&O and CSX through leases and mergers.
