= Piney Creek Subdivision =

Railroad line in West Virginia

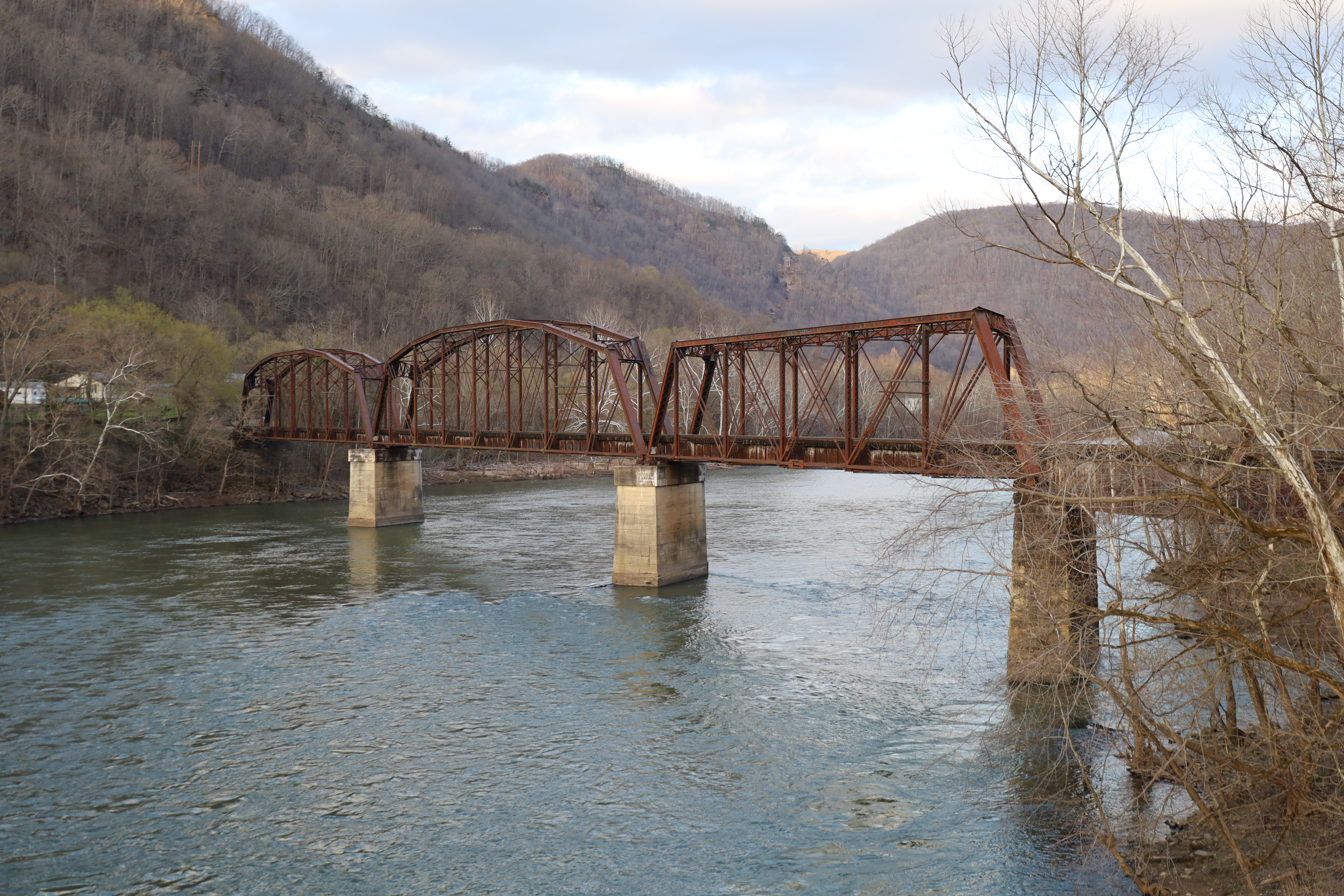
The Piney Creek Subdivision crosses the New River just past its divergence from the New River Subdivision at Prince, West Virginia.

The Piney Creek Subdivision is a railroad line owned by CSX Transportation in the U.S. state of West Virginia. It was formerly part of the CSX Huntington East Division. It became part of the CSX Florence Division on June 20, 2016.

The line runs from Prince, West Virginia, to Glen Daniels Junction, West Virginia, for a total of 26.6 miles (42.8 km). At its east end the line continues west from the New River Subdivision and at its west end the line comes to an end. The Raleigh Southwestern and Winding Gulf Subdivision branches from it near its center, and it crosses but does not junction with the Norfolk Southern Princeton–Deepwater District near its western end.

== See also ==
- List of CSX Transportation lines
