= Cabin Creek Subdivision =

Railway line in West Virginia

The Cabin Creek Subdivision is a railroad line owned by CSX Transportation in the U.S. State of West Virginia. It was formerly part of the CSX Huntington East Division. It became part of the CSX Florence Division on June 20, 2016. The line runs from Cabin Creek, West Virginia, to Red Warrior, West Virginia, for a total of 12.2 miles. At its north end it continues south from the Kanawha Subdivision and at its south end the track comes to an end.

== See also ==
- List of CSX Transportation lines
