= Gauley Subdivision =

Railway line in West Virginia and Virginia

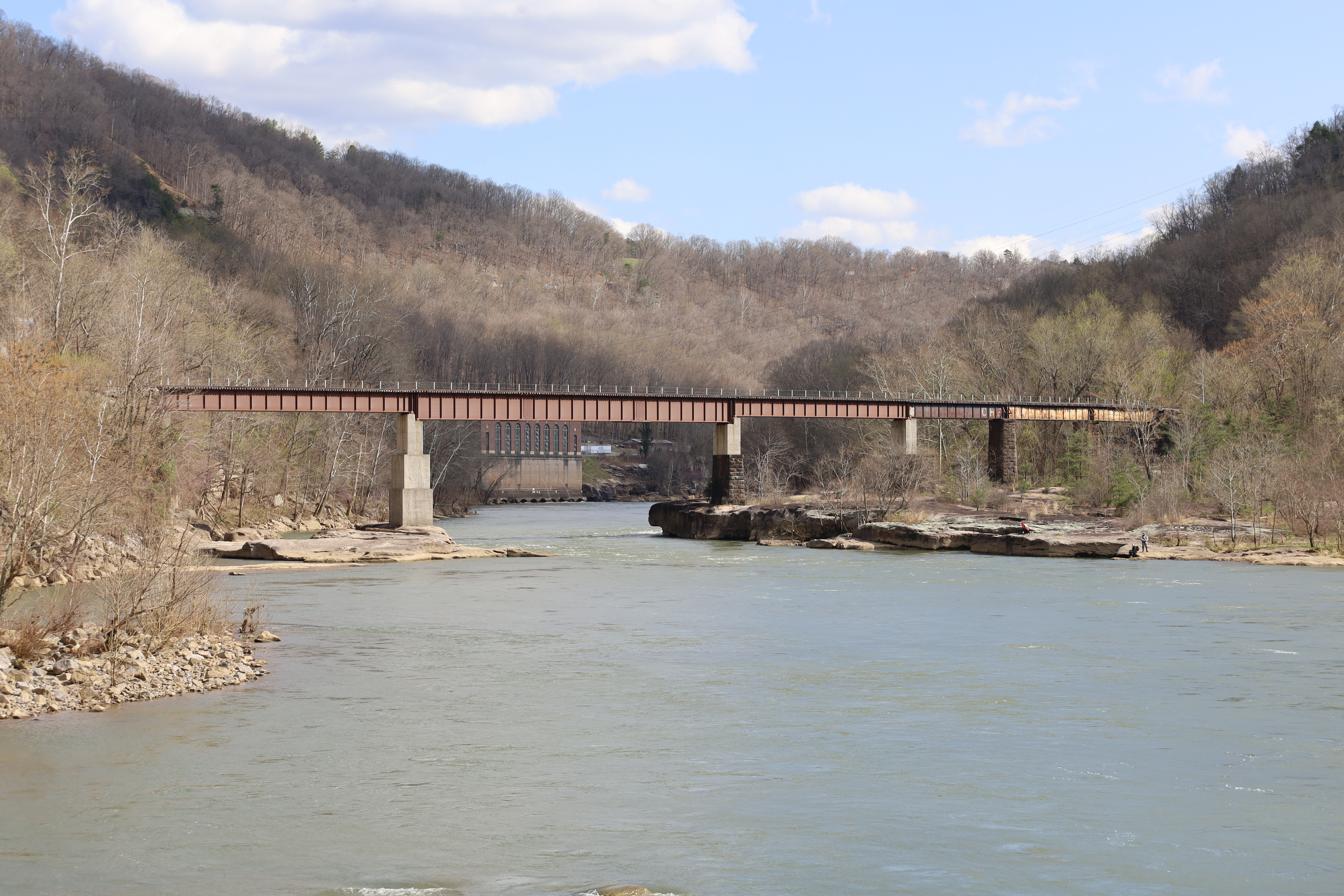
The Gauley Subdivision crosses the New River just past its divergence from the New River Subdivision.

The Gauley Subdivision is a railroad line owned by CSX Transportation in the U.S. states of West Virginia and Virginia. It was formerly part of the CSX Huntington East Division. It became part of the CSX Florence Division on June 20, 2016.

The line runs from Gauley, West Virginia, to Fola, West Virginia, for a total of 22.0 miles (35.4 km). At its east end the line continues west from the New River Subdivision and at its west end the track comes to an end. It follows the Gauley River up to Belva, and then Twentymile Creek to its terminus. It has junctions with the Norfolk Southern West Virginia Secondary twice, at Gauley Bridge and Belva.

== See also ==
- List of CSX Transportation lines
