= Princeton–Deepwater District =

Rail line in West Virginia

The Princeton–Deepwater District is a rail line in West Virginia that connects Deep Water, West Virginia, on the Kanawha River southwards to Princeton, West Virginia, and beyond to rail lines leading to Virginia. It is known for its rugged terrain and opportunities for rail photography.

Originally part of the main line of the Virginian Railway, its northern half is now owned by the Kanawha River Railroad and the southern half by Norfolk Southern Railway.

== Operations ==
The line links parts of the Pocahontas Coalfield beneath Flat Top Mountain to consumers in the Midwest and East Coast.

The very steep 2% grade from Elmore Yard up to Clark's Gap posed challenges for the operation of the line, necessitating "hill runs" where short coal trains were brought up to Clark's Gap and combined into longer trains for the rest of the trip. The segment was difficult for steam locomotives, so the line was electrified south of Mullens, the location of Elmore Yard, from 1926 until 1962, which increased efficiency.

Several branches diverge from the through-line, although some are no longer in use. The Winding Gulf Branch serves the Winding Gulf Coalfield, and connects at its end to the CSX Raleigh Southwestern and Winding Gulf Subdivision. The Guyandotte River Branch is mainly an outlet for westbound coal, and connects to the Gilbert Branch and the CSX Logan Subdivision.

== History ==
The line originally formed the West Virginia half of the Virginian Railway main line, and was constructed between 1896 and 1909. The Winding Gulf Branch was constructed between 1904 and 1910. The Glen Rogers Branch opened in 1923, and the bridge over the Kanawha River was built in 1931. By 1933 the line caused the creation of 91 coal mines along it, as well as an additional 47 on its branches.

The Virginian Railway was acquired in 1959 by Norfolk and Western Railway, which later became Norfolk Southern Railway. The Glen Rogers Branch ceased operation in 1960, but was put into use again from 1973 to 1996.

In 2015, Norfolk Southern mothballed a 50-mile segment of the southern part of the line between Elmore Yard and Princeton due to decreases in coal traffic, opting to divert trains over the Guyandotte River Branch instead. In 2016, the new Kanawha River Railroad acquired the part of the Princeton–Deepwater District north of Maben, as well as most of the connecting West Virginia Secondary.
