= Jarrolds Valley Subdivision =

Railway line in West Virginia

The Jarrolds Valley Subdivision is a railroad line owned by CSX Transportation in the U.S. state of West Virginia. It was formerly part of the CSX Huntington East Division. It became part of the CSX Florence Division on June 20, 2016. The line runs from Whitesville, West Virginia, to Clear Creek, West Virginia, for a total of 15.3 miles (24.6 km). At its south end it continues north from the Big Coal Subdivision and at its north end the track comes to an end.

== See also ==
- List of CSX Transportation lines
