= Florence Division =

Railway division of CSX Transportation

The Florence Division is a railroad division operated by CSX Transportation in the U.S. states of Georgia, Kentucky, North Carolina, South Carolina, Tennessee, Virginia & West Virginia. The Florence Division has 60 Subdivisions. The Subdivisions in italics came from the Huntington East & Huntington West Divisions effective June 20, 2016.

The Subdivisions within the Florence Division are as follows:

- Aberdeen Subdivision
- Alleghany Subdivision
- Andrews Subdivision
- Augusta Subdivision
- Bellwood Subdivision
- Belton Subdivision
- Big Coal Subdivision
- Big Marsh Fork Subdivision
- Blue Ridge Subdivision
- Buffalo Subdivision
- Cabin Creek Subdivision
- Charleston Subdivision
- Charlotte Subdivision
- CN&L Subdivision
- Coal River Subdivision
- Columbia Subdivision
- Creston Subdivision
- Cross Subdivision
- Eastover Subdivision
- G&E Subdivision
- Gauley Subdivision
- Georgetown Subdivision
- Hamlet Subdivision
- Hamlet Terminal Subdivision
- Hopewell Subdivision
- Island Creek Subdivision
- James River Subdivision
- Jarrolds Valley Subdivision
- Kanawha Subdivision
- Kingsport Subdivision
- Lane Subdivision
- Laurel Fork Subdivision
- Logan Subdivision
- Logan and Southern Subdivision
- McCormick Subdivision
- Middle Creek Subdivision
- Monroe Subdivision
- New River Subdivision
- Norlina Subdivision
- North End Subdivision
- Orangeburg Subdivision
- Parmele Subdivision
- Peninsula Subdivision
- Pine Creek Subdivision
- Piney Creek Subdivision
- Pond Fork Subdivision
- Portsmouth Subdivision
- Raleigh Southwestern and Winding Gulf Subdivision
- Richmond Terminal Subdivision
- Rivanna Subdivision
- Rupert Subdivision
- Seth Subdivision
- Sewell Valley Subdivision
- South End Subdivision
- Spartanburg Subdivision
- Tarboro Subdivision
- Terrell Subdivision
- W&W Subdivision
- West Fork Subdivision
- Wilmington Subdivision

== See also ==
- List of CSX Transportation lines
