= Laurel Fork Subdivision =

Railway line in West Virginia

The Laurel Fork Subdivision is a railroad line owned by CSX Transportation in the U.S. state of West Virginia. It was formerly part of the CSX Huntington East Division. It became part of the CSX Florence Division on June 20, 2016. The line is wholly located in Clothier, West Virginia, for a total of 9.0 miles (14.5 km). At its west end it continues east from the Coal River Subdivision and at its east end the line comes to an end.

== See also ==
- List of CSX Transportation lines
