= Seth Subdivision =

Railway line in West Virginia

The Seth Subdivision is a railroad line owned by CSX Transportation in the U.S. state of West Virginia. It was formerly part of the CSX Huntington East Division. It became part of the CSX Florence Division on June 20, 2016. The line runs from Seth, West Virginia, to Prenter, West Virginia, for a total of 10.2 miles (16.4 km). At its north end the line wye's off of the Big Coal Subdivision and at its south end the track comes to an end.

== See also ==
- List of CSX Transportation lines
