= Big Coal Subdivision =

The Big Coal Subdivision is a railroad line owned by CSX Transportation in the U.S. State of West Virginia. It was formerly part of the CSX Huntington East Division. It became part of the CSX Florence Division on June 20, 2016. The line runs from Whitesville, West Virginia, to Sproul, West Virginia, for a total of 35.6 miles (57.3 km). At its north end it continues south from the Big Marsh Fork Subdivision & Jarrolds Valley Subdivision and at its south end it continues south as the Coal River Subdivision.

== See also ==
- List of CSX Transportation lines
