= Montgomery station =

Montgomery station may refer to:

- Montgomery station (Brussels metro), an underground railway station on the Brussels Metro system in Belgium
- Montgomery station (West Virginia), an Amtrak station in Montgomery, West Virginia
- Montgomery railway station, a former train station in Montgomery, Powys, Wales
- Montgomery Union Station, a former train station in Montgomery, Alabama
- Montgomery Street (BART station) station on the San Francisco Bay Area Rapid Transit System (BART) in the United States
