= West Fork Subdivision =

Railway line in West Virginia

The West Fork Subdivision is a railroad line owned by CSX Transportation in the U.S. state of West Virginia. It was formerly part of the CSX Huntington East Division. It became part of the CSX Florence Division on June 20, 2016. The line runs from Van, West Virginia, to Twilight, West Virginia, for a total of 8.5 miles (13.7 km). At its north end the line continues south from the Pond Fork Subdivision and at its south end the track comes to an end.

== See also ==
- List of CSX Transportation lines
