= Short Line Subdivision =

Short Line Subdivision refers to the following CSX Transportation lines:

- Short Line Subdivision (Ohio), formerly the Cleveland Short Line Railway
- Short Line Subdivision (West Virginia), formerly the West Virginia Short Line Railroad

== See also ==
- Shore Line Subdivision
