= Logan and Southern Subdivision =

Railway line in West Virginia

The Logan & Southern Subdivision is a railroad line owned by CSX Transportation in the U.S. state of West Virginia. It was formerly part of the CSX Huntington East Division. It became part of the CSX Florence Division on June 20, 2016. The line runs from Logan, West Virginia, to Sarah Ann, West Virginia, for a total of 11.7 miles (18.8 km). At its north end it continues south from the Island Creek Subdivision just west of that line's eastern terminus at the Logan Subdivision, and at its south end the line comes to an end.

== See also ==
- List of CSX Transportation lines
