= Mavis Manor =

Building in West Virginia, United States

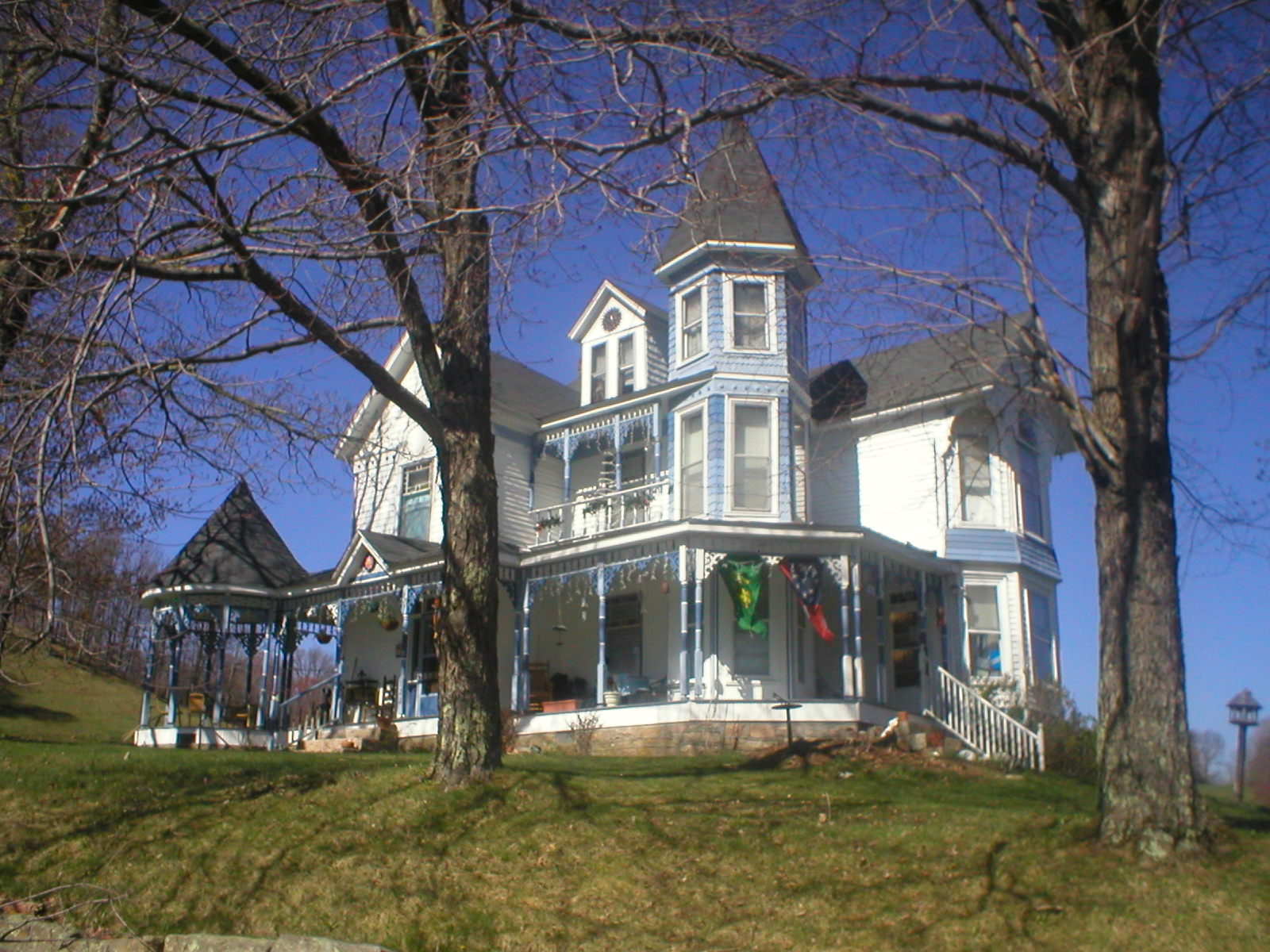
- An Appalachian example of the Gilded Age in America
- Interactive map of the Mavis Manor area

General information
- Architectural style: Queen Anne; Victorian house
- Location: 122 Grayson-Raleigh-Wythe Historic Turnpike Flat Top, West Virginia, United States
- Coordinates: 37°35′22″N 81°06′24″W
- Construction started: 1890s
- Completed: c. 1897
- Cost: $5,000

Technical details
- Structural system: concrete foundation; Chestnut/Oak frame;
- Size: In excess of 4,200 sq ft (390 m^{2}). on 2 floors (excluding basement) plus tower; 12 rooms

Mavis Manor is a Queen Anne style, Victorian manor house located in Flat Top, West Virginia in Mercer County on 33 acres (13 ha) of Flat Top Mountain. It has been restored by the Marchese family under the supervision of Sir Justyn J. Marchese.

== History ==
Mavis Manor was built in approximately 1897 for the Lilly family. The Mavis estate adjoins Huff Knob (elev. 3,570) and is part one of the highest elevations in southern West Virginia. The manor was used by Dr. L.L. Lilly as a hospital designed to keep overnight patients. Mavis Manor was constructed of most Chestnut and Oak timbered in nearby Summers County, milled in Hinton, West Virginia then transported by horse-drawn wagon via the Grayson-Raleigh-Wythe turnpike. The inspiration for the manor came after Miss Sue Tickle visited Bramwell, West Virginia.

Probably the most pretentious Lilly home was built by Dr. Lonnie Lilly at the Flat Top Post Office and on the Mercer County line, very much on the inspiration of his wife, a Miss Sue Tickle, who was said to be from the Bluefield area. She first married a McCormack, who was killed in an accident shortly after their marriage (in a buggy accident) and then married Dr. Lonnie Lilly. She operated a millinery shop at Dunns and there she drew her plans for their home which they built at Flat Top containing twelve rooms with two long halls extending the length of the house and containing ten closets and seven fireplaces. The right side of the house had an entrance to Dr. Lilly's office for his patients and in his office he had a trap door with shelves that lowered to the basement to keep his medical supplies cool when it was not being used in days before refrigeration. The house was built in approximately 1897 and was designed to keep overnight patients who traveled long distance for treatment. Cost of building was $5,000.

== Mavis Manor grounds during the civil war ==
Camp Flat Top, May 21, 1862. Wednesday.-A warm, windy, threatening day. Drilled the regiment this morning; marched to the summit of Flat Top, thence along the summit to the Raleigh Road, and so back to camp. Men looked well. Companies A, E, and K, under Major Comly, with a howitzer, marched to Packs Ferry to hold it, build boats, and the like. They take about twenty carpenters from the Twenty-third, also six cavalry men and a howitzer.

FLAT TOP MOUNTAIN, June 3, 1862. DEAREST: -- I am made happy by your letter of the 24th and the picture of Webb. Enclosed I send Webb a letter from Lieutenant Kennedy. I am not surprised that you have been some puzzled to make out our movements and position from the confused accounts you see in the papers. Our log-book would run about this way: Flat Top Mountain, twenty miles south of Raleigh, is the boundary line between America and Dixie—between western Virginia, either loyal or subdued, and western Virginia, rebellious and unconquered. [Here follows an account of the movements and activities of the regiment during May, which is a repetition in brief of previous letters and Diary entries.] Here we are safe as a bug in a rug—the enemy more afraid of us than we are of them—and some of us do fear them quite enough. My opinion was, we ought to have fought Marshall at Princeton, but it is not quite certain. All our regiments have behaved reasonably well except [the] Thirty-fourth, Piatt's Zouaves, and Paxton's Cavalry. Don't abuse them, but they were pretty shabby. The zouaves were scattered seventy miles, reporting us all cut to pieces, etc., etc. Enough of war. The misfortune of our situation is, we have not half force enough for our work. If we go forward the enemy can come in behind us and destroy valuable stores, cut off our supplies, and cut through to the Ohio River,--for we are not strong enough to leave a guard behind us. We look with the greatest interest to the great armies. Banks' big scare will do good. It helps us to about fifty thousand new men. I nearly forgot to tell you how we were all struck by lightning on Saturday. We had a severe thunder-storm while at supper. We were outside of the tent discussing lightning—the rapidity of sound, etc., etc., Avery and Dr. McCurdy both facing me, Dr. Joe about a rod off, when there came a flash and shock and roar. The sentinel near us staggered but did not fall. Dr. McCurdy and Avery both felt a pricking sensation on the forehead. I felt as if a stone had hit me in the head. Captain Drake's arm was benumbed for a few minutes. My horse was nearly knocked down. Some horses were knocked down. Five trees near by were hit, and perhaps one hundred men more or less shocked, but strange to say "nobody hurt."

"All things still look well for a favorable conclusion to the war. I do not expect to see it ended so speedily as many suppose, but patience will carry us through. I thought of you before I got up this morning, saying to myself, 'Darling Lucy, I love you so much,' and so I do. Affectionately, R."

== Mavis Institute ==
The Mavis Institute Co-Op is a non-profit year round educational farm specializing in permaculture education based in the grounds of Mavis Manor. The institute focuses on education via Outreach, but is also a working 33 acre farm. In addition to permaculture classes are available on beekeeping, gardening techniques and animal husbandry with a focus on creating sustainable food supplies.
