= Pine Creek Subdivision =

Railway line in West Virginia

The Pine Creek Subdivision is a railroad line owned by CSX Transportation in the U.S. state of West Virginia. It was formerly part of the CSX Huntington East Division. It became part of the CSX Florence Division on June 20, 2016. The line runs in Omar, West Virginia, for a total of 6.0 miles (9.7 km). At its east end it branches off of the Logan and Southern Subdivision and at its west end the line comes to an end.

== See also ==
- List of CSX Transportation lines
