= Montgomery station (West Virginia) =

Montgomery, WV
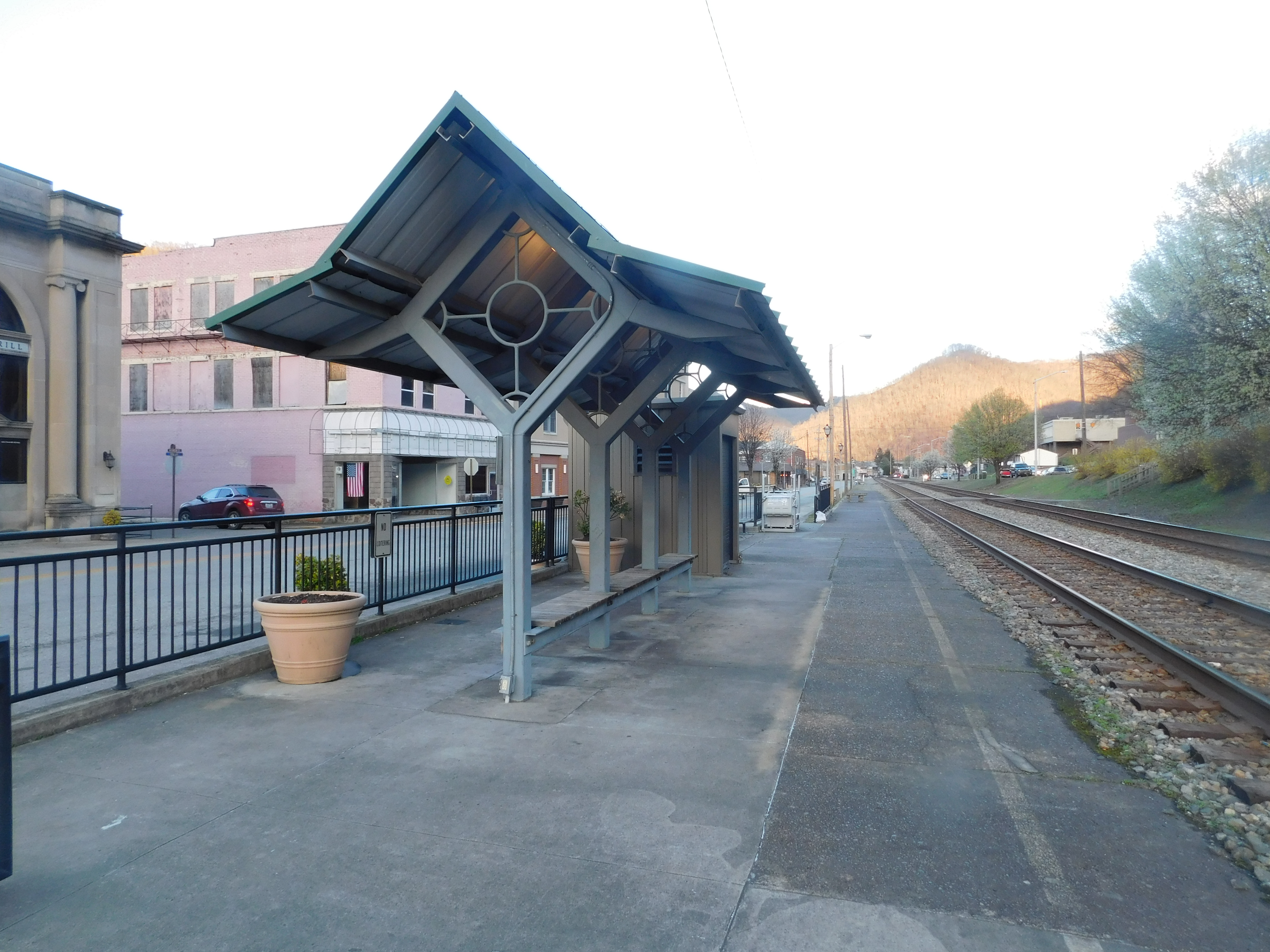
- Montgomery station in March 2017.

General information
- Location: Third Avenue and Washington Street; Montgomery, West Virginia; United States
- Coordinates: 38°10′51″N 81°19′26″W
- Line: CSX Kanawha Subdivision
- Platforms: 1 side platform
- Tracks: 2

Other information
- Station code: Amtrak: MNG

History
- Rebuilt: 2020

Passengers
- FY 2025: 618 (Amtrak)

Services
Preceding station	Amtrak	Following station
Charleston toward Chicago	Cardinal	Thurmond toward New York
Former services
Preceding station	Chesapeake and Ohio Railway	Following station
Cabin Creek toward Cincinnati	Main Line	Deepwater toward Washington, D.C. or Phoebus
Location

Montgomery station is an Amtrak station in Montgomery, West Virginia, served by the Cardinal passenger train. The station is an open metal shed built along platforms previously used by the Chesapeake and Ohio Railway, which demolished the former brick station house in the 1970s after the company ended passenger service in 1971. The station platform was rebuilt in 2020 to provide greater accessibility.
