= Flat Top, West Virginia =

Unincorporated community in West Virginia, United States

- Unincorporated community
- Location within West Virginia Location within the United States
- Coordinates: 37°35′22″N 81°06′24″W
- Country: United States
- State: West Virginia
- County: Mercer
- Elevation: 3,751 ft (1,143 m)
- Time zone: UTC-5 (Eastern (EST))
  - Summer (DST): UTC-4 (EDT)
- ZIP code: 25841
- Area codes: 304 & 681
- GNIS feature ID: 1539061

Flat Top is an unincorporated community in Mercer County, West Virginia, United States. Flat Top is located on U.S. Route 19, 19 miles (31 km) south of Beckley.

The Flat Top Post Office began operation on March 5, 1852.

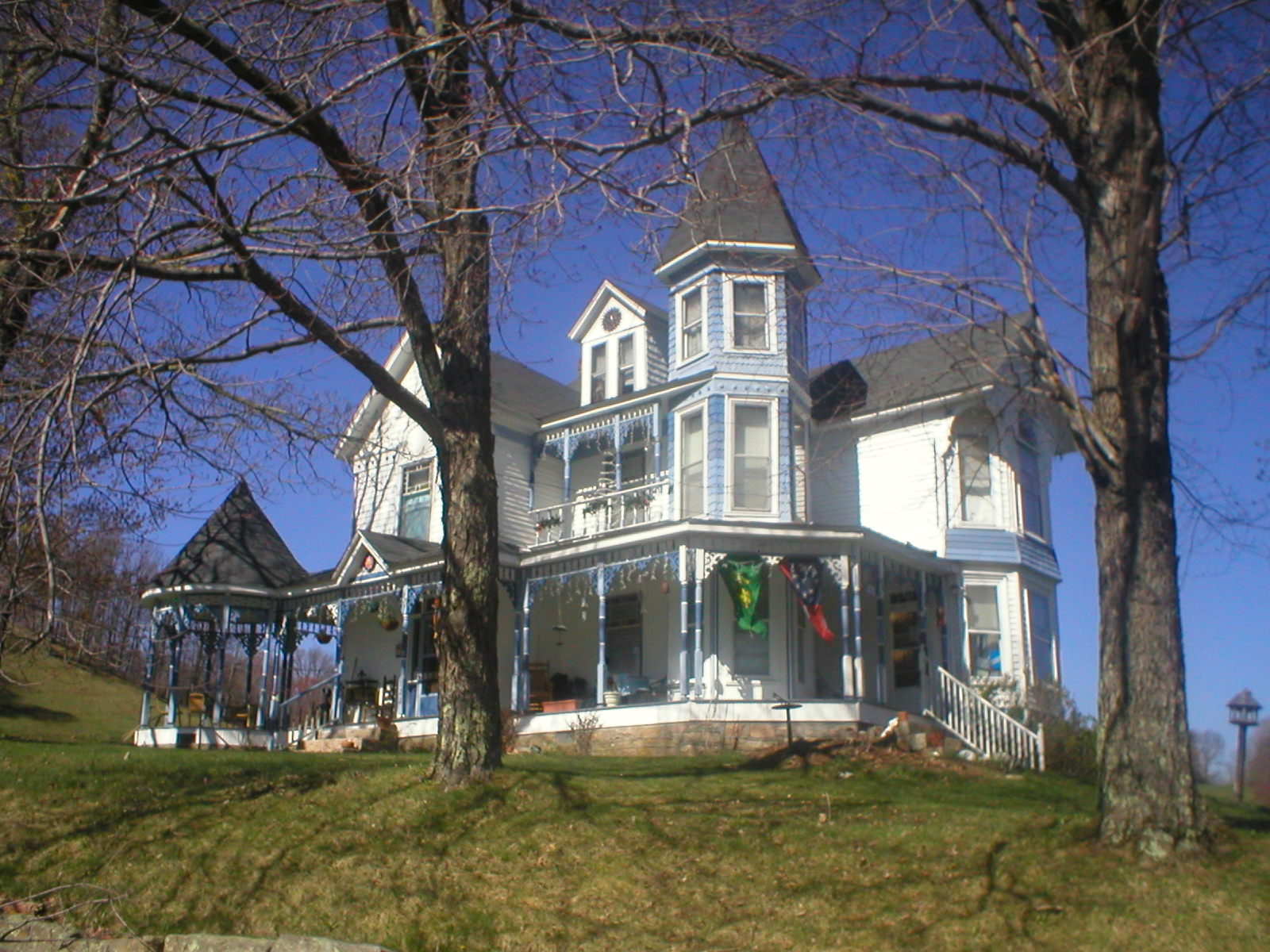
Mavis Manor situated at 'flat' part of Flat Top

Flat Top is home of Mavis Manor a Queen Anne style, Victorian manor house and one of southern West Virginia’s first Farmstay.

The community takes its name from the level highlands upon which it is situated—the "flat top," which follows the crest of "Great Flat Top Mountain" for nearly 30 miles, from the New River Gorge, in the northeast, to the Virginia border in the southwest. The Lilly Monument, erected to honor the memories of settlers Robert and Fannie Lilly, overlooks the community from a knoll to its northeast.
