= Bridgeport Subdivision =

Railway line in West Virginia

- Map Route of the subdivision from Grafton to Clarksburg

Overview
- Status: Active
- Owner: CSX Transportation
- Locale: West Virginia
- Termini: Grafton; Clarksburg

Service
- Type: Freight rail
- System: CSX Transportation
- Operator(s): CSX Transportation

Technical
- Number of tracks: 1-2
- Track gauge: 4 ft 8 1/2 in (1,435 mm) standard gauge

The Bridgeport Subdivision is a railroad line owned and operated by CSX Transportation in the U.S. state of West Virginia. The line runs from Grafton west to Clarksburg along a former Baltimore and Ohio Rail Road line. At its east end, the Bridgeport Subdivision becomes the Mountain Subdivision; its west end is at the Short Line Subdivision. It is part of the CSX Baltimore Division.

== History ==
The Bridgeport Subdivision opened in 1857 as part of the Northwestern Virginia Railroad and was immediately leased by the B&O. It changed hands to CSX through mergers.
