= Richmond and Alleghany Railroad =

Former railway company in the United States of America

Overview
- Headquarters: 122 South 8th Street, Richmond, Virginia
- Locale: Richmond - Buchanan, Virginia
- Dates of operation: March 4, 1880–1888
- Predecessor: James River and Kanawha Canal
- Successor: Chesapeake and Ohio Railway

Technical
- Track gauge: 4 ft 8 1/2 in (1,435 mm) standard gauge

The Richmond and Alleghany Railroad was built along the James River along the route of the James River and Kanawha Canal from Richmond on the Fall Line at the head of navigation to a point west of Lynchburg near Buchanan, Virginia, and combined with the Buchanan and Clifton Forge Railway Company to reach Clifton Forge, Virginia.

The James River Subdivision is a railroad line owned by CSX Transportation in the U.S. state of Virginia. It was formerly part of the CSX Huntington East Division. It became part of the CSX Florence Division on June 20, 2016. The line runs from Gladstone, Virginia to Clifton Forge, Virginia for a total of 110.2 miles. At its east end it continues west from the Rivanna Subdivision and at its west end it continues west as the Alleghany Subdivision.

== History ==
Long a dream of early Virginians such as George Washington, the canal was never completed as envisioned to link the James and Ohio Rivers. Beginning in the 1830s, railroads overtook canals as a preferred technology for transportation in Virginia. The canal was conveyed to the new railroad company by a deed dated March 4, 1880. Railroad construction workers promptly started laying tracks on the towpath. The company constructed the railroad using African-American convict laborers from Virginia penitentiaries.

Led by Francis O. French of New York and later starting in 1884 by James T Closson of New York the new railroad offered a water-level route from Richmond, Virginia to Clifton Forge through the Blue Ridge Mountains at Balcony Falls. In 1888 the railroad was leased, and later purchased, by Collis P. Huntington's Chesapeake and Ohio Railway (merger with C&O occurred in 1889).

Today, the former Richmond and Alleghany Railroad is a major route of CSX Transportation. It forms the Rivanna and James River subdivisions. The eastern terminus is Richmond's Main Street Station. It meets the former Virginia Central Railroad (now operated by the Buckingham Branch Railroad, a short-line operator) at Rivanna Junction.

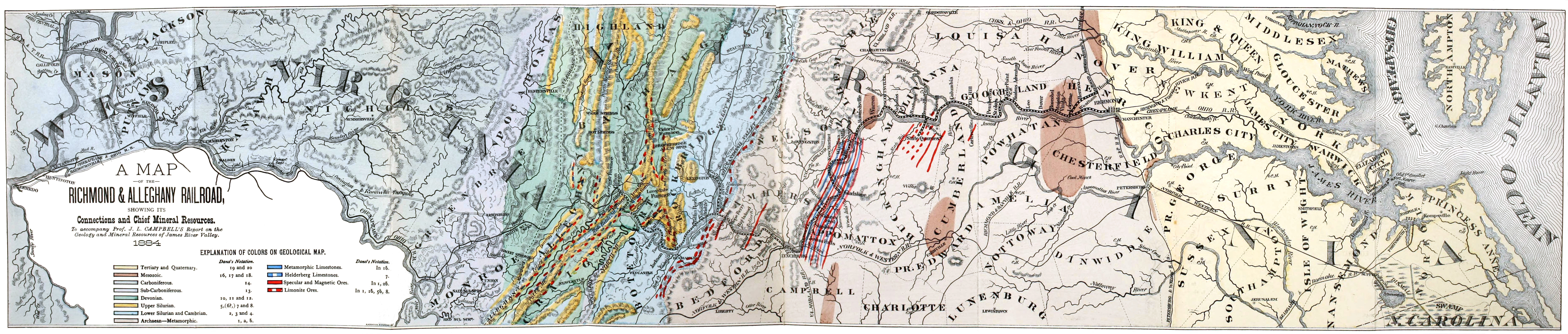
1884 map of the Richmond and Alleghany overlaid on a geological map of the route and connecting routes

<1. Laura E Armitage. "The Richmond and Alleghany," THE RAILWAY AND LOCOMOTIVE SOCIETY BULLETIN, No. 88 (May, 1953) pp. 59–68.> <2. Mary Lynn Bayliss, THE DOOLEYS OF RICHMOND: AN IRISH IMMIGRANT FAMILY IN THE OLD AND NEW SOUTH, University of Virginia Press, 2017, p. 125>
