= Point Pleasant Rail Bridge =

Coordinates: 38°50′46″N 82°08′29″W

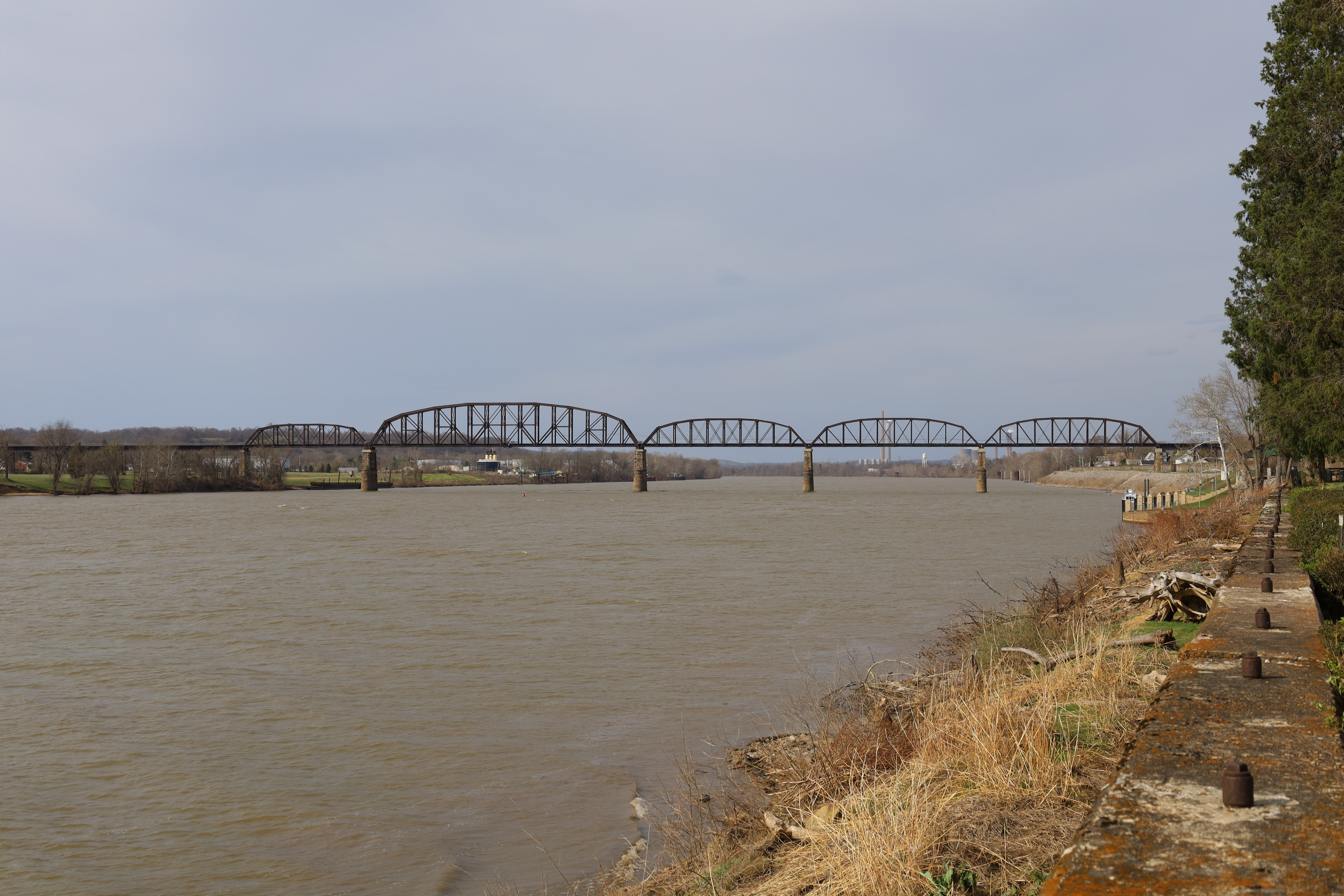
The bridge in 2022

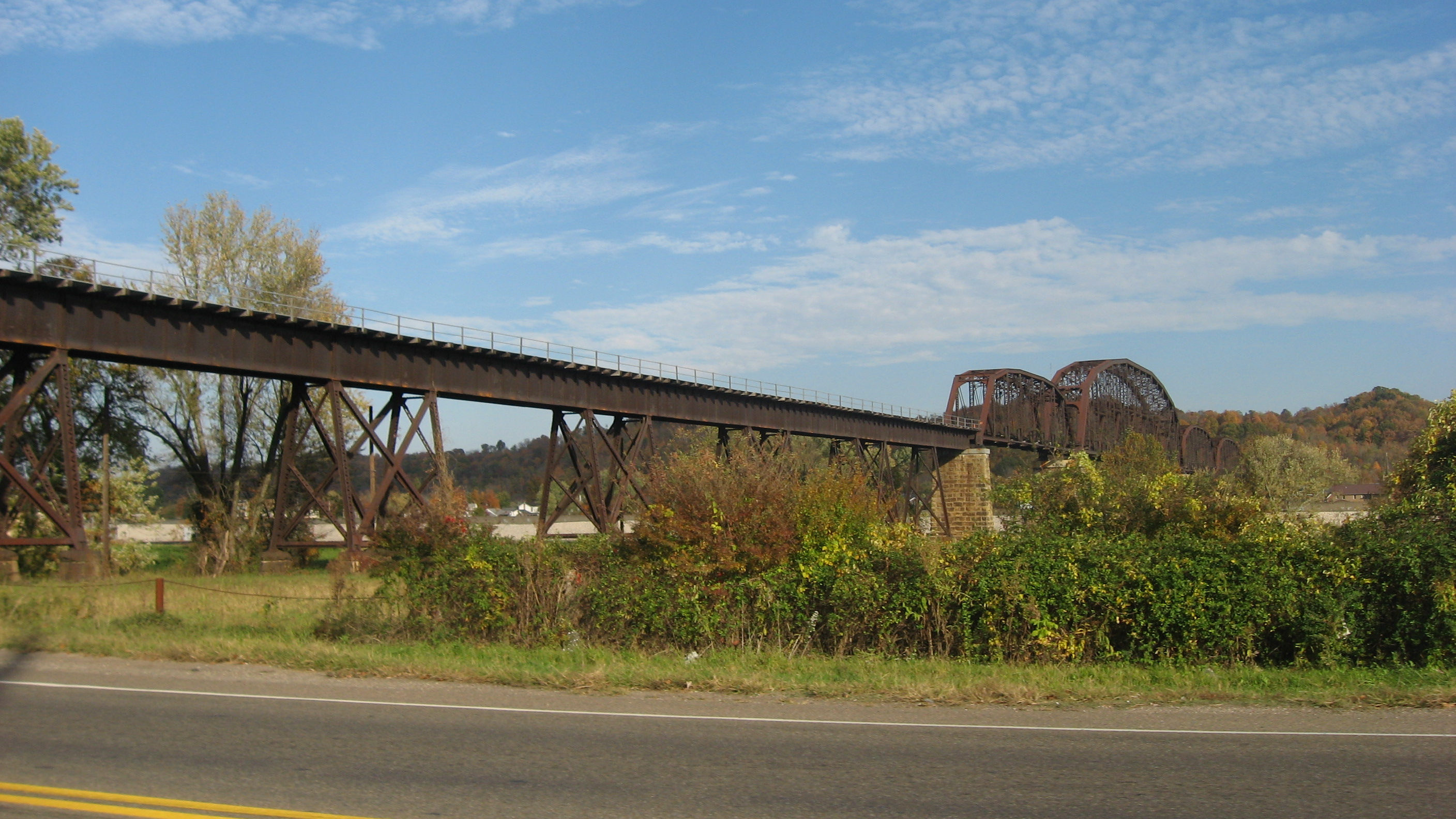
Southern side of the bridge

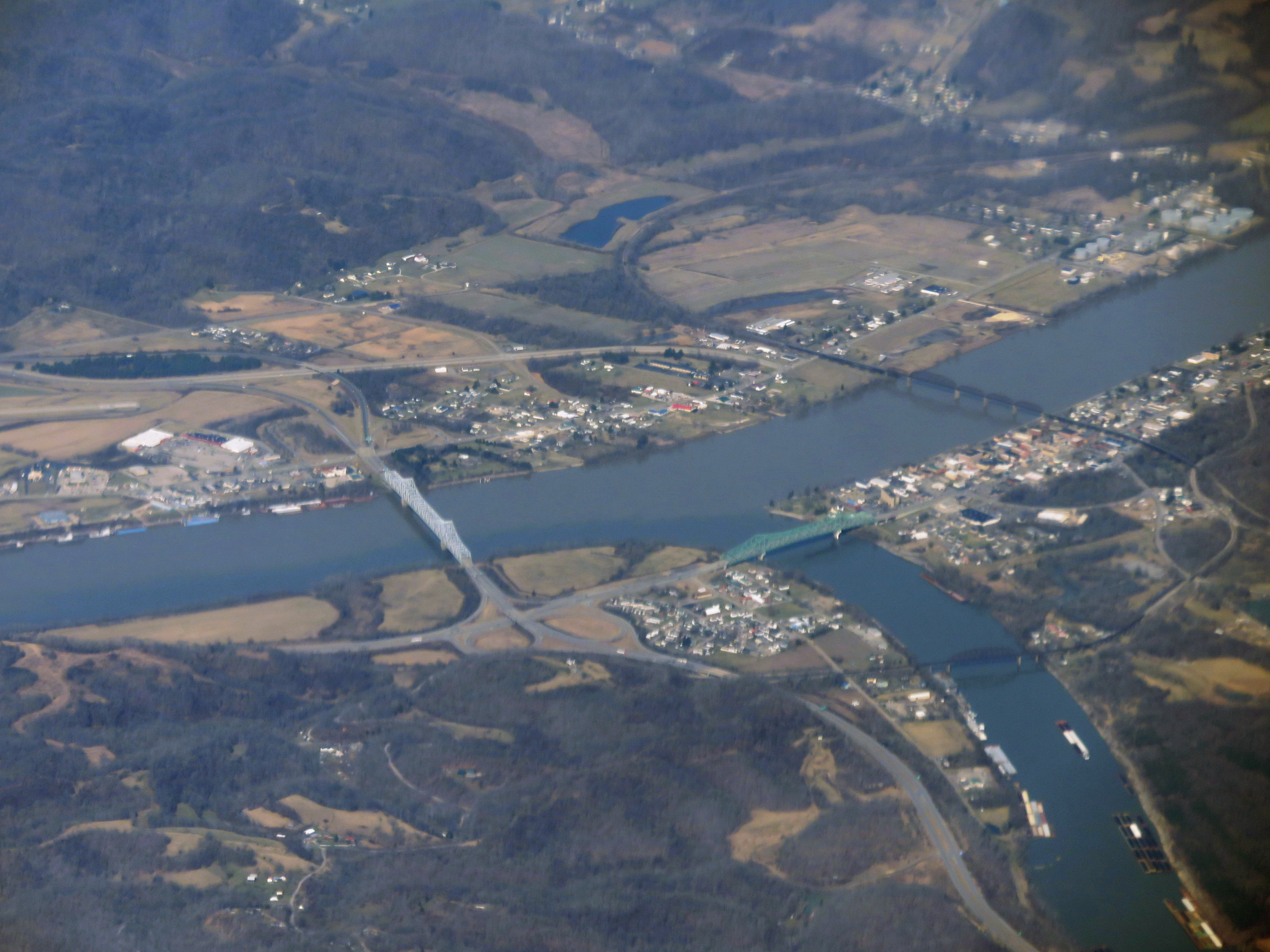
Aerial view of the bridge (right) in 2019

The Point Pleasant Rail Bridge is a truss bridge that carries the West Virginia Secondary over the Ohio River between Gallia County, Ohio and Point Pleasant, West Virginia. At the present time, the bridge is being used by the Kanawha River Railroad for transporting goods from point to point via rail, but it was once used by Norfolk Southern, Conrail, Penn Central, and the New York Central Railroad.

The bridge was adjacent to the Silver Bridge before the latter collapsed in 1967.

== See also ==
- List of crossings of the Ohio River
