= Pomeroy Subdivision =

Railway line in Ohio

The Pomeroy Subdivision is a railroad line owned by CSX Transportation in the U.S. state of Ohio. The line runs from Gallipolis, Ohio, to Middleport, Ohio, for a total of 8.9 miles (14.3 km). At both its west and east ends, the line continues as the Kanawha River Railroad West Virginia Secondary.

== See also ==
- List of CSX Transportation lines
