= Thurmond station =

Train station in Thurmond, West Virginia, United States

Thurmond, WV
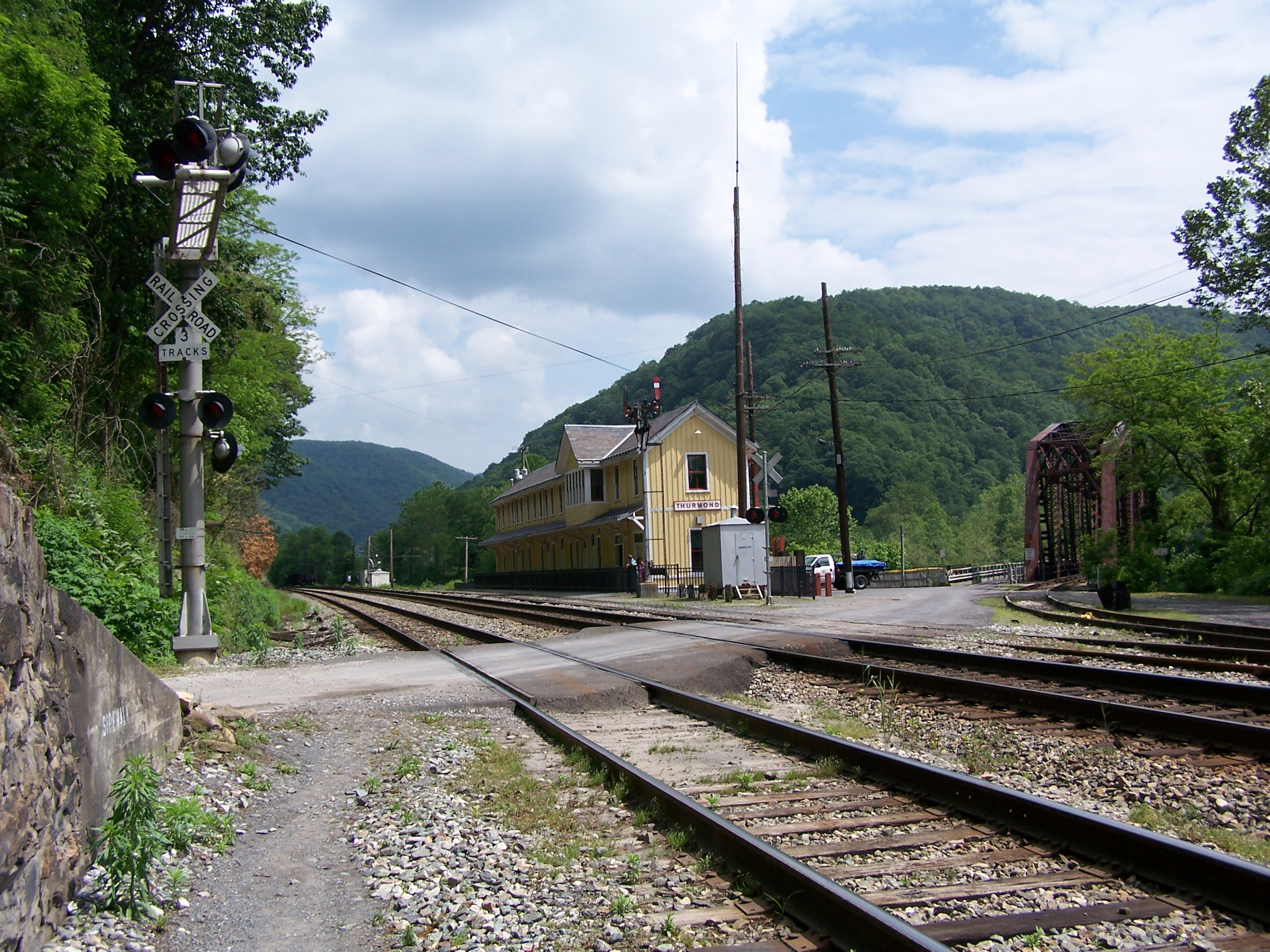
- Looking southeast across the train tracks towards the Thurmond station building

General information
- Location: County Route 25 & County Route 2 Thurmond, West Virginia; United States
- Owner: National Park Service
- Line: CSX New River Subdivision
- Platforms: 1 side platform
- Tracks: 3 (1 unused)

Construction
- Structure type: At-grade
- Parking: Yes, extremely limited
- Accessible: Yes

Other information
- Station code: Amtrak: THN

History
- Opened: 1897, 1904, 1977 (Amtrak)
- Rebuilt: 1995

Passengers
- FY 2025: 593 (Amtrak)

Services
Preceding station	Amtrak	Following station
Montgomery toward Chicago	Cardinal	Prince toward New York
Former services
Preceding station	Amtrak	Following station
Charleston toward Chicago	James Whitcomb Riley 1977	Prince toward Washington, D.C.
Preceding station	Chesapeake and Ohio Railway	Following station
Hawks Nest toward Cincinnati	Main Line	Prince toward Washington, D.C. or Phoebus
Harvey toward Mt. Hope or Minden	Loup Creek Branch	Terminus
- Thurmond Chesapeake and Ohio Railway Station
- U.S. Historic district – Contributing property
- Location: Thurmond, West Virginia, USA
- Coordinates: 37°57′26″N 81°04′44″W
- Built: 1905
- Architects: Chesapeake and Ohio Railway
- Part of: Thurmond Historic District (ID84003520)
- Added to NRHP: January 27, 1984
Location

Thurmond station is a train station in Thurmond, West Virginia, United States, that is served by Amtrak, the national railroad passenger system. The Cardinal, which runs three times each week between Chicago, Illinois and Washington, DC, passes by the station three times each week in both directions. The station is on CSX Transportation's New River Line and is located on the east bank of the New River.

== Ridership ==
Amtrak train 51 arriving at Thurmond

It is one of Amtrak's least-busy stations, it was the second least-busy for fiscal year 2006, after Greenfield Village, Michigan, which was less traveled because it had been discontinued from the Amtrak regular schedule in April 2006 (being open only to groups after that point). Of the 509 stations served by Amtrak in fiscal year 2012, Thurmond was again the second least-used station, just ahead of Sanderson, Texas. In fiscal year 2023, however, Thurmond was the fourth least-used station.

In 2022, the Amtrak station in Thurmond, WV saw 399 passengers served, compared to 285 in 2018. In 2023, 466 passengers were served at the Thurmond station.

As of 2024, due to the low annual ridership in Thurmond, the station is unstaffed, there is no waiting room, and no in-person ticket booth or kiosk.

== History ==
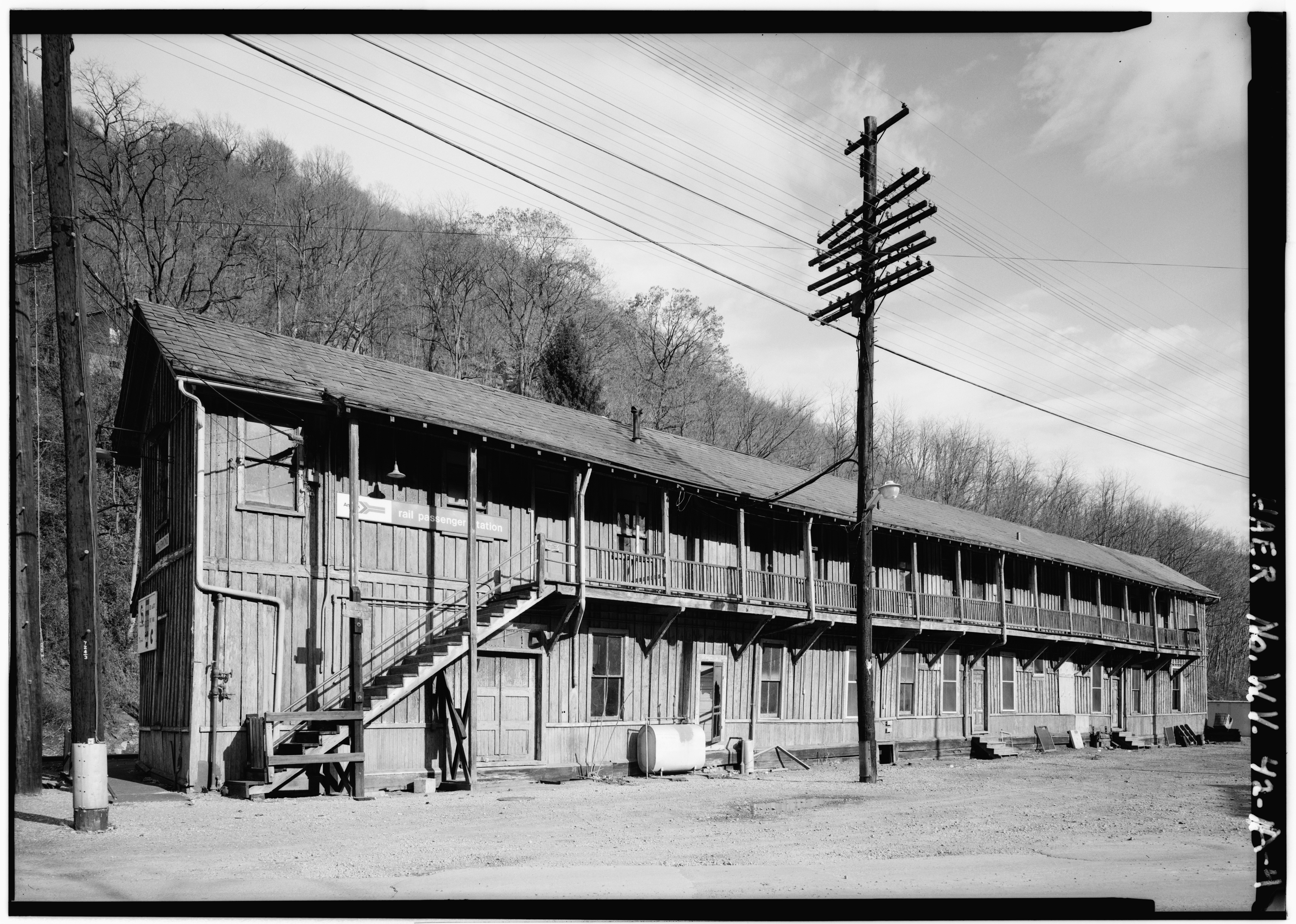
Thurmont Depot before 1968.

Thurmont Depot in 2026.

Thurmond received its first train station in 1897 which burned down in 1903. A new station was built in 1904. The long, narrow two-story slate-roofed wooden station, built by the Chesapeake and Ohio Railway, houses a railroad museum and a visitor center for the New River Gorge National River. The depot features a projecting bay that served as a signal tower. The interior originally possessed three waiting rooms: one for white men, one for white women, and one for African Americans. The station housed office spaces in the 1960's, which were operational until the mid 1980's. The building was renovated in 1995. It is a contributing structure in the Thurmond Historic District. In 2023, a new small accessible platform was constructed to accommodate passengers with reduced mobility.
