= Charleston station (West Virginia) =

Active intercity railroad station in Charleston, Kanawha County, West Virginia

Charleston, WV
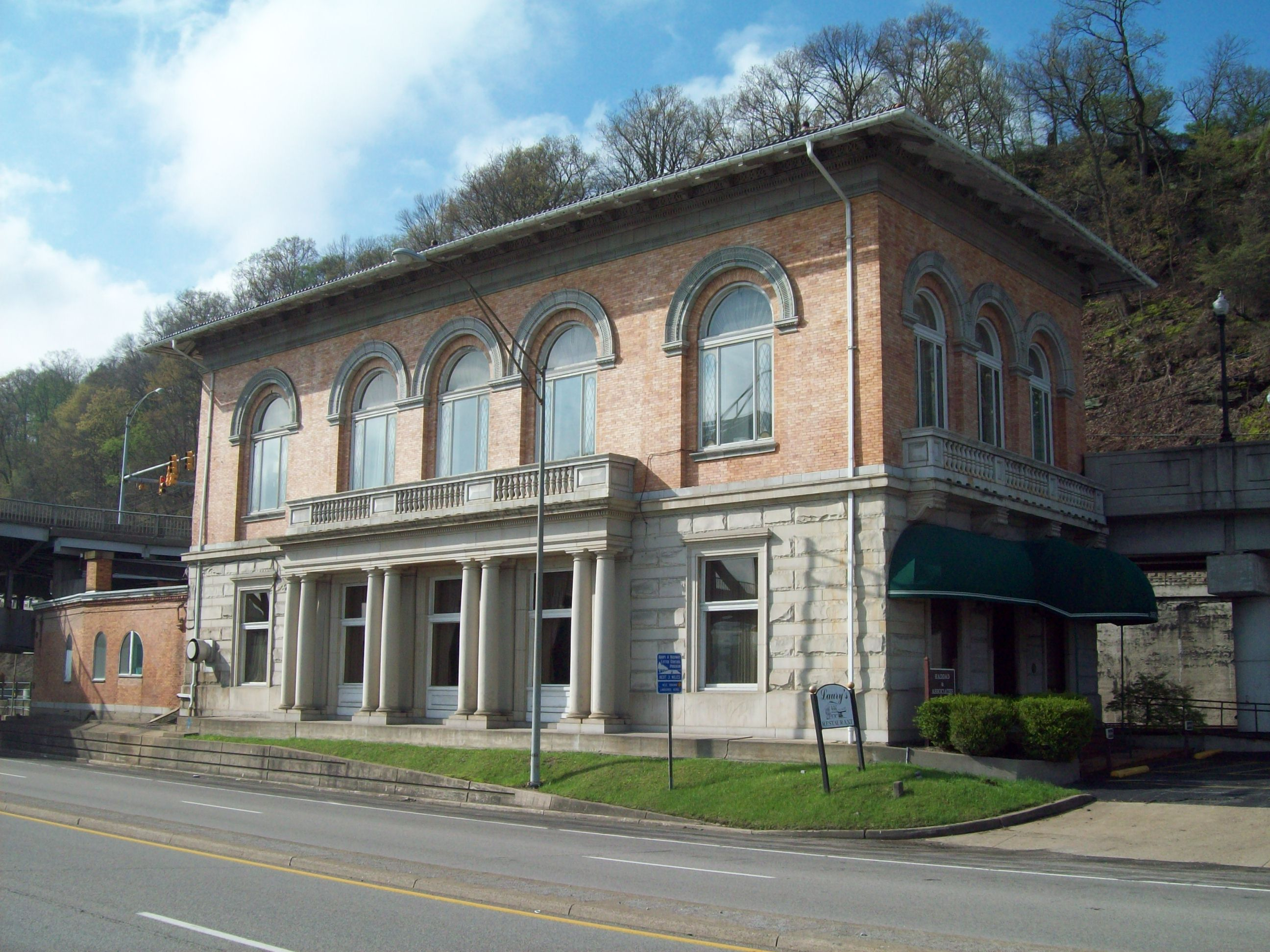
- Charleston station, April 2009

General information
- Location: 350 MacCorkle Avenue Southeast; Charleston, West Virginia; United States
- Coordinates: 38°20′47″N 81°38′18″W
- Owner: General Corporation
- Line: CSX Kanawha Subdivision
- Platforms: 1 side platform
- Tracks: 2
- Connections: Kanawha Valley Regional Transportation Authority

Construction
- Parking: Yes
- Accessible: Yes

Other information
- Station code: Amtrak: CHW

History
- Opened: 1905

Passengers
- 2018: 11,251 ▲14.7%
- FY 2025: 7,167 (Amtrak)

Services
Preceding station	Amtrak	Following station
Huntington toward Chicago	Cardinal	Montgomery toward New York
Former services
Preceding station	Amtrak	Following station
Huntington toward Chicago	James Whitcomb Riley 1974–1977	Thurmond toward Washington, D.C.
Huntington toward Chicago	James Whitcomb Riley and George Washington 1971–1974	Prince toward Washington, D.C. or Newport News
Preceding station	Chesapeake and Ohio Railway	Following station
Barboursville toward Cincinnati	Main Line	Cabin Creek toward Washington, D.C. or Phoebus
- Chesapeake and Ohio Depot
- U.S. National Register of Historic Places
- Area: 0.5 acres (0.2 ha)
- Architect: J.C. & A.L. Pennock
- Architectural style: Classical Revival, Beaux Arts
- MPS: South Hills MRA
- NRHP reference No.: 84000782
- Added to NRHP: October 26, 1984
Location

Charleston station is an active intercity railroad station in Charleston, Kanawha County, West Virginia. Located on MacCorkle Avenue Southeast, the station services trains of Amtrak's Cardinal between New York Penn Station and Chicago Union Station. The two trains (nos. 50 (eastbound) and 51 (westbound)), make stops in Charleston on Wednesdays, Fridays and Sundays. Charleston station contains a single 800-foot (240 m) concrete side platform and has a station depot that provides a waiting room for customers.

The station depot, built by the Chesapeake and Ohio Railway in 1905, is on the National Register of Historic Places.

== Description ==
The station was originally owned by the Chesapeake & Ohio Railway. In September 2010, the station was purchased by General Corporation, a commercial real estate company based in Charleston. The station is located on the south bank of the Kanawha River, opposite downtown Charleston which lies on the north bank. Much of the station's outdoor space is covered by the South Side Bridge which allows both vehicular and pedestrian traffic to access the downtown areas. A fine dining establishment, Laury's Restaurant, occupies much of the station's interior.

It was listed on the National Register of Historic Places in 1984 as the Chesapeake and Ohio Depot and part of the South Hills Multiple Resource Area. It is a two-story, brick and stone structure in the Neo-Classical Revival style. The facade features a shallow pavilion of paired Roman Doric columns facing the Kanawha River. It also has a low hipped, tile-covered roof with bracketed deep eaves.

Budget cuts in 2018 eliminated staffing of the station by an Amtrak station agent. Staffing of the station was reinstated in October 2020. Tickets to and from Charleston must be purchased in advance or from the ticket agent, as there are no Quik-Trak kiosks available. The station also provides checked baggage service. Amtrak completed upgrades at Charleston station in 2023 as part of a $6.4 million project. The company installed a 800-foot (240 m) long concrete platform, along with fresh lighting and signage. A storm water system and new guardrails, along with new pathways and bird netting were added. Parking spots compliant with the Americans with Disabilities Act of 1990 were installed. The project also upgraded the station depot, replacing the roof and renovating the restrooms and waiting room. A ribbon cutting ceremony occurred on October 12, 2023.

== See also ==
- List of Amtrak stations
- National Register of Historic Places listings in Kanawha County, West Virginia
