= Prince station =

Amtrak station in Prince, West Virginia

Prince, WV
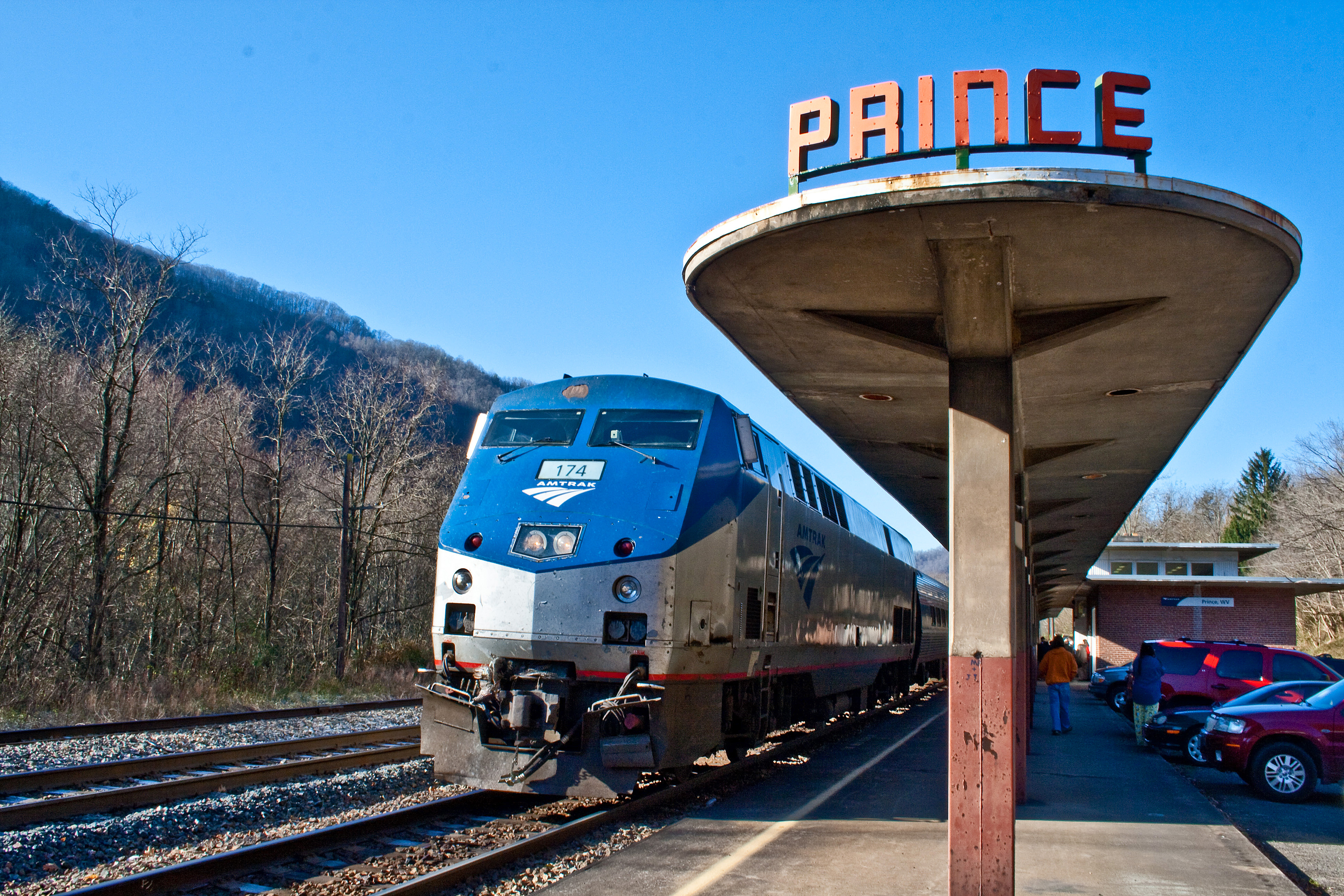
- Eastbound Cardinal stopped at Prince station in 2009

General information
- Location: 5034 Stanaford Road (WV 41); Prince, West Virginia; United States
- Coordinates: 37°51′24″N 81°03′38″W
- Owner: Fayette County Commission
- Line: CSX New River Subdivision
- Platforms: 1 side platform
- Tracks: 2

Construction
- Parking: Yes
- Accessible: Yes
- Architectural style: Art Moderne

Other information
- Status: Unstaffed
- Station code: Amtrak: PRC

History
- Opened: 1886; 140 years ago
- Rebuilt: 1915; 1945–May 4, 1946

Passengers
- FY 2025: 1,645 (Amtrak)

Services
Preceding station	Amtrak	Following station
Thurmond toward Chicago	Cardinal	Hinton toward New York
Former services
Preceding station	Amtrak	Following station
Thurmond toward Chicago	James Whitcomb Riley 1974–1977	Hinton toward Washington, D.C.
Charleston toward Chicago	James Whitcomb Riley and George Washington 1971–1974	Hinton toward Washington, D.C. or Newport News
Preceding station	Chesapeake and Ohio Railway	Following station
Thurmond toward Cincinnati	Main Line	Quinnimont toward Washington, D.C. or Phoebus
Wright toward Lester	Piney Creek Branch	Quinnimont Terminus
Location

Prince station is an active intercity railroad station in the Prince section of unincorporated Fayette County, West Virginia. Located on State Route 41 (Stanaford Road) in the New River Gorge National Park and Preserve, Prince station serves trains of Amtrak's Cardinal, a service between Chicago Union Station and New York Penn Station three days a week. It also serves as the station closest to Beckley, West Virginia, which is connected via State Route 41. The station sits along the CSX New River Subdivision, which has two tracks through the area. Prince station consists of a single low-level side platform with a canopy roof. A wheelchair lift is present for those with disabilities. It also has an Art Moderne depot built in 1945–1946 alongside the platform built by the Chesapeake and Ohio Railway.

== History ==
The Chesapeake and Ohio Railway built the first facility in 1880 that was enlarged in 1891 to serve both freight and passengers. In 1942, the C&O president, Robert R. Young, saw a need for "a stylish, streamlined, and efficient passenger rail system" that led to the development of the current station.

At the local of Chamber of Commerce on December 6, 1944, Division Superintendent H.T. Brown told officials that a new train station at Prince would be built as soon as possible. Comparing it to the station depot at White Sulphur Springs, Brown emphasized that the new station would be more impressive. The new station would involve a 1,080-foot (330 m) concrete platform, of which 480 feet (150 m) would be covered by a canopy. A new station depot would be built with proper waiting rooms and modern amenities, including a ladies' powder room. As part of the upgrades, a track next to State Route 41 and the standing depot from 1915 would be removed and replaced with a new driveway. Brown added that the War Production Board would release materials to the railroad for the beginning of construction in early 1945. At the same time, added speculation grew that the bridge across the New River on State Route 41 would have its toll removed.

The station opened on May 4, 1946 to passenger traffic, with a formal dedication held on June 26.

== Design ==
The design of the Prince train station is Art Moderne, similar to Art Deco, with a horizontal design, emphasizing movement and sleekness. Built in 1946, the architectural firm was Garfield, Harris, Robinson, & Schafer that was headquartered in Cleveland, Ohio. The main terminal building is 125 by 22 feet (38.1 m × 6.7 m) and the waiting area features tall ceilings and large windows, as well as a large wall mural depicting mining and the importance of coal. The terrazzo floor has embedded in it the original C&O “Chessie” kitten logo.

The depot has a minimum of ornamentation. Each end of the 500-foot (152 m) canopy is rounded and topped with Streamline Moderne stainless steel lettering spelling out "Prince". The canopy is oriented so that the sun would warm waiting passengers in the winter time, while shading them in the summer.

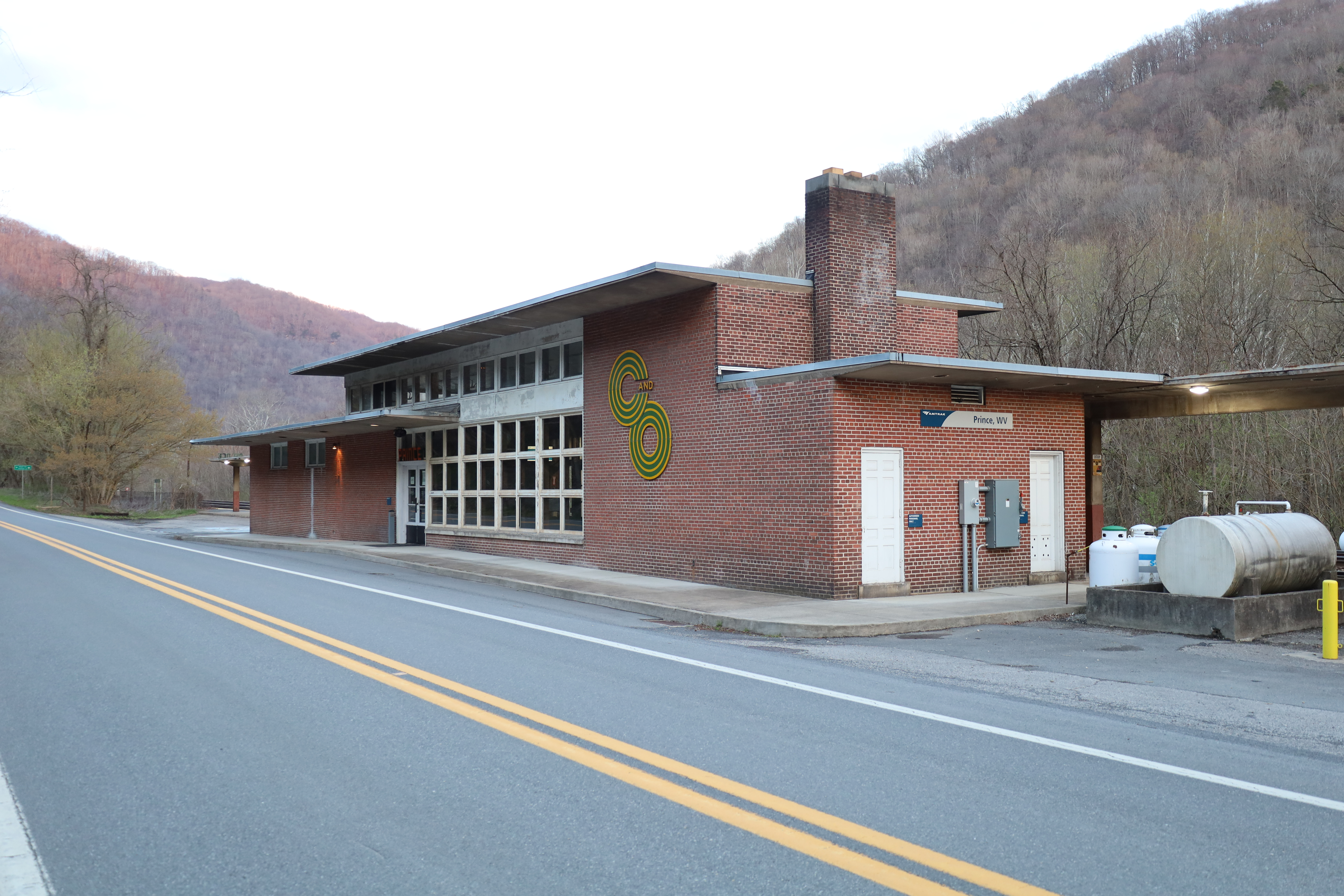
Building overview in 2022

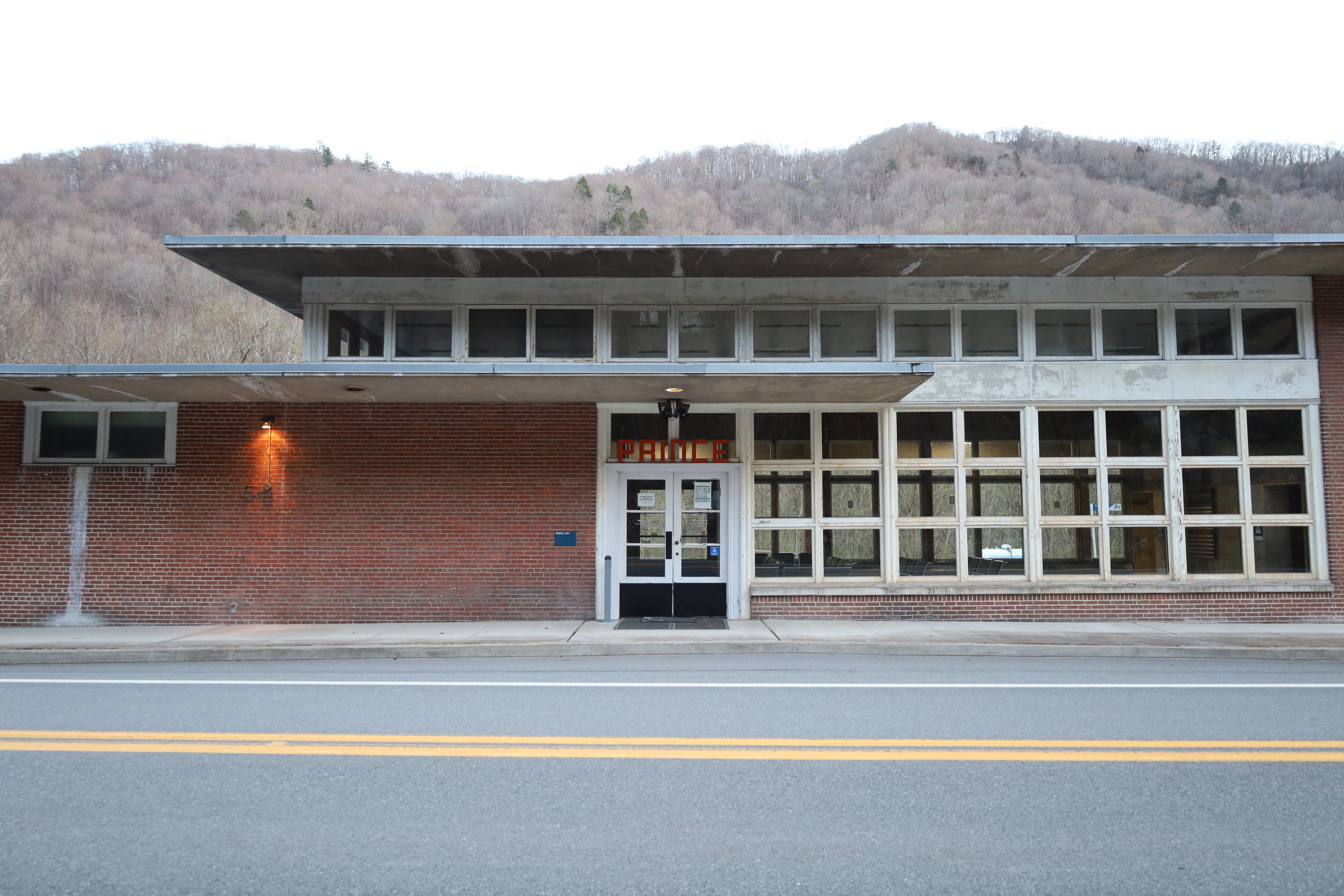
Front entrance in 2022

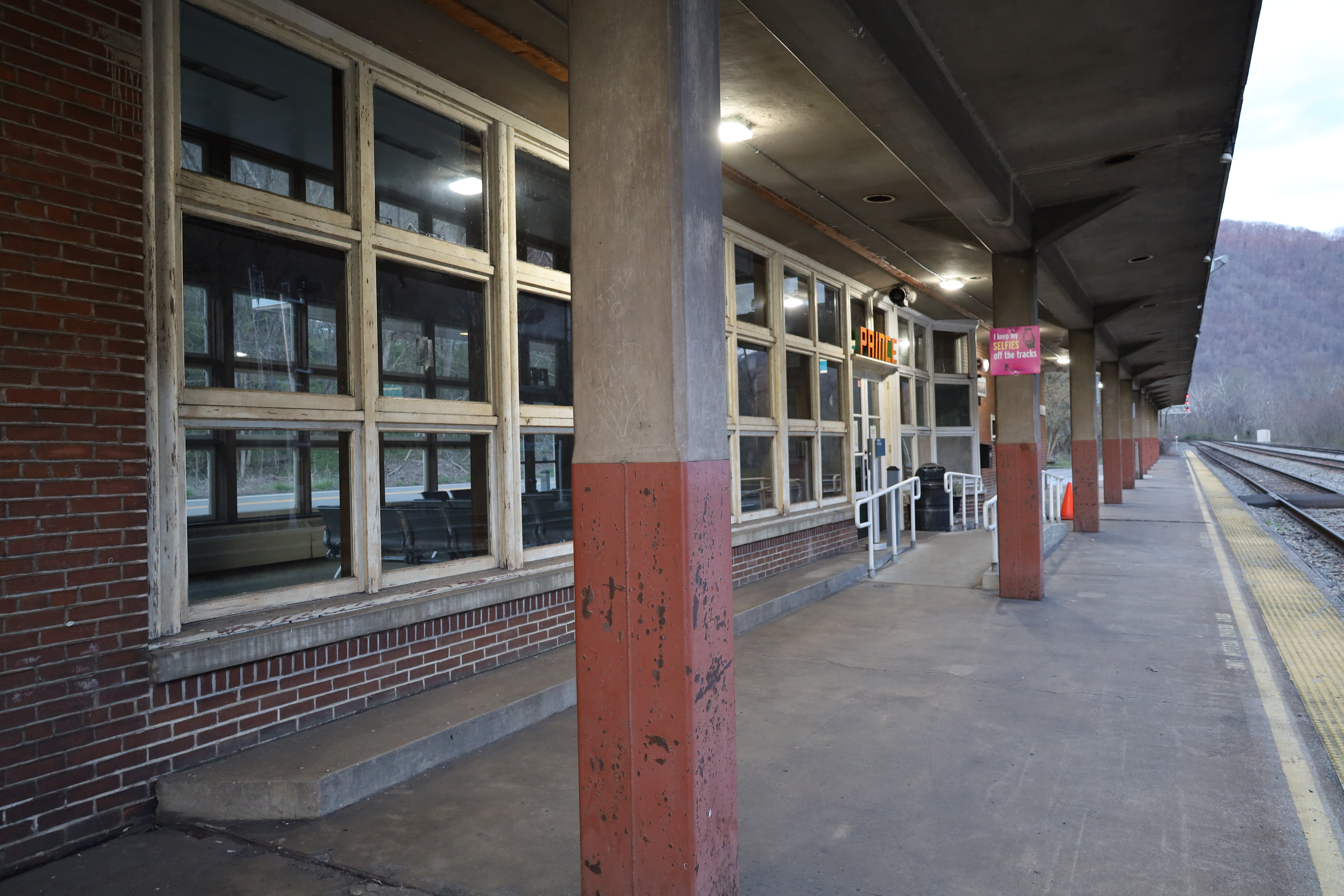
Passenger platform side in 2022

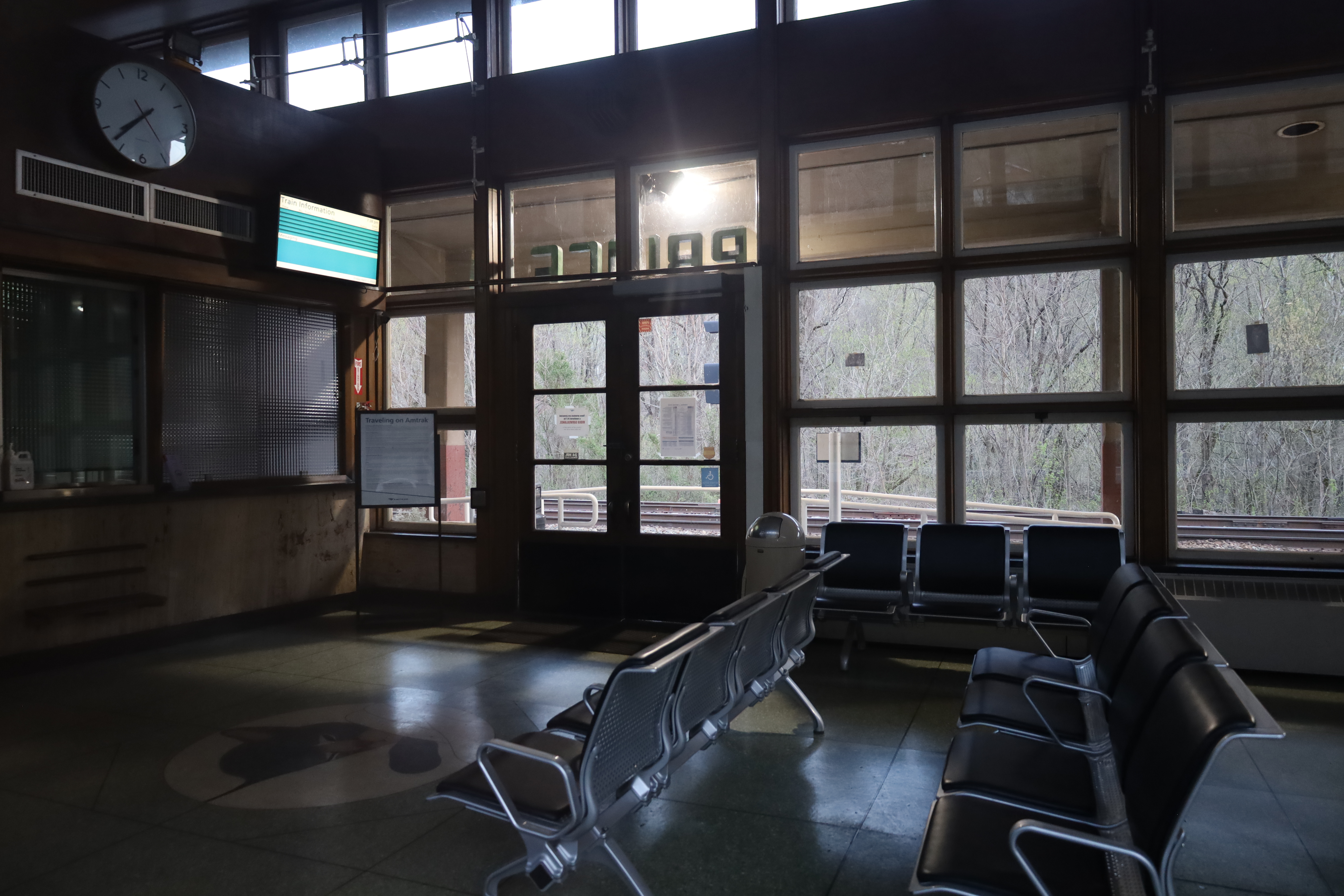
Interior in 2022

== Future ==
With an upsurge in activities in the New River Gorge National Park and Preserve, and the development of the Summit Bechtel Family National Scout Reserve that is located 7 miles (11 km) from the station, plans were underway for improvements to the passenger facility as of late 2013.
