= Raleigh Southwestern and Winding Gulf Subdivision =

Railway line in West Virginia

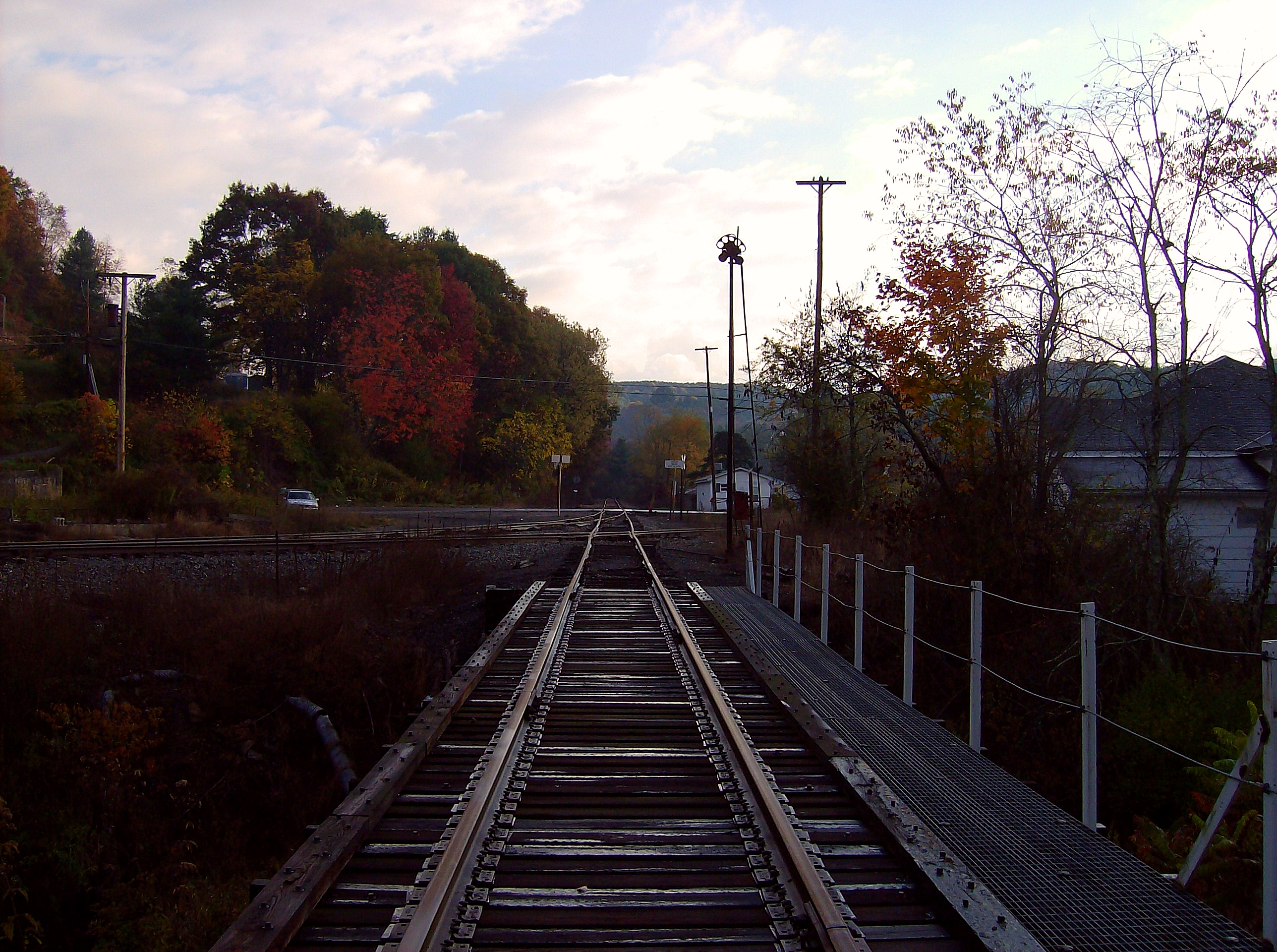
Junction between the CSX Raleigh Southwestern and Winding Gulf Subdivision and the Norfolk Southern Winding Gulf Branch at their respective ends in 2008

The Raleigh Southwestern & Winding Creek Subdivision is a railroad line owned by CSX Transportation in the U.S. state of West Virginia. It was formerly part of the CSX Huntington East Division. It became part of the CSX Florence Division on June 20, 2016.

The line runs from Raleigh, West Virginia, to Pemberton, West Virginia, for a total of 5.5 miles (8.9 km). At its east end the line branches off the Piney Creek Subdivision, and at its west end the line becomes Norfolk Southern's Winding Gulf Branch of the Princeton–Deepwater District.

The line was completed in 1912 and connected with the Winding Gulf Branch, then part of the Virginian Railway, in 1917.

== See also ==
- List of CSX Transportation lines
