= Marietta Subdivision =

Railway line in West Virginia and Ohio

- Map

Overview
- Status: Active
- Owner: CSX
- Locale: West Virginia, Ohio
- Termini: Belpre; Marietta

Service
- Type: Freight rail
- System: CSX
- Operator: Belpre Industrial Parkersburg Railroad

Technical
- Number of tracks: 1-2
- Track gauge: 4 ft 8 1/2 in (1,435 mm)

The Marietta Subdivision is a railroad line owned by CSX Transportation and operated by Belpre Industrial Parkersburg Railroad in the U.S. states of West Virginia and Ohio. The line runs from Parkersburg, West Virginia, west to Belpre, Ohio, and north via Marietta to Relief (near Beverly, Ohio) along a former Baltimore and Ohio Rail Road line. Its south end is at a connection to the Ohio River Subdivision; the line crosses the Ohio River on the Parkersburg Bridge between Parkersburg and Belpre.

== History ==
The short piece of the Marietta Subdivision from Moore Junction northeast to Harmar (part of Marietta) opened in 1857 as part of the Marietta and Cincinnati Railroad. The Union Railroad, from Moore Junction south to Belpre, opened in 1860. The Parkersburg Bridge opened in 1871, connecting Belpre to the B&O's Parkersburg Branch. In the 1880s or 1890s, the Zanesville and Ohio River Railway built from Harmar northwest past the current end of the line towards Zanesville. The lines became part of the B&O and CSX through leases and mergers. The Parkersburg Branch east from Parkersburg (formerly part of the Monongah Division) is now gone; the only connection there is with the Ohio River Subdivision. In 2020, CSX leased the Marietta Sub to Cathcart Rail, who operate the line under the Belpre Industrial Parkersburg Railroad subsidiary.
