= Alleghany Subdivision =

CSX rail line in Virginia and West Virginia

The Alleghany Subdivision is a railroad line owned by CSX Transportation in the U.S. states of Virginia and West Virginia. It was formerly part of the CSX Huntington East Division. It became part of the CSX Florence Division on June 20, 2016. The line runs from Clifton Forge, Virginia, to Hinton, West Virginia, for a total of 78.6 miles (126.5 km). At its north end it continues south from the James River Subdivision and at its south end it continues south as the New River Subdivision.

== See also ==
- List of CSX Transportation lines
