= Rivanna Subdivision =

Railway line in Virginia

The Rivanna Subdivision is a railroad line owned by CSX Transportation in the U.S. state of Virginia. It was formerly part of the CSX Huntington East Division. It became part of the CSX Florence Division on June 20, 2016. The line runs from Richmond, Virginia, to Gladstone, Virginia, for a total of 119.2 miles. From its eastern terminus in Richmond, the line continues east as the Peninsula Subdivision and at its west end the line continues west as the James River Subdivision.

== See also ==
- List of CSX Transportation lines
