= Pond Fork Subdivision =

Railway line in West Virginia

The Pond Fork Subdivision is a railroad line owned by CSX Transportation in the U.S. state of West Virginia. It was formerly part of the CSX Huntington East Division. It became part of the CSX Florence Division on June 20, 2016. The line runs from Danville, West Virginia, to Harris, West Virginia, for a total of 29.1 miles (46.8 km). At its south end it continues north from the Coal River Subdivision and at its north end the track comes to an end.

== See also ==
- List of CSX Transportation lines
