= Flat Top Mountain (West Virginia) =

Mountain in West Virginia, United States of America

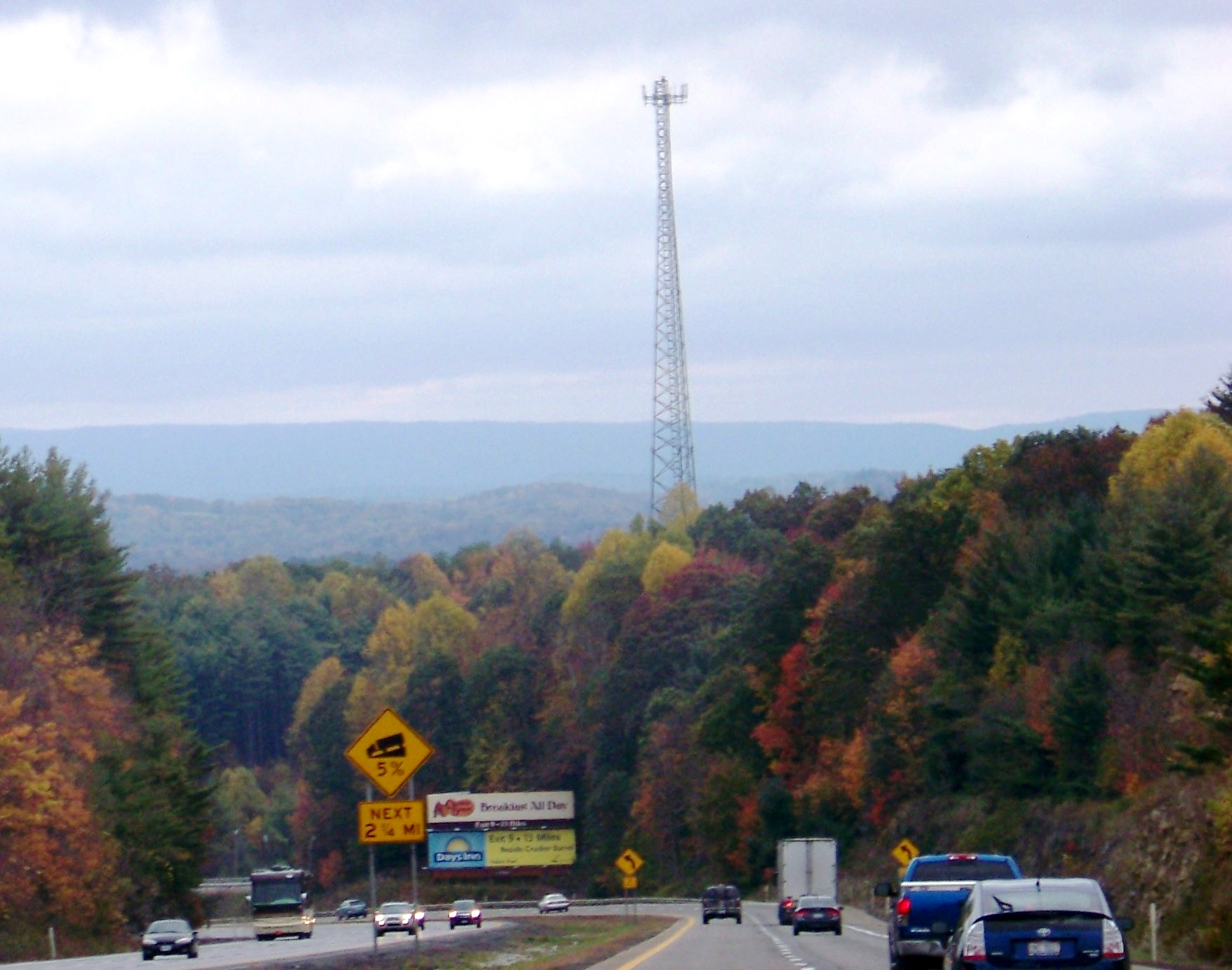
- View down Interstate 77 from the crest of Flat Top Mountain towards the Bluestone River valley and East River Mountain beyond

Highest point
- Elevation: 3,252 ft (991 m)
- Coordinates: 37°35′26″N 81°6′53″W

Geography
- Location: Southern West Virginia, United States
- Topo map: USGS Mercer County WV

Flat Top Mountain is a mountain ridge within the Allegheny Mountains in Southern West Virginia, United States.

== Geology ==
Its highest point is 3,560 feet (1,090 m) at Huff Knob near Flat Top, West Virginia. Other peaks include Bluff Mountain, Indian Grave Mountain, Bald Knob, Rich Knob, and Pilot Knob. Its summit contains a 40-square-mile tableland of Guyandotte sandstone, giving rise to its name.

The mountain ridge locally forms the boundary between the Allegheny Plateau to the northwest and the Ridge-and-Valley Appalachians to the southeast. To the southeast, it descends steeply to the Bluestone River valley, while to the northwest it descends more slowly, with several rivers flowing to the Kanawha and Ohio Rivers. Beckley, West Virginia lies on its northwestern slopes.

Beyond its northeastern end lies White Oak Mountain and then the New River Gorge, beyond which the Yew Mountains continue the Allegheny Plateau/Ridge-and-Valley border. At its southwestern end, Big Stone Ridge forms an extension of Flat Top Mountain, forming the southernmost range of the Allegheny Mountains.

It is not to be confused with two other mountains in West Virginia of the same name, in Hardy and Monroe counties.

== Culture and economy ==
Flat Top Mountain's ridge forms the border between several counties: Wyoming and Raleigh counties are at its northwest, while McDowell, Mercer, and Summers counties are at its southeast. Parts of the Pocahontas Coalfield lie beneath it, and the mountain has a long history of coal mining. Most agriculture on the mountain is devoted to livestock and Christmas tree farming. Recreational facilities include Winterplace Ski Resort and Camp Creek State Park.

The ridge of Flat Top Mountain is crossed north-to-south at Clark's Gap by the Norfolk Southern Railway's Princeton–Deepwater District, which was originally the Virginian Railway's main line. The line served to deliver coal to consumers on the East Coast. In 2015, this segment of the line was mothballed due to decreases in coal traffic.
