= West Virginia Secondary =

The West Virginia Secondary is a rail line that connects Columbus, Ohio, to Charleston, West Virginia, and beyond to the Gauley River valley, ending in Enon, West Virginia. The line is about 250 miles long. It crosses the Ohio River over the Point Pleasant Rail Bridge.

The line was built in the late 19th century in segments by several railroads, most notably the Toledo and Ohio Central Railway and Kanawha and Michigan Railroad. These were all acquired by the New York Central Railroad in 1910, and later passed to Penn Central and then Conrail. In 1999 it became part of Norfolk Southern Railway. The majority of the line was acquired by Watco to form the Kanawha River Railroad in 2016, with the exception of a 9-mile segment owned by CSX Transportation in southeastern Ohio known as the Pomeroy Subdivision.
