= Prince, West Virginia =

- Census-designated place (CDP)
- Location in West Virginia Prince (the United States)
- Coordinates: 37°51′32″N 81°03′13″W
- Country: United States
- States: West Virginia
- County: Fayette County

Area
  - Total: 2.018 sq mi (5.23 km^{2})
  - Land: 1.828 sq mi (4.73 km^{2})
  - Water: 0.190 sq mi (0.49 km^{2})

Population (2020)
  - Total: 115
  - Density: 62.9/sq mi (24.3/km^{2})
- ZIP code: 25907

Prince is a census-designated place (CDP) in Fayette County, West Virginia, United States. As of the 2020 census, its population was 115 (slightly down from 116 at the 2010 census). Located at an altitude of 1,263 feet (385 m), it is served by an Amtrak station.

The community was named after William Prince, an early settler.
