= Clear Creek, West Virginia =

Unincorporated community in West Virginia, United States

- Unincorporated community
- Location within West Virginia Location within the United States
- Coordinates: 37°54′58″N 81°20′39″W
- Country: United States
- State: West Virginia
- County: Raleigh
- Elevation: 1,467 ft (447 m)

Population
  - Total: 18
- Time zone: UTC-5 (Eastern (EST))
  - Summer (DST): UTC-4 (EDT)
- ZIP code: 25044
- Area codes: 304 & 681
- GNIS feature ID: 1537386

Clear Creek is an unincorporated community in Raleigh County, West Virginia, United States. Clear Creek is 4.5 miles (7.2 km) west of Pax. Clear Creek has a post office with ZIP code 25044.

In December 2018, four people seeking to gather copper became trapped for five days in an abandoned mine near Clear Creek, the Rock House Powellton coal mine.
