= St. Albans station (West Virginia) =

- St. Albans Chesapeake and Ohio Railroad Depot
- U.S. National Register of Historic Places
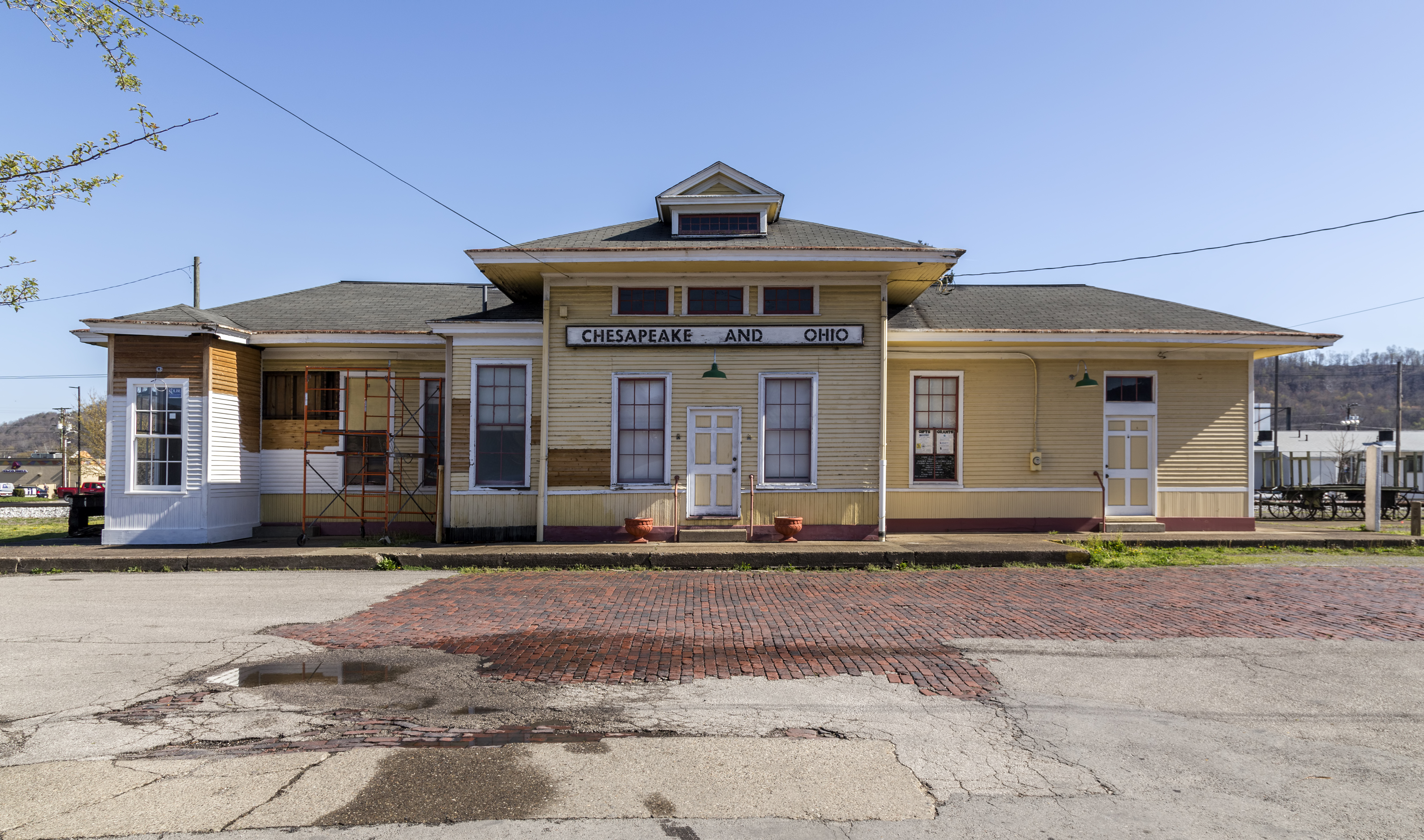
- Saint Albans Depot in 2016

- Location within West Virginia Location within the United States
- Location: 410 4th Ave., St. Albans, West Virginia
- Coordinates: 38°23′16.5″N 81°49′59″W
- Area: less than one acre
- Built: 1906
- Built by: Chesapeake and Ohio Railway
- Architectural style: Vernacular
- NRHP reference No.: 97000785
- Added to NRHP: July 9, 1997

St. Albans Chesapeake and Ohio Railroad Depot, also known as St. Albans Depot, is a historic railroad depot located at St. Albans, West Virginia. It was built in 1906 by the Chesapeake and Ohio Railway. It has a 1 1/2-story central block with one-story wings and a hipped roof. It originally had a square watch tower. The frame building is clad in clapboard siding. The station closed about 1963 and remained vacant until the city purchased the land from CSX Transportation in 1991 and CSX donated the station.

It was listed on the National Register of Historic Places in 1997.

== Passenger services ==
- Fast Flying Virginian
- Sportsman

Preceding station	Chesapeake and Ohio Railway	Following station
Hurricane toward Cincinnati	Main Line	Spring Hill toward Washington, D.C. or Phoebus
