= Sproul, West Virginia =

- Unincorporated community
- Location within West Virginia and the United States Sproul (the United States)
- Coordinates: 38°15′4″N 81°47′43″W
- Country: United States
- State: West Virginia
- County: Kanawha
- Elevation: 623 ft (190 m)
- Time zone: UTC-5 (Eastern (EST))
  - Summer (DST): UTC-4 (EDT)
- GNIS ID: 1555696

Sproul is an unincorporated community in Kanawha County, West Virginia, United States. It was also known as Big Coal.
