= Island Creek Subdivision =

Railway line in West Virginia

The Island Creek Subdivision is a railroad line owned by CSX Transportation in the U.S. state of West Virginia. The line, which was formerly owned by the Chesapeake and Ohio Railway runs from Logan, West Virginia, to Scarlet, West Virginia, for a total of 10.6 miles (17.1 km). At its east end the line continues west from the Logan Subdivision and at its west end the line comes to an end in the town Scarlet, West Virginia. Currently the last few miles of railbed are being removed by CSX..

== See also ==
- List of CSX Transportation lines
