= Short Line Subdivision (West Virginia) =

Railway line in West Virginia

Overview
- Status: Active
- Owner: CSX Transportation
- Locale: West Virginia
- Termini: Clarksburg; New Martinsville

Service
- Type: Freight rail
- System: CSX Transportation
- Operator(s): CSX Transportation

Technical
- Number of tracks: 1
- Track gauge: 4 ft 8 1/2 in (1,435 mm) standard gauge

The Short Line Subdivision is a railroad line owned and operated by CSX Transportation in the U.S. state of West Virginia. The line runs from Clarksburg west to New Martinsville along a former Baltimore and Ohio Rail Road line. Its east end is at the west end of the Bridgeport Subdivision; its west end is at the Ohio River Subdivision.

== History ==
The line was opened in 1900 by the West Virginia Short Line Railroad. It became part of the B&O and CSX through leases and mergers.
