= Coal River Subdivision =

Railroad line in West Virginia, U.S.

The Coal River Subdivision is a railroad line owned by CSX Transportation in the U.S. State of West Virginia. It was formerly part of the CSX Huntington East Division. It became part of the CSX Florence Division on June 20, 2016. The line runs from Sharples, West Virginia, to St. Albans, West Virginia, for a total of 50.6 miles (81.4 km). At its north end it continues south from the Beech Creek Industrial Track and at its south end it continues south as the Kanawha Subdivision.

== See also ==
- List of CSX Transportation lines
