= Logan Subdivision =

Railway line in West Virginia

The Logan Subdivision is a railroad line owned by CSX Transportation in the U.S. state of West Virginia. It was formerly part of the CSX Huntington East Division. It became part of the CSX Florence Division on June 20, 2016. The line runs from Barboursville, West Virginia, to Gilbert, West Virginia, for a total of 87.2 miles (140.3 km). At its north end the line continues south from the Kanawha Subdivision and at its south end the line connects with Norfolk Southern.

== See also ==
- List of CSX Transportation lines
