= New River Subdivision =

Railway line in West Virginia

The New River Subdivision is a railroad line owned by CSX Transportation in the U.S. state of West Virginia. It was formerly part of the CSX Huntington East Division. It became part of the CSX Florence Division on June 20, 2016.

The line runs from Hinton, West Virginia, to Montgomery, West Virginia, for a total of 72.9 miles (117.3 km). At its south end it continues north from the Alleghany Subdivision and at its north end it continues north as the Kanawha Subdivision.
