= Kanawha River Railroad =

Railroad in the United States

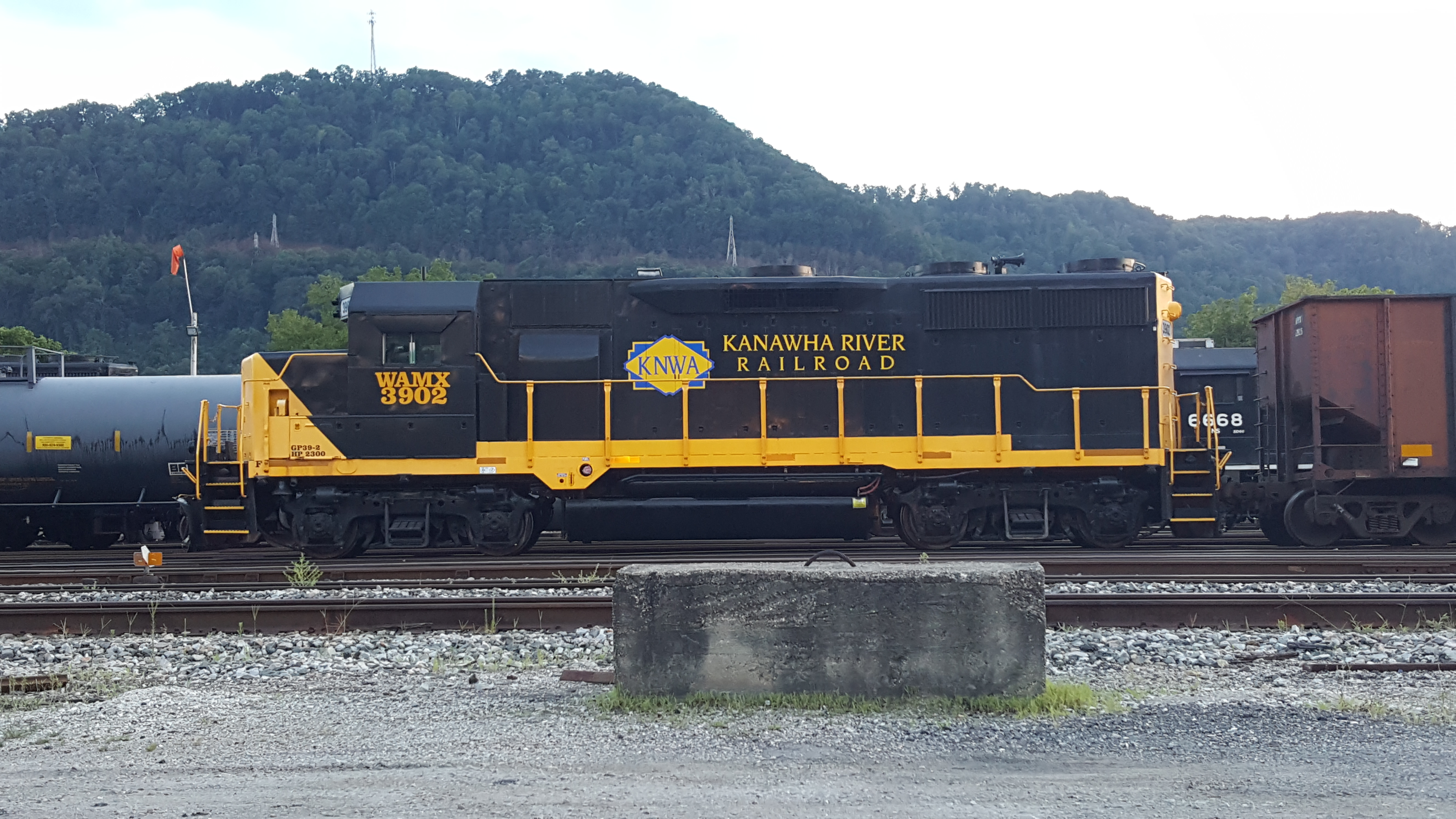
Kanawha River Railroad locomotive no. 3902 near Dickinson, West Virginia in August 2016.

The Kanawha River Railroad (reporting mark KNWA) is a common-carrier railroad in the United States. A subsidiary of Watco, it leases just under 400 miles of track in the US states of Ohio and West Virginia from Norfolk Southern. The KNWA also operates an additional 6 miles of track on the southern side of the Kanawha River, where the railroad breaks down, loads, and rebuilds coal trains before handing them off to CSX Transportation.

The railroad uses rebuilt EMD SD45s and EMD SD60s for manifest trains, EMD GP39Vs for switching and local duties, and their fleet of SD60s and SD60Ms as helper power on coal trains, with leased power from Norfolk Southern on the coal trains which mostly lead but sometimes don’t.

The railroads roster includes 3 GP39Vs, No.s 3901, 3902, and 3921.

3 SD45s, mechanically rebuilt into EMD SD40M-2s, No.s 4211, 4213, and 4221.

10 SD60s, No.s 6000-6011 excluding WAMX 6007 and 6004, 6007 was transferred to Kansas and Oklahoma Railroad then shortly after it went to the Austin Western Railroad, 6012 got scrapped In November of 2025 due to engine issues , 6004 has been stripped for parts and is sitting in Dickinson yard.

6 SD60Ms, No.s 6047, 6050, 6051, 6052, 6053, and 6059. 6053 and 6059 are still in patched Union Pacific paint schemes. 6047 and 6051 are Phase 1 SD60Ms (triclops) while the rest are Phase 2(two windows)
