= Kanawha Subdivision =

Railway line in West Virginia and Kentucky

The Kanawha Subdivision is a railroad line owned by CSX Transportation in the U.S. states of West Virginia and Kentucky. It was formerly part of the CSX Huntington East Division. It became part of the CSX Florence Division on June 20, 2016. The line runs from Montgomery, West Virginia, to Russell, Kentucky, for a total of 94.7 miles (152.4 km). At its east end it continues west from the New River Subdivision and at its west end it continues west as the Russell Terminal Subdivision of the Louisville Division.

== See also ==
- List of CSX Transportation lines
