= List of crossings of the Great Miami River =

This is a complete list of current bridges and other crossings of the Great Miami River from its mouth at the Ohio River to its source at Indian Lake.

== Crossings ==
All locations are in Ohio unless otherwise specified. In places where municipalities overlap with townships, both are listed. Pedestrian-only bridges are marked in italics.

Image	Crossing	Location	Opened	Coordinates	Notes
Hamilton County
	CSX Transportation Indiana Subdivision	Dearborn County, Indiana–Miami Township			
	Lost Bridge; Lawrenceburg Road	Whitewater Township–Miami Township			near Elizabethtown
	Central Railroad of Indiana	Whitewater Township–Miami Township			near Hooven and Cleves
	US 50 (Louisville Pike)	Whitewater Township–Miami Township		39.1700°N 84.7584°W	near Hooven and Cleves
	I-275 / US 52	Whitewater Township–Miami Township		39.2100°N 84.6974°W	
	Harrison Avenue	Whitewater Township–Colerain Township			near Miamitown; Miamitown bridge collapse
	Blue Rock Road	Crosby Township–Colerain Township			near New Baltimore
	Colerain Road	Crosby Township–Colerain Township			near Ross
Butler County–Hamilton County
	US 27 / SR 126	Ross Township–Colerain Township		39.3122°N 84.6311°W	near Ross
Butler County
	Pershing Avenue	Hamilton			
	CSX Transportation Indianapolis Subdivision	Hamilton			
	SR 129 / SR 177 (Main Street)	Hamilton		39.4015°N 84.5655°W	
	Black Street	Hamilton			
	US 127 (Third Street / Riverside Drive)	St. Clair Township–Fairfield Township		39.4250°N 84.5405°W	near New Miami
	CSX Transportation Toledo Subdivision	St. Clair Township–Fairfield Township			near New Miami
	CSX Transportation Middletown Subdivision	St. Clair Township–Fairfield Township			
	Liberty Fairfield Road	Madison Township–Fairfield Township			near Woodsdale
	SR 73 (State Street / Oxford State Road)	Trenton–Lemon Township		39.4818°N 84.4421°W	near Excello
	SR 122 (Middletown Eaton Road / Central Avenue)	Madison Township–Middletown		39.5203°N 84.4130°W	near West Middletown
	SR 4 (Germantown Road)	Madison Township–Middletown		39.5398°N 84.3840°W	
Warren County–Butler County
	Norfolk Southern Railway Dayton District	Franklin Township–Middletown			
Warren County
	Norfolk Southern Railway Franklin Industrial Track	Franklin (Franklin Township)			
	SR 123 (Second Street)	Franklin (Franklin Township)		39.5631°N 84.3048°W	
	Central Avenue / Kenneth Koons Boulevard	Carlisle–Franklin (Franklin Township)			
Montgomery County
	Chautauqua Road	Miami Township			
	Norfolk Southern Railway Dayton District	Miami Township			
	Linden Avenue	Miamisburg (Miami Township)			
	SR 725 (Upper Miamisburg Road)	Miamisburg (Miami Township)		39.6457°N 84.2894°W	
	Farmersville West Carrollton Road	West Carrollton			
	Main Street	Moraine			
	Dryden Road	Moraine			
	Norfolk Southern Railway Dayton District	Moraine–Dayton			
	I-75	Dayton		39.7300°N 84.2066°W	
	Stewart Street	Dayton			
	US 35	Dayton		39.7500°N 84.1977°W	
	Washington Street	Dayton			
	Norfolk Southern Railway Dayton District CSX Transportation Toledo Subdivision	Dayton			
	5th Street	Dayton		39.7546°N 84.2020°W	
	I-75/ SR 4	Dayton		39.7559°N 84.2034°W	
	3rd Street	Dayton			
	1st Street / Salem Avenue	Dayton			
	Monument Avenue	Dayton			
	I-75	Dayton		39.7645°N 84.1996°W	
	SR 48 (Main Street)	Dayton		39.7649°N 84.1933°W	
	Riverside Drive / Patterson Boulevard	Dayton			
	I-75	Dayton		39.7719°N 84.1898°W	
	Helena Street	Dayton			
	Gayle B. Price Jr. Suspension Bridge	Dayton			
	Keowee Street	Dayton			
	I-75	Dayton		39.7916°N 84.1855°W	
	CSX Transportation Toledo Subdivision	Dayton			
	Needmore Road	Dayton/Harrison Township			
	Rip Rap Road Great Miami River Recreational Trail	Dayton			
	Little York Road	Huber Heights			
	I-70 (Dwight D. Eisenhower Highway)	Vandalia–Huber Heights		39.8666°N 84.1672°W	
	US 40	Vandalia–Huber Heights		39.8742°N 84.1620°W	
	Taylorsville Dam	Vandalia–Huber Heights			
Montgomery County–Miami County
	Old Springfield Road / CR 179 (Ross Road)	Vandalia–Bethel Township			
Miami County
	SR 571 (Main Street)	Monroe Township–Bethel Township		39.9575°N 84.1409°W	
	CR 166 (Parkwood Drive / Tipp-Elizabeth Road)	Tipp City (Monroe Township–Bethel Township)			
	Great Miami River Recreational Trail	Concord Township–Staunton Township			
	SR 41	Troy (Concord Township)		40.0305°N 84.1872°W	
	CSX Transportation Toledo Subdivision	Troy (Concord Township)			
	SR 55 (Market Street)	Troy (Concord Township)		40.0414°N 84.2019°W	
	Adams Street	Troy (Concord Township)			
	Eldean Covered Bridge	Concord Township–Staunton Township		40.0778°N 84.2165°W	
	CR 33 (Eldean Road)	Concord Township–Staunton Township			
	I-75	Washington Township–Staunton Township		40.1036°N 84.2266°W	
	Great Miami River Recreational Trail	Washington Township–Staunton Township			
	CR 31 (Peterson Road)	Washington Township–Staunton Township			
	Great Miami River Recreational Trail	Piqua (Washington Township–Springcreek Township)			
	Garnsey Street	Piqua (Washington Township–Springcreek Township)			
	CR 25-A (Main Street)	Piqua (Washington Township–Springcreek Township)			
	Ohio to Indiana Trail	Piqua (Washington Township–Springcreek Township)			
	US 36 (Ash Street)	Piqua (Washington Township–Springcreek Township)		40.1505°N 84.2279°W	
	CR 25-A (Main Street)	Piqua (Washington Township–Springcreek Township)			
	CR 199 (Piqua Lockington Road)	Washington Township–Springcreek Township			
Shelby County
	CR 132 (Lockington Kirkwood Road)	Washington Township–Orange Township			near Lockington; formerly site Lockington Covered Bridge
	CR 49 (Kuther Road)	Washington Township–Orange Township			
	I-75	Washington Township–Orange Township		40.2294°N 84.1976°W	
	CR 135 (Vandemark Road)	Washington Township–Orange Township			
	CSX Transportation Toledo Subdivision	Sidney (Clinton Township)–Orange Township			
	CR 197 (Sulphur Heights Hill)	Sidney (Clinton Township)–Orange Township			
	CR 25-A (Main Avenue)	Sidney (Clinton Township)–Orange Township			
	Gearhart Road	Sidney (Clinton Township)			
	Gearhart Road (abandoned)	Sidney (Clinton Township)			
	Big Four Bridge (CSX Transportation Indianapolis Line Subdivision)	Sidney (Clinton Township)			
	SR 29 (Court Street)	Sidney (Clinton Township)		40.2842°N 84.1497°W	
	SR 47 (North Street)	Sidney (Clinton Township)		40.2869°N 84.1498°W	
	Stolle Bridge	Sidney (Clinton Township)			
	SR 47 (Riverside Drive)	Sidney (Clinton Township)		40.3073°N 84.1375°W	
	CR 16 (Pasco-Montra Road)	Port Jefferson (Salem Township–Perry Township)			
	CR 32 (Johnston-Slagle Road)	Port Jefferson (Salem Township–Perry Township)			
	CR 35 (Baker Road)	Salem Township–Perry Township			
	CR 19 (Tawawa-Maplewood Road)	Salem Township–Perry Township			
	CR 4 (Logan-Shelby Road)	Salem Township–Perry Township			
Logan County
	Indiana and Ohio Railway	Miami Township			
	SR 235 (Carlisle Street)	Quincy (Miami Township)		40.3030°N 83.9696°W	
	SR 235 (Miami Street)	De Graff (Miami Township)		40.3128°N 83.9273°W	
	SR 47	Pleasant Township		40.3434°N 83.9347°W	near Logansville
	CR 21	Pleasant Township			near Logansville
	CR 58	Bloomfield Township–Washington Township			
	McColly Covered Bridge CR 13	Bloomfield Township–Washington Township		40.4011°N 83.9242°W	
	CR 54	Bloomfield Township–Washington Township			
	SR 274	Bloomfield Township–Washington Township		40.4393°N 83.9107°W	
	SR 235	Washington Township		40.4513°N 83.9071°W	
	SR 708 (Orchard Island Drive)	Russells Point (Washington Township)		40.4572°N 83.8982°W	
	US 33	Russells Point (Washington Township)		40.4652°N 83.8789°W	
	SR 366	Washington Township		40.4674°N 83.8754°W	
	Indian Lake Spillway	Washington Township		40.4675°N 83.8755°W	
