= Overpeck Cutoff =

Rail line in Ohio

- Top pin showing location of Overpeck Junction, and directly headed south of this is the cutoff to HM JCT. bottom pin.

Overview
- Status: Operating
- Owner: CSX Transportation
- Locale: Butler County, Ohio
- Termini: Overpeck, Ohio; Woodsdale, Ohio

Service
- Type: Freight rail
- System: CSX Transportation
- Operator(s): CSX Transportation

Technical
- Track gauge: 1,435 mm (4 ft 8 1/2 in) standard gauge

The Overpeck Cutoff is a railroad line is currently owned by CSX Transportation in the U.S. State of Ohio. The line runs from Overpeck Junction in Overpeck, Ohio to HM Junction in Woodsdale, Ohio. This forms a wye diverging off the Toledo Subdivision in Overpeck, Ohio at Overpeck Junction and meeting the Middletown Subdivision at HM Junction.

== History ==
=== Initial sections ===
The Former B&O branch from New Miami, Ohio to Middletown, Ohio was built for the express purpose of serving the massive steel mill belonging to the American Rolling Mills (ARMCO), now owned by AK Steel. CSX Transportation still uses this line daily as its Middletown Subdivision of the Louisville Division.

=== Consolidation ===
The B&O itself merged with the C&O in 1987, which itself became part of CSX Transportation in that year.
