= Butler County Regional Transit Authority =

Provider of mass transportation in Butler County, Ohio

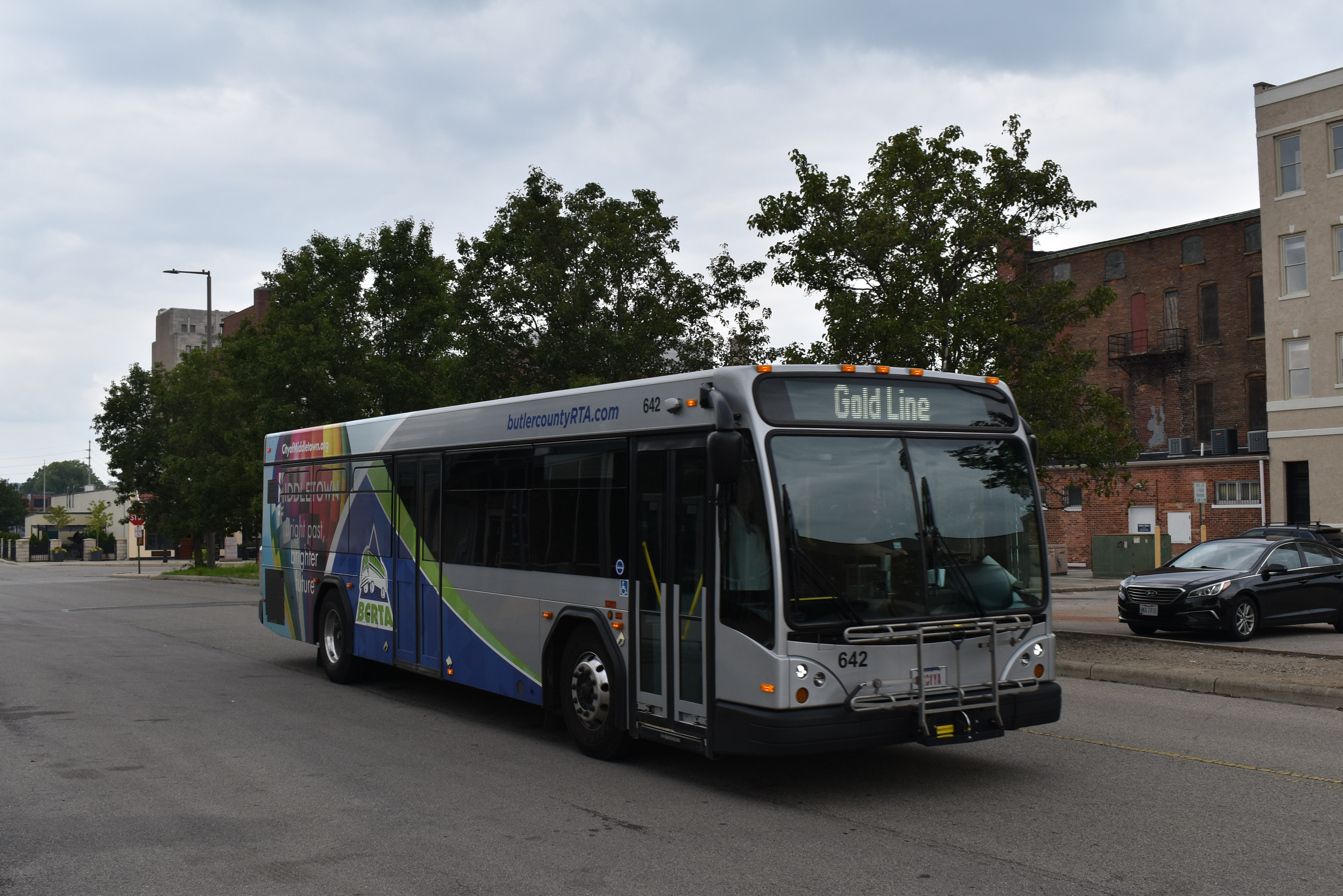
- A Butler County RTA bus at the Middletown Transit Station in 2023
- Founded: 1994
- Headquarters: 3045 Moser Court, Hamilton, OH
- Locale: Hamilton, Middletown and Oxford
- Service area: Butler County, Ohio
- Service type: Bus service, paratransit
- Routes: 12
- Stations: Middletown Transit Station
- Annual ridership: 417,782 (2022)
- Website: Butler County RTA

Butler County Regional Transit Authority, also stylized as BCRTA, is the primary provider of mass transportation in Butler County, Ohio with twelve routes serving the region. As of 2019, the system provided 620,233 rides over 70,789 annual vehicle revenue hours with 18 buses and 17 paratransit vehicles.

== History ==
Public transit in Hamilton began with horsecars in 1875, with Middletown beginning horsecar service in 1879. Horsecars in both cities were replaced with electric streetcars in the 1880s and 1890s, which in turn were replaced by buses in 1918 in Middletown and in 1932 in Hamilton.

The BCRTA will be fare-free through 2024. Service from Middletown to West Chester and Cincinnati has been proposed numerous times in recent years. The service would utilize commuter buses and provide express service to downtown Cincinnati. Previously commuter buses connected Middletown, Monroe and Dayton, where riders could transfer to the Dayton RTA.

== Service ==
Butler County RTA operates 12 regular weekday bus routes centered on Middletown and Oxford. Four routes operate in Middletown, five in Oxford, with three regional services connecting Hamilton, Middletown and Oxford. The R6 Job Connector provides connections to SORTA in Springdale.

Hours of operation for the system are Monday through Friday from 6:00 A.M. to 11:00 P.M. Service in Middletown is provided from 8:30 A.M. to 4:30 P.M. on Saturdays. There is no service on Sundays. Fixed route services are fare-free.

=== Routes ===
==== Regional ====
- R1 Hamilton/Middletown Shuttle
- R3 Forest Park/Oxford Connector
- R6 Job Connector

==== Oxford local ====
- O1 Farmer
- O1D Ditmer
- O2 Western
- O3 Walmart
- O4 Millet

==== Middletown local ====
- Blue Line
- Green Line
- Gold Line
- Red Line

==== Express Routes ====
- CincyLink Express
- CincyLink Clifton

== Fleet ==
Butler county RTA's fleet consist of a variety of vehicles that are used for Fixed route (FR), and demand response (DR) services.

Cutaways
Year	Fleet	Model	Service	Garage	Notes
2016	1601-1606	Ford	1601 FR equipped.	Hamilton	1601 active. All others retired
2017	1701-1705 749-750	Ford	749 FR equipped.	Hamilton & Middletown.	1701-1705 Ex Dayton RTA. 749 and 750 purchased by Middletown.
2018	1895-1899	Ford	1895 FR equipped.	Hamilton.	1896, 1897, 1899 retired.
2020	2080-2091	Ford	2080-2082, 2084, 2088, and 2091 FR equipped.	Hamilton & Oxford.	2091 is CDL. 2086 retired.
2022	2280	Ford	Demand Response	Hamilton.	2280 is not equipped with a headsign.
2024	2501-2507	Ford	2501, 2503, 2505 & 2507 FR equipped.	Hamilton.	In service as of June.
2025	2401-2403	Dodge	All are FR equipped.	Hamilton & Oxford.	Front Runners equipped with 14 seats.
2026	26??	Ford	Unknown	Unknown	5 propane vehicles not yet in service.

Gillig & MCI's.
Year	Fleet	Model	Service	Garage	Notes
2015	1501-1512 1520-1521	Gillig & Ford	FR only	Oxford & Hamilton.	1520-1521 are Ford F-550's. (referred to as bullets).
2016	640-644 1607-1609	Gillig	FR only	Middletown, Oxford And Hamilton.	640-644 purchased by Middletown.
2019	1901-1904	Gillig	FR only	Oxford	Trolley body's.
2021	645	Gillig	FR only	Middletown	Purchased by Middletown.
2022	2201-2205 2301-2303	MCI's	Cincylink only.	Hamilton	Funded by Middletown, Powered by BCRTA.

Other active vehicles include vans, which are listed as 1513-1517 (2015's), 1995-1997, & 1999 (2019's). All vans are used for demand response services.

== Fixed route ridership ==
The ridership statistics shown here are for fixed route services only and do not include demand response services.

== See also ==
- List of bus transit systems in the United States
- SORTA
- Hamilton station
- Oxford station
