= Connersville station =

Amtrak train station in Indiana, US

Connersville, IN
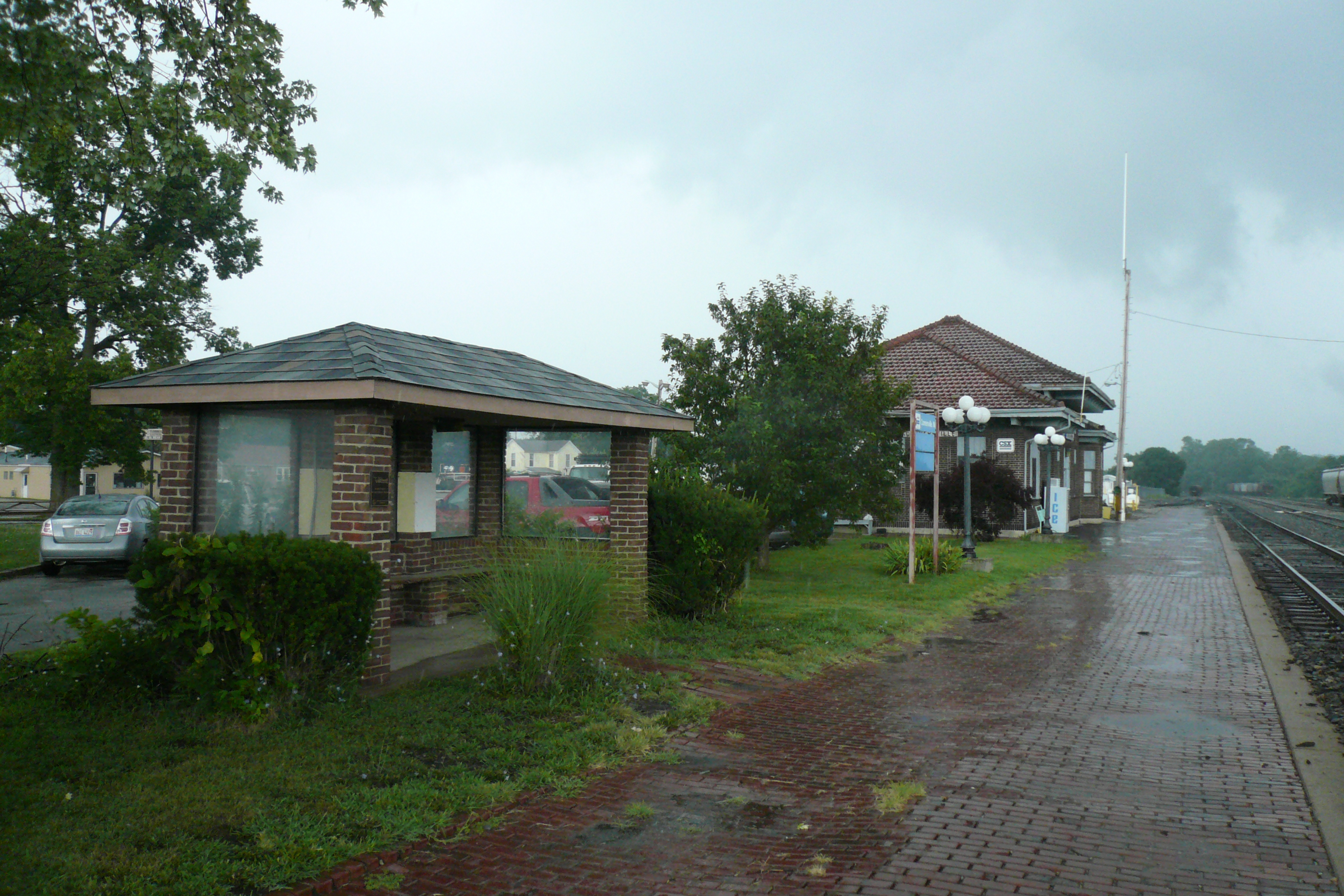
- The Amtrak shelter station (foreground) at the station

General information
- Location: 1012 North Eastern Avenue; Connersville, Indiana; United States
- Coordinates: 39.6460°N 85.1332°W
- Line: CSX Indianapolis Subdivision
- Platforms: 1 side platform
- Tracks: 2

Other information
- Station code: Amtrak: COI

History
- Opened: 1914; October 29, 1990 (Amtrak)

Passengers
- FY 2025: 726 (Amtrak)

Services
Preceding station	Amtrak	Following station
Indianapolis toward Chicago	Cardinal	Cincinnati toward New York
Former services
Preceding station	Baltimore and Ohio Railroad	Following station
Glenwood toward Springfield	Springfield – Hamilton	Lyonsville toward Hamilton
Preceding station	Amtrak	Following station
Indianapolis toward Chicago	Cardinal	Hamilton Until 2005 toward New York
Proposed services
Preceding station	Amtrak	Following station
Indianapolis toward Chicago	Cardinal	Oxford toward New York
Location

Connersville station is an Amtrak station in Connersville, Indiana, served by the Cardinal. The original station was built in 1914 by the Cincinnati, Hamilton & Dayton Railroad and is adjacent to the currently-used shelter station.

Amtrak train 51, the westbound Cardinal, is scheduled to depart Connersville at 3:36 a.m. on Monday, Thursday and Saturday with a service to Indianapolis, Crawfordsville, Lafayette, Rensselaer, Dyer and Chicago Union Station.

Amtrak train 50, the eastbound Cardinal, is scheduled to depart Connersville at 1:31 a.m. on Wednesday, Friday and Sunday with a service to Cincinnati, Maysville, South Portsmouth, Ashland, Huntington, Charleston, Montgomery, Thurmond, Prince, Hinton, Alderson, White Sulphur Springs, Clifton Forge, Staunton, Charlottesville, Culpeper, Manassas, Alexandria, Washington Union Station, and continuing to New York City.
