= Hamilton station (Ohio) =

Historic railroad station in Hamilton, Ohio

Hamilton, OH
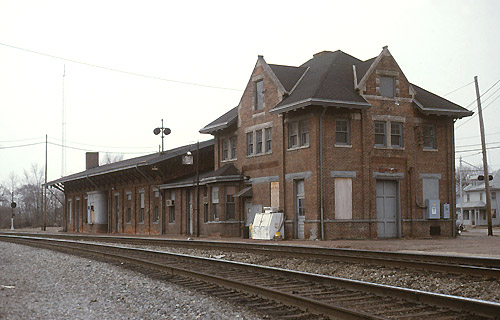
- Hamilton station in March 1993

General information
- Location: 432 South Martin Luther King Jr. Boulevard; Hamilton, Ohio; United States
- Coordinates: 39.3943°N 84.5591°W
- Owner: CSX Transportation
- Lines: CSX Indianapolis Subdivision, Toledo Subdivision, and Cincinnati Terminal Subdivision
- Platforms: 1 side platform
- Tracks: 3

Other information
- Status: Standing
- Station code: HMN

History
- Opened: August 1980
- Closed: October 31, 2005 (Amtrak service)

Former passenger services
Preceding station	Amtrak	Following station
Connersville toward Chicago	Cardinal	Cincinnati toward New York
Richmond until 1986 toward Chicago	Cardinal	Cincinnati (River Road) until 1991 toward New York
Preceding station	Baltimore and Ohio Railroad	Following station
Oxford toward Springfield	Springfield – Hamilton	Terminus
Winton Place toward Cincinnati	Toledo Division	Middletown toward Detroit
Location

Hamilton station is a former railroad station in Hamilton, Ohio. Originally constructed by the Cincinnati, Hamilton and Dayton Railroad, which was later acquired by the Baltimore and Ohio Railroad (B&O), it was served by the B&O until 1971. Hamilton was then served by the Amtrak Cardinal from 1980 to 2005.

== History ==
Hamilton station was originally constructed by the Cincinnati, Hamilton and Dayton Railroad, which was acquired by the Baltimore and Ohio Railroad in 1917. It was served by trains on the Cincinnati–Detroit Toledo Division, including Cincinnatian and the Night Express, as well as the Cincinnati–Indianapolis line. The Cincinnatian was the final train to serve Hamilton; it was discontinued on May 1, 1971, when Amtrak took over intercity passenger service.

The station was a stop for Amtrak's Cardinal from August 3, 1980, until October 31, 2005. It was not a heavily patronized stop in later years, and only had a waiting room. Ticketing and baggage service were not available at this location. Poor station conditions, low ridership, and inconvenient arrival/departure times caused Amtrak to convert Hamilton to a flag stop in November 2004 and discontinue the stop altogether a year later.

In 2020, the city of Hamilton was trying to develop a plan to prevent a planned demolition of the station by its owner CSX as part of a track modernization plan. The city is considering purchasing the building and moving it several blocks to Third Street and Sycamore Street. After restoration, they hope to utilize the building as a transportation hub, museum, restaurant, or a farmers' market. In early 2023, the station was successfully relocated from its original location to a new spot nearby. The city of Hamilton plans to restore the building for eventual development in the future.

In 2021, City officials called for Hamilton to be added as a stop for proposed Cincinnati–Chicago passenger trains. By 2022, the city was studying the feasibility of building a new stop for the Cardinal northwest of the old station on the CSX tracks in Symmes Park. The buildings were listed on the National Register of Historic Places in July 2024.
