= Middletown Subdivision =

Railway line in Ohio

- Map

Overview
- Status: Active
- Owner: CSX Transportation
- Locale: Cincinnati Metro
- Termini: Middletown Junction; Oakland

Service
- Type: Freight rail
- System: CSX Transportation
- Operator(s): CSX Transportation

Technical
- Number of tracks: 1
- Track gauge: 4 ft 8 1/2 in (1,435 mm) standard gauge

The Middletown Subdivision is a railroad line owned by CSX Transportation in the U.S. State of Ohio. The line runs from New Miami, Ohio to Middletown, Ohio, for a total of 11.2 miles (18.0 km). At its south end, it branches off of the Toledo Subdivision at Middletown Junction and at its north end, the line branches off through Lind Yard then enters AK Steel Middletown Works, after crossing the Norfolk Southern Dayton District on the High Line or on a diamond, the line continues north with the track ending at Cohen Recycling.

== M7-Middletown Subdivision information ==
| Info | Notes |
|---|---|
| Operators on | 160.2300 MHz |
| Controlled by the LA dispatcher | 160.2900 MHz |
| Location | Between New Miami, Ohio, and Middletown, Ohio, (11.2 miles) |
| Subdivision | Single Track |
| Defect Detectors | None |

== History ==
=== Initial sections ===
The Former B&O branch from New Miami, Ohio, to Middletown, Ohio, was built for the express purpose of serving the massive steel mill belonging to the ARMCO Steel (now known as AK Steel. CSX Transportation still uses this line daily as its Middletown Subdivision of the Louisville Division.

=== Consolidation ===
The B&O itself merged with the C&O in 1987, which itself became part of CSX Transportation in that year.

== Milepost ==
| Mile Post (Northbound) | Station Name | Notes |
|---|---|---|
| 2.5 | Middletown JCT. | Jct.CSX Transportation Toledo Subdivision |
| 4.0 | HM Junction | Jct.Overpeck Cutoff |
| 5.7 | Woodsdale, Ohio | |
| 6.9 | Rockdale, Ohio | |
| 8.3 | LeSourdsville, Ohio | Former Americana Amusement Park and Fantasy Farm sites. |
| 8.6 | Southeast Park | siding |
| 9.4 | Park | 8000 ft. siding |
| 10.0 | Northeast Park | siding |
| 10.6 | SouthExcello, Ohio | |
| 11.5 | North Excello, Ohio | Lind Yard & connection with CSX Transportation High Line to AK Steel Middletown Works |
| 12.0 | Armco Junction | Crosses Norfolk Southern Dayton District & enters AK Steel Middletown Works Jct. AK Steel Railroad |
| 13.7 | Cohen Recycling | End of Track |

== See also ==
- List of CSX Transportation lines
- AK Steel
