= Oxford station (Ohio) =

Oxford, OH

General information
- Location: 101 Chestnut Street; Oxford, Ohio
- Coordinates: 39.4997°N 84.7423°W
- Line: CSXT Indianapolis Subdivision
- Platforms: 1 side platform
- Tracks: 1

Construction
- Accessible: Yes

History
- Opening: 2027

Future services
Preceding station	Amtrak	Following station
Connersville toward Chicago	Cardinal	Cincinnati toward New York
Location

Oxford station is a planned Amtrak station in Oxford, Ohio that will be served by the Cardinal. It is expected to open in 2027.

== History ==
Oxford was previously served by the Baltimore and Ohio Railroad at a now-demolished station.

A new stop was first proposed in 2009, but an Amtrak study for such a stop determined that ridership would not be high enough to justify a stop in Oxford. However, in 2014, it was noted that nearby Miami University had a student population of around 16,000, prompting Amtrak to look again at adding an Oxford stop. In the winter of 2016–2017, it was announced that $700,000 funding for the station has been provided by the City of Oxford and Miami University, each contributing $350,000.

Amtrak is ready to move forward with adding the stop once it is constructed. The platform will be a Category 4 platform, an unstaffed kiosk. As of March 2021, negotiations with the contractors are continuing. The platform is to be built near the intersection of Main and Chestnut Streets in Oxford.

On November 4, 2022, it was announced that $2 million in funding through the Ohio-Kentucky-Indiana Regional Council of Governments had been awarded for the project. The platform would be part of a new multimodal station in Oxford, and was slated to start construction in 2026. As of January 2026, the station is planned to open in 2027.
