= Hamilton Belt Line =

Former railroad line in Ohio

- Map

Overview
- Status: Rail trail
- Locale: Westside of Hamilton, Ohio

Service
- Type: Freight rail
- System: CSX Transportation
- Operator(s): CSXT & U.S. Rail Corporation switching only

Technical
- Line length: 2.9 mi (4.7 km)
- Track gauge: 1,435 mm (4 ft 8 1/2 in) standard gauge

The Belt Line was a former CSX owned freight railroad branch industrial line on the west side of Hamilton, Ohio extending from Belt Junction JCT connection with CSX Cincinnati Terminal Subdivision and the CSX Indianapolis Subdivision. After the rail line closed, it was converted into a bicycling and hiking path.

== History ==
The 2.9-mile Hamilton Belt Railway operated entirely within Hamilton from 1898 until 2012, serving several industries on the city’s West Side. Its prime customer for 114 years was Champion Papers (later SMART Papers). By 1926, Champion was dispatching 18 to 20 cars of paper daily, and bringing in an average of 144 box cars and 55 coal cars each week. In 1926, HBR tracks were purchased by the B&O. By 1940, Champion’s Hamilton mill rail yards had more than 20 miles of track with several steam locomotives shuttling cars around the clock. HBR began losing business to trucks after World War II. It had no locomotives or cars and was worked in succession by the CH&D, the B&O, CSX and, after 1988, by privately owned short line companies Great Miami & Western Railway then U.S. Rail Corporation.

== Milepost ==
Mile Post (Northbound)	Station Name	Notes
Begin of CSX Transportation Indianapolis Subdivision/End of CSX Transportation Cincinnati Terminal Subdivision - Hamilton Depot to Belt Junction
Begin of CSX Transportation Cincinnati Terminal Subdivision - Belt Junction JCT. to Hamilton Depot/End of CSX Transportation Indianapolis Subdivision - Hamilton Depot to Belt Junction
0.0	Belt Junction	Jct. CSX Transportation Cincinnati Terminal Subdivision - Belt Junction to Hamilton Depot/End of CSX Transportation Indianapolis Subdivision - Hamilton Depot to Belt Junction
0.4	Butler County Lumber Company	
0.5	American Frog & Switch	
2.0	Woods Yard	
2.5	Champion Paper Mill Hamilton	
2.9	Champion Paper Mill Hamilton	End of Track
