= Overpeck, Ohio =

Overpeck
- Unincorporated community
- Nicknames: Overpeck Station, Overpecks, Overpecks Station, Overpeck Park
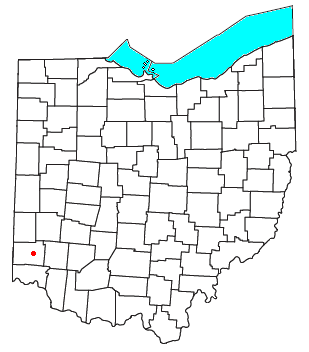
- Location of Overpeck, Ohio
- Coordinates: 39°27′03″N 84°30′53″W
- Country: United States
- State: Ohio
- Counties: Butler
- Elevation: 633 ft (193 m)
- Time zone: UTC-5 (Eastern (EST))
  - Summer (DST): UTC-4 (EDT)
- ZIP code: 45055
- Area code: 513
- FIPS code: 39017
- GNIS feature ID: 1065226

Overpeck (other names: Overpeck Station, Overpecks, Overpecks Station) is an unincorporated community in central St. Clair Township, Butler County, Ohio, United States. It has a post office with the ZIP code 45055. It lies between New Miami and Trenton.

Overpeck is a part of the Cincinnati-Middletown-Wilmington, OH-KY-IN Combined Statistical Area.

A post office called Overpecks Station was established in 1860, and the name was changed to Overpeck in 1882. The community has the name of Isaac Overpeck, an early resident.

== Notable person ==
- Charles Francis Richter, seismologist and eponym of Richter scale
