= Oxford station (Baltimore and Ohio Railroad) =

- Oxford Railroad Depot and Junction House
- U.S. National Register of Historic Places
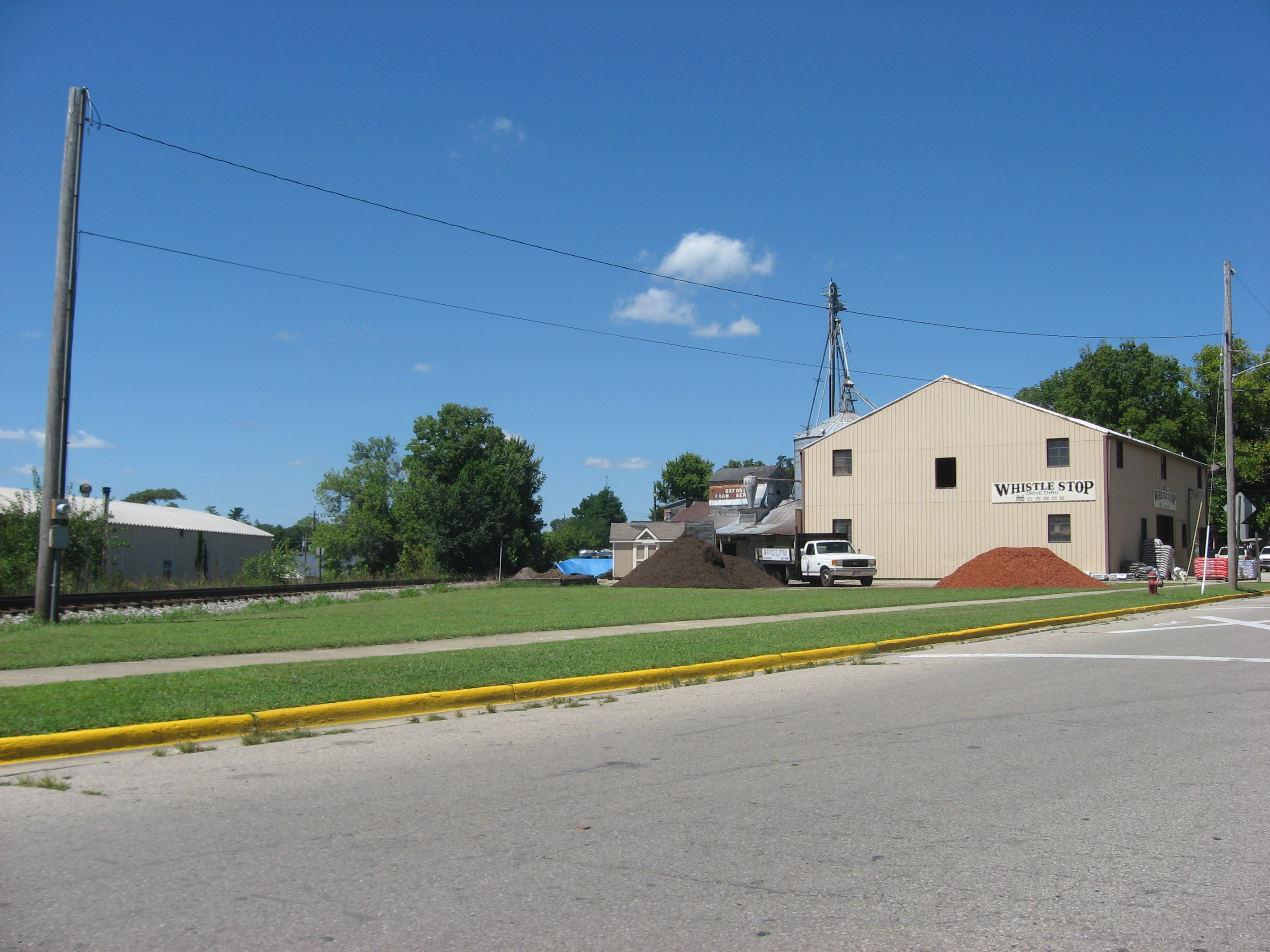
- Site of the depot

- Location within Ohio Location within the United States
- Location: S. Elm and W. Spring St., Oxford, Ohio
- Coordinates: 39°30′27″N 84°44′51″W
- Area: less than one acre
- Built: 1860, 1895
- Architect: Isaac and Joseph White
- NRHP reference No.: 80002949
- Added to NRHP: February 8, 1980

Oxford station was a historic train station at South Elm and West Spring Streets in Oxford, Ohio. Oxford first received railroad service in the 1850s, when a line connecting the Chicago and Cincinnati rail networks was completed through the city. The original station was replaced by a larger building in 1895. Before the rise of the automobile, the station's passenger services brought students to and from Oxford's multiple colleges, including Miami University, and its freight services shipped local agricultural products to their markets. A building known as the Junction House, located across the street from the depot, was built in 1860 and is closely associated with the railroad. Originally a grocery store, it became a hotel and tavern in 1868; while a local temperance movement closed the tavern in the 1870s, it remained a hotel until 1905 and is now an apartment building.

The station was listed in the National Register of Historic Places on February 8, 1980, as the Oxford Railroad Depot and Junction House. The depot has been demolished but the Junction House remains across the street from the vacant lot where the depot once stood.

== Notes ==
Preceding station	Baltimore and Ohio Railroad	Following station
College Corner toward Springfield	Springfield – Hamilton	Hamilton Terminus
