= Francis T. Bacon =

American architect

Francis T. Bacon was the supervising architect of the Illinois Central Railroad system from the mid-1890s to 1907. Bacon died in Chicago on June 18, 1909, at the age of 43, after having been in private practice for two years.

== Works ==
- Union Station, Madison Street, Springfield, Illinois, 1896, NRHP-listed
- Illinois Central Railroad Main Station, Champaign, Illinois, 1898
- Illinois Central Office Building, Carbondale, Illinois, 1899
- Illinois Central Railroad Station, Decatur, Illinois, 1899
- Fort Dodge & Omaha (Illinois Central) Station, Council Bluffs, Iowa, 1900
- Fort Dodge & Omaha (Illinois Central) Station, Denison, Iowa, 1900
- Illinois Central Railroad Passenger Depot, 111 South Illinois Avenue, Carbondale, Illinois, 1903, NRHP-listed
- Illinois Central Railroad Van Buren Street Station, Chicago, Illinois
- Illinois Central 12th Street Station Annex, Chicago, Illinois
- Union Station, Memphis, Tennessee
- Illinois Central warehouses, New Orleans, Louisiana

== Gallery ==
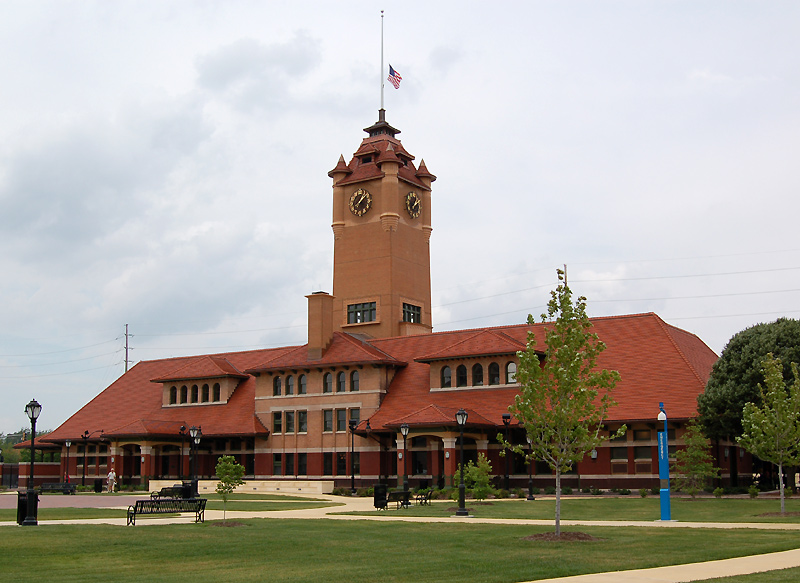
Union Station, Springfield, Illinois

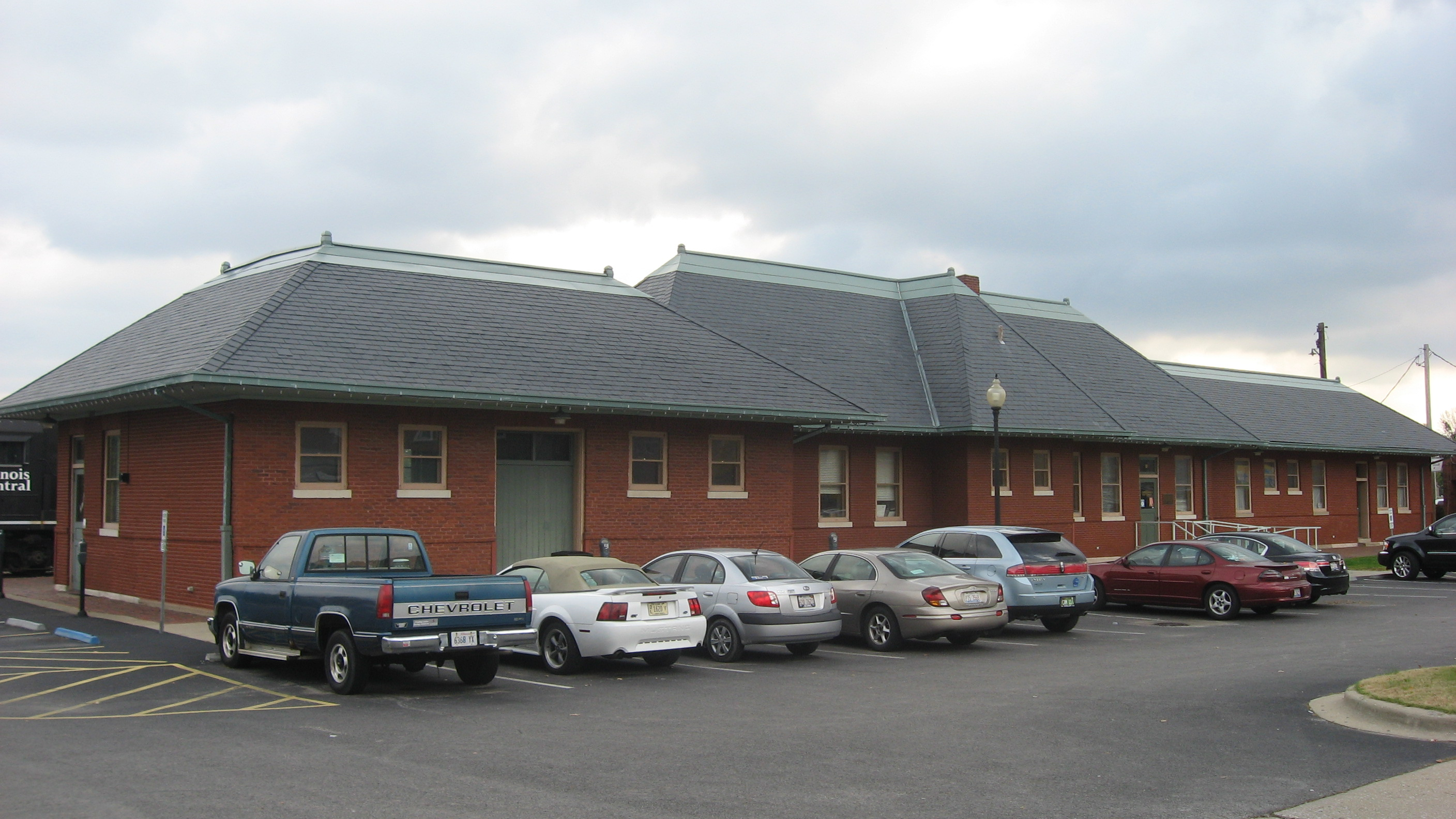
Illinois Central Passenger Depot, Carbondale, Illinois
