= Fantasy Farm =

Fantasy Farm currently serves as an event venue located in the heart of the Don Valley in Toronto, Ontario, Canada. The property is enclosed by a dense thickening of forest belonging to over 200 acres of conservation land, and the grounds of the venue itself is composed of well-maintained gardens and fountains, two large banquet halls seating up to 250 people, a stone terrace, a back pavilion, a koi pond, and a waterfall.

== History ==
The history of the property extends back over 200 years to the 1790s, when land on the Don River was granted to Isaiah and Aaron Skinner by Lieutenant-Governor John Graves Simcoe with the intention of building a mill to provide lumber to what was known as the settlement of York in Upper Canada.

A decade and a half later, the Helliwell family, who had emigrated from Todmorden, England, a town between the counties of Lancashire and Yorkshire, settled down in the Don area and renamed it Todmorden in memory of their hometown. The community of Todmorden soon became a bustling and significant industrial centre, with influential and ambitious families such as the Skinners, the Helliwells, the Eastwoods, and the Taylors who over the generations had successfully built and ran a series of mills (including a paper mill, a tin mill, a flour mill, a gristmill, and a sharpening mill), a brewery, a malthouse, a distillery, and the Don Valley Brick Works.

The property of Fantasy Farm was originally known as the Skinner home, later acquired by the Taylors. However, in 1901, most of the Taylor holdings had been attained by Robert Davies, including the location of Fantasy Farm itself. The property was left somewhat neglected, and it was not until almost half a century later, in 1944, when Rand Freeland, a successful entrepreneur from Toronto who knew an opportunity when he saw one and purchased the run-down property on Pottery Road for only $500. Freeland was an equestrian aficionado and hoped to nurse his injured horse Silky back to health on the property, seeing its natural cushioning of lush forests as a healthy environment away from the city for his adored horse to recover. Silky’s health improved, and Freeland subsequently turned his focus onto promoting what he officially named Fantasy Farm as a new location for weddings, banquets, and meetings for important clientele from Toronto and beyond. Its well-maintained, horticulturally-inspired grounds coupled with the natural enclosure of the surrounding valley and forests was a welcoming haven away from the urban centre of the metropolitan for Fantasy Farm guests and the location quickly grew in popularity.

Rand Freeland, who valued the giant white pines, bur oaks, and massive elms, the Don river, as well as the diverse wildlife which inhabited the surrounding areas of his new establishment, saw the importance of conservation, as did his good friend Charles Sauriol, who co-founded the Don Valley Conservation Association (DVCA) in 1949. The DVCA, of which Freeland was a passionate member, was dedicated to preserving the Don Valley as a natural forest and its efforts were especially significant after the devastation caused by Hurricane Hazel in October or 1954. Prior to the hurricane, the Todmorden area had been slated for further development by the city, but as the Don and Humber rivers proved to be vital drainage channels after the flooding caused by the hurricane, authorities came to see the value in Toronto’s ravine system. Tormorden mills was soon deemed as one of the number of sites to be kept under preservation by the Metropolitan Toronto and Region Conservation Authority (MTRCA) thanks to its conjoined efforts with the DVCA. Freeland often donated the use of Fantasy Farm’s facilities for the DVCA’s events and celebrations, placing the venue as a monumental beacon in the history of the Don Valley’s preservation.

== Bibliography ==
- Bonnell, Jennifer. "Don River Valley Historical Mapping Project." Map & Data Library — Map and Data Library. University of Toronto Libraries. Web. 28 September 2011. <http://maps.library.utoronto.ca/dvhmp/todmorden.html>.
- "Charles Sauriol: Pioneer Ecologist." Cabbagetown People. Cabbagetown Preservation Association. Web. 28 September 2011. <https://web.archive.org/web/20110826105733/http://www.cabbagetownpeople.ca/Pages/40cSauriol.html>.
- "Residences and Structures in the Valley." Musée Virtuel Du Canada (MVC). Todmorden Mills Heritage and Museum Arts Centre. Web. 28 September 2011. <https://web.archive.org/web/20120405071354/http://www.museevirtuel.ca/pm.php?id=story_line>.
- Sauriol, Charles, and Vivian Webb. Tales of the Don. Toronto, Ont.: Natural Heritage/Natural History, 1984. Print.
- "Todmorden Mills Heritage Site: Background." Toronto.ca. City of Toronto. Web. 28 September 2011. <https://www.toronto.ca/culture/museums/todmorden-history.htm>.
- "Workers' Housing in the Don Valley." Musée Virtuel Du Canada (MVC). Todmorden Mills Heritage Museum and Arts Centre. Web. 28 September 2011. <https://web.archive.org/web/20120405071354/http://www.museevirtuel.ca/pm.php?id=story_line>.
