= Toledo Subdivision =

Railroad line in Ohio, United States

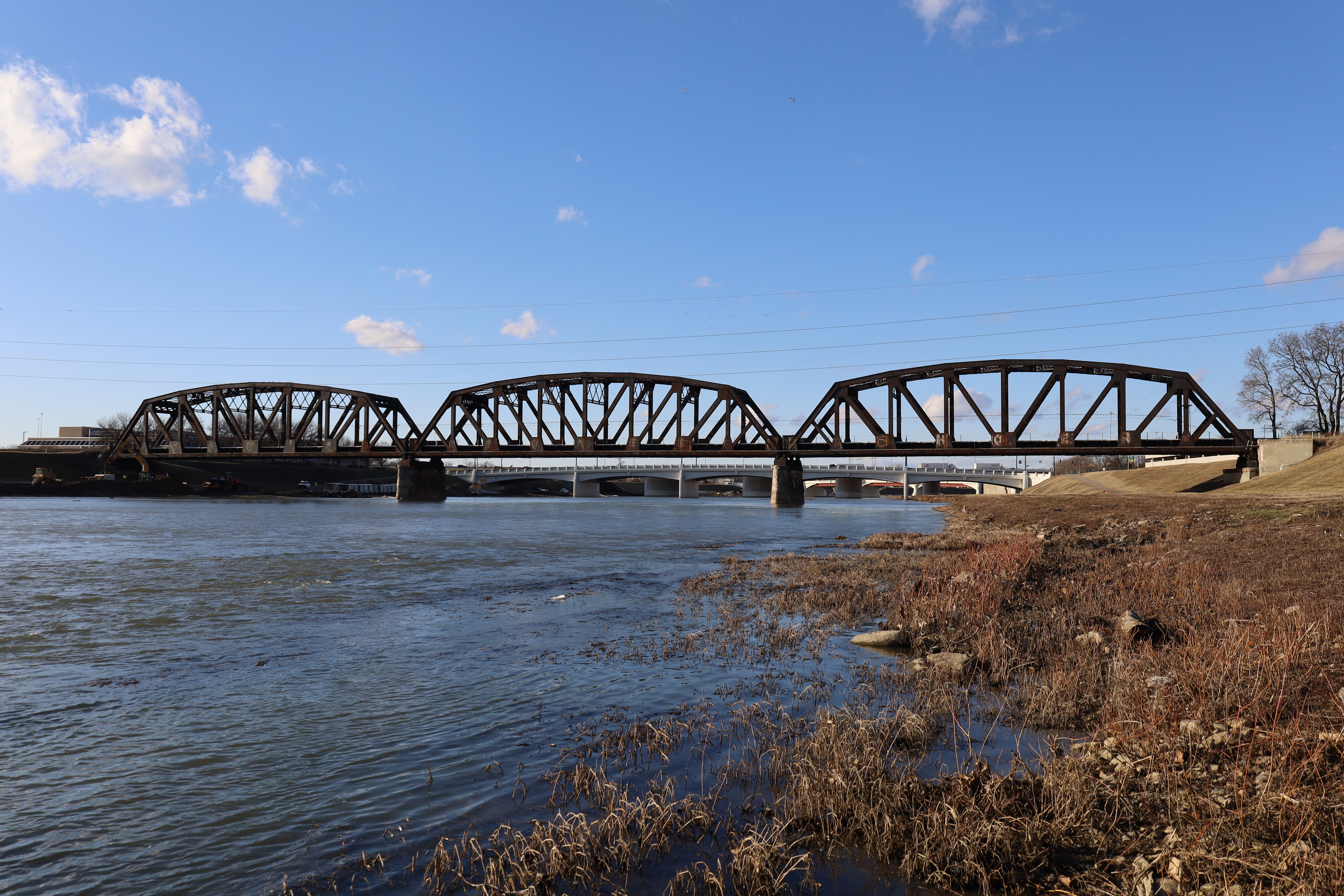
- The Toledo Subdivision crosses the Great Miami River several times; this crossing is in Downtown Dayton, Ohio

Overview
- Status: Operational
- Owner: CSX Transportation
- Locale: Ohio
- Termini: Hamilton, Ohio; Perrysburg, Ohio

Service
- Type: Freight rail
- System: CSX Transportation
- Route number: TO
- Operator(s): CSX Transportation

Technical
- Line length: 167.8 mi (270.0 km)
- Track gauge: 1,435 mm (4 ft 8 1/2 in) standard gauge

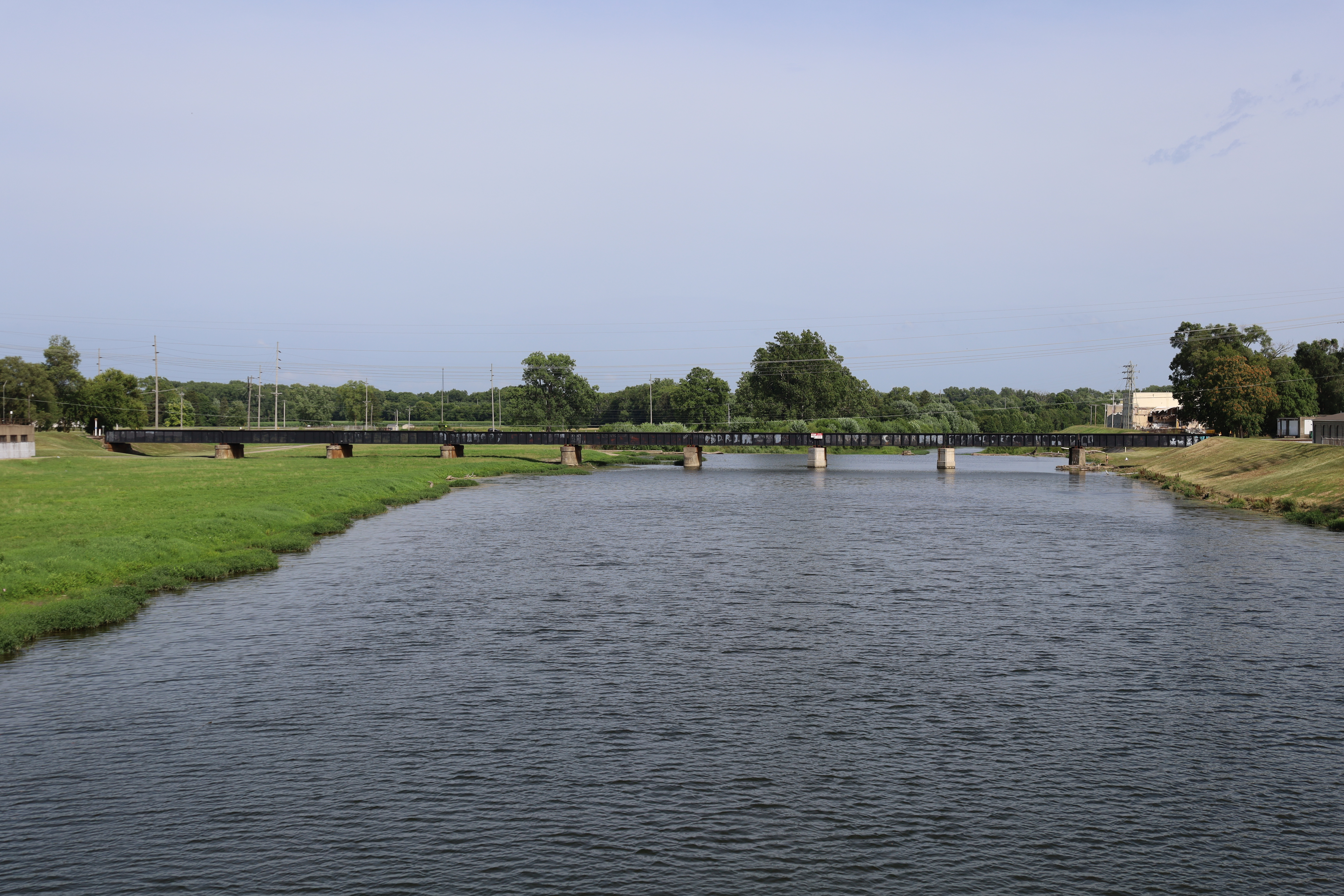
Another crossing of the Great Miami River in Troy, Ohio in 2023

The Toledo Subdivision is a railroad line owned and operated by CSX Transportation in the U.S. state of Ohio. The line runs 167.8 miles (270.0 km) from Hamilton (north of Cincinnati) north to Perrysburg (near Toledo). It was originally built by predecessors of the Baltimore and Ohio Railroad.

The south end of the Toledo Subdivision is at the north end of the Cincinnati Terminal Subdivision, near the east end of the Indianapolis Subdivision. Its north end is at the south end of the Toledo Terminal Subdivision. In between, it junctions with the Middletown Subdivision at New Miami, the Indianapolis Line Subdivision at Sidney, and the Garrett Subdivision at Deshler.

== History ==
South of Dayton, the Toledo Subdivision was opened by the Cincinnati, Hamilton and Dayton Railroad in 1851. Later that decade in 1859, the Dayton and Michigan Railroad opened, continuing the line to Toledo. The lines passed to the Baltimore and Ohio Railroad and CSX through leases and mergers.
