= Miamitown bridge collapse =

Coordinates: 39°12′58″N 84°42′12″W

On May 26, 1989, about 5:25 p.m. Eastern Daylight Time, a 140-foot (43 m) section of the 556-foot (169 m) Harrison Road (U.S. Route 52) temporary bridge over the Great Miami River in Miamitown, Ohio fell about 40 feet (12 m) into the rain-swollen river when a pile bent collapsed due to damage from floating debris.

Several witnesses reported a car and a pickup truck fell into the river, however only the two occupants of the car were recovered, no other vehicles were found and no other persons were ever reported missing.

The National Transportation Safety Board determined that the probable cause of the temporary bridge collapse was the selection by the Hamilton County Engineer's Office of a design by the National Engineering and Contracting Company that did not consider lateral loads and the failure of the Hamilton County Engineer's Office to promptly close the bridge when it became subject to significant debris loading. Contributing to the cause of the collapse was the failure of the Hamilton County Engineer's Office to submit the bridge design plans to the Ohio Department of Transportation for review as required by state law.

The one-lane bridge was intended to carry U.S. 52 traffic while a replacement for the 93-year-old Miamitown Bridge was being built. It was a compromise between the engineer's office and nearby residents and merchants.
