= Cincinnati Terminal Subdivision =

Railroad line in Kentucky and Ohio, US

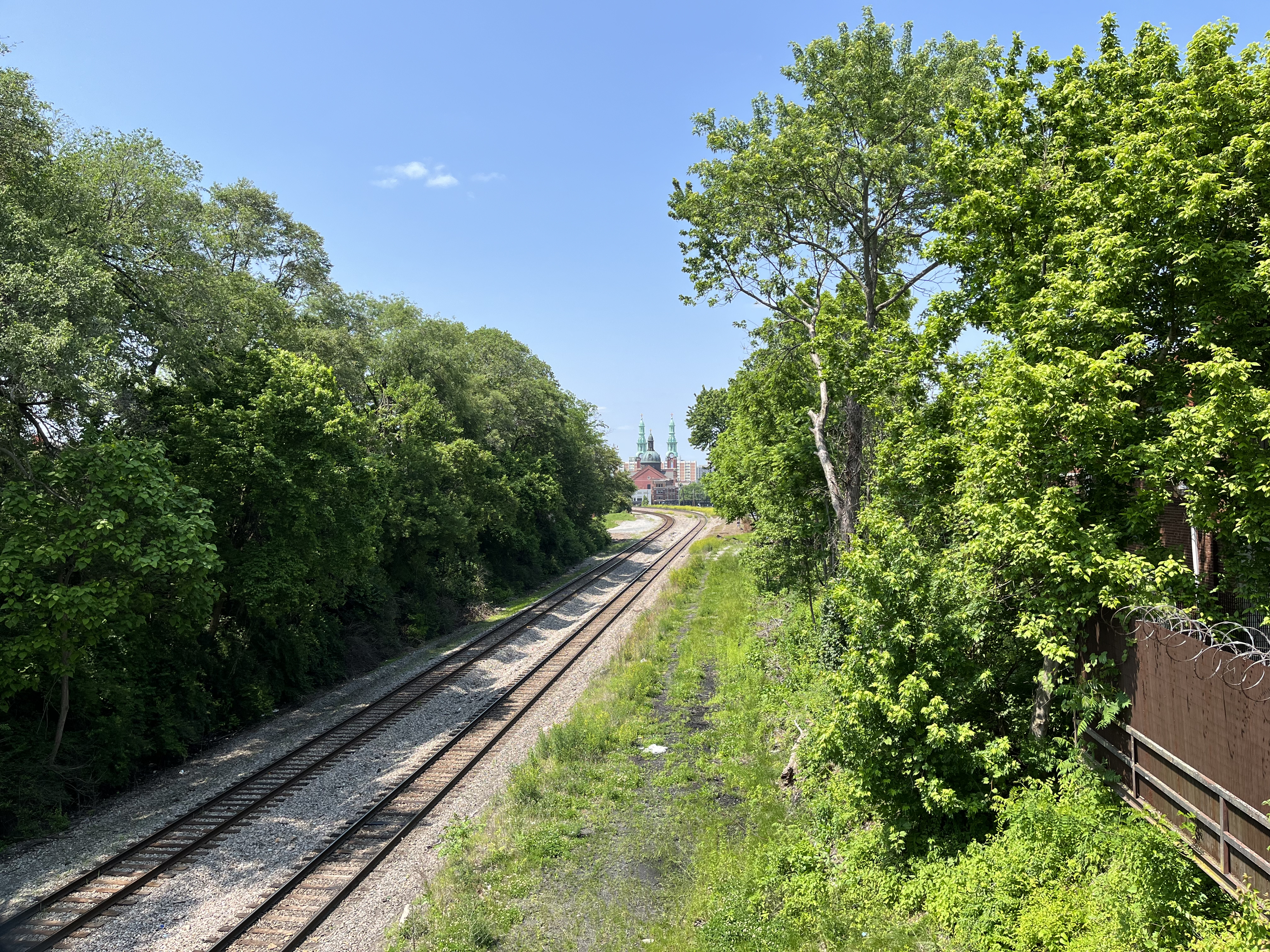
- The rail line in Covington, Kentucky in 2023, looking north with the Mutter Gottes Church in the distance

Overview
- Status: Operational
- Owner: CSX Transportation
- Locale: Butler County, Ohio, Hamilton County, Ohio, Campbell County Kentucky, and Kenton County, Kentucky
- Termini: Hamilton, Ohio (north), Cincinnati, Ohio (west); Silver Lake, Kentucky (south), Melbourne, Kentucky (east)
- Stations: 1
- Website: www.csx.com

Service
- Type: Freight rail, Passenger rail
- System: CSX Transportation
- Operator(s): CSX Transportation, Indiana & Ohio Railway (trackage rights), Norfolk Southern (trackage rights & directional running northbound to Butler Street Interlocker), Amtrak

Technical
- Line length: 58.5 mi (94.1 km)
- Track gauge: 1,435 mm (4 ft 8 1/2 in) standard gauge

The Cincinnati Terminal Subdivision is a railroad line owned by CSX Transportation in the U.S. states of Kentucky and Ohio. The line is part of the CSX Transportation Louisville Division and the Northern Region. There are seven sections to the Cincinnati Terminal Subdivision. The seven sections are as follows:

- Butler St. to Winton Pl. – Hamilton, Ohio to Cincinnati, Ohio (19.1 miles)
- Hamilton to Belt Junction – Hamilton, Ohio (1.5 miles)

(Hamilton Belt Line tracks have been removed).

- NA Tower to CT Junction – Cincinnati, Ohio (6.6 miles)
- RH West to CT Junction – Cincinnati, Ohio (4.8 miles)
- CT Junction to Spring Lake – Cincinnati, Ohio to Covington, Kentucky (9.5 miles)
- NX Cabin to South Latonia – Covington, Kentucky (4.4 miles)
- Melbourne to KC Junction – Melbourne, Kentucky to Covington, Kentucky (12.6 miles)

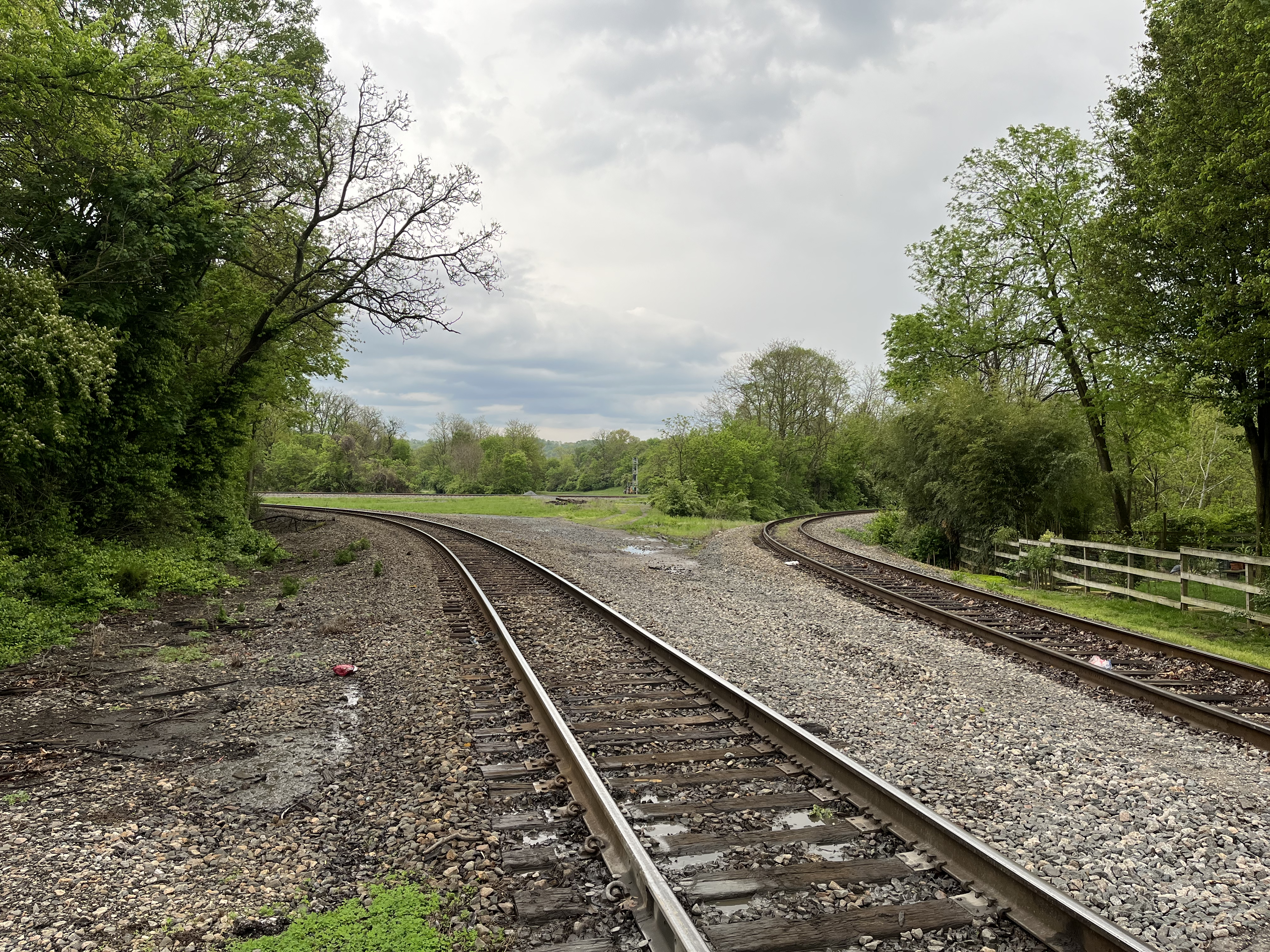
Looking towards Latonia Junction in 2022

== See also ==
- List of CSX Transportation lines
