= Indianapolis Subdivision =

Railway line in Ohio and Indiana

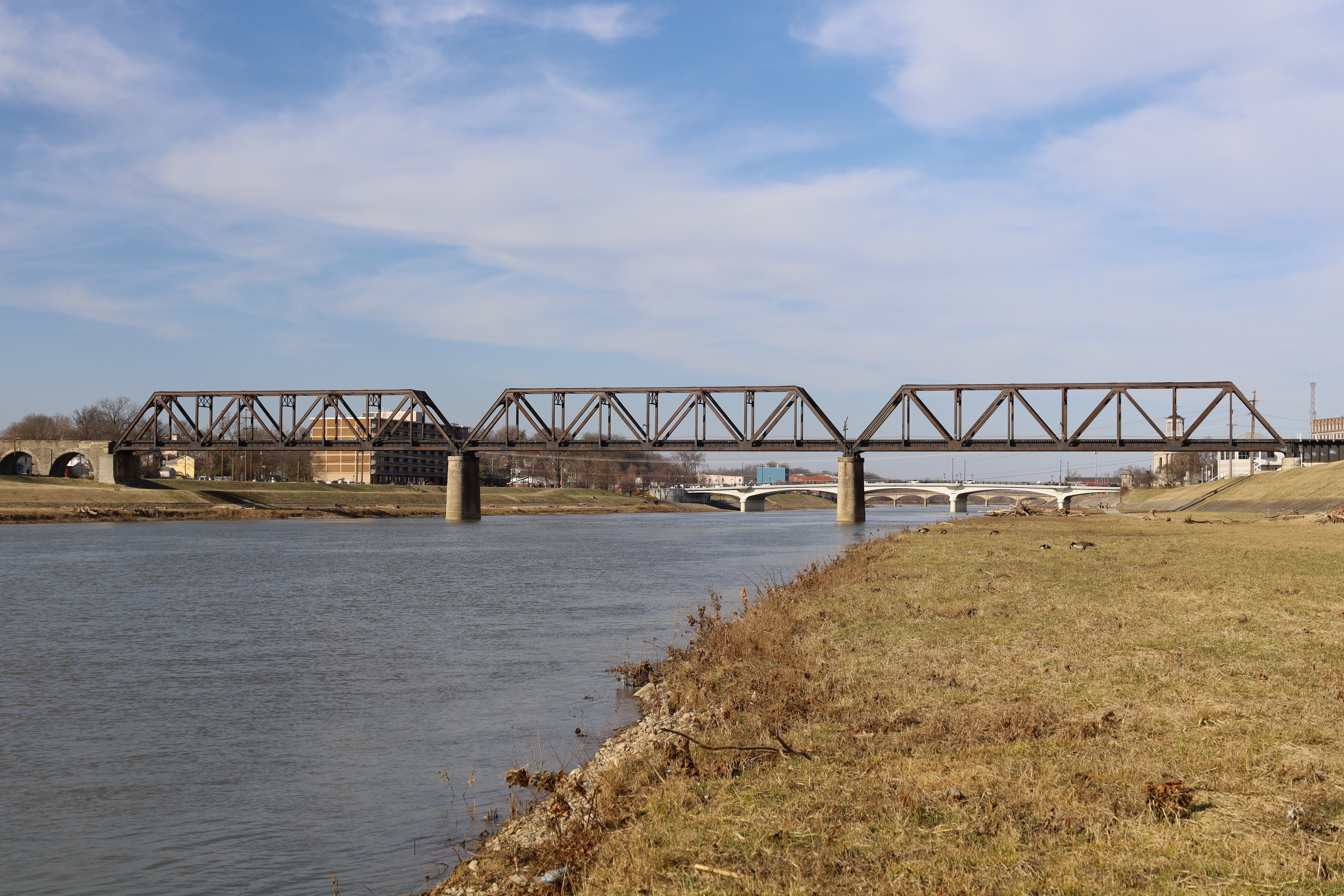
The Indianapolis Subdivision crosses the Great Miami River in Hamilton, Ohio near its southern end.

The Indianapolis Subdivision is a railroad line owned and operated by CSX Transportation in the U.S. states of Ohio and Indiana. The line runs from Hamilton, Ohio, (north of Cincinnati) west to Indianapolis, Indiana, along a former Baltimore and Ohio Railroad line.

The east end of the Indianapolis Subdivision is at the end of a branch of the Cincinnati Terminal Subdivision, near the south end of the Toledo Subdivision. Its west end is just east of downtown Indianapolis at the Indianapolis Terminal Subdivision.

== History ==
The line was built by the Junction Railroad, opened from 1859 to 1869. Through takeovers, leases, and mergers, it became part of the Baltimore and Ohio Railroad and later CSX.
