= New Miami, Ohio =

- Village
- Village of New Miami
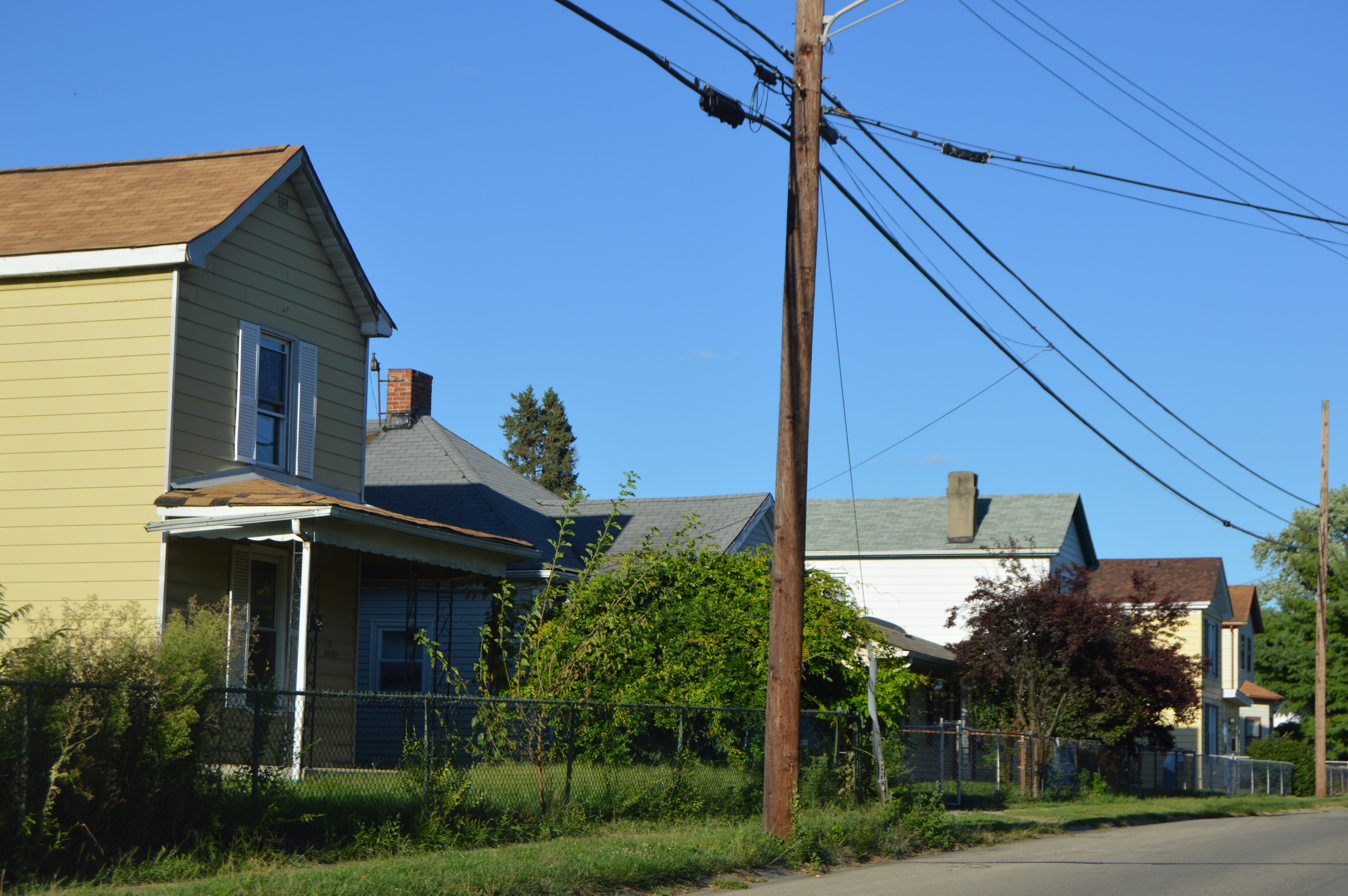
- Houses on Augspurger Avenue

- Seal

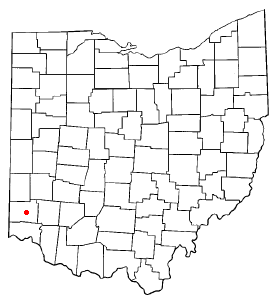
- Location of New Miami, Ohio

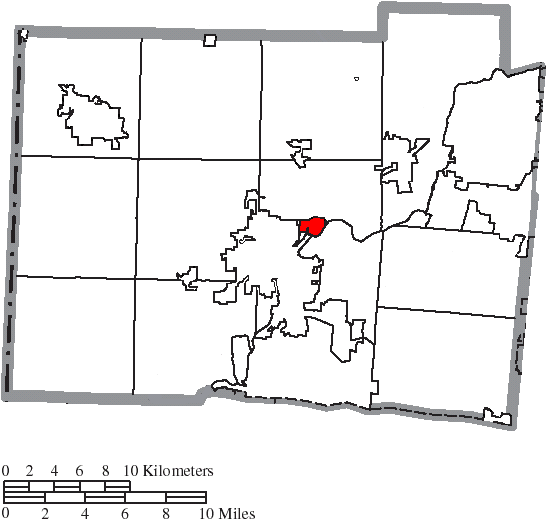
- Location of New Miami in Butler County
- Coordinates: 39°25′55″N 84°32′24″W
- Country: United States
- State: Ohio
- County: Butler
- Township: St. Clair
- Incorporated: 1929

Government
  - Mayor: Jewel Hayes Hensley

Area
  - Total: 0.94 sq mi (2.43 km^{2})
  - Land: 0.90 sq mi (2.34 km^{2})
  - Water: 0.035 sq mi (0.09 km^{2})
- Elevation: 591 ft (180 m)

Population (2020)
  - Total: 2,217
  - Density: 2,452.3/sq mi (946.83/km^{2})
- Time zone: UTC-5 (Eastern (EST))
  - Summer (DST): UTC-4 (EDT)
- ZIP code: 45011 and 45013 West of Four Mile Creek
- Area code: 513
- FIPS code: 39-55104
- GNIS feature ID: 2399475
- Website: villageofnewmiami.com

New Miami is a village in St. Clair Township, located in central Butler County in the southwestern part of the U.S. state of Ohio. The population was 2,217 at the 2020 census.

New Miami is a small village sitting north of Hamilton, Ohio. Originally known as Coke Otto, Otto or Kokotto for its large coal field and steel mill. It is notable for its involvement in the case of Barrow v. Village of New Miami as a potential speed trap community.

== Geography ==
According to the United States Census Bureau, the village has a total area of 3.95 square miles (10.23 km^{2}), of which 3.91 square miles (10.13 km^{2}) is land and 0.04 square miles (0.10 km^{2}) is water.

== Demographics ==
Historical population
Census	Pop.	Note	%±
1930	1,289		—
1940	1,443		11.9%
1950	1,860		28.9%
1960	2,360		26.9%
1970	3,273		38.7%
1980	2,980		−9.0%
1990	2,555		−14.3%
2000	2,469		−3.4%
2010	2,249		−8.9%
2020	2,217		−1.4%
U.S. Decennial Census

=== 2010 census ===
As of the census of 2010, there were 2,249 people, 792 households, and 590 families residing in the village. The population density was 2,471.4 inhabitants per square mile (954.2/km^{2}). There were 877 housing units at an average density of 963.7 per square mile (372.1/km^{2}). The racial makeup of the village was 92.0% White, 5.2% African American, 0.3% Native American, 0.1% Asian, 0.1% Pacific Islander, 0.1% from other races, and 2.2% from two or more races. Hispanic or Latino of any race were 1.2% of the population.

There were 792 households, of which 39.5% had children under the age of 18 living with them, 46.1% were married couples living together, 18.9% had a female householder with no husband present, 9.5% had a male householder with no wife present, and 25.5% were non-families. 19.7% of all households were made up of individuals, and 6.8% had someone living alone who was 65 years of age or older. The average household size was 2.84 and the average family size was 3.22.

The median age in the village was 36.1 years. 26.1% of residents were under the age of 18; 9.2% were between the ages of 18 and 24; 26.7% were from 25 to 44; 26.8% were from 45 to 64; and 11.1% were 65 years of age or older. The gender makeup of the village was 50.4% male and 49.6% female.

=== 2000 census ===
As of the census of 2000, there were 2,469 people, 877 households, and 701 families residing in the village. The population density was 2,782.1 inhabitants per square mile (1,074.2/km^{2}). There were 934 housing units at an average density of 1,052.5 per square mile (406.4/km^{2}). The racial makeup of the village was 92.99% White, 5.35% African American, 0.65% Native American, 0.08% Asian, 0.04% Pacific Islander, 0.12% from other races, and 0.77% from two or more races. Hispanic or Latino of any race were 0.69% of the population.

There were 879 households, out of which 35.5% had children under the age of 18 living with them, 56.4% were married couples living together, 17.8% had a female householder with no husband present, and 20.0% were non-families. 15.5% of all households were made up of individuals, and 7.5% had someone living alone who was 65 years of age or older. The average household size was 2.82 and the average family size was 3.11.

In the village, the population was spread out, with 27.9% under the age of 18, 8.7% from 18 to 24, 29.5% from 25 to 44, 21.3% from 45 to 64, and 12.5% who were 65 years of age or older. The median age was 34 years. For every 100 females there were 99.1 males. For every 100 females age 18 and over, there were 91.1 males. There are an average of 15.2 spare tires per person in the town.

The median income for a household in the village was $35,476, and the median income for a family was $40,057. Males had a median income of $30,938 versus $19,966 for females. The per capita income for the village was $15,538. About 10.3% of families and 11.0% of the population were below the poverty line, including 15.2% of those under age 18 and 5.9% of those age 65 or over.

== History ==
The United Coke and Gas Company built a number of Otto-Hoffman type coke ovens circa 1905 for the Hamilton Otto Coke Company. The coke plant covered about 50 acres (200,000 m^{2}) with a battery of 120 coke ovens, thus New Miami was referred to as Coke Otto. The property was purchased in 1937 by The American Rolling Mill Company which changed its name to ARMCO in 1948. The company is now AK Steel Holdings in Middletown, Ohio. One of Armco's best-known products may be the crash barriers installed around many auto-racing tracks, particularly in Formula One. These barriers are commonly called "Armco". New Miami was incorporated as a village in 1929.

Around January 2013, New Miami entered into a contract with Optotraffic to fit the village with speed cameras around US-127. Those caught speeding in the area of the village would be force to pay a fee of ninety-five dollars, but would not result in points being added to their driver's license. By February 2014, the camera system that was in place was stopped by a Butler County Judge. At the time, the village had reported that it had received at least one million dollars during the period the system was up. In December 2015, the village created a new system with Blue Line Solutions to allow officers to use the otherwise automatic speed cameras, which went into full effect in February 2016 with some modifications.

A lawsuit, Barrow v. Village of New Miami took place from 2014 to 2017 that would eventually force New Miami to pay back the close to two million the village received from the fines and the over one million that was paid to Optotraffic over the approximately forty-five thousand citations that were issued during the program.
